= List of Shooto events =

This is a list of events held and scheduled by Shooto, a Japanese mixed martial arts promotion.

== Past events ==
#	Event title	Date	Arena	Location	Source
697	Lemino Shooto: Pound Out	August 2, 2026	TKP Garden City Chiba 3F Symphonia	Chiba, Japan	
696	Shooto 2026 Vol.5	July 20, 2026	Korakuen Hall	Bunkyo, Tokyo, Japan	
695	Lemino Shooto 7	July 13, 2026	Korakuen Hall	Bunkyo, Tokyo, Japan	
694	Shooto Torao 39	July 12, 2026	Blue Live Hiroshima	Hiroshima, Japan	
693	Lemino Shooto Torao	June 28, 2026	Acros Fukuoka	Fukuoka, Japan	
692	Lemino Shooto 6	June 1, 2026	Korakuen Hall	Bunkyo, Tokyo, Japan	
691	Shooto 2026 Vol.4 in Osaka	May 31, 2026	GORILLA HALL OSAKA	Osaka, Japan	
690	Shooto Force 23	May 24, 2026	Takamatsu Symbol Tower	Takamatsu, Kagawa, Japan	
689	Shooto Torao 38	May 17, 2026	Acros Fukuoka	Fukuoka, Japan	
688	Shooto 2026 Vol.3 (Second part)	May 17, 2026	New Pier Hall	Minato, Tokyo, Japan	
687	Shooto 2026 Vol.3 (First part)	May 17, 2026	New Pier Hall	Minato, Tokyo, Japan	
686	Shooto Border 2026: The 1st	April 26, 2026	Community Plaza Hirano	Osaka, Japan	
685	Lemino Shooto 5	April 19, 2026	Music Town Otoichiba	Okinawa, Japan	
684	Shooto Gig Tokyo Vol.41	April 11, 2026	Shinjuku Face	Shinjuku, Tokyo, Japan	
683	Shooto: Echigo Fujin Matsuri 16 (Second part)	April 5, 2026	Niigata LOTS	Niigata, Japan	
682	Shooto: Echigo Fujin Matsuri 16 (First part)	April 5, 2026	Niigata LOTS	Niigata, Japan	
681	Lemino Shooto 4	March 30, 2026	Korakuen Hall	Bunkyo, Tokyo, Japan	
680	Shooto 2026 Vol.2	March 29, 2026	Korakuen Hall	Bunkyo, Tokyo, Japan	
679	Shooto Gig Tokyo Vol.40	February 28, 2026	Shinjuku Face	Shinjuku, Tokyo, Japan	
678	Lemino Shooto 3	February 18, 2026	Korakuen Hall	Bunkyo, Tokyo, Japan	
677	Shooto 2026 Vol.1	January 18, 2026	New Pier Hall	Minato, Tokyo, Japan	
676	Shooto Colors 6	January 18, 2026	New Pier Hall	Minato, Tokyo, Japan	
675	Shooto Torao 37	December 7, 2025	KDDI Ishin Hall	Yamaguchi, Japan	
674	Shooto 2025 Vol.10 in Osaka	November 22, 2025	GORILLA HALL OSAKA	Osaka, Japan	
673	Shooto 2025 Vol.9	November 16, 2025	Korakuen Hall	Bunkyo, Tokyo, Japan	
672	Shooto Force 22	October 26, 2025	Takamatsu Symbol Tower	Takamatsu, Kagawa, Japan	
671	Lemino Shooto 2	October 19, 2025	Music Town Otoichiba	Okinawa, Japan	
670	Shooto Gig Tokyo Vol.39	October 11, 2025	Shinjuku Face	Shinjuku, Tokyo, Japan	
669	Shooto 2025 Vol.8 (Second part)	September 21, 2025	New Pier Hall	Minato, Tokyo, Japan	
668	Shooto 2025 Vol.7 (First part)	September 21, 2025	New Pier Hall	Minato, Tokyo, Japan	
667	Shooto Border 2025: The 2nd	September 7, 2025	Community Plaza Hirano	Osaka, Japan	
666	Lemino Shooto 1	September 2, 2025	Korakuen Hall	Bunkyo, Tokyo, Japan	
665	Shooto: Echigo Fujin Matsuri 15	August 31, 2025	Niigata LOTS	Niigata, Japan	
664	Shooto 2025 Vol.6	July 21, 2025	Korakuen Hall	Bunkyo, Tokyo, Japan	
663	Shooto Torao 36	July 13, 2025	Blue Live Hiroshima	Hiroshima, Japan	
662	Shooto Force 21	June 22, 2025	Takamatsu Symbol Tower	Takamatsu, Kagawa, Japan	
661	Shooto Colors 5	June 14, 2025	Shinjuku Face	Shinjuku, Tokyo, Japan	
660	Shooto 2025 Vol.5 in Osaka	May 25, 2025	GORILLA HALL OSAKA	Osaka, Japan	
659	Shooto 2025 Vol.4 (Second part)	May 18, 2025	New Pier Hall	Minato, Tokyo, Japan	
658	Shooto 2025 Vol.3 (First part)	May 18, 2025	New Pier Hall	Minato, Tokyo, Japan	
657	Shooto Torao 35	May 11, 2025	Acros Fukuoka	Fukuoka, Japan	
656	Shooto: Echigo Fujin Matsuri 14	April 27, 2025	Niigata LOTS	Niigata, Japan	
655	The Shooto Okinawa Vol.12	April 20, 2025	Music Town Otoichiba	Okinawa, Japan	
654	Shooto Border 2025: The 1st	April 13, 2025	Community Plaza Hirano	Osaka, Japan	
653	Shooto Gig Tokyo Vol.38	March 23, 2025	Shinjuku Face	Shinjuku, Tokyo, Japan	
652	Shooto 2025 Vol.2	March 16, 2025	Korakuen Hall	Bunkyo, Tokyo, Japan	
651	Shooto 2025 Opening Round	January 19, 2025	Korakuen Hall	Bunkyo, Tokyo, Japan	
650	Shooto 2024 Final in Osaka	December 29, 2024	GORILLA HALL OSAKA	Osaka, Japan	
649	Shooto Colors 4	December 15, 2024	Shinjuku Face	Shinjuku, Tokyo, Japan	
648	Shooto 2024 Vol.8	November 30, 2024	Korakuen Hall	Bunkyo, Tokyo, Japan	
647	Shooto Torao 34	November 17, 2024	KDDI Ishin Hall	Yamaguchi, Japan	
646	The Shooto Okinawa Vol.11	November 10, 2024	Music Town Otoichiba	Okinawa, Japan	
645	Shooto Gig Tokyo Vol.37	October 20, 2024	Shinjuku Face	Shinjuku, Tokyo, Japan	
644	Shooto Border 2024: The 1st	September 29, 2024	Community Plaza Hirano	Osaka, Japan	
643	Shooto 2024 Vol.7	September 22, 2024	Korakuen Hall	Bunkyo, Tokyo, Japan	
642	Shooto Force 20	September 8, 2024	Takamatsu Symbol Tower	Takamatsu, Kagawa, Japan	
641	Shooto: Echigo Fujin Matsuri 13	September 1, 2024	Higashi Ward Plaza	Niigata, Japan	
640	Shooto Colors 3	August 3, 2024	Shinjuku Face	Shinjuku, Tokyo, Japan	
639	Shooto 2024 Vol.6 in Osaka (Second part)	July 28, 2024	Abeno Ward Center	Osaka, Japan	
638	Shooto 2024 Vol.6 in Osaka (First part)	July 28, 2024	Abeno Ward Center	Osaka, Japan	
637	Shooto 2024 Vol.5	July 21, 2024	Korakuen Hall	Bunkyo, Tokyo, Japan	
636	Shooto Torao 33	July 14, 2024	Blue Live Hiroshima	Hiroshima, Japan	
635	Shooto Torao 32	May 26, 2024	Acros Fukuoka	Fukuoka, Japan	
634	Shooto × YFU 7 vs. 7 Japan–China Competition	May 19, 2024	New Pier Hall	Minato, Tokyo, Japan	
633	Shooto 2024 Vol.4	May 19, 2024	New Pier Hall	Minato, Tokyo, Japan	
632	Shooto: Echigo Fujin Matsuri 12	April 29, 2024	Niigata LOTS	Niigata, Japan	
631	Shooto Okinawa Vol.10	April 14, 2024	Music Town Otoichiba	Okinawa, Japan	
630	Shooto Gig Tokyo Vol.36	April 7, 2024	Shinjuku Face	Shinjuku, Tokyo, Japan	
629	Shooto Torao Force 19	March 24, 2024	Takamatsu Symbol Tower	Takamatsu, Kagawa, Japan	
628	Shooto 2024 Vol.3	March 23, 2024	Korakuen Hall	Bunkyo, Tokyo, Japan	
627	Shooto Live! Tokyo	March 2, 2024		Tokyo, Japan	
626	Shooto 2024 Vol.2	January 28, 2024	New Pier Hall	Minato, Tokyo, Japan	
625	Shooto 2024 Vol.1	January 28, 2024	New Pier Hall	Minato, Tokyo, Japan	
624	Shooto Torao 31	December 3, 2023	KDDI Ishin Hall	Yamaguchi, Japan	
623	Shooto Mobstyles Presents Fight & Mosh	December 2, 2023	Toyosu PIT	Kōtō, Tokyo, Japan	
622	Shooto Colors 2	December 2, 2023	Toyosu PIT	Kōtō, Tokyo, Japan	
621	Shooto 2023 Vol.7	November 19, 2023	Korakuen Hall	Bunkyo, Tokyo, Japan	
620	Shooto Okinawa Vol.9	November 12, 2023	Music Town Otoichiba	Okinawa, Japan	
619	Shooto Gig Tokyo Vol.35	October 21, 2023	Shinjuku Face	Shinjuku, Tokyo, Japan	
618	Shooto 2023 Vol.6	September 24, 2023	Korakuen Hall	Bunkyo, Tokyo, Japan	
617	Shooto Torao Force 18	September 17, 2023	Takamatsu Symbol Tower	Takamatsu, Kagawa, Japan	
616	Shooto: Echigo Fujin Matsuri 11	September 3, 2023	Bandaijima Tamokuteki Hiroba	Niigata, Japan	
615	Shooto Torao Colors	August 20, 2023	Blue Live Hiroshima	Hiroshima, Japan	
614	Shooto Torao 30	August 20, 2023	Blue Live Hiroshima	Hiroshima, Japan	
613	Shooto 2023 Vol.5	July 23, 2023	Korakuen Hall	Bunkyo, Tokyo, Japan	
612	Shooto 2023 Vol.4	June 17, 2023	Mielparque Hall Osaka	Osaka, Japan	
611	Shooto Torao 29	May 28, 2023	Across Fukuoka	Fukuoka, Yamaguchi, Japan	
610	Shooto 2023 Vol.3	May 21, 2023	New Pier Hall	Minato, Tokyo, Japan	
609	Shooto Colors	May 21, 2023	New Pier Hall	Minato, Tokyo, Japan	
608	Shooto Torao Force 17	April 23, 2023	Takamatsu Symbol Tower	Takamatsu, Kagawa, Japan	
607	Shooto Okinawa Vol.8	April 16, 2023	Music Town Otoichiba	Okinawa, Japan	
606	Shooto Gig Tokyo Vol.34	April 9, 2023	Shinjuku Face	Shinjuku, Tokyo, Japan	
605	Shooto: Echigo Fujin Matsuri 10	March 26, 2023	Bandaijima Tamokuteki Hiroba	Niigata, Japan	
604	Shooto 2023 Vol.2	March 19, 2023	Korakuen Hall	Bunkyo, Tokyo, Japan	
603	Shooto BORDER 2023: The 1st	March 5, 2023	Community Plaza Hirano	Osaka, Japan	
602	Shooto 2023 Opening Round	January 15, 2023	Korakuen Hall	Bunkyo, Tokyo, Japan	
601	Shooto 2022 Vol.8	December 11, 2022	Mielparque Hall Osaka	Osaka, Japan	
600	Shooto Torao 28	December 3, 2022	Shinnanyou Hureai Center	Shunan, Yamaguchi, Japan	
599	Shooto Okinawa Vol.7	November 6, 2022	Music Town Otoichiba	Okinawa, Japan	
598	Shooto Gig Tokyo Vol.33	October 15, 2022	Shinjuku Face	Shinjuku, Tokyo, Japan	
597	Shooto 2022 Vol.6	September 19, 2022	Korakuen Hall	Bunkyo, Tokyo, Japan	
596	Shooto Torao Force 16	September 11, 2022	Takamatsu Symbol Tower	Takamatsu, Kagawa, Japan	
595	Shooto: Echigo Fujin Matsuri 9	August 21, 2022	Bandaijima Tamokuteki Hiroba	Niigata, Japan	
594	Shooto 2022 Vol.5	July 17, 2022	Korakuen Hall	Bunkyo, Tokyo, Japan	
593	Shooto 2022 Vol.4	July 2, 2022	Mielparque Hall Osaka	Osaka, Japan	
592	Shooto 2022 Hokkaido	June 5, 2022	Sapporo ii-one Stadium	Sapporo, Hokkaido, Japan	
591	Shooto 2022 Vol.3	May 22, 2022	Korakuen Hall	Bunkyo, Tokyo, Japan	
590	Shooto Torao 27	May 15, 2022	Yoshimoto Daiwa Securities CONNECT Theater	Fukuoka, Japan	
589	Shooto Torao Force Gig 4	May 15, 2022	Yoshimoto Daiwa Securities CONNECT Theater	Fukuoka, Japan	
588	Shooto Torao Force 15	April 24, 2022	Takamatsu Symbol Tower	Takamatsu, Kagawa, Japan	
587	Shooto Torao Force Gig 2	April 24, 2022	Takamatsu Symbol Tower	Takamatsu, Kagawa, Japan	
586	Shooto Okinawa Vol.6	April 17, 2022	Music Town Otoichiba	Okinawa, Japan	
585	Shooto Gig Tokyo Vol.32	April 3, 2022	Shinjuku Face	Shinjuku, Tokyo, Japan	
584	Shooto 2022 Vol.2	March 21, 2022	Korakuen Hall	Bunkyo, Tokyo, Japan	
583	Shooto 2022 Opening Round	January 16, 2022	Korakuen Hall	Bunkyo, Tokyo, Japan	
582	Shooto 2021 Vol.8	December 18, 2021	Mielparque Hall Osaka	Osaka, Japan	
581	Shooto Torao 26 Hiroshima	December 5, 2021	BLUE LIVE Hiroshima	Hiroshima, Japan	
580	Shooto Torao Gig 03	December 5, 2021	BLUE LIVE Hiroshima	Hiroshima, Japan	
579	The Shooto Okinawa Vol.5	November 14, 2021	Music Town Otoichiba	Okinawa, Japan	
578	Shooto Force 14	November 7, 2021	Takamatsu Symbol Tower	Takamatsu, Japan	
577	Shooto Force Gig 1	November 7, 2021	Takamatsu Symbol Tower	Takamatsu, Japan	
576	Shooto 2021 Vol.7	November 5, 2021	Studio Coast	Tokyo, Japan	
575	Road to ONE: Sexyama Edition	October 5, 2021	Shibuya O-East	Tokyo, Japan	
574	Shooto Gig Tokyo Vol.31	October 2, 2021	Shinjuku Face	Shinjuku, Japan	
573	Shooto 2021 Vol.6	September 20, 2021	Korakuen Hall	Tokyo, Japan	
572	Shooto: Echigo Fujin Matsuri 8	August 27, 2021	Bandaijima Tamokuteki Hiroba	Niigata, Japan	
571	Shooto 2021 Vol.5	July 25, 2021	Korakuen Hall	Tokyo, Japan	
570	Shooto 2021 Vol.4	July 3, 2021	Mielparque Hall Osaka	Osaka, Japan	
569	Shooto Gig Tokyo Vol.30	June 26, 2021	Shinjuku Face	Shinjuku, Japan	
568	Shooto Torao 26	June 13, 2021	Acros Fukuoka	Fukuoka, Japan	
567	Shooto Torao Gig 03	May 16, 2021	Acros Fukuoka	Fukuoka, Japan	
566	The Shooto Okinawa Vol.4	April 18, 2021	Music Town Otoichiba	Okinawa, Japan	
565	Shooto 2021 Vol.2	March 20, 2021	Korakuen Hall	Tokyo, Japan	
564	Road to ONE: Young Guns	February 22, 2021	Shibuya O-East	Tokyo, Japan	
563	Shooto 2021	January 30, 2021	New Pier Hall	Tokyo, Japan	
562	Shooto 2020 Vol.8	December 20, 2020	Mielparque Hall Osaka	Osaka, Japan	
561	Shooto Torao x Force	December 10, 2020	Takamatsu Symbol Tower	Takamatsu, Japan	
560	The Shooto Okinawa Vol.3	November 29, 2020	Music Town Otoichiba	Okinawa, Japan	
559	Shooto 2020 Vol.7	November 23, 2020	Korakuen Hall	Tokyo, Japan	
558	Shooto 2020 Vol.6	September 19, 2020	Shibuya O-East	Tokyo, Japan	
557	Road to ONE 3: Tokyo Fight Night	September 10, 2020	Shibuya O-East	Tokyo, Japan	
556	Shooto 2020 Vol.5	August 1, 2020	Korakuen Hall	Tokyo, Japan	
555	Shooto Vol.4	July 12, 2020	Mielparque Hall OSAKA	Osaka, Japan	
554	Shooto Vol.3	May 31, 2020	Korakuen Hall	Tokyo, Japan	
553	Road to ONE: 2nd	April 17, 2020		Tokyo, Japan	
552	Shooto 2020 vol.2	February 16, 2020	New Pier Hall	Tokyo, Japan	
551	Shooto 2020 1/26: in Korakuen Hall	January 26, 2020	Korakuen Hall	Tokyo, Japan	
550	Shooto BORDER -season 12-: The 1st	January 19, 2020	Community Plaza Hirano	Osaka, Japan	
549	Shooto Gig Tokyo Vol.29	December 22, 2019	Shinjuku FACE	Tokyo, Japan	
548	Shooto FORCE 12	December 15, 2019	Takamatsu Symbol Tower	Takamatsu, Japan	
547	Shooto 30th Anniversary Tour: Final	November 24, 2019	Korakuen Hall	Tokyo, Japan	
546	Shooto Torao 25	November 10, 2019	Blue Live Hiroshima	Hiroshima, Japan	
545	The Shooto Okinawa vol. 2	November 3, 2019	Koza Music Town	Okinawa, Japan	
544	Shooto Gig Tokyo Vol.28	October 20, 2019	Shinjuku FACE	Tokyo, Japan	
543	Shooto 30th Anniversary Tour 7th Round	September 22, 2019	Korakuen Hall	Tokyo, Japan	
542	Shooto BORDER Season 11 The 3rd	September 22, 2019	Community Plaza Hirano	Osaka, Japan	
541	Shooto 30th Anniversary Tour 6th Round	July 15, 2019	Korakuen Hall	Tokyo, Japan	
540	Shooto 30th Anniversary Tour 5th Round: In Osaka	June 30, 2019	Edion Arena	Osaka, Japan	
539	Shooto Torao 24: Direction of the Cage 3	June 16, 2019	Kitakyushushi Kokurakita Gymnastics	Kitakyushu, Japan	
538	Shooto: Gig Tokyo 27	June 8, 2019	Shinjuku FACE	Tokyo, Japan	
537	Shooto BORDER -season11- The 2nd	May 12, 2019	Hirano Community Plaza	Osaka, Japan	
536	Shooto 30th Anniversary Tour at Korakuen Hall	May 6, 2019	Korakuen Hall	Tokyo, Japan	
535	Shooto Force 11	April 7, 2019	Takamatsu Symbol Tower	Takamatsu, Japan	
534	Shooto 30th Anniversary Tour Round 2	March 24, 2019	New Pier Hall	Tokyo, Japan	
533	Shooto 1/27 at Korakuen Hall: 30th Anniversary Tour	January 27, 2019	Korakuen Hall	Tokyo, Japan	
532	Shooto BORDER: Season 11 The 1st	January 19, 2019	Osaka Community Plaza Hirano	Osaka, Japan	
531	Shooto Infinity League 2018 Finals	December 15, 2018	Shinjuku FACE	Tokyo, Japan	
530	THE SHOOTO OKINAWA vol.1	November 25, 2018	Cadena Arena	Okinawa, Japan	
529	Philoktetes Niigata Echigo Festival 6	November 18, 2018	Niigata LOTS	Niigata, Japan	
528	Shooto 11/17: in Korakuen Hall	November 17, 2018	Korakuen Hall	Tokyo, Japan	
527	Shooto: Gig Tokyo 26	October 26, 2018	Shinjuku Face	Tokyo, Japan	
526	Shooto Force 10	October 21, 2018	Takamatsu Symbol Tower	Takamatsu, Japan	
525	Shooto - Border: Season 10 - The 2nd	September 23, 2018	Hirano Ward Community Hall	Osaka, Japan	
524	Shooto in Korakuen Hall	September 23, 2018	Korakuen Hall	Tokyo, Japan	
523	Shooto Torao 23	September 9, 2018	Kitakyushu Performing Arts Center	Kitakyushu, Japan	
522	Shooto: This Is Shooto 2	August 3, 2018	Tsutaya O-East	Tokyo, Japan	
521	Shooto - Professional Shooto 7/15	July 15, 2018	Korakuen Hall	Tokyo, Japan	
520	Shooto Torao 22: Direction of the Cage 2	July 1, 2018	Shunan Community Center	Yamaguchi, Japan	
519	Shooto in Osaka 2018	June 17, 2018	Osaka Prefectural Gymnasium	Osaka, Japan	
518	Shooto 5/13 at Culttz Kawasaki	May 13, 2018	Culttz Kawasaki	Kanagawa, Japan	
517	Shooto: Gig Tokyo 25	April 22, 2018	Shinjuku FACE	Tokyo, Japan	
516	Shooto: Force 9	April 15, 2018	Takamatsu Symbol Tower	Takamatsu, Japan	
515	Shooto Challenge Yamaguchi 05	April 1, 2018	Shunan Community Center	Shunan, Japan	
514	Shooto Korakuen Hall 3/25	March 25, 2018	Korakuen Hall	Tokyo, Japan	
513	Shooto BORDER: Season 10 The 1st	March 24, 2018	Community Plaza Hirano	Osaka, Japan	
512	Echigo Haruichiro Noda 2018	March 10, 2018	Niigata Kameda Gymnasium	Niigata, Japan	
511	Shooto: Gig Tokyo 24	February 24, 2018	Shinjuku FACE	Tokyo, Japan	
510	Shooto - Professional Shooto 1/28	January 28, 2018	Korakuen Hall	Tokyo, Japan	
509	Shooto BORDER: Season 9 The 3rd	December 22, 2017	Community Plaza Hirano	Osaka, Japan	
508	Shooto Infinity League Finals 2017	December 17, 2017	Shinjuku FACE	Tokyo, Japan	
507	Odawara Free Fight 13	December 9, 2017	Shooto Gym Roots	Odawara, Japan	
506	Shooto Force 08	December 3, 2017	Takamatsu Symbol Tower	Takamatsu, Japan	
505	Echigo Fujin Festival 5	November 23, 2017	Philoctetes Niigata	Niigata, Japan	
504	Shooto: Gig Tokyo 23	November 19, 2017	Shinjuku FACE	Tokyo, Japan	
503	Shooto - Shooto Granz 2017	November 12, 2017	Minami Tohoku Sogo Oroshi Center,	Fukushima, Japan	
502	Ryukyu Free Fight Vol. 11	October 21, 2017	Okuyama General Exercise Park	Okinawa, Japan	
501	Professional Shooto 10/15	October 15, 2017	Maihama Amphitheater	Urayasu, Japan	
500	Echigo Hatsukaze Osamu-jin	September 17, 2017	Niigata Kameda Gymnasium	Niigata, Japan	
499	Shooto: Kitakyushu Free Fight	September 16, 2017	Wakamatsu Takeshi Dojo	Kitakyushu, Japan	
498	Shooto Torao 21	September 10, 2017	Kitakyushu Performing Arts Center	Fukuoka, Japan	
497	Shooto BORDER: Season 9 The 2nd	September 3, 2017	Osaka Community Plaza Hirano	Osaka, Japan	
496	Run & Fight & Mosh Vol.1	September 2, 2017	Shinjuku FACE	Tokyo, Japan	
495	Odawara Free Fight 12	August 27, 2017	Odawara	Odawara, Japan	
494	Shooto in Korakuen Hall	July 23, 2017	Korakuen Hall	Hiroshima, Japan	
493	Shooto Torao 20	July 2, 2017	BLUE LIVE Hiroshima	Hiroshima, Japan	
492	Shooto in Osaka	June 25, 2017	Osaka Prefectural Gymnasium	Osaka, Japan	
491	Hong Kong Amateur Shooto Tournament 2017	May 27, 2017	Southorn Indoor Stadium	Hong Kong, China	
490	Ryukyu Free Fight Vol. 10	May 21, 2017	Okuyama General Exercise Park	Okuyama, Japan	
489	Shooto - Professional Shooto 5/12	May 12, 2017	Korakuen Hall	Tokyo, Japan	
488	Sapporo Free Fight Spring 2017	April 30, 2017	North King's Gym	Sapporo, Japan	
487	Shooto - Professional Shooto 4/23	April 23, 2017	Maihama Amphitheater	Urayasu, Japan	
486	Shooto Force 07	April 9, 2017	Takamatsu Symbol Tower	Takamatsu, Japan	
485	Shooto Challenge Yamaguchi 4	April 1, 2017	Mori Dojo	Shunan, Japan	
484	Amateur Shooto: 9th MMA Festival	March 26, 2017	STF Urawa	Saitama, Japan	
483	Shooto - Professional Shooto 3/24	March 24, 2017	Korakuen Hall	Tokyo, Japan	
482	Shooto BORDER: Season 9 The 1st	March 19, 2017	Hirano Community Plaza	Osaka, Japan	
481	Echigo Haruichiban 2017	March 5, 2017	Kameda General Gym	Niigata, Japan	
480	Kumamoto Free Fight 1	March 5, 2017	Kumamoto Kiminori Board	Aso, Japan	
479	Amateur Shooto Chugoku-Shikoku: Force/Attack 08	February 26, 2017	Muscat Stadium	Kurashiki, Japan	
478	Shooto: This Is Shooto	February 24, 2017	Tsutaya O-East	Tokyo, Japan	
477	Amateur Shooto Osaka 8	February 19, 2017	Hitagokoro Board Ikuno Dojo	Osaka, Japan	
476	Shooto - Professional Shooto 1/29	January 29, 2017	Korakuen Hall	Tokyo, Japan	
475	Shooto: Nippon Fight	December 31, 2016	Osanbashi Hall	Yokohama, Japan	
474	Shooto Infinity League 2016 Final	December 18, 2016	Shinjuku FACE	Tokyo, Japan	
473	Shooto BORDER: Season 8 The 3rd	December 10, 2016	Hirano Ward Community Hall	Osaka, Japan	
472	Odawara Free Fight 10	December 3, 2016	Shooto Gym Roots	Odawara, Japan	
471	Ryukyu Free Fight 9	November 27, 2016	Koza Sports Park Okinawa Budokan Judo Hall	Okinawa, Japan	
470	Kitakyushu Free Fight	November 20, 2016	Onga-cho Martial Arts Field	Fukuoka, Japan	
469	Amateur Shooto Osaka 7	November 20, 2016	Hitagokoro Board Ikuno Dojo	Osaka, Japan	
468	Shooto Force 06	November 13, 2016	Takamatsu Symbol Tower	Takamatsu, Japan	
467	Shooto Pacific Rim Double Championship	November 12, 2016	Korakuen Hall	Tokyo, Japan	
466	Shooto Granz 2016	November 6, 2016	Plaza Maryu	Goshogawara, Japan	
465	Shooto: Battle Mix 11	October 29, 2016	Mars Gym	Sapporo, Japan	
464	Shooto: Gig Tokyo 22	October 16, 2016	Shinjuku FACE	Tokyo, Japan	
463	All Japan Amateur Shooto Championship 23	October 9, 2016	Odawara Arena	Odawara, Japan	
462	Shooto: Grapplingman 19	September 4, 2016	Kitakyushu Performing Arts Center	Kitakyushu, Japan	
461	Shooto BORDER: Season 8 The 2nd	September 4, 2016	Hirano Ward Community Hall	Osaka, Japan	
460	Odawara Free Fight 9	August 28, 2016	Shooto Gym Roots	Odawara, Japan	
459	Amateur Shooto Osaka 6	August 7, 2016	Hitagokoro Board Ikuno Dojo Ring	Osaka, Japan	
458	Shooto - Professional Shooto 7/17	July 17, 2016	Korakuen Hall	Tokyo, Japan	
457	Amateur Shooto Hokkaido Championship	July 10, 2016	884 Boxing Gym	Sapporo, Japan	
456	Shooto Gig West Vol. 18	July 3, 2016	Abeno Kumin Center Hall	Osaka, Japan	
455	Shooto Tokai Amateur Championship 5	June 26, 2016	MACS 3 Kobudo Tiger Hall	Tokyo, Japan	
454	Shooto Grapplingman 18	June 12, 2016	Marina Hop Mermaid Space	Hiroshima, Japan	
453	Amateur Shooto Kansai Championship 15	June 4, 2016	Osaka Municipal Central Gym	Osaka, Japan	
452	Shooto: Gig Tokyo 21	May 28, 2016	Shinjuku FACE	Tokyo, Japan	
451	Shooto - Hong Kong Amateur Shooto 2016	May 22, 2016	Southorn Indoor Stadium	Hong Kong, China	
450	Sapporo Free Fight 2016	April 30, 2016	North Kingstown Gym	Sapporo, Japan	
449	Shooto Challenge Yamaguchi 3	April 23, 2016	Shunan Plaza Martial Arts Field	Shunan, Japan	
448	Mobstyles: Fight and Mosh	April 23, 2016	Maihama Amphitheatre	Urayasu, Japan	
448	Shooto Force 05	April 10, 2016	Takamatsu Symbol Tower Exhibition Hall	Takamatsu, Japan	
447	Fight Collection in Okinawa	March 27, 2016	Okinawa Convention Center	Okinawa, Japan	
446	Shooto BORDER: Season 8 The 1st	March 27, 2016	Abeno Kumin Center Hall	Osaka, Japan	
445	Shooto - Professional Shooto 3/21	March 21, 2016	Korakuen Hall	Tokyo, Japan	
444	Amateur Shooto: Setouichi Open 2	March 13, 2016	Takamatsu City Gymnasium	Takamatsu, Japan	
443	Odawara Free Fight 8	March 12, 2016	Shooto Gym Roots	Odawara, Japan	
442	Shooto: Gig Tokyo 20	February 27, 2016	Shinjuku FACE	Tokyo, Japan	
441	Amateur Shooto Osaka 5	February 6, 2016	Hitagokoro Board Ikuno Dojo	Osaka, Japan	
440	Shooto - Professional Shooto 1/11	January 11, 2016	Korakuen Hall	Tokyo, Japan	
439	Shooto BORDER: Season 7 The 3rd	December 22, 2015	Hirano Ward Community Hall	Osaka, Japan	
438	Shooto: Infinity League 2015 Finals	December 20, 2015	Shinjuku FACE	Tokyo, Japan	
437	Odawara Free Fight 7	December 12, 2015	Shooto Gym Roots	Odawara, Japan	
436	Shooto: Force 4	December 6, 2015	Takamatsu Symbol Tower Exhibition Hall	Takamatsu, Japan	
435	Shooto the Comic vol. 1	November 29, 2015	Korakuen Hall	Tokyo, Japan	
434	Shooto: Grapplingman 17	November 15, 2015	Nishitetsu Hall	Fukuoka, Japan	
433	Shooto: Hardball	November 8, 2015	Kobudo Tiger Hall	Nagoya, Japan	
432	Shooto: Fora 4	November 3, 2015	Tachikawa Colosseum	Tachikawa, Japan	
431	Shooto Granz: Cage Fight	November 1, 2015	Kuroishi Central Sports Hall	Kuroishi, Japan	
430	Amateur Shooto Osaka 4	October 24, 2015	Hitagokoro Ikuno Dojo	Osaka, Japan	
429	Ryukyu Free Fight 7	October 3, 2015	Onoyama Sports Park	Naha, Japan	
428	Shooto: Grapplingman 16	September 21, 2015	Shinjuku FACE	Tokyo, Japan	
427	Shooto BORDER: Season 7 The 2nd	September 6, 2015	Plains Community Center	Osaka, Japan	
426	Shooto: Foro 3	August 23, 2015	Gold's Gym	Tokyo, Japan	
425	Shooto - Professional Shooto 7/26	July 26, 2015	Korakuen Hall	Tokyo, Japan	
424	Shooto: Gig West 17	July 12, 2015	Abeno Kumin Center Hall	Osaka, Japan	
423	Shooto - Battle Mix 10	June 28, 2015	Sapporo Hotel and Spa Resort	Sapporo, Japan	
422	Shooto: Grapplingman 15	June 21, 2015	Hiroshima City Exhibition Hall	Hiroshima, Japan	
421	Mobstyles 15th Anniversary: Fight & Mosh	May 3, 2015	Korakuen Hall	Tokyo, Japan	
420	Amateur Shooto Osaka 3	April 18, 2015	Hitagokoro Ikuno Dojo	Osaka, Japan	
419	Shooto: Gig Tokyo 19	April 18, 2015	Shinjuku FACE	Tokyo, Japan	
418	Shooto: Force 3	April 12, 2015	Takamatsu Symbol Tower Exhibition Hall	Takamatsu, Japan	
417	Shooto BORDER: Season 7 The 1st	March 22, 2015	Hirano Ward Community Hall	Osaka, Japan	
416	Shooto: Gig Tokyo 18	February 11, 2015	Shinjuku FACE	Tokyo, Japan	
415	Shooto: Season Opener	January 25, 2015	Korakuen Hall	Tokyo, Japan	
414	Shooto - Rookie Tournament Final 2014	December 21, 2014	Shinjuku Face	Tokyo, Japan	
413	Shooto - Torao 14	November 9, 2014	Nishitetsu Hall	Kitakyushu, Fukuoka, Japan	
412	Shooto - Granz 2014	October 26, 2014	Aomori Prefectural Budokan	Hirosaki, Aomori, Japan	
411	Shooto - 21st All-Japan Amateur Shooto Championships	October 12, 2014	Odawara Arena	Odawara, Kanagawa, Japan	
410	Shooto - Battle Mix 9	October 5, 2014	Mars Gym	Sapporo, Hokkaido, Japan	
409	Shooto - 7th Round 2014	September 27, 2014	Korakuen Hall	Tokyo, Japan	
408	Shooto - Border: Season 6 - The 3rd	September 21, 2014	Hirano Ward Community Hall	Osaka, Kansai, Japan	
407	Shooto: 8th Tohoku Amateur Shooto Championships	July 27, 2014	DNA Gym	Fukushima, Japan	
406	Shooto: 7th Shikoku Amateur Shooto Championships	July 20, 2014	Takamatsu City Gymnasium	Takamatsu, Kagawa, Japan	
405	Shooto: Gig Tokyo 17	July 19, 2014	Shinjuku Face	Tokyo, Japan	
404	Shooto: Gig West 16	July 6, 2014	Abeno-kumin Center Hall	Osaka, Kansai, Japan	
403	Shooto: 13th Kanto Amateur Shooto Championships	July 6, 2014	Taito Riverside Sports Center	Tokyo, Japan	
402	Shooto: 8th Hokkaido Amateur Shooto Championships	July 6, 2014	Mars Gym	Sapporo, Hokkaido, Japan	
401	Shooto: 7th Chugoku Amateur Shooto Championships	June 22, 2014	Muscat Stadium	Kurashiki, Okayama, Japan	
400	4th Tokai Amateur Shooto Championships	June 22, 2014		Nagoya, Aichi, Japan	
399	Shooto: 4th Hokushinetsu Amateur Shooto Championships	June 15, 2014		Niigata, Niigata, Japan	
398	Shooto: 8th Kyushu Amateur Shooto Championships	June 8, 2014		Kitakyushu, Fukuoka, Japan	
397	Shooto: 14th Kansai Amateur Shooto Championships	June 1, 2014	Osaka Municipal Central Gymnasium Judo Hall	Osaka, Kansai, Japan	
396	Shooto: Torao 13th	May 25, 2014	Marina Hop Mermaid Space	Hiroshima, Japan	
395	Shooto: 4th Round 2014	May 5, 2014	Korakuen Hall	Tokyo, Japan	
394	Shooto: Border: Season 6: The 2nd	April 27, 2014	Hirano Ward Community Hall	Osaka, Kansai, Japan	
393	Shooto: Gig Tokyo 16	April 20, 2014	Shinjuku Face	Tokyo, Japan	
392	Shooto: 2nd Round 2014	March 16, 2014	Korakuen Hall	Tokyo, Japan	
391	Shooto / Torao Nation States: Force 02	March 9, 2014	Takamatsu Symbol Tower Exhibition Hall	Takamatsu, Kagawa, Japan	
390	Amateur Shooto: Shikoku Free Fight	March 2, 2014	Botchan Stadium Sports Floor 1	Matsuyama, Ehime, Japan	
389	Shooto: Shooting Disco Final	February 22, 2014	Shinjuku Face	Tokyo, Japan	
388	Shooto / Torao Nation States: Force/Attack 02	January 26, 2014	Ibara Gymnasium	Ibara, Okayama, Japan	
387	Shooto: 1st Round 2014	January 13, 2014	Korakuen Hall	Tokyo, Japan	
386	Shooto: Border: Season 6: The 1st	January 12, 2014	Hirano Ward Community Hall	Osaka, Kansai, Japan	
385	Shooto: The Rookie Tournament Final 2013	December 15, 2013	Shinjuku Face	Tokyo, Japan	
384	Shooto: Odawara Free Fight 2	December 8, 2013	Shooto Gym Roots	Odawara, Kanagawa, Japan	
383	Shooto: 20th All-Japan Amateur Shooto Championships	November 23, 2013	Odawara Arena	Odawara, Kanagawa, Japan	
382	Shooto: 5th Round 2013	November 9, 2013	Korakuen Hall	Tokyo, Japan	
381	Shooto: Battle Mix 8	October 6, 2013	Mars Gym	Sapporo, Hokkaido, Japan	
380	Shooto: Shooting Disco 22	October 5, 2013	Shinjuku Face	Tokyo, Japan	
379	Shooto: 4th Round 2013	September 29, 2013	Korakuen Hall	Tokyo, Japan	
378	Shooto: Granz	September 22, 2013	Aomori Prefectural Budokan	Hirosaki, Aomori, Japan	
377	Shooto: Border: Season 5: Second	September 1, 2013	Hirano Ward Community Hall	Osaka, Kansai, Japan	
376	Shooto: Gig Tokyo 15	August 25, 2013	Shinjuku Face	Tokyo, Japan	
375	Shooto: Gig West 15	July 28, 2013	Abeno-kumin Center Hall	Osaka, Kansai, Japan	
374	Shooto: 3rd Round 2013	July 27, 2013	Korakuen Hall	Tokyo, Japan	
373	Shooto: Shooting Disco 21: Catch the Moment	June 8, 2013	Shinjuku Face	Tokyo, Japan	
372	Shooto: Grapplingman 12	June 2, 2013	Hiroshima Industrial Hall	Hiroshima, Japan	
371	Shooto: Foro 1	May 12, 2013	Gold's Gym South Tokyo Annex	Tokyo, Japan	
370	Shooto: Gig Tokyo 14	April 21, 2013	Shinjuku Face	Tokyo, Japan	
369	Shooto: Isami Shooto Caravan Fukushima	April 14, 2013	DNA Gym	Fukushima, Japan	
368	Shooto: Yamaguchi Free Fight 2	April 14, 2013	Hofu Budokan	Hofu, Yamaguchi, Japan	
367	Shooto: Border: Season 5: First	April 7, 2013	Hirano Ward Community Hall	Osaka, Kansai, Japan	
366	Shooto: Yokohama Free Fight 1	March 31, 2013	P\'s Lab Yokohama	Yokohama, Kanagawa, Japan	
365	Shooto: Isami Shooto Caravan Nagoya	March 24, 2013	Kobudo Martial Arts Communication Space Tiger Hall	Nagoya, Aichi, Japan	
364	Shooto / Torao Nation States: Force 01	March 24, 2013	Takamatsu Symbol Tower Exhibition Hall	Takamatsu, Kagawa, Japan	
363	Shooto: 2nd Round 2013	March 16, 2013	Korakuen Hall	Tokyo, Japan	
362	Shooto: Isami Shooto Caravan Tokyo	March 10, 2013	Krazy Bee Gym	Tokyo, Japan	
361	Shooto: Shooting Disco 20	February 23, 2013	Shinjuku Face	Tokyo, Japan	
360	Shooto: Gig Tokyo 13	February 16, 2013	Shinjuku Face	Tokyo, Japan	
359	Shooto: 1st Round 2013	January 20, 2013	Korakuen Hall	Tokyo, Japan	
358	Shooto: The Rookie Tournament Final 2012	December 15, 2012	Shinjuku Face	Tokyo, Japan	
357	Shooto: Border: Season 4: Third	December 9, 2012	Hirano Ward Community Hall	Osaka, Kansai, Japan	
356	Shooto: 12th Round	November 11, 2012	Korakuen Hall	Tokyo, Japan	
355	Shooto: Gig Tokyo 12	October 27, 2012	Shinjuku Face	Tokyo, Japan	
354	Shooto: Shooting Disco 19: Reborn	October 7, 2012	Shinjuku Face	Tokyo, Japan	
353	Shooto: 10th Round	September 30, 2012	Korakuen Hall	Tokyo, Japan	
352	Shooto: Border: Season 4: Second	September 23, 2012	Hirano Ward Community Hall	Osaka, Kansai, Japan	
351	Shooto: Gig North 8	September 16, 2012	Zepp Sapporo	Sapporo, Hokkaido, Japan	
350	Shooto: Gig Tokyo 11	August 25, 2012	Shinjuku Face	Tokyo, Japan	
349	Shooto: 8th Round	July 16, 2012	Korakuen Hall	Tokyo, Japan	
348	Shooto: Gig West 14	July 8, 2012	Abeno-kumin Center Hall	Osaka, Kansai, Japan	
347	Shooto: Gig Tokyo 10	June 30, 2012	Shinjuku Face	Tokyo, Japan	
346	Shooto: Shooting Disco 18	June 2, 2012	Shinjuku Face	Tokyo, Japan	
345	Shooto: 5th Round	May 18, 2012	Korakuen Hall	Tokyo, Japan	
344	Shooto: Battle Mix 7	April 22, 2012	Sapporo Concarino	Sapporo, Hokkaido, Japan	
343	Shooto: Gig Tokyo 9	April 14, 2012	Shinjuku Face	Tokyo, Japan	
342	Shooto: Border: Season 4: First	April 1, 2012	Hirano Ward Community Hall	Osaka, Kansai, Japan	
341	Shooto: 3rd Round	March 10, 2012	Korakuen Hall	Tokyo, Japan	
340	Shooto: Shooting Disco 17	February 25, 2012	Shinjuku Face	Tokyo, Japan	
339	Shooto: Gig Central 24: Love and Courage	February 12, 2012	Asunal Kanayama Hall	Nagoya, Aichi, Japan	
338	Shooto: Gig Kagawa 1	February 5, 2012	Takamatsu Symbol Tower Exhibition Hall	Takamatsu, Kagawa, Japan	
337	Shooto: Gig Tokyo 8	January 21, 2012	Shinjuku Face	Tokyo, Japan	
336	Shooto: Survivor Tournament Final	January 8, 2012	Korakuen Hall	Tokyo, Japan	
335	Shooto: The Rookie Tournament 2011 Final	December 18, 2011	Shinjuku Face	Tokyo, Japan	
334	Shooto: Spirit Aomori	November 27, 2011	Aomori Prefectural Budokan	Hirosaki, Aomori, Japan	
333	Shoot Boxing / Rise / Sustain: SRS 2011 for Japan	November 11, 2011	Korakuen Hall	Tokyo, Japan	
332	Shooto: Shooto the Shoot 2011	November 5, 2011	Tokyo Dome City Hall	Tokyo, Japan	
331	Shooto: Gig North 7	October 16, 2011	Zepp Sapporo	Sapporo, Hokkaido, Japan	
330	Shooto: Gig Central 23	October 2, 2011	Asunal Kanayama Hall	Nagoya, Aichi, Japan	
329	Shooto: Shooting Disco 16: Regeneration	October 1, 2011	Shinjuku Face	Tokyo, Japan	
328	Shooto: Shootor's Legacy 4	September 23, 2011	Korakuen Hall	Tokyo, Japan	
327	Shooto: Border: Season 3: Roaring Thunder	September 4, 2011	Hirano Ward Community Hall	Osaka, Kansai, Japan	
326	Shooto: Gig Tokyo 7	August 6, 2011	Shinjuku Face	Tokyo, Japan	
325	Shooto: Shootor's Legacy 3	July 18, 2011	Korakuen Hall	Tokyo, Japan	
324	Shooto: Shooting Disco 15: Try Hard, Japan!	June 11, 2011	Shinjuku Face	Tokyo, Japan	
323	Shooto: Gig West 13	June 5, 2011	Abeno Ward Hall	Osaka, Kansai, Japan	
322	Shooto: Gig Tokyo 6	May 28, 2011	Shinjuku Face	Tokyo, Japan	
321	Shooto: Shooto Tradition 2011	April 29, 2011	Tokyo Dome City Hall	Tokyo, Japan	
320	Shooto: Gig Central 22	April 17, 2011	Asunal Kanayama Hall	Nagoya, Aichi, Japan	
319	Shooto: Gig Saitama 3	April 10, 2011	Fujimi Cultural Center	Fujimi, Saitama, Japan	
318	Shooto: Border: Season 3: Spring Thunder	April 3, 2011	Hirano Ward Community Hall	Osaka, Kansai, Japan	
317	Shooto: Shootor's Legacy 2	April 1, 2011	Shinjuku Face	Tokyo, Japan	
316	Shooto: Genesis	March 21, 2011	Kokurakita Gym	Kitakyushu, Fukuoka, Japan	
315	Shooto: Shooting Disco 14: 365-Step March	February 26, 2011	Shinjuku Face	Tokyo, Japan	
314	Shooto: Shootor's Legacy 1	January 10, 2011	Korakuen Hall	Tokyo, Japan	
313	Shooto: Border: Season 2: Immovable	December 26, 2010	Hirano Ward Community Hall	Osaka, Kansai, Japan	
312	Shooto: The Rookie Tournament 2010 Final	December 18, 2010	Shinjuku Face	Tokyo, Japan	
311	Shooto: The Way of Shooto 6: Like a Tiger, Like a Dragon	November 19, 2010	Korakuen Hall	Tokyo, Japan	
310	Shooto: Gig Central 21	October 24, 2010	Asunal Kanayama Hall	Nagoya, Aichi, Japan	
309	Shooto: Shooting Disco 13: Can't Stop Myself!	October 16, 2010	Shinjuku Face	Tokyo, Japan	
308	Shooto: Gig West 12	September 26, 2010	Abeno Ward Hall	Osaka, Kansai, Japan	
307	Shooto: The Way of Shooto 5: Like a Tiger, Like a Dragon	September 23, 2010	Korakuen Hall	Tokyo, Japan	
306	Shooto: Kitazawa Shooto Vol. 4	September 17, 2010	Kitazawa Town Hall	Tokyo, Japan	
305	Shooto: Gig North 6	August 29, 2010	Zepp Sapporo	Sapporo, Hokkaido, Japan	
304	Shooto: Border: Season 2: Rhythm	August 15, 2010	Hirano Ward Community Hall	Osaka, Kansai, Japan	
303	Shooto: Gig Tokyo 5	August 7, 2010	Shinjuku Face	Tokyo, Japan	
302	Shooto: The Way of Shooto 4: Like a Tiger, Like a Dragon	July 19, 2010	Korakuen Hall	Tokyo, Japan	
301	Shooto: Gig Saitama 2	July 4, 2010	Pal City Civic Hall	Shiki, Saitama, Japan	
300	Shooto: Spirit 2010 Summer	June 27, 2010	Accel Hall	Sendai, Miyagi, Japan	
299	Shooto: Gig Central 20	June 13, 2010	Zepp Nagoya	Nagoya, Aichi, Japan	
298	Shooto: Shooting Disco 12: Stand By Me	June 6, 2010	Shinjuku Face	Tokyo, Japan	
297	Shooto: The Way of Shooto 3: Like a Tiger, Like a Dragon	May 30, 2010	Tokyo Dome City Hall	Tokyo, Japan	
296	Shooto: Grapplingman 11	May 16, 2010	Hiroshima Industrial Hall	Hiroshima, Japan	
295	Shooto: Kitazawa Shooto Vol. 3	May 9, 2010	Kitazawa Town Hall	Tokyo, Japan	
294	Shooto: Gig Tokyo 4	April 24, 2010	Shinjuku Face	Tokyo, Japan	
293	Shooto: Grapplingman 10	April 4, 2010	Mamakari Forum	Okayama, Japan	
292	Shooto: Border: Season 2: Vibration	March 28, 2010	Hirano Ward Community Hall	Osaka, Kansai, Japan	
291	Shooto: The Way of Shooto 2: Like a Tiger, Like a Dragon	March 22, 2010	Korakuen Hall	Tokyo, Japan	
290	Shooto: Spirit 2010 Spring	March 7, 2010	Accel Hall	Sendai, Miyagi, Japan	
289	Shooto: Shooting Disco 11: Tora Tora Tora!	February 27, 2010	Shinjuku Face	Tokyo, Japan	
288	Shooto: Trilogy 1	February 21, 2010	Southernpia Hakata	Hakata-ku, Fukuoka	
287	Shooto: Gig North 5	February 14, 2010	Zepp Sapporo	Sapporo, Hokkaido, Japan	
286	Shooto: The Way of Shooto 1: Like a Tiger, Like a Dragon	January 23, 2010	Korakuen Hall	Tokyo, Japan	
285	Shooto: Alternative 1	December 23, 2009	Sumiyoshi Community Center Hall	Osaka, Kansai, Japan	
284	Shooto: The Rookie Tournament 2009 Final	December 13, 2009	Shinjuku Face	Tokyo, Japan	
283	Shooto: Grapplingman 9	November 29, 2009	Kitajima North Park General Fitness Center	Kitajima, Tokushima, Japan	
282	Shooto: Revolutionary Exchanges 3	November 23, 2009	Tokyo Dome City Hall	Tokyo, Japan	
281	Shooto: Gig Central 19	October 25, 2009	Asunal Kanayama Hall	Nagoya, Aichi, Japan	
280	Shooto: Gig Tokyo 3	October 18, 2009	Shinjuku Face	Tokyo, Japan	
279	Shooto: Border: Season 1: Clash	October 4, 2009	Hirano Ward Community Hall	Osaka, Kansai, Japan	
278	Shooto: Revolutionary Exchanges 2	September 22, 2009	Korakuen Hall	Tokyo, Japan	
277	Shooto: Shooting Disco 10: Twist and Shooto	September 20, 2009	Shinjuku Face	Tokyo, Japan	
276	Shooto: Kitazawa Shooto 2009 Vol. 2	September 4, 2009	Kitazawa Town Hall	Tokyo, Japan	
275	Shooto: Gig Central 18	August 30, 2009	Asunal Kanayama Hall	Nagoya, Aichi, Japan	
274	Shooto: Border: Season 1: Advance	August 16, 2009	Hirano Ward Community Hall	Osaka, Kansai, Japan	
273	Shooto: Gig Saitama 1	August 9, 2009	Fujimi Culture Hall	Fujimi, Saitama, Japan	
272	Shooto: Revolutionary Exchanges 1: Undefeated	July 19, 2009	Korakuen Hall	Tokyo, Japan	
271	Shooto: Gig North 4	June 7, 2009	Zepp Sapporo	Sapporo, Hokkaido, Japan	
270	Shooto: Shooting Disco 9: Superman	June 6, 2009	Shinjuku Face	Tokyo, Japan	
269	Shooto: Spirit 2009	May 24, 2009	Accel Hall	Sendai, Miyagi, Japan	
268	Shooto: Kitazawa Shooto 2009 Vol. 1	May 20, 2009	Kitazawa Town Hall	Tokyo, Japan	
267	Shooto: Grapplingman 8	May 17, 2009	Hiroshima Industrial Hall	Hiroshima, Japan	
266	Shooto: Shooto Tradition Final	May 10, 2009	Tokyo Dome City Hall	Tokyo, Japan	
265	Shooto: Gig West 11	April 29, 2009	Azalea Taisho Hall	Osaka, Kansai, Japan	
264	Shooto: Gig Tokyo 2	April 19, 2009	Shinjuku Face	Tokyo, Japan	
263	Shooto: Gig Central 17	April 12, 2009	Asunal Kanayama Hall	Nagoya, Aichi, Japan	
262	Shooto: Shooting Disco 8: We Are Tarzan!	April 10, 2009	Shinjuku Face	Tokyo, Japan	
261	Shooto: Gig Torao 2	March 22, 2009	Fukuyama Industrial Exchange Center	Fukuyama, Hiroshima, Japan	
260	Shooto: Shooto Tradition 6	March 20, 2009	Korakuen Hall	Tokyo, Japan	
259	Shooto: Border: Season 1: Outbreak	March 8, 2009	Hirano Ward Community Hall	Osaka, Kansai, Japan	
258	Shooto: Gig Tokyo 1	February 28, 2009	Shinjuku Face	Tokyo, Japan	
257	Shooto: Shooting Disco 7: Young Man	January 31, 2009	Shinjuku Face	Tokyo, Japan	
256	Shooto: Shooto Tradition 5	January 18, 2009	Differ Ariake Arena	Tokyo, Japan	
255	Shooto: The Rookie Tournament 2008 Final	December 13, 2008	Shinjuku Face	Tokyo, Japan	
254	Shooto: Shooto Tradition 4	November 29, 2008	Korakuen Hall	Tokyo, Japan	
253	Shooto: Gig North 3	November 22, 2008	Zepp Sapporo	Sapporo, Hokkaido, Japan	
252	Shooto: Gig Central 16	October 26, 2008	Tokai TV Telepia Hall	Nagoya, Aichi, Japan	
251	Shooto: 10/13 in Kitazawa Town Hall	October 13, 2008		Kitazawa, Japan	
250	Shooto: Shooting Disco 6: Glory Shines In You	October 5, 2008	Shinjuku Face	Tokyo, Japan	
249	Shooto: Shooto Tradition 3	September 28, 2008	Korakuen Hall	Tokyo, Japan	
248	Shooto: Gig West 10	September 20, 2008	Azalea Taisho Hall	Osaka, Kansai, Japan	
247	Shooto: Gig Central 15	August 3, 2008	Zepp Nagoya	Nagoya, Aichi, Japan	
246	Shooto: Shooto Tradition 2	July 18, 2008	Korakuen Hall	Tokyo, Japan	
245	Shooto: 6/26 in Kitazawa Town Hall	June 26, 2008	Kitazawa Town Hall	Tokyo, Japan	
244	Shooto: Shooting Disco 5: Earth, Wind and Fighter	June 21, 2008	Shinjuku Face	Tokyo, Japan	
243	Shooto: Gig North 2	May 25, 2008	Zepp Sapporo	Sapporo, Hokkaido, Japan	
242	Shooto: Grapplingman 7	May 18, 2008	Hiroshima Industrial Hall	Hiroshima, Japan	
241	Shooto: Shooto Tradition 1	May 3, 2008	Tokyo Dome City Hall	Tokyo, Japan	
240	Shooto: Back To Our Roots 8	March 28, 2008	Korakuen Hall	Tokyo, Japan	
239	Shooto: Gig Torao 1	March 23, 2008	Fukuyama Industrial Exchange Center	Fukuyama, Hiroshima, Japan	
238	Shooto: 3/21 in Kitazawa Town Hall	March 21, 2008	Kitazawa Town Hall	Tokyo, Japan	
237	Shooto: Gig Central 14	March 16, 2008	Tokai TV Telepia Hall	Nagoya, Aichi, Japan	
236	Shooto: Gig West 9	March 15, 2008	Azalea Taisho Hall	Osaka, Kansai, Japan	
235	Shooto: Shooting Disco 4: Born in the Fighting	February 23, 2008	Shinjuku Face	Tokyo, Japan	
234	Shooto: Back To Our Roots 7	January 26, 2008	Korakuen Hall	Tokyo, Japan	
233	Shooto: Rookie Tournament 2007 Final	December 8, 2007	Shinjuku Face	Tokyo, Japan	
232	Shooto: Back To Our Roots 6	November 8, 2007	Korakuen Hall	Tokyo, Japan	
231	Shooto: Shooting Disco 3: Everybody Fight Now	October 20, 2007	Shinjuku Face	Tokyo, Japan	
230	Shooto: Gig Central 13	October 8, 2007	Nagoya International Conference Hall	Nagoya, Aichi, Japan	
229	Shooto: Gig West 8	September 29, 2007	Azalea Taisho Hall	Osaka, Kansai, Japan	
228	Shooto: Back To Our Roots 5	September 22, 2007	Korakuen Hall	Tokyo, Japan	
227	Shooto: Gig North 1	September 2, 2007	Zepp Sapporo	Sapporo, Hokkaido, Japan	
226	Shooto: Shooting Disco 2: The Heat Rises Tonight	August 5, 2007	Shinjuku Face	Tokyo, Japan	
225	Shooto: Battle Mix Tokyo 4	July 20, 2007	Tokyo Kinema Club	Tokyo, Japan	
224	Shooto: Back To Our Roots 4	July 15, 2007	Korakuen Hall	Tokyo, Japan	
223	Shooto 2007: 6/30 in Kitazawa Town Hall	June 30, 2007	Kitazawa Town Hall	Tokyo, Japan	
222	Shooto: Shooting Disco 1: Saturday Night Hero	June 2, 2007	Shinjuku Face	Tokyo, Japan	
221	Shooto: Battle Mix Tokyo 3	May 26, 2007	Tokyo Kinema Club	Tokyo, Japan	
220	Shooto: Back To Our Roots 3	May 18, 2007	Korakuen Hall	Tokyo, Japan	
219	Shooto: Grapplingman 6	May 13, 2007	Hiroshima Industrial Hall	Hiroshima, Japan	
218	Shooto: Gig West 7	April 21, 2007	Azalea Taisho Hall	Osaka, Kansai, Japan	
217	Shooto: Battle Mix Tokyo 2	March 30, 2007	Tokyo Kinema Club	Tokyo, Japan	
216	Shooto: Gig Central 12	March 25, 2007	Zepp Nagoya	Nagoya, Aichi, Japan	
215	Shooto: Back To Our Roots 2	March 16, 2007	Korakuen Hall	Tokyo, Japan	
214	Shooto: It's Strong Being a Man	March 4, 2007	Kitazawa Town Hall	Tokyo, Japan	
213	Shooto: Back To Our Roots 1	February 17, 2007	Pacifico Yokohama	Yokohama, Kanagawa, Japan	
212	Shooto: Battle Mix Tokyo 1	January 26, 2007	Tokyo Kinema Club	Tokyo, Japan	
211	Shooto: Rookie Tournament Final	December 2, 2006	Shinjuku Face	Tokyo, Japan	
210	Shooto: 11/30 in Kitazawa Town Hall	November 30, 2006	Kitazawa Town Hall	Tokyo, Japan	
209	Shooto: Gig Central 11	November 26, 2006	Zepp Nagoya	Nagoya, Aichi, Japan	
208	G-Shooto: G-Shooto Special03	November 19, 2006	Shin-Kiba 1st Ring	Tokyo, Japan	
207	Shooto: 11/10 in Korakuen Hall	November 10, 2006	Korakuen Hall	Tokyo, Japan	
206	Shooto: Gig West 6	November 4, 2006	Azalea Taisho Hall	Osaka, Kansai, Japan	
205	G-Shooto: Special 02	October 20, 2006	Tokyo Kinema Club	Tokyo, Japan	
204	Shooto: Champion Carnival	October 14, 2006	Pacifico Yokohama	Yokohama, Kanagawa, Japan	
203	Shooto 2006: 10/1 in Kitazawa Town Hall	October 1, 2006	Kitazawa Town Hall	Tokyo, Japan	
202	Shooto: Gig Central 10	September 17, 2006	Zepp Nagoya	Nagoya, Aichi, Japan	
201	Shooto 2006: 9/8 in Korakuen Hall	September 8, 2006	Korakuen Hall	Tokyo, Japan	
200	G-Shooto: Wrestle Expo 2006	August 19, 2006	Tokyo Waterfront Center	Tokyo, Japan	
199	Shooto: Shooting Star	July 30, 2006	Kitazawa Town Hall	Tokyo, Japan	
198	Shooto 2006: 7/21 in Korakuen Hall	July 21, 2006	Korakuen Hall	Tokyo, Japan	
197	G-Shooto: G-Shooto 06	June 11, 2006	Kitazawa Town Hall	Tokyo, Japan	
196	Shooto: Gig West 5	June 3, 2006	Azalea Taisho Hall	Osaka, Kansai, Japan	
195	Shooto 2006: 5/28 in Kitazawa Town Hall	May 28, 2006	Kitazawa Town Hall	Tokyo, Japan	
194	Shooto: Grapplingman 5	May 14, 2006		Hiroshima, Japan	
193	Shooto: The Devilock	May 12, 2006	Korakuen Hall	Tokyo, Japan	
192	G-Shooto: G-Shooto 05	May 6, 2006	Shinjuku Face	Tokyo, Japan	
191	Shooto: 3/24 in Korakuen Hall	March 24, 2006	Korakuen Hall	Tokyo, Japan	
190	G-Shooto: G-Shooto 04	March 11, 2006	Shinjuku Face	Tokyo, Japan	
189	Shooto: 3/3 in Kitazawa Town Hall	March 3, 2006	Kitazawa Town Hall	Tokyo, Japan	
188	Shooto: Gig Central 9	February 26, 2006	Zepp Nagoya	Nagoya, Aichi, Japan	
187	G-Shooto: Plus05	February 24, 2006	Shin-Kiba 1st Ring	Tokyo, Japan	
186	Shooto: The Victory of the Truth	February 17, 2006	Yoyogi National Gymnasium	Tokyo, Japan	
185	G-Shooto: G-Shooto 03	December 17, 2005	Shinjuku Face	Tokyo, Japan	
184	Shooto: 12/17 in Shinjuku Face	December 17, 2005	Shinjuku Face	Tokyo, Japan	
183	Shooto 2005: 11/29 in Kitazawa Town Hall	November 29, 2005	Kitazawa Town Hall	Tokyo, Japan	
182	Shooto: Shooto & Kakumei Kickboxing	November 13, 2005	Osaka Prefectural Gymnasium	Osaka, Kansai, Japan	
181	G-Shooto: Plus04	November 11, 2005	Shin-Kiba 1st Ring	Tokyo, Japan	
180	Shooto 2005: 11/6 in Korakuen Hall	November 6, 2005	Korakuen Hall	Tokyo, Japan	
179	Shooto: Soulful Fight	October 28, 2005	Kitazawa Town Hall	Tokyo, Japan	
178	Shooto: 9/23 in Korakuen Hall	September 23, 2005	Korakuen Hall	Tokyo, Japan	
177	G-Shooto: Plus03	September 16, 2005	Kitazawa Town Hall	Tokyo, Japan	
176	Shooto: Alive Road	August 20, 2005	Yokohama Cultural Gymnasium	Yokohama, Kanagawa, Japan	
175	Shooto 2005: 7/30 in Korakuen Hall	July 30, 2005	Korakuen Hall	Tokyo, Japan	
174	Shooto: Shooter's Summer	July 14, 2005	Kitazawa Town Hall	Tokyo, Japan	
173	G-Shooto: Plus02	July 12, 2005	Kitazawa Town Hall	Tokyo, Japan	
172	Shooto: Gig Central 8	July 3, 2005	Nagoya Trade and Industry Center Fukiage Hall	Nagoya, Aichi, Japan	
171	Shooto: 6/3 in Kitazawa Town Hall	June 3, 2005	Kitazawa Town Hall	Tokyo, Japan	
170	Shooto: 5/29 in Kitazawa Town Hall	May 29, 2005	Kitazawa Town Hall	Tokyo, Japan	
169	Shooto: Grapplingman 4	May 22, 2005	Tsuyama Community Hall	Okuyama, Japan	
168	G-Shooto: Special 01	May 11, 2005	Zepp Nagoya	Nagoya, Aichi, Japan	
167	Shooto: 5/8 in Osaka Prefectural Gymnasium	May 8, 2005	Osaka Prefectural Gymnasium	Osaka, Kansai, Japan	
166	Shooto: 5/4 in Korakuen Hall	May 4, 2005	Korakuen Hall	Tokyo, Japan	
165	Shooto: 4/23 in Hakata Star Lanes	April 23, 2005	Hakata Star Lanes	Hakata-ku, Fukuoka, Japan	
164	Shooto: Gig Central 7	March 27, 2005	Nagoya Civic Assembly Hall	Nagoya, Aichi, Japan	
163	G-Shooto: G-Shooto 02	March 12, 2005	Zepp Tokyo	Tokyo, Japan	
162	Shooto: 3/11 in Korakuen Hall	March 11, 2005	Korakuen Hall	Tokyo, Japan	
161	G-Shooto: Plus01	February 11, 2005	Shin-Kiba 1st Ring	Tokyo, Japan	
160	Shooto: 2/6 in Kitazawa Town Hall	February 6, 2005	Kitazawa Town Hall	Tokyo, Japan	
159	Shooto: 1/29 in Korakuen Hall	January 29, 2005	Korakuen Hall	Tokyo, Japan	
158	Shooto: Year End Show 2004	December 14, 2004	Yoyogi National Gymnasium	Tokyo, Japan	
157	G-Shooto: G-Shooto 01	November 26, 2004	Zepp Tokyo	Tokyo, Japan	
156	Shooto: Rookie Tournament 2004 Final	November 25, 2004	Kitazawa Town Hall	Tokyo, Japan	
155	Shooto: Wanna Shooto 2004	November 12, 2004	Korakuen Hall	Tokyo, Japan	
154	Shooto 2004: 10/17 in Osaka Prefectural Gymnasium	October 17, 2004	Osaka Prefectural Gymnasium	Osaka, Kansai, Japan	
153	Shooto: 9/26 in Kourakuen Hall	September 26, 2004	Korakuen Hall	Tokyo, Japan	
152	Shooto: Gig Central 6	September 12, 2004	Nagoya Civic Assembly Hall	Nagoya, Aichi, Japan	
151	Shooto: 7/16 in Korakuen Hall	July 16, 2004	Korakuen Hall	Tokyo, Japan	
150	Shooto 2004: 7/4 in Kitazawa Town Hall	July 4, 2004	Kitazawa Town Hall	Tokyo, Japan	
149	Shooto: Shooto Junkie Is Back!	June 27, 2004	Chiba Blue Field	Chiba, Japan	
148	Shooto 2004: 5/3 in Korakuen Hall	May 3, 2004	Korakuen Hall	Tokyo, Japan	
147	Shooto 2004: 4/16 in Kitazawa Town Hall	April 16, 2004	Kitazawa Town Hall	Tokyo, Japan	
146	Shooto 2004: 4/11 in Osaka Prefectural Gymnasium	April 11, 2004	Osaka Prefectural Gymnasium	Osaka, Kansai, Japan	
145	Shooto: Gig Central 5	March 28, 2004	Nagoya Civic Assembly Hall	Nagoya, Aichi, Japan	
144	Shooto: 3/22 in Korakuen Hall	March 22, 2004	Korakuen Hall	Tokyo, Japan	
143	Shooto: 3/4 in Kitazawa Town Hall	March 4, 2004	Kitazawa Town Hall	Tokyo, Japan	
142	Shooto 2004: 1/24 in Korakuen Hall	January 24, 2004	Korakuen Hall	Tokyo, Japan	
141	Shooto: Year End Show 2003	December 14, 2003	Tokyo Bay NK Hall	Urayasu, Chiba, Japan	
140	Shooto: 11/25 in Kitazawa Town Hall	November 25, 2003	Kitazawa Town Hall	Tokyo, Japan	
139	Shooto: Wanna Shooto 2003	November 3, 2003	Korakuen Hall	Tokyo, Japan	
138	Shooto: Who is Young Leader!	October 31, 2003	Kitazawa Town Hall	Tokyo, Japan	
137	Shooto: Gig West 4	October 12, 2003	Namba Grand Kagetsu Studio	Osaka, Kansai, Japan	
136	Shooto: Gig Central 4	September 21, 2003	Port Messe Nagoya	Nagoya, Aichi, Japan	
135	Shooto: 9/5 in Korakuen Hall	September 5, 2003	Korakuen Hall	Tokyo, Japan	
134	Shooto: 8/10 in Yokohama Cultural Gymnasium	August 10, 2003	Yokohama Cultural Gymnasium	Yokohama, Kanagawa, Japan	
133	Shooto: 7/13 in Korakuen Hall	July 13, 2003	Korakuen Hall	Tokyo, Japan	
132	Shooto 2003: 6/27 in Hiroshima Sun Plaza	June 27, 2003	Hiroshima Sun Plaza	Hiroshima, Japan	
131	Shooto: Shooter's Dream 2	May 30, 2003	Kitazawa Town Hall	Tokyo, Japan	
130	Shooto: 5/4 in Korakuen Hall	May 4, 2003	Korakuen Hall	Tokyo, Japan	
129	Shooto: Gig Central 3	March 30, 2003	Nagoya Civic Assembly Hall	Nagoya, Aichi, Japan	
128	Shooto: 3/18 in Korakuen Hall	March 18, 2003	Korakuen Hall	Tokyo, Japan	
127	Shooto: 2/23 in Korakuen Hall	February 23, 2003	Korakuen Hall	Tokyo, Japan	
126	Shooto: 2/6 in Kitazawa Town Hall	February 6, 2003	Kitazawa Town Hall	Tokyo, Japan	
125	Shooto: 1/24 in Korakuen Hall	January 24, 2003	Korakuen Hall	Tokyo, Japan	
124	Shooto: Year End Show 2002	December 14, 2002	Tokyo Bay NK Hall	Urayasu, Chiba, Japan	
123	Shooto: Treasure Hunt 11	November 15, 2002	Korakuen Hall	Tokyo, Japan	
122	Shooto: Gig West 3	October 27, 2002	Namba Grand Kagetsu Studio	Osaka, Kansai, Japan	
121	Shooto: Gig Central 2	October 6, 2002	Nagoya Civic Assembly Hall	Nagoya, Aichi, Japan	
120	Shooto: Gig East 11	September 25, 2002	Kitazawa Town Hall	Tokyo, Japan	
119	Shooto: Treasure Hunt 10	September 2002	Yokohama Cultural Gymnasium	Yokohama, Kanagawa, Japan	
118	Shooto: Gig East 10	August 16, 2002	Kitazawa Town Hall	Tokyo, Japan	
117	Shooto: Treasure Hunt 9	July 27, 2002	Kitazawa Town Hall	Tokyo, Japan	
116	Shooto: Treasure Hunt 8	July 19, 2002	Korakuen Hall	Tokyo, Japan	
115	Shooto: Treasure Hunt 7	June 29, 2002	Kanaoka Park Gymnasium	Sakai, Osaka, Japan	
114	Shooto: Gig East 9	May 28, 2002	Kitazawa Town Hall	Tokyo, Japan	
113	Shooto: Treasure Hunt 6	May 5, 2002	Korakuen Hall	Tokyo, Japan	
112	Shooto: Wanna Shooto Japan	April 21, 2002	Kitazawa Town Hall	Tokyo, Japan	
111	Shooto: Wanna Shooto 2002	April 14, 2002	Kitazawa Town Hall	Tokyo, Japan	
110	Shooto: Gig Central 1	March 31, 2002	Nagoya Civic Assembly Hall	Nagoya, Aichi, Japan	
109	Shooto: Treasure Hunt 5	March 15, 2002	Korakuen Hall	Tokyo, Japan	
108	Shooto: Treasure Hunt 4	March 13, 2002	Kitazawa Town Hall	Tokyo, Japan	
107	Shooto: Gig East 8	February 28, 2002	Kitazawa Town Hall	Tokyo, Japan	
106	Shooto: Treasure Hunt 3	February 11, 2002	Kobe Fashion Mart	Kobe, Hyogo, Japan	
105	Shooto: Treasure Hunt 2	January 25, 2002	Kitazawa Town Hall	Tokyo, Japan	
104	Shooto: Treasure Hunt 1	January 12, 2002	Korakuen Hall	Tokyo, Japan	
103	Shooto: To The Top Final Act	December 16, 2001	Tokyo Bay NK Hall	Urayasu, Chiba, Japan	
102	Shooto: Gig East 7	November 26, 2001	Kitazawa Town Hall	Tokyo, Japan	
101	Shooto: To The Top 10	November 25, 2001	Differ Ariake Arena	Tokyo, Japan	
100	Shooto: Gig East 6	October 23, 2001	Kitazawa Town Hall	Tokyo, Japan	
99	Shooto: To The Top 9	September 27, 2001	Kitazawa Town Hall	Tokyo, Japan	
98	Shooto: Gig West 2	September 23, 2001	Namba Grand Kagetsu Studio	Osaka, Kansai, Japan	
97	Shooto: To The Top 8	September 2, 2001	Korakuen Hall	Tokyo, Japan	
96	Shooto: To The Top 7	August 26, 2001	Osaka Prefectural Gymnasium	Osaka, Kansai, Japan	
95	Shooto: Gig East 5	August 15, 2001	Kitazawa Town Hall	Tokyo, Japan	
94	Shooto: Gig East 4	July 27, 2001	Kitazawa Town Hall	Tokyo, Japan	
93	Shooto: To The Top 6	July 6, 2001	Korakuen Hall	Tokyo, Japan	
92	Shooto: To The Top 5	June 30, 2001	Kitazawa Town Hall	Tokyo, Japan	
91	Shooto: Gig East 3	June 14, 2001	Kitazawa Town Hall	Tokyo, Japan	
90	Shooto: Gig East 2	May 22, 2001	Kitazawa Town Hall	Tokyo, Japan	
89	Shooto: To The Top 4	May 1, 2001	Korakuen Hall	Tokyo, Japan	
88	Shooto: Gig East 1	April 28, 2001	Kitazawa Town Hall	Tokyo, Japan	
87	Shooto: Wanna Shooto 2001	April 8, 2001	Kitazawa Town Hall	Tokyo, Japan	
86	Shooto: To The Top 3	March 21, 2001	Kitazawa Town Hall	Tokyo, Japan	
85	Shooto: To The Top 2	March 2, 2001	Korakuen Hall	Tokyo, Japan	
84	Shooto: Gig West 1	February 18, 2001	Namba Grand Kagetsu Studio	Osaka, Kansai, Japan	
83	Shooto: To The Top 1	January 19, 2001	Korakuen Hall	Tokyo, Japan	
82	Shooto: R.E.A.D. Final	December 17, 2000	Tokyo Bay NK Hall	Urayasu, Chiba, Japan	
81	Shooto: R.E.A.D. 12	November 12, 2000	Korakuen Hall	Tokyo, Japan	
80	Shooto: R.E.A.D. 11	October 9, 2000	Kitazawa Town Hall	Tokyo, Japan	
79	Shooto: R.E.A.D. 10	September 15, 2000	Korakuen Hall	Tokyo, Japan	
78	Shooto: R.E.A.D. 9	August 27, 2000	Yokohama Cultural Gymnasium	Yokohama, Kanagawa, Japan	
77	Shooto: R.E.A.D. 8	August 4, 2000	Osaka Prefectural Gymnasium	Osaka, Kansai, Japan	
76	Shooto: R.E.A.D. 7	July 22, 2000	Kitazawa Town Hall	Tokyo, Japan	
75	Shooto: R.E.A.D. 6	July 16, 2000	Korakuen Hall	Tokyo, Japan	
74	Shooto: R.E.A.D. 5	May 22, 2000	Korakuen Hall	Tokyo, Japan	
73	Shooto: R.E.A.D. 4	April 12, 2000	Kitazawa Town Hall	Tokyo, Japan	
72	Shooto: R.E.A.D. 3	April 2, 2000	Namihaya Dome	Kadoma, Osaka, Japan	
71	Shooto: R.E.A.D. 2	March 17, 2000	Korakuen Hall	Tokyo, Japan	
70	Shooto: R.E.A.D. 1	January 14, 2000	Korakuen Hall	Tokyo, Japan	
69	Shooto: Gateway to the Extremes	November 4, 1999	Kitazawa Town Hall	Tokyo, Japan	
68	Shooto: Renaxis 5	October 29, 1999	Namihaya Dome	Kadoma, Osaka, Japan	
67	Shooto: Shooter's Ambition	October 6, 1999	Kitazawa Town Hall	Tokyo, Japan	
66	Shooto: Renaxis 4	September 5, 1999	Korakuen Hall	Tokyo, Japan	
65	Shooto: Renaxis 3	August 4, 1999	Kitazawa Town Hall	Tokyo, Japan	
64	Shooto: Renaxis 2	July 16, 1999	Korakuen Hall	Tokyo, Japan	
63	Shooto: 10th Anniversary Event	May 29, 1999	Yokohama Cultural Gymnasium	Yokohama, Kanagawa, Japan	
62	Shooto: Shooter's Passion	May 27, 1999	Kitazawa Town Hall	Tokyo, Japan	
61	Shooto: Gig '99	April 9, 1999	Kitazawa Town Hall	Tokyo, Japan	
60	Shooto: Renaxis 1	March 28, 1999	Korakuen Hall	Tokyo, Japan	
59	Shooto: Shooter's Soul	January 27, 1999	Kitazawa Town Hall	Tokyo, Japan	
58	Shooto: Devilock Fighters	January 15, 1999	Korakuen Hall	Tokyo, Japan	
57	Shooto: Las Grandes Viajes 6	November 27, 1998	Korakuen Hall	Tokyo, Japan	
56	Shooto: Shooter's Dream	September 18, 1998	Kitazawa Town Hall	Tokyo, Japan	
55	Shooto: Las Grandes Viajes 5	August 29, 1998	Korakuen Hall	Tokyo, Japan	
54	Shooto: Las Grandes Viajes 4	July 29, 1998	Korakuen Hall	Tokyo, Japan	
53	Shooto: Gig '98 2nd	July 18, 1998	Kitazawa Town Hall	Tokyo, Japan	
52	Shooto: Las Grandes Viajes 3	May 1998	Korakuen Hall	Tokyo, Japan	
51	Shooto: Shoot the Shooto XX	April 26, 1998	Yokohama Arena	Yokohama, Kanagawa, Japan	
50	Shooto: Gig '98 1st	April 10, 1998	Kitazawa Town Hall	Tokyo, Japan	
49	Shooto: Las Grandes Viajes 2	March 1, 1998	Korakuen Hall	Tokyo, Japan	
48	Shooto: Las Grandes Viajes 1	January 17, 1998	Korakuen Hall	Tokyo, Japan	
47	Shooto: Reconquista 4	October 12, 1997	Korakuen Hall	Tokyo, Japan	
46	Shooto: Reconquista 3	August 27, 1997	Korakuen Hall	Tokyo, Japan	
45	Shooto: Gig	June 25, 1997	Kitazawa Town Hall	Tokyo, Japan	
44	Shooto: Reconquista 2	April 6, 1997	Korakuen Hall	Tokyo, Japan	
43	Shooto: Reconquista 1	January 18, 1997	Korakuen Hall	Tokyo, Japan	
42	Shooto: Let's Get Lost	October 4, 1996	Korakuen Hall	Tokyo, Japan	
41	Shooto: Free Fight Kawasaki	July 28, 1996	Club Citta	Kawasaki, Kanagawa, Japan	
40	Shooto: Vale Tudo Junction 3	May 7, 1996	Korakuen Hall	Tokyo, Japan	
39	Shooto: Vale Tudo Junction 2	March 5, 1996	Korakuen Hall	Tokyo, Japan	
38	Shooto: Vale Tudo Junction 1	January 20, 1996	Korakuen Hall	Tokyo, Japan	
37	Shooto: Tokyo Free Fight	November 7, 1995	Korakuen Hall	Tokyo, Japan	
36	Shooto: Vale Tudo Perception	September 26, 1995	Komazawa Olympic Park Gymnasium	Tokyo, Japan	
35	Shooto: Complete Vale Tudo Access	July 29, 1995	Omiya Skating Center	Omiya, Saitama, Japan	
34	Shooto: Yokohama Free Fight	June 4, 1995		Japan	
33	Shooto: Vale Tudo Access 4	May 12, 1995		Japan	
32	Shooto: Vale Tudo Access 3	January 21, 1995	Korakuen Hall	Tokyo, Japan	
31	Shooto: Vale Tudo Access 2	November 7, 1994	Korakuen Hall	Tokyo, Japan	
30	Shooto: Vale Tudo Access 1	September 26, 1994	Korakuen Hall	Tokyo, Japan	
29	Shooto: Shooto	May 6, 1994	Korakuen Hall	Tokyo, Japan	
28	Shooto: Shooto	March 18, 1994	Korakuen Hall	Tokyo, Japan	
27	Shooto: New Stage Battle of Wrestling	March 11, 1994	Korakuen Hall	Tokyo, Japan	
26	Shooto: Shooto	January 14, 1994	Korakuen Hall	Tokyo, Japan	
25	Shooto: Shooto	November 25, 1993	Korakuen Hall	Tokyo, Japan	
24	Shooto: Shooto	June 24, 1993	Korakuen Hall	Tokyo, Japan	
23	Shooto: Shooto	April 26, 1993	Korakuen Hall	Tokyo, Japan	
22	Shooto: Shooto	February 26, 1993	Korakuen Hall	Tokyo, Japan	
21	Shooto: Shooto	November 27, 1992	Korakuen Hall	Tokyo, Japan	
20	Shooto: Shooto	September 25, 1992	Korakuen Hall	Tokyo, Japan	
19	Shooto: Shooto	July 23, 1992	Korakuen Hall	Tokyo, Japan	
18	Shooto: Shooto	May 29, 1992	Korakuen Hall	Tokyo, Japan	
17	Shooto: Shooto	March 27, 1992	Korakuen Hall	Tokyo, Japan	
16	Shooto: Shooto	December 23, 1991	Korakuen Hall	Tokyo, Japan	
15	Shooto: Shooto	October 17, 1991	Osaka Prefectural Gymnasium	Osaka, Kansai, Japan	
14	Shooto: Shooto	August 25, 1991	Korakuen Hall	Tokyo, Japan	
13	Shooto: Shooto	August 3, 1991	Korakuen Hall	Tokyo, Japan	
12	Shooto: Shooto	May 31, 1991	Korakuen Hall	Tokyo, Japan	
11	Shooto: Shooto	March 29, 1991	Korakuen Hall	Tokyo, Japan	
10	Shooto: Shooto	January 13, 1991	Korakuen Hall	Tokyo, Japan	
9	Shooto: Shooto	November 28, 1990	Korakuen Hall	Tokyo, Japan	
8	Shooto: Shooto	September 8, 1990	Korakuen Hall	Tokyo, Japan	
7	Shooto: Shooto	July 7, 1990	Korakuen Hall	Tokyo, Japan	
6	Shooto: Shooto	May 12, 1990	Korakuen Hall	Tokyo, Japan	
5	Shooto: Shooto	March 17, 1990	Korakuen Hall	Tokyo, Japan	
4	Shooto: Shooto	January 13, 1990	Korakuen Hall	Tokyo, Japan	
3	Shooto: Shooto	October 19, 1989	Korakuen Hall	Tokyo, Japan	
2	Shooto: Shooto	July 29, 1989	Yoyogi National Stadium Second Gymnasium	Tokyo, Japan	
1	Shooto: Shooto	May 18, 1989	Korakuen Hall	Tokyo, Japan	

== See also ==
- Shooto
- List of Shooto champions
