= Symbol Tower =

Symbol Tower may refer to:

- Takamatsu Symbol Tower
- Yokohama Port Symbol Tower
