= Hiroki Kita =

Japanese mixed martial artist

Hiroki Kita 北博樹
- Born: October 29, 1969 (age 56); Japan
- Nationality: Japanese
- Height: 5 ft 7 in (1.70 m)
- Weight: 132 lb (60 kg; 9.4 st)
- Division: Bantamweight
- Team: Paraestra Tokyo
- Years active: 1999 - 2009

Mixed martial arts record
- Total: 9
- Wins: 2
- By decision: 2
- Losses: 6
- By knockout: 1
- By submission: 1
- By decision: 4
- Draws: 1

Other information
- Mixed martial arts record from Sherdog

Hiroki Kita Japanese: 北博樹 (born October 29, 1969) is a Japanese mixed martial artist. He competed in the Bantamweight division.

== Mixed martial arts record ==
Professional record breakdown
9 matches	2 wins	6 losses
By knockout	0	1
By submission	0	1
By decision	2	4
Draws	1	

Res.	Record	Opponent	Method	Event	Date	Round	Time	Location	Notes
Loss	2-6-1	Yoshitaka Okigi	Submission (armbar)	Shooto: Gig Tokyo 3	October 18, 2009	1	3:28	Tokyo, Japan	
Loss	2-5-1	Hayate Usui	Decision (unanimous)	Shooto: Battle Mix Tokyo 1	January 26, 2007	2	5:00	Tokyo, Japan	
Loss	2-4-1	Akitoshi Hokazono	TKO (punches)	Shooto: 7/13 in Korakuen Hall	July 13, 2003	1	3:07	Tokyo, Japan	
Loss	2-3-1	Hiroshi Umemura	Decision (unanimous)	Shooto: Gig Central 3	March 30, 2003	2	5:00	Nagoya, Aichi, Japan	
Loss	2-2-1	Akira Komatsu	Decision (unanimous)	Shooto: Treasure Hunt 9	July 27, 2002	2	5:00	Setagaya, Tokyo, Japan	
Win	2-1-1	Manabu Kano	Decision (unanimous)	Shooto: Wanna Shooto Japan	April 21, 2002	2	5:00	Setagaya, Tokyo, Japan	
Win	1-1-1	Akira Kibe	Decision (majority)	Shooto: Gig East 7	November 26, 2001	2	5:00	Tokyo, Japan	
Draw	0-1-1	Daiji Takahashi	Draw	Shooto: R.E.A.D. 11	October 9, 2000	2	5:00	Setagaya, Tokyo, Japan	
Loss	0-1	Norio Nishiyama	Decision (unanimous)	Shooto: Shooter's Ambition	October 6, 1999	2	5:00	Setagaya, Tokyo, Japan	

== See also ==
- List of male mixed martial artists
