= Takeyasu Hirono =

Japanese mixed martial artist

Takeyasu Hirono 廣野武康
- Born: July 18, 1971 (age 55); Japan
- Nationality: Japanese
- Height: 5 ft 1 in (1.55 m)
- Weight: 123 lb (56 kg; 8.8 st)
- Division: Flyweight
- Team: Wajutsu Keishukai Gods
- Years active: 1998 - 2009

Mixed martial arts record
- Total: 29
- Wins: 9
- By submission: 3
- By decision: 6
- Losses: 16
- By knockout: 3
- By decision: 13
- Draws: 4

Other information
- Mixed martial arts record from Sherdog

Takeyasu Hirono (born July 18, 1971; Japanese: 廣野武康) is a Japanese mixed martial artist. He competed in the Flyweight division.

== Mixed martial arts record ==
Professional record breakdown
29 matches	9 wins	16 losses
By knockout	0	3
By submission	3	0
By decision	6	13
Draws	4	

Res.	Record	Opponent	Method	Event	Date	Round	Time	Location	Notes
Loss	9-16-4	Isao Hirose	Decision (unanimous)	Pancrase: Changing Tour 2	April 5, 2009	2	5:00	Tokyo, Japan	
Win	9-15-4	Yoshihiro Matsunaga	Decision (unanimous)	GCM: Cage Force 9	December 6, 2008	3	3:00	Tokyo, Japan	
Loss	8-15-4	Jesse Taitano	KO (knee)	PXC 14: Evolution	March 10, 2008	1	0:00	Mangilao, Guam	
Loss	8-14-4	Tsuyoshi Okada	Decision (split)	Shooto: Grapplingman 6	May 13, 2007	2	5:00	Hiroshima, Japan	
Draw	8-13-4	Tsuyoshi Okada	Draw	GCM: Cage Force EX Western Bound	February 17, 2007	2	5:00	Tottori, Japan	
Loss	8-13-3	Yasuhiro Akagi	Decision (unanimous)	Shooto: Gig Central 10	September 17, 2006	2	5:00	Nagoya, Aichi, Japan	
Loss	8-12-3	Yusei Shimokawa	Decision (unanimous)	Shooto 2006: 5/28 in Kitazawa Town Hall	May 28, 2006	2	5:00	Setagaya, Tokyo, Japan	
Win	8-11-3	Jesse Taitano	Decision (split)	FFCF 4: Collision	December 10, 2005	3	5:00	Guam	
Win	7-11-3	Oliver Moriano	Submission (armbar)	GCM: D.O.G. 3	September 17, 2005	1	3:10	Tokyo, Japan	
Win	6-11-3	Keisuke Kurata	Decision (majority)	Shooto: Gig Central 8	July 3, 2005	2	5:00	Tokyo, Japan	
Loss	5-11-3	Setsu Iguchi	TKO (cut)	GCM: D.O.G. 1	March 12, 2005	2	5:00	Tokyo, Japan	
Win	5-10-3	Naoto Sato	Submission (rear naked choke)	GCM: CanD	October 24, 2004	1	4:30	Tokyo, Japan	
Win	4-10-3	Minoru Tsuiki	Decision (majority)	GCM: Demolition 040711	July 11, 2004	2	5:00	Tokyo, Japan	
Loss	3-10-3	Setsu Iguchi	Decision (unanimous)	GCM: Demolition 040408	April 8, 2004	2	5:00	Tokyo, Japan	
Loss	3-9-3	Junji Ikoma	Decision (unanimous)	Shooto: Who is Young Leader!	October 31, 2003	3	5:00	Tokyo, Japan	
Loss	3-8-3	Rambaa Somdet	Decision (unanimous)	Deep: 7th Impact	December 8, 2002	3	5:00	Tokyo, Japan	
Loss	3-7-3	Homare Kuboyama	Decision (unanimous)	Shooto: Treasure Hunt 8	July 19, 2002	3	5:00	Tokyo, Japan	
Loss	3-6-3	Homare Kuboyama	Decision (split)	Shooto: Treasure Hunt 4	March 13, 2002	2	5:00	Setagaya, Tokyo, Japan	
Win	3-5-3	Tomohiro Hashi	Decision (majority)	Shooto: Treasure Hunt 1	January 12, 2002	2	5:00	Tokyo, Japan	
Loss	2-5-3	Kentaro Imaizumi	Decision (unanimous)	Shooto: To The Top 10	November 25, 2001	3	5:00	Tokyo, Japan	
Loss	2-4-3	Jin Akimoto	Decision (unanimous)	Shooto: To The Top 8	September 2, 2001	3	5:00	Tokyo, Japan	
Draw	2-3-3	Hiroaki Yoshioka	Draw	Shooto: To The Top 1	January 19, 2001	3	5:00	Tokyo, Japan	
Loss	2-3-2	Daiji Takahashi	Decision (majority)	Shooto: R.E.A.D. 7	July 22, 2000	2	5:00	Setagaya, Tokyo, Japan	
Loss	2-2-2	Shuichiro Katsumura	TKO (cut)	Shooto: R.E.A.D. 4	April 12, 2000	1	4:17	Setagaya, Tokyo, Japan	
Loss	2-1-2	Norio Nishiyama	Decision (unanimous)	Shooto: R.E.A.D. 1	January 14, 2000	2	5:00	Tokyo, Japan	
Win	2-0-2	Masaru Gokita	Decision (unanimous)	Shooto: Renaxis 4	September 5, 1999	2	5:00	Tokyo, Japan	
Draw	1-0-2	Jin Akimoto	Draw	Shooto: Gig '99	April 9, 1999	2	5:00	Tokyo, Japan	
Win	1-0-1	Doc Chee	Technical Submission (armbar)	GCM: Vale Tudo	August 29, 1998	1	4:38	Japan	
Draw	0-0-1	Mitsuhiro Sakamoto	Draw	Shooto: Las Grandes Viajes 4	July 29, 1998	2	5:00	Tokyo, Japan	

== See also ==
- List of male mixed martial artists
