= 2000 in Shooto =

Mixed martial arts events

Information
- First date: January 14, 2000
- Last date: December 17, 2000

Events
- Total events: 13

Fights
- Total fights: 101
- Title fights: 4

Chronology
1999 in Shooto	2000 in Shooto	2001 in Shooto

The year 2000 is the 12th year in the history of Shooto, a mixed martial arts promotion based in the Japan. In 2000 Shooto held 13 events beginning with, Shooto: R.E.A.D. 1.

== Title fights ==
Title fights in 2000
Weight class				Method	Round	Time	Event	Notes
Middleweight	Hayato Sakurai	def.	Tetsuji Kato	Decision (Split)	3	5:00	Shooto: R.E.A.D. 2	(Note: For The Middleweight Champion.)
Featherweight	Alexandre Franca Nogueira (c)	def.	Uchu Tatsumi	Submission (Guillotine Choke)	1	1:57	Shooto: R.E.A.D. 9	(Note: For The Featherweight Champion.)
Lightweight	Caol Uno	def.	Rumina Sato	KO (Punch)	1	2:21	Shooto: R.E.A.D. Final	(Note: For The Lightweight Champion.)
Bantamweight	Mamoru Yamaguchi	def.	Jin Akimoto	Decision (Unanimous)	3	5:00	Shooto: R.E.A.D. Final	(Note: For The Bantamweight Champion.)

== Events list ==
#	Event title	Date	Arena	Location
82	Shooto: R.E.A.D. Final	December 17, 2000	Tokyo Bay NK Hall	Urayasu, Chiba, Japan
81	Shooto: R.E.A.D. 12	November 12, 2000	Korakuen Hall	Tokyo, Japan
80	Shooto: R.E.A.D. 11	October 9, 2000	Kitazawa Town Hall	Setagaya, Tokyo, Japan
79	Shooto: R.E.A.D. 10	September 15, 2000	Korakuen Hall	Tokyo, Japan
78	Shooto: R.E.A.D. 9	August 27, 2000	Yokohama Cultural Gymnasium	Yokohama, Kanagawa, Japan
77	Shooto: R.E.A.D. 8	August 4, 2000	Osaka Prefectural Gymnasium	Osaka, Kansai, Japan
76	Shooto: R.E.A.D. 7	July 22, 2000	Kitazawa Town Hall	Setagaya, Tokyo, Japan
75	Shooto: R.E.A.D. 6	July 16, 2000	Korakuen Hall	Tokyo, Japan
74	Shooto: R.E.A.D. 5	May 22, 2000	Korakuen Hall	Tokyo, Japan
73	Shooto: R.E.A.D. 4	April 12, 2000	Kitazawa Town Hall	Setagaya, Tokyo, Japan
72	Shooto: R.E.A.D. 3	April 2, 2000	Namihaya Dome	Kadoma, Osaka, Japan
71	Shooto: R.E.A.D. 2	March 17, 2000	Korakuen Hall	Tokyo, Japan
70	Shooto: R.E.A.D. 1	January 14, 2000	Korakuen Hall	Tokyo, Japan

== Shooto: R.E.A.D. 1 ==
Shooto: R.E.A.D. 1 was an event held on January 14, 2000, at Korakuen Hall in Tokyo, Japan.

=== Results ===
Main Card
Weight class				Method	Round	Time	Notes
	Ray Cooper	def.	Jutaro Nakao	Decision (Unanimous)	3	5:00
	Larry Papadopoulos	vs.	Akihiro Gono	Draw	3	5:00
	Yuki Sasaki	def.	Ronald Jhun	Submission (Triangle Armbar)	3	2:20
	Norio Nishiyama	def.	Takeyasu Hirono	Decision (Unanimous)	2	5:00
	John Calvo	def.	Jun Kitagawa	Decision (Unanimous)	2	5:00
	Izuru Takeuchi	def.	Shiko Yamashita	Decision (Unanimous)	2	5:00
	Hiroshi Tsuruya	def.	Masakazu Kuramochi	Submission (Armbar)	1	1:51
	Kohei Yasumi	def.	Yohei Nanbu	Decision (Majority)	2	5:00
	Yohei Suzuki	def.	Mitsuo Matsumoto	Decision (Unanimous)	2	5:00
	Makoto Ishikawa	def.	Jinzaburo Yonezawa	Decision (Unanimous)	2	5:00

== Shooto: R.E.A.D. 2 ==
Shooto: R.E.A.D. 2 was an event held on March 17, 2000, at Korakuen Hall in Tokyo, Japan.

=== Results ===
Main Card
Weight class				Method	Round	Time	Notes
Middleweight	Hayato Sakurai	def.	Tetsuji Kato	Decision (Split)	3	5:00	(Note: For The Middleweight Champion.)
	Takuya Kuwabara	def.	Johnny Eduardo	Decision (Unanimous)	3	5:00
	Din Thomas	def.	Dokonjonosuke Mishima	TKO (Doctor Stoppage)	2	3:37
	Mamoru Yamaguchi	vs.	Masaru Gokita	Draw	2	5:00
	Yoshinobu Ota	def.	Norio Nishiyama	Technical Submission (Rear-Naked Choke)	1	0:28
	Isao Tanimura	def.	Takaharu Murahama	Decision (Unanimous)	2	5:00

== Shooto: R.E.A.D. 3 ==
Shooto: R.E.A.D. 3 was an event held on April 2, 2000, at The Namihaya Dome in Kadoma, Osaka, Japan.

=== Results ===
Main Card
Weight class				Method	Round	Time	Notes
	Caol Uno	def.	Dennis Hallman	Decision (Unanimous)	3	5:00
	Alexandre Franca Nogueira	def.	Mamoru Okochi	Decision (Unanimous)	3	5:00
	Masanori Suda	def.	Yuki Sasaki	Decision (Unanimous)	3	5:00
	Takanori Gomi	def.	Anderson Pavao	Decision (Unanimous)	3	5:00
	Saburo Kawakatsu	def.	Tomonori Ohara	Submission (Armbar)	1	2:26
	Hiroshi Umemura	def.	Fumio Usami	TKO (Punches)	1	2:03
	Yuji Kusu	vs.	Seichi Ikemoto	Draw	2	5:00
	Masashi Kita	def.	Ryota Ibaraki	Submission (Armbar)	1	4:03

== Shooto: R.E.A.D. 4 ==
Shooto: R.E.A.D. 4 was an event held on April 12, 2000, at Kitazawa Town Hall in Setagaya, Tokyo, Japan.

=== Results ===
Main Card
Weight class				Method	Round	Time	Notes
	Jin Akimoto	def.	Greg Piper	Submission (Armbar)	1	2:29
	Shuichiro Katsumura	def.	Takeyasu Hirono	TKO (Cut)	1	4:17
	Ryan Bow	def.	Masato Fujiwara	KO (Knees)	1	2:19
	Tetsuo Katsuta	def.	Teruyuki Hashimoto	Submission (Rear-Naked Choke)	1	4:29
	Makoto Ishikawa	def.	Kazumichi Takada	Decision (Unanimous)	2	5:00
	Shigetoshi Iwase	def.	Takayuki Okochi	Decision (Majority)	2	5:00
	Takumi Nakayama	def.	Tatsuya Kawajiri	Submission (Rear-Naked Choke)	1	2:44
	Hiroaki Yoshioka	def.	Daiji Takahashi	Decision (Split)	2	5:00

== Shooto: R.E.A.D. 5 ==
Shooto: R.E.A.D. 5 was an event held on May 22, 2000, at Korakuen Hall in Tokyo, Japan.

=== Results ===
Main Card
Weight class				Method	Round	Time	Notes
	Takuya Kuwabara	vs.	Ian James Schaffa	Draw	3	5:00
	Akihiro Gono	def.	Andy Wang	Decision (Unanimous)	3	5:00
	Baret Yoshida	def.	Masahiro Oishi	Submission (Rear Naked Choke)	2	1:48
	Alex Cook	def.	Isao Tanimura	KO (Punches)	1	1:27
	Hiroyuki Abe	def.	Kimihito Nonaka	Decision (Unanimous)	2	5:00
	Ryan Bow	def.	Takaharu Murahama	Decision (Majority)	2	5:00
	Takuya Wada	vs.	Seichi Ikemoto	Draw	2	5:00
	Koji Takeuchi	def.	Makoto Ishikawa	Decision (Majority)	2	5:00
	Kazuhiro Inoue	def.	Katsuya Toida	Decision (Majority)	2	5:00

== Shooto: R.E.A.D. 6 ==
Shooto: R.E.A.D. 6 was an event held on July 16, 2000, at Korakuen Hall in Tokyo, Japan.

=== Results ===
Main Card
Weight class				Method	Round	Time	Notes
	Naoya Uematsu	def.	Joey Gilbert	Submission (Achilles Lock)	2	3:22
	Takanori Gomi	def.	Paul Rodriguez	Decision (Unanimous)	3	5:00
	Lance Gibson	def.	Masanori Suda	Decision (Majority)	3	5:00
	Kohei Yasumi	def.	Chikara Miyake	Decision (Unanimous)	2	5:00
	Hiroshi Tsuruya	def.	Tomonori Ohara	Submission (Kimura)	1	0:50
	Takumi Nakayama	vs.	Koji Takeuchi	Draw	2	5:00
	Yohei Suzuki	def.	Kazumichi Takada	Decision (Unanimous)	2	5:00

== Shooto: R.E.A.D. 7 ==
Shooto: R.E.A.D. 7 was an event held on July 22, 2000, at Kitazawa Town Hall in Setagaya, Tokyo, Japan.

=== Results ===
Main Card
Weight class				Method	Round	Time	Notes
	Uchu Tatsumi	def.	Anthony Hamlett	Submission (Rear Naked Choke)	1	2:49
	Tetsuo Katsuta	def.	Kazuhiro Inoue	Decision (Unanimous)	2	5:00
	Daiji Takahashi	def.	Takeyasu Hirono	Decision (Majority)	2	5:00
	Hiroaki Yoshioka	def.	Shuichiro Katsumura	Submission (Armbar)	2	3:43
	Masaki Nishizawa	def.	Norio Nishiyama	Decision (Unanimous)	2	5:00
	Katsuya Toida	def.	Takeru Ueno	Decision (Unanimous)	2	5:00
	Mitsuo Matsumoto	vs.	Hiroki Kotani	Draw	2	5:00

== Shooto: R.E.A.D. 8 ==
Shooto: R.E.A.D. 8 was an event held on August 4, 2000, at The Osaka Prefectural Gymnasium in Osaka, Japan.

=== Results ===
Main Card
Weight class				Method	Round	Time	Notes
	Hayato Sakurai	def.	Luiz Azeredo	Decision (Unanimous)	3	5:00
	Dan Gilbert	def.	Jutaro Nakao	TKO (Doctor Stoppage)	3	4:02
	Dokonjonosuke Mishima	def.	Justin Wisniewski	Submission (Cobra Hold)	1	1:30
	Saburo Kawakatsu	def.	Seichi Ikemoto	Decision (Unanimous)	2	5:00
	Yoshihiro Fujita	vs.	Masashi Kameda	Draw	2	5:00
	Hirotaka Yokoi	def.	Masaya Inoue	Decision (Majority)	2	5:00

== Shooto: R.E.A.D. 9 ==
Shooto: R.E.A.D. 9 was an event held on August 27, 2000, at The Yokohama Cultural Gymnasium in Yokohama, Kanagawa, Japan.

=== Results ===
Main Card
Weight class				Method	Round	Time	Notes
Featherweight	Alexandre Franca Nogueira (c)	def.	Uchu Tatsumi	Submission (Guillotine Choke)	1	1:57	(Note: For The Featherweight Champion.)
	Marcio Ramos Barbosa	def.	Caol Uno	Technical Submission (Guillotine Choke)	3	1:49
	Rumina Sato	def.	Takuya Kuwabara	Technical Decision (Unanimous)	2	5:00
	Mamoru Yamaguchi	def.	Yoshinobu Ota	KO (Knee)	3	2:21
	Dokonjonosuke Mishima	vs.	Marcio Feitosa	Draw	3	5:00
	Takaharu Murahama	def.	Sergei Bytchkov	KO (Flying Knee)	1	0:11
	Yuji Kusu	vs.	Takuya Wada	Draw	2	5:00
	Hiroshi Tsuruya	vs.	Seichi Ikemoto	Draw	2	5:00

== Shooto: R.E.A.D. 10 ==
Shooto: R.E.A.D. 10 was an event held on September 15, 2000, at Korakuen Hall in Tokyo, Japan.

=== Results ===
Main Card
Weight class				Method	Round	Time	Notes
	Naoya Uematsu	def.	Noboru Asahi	Decision (Majority)	3	5:00
	Tetsuji Kato	def.	Thomas Denny	Decision (Unanimous)	3	5:00
	Baret Yoshida	def.	Mamoru Okochi	Decision (Majority)	3	5:00
	Stephen Palling	def.	Hiroyuki Abe	KO (Punches)	2	2:23
	Tetsuo Katsuta	def.	Hiroshi Umemura	Decision (Unanimous)	2	5:00
	Hiroaki Yoshioka	def.	Masaru Gokita	KO (Head Kick)	1	0:17
	Takumi Nakayama	def.	Takuhito Hida	Decision (Majority)	2	5:00

== Shooto: R.E.A.D. 11 ==
Shooto: R.E.A.D. 11 was an event held on October 9, 2000, at Kitazawa Town Hall in Setagaya, Tokyo, Japan.

=== Results ===
Main Card
Weight class				Method	Round	Time	Notes
	Seichi Ikemoto	def.	Damien Riccio	TKO (Punches)	1	2:09
	Kazuhiro Inoue	def.	Takeru Ueno	Decision (Unanimous)	2	5:00
	Hiroki Kita	vs.	Daiji Takahashi	Draw	2	5:00
	Shiko Yamashita	def.	Matthias Riccio	Submission (Armbar)	1	1:18
	Takashi Ochi	def.	Jinzaburo Yonezawa	Decision (Majority)	2	5:00
	Kentaro Imaizumi	def.	Homare Kuboyama	Decision (Unanimous)	2	5:00
	Ryota Matsune	def.	Katsuhisa Akasaki	Decision (Unanimous)	2	5:00

== Shooto: R.E.A.D. 12 ==
Shooto: R.E.A.D. 12 was an event held on November 12, 2000, at Korakuen Hall in Tokyo, Japan.

=== Results ===
Main Card
Weight class				Method	Round	Time	Notes
	Akihiro Gono	def.	Masanori Suda	Decision (Unanimous)	3	5:00
	Takanori Gomi	def.	Ryan Bow	Decision (Unanimous)	3	5:00
	Kimihito Nonaka	def.	Mamoru Okochi	Decision (Unanimous)	3	5:00
	Martijn de Jong	def.	Yuki Sasaki	Submission (Triangle Choke)	1	0:40
	Saburo Kawakatsu	def.	Chad W. Saunders	Decision (Unanimous)	2	5:00
	Takaharu Murahama	vs.	Koji Takeuchi	Draw	2	5:00
	Takuya Wada	def.	Rafles la Rose	Decision (Unanimous)	2	5:00
	Yohei Nanbu	vs.	Takumi Nakayama	Draw	2	5:00
	Katsuya Toida	def.	Hiroshi Umemura	Submission (Armbar)	1	2:07
	Takayuki Okochi	def.	Matthias Riccio	Decision (Majority)	2	5:00
	Hideki Kadowaki	def.	Takashi Ochi	Submission (Rear-Naked Choke)	1	4:10

== Shooto: R.E.A.D. Final ==
Shooto: R.E.A.D. Final was an event held on December 17, 2000, at The Tokyo Bay NK Hall in Urayasu, Chiba, Japan.

=== Results ===
Main Card
Weight class				Method	Round	Time	Notes
Lightweight	Caol Uno	def.	Rumina Sato	KO (Punch)	1	2:21	(Note: For The Lightweight Champion.)
Bantamweight	Mamoru Yamaguchi	def.	Jin Akimoto	Decision (Unanimous)	3	5:00	(Note: For The Bantamweight Champion.)
	Hayato Sakurai	def.	Frank Trigg	TKO (Knees)	2	2:25
	Alexandre Franca Nogueira	def.	Stephen Palling	Submission (Guillotine Choke)	2	1:19
	Dokonjonosuke Mishima	def.	Marcio Ramos Barbosa	Submission (Kneebar)	2	4:51
	Tetsuji Kato	def.	Dan Gilbert	Submission (Rear Naked Choke)	1	4:28
	Alex Cook	def.	Ray Cooper	Submission (Neck Crank)	1	1:44

== See also ==
- Shooto
- List of Shooto champions
- List of Shooto Events
