= Norio Nishiyama =

Japanese mixed martial artist

Norio Nishiyama 西山典男
- Born: Japan
- Nationality: Japanese
- Weight: 132 lb (60 kg; 9.4 st)
- Division: Flyweight; Bantamweight
- Team: K'z Factory
- Years active: 1999 - 2000

Mixed martial arts record
- Total: 6
- Wins: 2
- By decision: 2
- Losses: 3
- By submission: 1
- By decision: 2
- Draws: 1

Other information
- Mixed martial arts record from Sherdog

Norio Nishiyama (Japanese: 西山 典男, Hepburn: Nishiyama Norio) is a Japanese mixed martial artist. He competed in the Flyweight and Bantamweight divisions between 1999 and 2000.

== Mixed martial arts record ==
Professional record breakdown
6 matches	2 wins	3 losses
By submission	0	1
By decision	2	2
Draws	1	

Res.	Record	Opponent	Method	Event	Date	Round	Time	Location	Notes
Loss	2-2-1	Masaki Nishizawa	Decision (unanimous)	Shooto: R.E.A.D. 7	July 22, 2000	2	5:00	Setagaya, Tokyo, Japan	
Loss	2-2-1	Yoshinobu Ota	Technical Submission (rear-naked choke)	Shooto: R.E.A.D. 2	March 17, 2000	1	0:28	Tokyo, Japan	
Win	2-1-1	Takeyasu Hirono	Decision (unanimous)	Shooto: R.E.A.D. 1	January 14, 2000	2	5:00	Tokyo, Japan	
Win	1-1-1	Hiroki Kita	Decision (unanimous)	Shooto: Shooter's Ambition	October 6, 1999	2	5:00	Setagaya, Tokyo, Japan	
Loss	0-1-1	Yoshinobu Ota	Decision (unanimous)	Shooto: Renaxis 3	August 4, 1999	2	5:00	Setagaya, Tokyo, Japan	
Draw	0-0-1	Mitsuhiro Sakamoto	Draw	Shooto: Shooter's Passion	May 27, 1999	2	5:00	Setagaya, Tokyo, Japan	

== See also ==
- List of male mixed martial artists
