= 2002 in Shooto =

Mixed martial arts events

Information
- First date: January 12, 2002
- Last date: December 14, 2002

Events
- Total events: 21

Fights
- Total fights: 146
- Title fights: 4

Chronology
2001 in Shooto	2002 in Shooto	2003 in Shooto

The year 2002 is the 14th year in the history of Shooto, a mixed martial arts promotion based in Japan. In 2002 Shooto held 21 events beginning with, Shooto: Treasure Hunt 1.

== Title fights ==
Title fights in 2002
Weight class				Method	Round	Time	Event	Notes
Middleweight	Masanori Suda	def.	Lance Gibson	Decision (Unanimous)	3	5:00	Shooto: Treasure Hunt 1	(Note: For the Middleweight Champion.)
Bantamweight	Masahiro Oishi (c)	vs.	Hisao Ikeda	Draw	3	5:00	Shooto: Treasure Hunt 10	(Note: For the Bantamweight Champion.)
Lightweight	Takanori Gomi	def.	Dokonjonosuke Mishima	TKO (Punches)	2	0:52	Shooto: Year End Show 2002	(Note: For the Lightweight Champion.)
Featherweight	Alexandre Franca Nogueira (c)	def.	Hiroyuki Abe	Submission (Rear-Naked Choke)	1	3:53	Shooto: Year End Show 2002	(Note: For the Featherweight Champion.)

== Events list ==
#	Event Title	Date	Arena	Location
124	Shooto: Year End Show 2002	December 14, 2002	Tokyo Bay NK Hall	Urayasu, Chiba, Japan
123	Shooto: Treasure Hunt 11	November 15, 2002	Korakuen Hall	Tokyo, Japan
122	Shooto: Gig West 3	October 27, 2002	Namba Grand Kagetsu Studio	Osaka, Kansai, Japan
121	Shooto: Gig Central 2	October 6, 2002	Nagoya Civic Assembly Hall	Nagoya, Aichi, Japan
120	Shooto: Gig East 11	September 25, 2002	Kitazawa Town Hall	Tokyo, Japan
119	Shooto: Treasure Hunt 10	September 16, 2002	Yokohama Cultural Gymnasium	Yokohama, Kanagawa, Japan
118	Shooto: Gig East 10	August 27, 2002	Kitazawa Town Hall	Tokyo, Japan
117	Shooto: Treasure Hunt 9	July 27, 2002	Kitazawa Town Hall	Setagaya, Tokyo, Japan
116	Shooto: Treasure Hunt 8	July 19, 2002	Korakuen Hall	Tokyo, Japan
115	Shooto: Treasure Hunt 7	June 29, 2002	Kanaoka Park Gymnasium	Sakai, Osaka, Japan
114	Shooto: Gig East 9	May 28, 2002	Kitazawa Town Hall	Tokyo, Japan
113	Shooto: Treasure Hunt 6	May 5, 2002	Korakuen Hall	Tokyo, Japan
112	Shooto: Wanna Shooto Japan	April 21, 2002	Kitazawa Town Hall	Setagaya, Tokyo, Japan
111	Shooto: Wanna Shooto 2002	April 14, 2002	Kitazawa Town Hall	Setagaya, Tokyo, Japan
110	Shooto: Gig Central 1	March 31, 2002	Nagoya Civic Assembly Hall	Nagoya, Aichi, Japan
109	Shooto: Treasure Hunt 5	March 15, 2002	Korakuen Hall	Tokyo, Japan
108	Shooto: Treasure Hunt 4	March 13, 2002	Kitazawa Town Hall	Setagaya, Tokyo, Japan
107	Shooto: Gig East 8	February 28, 2002	Kitazawa Town Hall	Tokyo, Japan
106	Shooto: Treasure Hunt 3	February 11, 2002	Kobe Fashion Mart	Kobe, Hyogo, Japan
105	Shooto: Treasure Hunt 2	January 25, 2002	Kitazawa Town Hall	Setagaya, Tokyo, Japan
104	Shooto: Treasure Hunt 1	January 12, 2002	Korakuen Hall	Tokyo, Japan

== Shooto: Treasure Hunt 1 ==
Shooto: Treasure Hunt 1 was an event held on January 12, 2002, at Korakuen Hall in Tokyo, Japan.

=== Results ===
Main Card
Weight class				Method	Round	Time	Notes
Middleweight	Masanori Suda	def.	Lance Gibson	Decision (Unanimous)	3	5:00	(Note: For The Middleweight Champion.)
	Hisao Ikeda	def.	Hiroaki Yoshioka	Decision (Unanimous)	3	5:00
	Izuru Takeuchi	def.	Ronald Jhun	Decision (Majority)	3	5:00
	Ryota Matsune	def.	Daiji Takahashi	Decision (Unanimous)	2	5:00
	Takeyasu Hirono	def.	Tomohiro Hashi	Decision (Majority)	2	5:00
	Mitsuhiro Ishida	def.	Masakazu Kuramochi	Decision (Unanimous)	2	5:00

== Shooto: Treasure Hunt 2 ==
Shooto: Treasure Hunt 2 was an event held on January 25, 2002, at Kitazawa Town Hall in Setagaya, Tokyo, Japan.

=== Results ===
Main Card
Weight class				Method	Round	Time	Notes
	Kohei Yasumi	def.	Henry Matamoros	Decision (Unanimous)	3	5:00
	Takayuki Okochi	def.	Mitsuo Matsumoto	Decision (Unanimous)	2	5:00
	Junji Ikoma	def.	Toshiteru Ishii	Technical Submission (Kimura)	1	2:35
	Kotetsu Boku	def.	Takuhito Hida	Decision (Unanimous)	2	5:00
	Akitoshi Tamura	vs.	Jin Kazeta	Draw	2	5:00
	Masatoshi Abe	def.	Katsuhisa Akasaki	Decision (Unanimous)	2	5:00
	Akira Kikuchi	def.	Yoichi Fukumoto	Submission (Armbar)	1	3:18

== Shooto: Treasure Hunt 3 ==
Shooto: Treasure Hunt 3 was an event held on February 11, 2002, at Kobe Fashion Mart in Kobe, Hyogo, Japan.

=== Results ===
Main Card
Weight class				Method	Round	Time	Notes
	Dokonjonosuke Mishima	def.	Ben Thomas	TKO (Punches)	1	3:07
	Takuya Wada	def.	Seichi Ikemoto	Decision (Unanimous)	3	5:00
	Masaya Inoue	def.	Kaichi Tsuji	Decision (Unanimous)	2	5:00
	Tsutomu Shiiki	vs.	Naoki Matsushita	Draw	2	5:00
	Yasuyuki Tokuoka	def.	Hirofumi Hara	Decision (Unanimous)	2	5:00
	Masashi Kameda	def.	Masanori Sugatani	Submission (Armbar)	1	4:34
	Akira Kibe	vs.	Akitoshi Hokazono	Draw	2	5:00

== Shooto: Gig East 8 ==
Shooto: Gig East 8 was an event held on February 28, 2002, at Kitazawa Town Hall in Tokyo, Japan.

=== Results ===
Main Card
Weight class				Method	Round	Time	Notes
	Takaharu Murahama	def.	Yohei Suzuki	Decision (Unanimous)	2	5:00
	Ken Omatsu	def.	Takashi Ochi	TKO (Punches)	1	3:02
	Hiroshi Komatsu	def.	Eiji Murayama	Decision (Unanimous)	2	5:00
	Hiroki Kotani	vs.	Seiki Uchimura	Draw	2	5:00
	Ikuma Hoshino	def.	Yoshiko Onoue	TKO (Corner Stoppage)	2	4:38

== Shooto: Treasure Hunt 4 ==
Shooto: Treasure Hunt 4 was an event held on March 13, 2002, at Kitazawa Town Hall in Setagaya, Tokyo, Japan.

=== Results ===
Main Card
Weight class				Method	Round	Time	Notes
	Ryuta Sakurai	vs.	Marcelo Machado	Draw	2	5:00
	Homare Kuboyama	def.	Takeyasu Hirono	Decision (Split)	2	5:00
	Yasuhiro Urushitani	def.	Masaru Gokita	Decision (Unanimous)	2	5:00
	Kotetsu Boku	def.	Mitsuo Matsumoto	Decision (Unanimous)	2	5:00
	Tatsuya Kawajiri	def.	Masaya Takita	TKO (Swollen Eye)	2	1:22
	Kuniyoshi Hironaka	def.	Toru Nakayama	Submission (Triangle Choke)	1	3:10

== Shooto: Treasure Hunt 5 ==
Shooto: Treasure Hunt 5 was an event held on March 15, 2002, at Korakuen Hall in Tokyo, Japan.

=== Results ===
Main Card
Weight class				Method	Round	Time	Notes
	Ryan Bow	def.	Marcio Ramos Barbosa	Decision (Unanimous)	3	5:00
	Hiroyuki Abe	vs.	Baret Yoshida	Draw	3	5:00
	Shiko Yamashita	def.	Jun Kitagawa	Decision (Majority)	2	5:00
	Makoto Ishikawa	def.	Yohei Nanbu	Decision (Majority)	2	5:00
	Tomohiro Hashi	def.	Shinichi Hanawa	Decision (Majority)	2	5:00
	Noriyuki Yokoyama	def.	Seiji Ozuka	Decision (Unanimous)	2	5:00

== Shooto: Gig Central 1 ==
Shooto: Gig Central 1 was an event held on March 31, 2002, at Nagoya Civic Assembly Hall in Nagoya, Aichi, Japan.

=== Results ===
Main Card
Weight class				Method	Round	Time	Notes
	Naoya Uematsu	vs.	Kazuhiro Inoue	Draw	3	5:00
	Kohei Yasumi	def.	Daisuke Sugie	Submission (Guillotine Choke)	1	3:31
	Naoki Matsushita	def.	Takayuki Okochi	Decision (Majority)	2	5:00
	Yasuhiro Akagi	def.	Takahisa Toyoshima	Submission (Armbar)	1	2:00
	Masatoshi Abe	def.	Keisuke Kurata	Submission (Rear Naked Choke)	1	4:39

== Shooto: Wanna Shooto 2002 ==
Shooto: Wanna Shooto 2002 was an event held on April 14, 2002, at Kitazawa Town Hall in Setagaya, Tokyo, Japan.

=== Results ===
Main Card
Weight class				Method	Round	Time	Notes
	Mamoru Yamaguchi	def.	Hiroaki Yoshioka	Decision (Unanimous)	3	5:00
	Yohei Suzuki	def.	Patrick Rahael	TKO (Punches)	1	3:20
	Isao Tanimura	def.	Mario Stapel	Decision (Unanimous)	2	5:00
	Toru Nakayama	def.	Yoshifumi Dogaki	Decision (Unanimous)	2	5:00
	Kentaro Imaizumi	vs.	Shuichiro Katsumura	Draw	2	5:00
	Marloes Coenen	def.	Miwako Ishihara	Decision (Majority)	2	5:00
	Masato Fujiwara	def.	Vincent Latoel	Submission (Triangle/Armbar)	1	3:53
	Akira Kikuchi	def.	Jani Lax	Submission (Kimura)	1	2:51
	Kenichiro Togashi	vs.	Seiki Uchimura	Draw	2	5:00

== Shooto: Wanna Shooto Japan ==
Shooto: Wanna Shooto Japan was an event held on April 21, 2002, at Kitazawa Town Hall in Setagaya, Tokyo, Japan.

=== Results ===
Main Card
Weight class				Method	Round	Time	Notes
	Tatsuya Kawajiri	def.	Takeshi Yamazaki	Decision (Unanimous)	2	5:00
	Masato Shiozawa	def.	Akira Kibe	Decision (Unanimous)	2	5:00
	Hideki Kadowaki	def.	Naoya Miyamoto	Submission (Rear-Naked Choke)	1	2:12
	Tsutomu Shiiki	def.	Naosuke Mizoguchi	KO (Punch)	2	0:53
	Jin Kazeta	def.	Masanori Sugatani	KO (Knee to the Body)	1	1:11
	Shinichi Hanawa	def.	Katsuhisa Akasaki	DQ (Knee to the Head on the Ground)	1	4:00
	Hiroki Kita	def.	Manabu Kano	Decision (Unanimous)	2	5:00

== Shooto: Treasure Hunt 6 ==
Shooto: Treasure Hunt 6 was an event held on May 5, 2002, at Korakuen Hall in Tokyo, Japan.

=== Results ===
Main Card
Weight class				Method	Round	Time	Notes
	Stephen Palling	def.	Norifumi Yamamoto	TKO (Cut)	1	0:30
	Jin Akimoto	def.	Alfonso Alcarez	Submission (Kneebar)	1	0:22
	Dave Strasser	def.	Takuya Wada	Decision (Split)	3	5:00
	Takaharu Murahama	def.	Kotetsu Boku	Submission (Kneebar)	2	3:17
	Kenichiro Togashi	def.	Masakazu Kuramochi	Submission (Armbar)	1	4:31
	Yoichi Fukumoto	def.	Shinobu Ito	Decision (Unanimous)	2	5:00
	Yasuhiro Urushitani	def.	Yasuhiro Akagi	Technical Submission (Triangle/Kimura)	2	1:57

== Shooto: Gig East 9 ==
Shooto: Gig East 9 was an event held on May 28, 2002, at Kitazawa Town Hall in Tokyo, Japan.

=== Results ===
Main Card
Weight class				Method	Round	Time	Notes
	Kazuya Abe	def.	Matt Hamilton	Submission (Armbar)	1	3:56
	Tatsuya Kawajiri	def.	Daisuke Sugie	TKO (Punches)	2	4:19
	Hirofumi Hara	def.	Kuniyoshi Hironaka	TKO (Punches)	1	4:34
	Jin Kazeta	def.	Hiroshi Komatsu	Decision (Unanimous)	2	5:00
	Akira Kibe	def.	Noriyuki Yokoyama	Decision (Majority)	2	5:00
	Ken Omatsu	def.	Takuhito Hida	Decision (Unanimous)	2	5:00
	Masaya Inoue	def.	Akihiko Adachi	Decision (Unanimous)	2	5:00
	Yuichi Nakanishi	def.	Tomoki Kanuka	Decision (Unanimous)	2	5:00

== Shooto: Treasure Hunt 7 ==
Shooto: Treasure Hunt 7 was an event held on June 29, 2002, at The Kanaoka Park Gymnasium in Sakai, Osaka, Japan.

=== Results ===
Main Card
Weight class				Method	Round	Time	Notes
	Takanori Gomi	def.	Leonardo Santos	Decision (Majority)	3	5:00
	Masanori Suda	def.	Ronald Jhun	Decision (Majority)	3	5:00
	Dokonjonosuke Mishima	def.	Iran Mascarenhas	Submission (Achilles Lock)	2	4:53
	Javier Vazquez	def.	Rumina Sato	Decision (Unanimous)	3	5:00
	Dave Strasser	def.	Seichi Ikemoto	Submission (Rear Naked Choke)	1	3:10
	Yasuyuki Tokuoka	def.	Yoichi Fukumoto	Decision (Unanimous)	2	5:00
	Kaichi Tsuji	def.	Masato Nishiguchi	Decision (Unanimous)	2	5:00

== Shooto: Treasure Hunt 8 ==
Shooto: Treasure Hunt 8 was an event held on July 19, 2002, at Korakuen Hall in Tokyo, Japan.

=== Results ===
Main Card
Weight class				Method	Round	Time	Notes
	Hiroyuki Abe	def.	Alexandre Franca Nogueira	KO (Punch)	1	4:37
	Kazuhiro Inoue	vs.	Tetsuo Katsuta	Draw	3	5:00
	Homare Kuboyama	def.	Takeyasu Hirono	Decision (Unanimous)	3	5:00
	Kotetsu Boku	def.	Toniko Junior	TKO (Punches)	1	4:50
	Tatsuya Kawajiri	def.	Tsutomu Shiiki	Submission (Rear-Naked Choke)	1	4:42
	Masatoshi Abe	def.	Junji Ikoma	Decision (Majority)	2	5:00
	Masato Shiozawa	def.	Daiji Takahashi	Decision (Unanimous)	2	5:00
	Kenichiro Togashi	vs.	Eduardo Guimaraes	Draw	2	5:00

== Shooto: Treasure Hunt 9 ==
Shooto: Treasure Hunt 9 was an event held on July 27, 2002, at The Kitazawa Town Hall in Setagaya, Tokyo, Japan.

=== Results ===
Main Card
Weight class				Method	Round	Time	Notes
	Hiroaki Yoshioka	def.	Ichaku Murata	Decision (Unanimous)	3	5:00
	Akira Kikuchi	def.	Shigetoshi Iwase	Decision (Unanimous)	2	5:00
	Yohei Suzuki	def.	Ken Omatsu	Decision (Unanimous)	2	5:00
	Hideki Kadowaki	def.	Masashi Kameda	Submission (Rear-Naked Choke)	1	2:23
	Akira Komatsu	def.	Hiroki Kita	Decision (Unanimous)	2	5:00
	Takayuki Okochi	def.	Hiroki Kotani	KO (Knee)	1	2:06
	Toshiteru Ishii	def.	Takahisa Toyoshima	Decision (Majority)	2	5:00
	Eiji Murayama	def.	Masatoshi Kobayashi	Decision (Unanimous)	2	5:00

== Shooto: Gig East 10 ==
Shooto: Gig East 10 was an event held on August 27, 2002, at Kitazawa Town Hall in Tokyo, Japan.

=== Results ===
Main Card
Weight class				Method	Round	Time	Notes
	Takumi Nakayama	def.	Takeshi Yamazaki	Decision (Unanimous)	3	5:00
	Masato Fujiwara	vs.	Naoki Matsushita	Draw	2	5:00
	Yasuhiro Urushitani	def.	Tomohiro Hashi	Decision (Majority)	2	5:00
	Masato Nishiguchi	vs.	Ryuta Sakurai	Draw	2	5:00
	Kuniyoshi Hironaka	def.	Yuji Kusu	TKO (Swollen Eye)	2	3:47
	Hiroshi Komatsu	def.	Akitoshi Tamura	Technical Decision (Unanimous)	2	0:33
	Komei Okada	def.	Shinobu Ito	Decision (Split)	2	5:00
	Seiji Nakasugi	def.	Tomonori Tachiyama	Decision	2	5:00
	Hiromi Oka	vs.	Aya Sakurai	Draw	2	3:00

== Shooto: Treasure Hunt 10 ==
Shooto: Treasure Hunt 10 was an event held on September 16, 2002, at The Yokohama Cultural Gymnasium in Yokohama, Kanagawa, Japan.

=== Results ===
Main Card
Weight class				Method	Round	Time	Notes
Bantamweight	Masahiro Oishi (c)	vs.	Hisao Ikeda	Draw	3	5:00	(Note: For The Bantamweight Champion.)
	Takanori Gomi	def.	Chris Brennan	Decision (Unanimous)	3	5:00
	Norifumi Yamamoto	def.	Tetsuo Katsuta	TKO (Punches)	1	2:45
	Vítor Ribeiro	def.	Hiroshi Tsuruya	Decision (Unanimous)	3	5:00
	Robson Moura	def.	Mamoru Yamaguchi	Decision (Unanimous)	3	5:00
	Kentaro Imaizumi	def.	Kazuya Abe	TKO (Corner Stoppage)	1	2:06
	Bao Quach	def.	Naoya Uematsu	Decision (Unanimous)	2	5:00
	Makoto Ishikawa	def.	Eiji Murayama	Decision (Unanimous)	2	5:00

== Shooto: Gig East 11 ==
Shooto: Gig East 11 was an event held on September 25, 2002, at Kitazawa Town Hall in Tokyo, Japan.

=== Results ===
Main Card
Weight class				Method	Round	Time	Notes
	Ryota Matsune	def.	Ichaku Murata	Decision (Unanimous)	3	5:00
	Takayuki Okochi	def.	Masato Fujiwara	TKO (Punches)	2	4:24
	Jin Kazeta	vs.	Naosuke Mizoguchi	Draw	2	5:00
	Fumio Usami	vs.	Naoto Kojima	Draw	2	5:00
	Yohei Mikami	def.	Noriyuki Yokoyama	KO (Punch)	1	0:26
	Takashi Nakakura	def.	Heima Hashimoto	Submission (Rear Naked Choke)	2	3:17

== Shooto: Gig Central 2 ==
Shooto: Gig Central 2 was an event held on October 6, 2002, at The Nagoya Civic Assembly Hall in Nagoya, Aichi, Japan.

=== Results ===
Main Card
Weight class				Method	Round	Time	Notes
	Kimihito Nonaka	def.	Hiroaki Yoshioka	Decision (Unanimous)	3	5:00
	Naoki Matsushita	def.	Yohei Suzuki	Decision (Unanimous)	2	5:00
	Akira Komatsu	def.	Akira Kibe	Decision (Majority)	2	5:00
	Junji Ikoma	def.	Yasuhiro Akagi	Submission (Rear-Naked Choke)	1	4:41
	Keisuke Kurata	def.	Kenichi Sawada	Decision (Unanimous)	2	5:00
	Hatsu Hioki	def.	Masanori Sugatani	Submission (Rear-Naked Choke)	1	2:29

== Shooto: Gig West 3 ==
Shooto: Gig West 3 was an event held on October 27, 2002, at The Namba Grand Kagetsu Studio in Osaka, Japan.

=== Results ===
Main Card
Weight class				Method	Round	Time	Notes
	Tatsuya Kawajiri	def.	Ken Omatsu	Submission (Armbar)	1	4:40
	Seichi Ikemoto	def.	Shigetoshi Iwase	Decision (Majority)	2	5:00
	Ryuta Sakurai	def.	Jun Kitagawa	TKO (Cut)	1	3:23
	Takashi Nakakura	def.	Masaya Takita	Decision (Unanimous)	2	5:00
	Hiroyuki Tanaka	def.	Manabu Kano	Decision (Unanimous)	2	5:00

== Shooto: Treasure Hunt 11 ==
Shooto: Treasure Hunt 11 was an event held on November 15, 2002, at Korakuen Hall in Tokyo, Japan.

=== Results ===
Main Card
Weight class				Method	Round	Time	Notes
	Rumina Sato	vs.	Takumi Nakayama	Draw	3	5:00
	Shuichiro Katsumura	def.	Alfonso Alcarez	Technical Submission (Triangle Choke)	2	3:04
	Kuniyoshi Hironaka	def.	Yasuyuki Tokuoka	Decision (Unanimous)	2	5:00
	Hideki Kadowaki	def.	Hiroshi Komatsu	Decision (Unanimous)	2	5:00
	Yasuhiro Urushitani	def.	Masatoshi Abe	Decision (Unanimous)	2	5:00
	Yoichi Fukumoto	def.	Rhett Anthony	Submission (Kimura)	2	2:11
	Hatsu Hioki	def.	Edward Button	TKO (Punches)	1	4:11
	Komei Okada	def.	Kentaro Maeda	TKO (Knee Injury)	2	0:15
	Tomonari Kanomata	vs.	Nobuhiro Obiya	Draw	2	5:00

== Shooto: Year End Show 2002 ==
Shooto: Year End Show 2002 was an event held on December 14, 2002, at The Tokyo Bay NK Hall in Urayasu, Chiba, Japan.

=== Results ===
Main Card
Weight class				Method	Round	Time	Notes
Lightweight	Takanori Gomi	def.	Dokonjonosuke Mishima	TKO (Punches)	2	0:52	(Note: For The Lightweight Champion.)
Featherweight	Alexandre Franca Nogueira (c)	def.	Hiroyuki Abe	Submission (Rear-Naked Choke)	1	3:53	(Note: For The Featherweight Champion.)
	Jake Shields	def.	Hayato Sakurai	Decision (Unanimous)	3	5:00
	Vítor Ribeiro	def.	Tatsuya Kawajiri	Decision (Unanimous)	3	5:00
	Masato Shiozawa	def.	Hisao Ikeda	TKO (Punches)	3	4:14
	Joachim Hansen	def.	Takumi Nakayama	Decision (Majority)	3	5:00
	Kuniyoshi Hironaka	def.	Nick Diaz	Decision (Split)	3	5:00

== See also ==
- Shooto
- List of Shooto champions
- List of Shooto Events
