= Daiji Takahashi =

Japanese mixed martial artist

- Born: March 9, 1977 (age 49); Japan
- Nationality: Japanese
- Height: 5 ft 6 in (1.68 m)
- Weight: 123 lb (56 kg; 8.8 st)
- Division: Flyweight; Bantamweight
- Team: Freelance
- Years active: 1999 - 2011

Mixed martial arts record
- Total: 23
- Wins: 8
- By submission: 1
- By decision: 7
- Losses: 11
- By knockout: 1
- By submission: 1
- By decision: 9
- Draws: 4

Other information
- Mixed martial arts record from Sherdog

Daiji Takahashi (born March 9, 1977) is a Japanese mixed martial artist. He competed in the Flyweight and Bantamweight division.

== Mixed martial arts record ==
Professional record breakdown
23 matches	8 wins	11 losses
By knockout	0	1
By submission	1	1
By decision	7	9
Draws	4	

Res.	Record	Opponent	Method	Event	Date	Round	Time	Location	Notes
Loss	8-11-4	Shinichi Hanawa	KO (punches)	Shooto: Shooting Disco 16: Regeneration	October 1, 2011	2	2:10	Tokyo, Japan	
Win	8-10-4	Yusei Shimokawa	Decision (unanimous)	Shooto: Gig Tokyo 5	August 7, 2010	3	5:00	Tokyo, Japan	
Win	7-10-4	Takuya Mori	Decision (majority)	Shooto: Gig North 4	June 7, 2009	3	5:00	Sapporo, Hokkaido, Japan	
Draw	6-10-4	Masaaki Sugawara	Draw	Shooto: Shooto Tradition 6	March 20, 2009	3	5:00	Tokyo, Japan	
Draw	6-10-3	Seiji Ozuka	Draw	Shooto: Shooting Disco 6: Glory Shines In You	October 5, 2008	2	5:00	Tokyo, Japan	
Loss	6-10-2	Yasuhiro Urushitani	Decision (unanimous)	Shooto 2006: 9/8 in Korakuen Hall	September 8, 2006	3	5:00	Tokyo, Japan	
Loss	6-9-2	Junji Ikoma	Submission (triangle choke)	Shooto: 3/24 in Korakuen Hall	March 24, 2006	3	3:50	Tokyo, Japan	
Loss	6-8-2	Mamoru Yamaguchi	Decision (unanimous)	Shooto: 12/17 in Shinjuku FACE	December 17, 2005	3	5:00	Tokyo, Japan	
Loss	6-7-2	Shinichi Kojima	Decision (unanimous)	Shooto: 1/29 in Korakuen Hall	January 29, 2005	2	5:00	Tokyo, Japan	
Win	6-6-2	Hiroyasu Kodera	Decision (unanimous)	Shooto: Wanna Shooto 2004	November 12, 2004	2	5:00	Tokyo, Japan	
Win	5-6-2	Tomohiro Hashi	Decision (unanimous)	Shooto: 3/4 in Kitazawa Town Hall	March 4, 2004	2	5:00	Setagaya, Tokyo, Japan	
Loss	4-6-2	Masatoshi Abe	Decision (unanimous)	Shooto: 8/10 in Yokohama Cultural Gymnasium	August 10, 2003	2	5:00	Yokohama, Kanagawa, Japan	
Win	4-5-2	Toshiteru Ishii	Decision (unanimous)	Shooto: 2/6 in Kitazawa Town Hall	February 6, 2003	2	5:00	Setagaya, Tokyo, Japan	
Loss	3-5-2	Masato Shiozawa	Decision (unanimous)	Shooto: Treasure Hunt 8	July 19, 2002	2	5:00	Tokyo, Japan	
Loss	3-4-2	Ryota Matsune	Decision (unanimous)	Shooto: Treasure Hunt 1	January 12, 2002	2	5:00	Tokyo, Japan	
Loss	3-3-2	Ryota Matsune	Decision (majority)	Shooto: Gig East 6	October 23, 2001	2	5:00	Tokyo, Japan	
Win	3-2-2	Hiroshi Umemura	Submission (rear-naked choke)	Shooto: Gig East 2	May 22, 2001	2	3:51	Tokyo, Japan	
Loss	2-2-2	Kentaro Imaizumi	Decision (unanimous)	Shooto: Wanna Shooto 2001	April 8, 2001	2	5:00	Setagaya, Tokyo, Japan	
Win	2-1-2	Yasuhiro Urushitani	Decision (unanimous)	Shooto: To The Top 1	January 19, 2001	2	5:00	Tokyo, Japan	
Draw	1-1-2	Hiroki Kita	Draw	Shooto: R.E.A.D. 11	October 9, 2000	2	5:00	Setagaya, Tokyo, Japan	
Win	1-1-1	Takeyasu Hirono	Decision (majority)	Shooto: R.E.A.D. 7	July 22, 2000	2	5:00	Setagaya, Tokyo, Japan	
Loss	0-1-1	Hiroaki Yoshioka	Decision (split)	Shooto: R.E.A.D. 4	April 12, 2000	2	5:00	Setagaya, Tokyo, Japan	
Draw	0-0-1	Masaki Nishizawa	Draw	Shooto: Gateway to the Extremes	November 4, 1999	2	5:00	Setagaya, Tokyo, Japan	

== See also ==
- List of male mixed martial artists
