= Yokohama Port Symbol Tower =

Coordinates: 35°26′21″N 139°41′23″E

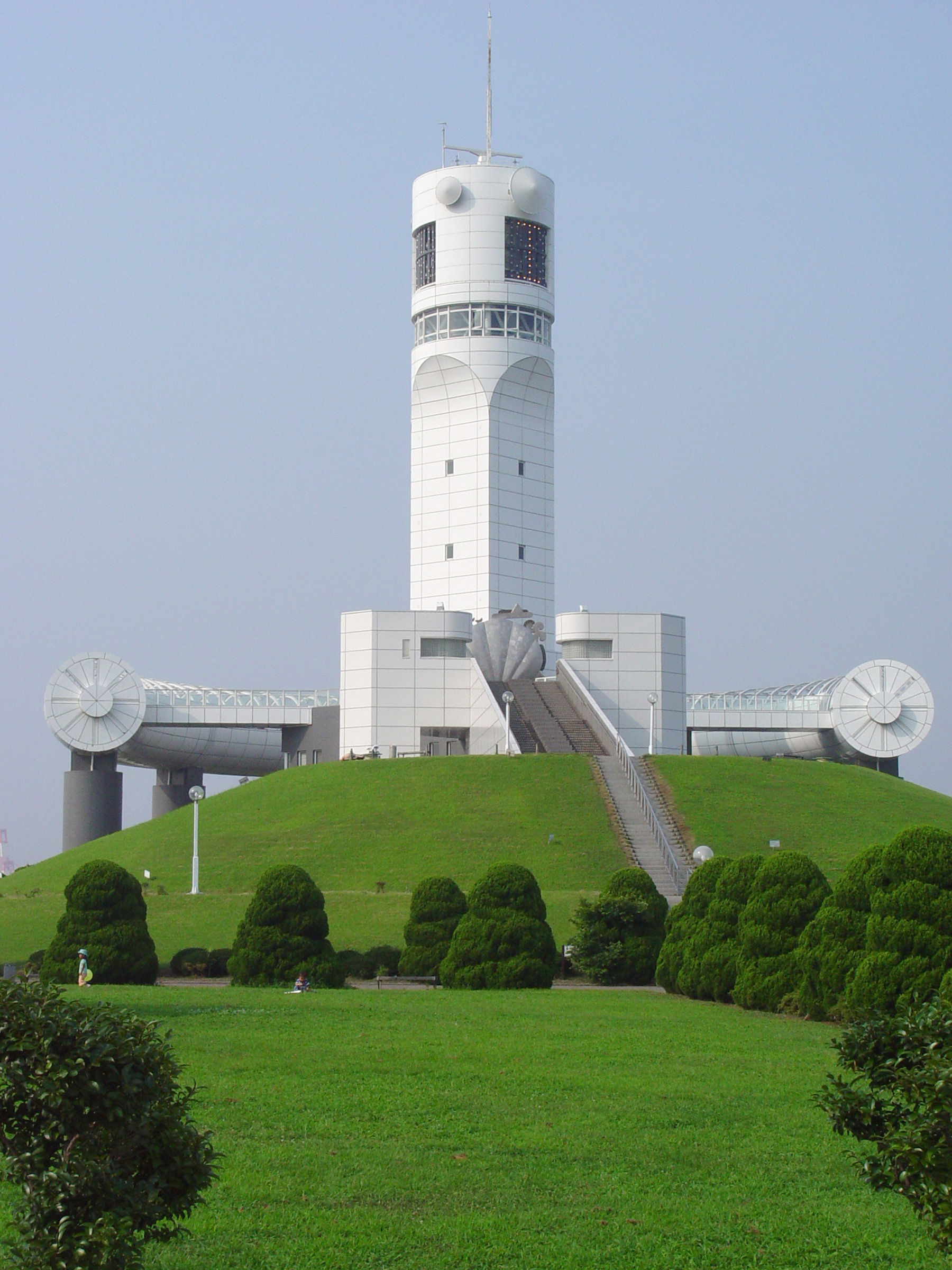
- Yokohama Port Symbol Tower

The Yokohama Port Symbol Tower (横浜港シンボルタワー, Yokohama-kō Shimboru Tawā) is a tower in Yokohama, Kanagawa Prefecture, Japan. Construction of the 48-metre tower was finished in 1986. It is a tower with a free observation deck at the top.
