= Muscat Stadium =

Baseball stadium in Kurashiki, Okayama, Japan

Coordinates: 34°37′14″N 133°48′14″E

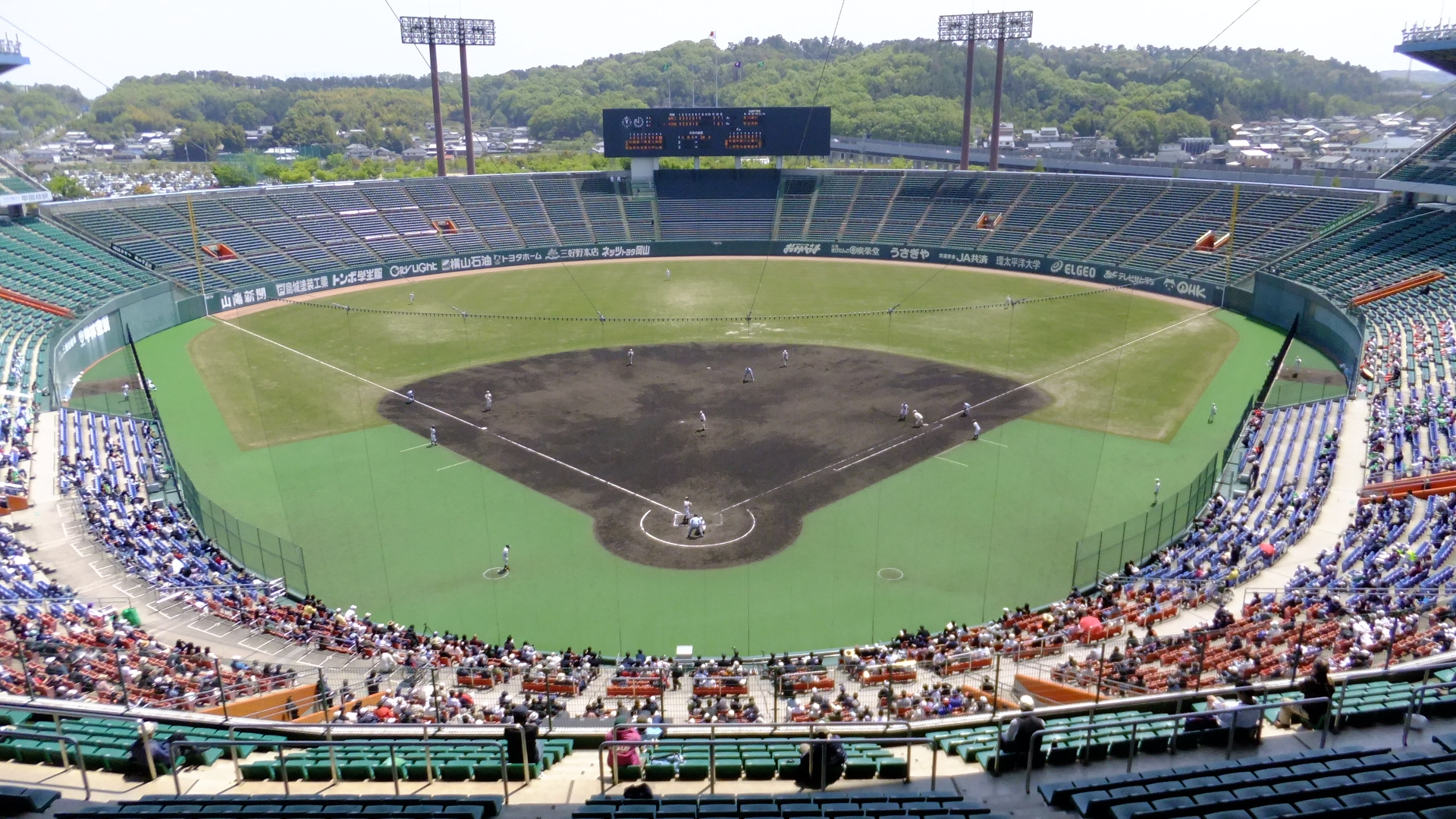
Muscat Stadium in April 2009

Muscat Stadium (マスカットスタジアム, Masukatto Sutajiamu) is a baseball stadium located in Kurashiki Sports Park, Kurashiki, Okayama Prefecture, Japan.

Nicknamed Kurashiki Muscat Stadium, it opened in 1995 and has a capacity of 30,494. It is an all-seater. Renovations of the stadium began in 2025.

The facility is owned by Okayama Prefecture and operated and managed by the Kurashiki Sports Park Public Interest Incorporated Foundation, an affiliated organization of the prefecture.
