= Okuyama =

Okuyama (written: 奥山) is a Japanese surname. Notable people with the surname include:

- Emiko Okuyama (born 1951), Japanese politician
- Hisashi Okuyama (born 1941), Japanese poet
- Kazusa Okuyama (奥山 かずさ, born 1994), Japanese model
- Keiji Okuyama (奥山 恵二, born 1968), Japanese sport wrestler
- Ken Okuyama (born 1959), Japanese industrial designer
- Masayuki Okuyama (奧山 政幸, born 1993), Japanese footballer
- Musashi Okuyama (奥山 武宰士, born 1991), Japanese footballer
- Reiko Okuyama (奥山 玲子, died 2007), Japanese animator
- Takemasa Okuyama (born 1944), Canadian karateka
- Tatsuyuki Okuyama (奥山 達之, born 1976), Japanese footballer
- Yasuhiro Okuyama (奥山 泰裕, born 1985), Japanese footballer
