= Takamatsu Symbol Tower =

Coordinates: 34°21′08.5″N 134°02′48.5″E

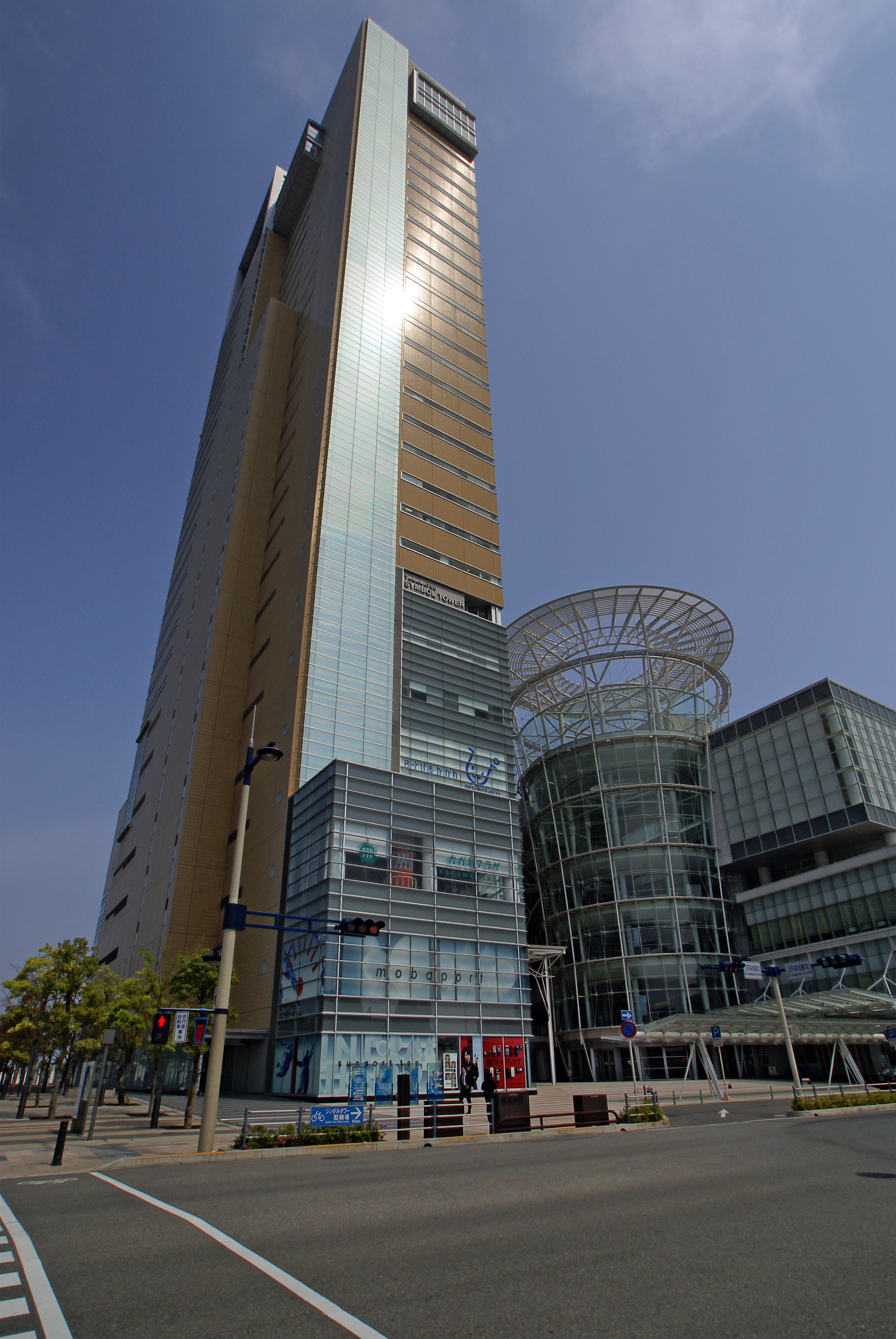
- Symbol Tower

Map

The Takamatsu Symbol Tower (高松シンボルタワー, Takamatsu Shimboru Tawā) is a skyscraper located in Takamatsu, Kagawa Prefecture, Japan. Construction of the 151-metre, 30-story skyscraper was finished in 2001.
