= Hideki Kadowaki =

Japanese mixed martial arts fighter

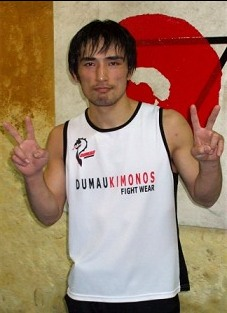
- Born: 28 May 1976 (age 50); Ichihara, Chiba Prefecture, Japan
- Nationality: Japanese
- Height: 5 ft 9 in (1.75 m)
- Weight: 144 lb (65 kg; 10.3 st)
- Division: Featherweight
- Fighting out of: Tokyo, Japan
- Team: Wajyutsu Keisyukai
- Years active: 2000-present

Mixed martial arts record
- Total: 36
- Wins: 16
- By submission: 7
- By decision: 9
- Losses: 17
- By knockout: 5
- By submission: 4
- By decision: 8
- Draws: 3

Other information
- Mixed martial arts record from Sherdog

Hideki Kadowaki (門脇英基, Kadowaki Hideki) (born 28 May 1976) is a Japanese mixed martial artist. A professional competitor since 2000, he has competed for Shooto, DEEP, and World Victory Road. He is the former Shooto Lightweight (143 lbs) Champion.

== Biography ==
Hideki Kadowaki was born in Ichihara, Chiba Prefecture. He started MMA 11 years ago. He started out just goofing around with friends, and then thought it would be fun to do fighting as a job. After deciding to become a professional fighter, he joined Wajyutsu Keisyukai in Nagasaki, where the former headquarters was located. He worked various part-time jobs to support himself, and trained there for two years, after which he moved to Tokyo where there were more competitions and fight opportunities.

Currently, he trains and fights out of Wajyutsu Keisyukai Tokyo HQ, and teaches classes at Marupuro Gym once or twice a week.

His strength is in grappling, but over time he developed a good striking game, training with other Keishukai pros such as strikers Kenji Osawa, Hayate Usui, and many others. His namesake is called the Kadowaki special, which is a modified rear naked choke which is applied from the back crucifix position instead of the standard back mount.

His favorite saying is, "Just enjoy life!"

He became Shooto 65 kg champion on March 28, 2008 by defeating Akitoshi Tamura by majority decision.

== Championships and accomplishments ==
- Shooto
  - Shooto Lightweight Championship (One time)
  - 2002 Shooto Lightweight Rookie Champion
  - 2000 All Japan Amateur Shooto Welterweight Runner Up

== Mixed martial arts record ==
Professional record breakdown
36 matches	16 wins	17 losses
By knockout	0	5
By submission	7	4
By decision	9	8
Draws	3	

Res.	Record	Opponent	Method	Event	Date	Round	Time	Location	Notes
Loss	16–17–3	Satoshi Inaba	Decision (majority)	Grandslam 7: Way of the Cage	March 25, 2018	2	5:00	Tokyo, Japan	
Loss	16–16–3	Yusuke Kawango	Decision (unanimous)	Tribe Tokyo Fight: TTF Challenge 07	October 9, 2017	3	5:00	Tokyo, Japan	
Win	16–15–3	Yuki Ohara	Decision (unanimous)	DEEP: Cage Impact 2016 in Korakuen Hall	October 18, 2016	2	5:00	Tokyo, Japan	
Win	15–15–3	Satoshi Nishino	Submission	Grachan 14: Mach Matsuri	July 20, 2014	1	3:18	Tokyo, Japan	
Loss	14–15–3	Kleber Koike Erbst	Submission (rear-naked choke)	DEEP: Cage Impact 2013	November 24, 2013	1	4:21	Tokyo, Japan	
Loss	14–14–3	Hiroshige Tanaka	KO (punch)	Shooto: 2nd Round 2013	March 16, 2013	1	0:49	Tokyo, Japan	
Loss	14–13–3	Tatsunao Nagakura	TKO (punches)	DEEP: 58 Impact	June 15, 2012	1	3:35	Tokyo, Japan	
Loss	14–12–3	Kazunori Yokota	Decision (unanimous)	DEEP: 57 Impact	February 18, 2012	3	5:00	Tokyo, Japan	For DEEP Featherweight Championship.
Draw	14–11–3	Kosuke Kindaichi	Draw	Shooto: Gig Saitama 3	April 10, 2011	2	5:00	Saitama, Japan	
Win	14–11–2	Yusuke Yachi	Decision (unanimous)	Shooto: The Rookie Tournament 2010 Final	December 18, 2010	2	5:00	Tokyo, Japan	
Loss	13–11–2	Gustavo Falciroli	KO (punches)	Shooto Australia: Superfight Australia 8	June 11, 2010	1	1:53	Joondalup, Australia	
Loss	13–10–2	Taiki Tsuchiya	Decision (unanimous)	Shooto: The Way of Shooto 1: Like a Tiger, Like a Dragon	January 23, 2010	3	5:00	Tokyo, Japan	
Loss	13–9–2	Nam Phan	TKO (punches)	World Victory Road Presents: Sengoku 7	March 20, 2009	1	3:09	Tokyo, Japan	
Loss	13–8–2	Takeshi Inoue	Decision (unanimous)	Shooto: Shooto Tradition 4	November 29, 2008	3	5:00	Tokyo, Japan	Lost Shooto Lightweight (143 lbs) Championship.
Win	13–7–2	Akitoshi Tamura	Decision (majority)	Shooto: Back To Our Roots 8	March 28, 2008	3	5:00	Tokyo, Japan	Won Shooto Lightweight (143 lbs) Championship.
Win	12–7–2	Rumina Sato	Submission (rear naked choke)	Shooto: Back to Our Roots 5	September 22, 2007	1	4:09	Tokyo, Japan	
Loss	11–7–2	Akiyo Nishiura	Decision (split)	Shooto: Back to Our Roots 2	March 16, 2007	3	5:00	Tokyo, Japan	
Win	11–6–2	Daisuke Ishizawa	Decision (unanimous)	Shooto: 11/30 in Kitazawa Town Hall	November 30, 2006	2	5:00	Tokyo, Japan	
Win	10–6–2	Adrian Pang	Decision (unanimous)	WR 6: Warrior's Realm	June 24, 2006	3	5:00	Australia	
Draw	9–6–2	Miki Shida	Draw	GCM: D.O.G. 4	December 11, 2005	3	5:00	Tokyo, Japan	
Loss	9–6–1	Hatsu Hioki	Submission (armbar)	Shooto: Gig Central 8	July 3, 2005	2	3:34	Nagoya, Japan	
Win	9–5–1	Akitoshi Tamura	Decision (unanimous)	Shooto: 3/11 in Korakuen Hall	March 11, 2005	2	5:00	Tokyo, Japan	
Loss	8–5–1	Alexandre Franca Nogueira	Submission (guillotine choke)	Shooto: Year End Show 2004	December 14, 2004	1	3:34	Tokyo, Japan	
Loss	8–4–1	Naoya Uematsu	Submission (guillotine choke)	Shooto: Shooto Junkie Is Back!	June 27, 2004	1	0:45	Chiba, Japan	
Win	8–3–1	Bao Quach	Submission (rear naked choke)	Shooto: Year End Show 2003	December 14, 2003	3	4:40	Chiba, Japan	
Win	7–3–1	Denisas Archirejevas	Submission (armbar)	Shooto: 9/5 in Korakuen Hall	September 5, 2003	1	3:45	Tokyo, Japan	
Win	6–3–1	Makoto Ishikawa	Decision (unanimous)	Shooto: 5/4 in Korakuen Hall	May 4, 2003	3	5:00	Tokyo, Japan	
Loss	5–3–1	Tetsuo Katsuta	Decision (unanimous)	Shooto: 3/18 in Korakuen Hall	March 18, 2003	3	5:00	Tokyo, Japan	
Win	5–2–1	Hiroshi Komatsu	Decision (unanimous)	Shooto: Treasure Hunt 11	November 15, 2002	2	5:00	Tokyo, Japan	
Win	4–2–1	Masashi Kameda	Submission (rear naked choke)	Shooto: Treasure Hunt 9	July 27, 2002	1	2:23	Tokyo, Japan	
Loss	3–2–1	Eiji Murayama	Decision (39-38)	GCM: ORG 3rd	June 16, 2002	2	5:00	Tokyo, Japan	
Win	3–1–1	Naoya Miyamoto	Submission (rear naked choke)	Shooto: Wanna Shooto 2002	April 21, 2002	1	2:12	Tokyo, Japan	
Loss	2–1–1	Norifumi Yamamoto	TKO (punches)	Shooto: To The Top 8	September 2, 2001	1	4:02	Tokyo, Japan	
Draw	2–0–1	Koji Takeuchi	Draw	Shooto: To The Top 2	March 2, 2001	2	5:00	Tokyo, Japan	
Win	2–0	Takuhito Hida	Decision (unanimous)	Shooto: To The Top 1	January 19, 2001	2	5:00	Tokyo, Japan	
Win	1–0	Takashi Ohuchi	Submission (rear naked choke)	Shooto: R.E.A.D. 12	November 12, 2000	1	4:10	Tokyo, Japan	
