= Teruyuki =

- Gender: Male

Origin
- Origin: Japanese
- Meaning: Different meanings depending on the kanji used

Teruyuki (written: 照幸, 照之 or 晃之) is a masculine Japanese given name. Notable people with the name include:

- Teruyuki Hashimoto, Japanese mixed martial artist
- Teruyuki Kagawa (香川 照之; born 1965), Japanese actor
- Teruyuki Moniwa (茂庭 照幸; born 1981), Japanese footballer
- Teruyuki Okazaki (岡崎 照幸; born 1931), Japanese karateka
- Teruyuki Tsuchida (土田 晃之; born 1972), Japanese comedian, tarento and TV presenter
