= Anton Kuivanen =

Finnish mixed martial arts fighter

- Born: May 1, 1984 (age 42); Pärnu, then part of Estonian SSR, Soviet Union
- Nationality: Finnish
- Height: 5 ft 8 in (1.73 m)
- Weight: 155 lb (70 kg; 11.1 st)
- Division: Lightweight
- Reach: 72 in (183 cm)
- Stance: Orthodox
- Fighting out of: Helsinki, Finland
- Team: American Top Team; Team MMA Finland; Primus Fight Team (2004–present)
- Years active: 2006–present

Mixed martial arts record
- Total: 39
- Wins: 26
- By knockout: 7
- By submission: 8
- By decision: 11
- Losses: 13
- By knockout: 8
- By submission: 3
- By decision: 2

Other information
- Mixed martial arts record from Sherdog

Anton Kuivanen (born May 1, 1984) is an Estonian-Finnish mixed martial artist and coach. Kuivanen trains and teaches at the GB Gym, which is located in Helsinki, Finland and he has also had training camps in American Top Team located in Coconut Creek, Florida.

== Background ==
Anton Kuivanen was born in Pärnu, Estonia. He has two brothers and their mother Valentina is Russian and their father Vladimir is Finnish and Estonian.

Kuivanen's first touch with martial arts was karate at the age of four in his native Estonia. Anton and his brothers were athletic and active since childhood, playing football and ice hockey. Towards his teenage years, he complemented his combat training with Capoeira, boxing and wrestling before becoming interested in mixed martial arts.

== Mixed martial arts career ==
=== Early career ===
Kuivanen started training mixed martial arts in 2004, winning all of his amateur bouts and eventually winning Finnish mixed martial arts championship in 2006. Kuivanen made his professional mixed martial arts debut in January 2006 in his native Finland. Over the next 6 years, he amassed a record of 16 wins and 4 losses.

In April 2011, he won the Cage Lightweight Championship and successfully defended it in October 2011.

=== Ultimate Fighting Championship ===
On January 16, 2012, it was announced that Kuivanen has signed a multi-fight deal with the UFC. He made his promotional debut on February 15, 2012, against fellow newcomer Justin Salas at UFC on Fuel TV 1. He lost the fight via unanimous decision.

Kuivanen fought Mitch Clarke on July 21, 2012, at UFC 149. He won the bout via split decision.

Kuivanen faced Michael Chiesa on February 23, 2013, at UFC 157. Kuivanen lost to Chiesa via rear-naked choke in the second round after doing well for the first round and defending Chiesa's attacks. He made a mistake against the cage and Chiesa - who is known for his submissions and back control - got him down and after small grappling exchange he got the choke locked and gave Anton chance to tap or go out. Despite having one bout left in his contract, he was subsequently released from the promotion with a record of 1–2.

=== Post-UFC career ===
Anton Kuivanen defended his CAGE lightweight title against Jason Pierce on May 11, 2013, winning by clear decision. His goal of getting back in the UFC took a huge step backwards when he was knocked out by Eric Reynolds in 30 seconds. The underdog landed a punch behind his ear when Kuivanen was moving in. Kuivanen lost his balance, dropped to ground and Reynolds knocked him out cold with finishing punches. Kuivanen was very sad and stated, that he had put effort to being more relaxed before and during the fight than before but it backfired and Kuivanen was too relaxed which lead into his first clean knockout loss and for his first loss in Finland since 2006. Reynolds had said after the fight that he is willing to face him in a rematch.

Kuivanen got back in the cage on November 23, 2013, when he faced Diego Gonzalez in Sweden. Kuivanen needed only 52 seconds to knock Gonzalez out. Likewise, this was his first clean knockout win. He dropped Gonzalez and he looked at the referee. When the referee let the fight go on, Kuivanen put Diego out with few more punches to get the win. He will fight some weeks after this fight in a catchweight bout. He will face Oriol Gaset in Salo, Finland. If he wins his fight against Gaset he will possibly face Reynolds in a rematch for the title and/or face former UFC fighter Reza Madadi, who called Kuivanen out after Kuivanen's fight.

On July 1, 2018, Kuivanen faced the then-reigning lightweight King of Pancrase Takasuke Kume in a non-title bout at Pancrase: 297. Kuivanen won the fight via technical knockout.

Next Kuivanen faced Valeriu Mircea at Cage 44 on September 8, 2018. Kuivanen lost the fight via technical knockout in the second round.

Kuivanen was then expected to face Takasuke Kume in a rematch, which would have been for the Pancrase Lightweight Championship, at Pancrase 304 on April 14, 2019. However, Kuivanen withdrew from the bout due to a knee injury which needed surgery and was replaced by Tom Santos.

After a year of rehabilitating the knee, Kuivanen faced Dan Moret at UAE Warriors 9 on November 29, 2019. He lost the fight via knockout in the second round.

Almost two years removed from his previous bout, Kuivanen is now expected to face Artur Sowiński for the vacant EFM Lightweight Championship at EFM 2 on September 11, 2021.

== Coaching career ==
Having graduated as a certified sports coach from Pajulahti Sports Institute, Kuivanen has been coaching at Crest Professional Fighting Center since 2006.

On July 1, 2020, Kuivanen was appointed as the head coach of Primus Fight Team, the team he has trained in since the beginning of his mixed martial arts career.

== Personal life ==
Kuivanen and his wife have a daughter, Vilma (born 2018) and a son (born 2022).

== Championships and accomplishments ==
- Cage MMA
  - Cage Lightweight Championship (Two time; Current)
- Nordic MMA Awards - MMAviking.com
  - 2013 Knockout of the Year vs. Diego Gonzalez

== Mixed martial arts record ==
Professional record breakdown
39 matches	26 wins	13 losses
By knockout	7	8
By submission	8	3
By decision	11	2
Draws	0	

Res.	Record	Opponent	Method	Event	Date	Round	Time	Location	Notes
Loss	26–13	Artur Sowiński	Decision (majority)	EFM Show 2: Polska vs. Bułgaria	September 11, 2021	5	5:00	Sofia, Bulgaria	For the vacant EFM Lightweight Championship.
Loss	26–12	Dan Moret	KO (punches)	UAE Warriors 9	November 29, 2019	2	4:59	Abu Dhabi, United Arab Emirates	
Loss	26–11	Valeriu Mircea	TKO (punches)	Cage 44	September 8, 2018	2	4:15	Helsinki, Finland	
Win	26–10	Takasuke Kume	TKO (punches)	Pancrase 297	July 1, 2018	2	4:56	Tokyo, Japan	
Win	25–10	Junior Maranhão	Decision (unanimous)	Cage 42	February 17, 2018	3	5:00	Helsinki, Finland	
Win	24–10	Tetsuya Yamada	Decision (unanimous)	Cage 38	February 18, 2017	3	5:00	Helsinki, Finland	
Loss	23–10	Felipe Silva	TKO (punches)	Cage 35	May 13, 2016	1	4:04	Helsinki, Finland	
Loss	23–9	Thibault Gouti	KO (punch)	Cage 33	November 21, 2015	3	1:08	Helsinki, Finland	
Win	23–8	Eric Reynolds	Decision (unanimous)	Cage 31	September 19, 2015	3	5:00	Helsinki, Finland	Won the Cage Lightweight Championship.
Win	22–8	Sean Carter	Decision (unanimous)	Cage 30	May 16, 2015	3	5:00	Helsinki, Finland	
Win	21–8	Sergej Grecicho	Decision (unanimous)	Cage 29	February 28, 2015	3	5:00	Helsinki, Finland	
Loss	20–8	Dakota Cochrane	KO (flying knee)	Fight Night Finland: Cochrane vs Kuivanen	June 14, 2014	1	0:48	Helsinki, Finland	
Win	20–7	Oriol Gaset	TKO (knee to the body)	Grand Combat Entertainment: Seven Virtues of Bushido	December 14, 2013	1	1:03	Salo, Finland	Catchweight of 160 lbs
Win	19–7	Diego Gonzalez	KO (punches)	Superior Challenge 9	November 23, 2013	1	0:52	Gothenburg, Sweden	
Loss	18–7	Eric Reynolds	KO (punches)	Cage 23	September 21, 2013	1	0:30	Vantaa, Finland	Lost Cage Lightweight Championship
Win	18–6	Jason Pierce	Decision (unanimous)	Cage 22	May 11, 2013	3	5:00	Vantaa, Finland	Defended Cage Lightweight Championship
Loss	17–6	Michael Chiesa	Submission (rear naked choke)	UFC 157	February 23, 2013	2	2:29	Anaheim, California, United States	
Win	17–5	Mitch Clarke	Decision (split)	UFC 149	July 21, 2012	3	5:00	Calgary, Alberta, Canada	
Loss	16–5	Justin Salas	Decision (unanimous)	UFC on Fuel TV: Sanchez vs. Ellenberger	February 15, 2012	3	5:00	Omaha, Nebraska, United States	
Win	16–4	Thiago Meller	Decision (unanimous)	Cage 16 - 1st Defense	October 8, 2011	3	5:00	Espoo, Finland	Defended Cage Lightweight Championship
Win	15–4	Ivan Buchinger	Decision (unanimous)	Cage 15 - Powered by Reezig	April 29, 2011	3	5:00	Espoo, Finland	Won Cage Lightweight Championship
Win	14–4	Ryan Bixler	Submission (rear naked choke)	FF 29 - Fight Festival 29	January 31, 2011	2	4:51	Helsinki, Finland	
Win	13–4	Tim Radcliffe	TKO (injury)	Cage 14 - All Stars	November 20, 2010	1	5:00	Espoo, Finland	
Win	12–4	Raymond Jarman	TKO (knee to the body)	Cage 13 - Spring Break	May 8, 2010	3	4:00	Vantaa, Finland	
Win	11–4	Erikas Petraitis	Decision (unanimous)	FF 26 - Fight Festival 26	October 17, 2009	3	5:00	Helsinki, Finland	
Win	10–4	Yunus Evloev	Submission (armbar)	Lappeenranta Fight Night 3	April 25, 2009	1	1:22	Lappeenranta, Finland	
Win	9–4	Alexandre Abin	TKO (punches)	FF 25 - Fight Festival 25	March 14, 2009	1	2:30	Helsinki, Finland	
Win	8–4	Owen Hartwig	Submission (armbar)	AF 2 - Arctic Fights 2	January 17, 2009	1	2:27	Rovaniemi, Finland	
Loss	7–4	Bendy Casimir	Submission (kneebar)	HC 2 - Hell Cage 2	October 19, 2008	1	4:03	Prague, Czech Republic	
Win	7–3	Juris Karpenko	Submission (armbar)	FF 24 - Fight Festival 24	September 20, 2008	1	0:59	Helsinki, Finland	
Win	6–3	Vaclav Stastny	Submission (armbar)	CF 4 - Carelia Fight 4	September 6, 2008	1	1:51	Imatra, Finland	
Win	5–3	Sergei Kudrjashov	Submission (arm triangle choke)	The Cage Vol. 9 - Capital Concussion	December 8, 2007	1	1:23	Helsinki, Finland	
Loss	4–3	Sergej Juskevic	TKO (punches)	K-1 HERO's - HERO's Lithuania 2007	November 10, 2007	2	1:27	Vilnius, Lithuania	
Win	4–2	Takayuki Okochi	TKO (punches)	Shooto Estonia - Bushido	April 14, 2007	1	0:59	Tallinn, Estonia	
Loss	3–2	Marius Liaukevicius	TKO (punches)	K-1 - Hero's Lithuania	November 11, 2006	2	4:27	Vilnius, Lithuania	
Loss	3–1	Hiroki Kotani	Submission (heel hook)	Zst - Prestige	September 23, 2006	1	1:17	Turku, Finland	
Win	3–0	Cole Lauritsen	Decision (unanimous)	CF 2 - Carelia Fight 2	September 2, 2006	3	5:00	Imatra, Finland	
Win	2–0	Martin Ahlberg	Submission (guillotine choke)	The Cage Vol. 6 - Balls to the Wall	May 20, 2006	1	0:35	Helsinki, Finland	
Win	1–0	Sergey Denisov	Submission (rear naked choke)	EKH - MMA Action	January 14, 2006	1	1:48	Espoo, Finland	
