= Takayuki Okochi =

Japanese mixed martial artist

Takayuki Okochi 大河内隆行
- Born: August 15, 1974 (age 52); Japan
- Nationality: Japanese
- Height: 5 ft 9 in (1.75 m)
- Weight: 154 lb (70 kg; 11.0 st)
- Division: Lightweight
- Team: Aciu
- Years active: 1998 - 2009

Mixed martial arts record
- Total: 24
- Wins: 7
- By knockout: 2
- By submission: 1
- By decision: 4
- Losses: 14
- By knockout: 3
- By submission: 2
- By decision: 9
- Draws: 3

Other information
- Mixed martial arts record from Sherdog

Takayuki Okochi Japanese: 大河内隆行 (born August 15, 1974) is a Japanese mixed martial artist. He competed in the Lightweight division.

== Mixed martial arts record ==
Professional record breakdown
24 matches	7 wins	14 losses
By knockout	2	3
By submission	1	2
By decision	4	9
Draws	3	

Res.	Record	Opponent	Method	Event	Date	Round	Time	Location	Notes
Loss	7–14–3	Vladimir Zenin	Decision (unanimous)	Bushido FC: Legends	November 28, 2009	2	5:00	Saint Petersburg, Russia	
Loss	7–13–3	Michiyuki Ishibashi	KO (punch)	Shooto: Shooto Tradition 6	March 20, 2009	1	0:13	Tokyo, Japan	
Loss	7–12–3	Yuri Folomkin	Submission	Union of Veterans of Sport: Championship Cup 2007	November 3, 2007	2	N/A	Russia	
Loss	7–11–3	Paolo Milano	Submission (guillotine choke)	Shooto: Battle Mix Tokyo 4	July 20, 2007	1	0:16	Tokyo, Japan	
Loss	7–10–3	Anton Kuivanen	TKO	Shooto Estonia: Bushido	April 14, 2007	1	0:59	Tallinn, Estonia	
Loss	7–9–3	Erikas Petraitis	Decision (unanimous)	K-1 HERO'S: HERO's Lithuania 2005	November 26, 2005	2	5:00	Vilnius, Lithuania	
Loss	7–8–3	Tomonari Kanomata	Decision (unanimous)	Shooto 2004: 5/3 in Korakuen Hall	May 3, 2004	2	5:00	Tokyo, Japan	
Loss	7–7–3	Mitsuhiro Ishida	Decision (unanimous)	Shooto 2004: 1/24 in Korakuen Hall	January 24, 2004	2	5:00	Tokyo, Japan	
Draw	7–6–3	Darius Skliaudys	Draw	Shooto Lithuania: King of Bushido Stage 1	November 14, 2003	2	5:00	Vilnius, Lithuania	
Draw	7–6–2	Takafumi Hanai	Draw	Zst: The Battlefield 3	June 1, 2003	3	3:00	Tokyo, Japan	
Loss	7–6–1	Daisuke Sugie	Decision (unanimous)	Shooto: Gig Central 3	March 30, 2003	2	5:00	Nagoya, Aichi, Japan	
Win	7–5–1	Mindaugas Smirnovas	Submission (triangle choke)	Rings Lithuania: Bushido Rings 5: Shock	November 9, 2002	1	3:22	Vilnius, Lithuania	
Win	6–5–1	Masato Fujiwara	TKO (punches)	Shooto: Gig East 11	September 25, 2002	2	4:24	Tokyo, Japan	
Win	5–5–1	Hiroki Kotani	KO (knee)	Shooto: Treasure Hunt 9	July 27, 2002	1	2:06	Setagaya, Tokyo, Japan	
Loss	4–5–1	Naoki Matsushita	Decision (majority)	Shooto: Gig Central 1	March 31, 2002	2	5:00	Nagoya, Aichi, Japan	
Win	4–4–1	Mitsuo Matsumoto	Decision (unanimous)	Shooto: Treasure Hunt 2	January 25, 2002	2	5:00	Setagaya, Tokyo, Japan	
Loss	3–4–1	Kuniyoshi Hironaka	Decision (unanimous)	Shooto: Gig East 6	October 23, 2001	2	5:00	Tokyo, Japan	
Win	3–3–1	Tomonori Ohara	Decision (unanimous)	Shooto: Gig East 2	May 22, 2001	2	5:00	Tokyo, Japan	
Loss	2–3–1	Seichi Ikemoto	KO (knees)	Shooto: Gig West 1	February 18, 2001	1	4:01	Osaka, Japan	
Win	2–2–1	Matthias Riccio	Decision (majority)	Shooto: R.E.A.D. 12	November 12, 2000	2	5:00	Tokyo, Japan	
Loss	1–2–1	Shigetoshi Iwase	Decision (majority)	Shooto: R.E.A.D. 4	April 12, 2000	2	5:00	Setagaya, Tokyo, Japan	
Loss	1–1–1	Saburo Kawakatsu	Decision (unanimous)	Shooto: Shooter's Passion	May 27, 1999	2	5:00	Setagaya, Tokyo, Japan	
Draw	1–0–1	Norio Fujita	Draw	Shooto: Shooter's Soul	January 27, 1999	2	5:00	Setagaya, Tokyo, Japan	
Win	1–0	Hiromichi Maruyama	Decision (majority)	Shooto: Shooter's Dream	September 18, 1998	2	5:00	Setagaya, Tokyo, Japan	

== See also ==
- List of male mixed martial artists
