= Katsuya Toida =

Japanese mixed martial arts fighter

- Born: January 6, 1977 (age 49); Japan
- Nationality: Japanese
- Height: 5 ft 9 in (1.75 m)
- Weight: 183 lb (83 kg; 13.1 st)
- Division: Bantamweight; Featherweight
- Team: Wajutsu Keishukai Toikatsu
- Years active: 1998 - 2013

Mixed martial arts record
- Total: 30
- Wins: 13
- By submission: 5
- By decision: 7
- Unknown: 1
- Losses: 13
- By knockout: 5
- By submission: 3
- By decision: 5
- Draws: 3
- No contests: 1

Other information
- Mixed martial arts record from Sherdog

Katsuya Toida (戸井田 カツヤ, Toida Katsuya; born January 6, 1977) is a Japanese mixed martial artist. He competed in the Bantamweight and Featherweight divisions. His real name is Katsuya Toida (戸井田 克也, Toida Katsuya). He is known for his judo and shoot wrestling expertise.

== Mixed martial arts career ==
On August 23, 1998, Toida participated in the lightweight tournament of the 5th All Japan Amateur Shooto Championship. He lost to Kazuhiro Inoue in the final and became the runner-up. He would make his professional debut on September 18, 1998, against Naoya Uematsu and lose via armbar.

On December 16, 2001, he faced Alexandre Franca Nogueira for the Shooto Lightweight (-65kg) Championship and failed to win the title after losing a 0-3 decision.

In May 2003, he lost to Baret Yoshida in the first round of the ADCC World Championship under 66 kg weight class.

Toida fought Rumina Sato in the semifinals of the 2005 Shooto Pacific Rim Lightweight Championship tournament, losing by KO with a right hook.

Toida fought Kazunori Yokota at the DEEP Cage Impact 2011 in Tokyo, losing by TKO after a soccer kick and ground and pound in the 2nd round.

On April 26, 2013, he fought Seiji Akao at DEEP 62 IMPACT and lost by decision (0–3). After the match, he announced his retirement in the ring.

== Championships and accomplishments ==
- Shooto
  - All Japan Amateur Shooto Championship Lightweight Runner-up (1998)
- Submission wrestling
  - All Japan Combat Wrestling Championship MVP (2002)

== Mixed martial arts record ==
Professional record breakdown
30 matches	13 wins	13 losses
By knockout	0	5
By submission	5	3
By decision	7	5
By disqualification	1	0
Draws	3	
No contests	1	

Res.	Record	Opponent	Method	Event	Date	Round	Time	Location	Notes
Loss	13–13–3 (1)	Seiji Akao	Decision (unanimous)	Deep: 62 Impact	April 26, 2013	2	5:00	Tokyo, Japan	
Win	13–12–3 (1)	Hiroyuki Kobayashi	Decision (unanimous)	Deep: Cage Impact 2012 in Tokyo: 1st Round	December 8, 2012	2	5:00	Tokyo, Japan	
Loss	12–12–3 (1)	Makoto Kamaya	TKO (punches)	Deep: 57 Impact	February 18, 2012	1	1:13	Tokyo, Japan	
Loss	12–11–3 (1)	Kazunori Yokota	TKO (soccer kicks and punches)	Deep: Cage Impact 2011 in Tokyo, 1st Round	October 29, 2011	2	0:25	Tokyo, Japan	
Loss	12–10–3 (1)	Issei Tamura	KO (punches)	Shooto: Gig Tokyo 7	August 6, 2011	1	1:23	Tokyo, Japan	
NC	12–9–3 (1)	Shigeki Osawa	NC (accidental kicks to the groin)	World Victory Road Presents: Sengoku Raiden Championships 13	June 20, 2010	3	1:35	Tokyo, Japan	
Win	12–9–3	Yusuke Yachi	DQ (illegal upkick)	Shooto: The Way of Shooto 2: Like a Tiger, Like a Dragon	March 22, 2010	1	3:45	Tokyo, Japan	
Win	11–9–3	Wataru Takahashi	Submission (rear-naked choke)	GCM: Cage Force 14	December 5, 2009	2	0:28	Tokyo, Japan	
Loss	10–9–3	Tetsu Suzuki	TKO (punches)	GCM: Cage Force 7	June 22, 2008	1	0:16	Tokyo, Japan	
Loss	10–8–3	Hatsu Hioki	Submission (armbar)	Shooto: Back To Our Roots 7	January 26, 2008	2	4:30	Tokyo, Japan	
Loss	10–7–3	Takeshi Inoue	Decision (unanimous)	Shooto: Back To Our Roots 6	November 8, 2007	3	5:00	Tokyo, Japan	
Win	10–6–3	Gustavo Franca	Decision (unanimous)	Heat: Heat 4	August 11, 2007	3	5:00	Nagoya, Aichi, Japan	
Draw	9–6–3	Adrian Pang	Draw	WR 9: Warriors Realm 9	May 12, 2007	3	5:00	Australia	
Draw	9–6–2	Tenkei Oda	Draw	Shooto: 11/10 in Korakuen Hall	November 10, 2006	3	5:00	Tokyo, Japan	
Loss	9–6–1	Atsushi Yamamoto	Decision (unanimous)	K-1: Hero's 3	September 7, 2005	2	5:00	Tokyo, Japan	
Win	9–5–1	Makoto Ishikawa	Submission (rear-naked choke)	Shooto 2005: 7/30 in Korakuen Hall	July 30, 2005	2	4:09	Tokyo, Japan	
Draw	8–5–1	Atsushi Yamamoto	Draw	GCM: D.O.G. 1	March 12, 2005	3	5:00	Tokyo, Japan	
Loss	8–5	Rumina Sato	KO (punch)	Shooto: Year End Show 2004	December 14, 2004	2	1:21	Tokyo, Japan	
Win	8–4	Jin Kazeta	Submission (armbar)	Shooto 2004: 4/16 in Kitazawa Town Hall	April 16, 2004	2	4:19	Setagaya, Tokyo, Japan	
Loss	7–4	Naoya Uematsu	Submission (achilles lock)	Shooto: Wanna Shooto 2003	November 3, 2003	1	4:06	Tokyo, Japan	
Win	7–3	Rami Boukai	Decision (majority)	Shooto: 1/24 in Korakuen Hall	January 24, 2003	2	5:00	Tokyo, Japan	
Loss	6–3	Alexandre Franca Nogueira	Decision (unanimous)	Shooto: To The Top Final Act	December 16, 2001	3	5:00	Urayasu, Chiba, Japan	
Win	6–2	Baret Yoshida	Decision (majority)	Shooto: To The Top 6	July 6, 2001	3	5:00	Tokyo, Japan	
Win	5–2	Osmar Diaz Fernandez	Technical Submission (armbar)	Shooto: To The Top 4	May 1, 2001	1	0:37	Tokyo, Japan	
Win	4–2	Hisao Ikeda	Decision (unanimous)	Shooto: To The Top 1	January 19, 2001	3	5:00	Tokyo, Japan	
Win	3–2	Hiroshi Umemura	Submission (armbar)	Shooto: R.E.A.D. 12	November 12, 2000	1	2:07	Tokyo, Japan	
Win	2–2	Takeru Ueno	Decision (unanimous)	Shooto: R.E.A.D. 7	July 22, 2000	2	5:00	Setagaya, Tokyo, Japan	
Loss	1–2	Kazuhiro Inoue	Decision (majority)	Shooto: R.E.A.D. 5	May 22, 2000	2	5:00	Tokyo, Japan	
Win	1–1	Tetsuo Katsuta	Decision (unanimous)	Shooto: Gig '99	April 9, 1999	2	5:00	Tokyo, Japan	
Loss	0–1	Naoya Uematsu	Submission (armbar)	Shooto: Shooter's Dream	September 18, 1998	1	2:46	Setagaya, Tokyo, Japan	

== Submission grappling record ==
KO PUNCHES

Result	Opponent	Method	Event	Date	Round	Time	Notes
Loss	(Japan) Baret Yoshida	Submission (rear naked choke)	Gi Grappling 2005	2004			
Draw	(Japan) Takumi Yano	Decision (unanimous)	CAND	2004			
Loss	(Japan) Koji Komuro	Submission (sode guruma jime)	THE CONTENDERS 8	2003			
Loss	(Japan) Baret Yoshida	Decision (unanimous)	THE CONTENDERS Millennium-1	2001			
Win	(Japan) Takumi Yano	Decision (unanimous)	THE CONTENDERS Millennium-1	2001			

== See also ==
- List of male mixed martial artists
