= Koji Takeuchi =

Japanese mixed martial artist

- Born: May 29, 1974 (age 52); Japan
- Nationality: Japanese
- Height: 5 ft 7 in (1.70 m)
- Weight: 165 lb (75 kg; 11.8 st)
- Division: Welterweight
- Team: HLC Gym
- Years active: 1999 - 2014

Mixed martial arts record
- Total: 20
- Wins: 7
- By submission: 4
- By decision: 3
- Losses: 8
- By decision: 8
- Draws: 5

Other information
- Mixed martial arts record from Sherdog

Koji Takeuchi (born May 29, 1974) is a Japanese mixed martial artist. He competed in the Welterweight division.

== Mixed martial arts record ==
Professional record breakdown
20 matches	7 wins	8 losses
By submission	4	0
By decision	3	8
Draws	5	

Res.	Record	Opponent	Method	Event	Date	Round	Time	Location	Notes
Win	7–8–5	Hiroshi Kozakai	Submission (rear-naked choke)	Pancrase: Sapporo	June 22, 2014	1	1:24	Sapporo, Hokkaido, Japan	
Win	6–8–5	Hyung-Seok Lee	Submission (guillotine choke)	PRO Fighting: PRO FC 9	May 25, 2014	2	2:06	Taipei, Taiwan	
Win	5–8–5	Hidekazu Asakura	Decision (unanimous)	Bout: Bout 15	October 20, 2013	2	5:00	Hakodate, Hokkaido, Japan	
Win	4–8–5	Hidekazu Asakura	Decision (majority)	BM 6: Battle Mix 6	May 21, 2006	2	5:00	Sapporo, Hokkaido, Japan	
Loss	3–8–5	Kabuto Kokage	Decision (unanimous)	Shooto 2005: 7/30 in Korakuen Hall	July 30, 2005	2	5:00	Tokyo, Japan	
Loss	3–7–5	Komei Okada	Decision (unanimous)	Shooto: 9/26 in Kourakuen Hall	September 26, 2004	2	5:00	Tokyo, Japan	
Win	3–6–5	Wataru Miki	Submission (armbar)	Shooto 2004: 4/16 in Kitazawa Town Hall	April 16, 2004	1	4:11	Setagaya, Tokyo, Japan	
Loss	2–6–5	Ganjo Tentsuku	Decision (unanimous)	Shooto: Who is Young Leader!	October 31, 2003	2	5:00	Tokyo, Japan	
Draw	2–5–5	Tashiro Nishiuchi	Draw	Deep: 8th Impact	March 4, 2003	3	5:00	Tokyo, Japan	
Loss	2–5–4	Masato Fujiwara	Decision (unanimous)	Shooto: To The Top 10	November 25, 2001	2	5:00	Tokyo, Japan	
Loss	2–4–4	Hiroshi Tsuruya	Decision (unanimous)	Shooto: To The Top 9	September 27, 2001	2	5:00	Tokyo, Japan	
Loss	2–3–4	Takeshi Yamazaki	Decision (majority)	Shooto: To The Top 5	June 30, 2001	2	5:00	Setagaya, Tokyo, Japan	
Draw	2–2–4	Hideki Kadowaki	Draw	Shooto: To The Top 2	March 2, 2001	2	5:00	Tokyo, Japan	
Draw	2–2–3	Takaharu Murahama	Draw	Shooto: R.E.A.D. 12	November 12, 2000	2	5:00	Tokyo, Japan	
Draw	2–2–2	Takumi Nakayama	Draw	Shooto: R.E.A.D. 6	July 16, 2000	2	5:00	Tokyo, Japan	
Win	2–2–1	Makoto Ishikawa	Decision (majority)	Shooto: R.E.A.D. 5	May 22, 2000	2	5:00	Tokyo, Japan	
Draw	1–2–1	Tetsuharu Ikei	Draw	Shooto: Shooter's Ambition	October 6, 1999	2	5:00	Setagaya, Tokyo, Japan	
Win	1–2	Mitsuo Matsumoto	Submission (triangle choke)	Shooto: Shooter's Passion	May 27, 1999	2	1:30	Setagaya, Tokyo, Japan	
Loss	0–2	Kazuya Abe	Decision (unanimous)	Shooto: Renaxis 1	March 28, 1999	2	5:00	Tokyo, Japan	
Loss	0–1	Kohei Yasumi	Decision (unanimous)	Shooto: Shooter's Soul	January 27, 1999	2	5:00	Setagaya, Tokyo, Japan	

== See also ==
- List of male mixed martial artists
