= Makoto Ishikawa =

Japanese mixed martial artist

Makoto Ishikawa 石川誠
- Born: October 12, 1974 (age 52); Japan
- Nationality: Japanese
- Height: 5 ft 8 in (1.73 m)
- Weight: 143 lb (65 kg; 10.2 st)
- Division: Featherweight; Lightweight
- Team: Purebred Omiya
- Years active: 1999 - 2009

Mixed martial arts record
- Total: 21
- Wins: 11
- By knockout: 1
- By submission: 2
- By decision: 8
- Losses: 10
- By knockout: 2
- By submission: 1
- By decision: 7

Other information
- Mixed martial arts record from Sherdog

Makoto Ishikawa Japanese: 石川誠 (born October 12, 1974) is a Japanese mixed martial artist. He competed in the Featherweight and Lightweight divisions.

== Mixed martial arts record ==
Professional record breakdown
22 matches	11 wins	10 losses
By knockout	1	2
By submission	2	1
By decision	8	7
Draws	1	

Res.	Record	Opponent	Method	Event	Date	Round	Time	Location	Notes
Loss	11–10–1	Hidehiko Hasegawa	Decision (unanimous)	Deep: 40 Impact	February 20, 2009	2	5:00	Tokyo, Japan	
Loss	11–9–1	Yoshihiro Tomioka	KO (punches)	Deep: 31 Impact	August 5, 2007	1	3:12	Tokyo, Japan	
Loss	11–8–1	Takeshi Inoue	Decision (unanimous)	Shooto: The Victory of the Truth	February 17, 2006	3	5:00	Tokyo, Japan	
Loss	11–7–1	Katsuya Toida	Submission (rear-naked choke)	Shooto 2005: 7/30 in Korakuen Hall	July 30, 2005	2	4:09	Tokyo, Japan	
Loss	11–6–1	Rumina Sato	Decision (unanimous)	Shooto: 3/11 in Korakuen Hall	March 11, 2005	3	5:00	Tokyo, Japan	
Win	11–5–1	Hiroyuki Abe	TKO (cut)	Shooto: Year End Show 2004	December 14, 2004	3	0:40	Tokyo, Japan	
Win	10–5–1	Antoine Skinner	Decision (unanimous)	SB 35: SuperBrawl 35	April 16, 2004	3	5:00	Honolulu, Hawaii, United States	
Win	9–5–1	Tetsuo Katsuta	Decision (unanimous)	Shooto 2004: 1/24 in Korakuen Hall	January 24, 2004	3	5:00	Tokyo, Japan	
Draw	8–5–1	Tetsuo Katsuta	Technical Draw	Shooto: Wanna Shooto 2003	November 3, 2003	1	1:22	Tokyo, Japan	
Loss	8–5	Hideki Kadowaki	Decision (unanimous)	Shooto: 5/4 in Korakuen Hall	May 4, 2003	3	5:00	Tokyo, Japan	
Win	8–4	Eiji Murayama	Decision (unanimous)	Shooto: Treasure Hunt 10	September 16, 2002	2	5:00	Yokohama, Kanagawa, Japan	
Win	7–4	Yohei Nanbu	Decision (majority)	Shooto: Treasure Hunt 5	March 15, 2002	2	5:00	Tokyo, Japan	
Win	6–4	David Velasquez	Submission (armbar)	Shogun 1: Shogun 1	December 15, 2001	1	4:36	Honolulu, Hawaii, United States	
Loss	5–4	Kazuya Abe	KO (punch)	Shooto: To The Top 8	September 2, 2001	1	0:29	Tokyo, Japan	
Win	5–3	Koichi Tanaka	Decision (unanimous)	Shooto: Gig East 3	June 14, 2001	2	5:00	Tokyo, Japan	
Win	4–3	Eugene Hynson	Submission (armbar)	Shooto: Wanna Shooto 2001	April 8, 2001	2	4:42	Setagaya, Tokyo, Japan	
Loss	3–3	Koji Takeuchi	Decision (majority)	Shooto: R.E.A.D. 5	May 22, 2000	2	5:00	Tokyo, Japan	
Win	3–2	Kazumichi Takada	Decision (unanimous)	Shooto: R.E.A.D. 4	April 12, 2000	2	5:00	Setagaya, Tokyo, Japan	
Win	2–2	Jinzaburo Yonezawa	Decision (unanimous)	Shooto: R.E.A.D. 1	January 14, 2000	2	5:00	Tokyo, Japan	
Loss	1–2	Dokonjonosuke Mishima	Decision (unanimous)	Shooto: Renaxis 3	August 4, 1999	2	5:00	Setagaya, Tokyo, Japan	
Loss	1–1	Satoshi Fujisaki	Decision (unanimous)	Shooto: Shooter's Passion	May 27, 1999	2	5:00	Setagaya, Tokyo, Japan	
Win	1–0	Mitsuo Matsumoto	Decision (unanimous)	Shooto: Devilock Fighters	January 15, 1999	2	5:00	Tokyo, Japan	

== See also ==
- List of male mixed martial artists
