= Tetsuo Katsuta =

Japanese mixed martial arts fighter

Tetsuo Katsuta 勝田哲夫
- Born: March 21, 1978 (age 48); Japan
- Nationality: Japanese
- Height: 5 ft 5 in (1.65 m)
- Weight: 143 lb (65 kg; 10.2 st)
- Division: Featherweight
- Team: K'z Factory
- Years active: 1999 - 2004

Mixed martial arts record
- Total: 14
- Wins: 7
- By submission: 2
- By decision: 5
- Losses: 5
- By knockout: 1
- By submission: 1
- By decision: 3
- Draws: 2

Other information
- Mixed martial arts record from Sherdog

Tetsuo Katsuta Japanese: 勝田哲夫 (born March 21, 1978) is a Japanese mixed martial artist. He competed in the Featherweight division.

== Mixed martial arts record ==
Professional record breakdown
14 matches	7 wins	5 losses
By knockout	0	1
By submission	2	1
By decision	5	3
Draws	2	

Res.	Record	Opponent	Method	Event	Date	Round	Time	Location	Notes
Loss	7–5–2	Makoto Ishikawa	Decision (unanimous)	Shooto 2004: 1/24 in Korakuen Hall	January 24, 2004	3	5:00	Tokyo, Japan	
Draw	7–4–2	Makoto Ishikawa	Technical Draw	Shooto: Wanna Shooto 2003	November 3, 2003	1	1:22	Tokyo, Japan	
Win	7–4–1	Hideki Kadowaki	Decision (unanimous)	Shooto: 3/18 in Korakuen Hall	March 18, 2003	3	5:00	Tokyo, Japan	
Loss	6–4–1	Norifumi Yamamoto	TKO (punches)	Shooto: Treasure Hunt 10	September 16, 2002	1	2:45	Yokohama, Kanagawa, Japan	
Draw	6–3–1	Kazuhiro Inoue	Draw	Shooto: Treasure Hunt 8	July 19, 2002	3	5:00	Tokyo, Japan	
Loss	6–3	Alexandre Franca Nogueira	Submission (guillotine choke)	Shooto: To The Top 8	September 2, 2001	2	2:45	Tokyo, Japan	For Shooto Lightweight Championship
Win	6–2	Alexandre Franca Nogueira	Decision (majority)	Shooto: To The Top 4	May 1, 2001	3	5:00	Tokyo, Japan	Non-Title Bout
Win	5–2	Baret Yoshida	Decision (unanimous)	Shooto: To The Top 1	January 19, 2001	3	5:00	Tokyo, Japan	
Win	4–2	Hiroshi Umemura	Decision (unanimous)	Shooto: R.E.A.D. 10	September 15, 2000	2	5:00	Tokyo, Japan	
Win	3–2	Kazuhiro Inoue	Decision (unanimous)	Shooto: R.E.A.D. 7	July 22, 2000	2	5:00	Setagaya, Tokyo, Japan	
Win	2–2	Teruyuki Hashimoto	Submission (rear-naked choke)	Shooto: R.E.A.D. 4	April 12, 2000	1	4:29	Setagaya, Tokyo, Japan	
Loss	1–2	Anthony Hamlett	Decision (majority)	SB 15: SuperBrawl 15	December 7, 1999	2	5:00	Honolulu, Hawaii, United States	
Win	1–1	Tatsuya Sakurai	Submission (rear-naked choke)	Shooto: Gateway to the Extremes	November 4, 1999	2	3:33	Setagaya, Tokyo, Japan	
Loss	0–1	Katsuya Toida	Decision (unanimous)	Shooto: Gig '99	April 9, 1999	2	5:00	Tokyo, Japan	

== See also ==
- List of male mixed martial artists
