= Takaharu Murahama =

Japanese mixed martial artist

Takaharu Murahama 村濱天治
- Born: September 2, 1972 (age 54); Japan
- Nationality: Japanese
- Height: 5 ft 6 in (1.68 m)
- Weight: 154 lb (70 kg; 11.0 st)
- Division: Middleweight; Welterweight; Lightweight
- Style: Judo, Karate
- Team: Ugokai; Wild Phoenix
- Years active: 1998 - 2004

Mixed martial arts record
- Total: 24
- Wins: 10
- By knockout: 2
- By submission: 3
- By decision: 5
- Losses: 9
- By knockout: 1
- By submission: 2
- By decision: 6
- Draws: 5

Other information
- Mixed martial arts record from Sherdog

Takaharu Murahama (Japanese: 村濱 天晴, Murahama Takaharu; born September 9, 1972) is a Japanese mixed martial artist. He competed in the Lightweight division. He is the brother of professional wrestler and kickboxer Takehiro Murahama.

== Career ==
Prior to his pro debut he won 3rd place in the middleweight category (-74 kg) at the 4th All Japan Amateur Shooto Championship. In addition, he holds notable victories over the likes of Chris Brennan, Sergei Bytchkov, Yuji Hoshino, and Kotetsu Boku.

== Mixed martial arts record ==
Professional record breakdown
24 matches	10 wins	9 losses
By knockout	2	1
By submission	3	2
By decision	5	6
Draws	5	

Res.	Record	Opponent	Method	Event	Date	Round	Time	Location	Notes
Loss	10–9–5	Kotetsu Boku	Decision (unanimous)	Shooto: 9/26 in Kourakuen Hall	September 26, 2004	3	5:00	Tokyo, Japan	
Win	10–8–5	Kenichiro Togashi	Decision (unanimous)	Shooto 2004: 5/3 in Korakuen Hall	May 3, 2004	3	5:00	Tokyo, Japan	
Loss	9–8–5	Marcio Ramos Barbosa	TKO (cut)	Shooto: 7/13 in Korakuen Hall	July 13, 2003	1	4:09	Tokyo, Japan	
Win	9–7–5	Thomas Hytten	Decision (unanimous)	Shooto: 3/18 in Korakuen Hall	March 18, 2003	2	5:00	Tokyo, Japan	
Win	8–7–5	Chris Brennan	Submission (achilles lock)	Shooto: 1/24 in Korakuen Hall	January 24, 2003	1	2:49	Tokyo, Japan	Return to Lightweight.
Loss	7–7–5	Ryuki Ueyama	Submission (rear-naked choke)	Deep: 5th Impact	June 9, 2002	3	1:44	Tokyo, Japan	
Win	7–6–5	Yuji Hoshino	Technical Submission (leg scissor choke)	Deep: 5th Impact	June 9, 2002	2	1:23	Tokyo, Japan	Middleweight debut.
Win	6–6–5	Kotetsu Boku	Submission (kneebar)	Shooto: Treasure Hunt 6	May 5, 2002	2	3:17	Tokyo, Japan	
Win	5–6–5	Yohei Suzuki	Decision (unanimous)	Shooto: Gig East 8	February 28, 2002	2	5:00	Tokyo, Japan	
Loss	4–6–5	Koji Oishi	Decision (majority)	Deep: 3rd Impact	December 23, 2001	3	5:00	Tokyo, Japan	
Loss	4–5–5	Daisuke Sugie	Submission (armbar)	Shooto: Gig West 2	September 23, 2001	1	1:32	Osaka, Japan	Return to Lightweight.
Loss	4–4–5	Takumi Nakayama	Technical Decision (unanimous)	Shooto: Gig East 4	July 27, 2001	2	0:00	Tokyo, Japan	Featherweight debut.
Draw	4–3–5	Toniko Junior	Draw	Shooto: To The Top 4	May 1, 2001	2	5:00	Tokyo, Japan	
Win	4–3–4	Yohei Nanbu	Decision (unanimous)	Shooto: To The Top 1	January 19, 2001	2	5:00	Tokyo, Japan	
Draw	3–3–4	Koji Takeuchi	Draw	Shooto: R.E.A.D. 12	November 12, 2000	2	5:00	Tokyo, Japan	
Win	3–3–3	Sergei Bytchkov	KO (flying knee)	Shooto: R.E.A.D. 9	August 27, 2000	1	0:11	Setagaya, Tokyo, Japan	
Loss	2–3–3	Ryan Bow	Decision (majority)	Shooto: R.E.A.D. 5	May 22, 2000	2	5:00	Tokyo, Japan	
Loss	2–2–3	Isao Tanimura	Decision (unanimous)	Shooto: R.E.A.D. 2	March 17, 2000	2	5:00	Tokyo, Japan	
Draw	2–1–3	Hiroyuki Kojima	Draw	Shooto: Shooter's Ambition	October 6, 1999	2	5:00	Setagaya, Tokyo, Japan	Welterweight bout.
Win	2–1–2	Yohei Suzuki	Decision (unanimous)	Shooto: Renaxis 3	August 4, 1999	2	5:00	Setagaya, Tokyo, Japan	
Draw	1–1–2	Saburo Kawakatsu	Draw	Shooto: Las Grandes Viajes 6	November 27, 1998	2	5:00	Tokyo, Japan	
Draw	1–1–1	Hiroshi Tsuruya	Draw	Shooto: Gig '98 2nd	July 18, 1998	2	5:00	Tokyo, Japan	
Loss	1–1	Masakazu Kuramochi	Decision (majority)	Shooto: Las Grandes Viajes 3	May 13, 1998	2	5:00	Tokyo, Japan	Lightweight debut.
Win	1–0	Hiroyuki Kojima	KO (punch)	Shooto: Las Grandes Viajes 2	March 1, 1998	1	2:31	Tokyo, Japan	

== See also ==
- List of male mixed martial artists
