= Chikara Miyake =

Japanese mixed martial artist

Chikara Miyake 三宅力
- Born: Japan
- Nationality: Japanese
- Weight: 154 lb (70 kg; 11.0 st)
- Division: Lightweight
- Team: Chokushinkai
- Years active: 1999 - 2000

Mixed martial arts record
- Total: 4
- Wins: 1
- By submission: 1
- Losses: 2
- By decision: 2
- Draws: 1

Other information
- Mixed martial arts record from Sherdog

Chikara Miyake Japanese: 三宅力 is a Japanese mixed martial artist. He competed in the Lightweight division.

== Mixed martial arts record ==
Professional record breakdown
4 matches	1 win	2 losses
By submission	1	0
By decision	0	2
Draws	1	

Res.	Record	Opponent	Method	Event	Date	Round	Time	Location	Notes
Loss	1–2–1	Takumi Nakayama	Decision (unanimous)	Shooto: Gig West 1	February 18, 2001	2	5:00	Osaka, Japan	
Loss	1–1–1	Kohei Yasumi	Decision (unanimous)	Shooto: R.E.A.D. 6	July 16, 2000	2	5:00	Tokyo, Japan	
Win	1–0–1	Koichi Tanaka	Submission (rear-naked choke)	Shooto: Renaxis 5	October 29, 1999	1	2:16	Kadoma, Osaka, Japan	
Draw	0–0–1	Jinzaburo Yonezawa	Draw	Shooto: Shooter's Soul	January 27, 1999	2	5:00	Setagaya, Tokyo, Japan	

== See also ==
- List of male mixed martial artists
