= Mitsuo Matsumoto =

Japanese mixed martial artist

Mitsuo Matsumoto 松本光男
- Born: July 18, 1971 (age 55); Japan
- Nationality: Japanese
- Height: 5 ft 5 in (1.65 m)
- Weight: 155 lb (70 kg; 11.1 st)
- Division: Lightweight
- Team: Master Japan
- Years active: 1997 - 2006

Mixed martial arts record
- Total: 20
- Wins: 9
- By knockout: 1
- By decision: 8
- Losses: 10
- By knockout: 1
- By submission: 3
- By decision: 6
- Draws: 1

Other information
- Mixed martial arts record from Sherdog

Mitsuo Matsumoto Japanese: 松本光男 (born July 18, 1971) is a Japanese mixed martial artist. He competed in the Lightweight division.

== Mixed martial arts record ==
Professional record breakdown
20 matches	9 wins	10 losses
By knockout	1	1
By submission	0	3
By decision	8	6
Draws	1	

Res.	Record	Opponent	Method	Event	Date	Round	Time	Location	Notes
Loss	9–10–1	Eriya Matsuda	TKO (punches)	Pancrase: 2006 Neo-Blood Tournament Semifinals	April 2, 2006	2	3:46	Tokyo, Japan	
Win	9–9–1	Yuichi Ikari	TKO (doctor stoppage)	Pancrase: 2006 Neo-Blood Tournament Eliminations	February 19, 2006	1	2:04	Tokyo, Japan	
Loss	8–9–1	Sotaro Yamada	Submission (rear-naked choke)	Pancrase: 2005 Neo-Blood Tournament Eliminations	February 27, 2005	2	2:10	Tokyo, Japan	
Win	8–8–1	Tomoya Miyashita	Decision (unanimous)	Pancrase: Brave 12	December 21, 2004	2	5:00	Tokyo, Japan	
Win	7–8–1	Hiroyuki Ota	Decision (unanimous)	Pancrase: Brave 11	November 26, 2004	2	5:00	Tokyo, Japan	
Win	6–8–1	Motokazu Kobayashi	Decision (unanimous)	Pancrase: Brave 8	September 24, 2004	2	5:00	Tokyo, Japan	
Loss	5–8–1	Ippo Watanuki	Submission (armbar)	Pancrase: Brave 3	March 29, 2004	1	3:23	Tokyo, Japan	
Win	5–7–1	Hiroki Kotani	Decision (majority)	Shooto: 2/6 in Kitazawa Town Hall	February 6, 2003	2	5:00	Setagaya, Tokyo, Japan	
Loss	4–7–1	Kotetsu Boku	Decision (unanimous)	Shooto: Treasure Hunt 4	March 13, 2002	2	5:00	Setagaya, Tokyo, Japan	
Loss	4–6–1	Takayuki Okochi	Decision (unanimous)	Shooto: Treasure Hunt 2	January 25, 2002	2	5:00	Setagaya, Tokyo, Japan	
Win	4–5–1	Takashi Ochi	Decision (unanimous)	Shooto: To The Top 3	March 21, 2001	2	5:00	Setagaya, Tokyo, Japan	
Draw	3–5–1	Hiroki Kotani	Draw	Shooto: R.E.A.D. 7	July 22, 2000	2	5:00	Setagaya, Tokyo, Japan	
Loss	3–5	Yohei Suzuki	Decision (unanimous)	Shooto: R.E.A.D. 1	January 14, 2000	2	5:00	Tokyo, Japan	
Win	3–4	Kieran Hewett	Decision (unanimous)	Shooto: Gateway to the Extremes	November 4, 1999	2	5:00	Setagaya, Tokyo, Japan	
Win	2–4	Shinsuke Ueno	Decision (unanimous)	Shooto: Renaxis 3	August 4, 1999	2	5:00	Setagaya, Tokyo, Japan	
Loss	1–4	Koji Takeuchi	Submission (triangle choke)	Shooto: Shooter's Passion	May 27, 1999	2	1:30	Setagaya, Tokyo, Japan	
Loss	1–3	Makoto Ishikawa	Decision (unanimous)	Shooto: Devilock Fighters	January 15, 1999	2	5:00	Tokyo, Japan	
Loss	1–2	Masakazu Kuramochi	Decision (unanimous)	Shooto: Gig '98 1st	April 10, 1998	2	5:00	Tokyo, Japan	
Loss	1–1	Naoya Uematsu	Decision (unanimous)	Lumax Cup: Tournament of J '97 Lightweight Tournament	December 20, 1997	2	3:00	Japan	
Win	1–0	Yoshihiro Fujita	Decision (unanimous)	Lumax Cup: Tournament of J '97 Lightweight Tournament	December 20, 1997	2	3:00	Japan	

== See also ==
- List of male mixed martial artists
