= Kohei Yasumi =

Japanese mixed martial artist

- Born: November 27, 1978 (age 47); Japan
- Nationality: Japanese
- Height: 5 ft 6 in (1.68 m)
- Weight: 154 lb (70 kg; 11.0 st)
- Division: Lightweight
- Style: Wrestling, Kickboxing
- Team: Paraestra Tokyo
- Years active: 1999 - 2006

Mixed martial arts record
- Total: 15
- Wins: 6
- By knockout: 1
- By submission: 1
- By decision: 4
- Losses: 7
- By knockout: 2
- By submission: 1
- By decision: 4
- Draws: 2

Other information
- Mixed martial arts record from Sherdog

Kohei Yasumi (born November 27, 1978) is a Japanese mixed martial artist. He competed in the Lightweight division.

== Mixed martial arts record ==
Professional record breakdown
15 matches	6 wins	7 losses
By knockout	1	2
By submission	1	1
By decision	4	4
Draws	2	

Res.	Record	Opponent	Method	Event	Date	Round	Time	Location	Notes
Loss	6–7–2	Ganjo Tentsuku	TKO (punches)	Shooto 2006: 9/8 in Korakuen Hall	September 8, 2006	1	2:46	Tokyo, Japan	
Loss	6–6–2	Jani Lax	Submission (guillotine choke)	Shooto: Wanna Shooto 2004	November 12, 2004	2	3:25	Tokyo, Japan	
Loss	6–5–2	Yoichi Fukumoto	Decision (unanimous)	Shooto 2004: 7/4 in Kitazawa Town Hall	July 4, 2004	3	5:00	Setagaya, Tokyo, Japan	
Loss	6–4–2	Kotetsu Boku	Decision (unanimous)	Shooto 2004: 1/24 in Korakuen Hall	January 24, 2004	3	5:00	Tokyo, Japan	
Loss	6–3–2	Luiz Firmino	Decision (unanimous)	Shooto: 9/5 in Korakuen Hall	September 5, 2003	3	5:00	Tokyo, Japan	
Win	6–2–2	Takeshi Yamazaki	KO (punches)	Shooto: 2/23 in Korakuen Hall	February 23, 2003	1	1:21	Tokyo, Japan	
Loss	5–2–2	Yves Edwards	KO (punch)	HOOKnSHOOT: New Wind	September 7, 2002	1	1:20	Evansville, Indiana, United States	
Win	5–1–2	Daisuke Sugie	Submission (guillotine choke)	Shooto: Gig Central 1	March 31, 2002	1	3:31	Nagoya, Aichi, Japan	
Win	4–1–2	Henry Matamoros	Decision (unanimous)	Shooto: Treasure Hunt 2	January 25, 2002	3	5:00	Setagaya, Tokyo, Japan	
Loss	3–1–2	Ryan Bow	Decision (unanimous)	Shooto: To The Top 2	March 2, 2001	3	5:00	Tokyo, Japan	
Win	3–0–2	Chikara Miyake	Decision (unanimous)	Shooto: R.E.A.D. 6	July 16, 2000	2	5:00	Tokyo, Japan	
Win	2–0–2	Yohei Nanbu	Decision (majority)	Shooto: R.E.A.D. 1	January 14, 2000	2	5:00	Tokyo, Japan	
Draw	1–0–2	Masakazu Kuramochi	Draw	Shooto: Renaxis 4	September 5, 1999	2	5:00	Tokyo, Japan	
Draw	1–0–1	Satoshi Fujisaki	Draw	Shooto: Renaxis 1	March 28, 1999	2	5:00	Tokyo, Japan	
Win	1–0	Koji Takeuchi	Decision (unanimous)	Shooto: Shooter's Soul	January 27, 1999	2	5:00	Setagaya, Tokyo, Japan	

== See also ==
- List of male mixed martial artists
