= Kazuhiro Inoue =

Japanese mixed martial artist

Kazuhiro Inoue 井上和浩
- Born: January 31, 1973 (age 53); Japan
- Nationality: Japanese
- Height: 5 ft 6 in (1.68 m)
- Weight: 154 lb (70 kg; 11.0 st)
- Division: Featherweight; Lightweight
- Team: Impress
- Years active: 1999–2005

Mixed martial arts record
- Total: 13
- Wins: 4
- By decision: 4
- Losses: 6
- By knockout: 1
- By submission: 2
- By decision: 3
- Draws: 3

Other information
- Mixed martial arts record from Sherdog

Kazuhiro Inoue Japanese: 井上和浩 (born January 31, 1973) is a Japanese mixed martial artist. He competed in the Featherweight and Lightweight divisions.

== Mixed martial arts record ==
Professional record breakdown
13 matches	4 wins	6 losses
By knockout	0	1
By submission	0	2
By decision	4	3
Draws	3	

Res.	Record	Opponent	Method	Event	Date	Round	Time	Location	Notes
Loss	4–6–3	Sotaro Yamada	Technical Submission (rear-naked choke)	Pancrase: Spiral 9	November 4, 2005	1	2:51	Tokyo, Japan	
Loss	4–5–3	Ippo Watanuki	Submission (kneebar)	Pancrase: Brave 9	October 12, 2004	2	2:51	Tokyo, Japan	
Loss	4–4–3	Stephen Palling	Decision (split)	Warriors Quest 7: Tap Out or Knock Out	August 30, 2002	3	5:00	Honolulu, Hawaii, United States	
Draw	4–3–3	Tetsuo Katsuta	Draw	Shooto: Treasure Hunt 8	July 19, 2002	3	5:00	Tokyo, Japan	
Draw	4–3–2	Naoya Uematsu	Draw	Shooto: Gig Central 1	March 31, 2002	3	5:00	Nagoya, Aichi, Japan	
Loss	4–3–1	Hiroyuki Abe	TKO (doctor stoppage)	Shooto: To The Top 10	November 25, 2001	1	4:00	Tokyo, Japan	
Loss	4–2–1	Masato Shiozawa	Decision (40-39)	GCM: The Contenders 6	October 8, 2001	2	5:00	Kanagawa, Japan	
Win	4–1–1	Flavio Santiago	Decision (unanimous)	Shooto: To The Top 8	September 2, 2001	2	5:00	Tokyo, Japan	
Draw	3–1–1	Kazuya Abe	Draw	Shooto: Gig East 1	April 28, 2001	2	5:00	Tokyo, Japan	
Win	3–1	Takeru Ueno	Decision (unanimous)	Shooto: R.E.A.D. 11	October 9, 2000	2	5:00	Setagaya, Tokyo, Japan	
Loss	2–1	Tetsuo Katsuta	Decision (unanimous)	Shooto: R.E.A.D. 7	July 22, 2000	2	5:00	Setagaya, Tokyo, Japan	
Win	2–0	Katsuya Toida	Decision (majority)	Shooto: R.E.A.D. 5	May 22, 2000	2	5:00	Tokyo, Japan	
Win	1–0	Teruyuki Hashimoto	Decision (unanimous)	Shooto: Gateway to the Extremes	November 4, 1999	2	5:00	Setagaya, Tokyo, Japan	

== See also ==
- List of male mixed martial artists
