= Satoshi Fujisaki =

Japanese mixed martial artist

Satoshi Fujisaki 藤崎聡
- Born: Japan
- Nationality: Japanese
- Weight: 154 lb (70 kg; 11.0 st)
- Division: Lightweight
- Team: Shooting Gym Yokohama
- Years active: 1998 - 1999

Mixed martial arts record
- Total: 5
- Wins: 2
- By submission: 1
- By decision: 1
- Losses: 1
- By decision: 1
- Draws: 2

Other information
- Mixed martial arts record from Sherdog

Satoshi Fujisaki (Japanese: 藤崎聡 is a Japanese mixed martial artist. He competed in the Lightweight division.

== Mixed martial arts record ==
Professional record breakdown
5 matches	2 wins	1 loss
By submission	1	0
By decision	1	1
Draws	2	

Res.	Record	Opponent	Method	Event	Date	Round	Time	Location	Notes
Win	2–1–2	Makoto Ishikawa	Decision (unanimous)	Shooto: Shooter's Passion	May 27, 1999	2	5:00	Setagaya, Tokyo, Japan	
Draw	1–1–2	Kohei Yasumi	Draw	Shooto: Renaxis 1	March 28, 1999	2	5:00	Tokyo, Japan	
Win	1–1–1	Kyuhei Ueno	Submission (armbar)	Shooto: Shooter's Dream	September 18, 1998	1	2:23	Setagaya, Tokyo, Japan	
Loss	0–1–1	Kazumichi Takada	Decision (unanimous)	Shooto: Gig '98 1st	April 10, 1998	2	5:00	Tokyo, Japan	
Draw	0–0–1	Dokonjonosuke Mishima	Draw	Shooto: Las Grandes Viajes 1	January 17, 1998	2	5:00	Tokyo, Japan	

== See also ==
- List of male mixed martial artists
