= Jinzaburo Yonezawa =

Japanese mixed martial artist

- Born: October 26, 1977 (age 48); Japan
- Nationality: Japanese
- Height: 5 ft 7 in (1.70 m)
- Weight: 154 lb (70 kg; 11.0 st)
- Division: Lightweight
- Team: Gracie Barra Tokyo
- Years active: 1999 - 2007

Mixed martial arts record
- Total: 7
- Wins: 1
- By submission: 1
- Losses: 5
- By submission: 2
- By decision: 3
- Draws: 1

Other information
- Mixed martial arts record from Sherdog

Jinzaburo Yonezawa (born October 26, 1977) is a Japanese mixed martial artist. He competed in the Lightweight division.

== Mixed martial arts record ==
Professional record breakdown
| 7 matches | 1 win | 5 losses |
| By submission | 1 | 2 |
| By decision | 0 | 3 |
| Draws | 1 | |

| Res. | Record | Opponent | Method | Event | Date | Round | Time | Location | Notes |
|---|---|---|---|---|---|---|---|---|---|
| Loss | 1–5–1 | Yuichi Ikari | Decision (unanimous) | Pancrase: 2007 Neo-Blood Tournament Eliminations | March 25, 2007 | 2 | 5:00 | Tokyo, Japan | |
| Loss | 1–4–1 | Kenji Takeshige | Technical Submission (arm-triangle choke) | Pancrase: Rising 1 | February 4, 2007 | 1 | 4:27 | Osaka, Japan | |
| Loss | 1–3–1 | Taku Aramaki | Submission (triangle armbar) | GCM: Demolition 060730 | July 30, 2006 | 2 | 2:53 | Tokyo, Japan | |
| Win | 1–2–1 | Atsuo Hirano | Submission (rear-naked choke) | Pancrase: 2006 Neo-Blood Tournament Semifinals | April 2, 2006 | 2 | 4:19 | Tokyo, Japan | |
| Loss | 0–2–1 | Takashi Ochi | Decision (majority) | Shooto: R.E.A.D. 11 | October 9, 2000 | 2 | 5:00 | Setagaya, Tokyo, Japan | |
| Loss | 0–1–1 | Makoto Ishikawa | Decision (unanimous) | Shooto: R.E.A.D. 1 | January 14, 2000 | 2 | 5:00 | Tokyo, Japan | |
| Draw | 0–0–1 | Chikara Miyake | Draw | Shooto: Shooter's Soul | January 27, 1999 | 2 | 5:00 | Setagaya, Tokyo, Japan | |

== See also ==
- List of male mixed martial artists
