= Naoya Uematsu =

Japanese mixed martial arts fighter

- Born: 10 September 1978 (age 48); Japan
- Nationality: Japanese
- Height: 5 ft 4 in (1.63 m)
- Weight: 143 lb (65 kg; 10.2 st)
- Division: Bantamweight; Featherweight; Lightweight
- Style: Judo, Sambo, Muay Thai, Brazilian Jiu-Jitsu
- Team: K'z Factory; Crosspoint Gym; NEXUSENSE
- Teachers: Kazuhiro Kusayanagi; Yohei Suzuki
- Rank: Black Belt in Brazilian Jiu-Jitsu; 3rd Dan Black Belt in Judo; Master of Sport in Sambo
- Years active: 1997–2008

Mixed martial arts record
- Total: 25
- Wins: 15
- By knockout: 1
- By submission: 11
- By decision: 3
- Losses: 8
- By knockout: 4
- By decision: 4
- Draws: 2

Other information
- Mixed martial arts record from Sherdog

Naoya Uematsu (born 10 September 1978) is a retired Japanese mixed martial artist who competed in the bantamweight, featherweight and lightweight divisions in Cage Force, DEEP and Shooto. He is the head instructor of the NEXUSENSE gym. In addition, Uematsu is a director and referee director of the Japan Brazilian Jiu-Jitsu Federation (JBJJF). He is a director and strengthening committee member of the Japan Sambo Federation and chairman of the refereeing committee and the vice Chairman of the Japan MMA Refereeing Organization (JMOC).

== Mixed martial arts career ==
Uematsu began studying Judo at the age of 12 in middle school. He started training in Shooto at Gym K'z Factory under Kazuhiro Kusayanagi when he was 16 and immediately became an undefeated champion in competitions. He also trained in Sambo and Muay Thai at the Crosspoint Gym. He is a Brazilian Jiu-Jitsu black belt with training under Biviano Fernandez and Leonardo Vieira.

=== Early career ===
Uematsu debuted in the Lumax Cup lightweight tournament in 1997 defeating Takashi Ochi and Mitsuo Matsumoto. He made it to the finals, where he defeated Caol Uno via achilles lock under twenty three seconds in the first round.

=== Shooto ===
Uematsu would rack up an undefeated 11–0–2 record in 6 years in Shooto defeating luminaries such as Katsuya Toida and Noboru Asahi. His streak came to an end on 16 September 2002 on a loss to Bao Quach at Shooto: Treasure Hunt 10. Uematsu faced Joao Roque on 24 January 2003, losing via unanimous decision. Uematsu would go on to face Jens Pulver, Gilbert Melendez and Hideki Kadowaki later in his Shooto career. He left Shooto in 2006 at a record of 14–5–2, following a loss to Kenji Osawa.

=== Later career ===
Uematsu would go 1–3–0 in the final two years of his mixed martial arts career, with losses to Urijah Faber and Marcos Galvao. His only win was over James Doolan at Cage Force, via heel hook. He retired in 2008, following a loss to Daiki Hata at Deep: 39 Impact.

== Championships and accomplishments ==
=== Mixed martial arts ===
- All Japan Amateur Shooto
  - All Japan Amateur Shooto Tournament Runner-up (1996)
- Lumax Cup
  - Tournament of J Lightweight Tournament (1997)

=== Sambo ===
- All Japan Sambo Championships
  - All Japan Sambo Championship, Senior 68 kg, 2nd place (1998)
  - All Japan Sambo Championship, Senior 68 kg, 3rd place (2002)
  - All Japan Sambo Championship, 68 kg class champion (2008)

=== Submission wrestling ===
- ADCC
  - ADCC JAPAN TRIAL Under 66 kg champion (2007)

== Mixed martial arts record ==
Professional record breakdown
| 25 matches | 15 wins | 8 losses |
| By knockout | 1 | 4 |
| By submission | 11 | 0 |
| By decision | 3 | 4 |
| Draws | 2 | |

| Res. | Record | Opponent | Method | Event | Date | Round | Time | Location | Notes |
|---|---|---|---|---|---|---|---|---|---|
| Loss | 15–8–2 | Daiki Hata | TKO (punches) | Deep: 39 Impact | 10 December 2008 | 1 | 2:30 | Tokyo, Japan | |
| Win | 15–7–2 | James Doolan | Submission (heel hook) | GCM: Cage Force 6 | 5 April 2008 | 1 | 2:26 | Tokyo, Japan | |
| Loss | 14–7–2 | Marcos Galvao | Decision (unanimous) | Fury FC 1: Warlords Unleashed | 27 September 2006 | 3 | 5:00 | São Paulo, Brazil | |
| Loss | 14–6–2 | Urijah Faber | TKO (punches) | GC 51: Madness at the Memorial | 1 July 2006 | 2 | 3:35 | Sacramento, California, United States | |
| Loss | 14–5–2 | Kenji Osawa | Decision (majority) | Shooto: The Victory of the Truth | 17 February 2006 | 3 | 5:00 | Tokyo, Japan | |
| Loss | 14–4–2 | Gilbert Melendez | TKO (cut) | Shooto: 5/4 in Korakuen Hall | 4 May 2005 | 2 | 4:30 | Tokyo, Japan | |
| Win | 14–3–2 | Hideki Kadowaki | Technical Submission (guillotine choke) | Shooto: Shooto Junkie Is Back! | 27 June 2004 | 1 | 0:45 | Chiba, Japan | |
| Loss | 13–3–2 | Jens Pulver | KO (punch) | Shooto: 3/22 in Korakuen Hall | 22 March 2004 | 1 | 2:09 | Tokyo, Japan | |
| Win | 13–2–2 | Katsuya Toida | Submission (achilles lock) | Shooto: Wanna Shooto 2003 | 3 November 2003 | 1 | 4:06 | Tokyo, Japan | |
| Win | 12–2–2 | Jin Kazeta | Submission (armbar) | Shooto: 7/13 in Korakuen Hall | 13 July 2003 | 1 | 1:38 | Tokyo, Japan | |
| Loss | 11–2–2 | Joao Roque | Decision (unanimous) | Shooto: 1/24 in Korakuen Hall | 24 January 2003 | 3 | 5:00 | Tokyo, Japan | |
| Loss | 11–1–2 | Bao Quach | Decision (unanimous) | Shooto: Treasure Hunt 10 | 16 September 2002 | 2 | 5:00 | Yokohama, Kanagawa, Japan | |
| Draw | 11–0–2 | Kazuhiro Inoue | Draw | Shooto: Gig Central 1 | 31 March 2002 | 3 | 5:00 | Nagoya, Aichi, Japan | |
| Win | 11–0–1 | Mike Cardoso | Decision (unanimous) | Shooto: To The Top 1 | 19 January 2001 | 3 | 5:00 | Tokyo, Japan | |
| Win | 10–0–1 | Noboru Asahi | Decision (majority) | Shooto: R.E.A.D. 10 | 15 September 2000 | 3 | 5:00 | Tokyo, Japan | |
| Win | 9–0–1 | Joey Gilbert | Submission (achilles lock) | Shooto: R.E.A.D. 6 | 16 July 2000 | 2 | 3:22 | Tokyo, Japan | |
| Win | 8–0–1 | Kimihito Nonaka | Technical Submission (armbar) | Shooto: Renaxis 4 | 5 September 1999 | 3 | 3:11 | Tokyo, Japan | |
| Win | 7–0–1 | Ryan Diaz | Submission (achilles lock) | SB 12: SuperBrawl 12 | 1 June 1999 | 1 | 1:51 | Honolulu, Hawaii, United States | |
| Win | 6–0–1 | Eric Payne | Submission (heel hook) | Shooto: Gig '99 | 9 April 1999 | 1 | 0:16 | Tokyo, Japan | |
| Win | 5–0–1 | Mamoru Okochi | TKO (punches) | Shooto: Shooter's Soul | 27 January 1999 | 2 | 1:22 | Setagaya, Tokyo, Japan | |
| Draw | 4–0–1 | Kimihito Nonaka | Draw | Shooto: Las Grandes Viajes 6 | 27 November 1998 | 2 | 5:00 | Tokyo, Japan | |
| Win | 4–0 | Katsuya Toida | Submission (armbar) | Shooto: Shooter's Dream | 18 September 1998 | 1 | 2:46 | Setagaya, Tokyo, Japan | |
| Win | 3–0 | Caol Uno | Submission (achilles lock) | Lumax Cup: Tournament of J '97 Lightweight Tournament | 20 December 1997 | 1 | 0:23 | Japan | |
| Win | 2–0 | Mitsuo Matsumoto | Decision (unanimous) | Lumax Cup: Tournament of J '97 Lightweight Tournament | 20 December 1997 | 2 | 3:00 | Japan | |
| Win | 1–0 | Takashi Ochi | Submission (heel hook) | Lumax Cup: Tournament of J '97 Lightweight Tournament | 20 December 1997 | 1 | 2:18 | Japan | |

== See also ==
- List of male mixed martial artists
