= Takumi Nakayama =

Japanese mixed martial artist

- Born: November 11, 1973 (age 52); Osaka, Japan
- Native name: 中山 巧
- Other names: Da Japanese Ironman; Takumi(タクミ); Ushi shooter(うしシューター)
- Nationality: Japanese
- Height: 5 ft 8 in (1.73 m)
- Weight: 145 lb (66 kg; 10.4 st)
- Division: Lightweight(2000 - 2010); Featherweight(2011 - current)
- Team: Paraestra Osaka
- Rank: 3rd Dan Black Belt in Judo; Black Belt in Brazilian Jiu-Jitsu

Mixed martial arts record
- Total: 42
- Wins: 19
- By knockout: 1
- By submission: 7
- By decision: 11
- Losses: 16
- By knockout: 7
- By submission: 2
- By decision: 7
- Draws: 6
- No contests: 1

Other information
- Mixed martial arts record from Sherdog

Takumi Nakayama (Japanese: 中山巧, Nakayama Takumi; born 11 November 1973) is a Japanese mixed martial artist and former King of Pancrase Featherweight Champion. He is also the former King of the Cage Lightweight Champion.

"Takumi"(タクミ, all katakana) ring name of Nakayama in Japan.

== Biography ==
Nakayama was in second place of the Japanese Amateur Shooto Championship Welterweight in 1999 and in second place of the Japanese Combat Wrestling 69 kg weight class in 1999.

=== King of the Cage ===
Nakayama beat Charlie Kohler (USA) in KOTC 43 on November 14, 2004, and became the King of the Cage Lightweight Champion. He then lost his title to Mac Danzig on Oct 29th, 2005 in Reno, Nevada when his corner threw in the towel after he received over 20 unanswered strikes.

=== Pancrase ===
In April 2011, Nakayama cut down to the Featherweight division, and won by rear-naked choke submission against Yusuke Kawanago in Pancrase. He became the Pancrase Interim Featherweight Champion by unanimous decision, defeating Tomonari Kanomata on September 4, 2011.

On June 2, 2012, Nakayama fight the Pancrase Interim Featherweight Championship, challenger Jon Shores, who was on a 10-fight winning streak. He was knocked down many times in the punch of the shores. However, he won via rear-naked choke submission in the third round.

On August 9, 2012, Marlon Sandro vacated the Pancrase Featherweight Championship. Nakayama has been moved to its title from Pancrase Interim Featherweight Championship.

== Championships and accomplishments ==
=== Mixed martial arts ===
- King of the Cage
  - KOTC Lightweight Championship (1 Time)
- Pancrase
  - Featherweight King of Pancrase (1 Time)
  - Interim Featherweight King of Pancrase (1 Time)
  - One successful title defense

== Mixed martial arts record ==
Professional record breakdown
42 matches	19 wins	16 losses
By knockout	1	7
By submission	7	2
By decision	11	7
Draws	6	
No contests	1	

Res.	Record	Opponent	Method	Event	Date	Round	Time	Location	Notes
Loss	19–16–6 (1)	Issei Tamura	Decision (unanimous)	Pancrase: 273	December 13, 2015	3	5:00	Tokyo, Japan	
Loss	19–15–6 (1)	Nam Phan	Decision (split)	Pancrase 264	January 31, 2015	3	5:00	Tokyo, Japan	Lost the Pancrase Featherweight Championship.
Win	19–14–6 (1)	Wataru Miki	Submission (rear-naked choke)	Vale Tudo Japan: VTJ 5th in Osaka	June 28, 2014	2	2:29	Osaka, Japan	
Loss	18–14–6 (1)	Will Chope	TKO (punches)	PXC: Pacific Xtreme Combat 40	October 25, 2013	3	1:42	Mangilao, Guam	
Win	18–13–6 (1)	Johnny Pecyna	Submission (kimura)	PXC: Pacific Xtreme Combat 37	May 18, 2013	1	N/A	Pasig, Philippines	
Draw	17–13–6 (1)	Koji Oishi	Draw (majority)	Pancrase: 246	March 17, 2013	3	5:00	Tokyo, Japan	
Win	17–13–5 (1)	Jon Shores	Submission (rear-naked choke)	Pancrase: Progress Tour 7	June 2, 2012	3	2:47	Tokyo, Japan	Defended the interim Pancrase Featherweight Championship. Later promoted to undisputed champion.
Win	16–13–5 (1)	Tomonari Kanomata	Decision (unanimous)	Pancrase: Impressive Tour 9	September 4, 2011	3	5:00	Tokyo, Japan	Won the interim Pancrase Featherweight Championship.
Draw	15–13–5 (1)	Kenichi Ito	Draw	Zst: Zst 28	May 22, 2011	2	5:00	Tokyo, Japan	
Win	15–13–4 (1)	Yusuke Kawanago	Submission (rear-naked choke)	Pancrase: Impressive Tour 3	April 3, 2011	1	3:27	Tokyo, Japan	Debut at Featherweight
Win	14–13–4 (1)	Tsuneo Kimura	Decision (unanimous)	Shooto: Border: Season 2 - Immovable	December 26, 2010	2	5:00	Osaka, Japan	147.71 lb (67 kg) catchweight bout
Loss	13–13–4 (1)	Shinji Sasaki	TKO (punches)	Shooto: Gig West 12	September 26, 2010	1	3:51	Osaka, Japan	
Loss	13–12–4 (1)	Dominique Robinson	Decision (unanimous)	PFC 11: All In	November 20, 2008	3	3:00	Tokyo, Japan	
Loss	13–11–4 (1)	Eiji Mitsuoka	TKO (punches)	GCM: Cage Force 3	June 9, 2007	1	3:30	Tokyo, Japan	
NC	13–10–4 (1)	Anthony McDavitt	No Contest	No Limits: Proving Ground	April 21, 2007	1	N/A	Irvine, California, United States	
Win	13–10–4	Yoichi Fukumoto	Decision (unanimous)	GCM: Cage Force EX Western Bound	February 17, 2007	3	5:00	Tottori, Japan	
Draw	12–10–4	Wataru Takahashi	Draw	GCM: Cage Force 1	November 25, 2006	2	5:00	Tokyo, Japan	
Loss	12–10–3	Kenji Arai	KO (punch)	MARS	February 4, 2006	2	0:04	Tokyo, Japan	
Loss	12–9–3	Mac Danzig	TKO (cut)	KOTC: Execution Day	October 29, 2005	3	2:45	Reno, Nevada, United States	Lost the KOTC Lightweight Championship.
Loss	12–8–3	Hiroki Nagaoka	Decision (majority)	Deep: 19th Impact	July 8, 2005	2	5:00	Tokyo, Japan	
Loss	12–7–3	Ganjo Tentsuku	Decision (unanimous)	Shooto: 1/29 in Korakuen Hall	January 29, 2005	3	5:00	Tokyo, Japan	
Win	12–6–3	Charlie Kohler	TKO (punches)	KOTC 44: Revenge	November 14, 2004	2	2:35	San Jacinto, California, United States	Won the vacant KOTC Lightweight Championship.
Win	11–6–3	Charles Bennett	Submission (rear-naked choke)	KOTC 39: Hitmaster	August 6, 2004	1	2:46	San Jacinto, California, United States	
Loss	10–6–3	Ryan Bow	Decision (majority)	Shooto: 7/16 in Korakuen Hall	July 16, 2004	3	5:00	Tokyo, Japan	
Win	10–5–3	Takashi Nakakura	Decision (unanimous)	Shooto 2004: 4/11 in Osaka Prefectural Gymnasium	April 11, 2004	3	5:00	Osaka, Japan	
Loss	9–5–3	Marcus Aurélio	Submission (armbar)	ZST	November 23, 2003	1	3:05	Tokyo, Japan	
Loss	9–4–3	Tatsuya Kawajiri	TKO (punches)	Shooto - Shooter's Dream 2	May 30, 2003	1	3:44	Tokyo, Japan	
Loss	9–3–3	Joachim Hansen	Decision (majority)	Shooto: Year End Show 2002	December 14, 2002	3	5:00	Tokyo, Japan	
Draw	9–2–3	Rumina Sato	Draw	Shooto: Treasure Hunt 11	November 15, 2002	3	5:00	Tokyo, Japan	
Win	9–2–2	Takeshi Yamazaki	Decision (unanimous)	Shooto: Gig East 10	August 27, 2002	3	5:00	Tokyo, Japan	
Loss	8–2–2	Vítor Ribeiro	Submission (arm-triangle choke)	HOOKnSHOOT: Relentless	May 25, 2002	1	0:51	Evansville, Indiana, United States	
Loss	8–1–2	Marcio Barbosa	TKO (guillotine choke)	Shooto: To The Top Final Act	December 16, 2001	1	0:32	Tokyo, Japan	
Win	8–0–2	Henry Matamoros	Submission (exhaustion)	HOOKnSHOOT: Kings 1	November 17, 2001	3	3:30	Evansville, Indiana, United States	
Win	7–0–2	Bruno Queroy	Decision (unanimous)	Shooto: To The Top 8	September 2, 2001	2	5:00	Tokyo, Japan	
Win	6–0–2	Takaharu Murahama	Technical Decision (unanimous)	Shooto: GIG East 4	July 27, 2001	2	2:45	Tokyo, Japan	
Win	5–0–2	Charlie Pearson	Decision (majority)	Shooto: To The Top 5	June 30, 2001	2	5:00	Tokyo, Japan	
Win	4–0–2	Ian James Schaffa	Decision (unanimous)	Shooto: To The Top 3	March 21, 2001	2	5:00	Tokyo, Japan	
Win	3–0–2	Chikara Miyake	Decision (unanimous)	Shooto: GIG West 1	February 18, 2001	2	5:00	Osaka, Japan	
Draw	2–0–2	Yohei Nanbu	Draw	Shooto: R.E.A.D. 12	November 12, 2000	2	5:00	Tokyo, Japan	
Win	2–0–1	Takuhito Hida	Decision (majority)	Shooto: R.E.A.D. 10	September 15, 2000	2	5:00	Tokyo, Japan	
Draw	1–0–1	Koji Takeuchi	Draw	Shooto: R.E.A.D. 6	July 16, 2000	2	5:00	Tokyo, Japan	
Win	1–0	Tatsuya Kawajiri	Submission (rear-naked choke)	Shooto" R.E.A.D. 4	April 12, 2000	1	2:44	Tokyo, Japan	

== Submission grappling record ==
Result	Record	Opponent	Method	Event	Date	Round	Time	Location	Notes
Loss	0–1	(South Korea) Soo Chul Kim & Yoon Jun Lee	Submission (Guillotine choke)	ROAD FC 057	December 14, 2019	Ext	1:14	Seoul, South Korea	Japan vs. South Korea team Submission wrestling match. Teamed up with Shunichi Shimizu. Yoon Jun Lee faced Shimizu in the 1st match and Nakayama faced Soo Chul Kim in the 2nd match, both ending in a 5-minute time-limit draw. In the extension round, Shimizu stepped up again but was defeated by Soo Chul Kim via submission.

== See also ==
- List of current mixed martial arts champions
- List of male mixed martial artists

Preceded by Charlie Kohler	King of the Cage Light Weight champion 14 November 2004 - 29 October 2005	Succeeded by Mac Danzig
