= 1999 in Shooto =

Mixed martial arts events

Information
- First date: January 15, 1999
- Last date: November 4, 1999

Events
- Total events: 12

Fights
- Total fights: 86
- Title fights: 3

Chronology
1998 in Shooto	1999 in Shooto	2000 in Shooto

The year 1999 is the 11th year in the history of Shooto, a mixed martial arts promotion based in the Japan. In 1999 Shooto held 12 events beginning with, Shooto: Devilock Fighters.

== Title fights ==
Title fights in 1999
Weight class				Method	Round	Time	Event	Notes
Featherweight	Noboru Asahi (c)	vs.	Uchu Tatsumi	Draw	3	5:00	Shooto: Renaxis 1	(Note: For The Featherweight Champion.)
Lightweight	Caol Uno	def.	Rumina Sato	Submission (Rear-Naked Choke)	3	4:02	Shooto: 10th Anniversary Event	(Note: For The Lightweight Champion.)
Featherweight	Alexandre Franca Nogueira	def.	Noboru Asahi (c)	Technical Submission (Guillotine Choke)	2	3:29	Shooto: Renaxis 4	(Note: For The Featherweight Champion.)

== Events list ==
#	Event title	Date	Arena	Location
69	Shooto: Gateway to the Extremes	November 4, 1999	Kitazawa Town Hall	Setagaya, Tokyo, Japan
68	Shooto: Renaxis 5	October 29, 1999	Namihaya Dome	Kadoma, Osaka, Japan
67	Shooto: Shooter's Ambition	October 6, 1999	Kitazawa Town Hall	Setagaya, Tokyo, Japan
66	Shooto: Renaxis 4	September 5, 1999	Korakuen Hall	Tokyo, Japan
65	Shooto: Renaxis 3	August 4, 1999	Kitazawa Town Hall	Setagaya, Tokyo, Japan
64	Shooto: Renaxis 2	July 16, 1999	Korakuen Hall	Tokyo, Japan
63	Shooto: 10th Anniversary Event	May 29, 1999	Yokohama Cultural Gymnasium	Yokohama, Kanagawa, Japan
62	Shooto: Shooter's Passion	May 27, 1999	Kitazawa Town Hall	Setagaya, Tokyo, Japan
61	Shooto: Gig '99	April 9, 1999	Kitazawa Town Hall	Tokyo, Japan
60	Shooto: Renaxis 1	March 28, 1999	Korakuen Hall	Tokyo, Japan
59	Shooto: Shooter's Soul	January 27, 1999	Kitazawa Town Hall	Setagaya, Tokyo, Japan
58	Shooto: Devilock Fighters	January 15, 1999	Korakuen Hall	Tokyo, Japan

== Shooto: Devilock Fighters ==
Shooto: Devilock Fighters was an event held on January 15, 1999, at The Korakuen Hall in Tokyo, Japan.

=== Results ===
Main Card
Weight class				Method	Round	Time	Notes
	Rumina Sato	def.	Charles Diaz	Submission (Flying Armbar)	1	0:06
	Hayato Sakurai	def.	Ademir Oliveira	KO (Flying Knee)	1	0:34
	Akihiro Gono	vs.	Marcos da Silva	Draw	3	5:00
	Takanori Gomi	def.	Kazumichi Takada	TKO (Punches)	2	3:42
	Makoto Ishikawa	def.	Mitsuo Matsumoto	Decision (Unanimous)	2	5:00

== Shooto: Shooter's Soul ==
Shooto: Shooter's Soul was an event held on January 27, 1999, at Kitazawa Town Hall in Setagaya, Tokyo, Japan.

=== Results ===
Main Card
Weight class				Method	Round	Time	Notes
	Naoya Uematsu	def.	Mamoru Okochi	TKO (Punches)	2	1:22
	Ryuta Sakurai	def.	Nobuhiro Tsurumaki	TKO (Cut)	1	0:54
	Takayuki Okochi	vs.	Norio Fujita	Draw	2	5:00
	Yoshinobu Ota	def.	Hiroaki Yoshioka	Decision (Majority)	2	5:00
	Kohei Yasumi	def.	Koji Takeuchi	Decision (Unanimous)	2	5:00
	Chikara Miyake	def.	Jinzaburo Yonezawa	Draw	2	5:00
	Fumio Usami	def.	Teruyuki Hashimoto	TKO (Punches)	2	0:46
	Kazuya Abe	def.	Yohei Nanbu	Decision (Unanimous)	2	5:00

== Shooto: Renaxis 1 ==
Shooto: Renaxis 1 was an event held on March 28, 1999, at The Korakuen Hall in Tokyo, Japan.

=== Results ===
Main Card
Weight class				Method	Round	Time	Notes
Featherweight	Noboru Asahi (c)	vs.	Uchu Tatsumi	Draw	3	5:00	(Note: For The Featherweight Champion.)
	Alexandre Franca Nogueira	def.	Masahiro Oishi	Submission (Armbar)	1	3:11
	Takanori Gomi	def.	Takuya Kuwabara	Decision (Unanimous)	3	5:00
	Kohei Sato	def.	Anthony Netzler	Decision (Unanimous)	2	5:00
	Kohei Yasumi	vs.	Satoshi Fujisaki	Draw	2	5:00
	Kazuya Abe	def.	Koji Takeuchi	Decision (Unanimous)	2	5:00

== Shooto: Gig '99 ==
Shooto: Gig '99 was an event held on April 9, 1999, at Kitazawa Town Hall in Tokyo, Japan.

=== Results ===
Main Card
Weight class				Method	Round	Time	Notes
	Naoya Uematsu	def.	Eric Payne	Submission (Heel Hook)	1	0:16
	Takeyasu Hirono	vs.	Jin Akimoto	Draw	2	5:00
	Izuru Takeuchi	def.	Nobuhiro Tsurumaki	Decision (Unanimous)	2	5:00
	Shuichiro Katsumura	def.	Masaki Nishizawa	Decision (Unanimous)	2	5:00
	Katsuya Toida	def.	Tetsuo Katsuta	Decision (Unanimous)	2	5:00

== Shooto: Shooter's Passion ==
Shooto: Shooter's Passion was an event held on May 27, 1999, at Kitazawa Town Hall in Setagaya, Tokyo, Japan.

=== Results ===
Main Card
Weight class				Method	Round	Time	Notes
	Yuki Sasaki	def.	Ryuta Sakurai	Submission (Heel Hook)	1	2:00
	Satoshi Fujisaki	def.	Makoto Ishikawa	Decision (Unanimous)	2	5:00
	Saburo Kawakatsu	def.	Takayuki Okochi	Decision (Unanimous)	2	5:00
	Isao Tanimura	def.	Koichi Tanaka	Decision (Majority)	2	5:00
	Mitsuhiro Sakamoto	vs.	Norio Nishiyama	Draw	2	5:00
	Dokonjonosuke Mishima	def.	Hiroki Kotani	Submission (Rear Naked Choke)	1	4:00
	Koji Takeuchi	def.	Mitsuo Matsumoto	Submission (Triangle Choke)	2	1:30
	Hiromichi Maruyama	vs.	Yohei Nanbu	Draw	2	5:00

== Shooto: 10th Anniversary Event ==
Shooto: 10th Anniversary Event was an event held on May 29, 1999, at The Yokohama Cultural Gymnasium in Yokohama, Kanagawa, Japan.

=== Results ===
Main Card
Weight class				Method	Round	Time	Notes
Lightweight	Caol Uno	def.	Rumina Sato	Submission (Rear-Naked Choke)	3	4:02	(Note: For The Lightweight Champion.)
	Hayato Sakurai	def.	Marcelo Aguiar	Decision (Unanimous)	3	5:00
	Carlos Newton	def.	Kenji Kawaguchi	Submission (Armbar)	1	5:00
	Tetsuji Kato	def.	Jutaro Nakao	Decision (Unanimous)	3	5:00
	Matt Hughes	def.	Akihiro Gono	Decision (Unanimous)	3	5:00
	Dave Menne	def.	Dennis Hallman	Decision (Unanimous)	3	5:00
	Izuru Takeuchi	def.	Ahmed Lazizi	Decision (Unanimous)	2	5:00
	Hiroyuki Abe	def.	Yoshiyuki Takayama	Decision (Unanimous)	2	5:00

== Shooto: Renaxis 2 ==
Shooto: Renaxis 2 was an event held on July 16, 1999, at The Korakuen Hall in Tokyo, Japan.

=== Results ===
Main Card
Weight class				Method	Round	Time	Notes
	Hayato Sakurai	def.	Brad Aird	Submission (Armbar)	1	0:37
	Larry Papadopoulos	def.	Yuki Sasaki	Decision (Unanimous)	3	5:00
	Takuya Kuwabara	def.	John Paun	TKO (Punches)	2	2:09
	Kohei Sato	def.	Katsuhisa Fujii	TKO (Punches)	1	4:05
	Isao Tanimura	def.	Tomoaki Hayama	Decision (Majority)	2	5:00
	Takuya Wada	def.	Saburo Kawakatsu	Decision (Majority)	2	5:00
	Mamoru Yamaguchi	def.	Shuichiro Katsumura	Decision (Unanimous)	2	5:00

== Shooto: Renaxis 3 ==
Shooto: Renaxis 3 was an event held on August 4, 1999, at Kitazawa Town Hall in Setagaya, Tokyo, Japan.

=== Results ===
Main Card
Weight class				Method	Round	Time	Notes
	Takenori Ito	def.	Kazuya Abe	Decision (Majority)	2	5:00
	Dokonjonosuke Mishima	def.	Makoto Ishikawa	Decision (Unanimous)	2	5:00
	Jun Kitagawa	def.	Ryuta Sakurai	Decision (Unanimous)	2	5:00
	Takaharu Murahama	def.	Yohei Suzuki	Decision (Unanimous)	2	5:00
	Yoshinobu Ota	def.	Norio Nishiyama	Decision (Unanimous)	2	5:00
	Yohei Nanbu	def.	Koichi Tanaka	Decision (Majority)	2	5:00
	Mitsuo Matsumoto	def.	Shinsuke Ueno	Decision (Unanimous)	2	5:00
	Tetsuharu Ikei	def.	Hiroki Kotani	KO (Punch)	1	0:35

== Shooto: Renaxis 4 ==
Shooto: Renaxis 4 was an event held on September 5, 1999, at The Korakuen Hall in Tokyo, Japan.

=== Results ===
Main Card
Weight class				Method	Round	Time	Notes
	Takanori Gomi	def.	Takuya Kuwabara	Decision (Unanimous)	3	5:00
Featherweight	Alexandre Franca Nogueira	def.	Noboru Asahi (c)	Technical Submission (Guillotine Choke)	2	3:29	(Note: For The Featherweight Champion.)
	Caol Uno	def.	Din Thomas	Submission (Rear-Naked Choke)	3	3:16
	Uchu Tatsumi	def.	Hisao Ikeda	Decision (Split)	3	5:00
	Naoya Uematsu	def.	Kimihito Nonaka	Technical Submission (Armbar)	3	3:11
	Masahiro Oishi	vs.	Hiroyuki Abe	Draw	2	5:00
	Mamoru Yamaguchi	def.	Jin Akimoto	Decision (Majority)	2	5:00
	Takeyasu Hirono	def.	Masaru Gokita	Decision (Unanimous)	2	5:00
	Kohei Yasumi	vs.	Masakazu Kuramochi	Draw	2	5:00

== Shooto: Shooter's Ambition ==
Shooto: Shooter's Ambition was an event held on October 6, 1999, at Kitazawa Town Hall in Setagaya, Tokyo, Japan.

=== Results ===
Main Card
Weight class				Method	Round	Time	Notes
	Hiroyuki Kojima	vs.	Takaharu Murahama	Draw	2	5:00
	Tetsuharu Ikei	vs.	Koji Takeuchi	Draw	2	5:00
	Yohei Nanbu	def.	Yohei Suzuki	Decision (Unanimous)	2	5:00
	Fumio Usami	def.	Masashi Kameda	Decision (Unanimous)	2	5:00
	Norio Nishiyama	def.	Hiroki Kita	Decision (Unanimous)	2	5:00
	Shiko Yamashita	def.	Ryota Ibaraki	Submission (Armbar)	1	2:15
	Hiroshi Umemura	def.	Takeru Ueno	Decision (Split)	2	5:00

== Shooto: Renaxis 5 ==
Shooto: Renaxis 5 was an event held on October 29, 1999, at The Namihaya Dome in Kadoma, Osaka, Japan.

=== Results ===
Main Card
Weight class				Method	Round	Time	Notes
	Rumina Sato	def.	Phil Johns	Submission (Toe Hold)	1	0:54
	Masanori Suda	def.	Martijn de Jong	Submission (Punches)	2	4:44
	Jutaro Nakao	def.	Rafles la Rose	Submission (Triangle Choke)	1	2:17
	Dokonjonosuke Mishima	def.	Kazuya Abe	Decision (Unanimous)	2	5:00
	Seichi Ikemoto	def.	Isao Tanimura	Decision (Unanimous)	2	5:00
	Masaya Inoue	def.	Jun Kitagawa	Decision (Unanimous)	2	5:00
	Chikara Miyake	def.	Koichi Tanaka	Submission (Rear Naked Choke)	1	2:16

== Shooto: Gateway to the Extremes ==
Shooto: Gateway to the Extremes was an event held on November 4, 1999, at Kitazawa Town Hall in Setagaya, Tokyo, Japan.

=== Results ===
Main Card
Weight class				Method	Round	Time	Notes
	Mamoru Yamaguchi	def.	Ryan Diaz	Submission (Armbar)	2	3:35
	Izuru Takeuchi	vs.	Ryuta Sakurai	Draw	2	5:00
	Mamoru Okochi	vs.	Yoshiyuki Takayama	Draw	2	5:00
	Jin Akimoto	def.	Yoshinobu Ota	Decision (Unanimous)	2	5:00
	Kazuhiro Inoue	def.	Teruyuki Hashimoto	Decision (Unanimous)	2	5:00
	Mitsuo Matsumoto	def.	Kieran Hewett	Decision (Unanimous)	2	5:00
	Masaki Nishizawa	vs.	Daiji Takahashi	Draw	2	5:00
	Tetsuo Katsuta	def.	Tatsuya Sakurai	Submission (Rear Naked Choke)	2	3:33

== See also ==
- Shooto
- List of Shooto champions
- List of Shooto Events
