= Hiroshi Umemura (fighter) =

Japanese mixed martial arts fighter

- Born: February 22, 1972 (age 54); Japan
- Nationality: Japanese
- Height: 5 ft 7 in (1.70 m)
- Weight: 132 lb (60 kg; 9.4 st)
- Division: Bantamweight; Featherweight
- Team: Nex Sports
- Years active: 1989 - 1998

Mixed martial arts record
- Total: 22
- Wins: 11
- By knockout: 3
- By submission: 6
- By decision: 2
- Losses: 8
- By submission: 5
- By decision: 3
- Draws: 3

Other information
- Mixed martial arts record from Sherdog

Hiroshi Umemura (born February 22, 1972) is a Japanese mixed martial artist. He competed in the Bantamweight and Featherweight division.

== Mixed martial arts record ==
Professional record breakdown
22 matches	11 wins	8 losses
By knockout	3	0
By submission	6	5
By decision	2	3
Draws	3	

Res.	Record	Opponent	Method	Event	Date	Round	Time	Location	Notes
Loss	11-8-3	Masakazu Imanari	Submission (heel hook)	Deep: 37 Impact	August 17, 2008	1	0:29	Tokyo, Japan	
Win	11-7-3	Kunihiro Watanabe	Submission (rear naked choke)	Deep: clubDeep Nagoya: MB3z Impact, All Stand Up	June 29, 2008	1	1:19	Nagoya, Aichi, Japan	
Win	10-7-3	Seo Su In	Submission (rear-naked choke)	Heat: Heat 4	August 11, 2007	1	1:52	Nagoya, Aichi, Japan	
Win	9-7-3	Takamaro Watari	Submission (rear naked choke)	Shooto: Gig Central 12	March 25, 2007	1	2:03	Nagoya, Aichi, Japan	
Win	8-7-3	Shinobu Aoyama	TKO (punches)	Deep: clubDeep Toyama: Barbarian Festival 5	November 19, 2006	2	0:39	Toyama, Japan	
Win	7-7-3	Alexandre Shevtsov	TKO (punches)	Shooto: Gig Central 10	September 17, 2006	1	1:05	Nagoya, Aichi, Japan	
Win	6-7-3	Yuichiro Shirai	Submission (rear naked choke)	Deep: clubDeep Nagoya: MB3z Impact, Di Entrare	May 21, 2006	1	4:07	Tokyo	
Win	5-7-3	Manabu Kano	Submission (rear naked choke)	Shooto: Gig Central 8	July 3, 2005	1	3:01	Tokyo, Japan	
Win	4-7-3	Ryuichi Nozawa	Submission (rear-naked choke)	Deep: clubDeep Toyama: Barbarian Festival 2	May 15, 2005	1	1:34	Toyama, Japan	
Draw	3-7-3	Motoyuki Takinishi	Draw	Deep: Hero 1	April 17, 2005	2	5:00	Tokyo	
Loss	3-7-2	Kenji Osawa	Decision (unanimous)	Shooto: Gig Central 6	September 12, 2004	2	5:00	Nagoya, Aichi, Japan	
Loss	3-6-2	Yoshiro Maeda	Submission (armbar)	Deep: 14th Impact	April 18, 2004	1	2:26	Osaka	
Loss	3-5-2	Hiroyuki Tanaka	Submission (triangle choke)	Shooto: Gig Central 4	September 21, 2003	2	4:21	Nagoya, Aichi, Japan	
Win	3-4-2	Hiroki Kita	Decision (unanimous)	Shooto: Gig Central 3	March 30, 2003	2	5:00	Nagoya, Aichi, Japan	
Draw	2-4-2	Seiji Ozuka	Draw	Shooto: Gig East 7	November 26, 2001	2	5:00	Tokyo, Japan	
Loss	2-4-1	Ryota Matsune	Decision (unanimous)	Shooto: Gig East 5	August 15, 2001	2	5:00	Tokyo, Japan	
Loss	2-3-1	Daiji Takahashi	Submission (rear-naked choke)	Shooto: Gig East 2	May 22, 2001	2	3:51	Tokyo, Japan	
Draw	2-2-1	Masashi Kameda	Draw	Shooto: Gig West 1	February 18, 2001	2	5:00	Osaka, Japan	
Loss	2-2	Katsuya Toida	Submission (armbar)	Shooto: R.E.A.D. 12	November 12, 2000	1	2:07	Tokyo, Japan	
Loss	2-1	Tetsuo Katsuta	Decision (unanimous)	Shooto: R.E.A.D. 10	September 15, 2000	2	5:00	Tokyo, Japan	
Win	2-0	Fumio Usami	TKO (punches)	Shooto: R.E.A.D. 3	April 2, 2000	1	2:03	Kadoma, Osaka, Japan	
Win	1-0	Takeru Ueno	Decision (split)	Shooto: Shooter's Ambition	October 6, 1999	2	5:00	Setagaya, Tokyo, Japan	

== See also ==
- List of male mixed martial artists
