= Nobuhiro Tsurumaki =

Japanese mixed martial arts fighter

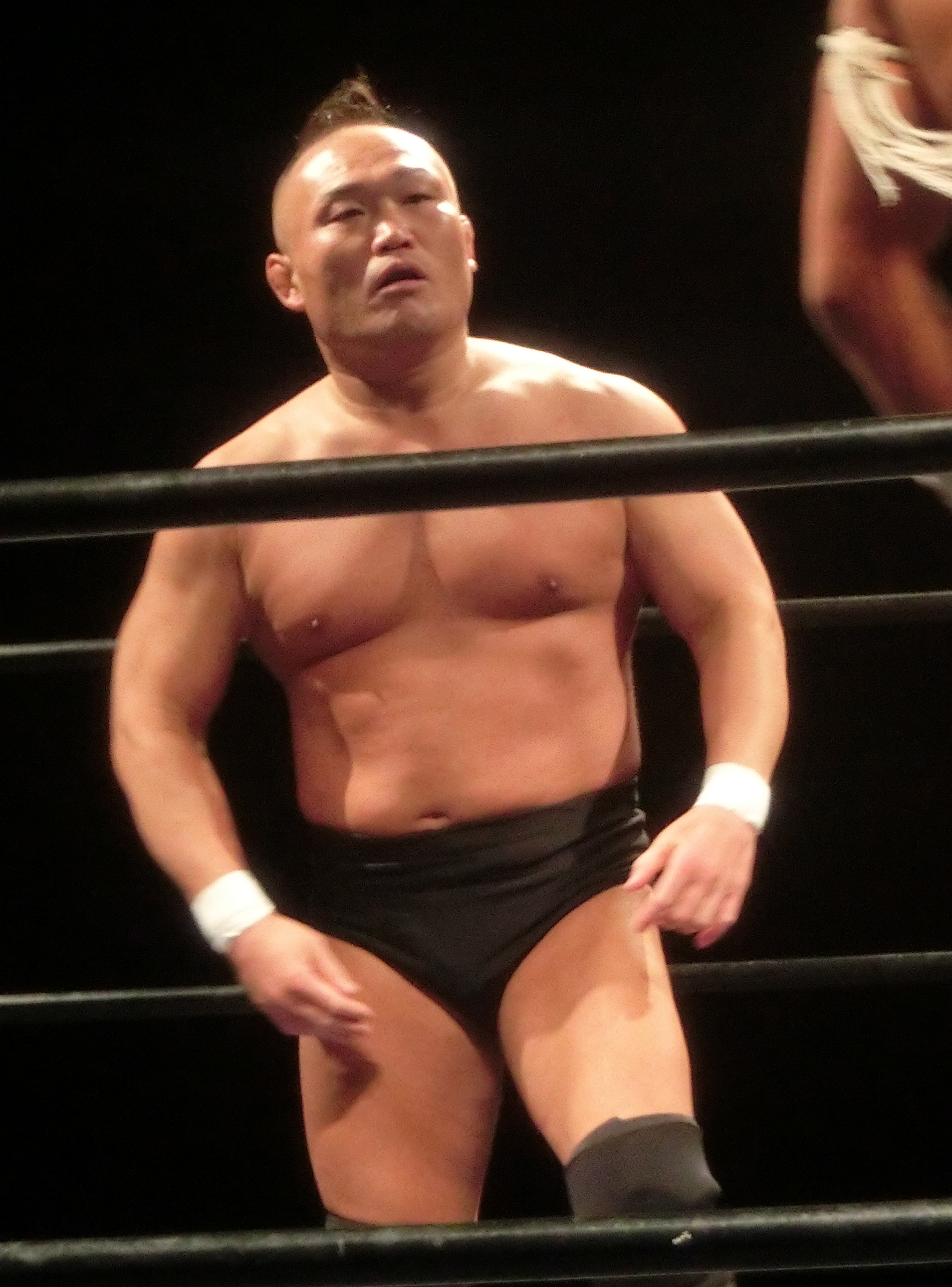
- Born: October 22, 1971 (age 54); Japan
- Nationality: Japanese
- Height: 5 ft 7 in (1.70 m)
- Weight: 192 lb (87 kg; 13.7 st)
- Division: Heavyweight; Light Heavyweight; Middleweight; Welterweight
- Style: Wrestling, Kickboxing, Judo, Sumo, Karate
- Years active: 1997–2010

Mixed martial arts record
- Total: 15
- Wins: 1
- By submission: 1
- Losses: 14
- By knockout: 8
- By submission: 2
- By decision: 4

Other information
- Mixed martial arts record from Sherdog

Nobuhiro Tsurumaki (鶴巻 伸洋, Tsurumaki Nobuhiro; born October 22, 1971) is a Japanese professional wrestler and mixed martial artist. He competed in the Light Heavyweight division.

== Mixed martial arts record ==
Professional record breakdown
15 matches	1 win	14 losses
By knockout	0	8
By submission	1	2
By decision	0	4

Res.	Record	Opponent	Method	Event	Date	Round	Time	Location	Notes
Loss	1-14	Yusaku Inoue	TKO (punches)	GCM: Cage Force 16	April 11, 2010	1	2:48	Tokyo, Japan	Welterweight debut.
Loss	1-13	Ikkei Nagamura	TKO (punches)	GCM: Cage Force & Valkyrie	July 12, 2009	1	0:37	Tokyo, Japan	
Loss	1-12	Shuji Morikawa	TKO (punches)	GCM: Cage Force 9	December 6, 2008	2	0:37	Tokyo, Japan	
Loss	1-11	Keitaro Maeda	Decision (unanimous)	GCM: Cage Force 6	April 5, 2008	3	3:00	Tokyo, Japan	
Win	1-10	Yuta Nakamura	Submission (achilles lock)	GCM: Demolition West in Yamaguchi	November 25, 2007	1	1:56	Hikari, Yamaguchi, Japan	
Loss	0-10	Ryan Bigler	Submission (rear-naked choke)	Geran Haga: Blood Wars 2	May 28, 2007	1	0:00	Hagåtña, Guam	
Loss	0-9	Masahiro Toryu	KO (punch)	Pancrase: Blow 11	December 10, 2006	1	1:16	Tokyo, Japan	Return to Middleweight.
Loss	0-8	Kazuhiro Hanada	TKO (cut)	GCM: Demolition 030629	June 29, 2003	1	2:53	Tokyo, Japan	
Loss	0-7	Daisuke Nakamura	Submission (armbar)	GCM: Demolition 030126	January 26, 2003	1	2:06	Tokyo, Japan	
Loss	0-6	Yuji Hisamatsu	Decision (40-35)	GCM: ORG 2nd	May 12, 2002	2	5:00	Tokyo, Japan	
Loss	0-5	Daisuke Watanabe	TKO (punches)	Pancrase: Proof 5	August 25, 2001	2	0:17	Tokyo, Japan	Light Heavyweight debut.
Loss	0-4	Izuru Takeuchi	Decision (unanimous)	Shooto: Gig '99	April 9, 1999	2	5:00	Tokyo, Japan	
Loss	0-3	Ryuta Sakurai	TKO (cut)	Shooto: Shooter's Soul	January 27, 1999	1	0:54	Setagaya, Tokyo, Japan	
Loss	0-2	Yuki Sasaki	Decision (unanimous)	Shooto: Shooter's Dream	September 18, 1998	2	5:00	Setagaya, Tokyo, Japan	Middleweight debut.
Loss	0-1	Michael Pacholik	TKO (submission to punches)	WVC 3: World Vale Tudo Championship 3	January 19, 1997	1	1:25	São Paulo, Brazil	

== See also ==
- List of male mixed martial artists
