= Masakazu Kuramochi =

Japanese mixed martial artist

Masakazu Kuramochi 倉持正和
- Born: February 7, 1972 (age 54); Bunkyo, Tokyo, Japan
- Nationality: Japanese
- Height: 5 ft 8 in (1.73 m)
- Weight: 154 lb (70 kg; 11.0 st)
- Division: Welterweight; Lightweight; Featherweight
- Reach: 69 in (175 cm)
- Stance: Orthodox
- Fighting out of: Tokyo, Japan
- Team: R-Blood
- Years active: 1993-2008

Mixed martial arts record
- Total: 18
- Wins: 4
- By decision: 4
- Losses: 12
- By knockout: 5
- By submission: 3
- By decision: 4
- Draws: 2

Other information
- Mixed martial arts record from Sherdog

Masakazu Kuramochi Japanese: 倉持正和 (born February 7, 1972) is a Japanese retired mixed martial artist. He competed in the Lightweight division. Kurmochi was a veteran of every major Japanese mixed martial arts promotion with the exception of PRIDE.

== Mixed martial arts record ==
Professional record breakdown
18 matches	4 wins	12 losses
By knockout	0	5
By submission	0	3
By decision	4	4
Draws	2	

Res.	Record	Opponent	Method	Event	Date	Round	Time	Location	Notes
Loss	4-12-2	Yukio Sakaguchi	KO (soccer kick)	Pancrase: Shining 5	June 1, 2008	1	2:01	Tokyo, Japan	Lightweight bout.
Loss	4-11-2	Yuki Ito	TKO (punches)	Deep: Oyaji Deep	June 16, 2007	1	4:58	Tokyo, Japan	
Loss	4-10-2	Takuya Wada	Decision (unanimous)	Pancrase: 2005 Neo-Blood Tournament Finals	August 27, 2005	2	5:00	Tokyo, Japan	
Loss	4-9-2	Takafumi Ito	KO (punch)	Pancrase: Spiral 1	February 4, 2005	1	3:30	Tokyo, Japan	
Loss	4-8-2	Koji Oishi	TKO (punches)	Pancrase: Brave 6	June 22, 2004	2	4:13	Tokyo, Japan	Welterweight debut.
Win	4-7-2	Hideo Ota	Decision (unanimous)	GCM: Demolition Atom 6	March 14, 2004	2	5:00	Tokyo, Japan	
Draw	3-7-2	Takaichi Hirayama	Draw	GCM: Demolition 030923	September 23, 2003	2	5:00	Japan	
Loss	3-7-1	Kenichiro Togashi	Submission (armbar)	Shooto: Treasure Hunt 6	May 5, 2002	1	4:31	Tokyo, Japan	Return to Lightweight.
Loss	3-6-1	Mitsuhiro Ishida	Decision (unanimous)	Shooto: Treasure Hunt 1	January 12, 2002	2	5:00	Tokyo, Japan	Featherweight debut.
Win	3-5-1	Takuhito Hida	Decision (majority)	Shooto: To The Top 10	November 25, 2001	2	5:00	Tokyo, Japan	
Loss	2-5-1	Yohei Suzuki	Decision (unanimous)	Shooto: Gig East 5	August 15, 2001	2	5:00	Tokyo, Japan	
Loss	2-4-1	Masato Fujiwara	TKO (cut)	Shooto: Gig East 1	April 28, 2001	1	1:01	Tokyo, Japan	
Loss	2-3-1	Hiroshi Tsuruya	Submission (armbar)	Shooto: R.E.A.D. 1	January 14, 2000	1	1:51	Tokyo, Japan	
Draw	2-2-1	Kohei Yasumi	Draw	Shooto: Renaxis 4	September 5, 1999	2	5:00	Tokyo, Japan	
Win	2-2	Takaharu Murahama	Decision (majority)	Shooto: Las Grandes Viajes 3	May 13, 1998	2	5:00	Tokyo, Japan	
Win	1-2	Mitsuo Matsumoto	Decision (unanimous)	Shooto: Gig '98 1st	April 10, 1998	2	5:00	Tokyo, Japan	
Loss	0-2	Takuya Kuwabara	Decision (split)	Shooto: Vale Tudo Junction 3	May 7, 1996	3	3:00	Tokyo, Japan	
Loss	0-1	Yuki Nakai	Submission (heel hook)	Shooto: Shooto	June 24, 1993	2	1:36	Tokyo, Japan	

== See also ==
- List of male mixed martial artists
