= Yohei Nanbu =

Japanese mixed martial artist

Yohei Nanbu 南部洋平
- Born: December 22, 1976 (age 49); Japan
- Nationality: Japanese
- Height: 5 ft 9 in (1.75 m)
- Weight: 143 lb (65 kg; 10.2 st)
- Division: Featherweight
- Team: Shooting Gym Yokohama
- Years active: 1999 - 2004

Mixed martial arts record
- Total: 11
- Wins: 2
- By decision: 2
- Losses: 7
- By knockout: 1
- By decision: 6
- Draws: 2

Other information
- Mixed martial arts record from Sherdog

Yohei Nanbu Japanese: 南部洋平 (born December 22, 1976) is a Japanese mixed martial artist. He competed in the Featherweight division.

== Mixed martial arts record ==
Professional record breakdown
11 matches	2 wins	7 losses
By knockout	2	1
By decision	0	6
Draws	2	

Res.	Record	Opponent	Method	Event	Date	Round	Time	Location	Notes
Loss	2–7–2	Hatsu Hioki	Decision (unanimous)	Shooto: Gig Central 5	March 28, 2004	2	5:00	Nagoya, Aichi, Japan	
Loss	2–6–2	Akitoshi Tamura	Decision (unanimous)	Shooto: Wanna Shooto 2003	November 3, 2003	2	5:00	Tokyo, Japan	
Loss	2–5–2	Jin Kazeta	TKO (knee and punches)	Shooto: 2/6 in Kitazawa Town Hall	February 6, 2003	1	3:30	Setagaya, Tokyo, Japan	
Loss	2–4–2	Makoto Ishikawa	Decision (majority)	Shooto: Treasure Hunt 5	March 15, 2002	2	5:00	Tokyo, Japan	
Loss	2–3–2	Takaharu Murahama	Decision (unanimous)	Shooto: To The Top 1	January 19, 2001	2	5:00	Tokyo, Japan	
Draw	2–2–2	Takumi Nakayama	Draw	Shooto: R.E.A.D. 12	November 12, 2000	2	5:00	Tokyo, Japan	
Loss	2–2–1	Kohei Yasumi	Decision (majority)	Shooto: R.E.A.D. 1	January 14, 2000	2	5:00	Tokyo, Japan	
Win	2–1–1	Yohei Suzuki	Decision (unanimous)	Shooto: Shooter's Ambition	October 6, 1999	2	5:00	Setagaya, Tokyo, Japan	
Win	1–1–1	Koichi Tanaka	Decision (majority)	Shooto: Renaxis 3	August 4, 1999	2	5:00	Setagaya, Tokyo, Japan	
Draw	0–1–1	Hiromichi Maruyama	Draw	Shooto: Shooter's Passion	May 27, 1999	2	5:00	Setagaya, Tokyo, Japan	
Loss	0–1	Kazuya Abe	Decision (unanimous)	Shooto: Shooter's Soul	January 27, 1999	2	5:00	Setagaya, Tokyo, Japan	

== See also ==
- List of male mixed martial artists
