= Fumio Usami =

Japanese mixed martial artist

- Born: July 6, 1968 (age 58); Japan
- Other names: Wild
- Nationality: Japanese
- Height: 5 ft 6 in (1.68 m)
- Weight: 143 lb (65 kg; 10.2 st)
- Division: Flyweight
- Team: Freelance
- Years active: 1999 - 2003

Mixed martial arts record
- Total: 5
- Wins: 3
- By knockout: 2
- By decision: 1
- Losses: 1
- By knockout: 1
- Draws: 1

Other information
- Mixed martial arts record from Sherdog

Fumio Usami (born July 7, 1968) is a Japanese mixed martial artist. He competed in the Flyweight division.

== Mixed martial arts record ==
Professional record breakdown
5 matches	3 wins	1 loss
By knockout	2	1
By decision	1	0
Draws	1	

Res.	Record	Opponent	Method	Event	Date	Round	Time	Location	Notes
Win	3–1–1	Naosuke Mizoguchi	TKO (punches)	Shooto 2003: 6/27 in Hiroshima Sun Plaza	June 27, 2003	1	4:05	Hiroshima, Japan	
Draw	2–1–1	Naoto Kojima	Draw	Shooto: Gig East 11	September 25, 2002	2	5:00	Tokyo, Japan	
Loss	2–1	Hiroshi Umemura	TKO (punches)	Shooto: R.E.A.D. 3	April 2, 2000	1	2:03	Kadoma, Osaka, Japan	
Win	2–0	Masashi Kameda	Decision (unanimous)	Shooto: Shooter's Ambition	October 6, 1999	2	5:00	Setagaya, Tokyo, Japan	
Win	1–0	Teruyuki Hashimoto	TKO (punches)	Shooto: Shooter's Soul	January 27, 1999	2	0:46	Setagaya, Tokyo, Japan	

== See also ==
- List of male mixed martial artists
