= Kazuya Abe =

Japanese mixed martial artist

- Born: Japan
- Native name: 阿部和也
- Other names: Abkz
- Nationality: Japanese
- Height: 5 ft 6 in (1.68 m)
- Weight: 132 lb (60 kg; 9.4 st)
- Division: Bantamweight (1999, 2000-2002); Featherweight (1999-2001, 2002)
- Team: Paraestra Tokyo
- Years active: 1999 - 2002

Mixed martial arts record
- Total: 8
- Wins: 4
- By knockout: 1
- By submission: 1
- By decision: 2
- Losses: 3
- By knockout: 1
- By decision: 2
- Draws: 1

Other information
- Mixed martial arts record from Sherdog

Kazuya Abe (Japanese: 阿部和也) is a Japanese retired mixed martial artist. He competed in the Bantamweight and Featherweight divisions.

== Martial arts career ==
Kazuya Abe made his mixed martial arts debut in 1999, at Shooto: Shooter's Soul. He faced Yohei Nanbu. Abe would come out victorious, winning a unanimous decision.

He won another unanimous decision, when he faced the 0-1 Koji Takeuchi during Shooto: Renaxis 1.

He would suffer his first professional loss during Shooto: Renaxis 3, losing by a majority decision against Takenori Ito.

Looking to bounce back during Shooto: Renaxis 5, he fought the future DEEP featherweight and lightweight champion Dokonjonosuke Mishima, and lost a unanimous decision.

His decision streak would continue when he faced Kazuhiro Inoue. The bout ended in a draw.

He would then earn two stoppage wins, knocking Makoto Ishikawa out in the first round, and securing a first round armbar against Matt Hamilton.

His last fight came against Kentaro Imaizumi during Shooto: Treasure Hunt 10. Abe lost, after his corner threw in the towel during the third minute of the first round. This would be the last time Kazuya Abe has fought.

== Mixed martial arts record ==
Professional record breakdown
8 matches	4 wins	3 losses
By knockout	1	1
By submission	1	0
By decision	2	2
Draws	1	

Res.	Record	Opponent	Method	Event	Date	Round	Time	Location	Notes
Loss	4–3–1	Kentaro Imaizumi	TKO (corner stoppage)	Shooto: Treasure Hunt 10	September 16, 2002	1	2:06	Yokohama, Kanagawa, Japan	Return to featherweight
Win	4–2–1	Matt Hamilton	Submission (armbar)	Shooto: Gig East 9	May 28, 2002	1	3:56	Tokyo, Japan	
Win	3–2–1	Makoto Ishikawa	KO (punch)	Shooto: To The Top 8	September 2, 2001	1	0:29	Tokyo, Japan	Return to bantamweight
Draw	2–2–1	Kazuhiro Inoue	Draw	Shooto: Gig East 1	April 28, 2001	2	5:00	Tokyo, Japan	
Loss	2–2	Dokonjonosuke Mishima	Decision (unanimous)	Shooto: Renaxis 5	October 29, 1999	2	5:00	Kadoma, Osaka, Japan	Featherweight debut
Loss	2–1	Takenori Ito	Decision (majority)	Shooto: Renaxis 3	August 4, 1999	2	5:00	Setagaya, Tokyo, Japan	
Win	2–0	Koji Takeuchi	Decision (unanimous)	Shooto: Renaxis 1	March 28, 1999	2	5:00	Tokyo, Japan	
Win	1–0	Yohei Nanbu	Decision (unanimous)	Shooto: Shooter's Soul	January 27, 1999	2	5:00	Setagaya, Tokyo, Japan	Bantamweight debut

== See also ==
- List of male mixed martial artists
