= Masashi Kameda =

Japanese mixed martial arts fighter

Masashi Kameda 亀田正志
- Born: July 13, 1975 (age 51); Japan
- Nationality: Japanese
- Height: 5 ft 7 in (1.70 m)
- Weight: 143 lb (65 kg; 10.2 st)
- Division: Featherweight
- Team: Cobra Kai Mma Dojo
- Years active: 1999 - 2004

Mixed martial arts record
- Total: 11
- Wins: 2
- By submission: 1
- Unknown: 1
- Losses: 6
- By knockout: 2
- By submission: 2
- By decision: 2
- Draws: 3

Other information
- Mixed martial arts record from Sherdog

Masashi Kameda Japanese: 亀田正志 (born July 13, 1975) is a Japanese mixed martial artist. He competed in the Featherweight division.

== Mixed martial arts record ==
Professional record breakdown
11 matches	2 wins	6 losses
By knockout	0	2
By submission	1	2
By decision	0	2
Unknown	1	0
Draws	3	

Res.	Record	Opponent	Method	Event	Date	Round	Time	Location	Notes
Loss	2–6–3	Motoyuki Takinishi	Submission (kimura)	Deep: clubDeep Osaka	November 28, 2004	1	4:58	Osaka, Japan	
Draw	2–5–3	Mitsuhisa Sunabe	Draw	Pancrase: Brave 7	August 22, 2004	2	5:00	Osaka, Japan	
Win	2–5–2	Mitsuhisa Sunabe	DQ (head-butt)	Pancrase: Brave 6	June 22, 2004	1	3:52	Tokyo, Japan	
Loss	1–5–2	Tomoyuki Fukami	KO (punch)	Deep: 11th Impact	July 13, 2003	2	3:46	Osaka, Japan	
Loss	1–4–2	Tomomi Iwama	Decision (unanimous)	Deep: 8th Impact	March 4, 2003	3	5:00	Tokyo, Japan	
Loss	1–3–2	Hideki Kadowaki	Submission (rear-naked choke)	Shooto: Treasure Hunt 9	July 27, 2002	1	2:23	Setagaya, Tokyo, Japan	
Win	1–2–2	Masanori Sugatani	Submission (armbar)	Shooto: Treasure Hunt 3	February 11, 2002	1	4:34	Kobe, Hyogo, Japan	
Loss	0–2–2	Norifumi Yamamoto	KO (punch)	Shooto: To The Top 6	July 6, 2001	1	4:17	Tokyo, Japan	
Draw	0–1–2	Hiroshi Umemura	Draw	Shooto: Gig West 1	February 18, 2001	2	5:00	Osaka, Japan	
Draw	0–1–1	Yoshihiro Fujita	Draw	Shooto: R.E.A.D. 8	August 4, 2000	2	5:00	Osaka, Japan	
Loss	0–1	Fumio Usami	Decision (unanimous)	Shooto: Shooter's Ambition	October 6, 1999	2	5:00	Setagaya, Tokyo, Japan	

== See also ==
- List of male mixed martial artists
