= Yohei Suzuki =

Japanese mixed martial artist

- Born: April 6, 1973 (age 53); Japan
- Nationality: Japanese
- Height: 5 ft 7 in (1.70 m)
- Weight: 154 lb (70 kg; 11.0 st)
- Division: Lightweight
- Team: Paraestra Tokyo
- Years active: 1997 - 2010

Mixed martial arts record
- Total: 17
- Wins: 8
- By knockout: 3
- By decision: 5
- Losses: 8
- By knockout: 2
- By submission: 2
- By decision: 4
- Draws: 1

Other information
- Mixed martial arts record from Sherdog

Yohei Suzuki (born April 6, 1973) is a Japanese mixed martial artist. He competed in the lightweight division.

== Mixed martial arts record ==
Professional record breakdown
17 matches	8 wins	8 losses
By knockout	3	2
By submission	0	2
By decision	5	4
Draws	1	

Res.	Record	Opponent	Method	Event	Date	Round	Time	Location	Notes
Win	8-8-1	Yuji Inoue	TKO (Punches)	Shooto: Shooting Disco 11: Tora Tora Tora!	February 27, 2010	1	1:13	Tokyo, Japan	
Loss	7-8-1	Tomonori Taniguchi	KO (Punches)	Shooto: Battle Mix Tokyo 3	May 26, 2007	2	2:41	Tokyo, Japan	
Loss	7-7-1	Takeshi Inoue	TKO (Punches)	Shooto: 3/22 in Korakuen Hall	March 22, 2004	1	2:40	Tokyo, Japan	
Loss	7-6-1	Naoki Matsushita	Decision (Unanimous)	Shooto: Gig Central 2	October 6, 2002	2	5:00	Nagoya, Aichi, Japan	
Win	7-5-1	Ken Omatsu	Decision (Unanimous)	Shooto: Treasure Hunt 9	July 27, 2002	2	5:00	Setagaya, Tokyo, Japan	
Loss	6-5-1	Hermes Franca	Submission (Guillotine Choke)	HOOKnSHOOT: Relentless	May 25, 2002	1	1:04	Evansville, Indiana, United States	
Win	6-4-1	Patrick Rahael	TKO (Punches)	Shooto: Wanna Shooto 2002	April 14, 2002	1	3:20	Setagaya, Tokyo, Japan	
Loss	5-4-1	Takaharu Murahama	Decision (Unanimous)	Shooto: Gig East 8	February 28, 2002	2	5:00	Tokyo, Japan	
Win	5-3-1	Victor Estrada	TKO (Strikes)	HOOKnSHOOT: Kings 2	November 18, 2001	2	0:00	Evansville, Indiana, United States	
Win	4-3-1	Masakazu Kuramochi	Decision (Unanimous)	Shooto: Gig East 5	August 15, 2001	2	5:00	Tokyo, Japan	
Loss	3-3-1	Tatsuya Kawajiri	Submission (Rear-Naked Choke)	Shooto: Gig East 2	May 22, 2001	1	2:42	Tokyo, Japan	
Draw	3-2-1	Tatsuya Kawajiri	Draw	Shooto: Wanna Shooto 2001	April 8, 2001	2	5:00	Setagaya, Tokyo, Japan	
Win	3-2	Kazumichi Takada	Decision (Unanimous)	Shooto: R.E.A.D. 6	July 16, 2000	2	5:00	Tokyo, Japan	
Win	2-2	Mitsuo Matsumoto	Decision (Unanimous)	Shooto: R.E.A.D. 1	January 14, 2000	2	5:00	Tokyo, Japan	
Loss	1-2	Yohei Nanbu	Decision (Unanimous)	Shooto: Shooter's Ambition	October 6, 1999	2	5:00	Setagaya, Tokyo, Japan	
Loss	1-1	Takaharu Murahama	Decision (Unanimous)	Shooto: Renaxis 3	August 4, 1999	2	5:00	Setagaya, Tokyo, Japan	
Win	1-0	Zack Potter	Decision	UFCF: Road to the Championships 1	July 7, 1997	1	10:00	Washington, United States	

== See also ==
- List of male mixed martial artists
