= Hiroki Kotani =

Japanese mixed martial artist

Hiroki Kotani 小谷光毅
- Born: July 11, 1971 (age 55); Japan
- Nationality: Japanese
- Height: 5 ft 7 in (1.70 m)
- Weight: 154 lb (70 kg; 11.0 st)
- Division: Lightweight
- Team: K'z Factory
- Years active: 1997 - 2007

Mixed martial arts record
- Total: 19
- Wins: 3
- By submission: 2
- By decision: 1
- Losses: 12
- By knockout: 4
- By submission: 2
- By decision: 6
- Draws: 4

Other information
- Mixed martial arts record from Sherdog

Hiroki Kotani Japanese: 小谷光毅 (born July 11, 1971) is a Japanese mixed martial artist. He competed in the Lightweight division.

== Mixed martial arts record ==
Professional record breakdown
19 matches	3 wins	12 losses
By knockout	0	4
By submission	2	2
By decision	1	6
Draws	4	

Res.	Record	Opponent	Method	Event	Date	Round	Time	Location	Notes
Loss	3–12–4	Masashi Takeda	KO (punch)	Zst: Zst 12	February 12, 2007	1	1:28	Tokyo, Japan	
Win	3–11–4	Anton Kuivanen	Submission (heel hook)	Zst: Prestige	September 23, 2006	1	1:17	Turku, Finland	
Loss	2–11–4	Jon Friedland	KO (punch)	XFO: Xtreme Fighting Organization 8	December 10, 2005	1	2:33	Lakemoor, Illinois, United States	
Loss	2–10–4	Alex Gasson	Decision (unanimous)	XFO 4: International	December 3, 2004	3	5:00	Lakemoor, Illinois, United States	
Loss	2–9–4	Edson Diniz	Submission (armbar)	AFC 7: Absolute Fighting Championships 7	February 27, 2004	1	3:01	Fort Lauderdale, Florida, United States	
Draw	2–8–4	Rich Clementi	Draw	Zst: The Battlefield 4	September 7, 2003	3	5:00	Tokyo, Japan	
Loss	2–8–3	Mitsuo Matsumoto	Decision (majority)	Shooto: 2/6 in Kitazawa Town Hall	February 6, 2003	2	5:00	Setagaya, Tokyo, Japan	
Loss	2–7–3	Takayuki Okochi	KO (knee)	Shooto: Treasure Hunt 9	July 27, 2002	1	2:06	Setagaya, Tokyo, Japan	
Draw	2–6–3	Seiki Uchimura	Draw	Shooto: Gig East 8	February 28, 2002	2	5:00	Tokyo, Japan	
Loss	2–6–2	Mitsuhiro Ishida	Decision (unanimous)	Shooto: To The Top 9	September 27, 2001	2	5:00	Tokyo, Japan	
Win	2–5–2	Takashi Ochi	Decision (unanimous)	Shooto: To The Top 5	June 30, 2001	2	5:00	Setagaya, Tokyo, Japan	
Draw	1–5–2	Takeshi Yamazaki	Draw	Shooto: Wanna Shooto 2001	April 8, 2001	2	5:00	Setagaya, Tokyo, Japan	
Draw	1–5–1	Mitsuo Matsumoto	Draw	Shooto: R.E.A.D. 7	July 22, 2000	2	5:00	Setagaya, Tokyo, Japan	
Loss	1–5	Tetsuharu Ikei	KO (punch)	Shooto: Renaxis 3	August 4, 1999	1	0:35	Setagaya, Tokyo, Japan	
Loss	1–4	Dokonjonosuke Mishima	Submission (rear-naked choke)	Shooto: Shooter's Passion	May 27, 1999	1	4:00	Setagaya, Tokyo, Japan	
Loss	1–3	Kazumichi Takada	Decision (majority)	Shooto: Las Grandes Viajes 3	May 13, 1998	2	5:00	Tokyo, Japan	
Loss	1–2	Takenori Ito	Decision (unanimous)	Shooto: Las Grandes Viajes 2	March 1, 1998	2	5:00	Tokyo, Japan	
Loss	1–1	Caol Uno	Decision (unanimous)	Lumax Cup: Tournament of J '97 Lightweight Tournament	December 20, 1997	2	3:00	Japan	
Win	1–0	Naoto Kojima	Submission (heel hook)	Lumax Cup: Tournament of J '97 Lightweight Tournament	December 20, 1997	1	1:10	Japan	

== See also ==
- List of male mixed martial artists
