= Kenji Osawa =

Japanese martial artist

Kenji Osawa 大沢ケンジ
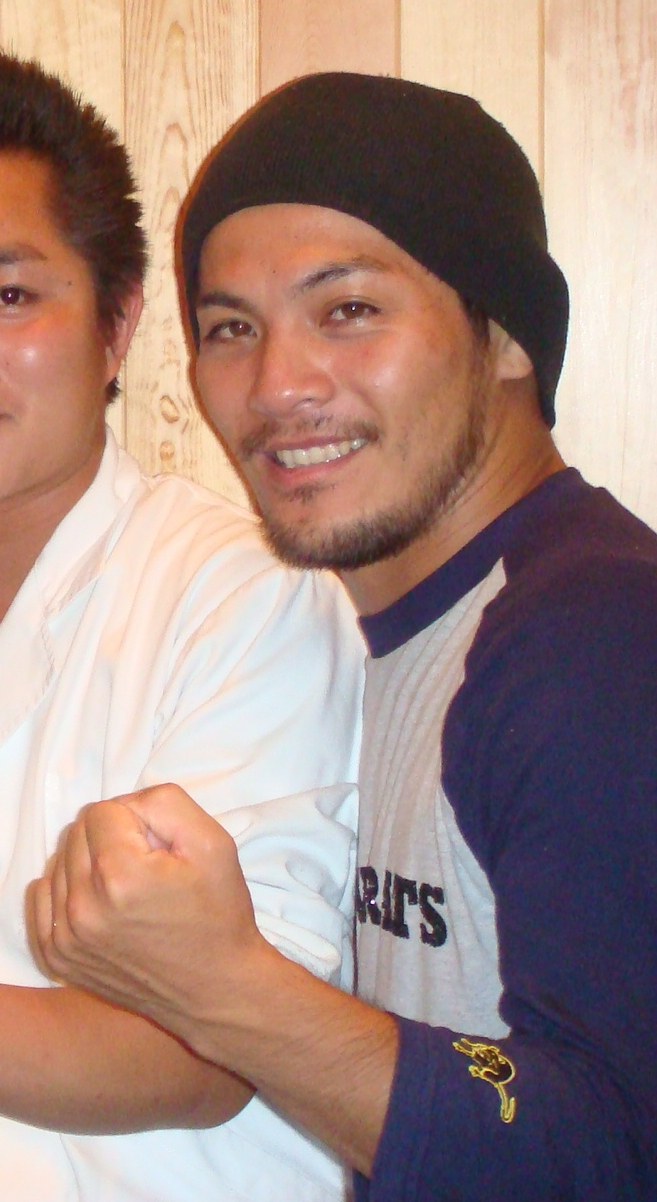
- Born: November 4, 1976 (age 49); Musashimurayama, Tokyo, Japan
- Nationality: Japanese
- Height: 5 ft 7 in (1.70 m)
- Weight: 140 lb (64 kg; 10 st)
- Division: Bantamweight
- Style: Boxing, BJJ
- Fighting out of: Japan
- Team: Wajitsu Keishukai Hearts
- Rank: Brown belt in Brazilian jiu-jitsu
- Years active: 2003-2014

Mixed martial arts record
- Total: 33
- Wins: 20
- By knockout: 4
- By submission: 2
- By decision: 14
- Losses: 11
- By knockout: 1
- By submission: 2
- By decision: 8
- Draws: 2

Other information
- Mixed martial arts record from Sherdog

Kenji Osawa Japanese: 大沢ケンジ (born November 4, 1976) is a retired Japanese mixed martial artist from Tokyo. He debuted in MMA over a decade ago, and trains and fights out of Wajitsu Keishukai, where he teaches once a week.

== MMA career ==
Osawa's fight record is 21-11-2 and has competed in many of the top organisations such as Shooto, WEC, DREAM and DEEP.

He was scheduled to fight Brazilian jiu-jitsu ace Rani Yahya on August 9, 2009, at WEC 42, but due to a foot injury, he was replaced by John Hosman.

Osawa lost via unanimous decision to Antonio Banuelos on November 18, 2009, at WEC 44 and was subsequently released from the promotion.

Osawa made his DREAM debut against Yoshiro Maeda at DREAM.14 on May 29, 2010, winning a close split decision.

On April 29, 2014, Osawa retired after losing a rematch to Takafumi Otsuka, a fighter Osawa had previously beaten in 2011.

== Career titles ==
- Amateur Shooto '02 East Japan Title
- Amateur Shooto '02 All Japan Title

== Mixed martial arts record ==
Professional record breakdown
| 33 matches | 20 wins | 11 losses |
| By knockout | 4 | 1 |
| By submission | 2 | 2 |
| By decision | 14 | 8 |
| Draws | 2 | |

| Res. | Record | Opponent | Method | Event | Date | Round | Time | Location | Notes |
|---|---|---|---|---|---|---|---|---|---|
| Loss | 20–11–2 | Takafumi Otsuka | Decision (unanimous) | Deep: 66 Impact | April 29, 2014 | 3 | 5:00 | Tokyo, Japan | |
| Win | 20–10–2 | Seiji Akao | Decision (split) | Deep: Tribe Tokyo Fight | October 20, 2013 | 3 | 5:00 | Tokyo, Japan | |
| Win | 19–10–2 | Takeshi Inoue | Decision (unanimous) | Vale Tudo Japan: VTJ 1st | December 24, 2012 | 3 | 5:00 | Tokyo, Japan | |
| Win | 18–10–2 | Keisuke Fujiwara | Decision (unanimous) | Dream: Japan GP Final | July 16, 2011 | 2 | 5:00 | Tokyo, Japan | DREAM Bantamweight Grand Prix Third Place bout |
| Loss | 17–10–2 | Masakazu Imanari | Submission (achilles lock) | Dream: Fight for Japan! | May 29, 2011 | 2 | 0:58 | Saitama, Saitama, Japan | DREAM Bantamweight Grand Prix Semifinal |
| Win | 17–9–2 | Takafumi Otsuka | Decision (split) | Dream: Fight for Japan! | May 29, 2011 | 2 | 5:00 | Saitama, Saitama, Japan | DREAM Bantamweight Grand Prix Quarterfinal |
| Win | 16–9–2 | Yoshiro Maeda | Decision (split) | Dream 14 | May 29, 2010 | 3 | 5:00 | Saitama, Saitama, Japan | |
| Loss | 15–9–2 | Antonio Banuelos | Decision (unanimous) | WEC 44 | November 18, 2009 | 3 | 5:00 | Las Vegas, Nevada, United States | |
| Win | 15–8–2 | Rafael Rebello | Decision (split) | WEC 39 | March 1, 2009 | 3 | 5:00 | Corpus Christi, Texas, United States | |
| Win | 14–8–2 | Tomoya Miyashita | Decision (unanimous) | GCM: Cage Force EX Eastern Bound | November 8, 2008 | 3 | 5:00 | Tokyo, Japan | |
| Loss | 13–8–2 | Scott Jorgensen | Decision (unanimous) | WEC 35: Condit vs. Miura | August 3, 2008 | 3 | 5:00 | Las Vegas, Nevada, United States | |
| Draw | 13–7–2 | Chris Manuel | Draw | WEC 33: Marshall vs. Stann | March 26, 2008 | 3 | 5:00 | Las Vegas, Nevada, United States | |
| Win | 13–7–1 | Nobuhiro Yamauchi | Decision (unanimous) | Cage Force 5 | December 1, 2007 | 2 | 5:00 | Tokyo, Japan | |
| Loss | 12–7–1 | Daniel Lima | Decision (split) | Shooto: Back To Our Roots 5 | September 22, 2007 | 3 | 5:00 | Tokyo, Japan | |
| Loss | 12–6–1 | Marcos Galvão | Decision (majority) | Shooto: Back To Our Roots 3 | May 18, 2007 | 3 | 5:00 | Tokyo, Japan | |
| Win | 12–5–1 | Takeya Mizugaki | TKO (punches and knees) | Shooto: 11/10 in Korakuen Hall | November 10, 2006 | 2 | 0:59 | Tokyo, Japan | |
| Loss | 11–5–1 | Akitoshi Hokazono | Decision (unanimous) | Shooto 2006: 7/21 in Korakuen Hall | July 21, 2006 | 3 | 5:00 | Tokyo, Japan | |
| Win | 11–4–1 | Naoya Uematsu | Decision (majority) | Shooto: The Victory of the Truth | February 17, 2006 | 3 | 5:00 | Tokyo, Japan | |
| Loss | 10–4–1 | Daiki Hata | Decision (unanimous) | GCM: D.O.G. 4 | December 11, 2005 | 2 | 5:00 | Tokyo, Japan | |
| Draw | 10–3–1 | Daniel Lima | Draw | Shooto 2005: 11/6 in Korakuen Hall | November 6, 2005 | 3 | 5:00 | Tokyo, Japan | |
| Win | 10–3 | Jin Akimoto | Decision (majority) | Shooto: 5/4 in Korakuen Hall | May 4, 2005 | 2 | 5:00 | Tokyo, Japan | |
| Win | 9–3 | Minoru Tsuiki | KO (knees) | GCM: D.O.G. 1 | March 12, 2005 | 3 | 0:22 | Tokyo, Japan | |
| Win | 8–3 | Seiji Otsuka | Decision (unanimous) | Shooto: Wanna Shooto 2004 | November 12, 2004 | 2 | 5:00 | Tokyo, Japan | |
| Win | 7–3 | Hiroshi Umemura | Decision (unanimous) | Shooto: Gig Central 6 | September 12, 2004 | 3 | 5:00 | Nagoya, Japan | |
| Loss | 6–3 | So Tazawa | TKO (cut) | Shooto 2004: 7/4 in Kitazawa Town Hall | July 4, 2004 | 1 | 2:33 | Tokyo, Japan | |
| Loss | 6–2 | Akitoshi Hokazono | Submission (rear-naked choke) | Shooto 2004: 4/16 in Kitazawa Town Hall | April 16, 2004 | 1 | 1:50 | Tokyo, Japan | |
| Win | 6–1 | Tetsuya Nishi | TKO (punches) | GCM: Demolition Atom 6 | March 14, 2004 | 1 | 4:45 | Tokyo, Japan | |
| Win | 5–1 | Hiroyuki Tanaka | Decision (unanimous) | Shooto 2004: 1/24 in Korakuen Hall | January 24, 2004 | 2 | 5:00 | Tokyo, Japan | |
| Win | 4–1 | Augusto Frota | Submission (arm-triangle choke) | Shooto: Wanna Shooto 2003 | November 3, 2003 | 2 | 4:24 | Tokyo, Japan | |
| Loss | 3–1 | Yohei Mikami | Decision (unanimous) | Shooto: 9/5 in Korakuen Hall | September 5, 2003 | 2 | 5:00 | Tokyo, Japan | |
| Win | 3–0 | Atsunori Hiruma | Decision (unanimous) | GCM: Demolition 8 | June 29, 2003 | 2 | 5:00 | Tokyo, Japan | |
| Win | 2–0 | Manabu Kano | Submission (rear-naked choke) | Shooto: 3/18 in Korakuen Hall | March 18, 2003 | 2 | 3:21 | Yokohama, Japan | |
| Win | 1–0 | Koki Sato | TKO (knees) | GCM: Demolition 030209 | February 9, 2003 | 2 | 1:46 | Yokohama, Japan | |
