= Teruyuki Hashimoto =

Japanese mixed martial arts fighter

Teruyuki Hashimoto 橋本輝之
- Born: Japan
- Nationality: Japanese
- Weight: 143 lb (65 kg; 10.2 st)
- Division: Featherweight
- Team: Shooting Gym Kita-Kanto
- Years active: 1999 - 2000

Mixed martial arts record
- Total: 3
- Wins: 0
- Losses: 3
- By knockout: 1
- By submission: 1
- By decision: 1

Other information
- Mixed martial arts record from Sherdog

Teruyuki Hashimoto (Japanese: 橋本輝之) is a Japanese mixed martial artist. He competed in the Featherweight division.

== Mixed martial arts record ==
Professional record breakdown
3 matches	0 wins	3 losses
By knockout	0	1
By submission	0	1
By decision	0	1

Res.	Record	Opponent	Method	Event	Date	Round	Time	Location	Notes
Loss	0–3	Tetsuo Katsuta	Submission (rear-naked choke)	Shooto: R.E.A.D. 4	April 12, 2000	1	4:29	Setagaya, Tokyo, Japan	
Loss	0–2	Kazuhiro Inoue	Decision (unanimous)	Shooto: Gateway to the Extremes	November 4, 1999	2	5:00	Setagaya, Tokyo, Japan	
Loss	0–1	Fumio Usami	TKO (punches)	Shooto: Shooter's Soul	January 27, 1999	2	0:46	Setagaya, Tokyo, Japan	

== See also ==
- List of male mixed martial artists
