= 2001 in Shooto =

Mixed martial arts events

Information
- First date: January 19, 2001
- Last date: December 16, 2001

Events
- Total events: 21

Fights
- Total fights: 137
- Title fights: 5

Chronology
2000 in Shooto	2001 in Shooto	2002 in Shooto

The year 2001 is the 13th year in the history of Shooto, a mixed martial arts promotion based in the Japan. In 2001 Shooto held 21 events beginning with, Shooto: To The Top 1.

== Title fights ==
Title fights in 2001
Weight class				Method	Round	Time	Event	Notes
Middleweight	Anderson Silva	def.	Hayato Sakurai	Decision (Unanimous)	3	5:00	Shooto: To The Top 7	(Note: For The Middleweight Champion.)
Featherweight	Alexandre Franca Nogueira (c)	def.	Tetsuo Katsuta	Submission (Guillotine Choke)	2	2:45	Shooto: To The Top 8	(Note: For The Featherweight Champion.)
Bantamweight	Masahiro Oishi	def.	Mamoru Yamaguchi	Submission (Triangle Armbar)	1	1:44	Shooto: To The Top 10	(Note: For The Bantamweight Champion.)
Lightweight	Takanori Gomi	def.	Rumina Sato	Decision (Unanimous)	3	5:00	Shooto: To The Top Final Act	(Note: For The Lightweight Champion.)
Featherweight	Alexandre Franca Nogueira (c)	def.	Katsuya Toida	Decision (Unanimous)	3	5:00	Shooto: To The Top Final Act	(Note: For The Featherweight Champion.)

== Events list ==
#	Event title	Date	Arena	Location
103	Shooto: To The Top Final Act	December 16, 2001	Tokyo Bay NK Hall	Urayasu, Chiba, Japan
102	Shooto: Gig East 7	November 26, 2001	Kitazawa Town Hall	Tokyo, Japan
101	Shooto: To The Top 10	November 25, 2001	Differ Ariake Arena	Tokyo, Japan
100	Shooto: Gig East 6	October 23, 2001	Kitazawa Town Hall	Tokyo, Japan
99	Shooto: To The Top 9	September 27, 2001	Kitazawa Town Hall	Tokyo, Japan
98	Shooto: Gig West 2	September 23, 2001	Namba Grand Kagetsu Studio	Osaka, Kansai, Japan
97	Shooto: To The Top 8	September 2, 2001	Korakuen Hall	Tokyo, Japan
96	Shooto: To The Top 7	August 26, 2001	Osaka Prefectural Gymnasium	Osaka, Kansai, Japan
95	Shooto: Gig East 5	August 15, 2001	Kitazawa Town Hall	Tokyo, Japan
94	Shooto: Gig East 4	July 27, 2001	Kitazawa Town Hall	Tokyo, Japan
93	Shooto: To The Top 6	July 6, 2001	Korakuen Hall	Tokyo, Japan
92	Shooto: To The Top 5	June 30, 2001	Kitazawa Town Hall	Setagaya, Tokyo, Japan
91	Shooto: Gig East 3	June 14, 2001	Kitazawa Town Hall	Tokyo, Japan
90	Shooto: Gig East 2	May 22, 2001	Kitazawa Town Hall	Tokyo, Japan
89	Shooto: To The Top 4	May 1, 2001	Korakuen Hall	Tokyo, Japan
88	Shooto: Gig East 1	April 28, 2001	Kitazawa Town Hall	Tokyo, Japan
87	Shooto: Wanna Shooto 2001	April 8, 2001	Kitazawa Town Hall	Setagaya, Tokyo, Japan
86	Shooto: To The Top 3	March 21, 2001	Kitazawa Town Hall	Setagaya, Tokyo, Japan
85	Shooto: To The Top 2	March 2, 2001	Korakuen Hall	Tokyo, Japan
84	Shooto: Gig West 1	February 18, 2001	Namba Grand Kagetsu Studio	Osaka, Kansai, Japan
83	Shooto: To The Top 1	January 19, 2001	Korakuen Hall	Tokyo, Japan

== Shooto: To The Top 1 ==
Shooto: To The Top 1 was an event held on January 19, 2001, at Korakuen Hall in Tokyo, Japan.

=== Results ===
Main Card
Weight class				Method	Round	Time	Notes
	Naoya Uematsu	def.	Mike Cardoso	Decision (Unanimous)	3	5:00
	Akihiro Gono	def.	Ivan Salaverry	KO (Spinning Back Kick)	1	3:06
	Tetsuo Katsuta	def.	Baret Yoshida	Decision (Unanimous)	3	5:00
	Hiroaki Yoshioka	def.	Takeyasu Hirono	Draw	3	5:00
	Ryan Bow	def.	Tony DeDolph	Submission (Armbar)	1	2:21
	Katsuya Toida	def.	Hisao Ikeda	Decision (Unanimous)	3	5:00
	Masahiro Oishi	def.	Masaki Nishizawa	TKO (Punches)	1	4:12
	Takaharu Murahama	def.	Yohei Nanbu	Decision (Unanimous)	2	5:00
	Daiji Takahashi	def.	Yasuhiro Urushitani	Decision (Unanimous)	2	5:00
	Hideki Kadowaki	def.	Takuhito Hida	Decision (Unanimous)	2	5:00
	Ryota Matsune	def.	Nobuyuki Kato	Decision (Unanimous)	2	5:00
	Toshiteru Ishii	def.	Tomohiro Hashi	Decision (Unanimous)	2	5:00

== Shooto: Gig West 1 ==
Shooto: Gig West 1 was an event held on February 18, 2001, at the Namba Grand Kagetsu Studio in Osaka, Japan.

=== Results ===
Main Card
Weight class				Method	Round	Time	Notes
	Seichi Ikemoto	def.	Takayuki Okochi	KO (Knees)	1	4:01
	Isao Tanimura	def.	Yuji Kusu	Decision (Unanimous)	2	5:00
	Takumi Nakayama	def.	Chikara Miyake	Decision (Unanimous)	2	5:00
	Hiroshi Umemura	vs.	Masashi Kameda	Draw	2	5:00
	Jun Kitagawa	def.	Masashi Kita	Decision (Unanimous)	2	5:00
	Yoshihiro Fujita	def.	Koichi Tanaka	Technical Submission (Armbar)	1	3:58
	Daisuke Sugie	def.	Tsutomu Shiiki	Decision (Majority)	2	5:00

== Shooto: To The Top 2 ==
Shooto: To The Top 2 was an event held on March 2, 2001, at Korakuen Hall in Tokyo, Japan.

=== Results ===
Main Card
Weight class				Method	Round	Time	Notes
	Mamoru Yamaguchi	def.	Gildo Lima	Submission (Armbar)	1	3:57
	Anderson Silva	def.	Tetsuji Kato	Decision (Unanimous)	3	5:00
	Ryan Bow	def.	Kohei Yasumi	Decision (Unanimous)	3	5:00
	Masahiro Oishi	def.	Yoshinobu Ota	Submission (Rear Naked Choke)	2	2:48
	Jutaro Nakao	def.	Thomas Denny	Submission (Strangle Choke)	3	3:09
	Koji Takeuchi	vs.	Hideki Kadowaki	Draw	2	5:00
	Norifumi Yamamoto	def.	Masato Shiozawa	Decision (Unanimous)	2	5:00

== Shooto: To The Top 3 ==
Shooto: To The Top 3 was an event held on March 21, 2001, at Kitazawa Town Hall in Setagaya, Tokyo, Japan.

=== Results ===
Main Card
Weight class				Method	Round	Time	Notes
	Jin Akimoto	def.	Hiroaki Yoshioka	Decision (Unanimous)	3	5:00
	Takumi Nakayama	def.	Ian James Schaffa	Decision (Unanimous)	2	5:00
	Mitsuo Matsumoto	def.	Takashi Ochi	Decision (Unanimous)	2	5:00
	Ryota Matsune	def.	Tomoharu Umezawa	Submission (Toe Hold)	2	2:41
	Toshiteru Ishii	def.	Katsuhisa Akasaki	DQ (Kneeing to the Head on the Ground)	2	2:46
	Yasuhiro Urushitani	def.	Homare Kuboyama	Decision (Unanimous)	2	5:00

== Shooto: Wanna Shooto 2001 ==
Shooto: Wanna Shooto 2001 was an event held on April 8, 2001, at Kitazawa Town Hall in Setagaya, Tokyo, Japan.

=== Results ===
Main Card
Weight class				Method	Round	Time	Notes
	Hiroshi Tsuruya	vs.	Kim Mason	Draw	2	5:00
	Shiko Yamashita	def.	Jeremy Bennett	Submission (Punches)	2	2:36
	Kentaro Imaizumi	def.	Daiji Takahashi	Decision (Unanimous)	2	5:00
	Makoto Ishikawa	def.	Eugene Hynson	Submission (Armbar)	2	4:42
	Takuhito Hida	def.	Roemer Trumpert	Decision (Unanimous)	2	5:00
	Eiji Murayama	def.	Akitoshi Tamura	Technical Decision (Unanimous)	2	0:00
	Shuichiro Katsumura	def.	Ryan Diaz	Decision (Unanimous)	2	5:00
	Isao Tanimura	def.	Rodney Ellis	Decision (Majority)	2	5:00
	Tatsuya Kawajiri	vs.	Yohei Suzuki	Draw	2	5:00
	Kazumichi Takada	def.	Masa Marcome	Submission (Rear Naked Choke)	1	4:35
	Shinobu Ito	def.	Martijn Meenhuis	Submission (Rear Naked Choke)	1	4:16
	Hiroki Kotani	vs.	Takeshi Yamazaki	Draw	2	5:00

== Shooto: Gig East 1 ==
Shooto: Gig East 1 was an event held on April 28, 2001, at Kitazawa Town Hall in Tokyo, Japan.

=== Results ===
Main Card
Weight class				Method	Round	Time	Notes
	Kazuya Abe	vs.	Kazuhiro Inoue	Draw	2	5:00
	Masato Fujiwara	def.	Masakazu Kuramochi	TKO (Cut)	1	1:01
	Ryota Matsune	def.	Hiroyasu Kodera	Decision (Unanimous)	2	5:00
	Yoshihiro Fujita	def.	Katsuhisa Akasaki	Submission (Kimura)	1	5:00
	Shigetoshi Iwase	def.	Yoshifumi Dogaki	Decision (Unanimous)	2	5:00
	Yasuyuki Tokuoka	def.	Toru Nakayama	Decision (Unanimous)	2	5:00

== Shooto: To The Top 4 ==
Shooto: To The Top 4 was an event held on May 1, 2001, at Korakuen Hall in Tokyo, Japan.

=== Results ===
Main Card
Weight class				Method	Round	Time	Notes
	Tetsuo Katsuta	def.	Alexandre Franca Nogueira	Decision (Majority)	3	5:00
	Akihiro Gono	vs.	Murilo Rua	Draw (Majority)	3	5:00
	Katsuya Toida	def.	Osmar Diaz Fernandez	Technical Submission (Armbar)	1	0:37
	Toniko Junior	vs.	Takaharu Murahama	Draw	2	5:00

== Shooto: Gig East 2 ==
Shooto: Gig East 2 was an event held on May 22, 2001, at Kitazawa Town Hall in Tokyo, Japan.

=== Results ===
Main Card
Weight class				Method	Round	Time	Notes
	Takayuki Okochi	def.	Tomonori Ohara	Decision (Unanimous)	2	5:00
	Daiji Takahashi	def.	Hiroshi Umemura	Submission (Rear-Naked Choke)	2	3:51
	Masato Fujiwara	vs.	Daisuke Sugie	Draw	2	5:00
	Tatsuya Kawajiri	def.	Yohei Suzuki	Submission (Rear-Naked Choke)	1	2:42
	Seiji Ozuka	def.	Yoshihiro Fujita	Decision (Unanimous)	2	5:00

== Shooto: Gig East 3 ==
Shooto: Gig East 3 was an event held on December 17, 2001, at Kitazawa Town Hall in Tokyo, Japan.

=== Results ===
Main Card
Weight class				Method	Round	Time	Notes
	Shiko Yamashita	def.	Ryuta Sakurai	Decision (Unanimous)	2	5:00
	Hiroshi Tsuruya	def.	Shigetoshi Iwase	Decision (Unanimous)	2	5:00
	Makoto Ishikawa	def.	Koichi Tanaka	Decision (Unanimous)	2	5:00
	Kentaro Imaizumi	def.	Ryota Matsune	Decision (Unanimous)	2	5:00
	Naoki Matsushita	def.	Takuhito Hida	Decision (Unanimous)	2	5:00

== Shooto: To The Top 5 ==
Shooto: To The Top 5 was an event held on June 30, 2001, at Kitazawa Town Hall in Setagaya, Tokyo, Japan.

=== Results ===
Main Card
Weight class				Method	Round	Time	Notes
	Takumi Nakayama	def.	Charlie Pearson	Decision (Majority)	2	5:00
	Takuya Wada	def.	Isao Tanimura	Decision (Unanimous)	2	5:00
	Hiroki Kotani	def.	Takashi Ochi	Decision (Unanimous)	2	5:00
	Takeshi Yamazaki	def.	Koji Takeuchi	Decision (Majority)	2	5:00
	Seiji Ozuka	def.	Katsuhisa Akasaki	Decision (Split)	2	5:00
	Homare Kuboyama	def.	Junji Ikoma	Decision (Unanimous)	2	5:00

== Shooto: To The Top 6 ==
Shooto: To The Top 6 was an event held on July 6, 2001, at Korakuen Hall in Tokyo, Japan.

=== Results ===
Main Card
Weight class				Method	Round	Time	Notes
	Katsuya Toida	def.	Baret Yoshida	Decision (Majority)	3	5:00
	Tetsuji Kato	def.	Ray Cooper	Decision (Unanimous)	3	5:00
	Izuru Takeuchi	def.	Martijn de Jong	Decision (Split)	3	5:00
	Stephen Palling	def.	Kimihito Nonaka	Decision (Unanimous)	3	5:00
	Daisuke Sugie	def.	Mitsuhiro Ishida	Decision (Unanimous)	2	5:00
	Norifumi Yamamoto	def.	Masashi Kameda	KO (Punch)	1	4:17

== Shooto: Gig East 4 ==
Shooto: Gig East 4 was an event held on July 27, 2001, at Kitazawa Town Hall in Tokyo, Japan.

=== Results ===
Main Card
Weight class				Method	Round	Time	Notes
	Takumi Nakayama	def.	Takaharu Murahama	Technical Decision (Unanimous)	2	0:00
	Takeshi Yamazaki	def.	Masato Fujiwara	Decision (Unanimous)	2	5:00
	Jun Kitagawa	def.	Tomoki Kanuka	Decision (Unanimous)	2	5:00
	Kenichiro Togashi	def.	Tsutomu Shiiki	Decision (Majority)	2	5:00
	Akihiko Adachi	def.	Jun Ishii	Decision (Majority)	2	5:00

== Shooto: Gig East 5 ==
Shooto: Gig East 5 was an event held on August 15, 2001, at The Kitazawa Town Hall in Tokyo, Japan.

=== Results ===
Main Card
Weight class				Method	Round	Time	Notes
	Hiroaki Yoshioka	def.	Kentaro Imaizumi	Decision (Unanimous)	3	5:00
	Ryota Matsune	def.	Hiroshi Umemura	Decision (Unanimous)	2	5:00
	Yohei Suzuki	def.	Masakazu Kuramochi	Decision (Unanimous)	2	5:00
	Akitoshi Tamura	def.	Koichi Tanaka	Decision (Unanimous)	2	5:00
	Naoto Kojima	def.	Naoki Matsushita	Decision (Unanimous)	2	5:00

== Shooto: To The Top 7 ==
Shooto: To The Top 7 was an event held on August 26, 2001, at The Osaka Prefectural Gymnasium in Osaka, Japan.

=== Results ===
Main Card
Weight class				Method	Round	Time	Notes
Middleweight	Anderson Silva	def.	Hayato Sakurai	Decision (Unanimous)	3	5:00	(Note: For The Middleweight Champion.)
	Rumina Sato	def.	Marcio Ramos Barbosa	Decision (Unanimous)	3	5:00
	Masanori Suda	vs.	Larry Papadopoulos	Draw	3	5:00
	Steve Berger	def.	Seichi Ikemoto	Submission (Triangle Armbar)	3	2:09
	Ichaku Murata	def.	Yoshihiro Fujita	Submission (Guillotine Choke)	1	1:08
	Yasuyuki Tokuoka	def.	Tomonori Ohara	Technical Submission (Armbar)	1	2:37

== Shooto: To The Top 8 ==
Shooto: To The Top 8 was an event held on September 2, 2001, at Korakuen Hall in Tokyo, Japan.

=== Results ===
Main Card
Weight class				Method	Round	Time	Notes
Featherweight	Alexandre Franca Nogueira (c)	def.	Tetsuo Katsuta	Submission (Guillotine Choke)	2	2:45	(Note: For The Featherweight Champion.)
	Jin Akimoto	def.	Takeyasu Hirono	Decision (Unanimous)	3	5:00
	Shiko Yamashita	def.	Leopoldo Serao	Decision (Majority)	3	5:00
	Takumi Nakayama	def.	Bruno Queroy	Decision (Unanimous)	2	5:00
	Kazuhiro Inoue	def.	Flavio Santiago	Decision (Unanimous)	2	5:00
	Kazuya Abe	def.	Makoto Ishikawa	KO (Punch)	1	0:29
	Norifumi Yamamoto	def.	Hideki Kadowaki	TKO (Punches)	1	4:02

== Shooto: Gig West 2 ==
Shooto: Gig West 2 was an event held on September 23, 2001, at The Namba Grand Kagetsu Studio in Osaka, Japan.

=== Results ===
Main Card
Weight class				Method	Round	Time	Notes
	Daisuke Sugie	def.	Takaharu Murahama	Submission (Armbar)	1	1:32
	Kaichi Tsuji	def.	Katsuhiko Ochiai	Decision (Majority)	2	5:00
	Tsutomu Shiiki	def.	Ken Omatsu	Decision (Majority)	2	5:00
	Hiroshi Komatsu	def.	Koichi Tanaka	Decision (Unanimous)	2	5:00
	Tomohiro Hashi	def.	Junji Ikoma	Decision (Unanimous)	2	5:00
	Yoshifumi Dogaki	vs.	Hirofumi Hara	Draw	2	5:00

== Shooto: To The Top 9 ==
Shooto: To The Top 9 was an event held on September 27, 2001, at The Kitazawa Town Hall in Tokyo, Japan.

=== Results ===
Main Card
Weight class				Method	Round	Time	Notes
	Takuya Wada	def.	Jason Buck	Decision (Majority)	2	5:00
	Isao Tanimura	def.	Shigetoshi Iwase	Decision (Majority)	2	5:00
	Hiroshi Tsuruya	def.	Koji Takeuchi	Decision (Unanimous)	2	5:00
	Tatsuya Kawajiri	def.	Kazumichi Takada	Technical Submission (Triangle Armbar)	1	3:03
	Yasuhiro Urushitani	def.	Katsuhisa Akasaki	Decision (Majority)	2	5:00
	Homare Kuboyama	def.	Toshiteru Ishii	Decision (Unanimous)	2	5:00
	Mitsuhiro Ishida	def.	Hiroki Kotani	Decision (Unanimous)	2	5:00

== Shooto: Gig East 6 ==
Shooto: Gig East 6 was an event held on October 23, 2001, at The Kitazawa Town Hall in Tokyo, Japan.

=== Results ===
Main Card
Weight class				Method	Round	Time	Notes
	Ryota Matsune	def.	Daiji Takahashi	Decision (Majority)	2	5:00
	Takeshi Yamazaki	def.	Daisuke Sugie	Submission (Armbar)	2	3:44
	Kuniyoshi Hironaka	def.	Takayuki Okochi	Decision (Unanimous)	2	5:00
	Akira Komatsu	vs.	Noriyuki Yokoyama	Draw	2	5:00

== Shooto: To The Top 10 ==
Shooto: To The Top 10 was an event held on November 25, 2001, at The Differ Ariake Arena in Tokyo, Japan.

=== Results ===
Main Card
Weight class				Method	Round	Time	Notes
Bantamweight	Masahiro Oishi	def.	Mamoru Yamaguchi	Submission (Triangle Armbar)	1	1:44	(Note: For The Bantamweight Champion.)
	Izuru Takeuchi	vs.	Martijn de Jong	Draw	3	5:00
	Kentaro Imaizumi	def.	Takeyasu Hirono	Decision (Unanimous)	3	5:00
	Hiroyuki Abe	def.	Kazuhiro Inoue	TKO (Doctor Stoppage)	1	4:00
	Masato Fujiwara	def.	Koji Takeuchi	Decision (Unanimous)	2	5:00
	Homare Kuboyama	def.	Tomohiro Hashi	Decision (Unanimous)	2	5:00
	Masakazu Kuramochi	def.	Takuhito Hida	Decision (Majority)	2	5:00
	Naoki Matsushita	vs.	Kenichiro Togashi	Draw	2	5:00

== Shooto: Gig East 7 ==
Shooto: Gig East 7 was an event held on November 26, 2001, at The Kitazawa Town Hall in Tokyo, Japan.

=== Results ===
Main Card
Weight class				Method	Round	Time	Notes
	Hisao Ikeda	def.	Ichaku Murata	Decision (Unanimous)	3	5:00
	Hiroshi Umemura	vs.	Seiji Ozuka	Draw	2	5:00
	Mitsuhiro Ishida	def.	Naoto Kojima	TKO (Punches)	2	1:58
	Hiroki Kita	def.	Akira Kibe	Decision (Majority)	2	5:00
	Akihiko Adachi	def.	Kassim Annan	Submission (Rear Naked Choke)	1	3:46
	Kotetsu Boku	def.	Marc Duncan	Submission (Armbar)	2	3:15

== Shooto: To The Top Final Act ==
Shooto: To The Top Final Act was an event held on December 16, 2001, at The Tokyo Bay NK Hall in Urayasu, Chiba, Japan.

=== Results ===
Main Card
Weight class				Method	Round	Time	Notes
Lightweight	Takanori Gomi	def.	Rumina Sato	Decision (Unanimous)	3	5:00	(Note: For The Lightweight Champion.)
Featherweight	Alexandre Franca Nogueira (c)	def.	Katsuya Toida	Decision (Unanimous)	3	5:00	(Note: For The Featherweight Champion.)
	Hayato Sakurai	def.	Dan Gilbert	Submission (Heel Hook)	1	1:52
	Dokonjonosuke Mishima	def.	Ryan Bow	Decision (Majority)	3	5:00
	Jutaro Nakao	def.	Takuya Wada	Submission (Triangle Choke)	1	4:07
	Tetsuji Kato	def.	Seichi Ikemoto	Decision (Unanimous)	3	5:00
	Marcio Ramos Barbosa	def.	Takumi Nakayama	TKO (Guillotine Choke)	1	0:32

== See also ==
- Shooto
- List of Shooto champions
- List of Shooto Events
