= Yoshihiro Fujita (fighter) =

Japanese mixed martial artist

Yoshihiro Fujita 藤田芳弘
- Born: October 24, 1969 (age 56); Japan
- Nationality: Japanese
- Height: 5 ft 8 in (1.73 m)
- Weight: 132 lb (60 kg; 9.4 st)
- Division: Bantamweight
- Team: Paraestra Hiroshima
- Years active: 1997 - 2003

Mixed martial arts record
- Total: 9
- Wins: 2
- By submission: 2
- Losses: 6
- By submission: 2
- By decision: 4
- Draws: 1

Other information
- Mixed martial arts record from Sherdog

Yoshihiro Fujita (Japanese: 藤田芳弘; born October 24, 1969) is a Japanese mixed martial artist. He competed in the Bantamweight division.

== Mixed martial arts record ==
Professional record breakdown
10 matches	2 wins	6 losses
By submission	2	2
By decision	0	4
Draws	2	

Res.	Record	Opponent	Method	Event	Date	Round	Time	Location	Notes
Loss	2–6–1	Hiroyuki Tanaka	Decision (unanimous)	Shooto 2003: 6/27 in Hiroshima Sun Plaza	June 27, 2003	2	5:00	Hiroshima, Japan	
Loss	2–5–1	Ichaku Murata	Submission (guillotine choke)	Shooto: To The Top 7	August 26, 2001	1	1:08	Osaka, Japan	
Loss	2–4–1	Seiji Ozuka	Decision (unanimous)	Shooto: Gig East 2	May 22, 2001	2	5:00	Tokyo, Japan	
Win	2–3–1	Katsuhisa Akasaki	Submission (kimura)	Shooto: Gig East 1	April 28, 2001	1	5:00	Tokyo, Japan	
Win	1–3–1	Koichi Tanaka	Technical Submission (armbar)	Shooto: Gig West 1	February 18, 2001	1	3:58	Osaka, Japan	
Draw	0–3–1	Masashi Kameda	Draw	Shooto: R.E.A.D. 8	August 4, 2000	2	5:00	Osaka, Japan	
Loss	0–3	Yoshiyuki Takayama	Decision (majority)	Shooto: Gig '98 2nd	July 18, 1998	2	5:00	Tokyo, Japan	
Loss	0–2	Masahiro Oishi	Technical Submission (kimura)	Shooto: Las Grandes Viajes 2	March 1, 1998	1	2:40	Tokyo, Japan	
Loss	0–1	Mitsuo Matsumoto	Decision (unanimous)	Lumax Cup: Tournament of J '97 Lightweight Tournament	December 20, 1997	2	3:00	Japan	

== See also ==
- List of male mixed martial artists
