= Ray Cooper (fighter) =

American mixed martial arts fighter

Ray Cooper Jr.
- Born: Raynald Cooper; November 19, 1973 (age 52); Waipahu, Hawaii, United States
- Other names: Bradda
- Nationality: American
- Height: 5 ft 7 in (1.70 m)
- Weight: 155 lb (70 kg; 11.1 st)
- Division: Light Heavyweight; Middleweight; Welterweight; Lightweight
- Fighting out of: Waipahu, Hawaii, United States
- Team: Jesus Is Lord
- Years active: 1997–2008

Mixed martial arts record
- Total: 23
- Wins: 14
- By knockout: 8
- By submission: 3
- By decision: 3
- Losses: 9
- By knockout: 2
- By submission: 6
- By decision: 1

Other information
- Mixed martial arts record from Sherdog

Raynald "Ray" Cooper Jr. is an American former fighter. During his career, he holds notable upset victories over Jake Shields, Antonio McKee, and Hermes Franca. A professional competitor for promotions in his native Hawaii and Shooto from 1997 until 2008. His son, Ray Cooper III, is also a professional fighter.

== Championships and accomplishments ==
=== Mixed martial arts ===
- Warriors Quest
  - Warriors Quest Welterweight Champion (One time, first)
    - Two successful title defenses
  - Warriors Quest Lightweight Champion (One time, first)
    - One successful title defenses
- SuperBrawl
  - SuperBrawl 3 Tournament Champion

== Mixed martial arts record ==
Professional record breakdown
23 matches	14 wins	9 losses
By knockout	8	2
By submission	3	6
By decision	3	1

Res.	Record	Opponent	Method	Event	Date	Round	Time	Location	Notes
Loss	14–9	Richie Whitson	KO (punch)	X-1: Legends	May 16, 2008	1	3:54	Honolulu, Hawaii, United States	For the X-1 Lightweight Championship.
Win	14–8	Koji Yoshida	TKO (punches)	Rumble on the Rock 9	April 21, 2006	1	2:47	Honolulu, Hawaii, United States	
Loss	13–8	Takashi Nakakura	TKO (doctor stoppage)	Shooto: 5/4 in Korakuen Hall	May 4, 2005	2	1:14	Tokyo, Japan	
Win	13–7	Hermes Franca	KO (punches)	Shooto Hawaii: Unleashed	March 25, 2005	1	2:57	Honolulu, Hawaii, United States	
Loss	12–7	Jake Shields	Submission (rear-naked choke)	Shooto Hawaii: Soljah Fight Night	July 9, 2004	1	3:29	Honolulu, Hawaii, United States	For the vacant Shooto Welterweight Championship.
Loss	12–6	Dennis Hallman	Submission (guillotine choke)	Rumble on the Rock 4	October 10, 2003	1	0:43	Honolulu, Hawaii, United States	
Win	12–5	Jason Buck	Decision (unanimous)	Shooto Hawaii: Alpha	December 7, 2002	3	5:00	Lahaina, Hawaii, United States	
Win	11–5	Jake Shields	Decision (majority)	Warriors Quest 6: Best of the Best	August 3, 2002	3	5:00	Honolulu, Hawaii, United States	Defended the Warriors Quest Welterweight Championship.
Win	10–5	Dan Gilbert	TKO (submission to punches)	Warriors Quest 4: Genesis	March 29, 2002	1	2:02	Honolulu, Hawaii, United States	Defended the Warriors Quest Welterweight Championship.
Win	9–5	Jeremy Bennett	TKO (corner stoppage)	Warriors Quest 3: Punishment in Paradise	December 1, 2001	1	0:51	Honolulu, Hawaii, United States	Defended the Warriors Quest Lightweight Championship.
Win	8–5	Jeremy Williams	TKO (strikes)	Warriors Quest 2: Battle of Champions	August 1, 2001	1	3:16	Kailua-Kona, Hawaii, United States	Won the Warriors Quest Welterweight Championship.
Loss	7–5	Tetsuji Kato	Decision (unanimous)	Shooto: To The Top 6	July 6, 2001	3	5:00	Tokyo, Japan	
Win	7–4	Antonio McKee	Submission (armbar)	Warriors Quest 1: The New Beginning	May 29, 2001	1	0:54	Honolulu, Hawaii, United States	Won the Warriors Quest Lightweight Championship.
Loss	6–4	Paul Rodriguez	Submission (armbar)	SuperBrawl 20	February 23, 2001	1	1:55	Honolulu, Hawaii, United States	
Loss	6–3	Alex Cook	Submission (neck crank)	Shooto: R.E.A.D. Final	December 17, 2000	1	1:44	Urayasu, Japan	
Loss	6–2	Frank Trigg	Submission (forearm choke)	WEF: New Blood Conflict	August 26, 2000	2	3:05		
Win	6–1	Jutaro Nakao	Decision (unanimous)	Shooto: R.E.A.D. 1	January 14, 2000	3	5:00	Tokyo, Japan	
Win	5–1	Chris Kirby	TKO (punches)	SuperBrawl 14	November 5, 1999	1	1:34	Mangilao, Guam	
Win	4–1	Danny Bennett	Submission (armbar)	SuperBrawl 13	September 7, 1999	1	2:43	Honolulu, Hawaii, United States	
Win	3–1	Victor Hunsaker	TKO (punches)	SuperBrawl 12	June 1, 1999	1	0:46	Honolulu, Hawaii, United States	
Loss	2–1	Masanori Suda	Submission (armbar)	Shooto: Las Grandes Viajes 1	January 17, 1998	1	1:55	Tokyo, Japan	
Win	2–0	Jason Nicholsen	TKO (corner stoppage)	SuperBrawl 3	January 17, 1997	1	0:28	Honolulu, Hawaii, United States	Won the SuperBrawl 3 Tournament.
Win	1–0	Taro Obata	KO (punches)	SuperBrawl 3	January 17, 1997	1	1:16	Honolulu, Hawaii, United States	

== See also ==
- List of male mixed martial artists
