= Shiko Yamashita =

Japanese mixed martial arts fighter

- Born: December 22, 1973 (age 52); Japan
- Nationality: Japanese
- Height: 5 ft 7 in (1.70 m)
- Weight: 170 lb (77 kg; 12 st)
- Division: Middleweight; Welterweight
- Style: Judo, BJJ
- Team: Paraestra Sapporo
- Rank: 4th dan Black belt in Judo
- Years active: 1999 - 2009

Mixed martial arts record
- Total: 18
- Wins: 10
- By knockout: 1
- By submission: 3
- By decision: 5
- Unknown: 1
- Losses: 5
- By submission: 1
- By decision: 4
- Draws: 3

Other information
- Mixed martial arts record from Sherdog

Shiko Yamashita (born December 22, 1973) is a Japanese mixed martial artist. He competed in the welterweight and middleweight divisions.

== Mixed martial arts record ==
Professional record breakdown
18 matches	10 wins	5 losses
By knockout	1	0
By submission	3	1
By decision	5	4
Unknown	1	0
Draws	3	

Res.	Record	Opponent	Method	Event	Date	Round	Time	Location	Notes
Loss	10-5-3	Takuya Wada	Submission (Rear-Naked Choke)	Shooto: Revolutionary Exchanges 3	November 23, 2009	3	4:26	Tokyo, Japan	
Loss	10-4-3	Motoki Miyazawa	Decision (Unanimous)	GCM: Cage Force 7	June 22, 2008	3	5:00	Tokyo, Japan	Return to Welterweight.
Loss	10-3-3	Siyar Bahadurzada	Decision (Unanimous)	Shooto: Back To Our Roots 4	July 15, 2007	3	5:00	Tokyo, Japan	
Win	10-2-3	Grazhuydas Smailis	DQ (Grabbing the Ropes)	Shooto 2006: 9/8 in Korakuen Hall	September 8, 2006	2	3:21	Tokyo, Japan	
Win	9-2-3	Dustin Denes	Decision (Unanimous)	AFC 16: Absolute Fighting Championships 16	April 22, 2006	3	5:00	Boca Raton, Florida, United States	
Win	8-2-3	David Bielkheden	Decision (Majority)	Shooto: 4/23 in Hakata Star Lanes	April 23, 2005	3	5:00	Hakata-ku, Fukuoka, Japan	
Draw	7-2-3	Martijn de Jong	Draw	Shooto: 5/4 in Korakuen Hall	May 4, 2003	3	5:00	Tokyo, Japan	
Draw	7-2-2	Dustin Denes	Technical Draw	Shooto: 2/23 in Korakuen Hall	February 23, 2003	1	3:48	Tokyo, Japan	
Draw	7-2-1	Scott Henze	Draw	HOOKnSHOOT: Relentless	May 25, 2002	3	5:00	Evansville, Indiana, United States	Return to Middleweight.
Win	7-2	Jun Kitagawa	Decision (Majority)	Shooto: Treasure Hunt 5	March 15, 2002	2	5:00	Tokyo, Japan	
Loss	6-2	Curtis Stout	Decision (Unanimous)	HOOKnSHOOT: Kings 1	November 17, 2001	2	5:00	Evansville, Indiana, United States	
Win	6-1	Leopoldo Serao	Decision (Majority)	Shooto: To The Top 8	September 2, 2001	3	5:00	Tokyo, Japan	
Win	5-1	Ryuta Sakurai	Decision (Unanimous)	Shooto: Gig East 3	June 14, 2001	2	5:00	Tokyo, Japan	
Win	4-1	Jeremy Bennett	Submission (Punches)	Shooto: Wanna Shooto 2001	April 8, 2001	2	2:36	Setagaya, Tokyo, Japan	
Win	3-1	Matthias Riccio	Submission (Armbar)	Shooto: R.E.A.D. 11	October 9, 2000	1	1:18	Setagaya, Tokyo, Japan	Return to Welterweight.
Loss	2-1	Izuru Takeuchi	Decision (Unanimous)	Shooto: R.E.A.D. 1	January 14, 2000	2	5:00	Tokyo, Japan	Middleweight debut.
Win	2-0	Ryota Ibaraki	Submission (Armbar)	Shooto: Shooter's Ambition	October 6, 1999	1	2:15	Setagaya, Tokyo, Japan	
Win	1-0	Koichiro Kawaguchi	TKO (Armbar)	Daidojuku: WARS 5	April 8, 1999	3	0:34	Japan	

== See also ==
- List of male mixed martial artists
