= Seichi Ikemoto =

Japanese mixed martial artist

- Born: August 24, 1975 (age 51); Matsubara, Osaka, Japan
- Nationality: Japanese
- Height: 5 ft 11 in (1.80 m)
- Weight: 155 lb (70 kg; 11.1 st)
- Division: Welterweight; Lightweight
- Reach: 76 in (193 cm)
- Style: Kickboxing，Boxing, Wrestling, Shoot wrestling, Karate, Judo
- Stance: Orthodox
- Fighting out of: Tokyo, Japan
- Team: Team Boon!
- Years active: 1999–2013

Kickboxing record
- Total: 1
- Losses: 1
- By knockout: 1

Mixed martial arts record
- Total: 45
- Wins: 21
- By knockout: 8
- By submission: 4
- By decision: 9
- Losses: 19
- By knockout: 2
- By submission: 6
- By decision: 11
- Draws: 5

Other information
- Mixed martial arts record from Sherdog

Seichi Ikemoto (Japanese: 池本誠知; born August 24, 1975) is a Japanese mixed martial artist and professional wrestler. He is a veteran of Shooto, PRIDE and DEEP. His specialty is a "double punch", in which he puts his hands together and throws them at his opponent.

== Biography and career ==
Ikemoto is a former holder of the DEEP Welterweight championship, which he obtained by defeating Hidehiko Hasegawa at DEEP 36 via unanimous decision. He lost the title by dropping a unanimous decision to Yuya Shirai at DEEP 45 in January 2010.

Ikemoto was a participant in the Dream Welterweight Grand Prix and lost his first-round matchup against Marius Zaromskis by unanimous decision at Dream.8. The fight is most famous for Zaromskis backflipping onto Ikemoto, almost getting caught in a leg lock in the process.

On November 8, 2010, he made his kickboxing debut against veteran fighter Yuya Yamamoto at K-1 World MAX 2010 Final, and lost via knockout in the first round.

Ikemoto lost his retirement fight to Japanese MMA legend Ryo Chonan on April 28, 2013, at Deep: Osaka Impact 2013.

Ikemoto is occasionally a professional wrestler and had appeared for All Japan Pro Wrestling and GLEAT.

== Championships and accomplishments ==
- Deep
  - Deep Welterweight Championship (One time)
  - One Successful Title Defense

== Mixed martial arts record ==
Professional record breakdown
45 matches	21 wins	19 losses
By knockout	8	2
By submission	4	6
By decision	9	11
Draws	5	

Res.	Record	Opponent	Method	Event	Date	Round	Time	Location	Notes
Loss	21–19–5	Ryo Chonan	Decision (unanimous)	Deep: Osaka Impact 2013	April 28, 2013	3	5:00	Tokyo, Japan	Catchweight (165 lb) bout.
Win	21–18–5	Yuki Ito	TKO (corner stoppage)	Deep: Osaka Impact 2012	September 29, 2012	2	2:29	Tokyo, Japan	
Loss	20–18–5	Mizuto Hirota	Decision (unanimous)	Deep: 57 Impact	February 18, 2012	3	5:00	Tokyo, Japan	Return to Lightweight; for the Deep Lightweight Championship.
Win	20–17–5	Hiroki Aoki	Decision (unanimous)	Deep: Osaka Impact	September 4, 2011	3	5:00	Osaka, Japan	
Win	19–17–5	Naoki Matsushita	Decision (majority)	Deep: Cage Impact 2010 in Osaka	June 6, 2010	3	5:00	Osaka, Japan	
Loss	18–17–5	Yuya Shirai	Decision (unanimous)	Deep: 45 Impact	January 24, 2010	3	5:00	Osaka, Japan	Lost the Deep Welterweight Championship.
Loss	18–16–5	Tarec Saffiedine	Decision (unanimous)	DREAM.10	July 20, 2009	2	5:00	Saitama, Japan	Reserve Bout for Dream Welterweight Grand Prix.
Loss	18–15–5	Marius Žaromskis	Decision (unanimous)	DREAM.8	April 5, 2009	2	5:00	Nagoya, Japan	DREAM Welterweight Grand Prix Opening Round.
Win	18–14–5	Hidetaka Monma	TKO (knee to the body and punches)	Deep: 40 Impact	February 20, 2009	1	1:42	Tokyo, Japan	Defended the Deep Welterweight Championship.
Win	17–14–5	Hidehiko Hasegawa	Decision (unanimous)	Deep: 36 Impact	September 27, 2008	3	5:00	Osaka, Japan	Won the Deep Welterweight Championship.
Win	16–14–5	Doo Won Seo	Submission (heel hook)	Deep: Protect Impact 2007	December 22, 2007	1	2:56	Osaka, Japan	
Draw	15–14–5	Kiuma Kunioku	Draw	Deep: 32 Impact	October 10, 2007	2	5:00	Tokyo, Japan	
Win	15–14–4	Tae Hyun Bang	Decision (unanimous)	Deep: 30 Impact	July 8, 2007	3	5:00	Osaka, Japan	Return to Welterweight.
Loss	14–14–4	Daisuke Nakamura	Submission (armbar)	Pride - Bushido 12	August 26, 2006	1	3:36	Nagoya, Japan	
Win	14–13–4	Naoki Matsushita	TKO (cut)	Real Rhythm: 4th Stage	July 30, 2006	1	2:26	Osaka, Japan	
Loss	13–13–4	Yves Edwards	Decision (unanimous)	Pride - Bushido 10	April 2, 2006	2	5:00	Tokyo, Japan	Return to Lightweight.
Loss	13–12–4	Jutaro Nakao	Decision (majority)	Real Rhythm: 3rd Stage	March 4, 2006	3	5:00	Osaka, Japan	
Win	13–11–4	Won Jin Eoh	KO	Real Rhythm: 2nd Stage	November 19, 2005	2	4:58	Osaka, Japan	
Win	12–11–4	Hidehiko Hasegawa	Decision (unanimous)	Deep: 20th Impact	September 3, 2005	3	5:00	Tokyo, Japan	
Loss	11–11–4	Eddie Alvarez	TKO (punches)	Euphoria: USA vs The World	February 26, 2005	2	4:25	Atlantic City, New Jersey, United States	Lightweight bout.
Win	11–10–4	Manabu Hara	Submission (armbar)	RED ZONE: RED ZONE 10	February 13, 2005	1	1:15	Osaka, Japan	
Win	10–10–4	Teruhiko Kubo	Submission (armbar)	Deep: clubDeep Osaka	November 28, 2004	1	4:58	Osaka, Japan	
Win	9–10–4	Motohiro Tachihara	Submission (reverse triangle)	RED ZONE: RED ZONE 9	October 3, 2004	1	2:10	Osaka, Japan	
Loss	8–10–4	Shinya Aoki	Submission (armbar)	Deep: 15th Impact	July 3, 2004	2	0:52	Tokyo, Japan	
Loss	8–9–4	Teruhiko Kubo	KO	RED ZONE: RED ZONE 8	June 4, 2004	1	1:34	Osaka, Japan	
Win	8–8–4	Hiroki Nagaoka	Decision (unanimous)	Deep: 14th Impact	April 18, 2004	3	5:00	Osaka, Japan	
Loss	7-8–4	Hidetaka Monma	Submission (arm-triangle choke)	Deep: 13th Impact	January 22, 2004	2	3:53	Tokyo, Japan	
Win	7–7–4	Hitoyo Kimura	TKO (cut)	Deep: clubDeep Osaka	December 7, 2003	1	5:00	Osaka, Japan	
Draw	6–7–4	Yasuyuki Tokuoka	Draw	Shooto: Gig West 4	October 12, 2003	2	5:00	Osaka, Japan	Lightweight bout.
Win	6–7–3	Kyosuke Sasaki	Decision (unanimous)	Deep: 11th Impact	July 13, 2003	3	5:00	Osaka, Japan	
Loss	5–7–3	Akira Kikuchi	Submission (armbar)	Shooto 2003: 6/27 in Hiroshima Sun Plaza	June 27, 2003	2	1:28	Hiroshima, Japan	
Loss	5–6–3	Shonie Carter	Decision (unanimous)	Shooto: 3/18 in Korakuen Hall	March 18, 2003	3	5:00	Tokyo, Japan	Return to Welterweight.
Win	5–5–3	Shigetoshi Iwase	Decision (majority)	Shooto: Gig West 3	October 27, 2002	2	5:00	Osaka, Japan	
Loss	4–5–3	Dave Strasser	Submission (rear-naked choke)	Shooto: Treasure Hunt 7	June 9, 2002	1	3:10	Osaka, Japan	
Loss	4–4–3	Takuya Wada	Decision (unanimous)	Shooto: Treasure Hunt 3	February 11, 2002	3	5:00	Kobe, Japan	
Loss	4–3–3	Tetsuji Kato	Decision (unanimous)	Shooto: To The Top Final Act	December 16, 2001	3	5:00	Urayasu, Japan	Lightweight bout.
Loss	4–2–3	Steve Berger	Submission (triangle armbar)	Shooto: To The Top 7	August 26, 2001	3	2:09	Osaka, Japan	
Win	4–1–3	Jay Buck	TKO (punches)	HOOKnSHOOT: Masters	May 26, 2001	2	3:03	Evansville, Indiana, United States	Return to Welterweight.
Win	3–1–3	Takayuki Okochi	KO (knees)	Shooto: Gig West 1	February 18, 2001	1	4:01	Osaka, Japan	
Win	2–1–3	Damien Riccio	TKO (punches)	Shooto: R.E.A.D. 11	October 9, 2000	1	2:09	Tokyo, Japan	Welterweight bout.
Draw	1–1–3	Hiroshi Tsuruya	Draw	Shooto: R.E.A.D. 9	August 27, 2000	2	5:00	Yokohama, Japan	
Loss	1–1–2	Saburo Kawakatsu	Decision (unanimous)	Shooto: R.E.A.D. 8	August 4, 2000	2	5:00	Osaka, Japan	Return to Lightweight.
Draw	1–0–2	Takuya Wada	Draw	Shooto: R.E.A.D. 5	May 22, 2000	2	5:00	Tokyo, Japan	
Draw	1–0–1	Yuji Kusu	Draw	Shooto: R.E.A.D. 3	April 2, 2000	2	5:00	Osaka, Japan	Welterweight debut.
Win	1–0	Isao Tanimura	Decision (unanimous)	Shooto: Renaxis 5	October 29, 1999	2	5:00	Osaka, Japan	

== Kickboxing record ==
0 Wins, 1 Loss, 0 Draws
Date	Result	Opponent	Event	Method	Round	Time	Location
November 8, 2010	Loss	(Japan) Yuya Yamamoto	K-1 World MAX 2010 Final	KO	1	2:22	Tokyo, Japan
