= Ryota Matsune =

Japanese mixed martial artist (born 1982)

- Born: March 17, 1982 (age 44); Okinawa, Japan
- Native name: 松根良太
- Nickname: The Shooto Junkie
- Height: 5 ft 3 in (1.60 m)
- Weight: 135 lb (61 kg; 9 st 9 lb)
- Division: Featherweight; Bantamweight; Flyweight
- Stance: Orthodox
- Fighting out of: Chiba, Japan
- Team: Paraestra Ehime
- Rank: Black belt in Brazilian jiu-jitsu
- Years active: 2000–2015

Mixed martial arts record
- Total: 19
- Wins: 16
- By knockout: 1
- By submission: 3
- By decision: 12
- Losses: 2
- By knockout: 1
- By decision: 1
- Draws: 1

Amateur record
- Total: 4
- Wins: 4
- By submission: 1

Other information
- Mixed martial arts record from Sherdog

Ryota Matsune (Japanese: 松根良太, born 17 March 1982) is a Japanese retired mixed martial artist. He competed professionally from 2000 to 2015 and held the Shooto Featherweight (132.3 lbs) title from August 2003 to February 2006.

During his title reign, he was recognized as the best bantamweight in the world, while Fight Matrix ranks him as one of the ten best bantamweights of all time.

== Mixed martial arts career ==
=== Early career ===
Ryota Matsune began his mixed martial arts career in 2000, when he entered the 7th All Japan Tournament, organized by Shooto. He won all four fights of the featherweight tournament. He achieved decision wins over Yasushi Ando, Naoki Tanimoto, Shinobu Kato, as well as a heel hook win over Tomoji Umezawa.

He made his professional debut with the organization a month later, when he faced the Shooto journeyman Katsuhisa Akasaki. The bout was scheduled for two five minute rounds. In the first round Matsune secured a takedown, from which he transitioned to back mount. Akasaki escaped at the very end of the round, with 20 seconds left. In the second round Matsune once again secured a takedown at the beginning of the round, and spent the rest of it in Akasaki's guard. The judges awarded both rounds to Ryota.

In his next fight he faced the debuting Nobuyuki Kato. Matsune looked to limit striking exchanges and take Kato down aiming to control him on the ground. Matsune won a unanimous decision.

During Shooto: To The Top 3 Matsune faced another debuting fighter, Tomoharu Umezawa. During the first round of the bout Umezawa pushed Matsune into the corner of the ring and looked to land short strikes from inside the clinch, as well as landing knees to Matsune's abdomen. Despite Matsune complaining of low blows, the referee didn't stop the action or warn Umezawa. In the second round, Umezawa once again pressured Matsune into the corner, but Ryota rolled for a leg entanglement, and submitted Umezawa by way of a toe hold.

Fighting a debuting fighter for the third time in a row, Matsune was scheduled to fight Hiroyasu Kodera. His winning streak extended to four with a unanimous decision victory. Following this, Ryota was scheduled to fight Kentaro Imaizumi, fighting in the main event for the first time in his career. Matsune was unable to maintain any sustained offense and lost a unanimous decision.

=== Winning streak ===
Following the first loss of his mixed martial arts career, Matsune was scheduled to fight Hiroshi Umemura, who was likewise looking to rebound from a loss. During the first round of their fight, Matsune opened the fight with a leaping hook, to which Umemura responded with a reactive single leg takedown. Matsune managed to scramble back to his feet by utilizing a kimura trap. Matsune spent the rest of the round successfully defending takedowns and landing strikes. In the beginning of the second round, Matsune landed an early high kick, and landed a takedown on a staggered Umemura. After controlling Umemura on the ground for the remainder of the fight, Matsune was awarded a unanimous decision win.

Matsune next fought Daiji Takahashi, with both fighters' most recent win being Hiroshi Umemura. Matsune convincingly won the first round of the fight, mixing striking and grappling, with Takahashi remaining on the defensive for most of the round. In the second round Takahashi pressured Matsune into the ring corner, and clinched up with him. Both fighters found moments of success landing knees and short strikes, with Matsune being unable to escape the clinch due to exhaustion. Matsune won a majority decision, with two of the three judges awarding him the victory (20–19, 20–19, 19–19). Due to the inconclusive nature of their first fight, a rematch was immediately scheduled. Matsune decisively won their rematch, implementing the same gameplan as in the first round of their previous encounter.

Matsune earned his only career TKO win during SuperBrawl 23, against Lincoln Tyler. After a grueling first round, Tyler's corner called the fight off.

Matsune returned to Shooto to face Itchaku Murata during Shooto: Gig East 11. In all three rounds Matsune looked to close distance and use the bodylock to take Murata down. Matsune successfully controlled his opponent on the ground, managing to score a knockdown in the third round as well. Murata won a unanimous decision, with all three judges scoring the third round a 10–8. After the fight he asked to be included in the upcoming Featherweight tournament.

=== Title fights ===
Riding a five fight winning streak, Matsune was included in Shooto's Featherweight Survivor Tournament. He was scheduled to face Kimihito Nonaka in the semi-final bout of the tournament. Matsune opened the first round with a takedown, landing ground-and-pound from half guard, while Nonaka attempted to sweep. The second and third round followed the same dynamic, with Nonaka being given a point deduction in the second round due to an illegal upkick. Murata was scheduled to fight a rematch with Kentaro Imaizumi in the tournament final. Matsune won the fight by a majority decision to clinch his first professional title.

Following his tournament win, Matsune was given a title shot against the reigning champion Masahiro Oishi. Matsune won the fight through a majority decision.

Matsune returned to Shooto after a ten month absence to face Daniel Lima, considered a rising prospect at the time, in a non title fight match. At the beginning of the first round Matsune took Lima down and landed ground and pound from the top position, while Lima attempted several unsuccessful triangles and armbars. The first portion of the second round was spent in striking exchanges, but Matsune once again landed in the top position on the ground, after reversing Lima's throw attempt. The third round was similar to the first, with Matsune landing ground and pound from half guard.

For his first title defense Ryota was scheduled to fight a rematch with Kentaro Imaizumi. In the first round of the bout, Matsune let Imaizumi control the center of the ring, countering with hooks to Imaizumi's jab. Managing to stagger him with one of the counter hooks, Matsune pressured with several flurries, but failed to finish his opponent. Adjusting his approach in the second round, Kentaro allowed Matsune to advance and countered him with a mixture of kicks and reactive takedowns. Abandoning this approach in the final round, possibly for fear of a 10–8 first round, Imaizumi once again pressured Matsune. The fight in the final round was kept standing, with both fighters having success with their striking. The fight ended in a split decision, with two of the three judges awarding Matsune the decision victory (30–29, 29–30 and 30–28). Due to both athletes fighting conservatively, the fight itself was quite slow and low in volume, and was voted Worst Fight of the Year by Kansenki.net.

=== Post-title reign ===
Following his first and only title defense, Matsune suffered a knee injury, which prevented him from defending in the mandated time. Matsune was stripped of the title, but would return after 23 months to face the 2005 Shooto Newcomer of the Year Takeya Mizugaki. Mizugaki had the upper hand in the striking exchanges, while Matsune was successful with several takedown attempts. The fight ended in a draw.

After a four year absence from the sport, Murata returned to Shooto to face the former Shooto Lightweight champion Rumina Sato. Sato landed an intercepting knee in the second round, as Matsune shot for a takedown, and followed with several strikes before the referee stopped the fight.

Matsune's last professional fight was in 2015, during the VTJ Okinawa event, when he fought the former CFFC flyweight champion Kana Hyatt. Hyatt opened the round with a takedown, but was caught in a guillotine attempt from Matsune. After Hyatt defended this submission attempt, Matsune transitioned to an armbar, forcing his opponent to tap.

== Championships and accomplishments ==
=== Amateur titles ===
- Shooto
  - 7th All Japan Amateur Shooto Tournament Winner

=== Professional titles ===
- Shooto
  - Shooto Featherweight Survivor Tournament Winner
  - Shooto Featherweight (132.3 lbs) title
    - One successful title defense
- Fight Matrix
  - Fight Matrix Lineal Bantamweight Championship

== Mixed martial arts record ==
Professional record breakdown
| 19 matches | 16 wins | 2 losses |
| By knockout | 1 | 1 |
| By submission | 3 | 0 |
| By decision | 12 | 1 |
| Draws | 1 | |

| Res. | Record | Opponent | Method | Event | Date | Round | Time | Location | Notes |
|---|---|---|---|---|---|---|---|---|---|
| Win | 16–2–1 | Kana Hyatt | Submission (Armbar) | Vale Tudo Japan – VTJ in Okinawa | 3 October 2015 | 1 | 3:31 | Okinawa, Japan | Flyweight debut. |
| Loss | 15–2–1 | Rumina Sato | TKO (Knee and Punches) | Shooto: The Way of Shooto 3: Like a Tiger, Like a Dragon | 30 May 2010 | 2 | 0:21 | Tokyo, Japan | |
| Win | 15–1–1 | David Lejenas | Submission (Rear-Naked Choke) | Shooto: Champion Carnival | 14 October 2006 | 1 | 0:49 | Yokohama, Japan | |
| Draw | 14–1–1 | Takeya Mizugaki | Draw (Decision) | Shooto 2006: 7/21 in Korakuen Hall | 21 July 2006 | 3 | 5:00 | Tokyo, Japan | |
| Win | 14–1 | Kentaro Imaizumi | Decision (Split) | Shooto: Wanna Shooto 2004 | 12 November 2004 | 3 | 5:00 | Tokyo, Japan | Defends the Shooto Featherweight title. Later stripped due to inactivity. |
| Win | 13–1 | Daniel Lima | Decision (Unanimous) | Shooto: Shooto Junkie Is Back! | 27 June 2004 | 3 | 5:00 | Chiba, Japan | |
| Win | 12–1 | Masahiro Oishi | Decision (Majority) | Shooto: 8/10 in Yokohama Cultural Gymnasium | 10 August 2003 | 3 | 5:00 | Yokohama, Japan | Wins the Shooto Featherweight title. |
| Win | 11–1 | Kentaro Imaizumi | Decision (Majority) | Shooto: 5/4 in Korakuen Hall | 4 May 2003 | 3 | 5:00 | Tokyo, Japan | Shooto Featherweight Survivor Tournament Final. |
| Win | 10–1 | Kimihito Nonaka | Decision (Majority) | Shooto: 2/23 in Korakuen Hall | 23 February 2003 | 3 | 5:00 | Tokyo, Japan | Shooto Featherweight Survivor Tournament Semi-final. |
| Win | 9–1 | Itchaku Murata | Decision (Unanimous) | Shooto: Gig East 11 | 25 September 2002 | 3 | 5:00 | Tokyo, Japan | |
| Win | 8–1 | Lincoln Tyler | TKO (Corner Stoppage) | SB 23 – SuperBrawl 23 | 9 March 2002 | 1 | 5:00 | Honolulu, United States | Featherweight bout. |
| Win | 7–1 | Daiji Takahashi | Decision (Unanimous) | Shooto: Treasure Hunt 1 | 12 January 2002 | 2 | 5:00 | Tokyo, Japan | |
| Win | 6–1 | Daiji Takahashi | Decision (Majority) | Shooto: Gig East 6 | 23 October 2001 | 2 | 5:00 | Tokyo, Japan | |
| Win | 5–1 | Hiroshi Umemura | Decision (Unanimous) | Shooto: Gig East 5 | 15 August 2001 | 2 | 5:00 | Tokyo, Japan | Return to Bantamweight. |
| Loss | 4–1 | Kentaro Imaizumi | Decision (Unanimous) | Shooto: Gig East 3 | 14 June 2001 | 2 | 5:00 | Tokyo, Japan | Featherweight debut. |
| Win | 4–0 | Hiroyasu Kodera | Decision (Unanimous) | Shooto: Gig East 1 | 28 April 2001 | 2 | 5:00 | Tokyo, Japan | |
| Win | 3–0 | Tomoharu Umezawa | Submission (Toe Hold) | Shooto: To The Top 3 | 21 March 2001 | 2 | 2:41 | Tokyo, Japan | |
| Win | 2–0 | Nobuyuki Kato | Decision (Unanimous) | Shooto: To The Top 1 | 19 January 2001 | 2 | 5:00 | Tokyo, Japan | |
| Win | 1–0 | Katsuhisa Akasaki | Decision (Unanimous) | Shooto: R.E.A.D. 11 | 9 October 2000 | 2 | 5:00 | Tokyo, Japan | |

== Amateur mixed martial arts record ==
| Amateur record breakdown | | |
| 4 matches | 4 wins | 0 losses |
| By submission | 1 | 0 |
| By decision | 3 | 0 |

| Res. | Record | Opponent | Method | Event | Date | Round | Time | Location | Notes |
|---|---|---|---|---|---|---|---|---|---|
| Win | 4–0 | Shinobu Kato | Decision (Unanimous) | All Japan Amateur Shooto Tournament | 10 September 2000 | 2 | 3:00 | Tokyo, Japan | All Japan Amateur Shooto Tournament Final. |
| Win | 3–0 | Tomoji Umezawa | Submission (Heel hook) | All Japan Amateur Shooto Tournament | 10 September 2000 | 1 | 2:11 | Tokyo, Japan | All Japan Amateur Shooto Tournament Semi-Final. |
| Win | 2–0 | Naoki Tanimoto | Decision (Unanimous) | All Japan Amateur Shooto Tournament | 10 September 2000 | 1 | 4:00 | Tokyo, Japan | All Japan Amateur Shooto Tournament Quarter-Final. |
| Win | 1–0 | Yasushi Ando | Decision (Unanimous) | All Japan Amateur Shooto Tournament | 10 September 2000 | 1 | 4:00 | Tokyo, Japan | All Japan Amateur Shooto Tournament 1st round. |

== See also ==
- List of male mixed martial artists
