= Koichi Tanaka (fighter) =

Japanese mixed martial artist

- Born: October 20, 1971 (age 54); Japan
- Other names: Super Red Slayer Guy
- Nationality: Japanese
- Height: 5 ft 7 in (1.70 m)
- Weight: 145 lb (66 kg; 10.4 st)
- Division: Welterweight; Lightweight; Featherweight; Bantamweight
- Team: Red Sword Gym
- Years active: 1997 - 2012

Mixed martial arts record
- Total: 15
- Wins: 3
- By submission: 3
- Losses: 11
- By submission: 5
- By decision: 6
- Draws: 1

Other information
- Mixed martial arts record from Sherdog

Koichi Tanaka (born October 20, 1971) is a Japanese mixed martial artist. He competed in the Featherweight division.

== Mixed martial arts record ==
Professional record breakdown
15 matches	3 wins	11 losses
By submission	3	5
By decision	0	6
Draws	1	

Res.	Record	Opponent	Method	Event	Date	Round	Time	Location	Notes
Win	3–11–1	Manabu Kano	Submission (rear-naked choke)	Deep: Osaka Impact	May 26, 2012	2	1:50	Osaka, Japan	
Loss	2–11–1	Yuichi Miyagi	Decision (unanimous)	Pancrase: Rising 1	February 4, 2007	2	5:00	Osaka, Japan	
Loss	2–10–1	Kenji Takeshige	Submission (toe hold)	Pancrase: Blow 8	October 1, 2006	2	2:38	Osaka, Japan	Lightweight bout.
Loss	2–9–1	Hiroshi Komatsu	Decision (unanimous)	Shooto: Gig West 2	September 23, 2001	2	5:00	Osaka, Japan	Bantamweight bout.
Loss	2–8–1	Akitoshi Tamura	Decision (unanimous)	Shooto: Gig East 5	August 15, 2001	2	5:00	Tokyo, Japan	
Loss	2–7–1	Makoto Ishikawa	Decision (unanimous)	Shooto: Gig East 3	June 14, 2001	2	5:00	Tokyo, Japan	Return to Featherweight.
Loss	2–6–1	Yoshihiro Fujita	Technical Submission (armbar)	Shooto: Gig West 1	February 18, 2001	1	3:58	Osaka, Japan	Bantamweight debut.
Loss	2–5–1	Chikara Miyake	Submission (rear-naked choke)	Shooto: Renaxis 5	October 29, 1999	1	2:16	Kadoma, Osaka, Japan	
Loss	2–4–1	Yohei Nanbu	Decision (majority)	Shooto: Renaxis 3	August 4, 1999	2	5:00	Setagaya, Tokyo, Japan	Return to Featherweight.
Loss	2–3–1	Isao Tanimura	Decision (majority)	Shooto: Shooter's Passion	May 27, 1999	2	5:00	Setagaya, Tokyo, Japan	Welterweight debut.
Win	2–2–1	Patrick Madayag	Submission (rear-naked choke)	SB 10: SuperBrawl 10	November 20, 1998	1	10:34	Guam	
Loss	1–2–1	Jutaro Nakao	Submission (triangle choke)	Shooto: Shooter's Dream	September 18, 1998	1	3:56	Setagaya, Tokyo, Japan	Return to Lightweight.
Draw	1–1–1	Masato Fujiwara	Draw	Shooto: Las Grandes Viajes 3	May 13, 1998	2	5:00	Tokyo, Japan	Featherweight debut.
Loss	1–1	Tetsuji Kato	Technical Submission (armbar)	Shooto: Las Grandes Viajes 1	January 17, 1998	1	1:01	Tokyo, Japan	
Win	1–0	Tae Yoon Han	Submission (rear-naked choke)	CMA: Octagon Challenge	December 8, 1997	1	0:38	Nagoya, Aichi, Japan	

== See also ==
- List of male mixed martial artists
