= Katsuhisa Akasaki =

Japanese mixed martial artist

- Born: March 3, 1974 (age 52); Japan
- Nationality: Japanese
- Height: 5 ft 4 in (1.63 m)
- Weight: 143 lb (65 kg; 10.2 st)
- Division: Featherweight
- Team: Akasaki Dojo
- Years active: 1996 - 2013

Mixed martial arts record
- Total: 27
- Wins: 6
- By submission: 4
- By decision: 2
- Losses: 20
- By knockout: 3
- By submission: 6
- By decision: 9
- By disqualification: 2
- Draws: 1

Other information
- Mixed martial arts record from Sherdog

Katsuhisa Akasaki (Japanese: 赤崎勝久) (born March 3, 1974) is a Japanese mixed martial artist. He competed in the Featherweight division.

== Mixed martial arts record ==
Professional record breakdown
27 matches	6 wins	20 losses
By knockout	0	3
By submission	4	6
By decision	2	9
Unknown	0	2
Draws	1	

Res.	Record	Opponent	Method	Event	Date	Round	Time	Location	Notes
Loss	6-20-1	Yuji Sato	Decision (split)	Gladiator: Gladiator 59	August 25, 2013	2	5:00	Fukuoka, Japan	
Win	6-19-1	Young-Jun Kim	Decision (unanimous)	KAMA: Korean All-MMA Association vs. Gladiator 2012	September 15, 2012	2	3:00	Seoul, South Korea	
Win	5-19-1	Tatsumi Ashikari	Submission (armbar)	Gladiator: Gladiator 39	July 22, 2012	2	3:11	Fukuoka, Japan	
Win	4-19-1	Masayuki Sato	Submission (heel hook)	Gladiator: Gladiator 30	March 11, 2012	1	0:30	Fukuoka, Japan	
Loss	3-19-1	Seong-Jae Kim	TKO (punches)	Gladiator: Gladiator 26	November 6, 2011	2	0:00	Fukuoka, Japan	
Win	3-18-1	Suguru Kawabata	Submission (heel hook)	Gladiator: Gladiator 18	May 22, 2011	2	1:02	Fukuoka, Japan	
Loss	2-18-1	Minoru Takeuchi	Submission (guillotine choke)	Shooto: Genesis	March 21, 2011	1	1:40	Kitakyushu, Fukuoka, Japan	
Loss	2-17-1	Nobuhiro Hayakawa	Submission (rear-naked choke)	Shooto: Trilogy 1	February 21, 2010	1	2:51	Hakata-ku, Fukuoka, Japan	
Loss	2-16-1	Yasuo Niki	TKO (punches)	Shooto: Grapplingman 8	May 17, 2009	2	2:23	Hiroshima, Japan	
Loss	2-15-1	Tsuyoshi Okada	Decision (unanimous)	Shooto: Grapplingman 7	May 18, 2008	2	5:00	Hiroshima, Japan	
Loss	2-14-1	Hiroharu Matsufuji	Submission (kimura)	Shooto: 3/21 in Kitazawa Town Hall	March 21, 2008	2	3:04	Setagaya, Tokyo, Japan	
Loss	2-13-1	Takeshi Sato	Decision (majority)	Shooto 2007: 6/30 in Kitazawa Town Hall	June 30, 2007	2	5:00	Setagaya, Tokyo, Japan	
Win	2-12-1	Kenji Hosoya	Decision (unanimous)	Shooto: 11/30 in Kitazawa Town Hall	November 30, 2006	2	5:00	Setagaya, Tokyo, Japan	
Loss	1-12-1	Homare Kuboyama	Decision (unanimous)	Shooto: 4/23 in Hakata Star Lanes	April 23, 2005	2	5:00	Tokyo, Japan	
Loss	1-11-1	Keisuke Kurata	TKO (cut)	Shooto: Gig Central 3	March 30, 2003	1	2:35	Nagoya, Aichi, Japan	
Win	1-10-1	Nat McIntyre	Submission (heel hook)	Shooto: 2/6 in Kitazawa Town Hall	February 6, 2003	2	3:34	Setagaya, Tokyo, Japan	
Loss	0-10-1	Shinichi Hanawa	DQ (knee to the head on the ground)	Shooto: Wanna Shooto Japan	April 21, 2002	1	4:00	Setagaya, Tokyo, Japan	
Loss	0-9-1	Masatoshi Abe	Decision (unanimous)	Shooto: Treasure Hunt 2	January 25, 2002	2	5:00	Setagaya, Tokyo, Japan	
Loss	0-8-1	Yasuhiro Urushitani	Decision (majority)	Shooto: To The Top 9	September 27, 2001	2	5:00	Tokyo, Japan	
Loss	0-7-1	Seiji Ozuka	Decision (split)	Shooto: To The Top 5	June 30, 2001	2	5:00	Setagaya, Tokyo, Japan	
Loss	0-6-1	Yoshihiro Fujita	Submission (kimura)	Shooto: Gig East 1	April 28, 2001	1	5:00	Tokyo, Japan	
Loss	0-5-1	Toshiteru Ishii	DQ (kneeing to the head on the ground)	Shooto: To The Top 3	March 21, 2001	2	2:46	Setagaya, Tokyo, Japan	
Loss	0-4-1	Ryota Matsune	Decision (unanimous)	Shooto: R.E.A.D. 11	October 9, 2000	2	5:00	Setagaya, Tokyo, Japan	
Draw	0-3-1	Takeshi Takamatsu	Draw	Daidojuku: WARS 5	April 8, 1999	3	3:00	Japan	
Loss	0-3	Yoshiyuki Takayama	Submission (rear naked choke)	Shooto: Gig '98 1st	April 10, 1998	1	3:34	Tokyo, Japan	
Loss	0-2	Masahiro Oishi	Submission (armbar)	Shooto: Let's Get Lost	October 4, 1996	1	2:12	Tokyo, Japan	
Loss	0-1	Hisao Ikeda	Decision (majority)	Shooto: Free Fight Kawasaki	July 28, 1996	3	3:00	Kawasaki, Kanagawa, Japan	

== See also ==
- List of male mixed martial artists
