= Hiroshi Tsuruya =

Japanese mixed martial artist

- Born: December 8, 1970 (age 55); Japan
- Nationality: Japanese
- Weight: 154 lb (70 kg; 11.0 st)
- Division: Lightweight; Welterweight
- Style: Kickboxing, Wrestling, Judo, BJJ
- Team: Paraestra Matsudo
- Rank: Black belt in Brazilian jiu-jitsu
- Years active: 1998 - 2008

Mixed martial arts record
- Total: 12
- Wins: 7
- By submission: 4
- By decision: 3
- Losses: 2
- By decision: 2
- Draws: 3

Other information
- Mixed martial arts record from Sherdog

Hiroshi Tsuruya (born December 8, 1970) is a Japanese mixed martial artist. He competed in the Lightweight and Welterweight divisions.

== Mixed martial arts record ==
Professional record breakdown
12 matches	7 wins	2 losses
By submission	4	0
By decision	3	2
Draws	3	

Res.	Record	Opponent	Method	Event	Date	Round	Time	Location	Notes
Win	7–2–3	Tomohiko Yoshida	Submission (lapel choke)	Zst: Swat! in Face 1	August 24, 2008	2	2:22	Tokyo, Japan	
Loss	6–2–3	Vítor Ribeiro	Decision (unanimous)	Shooto: Treasure Hunt 10	September 16, 2002	3	5:00	Yokohama, Kanagawa, Japan	
Win	6–1–3	Andy Wang	Decision (unanimous)	SB 23: SuperBrawl 23	March 9, 2002	3	5:00	Honolulu, Hawaii, United States	
Win	5–1–3	Koji Takeuchi	Decision (unanimous)	Shooto: To The Top 9	September 27, 2001	2	5:00	Tokyo, Japan	
Win	4–1–3	Shigetoshi Iwase	Decision (unanimous)	Shooto: Gig East 3	June 14, 2001	2	5:00	Tokyo, Japan	
Draw	3–1–3	Kim Mason	Draw	Shooto: Wanna Shooto 2001	April 8, 2001	2	5:00	Setagaya, Tokyo, Japan	
Draw	3–1–2	Seichi Ikemoto	Draw	Shooto: R.E.A.D. 9	August 27, 2000	2	5:00	Yokohama, Kanagawa, Japan	
Win	3–1–1	Tomonori Ohara	Submission (kimura)	Shooto: R.E.A.D. 6	July 16, 2000	1	0:50	Tokyo, Japan	
Win	2–1–1	Masakazu Kuramochi	Submission (armbar)	Shooto: R.E.A.D. 1	January 14, 2000	1	1:51	Tokyo, Japan	
Win	1–1–1	Tatsuharu Doi	Submission (armlock)	Daidojuku: WARS 5	April 8, 1999	1	1:18	Japan	
Loss	0–1–1	Takanori Gomi	Decision (unanimous)	Shooto: Las Grandes Viajes 6	November 27, 1998	2	5:00	Tokyo, Japan	
Draw	0–0–1	Takaharu Murahama	Draw	Shooto: Gig '98 2nd	July 18, 1998	2	5:00	Tokyo, Japan	

== See also ==
- List of male mixed martial artists
