= Martijn de Jong =

Dutch mixed martial arts fighter

- Born: July 17, 1974 (age 52); Deventer, Netherlands
- Other names: The Specialist
- Nationality: Dutch
- Height: 6 ft 0 in (1.83 m)
- Weight: 183 lb (83 kg; 13.1 st)
- Division: Middleweight; Welterweight
- Style: Kyokushin, Jujutsu, Judo, Wrestling, Kickboxing, BJJ
- Stance: Orthodox
- Fighting out of: Holland
- Team: Golden Glory; Tatsujin MMA
- Years active: 1997 - 2003

Mixed martial arts record
- Total: 18
- Wins: 8
- By knockout: 1
- By submission: 5
- Unknown: 2
- Losses: 7
- By knockout: 2
- By submission: 3
- By decision: 2
- Draws: 3

Other information
- Mixed martial arts record from Sherdog

Martijn de Jong (born July 17, 1974) is a Dutch mixed martial artist.

He founded Tatsujin MMA in 1995. After becoming a black belt in Traditional Jiu Jitsu when he was seventeen, he started to master other Martial Arts such as Kyokushin Karate (black belt), Brazilian jiu-jitsu (black belt), Shooto, Dutch Kickboxing, Judo, Wrestling and Submission Fighting.

Because of his technical approach in Mixed Martial Arts during his active fighting career, he was given the nickname ‘The Specialist’ by his manager. When he started his own Team, he called it "Tatsujin Dojo" which means “The Gym of The Specialist” in Japanese.

He started Jiu Jitsu in 1987 at the age of 13. He became a black belt at the age of 17 and started to add Kyokushinkai Karate to become a black belt just 4 years later.

On his quest to become a complete fighter he started with Brazilian jiu-jitsu at Remco Pardoel's gym in early 1995. Later that year, he started teaching BJJ and MMA together with his long time training partner Saron Debets. Approximately 1 year later, World Champion Thaiboxing and Vale Tudo fighter Jan Lomulder joined the classes and he started teaching him MMA while Jan taught him Thaiboxing.

Around the same time multiple times Dutch Champion Greco Roman Wrestling, Andy Jekel joined the team. While he became skilled in MMA, he taught Martijn all the details of Wrestling.

In 1996, he fought his first MMA competitions in Holland. In 1997, after three wins, he was invited with a whole team of Dutch fighters to compete in Tokyo against a Japanese Team fight in "Japan Extreme Challenge Vale Tudo Open”. He won that fight against Taro Obata by arm bar in the first round.

After he fought in Shooto Japan in 1999, The head promoter Mr. Sakamoto together with the president of the International Shooto Commission Mr Suzuki, asked Martijn to be the first representative of Shooto in Europe. He started to spread Shooto throughout Europe where up till date over 100 Shooto events are organized.

In 2000 Martijn fought Brazilian sensation "Jose Pele Landi-Jons". He lost that fight but it put him on the radar of Team Golden Glory, who asked him to join the team which was about to start. It was the first professional management team in Europe consisting of the following fighters: Semmy Schilt, Gilbert Yvel, Alistair Overeem, Valentijn Overeem, Heath Herring and Martijn de Jong. As a trainer of Golden Glory, he produced multiple World Champions like Alistair Overeem, Marloes Coenen and Siyar Bahadurzada.

In 2004 Marko Leisten (ADCC World Federation President), asked him to be the president of ADCC Holland. Annual events have been organized ever since.

Organizing Shooto events for some years, He wanted to bring the sport to another level and with the help of Team Golden Glory they founded "GLORY" (then called "Ultimate Glory") in 2006. It was a combination of Shooto / MMA fights with Kickboxing matches.

Bert van der Ryd joined the team in 2008 and together they organized "A Decade of Fights" in 2009, celebrated Golden Glory's 10 years’ anniversary. A group of financial investors saw potential in GLORY and Golden Glory and bought them in 2012.

After the sale Martijn stayed two more years with GLORY as a consultant before he moved on and pursued his passion MMA again.

In 2014, he started to look for opportunities in the country where his father was born: Indonesia. He found out that there was a high demand of quality MMA training in Indonesia, however the facilities were not yet in place. In 2015, he made a deal with, the founder of Celebrity Fitness JJ Sweeney, which resulted in educating all the Personal Trainers of Celebrity Fitness in Indonesia, Malaysia and Singapore with the Tatsujin Training System. Up to date, close to 1,000 Personal Trainers have been educated in the Tatsujin Training System Mixed Martial Arts, Kickboxing and/or Self-Defense.

On July 17, 2017 the first official Tatsujin MMA Gym was opened in the South of Jakarta, Indonesia. The plan is to open many more in the future.

== Mixed martial arts record ==
Professional record breakdown
| 18 matches | 8 wins | 7 losses |
| By knockout | 1 | 2 |
| By submission | 5 | 3 |
| By decision | 0 | 2 |
| Unknown | 2 | 0 |
| Draws | 3 | |

| Res. | Record | Opponent | Method | Event | Date | Round | Time | Location | Notes |
|---|---|---|---|---|---|---|---|---|---|
| Draw | 8–7–3 | Shiko Yamashita | Draw | Shooto: 5/4 in Korakuen Hall | May 4, 2003 | 3 | 5:00 | Tokyo, Japan | |
| Loss | 8–7–2 | Egan Inoue | KO (kick) | SB 25: SuperBrawl 25 | July 13, 2002 | 1 | 2:46 | Honolulu, Hawaii, United States | |
| Win | 8–6–2 | Dave Dalgliesh | Submission (triangle choke) | 2H2H 4: Simply the Best 4 | March 17, 2002 | 0 | N/A | Rotterdam, South Holland, Netherlands | |
| Draw | 7–6–2 | Izuru Takeuchi | Draw | Shooto: To The Top 10 | November 25, 2001 | 3 | 5:00 | Tokyo, Japan | |
| Draw | 7–6–1 | Miikka Lahtinen | Draw | BOA 3: Battle of Arnhem 3 | September 23, 2001 | 0 | 0:00 | Arnhem, Gelderland, Netherlands | |
| Loss | 7–6 | Izuru Takeuchi | Decision (split) | Shooto: To The Top 6 | July 6, 2001 | 3 | 5:00 | Tokyo, Japan | |
| Loss | 7–5 | Andrei Semenov | TKO (strikes) | MillenniumSports: Veni Vidi Vici | April 22, 2001 | 0 | 0:00 | Veenendaal, Utrecht, Netherlands | |
| Win | 7–4 | Tulio Palhares | TKO (broken nose) | 2H2H 2: Simply The Best | March 18, 2001 | 1 | 6:00 | Rotterdam, South Holland, Netherlands | |
| Win | 6–4 | Yuki Sasaki | Submission (triangle choke) | Shooto: R.E.A.D. 12 | November 12, 2000 | 1 | 0:40 | Tokyo, Japan | |
| Loss | 5–4 | Andrei Semenov | Submission (guillotine choke) | BOA 2: Battle of Arnhem 2 | September 3, 2000 | 0 | 0:00 | Arnhem, Netherlands | |
| Loss | 5–3 | Jose Landi-Jons | Decision | 2H2H 1: 2 Hot 2 Handle | March 5, 2000 | 1 | 10:00 | Rotterdam, Netherlands | |
| Loss | 5–2 | Masanori Suda | Submission (punches) | Shooto: Renaxis 5 | October 29, 1999 | 2 | 4:44 | Kadoma, Osaka, Japan | Return to Middleweight. |
| Win | 5–1 | Richard Plug | Submission (ankle lock) | BOA 1: Battle of Arnhem 1 | September 5, 1999 | 0 | 0:00 | Arnhem, Netherlands | Welterweight debut. |
| Win | 4–1 | Leslie Nijman | N/A | FFH: Free Fight Gala | May 15, 1999 | 0 | 0:00 | Purmerend, North Holland, Netherlands | |
| Win | 3–1 | Harold van Rijst | Submission (armbar) | MillenniumSports: Fight Gala | March 14, 1999 | 0 | 0:00 | Veenendaal, Utrecht, Netherlands | |
| Win | 2–1 | Harold van Rijst | N/A | FFH: Free Fight Gala | December 21, 1997 | 0 | 0:00 | Beverwijk, North Holland, Netherlands | |
| Loss | 1–1 | Richard Plug | Submission (punches) | RDFF 2: Red Devil Free Fight 2 | December 7, 1997 | 0 | 0:00 | Amsterdam, North Holland, Netherlands | |
| Win | 1–0 | Taro Obata | Submission (armbar) | JECVTO: Japan Extreme Challenge Vale Tudo Open | May 28, 1997 | 1 | 2:27 | Tokyo, Japan | |

== See also ==
- List of male mixed martial artists
