= Isao Tanimura =

Japanese mixed martial artist

- Born: Japan
- Other names: The Babanba
- Nationality: Japanese
- Weight: 167 lb (76 kg; 11.9 st)
- Division: Welterweight; Lightweight
- Team: Paraestra Tokyo
- Years active: 1998 - 2002

Mixed martial arts record
- Total: 12
- Wins: 7
- By decision: 7
- Losses: 5
- By knockout: 1
- By submission: 1
- By decision: 3

Other information
- Mixed martial arts record from Sherdog

Isao Tanimura is a Japanese mixed martial artist. He competed in the Middleweight division.

== Mixed martial arts record ==
Professional record breakdown
12 matches	7 wins	5 losses
By knockout	0	1
By submission	0	1
By decision	7	3

Res.	Record	Opponent	Method	Event	Date	Round	Time	Location	Notes
Win	7–5	Mario Stapel	Decision (unanimous)	Shooto: Wanna Shooto 2002	April 14, 2002	2	5:00	Setagaya, Tokyo, Japan	
Win	6–5	Shigetoshi Iwase	Decision (majority)	Shooto: To The Top 9	September 27, 2001	2	5:00	Tokyo, Japan	
Loss	5–5	Takuya Wada	Decision (unanimous)	Shooto: To The Top 5	June 30, 2001	2	5:00	Setagaya, Tokyo, Japan	
Win	5–4	Rodney Ellis	Decision (majority)	Shooto: Wanna Shooto 2001	April 8, 2001	2	5:00	Setagaya, Tokyo, Japan	
Win	4–4	Yuji Kusu	Decision (unanimous)	Shooto: Gig West 1	February 18, 2001	2	5:00	Osaka, Japan	
Loss	3–4	Alex Cook	KO (punches)	Shooto: R.E.A.D. 5	May 22, 2000	1	1:27	Tokyo, Japan	Return to Welterweight.
Win	3–3	Takaharu Murahama	Decision (unanimous)	Shooto: R.E.A.D. 2	March 17, 2000	2	5:00	Tokyo, Japan	
Loss	2–3	Seichi Ikemoto	Decision (unanimous)	Shooto: Renaxis 5	October 29, 1999	2	5:00	Kadoma, Osaka, Japan	Return to Lightweight.
Win	2–2	Tomoaki Hayama	Decision (majority)	Shooto: Renaxis 2	July 16, 1999	2	5:00	Tokyo, Japan	
Win	1–2	Koichi Tanaka	Decision (majority)	Shooto: Shooter's Passion	May 27, 1999	2	5:00	Setagaya, Tokyo, Japan	
Loss	0–2	Hiroyuki Kojima	Technical Submission (kimura)	Shooto: Gig '98 2nd	July 18, 1998	1	4:37	Tokyo, Japan	Welterweight debut.
Loss	0–1	Saburo Kawakatsu	Decision (unanimous)	Shooto: Gig '98 1st	April 10, 1998	2	5:00	Tokyo, Japan	

== See also ==
- List of male mixed martial artists
