= Jutaro Nakao =

Japanese mixed martial artist

Jutaro Nakao 中尾受太郎
- Born: November 30, 1970 (age 55); Yokosuka, Kanagawa, Japan
- Other names: The King of Triangle
- Nationality: Japanese
- Height: 5 ft 9 in (175 cm)
- Weight: 167 lb (76 kg; 11 st 13 lb)
- Division: Middleweight; Welterweight; Lightweight
- Style: Shooto, Boxing, Judo
- Team: Freelance
- Rank: 3rd Dan Black Belt in Judo
- Years active: 1996-present

Mixed martial arts record
- Total: 50
- Wins: 26
- By knockout: 7
- By submission: 14
- By decision: 5
- Losses: 20
- By knockout: 3
- By submission: 1
- By decision: 16
- Draws: 4

Other information
- Mixed martial arts record from Sherdog

Jutaro Nakao Japanese: 中尾受太郎 (born November 30, 1970) is a Japanese mixed martial artist. He competes in both the Lightweight and Welterweight divisions.

A judo based fighter, Nakao is known for his chiseled physique and high defensive abilities on the ring, being difficult to finish off by his opponents. He is also famous for his prowess with the triangle choke, having received the nickname of "King of Triangle" by the Japanese press due to his multiple victories through said technique.

He is also one of the few fighters who have a legal win through the popularly called "rape choke" or two-handed stranglehold, after defeating Thomas Denny with it.

== Career accomplishments ==
=== Mixed martial arts ===
- Ultimate Fighting Championship
  - UFC Encyclopedia Awards
    - Knockout of the Night (One time) vs. Tony DeSouza

== Mixed martial arts record ==
Professional record breakdown
49 matches	26 wins	19 losses
By knockout	7	3
By submission	14	1
By decision	5	15
Draws	4	

Res.	Record	Opponent	Method	Event	Date	Round	Time	Location	Notes
Loss	26–20–4	Yoshitomo Watanabe	Decision (unanimous)	Deep - Cage Impact 2018 in Osaka	October 8, 2018	3	5:00	Osaka, Japan	
Win	26–19–4	Yuki Kondo	TKO (punches)	Pancrase / Deep - Pancrase vs. Deep: Osaka	December 24, 2017	2	0:57	Amagasaki, Japan	
Loss	25–19–4	Ryuichiro Sumimura	Decision (unanimous)	Deep - Cage Impact 2015 in Osaka	October 11, 2015	3	5:00	Osaka, Japan	
Win	25–18–4	Hidetora Hidetora	Decision (unanimous)	Deep - Cage Impact 2014 in Osaka	October 19, 2014	3	5:00	Osaka, Japan	Return to Welterweight.
Loss	24–18–4	Katsunori Kikuno	KO (punch)	Deep - Cage Impact 2013	June 15, 2013	1	1:07	Tokyo, Japan	
Win	24–17–4	Doo Jae Jeong	Submission (armbar)	Deep - Osaka Impact 2012	September 29, 2012	1	4:13	Osaka, Japan	
Loss	23–17–4	Yasuaki Kishimoto	Decision (unanimous)	Deep: Osaka Impact	September 4, 2011	3	5:00	Osaka, Japan	
Loss	23–16–4	Satoru Kitaoka	Decision (unanimous)	Deep: 53 Impact	April 22, 2011	3	5:00	Osaka, Japan	
Win	23–15–4	Yuki Ito	Decision (unanimous)	Deep: 45 Impact	January 24, 2010	3	5:00	Osaka, Japan	Return to Lightweight.
Loss	22–15–4	Ryo Chonan	Decision (unanimous)	Deep: 43 Impact	August 23, 2009	3	5:00	Tokyo, Japan	
Loss	22–14–4	Koichiro Matsumoto	Decision (unanimous)	Deep: 40 Impact	February 20, 2009	3	5:00	Tokyo, Japan	Lightweight bout.
Win	22–13–4	Yong Fun Lee	TKO (punches)	Deep: Gladiator	August 16, 2008	2	2:26	Tokyo, Japan	
Win	21–13–4	Shigetoshi Iwase	Decision (unanimous)	Deep: 35 Impact	May 19, 2008	2	5:00	Tokyo, Japan	
Loss	20–13–4	Tae Hyun Bang	TKO (punches)	Deep: 33 Impact	December 12, 2007	2	1:15	Tokyo, Japan	Catchweight (76 kg) bout.
Draw	20–12–4	Kiuma Kunioku	Draw	Deep: 30 Impact	July 8, 2007	3	5:00	Osaka, Japan	
Loss	20–12–3	Hidehiko Hasegawa	Decision (majority)	Deep: 28 Impact	February 16, 2007	3	5:00	Tokyo, Japan	Lost Deep Welterweight Title
Loss	20–11–3	Fabricio Monteiro	Decision (unanimous)	Deep: 26 Impact	October 10, 2006	3	5:00	Tokyo, Japan	
Win	20–10–3	Kousei Kubota	TKO (soccer kicks)	Deep: 25 Impact	August 4, 2006	2	2:08	Tokyo, Japan	
Win	19–10–3	Seichi Ikemoto	Decision (majority)	Real Rhythm - 3rd Stage	March 4, 2006	3	5:00	Osaka, Japan	Defended Deep Welterweight Title
Draw	18–10–3	Won Jin Eoh	Draw	Deep: 20th Impact	September 3, 2005	3	5:00	Tokyo, Japan	
Loss	18–10–2	Marcus Aurélio	Decision (unanimous)	Pride: Bushido 8	July 17, 2005	2	5:00	Nagoya, Japan	Lightweight bout.
Win	18–9–2	Kyosuke Sasaki	Decision (unanimous)	Real Rhythm - 1st Stage	March 6, 2005	3	5:00	Osaka, Japan	
Win	17–9–2	Daisuke Nakamura	TKO (punches)	Deep: 16th Impact	October 30, 2004	3	3:16	Tokyo, Japan	Won the Deep Welterweight Championship.
Win	16–9–2	Shinya Aoki	KO (punch)	Deep: 16th Impact	October 30, 2004	1	4:29	Tokyo, Japan	
Win	15–9–2	Kenji Arai	Submission (triangle choke)	Deep: 15th Impact	July 3, 2004	1	4:04	Tokyo, Japan	
Loss	14–9–2	Akira Kikuchi	Decision (majority)	Shooto 2004: 5/3 in Korakuen Hall	May 3, 2004	3	5:00	Tokyo, Japan	
Win	14–8–2	Sauli Heilimo	Submission (reverse triangle choke)	Shooto - 7/13 in Korakuen Hall	July 13, 2003	2	0:39	Tokyo, Japan	
Win	13–8–2	Deshaun Johnson	Submission (keylock)	SB 27 - SuperBrawl 27	November 9, 2002	1	4:53	Honolulu, Hawaii, United States	
Loss	12–8–2	Sean Sherk	Decision (unanimous)	UFC 36	March 22, 2002	3	5:00	Paradise, Nevada, United States	
Win	12–7–2	Takuya Wada	Submission (triangle choke)	Shooto - To The Top Final Act	December 16, 2001	1	4:07	Tokyo, Japan	
Win	11–7–2	Tony DeSouza	KO (punch)	UFC 33	September 28, 2001	2	0:15	Paradise, Nevada, United States	
Win	10–7–2	LaVerne Clark	Technical Submission (triangle choke)	HOOKnSHOOT - Masters	May 26, 2001	3	3:50	Evansville, Indiana, United States	
Win	9–7–2	Thomas Denny	Submission (front strangle choke)	Shooto - To The Top 2	March 2, 2001	3	3:09	Tokyo, Japan	
Draw	8–7–2	Steve Berger	Draw	HOOKnSHOOT - Fusion	November 18, 2000	3	5:00	Evansville, Indiana, United States	
Loss	8–7–1	Dan Gilbert	TKO (doctor)	Shooto - R.E.A.D. 8	August 4, 2000	3	4:02	Osaka, Japan	Lightweight bout.
Loss	8–6–1	Ray Cooper	Decision (unanimous)	Shooto - R.E.A.D. 1	January 14, 2000	3	5:00	Tokyo, Japan	
Win	8–5–1	Rafles la Rose	Submission (triangle choke)	Shooto - Renaxis 5	October 29, 1999	1	2:17	Osaka, Japan	Return to Welterweight.
Loss	7–5–1	Dave Menne	Decision (unanimous)	SB 13 - SuperBrawl 13	September 7, 1999	3	5:00	Honolulu, Hawaii, United States	Middleweight debut.
Loss	7–4–1	Tetsuji Kato	Decision (unanimous)	Shooto - 10th Anniversary Event	May 29, 1999	3	5:00	Yokohama, Japan	
Win	7–3–1	Pat Miletich	Technical Submission (triangle choke)	SB 11 - SuperBrawl 11	February 2, 1999	1	9:22	Honolulu, Hawaii, United States	
Win	6–3–1	Koichi Tanaka	Submission (triangle choke)	Shooto - Shooter's Dream	September 18, 1998	1	3:56	Tokyo, Japan	
Loss	5–3–1	Hayato Sakurai	Decision (unanimous)	Shooto - Las Grandes Viajes 3	May 13, 1998	3	5:00	Tokyo, Japan	Welterweight bout.
Win	5–2–1	Jay R. Palmer	Submission (rear naked choke)	Shooto - Las Grandes Viajes 1	January 17, 1998	1	3:51	Tokyo, Japan	Lightweight debut.
Win	4–2–1	Steve Nelson	Submission (triangle choke)	VTJ 1997 - Vale Tudo Japan 1997	November 29, 1997	2	5:31	Tokyo, Japan	
Win	3–2–1	Tetsuji Kato	Submission (armbar)	Shooto - Reconquista 3	August 27, 1997	3	4:56	Tokyo, Japan	
Draw	2–2–1	Akihiro Gono	Draw	Shooto - Gig	June 25, 1997	3	5:00	Tokyo, Japan	
Loss	2–2	Susumu Yamasaki	Decision (majority)	Daidojuku - WARS 4	March 11, 1997	3	3:00	Tokyo, Japan	
Loss	2–1	Alex Cook	Submission (rear naked choke)	Shooto - Let's Get Lost	October 4, 1996	2	1:50	Tokyo, Japan	
Win	2–0	Naoto Kojima	Submission (rear naked choke)	Shooto - Vale Tudo Junction 2	March 5, 1996	2	1:42	Tokyo, Japan	
Win	1–0	Yasunori Okuda	TKO (punches)	Shooto - Vale Tudo Junction 1	January 20, 1996	1	1:18	Tokyo, Japan	

== Kickboxing record ==
Kickboxing record
0 wins (0 KOs), 1 loss
Date	Result	Opponent	Event	Location	Method	Round	Time	Record
February 2, 2003	Win	(Japan) Takuya Watanabe	Shootboxing "S" of the World	Tokyo, Japan	Decision (unanimous)	3	3:00	1-0
Legend: Win Loss Draw/No contest
