= Naoki Matsushita (mixed martial artist) =

Japanese mixed martial arts fighter

Naoki Matsushita 松下直樹
- Born: March 31, 1976 (age 50); Japan
- Nationality: Japanese
- Height: 5 ft 6 in (1.68 m)
- Weight: 154 lb (70 kg; 11.0 st)
- Division: Lightweight
- Team: MB3Z
- Years active: 2001 - 2012

Mixed martial arts record
- Total: 39
- Wins: 12
- By knockout: 5
- By decision: 7
- Losses: 16
- By knockout: 10
- By decision: 6
- Draws: 11

Other information
- Mixed martial arts record from Sherdog

Naoki Matsushita Japanese: 松下直樹 (born March 31, 1976) is a Japanese mixed martial artist. He competed in the Lightweight division.

== Mixed martial arts record ==
Professional record breakdown
39 matches	12 wins	16 losses
By knockout	5	10
By decision	7	6
Draws	11	

Res.	Record	Opponent	Method	Event	Date	Round	Time	Location	Notes
Loss	12-16-11	Yusuke Tsunoda	KO (Punch)	Deep: Nagoya Impact 2012: Kobudo Fight	July 22, 2012	1	2:06	Nagoya, Japan	
Draw	12-15-11	Yutaka Ueda	Draw	Deep: Cage Impact 2011 in Nagoya	July 10, 2011	2	5:00	Nagoya, Japan	
Loss	12-15-10	Sadao Kondo	KO (Punches)	Deep: clubDeep Nagoya: Kobudo Fight 2	February 13, 2011	2	1:21	Nagoya, Japan	
Draw	12-14-10	Koji Nakamura	Draw	Deep: clubDeep Nagoya: Kobudo Fight	September 5, 2010	2	5:00	Nagoya, Japan	
Win	12-14-9	Yuya Osugi	TKO (Punches)	Deep: Cage Impact in Nagoya	July 11, 2010	1	2:58	Nagoya, Japan	
Loss	11-14-9	Seichi Ikemoto	Decision (Majority)	Deep: Cage Impact 2010 in Osaka	June 6, 2010	3	5:00	Osaka, Japan	
Loss	11-13-9	Yuki Ito	TKO (Punches)	Deep: Cage Impact 2009	December 19, 2009	1	3:05	Tokyo, Japan	
Win	11-12-9	Luiz Andrade I	KO (Punch)	Deep: Hamamatsu Impact	September 27, 2009	2	4:20	Hamamatsu, Japan	
Win	10-12-9	Jang Yong Kim	TKO (Punches)	FMC 1: Korea vs. Japan	August 16, 2009	1	2:10	Seoul, South Korea	
Loss	9-12-9	Yasuaki Kishimoto	Decision (Majority)	Deep: Nagoya Impact	July 26, 2009	2	5:00	Nagoya, Japan	
Loss	9-11-9	Won Sik Park	TKO (Doctor Stoppage)	Deep: 41 Impact	April 16, 2009	1	3:59	Tokyo, Japan	
Loss	9-10-9	Ryan Bow	Decision (Unanimous)	Deep: clubDeep Nagoya: MB3z Impact, All Stand Up	June 29, 2008	3	5:00	Nagoya, Japan	
Draw	9-9-9	Ryan Bow	Draw	Deep: clubDeep Tokyo	March 29, 2008	2	5:00	Tokyo, Japan	
Loss	9-9-8	Yukinari Tamura	TKO (Doctor Stoppage)	Deep: Protect Impact 2007	December 22, 2007	2	3:46	Osaka, Japan	
Loss	9-8-8	Tae Hyun Bang	Decision (Unanimous)	Deep: CMA Festival 2	July 23, 2007	2	5:00	Tokyo, Japan	
Win	9-7-8	Edison Salman Mishio	Decision (Unanimous)	Deep: clubDeep Nagoya: MB3z Impact, Power of a Dream	June 10, 2007	2	5:00	Nagoya, Japan	
Loss	8-7-8	Michihiro Omigawa	TKO (Punches)	Deep: 29 Impact	April 13, 2007	2	1:17	Tokyo, Japan	
Draw	8-6-8	Hiroyuki Abe	Draw	Pride Bushido 12	August 26, 2006	2	5:00	Nagoya, Japan	
Loss	8-6-7	Seichi Ikemoto	TKO (Doctor Stoppage)	Real Rhythm: 4th Stage	July 30, 2006	1	2:26	Osaka, Japan	
Win	8-5-7	Hiroki Nagaoka	TKO (Punches)	Deep: clubDeep Nagoya: MB3z Impact, Di Entrare	May 21, 2006	2	0:19	Nagoya, Japan	
Loss	7-5-7	Jin Kazeta	TKO (Punches)	Shooto: Gig Central 9	February 26, 2006	1	4:54	Nagoya, Aichi, Japan	
Win	7-4-7	Takahito Iida	KO (Punch)	GCM: D.O.G. 4	December 11, 2005	2	3:28	Tokyo, Japan	
Win	6-4-7	Yuichi Ikari	Decision (Unanimous)	Deep: clubDeep Toyama: Barbarian Festival 3	October 30, 2005	2	5:00	Toyama, Japan	
Loss	5-4-7	Yoshihiro Tomioka	TKO (Punches)	Deep: 19th Impact	July 8, 2005	2	0:33	Tokyo, Japan	
Win	5-3-7	Ken Omatsu	Decision (Unanimous)	Shooto: Gig Central 7	March 27, 2005	2	5:00	Nagoya, Aichi, Japan	
Draw	4-3-7	Tomoyuki Fukami	Draw	Deep: clubDeep Osaka	November 28, 2004	2	5:00	Osaka, Japan	
Draw	4-3-6	Tashiro Nishiuchi	Draw	Deep: clubDeep Toyama: Barbarian Festival 1	October 24, 2004	2	5:00	Toyama, Japan	
Draw	4-3-5	Takahito Iida	Draw	GCM: Demolition 040919	September 19, 2004	2	5:00	Tokyo, Japan	
Loss	4-3-4	Ganjo Tentsuku	Decision (Majority)	Shooto: Gig Central 5	March 28, 2004	2	5:00	Nagoya, Aichi, Japan	
Loss	4-2-4	Kotetsu Boku	TKO (Punches)	Shooto: Gig Central 4	September 21, 2003	2	1:15	Nagoya, Aichi, Japan	
Draw	4-1-4	Mitsuhiro Ishida	Draw	Shooto: 7/13 in Korakuen Hall	July 13, 2003	2	5:00	Tokyo, Japan	
Win	4-1-3	Masato Fujiwara	Decision (Unanimous)	Shooto: Gig Central 3	March 30, 2003	2	5:00	Nagoya, Aichi, Japan	
Win	3-1-3	Yohei Suzuki	Decision (Unanimous)	Shooto: Gig Central 2	October 6, 2002	2	5:00	Nagoya, Aichi, Japan	
Draw	2-1-3	Masato Fujiwara	Draw	Shooto: Gig East 10	August 27, 2002	2	5:00	Tokyo, Japan	
Win	2-1-2	Takayuki Okochi	Decision (Majority)	Shooto: Gig Central 1	March 31, 2002	2	5:00	Nagoya, Aichi, Japan	
Draw	1-1-2	Tsutomu Shiiki	Draw	Shooto: Treasure Hunt 3	February 11, 2002	2	5:00	Kobe, Hyogo, Japan	
Draw	1-1-1	Kenichiro Togashi	Draw	Shooto: To The Top 10	November 25, 2001	2	5:00	Tokyo, Japan	
Loss	1-1	Naoto Kojima	Decision (Unanimous)	Shooto: Gig East 5	August 15, 2001	2	5:00	Tokyo, Japan	
Win	1-0	Takuhito Hida	Decision (Unanimous)	Shooto: Gig East 3	June 14, 2001	2	5:00	Tokyo, Japan	

== See also ==
- List of male mixed martial artists
