= 2003 in Shooto =

Mixed martial arts events

Information
- First date: January 24, 2003
- Last date: December 14, 2003

Events
- Total events: 17

Fights
- Total fights: 140
- Title fights: 5

Chronology
2002 in Shooto	2003 in Shooto	2004 in Shooto

The year 2003 is the 15th year in the history of Shooto, a mixed martial arts promotion based in Japan. In 2003 Shooto held 17 events beginning with, Shooto: 1/24 in Korakuen Hall.

== Title fights ==
Title fights in 2003
Weight class				Method	Round	Time	Event	Notes
Lightweight	Joachim Hansen	def.	Takanori Gomi (c)	Decision (Majority)	3	5:00	Shooto: 8/10 in Yokohama Cultural Gymnasium	(Note: For the Lightweight Championship.)
Featherweight	Alexandre Franca Nogueira (c)	vs.	Stephen Palling	Draw	3	5:00	Shooto: 8/10 in Yokohama Cultural Gymnasium	(Note: For the Featherweight Championship.)
Bantamweight	Ryota Matsune	def.	Masahiro Oishi (c)	Decision (Majority)	3	5:00	Shooto: 8/10 in Yokohama Cultural Gymnasium	(Note: For the Bantamweight Championship.)
Lightweight	Vítor Ribeiro	def.	Joachim Hansen (c)	Submission (Arm-Triangle Choke)	2	2:37	Shooto: Year End Show 2003	(Note: For the Lightweight Championship.)
Flyweight	Mamoru Yamaguchi	def.	Yasuhiro Urushitani	Decision (Unanimous)	3	5:00	Shooto: Year End Show 2003	(Note: For the Flyweight Championship.)

== Events list ==
#	Event Title	Date	Arena	Location
141	Shooto: Year End Show 2003	December 14, 2003	Tokyo Bay NK Hall	Urayasu, Chiba, Japan
140	Shooto: 11/25 in Kitazawa Town Hall	November 25, 2003	Kitazawa Town Hall	Setagaya, Tokyo, Japan
139	Shooto: Wanna Shooto 2003	November 3, 2003	Korakuen Hall	Tokyo, Japan
138	Shooto: Who is Young Leader!	October 31, 2003	Kitazawa Town Hall	Tokyo, Japan
137	Shooto: Gig West 4	October 12, 2003	Namba Grand Kagetsu Studio	Osaka, Kansai, Japan
136	Shooto: Gig Central 4	September 21, 2003	Port Messe Nagoya	Nagoya, Aichi, Japan
135	Shooto: 9/5 in Korakuen Hall	September 5, 2003	Korakuen Hall	Tokyo, Japan
134	Shooto: 8/10 in Yokohama Cultural Gymnasium	August 10, 2003	Yokohama Cultural Gymnasium	Yokohama, Kanagawa, Japan
133	Shooto: 7/13 in Korakuen Hall	July 13, 2003	Korakuen Hall	Tokyo, Japan
132	Shooto 2003: 6/27 in Hiroshima Sun Plaza	June 27, 2003	Hiroshima Sun Plaza	Hiroshima, Japan
131	Shooto: Shooter's Dream 2	May 30, 2003	Kitazawa Town Hall	Setagaya, Tokyo, Japan
130	Shooto: 5/4 in Korakuen Hall	May 4, 2003	Korakuen Hall	Tokyo, Japan
129	Shooto: Gig Central 3	March 30, 2003	Nagoya Civic Assembly Hall	Nagoya, Aichi, Japan
128	Shooto: 3/18 in Korakuen Hall	March 18, 2003	Korakuen Hall	Tokyo, Japan
127	Shooto: 2/23 in Korakuen Hall	February 23, 2003	Korakuen Hall	Tokyo, Japan
126	Shooto: 2/6 in Kitazawa Town Hall	February 6, 2003	Kitazawa Town Hall	Setagaya, Tokyo, Japan
125	Shooto: 1/24 in Korakuen Hall	January 24, 2003	Korakuen Hall	Tokyo, Japan

== Shooto: 1/24 in Korakuen Hall ==
Shooto: 1/24 in Korakuen Hall was an event held on January 24, 2003, at Korakuen Hall in Tokyo, Japan.

=== Results ===
Main Card
Weight class				Method	Round	Time	Notes
	Joao Roque	def.	Naoya Uematsu	Decision (Unanimous)	3	5:00
	Takaharu Murahama	def.	Chris Brennan	Submission (Achilles Lock)	1	2:49
	Katsuya Toida	def.	Rami Boukai	Decision (Majority)	2	5:00
	Ryuta Sakurai	def.	Yuichi Nakanishi	Decision (Unanimous)	2	5:00
	Erica Montoya	def.	Naoko Torashima	Submission (Armbar)	2	4:50
	Hirosumi Sugiura	vs.	Hisaki Hiraishi	Draw	2	5:00
	Tomonari Kanomata	def.	Yoshinori Amari	Submission (Armbar)	1	4:16
	Seigi Fujioka	def.	Naosuke Mizoguchi	Decision (Split)	2	5:00
	Shinichi Hanawa	def.	Tetsuya Akihisa	Submission (Triangle Choke)	2	3:25

== Shooto: 2/6 in Kitazawa Town Hall ==
Shooto: 2/6 in Kitazawa Town Hall was an event held on February 6, 2003, at Kitazawa Town Hall in Setagaya, Tokyo, Japan.

=== Results ===
Main Card
Weight class				Method	Round	Time	Notes
	Mitsuhiro Ishida	def.	Kotetsu Boku	Decision (Unanimous)	2	5:00
	Jin Kazeta	def.	Yohei Nanbu	TKO (Knee and Punches)	1	3:30
	Daiji Takahashi	def.	Toshiteru Ishii	Decision (Unanimous)	2	5:00
	Mitsuo Matsumoto	def.	Hiroki Kotani	Decision (Majority)	2	5:00
	Hiroyuki Takaya	def.	Hayate Usui	TKO (Punches)	2	2:06
	Takehiko Hata	def.	Yasushi Watanabe	Decision (Unanimous)	2	5:00
	Takayuki Tanaka	vs.	Hiroyuki Tanaka	Draw	2	5:00
	Katsuhisa Akasaki	def.	Nat McIntyre	Submission (Heel Hook)	2	3:34

== Shooto: 2/23 in Korakuen Hall ==
Shooto: 2/23 in Korakuen Hall was an event held on February 23, 2003, at Korakuen Hall in Tokyo, Japan.

=== Results ===
Main Card
Weight class				Method	Round	Time	Notes
	Takanori Gomi	def.	Nick Ertl	Submission (Armbar)	1	4:59
	Ryota Matsune	def.	Kimihito Nonaka	Decision (Majority)	3	5:00
	Kentaro Imaizumi	def.	Shuichiro Katsumura	Decision (Unanimous)	3	5:00
	Dustin Denes	vs.	Shiko Yamashita	Draw	1	3:48
	Kohei Yasumi	def.	Takeshi Yamazaki	KO (Punches)	1	1:21
	Ryuta Sakurai	def.	John Renken	Submission (Kimura)	2	3:09
	Akira Kikuchi	def.	Toru Nakayama	TKO (Punches)	1	2:53
	Audrey Kruyning	vs.	Ikuma Hoshino	Draw	2	5:00

== Shooto: 3/18 in Korakuen Hall ==
Shooto: 3/18 in Korakuen Hall was an event held on March 18, 2003, at Korakuen Hall in Tokyo, Japan.

=== Results ===
Main Card
Weight class				Method	Round	Time	Notes
	Joachim Hansen	def.	Rumina Sato	TKO (Punches)	1	2:09
	Shonie Carter	def.	Seichi Ikemoto	Decision (Unanimous)	3	5:00
	Tetsuo Katsuta	def.	Hideki Kadowaki	Decision (Unanimous)	3	5:00
	Mamoru Yamaguchi	def.	Homare Kuboyama	Decision (Unanimous)	3	5:00
	Tetsuji Kato	def.	Brian Gassaway	Decision (Unanimous)	3	5:00
	Takaharu Murahama	def.	Thomas Hytten	Decision (Unanimous)	2	5:00
	Junji Ikoma	def.	Tomohiro Hashi	Submission (Kimura)	1	3:20
	Akitoshi Tamura	def.	Masatoshi Kobayashi	Decision (Unanimous)	2	5:00
	Yohei Mikami	def.	Kyle Takao	Decision (Unanimous)	2	5:00
	Hiroyasu Kodera	def.	Takeshi Sato	Decision (Unanimous)	2	5:00
	Kenji Osawa	def.	Manabu Kano	Submission (Rear-Naked Choke)	2	3:21

== Shooto: Gig Central 3 ==
Shooto: Gig Central 3 was an event held on March 30, 2003, at The Nagoya Civic Assembly Hall in Nagoya, Aichi, Japan.

=== Results ===
Main Card
Weight class				Method	Round	Time	Notes
	Daisuke Sugie	def.	Takayuki Okochi	Decision (Unanimous)	2	5:00
	Naoki Matsushita	def.	Masato Fujiwara	Decision (Unanimous)	2	5:00
	Hiroshi Umemura	def.	Hiroki Kita	Decision (Unanimous)	2	5:00
	Hatsu Hioki	def.	Yoshinori Amari	Submission (Armbar)	2	2:38
	Akitoshi Hokazono	def.	Akira Kibe	Decision (Unanimous)	2	5:00
	Yasuhiro Akagi	def.	Kenichi Sawada	Decision (Majority)	2	5:00
	Keisuke Kurata	def.	Katsuhisa Akasaki	TKO (Cut)	1	2:35

== Shooto: 5/4 in Korakuen Hall ==
Shooto: 5/4 in Korakuen Hall was an event held on May 4, 2003, at Korakuen Hall in Tokyo, Japan.

=== Results ===
Main Card
Weight class				Method	Round	Time	Notes
	Ryota Matsune	def.	Kentaro Imaizumi	Decision (Majority)	3	5:00
	Vítor Ribeiro	def.	Ryan Bow	Decision (Unanimous)	3	5:00
	Yasuhiro Urushitani	def.	Robson Moura	Decision (Split)	3	5:00
	Shiko Yamashita	vs.	Martijn de Jong	Draw	3	5:00
	Marcos Galvao	def.	Masato Shiozawa	Decision (Majority)	3	5:00
	Hideki Kadowaki	def.	Makoto Ishikawa	Decision (Unanimous)	3	5:00
	Masatoshi Abe	vs.	Junji Ikoma	Draw	2	5:00
	Yasuyuki Tokuoka	vs.	Shigetoshi Iwase	Draw	2	5:00
	Yoichi Fukumoto	def.	Hirosumi Sugiura	Decision (Unanimous)	2	5:00
	Tomonari Kanomata	def.	Masaya Takita	Submission (Armbar)	1	4:49

== Shooto: Shooter's Dream 2 ==
Shooto: Shooter's Dream 2 was an event held on May 30, 2003, at Kitazawa Town Hall in Setagaya, Tokyo, Japan.

=== Results ===
Main Card
Weight class				Method	Round	Time	Notes
	Tatsuya Kawajiri	def.	Takumi Nakayama	TKO (Punches)	1	3:44
	Nobuhiro Obiya	def.	Heima Hashimoto	Decision (Unanimous)	2	5:00
	Takamitsu Oba	def.	Toru Nakayama	TKO (Cut)	2	0:12
	Takehiro Harusaki	def.	Takehiro Ishii	Decision (Unanimous)	2	5:00
	Issei Tsurumi	def.	Takahisa Toyoshima	TKO (Swollen Eye)	2	0:46
	Takeshi Inoue	def.	Hayate Usui	Decision (Unanimous)	2	5:00
	Ganjo Tentsuku	def.	Takuhito Hida	TKO (Punches)	1	4:11

== Shooto 2003: 6/27 in Hiroshima Sun Plaza ==
Shooto 2003: 6/27 in Hiroshima Sun Plaza was an event held on June 27, 2003, at The Hiroshima Sun Plaza in Hiroshima, Japan.

=== Results ===
Main Card
Weight class				Method	Round	Time	Notes
	Rumina Sato	def.	Ryan Ackerman	Submission (Heel Hook)	1	2:12
	Akira Kikuchi	def.	Seichi Ikemoto	Submission (Armbar)	2	1:28
	Kenichiro Togashi	def.	Kotetsu Boku	Submission (Armbar)	1	2:48
	Takashi Nakakura	def.	Masato Fujiwara	Submission (Triangle Choke)	1	3:48
	Hirofumi Hara	vs.	Shinobu Ito	Draw	2	5:00
	Yosuke Mikami	def.	Masato Nishiguchi	Decision (Unanimous)	2	5:00
	Seigi Fujioka	def.	Masatoshi Kobayashi	Decision (Unanimous)	2	5:00
	Hiroyuki Tanaka	def.	Yoshihiro Fujita	Decision (Unanimous)	2	5:00
	Fumio Usami	def.	Naosuke Mizoguchi	TKO (Punches)	1	4:05

== Shooto: 7/13 in Korakuen Hall ==
Shooto: 7/13 in Korakuen Hall was an event held on July 13, 2003, at Korakuen Hall in Tokyo, Japan.

=== Results ===
Main Card
Weight class				Method	Round	Time	Notes
	Jutaro Nakao	def.	Sauli Heilimo	Submission (Reverse Triangle Choke)	2	0:39
	Marcio Ramos Barbosa	def.	Takaharu Murahama	TKO (Cut)	1	4:09
	Naoya Uematsu	def.	Jin Kazeta	Submission (Armbar)	1	1:38
	Mitsuhiro Ishida	vs.	Naoki Matsushita	Draw	2	5:00
	Hiroshi Komatsu	def.	Aritano Silva Barbosa	Submission (Rear Naked Choke)	1	3:31
	Hiroyuki Takaya	def.	Hatsu Hioki	Decision (Unanimous)	2	5:00
	Akitoshi Hokazono	def.	Hiroki Kita	TKO (Punches)	1	3:07
	Seiji Ozuka	def.	Luciano Azevedo	Decision (Unanimous)	2	5:00

== Shooto: 8/10 in Yokohama Cultural Gymnasium ==
Shooto: 8/10 in Yokohama Cultural Gymnasium was an event held on August 10, 2003, at Yokohama Cultural Gymnasium in Yokohama, Kanagawa, Japan.

=== Results ===
Main Card
Weight class				Method	Round	Time	Notes
Lightweight	Joachim Hansen	def.	Takanori Gomi (c)	Decision (Majority)	3	5:00	(Note: For the Lightweight Championship.)
Featherweight	Alexandre Franca Nogueira (c)	vs.	Stephen Palling	Draw	3	5:00	(Note: For the Featherweight Championship.)
Bantamweight	Ryota Matsune	def.	Masahiro Oishi (c)	Decision (Majority)	3	5:00	(Note: For the Bantamweight Championship.)
	Jake Shields	def.	Akira Kikuchi	Decision (Unanimous)	3	5:00
	Tatsuya Kawajiri	def.	Yves Edwards	Decision (Unanimous)	3	5:00
	Junji Ikoma	def.	Hiroaki Yoshioka	Technical Submission (Rear-Naked Choke)	2	3:26
	Masatoshi Abe	def.	Daiji Takahashi	Decision (Unanimous)	2	5:00

== Shooto: 9/5 in Korakuen Hall ==
Shooto: 9/5 in Korakuen Hall was an event held on September 5, 2003, at Korakuen Hall in Tokyo, Japan.

=== Results ===
Main Card
Weight class				Method	Round	Time	Notes
	Norifumi Yamamoto	def.	Caleb Mitchell	KO (Punch)	1	0:40
	Luiz Firmino	def.	Kohei Yasumi	Decision (Unanimous)	3	5:00
	Masato Shiozawa	def.	Akira Komatsu	Submission (Rear Naked Choke)	2	4:19
	Hideki Kadowaki	def.	Denisas Archirejevas	Submission (Armbar)	1	3:45
	Kestutis Smirnovas	def.	Masaya Inoue	TKO (Retirement)	1	5:00
	Yohei Mikami	def.	Kenji Osawa	Decision (Unanimous)	2	5:00
	Yoichi Fukumoto	def.	Shinobu Ito	Submission (Armbar)	1	4:24
	Akihiko Adachi	def.	Yosuke Mikami	Decision (Unanimous)	2	5:00
	Takehiro Ishii	def.	Takahisa Toyoshima	Submission (Triangle Choke)	2	3:35
	Takehiro Harusaki	def.	Issei Tsurumi	Submission (Rear Naked Choke)	2	4:43

== Shooto: Gig Central 4 ==
Shooto: Gig Central 4 was an event held on September 21, 2003, at Port Messe Nagoya in Nagoya, Aichi, Japan.

=== Results ===
Main Card
Weight class				Method	Round	Time	Notes
	Joao Roque	def.	Hiroyuki Abe	Submission (Armbar)	2	4:59
	Kentaro Imaizumi	def.	Jeremy Bolt	Submission (Guillotine Choke)	2	2:45
	Daisuke Sugie	def.	Tom Kirk	Submission (Armbar)	1	2:56
	Kotetsu Boku	def.	Naoki Matsushita	TKO (Punches)	2	1:15
	Hiroyuki Tanaka	def.	Hiroshi Umemura	Submission (Triangle Choke)	2	4:21
	Yasuhiro Akagi	def.	Shinichi Hanawa	Decision (Majority)	2	5:00
	Hiroyasu Kodera	def.	Keisuke Kurata	KO (Punch)	1	0:08
	Akira Kibe	def.	Manabu Kano	Submission (Kimura)	1	1:45
	Hisaki Hiraishi	def.	Hirofumi Hara	Decision (Unanimous)	2	5:00

== Shooto: Gig West 4 ==
Shooto: Gig West 4 was an event held on October 12, 2003, at The Namba Grand Kagetsu Studio in Osaka, Japan.

=== Results ===
Main Card
Weight class				Method	Round	Time	Notes
	Seichi Ikemoto	vs.	Yasuyuki Tokuoka	Draw	2	5:00
	Takashi Nakakura	def.	Saburo Kawakatsu	Decision (Unanimous)	2	5:00
	Katsuhiko Ochiai	def.	Kaichi Tsuji	Decision (Unanimous)	2	5:00
	Komei Okada	vs.	Takamitsu Oba	Draw	2	5:00
	Jun Kitagawa	def.	Hirosumi Sugiura	Decision (Unanimous)	2	5:00
	Masato Nishiguchi	def.	Masashi Kita	Decision (Unanimous)	2	5:00
	Kenichi Sawada	vs.	Tetsuya Akihisa	Draw	2	5:00

== Shooto: Who is Young Leader! ==
Shooto: Who is Young Leader! was an event held on October 31, 2003, at Kitazawa Town Hall in Tokyo, Japan.

=== Results ===
Main Card
Weight class				Method	Round	Time	Notes
	Junji Ikoma	def.	Takeyasu Hirono	Decision (Unanimous)	3	5:00
	Nobuhiro Obiya	def.	Tomonari Kanomata	TKO (Punches)	1	0:11
	Takehiro Ishii	def.	Issei Tsurumi	Decision (Unanimous)	2	5:00
	Takeshi Inoue	def.	Masanori Sugatani	TKO (Cut)	1	3:04
	Ganjo Tentsuku	def.	Koji Takeuchi	Decision (Unanimous)	2	5:00
	So Tazawa	def.	Takahiro Hosoi	Technical Submission (Kimura)	1	0:58
	Junichi Sase	def.	Shinichi Kojima	Decision (Unanimous)	2	5:00

== Shooto: Wanna Shooto 2003 ==
Shooto: Wanna Shooto 2003 was an event held on November 3, 2003, at Korakuen Hall in Tokyo, Japan.

=== Results ===
Main Card
Weight class				Method	Round	Time	Notes
	Naoya Uematsu	def.	Katsuya Toida	Submission (Achilles Lock)	1	4:06
	Tetsuo Katsuta	vs.	Makoto Ishikawa	Technical Draw	1	1:22
	John Olav Einemo	def.	Mindaugas Kulikauskas	Submission (Armbar)	1	0:47
	Shuichiro Katsumura	def.	Eugenij Konkov	Submission (Rear-Naked Choke)	1	2:48
	Hiroyuki Takaya	def.	Seigi Fujioka	Decision (Unanimous)	2	5:00
	Akitoshi Tamura	def.	Yohei Nanbu	Decision (Unanimous)	2	5:00
	Kenji Osawa	def.	Augusto Frota	Submission (Arm-Triangle Choke)	2	4:24
	Shigetoshi Iwase	def.	Nico Nasieri	Decision (Majority)	2	5:00

== Shooto: 11/25 in Kitazawa Town Hall ==
Shooto: 11/25 in Kitazawa Town Hall was an event held on November 25, 2003, at Kitazawa Town Hall in Setagaya, Tokyo, Japan.

=== Results ===
Main Card
Weight class				Method	Round	Time	Notes
	Akitoshi Hokazono	def.	Yohei Mikami	Decision (Unanimous)	2	5:00
	Yoichi Fukumoto	def.	Komei Okada	KO (Head Kick)	2	3:18
	Yasuhiro Akagi	def.	Hiroyasu Kodera	Decision (Unanimous)	2	5:00
	Akihiko Adachi	vs.	Katsuhiko Ochiai	Draw	2	5:00
	Takashi Ochi	def.	Mario Stapel	DQ (Knee to the Head on the Ground)	1	0:00
	Keisuke Yamada	def.	Hayate Usui	Decision (Majority)	2	5:00
	Yutaka Tetsuka	def.	Kenichi Sawada	Decision (Unanimous)	2	5:00
	Daniel Weichel	def.	Masaya Takita	Decision (Unanimous)	2	5:00

== Shooto: Year End Show 2003 ==
Shooto: Year End Show 2003 was an event held on December 14, 2003, at The Tokyo Bay NK Hall in Urayasu, Chiba, Japan.

=== Results ===
Main Card
Weight class				Method	Round	Time	Notes
Lightweight	Vítor Ribeiro	def.	Joachim Hansen (c)	Submission (Arm-Triangle Choke)	2	2:37	(Note: For the Lightweight Championship.)
	Alexandre Franca Nogueira	def.	Rumina Sato	Submission (Guillotine Choke)	1	0:41
Flyweight	Mamoru Yamaguchi	def.	Yasuhiro Urushitani	Decision (Unanimous)	3	5:00	(Note: For the Flyweight Championship.)
	Tatsuya Kawajiri	def.	Ryan Bow	TKO (Punches)	1	4:21
	Robson Moura	def.	Junji Ikoma	Decision (Unanimous)	3	5:00
	Hideki Kadowaki	def.	Bao Quach	Submission (Rear-Naked Choke)	3	4:40
	Masato Shiozawa	def.	Alex Khanbabian	Submission (Rear-Naked Choke)	2	1:04

== See also ==
- Shooto
- List of Shooto champions
- List of Shooto Events
