= Jun Kitagawa =

Japanese mixed martial artist

Jun Kitagawa 北川淳
- Born: July 14, 1973 (age 53); Japan
- Other names: Gonzui
- Nationality: Japanese
- Height: 6 ft 1 in (1.85 m)
- Weight: 167 lb (76 kg; 11.9 st)
- Division: Welterweight
- Team: Gonzui's Gym
- Years active: 1997 - 2006

Mixed martial arts record
- Total: 14
- Wins: 4
- By decision: 4
- Losses: 8
- By knockout: 2
- By submission: 2
- By decision: 4
- Draws: 2

Other information
- Mixed martial arts record from Sherdog

Jun Kitagawa Japanese: 北川淳 (born July 14, 1973) is a Japanese mixed martial artist. He competed in the Welterweight division.

== Mixed martial arts record ==
Professional record breakdown
14 matches	4 wins	8 losses
By knockout	0	2
By submission	0	2
By decision	4	4
Draws	2	

Res.	Record	Opponent	Method	Event	Date	Round	Time	Location	Notes
Draw	4-8-2	Masashi Yozen	Draw	Shooto: Gig West 5	June 3, 2006	2	5:00	Osaka, Kansai, Japan	
Loss	4-8-1	Keita Nakamura	Decision (unanimous)	Shooto: 6/3 in Kitazawa Town Hall	June 3, 2005	2	5:00	Tokyo, Japan	
Draw	4-7-1	Hirofumi Hara	Draw	Shooto 2004: 10/17 in Osaka Prefectural Gymnasium	October 17, 2004	2	5:00	Osaka, Kansai, Japan	
Loss	4-7	Chris Brown	TKO (cut)	Shooto Australia: NHB	February 12, 2004	2	1:31	Melbourne, Australia	
Win	4-6	Hirosumi Sugiura	Decision (unanimous)	Shooto: Gig West 4	October 12, 2003	2	5:00	Osaka, Japan	
Loss	3-6	Ryuta Sakurai	TKO (cut)	Shooto: Gig West 3	October 27, 2002	1	3:23	Osaka, Japan	
Loss	3-5	Shiko Yamashita	Decision (majority)	Shooto: Treasure Hunt 5	March 15, 2002	2	5:00	Tokyo, Japan	
Win	3-4	Tomoki Kanuka	Decision (unanimous)	Shooto: Gig East 4	July 27, 2001	2	5:00	Tokyo, Japan	
Win	2-4	Masashi Kita	Decision (unanimous)	Shooto: Gig West 1	February 18, 2001	2	5:00	Osaka, Japan	
Loss	1-4	John Calvo	Decision (unanimous)	Shooto: R.E.A.D. 1	January 14, 2000	2	5:00	Tokyo, Japan	
Loss	1-3	Masaya Inoue	Decision (unanimous)	Shooto: Renaxis 5	October 29, 1999	2	5:00	Kadoma, Osaka, Japan	
Win	1-2	Ryuta Sakurai	Decision (unanimous)	Shooto: Renaxis 3	August 4, 1999	2	5:00	Setagaya, Tokyo, Japan	
Loss	0-2	Anthony Netzler	Submission (toe hold)	Shooto: Las Grandes Viajes 4	July 29, 1998	1	1:14	Tokyo, Japan	
Loss	0-1	Sanae Kikuta	Submission (achilles lock)	Lumax Cup: Tournament of J '97 Heavyweight Tournament	July 27, 1997	1	3:14	Japan	

== See also ==
- List of male mixed martial artists
