= Masashi Kita =

Japanese mixed martial arts fighter

Masashi Kita 北正志
- Born: Japan
- Nationality: Japanese
- Height: 5 ft 8 in (1.73 m)
- Weight: 183 lb (83 kg; 13.1 st)
- Division: Middleweight
- Team: Team Ikazuchi
- Years active: 1998 - 2003

Mixed martial arts record
- Total: 4
- Wins: 1
- By submission: 1
- Losses: 3
- By knockout: 1
- By decision: 2

Other information
- Mixed martial arts record from Sherdog

Masashi Kita Japanese: 北正志 is a Japanese mixed martial artist. He competed in the Middleweight division.

== Mixed martial arts record ==
Professional record breakdown
4 matches	1 win	3 losses
By knockout	0	1
By submission	1	0
By decision	0	2

Res.	Record	Opponent	Method	Event	Date	Round	Time	Location	Notes
Loss	1-3	Masato Nishiguchi	Decision (unanimous)	Shooto: Gig West 4	October 12, 2003	2	5:00	Osaka, Japan	
Loss	1-2	Jun Kitagawa	Decision (unanimous)	Shooto: Gig West 1	February 18, 2001	2	5:00	Osaka, Japan	
Win	1-1	Ryota Ibaraki	Submission (armbar)	Shooto: R.E.A.D. 3	April 2, 2000	1	4:03	Kadoma, Osaka, Japan	
Loss	0-1	Ryuta Sakurai	TKO (punches)	Shooto: Shooter's Dream	September 18, 1998	1	3:00	Setagaya, Tokyo, Japan	

== See also ==
- List of male mixed martial artists
