= Vítor Ribeiro =

Brazilian martial artist

- Born: Vitor de Souza Ribeiro; February 24, 1979 (age 47); Rio de Janeiro, Brazil
- Other names: Shaolin
- Height: 5 ft 8 in (1.73 m)
- Weight: 156 lb (71 kg; 11 st 2 lb)
- Division: Lightweight
- Fighting out of: Rio de Janeiro, Brazil
- Team: Nova União
- Rank: 6th degree black belt in Brazilian jiu-jitsu under André Pederneiras
- Years active: 2001–2010

Mixed martial arts record
- Total: 25
- Wins: 20
- By knockout: 2
- By submission: 12
- By decision: 6
- Losses: 5
- By knockout: 2
- By decision: 3

Other information
- Mixed martial arts record from Sherdog

Vítor Ribeiro
Medal record

Representing Brazil

Men's Submission Wrestling

ADCC World Championship
Bronze medal – third place	2003	-77 kg

Brazilian Jiu-Jitsu

Brazilian National Championship
Gold medal – first place	1996	-70kg
Gold medal – first place	1998	-70kg
Silver medal – second place	1999	-76kg

World Master Jiu-Jitsu Championship
Gold medal – first place	2016	-76kg

World Jiu-Jitsu Championship
Gold medal – first place	1996 Rio de Janeiro, Brazil	-70kg (purple)
Silver medal – second place	1997 Rio de Janeiro, Brazil	-70kg
Gold medal – first place	1999 Rio de Janeiro, Brazil	-76kg
Gold medal – first place	2000 Rio de Janeiro, Brazil	-76kg
Gold medal – first place	2001 Rio de Janeiro, Brazil	-82kg

Pan-American Championship
Gold medal – first place	1996	-70kg (brown)
Silver medal – second place	1997	-76kg

Vítor de Souza Ribeiro (born February 24, 1979) is a retired professional mixed martial artist who competed in the Lightweight division. A professional competitor since 2001, he has formerly competed for Strikeforce, Shooto, DREAM, Cage Rage, Cage Force, the World Fighting Alliance, and K-1 HERO'S. Ribeiro is the former Cage Rage World Lightweight Champion and the former Shooto World Lightweight Champion.

== Professional grappling career ==
Vitor Ribeiro is an accomplished grappler. He has won the CBJJ Mundials (Brazilian Jiu-Jitsu World Championship) four times, once as a purple belt in 1996 and three times as a black belt in three consecutive years (1999, 2000, and 2001). He competed in the ADCC World Championship in 2000 and 2003.

Ribeiro competed against Adriano Silva in a superfight at BJJ Stars 12 on April 27, 2024. He lost the match on advantages.

== Mixed martial arts career ==
After a brief absence from the MMA world, Ribeiro returned to competition at DREAM 8, where he dominated former Olympic wrestler Katsuhiko Nagata ending the fight with a TKO. In his next fight at DREAM 10, he lost to Shinya Aoki via unanimous decision.

On September 24, 2009, it was announced that he had signed a multi-fight deal with Strikeforce.

Ribeiro made his promotional debut on May 15, 2010, against undefeated Lyle Beerbohm and lost the bout via split decision.

Ribeiro's next fight for Strikeforce came against Justin Wilcox at Strikeforce Challengers: Wilcox vs. Ribeiro. He lost the fight via unanimous decision.

On August 8, 2013, Ribeiro announced that he has retired from a mixed martial arts competition.

In 2015, Ribeiro transitioned to becoming a referee for mixed martial arts shows. He debuted as a referee for UFC events on April 18, 2015, at UFC on Fox: Machida vs. Rockhold.

Vitor is currently the head BJJ instructor at his Manhattan academy as well as in Scotch Plains, NJ.

== Brazilian Jiu-Jitsu lineage ==
Mitsuyo Maeda » Carlos Gracie Sr. » Carlson Gracie » André Pederneiras » Vitor Ribeiro

== Championships and Accomplishments ==
=== Mixed martial arts ===
- Cage Rage
  - Cage Rage World Lightweight Championship (One time)
  - Two successful title defenses
- Hero's
  - 2007 HERO'S Middleweight Grand Prix Semifinalist
- Shooto
  - Shooto World Lightweight Championship (One time)

=== Grappling ===
- CBJJ Brazilian Team Championships
  - 2001 Brown/Black Belt Leve: Nova União, 1st Place
  - 2000 Brown/Black Belt Leve: Nova União, 1st Place
  - 1999 Brown/Black Belt Leve: Nova União A, 1st Place
  - 1998 Brown/Black Belt Leve: Nova União, 2nd Place
  - 1997 Brown/Black Belt Leve: Nova União (A), 1st Place
  - 1996 Brown/Black Belt Leve: Nova União, 2nd Place

== Mixed martial arts record ==
Professional record breakdown
25 matches	20 wins	5 losses
By knockout	2	2
By submission	12	0
By decision	6	3

Res.	Record	Opponent	Method	Event	Date	Round	Time	Location	Notes
Loss	20–5	Justin Wilcox	Decision (unanimous)	Strikeforce Challengers: Wilcox vs. Ribeiro	November 19, 2010	3	5:00	Jackson, Mississippi, United States	
Loss	20–4	Lyle Beerbohm	Decision (split)	Strikeforce: Heavy Artillery	May 15, 2010	3	5:00	St. Louis, Missouri, United States	
Loss	20–3	Shinya Aoki	Decision (unanimous)	DREAM 10	July 20, 2009	2	5:00	Saitama, Saitama, Japan	
Win	20–2	Katsuhiko Nagata	TKO (doctor stoppage)	DREAM 8	April 5, 2009	1	7:58	Nagoya, Japan	
Loss	19–2	Gesias Cavalcante	KO (punches)	HERO'S 10	September 17, 2007	1	0:35	Yokohama, Japan	HERO'S 2007 Lightweight Grand Prix Semi-Final.
Win	19–1	Kazuyuki Miyata	Submission (arm-triangle choke)	HERO's 9	July 16, 2007	2	1:54	Yokohama, Japan	HERO'S 2007 Lightweight Grand Prix Quarter-Final.
Win	18–1	Ryuki Ueyama	Submission (triangle armbar)	HERO'S 8	March 12, 2007	1	1:48	Nagoya, Japan	
Win	17–1	Daisuke Nakamura	Submission (straight armbar)	Cage Rage 19	December 9, 2006	1	3:55	London, England	Defended Cage Rage World Lightweight Championship
Win	16–1	Abdul Mohamed	Submission (kimura)	Cage Rage 18	September 30, 2006	1	4:27	London, England	Defended Cage Rage World Lightweight Championship
Win	15–1	Chris Brennan	Submission (swollen eye)	GFC: Team Gracie vs Team Hammer House	March 3, 2006	2	3:25	Columbus, Ohio, United States	
Win	14–1	Eiji Mitsuoka	Decision (unanimous)	MARS	February 4, 2006	3	5:00	Tokyo, Japan	
Win	13–1	Jean Silva	Submission (arm triangle choke)	Cage Rage 13	September 10, 2005	2	4:18	London, England	Won Cage Rage World Lightweight Championship
Win	12–1	Gerald Strebendt	Submission (guillotine choke)	Cage Rage 12	July 2, 2005	1	1:13	London, England	
Win	11–1	Tetsuji Kato	Submission (arm triangle choke)	Rumble on the Rock 7	May 7, 2005	3	2:32	Honolulu, Hawaii, United States	
Loss	10–1	Tatsuya Kawajiri	TKO (punches)	Shooto: Year End Show 2004	December 14, 2004	2	3:11	Tokyo, Japan	Lost Shooto World Lightweight Championship
Win	10–0	Mitsuhiro Ishida	Decision (unanimous)	Shooto Hawaii: Soljah Fight Night	July 9, 2004	3	5:00	Honolulu, Hawaii, United States	
Win	9–0	Joachim Hansen	Submission (arm triangle choke)	Shooto: Year End Show 2003	December 14, 2003	2	2:37	Urayasu, Chiba, Japan	Won Shooto World Lightweight Championship
Win	8–0	Ivan Menjivar	Decision (unanimous)	Absolute Fighting Championships 4	July 19, 2003	3	5:00	Fort Lauderdale, Florida, United States	
Win	7–0	Ryan Bow	Decision (unanimous)	Shooto: 5/4 in Korakuen Hall	May 4, 2003	3	5:00	Tokyo, Japan	
Win	6–0	Tatsuya Kawajiri	Decision (unanimous)	Shooto: Year End Show 2002	December 14, 2002	3	5:00	Urayasu, Chiba, Japan	
Win	5–0	Eddie Yagin	Submission (arm-triangle choke)	WFA 3: Level 3	November 23, 2002	2	2:23	Las Vegas, Nevada, United States	
Win	4–0	Hiroshi Tsuruya	Decision (unanimous)	Shooto: Treasure Hunt 10	September 16, 2002	3	5:00	Yokohama, Japan	
Win	3–0	Joe Hurley	Submission (arm-triangle choke)	WFA 2: Level 2	July 5, 2002	2	1:19	Las Vegas, Nevada, United States	
Win	2–0	Takumi Nakayama	Submission (arm-triangle choke)	HOOKnSHOOT: Relentless	May 25, 2002	1	0:51	Evansville, Indiana, United States	
Win	1–0	Charlie Kohler	TKO (cut)	World Fighting Alliance 1	November 3, 2001	1	3:50	Las Vegas, Nevada, United States	

== Submission grappling record ==
? Matches, ? Wins, ? Losses, ? Draws
Result	Weight class	Opponent	Method	Event	Date	Stage
Loss	ABS	PJ Barch	Armbar	Quintet 3	2018	SF
Loss	ABS	Gordon Ryan	Armbar	Quintet 3	2018	F
Win	73KG	Caol Uno	Short choke	Polaris 5	2017	SPF
Loss	82KG	Fernando Terere	Referee Decision	Polaris 4	2016	SPF
Win	76KG	Nakamura Daisuke	Choke from back	Polaris 2	2015	SPF
Win	ABS	Nino Schembri	Pts: 8x0	World Expo	2014	SPF
Win	77KG	Jason Ramsterrer	RNC	ADCC	2003	R1
Win	77KG	Pablo Popovitch	Points	ADCC	2003	4F
Loss	77KG	Marcelo Garcia	RNC	ADCC	2003	SF
Win	77KG	Chris Brown	Pts: 3x0	ADCC	2003	3PLC
Win	73KG	Michael O'Donnell	Choke	Arnold Classic	2003	4F
Win	73KG	Daniel Moraes	Pts: 2x0	Arnold Classic	2003	SF
Win	73KG	Daniel Moraes	Points	Arnold Classic	2002	F
Win	ABS	Flavio Fernandes	Armbar	Copa Leopoldina	2001	R1
Win	ABS	Rodrigo Fernandes	Ezekiel	Copa Leopoldina	2001	SF
Win	82KG	Bruno Fernandes	Choke	World Champ.	2001	SF
Win	82KG	Fernando Terere	Pts: 2x0	World Champ.	2001	F
Win	76KG	Leonardo Vieira	Pts: 2x0	World Champ.	2000	SF
Win	76KG	Marcio Feitosa	Pen	World Champ.	2000	F
Win	77KG	Rumina Sato	Pts: 4x0	ADCC	2000	R1
Loss	77KG	Leonardo Vieira	Adv	ADCC	2000	4F
Loss	ABS	Ricardo Almeida	Kneebar	ADCC	2000	4F
Loss	75KG	Leonardo Vieira	Pts: 6x4	Rio x Sao Paulo	2000	SPF
Win	76KG	Marcio Feitosa	Pts: 2x2, Adv	World Champ.	1999	F
Win	70KG	Marco Aurelio	Points	World Champ.	1997	SF
Loss	70KG	Royler Gracie	Adv	World Champ.	1997	F
Win	88KG	Alexandre Soca	Pts: 5x0	Team Nationals	1997	SF
Win	88KG	Octavio Couto	Pts: 18x0	Team Nationals	1997	F
Loss	76KG	Leonardo Vieira	Pts: 24x4	Copa Pele	1997	SPF
