= Tetsuji Kato =

Japanese mixed martial artist

Tetsuji Kato 加藤鉄史
- Born: Omiya
- Nationality: Japanese
- Height: 5 ft 7 in (170 cm)
- Weight: 154 lb (70 kg; 11.0 st)
- Division: Light Heavyweight; Welterweight; Lightweight
- Style: Judo
- Team: PUREBRED Saipan Trench Tech

Mixed martial arts record
- Total: 30
- Wins: 20
- By knockout: 3
- By submission: 8
- By decision: 9
- Losses: 10
- By knockout: 2
- By submission: 2
- By decision: 6

Other information
- Mixed martial arts record from Sherdog

Tetsuji Kato (Japanese: 加藤 鉄史, Katō Tetsuji) is a Japanese mixed martial artist who competed in the welterweight and lightweight divisions in Shooto, Strikeforce and DEEP. He was the SuperBrawl 7 Light Heavyweight Tournament winner, defeating Ben Hernandez in the finals.

== Championships and Accomplishments ==
- All Japan Amateur Shooto
  - 3rd All Japan Amateur Shooto Championship Welterweight Tournament Runner Up (1996)
- Icon Sport
  - SuperBrawl 7 Lightweight Tournament Winner

== Mixed martial arts record ==
Professional record breakdown
30 matches	20 wins	10 losses
By knockout	3	2
By submission	8	2
By decision	9	6

Res.	Record	Opponent	Method	Event	Date	Round	Time	Location	Notes
Win	20-10	Ilya Zelik	TKO (punches)	Trench Warz 11 - Redemption	December 18, 2009	2	2:11	Saipan, Northern Mariana Islands	
Loss	19-10	Yoshihiro Koyama	TKO (punches)	Shooto: Revolutionary Exchanges 3	November 23, 2009	2	1:12	Tokyo, Japan	
Loss	19-9	Kenichiro Togashi	Decision (majority)	Shooto: Shooto Tradition Final	May 10, 2009	3	5:00	Tokyo, Japan	
Loss	19-8	Gilbert Melendez	Decision (unanimous)	Strikeforce: Playboy Mansion	September 29, 2007	3	5:00	Beverly Hills, California, United States	
Loss	19-7	Joe Camacho	TKO	PXC 11 - No Turning Back	April 13, 2007	2		Guam	
Win	19-6	Alexei Maligin	Submission (rear naked choke)	Kokoro - Kill Or Be Killed	August 15, 2006	1	3:53	Tokyo, Japan	
Win	18-6	Toby Imada	TKO (punches)	FFCF 6 - Undisputed	June 21, 2006	1	0:13	Mangilao, Guam	
Loss	17-6	Vítor Ribeiro	Submission (arm triangle choke)	Rumble on the Rock 7	May 7, 2005	3	2:32	Hawaii, United States	
Win	17-5	Jason Dent	Decision	SB 35 - SuperBrawl 35	April 16, 2004	3	5:00	Hawaii, United States	Welterweight bout.
Loss	16-5	Adam Lynn	Decision	FFCF 1 - Fury Full Contact Fighting 1	January 10, 2004	4		Guam	
Loss	16-4	Dokonjonosuke Mishima	Decision (majority)	Deep - 12th Impact	September 15, 2003	3	5:00	Tokyo, Japan	
Win	16-3	Brian Gassaway	Decision (unanimous)	Shooto - 3/18 in Korakuen Hall	March 18, 2003	3	5:00	Tokyo, Japan	Welterweight bout.
Win	15-3	Seichi Ikemoto	Decision (unanimous)	Shooto - To The Top Final Act	December 16, 2001	3	5:00	Tokyo, Japan	
Win	14-3	Ray Cooper	Decision (unanimous)	Shooto - To The Top 6	July 6, 2001	3	5:00	Tokyo, Japan	
Loss	13-3	Anderson Silva	Decision (unanimous)	Shooto - To The Top 2	March 2, 2001	3	5:00	Tokyo, Japan	Welterweight bout.
Win	13-2	Dan Gilbert	Submission (rear naked choke)	Shooto - R.E.A.D. Final	December 17, 2000	1	4:28	Tokyo, Japan	Lightweight bout.
Win	12-2	Thomas Denny	Decision (unanimous)	Shooto - R.E.A.D. 10	September 15, 2000	3	5:00	Tokyo, Japan	Return to Lightweight.
Loss	11-2	Hayato Sakurai	Decision (split)	Shooto - R.E.A.D. 2	March 17, 2000	3	5:00	Tokyo, Japan	For the Shooto Welterweight Championship.
Win	11-1	Angelo Sergio	Submission (punches)	VTJ 1999 - Vale Tudo Japan 1999	December 11, 1999	1	7:45	Tokyo, Japan	
Win	10-1	Rhett Anthony	Submission (rear naked choke)	SB 14 - SuperBrawl 14	November 5, 1999	1	4:18	Guam	
Win	9-1	Jutaro Nakao	Decision (unanimous)	Shooto - 10th Anniversary Event	May 29, 1999	3	5:00	Yokohama, Japan	
Win	8-1	Hiroyuki Kojima	TKO (punches)	Shooto - Las Grandes Viajes 6	November 27, 1998	2	4:28	Tokyo, Japan	
Win	7-1	Alex Cook	Decision (unanimous)	Shooto - Las Grandes Viajes 5	August 29, 1998	3	5:00	Tokyo, Japan	Return to Welterweight.
Win	6-1	Ben Hernandez	Submission (rear naked choke)	SB 7 - SuperBrawl 7	April 25, 1998	1	1:38	Guam	SuperBrawl 7 Lightweight Tournament Finals; won the SuperBrawl 7 Light Heavyweight Tournament
Win	5-1	Luke Ishizaki	Submission (armbar)	SB 7 - SuperBrawl 7	April 25, 1998	1	1:43	Guam	SuperBrawl 7 Lightweight Tournament Semifinal.
Win	4-1	Patrick Madayag	Submission (choke)	SB 7 - SuperBrawl 7	April 25, 1998	1	3:33	Guam	SuperBrawl 7 Lightweight Tournament Quarterfinal.
Win	3-1	Koichi Tanaka	Technical Submission (armbar)	Shooto - Las Grandes Viajes 1	January 17, 1998	1	1:01	Tokyo, Japan	Return to Lightweight.
Loss	2-1	Jutaro Nakao	Submission (armbar)	Shooto - Reconquista 3	August 27, 1997	3	4:56	Tokyo, Japan	Welterweight debut.
Win	2-0	Masato Fujiwara	Decision (unanimous)	Shooto - Gig	June 25, 1997	2	5:00	Tokyo, Japan	
Win	1-0	Hiroyuki Kojima	Decision (unanimous)	Shooto - Reconquista 2	April 6, 1997	2	5:00	Tokyo, Japan	
