= Akihiko Adachi =

Japanese mixed martial arts fighter

Akihiko Adachi 安達明彦
- Born: November 12, 1965 (age 61); Sapporo, Hokkaido, Japan
- Nationality: Japanese
- Height: 5 ft 11 in (1.80 m)
- Weight: 200 lb (91 kg; 14 st)
- Division: Light Heavyweight; Middleweight
- Style: Judo, BJJ
- Fighting out of: Matsudo, Chiba Prefecture
- Team: Paraesta Matsudo
- Rank: 4th dan black belt in Judo; Black belt in Brazilian jiu-jitsu

Mixed martial arts record
- Total: 10
- Wins: 4
- By knockout: 1
- By submission: 1
- By decision: 2
- Losses: 4
- By knockout: 1
- By submission: 1
- By decision: 2
- Draws: 2

Other information
- Mixed martial arts record from Sherdog

Akihiko Adachi (Japanese: 安達 明彦, Adachi Akihiko) is a Japanese light heavyweight mixed martial artist. Adachi was born in Sapporo, Hokkaido, Japan. He fought as a professional mixed martial artist from Paraesta Matsudo in Matsudo, Chiba Prefecture beginning in 2000. Adachi was the top amateur Shooto light heavyweight in 2002, and was named the Shooto cruiserweight rookie of the year in 2003. Adachi's last bout was in 2006 and he formally retired from mixed martial arts in 2008.

Adachi is an accomplished judoka, having reached the rank of 4th degree black belt. He is also attained the rank of black belt in Brazilian Jiu-Jitsu in 2011. Adachi is a real estate agent, a profession he held throughout his mixed martial arts career, and continues to instruct from Paraesta Matsudo.

== Mixed martial arts record ==
Professional record breakdown
10 matches	4 wins	4 losses
By knockout	1	1
By submission	1	1
By decision	2	2
Draws	2	

Res.	Record	Opponent	Method	Event	Date	Round	Time	Location	Notes
Win	4–4–2	Nobuyasu Fujikawa	TKO (Punches)	Shooto: Gig North 2	May 25, 2008	2	1:00	Hokkaido, Japan	
Loss	3–4–2	Akihiro Murayama	Submission (Armbar)	Shooto: Shooting Disco 2: The Heat Rises Tonight	August 5, 2007	2	2:29	Tokyo, Japan	
Loss	3–3–2	Masashi Yozen	TKO (Punches)	Shooto: Back To Our Roots 3	May 18, 2007	2	1:26	Tokyo, Japan	
Draw	3–2–2	Akihiro Murayama	Draw	Shooto 2006: 10/1 in Kitazawa Town Hall	October 1, 2006	2	5:00	Tokyo, Japan	
Loss	3–2–1	Hiroki Ozaki	Decision (Unanimous)	GCM - D.O.G 2	June 11, 2005	2	5:00	Tokyo, Japan	
Draw	3–1–1	Katsuhiko Ochiai	Draw	Shooto - 11/25 in Kitazawa Town Hall	November 25, 2003	2	5:00	Tokyo, Japan	Light Heavyweight bout.
Win	3–1	Yosuke Mikami	Decision (Unanimous)	Shooto - 9/5 in Korakuen Hall	September 5, 2003	2	5:00	Tokyo, Japan	Middleweight debut.
Loss	2–1	Masaya Inoue	Decision (Unanimous)	Shooto: Gig East 9	May 28, 2002	2	5:00	Tokyo, Japan	
Win	2–0	Kassim Annan	Submission (Rear Naked Choke)	Shooto - Gig East 7	November 26, 2001	1	3:46	Tokyo, Japan	
Win	1–0	Jun Ishii	Decision (Majority)	Shooto - Gig East 4	July 27, 2001	2	5:00	Tokyo, Japan	

== See also ==
- List of male mixed martial artists
- List of current mixed martial arts champions
