= Kazumichi =

- Gender: Male

Origin
- Origin: Japanese
- Meaning: Different meanings depending on the kanji used

Kazumichi (written: 和道) is a masculine Japanese given name. Notable people with the name include:

- Kazumichi Takada, Japanese mixed martial artist
- Kazumichi Takagi (高木 和道; born 1980), Japanese footballer
