= Hiroaki Yoshioka =

Japanese mixed martial artist

- Born: January 3, 1974 (age 52); Japan
- Nationality: Japanese
- Height: 5 ft 5 in (1.65 m)
- Weight: 123 lb (56 kg; 8.8 st)
- Division: Strawweight; Flyweight; Bantamweight
- Team: Paraestra Tokyo
- Years active: 1998 - 2010

Mixed martial arts record
- Total: 18
- Wins: 6
- By knockout: 1
- By submission: 2
- By decision: 3
- Losses: 10
- By knockout: 1
- By submission: 2
- By decision: 7
- Draws: 2

Other information
- Mixed martial arts record from Sherdog

Hiroaki Yoshioka (born January 3, 1974) is a Japanese mixed martial artist. He competed in the Strawweight, Flyweight and Bantamweight divisions.

== Mixed martial arts record ==
Professional record breakdown
18 matches	6 wins	10 losses
By knockout	1	1
By submission	2	2
By decision	3	7
Draws	2	

Res.	Record	Opponent	Method	Event	Date	Round	Time	Location	Notes
Loss	6-10-2	Junji Ito	Decision (unanimous)	Shooto: Shooting Disco 11: Tora Tora Tora!	February 27, 2010	3	5:00	Tokyo, Japan	
Win	6-9-2	Hiroyuki Abe	Submission (guillotine choke)	Shooto: Kitazawa Shooto 2009 Vol. 2	September 4, 2009	2	3:08	Tokyo, Japan	
Loss	5-9-2	Takuya Mori	Decision (unanimous)	Shooto: Gig North 1	September 2, 2007	2	5:00	Sapporo, Hokkaido, Japan	
Loss	5-8-2	Junji Ikoma	Submission (rear-naked choke)	Shooto: 5/8 in Osaka Prefectural Gymnasium	May 8, 2005	3	1:36	Tokyo, Japan	
Loss	5-7-2	Mamoru Yamaguchi	KO (knee to the body)	Shooto 2004: 5/3 in Korakuen Hall	May 3, 2004	3	4:41	Tokyo, Japan	
Loss	5-6-2	Junji Ikoma	Technical Submission (rear-naked choke)	Shooto: 8/10 in Yokohama Cultural Gymnasium	August 10, 2003	2	3:26	Yokohama, Kanagawa, Japan	
Loss	5-5-2	Kimihito Nonaka	Decision (unanimous)	Shooto: Gig Central 2	October 6, 2002	3	5:00	Nagoya, Aichi, Japan	
Win	5-4-2	Ichaku Murata	Decision (unanimous)	Shooto: Treasure Hunt 9	July 27, 2002	3	5:00	Setagaya, Tokyo, Japan	
Loss	4-4-2	Mamoru Yamaguchi	Decision (unanimous)	Shooto: Wanna Shooto 2002	April 14, 2002	3	5:00	Setagaya, Tokyo, Japan	
Loss	4-3-2	Hisao Ikeda	Decision (unanimous)	Shooto: Treasure Hunt 1	January 12, 2002	3	5:00	Tokyo, Japan	
Win	4-2-2	Kentaro Imaizumi	Decision (unanimous)	Shooto: Gig East 5	August 15, 2001	3	5:00	Tokyo, Japan	
Loss	3-2-2	Jin Akimoto	Decision (unanimous)	Shooto: To The Top 3	March 21, 2001	3	5:00	Setagaya, Tokyo, Japan	
Draw	3-1-2	Takeyasu Hirono	Draw	Shooto: To The Top 1	January 19, 2001	3	5:00	Tokyo, Japan	
Win	3-1-1	Masaru Gokita	KO (head kick)	Shooto: R.E.A.D. 10	September 15, 2000	1	0:17	Tokyo, Japan	
Win	2-1-1	Shuichiro Katsumura	Submission (armbar)	Shooto: R.E.A.D. 7	July 22, 2000	2	3:43	Setagaya, Tokyo, Japan	
Win	1-1-1	Daiji Takahashi	Decision (split)	Shooto: R.E.A.D. 4	April 12, 2000	2	5:00	Setagaya, Tokyo, Japan	
Loss	0-1-1	Yoshinobu Ota	Decision (majority)	Shooto: Shooter's Soul	January 27, 1999	2	5:00	Setagaya, Tokyo, Japan	
Draw	0-0-1	Masaki Nishizawa	Draw	Shooto: Shooter's Dream	September 18, 1998	2	5:00	Setagaya, Tokyo, Japan	

== See also ==
- List of male mixed martial artists
