= Alexandre Franca Nogueira =

Brazilian mixed martial artist

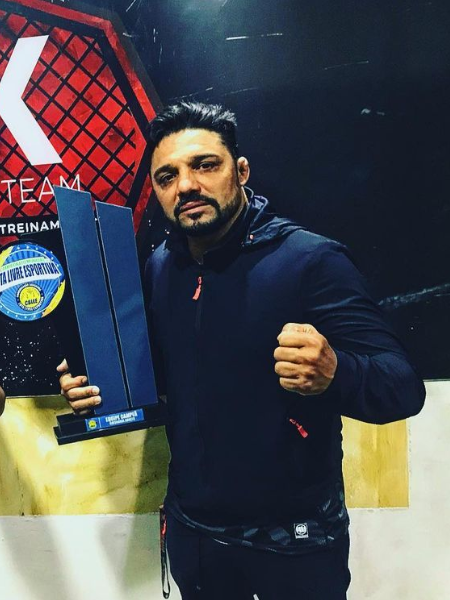
- Alexandre Pequeno
- Born: January 15, 1978 (age 48); Rio de Janeiro, Brazil
- Other names: Pequeno
- Height: 5 ft 5 in (1.65 m)
- Weight: 145 lb (66 kg; 10.4 st)
- Division: Featherweight
- Style: Luta Livre e Jiu-jitsu
- Team: Pequeno Team; Clube da Luta

Mixed martial arts record
- Total: 27
- Wins: 18
- By knockout: 2
- By submission: 12
- By decision: 4
- Losses: 7
- By knockout: 4
- By decision: 3
- Draws: 2

Other information
- Mixed martial arts record from Sherdog

Alexandre Franca "Pequeno" Nogueira (born January 15, 1978) is a Brazilian Luta Livre fighter and the former Shooto Lightweight Champion, a Japanese mixed martial arts organization. Nogueira began his professional career at the age of 20, defeating Noboru Asahi.

The California State Athletic Commission (CSA) had suspended Alexandre Nogueira, for one year and fined him $2,500, for failing a drug test at a June 1, 2008 WEC show. He tested positive for Boldenone, a banned substance.

== Championships and Accomplishment ==
- Shooto
  - Shooto Lightweight (143 lbs.) Championship
  - Six Successful Title Defenses

== Mixed martial arts record ==
Professional record breakdown
| 28 matches | 18 wins | 7 losses |
| By knockout | 2 | 4 |
| By submission | 12 | 0 |
| By decision | 4 | 3 |
| Draws | 3 | |

| Res. | Record | Opponent | Method | Event | Date | Round | Time | Location | Notes |
|---|---|---|---|---|---|---|---|---|---|
| Loss | 18–7–3 | Hatsu Hioki | Decision (unanimous) | Roots of Martial Arts Network 2 | April 27, 2025 | 1 | 15:00 | Tokyo, Japan | Lightweight bout. |
| Win | 18–6–3 | Denison Silva | Submission (heel hook) | The Hill Fighters 1 | May 1, 2014 | 2 | 0:23 | Rio Grande do Sul, Brazil | |
| Win | 17–6–3 | Antonio Barajas | Submission (guillotine choke) | Reto de Campeones MMA 2 | February 21, 2014 | 1 | 2:06 | Mexico City, Mexico | |
| Win | 16–6–3 | Marc Gomez | Decision (unanimous) | Reto de Campeones MMA 1 | February 14, 2014 | 5 | 3:00 | Mexico City, Mexico | |
| Win | 15–6–3 | D'Juan Owens | KO (head kick) | Inka FC 23 | August 24, 2013 | 4 | N/A | Lima, Peru | Won the vacant Inka FC Featherweight Championship. |
| Draw | 14–6–3 | D'Juan Owens | Draw (majority) | Inka FC 21 | May 19, 2013 | 3 | 5:00 | Lima, Peru | For the vacant Inka FC Featherweight Championship. |
| Win | 14–6–2 | Payaso Loco | Submission (punches) | Duelo de Titas 1 | March 24, 2012 | 1 | 2:15 | Mato Grosso, Brazil | |
| Loss | 13–6–2 | Takeshi Inoue | TKO (punches) | Vale Tudo Japan 2009 | October 30, 2009 | 4 | 2:58 | Tokyo, Japan | |
| Loss | 13–5–2 | José Aldo | TKO (punches) | WEC 34 | June 1, 2008 | 2 | 3:22 | Sacramento, California, United States | Return to Featherweight. Nogueira tested positive for boldenone. |
| Win | 13–4–2 | Shuichiro Katsumura | KO (punch) | Hero's 9 | July 16, 2007 | 2 | 1:55 | Yokohama, Japan | |
| Loss | 12–4–2 | Kotetsu Boku | Decision (unanimous) | Hero's 6 | August 5, 2006 | 2 | 5:00 | Tokyo, Japan | |
| Loss | 12–3–2 | Hideo Tokoro | KO (spinning backfist) | Hero's 2 | July 6, 2005 | 3 | 0:08 | Tokyo, Japan | Return to Lightweight. |
| Win | 12–2–2 | João Roque | Decision (unanimous) | G-Shooto: Special 01 | March 11, 2005 | 3 | 5:00 | Tokyo, Japan | Defended the Shooto Featherweight Championship. |
| Win | 11–2–2 | Hideki Kadowaki | Submission (guillotine choke) | Shooto: Year End Show 2004 | December 14, 2004 | 1 | 3:34 | Tokyo, Japan | Lightweight bout. |
| Win | 10–2–2 | Rumina Sato | Submission (guillotine choke) | Shooto: Year End Show 2003 | December 14, 2003 | 1 | 0:41 | Urayasu, Japan | |
| Draw | 9–2–2 | Stephen Palling | Draw (split) | Shooto: 8/10 in Yokohama Cultural Gymnasium | August 10, 2003 | 3 | 5:00 | Yokohama, Japan | Retained the Shooto Featherweight Championship. |
| Win | 9–2–1 | Hiroyuki Abe | Technical Submission (rear-naked choke) | Shooto: Year End Show 2002 | December 14, 2002 | 1 | 3:53 | Urayasu, Japan | Defended the Shooto Featherweight Championship. |
| Loss | 8–2–1 | Hiroyuki Abe | KO (punch) | Shooto: Treasure Hunt 8 | July 19, 2002 | 1 | 4:37 | Tokyo, Japan | |
| Win | 8–1–1 | Katsuya Toida | Decision (unanimous) | Shooto: To The Top 11 | December 16, 2001 | 3 | 5:00 | Urayasu, Japan | Defended the Shooto Featherweight Championship. |
| Win | 7–1–1 | Tetsuo Katsuta | Submission (guillotine choke) | Shooto: To The Top 8 | September 2, 2001 | 2 | 2:45 | Tokyo, Japan | Defended the Shooto Featherweight Championship. |
| Loss | 6–1–1 | Tetsuo Katsuta | Decision (majority) | Shooto: To The Top 4 | May 1, 2001 | 3 | 5:00 | Tokyo, Japan | |
| Win | 6–0–1 | Stephen Palling | Submission (guillotine choke) | Shooto: R.E.A.D. Final | December 17, 2000 | 2 | 1:19 | Urayasu, Japan | |
| Win | 5–0–1 | Uchu Tatsumi | Submission (guillotine choke) | Shooto: R.E.A.D. 9 | August 27, 2000 | 1 | 1:57 | Yokohama, Japan | Defended the Shooto Featherweight Championship. |
| Win | 4–0–1 | Mamoru Okochi | Decision (unanimous) | Shooto: R.E.A.D. 3 | April 2, 2000 | 3 | 5:00 | Osaka, Japan | Non-title bout. |
| Draw | 3–0–1 | Uchu Tatsumi | Draw | Vale Tudo Japan 1999 | December 11, 1999 | 3 | 8:00 | Urayasu, Japan | |
| Win | 3–0 | Noboru Asahi | Technical Submission (guillotine choke) | Shooto: Renaxis 4 | September 5, 1999 | 2 | 3:29 | Tokyo, Japan | Featherweight debut. Won the Shooto Featherweight Championship. |
| Win | 2–0 | Masahiro Oishi | Submission (armbar) | Shooto: Renaxis 1 | March 28, 1999 | 1 | 3:11 | Tokyo, Japan | |
| Win | 1–0 | Noboru Asahi | Technical Submission (guillotine choke) | Shooto: Shoot the Shooto XX | April 26, 1998 | 1 | 1:06 | Yokohama, Japan | Lightweight debut. |

== See also ==
- List of male mixed martial artists
