= 1998 in Shooto =

Mixed martial arts events

Information
- First date: January 17, 1998
- Last date: November 27, 1998

Events
- Total events: 10

Fights
- Total fights: 71
- Title fights: 1

Chronology
1997 in Shooto	1998 in Shooto	1999 in Shooto

The year 1998 is the 10th year in the history of Shooto, a mixed martial arts promotion based in Japan. In 1998 Shooto held 10 events beginning with Shooto: Las Grandes Viajes 1.

== Title fights ==
Title fights in 1998
Weight class				Method	Round	Time	Event	Notes
Middleweight	Hayato Sakurai	def.	Jutaro Nakao	Decision (Unanimous)	3	5:00	Shooto: Las Grandes Viajes 3	(Note: For The Middleweight Champion.)

== Events list ==
#	Event Title	Date	Arena	Location
57	Shooto: Las Grandes Viajes 6	November 27, 1998	Korakuen Hall	Tokyo, Japan
56	Shooto: Shooter's Dream	September 18, 1998	Kitazawa Town Hall	Setagaya, Tokyo, Japan
55	Shooto: Las Grandes Viajes 5	August 29, 1998	Korakuen Hall	Tokyo, Japan
54	Shooto: Las Grandes Viajes 4	July 29, 1998	Korakuen Hall	Tokyo, Japan
53	Shooto: Gig '98 2nd	July 18, 1998	Kitazawa Town Hall	Tokyo, Japan
52	Shooto: Las Grandes Viajes 3	May 13, 1998	Korakuen Hall	Tokyo, Japan
51	Shooto: Shoot the Shooto XX	April 26, 1998	Yokohama Arena	Yokohama, Kanagawa, Japan
50	Shooto: Gig '98 1st	April 10, 1998	Kitazawa Town Hall	Tokyo, Japan
49	Shooto: Las Grandes Viajes 2	March 1, 1998	Korakuen Hall	Tokyo, Japan
48	Shooto: Las Grandes Viajes 1	January 17, 1998	Korakuen Hall	Tokyo, Japan

== Shooto: Las Grandes Viajes 1 ==
Shooto: Las Grandes Viajes 1 was an event held on January 17, 1998, at Korakuen Hall in Tokyo, Japan.

=== Results ===
Main Card
Weight class				Method	Round	Time	Notes
	Noboru Asahi	def.	Dennis Hall	Submission (Armbar)	2	4:18
	Ricardo Botelho	def.	Masato Fujiwara	Decision (Unanimous)	3	5:00
	Jutaro Nakao	def.	Jay R. Palmer	Submission (Rear-Naked Choke)	1	3:51
	Masanori Suda	def.	Ray Cooper	Submission (Armbar)	1	1:55
	Hisao Ikeda	def.	Jin Akimoto	Decision (Unanimous)	3	5:00
	Tetsuji Kato	def.	Koichi Tanaka	Technical Submission (Armbar)	1	1:01
	Satoshi Fujisaki	vs.	Dokonjonosuke Mishima	Draw	2	5:00

== Shooto: Las Grandes Viajes 2 ==
Shooto: Las Grandes Viajes 2 was an event held on March 1, 1998, at Korakuen Hall in Tokyo, Japan.

=== Results ===
Main Card
Weight class				Method	Round	Time	Notes
	Joel Gerson	def.	Rumina Sato	Technical Submission (Armbar)	1	3:53
	Carlos Newton	def.	Kazuhiro Kusayanagi	Submission (Armbar)	1	2:17
	Masanori Suda	def.	Kenji Kawaguchi	Submission (Armbar)	3	1:08
	Hisao Ikeda	def.	Omar Salvosa	Submission (Achilles Lock)	1	4:23
	Caol Uno	def.	Yuji Fujita	Decision (Unanimous)	2	5:00
	Masahiro Oishi	def.	Yoshihiro Fujita	Technical Submission (Kimura)	1	2:40
	Takaharu Murahama	def.	Hiroyuki Kojima	KO (Punch)	1	2:31
	Takenori Ito	def.	Hiroki Kotani	Decision (Unanimous)	2	5:00

== Shooto: Gig '98 1st ==
Shooto: Gig '98 1st was an event held on April 10, 1998, at Kitazawa Town Hall in Tokyo, Japan.

=== Results ===
Main Card
Weight class				Method	Round	Time	Notes
	Takuya Kuwabara	def.	Takenori Ito	Decision (Majority)	3	5:00
	Yuki Sasaki	def.	Yasushi Warita	Submission (Heel Hook)	1	1:19
	Yoshiyuki Takayama	def.	Katsuhisa Akasaki	Submission (Rear Naked Choke)	1	3:34
	Kazumichi Takada	def.	Satoshi Fujisaki	Decision (Unanimous)	2	5:00
	Masakazu Kuramochi	def.	Mitsuo Matsumoto	Decision (Unanimous)	2	5:00
	Saburo Kawakatsu	def.	Isao Tanimura	Decision (Unanimous)	2	5:00

== Shooto: Shoot the Shooto XX ==
Shooto: Shoot the Shooto XX was an event held on April 26, 1998, at Yokohama Arena in Yokohama, Kanagawa, Japan.

=== Results ===
Main Card
Weight class				Method	Round	Time	Notes
	Rumina Sato	def.	Michael Buell	Submission (Armbar)	1	0:31
	Alexandre Franca Nogueira	def.	Noboru Asahi	Technical Submission (Guillotine Choke)	1	1:06
	Akihiro Gono	def.	Matt Rocca	Submission (Armbar)	1	3:12
	Emmanuel Yarborough	def.	Tatsuo Nakano	Submission (Smother)	1	1:17

== Shooto: Las Grandes Viajes 3 ==
Shooto: Las Grandes Viajes 3 was an event held on May 13, 1998, at Korakuen Hall in Tokyo, Japan.

=== Results ===
Main Card
Weight class				Method	Round	Time	Notes
Middleweight	Hayato Sakurai	def.	Jutaro Nakao	Decision (Unanimous)	3	5:00	(Note: For The Middleweight Champion.)
	Larry Papadopoulos	vs.	Kazuhiro Kusayanagi	Draw	3	5:00
	Frank Trigg	def.	Marcelo Aguiar	TKO (Punches)	2	3:08
	Caol Uno	def.	Ian James Schaffa	Technical Submission (Armbar)	3	3:13
	Koichi Tanaka	vs.	Masato Fujiwara	Draw	2	5:00
	Masakazu Kuramochi	def.	Takaharu Murahama	Decision (Majority)	2	5:00
	Kazumichi Takada	def.	Hiroki Kotani	Decision (Majority)	2	5:00

== Shooto: Gig '98 2nd ==
Shooto: Gig '98 2nd was an event held on July 18, 1998, at Kitazawa Town Hall in Tokyo, Japan.

=== Results ===
Main Card
Weight class				Method	Round	Time	Notes
	Hisao Ikeda	def.	Mamoru Okochi	Decision (Unanimous)	3	5:00
	Masahiro Oishi	def.	Kimihito Nonaka	Submission (Armbar)	2	1:18
	Yoshiyuki Takayama	def.	Yoshihiro Fujita	Decision (Majority)	2	5:00
	Hiroyuki Kojima	def.	Isao Tanimura	Technical Submission (Kimura)	1	4:37
	Takaharu Murahama	vs.	Hiroshi Tsuruya	Draw	2	5:00
	Yuki Sasaki	def.	Izuru Takeuchi	Decision (Unanimous)	2	5:00

== Shooto: Las Grandes Viajes 4 ==
Shooto: Las Grandes Viajes 4 was an event held on July 29, 1998, at Korakuen Hall in Tokyo, Japan.

=== Results ===
Main Card
Weight class				Method	Round	Time	Notes
	Hayato Sakurai	def.	Ronny Rivano	Submission (Rear Naked Choke)	1	1:10
	Kenji Kawaguchi	def.	Ante Jurisic	Submission (Heel Hook)	2	0:35
	Caol Uno	def.	Zvonko Jakovcevic	Submission (Triangle Choke)	1	3:15
	Takuya Kuwabara	def.	Damien Riccio	Decision (Unanimous)	3	5:00
	Mitsuhiro Sakamoto	vs.	Takeyasu Hirono	Draw	2	5:00
	Anthony Netzler	def.	Jun Kitagawa	Submission (Toe Hold)	1	1:14

== Shooto: Las Grandes Viajes 5 ==
Shooto: Las Grandes Viajes 5 was an event held on August 29, 1998, at Korakuen Hall in Tokyo, Japan.

=== Results ===
Main Card
Weight class				Method	Round	Time	Notes
	Erik Paulson	def.	Masanori Suda	TKO (Punches)	3	4:48
	Noboru Asahi	def.	Trent Bekis	Submission (Kimura)	1	3:01
	Ricardo Botelho	def.	Joel Gerson	Decision (Split)	3	5:00
	Tetsuji Kato	def.	Alex Cook	Decision (Unanimous)	3	5:00
	Takenori Ito	vs.	Kazumichi Takada	Draw	2	5:00
	Jin Akimoto	def.	Masaru Gokita	Decision (Majority)	2	5:00
	Hiroyuki Kojima	def.	Saburo Kawakatsu	Decision (Unanimous)	2	5:00

== Shooto: Shooter's Dream ==
Shooto: Shooter's Dream was an event held on September 18, 1998, at Kitazawa Town Hall in Setagaya, Tokyo, Japan.

=== Results ===
Main Card
Weight class				Method	Round	Time	Notes
	Jutaro Nakao	def.	Koichi Tanaka	Submission (Triangle Choke)	1	3:56
	Mamoru Okochi	vs.	Yoshiyuki Takayama	Draw	2	5:00
	Satoshi Fujisaki	def.	Kyuhei Ueno	Submission (Armbar)	1	2:23
	Yuki Sasaki	def.	Nobuhiro Tsurumaki	Decision (Unanimous)	2	5:00
	Naoya Uematsu	def.	Katsuya Toida	Submission (Armbar)	1	2:46
	Ryuta Sakurai	def.	Masashi Kita	TKO (Punches)	1	3:00
	Masaki Nishizawa	vs.	Hiroaki Yoshioka	Draw	2	5:00
	Takayuki Okochi	def.	Hiromichi Maruyama	Decision (Majority)	2	5:00

== Shooto: Las Grandes Viajes 6 ==
Shooto: Las Grandes Viajes 6 was an event held on November 27, 1998, at Korakuen Hall in Tokyo, Japan.

=== Results ===
Main Card
Weight class				Method	Round	Time	Notes
	Uchu Tatsumi	def.	Eric Payne	Submission (Rear Naked Choke)	1	2:42
	Akihiro Gono	def.	Adriano de Souza	Submission (Armbar)	1	2:46
	Hisao Ikeda	def.	Colin Mannsur	TKO (Punches)	2	1:49
	Paul Jones	def.	Sanae Kikuta	Decision (Unanimous)	3	5:00
	Tetsuji Kato	def.	Hiroyuki Kojima	TKO (Punches)	2	4:28
	Takenori Ito	vs.	Masato Fujiwara	Draw	3	5:00
	Yuki Sasaki	def.	Kazuhiro Kusayanagi	TKO (Punches)	1	0:46
	Naoya Uematsu	vs.	Kimihito Nonaka	Draw	2	5:00
	Ryuta Sakurai	vs.	Izuru Takeuchi	Draw	2	5:00
	Takanori Gomi	def.	Hiroshi Tsuruya	Decision (Unanimous)	2	5:00
	Takaharu Murahama	vs.	Saburo Kawakatsu	Draw
	Masaru Gokita	def.	Masaki Nishizawa	Decision (Unanimous)	2	5:00

== See also ==
- Shooto
- List of Shooto champions
- List of Shooto Events
