= Mamoru Yamaguchi =

Japanese martial artist (born 1977)

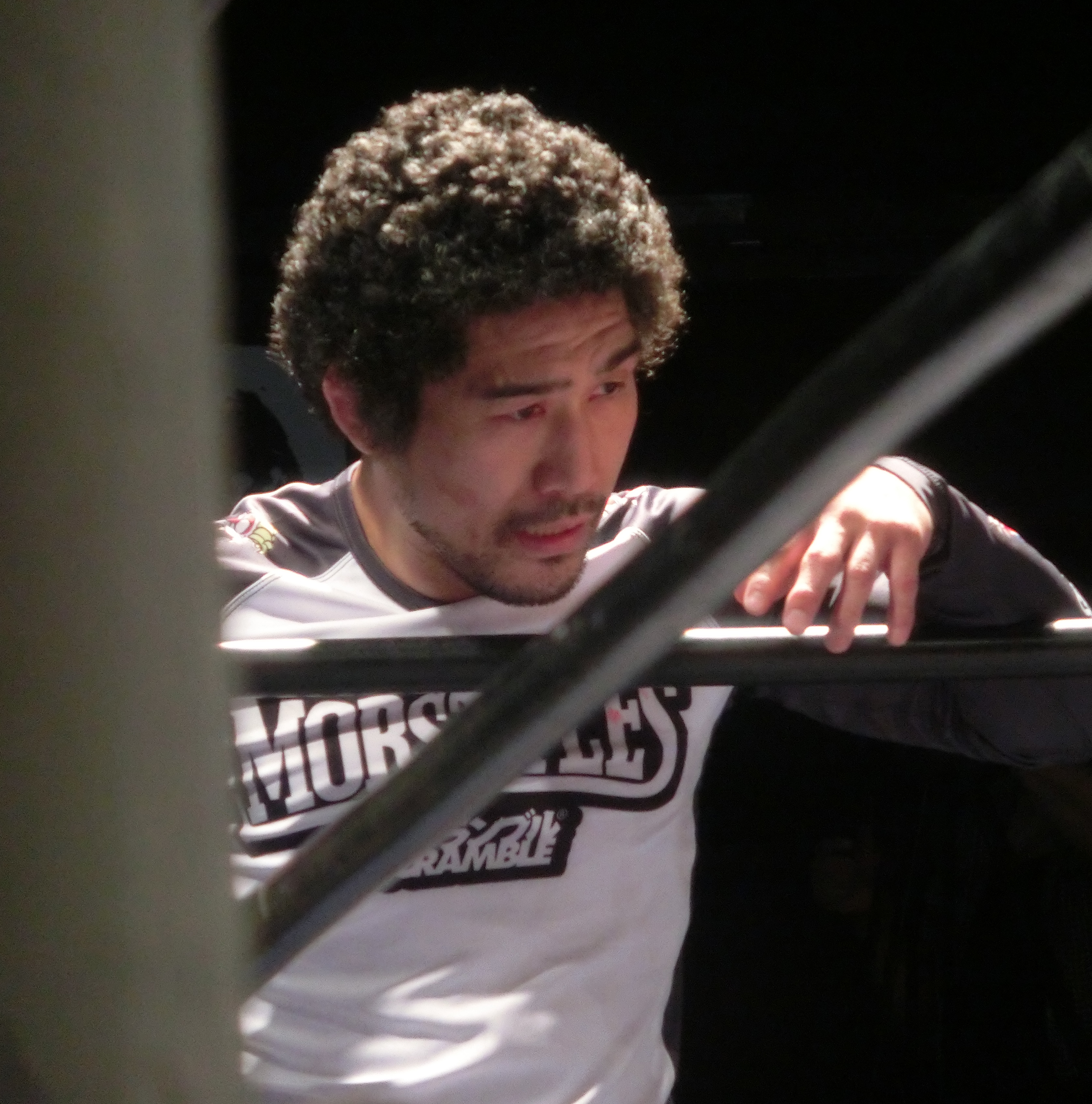
- Born: May 29, 1977 (age 49); Yokohama, Kanagawa, Japan
- Native name: 山口守
- Nationality: Japanese
- Height: 5 ft 4 in (1.63 m)
- Weight: 123 lb (56 kg; 8 st 11 lb)
- Division: Bantamweight (1999-2002); Flyweight (2002-2019)
- Style: Muay Thai, Judo
- Fighting out of: Kawasaki, Kanagawa, Japan
- Team: Shooting Gym Yokohama
- Years active: 1999–present

Kickboxing record
- Total: 5
- Wins: 4
- Losses: 1

Mixed martial arts record
- Total: 49
- Wins: 31
- By knockout: 11
- By submission: 4
- By decision: 16
- Losses: 13
- By knockout: 1
- By submission: 4
- By decision: 8
- Draws: 5

Other information
- Mixed martial arts record from Sherdog

Mamoru Yamaguchi (born May 29, 1977) is a Japanese mixed martial artist who competes in Pancrase. He is the former Shooto Bantamweight (123 lb) Champion, former Shooto Featherweight (132 lb) Champion, former Pancrase Flyweight Champion, as well as a former King of the Cage Junior Flyweight Champion. Mamoru is known for his counter striking and his trilogy with the former Shooto Bantamweight Champion Shinichi Kojima.

He has been consistently ranked as one of the top flyweight in the world by Sherdog's Official Mixed Martial Arts Rankings. He is considered, by Fight Matrix, to be the third best flyweight in the history of mixed martial arts.

His afro is a tribute to Japanese boxing legend, Yoko Gushiken.

== Martial arts career ==
Yamaguchi made his professional debut in 1999 during Shooto - Renaxis 2, against Shuichiro Katsumura.

After making his debut, Yamaguchi went on a five fight unbeaten streak. He earned a decision win over Jin Akimoto, a submission win over Ryan Diaz, a TKO win over Baret Yoshida, a draw against Masaru Gokita and a knee KO win over Yoshinobu Ota. These victories entitled win a fight for the inaugural Shooto Featherweight (132 lb) Championship, in a rematch against Jin Akimoto. Yamaguchi won a unanimous decision.

After defeating Gildo Lima by an armbar, Yamaguchi was to defend his title against Masahiro Oishi. He lost through a triangle armbar.

Yamaguchi would drop down to bantamweight and accumulate a 2-1 record. He was given a chance to win the inaugural Shooto Bantamweight (123 lb) Championship, when he faced Yasuhiro Urushitani. He won a unanimous decision, winning a Shooto title in two different weight classes. This was the first fight where he wore his iconic afro.

He beat Hiroaki Yoshioka in a rematch with a knee to the body, and defended his bantamweight title in a rematch against Robson Moura. He went on a four fight winning streak, most notably beating Junji Ikoma, before defending the bantamweight title for the second time against Shinichi Kojima. This would be the beginning of their rivalry.

Afterwards he TKO'd Setsu Iguchi and Erikas Suslovas, before rematching Shinichi Kojima. He lost in by way of rear naked choke in the first round. Achieving three wins in his next four fights, he fought Shinichi Kojima for the third time. He lost by way of guillotine choke.

Moving to King of the Cage he won the junior flyweight title by defeating Frank Baca with a rear naked choke. He fought Greg Guzman next, but the fight wasn't a title defense, as his opponent missed weight.

Returning to Japan, he fought mainly in Vale Tudo Japan. He won three fights, most notably against Yosuke Saruta, lost four and drew twice. He found greater success in Pancrase winning three of his next four fights. Interestingly, all four fights were split decisions. He was then scheduled to fight Ryuichi Miki during Pancrase: 285. He won through a split decision, winning his fourth major career title.

He lost the title after dropping a unanimous decision to Senzo Ikeda. He fought once in 2018, losing by way of TKO to Yuya Wakamatsu, and once in 2019, losing a unanimous decision to Toru Ogawa.

== Championships and Accomplishments ==
- Shooto
  - Shooto Bantamweight (123 lb) Championship (One time)
    - Two successful title defenses
  - Shooto Featherweight (132 lb) Championship (One time)
- King of the Cage
  - King of the Cage Junior Flyweight Championship (One time)
- Pancrase
  - Pancrase Flyweight Championship (One time)
- Fight Matrix
  - 1999 Rookie of the Year

== Mixed martial arts record ==
Professional record breakdown
49 matches	31 wins	13 losses
By knockout	11	1
By submission	4	4
By decision	16	8
Draws	5	

Res.	Record	Opponent	Method	Event	Date	Round	Time	Location	Notes
Loss	31–13–5	Toru Ogawa	Decision (unanimous)	Pancrase: 305	May 26, 2019	3	5:00	Tokyo, Japan	
Loss	31–12–5	Yuya Wakamatsu	TKO (punches)	Pancrase: 297	July 1, 2018	2	0:39	Tokyo, Japan	
Loss	31–11–5	Senzo Ikeda	Decision (unanimous)	Pancrase: 289	August 20, 2017	5	5:00	Tokyo, Japan	Lost the Pancrase Flyweight Championship.
Win	31–10–5	Ryuichi Miki	Decision (split)	Pancrase: 285	March 12, 2017	5	5:00	Tokyo, Japan	Won the Pancrase Flyweight Championship.
Win	30–10–5	Luis Nogueira	Decision (split)	Pancrase: 281	October 2, 2016	3	5:00	Tokyo, Japan	
Win	29–10–5	Senzo Ikeda	Decision (split)	Pancrase: 277	April 24, 2016	3	5:00	Tokyo, Japan	
Loss	28–10–5	Yuki Yasunaga	Decision (split)	Pancrase: 273	December 13, 2015	3	5:00	Tokyo, Japan	
Win	28–9–5	Yusuke Kitago	Decision (split)	Pancrase: 269	August 9, 2015	3	5:00	Tokyo, Japan	
Draw	27–9–5	Kosuke Suzuki	Draw (split)	Shooto: Mobstyles 15th Anniversary Tour Fight & Mosh	May 3, 2015	3	5:00	Tokyo, Japan	
Win	27–9–4	Yosuke Saruta	TKO (doctor stoppage)	Vale Tudo Japan: VTJ 6th	October 4, 2014	2	0:25	Ota, Tokyo, Japan	
Loss	26–9–4	Czar Sklavos	Submission (rear-naked choke)	Vale Tudo Japan: VTJ 4th	February 23, 2014	1	1:28	Tokyo, Japan	
Draw	26–8–4	Yoshiro Maeda	Draw (majority)	Deep: Tribe Tokyo Fight	October 20, 2013	3	5:00	Tokyo, Japan	
Loss	26–8–3	Mikihito Yamagami	Decision (majority)	Vale Tudo Japan: VTJ 2nd	June 22, 2013	3	5:00	Tokyo, Japan	
Loss	26–7–3	Darrell Montague	Decision (split)	Vale Tudo Japan: VTJ 1st	December 24, 2012	3	5:00	Tokyo, Japan	
Loss	26–6–3	Jussier da Silva	Decision (unanimous)	Tachi Palace Fights 10	August 6, 2011	3	5:00	Lemoore, California, United States	
Win	26–5–3	Kevin Dunsmoor	KO (punch)	TPF 9: The Contenders	May 5, 2011	2	4:03	Lemoore, California, United States	
Win	25–5–3	Fumihiro Kitahara	KO (head kick)	Shooto: The Way of Shooto 6: Like a Tiger, Like a Dragon	November 19, 2010	1	2:33	Tokyo, Japan	
Win	24–5–3	Greg Guzman	TKO (elbows)	KOTC: Sniper	August 5, 2010	2	2:21	San Bernardino, California, United States	Non-title bout; Guzman failed to make weight.
Win	23–5–3	Frank Baca	Submission (rear-naked choke)	KOTC: Toryumon	January 30, 2010	2	1:54	Okinawa, Japan	Won the inaugural KOTC Light Flyweight Championship.
Win	22–5–3	Kiyotaka Shimizu	Decision (majority)	Shooto: Revolutionary Exchanges 3	November 23, 2009	3	5:00	Tokyo, Japan	
Win	21–5–3	Jesse Taitano	TKO (punches)	Vale Tudo Japan 2009	October 30, 2009	1	4:41	Tokyo, Japan	
Loss	20–5–3	Shinichi Kojima	Submission (guillotine choke)	Shooto: Shooto Tradition 2	July 18, 2008	3	3:42	Tokyo, Japan	For Shooto Bantamweight (123 lb) Championship
Win	20–4–3	Masaaki Sugawara	Decision (unanimous)	Shooto: Back To Our Roots 8	March 28, 2008	3	5:00	Tokyo, Japan	
Win	19–4–3	Yuki Shoujou	Decision (unanimous)	Shooto: Shooting Disco 4: Born in the Fighting	Feb 23, 2008	3	5:00	Tokyo, Japan	
Loss	18–4–3	Yasuhiro Urushitani	Decision (unanimous)	Shooto: Back To Our Roots 5	September 22, 2007	3	5:00	Tokyo, Japan	
Win	18–3–3	Yusei Shimokawa	Decision (unanimous)	Shooto: Shooting Disco 1: Saturday Night Hero	June 2, 2007	3	5:00	Tokyo, Japan	
Loss	17–3–3	Shinichi Kojima	Technical submission (rear naked choke)	Shooto: Champion Carnival	October 14, 2006	1	1:38	Tokyo, Japan	Lost Shooto Bantamweight (123 lb) Championship
Win	17–2–3	Erikas Suslovas	TKO (punches)	Shooto 2006: 9/8 in Korakuen Hall	September 8, 2006	1	2:14	Tokyo, Japan	
Win	16–2–3	Setsu Iguchi	TKO (cut)	Shooto: The Devilock	May 12, 2006	1	2:45	Tokyo, Japan	
Draw	15–2–3	Shinichi Kojima	Draw	Shooto: 3/24 in Korakuen Hall	March 24, 2006	3	5:00	Tokyo, Japan	Defended Shooto Bantamweight (123 lb) Championship
Win	15–2–2	Daiji Takahashi	Decision (unanimous)	Shooto: 12/17 in Shinjuku Face	Dec 17, 2005	3	5:00	Tokyo, Japan	
Win	14–2–2	Pat Seidel	Submission (rear naked choke)	Shooto: 9/23 in Korakuen Hall	September 23, 2005	2	1:35	Tokyo, Japan	
Win	13–2–2	Stonnie Dennis	KO (kick)	Shooto: 5/4 in Korakuen Hall	May 4, 2005	1	1:36	Tokyo, Japan	
Win	12–2–2	Junji Ikoma	Decision (unanimous)	Shooto: 1/29 in Korakuen Hall	Jan 29, 2005	3	5:00	Tokyo, Japan	
Draw	11–2–2	Robson Moura	Draw	Shooto: 9/26 in Kourakuen Hall	September 26, 2004	3	5:00	Tokyo, Japan	Defended Shooto Bantamweight (123 lb) Championship
Win	11–2–1	Hiroaki Yoshioka	KO (knee to the body)	Shooto 2004: 5/3 in Korakuen Hall	May 3, 2004	3	4:41	Tokyo, Japan	
Win	10–2–1	Yasuhiro Urushitani	Decision (unanimous)	Shooto: Year End Show 2003	December 14, 2003	3	5:00	Tokyo, Japan	Won Shooto Bantamweight (123 lb) Championship
Win	9–2–1	Homare Kuboyama	Decision (unanimous)	Shooto: 3/18 in Korakuen Hall	March 18, 2003	3	5:00	Tokyo, Japan	
Loss	8–2–1	Robson Moura	Decision (unanimous)	Shooto: Treasure Hunt 10	September 16, 2002	3	5:00	Tokyo, Japan	
Win	8–1–1	Hiroaki Yoshioka	Decision (unanimous)	Shooto: Wanna Shooto 2002	April 14, 2002	3	5:00	Tokyo, Japan	Flyweight debut
Loss	7–1–1	Masahiro Oishi	Submission (triangle/armbar)	Shooto: To The Top 10	November 25, 2001	1	1:44	Tokyo, Japan	Lost Shooto Featherweight (132 lb) Championship
Win	7–0–1	Gildo Lima	Submission (armbar)	Shooto: To The Top 2	March 2, 2001	1	3:57	Tokyo, Japan	
Win	6–0–1	Jin Akimoto	Decision (unanimous)	Shooto: R.E.A.D. Final	Dec 17, 2000	3	5:00	Tokyo, Japan	Won Shooto Featherweight (132 lb) Championship
Win	5–0–1	Yoshinobu Ota	KO (knee)	Shooto: R.E.A.D. 9	August 27, 2000	3	2:21	Tokyo, Japan	
Draw	4–0–1	Masaru Gokita	Draw	Shooto: R.E.A.D. 2	March 17, 2000	2	5:00	Tokyo, Japan	
Win	4–0	Baret Yoshida	TKO (punches)	Superbrawl 15	Dec 7, 1999	3	1:18	Honolulu, Hawaii, United States	
Win	3–0	Ryan Diaz	Submission (armbar)	Shooto: Gateway to the Extremes	November 4, 1999	2	3:35	Tokyo, Japan	
Win	2–0	Jin Akimoto	Decision (majority)	Shooto: Renaxis 4	September 5, 1999	2	5:00	Tokyo, Japan	
Win	1–0	Shuichiro Katsumura	Decision (unanimous)	Shooto: Renaxis 2	July 16, 1999	2	5:00	Tokyo, Japan	

== Kickboxing record ==
Kickboxing record
4 wins, 1 loss
Date	Result	Opponent	Event	Location	Method	Round	Time	Record
2012-02-05	Win	(Japan) Kazuyuki Fushimi	Shootboxing 2012 - Act 1	Tokyo, Japan	Decision (majority)	3	3:00	4-1
2009-09-04	Win	(Japan) Masahiro Fujimoto	Shootboxing - Bushido Road 4	Tokyo, Japan	Decision (unanimous)	3	3:00	3-1
2009-05-01	Win	(Thailand) Naguranchan Masa M16	Shootboxing - Bushido Road 3	Tokyo, Japan	Decision (unanimous)	3	3:00	2-1
2009-04-03	Loss	(Japan) Akito Sakimura	Shootboxing - Bushido Road	Tokyo, Japan	Decision (unanimous)	3	3:00	1-1
2009-02-11	Win	(Japan) Noriyuki Enari	Shootboxing 2009 - Act 1	Tokyo, Japan	Decision (unanimous)	3	3:00	1-0
Legend: Win Loss Draw/No contest Notes
