= João Roque =

Angolan mixed martial arts fighter

- Born: João Manuel Roque; July 22, 1971 (age 55); Luanda, Portuguese Angola
- Nationality: Angolan
- Height: 5 ft 6 in (1.68 m)
- Weight: 145 lb (66 kg; 10.4 st)
- Division: Featherweight
- Fighting out of: Luanda, Angola
- Team: Nova União; Clube Vizinhança
- Rank: Black belt in Brazilian jiu-jitsu under André Pederneiras
- Years active: 1996–2005 (MMA)

Mixed martial arts record
- Total: 13
- Wins: 7
- By submission: 5
- By decision: 2
- Losses: 2
- By decision: 2
- Draws: 4

Other information
- Mixed martial arts record from Sherdog

João Roque
Medal record

Representing Brazil

Brazilian Jiu-Jitsu

Brazilian National Championship
Gold medal – first place	1993	-76kg

Pan-American Championship
Gold medal – first place	1996	-76kg

Representing Angola

World Jiu-Jitsu Championship
Gold medal – first place	1997 Rio de Janeiro, Brazil	-64kg
Bronze medal – third place	1998 Rio de Janeiro, Brazil	-64kg

João Manuel Roque (born July 22, 1971) is a Portuguese-Angolan former featherweight Brazilian Jiu Jitsu (BJJ) black belt World Champion and a retired mixed martial artist. He competed in the Featherweight division in MMA (Mixed Martial Arts).

His first coaches of BJJ were Marcio Pinheiro and Gerson Velasco, and he stayed under their guidance until he was a purple belt. It was under prestigious Osvaldo Alves, a Brazilian Jiu Jitsu Red Belt and a legend in the sport of BJJ, that Joao Roque graduated to brown belt. When Master Oswaldo had to move to Manaus Roque joined André Pederneiras, right at the start of the Nova União.

Joao Roque began his MMA career in 1996 in the United States (Oklahoma) with a win by armbar. He retired in 2005 in the Japan (Tokyo) with a loss by decision.

Today he lives in Brasília, capital of Brazil. Roque went on to form one of the strongest teams in that state and his gym "Clube Vizinhança" still runs today.

== BJJ lineage ==
Mitsuyo Maeda > Carlos Gracie > Carlson Gracie > André Pederneiras > Joao Roque

== Notable BJJ black belts graduated ==
- Bernado Pitel
- Jonatas Gurgel "Tagarela"
- Mark Andrew Bocek

== Mixed martial arts record ==
Professional record breakdown
13 matches	7 wins	2 losses
By submission	5	0
By decision	2	2
Draws	4	

Res.	Record	Opponent	Method	Event	Date	Round	Time	Location	Notes
Loss	7–2–4	Alexandre Franca Nogueira	Decision (unanimous)	G-Shooto: Special 01	March 11, 2005	3	5:00	Tokyo Korakuen Hall	
Draw	7–1–4	Hiroyuki Takaya	Draw	Shooto 2004: 1/24 in Korakuen Hall	January 24, 2004	3	5:00	Tokyo, Japan	
Win	7–1–3	Hiroyuki Abe	Submission (armbar)	Shooto: Gig Central 4	September 21, 2003	2	4:59	Nagoya, Japan	
Win	6–1–3	Naoya Uematsu	Decision (unanimous)	Shooto: 1/24 in Korakuen Hall	January 24, 2003	3	5:00	Tokyo, Japan	
Win	5–1–3	Ryan Bow	Decision (majority)	Deep: 6th Impact	September 7, 2002	3	5:00	Tokyo, Japan	
Win	4–1–3	Takehiro Murahama	Submission (armbar)	Deep: 4th Impact	March 30, 2002	1	2:13	Nagoya, Japan	
Win	3–1–3	Stephen Palling	Submission (armbar)	World Fighting Alliance 1	November 3, 2001	1	1:29	Nevada, United States	
Win	2–1–3	Takehiro Murahama	Submission (armbar)	Deep: 2nd Impact	August 18, 2001	1	4:29	Yokohama, Japan	
Loss	1–1–3	Jens Pulver	Decision	UFC 26	June 9, 2000	3	5:00	Iowa, United States	
Draw	1–0–3	Hisao Ikeda	Draw	VTJ 1999: Vale Tudo Japan 1999	December 11, 1999	3	8:00	Tokyo, Japan	
Draw	1–0–2	Noboru Asahi	Draw	VTJ 1998: Vale Tudo Japan 1998	October 25, 1998	3	8:00	Tokyo, Japan	
Draw	1–0–1	Uchu Tatsumi	Draw	VTJ 1997: Vale Tudo Japan 1997	November 29, 1997	3	8:00	Tokyo, Japan	
Win	1–0	Abdelaziz Cherigui	Submission (armbar)	EF 3: Extreme Fighting 3	October 18, 1996	1	4:02	Oklahoma, United States	

== Submission grappling record ==
KO PUNCHES

Result	Opponent	Method	Event	Date	Round	Time	Notes
Win	(United States) Dennis Hall	Decision	The Contenders	1997	5	5:00	
