= Baret Yoshida =

American mixed martial arts fighter

- Born: April 26, 1975 (age 51); United States
- Other names: The Finisher
- Height: 5 ft 6 in (1.68 m)
- Weight: 141 lb (64 kg; 10.1 st)
- Division: Bantamweight; Featherweight
- Team: Grappling Unlimited; The Arena MMA
- Rank: 4th Degree Black Belt in Brazilian Jiu-Jitsu
- Years active: 1999 - 2010

Mixed martial arts record
- Total: 13
- Wins: 6
- By submission: 5
- By decision: 1
- Losses: 6
- By knockout: 4
- By decision: 2
- Draws: 1

Other information
- Mixed martial arts record from Sherdog

Baret Yoshida (born April 26, 1975) is an American mixed martial artist. He competed in the bantamweight and featherweight divisions.

== Biography ==
Yoshida was born in Hawaii. He started training Jiu Jitsu in 1994 at Relson Gracie’s academy. In 1999, Yoshida switched to the Inoue brother’s gym, led by Egan and Enson Inoue.

In 2002, Egan Inoue awarded Yoshida his black belt in Brazilian jiu-jitsu.

In 2022, Yoshida was inducted into the ADCC Hall of Fame as part of the inaugural class.

== Professional grappling career ==
Yoshida gained recognition with his participation in the 2001 ADCC Submission Wrestling World Championship (Abu Dhabi Combat Club) where he made it to the finals, though he lost.

On August 6, 2021, Yoshida submitted Jeff Nolasco with a crucifix choke at Fight 2 Win 180.

He returned then at Fight 2 Win 183 on September 10, 2021, to challenge for the gi featherweight title. He submitted Bernardo Pitel with an anaconda choke and won the belt.

Yoshida was then set to defend that title at Fight 2 Win's sister-promotion, Subversiv 6 on October 16, 2021. He defeated Takahito Yoshioka by decision and retained his title.

On January 7, 2023, Yoshida submitted Garry Nakamura in the main event of Fight 2 Win 216.

Yoshida competed against Kim Terra in the main event of Fight 2 Win 244, winning the match by decision.

On March 30, 2024, Yoshida became the first member of the ADCC Hall of Fame to compete at ADCC Trials, when he went 1-1 in the 66 kg division of the North American East Coast Trials.

Yoshida then competed against Rick Marshall in the main event of Fight 2 Win 255 on July 12, 2024, winning the match by decision.

Yoshida submitted AJ Mendoza at Submission Battleground 2 on February 1, 2025.

Yoshida currently coaches at the Training Center in San Diego, CA with former UFC fighter Chris Leben.

== Mixed martial arts record ==
Professional record breakdown
13 matches	6 wins	6 losses
By knockout	0	4
By submission	5	0
By decision	1	2
Draws	1	

Res.	Record	Opponent	Method	Event	Date	Round	Time	Location	Notes
Win	6-6-1	Jamie Shaffer	Submission (Rear-Naked Choke)	NFC: Native Fighting Championship 5	May 29, 2010	1	1:52	Campo, California, United States	
Loss	5-6-1	Hatsu Hioki	TKO (Punches)	Shooto: Back To Our Roots 8	March 28, 2008	1	4:51	Tokyo, Japan	
Loss	5-5-1	Yoshiro Maeda	KO (Punches)	Pancrase: Hybrid 10	November 30, 2003	1	1:29	Tokyo, Japan	
Loss	5-4-1	Jeff Curran	KO (Punch)	UCC Hawaii: Eruption in Hawaii	September 17, 2002	2	2:08	Honolulu, Hawaii, United States	
Win	5-3-1	Jason Bress	Submission (Rear Naked Choke)	SB 25: SuperBrawl 25	July 13, 2002	1	3:16	Honolulu, Hawaii, United States	
Draw	4-3-1	Hiroyuki Abe	Draw	Shooto: Treasure Hunt 5	March 15, 2002	3	5:00	Tokyo, Japan	
Win	4-3	Caleb Mitchell	Technical Submission (Guillotine Choke)	Shogun 1: Shogun 1	December 15, 2001	1	1:53	Honolulu, Hawaii, United States	
Loss	3-3	Katsuya Toida	Decision (Majority)	Shooto: To The Top 6	July 6, 2001	3	5:00	Tokyo, Japan	
Loss	3-2	Tetsuo Katsuta	Decision (Unanimous)	Shooto: To The Top 1	January 19, 2001	3	5:00	Tokyo, Japan	
Win	3-1	Mamoru Okochi	Decision (Majority)	Shooto: R.E.A.D. 10	September 15, 2000	3	5:00	Tokyo, Japan	
Win	2-1	Masahiro Oishi	Submission (Rear Naked Choke)	Shooto: R.E.A.D. 5	May 22, 2000	2	1:48	Tokyo, Japan	
Loss	1-1	Mamoru Yamaguchi	TKO (Punches)	SB 15: SuperBrawl 15	December 7, 1999	3	1:18	Honolulu, Hawaii, United States	
Win	1-0	Ryan Cabrera	Submission (Rear Naked Choke)	SB 14: SuperBrawl 14	November 5, 1999	1	1:50	Guam	

== See also ==
- List of male mixed martial artists
