= Uchu Tatsumi =

Japanese mixed martial arts fighter

- Born: January 23, 1972 (age 54); Japan
- Nationality: Japanese
- Height: 5 ft 7 in (1.70 m)
- Weight: 143 lb (65 kg; 10.2 st)
- Division: Bantamweight; Featherweight
- Style: Shorinji Kempo
- Team: K'z Factory
- Years active: 1995 - 2000

Mixed martial arts record
- Total: 14
- Wins: 10
- By knockout: 1
- By submission: 5
- By decision: 4
- Losses: 1
- By submission: 1
- Draws: 3

Other information
- Mixed martial arts record from Sherdog

Uchu Tatsumi (born January 23, 1972) is a retired Japanese mixed martial artist. He competed in the Bantamweight and Featherweight division. Tatsumi fought in Shooto and is known for his series of fights against Alexandre Franca Nogueira, from whom he suffered his only defeat ending his five year undefeated streak.

== Mixed martial arts career ==
Uchu Tatsumi trained for Shooto under Kazuhiro Kusayanagi at K'z Factory.

Tatsumi debuted on May 12, 1995, winning a unanimous decision against Magnum Kawamura at Shooto: Vale Tudo Access 4. Throughout 1996, Tatsumi fought Kimihito Nonaka and Hisao Ikeda to bring his record to 3-0-1. His undefeated streak would continue throughout the following year, including a decision win over Mamoru Okochi at Shooto: Reconquista 1 on January 18, 1997.

At 7-0, Tatsumi faced Joao Roque at the 1997 edition of Vale Tudo Japan, the fight went to a draw. On March 28, 1999, at Shooto: Renaxis 1, Tatsumi fought Noboru Asahi to a three round draw, keeping his streak alive.

At VTJ 1999, Tatsumi faced Alexandre Franca Nogueira for the Shooto Lightweight Championship the fight ended in a draw. He defeated Anthony Hamlett via rear naked choke at Shooto: R.E.A.D. 7 and then challenged Nogueira afterwards, promising that he would quit if he lost.

At the turn of the century and record standing 10-0-3, his rematch with Nogueira was soon granted. At Shooto: R.E.A.D. 9 on August 27, 2000, Tatsumi suffered his first defeat via rear naked choke in the first round. He retired as he had promised.

Tatsumi briefly broke his retirement and had a kickboxing match in 2016 at the age of 44 and retired after suffering a defeat.

== Personal life ==
Tatsumi is a graduate of the University of Tokyo. In 2014, Tatsumi was diagnosed with bipolar disorder, he was hospitalized for two months in a manic state.

== Mixed martial arts record ==
Professional record breakdown
| 14 matches | 10 wins | 1 loss |
| By knockout | 1 | 0 |
| By submission | 5 | 1 |
| By decision | 4 | 0 |
| Draws | 3 | |

| Res. | Record | Opponent | Method | Event | Date | Round | Time | Location | Notes |
|---|---|---|---|---|---|---|---|---|---|
| Loss | 10–1–3 | Alexandre Franca Nogueira | Submission (guillotine choke) | Shooto: R.E.A.D. 9 | August 27, 2000 | 1 | 1:57 | Yokohama, Kanagawa, Japan | |
| Win | 10–0–3 | Anthony Hamlett | Submission (rear-naked choke) | Shooto: R.E.A.D. 7 | July 22, 2000 | 1 | 2:49 | Setagaya, Tokyo, Japan | |
| Draw | 9–0–3 | Alexandre Franca Nogueira | Draw | VTJ 1999: Vale Tudo Japan 1999 | December 11, 1999 | 3 | 8:00 | Urayasu, Chiba, Japan | |
| Win | 9–0–2 | Hisao Ikeda | Decision (split) | Shooto: Renaxis 4 | September 5, 1999 | 3 | 5:00 | Tokyo, Japan | |
| Draw | 8–0–2 | Noboru Asahi | Draw | Shooto: Renaxis 1 | March 28, 1999 | 3 | 5:00 | Tokyo, Japan | |
| Win | 8–0–1 | Eric Payne | Submission (rear-naked choke) | Shooto: Las Grandes Viajes 6 | November 27, 1998 | 1 | 2:42 | Tokyo, Japan | |
| Draw | 7–0–1 | Joao Roque | Draw | VTJ 1997: Vale Tudo Japan 1997 | November 29, 1997 | 3 | 8:00 | Urayasu, Chiba, Japan | |
| Win | 7–0 | Paul Coonin | Submission (heel hook) | Shooto: Reconquista 4 | October 12, 1997 | 1 | 1:19 | Tokyo, Japan | |
| Win | 6–0 | Abdelaziz Cherigui | Submission (punches) | Shooto: Reconquista 2 | April 6, 1997 | 1 | 2:18 | Tokyo, Japan | |
| Win | 5–0 | Mamoru Okochi | Decision (unanimous) | Shooto: Reconquista 1 | January 18, 1997 | 5 | 3:00 | Tokyo, Japan | |
| Win | 4–0 | Sunay Ahmed | Submission (rear-naked choke) | Shooto: Let's Get Lost | October 4, 1996 | 1 | 0:51 | Tokyo, Japan | |
| Win | 3–0 | Hisao Ikeda | KO (punches) | Shooto: Vale Tudo Junction 3 | May 7, 1996 | 1 | 0:47 | Tokyo, Japan | |
| Win | 2–0 | Kimihito Nonaka | Decision (majority) | Shooto: Vale Tudo Junction 1 | January 20, 1996 | 3 | 3:00 | Tokyo, Japan | |
| Win | 1–0 | Magnum Kawamura | Decision (unanimous) | Shooto: Vale Tudo Access 4 | May 12, 1995 | 3 | 3:00 | Japan | |

== See also ==
- List of male mixed martial artists
