= Paul Jones (mixed martial artist) =

American mixed martial arts (MMA) fighter

- Born: February 10, 1963 (age 63)
- Nationality: American
- Height: 5 ft 9 in (1.75 m)
- Weight: 198 lb (90 kg; 14.1 st)
- Division: Middleweight
- Fighting out of: Boys Ranch, Texas

Mixed martial arts record
- Total: 13
- Wins: 11
- By knockout: 1
- By submission: 6
- By decision: 2
- By disqualification: 2
- Losses: 1
- By knockout: 1
- Draws: 1

Other information
- Mixed martial arts record from Sherdog

Paul Jones (born February 10, 1963) is a former American mixed martial artist.

== Career ==
He began his fighting career in Extreme Fighting. His first match against Erik Paulson resulted in a draw. Jones immediately went into USWF (Unified Shoot Wrestling Federation) after his draw and won by submission. Jones then tried Shooto, which is located in Tokyo, where he won two matches by decision. Jones went back into USWF and won seven more matches resulting in nine consecutive wins. He finally made it into the Ultimate Fighting Championship and won his match with Flavio Luiz Moura via rear naked choke submission. He was on a roll fighting in mixed martial arts until his next match came up against Chuck Liddell, a legend rising in UFC. Jones gave everything he had, but Chuck Liddell won by TKO (technical knock out). Jones went back into USWF and fought his last match against Junior Baeza and won via keylock submission.

== Post career ==
Jones retired from his fighting career after his match with Baeza and he is now coaching wrestling, cross country, and football at Boys Ranch Texas High School. He has helped many teenagers participate in state wrestling with his coaching abilities. Jones lives in Boys Ranch, Texas with his wife and three daughters.

== Career accomplishments ==
=== Mixed martial arts ===
- Ultimate Fighting Championship
  - UFC Encyclopedia Awards
    - Submission of the Night (One time) vs. Flavio Luiz Moura

== Mixed martial arts record ==
Professional record breakdown
13 matches	11 wins	1 loss
By knockout	1	1
By submission	6	0
By decision	2	0
By disqualification	2	0
Draws	1	

Res.	Record	Opponent	Method	Event	Date	Round	Time	Location	Notes
Win	11–1–1	Junior Baeza	Submission (keylock)	USWF 18: Unified Shoot Wrestling Federation 18	November 25, 2000	1	2:00	Amarillo, Texas, United States	
Loss	10–1–1	Chuck Liddell	TKO (cut)	UFC 22	September 24, 1999	1	3:53	Lake Charles, Louisiana, United States	
Win	10–0–1	Flavio Luiz Moura	Submission (rear-naked choke)	UFC 21	July 16, 1999	1	4:20	Cedar Rapids, Iowa, United States	
Win	9–0–1	Larry Parker	TKO (submission to strikes)	USWF 16: Unified Shoot Wrestling Federation 16	May 22, 1999	1	11:37	Amarillo, Texas, United States	
Win	8–0–1	Sanae Kikuta	Decision (unanimous)	Shooto: Las Grandes Viajes 6	November 27, 1998	3	5:00	Tokyo, Japan	
Win	7–0–1	Bill Scott	Disqualification (rope grabbing)	USWF 12: Unified Shoot Wrestling Federation 12	October 24, 1998	2	1:03	Amarillo, Texas, United States	
Win	6–0–1	Wayne Admire	Submission (armbar)	USWF 11: Unified Shoot Wrestling Federation 11	September 1, 1998	1	3:14	Amarillo, Texas, United States	
Win	5–0–1	David Davis	Submission (rear-naked choke)	USWF 10: Unified Shoot Wrestling Federation 10	July 25, 1998	1	2:50	Odessa, Texas, United States	
Win	4–0–1	Juan Mott	Disqualification	USWF 9: Unified Shoot Wrestling Federation 9	June 20, 1998	1	8:00	Texas, United States	
Win	3–0–1	Tony Castillo	Submission (rear-naked choke)	USWF 7: Unified Shoot Wrestling Federation 7	October 18, 1997	1	12:17	Texas, United States	
Win	2–0–1	Erik Paulson	Decision (majority)	Shooto: Reconquista 3	August 27, 1997	3	5:00	Tokyo, Japan	
Win	1–0–1	Tony Castillo	Submission (choke)	USWF 6: Unified Shoot Wrestling Federation 6	August 16, 1997	1	7:12	Amarillo, Texas, United States	
Draw	0–0–1	Erik Paulson	Draw	EF 4: Extreme Fighting 4	March 28, 1997	3	5:00	Des Moines, Iowa, United States	
