= Masaki Nishizawa =

Japanese mixed martial artist

Masaki Nishizawa 西沢正樹
- Born: February 22, 1972 (age 54); Japan
- Nationality: Japanese
- Height: 5 ft 2 in (1.57 m)
- Weight: 132 lb (60 kg; 9.4 st)
- Division: Flyweight; Bantamweight
- Team: Ugokai; Wild Phoenix
- Years active: 1998 - 2001

Mixed martial arts record
- Total: 6
- Wins: 1
- By decision: 1
- Losses: 3
- By knockout: 1
- By decision: 2
- Draws: 2

Other information
- Mixed martial arts record from Sherdog

Masaki Nishizawa Japanese: 西沢正樹 (born February 22, 1972) is a Japanese mixed martial artist. He competed in the Flyweight and Bantamweight divisions.

== Mixed martial arts record ==
Professional record breakdown
6 matches	1 win	3 losses
By knockout	0	1
By decision	1	2
Draws	2	

Res.	Record	Opponent	Method	Event	Date	Round	Time	Location	Notes
Loss	1-3-2	Masahiro Oishi	TKO (punches)	Shooto: To The Top 1	January 19, 2001	1	4:12	Tokyo, Japan	
Win	1-2-2	Norio Nishiyama	Decision (unanimous)	Shooto: R.E.A.D. 7	July 22, 2000	2	5:00	Setagaya, Tokyo, Japan	
Draw	0-2-2	Daiji Takahashi	Draw	Shooto: Gateway to the Extremes	November 4, 1999	2	5:00	Setagaya, Tokyo, Japan	
Loss	0-2-1	Shuichiro Katsumura	Decision (unanimous)	Shooto: Gig '99	April 9, 1999	2	5:00	Tokyo, Japan	
Loss	0-1-1	Masaru Gokita	Decision (unanimous)	Shooto: Las Grandes Viajes 6	November 27, 1998	2	5:00	Tokyo, Japan	
Draw	0-0-1	Hiroaki Yoshioka	Draw	Shooto: Shooter's Dream	September 18, 1998	2	5:00	Setagaya, Tokyo, Japan	

== See also ==
- List of male mixed martial artists
