= Kimihito Nonaka =

Japanese mixed martial artist

Kimihito Nonaka 野中公仁
- Born: Japan
- Nationality: Japanese
- Height: 5 ft 4 in (1.63 m)
- Weight: 143 lb (65 kg; 10.2 st)
- Division: Bantamweight; Featherweight
- Team: Purebred Omiya
- Years active: 1995 - 2006

Mixed martial arts record
- Total: 16
- Wins: 6
- By submission: 2
- By decision: 4
- Losses: 8
- By knockout: 1
- By submission: 3
- By decision: 4
- Draws: 2

Other information
- Mixed martial arts record from Sherdog

Kimihito Nonaka Japanese: 野中公仁 is a Japanese mixed martial artist. He competed in the Bantamweight and Featherweight division.

== Mixed martial arts record ==
Professional record breakdown
16 matches	6 wins	8 losses
By knockout	0	1
By submission	2	3
By decision	4	4
Draws	2	

Res.	Record	Opponent	Method	Event	Date	Round	Time	Location	Notes
Loss	6–8–2	Antonio Banuelos	TKO (punches)	FFCF 5: Unleashed	January 27, 2006	1	1:00	Mangilao, Guam	
Loss	6–7–2	Jeff Curran	Submission (rear-naked choke)	SB 35: SuperBrawl 35	April 16, 2004	3	4:35	Honolulu, Hawaii, United States	
Loss	6–6–2	Ryota Matsune	Decision (majority)	Shooto: 2/23 in Korakuen Hall	February 23, 2003	3	5:00	Tokyo, Japan	
Win	6–5–2	Hiroaki Yoshioka	Decision (unanimous)	Shooto: Gig Central 2	October 6, 2002	3	5:00	Nagoya, Aichi, Japan	
Win	5–5–2	Jose Lopez	Submission (rear naked choke)	SB 25: SuperBrawl 25	July 13, 2002	1	2:07	Honolulu, Hawaii, United States	
Loss	4–5–2	Stephen Palling	Decision (unanimous)	Shooto: To The Top 6	July 6, 2001	3	5:00	Tokyo, Japan	
Win	4–4–2	Mamoru Okochi	Decision (unanimous)	Shooto: R.E.A.D. 12	November 12, 2000	3	5:00	Tokyo, Japan	
Loss	3–4–2	Hiroyuki Abe	Decision (unanimous)	Shooto: R.E.A.D. 5	May 22, 2000	2	5:00	Tokyo, Japan	
Loss	3–3–2	Naoya Uematsu	Technical Submission (armbar)	Shooto: Renaxis 4	September 5, 1999	3	3:11	Tokyo, Japan	
Draw	3–2–2	Naoya Uematsu	Draw	Shooto: Las Grandes Viajes 6	November 27, 1998	2	5:00	Tokyo, Japan	
Loss	3–2–1	Masahiro Oishi	Submission (armbar)	Shooto: Gig '98 2nd	July 18, 1998	2	1:18	Tokyo, Japan	
Win	3–1–1	Jin Akimoto	Decision (majority)	Shooto: Reconquista 3	August 27, 1997	2	5:00	Tokyo, Japan	
Win	2–1–1	Kenzi Daikanyama	Decision (unanimous)	Shooto: Gig	June 25, 1997	2	5:00	Tokyo, Japan	
Win	1–1–1	Shinji Arano	Submission (triangle choke)	Shooto: Vale Tudo Junction 3	May 7, 1996	2	1:41	Tokyo, Japan	
Loss	0–1–1	Uchu Tatsumi	Decision (majority)	Shooto: Vale Tudo Junction 1	January 20, 1996	3	3:00	Tokyo, Japan	
Draw	0–0–1	Masahiro Oishi	Draw	Shooto: Tokyo Free Fight	November 7, 1995	3	3:00	Tokyo, Japan	

== See also ==
- List of male mixed martial artists
