= Masahiro Oishi =

Japanese mixed martial artist

- Born: November 29, 1968 (age 57); Shimizu, Japan
- Native name: 大石真丈
- Nationality: Japanese
- Height: 5 ft 7 in (1.70 m)
- Weight: 135 lb (61 kg; 9.6 st)
- Division: Bantamweight; Featherweight
- Style: Wrestling, Brazilian Jiu Jitsu
- Stance: Orthodox
- Team: K'z Shooto Gym
- Years active: 1993 - present

Mixed martial arts record
- Total: 66
- Wins: 31
- By knockout: 4
- By submission: 21
- By decision: 6
- Losses: 26
- By knockout: 9
- By submission: 10
- By decision: 7
- Draws: 9

Other information
- Mixed martial arts record from Sherdog

Masahiro Oishi Japanese: 大石真丈 (born November 29, 1968) is a Japanese mixed martial artist. He competes in the Bantamweight and Featherweight divisions.

He has competed for numerous promotions during his career, most notably Shooto, Pancrase and ZST. He is the former Shooto World Featherweight (132 lb) Champion.

== Martial arts career ==
Oishi made his debut in 1993, in Shooto, when he faced Yoshiaki Murai, winning a unanimous decision. He would accumulate a 7-5-3- record, but earned a title shot off of a two fight win streak over Masaki Nishizawa and Yoshinobu Ota. During Shooto: To The Top 10, he faced the reigning featherweight champion Mamoru Yamaguchi. He won the fight in the first round by submission. He defended the title versus Hisao Ikeda, before losing it to Ryota Matsune through a unanimous decision.

From there Oishi moved to ZST. He lost to Hideo Tokoro in the opening of the ZST Grand Prix, which was considered an upset at the time. He would go on to accumulate a 3–3 record in ZST, avenging his loss to Tokoro.

Moving to Cage Force, he earned a title shot by beating Paul McVeigh and Tetsu Suzuki. Facing the reigning champion Takeya Mizugaki, he would lose by way of TKO in the second round.

Moving to Pancrase he made history, by becoming the first Shooto champion to fight in Pancrase when he faced Manabu Inoue. He lost a unanimous decision. He would go on to fight for various promotions, achieving a 10-9-2 record.

== Championships and Accomplishments ==
- Shooto
  - Shooto World Featherweight (132 lb) Championship (One time)
    - One successful title defense

== Mixed martial arts record ==
Professional record breakdown
66 matches	31 wins	26 losses
By knockout	4	9
By submission	21	10
By decision	6	7
Draws	9	

Res.	Record	Opponent	Method	Event	Date	Round	Time	Location	Notes
Win	31–26–9	Yuito Hirano	Submission (triangle choke)	GFG 4	November 3, 2024	1	1:13	Goshogawara, Japan	
Loss	30–26–9	Yusuke Yamashita	Decision (split)	GFG 3	November 19, 2023	2	5:00	Goshogawara, Japan	
Loss	30–25–9	Taku Fuita	TKO (punches)	Fighting NEXUS vol. 31	May 21, 2023	1	0:56	Tokyo, Japan	
Loss	30–24–9	Takuya Ogura	Submission (armbar)	Fighting NEXUS vol. 29	November 7, 2022	1	2:26	Tokyo, Japan	
Loss	30–23–9	Toshihiro Shimizu	Submission (leg scissor choke)	Fighting NEXUS vol. 28	August 7, 2022	1	4:47	Tokyo, Japan	
Win	30–22–9	Toru Fujii	Decision (Majority)	Fighting NEXUS vol. 22	April 4, 2021	2	5:00	Tokyo, Japan	
Loss	29–21–9	Shunichi Shimizu	Submission (Armbar)	GLADIATOR 012	February 23, 2020	2	4:48	Osaka, Japan	
Loss	29–20–9	Tatsuya Karasawa	Decision (Unanimous)	Fighting NEXUS vol. 18	November 24, 2019	2	5:00	Tokyo, Japan	
Win	29–19–9	Sung Hoon Jung	Submission (Triangle choke)	Arzalet Fighting 5	March 23, 2019	2	5:00	Seoul, South Korea	
Win	28–19–9	Yong Jae Oh	Decision (Unanimous)	Arzalet Fighting 4	November 24, 2018	2	5:00	Seoul, South Korea	
Win	27–19–9	Jong Moon Bae	Submission (Guillotine choke)	Arzalet Fighting 3	July 7, 2018	1	1:05	Seoul, South Korea	
Loss	26–19–9	Cleber Luciano	Submission (Rear naked choke)	Arzalet Fighting 2	October 21, 2017	2	1:51	Curitiba, Brazil	
Win	26–18–9	Junichi Hirata	Submission (Armbar)	GRACHAN 25 x BFC Vol. 2	October 10, 2016	1	2:31	Tokyo, Japan	
Win	25–18–9	Hirotaka Miyakawa	Submission (Armbar)	DEEP 75: Impact	February 27, 2016	1	1:45	Tokyo, Japan	
Loss	24–18–9	Takeya Takemoto	Decision (Unanimous)	GRANDSLAM 3: Way of the Cage	September 12, 2015	2	5:00	Tokyo, Japan	
Win	24–17–9	Atsushi Tanaka	Submission (armbar)	Heat: Heat 32	June 8, 2014	2	2:36	Tokyo, Japan	
Win	23–17–9	Takaaki Ito	Submission (rear-naked choke)	Grachan: Grachan 10	July 15, 2013	1	4:45	Tokyo, Japan	
Loss	22–17–9	Masakazu Imanari	Submission (toe hold)	Deep: 59 Impact	August 18, 2012	1	1:01	Tokyo, Japan	
Win	22–16–9	Tomoaki Ueyama	Submission (armbar)	Grachan: Grachan 6	June 16, 2012	1	1:57	Tokyo, Japan	
Loss	21–16–9	Yuta Numakura	Decision (unanimous)	Pancrase: Progress Tour 1	January 28, 2012	2	5:00	Tokyo, Japan	
Draw	21–15–9	Tashiro Nishiuchi	Draw (majority)	Pancrase: Impressive Tour 9	September 4, 2011	3	5:00	Tokyo, Japan	
Loss	21–15–8	Abdul Guyirbegov	KO (head kick)	FEFoMP: Battle of Amur	July 16, 2011	1	2:46	Blagoveshchensk, Russia	
Draw	21–14–8	Masaya Takita	Draw	Pancrase: Impressive Tour 1	February 6, 2011	2	5:00	Tokyo, Japan	
Win	21–14–7	Hirokazu Nishimura	TKO (corner stoppage)	Pancrase: Passion Tour 10	November 3, 2010	2	3:46	Tokyo, Japan	
Win	20–14–7	Takumi Murata	Submission (triangle choke)	Pancrase: Passion Tour 7	August 8, 2010	1	3:34	Tokyo, Japan	
Loss	19–14–7	Michael Mortimer	TKO (doctor stoppage)	Rize 5: Revolution	May 29, 2010	3	3:47	Chandler, Queensland, Australia	For the Rize Bantamweight Championship
Loss	19–13–7	Manabu Inoue	Decision (unanimous)	Pancrase: Changing Tour 6	October 25, 2009	3	5:00	Tokyo, Japan	For the Pancrase Bantamweight Championship.
Loss	19–12–7	Gustavo Falciroli	TKO (punches)	Rize 1: Rize MMA	May 23, 2009	2	2:02	Mansfield, Queensland, Australia	
Loss	19–11–7	Takeya Mizugaki	TKO (punches)	GCM: Cage Force 9	December 6, 2008	2	0:57	Tokyo, Japan	For the Cage Force Bantamweight Championship
Win	19–10–7	Tetsu Suzuki	Decision (unanimous)	GCM: Cage Force 8	September 27, 2008	3	5:00	Tokyo, Japan	
Win	18–10–7	Paul McVeigh	TKO (punches)	GCM: Cage Force 6	April 5, 2008	2	3:13	Tokyo, Japan	
Win	17–10–7	Artemij Sitenkov	Submission (triangle choke)	K-1 HERO's: HERO's Lithuania 2007	November 10, 2007	2	1:40	Vilnius, Vilnius County, Lithuania	
Win	16–10–7	Taiyo Nakahara	TKO (eye injury)	GCM: Cage Force 4	September 8, 2007	1	3:55	Tokyo, Japan	
Win	15–10–7	Wataru Inatsu	Submission (armbar)	Zst: Zst 13	June 10, 2007	1	2:59	Tokyo, Japan	
Draw	14–10–7	Kentaro Imaizumi	Draw	Zst: Zst 12	February 12, 2007	2	5:00	Tokyo, Japan	
Loss	14–10–6	Sergej Grecicho	KO (head kick)	Zst: Zst 10	September 10, 2006	1	0:31	Tokyo, Japan	
Win	14–9–6	Sergej Juskevic	Submission (armbar)	Shooto Lithuania: Bushido	April 23, 2006	1	2:57	Vilnius, Vilnius County, Lithuania	
Win	13–9–6	Masayuki Okude	Submission (reverse triangle choke)	Zst: Zst 8	November 23, 2005	2	0:44	Tokyo, Japan	
Win	12–9–6	Jin Akimoto	Technical Submission (armbar)	Shooto 2005: 7/30 in Korakuen Hall	July 30, 2005	1	3:14	Tokyo, Japan	
Draw	11–9–6	Ryusuke Uemura	Draw	Zst: Zst 7	May 3, 2005	3	5:00	Tokyo, Japan	
Draw	11–9–5	Eugenij Konkov	Draw	Shooto Lithuania: Chaosas	April 7, 2005	0	0:00	Vilnius, Vilnius County, Lithuania	
Loss	11–9–4	Remigijus Morkevicius	KO (punches)	Zst: Grand Prix 2 Final Round	January 23, 2005	1	3:13	Tokyo, Japan	
Win	11–8–4	Hideo Tokoro	Decision (split)	Zst: Grand Prix 2 Final Round	January 23, 2005	3	3:00	Tokyo, Japan	
Win	10–8–4	Stephen Gillinder	Submission (armbar)	Zst: Grand Prix 2 Opening Round	November 3, 2004	1	0:31	Tokyo, Japan	
Loss	9–8–4	Jeff Curran	Technical Submission (Guillotine Choke)	Zst: Zst 6	September 12, 2004	1	0:44	Tokyo, Japan	
Win	9–7–4	Takahiro Uchiyama	Submission (armbar)	Zst: Zst 5	May 5, 2004	1	4:31	Tokyo, Japan	
Loss	8–7–4	Hideo Tokoro	Submission (armbar)	Zst: Grand Prix Opening Round	November 23, 2003	1	3:13	Tokyo, Japan	
Loss	8–6–4	Ryota Matsune	Decision (majority)	Shooto: 8/10 in Yokohama Cultural Gymnasium	August 10, 2003	3	5:00	Yokohama, Kanagawa, Japan	Lost the Shooto World Featherweight (132 lb) Championship
Draw	8–5–4	Hisao Ikeda	Draw	Shooto: Treasure Hunt 10	September 16, 2002	3	5:00	Yokohama, Kanagawa, Japan	Retained the Shooto World Featherweight (132 lb) Championship
Win	8–5–3	Mamoru Yamaguchi	Submission (triangle armbar)	Shooto: To The Top 10	November 25, 2001	1	1:44	Tokyo, Japan	Won the Shooto World Featherweight (132 lb) Championship
Win	7–5–3	Yoshinobu Ota	Submission (rear naked choke)	Shooto: To The Top 2	March 2, 2001	2	2:48	Tokyo, Japan	
Win	6–5–3	Masaki Nishizawa	TKO (punches)	Shooto: To The Top 1	January 19, 2001	1	4:12	Tokyo, Japan	
Loss	5–5–3	Baret Yoshida	Submission (rear naked choke)	Shooto: R.E.A.D. 5	May 22, 2000	2	1:48	Tokyo, Japan	
Draw	5–4–3	Hiroyuki Abe	Draw	Shooto: Renaxis 4	September 5, 1999	2	5:00	Tokyo, Japan	
Loss	5–4–2	Alexandre Franca Nogueira	Submission (armbar)	Shooto: Renaxis 1	March 28, 1999	1	3:11	Tokyo, Japan	
Loss	5–3–2	Cheyanne Padeken	KO (punches)	SB 11: SuperBrawl 11	February 2, 1999	1	1:18	Honolulu, Hawaii, United States	
Win	5–2–2	Kimihito Nonaka	Submission (armbar)	Shooto: Gig '98 2nd	July 18, 1998	2	1:18	Tokyo, Japan	
Win	4–2–2	Yoshihiro Fujita	Technical Submission (kimura)	Shooto: Las Grandes Viajes 2	March 1, 1998	1	2:40	Tokyo, Japan	
Loss	3–2–2	Hisao Ikeda	Decision (unanimous)	Shooto: Reconquista 3	August 27, 1997	2	5:00	Tokyo, Japan	
Win	3–1–2	Yoshiyuki Takayama	Decision (unanimous)	Shooto: Gig	June 25, 1997	2	5:00	Tokyo, Japan	
Win	2–1–2	Katsuhisa Akasaki	Submission (armbar)	Shooto: Let's Get Lost	October 4, 1996	1	2:12	Tokyo, Japan	
Draw	1–1–2	Hisao Ikeda	Draw	Shooto: Vale Tudo Junction 2	March 5, 1996	3	3:00	Tokyo, Japan	
Draw	1–1–1	Kimihito Nonaka	Draw	Shooto: Tokyo Free Fight	November 7, 1995	3	3:00	Tokyo, Japan	
Loss	1–1	Masato Suzuki	Submission (armbar)	Shooto: Vale Tudo Access 1	September 26, 1994	2	0:43	Tokyo, Japan	
Win	1–0	Yoshiaki Murai	Decision (unanimous)	Shooto: Shooto	November 25, 1993	3	3:00	Tokyo, Japan	

== See also ==
- List of male mixed martial artists
