= Masaru Gokita =

Japanese mixed martial artist

Masaru Gokita 後田勝
- Born: August 29, 1970 (age 56); Japan
- Nationality: Japanese
- Height: 5 ft 3 in (1.60 m)
- Weight: 136 lb (62 kg; 9.7 st)
- Division: Bantamweight
- Team: Gokita Gym
- Years active: 1997 - 2002

Mixed martial arts record
- Total: 8
- Wins: 1
- By decision: 1
- Losses: 5
- By knockout: 1
- By decision: 4
- Draws: 2

Other information
- Mixed martial arts record from Sherdog

Masaru Gokita (born September 29, 1970; Japanese: 後田勝) is a Japanese mixed martial artist. He competed in the Bantamweight division.

== Mixed martial arts record ==
Professional record breakdown
8 matches	1 win	5 losses
By knockout	0	1
By decision	1	4
Draws	2	

Res.	Record	Opponent	Method	Event	Date	Round	Time	Location	Notes
Loss	1-5-2	Yasuhiro Urushitani	Decision (unanimous)	Shooto: Treasure Hunt 4	March 13, 2002	2	5:00	Setagaya, Tokyo, Japan	
Draw	1-4-2	Toshiteru Ishii	Draw	GCM: The Contenders X-Rage 1	December 14, 2001	2	5:00	Tokyo, Japan	
Loss	1-4-1	Hiroaki Yoshioka	KO (head kick)	Shooto: R.E.A.D. 10	September 15, 2000	1	0:17	Tokyo, Japan	
Draw	1-3-1	Mamoru Yamaguchi	Draw	Shooto: R.E.A.D. 2	March 17, 2000	2	5:00	Tokyo, Japan	
Loss	1-3	Takeyasu Hirono	Decision (unanimous)	Shooto: Renaxis 4	September 5, 1999	2	5:00	Tokyo, Japan	
Win	1-2	Masaki Nishizawa	Decision (unanimous)	Shooto: Las Grandes Viajes 6	November 27, 1998	2	5:00	Tokyo, Japan	
Loss	0-2	Jin Akimoto	Decision (majority)	Shooto: Las Grandes Viajes 5	August 29, 1998	2	5:00	Tokyo, Japan	
Loss	0-1	Mitsuhiro Sakamoto	Decision (majority)	Shooto: Reconquista 2	April 6, 1997	2	5:00	Tokyo, Japan	

== See also ==
- List of male mixed martial artists
