= Yoshiyuki Takayama =

Japanese mixed martial artist

- Born: Japan
- Nationality: Japanese
- Years active: 1996 - 1999

Mixed martial arts record
- Total: 6
- Wins: 3
- By submission: 1
- By decision: 2
- Losses: 3
- By submission: 1
- By decision: 2

Other information
- Website: 2
- Mixed martial arts record from Sherdog

Yoshiyuki Takayama is a Japanese mixed martial artist.

== Mixed martial arts record ==
Professional record breakdown
8 matches	3 wins	3 losses
By submission	1	1
By decision	2	2
Draws	2	

Res.	Record	Opponent	Method	Event	Date	Round	Time	Location	Notes
Draw	3-3-2	Mamoru Okochi	Draw	Shooto: Gateway to the Extremes	November 4, 1999	2	5:00	Setagaya, Tokyo, Japan	
Loss	3-3-1	Hiroyuki Abe	Decision (unanimous)	Shooto: 10th Anniversary Event	May 29, 1999	2	5:00	Yokohama, Kanagawa, Japan	
Draw	3-2-1	Mamoru Okochi	Draw	Shooto: Shooter's Dream	September 18, 1998	2	5:00	Setagaya, Tokyo, Japan	
Win	3-2	Yoshihiro Fujita	Decision (majority)	Shooto: Gig '98 2nd	July 18, 1998	2	5:00	Tokyo, Japan	
Win	2-2	Katsuhisa Akasaki	Submission (rear naked choke)	Shooto: Gig '98 1st	April 10, 1998	1	3:34	Tokyo, Japan	
Loss	1-2	Masahiro Oishi	Decision (unanimous)	Shooto: Gig	June 25, 1997	2	5:00	Tokyo, Japan	
Win	1-1	Ed Wedding	Decision (unanimous)	Shooto: Reconquista 1	January 18, 1997	3	3:00	Tokyo, Japan	
Loss	0-1	Hisao Ikeda	Submission (kimura)	Shooto: Vale Tudo Junction 1	January 20, 1996	3	2:57	Tokyo, Japan	

== See also ==
- List of male mixed martial artists
