= Takenori Ito =

American martial artist

Takenori Ito 伊藤武典
- Born: Japan
- Nationality: Japanese
- Team: Tsudanuma Dojo
- Years active: 1991 - 1999

Mixed martial arts record
- Total: 11
- Wins: 6
- By submission: 2
- By decision: 4
- Losses: 3
- By submission: 1
- By decision: 2
- Draws: 2

Other information
- Mixed martial arts record from Sherdog

Takenori Ito Japanese: 伊藤武典 is a Japanese mixed martial artist.

== Mixed martial arts record ==
Professional record breakdown
| 11 matches | 6 wins | 3 losses |
| By submission | 2 | 1 |
| By decision | 4 | 2 |
| Draws | 2 | |

| Res. | Record | Opponent | Method | Event | Date | Round | Time | Location | Notes |
|---|---|---|---|---|---|---|---|---|---|
| Win | 6–3–2 | Kazuya Abe | Decision (majority) | Shooto - Renaxis 3 | August 4, 1999 | 2 | 5:00 | Setagaya, Japan | |
| Draw | 5–3–2 | Masato Fujiwara | Draw | Shooto - Las Grandes Viajes 6 | November 27, 1998 | 3 | 5:00 | Tokyo, Japan | |
| Draw | 5–3–1 | Kazumichi Takada | Draw | Shooto - Las Grandes Viajes 5 | August 29, 1998 | 2 | 5:00 | Tokyo, Japan | |
| Loss | 5–3 | Takuya Kuwabara | Decision (majority) | Shooto - Gig '98 1st | April 10, 1998 | 3 | 5:00 | Tokyo, Japan | |
| Win | 5–2 | Hiroki Kotani | Decision (unanimous) | Shooto - Las Grandes Viajes 2 | March 1, 1998 | 2 | 5:00 | Tokyo, Japan | |
| Win | 4–2 | Naoto Kojima | Decision (majority) | Shooto - Reconquista 4 | October 12, 1997 | 2 | 5:00 | Tokyo, Japan | |
| Loss | 3–2 | Kyuhei Ueno | Submission (armbar) | Shooto - Shooto | April 26, 1993 | 1 | 2:35 | Tokyo, Japan | |
| Win | 3–1 | Masato Suzuki | Decision (unanimous) | Shooto - Shooto | February 26, 1993 | 3 | 3:00 | Tokyo, Japan | |
| Win | 2–1 | Norito Ogasawara | Submission (armbar) | Shooto - Shooto | September 25, 1992 | 1 | 1:53 | Tokyo, Japan | |
| Loss | 1–1 | Masato Suzuki | Decision (unanimous) | Shooto - Shooto | March 27, 1992 | 3 | 3:00 | Tokyo, Japan | |
| Win | 1–0 | Yoshihiko Abe | Submission (armbar) | Shooto - Shooto | December 23, 1991 | 1 | 0:00 | Tokyo, Japan | |

== See also ==
- List of male mixed martial artists
