= Mitsuhiro Sakamoto =

Japanese mixed martial artist

Mitsuhiro Sakamoto 坂本光弘
- Born: Japan
- Nationality: Japanese
- Weight: 132 lb (60 kg; 9.4 st)
- Division: Bantamweight
- Team: Purebred Omiya
- Years active: 1996 - 1999

Mixed martial arts record
- Total: 5
- Wins: 2
- By decision: 2
- Losses: 0
- Draws: 3

Other information
- Mixed martial arts record from Sherdog

Mitsuhiro Sakamoto Japanese: 坂本光弘 is a Japanese mixed martial artist. He competed in the Bantamweight division.

== Mixed martial arts record ==
Professional record breakdown
| 5 matches | 2 wins | 0 losses |
| By decision | 2 | 0 |
| Draws | 3 | |

| Res. | Record | Opponent | Method | Event | Date | Round | Time | Location | Notes |
|---|---|---|---|---|---|---|---|---|---|
| Draw | 2-0-3 | Norio Nishiyama | Draw | Shooto: Shooter's Passion | May 27, 1999 | 2 | 5:00 | Setagaya, Tokyo, Japan | |
| Draw | 2-0-2 | Takeyasu Hirono | Draw | Shooto: Las Grandes Viajes 4 | July 29, 1998 | 2 | 5:00 | Tokyo, Japan | |
| Win | 2-0-1 | Masaru Gokita | Decision (majority) | Shooto: Reconquista 2 | April 6, 1997 | 2 | 5:00 | Tokyo, Japan | |
| Win | 1-0-1 | Jin Akimoto | Decision (majority) | Shooto: Let's Get Lost | October 4, 1996 | 3 | 3:00 | Tokyo, Japan | |
| Draw | 0-0-1 | Jin Akimoto | Draw | Shooto: Vale Tudo Junction 3 | May 7, 1996 | 3 | 3:00 | Tokyo, Japan | |

== See also ==
- List of male mixed martial artists
