= Hiroyuki Kojima =

Japanese mixed martial artist

Hiroyuki Kojima 小島弘之
- Born: Japan
- Nationality: Japanese
- Weight: 167 lb (76 kg; 11.9 st)
- Division: Welterweight; Lightweight
- Years active: 1996 - 1999

Mixed martial arts record
- Total: 9
- Wins: 4
- By submission: 2
- By decision: 2
- Losses: 4
- By knockout: 2
- By decision: 2
- Draws: 1

Other information
- Mixed martial arts record from Sherdog

Hiroyuki Kojima Japanese: 小島弘之 is a Japanese mixed martial artist. He competed in the Welterweight division.

== Mixed martial arts record ==
Professional record breakdown
9 matches	4 wins	4 losses
By knockout	0	2
By submission	2	0
By decision	2	2
Draws	1	

Res.	Record	Opponent	Method	Event	Date	Round	Time	Location	Notes
Draw	4–4–1	Takaharu Murahama	Draw	Shooto: Shooter's Ambition	October 6, 1999	2	5:00	Setagaya, Tokyo, Japan	
Loss	4–4	Tetsuji Kato	TKO (punches)	Shooto: Las Grandes Viajes 6	November 27, 1998	2	4:28	Tokyo, Japan	
Win	4–3	Saburo Kawakatsu	Decision (unanimous)	Shooto: Las Grandes Viajes 5	August 29, 1998	2	5:00	Tokyo, Japan	Lightweight bout.
Win	3–3	Isao Tanimura	Technical Submission (kimura)	Shooto: Gig '98 2nd	July 18, 1998	1	4:37	Tokyo, Japan	
Loss	2–3	Takaharu Murahama	KO (punch)	Shooto: Las Grandes Viajes 2	March 1, 1998	1	2:31	Tokyo, Japan	
Loss	2–2	Hayato Sakurai	Decision (unanimous)	Shooto: Gig	June 25, 1997	2	5:00	Tokyo, Japan	Return to Welterweight.
Loss	2–1	Tetsuji Kato	Decision (unanimous)	Shooto: Reconquista 2	April 6, 1997	2	5:00	Tokyo, Japan	Lightweight debut.
Win	2–0	Yuji Fujita	Decision (unanimous)	Shooto: Reconquista 1	January 18, 1997	3	3:00	Tokyo, Japan	
Win	1–0	Yuzo Tateishi	Submission (kimura)	Shooto: Let's Get Lost	October 4, 1996	1	3:00	Tokyo, Japan	

== See also ==
- List of male mixed martial artists
