= Masato Fujiwara =

Japanese mixed martial arts fighter (born 1976)

- Born: January 23, 1976 (age 50); Japan
- Nationality: Japanese
- Height: 5 ft 10 in (1.78 m)
- Weight: 154 lb (70 kg; 11.0 st)
- Division: Middleweight; Lightweight; Featherweight
- Team: Paraestra Tokyo
- Years active: 1996 - 2010

Mixed martial arts record
- Total: 23
- Wins: 5
- By knockout: 1
- By submission: 2
- By decision: 2
- Losses: 12
- By knockout: 2
- By submission: 2
- By decision: 8
- Draws: 6

Other information
- Mixed martial arts record from Sherdog

Masato Fujiwara (born January 23, 1976; Japanese: 藤原正人) is a Japanese mixed martial artist.

== Mixed martial arts record ==
Professional record breakdown
23 matches	5 wins	12 losses
By knockout	1	2
By submission	2	2
By decision	2	8
Draws	6	

Res.	Record	Opponent	Method	Event	Date	Round	Time	Location	Notes
Loss	5–12–6	Koji Nishioka	Decision (majority)	Shooto: Kitazawa Shooto Vol. 4	September 17, 2010	2	5:00	Tokyo, Japan	
Draw	5–11–6	Hidekazu Asakura	Draw	Shooto: Gig North 5	February 14, 2010	2	5:00	Sapporo, Hokkaido, Japan	
Loss	5–11–5	Kenichi Hattori	Decision (majority)	Shooto: Gig Central 16	October 26, 2008	2	5:00	Nagoya, Aichi, Japan	
Loss	5–10–5	Shinji Sasaki	Submission (triangle choke)	Shooto: Grapplingman 6	May 13, 2007	1	3:04	Hiroshima, Japan	
Win	5–9–5	Shinobu Miura	Decision (split)	Shooto: 11/30 in Kitazawa Town Hall	November 30, 2006	2	5:00	Setagaya, Tokyo, Japan	
Loss	4–9–5	Masaya Takita	Decision (unanimous)	Shooto: Shooto Junkie Is Back!	June 27, 2004	2	5:00	Chiba, Japan	
Loss	4–8–5	Takashi Nakakura	Submission (triangle choke)	Shooto 2003: 6/27 in Hiroshima Sun Plaza	June 27, 2003	1	3:48	Hiroshima, Japan	
Loss	4–7–5	Naoki Matsushita	Decision (unanimous)	Shooto: Gig Central 3	March 30, 2003	2	5:00	Nagoya, Aichi, Japan	
Loss	4–6–5	Takayuki Okochi	TKO (punches)	Shooto: Gig East 11	September 25, 2002	2	4:24	Tokyo, Japan	
Draw	4–5–5	Naoki Matsushita	Draw	Shooto: Gig East 10	August 27, 2002	2	5:00	Tokyo, Japan	
Win	4–5–4	Vincent Latoel	Submission (triangle/armbar)	Shooto: Wanna Shooto 2002	April 14, 2002	1	3:53	Setagaya, Tokyo, Japan	
Win	3–5–4	Koji Takeuchi	Decision (unanimous)	Shooto: To The Top 10	November 25, 2001	2	5:00	Tokyo, Japan	
Loss	2–5–4	Takeshi Yamazaki	Decision (unanimous)	Shooto: Gig East 4	July 27, 2001	2	5:00	Tokyo, Japan	
Draw	2–4–4	Daisuke Sugie	Draw	Shooto: Gig East 2	May 22, 2001	2	5:00	Tokyo, Japan	
Win	2–4–3	Masakazu Kuramochi	TKO (cut)	Shooto: Gig East 1	April 28, 2001	1	1:01	Tokyo, Japan	
Loss	1–4–3	Ryan Bow	KO (knees)	Shooto: R.E.A.D. 4	April 12, 2000	1	2:19	Setagaya, Tokyo, Japan	
Draw	1–3–3	Takenori Ito	Draw	Shooto: Las Grandes Viajes 6	November 27, 1998	3	5:00	Tokyo, Japan	Return to Lightweight.
Draw	1–3–2	Koichi Tanaka	Draw	Shooto: Las Grandes Viajes 3	May 13, 1998	2	5:00	Tokyo, Japan	Featherweight debut.
Loss	1–3–1	Ricardo Botelho	Decision (unanimous)	Shooto: Las Grandes Viajes 1	January 17, 1998	3	5:00	Tokyo, Japan	
Loss	1–2–1	Tetsuji Kato	Decision (unanimous)	Shooto: Gig	June 25, 1997	2	5:00	Tokyo, Japan	
Draw	1–1–1	Kazuhiro Kusayanagi	Draw	Shooto: Reconquista 2	April 6, 1997	3	5:00	Tokyo, Japan	Return to Lightweight.
Loss	1–1	Akihiro Gono	Decision (unanimous)	Shooto: Reconquista 1	January 18, 1997	4	3:00	Tokyo, Japan	Middleweight debut.
Win	1–0	Masanori Suda	Submission (triangle armbar)	Shooto: Let's Get Lost	October 4, 1996	1	2:15	Tokyo, Japan	

== See also ==
- List of male mixed martial artists
