= Mamoru Okochi =

Japanese mixed martial artist

Mamoru Okochi 大河内守
- Born: Japan
- Nationality: Japanese
- Height: 5 ft 7 in (1.70 m)
- Weight: 132 lb (60 kg; 9.4 st)
- Team: Okochi Gundan
- Years active: 1991 - 2006

Mixed martial arts record
- Total: 25
- Wins: 10
- By knockout: 1
- By submission: 4
- By decision: 5
- Losses: 13
- By knockout: 2
- By submission: 3
- By decision: 8
- Draws: 2

Other information
- Mixed martial arts record from Sherdog

Mamoru Okochi Japanese: 大河内守 is a Japanese mixed martial artist.

== Mixed martial arts record ==
Professional record breakdown
25 matches	10 wins	13 losses
By knockout	1	2
By submission	4	3
By decision	5	8
Draws	2	

Res.	Record	Opponent	Method	Event	Date	Round	Time	Location	Notes
Win	10-13-2	Hiroharu Matsufuji	TKO (punches)	Shooto: 11/30 in Kitazawa Town Hall	November 30, 2006	2	2:30	Setagaya, Japan	
Loss	9-13-2	Yuki Shojo	Decision (unanimous)	Shooto 2006: 5/28 in Kitazawa Town Hall	May 28, 2006	2	5:00	Setagaya, Japan	
Loss	9-12-2	Takahiro Hosoi	TKO (punches)	Shooto - Soulful Fight	October 28, 2005	1	1:51	Setagaya, Japan	
Loss	9-11-2	Kimihito Nonaka	Decision (unanimous)	Shooto - R.E.A.D. 12	November 12, 2000	3	5:00	Tokyo, Japan	
Loss	9-10-2	Baret Yoshida	Decision (majority)	Shooto - R.E.A.D. 10	September 15, 2000	3	5:00	Tokyo, Japan	
Loss	9-9-2	Alexandre Franca Nogueira	Decision (unanimous)	Shooto - R.E.A.D. 3	April 2, 2000	3	5:00	Kadoma, Osaka, Japan	
Draw	9-8-2	Yoshiyuki Takayama	Draw	Shooto - Gateway to the Extremes	November 4, 1999	2	5:00	Setagaya, Japan	
Loss	9-8-1	Naoya Uematsu	TKO (punches)	Shooto - Shooter's Soul	January 27, 1999	2	1:22	Setagaya, Japan	
Draw	9-7-1	Yoshiyuki Takayama	Draw	Shooto - Shooter's Dream	September 18, 1998	2	5:00	Setagaya, Japan	
Loss	9-7	Hisao Ikeda	Decision (unanimous)	Shooto - Gig '98 2nd	July 18, 1998	3	5:00	Tokyo, Japan	
Loss	9-6	Uchu Tatsumi	Decision (unanimous)	Shooto - Reconquista 1	January 18, 1997	5	3:00	Tokyo, Japan	
Win	9-5	Anthony Lange	Decision (majority)	Shooto - Vale Tudo Junction 2	March 5, 1996	5	3:00	Tokyo, Japan	
Win	8-5	Satoshi Fukuoka	Technical Submission (triangle choke)	Shooto - Vale Tudo Access 3	January 21, 1995	1	1:02	Tokyo, Japan	
Loss	7-5	Kenichi Tanaka	Submission (arm-triangle choke)	Shooto - Vale Tudo Access 1	September 26, 1994	1	2:51	Tokyo, Japan	
Win	7-4	Tomoyuki Saito	Submission (armbar)	Shooto - Shooto	May 6, 1994	1	2:43	Tokyo, Japan	
Win	6-4	Tadashi Murakami	Decision (unanimous)	Shooto - Shooto	January 14, 1994	5	3:00	Tokyo, Japan	
Loss	5-4	Takeshi Miyanaga	Decision (unanimous)	Shooto - Shooto	November 25, 1993	3	3:00	Tokyo, Japan	
Loss	5-3	Kazuhiro Sakamoto	Submission (kimura)	Shooto - Shooto	April 26, 1993	3	0:35	Tokyo, Japan	
Win	5-2	Tadashi Murakami	Decision (unanimous)	Shooto - Shooto	July 23, 1992	3	3:00	Tokyo, Japan	
Win	4-2	Takashi Nishizawa	Submission (triangle choke)	Shooto - Shooto	May 29, 1992	1	0:00	Tokyo, Japan	
Win	3-2	Akiyuki Takatsuka	Decision (unanimous)	Shooto - Shooto	March 27, 1992	3	3:00	Tokyo, Japan	
Loss	2-2	Suguru Shigeno	Decision (unanimous)	Shooto - Shooto	August 3, 1991	3	3:00	Tokyo, Japan	
Win	2-1	Misaki Kubota	Decision (unanimous)	Shooto - Shooto	May 31, 1991	3	3:00	Tokyo, Japan	
Loss	1-1	Tomoyuki Saito	Submission (rear-naked choke)	Shooto - Shooto	March 29, 1991	2	0:00	Tokyo, Japan	
Win	1-0	Makoto Mizoguchi	Submission (rear-naked choke)	Shooto - Shooto	January 13, 1991	2	0:00	Tokyo, Japan	

== See also ==
- List of male mixed martial artists
