= Saburo Kawakatsu =

Japanese mixed martial artist

Saburo Kawakatsu 火若津将軍
- Born: June 18, 1974 (age 52); Japan
- Other names: Shogun
- Nationality: Japanese
- Height: 5 ft 7 in (1.70 m)
- Weight: 154 lb (70 kg; 11.0 st)
- Division: Lightweight; Welterweight
- Style: Karate, Nippon Kempo, Boxing, Brazilian Jiu-Jitsu, Judo
- Team: Purebred Omiya
- Years active: 1996 - 2006

Mixed martial arts record
- Total: 13
- Wins: 5
- By submission: 1
- By decision: 4
- Losses: 7
- By knockout: 2
- By submission: 1
- By decision: 4
- Draws: 1

Other information
- Mixed martial arts record from Sherdog

Saburo Kawakatsu Japanese: 火若津将軍 (born June 18, 1974) is a Japanese mixed martial artist. He competed in the Lightweight and Welterweight divisions.

== Mixed martial arts record ==
Professional record breakdown
13 matches	5 wins	7 losses
By knockout	0	2
By submission	1	1
By decision	4	4
Draws	1	

Res.	Record	Opponent	Method	Event	Date	Round	Time	Location	Notes
Loss	5–7–1	Takahiro Kajita	TKO (punches)	Shooto: Gig Central 11	November 26, 2006	1	4:43	Nagoya, Aichi, Japan	
Loss	5–6–1	Daisuke Sugie	Decision (unanimous)	Shooto: Gig Central 6	September 12, 2004	3	5:00	Nagoya, Aichi, Japan	
Loss	5–5–1	Takashi Nakakura	Decision (unanimous)	Shooto: Gig West 4	October 12, 2003	2	5:00	Osaka, Japan	
Loss	5–4–1	Robbie Lawler	TKO (punches)	Shogun 1: Shogun 1	December 15, 2001	1	4:49	Honolulu, Hawaii, United States	
Win	5–3–1	Chad W. Saunders	Decision (unanimous)	Shooto: R.E.A.D. 12	November 12, 2000	2	5:00	Tokyo, Japan	
Win	4–3–1	Seichi Ikemoto	Decision (unanimous)	Shooto: R.E.A.D. 8	August 4, 2000	2	5:00	Osaka, Japan	
Win	3–3–1	Tomonori Ohara	Submission (armbar)	Shooto: R.E.A.D. 3	April 2, 2000	1	2:26	Kadoma, Osaka, Japan	
Loss	2–3–1	Takuya Wada	Decision (majority)	Shooto: Renaxis 2	July 16, 1999	2	5:00	Tokyo, Japan	
Win	2–2–1	Takayuki Okochi	Decision (unanimous)	Shooto: Shooter's Passion	May 27, 1999	2	5:00	Setagaya, Tokyo, Japan	
Draw	1–2–1	Takaharu Murahama	Draw	Shooto: Las Grandes Viajes 6	November 27, 1998	2	5:00	Tokyo, Japan	
Loss	1–2	Hiroyuki Kojima	Decision (unanimous)	Shooto: Las Grandes Viajes 5	August 29, 1998	2	5:00	Tokyo, Japan	
Win	1–1	Isao Tanimura	Decision (unanimous)	Shooto: Gig '98 1st	April 10, 1998	2	5:00	Tokyo, Japan	
Loss	0–1	Sanae Kikuta	Submission (keylock)	Lumax Cup: Tournament of J '96	March 30, 1996	1	2:04	Japan	

== See also ==
- List of male mixed martial artists
