= Ricardo Botelho =

Brazilian mixed martial arts fighter

- Born: Brazil
- Other names: Ricky
- Nationality: Brazilian
- Height: 5 ft 8 in (1.73 m)
- Weight: 152 lb (69 kg; 10.9 st)
- Division: Lightweight
- Years active: 1996 - 1998

Mixed martial arts record
- Total: 5
- Wins: 3
- By submission: 1
- By decision: 2
- Losses: 2
- By knockout: 1
- By submission: 1

Other information
- Mixed martial arts record from Sherdog

Ricardo Botelho is a Brazilian mixed martial artist. He competed in the Lightweight division.

== Mixed martial arts record ==
Professional record breakdown
5 matches	3 wins	2 losses
By knockout	0	1
By submission	1	1
By decision	2	0

Res.	Record	Opponent	Method	Event	Date	Round	Time	Location	Notes
Loss	3-2	Caol Uno	TKO (submission to punches)	VTJ 1998: Vale Tudo Japan 1998	25 October 1998	3	2:03	Urayasu, Chiba, Japan	
Win	3-1	Joel Gerson	Decision (split)	Shooto: Las Grandes Viajes 5	29 August 1998	3	5:00	Tokyo, Japan	
Win	2-1	Masato Fujiwara	Decision (unanimous)	Shooto: Las Grandes Viajes 1	17 January 1998	3	5:00	Tokyo, Japan	
Loss	1-1	Rumina Sato	Submission (heel hook)	Shooto: Reconquista 1	18 January 1997	3	1:24	Tokyo, Japan	
Win	1-0	Cristiano Franca	Submission (rear naked choke)	UVF 4: Universal Vale Tudo Fighting 4	22 October 1996	1	3:58	Brazil	

== See also ==
- List of male mixed martial artists
