= Hisao Ikeda =

Japanese mixed martial artist

Hisao Ikeda 池田久雄
- Born: Japan
- Nationality: Japanese
- Height: 5 ft 6 in (1.68 m)
- Weight: 132 lb (60 kg; 9.4 st)
- Division: Bantamweight; Featherweight
- Team: Purebred Omiya
- Years active: 1996 - 2002

Mixed martial arts record
- Total: 18
- Wins: 10
- By knockout: 1
- By submission: 2
- By decision: 7
- Losses: 5
- By knockout: 2
- By decision: 3
- Draws: 3

Other information
- Mixed martial arts record from Sherdog

Hisao Ikeda (Japanese: 池田久雄) is a Japanese mixed martial artist. He competed in the Bantamweight and Featherweight division.

== Mixed martial arts record ==
Professional record breakdown
18 matches	10 wins	5 losses
By knockout	1	2
By submission	2	0
By decision	7	3
Draws	3	

Res.	Record	Opponent	Method	Event	Date	Round	Time	Location	Notes
Loss	10-5-3	Masato Shiozawa	TKO (punches)	Shooto: Year End Show 2002	December 14, 2002	3	4:14	Urayasu, Chiba, Japan	
Draw	10-4-3	Masahiro Oishi	Draw	Shooto: Treasure Hunt 10	September 16, 2002	3	5:00	Yokohama, Kanagawa, Japan	
Win	10-4-2	Hiroaki Yoshioka	Decision (unanimous)	Shooto: Treasure Hunt 1	January 12, 2002	3	5:00	Tokyo, Japan	
Win	9-4-2	Ichaku Murata	Decision (unanimous)	Shooto: Gig East 7	November 26, 2001	3	5:00	Tokyo, Japan	
Loss	8-4-2	Katsuya Toida	Decision (unanimous)	Shooto: To The Top 1	January 19, 2001	3	5:00	Tokyo, Japan	
Draw	8-3-2	Joao Roque	Draw	VTJ 1999: Vale Tudo Japan 1999	December 11, 1999	3	8:00		
Loss	8-3-1	Uchu Tatsumi	Decision (split)	Shooto: Renaxis 4	September 5, 1999	3	5:00	Tokyo, Japan	
Win	8-2-1	Colin Mannsur	TKO (punches)	Shooto: Las Grandes Viajes 6	November 27, 1998	2	1:49	Tokyo, Japan	
Win	7-2-1	Mamoru Okochi	Decision (unanimous)	Shooto: Gig '98 2nd	July 18, 1998	3	5:00	Tokyo, Japan	
Win	6-2-1	Omar Salvosa	Submission (achilles lock)	Shooto: Las Grandes Viajes 2	March 1, 1998	1	4:23	Tokyo, Japan	
Win	5-2-1	Jin Akimoto	Decision (unanimous)	Shooto: Las Grandes Viajes 1	January 17, 1998	3	5:00	Tokyo, Japan	
Win	4-2-1	Masahiro Oishi	Decision (unanimous)	Shooto: Reconquista 3	August 27, 1997	2	5:00	Tokyo, Japan	
Loss	3-2-1	Jin Akimoto	Decision (majority)	Shooto: Reconquista 1	January 18, 1997	3	3:00	Tokyo, Japan	
Win	3-1-1	Kenzi Daikanyama	Decision (majority)	Shooto: Let's Get Lost	October 4, 1996	3	3:00	Tokyo, Japan	
Win	2-1-1	Katsuhisa Akasaki	Decision (majority)	Shooto: Free Fight Kawasaki	July 28, 1996	3	3:00	Kawasaki, Kanagawa, Japan	
Loss	1-1-1	Uchu Tatsumi	KO (punches)	Shooto: Vale Tudo Junction 3	May 7, 1996	1	0:47	Tokyo, Japan	
Draw	1-0-1	Masahiro Oishi	Draw	Shooto: Vale Tudo Junction 2	March 5, 1996	3	3:00	Tokyo, Japan	
Win	1-0	Yoshiyuki Takayama	Submission (kimura)	Shooto: Vale Tudo Junction 1	January 20, 1996	3	2:57	Tokyo, Japan	

== See also ==
- List of male mixed martial artists
