= Yoshinobu Ota =

Japanese mixed martial artist

Yoshinobu Ota 太田義信
- Born: November 13, 1972 (age 53); Japan
- Nationality: Japanese
- Height: 5 ft 5 in (1.65 m)
- Weight: 143 lb (65 kg; 10.2 st)
- Division: Featherweight
- Team: Shiou-Juku
- Years active: 1999 - 2003

Mixed martial arts record
- Total: 13
- Wins: 4
- By submission: 2
- By decision: 2
- Losses: 6
- By knockout: 1
- By submission: 3
- By decision: 2
- Draws: 3

Other information
- Mixed martial arts record from Sherdog

Yoshinobu Ota Japanese: 太田義信 (born November 13, 1972) is a Japanese mixed martial artist. He competed in the Featherweight division.

== Mixed martial arts record ==
Professional record breakdown
13 matches	4 wins	6 losses
By knockout	0	1
By submission	2	3
By decision	2	2
Draws	3	

Res.	Record	Opponent	Method	Event	Date	Round	Time	Location	Notes
Loss	4-6-3	Seiji Ozuka	Submission (Straight Armbar)	GCM: Demolition 031227	December 27, 2003	1	1:40	Tokyo, Japan	
Draw	4-5-3	Daichi Fujiwara	Draw	Pancrase: Hybrid 8	October 4, 2003	2	5:00	Osaka, Osaka, Japan	
Loss	4-5-2	Miki Shida	Decision (Unanimous)	Pancrase: Hybrid 6	June 7, 2003	2	5:00	Tokyo, Japan	
Draw	4-4-2	Miki Shida	Draw (Unanimous)	Pancrase: Spirit 6	August 25, 2002	2	5:00	Osaka, Osaka, Japan	
Win	4-4-1	Noriyuki Takeuchi	Submission (Guillotine Choke)	Deep: clubDeep Ozon	July 14, 2002	1	0:42	Nagoya	
Loss	3-4-1	Naoyuki Kotani	Technical Submission (Rear-Naked Choke)	Rings: World Title Series Grand Final	February 15, 2002	1	1:41	Kanagawa, Japan	
Draw	3-3-1	Takumi Yano	Draw	Pancrase: Proof 5	August 25, 2001	2	5:00	Osaka, Osaka, Japan	
Loss	3-3	Masahiro Oishi	Submission (Rear Naked Choke)	Shooto: To The Top 2	March 2, 2001	2	2:48	Tokyo, Japan	
Loss	3-2	Mamoru Yamaguchi	KO (Knee)	Shooto: R.E.A.D. 9	August 27, 2000	3	2:21	Yokohama, Kanagawa, Japan	
Win	3-1	Norio Nishiyama	Technical Submission (Rear-Naked Choke)	Shooto: R.E.A.D. 2	March 17, 2000	1	0:28	Tokyo, Japan	
Loss	2-1	Jin Akimoto	Decision (Unanimous)	Shooto: Gateway to the Extremes	November 4, 1999	2	5:00	Setagaya, Tokyo, Japan	
Win	2-0	Norio Nishiyama	Decision (Unanimous)	Shooto: Renaxis 3	August 4, 1999	2	5:00	Setagaya, Tokyo, Japan	
Win	1-0	Hiroaki Yoshioka	Decision (Majority)	Shooto: Shooter's Soul	January 27, 1999	2	5:00	Setagaya, Tokyo, Japan	

== See also ==
- List of male mixed martial artists
