= 1997 in Shooto =

Mixed martial arts events

Information
- First date: January 18, 1997
- Last date: October 12, 1997

Events
- Total events: 5

Fights
- Total fights: 38
- Title fights: 1

Chronology
1996 in Shooto	1997 in Shooto	1998 in Shooto

The year 1997 is the 9th year in the history of Shooto, a mixed martial arts promotion based in the Japan. In 1997 Shooto held 5 events beginning with, Shooto: Reconquista 1.

== Title fights ==
Title fights in 1997
Weight class				Method	Round	Time	Event	Notes
Heavyweight	Enson Inoue	def.	Joe Estes	Submission (Punches)	1	1:06	Shooto: Reconquista 4	(Note: For the Heavyweight Champion.)

== Events list ==
#	Event title	Date	Arena	Location
47	Shooto: Reconquista 4	October 12, 1997	Korakuen Hall	Tokyo, Japan
46	Shooto: Reconquista 3	August 27, 1997	Korakuen Hall	Tokyo, Japan
45	Shooto: Gig	June 25, 1997	Kitazawa Town Hall	Tokyo, Japan
44	Shooto: Reconquista 2	April 6, 1997	Korakuen Hall	Tokyo, Japan
43	Shooto: Reconquista 1	January 18, 1997	Korakuen Hall	Tokyo, Japan

== Shooto: Reconquista 1 ==
Shooto: Reconquista 1 was an event held on January 18, 1997, at Korakuen Hall in Tokyo, Japan.

=== Results ===
Main Card
Weight class				Method	Round	Time	Notes
	Rumina Sato	def.	Ricardo Botelho	Submission (Heel Hook)	3	1:24
	Erik Paulson	def.	Stuart Harrison	Submission (Armbar)	2	2:28
	Uchu Tatsumi	def.	Mamoru Okochi	Decision (Unanimous)	5	3:00
	Akihiro Gono	def.	Masato Fujiwara	Decision (Unanimous)	4	3:00
	Hayato Sakurai	vs.	Takuya Kuwabara	Draw	3	3:00
	Ron Balicki	def.	Tomoaki Hayama	Decision (Unanimous)	3	3:00
	Jin Akimoto	def.	Hisao Ikeda	Decision (Majority)	3	3:00
	Hiroyuki Kojima	def.	Yuji Fujita	Decision (Unanimous)	3	3:00
	Yoshiyuki Takayama	def.	Ed Wedding	Decision (Unanimous)	3	3:00

== Shooto: Reconquista 2 ==
Shooto: Reconquista 2 was an event held on April 6, 1997, at Korakuen Hall in Tokyo, Japan.

=== Results ===
Main Card
Weight class				Method	Round	Time	Notes
	Enson Inoue	def.	Casemiro Nascimento Martins	TKO (Elbows)	1	0:45
	Rumina Sato	def.	Ali Mihoubi	Submission (Heel Hook)	1	2:21
	Uchu Tatsumi	def.	Abdelaziz Cherigui	Submission (Punches)	1	2:18
	Kazuhiro Kusayanagi	vs.	Masato Fujiwara	Draw	3	5:00
	Katsuhisa Fujii	def.	Daniel Quonian	TKO (Punches)	1	0:44
	Mitsuhiro Sakamoto	def.	Masaru Gokita	Decision (Majority)	2	5:00
	Tetsuji Kato	def.	Hiroyuki Kojima	Decision (Unanimous)	2	5:00
	Mohammad Jarban	def.	Yuji Fujita	Decision (Unanimous)	2	5:00

== Shooto: Gig ==
Shooto: Gig was an event held on June 25, 1997, at Kitazawa Town Hall in Tokyo, Japan.

=== Results ===
Main Card
Weight class				Method	Round	Time	Notes
	Jutaro Nakao	vs.	Akihiro Gono	Draw	3	5:00
	Tetsuji Kato	def.	Masato Fujiwara	Decision (Unanimous)	2	5:00
	Masahiro Oishi	def.	Yoshiyuki Takayama	Decision (Unanimous)	2	5:00
	Hayato Sakurai	def.	Hiroyuki Kojima	Decision (Unanimous)	2	5:00
	Kimihito Nonaka	def.	Kenzi Daikanyama	Decision (Unanimous)	2	5:00
	Caol Uno	def.	Yuzo Tateishi	Submission (Rear Naked Choke)	1	2:14

== Shooto: Reconquista 3 ==
Shooto: Reconquista 3 was an event held on August 27, 1997, at Korakuen Hall in Tokyo, Japan.

=== Results ===
Main Card
Weight class				Method	Round	Time	Notes
	Rumina Sato	def.	Alan Fried	Submission (Armbar)	1	0:59
	Paul Jones	def.	Erik Paulson	Decision (Majority)	3	5:00
	Hayato Sakurai	def.	Ali Elias	Submission (Armbar)	1	1:23
	Masanori Suda	def.	Kazuhiro Kusayanagi	Decision (Unanimous)	3	5:00
	Jutaro Nakao	def.	Tetsuji Kato	Submission (Armbar)	3	4:56
	Hisao Ikeda	def.	Masahiro Oishi	Decision (Unanimous)	2	5:00
	Kimihito Nonaka	def.	Jin Akimoto	Decision (Majority)	2	5:00

== Shooto: Reconquista 4 ==
Shooto: Reconquista 4 was an event held on October 12, 1997, at Korakuen Hall in Tokyo, Japan.

=== Results ===
Main Card
Weight class				Method	Round	Time	Notes
Heavyweight	Enson Inoue	def.	Joe Estes	Submission (Punches)	1	1:06	(Note: For The Heavyweight Champion.)
	Rumina Sato	def.	Maurice Corty	Submission (Kimura)	1	2:01
	Hayato Sakurai	def.	Alex Cook	Submission (Rear Naked Choke)	1	1:09
	Uchu Tatsumi	def.	Paul Coonin	Submission (Heel Hook)	1	1:19
	Larry Papadopoulos	def.	Akihiro Gono	Decision (Split)	3	5:00
	Todd Bjornethun	def.	Kazuhiro Kusayanagi	TKO (Punches)	2	4:01
	Takuya Kuwabara	vs.	Caol Uno	Draw	2	5:00
	Takenori Ito	def.	Naoto Kojima	Decision (Majority)	2	5:00

== See also ==
- Shooto
- List of Shooto champions
- List of Shooto Events
