= Jin Akimoto =

American mixed martial artist

- Born: April 7, 1971 (age 55); Sagamihara, Kanagawa, Japan
- Native name: 秋本 じん
- Nationality: Japanese
- Height: 5 ft 6 in (1.68 m)
- Weight: 123 lb (56 kg; 8.8 st)
- Division: Bantamweight; Flyweight
- Fighting out of: Sagamihara, Kanagawa, Japan
- Team: K'z Factory; Akimoto Dojo Jungle Junction
- Years active: 1995 - 2010

Mixed martial arts record
- Total: 29
- Wins: 12
- By knockout: 1
- By submission: 6
- By decision: 5
- Losses: 13
- By submission: 1
- By decision: 12
- Draws: 4

Other information
- Mixed martial arts record from Sherdog

Jin Akimoto (Japanese: 秋本 じん; born April 7, 1971) is a retired Japanese mixed martial artist. He competed in the Bantamweight and Flyweight divisions. He spent the entirety of his career, barring one fight, in Shooto. Between 2000 and 2004 he was ranked as one of the best bantamweights in the world.

== Personal life ==
Jin Akimoto was born in Sagamihara, in the Kanagawa Prefecture of Japan. He is the youngest of three siblings, with an older brother and sister. He graduated from Kanagawa Prefectural Yaei Higashi High School. He moved to Tokyo, where he graduated from Kyorin University. After retiring from martial arts, he pursued a career in politics, as well as opening his own gym.

== Martial arts career ==
Akimoto made his debut in 1995 during Shooto - Vale Tudo Access 4 against Kazuyoshi Kudo, whom he beat by rear naked choke. He would achieve two more submission wins over Masataka Kawakami and Yoshinori Haraigawa.

He would then draw against Mitsuhiro Sakamoto. In a rematch he lost a majority decision. In his next fights he accumulated a 2-3-1 record, all decisions. His 5-3-2 record earned him a bantamweight title fight against Mamoru Yamaguchi. He lost a majority decision.

Bouncing back, he fought Yoshinobu Ota and won a unanimous decision and an armbar win against Greg Piper. In a rematch against Mamoru Yamaguchi during Shooto: R.E.A.D. Final he lost a unanimous decision.

Akimoto bounced back with unanimous decision wins over Hiroaki Yoshioka and Takeyasu Hirono, as well as a kneebar win over Alfonso Alcarez and a TKO win over Tomoyuki Tachi.

He subsequently lost his next six fights He then drew twice against Junji Ikoma, and lost against Ryuichi Miki and Ayumu Shioda. Akimoto failed to win a single fight during this five year period, with a record of 0-8-2. He would retire on a win, beating Kenji Hosoya with a guillotine choke during Shooto: Gig Tokyo 4.

== Mixed martial arts record ==
Professional record breakdown
| 29 matches | 12 wins | 13 losses |
| By knockout | 1 | 0 |
| By submission | 6 | 1 |
| By decision | 5 | 12 |
| Draws | 4 | |

| Res. | Record | Opponent | Method | Event | Date | Round | Time | Location | Notes |
|---|---|---|---|---|---|---|---|---|---|
| Win | 12-13-4 | Kenji Hosoya | Submission (guillotine choke) | Shooto: Gig Tokyo 4 | April 24, 2010 | 1 | 2:46 | Shinjuku Face | Tokyo, Japan |
| Loss | 11-13-4 | Ayumu Shioda | Decision (unanimous) | Shooto: Shooto Tradition 5 | January 18, 2009 | 2 | 5:00 | Differ Ariake Arena | Tokyo, Japan |
| Loss | 11-12-4 | Ryuichi Miki | Decision (majority) | Shooto: Shooting Disco 6: Glory Shines In You | October 5, 2008 | 3 | 5:00 | Shinjuku Face | Tokyo, Japan |
| Draw | 11-11-4 | Junji Ikoma | Draw | Shooto: Shooting Disco 5: Earth, Wind and Fighter | June 21, 2008 | 3 | 5:00 | Shinjuku Face | Tokyo, Japan |
| Draw | 11-11-3 | Junji Ikoma | Draw | Shooto: Back To Our Roots 7 | January 26, 2008 | 3 | 5:00 | Korakuen Hall | Tokyo, Japan |
| Loss | 11-11-2 | Setsu Iguchi | Decision (majority) | Shooto: Back To Our Roots 5 | September 22, 2007 | 3 | 5:00 | Korakuen Hall | Tokyo, Japan |
| Loss | 11-10-2 | Tetsu Suzuki | Decision (unanimous) | Shooto: Rookie Tournament Final | December 2, 2006 | 2 | 5:00 | Shinjuku Face | Tokyo, Japan |
| Loss | 11-9-2 | Masahiro Oishi | Technical Submission (armbar) | Shooto 2005: 7/30 in Korakuen Hall | July 30, 2005 | 1 | 3:14 | Korakuen Hall | Tokyo, Japan |
| Loss | 11-8-2 | Kenji Osawa | Decision (majority) | Shooto: 5/4 in Korakuen Hall | May 4, 2005 | 2 | 5:00 | Korakuen Hall | Tokyo, Japan |
| Loss | 11-7-2 | Marcos Galvao | Decision (unanimous) | Shooto: 9/26 in Kourakuen Hall | September 26, 2004 | 3 | 5:00 | Korakuen Hall | Tokyo, Japan |
| Loss | 11-6-2 | Kentaro Imaizumi | Decision (unanimous) | Shooto 2004: 5/3 in Korakuen Hall | May 3, 2004 | 3 | 5:00 | Korakuen Hall | Tokyo, Japan |
| Win | 11-5-2 | Tomoyuki Tachi | TKO (punches) | Kingdom Ehrgeiz: Tokyo University Flight | December 13, 2003 | 1 | 2:41 | Excitement Space Z-Zone | Tokyo, Japan |
| Win | 10-5-2 | Alfonso Alcarez | Submission (kneebar) | Shooto: Treasure Hunt 6 | May 5, 2002 | 1 | 0:22 | Korakuen Hall | Tokyo, Japan |
| Win | 9-5-2 | Takeyasu Hirono | Decision (unanimous) | Shooto: To The Top 8 | September 2, 2001 | 3 | 5:00 | Korakuen Hall | Tokyo, Japan |
| Win | 8-5-2 | Hiroaki Yoshioka | Decision (unanimous) | Shooto: To The Top 3 | March 21, 2001 | 3 | 5:00 | Kitazawa Town Hall | Setagaya, Tokyo, Japan |
| Loss | 7-5-2 | Mamoru Yamaguchi | Decision (unanimous) | Shooto: R.E.A.D. Final | December 17, 2000 | 3 | 5:00 | Tokyo Bay NK Hall | Urayasu, Chiba, Japan |
| Win | 7-4-2 | Greg Piper | Submission (armbar) | Shooto: R.E.A.D. 4 | April 12, 2000 | 1 | 2:29 | Kitazawa Town Hall | Setagaya, Tokyo, Japan |
| Win | 6-4-2 | Yoshinobu Ota | Decision (unanimous) | Shooto: Gateway to the Extremes | November 4, 1999 | 2 | 5:00 | Kitazawa Town Hall | Setagaya, Tokyo, Japan |
| Loss | 5-4-2 | Mamoru Yamaguchi | Decision (majority) | Shooto: Renaxis 4 | September 5, 1999 | 2 | 5:00 | Korakuen Hall | Tokyo, Japan |
| Draw | 5-3-2 | Takeyasu Hirono | Draw | Shooto: Gig '99 | April 9, 1999 | 2 | 5:00 | Kitazawa Town Hall | Tokyo, Japan |
| Win | 5-3-1 | Masaru Gokita | Decision (majority) | Shooto: Las Grandes Viajes 5 | August 29, 1998 | 2 | 5:00 | Korakuen Hall | Tokyo, Japan |
| Loss | 4-3-1 | Hisao Ikeda | Decision (unanimous) | Shooto: Las Grandes Viajes 1 | January 17, 1998 | 3 | 5:00 | Korakuen Hall | Tokyo, Japan |
| Loss | 4-2-1 | Kimihito Nonaka | Decision (majority) | Shooto: Reconquista 3 | August 27, 1997 | 2 | 5:00 | Korakuen Hall | Tokyo, Japan |
| Win | 4-1-1 | Hisao Ikeda | Decision (majority) | Shooto: Reconquista 1 | January 18, 1997 | 3 | 3:00 | Korakuen Hall | Tokyo, Japan |
| Loss | 3-1-1 | Mitsuhiro Sakamoto | Decision (majority) | Shooto: Let's Get Lost | October 4, 1996 | 3 | 3:00 | Korakuen Hall | Tokyo, Japan |
| Draw | 3-0-1 | Mitsuhiro Sakamoto | Draw | Shooto: Vale Tudo Junction 3 | May 7, 1996 | 3 | 3:00 | Korakuen Hall | Tokyo, Japan |
| Win | 3-0 | Yoshinori Haraigawa | Technical Submission (rear-naked choke) | Shooto: Vale Tudo Junction 2 | March 5, 1996 | 1 | 1:42 | Korakuen Hall | Tokyo, Japan |
| Win | 2-0 | Masataka Kawakami | Submission (rear naked choke) | Shooto: Yokohama Free Fight | June 4, 1995 | 1 | 2:32 | | Japan |
| Win | 1-0 | Kazuyoshi Kudo | Submission (rear naked choke) | Shooto: Vale Tudo Access 4 | May 12, 1995 | 1 | 0:56 | | Japan |

== See also ==
- List of male mixed martial artists
