= Hiroyuki Abe (fighter) =

Japanese Mixed Martial Artist, Head Coach AACC

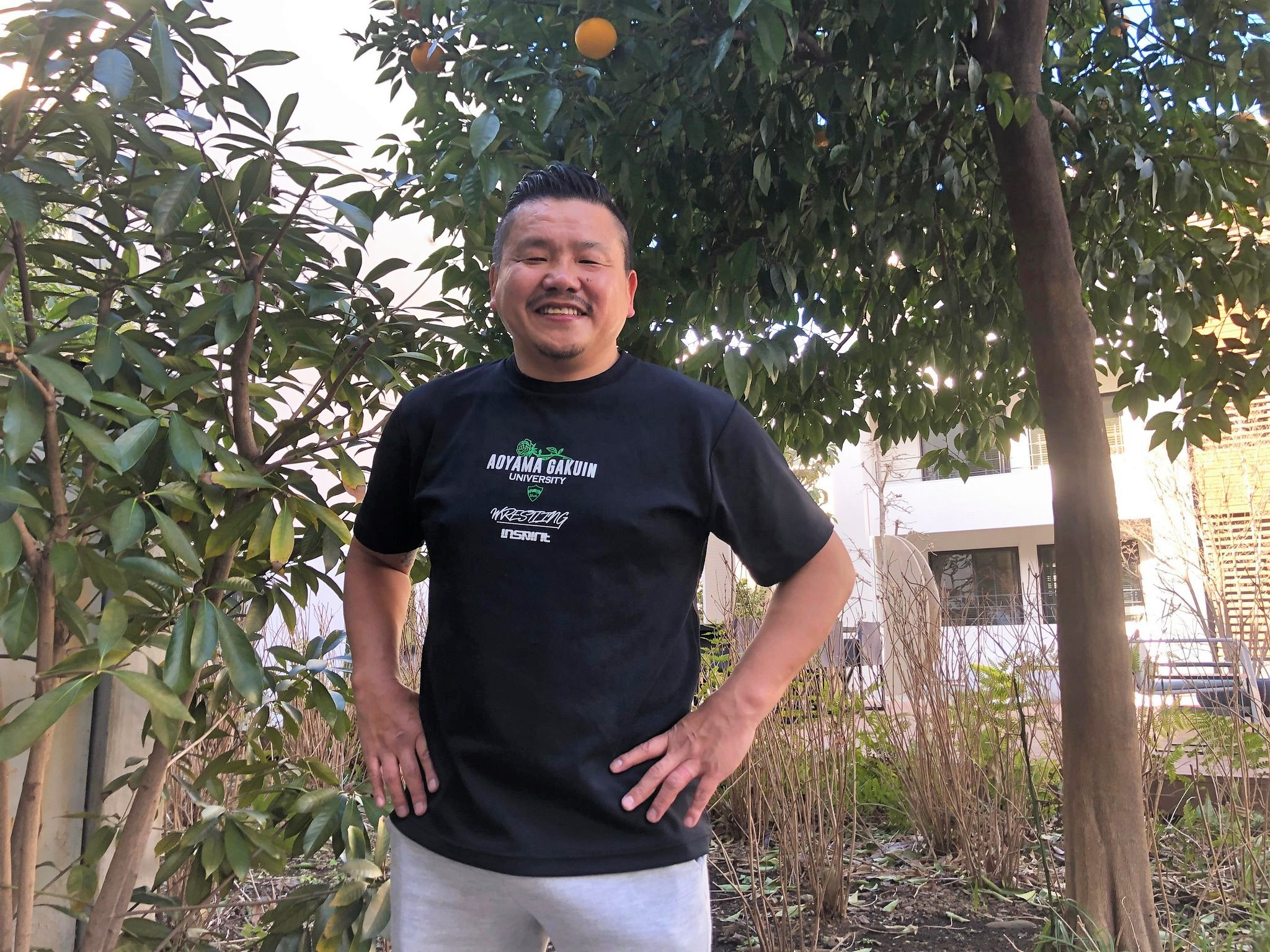
- Born: Abe Hiroyuki; February 9, 1970 (age 56); Ichinomiya, Aichi, Japan
- Native name: 阿部 裕幸
- Other names: Abe Ani
- Nationality: Japanese
- Height: 5 ft 6 in (168 cm)
- Weight: 143 lb (65 kg; 10 st 3 lb)
- Division: Featherweight
- Style: Wrestling, Sambo, Brazilian Jiu-Jitsu, Judo, Karate, Shootfighting
- Team: AACC
- Rank: Black belt in Brazilian Jiu-Jitsu; Black belt in Judo; Black belt in Karate
- Years active: 1998–2012

Mixed martial arts record
- Total: 27
- Wins: 8
- By knockout: 2
- By submission: 3
- By decision: 3
- Losses: 15
- By knockout: 7
- By submission: 5
- By decision: 3
- Draws: 3
- No contests: 1

Other information
- Notable students: Megumi Fujii, Yasuko Tamada, Hitomi Akano
- Mixed martial arts record from Sherdog

Hiroyuki Abe (Japanese: 阿部裕幸, Abe Hiroyuki; born February 9, 1970), also known as Abe Ani, is a Japanese mixed martial artist currently fighting in the featherweight division for Shooto as well as teaching at his gym, Abe Ani Combat Club. Abe is most notable for training female mixed martial arts veteran and Bellator Fighting Championships finalist, Megumi Fujii.

Abe has fought in many high-level MMA organizations, including Shooto, Pride FC, Deep, King of the Cage and Cage Rage. He has also competed at ADCC. He holds notable bouts against UFC standouts Urijah Faber and Brad Pickett, as well as Pride veteran Luiz Firmino.

He made his return to Shooto after 5 years on September 30, 2012, vs. Shigeki Osawa. He lost the bout via TKO.

== Mixed martial arts record ==
Professional record breakdown
27 matches	8 wins	15 losses
By knockout	2	7
By submission	3	5
By decision	3	3
Draws	3	
No contests	1	

Res.	Record	Opponent	Method	Event	Date	Round	Time	Location	Notes
Loss	8–16–3 (1)	Mitsuhisa Sunabe	Decision (split)	Pancrase 271: 5th Round	October 31, 2015	1	4:12	Tokyo, Japan	
Loss	8–15–3 (1)	Shigeki Osawa	TKO (punches)	Shooto: 10th Round	September 30, 2012	1	4:12	Tokyo, Japan	
Win	8–14–3 (1)	Atsuhiro Tsuboi	Decision (unanimous)	Deep: Cage Impact 2011 in Nagoya	July 10, 2011	2	5:00	Nagoya, Japan	
Loss	7–14–3 (1)	Artiom Damkovsky	Decision (unanimous)	Bushido FC: Legends	November 18, 2009	2	5:00	St. Petersburg, Russia	
Loss	7–13–3 (1)	Masakazu Imanari	Submission (toe hold)	Deep: 32 Impact	October 9, 2007	3	4:32	Tokyo, Japan	
Loss	7–12–3 (1)	Sami Aziz	KO (punches)	Bodog Fight: Vancouver	August 25, 2007	1	2:31	Vancouver, British Columbia, Canada	
Loss	7–11–3 (1)	Takeshi Inoue	KO (punch)	Shooto: Back To Our Roots 1	February 17, 2007	1	4:05	Yokohama, Japan	
Draw	7–10–3 (1)	Naoki Matsushita	Draw	Pride - Bushido 12	August 26, 2006	2	5:00	Nagoya, Japan	
Loss	7–10–2 (1)	Fabricio Monteiro	Submission (toe hold)	Deep: clubDeep Tokyo	July 8, 2006	2	1:53	Tokyo, Japan	
Win	7–9–2 (1)	David Padilla	Submission (armbar)	Shooto: The Devilock	May 12, 2006	1	3:15	Tokyo, Japan	
Loss	6–9–2 (1)	Brad Pickett	Decision (unanimous)	Cage Rage 16	April 22, 2006	3	5:00	London, England	
Loss	6–8–2 (1)	Tenkei Oda	Decision (unanimous)	Shooto: The Victory of the Truth	February 17, 2006	3	5:00	Tokyo, Japan	
Win	6–7–2 (1)	Joey Brown	Submission (heel hook)	Euphoria: USA vs. Japan	November 5, 2005	1	1:40	Atlantic City, New Jersey, United States	
Loss	5–7–2 (1)	Urijah Faber	TKO (cut)	KOTC: Mortal Sins	May 7, 2005	3	2:37	Primm, Nevada, United States	For the KOTC Bantamweight Championship.
Loss	5–6–2 (1)	Ryan Schultz	TKO (punches)	Euphoria: USA vs. World	February 26, 2005	2	0:42	Atlantic City, New Jersey, United States	
Loss	5–5–2 (1)	Makoto Ishikawa	TKO (cut)	Shooto: Year End Show 2004	December 14, 2004	3	0:40	Tokyo, Japan	
NC	5–4–2 (1)	Russ Miura	No Contest	KOTC 44: Revenge	November 14, 2004	1	2:29	San Jacinto, California, United States	
Loss	5–4–2	Luiz Firmino	Submission (arm-triangle choke)	Pride Bushido 4	July 19, 2004	1	2:52	Nagoya, Japan	
Loss	5–3–2	João Roque	Submission (armbar)	Shooto: Gig Central 4	September 21, 2003	2	4:59	Nagoya, Japan	
Loss	5–2–2	Alexandre Franca Nogueira	Submission (rear-naked choke)	Shooto: Year End Show 2002	December 14, 2002	1	3:53	Urayasu, Japan	
Win	5–1–2	Alexandre Franca Nogueira	KO (punch)	Shooto: Treasure Hunt 8	July 19, 2002	1	4:37	Tokyo, Japan	
Draw	4–1–2	Baret Yoshida	Draw	Shooto: Treasure Hunt 5	March 15, 2002	3	5:00	Tokyo, Japan	
Win	4–1–1	Kazuhiro Inoue	TKO (doctor stoppage)	Shooto: To The Top 10	November 25, 2001	1	4:00	Tokyo, Japan	
Loss	3–1–1	Stephen Palling	KO (punches)	Shooto: R.E.A.D. 10	September 15, 2000	2	2:23	Tokyo, Japan	
Win	3–0–1	Kimihito Nonaka	Decision (unanimous)	Shooto: R.E.A.D. 5	May 22, 2000	2	5:00	Tokyo, Japan	
Draw	2–0–1	Masahiro Oishi	Draw	Shooto: Renaxis 4	September 5, 1999	2	5:00	Tokyo, Japan	
Win	2–0	Yoshiyuki Takayama	Decision (unanimous)	Shooto: 10th Anniversary Event	May 29, 1999	2	5:00	Yokohama, Japan	
Win	1–0	Andrew Kerr	Submission (armbar)	Greatest Common Multiple Vale Tudo	August 29, 1998	2	2:22	Japan	
