= Kazumichi Takada =

Japanese mixed martial artist

- Born: Japan
- Nationality: Japanese
- Weight: 154 lb (70 kg; 11.0 st)
- Division: Lightweight
- Team: Ugokai; Wild Phoenix
- Years active: 1998 - 2001

Mixed martial arts record
- Total: 8
- Wins: 3
- By submission: 1
- By decision: 2
- Losses: 4
- By knockout: 1
- By submission: 1
- By decision: 2
- Draws: 1

Other information
- Mixed martial arts record from Sherdog

Kazumichi Takada is a Japanese mixed martial artist. He competed in the Lightweight division.

== Mixed martial arts record ==
Professional record breakdown
8 matches	3 wins	4 losses
By knockout	0	1
By submission	1	1
By decision	2	2
Draws	1	

Res.	Record	Opponent	Method	Event	Date	Round	Time	Location	Notes
Loss	3–4–1	Tatsuya Kawajiri	Technical Submission (triangle armbar)	Shooto: To The Top 9	September 27, 2001	1	3:03	Tokyo, Japan	
Win	3–3–1	Masato Ogura	Submission (rear-naked choke)	Shooto: Wanna Shooto 2001	April 8, 2001	1	4:35	Setagaya, Tokyo, Japan	
Loss	2–3–1	Yohei Suzuki	Decision (unanimous)	Shooto: R.E.A.D. 6	July 16, 2000	2	5:00	Tokyo, Japan	
Loss	2–2–1	Makoto Ishikawa	Decision (unanimous)	Shooto: R.E.A.D. 4	April 12, 2000	2	5:00	Setagaya, Tokyo, Japan	
Loss	2–1–1	Takanori Gomi	TKO (punches)	Shooto: Devilock Fighters	January 15, 1999	2	3:42	Tokyo, Japan	
Draw	2–0–1	Takenori Ito	Draw	Shooto: Las Grandes Viajes 5	August 29, 1998	2	5:00	Tokyo, Japan	
Win	2–0	Hiroki Kotani	Decision (majority)	Shooto: Las Grandes Viajes 3	May 13, 1998	2	5:00	Tokyo, Japan	
Win	1–0	Satoshi Fujisaki	Decision (unanimous)	Shooto: Gig '98 1st	April 10, 1998	2	5:00	Tokyo, Japan	

== See also ==
- List of male mixed martial artists
