= List of male mixed martial artists =

This is a list of notable professional male mixed martial arts fighters in alphabetical order.

== A ==
- (United States) Tank Abbott (UFC, Pride, Strikeforce)
- (Egypt) Hamdy Abdelwahab (UFC)
- (Kyrgyzstan) Akbar Abdullaev (UFC, OneFC)
- (Russia) Abdul-Aziz Abdulvakhabov (ACB)
- (Russia) Shamil Abdurakhimov (UFC)
- (Japan) Daichi Abe (UFC, Pancrase)
- (Japan) Hiroyuki Abe (Shooto, KOTC, Cage Rage, DEEP, Pride)
- (Democratic Republic of the Congo) Papy Abedi (UFC, Shooto)
- (France) Cyril Abidi (K-1)
- (Brazil) Klidson Abreu (UFC, Brave CF, M-1 Global, Jungle Fight)
- (Wales) Aaron Aby (Oktagon MMA, ACB, CWFC)
- (Brazil) Daniel Acácio (Pride, M-1, Shooto, Jungle Fight, KSW)
- (Ivory Coast) Bernard Ackah (DEEP, K-1 Hero's)
- (Japan) Akihiko Adachi (Shooto)
- (Ukraine) Serhii Adamchuk (M-1)
- (United States) Juan Adams (UFC, PFL, LFA)
- (Uzbekistan) Zarrukh Adashev (UFC, Bellator)
- (Nigeria) Israel Adesanya (UFC)
- (United States) Sam Adkins (UFC)
- (Netherlands) Peter Aerts (K-1, K-1 Hero's)
- (United States) AJ Agazarm (Bellator)
- (United States) Kevin Aguilar (UFC, Bellator, LFA)
- (United States) Christian Aguilera (LFA, BAMMA)
- (Pakistan) Bashir Ahmad (OneFC)
- (Japan) Katsuhisa Akasaki (Shooto)
- (Russia) Omari Akhmedov (UFC)
- (Japan) Jin Akimoto (Shooto)
- (Japan) Yoshihiro Akiyama (K-1, K-1 Hero's, DREAM, UFC)
- (England) Mostapha Al-Turk (Cage Rage, UFC)
- (Iraq) Amir Albazi (UFC)
- (United States) John Albert (UFC)
- (Brazil) Junior Albini (UFC)
- (Sweden) Karl Albrektsson (Bellator)
- (Brazil) Ildemar Alcântara (Jungle Fight, UFC)
- (Brazil) Iuri Alcântara (Jungle Fight, WEC, UFC)
- (Mexico) Hector Aldana (UFC)
- (Brazil) José Aldo (Shooto, Jungle Fight, Pancrase, WEC, UFC)
- (United States) Jim Alers (UFC, CWFC)
- (Canada) John Alessio (DREAM, KOTC, Pancrase, PRIDE, UFC, WEC, MFC, TPF, Bellator)
- (United States) Houston Alexander (Adrenaline MMA, KSW, UFC, Bellator, OneFC)
- (Brazil) Cosmo Alexandre (Bellator, OneFC)
- (United States) Bill Algeo (UFC)
- (United States) Royce Alger (UFC)
- (Ghana) Abdul Razak Alhassan (UFC)
- (Iran) Amir Aliakbari (Rizin, ACB)
- (Russia) Sultan Aliev (Bellator, UFC)
- (Russia) Ikram Aliskerov (UFC, Brave CF)
- (Brazil) John Allan (UFC)
- (England) Arnold Allen (UFC)
- (United States) Brendan Allen (UFC, LFA)
- (Australia) Ben Alloway (UFC, CWFC)
- (Kazakhstan) Asu Almabayev (UFC)
- (Brazil) César Almeida (UFC)
- (Brazil) Jailton Almeida (UFC)
- (Brazil) Ricardo Almeida (Pancrase, PRIDE, UFC)
- (Brazil) Thomas Almeida (UFC, Legacy)
- (United States) Eddie Alvarez (OneFC, UFC, Bellator, DREAM, EliteXC, ShoXC)
- (Spain) Joel Álvarez (UFC)
- (United States) Sean Alvarez (RINGS, KOTC, UFC)
- (Brazil) Marcirley Alves (LFA, Bellator, PFL)
- (Brazil) Rafael Alves (UFC)
- (Brazil) Thiago Alves (KOTC, UFC)
- (Brazil) Warlley Alves (UFC, Jungle Fight)
- (United States) Sam Alvey (KOTC, Bellator, MFC, UFC)
- (Brazil) Andre Amade (DREAM, K-1 Hero's)
- (Russia) Adlan Amagov (Strikeforce, UFC)
- (United States) Raul Amaya (Bellator)
- (United States) J. J. Ambrose (Affliction, Bellator)
- (North Macedonia) Alen Amedovski (UFC, Bellator)
- (Philippines) Hyder Amil (Bellator, LFA, UFC)
- (Finland) Makwan Amirkhani (UFC)
- (France) Karl Amoussou (Pancrase, M-1, DREAM, CWFC, Strikeforce, Bellator)
- (Senegal) Bertrand Amoussou-Guenou (PRIDE)
- (United States) Eryk Anders (UFC, LFC, Bellator)
- (United States) Corey Anderson (UFC, Bellator)
- (United States) Derek Anderson (Bellator)
- (Brazil) Fabrício Andrade (ONE)
- (Brazil) Viscardi Andrade (Jungle Fight, UFC)
- (New Zealand) Dylan Andrews (UFC)
- (Poland) Michał Andryszak (KSW, Babilon MMA, FEN MMA, ACB, CWFC, FNG)
- (United States) Reese Andy (IFL, UFC)
- (Lithuania) Julius Anglickas (Bellator, LFA)
- (Japan) Yoji Anjo (PRIDE, DEEP, UFC)
- (Russia) Magomed Ankalaev (UFC)
- (Russia) Gadzhimurad Antigulov (ACB, UFC)
- (United States) Kelly Anundson (Bellator)
- (Japan) Shinsho Anzai (UFC, Rizin)
- (Japan) Shinya Aoki (DEEP, DREAM, PRIDE, Shooto, OneFC, Bellator)
- (United States) Josh Appelt (Bellator)
- (United States) Erik Apple (KOTC, WEC, ShoXC, Strikeforce)
- (Japan) Jo Arai (Rizin, Shooto)
- (Brazil) Felipe Arantes (UFC)
- (Brazil) Igor Araujo (UFC, M-1, Shooto)
- (United States) Julio Arce (UFC)
- (United States) Juan Archuleta (Rizin, Bellator, KOTC, WSOF)
- (Belarus) Andrei Arlovski (Affliction, M-1, Strikeforce, EliteXC, UFC, OneFC, WSOF)
- (United States) Austin Arnett (UFC)
- (Brazil) Ricardo Arona (PRIDE, RINGS)
- (Germany) Chalid Arrab (K-1 Hero's, M-1, PRIDE)
- Akbarh Arreola (UWC Mexico, UFC, Pancrase)
- (Brazil) Antônio Arroyo (UFC, LFA)
- (United States) Matt Arroyo (UFC)
- (Japan) Noboru Asahi (DEEP, Shooto, VTJ)
- (Japan) Kai Asakura (UFC, Rizin)
- (Japan) Mikuru Asakura (Rizin, DEEP)
- (Japan) Ryusei Ashizawa (Rizin)
- (Russia) Askar Askarov (ACB, UFC)
- (France) Cyril Asker (UFC)
- (England) Scott Askham (UFC, KSW, BAMMA, ACB)
- (United States) Ben Askren (Bellator, OneFC, UFC)
- (Turkey) İbo Aslan (UFC)
- (England) Tom Aspinall (UFC, BAMMA)
- (Brazil) João Assis (M-1)
- (Brazil) Junior Assunção (UFC, XFC, KOTC)
- (Brazil) Raphael Assunção (WEC, UFC)
- (Russia) Bazigit Atajev (K-1 Hero's, Shooto, PRIDE, RINGS)
- (United States) Rich Attonito (KOTC, UFC)
- (Canada) Olivier Aubin-Mercier (UFC)
- (Brazil) Fernando Augusto
- (Brazil) Marcus Aurélio (KOTC, PRIDE, UFC, DREAM)
- (United States) David Avellan (WEC)
- (United States) Blas Avena (WEC, Bellator)
- (United States) Saad Awad (Bellator, Strikeforce, KOTC)
- (United States) Javy Ayala (Bellator)
- (Tunisia) Jessin Ayari (UFC)
- (Germany) Ottman Azaitar (UFC)
- (Brazil) Luiz Azeredo (Bellator, Jungle Fight, Cage Rage, PRIDE, Shooto)
- (United States) Hunter Azure (UFC, LFA)

== B ==
- (Sweden) Niklas Bäckström (UFC, CWFC)
- (United States) Seth Baczynski (UFC, IFL, TPF, XFC)
- (Afghanistan) Abdul Azim Badakhshi (Shooto, Matrix Fight Night, Super Fight League)
- (United States) Ryan Bader (KOTC, UFC, Bellator)
- (United States) Justin Baesman (KOTC, Bellator, WSOF)
- (United States) Miguel Baeza (UFC, Titan FC)
- (Russia) Ali Bagautinov (UFC)
- (Armenia) Melsik Baghdasaryan (UFC)
- (Russia) Ali Bagov (ACB)
- (Afghanistan) Siyar Bahadurzada (Shooto, Strikeforce, Sengoku, UFC)
- (Chile) Ignacio Bahamondes (LUX, UFC)
- (United States) Shamar Bailey (UFC, Strikeforce, Bellator, KOTC, M-1, XFC)
- (United States) Bryan Baker (KOTC, WEC, MFC, Bellator)
- (Cuba) Gustavo Balart (ONE, Titan FC)
- (Nigeria) Oluwale Bamgbose (UFC)
- (Poland) Marcin Bandel (UFC, Brave CF, UAE Warriors, ACA, FEN MMA)
- (Peru) Humberto Bandenay (UFC)
- (South Korea) Tae Hyun Bang (UFC, DEEP, M-1)
- (United States) Antonio Banuelos (DREAM, PFC, WEC, UFC, TPF)
- (Poland) Iwo Baraniewski (UFC, Babilon MMA)
- (Brazil) Renan Barão (Shooto, Jungle Fight, WEC, UFC)
- (United States) Bryan Barberena (UFC)
- (Brazil) Edson Barboza (UFC)
- (Brazil) Raoni Barcelos (UFC)
- (Tunisia) Mansour Barnaoui (Bellator, KSW, CWFC, BAMMA)
- (England) Luke Barnatt (BAMMA, UFC, ACB, UCMMA)
- (United States) Chris Barnett (UFC)
- (United States) Josh Barnett (Affliction, Pancrase, PRIDE, UFC, Sengoku, DREAM, Strikeforce)
- (France) David Baron (PRIDE, Shooto, CWFC, UFC)
- (United States) Phil Baroni (Cage Rage, EliteXC, PRIDE, PFC, Strikeforce, UFC, Titan FC, OneFC, Bellator)
- (Brazil) Carlos Barreto (IVC, UFC, PRIDE, RINGS, Jungle Fight, M-1)
- (England) Jason Barrett (Cage Rage)
- (Canada) Marc-André Barriault (UFC)
- (Argentina) Francisco Albano Barrio (KSW)
- (Brazil) Francimar Barroso (Shooto, UFC)
- (United States) Pat Barry (UFC)
- (Poland) Wawrzyniec Bartnik (FEN MMA, Brave CF)
- (Poland) Adrian Bartosiński (KSW, FEN MMA)
- (Peru) Enrique Barzola (UFC, PFL)
- (Afghanistan) Farid Basharat (UFC)
- (Afghanistan) Javid Basharat (UFC)
- (United States) Duane Bastress (Bellator)
- (Mongolia) Danaa Batgerel (UFC, LFC)
- (Cuba) Michel Batista (UFC, M-1, Titan FC)
- (United States) Bryan Battle (UFC)
- (France) Alan Baudot (UFC)
- (United States) Mario Bautista (UFC)
- (United States) Chris Beal (UFC)
- (United States) Rudy Bears (Bellator, Strikeforce, M-1, Titan FC)
- (United States) Johnny Bedford (UFC, Bellator, LFA)
- (United States) Chase Beebe (KOTC, WEC, DREAM, Bellator)
- (United States) Lyle Beerbohm (KOTC, ShoXC, Strikeforce, WSOF)
- (Russia) Azamat Bekoev (UFC, LFA, ACA)
- (Bosnia and Herzegovina) Mirsad Bektić (Titan FC, RFA, UFC)
- (United States) Alan Belcher (UFC, Titan FC)
- (Brazil) Vitor Belfort (Cage Rage, PRIDE, Affliction, Strikeforce, UFC)
- (Netherlands) Yousri Belgaroui (UAE Warriors, UFC)
- (Philippines) Kevin Belingon (URCC, Legend FC, OneFC)
- (United States) Joey Beltran (UFC, Bellator, KOTC, Strikeforce)
- (Mexico) Marco Beltrán (UFC, LUX)
- (United States) Joseph Benavidez (UFC, WEC, DREAM, PFC)
- (United States) Brandon Bender (Bellator)
- (Canada) Dave Beneteau (UFC, KOTC)
- (Sweden) Eddy Bengtsson (CWFC)
- Gabriel Benítez (UWC Mexico, UFC)
- (United States) Charles Bennett (KOTC, PRIDE, ShoXC, EliteXC)
- (United States) Lance Benoist (UFC)
- (United States) Ryan Benoit (MFC, UFC)
- (Canada) Steve Berger (Shooto, KOTC, UFC, Strikeforce)
- (United States) Bret Bergmark (Pancrase, Strikeforce, WEC)
- (United States) Dennis Bermudez (UFC, M-1)
- (United States) Manny Bermudez (UFC)
- (South Africa) Mike Bernardo
- (United States) Keith Berry (Bellator, Strikeforce, KOTC, WEC, ShoXC)
- (United States) Matt Bessette (Bellator)
- (United States) Noah Bey (Rizin)
- (Brazil) Alexandre Bezerra (Bellator)
- (Brazil) Rony Mariano Bezerra (UFC)
- (Canada) Arjan Bhullar (UFC)
- (Russia) Magomed Bibulatov (UFC, WSOF)
- (Sweden) David Bielkheden (PRIDE, Cage Rage, CWFC, M-1, Shooto, UFC)
- (Russia) Vitaly Bigdash (ONE, ACB)
- (United States) Bam Bam Bigelow (†)
- (United States) Anthony Birchak (UFC, Bellator, Rizin, LFA)
- (United Kingdom) Michael Bisping (Cage Rage, CWFC, UFC)
- (Brazil) Amaury Bitetti (UFC)
- (Georgia (country)) Tariel Bitsadze (RINGS)
- (United States) Todd Bjornethun (Pancrase, Shooto, VTJ)
- (Poland) Jan Blachowicz (KSW, UFC)
- (United States) Jason Black (UFC, PRIDE, WFA, KOTC)
- (United States) Brad Blackburn (IFL, MFC, UFC, Bellator)
- (Venezuela) Maximo Blanco (UFC, Strikeforce, Sengoku, Pancrase)
- (United States) Curtis Blaydes (UFC, RFA)
- (United States) Dan Bobish (KOTC, PRIDE, UFC)
- (Canada) Mark Bocek (UFC, KOTC)
- (United States) Kyle Bochniak (UFC)
- (United States) Tim Boetsch (UFC, KOTC, IFL)
- (United States) Jerry Bohlander (KOTC, UFC)
- (South Korea) Kotetsu Boku (DREAM, K-1 Hero's, KOTC, Shooto, OneFC)
- (United States) Stephan Bonnar (†) (Jungle Fight, UFC, Bellator)
- (Brazil) Rogério Bontorin (UFC, Rizin, Pancrase)
- (United States) Ray Borg (KOTC, Legacy, UFC)
- (Hungary) Ádám Borics (PFL, Bellator)
- (Brazil) Caio Borralho (UFC)
- (Canada) Tanner Boser (UFC, M-1, ACB)
- (Canada) Steve Bossé (UFC)
- (Japan) Marcus Bossett (UFC)
- (Belgium) Youssef Boughanem (Brave CF)
- (United States) Brian Bowles (WEC, UFC)
- (United States) Roger Bowling (Strikeforce, UFC)
- (Uzbekistan) Anvar Boynazarov (LFA)
- (United States) Paul Bradley (Bellator, UFC)
- (United States) Sean Brady (UFC)
- (Brazil) Ebenezer Fontes Braga (Pancrase, Jungle Fight, PRIDE, UFC)
- (United States) Ramiz Brahimaj (UFC)
- (United States) David Branch (UFC, Bellator, WSOF, Titan FC)
- (Brazil) Diego Brandão (UFC)
- (Mexico) Martin Bravo (UFC)
- (England) Tom Breese (UFC, BAMMA)
- (United States) Chris Brennan (KOTC, PRIDE, UFC, Shooto, Cage Rage)
- (United States) Lucas Brennan (Bellator, PFL)
- (United States) Charlie Brenneman (UFC, ShoXC)
- (United States) Jason Brilz (UFC, KOTC, Titan FC)
- (United States) Marcus Brimage (UFC)
- (United States) Aaron Brink (UFC)
- Henry Briones (UWC Mexico, UFC)
- (Brazil) Joanderson Brito (UFC, LFA)
- (United States) Antwain Britt (Strikeforce, YAMMA)
- (United States) Mike Bronzoulis (Strikeforce, Bellator, Titan FC)
- (United States) Jonathan Brookins (Bellator, WEC, UFC)
- (United States) Jarred Brooks (ONE, Pancrase, UFC)
- (United States) Will Brooks (Bellator, DREAM, UFC)
- (England) Rob Broughton (RINGS, Cage Rage, M-1, UFC)
- (Australia) Damien Brown (UFC)
- (United States) Matt Brown (UFC)
- (United States) Mike Brown (DEEP, WEC, UFC)
- (Jamaica) Randy Brown (UFC)
- (United States) T.J. Brown (UFC)
- (United States) Travis Browne (KOTC, Bellator, UFC)
- (United States) Steve Bruno (UFC, IFL, MFC)
- (United States) Cody Brundage (UFC)
- (United States) Derek Brunson (Strikeforce, UFC, PFL)
- (Poland) Robert Bryczek (UFC, Oktagon MMA, FEN MMA)
- (Brazil) Marcus Buchecha (ONE, UFC)
- (United States) Justin Buchholz (EliteXC, UFC)
- (United States) Zak Bucia (Strikeforce, KOTC)
- (United States) Joaquin Buckley (UFC)
- (United States) Mike Budnik (KOTC, WEC)
- (United States) Paul Buentello (KOTC, Strikeforce, Affliction, UFC, Legacy, Bellator)
- (Poland) Marek Bujło (UFC)
- (Lithuania) Modestas Bukauskas (UFC, CWFC)
- (Netherlands) Ilias Bulaid (Bellator, Brave CF)
- (United States) Shawn Bunch (Bellator)
- (United States) Shane Burgos (UFC)
- (United States) Josh Burkman (UFC, WSOF)
- (United States) LaRue Burley (LFA, Bellator, KOTC, WSOF)
- (Denmark) Mads Burnell (PFL, UFC)
- (United States) Mikey Burnett (UFC)
- (Brazil) Gilbert Burns (UFC)
- (Brazil) Herbert Burns (UFC)
- (United States) Kevin Burns (UFC)
- (United States) Nah-Shon Burrell (Strikeforce, UFC, Bellator)
- (Brazil) Murilo Bustamante (DEEP, Pancrase, Pride, UFC)
- (United States) Jason Butcher (Bellator)
- (United States) Raphael Butler (Bellator)
- (United States) Charles Byrd (UFC)

== C ==
- (Brazil) Yan Cabral (UFC)
- (United States) Alex Caceres (KOTC, UFC)
- (United States) Darrion Caldwell (Bellator)
- (United States) Andrew Calandrelli (Bellator)
- (Northern Mariana Islands) Frank Camacho (UFC)
- (Brazil) Fabrício Camões (UFC, Strikeforce, ShoXC, TPF)
- (United States) Brian Camozzi (UFC, RFA)
- (United States) Chris Camozzi (UFC, MFC)
- (Canada) Shane Campbell (MFC, WSOF)
- (United States) Derek Campos (Bellator, KOTC)
- (Mexico) Will Campuzano (UFC, WEC, VTJ)
- (United States) Aleksa Camur (UFC)
- (United States) Chico Camus (UFC, RFA)
- (Brazil) Luiz Cané (UFC)
- (Argentina) Guido Cannetti (UFC)
- (United States) Jared Cannonier (UFC)
- (Cuba) Jose Canseco (DREAM)
- (United States) Steve Cantwell (UFC, WEC, Jungle Fight)
- (Brazil) Bruno Cappelozza (PFL)
- (United States) Frank Caraballo (Bellator)
- (United States) Bryan Caraway (UFC, WEC, Strikeforce, EliteXC)
- (United States) Phil Cardella (WEC)
- (United States) Chris Cariaso (UFC, WEC, Strikeforce, ShoXC)
- (United States) Steve Carl (M-1, Bellator, WSOF)
- (Brazil) Antônio Carlos Júnior (UFC, PFL)
- (United States) Spike Carlyle (UFC, LFA, Bellator, Rizin)
- (France) Francis Carmont (KSW, UFC)
- (Brazil) Roan Carneiro (UFC, Shooto, DEEP)
- (United States) Tim Carpenter (Bellator)
- (United States) Shonie Carter (UFC, WEC, Pancrase, Shooto, Bellator, KOTC, MFC, KSW, M-1)
- (Canada) Antonio Carvalho (UFC, Shooto, MFC)
- (Portugal) João Carvalho (†)
- (Portugal) Pedro Carvalho (PFL, Bellator)
- (Brazil) Rafael Carvalho (Bellator)
- (United States) Shane Carwin (UFC, WEC)
- (United States) Johnny Case (RFA, UFC)
- (United States) Cortney Casey (UFC)
- (United States) Kevin Casey (UFC, Strikeforce, RFA, K-1 Hero's, Bellator)
- (France) Bendy Casimir (M-1, Shooto, WEC, Cage Rage, CWFC)
- (United States) Lester Caslow (Bellator, CFFC)
- (United States) John Castañeda (UFC)
- (United States) Danny Castillo (UFC, WEC, PFC)
- (United States) Gil Castillo (WEC, KOTC, UFC)
- (United States) Raul Castillo (Strikeforce)
- (United States) Tim Catalfo (PRIDE, KOTC)
- (United States) Nick Catone (UFC)
- (United States) Luke Caudillo (UFC, Strikeforce)
- (United States) Sullivan Cauley (Bellator, PFL)
- (Brazil) Gesias Cavalcante (K-1 Hero's, Shooto, DREAM, Cage Rage, CWFC, Strikeforce, WSOF)
- (Brazil) Rafael Cavalcante (UFC, Strikeforce, EliteXC, IFL)
- (Sweden) Magnus Cedenblad (UFC)
- (Cuba) Yosdenis Cedeno (UFC)
- (United States) Henry Cejudo (LFA, UFC)
- (United States) Donald Cerrone (WEC, UFC)
- (Brazil) Julio Cesar (KSW, Bellator)
- (Brazil) Luan Chagas (UFC)
- (Mexico) Édgar Cháirez (Combate Americas, UFC)
- (United States) Jason Chambers (DEEP)
- (United States) Michael Chandler (Strikeforce, Bellator, UFC)
- (United States) Dan Charles (Bellator)
- (United States) Joe Charles (Pancrase, UFC)
- (United States) Danny Chavez (UFC)
- (United States) Ernest Chavez (UFC)
- (United States) Rick Cheek (PFC)
- (United States) Fabio Cherant (UFC, LFA)
- (United States) Michael Chiesa (UFC)
- (Georgia (country)) Giga Chikadze (UFC)
- (Russia) Khamzat Chimaev (UFC)
- (Armenia) Sako Chivitchian (UFC)
- (South Korea) Doo Ho Choi (M-1, Sengoku, DEEP, UFC)
- (South Korea) Hong Man Choi (DREAM, K-1, K-1 Hero's)
- (South Korea) Mu Bae Choi (PRIDE, Sengoku, K-1 Hero's, Pancrase)
- (South Korea) Choi Seung-woo (UFC)
- (United States) John Cholish (UFC, Strikeforce)
- (Japan) Ryo Chonan (DEEP, Pancrase, Sengoku, DREAM, PRIDE, UFC)
- (Denmark) Joachim Christensen (UFC, M1 Challenge)
- (United States) Dan Christison (IFL, KOTC, WEC, UFC)
- (Turkey) Ibragim Chuzhigaev (ACB, KSW)
- (Poland) Jan Ciepłowski (PFL, FEN MMA)
- (Croatia) Branko Cikatić (PRIDE)
- (Latvia) Misha Cirkunov (UFC)
- (United States) Johnny Cisneros (Bellator, KOTC)
- (United States) Devin Clark (UFC, RFA)
- (United States) LaVerne Clark (UFC, RINGS, Pancrase, WFA, DEEP, KOTC, MFC)
- (United States) Logan Clark (UFC, WEC, Sengoku)
- (Canada) Mitch Clarke (UFC, KOTC)
- (United States) Tywan Claxton (Bellator)
- (United States) Rich Clementi (UFC, Bellator, DREAM, K-1 Hero's, Adrenaline MMA, Titan FC)
- (Canada) Chris Clements (UFC)
- (United States) Scott Cleve (Bellator)
- (United States) Dakota Cochrane (Adrenaline MMA, Titan FC)
- (Brazil) Felipe Colares (†) (UFC, Jungle Fight)
- (United States) Devin Cole (Strikeforce, IFL, PFC, WSOF)
- (United States) Mark Coleman (PRIDE, UFC)
- (United States) Clay Collard (PFL, UFC)
- (United States) Jake Collier (UFC, RFA)
- (South Africa) Vuyisile Colossa (OneFC)
- (United States) Carlos Condit (KOTC, UFC, WEC, Pancrase)
- (Canada) Tristan Connelly (UFC)
- (Australia) Alex Cook (Pancrase, VTJ, Shooto)
- (United States) T. J. Cook (Strikeforce)
- (United States) Brett Cooper (Bellator, Affliction, Jungle Fight, IFL, Shooto)
- (United States) Dewey Cooper (Strikeforce, PFC)
- (United States) Ray Cooper III (PFL)
- (United States) Chris Cope (UFC, Strikeforce)
- (United States) Kit Cope (UFC, WEC, WFA)
- (Sweden) Akira Corassani (UFC, Shooto)
- (United States) Mike Corey (Bellator, IFL, KOTC, WSOF)
- (United States) Daniel Cormier (KOTC, Strikeforce, UFC)
- (United States) Henry Corrales (Bellator, KOTC)
- (United States) Wesley Correira (RINGS, EliteXC, UFC, WEC)
- (Dominican Republic) Waldo Cortés-Acosta (LFA, Bellator, UFC)
- (Brazil) Melquizael Costa (UFC, LFA)
- (Brazil) Paulo Costa (UFC, Jungle Fight)
- (United States) Randy Costa (UFC)
- (Canada) Patrick Côté (KOTC, MFC, UFC)
- (United States) Rashad Coulter (UFC, Bellator, LFA)
- (United States) Randy Couture (UFC, VTJ, RINGS)
- (United States) Ryan Couture (UFC, Strikeforce, Bellator)
- (United States) Colby Covington (UFC)
- (United States) Nathan Coy (Strikeforce, MFC, Bellator)
- (United States) Andrew Craig (UFC, Bellator)
- (Scotland) Paul Craig (UFC, BAMMA)
- (United States) Dan Cramer (UFC, Bellator)
- (United States) Alberto Crane (KOTC, UFC)
- (United States) Tim Credeur (UFC, KOTC)
- (United States) Paul Creighton (UFC)
- (United States) Kevin Croom (LFA, Titan FC, Bellator, UFC)
- (United States) Allen Crowder (UFC)
- (United States) Daron Cruickshank (UFC, KOTC)
- (United States) Richard Crunkilton (UFC, WEC)
- (United States) Kyle Crutchmer (Bellator)
- (Australia) Jimmy Crute (UFC)
- (United States) Dominick Cruz (UFC, WEC)
- (Brazil) Márcio Cruz (Sengoku, IFL, UFC)
- (Australia) Joshua Culibao (UFC)
- (United States) Abel Cullum (KOTC, ShoXC, DREAM)
- (United States) Zak Cummings (UFC, MFC, Bellator, Titan FC, Strikeforce)
- (United States) Patrick Cummins (UFC)
- (United States) Luke Cummo (UFC)
- (Brazil) João Cunha
- (United States) Jeff Curran (IFL, KOTC, PRIDE, WEC, WFA, Bellator, UFC, Strikeforce)
- (United States) Pat Curran (Bellator, Adrenaline MMA)
- (Moldova) Ion Cuțelaba (UFC)

== D ==
- (Brazil) Bruno Gustavo da Silva (UFC)
- (Brazil) Genair da Silva (Bellator)
- (Brazil) Henrique da Silva (UFC)
- (Brazil) Alex da Silva Coelho (UFC, Brave CF)
- (Lithuania) Pavel Dailidko (Brave CF)
- (Denmark) Nicolas Dalby (UFC)
- (England) Paul Daley (UFC, Strikeforce, Bellator, Cage Rage, BAMMA, ShoXC, MFC, CWFC)
- (Brazil) Rodrigo Damm (UFC, Strikeforce, Sengoku, Shooto)
- (Germany) Jarjis Danho (UFC)
- (United States) Raymond Daniels (Strikeforce)
- (United States) Dillon Danis (Bellator)
- (Brazil) Alexandre Dantas (UFC)
- (Brazil) Eduardo Dantas (Shooto, Bellator)
- (United States) Mac Danzig (WEC, KOTC, PRIDE, UFC)
- (Armenia) Karen Darabedyan (WEC)
- (United States) Beneil Dariush (UFC)
- (Russia) Viacheslav Datsik (M-1)
- (United States) Chris Daukaus (UFC)
- (United States) Kyle Daukaus (UFC, CFFC)
- (England) Alfie Davis (KSW, Bellator, PFL)
- (United States) Brandon Davis (UFC)
- (United States) Chris Davis (Bellator, Adrenaline MMA, XFC)
- (United States) Joey Davis (Bellator)
- (United States) LC Davis (WEC, Sengoku, Affliction, IFL, Adrenaline MMA, Bellator, Titan FC)
- (United States) Marcus Davis (UFC, MFC, Bellator)
- (United States) Mike Davis (UFC)
- (United States) Phil Davis (PFC, UFC)
- (United States) Raphael Davis (Bellator, M-1, IFL, Titan FC)
- (Canada) Hakeem Dawodu (UFC)
- (United States) Grant Dawson (UFC)
- (Canada) Jason Day (UFC, KOTC, MFC)
- (United States) Martin Day (UFC)
- (Cape Verde) Yorgan De Castro (UFC, PFL)
- (Brazil) Geraldo de Freitas (UFC, Shooto)
- (England) Phil De Fries (UFC)
- (Dominican Republic) Omar de la Cruz (Bellator, Sengoku)
- (United States) Chris de la Rocha (UFC)
- (United States) Mark De La Rosa (UFC)
- (United States) Mike De La Torre (UFC)
- (Brazil) Johil de Oliveira (PRIDE, Cage Rage, Shooto, Jungle Fight)
- (Netherlands) Reinier de Ridder (OneFC, UFC)
- (Brazil) Roberto de Souza (Rizin)
- (United States) Herb Dean (KOTC, Cage Rage)
- (United States) Tom DeBlass (Bellator, UFC)
- (Netherlands) Ramon Dekkers (K-1 Hero's)
- (United States) Shane Del Rosario (†) (UFC, Strikeforce, ShoXC, M-1, KOTC)
- (United States) Jesse Delgado (Bellator)
- (United States) Rolando Delgado (UFC, Bellator, Shooto)
- (Croatia) Ante Delija (PFL, Rizin)
- (Canada) Roland Delorme (UFC)
- (Guam) Jon Delos Reyes (UFC)
- (United States) Jason DeLucia (Pancrase, Cage Rage, UFC)
- (United States) Guy Delumeau (Shooto, Pancrase, DEEP)
- (United States) Chris Dempsey (UFC, Bellator)
- (Canada) Nick Denis (UFC, KOTC, Sengoku)
- (United States) Jason Dent (UFC, KOTC)
- (Peru) Tony DeSouza (UFC, Jungle Fight, WFA)
- (Cuba) Robelis Despaigne (UFC, Titan FC)
- (France) Hugo Deux (KSW)
- (United States) Cory Devela (Strikeforce)
- (Nepal) Rabindra Dhant (MFN, ONE, Brave CF)
- (Italy) Alessio Di Chirico (IMMAF, UFC)
- (France) Cyrille Diabaté (PRIDE, Cage Rage, ShoXC, UFC, PFC, TPF, M-1, DEEP, RINGS)
- (France) Ousmane Thomas Diagne (Strikeforce)
- (England) Marc Diakiese (UFC, Bellator, BAMMA)
- (Brazil) Hacran Dias (Jungle Fight, Pancrase, Shooto, M-1, UFC)
- (United States) Nate Diaz (WEC, Strikeforce, UFC)
- (United States) Nick Diaz (PRIDE, Shooto, DREAM, UFC, WEC, EliteXC, Strikeforce)
- (United States) Josh Diekmann (WEC, Bellator)
- (United States) T.J. Dillashaw (UFC, KOTC)
- (Bulgaria) Rosen Dimitrov (M-1, Shooto)
- (Bulgaria) Rumen Dimitrov (Shooto)
- (Brazil) Jhonata Diniz (UFC)
- (United States) Russell Doane (KOTC, TPF, UFC)
- (United States) Drew Dober (Bellator, Titan FC, UFC)
- (United States) John Dodson (UFC, KOTC)
- (Canada) Joe Doerksen (DEEP, IFL, WEC, KOTC, RINGS, Sengoku, UFC)
- (Georgia (country)) Roman Dolidze (UFC)
- (United States) C.B. Dollaway (UFC, Rizin)
- (United States) Cody Donovan (Bellator, UFC)
- (Brazil) Rafael dos Anjos (UFC, Pancrase, Shooto)
- (Brazil) Anderson dos Santos (UFC, Titan)
- (Brazil) Junior dos Santos (UFC)
- (United States) David Douglas (EliteXC, ShoXC, Strikeforce)
- (Cameroon) Cédric Doumbé (Bellator, PFL)
- (United States) Danny Downes (UFC, WEC, KOTC)
- (United States) Jared Downing (Bellator)
- (Poland) Tomasz Drwal (UFC)
- (United States) Robert Drysdale (UFC)
- (South Africa) Dricus du Plessis (EFC, KSW, UFC)
- (Guam) Joe Duarte (Strikeforce, Bellator)
- (United States) Todd Duffee (UFC, SFL, Jungle Fight, DREAM)
- (Republic of Ireland) Joseph Duffy (UFC, CWFC)
- (Germany) Islam Dulatov (UFC, Brave)
- (United States) Kelly Dullanty (UFC, KOTC)
- (Scotland) Chris Duncan (UFC, Bellator)
- (United States) Evan Dunham (PFC, UFC)
- (France) Tom Duquesnoy (BAMMA, UFC)
- (United States) Reuben Duran (UFC, KOTC)
- (United States) Cody Durden (UFC)
- (Georgia (country)) Merab Dvalishvili (UFC)
- (Czech Republic) David Dvořák (UFC)
- (Canada) Matt Dwyer (UFC)
- (Philippines) Rolando Dy (UFC, Brave)

== E ==
- (United States) Marvin Eastman (KOTC, MFC, UFC, WFA, Shooto)
- (United States) Mike Easton (UFC)
- (United States) Brian Ebersole (UFC, IFL, Shooto, KOTC, Strikeforce)
- (United States) Johnny Eblen (Bellator)
- (Philippines) Mark Eddiva (UFC)
- (United States) Frankie Edgar (UFC)
- (Russia) Abdul-Kerim Edilov (†) (M1, Friday Nights, ACB, UFC)
- (Brazil) Carlos Eduardo (Bellator, Shooto)
- (Brazil) Johnny Eduardo (UFC, Bellator, Jungle Fight, Shooto, VTJ)
- (United Kingdom) Fabian Edwards (Bellator)
- (United States) Justin Edwards (UFC, Bellator)
- (England) Leon Edwards (UFC, BAMMA)
- (The Bahamas) Yves Edwards (KOTC, UFC, Shooto, WEC, PRIDE, EliteXC, Strikeforce, MFC, Bellator)
- (United States) Justin Eilers (†) (UFC, WEC, EliteXC)
- (Norway) John-Olav Einemo (UFC, Shooto, PRIDE)
- (Sweden) Per Eklund (M-1, Shooto, UFC)
- (United States) Billy Elekana (UFC, PFL, LFA)
- (United States) Darren Elkins (UFC)
- (United States) Jake Ellenberger (UFC, IFL, Bellator, M-1, KOTC)
- (United States) Tim Elliott (UFC, Titan FC, RFA)
- (Australia) Jason Ellis
- (Russia) Ramazan Emeev (UFC, M-1, ACB)
- (Russia) Alexander Emelianenko (M-1, PRIDE)
- (Russia) Fedor Emelianenko (PRIDE, RINGS, Affliction, Strikeforce, M-1, Bellator)
- (United States) Rob Emerson (Pancrase, Shooto, UFC, KOTC, DEEP, TPF, Bellator)
- (United States) Jamall Emmers (UFC)
- (United States) Josh Emmett (UFC, KOTC)
- (Sweden) Oliver Enkamp (UFC, Bellator)
- (Switzerland) Yasubey Enomoto (M-1, KSW, Shooto)
- (England) Ian Entwistle (UFC, Brave CF)
- (United States) Andy Enz (UFC)
- (Brazil) Kleber Koike Erbst (Rizin, KSW, DEEP)
- (Australia) Steve Erceg (UFC)
- (United States) Tom Erikson (K-1 Hero's, PRIDE, VTJ)
- (United States) Julian Erosa (UFC)
- (United States) Eric Esch (Cage Rage, K-1, KOTC, PRIDE, PFC, KSW, YAMMA)
- (United States) Cole Escovedo (WEC, IFL, PFC, Strikeforce, TPF, DREAM, UFC)
- (Mexico) Efraín Escudero (UFC, TPF, Bellator, LUX)
- (Spain) Juan Espino (UFC)
- (United States) Jordan Espinosa (UFC)
- (Brazil) Braulio Estima (Titan FC)
- (England) Terry Etim (UFC, Bellator)
- (United States) Billy Evangelista (Strikeforce, WEC, PFC)
- (United States) Doug Evans (Bellator, ShoXC, UFC)
- (United States) Rashad Evans (UFC)
- (Norway) Dan Evensen (UFC, Bellator)
- (Russia) Movsar Evloev (UFC)
- (United States) Andre Ewell (UFC, LFA)

== F ==
- (United States) Edward Faaloloto (UFC, WEC, Pancrase)
- (United States) Urijah Faber (KOTC, WEC, UFC)
- (Brazil) Wagnney Fabiano (IFL, WEC, Bellator)
- (Poland) Bartosz Fabiński (UFC, KSW)
- (Russia) Rinat Fakhretdinov (UFC)
- (Brazil) Maiquel Falcão (UFC, Bellator, KSW)
- (Australia) Gustavo Falciroli (Shooto, OneFC)
- (United States) Brodie Farber (UFC)
- (Egypt) Mahmoud Fawzy (Bellator, PFL, Brave CF)
- (United States) Paul Felder (UFC)
- (United States) Carlos Felipe (UFC, ACB)
- (The Bahamas) Kevin "Kimbo Slice" Ferguson (†) (CFFC, EliteXC, UFC)
- (United States) Tony Ferguson (UFC)
- (Brazil) Bibiano Fernandes (Jungle Fight, KOTC, K-1 Hero's, DREAM, OneFC)
- (Brazil) Alexandre Ferreira (UFC, IFL, Jungle Fight, RINGS)
- (Brazil) Brunno Ferreira (UFC)
- (Brazil) Carlos Diego Ferreira (Legacy, UFC)
- (Brazil) Cezar Ferreira (UFC)
- (Russia) Renan Ferreira (PFL)
- (United States) Scott Ferrozzo (UFC)
- (Portugal) André Fialho (UFC)
- (United States) Drew Fickett (KOTC, UFC, Cage Rage, Strikeforce, MFC, DREAM, XFC)
- (Brazil) Deiveson Figueiredo (UFC, Jungle Fight)
- (Brazil) Francisco Figueiredo (UFC, Jungle Fight)
- (United States) Edwin Figueroa (UFC)
- (Brazil) Paulo Filho (DEEP, Pancrase, PRIDE, DREAM, WEC, WSOF)
- (United States) Andre Fili (UFC, KOTC, TPF)
- (Croatia) Mirko "Cro Cop" Filipović (PRIDE, UFC, DREAM, Rizin, Bellator)
- (United States) Perry Filkins (Bellator)
- (Italy) Luigi Fioravanti (UFC, MFC, M-1 Global)
- (Brazil) Luiz Firmino (DREAM, M-1 Global, PRIDE, Shooto, WSOF)
- (United States) Jason Fischer (Bellator)
- (United States) Spencer Fisher (UFC)
- (England) Chris Fishgold (UFC, CWFC, BAMMA)
- (United States) Jon Fitch (Shooto, UFC, WSOF)
- (Azerbaijan) Rafael Fiziev (UFC)
- (England) Colin Fletcher (UFC, BAMMA)
- (Republic of Ireland) Will Fleury (Bellator, PFL, Oktagon)
- (United States) Kenny Florian (UFC)
- (United States) Caros Fodor (KOTC, Strikeforce, UFC, OneFC)
- (Philippines) Eduard Folayang (URCC, OneFC)
- (United States) Jesse Forbes (UFC, WEC, MFC)
- (Canada) Ryan Ford (MFC, Bellator, WSOF)
- (Poland) Kacper Formela (KSW, FEN MMA, Babilon MMA, CWFC, ACB)
- (Brazil) Jussier Formiga (Shooto, TPF, UFC)
- (Brazil) Renee Forte (UFC, Jungle Fight, Shooto)
- (Brazil) Marcel Fortuna (UFC, Titan FC)
- (United States) Tyrell Fortune (UFC, Bellator, PFL)
- (United States) Brian Foster (UFC, CWFC, Titan FC)
- (United States) Kenny Foster (Bellator)
- (Brazil) Hermes França (K-1 Hero's, Shooto, UFC, WEC, MFC)
- (United States) John Franchi (IFL, WEC)
- (United States) Rich Franklin (UFC, WFA)
- (United States) Justin Frazier (UFC, Bellator)
- (United States) Zane Frazier (UFC, Shooto, RINGS, KOTC, WEC)
- (England) Ian Freeman (Cage Rage, CWFC, M-1, Pancrase, UFC)
- (Brazil) Willamy Freire (UFC, Shooto, DREAM, VTJ)
- (United States) Clay French (KOTC, Sengoku, PRIDE, Adrenaline MMA, Titan FC, XFC)
- (United States) Matt Frevola (UFC)
- (Slovenia) Miha Frlić (Brave CF, KSW)
- (United States) Don Frye (K-1, K-1 Hero's, PRIDE, KOTC, UFC, DEEP)
- (United States) Tony Fryklund (UFC, WEC, Strikeforce, Cage Rage, Titan FC, Bellator)
- (Japan) Yutaka Fuji (Shooto)
- (Japan) Katsuhisa Fujii (Shooto, UFC, Pancrase, DEEP, RINGS, PRIDE, M-1)
- (Japan) Mitsuo Fujikura (Shooto)
- (Japan) Kazuyuki Fujita (K-1, PRIDE, Sengoku)
- (Japan) Yoshihiro Fujita (Shooto)
- (Japan) Yuji Fujita (Shooto)
- (Japan) Keisuke Fujiwara (DREAM, Shooto)
- (Japan) Masato Fujiwara (Shooto)
- (Japan) Riki Fukuda (DEEP, EliteXC, DREAM, K-1 UFC)
- (Japan) Satoshi Fukuoka (Shooto)
- (United States) Travis Fulton (†) (UFC, WEC, KOTC, IFL, Pancrase, RINGS)
- (Japan) Masakatsu Funaki (Pancrase, K-1 Hero's, DREAM, RINGS)
- (Brazil) Ricardo Funch (UFC)
- (Netherlands) Ricardo Fyeet (RINGS)

== G ==
- (United States) Justin Gaethje (UFC, WSOF)
- (Russia) Marat Gafurov (ONE, ACB, M-1)
- (Canada) Mitch Gagnon (UFC)
- (Croatia) Zelg Galešić (Cage Rage, PRIDE, DREAM, Bellator, SFL, K-1 Hero's)
- (Russia) Vener Galiev (M-1)
- (United States) Mickey Gall (UFC)
- (Brazil) André Galvão (Strikeforce, DREAM)
- (Brazil) Marcos Galvão (Shooto, Jungle Fight, WEC, Bellator)
- (Brazil) Mauro Galvão (Shooto, Jungle Fight)
- (Armenia) Manny Gamburyan (UFC, WEC, KOTC)
- (Poland) Mateusz Gamrot (UFC)
- (Russia) Shamil Gamzatov (UFC, PFL, WSOF, ACB)
- (France) Ciryl Gane (UFC)
- (Brazil) Luiz Eduardo Garagorri (UFC)
- (United States) Cody Garbrandt (UFC)
- (Dominican Republic) Alex Garcia (UFC)
- (Mexico) Edgar Garcia (WEC, UFC, Bellator, TPF)
- (United States) Leonard Garcia (UFC, WEC)
- (Mexico) Rafa García (UFC)
- (United States) Steve Garcia (Bellator, UFC)
- (United States) Pablo Garza (KOTC, WEC, UFC)
- (United States) Brian Gassaway (†) (Bellator, WEC, KOTC, Shooto, Pancrase)
- (United States) Kelvin Gastelum (UFC)
- (United States) Willie Gates (UFC, Bellator, KOTC)
- (United States) Louis Gaudinot (UFC)
- (Cameroon) Ateba Gautier (UFC)
- (Bahrain) Shamil Gaziev (Brave, UFC)
- (United States) Chad George (WEC, TPF)
- (Bulgaria) Kamen Georgiev (Shooto)
- (Netherlands) Hesdy Gerges (Bellator)
- (United States) Tiki Ghosn (WEC, UFC, WFA, KOTC, Strikeforce)
- (United States) Christos Giagos (UFC, ACB)
- (United States) Cody Gibson (UFC, TPF)
- (United States) Lance Gibson (UFC, Shooto)
- (United States) Trevin Giles (UFC)
- (United States) Gregor Gillespie (UFC)
- (United States) Bob Gilstrap (UFC)
- (United States) Brandon Girtz (Bellator)
- (Poland) Bartłomiej Gładkowicz (Babilon MMA, KSW)
- (United States) Ricky Glenn (UFC)
- (Poland) Krzysztof Głowacki (Babilon MMA, KSW)
- (Latvia) Konstantin Gluhov (K-1, M-1, KSW, Pancrase)
- (Netherlands) Massaro Glunder
- (Netherlands) Rodney Glunder (RINGS, PRIDE, Cage Rage, M-1, KSW, AOW)
- (England) Mark Godbeer (BAMMA, UFC)
- (Brazil) Allan Goes (IFL, Pancrase, PRIDE, UFC)
- (Georgia (country)) Bakouri Gogitidze (RINGS)
- (United States) Bryan Goldsby (Bellator, Adrenaline MMA, Titan FC, PFC)
- (Brazil) Marcelo Golm (UFC, PFL, Bellator)
- (Russia) Denis Goltsov (PFL)
- (Russia) Sergey Golyaev (M-1, Shooto, Sengoku)
- (United States) Anthony Gomez (Bellator)
- (United States) Frank Gomez (WEC)
- (Paraguay) Mikey Gomez (EliteXC, XFC, Bellator)
- (United States) Ulysses Gomez (UFC, Bellator, TPF, PFC)
- (Japan) Takanori Gomi (PRIDE, Shooto, VTJ, Sengoku, UFC)
- (Russia) Evgeniy Goncharov (ACB)
- (Japan) Akihiro Gono (DEEP, Pancrase, PRIDE, Shooto, UFC, Sengoku, Bellator)
- (Brazil) Gabriel Gonzaga (Shooto, Jungle Fight, UFC)
- (United States) Chris Gonzalez (Bellator)
- (United States) Fernando Gonzalez (WEC, KOTC, Strikeforce, Bellator)
- (United States) Jason Gonzalez (UFC)
- (United States) Lyman Good (IFL, CFFC, Bellator, UFC)
- (United States) Jared Gooden (UFC)
- (United States) Herbert Goodman (Bellator, M-1, KOTC)
- (Canada) Gary Goodridge (K-1, K-1 Hero's, PRIDE, Affliction, UFC)
- (Netherlands) Gerard Gordeau (UFC, VTJ)
- (Jamaica) Eddie Gordon (UFC)
- (United States) Jared Gordon (CFFC, UFC)
- (Canada) Malcolm Gordon (UFC, Bellator)
- (Zimbabwe) Themba Gorimbo (UFC)
- (United States) Chase Gormley (UFC, Bellator, XFC, MFC, KOTC, ACB)
- (Canada) Jonathan Goulet (KOTC, UFC)
- (France) Thibault Gouti (UFC, Bellator)
- (Brazil) Wilson Gouveia (UFC, MFC, KOTC)
- (Israel) Haim Gozali (Bellator, Jungle Fight)
- (Poland) Damian Grabowski (Bellator, M-1, UFC)
- (Brazil) Daniel Gracie (Bellator, PRIDE)
- (Brazil) Kron Gracie (UFC)
- (Brazil) Neiman Gracie (WSOF, Bellator)
- (Brazil) Ralek Gracie (DREAM, K-1 Hero's)
- (Brazil) Renzo Gracie (PRIDE, RINGS, K-1, IFL, EliteXC, UFC)
- (Brazil) Rickson Gracie (PRIDE, VTJ)
- (Brazil) Rodrigo Gracie (PRIDE, K-1 Hero's)
- (Brazil) Roger Gracie (Sengoku, Strikeforce, UFC, OneFC)
- (Brazil) Rolles Gracie (IFL, AOW, UFC, OneFC, WSOF)
- (Brazil) Royce Gracie (K-1, K-1 Hero's, PRIDE, UFC)
- (Brazil) Royler Gracie (VTJ, PRIDE, K-1 Hero's)
- (Brazil) Ryan Gracie (PRIDE)
- (Australia) Peter Graham (Sengoku, AOW, Bellator, KSW)
- (England) Davey Grant (UFC)
- (United States) Dwight Grant (UFC, Bellator)
- (Canada) T. J. Grant (KOTC, UFC)
- (United States) Tony Gravely (UFC, LFA, CFFC)
- (United States) Michael Graves (UFC, Titan FC)
- (Lithuania) Sergej Grecicho (Bellator, Shooto, K-1 Hero's, CWFC, KSW)
- (Australia) Sam Greco (K-1, K-1 Hero's)
- (United States) Bobby Green (Strikeforce, Affliction, KOTC, TPF, UFC)
- (United States) Desmond Green (Bellator, Titan FC, UFC)
- (United States) Gabriel Green (UFC)
- (United States) Maurice Greene (UFC, PFL, LFA)
- (United States) Matt Grice (UFC)
- (United States) Forrest Griffin (KOTC, UFC)
- (United States) Jordan Griffin (UFC, LFA, KOTC)
- (United States) Max Griffin (UFC)
- (Russia) Maxim Grishin (UFC, PFL)
- (United States) Tyson Griffin (Strikeforce, UFC, WSOF)
- (United States) Chad Griggs (UFC, Strikeforce, IFL)
- (United States) Josh Grispi (WEC, UFC)
- (United States) Kendall Grove (KOTC, UFC, KSW, Bellator)
- (South Africa) Neil Grove (Bellator, Cage Rage, UFC, SFL)
- (United States) Chris Gruetzemacher (WSOF, Strikeforce)
- (England) Mike Grundy (UFC, ACB, BAMMA)
- (Brazil) Fabrício Guerreiro (Bellator)
- (United States) Shannon Gugerty (UFC)
- (United States) Clay Guida (KOTC, Shooto, WEC, UFC, Strikeforce)
- (United States) Jason Guida (ShoXC, Adrenaline MMA, WEC, KSW, Bellator)
- (United States) Melvin Guillard (UFC, WSOF, Bellator)
- (Brazil) Marcelo Guimarães (UFC, Jungle Fight)
- (United States) John Gunderson (IFL, UFC, PFC, TPF, WSOF)
- (Brazil) Fabio Gurgel (UFC)
- (Brazil) Jorge Gurgel (KOTC, UFC, Strikeforce, Titan FC)
- (Uzbekistan) Bogdan Guskov (UFC, Brave CF)
- (Sweden) Alexander Gustafsson (UFC, KSW, Shooto)
- (United States) Chris Gutiérrez (UFC)
- (United States) Mike Guymon (UFC, KOTC, Bellator)

== H ==
- (United States) Jay Haas (Bellator)
- (United States) Keith Hackney (UFC)
- (Bosnia and Herzegovina) Damir Hadzovic (UFC, CWFC)
- (United States) Jake Hager (Bellator)
- (Canada) Tim Hague (†) (KOTC, UFC, MFC, WSOF)
- (United States) Rich Hale (Bellator)
- (United States) Mark Hall (UFC)
- (United States) Ryan Hall (UFC)
- (Jamaica) Uriah Hall (UFC, Bellator)
- (United States) Dennis Hallman (UFC, Strikeforce, MFC, Shooto, WFA, IFL, KOTC, WSOF, Titan FC)
- (Poland) Piotr Hallmann (UFC, CWFC)
- (Finland) Tony Halme (†) (UFC, RINGS)
- (United States) Brandon Halsey (Bellator, KOTC)
- (Japan) Kazuhiro Hamanaka (Pancrase, M-1, IFL, K-1 Hero's, PRIDE)
- (United States) Matt Hamill (UFC, WSOF)
- (United States) Anthony Hamilton (MFC, UFC)
- (United States) Anthony Hamlett (WEC, Shooto)
- (United States) Jared Hamman (WSOF, UFC, ShoXC, Strikeforce)
- (Russia) Volk Han (RINGS)
- (Norway) Joachim Hansen (Shooto, DEEP, K-1 Hero's, PRIDE, DREAM)
- (Germany) Nasrat Haqparast (UFC)
- (Poland) Rafał Haratyk (FEN MMA, Babilon MMA, EFC, ACA, KSW)
- (Netherlands) Antoni Hardonk (RINGS, K-1, UFC)
- (England) Dan Hardy (CWFC, KOTC, UFC)
- (United States) Greg Hardy (UFC)
- (Guyana) Carlston Harris (UFC)
- (United States) Gerald Harris (UFC, DREAM, TPF, Titan FC, WSOF)
- (United States) Dhafir Harris (Bellator)
- (England) Phil Harris (Cage Rage, BAMMA, UFC, CWFC)
- (United States) Walt Harris (UFC, Titan FC)
- (United States) Dale Hartt (UFC)
- (United States) Clay Harvison (UFC, Bellator)
- (Indonesia) Bilal Hasan (UFC, CFFC)
- (Azerbaijan) Farman Hasanov (UFC, LFA)
- (England) Lee Hasdell (RINGS, Cage Rage)
- (United States) Carlton Haselrig (EliteXC)
- (Australia) Chris Haseman (UFC, RINGS, WFA)
- (United States) Hayder Hassan (UFC, M-1, Brave CF, Strikeforce)
- (Japan) Daiki Hata (Pancrase, DEEP, DREAM)
- (England) John Hathaway (UFC, Cage Rage)
- (United States) Phil Hawes (UFC)
- (United States) Rick Hawn (Bellator)
- (United States) Mike Hayes (Strikeforce, PFC, CWFC, Bellator, KSW)
- (United States) Josh Haynes (UFC, IFL)
- (United States) Dustin Hazelett (KOTC, UFC)
- (United States) James Head (UFC)
- (United States) Pat Healy (KOTC, MFC, WEC, Titan FC, IFL, Strikeforce, UFC)
- (United States) Ryan Healy (WEC, Strikeforce, KOTC, MFC, SFL)
- (United States) David Heath (KOTC, MFC, UFC)
- (United States) Jake Hecht (UFC, CWFC)
- (China) Alateng Heili (UFC)
- (Germany) Nick Hein (UFC)
- (United States) Ian Heinisch (UFC, LFA)
- (Poland) Marcin Held (Bellator, Shooto, UFC)
- (United States) Benson Henderson (MFC, WEC, UFC, Bellator)
- (United States) Dan Henderson (RINGS, PRIDE, UFC, Strikeforce)
- (United States) Johny Hendricks (WEC, UFC)
- (Brazil) Luis Henrique (UFC, Shooto)
- (Scotland) Danny Henry (UFC)
- (United States) Victor Henry (UFC)
- (England) Jai Herbert (UFC)
- (United States) Dave Herman (UFC, Bellator, EliteXC, Sengoku, ShoXC, Titan FC)
- (United States) Ed Herman (Pancrase, UFC, Strikeforce)
- (Sweden) Jack Hermansson (UFC, Bellator, CWFC)
- (United States) Alexander Hernandez (UFC)
- (United States) Anthony Hernandez (UFC)
- (Mexico) Álvaro Herrera (UFC)
- (United States) Geane Herrera (†) (UFC, RFA)
- (United States) Heath Herring (K-1 Hero's, PRIDE, UFC)
- (United States) Tony Hervey (Bellator, KOTC, BAMMA, Shooto)
- (United States) Jared Hess (Bellator)
- (United States) Jon Hess (UFC)
- (United States) Clint Hester (UFC)
- (United States) Jimy Hettes (UFC)
- (United States) Conor Heun (IFL, EliteXC, ShoXC, Strikeforce)
- (United States) Marcus Hicks (WEC)
- (United States) Jay Hieron (Bellator, WEC, IFL, Affliction, Strikeforce, UFC, Titan FC)
- (United States) Jason High (UFC, Strikeforce, Affliction, DREAM, Titan FC)
- (Brazil) Leandro Higo (Bellator, LFA, Jungle)
- (United States) Corey Hill (†) (UFC, XFC, TPF)
- (United States) Jamahal Hill (UFC)
- (Canada) Josh Hill (Bellator, WSOF)
- (United States) Branden Lee Hinkle (UFC, RINGS, IVC, Pancrase, VTJ)
- (Japan) Hatsu Hioki (Shooto, PRIDE, Sengoku, UFC, Rizin)
- (Japan) Ren Hiramoto (Rizin)
- (Japan) Kuniyoshi Hironaka (Pancrase, VTJ, DREAM, UFC, Shooto)
- (Japan) Mizuto Hirota (Shooto, Sengoku, Strikeforce, UFC)
- (United States) Matt Hobar (UFC)
- (United States) Bobby Hoffman (KOTC, RINGS, UFC, Jungle Fight)
- (United States) Sam Hoger (UFC, IFL)
- (United States) Josh Hokit (Bellator, LFA, UFC)
- (United States) Mark Holata (Bellator)
- (United States) Andrew Holbrook (UFC)
- (United States) Chris Holdsworth (UFC)
- (United States) Kevin Holland (UFC)
- (Canada) Roger Hollett (MFC, Bellator, UFC)
- (United States) Max Holloway (UFC)
- (United States) Kurt Holobaugh (UFC, Titan FC, XFC, Strikeforce)
- (Republic of Ireland) Patrick Holohan (Pancrase, Cage Contender, UFC)
- (United States) Scott Holtzman (UFC, XFC)
- (United States) Sabah Homasi (Bellator, UFC, Titan FC, Strikeforce)
- (Canada) Mark Hominick (UFC, Affliction, WEC)
- (United States) Chris Honeycutt (Bellator, ACB)
- (Japan) Satoshi Honma (PRIDE, UFC, Shooto, K-1)
- (United States) Chase Hooper (UFC)
- (United States) Darrell Horcher (Bellator, UFC)
- (Japan) Kyoji Horiguchi (Shooto, VTJ, UFC, Rizin)
- (United States) Jeremy Horn (IFL, KOTC, Pancrase, PRIDE, UFC, WEC, RINGS, Adrenaline MMA, Bellator)
- (United States) Dan Hornbuckle (Sengoku, Bellator, DEEP, Titan FC)
- (Poland) Chris Horodecki (Bellator, WEC, IFL)
- (United States) Matt Horwich (UFC, Strikeforce, Bellator, IFL, BAMMA, KSW)
- (United States) Jeff Hougland (UFC, WEC)
- (Canada) Harold Howard (UFC)
- (United States) John Howard (UFC, IFL)
- (Republic of Ireland) Robert Howard
- (United States) Tom Howard (Cage Rage, IFL, K-1)
- (United States) Shane Howell (Bellator, KOTC, UFC)
- (United States) Austin Hubbard (UFC)
- (United States) Roger Huerta (UFC, Bellator, OneFC)
- (United States) Jeff Hughes (UFC, LFA)
- (United States) Mark Hughes (UFC)
- (United States) Matt Hughes (UFC, Shooto, RINGS)
- (Republic of Ireland) Paul Hughes (PFL, Bellator, BAMMA, CWFC)
- (United States) Matt Hume (Pancrase)
- (New Zealand) Mark Hunt (PRIDE, DREAM, UFC)
- (Finland) Abdul Hussein (UFC, Brave CF)
- (United States) Solomon Hutcherson (UFC, MFC)

== I ==
- (United States) Al Iaquinta (UFC)
- (Russia) Khadis Ibragimov (UFC, M-1)
- (United States) Dan Ige (UFC)
- (Belarus) Alexey Ignashov (K-1)
- (Brazil) Fabiano Iha (KOTC, PRIDE, UFC)
- (Japan) Hisao Ikeda (Shooto)
- (Japan) Seichi Ikemoto (DEEP, DREAM, PRIDE, Shooto)
- (Japan) Junji Ikoma (Shooto)
- (Russia) Mikhail Ilyukhin (PRIDE, RINGS, K-1 Hero's)
- (United States) Toby Imada (WEC, KOTC, Bellator)
- (Russia) Zelim Imadaev (UFC)
- (Japan) Masakazu Imanari (Pancrase, PRIDE, Cage Rage, DREAM, DEEP, OneFC)
- (France) Nassourdine Imavov (UFC)
- (United States) Brad Imes (UFC, WEC, IFL, KOTC, Titan FC, PFC)
- (Brazil) Guto Inocente (Shooto, Strikeforce, UFC)
- (United States) Egan Inoue (Shooto, RINGS, PRIDE)
- (United States) Enson Inoue (PRIDE, VTJ, Shooto, UFC)
- (Japan) Naoki Inoue (DEEP, UFC)
- (Japan) Takeshi Inoue (Shooto, DREAM, VTJ)
- (United States) James Irvin (Strikeforce, WEC, UFC, TPF, KSW)
- (Russia) Ali Isaev (Bellator)
- (Japan) Mitsuhiro Ishida (PRIDE, DREAM, Strikeforce, Shooto, DEEP)
- (Japan) Teruto Ishihara (UFC, Shooto)
- (Japan) Satoshi Ishii (K-1, DREAM, Sengoku)
- (Japan) Yoshimasa Ishikawa (Shooto)
- (Japan) Shintaro Ishiwatari (Shooto, Pancrase, Sengoku, VTJ)
- (Japan) Takashi Ishizaki (Shooto)
- (Japan) Tokimitsu Ishizawa (DREAM, K-1 Hero's, PRIDE)
- (Kazakhstan) Damir Ismagulov (UFC, M-1)
- (Brazil) Wallid Ismail (PRIDE, UFC)
- (Brazil) Leandro Issa (OneFC, UFC)
- (Liechtenstein) Valdrin Istrefi (PFL)
- (Japan) Junji Ito (Shooto)
- (Japan) Takenori Ito (Shooto)
- (Japan) Yuji Ito (Shooto)
- (Bulgaria) Blagoy Ivanov (Sengoku, Bellator, WSOF)
- (Japan) Hiroshi Izumi (Sengoku, DREAM)

== J ==
- (Poland) Marcin Jabłoński (Ice Cage, FEN MMA, Babilon MMA, ACB)
- (Haiti) Yves Jabouin (WEC, UFC)
- (United States) Damon Jackson (UFC, Bellator, KOTC, Legacy)
- (United States) Eugene Jackson (UFC, Strikeforce)
- (Jamaica) Jason Jackson (Bellator, PFL, Titan FC)
- (United States) Jeremy Jackson (KOTC, UFC)
- (United States) Kevin Jackson (UFC)
- (United States) Mike Jackson (UFC)
- (United States) Montel Jackson (UFC)
- (United States) Quinton Jackson (KOTC, PRIDE, UFC, WFA, Bellator)
- (United States) Dustin Jacoby (UFC, WSOF, Titan FC, Bellator)
- (United States) Daniel James (PFL)
- (Canada) Ryan Janes (UFC)
- (Montenegro) Miloš Janičić (KSW, Oktagon)
- (Poland) Damian Janikowski (KSW)
- (United States) Dave Jansen (Bellator, WEC, M-1)
- (Brazil) Antoine Jaoude (K-1, IFL)
- (United States) Keith Jardine (KOTC, MFC, Pancrase, UFC, Strikeforce)
- (United States) Justin Jaynes (UFC, Bellator)
- (United States) Thad Jean (LFA, PFL)
- (United States) Bubba Jenkins (TPF, Bellator, ACB)
- (United States) Trent Jenkins (RINGS, UFC)
- (United States) Steve Jennum (UFC)
- (United States) Ryan Jensen (UFC, Strikeforce, Bellator)
- (Poland) Maciej Jewtuszko (UFC, WEC, KSW)
- (United States) Ronald Jhun (Shooto, Strikeforce, UFC, WFA, KOTC)
- (United States) Art Jimmerson (UFC)
- (Canada) Ryan Jimmo (†) (MFC, UFC)
- (Wales) Brett Johns (CWFC, Titan FC, UFC)
- (United States) Miles Johns (UFC)
- (United States) Anthony Johnson (†) (UFC, WSOF, Titan FC)
- (United States) Charles Johnson (UFC, LFA)
- (United States) DaMarques Johnson (UFC, KOTC)
- (United States) Dashon Johnson (UFC)
- (United States) Demetrious Johnson (OneFC, UFC, WEC, KOTC)
- (United States) Jordan Johnson (UFC, RFA)
- (Canada) Kajan Johnson (UFC, MFC, KOTC)
- (United States) Lavar Johnson (Bellator, UFC, WEC, Strikeforce, PFC)
- (United States) Michael Johnson (UFC, Titan FC)
- (United States) Timothy Johnson (UFC, Bellator)
- (United States) Tony Johnson (Bellator, KOTC, ONE, ACB)
- (England) Wesley Johnson (Cage Rage)
- (United States) Brian Johnston (UFC, Strikeforce)
- (Serbia) Nikola Joksović (Brave CF)
- (United States) Jon Jones (UFC)
- (United States) Marcus Jones (UFC)
- (Wales) Mason Jones (UFC, CWFC)
- (Australia) Nathan Jones (PRIDE)
- (United States) Paul Jones (UFC, Shooto)
- (United States) Phoenix Jones (WSOF)
- (Guam) Trevin Jones (UFC, ACB)
- (United States) Kevin Jordan (UFC, Strikeforce)
- (United States) Shawn Jordan (UFC, Strikeforce, Bellator, WEC)
- (Brazil) Ivan Jorge (UFC, Jungle Fight, M-1, Shooto)
- (United States) Scott Jorgensen (UFC, WEC, ShoXC)
- (Poland) Krzysztof Jotko (UFC, PFL)
- (United States) Alan Jouban (UFC, TPF, RFA)
- (Canada) Charles Jourdain (UFC)
- (France) Kevin Jousset (UFC)
- (United States) Jesse Juarez (Bellator, Strikeforce, MFC)
- (India) Anshul Jubli (MFN, UFC)
- (New Zealand) Luke Jumeau (UFC)
- (Bosnia and Herzegovina) Erko Jun (KSW, Brave CF)
- (South Korea) Bu Kyung Jung (DREAM, DEEP)
- (South Korea) Chan Sung Jung (UFC, WEC, Sengoku, DEEP, Pancrase)
- (South Korea) Da Woon Jung (UFC)
- (United States) Myles Jury (Shooto, KOTC, UFC)

== K ==
- (Poland) Patryk Kaczmarczyk (KSW, Babilon MMA)
- (Japan) Hideki Kadowaki (Shooto, Sengoku, DEEP)
- (Russia) Mahamedkhabib Kadzimahamedau (Bellator)
- (China) Tang Kai (ONE)
- (Estonia) Baruto Kaito (Rizin)
- (Japan) Takahiro Kajita (Pancrase, Shooto, DEEP)
- (United States) Kai Kamaka III (UFC, PFL, Bellator, LFA)
- (Denmark) Martin Kampmann (UFC, WFA, KOTC, CWFC)
- (Senegal) Oumar Kane (ONE)
- (Japan) Masanori Kanehara (K-1, K-1 Hero's, Shooto, Pancrase, Sengoku, DEEP, UFC)
- (Canada) Denis Kang (PRIDE, Pancrase, K-1, M-1, UFC, DREAM)
- (South Korea) Kyung Ho Kang (UFC, DEEP, Sengoku)
- (Japan) Hiroyuki Kanno (Shooto)
- (Japan) Tomonari Kanomata (Pancrase, Shooto)
- (Angola) Manel Kape (Rizin, UFC)
- (United States) Dave Kaplan (UFC)
- (New Zealand) Kai Kara-France (UFC)
- (Armenia) Georgi Karakhanyan (WSOF, DREAM, Bellator, BAMMA, KOTC, TPF)
- (United States) Alex Karalexis (WEC, UFC)
- (United States) Impa Kasanganay (PFL, UFC)
- (Poland) Dawid Kasperski (KSW)
- (Netherlands) Joop Kasteel (RINGS)
- (Japan) Hisaki Kato (Bellator, Rizin)
- (Japan) Tetsuji Kato (Shooto, VTJ, DEEP, Strikeforce)
- (Canada) Brad Katona (UFC)
- (United States) Calvin Kattar (UFC, EliteXC)
- (England) Lone'er Kavanagh (UFC, CWFC)
- (Japan) Yukio Kawabe (PRIDE, Pancrase)
- (Japan) Kenji Kawaguchi (Shooto)
- (Japan) Yusuke Kawaguchi (M-1, DEEP, DREAM, KSW)
- (Japan) Namiki Kawahara (ONE, Rizin, DEEP, Pancrase)
- (Japan) Tatsuya Kawajiri (PRIDE, Shooto, Strikeforce, DREAM, UFC)
- (Japan) Saburo Kawakatsu (Shooto)
- (Japan) Ryo Kawamura (Pancrase, Sengoku, OneFC)
- (Belgium) Losene Keita (Oktagon MMA, UFC)
- (Canada) Chris Kelades (Bellator, UFC)
- (New Zealand) Benjamin Kelleher
- (United States) Brian Kelleher (UFC)
- (United States) Tony Kelley (UFC)
- (Australia) Dan Kelly (UFC)
- (Australia) Daniel Kelly (UFC)
- (England) Paul Kelly (UFC, SFL, CWFC)
- (China) Song Kenan (UFC)
- (Canada) Jeremy Kennedy (UFC, Bellator)
- (United States) Tim Kennedy (WEC, IFL, Strikeforce, UFC)
- (United States) Casey Kenney (UFC)
- (Russia) Azamat Kerefov (ACB)
- (United States) Mark Kerr (UFC, PRIDE, IFL, Cage Rage, M-1, YAMMA)
- (United States) Will Kerr (WEC)
- (United States) Ron Keslar (Bellator)
- (Russia) Rustam Khabilov (UFC, OneFC, M-1)
- (Poland) Mamed Khalidov (Shooto, ShoXC, ACB, KSW, Sengoku)
- (Pakistan) Ismail Khan (ONE, Brave CF)
- (Russia) Sergey Khandozhko (UFC, ACB)
- (Russia) Sergei Kharitonov (PRIDE, RINGS, K-1 Hero's, DREAM, Strikeforce, M-1, Bellator)
- (Russia) Magomedrasul Khasbulaev (Bellator, M-1, ACB)
- (Russia) Movlid Khaybulaev (ONE, PFL)
- (France) Ferrid Kheder (Shooto, M-1, Bellator)
- (Russia) Timur Khizriev (Bellator, PFL)
- (Japan) Akira Kibe (DEEP, Shooto)
- (Japan) Akira Kikuchi (K-1 Hero's, Shooto)
- (Japan) Katsunori Kikuno (DEEP, DREAM, UFC)
- (Japan) Sanae Kikuta (VTJ, Pancrase, PRIDE, UFC, Sengoku, DEEP)
- (South Korea) Dong Hyun Kim (DEEP, UFC)
- (South Korea) Jong Man Kim (K-1 Hero's, Shooto, Sengoku, DEEP, M-1)
- (South Korea) Min Soo Kim (K-1 Hero's)
- (South Korea) Soo Chul Kim (Rizin, Road FC)
- (United States) Jeremy Kimball (UFC, RFA, Bellator)
- (United States) Rob Kimmons (UFC, Shooto, WEC, Titan FC)
- (United States) Dustin Kimura (UFC, KOTC)
- (Japan) Koichiro Kimura (VTJ)
- (Japan) Taiei Kin (K-1 Hero's, DREAM)
- (Philippines) Danny Kingad (ONE)
- (United States) Kyle Kingsbury (UFC, KOTC)
- (Japan) Daichi Kitakata (Rizin, Pancrase, DEEP)
- (Japan) Koji Kitao (PRIDE, UFC)
- (Japan) Satoru Kitaoka (Pancrase, Sengoku, DEEP, DREAM)
- (Slovakia) Ľudovít Klein (UFC)
- (United States) Drakkar Klose (UFC)
- (Armenia) Kevin Knabjian (Shooto, WEC, Bellator)
- (United States) Jason Knight (Titan FC, UFC)
- (United States) William Knight (UFC)
- (Turkey) Fatih Kocamis (M-1, PRIDE, RINGS)
- (United States) Erik Koch (WEC, UFC)
- (Japan) Junya Kodo (Shooto, DREAM, VTJ)
- (Japan) Toru Koga (Shooto)
- (United States) Brad Kohler (UFC, RINGS, DEEP)
- (Japan) Hiroyuki Kojima (Shooto)
- (United States) Naoto Kojima (Shooto)
- (Japan) Shinichi Kojima (Shooto, OneFC)
- (Poland) Szymon Kołecki (Babilon MMA, KSW)
- (United States) John Kolosci (UFC, Strikeforce, Bellator, XFC)
- (Japan) Yuki Kondo (Pancrase, PRIDE, UFC, DEEP, Sengoku)
- (France) Cheick Kongo (UFC, Bellator, RINGS)
- (Thailand) Kritsada Kongsrichai (OneFC)
- (Japan) Masayuki Kono (Pancrase)
- (United States) Cole Konrad (Bellator)
- (Russia) Andrei Kopylov (PRIDE, RINGS)
- (Russia) Roman Kopylov (UFC)
- (Russia) Andrey Koreshkov (Bellator)
- (Japan) Tsuyoshi Kosaka (RINGS, PRIDE, UFC, Pancrase, DEEP)
- (United States) Josh Koscheck (UFC, Bellator)
- (Japan) Hiroki Kotani (Shooto)
- (Japan) Naoyuki Kotani (Pancrase, PRIDE, UFC)
- (United States) Steve Kozola (Bellator, LFA, BAMMA, WSOF)
- (United States) Derrick Krantz (UFC, Bellator, LFA)
- (Poland) Kamil Kraska (FEN MMA, Babilon MMA)
- (United States) James Krause (Bellator, WEC, Titan FC, UFC)
- (Germany) Pascal Krauss (UFC, CWFC, Shooto)
- (Bulgaria) Emil Kristev (RINGS)
- (Poland) Miłosz Kruk (FEN MMA)
- (Sweden) Jörgen Kruth (K-1, UFC)
- (Ukraine) Nikita Krylov (UFC, M-1)
- (Canada) Mariusz Książkiewicz (AFC, LFA, KSW)
- (Poland) Piotr Kuberski (KSW, FEN MMA, UAE Warriors)
- (Japan) Yuta Kubo (Rizin)
- (Japan) Misaki Kubota (Shooto)
- (Poland) Dawid Kuczmarski (KSW, Babilon MMA)
- (Belarus) Alexei Kudin (Bellator, M-1, Shooto)
- (Netherlands) Michael Kuiper (UFC, Titan FC)
- (Finland) Anton Kuivanen (UFC, K-1 Hero's, Shooto)
- (Croatia) Mladen Kujundžić (Babilon MMA)
- (Japan) Takasuke Kume (Shooto, Pancrase, Rizin, ONE)
- (Russia) Alexey Kunchenko (UFC, PFL, M-1)
- (Russia) Rizvan Kuniev (UFC, PFL)
- (Japan) Kiichi Kunimoto (UFC, Pancrase)
- (Japan) Kiuma Kunioku (Sengoku, DEEP, Pancrase, K-1 Hero's)
- (Russia) Ramazan Kuramagomedov (Bellator, PFL, ACB)
- (Japan) Masakazu Kuramochi (DEEP, Pancrase, Shooto)
- (Georgia (country)) Eldar Kurtanidze (PRIDE)
- (Japan) Kazuhiro Kusayanagi (Shooto, VTJ)
- (Japan) Takuya Kuwabara (Shooto)
- (South Korea) Won-il Kwon (ONE)
- (United States) Mike Kyle (KOTC, WEC, UFC, Pancrase, Strikeforce, WSOF)

== L ==
- (Myanmar) Aung La Nsang (Bellator, CFFC, OneFC)
- (United States) Josh LaBerge (Bellator, Strikeforce)
- (Poland) Denis Labryga (Babilon MMA)
- (United States) Ryan LaFlare (UFC)
- (Israel) Noad Lahat (UFC, Bellator, BAMMA)
- (United States) Tim Lajcik (UFC, Pancrase, WFA, RINGS)
- (United States) Ricardo Lamas (UFC, WEC)
- (United States) Jason Lambert (KOTC, UFC, WEC, Bellator)
- (United States) Nate Landwehr (UFC)
- (United States) Austen Lane (UFC)
- (France) Taylor Lapilus (UFC)
- (Canada) Chad Laprise (UFC, Bellator)
- (United States) Anthony Lapsley (Bellator, ShoXC, KOTC, UFC)
- (United States) Lorenz Larkin (Strikeforce, UFC, Bellator)
- (United States) Jeremy Larsen (UFC)
- (United States) Brock Larson (UFC, WEC, KOTC, OneFC)
- (United States) Bobby Lashley (Strikeforce, MFC, SFL, Bellator, Titan FC)
- (Sweden) Ilir Latifi (UFC)
- (Philippines) Ole Laursen (OneFC, K-1 Hero's, AOW)
- (Philippines) Jenel Lausa (UFC)
- (United States) Dan Lauzon (Affliction, UFC, WSOF)
- (United States) Joe Lauzon (UFC)
- (United States) Cody Law (Bellator)
- (United States) Muhammed Lawal (Sengoku, M-1, Strikeforce, Bellator)
- (United States) Robbie Lawler (EliteXC, IFL, KOTC, PRIDE, Strikeforce, UFC)
- (United States) Tom Lawlor (UFC)
- (United States) Justin Lawrence (Strikeforce, UFC)
- (United States) Eric Lawson (Strikeforce)
- (Sweden) Jani Lax (Shooto, K-1 Hero's, M-1)
- (Tunisia) Mounir Lazzez (UFC)
- (United States) Cung Le (Strikeforce, UFC)
- (United States) Thanh Le (ONE, LFA, UFC)
- (France) Jérôme Le Banner (K-1, K-1 Hero's)
- (United States) Jordan Leavitt (UFC)
- (United States) Chris Leben (UFC, WEC)
- (France) Mickaël Lebout (UFC, BAMMA, CWFC, M-1)
- (United States) Claudio Ledesma (Bellator)
- (United States) Justin Ledet (UFC, Legacy)
- (Canada) Christian Lee (ONE)
- (United States) Kevin Lee (UFC)
- (England) Vaughan Lee (UFC, CWFC, Cage Rage)
- (England) Dave Legeno (Cage Rage)
- (United States) Ricky Legere (Bellator, Strikeforce, KOTC, TPF)
- (Poland) Mateusz Legierski (Oktagon MMA, KSW)
- (United States) Christophe Leininger (UFC)
- (Brazil) Leonardo Leite (LFA, Bellator)
- (Brazil) Thales Leites (Shooto, Jungle Fight, MFC, UFC)
- (United States) Nik Lentz (UFC)
- (United States) Anthony Leone (Bellator, Strikeforce, WEC)
- (Brazil) Fabio Leopoldo (Pancrase, IFL)
- (United States) Kimo Leopoldo (Cage Rage, K-1, PRIDE, UFC, WFA)
- (Poland) Bartosz Leśko (KSW, ACA, FEN MMA)
- (United States) Brock Lesnar (K-1 Hero's, UFC)
- (United States) Justin Levens (†) (PFC, IFL, WEC, UFC)
- (United States) Marcus LeVesseur (UFC, Adrenaline MMA)
- (United States) Bevon Lewis (UFC, LFA, PFL)
- (United States) Derrick Lewis (LFA, Bellator, UFC)
- Alfonso Leyva (UWC Mexico, LFA)
- (China) Jingliang Li (UFC, Legend FC, AOW)
- (France) Jess Liaudin (Pancrase, KOTC, Cage Rage, UFC)
- (United States) Chuck Liddell (UFC, PRIDE, Golden Boy)
- (Japan) Jushin Thunder Liger (Pancrase)
- (United States) Scott Lighty (Strikeforce, ShoXC, PFC)
- (South Korea) Hyun Gyu Lim (DEEP, M-1, UFC)
- (Brazil) André Lima (UFC)
- (Brazil) Daniel Lima (Shooto)
- (Brazil) Dhiego Lima (MFC, XFC, UFC, Titan FC)
- (Brazil) Douglas Lima (Bellator, MFC, KOTC)
- (Brazil) Felipe Lima (UFC, Oktagon, Brave CF)
- (Brazil) Rodrigo Lima (†) (Bellator)
- (United States) Matt Lindland (Cage Rage, IFL, UFC, WFA, Affliction, Strikeforce, KSW)
- (United States) Jake Lindsey (Titan FC, UFC)
- (Brazil) John Lineker (UFC, Jungle Fight, Shooto)
- (United States) Austin Lingo (UFC, LFA)
- (Brazil) Philipe Lins (Bellator)
- (United States) Dean Lister (KOTC, MFC, PRIDE, UFC)
- (Spain) Abner Lloveras (M-1, Shooto)
- (Netherlands) Brian Lo-A-Njoe (M-1, Pride)
- (United States) John Lober (KOTC, UFC, Pancrase)
- (Russia) Artem Lobov (UFC, CWFC)
- (Canada) David Loiseau (EliteXC, UFC, TPF, WSOF)
- (Philippines) Stephen Loman (Brave CF, OneFC)
- (Cuba) Hector Lombard (Bellator, EliteXC, UFC, DEEP, PRIDE)
- (Poland) Tymoteusz Łopaczyk (KSW, Babilon MMA, FEN MMA)
- (Brazil) Diego Lopes (LUX, UFC)
- (United States) Benito Lopez (UFC, Bellator)
- (Cameroon) Fernand Lopez (M-1, Shooto)
- (United States) Gustavo Lopez (UFC, Bellator)
- (United States) Matthew Lopez (UFC, KOTC, RFA)
- (England) Brendan Loughnane (PFL, UFC, ACB)
- (United States) Nate Loughran (UFC, TPF, PFC)
- (United States) Rafael Lovato Jr. (Bellator)
- (United States) Ian Loveland (UFC, KOTC, IFL, VTJ, TPF)
- (United States) Waylon Lowe (UFC, Bellator, XFC, WSOF)
- (United States) Chris Lozano (Bellator)
- (Brazil) Cleber Luciano (Bellator)
- (United States) Duane Ludwig (K-1, KOTC, Sengoku, Strikeforce, UFC)
- Santiago Luna (UWC Mexico, UFC)
- (Democratic Republic of the Congo) Dalcha Lungiambula (UFC)
- (Romania) Alexandru Lungu (PRIDE, Cage Rage, K-1)
- (Brazil) Vicente Luque (UFC)
- (United States) Travis Lutter (Cage Rage, MFC, UFC)
- (United States) Chris Lytle (Cage Rage, Pancrase, UFC, WEC)

== M ==
- (South Korea) Dong Hyun Ma (UFC)
- (Brazil) John Macapá (Bellator, Rizin, ACB, UFC)
- (Brazil) William Macário (UFC)
- (Canada) Jason MacDonald (KOTC, MFC, UFC)
- (Canada) Rob MacDonald (UFC, MFC)
- (Canada) Rory MacDonald (UFC, KOTC, Bellator)
- (Brazil) Gustavo Machado (Shooto, IFL, Pancrase, KOTC, DEEP, RINGS)
- (Republic of Ireland) Ian Machado Garry (UFC, CWFC)
- (Russia) Murad Machaev (Bellator)
- (Brazil) Lyoto Machida (NJPW, Jungle Fight, K-1, K-1 Hero's, WFA, UFC, Bellator)
- (United States) War Machine (UFC, BAMMA, XFC, Bellator, TPF)
- (United States) Anthony Macias (PRIDE, UFC)
- (Sweden) Reza Madadi (UFC)
- (United States) Jon Madsen (UFC)
- (Denmark) Mark Madsen (UFC, CWFC)
- (Japan) Akira Maeda (RINGS)
- (Japan) Yoshiro Maeda (Pancrase, PRIDE, WEC, DREAM, DEEP, Sengoku)
- (Brazil) Leonardo Mafra (UFC)
- (Brazil) Caio Magalhães (UFC, Shooto)
- (Brazil) Vinicius Magalhães (Strikeforce)
- (Brazil) Vinny Magalhães (M-1, UFC, Titan FC)
- (United States) Neil Magny (UFC)
- (Russia) Magomed Magomedkerimov (PFL)
- (Germany) Abusupiyan Magomedov (UFC, PFL, KSW)
- (Russia) Magomed Magomedov (Bellator)
- (Russia) Rashid Magomedov (M-1, UFC)
- (Russia) Ruslan Magomedov (Bellator, UFC)
- (Russia) Sharabutdin Magomedov (UFC)
- (Russia) Khasan Magomedsharipov (Bellator)
- (Russia) Zabit Magomedsharipov (UFC, ACB)
- (England) John Maguire (BAMMA, Cage Rage, UFC, CWFC, KSW)
- (Brazil) Demian Maia (UFC)
- (Brazil) Eduardo Maiorino (K-1)
- (Georgia (country)) Levan Makashvili (UFC, ACB)
- (Canada) John Makdessi (UFC)
- (Russia) Islam Makhachev (UFC, M-1)
- (United States) Zach Makovsky (ShoXC, EliteXC, DEEP, M-1, Bellator, Brave CF, UFC, ACB)
- (Brazil) Fábio Maldonado (UFC)
- (Argentina) Nazareno Malegarie (Bellator, Jungle Fight)
- (Australia) Jacob Malkoun (UFC)
- (Canada) Mike Malott (UFC)
- (Russia) Anatoly Malykhin (ONE)
- (United States) Nick Mamalis (Bellator)
- (United States) Nate Maness (UFC)
- (Brazil) Raush Manfio (PFL, Titan FC)
- (Netherlands) Melvin Manhoef (Cage Rage, K-1 Hero's, Strikeforce, DREAM, OneFC, KSW, Bellator)
- (England) Ronnie Mann (Bellator, Cage Rage, Sengoku, CWFC)
- (Netherlands) Andre Mannaart (Shooto, RINGS)
- (England) Jimi Manuwa (BAMMA, UFC)
- (Brazil) Cristiano Marcello (UFC, PRIDE)
- (Peru) Daniel Marcos (UFC)
- (Brazil) Ronny Markes (Shooto, UFC, WSOF)
- (United States) Rory Markham (IFL, Adrenaline MMA, UFC)
- (United States) Nate Marquardt (Pancrase, Strikeforce, UFC)
- (Brazil) Danilo Marques (PFL, UFC)
- (United States) Julian Marquez (UFC)
- (United States) Carmelo Marrero (WEC, UFC, Bellator, XFC, IFL)
- (United States) Doug Marshall (Bellator, SFL, WEC, PFC, TPF)
- (United States) Eliot Marshall (UFC)
- (Wales) Jack Marshman (BAMMA, CWFC, UFC)
- (United States) Anthony Rocco Martin (UFC)
- (United States) Terry Martin (Strikeforce, WEC, KOTC, Affliction, UFC, Adrenaline MMA, MFC, KSW)
- (United States) Tony Martin (UFC)
- (United States) Alonzo Martinez (Bellator, Adrenaline MMA, Titan FC, Strikeforce)
- (United States) Danny Martinez (XFC, WEC, TPF, UFC)
- (Mexico) David Martínez (Combate Americas, UFC)
- (United States) Henry Martinez (Bellator, UFC)
- (United States) Jesus Martinez (Bellator)
- (United States) Jonathan Martinez (UFC)
- (United States) Poppies Martinez (Bellator, WEC, PFC, TPF)
- (United States) Rad Martinez (Bellator, KOTC)
- (Guam) Roque Martinez (UFC, Rizin, DEEP)
- (United States) Ryan Martinez (Bellator)
- (United States) Will Martinez (Bellator)
- (Brazil) Adriano Martins (Jungle Fight, Strikeforce, UFC)
- (Brazil) Lucas Martins (Jungle Fight, UFC)
- (Brazil) Wágner "Zuluzinho" da Conceição Martins (K-1 Hero's, CWFC, PRIDE)
- (United States) Bristol Marunde (UFC, Strikeforce, M-1, IFL, Titan FC)
- (United States) Travis Marx (Bellator)
- (United States) Daniel Mason-Straus (Bellator)
- (United States) Mike Massenzio (UFC, IFL)
- (United States) Jameel Massouh (Bellator, KOTC, Pancrase, WEC, Adrenaline MMA)
- (United States) Jorge Masvidal (Bellator, Sengoku, Strikeforce, UFC)
- (Poland) Michał Materla (KSW)
- (Japan) Tateki Matsuda (UFC, Bellator, Pancrase)
- (Japan) Daijiro Matsui (KOTC, Cage Rage, PRIDE, Pancrase, DEEP, AOW)
- (Japan) Mitsuo Matsumoto (Pancrase, Shooto)
- (Japan) Ryota Matsune (Shooto)
- (Japan) Naoki Matsushita (Shooto, DEEP, Pride)
- (Japan) Hiroaki Matsutani (Shooto)
- (United States) A.J. Matthews (Bellator, Strikeforce)
- (Australia) Jake Matthews (UFC)
- (Belarus) Vladimir Matyushenko (VTJ, Jungle Fight, Affliction, IFL, UFC, Bellator)
- (United States) Nick Maximov (UFC, LFA)
- (United States) Don'Tale Mayes (UFC)
- (United States) Gray Maynard (UFC)
- (Nicaragua) Ricardo Mayorga (WSOF)
- (United States) Michael McBride (UFC, Bellator)
- (United States) Ian McCall (WEC, TPF, UFC)
- (United States) Charles McCarthy (KOTC, UFC)
- (United States) Sean McCorkle (KOTC, UFC, KSW)
- (United States) Kris McCray (UFC, Bellator, WSOF)
- (United States) Tamdan McCrory (UFC, Bellator)
- (United States) Rob McCullough (Bellator, WEC, DREAM, WFA, TPF)
- (United States) Justin McCully (Pancrase, RINGS, Jungle Fight, UFC)
- (United States) Bubba McDaniel (UFC, Bellator, ShoXC, EliteXC, KOTC)
- (United States) Michael McDonald (UFC, WEC, PFC, TPF)
- (England) Michael McDonald (K-1)
- (United States) Adam McDonough (Bellator, KOTC)
- (United States) Drew McFedries (UFC, Shooto, Titan FC)
- (England) Liam McGeary (Bellator)
- (United States) Court McGee (UFC)
- (United States) Gan McGee (PRIDE, UFC, WEC, XFC)
- (United States) Marcus McGhee (LFA, UFC)
- (Republic of Ireland) Conor McGregor (CWFC, UFC)
- (United States) A. J. McKee (Bellator)
- (United Kingdom) Rhys McKee (UFC, PFL)
- (United States) Cody McKenzie (UFC)
- (United States) Tim McKenzie (UFC, WEC, Pancrase, TPF)
- (United States) Terrance McKinney (UFC)
- (South Africa) Garreth McLellan (UFC)
- (England) James McSweeney (Cage Rage, BAMMA, UFC, OneFC)
- (United States) Jackson McVey (UFC, LFA)
- (United States) Tim Means (KOTC, UFC)
- (United States) Yancy Medeiros (UFC, Strikeforce)
- (Serbia) Uroš Medić (UFC)
- (Norway) Emil Weber Meek (UFC, KSW)
- (United States) Gerald Meerschaert (UFC, KOTC)
- (United States) Derrick Mehmen (Adrenaline MMA, Strikeforce, Bellator, WSOF)
- (Canada) Jordan Mein (KOTC, Strikeforce, UFC)
- (United States) Brian Melancon (UFC, Strikeforce, Bellator)
- (United States) Gilbert Melendez (WEC, Strikeforce, UFC, Shooto, PRIDE)
- (Brazil) Fabio Mello (Shooto, Jungle Fight, Bellator, PRIDE, DEEP, Titan FC, WSOF)
- (United States) Chad Mendes (PFC, TPF, WEC, UFC)
- (United States) Alonzo Menifield (Bellator, LFA, UFC)
- (El Salvador) Ivan Menjivar (UFC, IFL, KOTC, K-1 Hero's, MFC)
- (United States) Dave Menne (Shooto, RINGS, UFC, DEEP, Cage Rage, Bellator)
- (United States) Ray Mercer (CFFC, Adrenaline MMA)
- (United States) Bryce Meredith (Bellator, LFA, PFL)
- (Canada) Jonathan Meunier (UFC)
- (United States) Yaotzin Meza (UFC)
- (United States) Guy Mezger (Pancrase, PRIDE, KOTC, UFC)
- (Greece) Andreas Michailidis (UFC, Titan FC, Bellator)
- (Poland) Igor Michaliszyn (KSW)
- (United States) David Michaud (UFC, LFA, PFL)
- (Brazil) Thiago Michel (Bellator)
- (Japan) Taka Michinoku (Pancrase)
- (Japan) Wataru Miki (Pancrase, Shooto, DEEP)
- (United States) Pat Miletich (Adrenaline MMA, IFL, RINGS, UFC)
- (United States) Curtis Millender (UFC, Bellator, PFL)
- (United States) Cole Miller (UFC, Shooto)
- (United States) Dan Miller (UFC, IFL)
- (United States) Henry "Sentoryu Henri" Miller (†) (Cage Rage, PRIDE, Pancrase, DEEP)
- (United States) Jason Miller (UFC, Strikeforce, DREAM, WFA, WEC)
- (United States) Jim Miller (UFC, IFL)
- (United States) Phillip Miller (UFC)
- (England) Che Mills (BAMMA, Cage Rage, M-1, UFC, CWFC)
- (United States) Adam Milstead (UFC, KOTC)
- (Brazil) Alberto Mina (UFC)
- (Russia) Vitaly Minakov (M-1, Bellator)
- (China) Zhang Mingyang (UFC)
- (United States) Darrick Minner (UFC, LFA)
- (Japan) Ikuhisa Minowa (DREAM, K-1 Hero's, Pancrase, PRIDE, DEEP, SFL)
- (United States) Stipe Miocic (UFC)
- (United States) Frank Mir (UFC)
- (Brazil) Vitor Miranda (Shooto, K-1, UFC)
- (Moldova) Valeriu Mircea (M-1 Global, Bellator, RXF, Brave CF, KSW)
- (Russia) Rasul Mirzaev
- (Japan) Kazuo Misaki (PRIDE, Sengoku, Pancrase, DEEP, Strikeforce)
- (Japan) Dokonjonosuke Mishima (Shooto, PRIDE, UFC, DEEP)
- (United States) Bryce Mitchell (UFC)
- (England) Danny Mitchell (UFC, Bellator, ACB, CWFC, BAMMA)
- (United States) David Mitchell (UFC, TPF)
- (Armenia) Roman Mitichyan (UFC)
- (United States) Matt Mitrione (UFC, Bellator)
- (Japan) Eiji Mitsuoka (KOTC, PRIDE, DEEP, Shooto, Sengoku, DREAM, UFC)
- (Japan) Hiromitsu Miura (Pancrase, K-1 Hero's, WEC, DEEP)
- (United States) Patchy Mix (Bellator, UFC, Rizin)
- (Japan) Takeshi Miyanaga (Shooto)
- (Japan) Kazuyuki Miyata (DREAM, K-1, K-1 Hero's, DEEP, RINGS)
- (Japan) Takeya Mizugaki (Shooto, WEC, UFC, ACB)
- (Japan) Eiji Mizuno (Shooto)
- (Japan) Tatsuya Mizuno (K-1, Pancrase, M-1, DREAM, OneFC)
- (United States) Steve Mocco (WSOF)
- (United States) Bobby Moffett (UFC, PFL, LFA)
- (Iran) Mohsen Mohammadseifi (Brave CF, PFL)
- (United States) Nate Mohr (UFC, KOTC)
- (Brazil) Renato Moicano (UFC)
- (Ukraine) Sasha Moisa (KSW, Babilon MMA)
- (Brazil) Thiago Moisés (UFC)
- (United Kingdom) Muhammad Mokaev (UFC, Brave CF)
- (Russia) Mikhail Mokhnatkin (ACB, PFL)
- (Australia) Ashkan Mokhtarian (UFC)
- (Russia) Valentin Moldavsky (PFL, Bellator)
- (United States) Jeff Molina (UFC, LFA)
- (Japan) Hidetaka Monma (RINGS, Pancrase, DEEP, K-1 Hero's, DREAM)
- (United States) Jeff Monson (UFC, Strikeforce, PRIDE, DREAM, M-1, Sengoku, CWFC)
- (United States) Darrell Montague (VTJ, TPF, UFC)
- (Mexico) Augusto Montaño (UFC, Jungle Fight)
- (United States) James Moontasri (UFC)
- (United States) Homer Moore (IFL, WEC, UFC)
- (Northern Ireland) Karl Moore (Bellator)
- (United States) Nate Moore (Strikeforce)
- (Brazil) Adriano Moraes (ONE, Shooto)
- (Brazil) Marlon Moraes (WSOF, XFC)
- (Brazil) Sergio Moraes (Jungle Fight, Bellator, UFC)
- (Brazil) Sheymon Moraes (UFC, PFL, WSOF)
- (United States) John Moraga (UFC)
- (Brazil) Ricardo Morais (RINGS, PRIDE, Jungle Fight)
- (United States) Albert Morales (UFC, Bellator, WSOF, BAMMA)
- (United States) Joseph Morales (UFC, CWFC, WSOF)
- (Ecuador) Michael Morales (UWC Mexico, UFC)
- (Venezuela) Omar Morales (UFC)
- (United States) Vince Morales (UFC, Bellator, KOTC)
- (United States) Christian Morecraft (UFC)
- (Brazil) Joe Moreira (UFC)
- (Brazil) Vinicius Moreira (UFC, Jungle Fight)
- Brandon Moreno (UWC Mexico, LFA, UFC)
- (United States) Sammy Morgan (UFC, Shooto, Strikeforce, ShoXC, KOTC)
- (Lithuania) Remigijus Morkevicius (Shooto, K-1 Hero's)
- (United States) Alex Morono (UFC, LFA)
- (Russia) Sergey Morozov (UFC, M-1)
- (United States) Anthony Morrison (Bellator, CFFC, WEC)
- (United States) Tommy Morrison (†)
- (United States) Johnnie Morton (K-1 Hero's)
- (United States) Harry Moskowitz (UFC)
- (Brazil) Nikolas Motta (UFC, CFFC, Shooto)
- (Brazil) Robson Moura (Shooto)
- (Netherlands) Gegard Mousasi (Strikeforce, DREAM, DEEP, MFC, Pride, K-1, CWFC, UFC, Bellator)
- (England) Dan Movahedi (BAMMA, Cage Rage)
- (United States) Kin Moy (Bellator)
- (Democratic Republic of the Congo) Christian M'Pumbu (Bellator, DEEP, KSW, M-1)
- (United States) Mike Mucitelli (Bellator)
- (China) Su Mudaerji (UFC)
- (United States) Belal Muhammad (Bellator, UFC)
- (United States) Quinn Mulhern (UFC, KOTC, Strikeforce)
- (Australia) Jamie Mullarkey (UFC)
- (Brazil) Pedro Munhoz (UFC)
- (Brazil) André Muniz (UFC)
- (United States) Mark Muñoz (PFC, WEC, UFC)
- (United States) Johnny Muñoz Jr. (UFC)
- (United States) Andy Murad (Bellator, KOTC)
- (Uzbekistan) Makhmud Muradov (UFC, Oktagon)
- (Japan) Takaharu Murahama (Shooto, DEEP)
- (Japan) Kazunari Murakami (Pride, Jungle Fight)
- (Japan) Ryuichi Murata (DEEP, Pride)
- (Japan) Akihiro Murayama (Pancrase, Shooto)
- (Japan) Shinya Murofushi (Shooto)
- (England) Lerone Murphy (UFC)
- (England) Lee Murray (Cage Rage, UFC)
- (Russia) Azamat Murzakanov (UFC, ACB)
- (Russia) Shamil Musaev (PFL)
- (Azerbaijan) Tofiq Musayev (Rizin, Bellator)
- (Sweden) Nico Musoke (UFC)
- (Russia) Magomed Mustafaev (UFC, M-1)
- (United States) Elvis Mutapčić (UFC, MFC, ACB, WSOF, SF)

== N ==
- (Japan) Yuichiro Nagashima (Pancrase, Rizin)
- (Japan) Katsuhiko Nagata (K-1, K-1 Hero's, Pancrase, DREAM)
- (Japan) Yuji Nagata
- (Japan) Yoshitaka Naito (Shooto, ONE)
- (Japan) Yuki Nakai (VTJ, Shooto)
- (Japan) Takashi Nakakura (Shooto)
- (Japan) Daisuke Nakamura (PRIDE, Strikeforce, M-1, Cage Rage, DREAM, DEEP, K-1 Hero's)
- (Japan) Hiroshi Nakamura (Bellator, DEEP, Shooto)
- (Japan) Kazuhiro Nakamura (PRIDE, UFC, Sengoku, DREAM, DEEP)
- (Japan) Keita Nakamura (Shooto, UFC, DREAM, Sengoku, VTJ, DEEP)
- (Japan) Rinya Nakamura (UFC)
- (Japan) Shinsuke Nakamura (K-1, Jungle Fight)
- (Japan) Jutaro Nakao (DEEP, PRIDE, UFC, Shooto)
- (Japan) Yoshihiro Nakao (K-1, K-1 Hero's, PRIDE, Sengoku)
- (Japan) Takumi Nakayama (Shooto, KOTC, DEEP, Pancrase, VTJ)
- (Tajikistan) Muhammad Naimov (UFC)
- (United States) Tyson Nam (EliteXC, Shooto, KOTC, Bellator, WSOF)
- (South Korea) Yui Chul Nam (UFC, M-1)
- (Japan) Yasuhito Namekawa (PRIDE, RINGS, DEEP)
- (New Zealand) Antz Nansen (Sengoku)
- (Thailand) Yodsanan Sor Nanthachai (OneFC)
- (Mongolia) Jadamba Narantungalag (Sengoku, K-1, AOW, OneFC)
- (England) Nad Narimani (UFC, CWFC)
- (Poland) Tomasz Narkun (M-1, KSW)
- (Japan) Masayuki Naruse (Pancrase, Jungle Fight, K-1, RINGS)
- (United States) Roger Narvaez (UFC)
- (Brazil) Allan Nascimento (†) (UFC, Rizin)
- (Brazil) Rodrigo Nascimento (UFC)
- (United States) Bobby Nash (UFC, Bellator, XFC)
- (Japan) Tenshin Nasukawa (Rizin)
- (Poland) Pawel Nastula (PRIDE, KSW, Sengoku)
- (Russia) Timofey Nastyukhin (ONE, ACB)
- (Brazil) Rafael Natal (UFC)
- (Austria) Ismail Naurdiev (UFC)
- (Brazil) Marcio Navarro (Bellator, Titan FC, KOTC)
- (Brazil) Renê Nazare (Bellator)
- (Cameroon) Tafon Nchukwi (UFC, CFFC)
- (United States) Dustin Neace (UFC, Bellator, Strikeforce)
- (United States) Geoff Neal (UFC)
- (Bulgaria) Stanislav Nedkov (Shooto, Pancrase, Sengoku, UFC)
- (United States) Josh Neer (UFC, Bellator, IFL)
- (Romania) Nicolae Negumereanu (UFC)
- (United States) Steve Nelmark (UFC)
- (Iceland) Gunnar Nelson (UFC, BAMMA, Cage Contender)
- (Canada) Kyle Nelson (UFC)
- (United States) Roy Nelson (IFL, EliteXC, UFC)
- (United States) Shane Nelson (UFC, Shooto, MFC)
- (Russia) Vadim Nemkov (Bellator)
- (Russia) Viktor Nemkov (M-1)
- (Brazil) Antonio Braga Neto (UFC, Sengoku, AOW)
- (United States) Nick Newell (XFC, WSOF)
- (United States) Journey Newson (UFC)
- (Canada) Carlos Newton (VTJ, Shooto, PRIDE, UFC, IFL, K-1 Hero's)
- (United States) Emanuel Newton (Bellator, MFC, IFL, KOTC, WEC)
- (Cameroon) Alain Ngalani (OneFC)
- (Cameroon) Francis Ngannou (UFC, PFL)
- (United States) Ben Nguyen (UFC)
- (Australia) Martin Nguyen (ONE)
- (United States) Alex Nicholson (UFC, Legacy)
- (United States) Bo Nickal (UFC)
- (Brazil) Matheus Nicolau (UFC, Shooto)
- (Poland) Piotr Niedzielski (Babilon MMA, Bellator, UAE Warriors)
- (Finland) Tom Niinimäki (Shooto, CWFC, Titan FC, UFC)
- (United States) Ramsey Nijem (UFC)
- (Netherlands) Hans Nijman (RINGS, PRIDE)
- (Sweden) Mats Nilsson (Shooto, CWFC, UFC)
- (China) Guangyou Ning (UFC, AOW)
- (Japan) Yosuke Nishijima (PRIDE, K-1)
- (Japan) Akiyo Nishiura (DEEP, Shooto, DREAM, VTJ)
- (Japan) Takashi Nishizawa (Shooto)
- (Nigeria) Anthony Njokuani (WEC, UFC)
- (United States) Chidi Njokuani (UFC)
- (United States) Jacob Noe (Bellator, Strikeforce)
- (Brazil) Alexandre Franca Nogueira (K-1 Hero's, Shooto, WEC, VTJ)
- (Brazil) Antônio Rodrigo Nogueira (UFC, PRIDE, RINGS, Affliction, Jungle Fight, Sengoku, DEEP)
- (Brazil) Luis Nogueira (Shooto, Bellator)
- (Australia) Kyle Noke (UFC, EliteXC)
- (Australia) Tom Nolan (UFC)
- (Japan) Kimihito Nonaka (Shooto)
- (United States) K. J. Noons (EliteXC, ShoXC, DREAM, Strikeforce, UFC)
- (United States) Sage Northcutt (Legacy, UFC)
- (United States) Reggie Northrup
- (South Africa) Jan Nortje (K-1, K-1 Hero's, PRIDE, DREAM, Strikeforce)
- (Hungary) Norbert Növényi Jr. (Hexagone MMA, Bellator MMA)
- (United States) Phillipe Nover (Combat Zone, UFC, Bellator)
- (China) Shayilan Nuerdanbieke (UFC)
- (Brazil) Diego Nunes (UFC, WEC, Shooto, Bellator)
- (Russia) Abubakar Nurmagomedov (UFC)
- (Russia) Khabib Nurmagomedov (UFC, M-1)
- (Russia) Said Nurmagomedov (UFC, ACB)
- (Russia) Umar Nurmagomedov (UFC)
- (Russia) Usman Nurmagomedov (Bellator)
- (Nigeria) Kennedy Nzechukwu (UFC)

== O ==
- (United States) Jake O'Brien (UFC, DREAM, WEC)
- (Japan) Haruo Ochi (Shooto, DEEP, Rizin)
- (United States) Sean O'Connell (MFC, UFC)
- (Switzerland) Volkan Oezdemir (Bellator, UFC, Shooto)
- (Japan) Naoya Ogawa (PRIDE)
- (England) Andy Ogle (UFC)
- (United States) Carl Ognibene (PRIDE)
- (Japan) Kenji Ogusu (Shooto)
- (United States) Sean O'Haire (†) (K-1, K-1 Hero's, PRIDE)
- (Japan) Michiyoshi Ohara (PRIDE)
- (Japan) Tomonori Ohara (Shooto)
- (Japan) Masahiro Oishi (DEEP, Pancrase, Shooto)
- (South Korea) Ok Rae-yoon (ONE)
- (Japan) Takayuki "Giant Ochiai" Okada (PRIDE, KOTC, DEEP)
- (Japan) Yushin Okami (K-1 Hero's, Pancrase, M-1, PRIDE, UFC, WSOF)
- (Japan) Koetsu Okazaki (Shooto, OneFC)
- (Japan) Mamoru Okochi (Shooto)
- (Japan) Takayuki Okochi (Shooto)
- (Japan) Yasunori Okuda (Shooto)
- (Japan) Taisuke Okuno (Shooto, Sengoku, DEEP)
- (Ukraine) Alexey Oleinik- (M-1, KSW, Bellator, UFC, YAMMA)
- (Poland) Michał Oleksiejczuk (UFC, FEN MMA)
- (Brazil) Alex Oliveira (UFC)
- (Brazil) Charles Oliveira (UFC, Jungle Fight)
- (Brazil) Rafaello Oliveira (UFC, ShoXC, XFC)
- (Brazil) Vinicius Oliveira (UFC, UAE Warriors)
- (United States) Jordan Oliver (Bellator, PFL)
- (Nigeria) Andy Ologun (K-1, K-1 Hero's, DREAM)
- (Nigeria) Bobby Ologun (K-1, K-1 Hero's)
- (United States) Brian Olsen (WEC)
- (United States) Casey Olson (WEC, PFC, Strikeforce, TPF)
- (United States) Sean O'Malley (UFC, LFA)
- (Poland) Daniel Omielańczuk (UFC, KSW)
- (Japan) Michihiro Omigawa (Cage Rage, DEEP, PRIDE, Shooto, Sengoku, UFC, DREAM)
- (Uganda) David Onama (UFC)
- (Japan) Masaya Onodera (Shooto)
- (Australia) Brendan O'Reilly (UFC)
- (United States) Sam Oropeza (Bellator, Strikeforce)
- (United States) Brian Ortega (UFC)
- (United States) Dustin Ortiz (UFC, Strikeforce, TPF, KOTC)
- (Mexico) Jorge Ortiz (Bellator, Strikeforce, Shooto, KOTC)
- (United States) Tito Ortiz (UFC, Bellator)
- (Japan) Kenji Osawa (DREAM, WEC, Shooto, VTJ)
- (Japan) Shigeki Osawa (Sengoku, RINGS, Shooto, Pancrase, VTJ)
- (Jamaica) Ode' Osbourne (UFC)
- (England) Nick Osipczak (UFC)
- (Japan) Isamu Osugi (Shooto)
- (Japan) Shinobu Ota (Rizin)
- (Japan) Alexander Otsuka (KOTC, PRIDE, RINGS)
- (United States) Zak Ottow (UFC, RFA, KOTC)
- (France) Reda Oudgou (M-1)
- (Japan) Hiromasa Ougikubo (Shooto, Rizin)
- (United States) Sidney Outlaw (Bellator, Titan FC, WSOF)
- (Netherlands) Alistair Overeem (K-1, K-1 Hero's, RINGS, PRIDE, Strikeforce, DREAM, UFC)
- (Netherlands) Valentijn Overeem (K-1, K-1 Hero's, M-1, KSW, RINGS, PRIDE, Pancrase, WFA, Sengoku, Strikeforce)
- (Japan) Shungo Oyama (K-1 Hero's, KOTC, PRIDE, Pancrase, DREAM, RINGS)
- (Turkey) Alptekin Özkiliç (UFC)

== P ==
- (United States) Nick Pace (UFC, WEC, Bellator)
- (United States) Joe Pacheco (Bellator)
- (Philippines) Joshua Pacio (ONE)
- (Finland) Teemu Packalen (UFC)
- (Mexico) Fernando Padilla (LFA, KOTC, UFC)
- (United States) Damacio Page (UFC, WEC, K-1 Hero's, Pancrase, KOTC)
- (England) Michael Page (Bellator, SFL)
- (United States) Dustin Pague (UFC)
- (Brazil) Raulian Paiva (UFC)
- (Brazil) Fredson Paixão (Jungle Fight, Pancrase, DEEP, WEC, UFC)
- (Poland) Bart Palaszewski (IFL, Adrenaline MMA, KOTC, Shooto, WEC, UFC)
- (Hong Kong) Sasha Palatnikov (UFC)
- (Australia) Soa Palelei (UFC, KOTC, PRIDE, Shooto)
- (Brazil) Rousimar Palhares (UFC, WSOF)
- (United States) Lance Palmer (ACB, PFL, WSOF)
- (Peru) Luis Palomino (XFC, Bellator, WSOF)
- (Brazil) Alexandre Pantoja (UFC, RFA, Shooto)
- (France) Norman Paraisy (CWFC, Bellator, M-1)
- (Netherlands) Remco Pardoel (RINGS, Pancrase, Shooto, UFC)
- (Israel) Ido Pariente (K-1 Hero's)
- (United States) Josh Parisian (LFA, KOTC)
- (Armenia) Karo Parisyan (KOTC, UFC, WEC, Bellator)
- (South Korea) Hyun Sung Park (UFC)
- (South Korea) Jun Yong Park (UFC)
- (Northern Ireland) Norman Parke (UFC)
- (England) Mick Parkin (UFC)
- (Denmark) Mikkel Parlo (Bellator)
- (United States) Jordan Parsons (†) (Bellator)
- (Brazil) Jorge Patino (PRIDE, UFC, Jungle Fight, Strikeforce, WSOF)
- (Brazil) Alan Patrick (Jungle Fight, UFC)
- (Canada) Claude Patrick (UFC, IFL, KOTC)
- (United States) Erik Paulson (VTJ, Shooto)
- (Russia) Sergei Pavlovich (UFC)
- (Poland) Paweł Pawlak (KSW, Babilon MMA, UFC)
- (United States) Jonathan Pearce (UFC)
- (England) Ross Pearson (UFC, CWFC)
- (Brazil) André Pederneiras (UFC, VTJ)
- (Italy) Carlo Pedersoli Jr. (UFC, Bellator, CWFC)
- (Australia) Tyson Pedro (UFC)
- (Netherlands) Willie Peeters (Pride, RINGS)
- (United States) Eric Pele (RINGS, KOTC, MFC)
- (United States) Kurt Pellegrino (UFC, WEC, Bellator, Pancrase)
- (Italy) Luis Peña (UFC)
- (Republic of Ireland) Cathal Pendred (CWFC, UFC)
- (United States) B.J. Penn (K-1, K-1 Hero's, UFC)
- (Brazil) Godofredo Pepey (†) (UFC)
- (United States) Robbie Peralta (UFC, Strikeforce)
- (Brazil) Alex Pereira (UFC)
- (Brazil) Michel Pereira (UFC)
- (Mexico) Alejandro Pérez (UFC)
- (United States) Alex Perez (UFC, KOTC, TPF)
- (Mexico) Erik Pérez (WEC, UFC, BAMMA, Bellator)
- (United States) Frankie Perez (UFC, WSOF)
- (Brazil) Markus Perez (UFC, LFA, Jungle Fight)
- (Australia) Anthony Perosh (UFC, Shooto)
- (Brazil) Hernani Perpetuo (ONE, UFC, Shooto)
- (Brazil) Thiago Perpétuo (UFC, Jungle Fight)
- (United States) Mike Perry (UFC)
- (Brazil) Raphael Pessoa (UFC, LFA, ACB)
- (Czech Republic) Viktor Pešta (UFC)
- (United States) Steven Peterson (UFC, LFA, Bellator)
- (Brazil) Vitor Petrino (UFC)
- (United States) Andre Petroski (UFC)
- (Armenia) Armen Petrosyan (UFC)
- (United States) Seth Petruzelli (KOTC, UFC, EliteXC, WEC, BAMMA, Bellator)
- (United States) Anthony Pettis (WEC, UFC)
- (United States) Sergio Pettis (RFA, UFC)
- (United States) Forrest Petz (UFC, KOTC, Adrenaline MMA)
- (United States) Cody Pfister (UFC, Bellator, KOTC)
- (United States) Nam Phan (K-1 Hero's, KOTC, Strikeforce, Sengoku, WEC, UFC, TPF)
- (Cyprus) Costas Philippou (UFC)
- (United States) Aaron Phillips (UFC)
- (Wales) John Phillips (UFC, BAMMA, CWFC, Cage Rage)
- (United States) Kyler Phillips (UFC)
- (United States) Nick Piccininni
- (United States) Adam Piccolotti (Bellator)
- (United States) Vinc Pichel (UFC)
- (England) Brad Pickett (Cage Rage, K-1 Hero's, WEC, UFC)
- (United States) Jamie Pickett (UFC)
- (United States) Aaron Pico (Bellator), PFL, (UFC)
- (United States) Mike Pierce (WEC, UFC)
- (Canada) Sean Pierson (UFC)
- (United States) Domingo Pilarte (UFC, LFA)
- (England) Paddy Pimblett (UFC, CWFC)
- (United States) Daniel Pineda (UFC, Bellator, EliteXC)
- (Peru) Jesus Pinedo (PFL, UFC)
- (Portugal) Mario Pinto (UFC)
- (Brazil) Patricio Pitbull (Bellator)
- (Brazil) Patricky Pitbull (Bellator)
- (United States) Maki Pitolo (UFC, Bellator)
- (United States) Craig Pittman (VTJ)
- (Poland) Damian Piwowarczyk (KSW, Babilon MMA, UFC)
- (United States) Mike Plotcheck (PRIDE)
- (United Kingdom) Ross Pointon (UFC)
- (United States) Dustin Poirier (WEC, UFC)
- (Croatia) Igor Pokrajac (UFC, Jungle Fight, K-1, KSW)
- (United States) Mike Polchlopek
- (Mexico) Marco Polo Reyes (UFC, LUX)
- (Argentina) Santiago Ponzinibbio (UFC)
- (Russia) Oleg Popov (PFL)
- (United States) Parker Porter (UFC, Bellator)
- (Australia) Callan Potter (UFC)
- (South Africa) Ruan Potts (UFC)
- (United States) Devin Powell (UFC, Bellator, WSOF)
- (Poland) Marcin Prachnio (UFC, ONE)
- (Brazil) Wagner Prado (UFC, KSW)
- (South Africa) Trevor Prangley (MFC, Strikeforce, UFC, KOTC, Bellator, DREAM, SFL)
- (Brazil) Carlo Prater (MFC, PFC, VTJ, WEC, UFC)
- (Brazil) Carlos Prates (UFC, LFA, ONE)
- (Brazil) Michel Prazeres (UFC, Jungle Fight, Shooto)
- (Canada) Kyle Prepolec (UFC, Bellator)
- (United States) Niko Price (UFC)
- (United States) Brent Primus (Bellator)
- (United States) Eric Prindle (Bellator)
- (Czech Republic) Jiří Procházka (UFC, Rizin)
- (United States) Joe Proctor (UFC)
- (Brazil) Bruno Pucci (OneFC)
- (United States) Daniel Puder (Strikeforce)
- (Poland) Mariusz Pudzianowski (KSW)
- (Peru) Claudio Puelles (UFC)
- (United States) Jens Pulver (IFL, PRIDE, Shooto, UFC, WEC, OneFC, Titan FC)
- (United States) CM Punk (UFC)
- (United States) Joe Pyfer (UFC)
- (United States) Mike Pyle (EliteXC, IFL, Strikeforce, Affliction, MFC, Shooto, WEC, UFC)

== Q ==
- (China) Aori Qileng (UFC)
- (United States) Bao Quach (Strikeforce, ShoXC, WEC, KOTC, Shooto, Affliction, Bellator, M-1)
- (United States) Billy Quarantillo (UFC)
- (United States) Nathan Quarry (KOTC, UFC)
- (United States) Josh Quayhagen (Bellator, LFA)
- (Republic of Ireland) Peter Queally (Bellator, CWFC, BAMMA)
- (Brazil) Vinicius Queiroz (UFC, Bellator)
- (United States) Dan Quinn
- (United States) Ryan Quinn (Bellator, Titan FC)
- Cristian Quiñónez (UWC Mexico, UFC)
- (Mexico) José Alberto Quiñónez (UFC, LUX)

== R ==
- (Russia) Gadzhi Rabadanov (PFL)
- (United States) Benji Radach (UFC, Strikeforce, IFL, WEC, KOTC, EliteXC, MFC, Bellator)
- (Bulgaria) Jordan Radev (UFC, BAMMA, M-1, RINGS, KSW)
- (United States) Ricky Rainey (XFC, Bellator)
- (Kazakhstan) Shavkat Rakhmonov (UFC)
- (Austria) Aleksandar Rakić (UFC)
- (Brazil) Davi Ramos (UFC, Bellator, ACB)
- (Brazil) Luis Ramos (Shooto, DEEP, UFC)
- (Brazil) Ricardo Ramos (LFA, UFC)
- (United States) Kevin Randleman (†) (PRIDE, UFC, Sengoku, Strikeforce)
- (United States) Ed Ratcliff (WEC)
- (United States) Gideon Ray (UFC, IFL, KOTC)
- (United States) Stevie Ray (UFC, PFL, CWFC, BAMMA)
- (Georgia (country)) Levan Razmadze (DEEP)
- (Poland) Mateusz Rębecki (UFC, FEN MMA)
- (Brazil) Rafael Rebello (WEC)
- (United States) J. P. Reese (Bellator, XFC)
- (United States) Zachary Reese (UFC)
- (England) Alex Reid (Pancrase, Cage Rage, BAMMA)
- (United States) Jason Reinhardt (UFC, KOTC)
- (Brazil) Wilson Reis (Bellator, ShoXC, CWFC, UFC)
- (United States) Ben Reiter (Bellator)
- (Croatia) Goran Reljić (UFC, KSW)
- (United States) Chance Rencountre (UFC, Bellator)
- (United States) Dominick Reyes (UFC, LFC, KOTC)
- (Mexico) Yahir Reyes (Bellator)
- (United States) Eric Reynolds (Bellator, XFC)
- (United States) Mike Rhodes (UFC, Bellator, ACB, LFA, CFFC)
- (Brazil) Alexandre Ribeiro (Sengoku)
- (Brazil) Saulo Ribeiro
- (Brazil) Vítor Ribeiro (WFA, Shooto, Cage Rage, K-1 Hero's, DREAM, Strikeforce)
- (Brazil) Will Ribeiro (WEC, Shooto)
- (Argentina) Esteban Ribovics (UFC)
- (United States) Francesco Ricchi
- (Canada) Mike Ricci (Bellator, UFC, Titan FC)
- (United States) Matt Ricehouse (Strikeforce)
- (United States) Mike Richman (Bellator)
- (United States) David Rickels (Bellator)
- (New Zealand) Brad Riddell (UFC)
- (United States) Matt Riddle (Bellator, UFC, Titan FC)
- (United States) Jeremiah Riggs (Bellator, Strikeforce)
- (United States) Joe Riggs (K-1, UFC, WEC, Strikeforce, BFC)
- (United States) Aaron Riley (UFC, PRIDE, IFL, Shooto)
- (United States) Jordan Rinaldi (UFC)
- (Canada) Nick Ring (Bellator, DEEP, UFC)
- (United States) Mike Rio (UFC)
- (United States) Shannon Ritch (PRIDE, WEC, MFC, KOTC, Pancrase, MFC)
- (Chile) Diego Rivas (UFC)
- (United States) Dante Rivera (UFC, Bellator, IFL)
- (United States) Francisco Rivera (UFC, WEC, TPF)
- (Mexico) Irwin Rivera (UFC, Titan FC)
- (United States) Jerome Rivera (UFC, LFA)
- (United States) Jimmie Rivera (KOTC, Bellator, WSOF, Cage Rage)
- (United States) Jorge Rivera (UFC, Cage Rage, CWFC, UFC)
- (Brazil) Pedro Rizzo (PRIDE, UFC, Affliction, M-1)
- (United States) Karl Roberson (UFC)
- (United States) Andre Roberts (UFC, WEC)
- (United States) Daniel Roberts (UFC, Titan FC)
- (England) Danny Roberts (CWFC, UFC)
- (United States) Roosevelt Roberts (UFC)
- (United States) Ryan Roberts (UFC, Bellator)
- (United States) Kenny Robertson (UFC, Bellator, Cage Rage)
- (United States) Alvin Robinson (UFC, Bellator, Titan FC)
- (Brazil) Carlos Eduardo Rocha (UFC)
- (Brazil) Vagner Rocha (Bellator, Strikeforce, UFC)
- (United States) Luke Rockhold (Strikeforce, UFC)
- (United States) Kevin Roddy (Bellator, Strikeforce, M-1)
- (Brazil) Gregory Rodrigues (UFC, LFA)
- (United States) Daniel Rodriguez (UFC)
- (Mexico) Jose "Dos Caras, Jr." Rodríguez (DEEP, PRIDE)
- (United States) Mike Rodríguez (UFC)
- (United States) Ricco Rodriguez (KOTC, PRIDE, UFC, WEC, WFA, IFL, EliteXC, BAMMA, Bellator, YAMMA)
- (Mexico) Imanol Rodríguez (Budo Sento Championship, UFC)
- (Mexico) Ronaldo Rodríguez (LUX, UFC)
- (Mexico) Yair Rodríguez (UFC)
- (Brazil) Marcos Rogério de Lima (UFC, Strikeforce, Shooto)
- (United States) Brett Rogers (Bellator, Strikeforce, EliteXC, Titan FC)
- (United States) Brian Rogers (Bellator, Strikeforce)
- (United States) Shane Roller (WEC, UFC)
- (United States) Jared Rollins (UFC, KOTC)
- (Moldova) Alexander Romanov (UFC)
- (United States) Ricardo Romero (UFC)
- (Cuba) Yoel Romero (UFC, Strikeforce)
- (China) Fan Rong (ONE)
- (Canada) Jesse Ronson (UFC)
- (United States) George Roop (WEC, UFC)
- (Netherlands) Rick Rootlieb (M-1)
- (Netherlands) Rene Rooze (K-1, VTJ)
- (Angola) João Roque (DEEP, Shooto, VTJ, UFC, WFA)
- (United States) Aaron Rosa (UFC, ShoXC, Adrenaline MMA, Strikeforce, Bellator, Titan FC)
- (United States) Charles Rosa (UFC)
- Raul Rosas Jr. (UWC Mexico, UFC)
- (United States) Jake Rosholt (UFC, WEC, Bellator, Titan FC)
- (United States) Jared Rosholt (UFC, Titan FC, WSOF)
- (United States) Kevin Rosier (†) (UFC)
- (United States) Ben Rothwell (M-1, KOTC, IFL, Adrenaline MMA, Affliction, UFC)
- (United States) Rick Roufus (Strikeforce)
- (United States) Khalil Rountree Jr. (UFC, RFA)
- (United States) Chad "Akebono" Rowan (K-1 Hero's)
- (United States) Philip Rowe (UFC)
- (United States) Brandon Royval (UFC)
- (Suriname) Jairzinho Rozenstruik (UFC)
- (Brazil) Mauricio Rua (PRIDE, UFC)
- (Brazil) Murilo Rua (Cage Rage, EliteXC, Strikeforce, PRIDE, DREAM, BAMMA, Shooto)
- (Brazil) Marco Ruas (IFL, PRIDE, UFC)
- (Poland) Robert Ruchała (KSW, UFC)
- (Ukraine) Vladyslav Rudnev (Brave CF, Rizin)
- (United States) Gabe Ruediger (WEC, UFC, PFC)
- (Brazil) Maurício Ruffy (UFC)
- (United States) Kade Ruotolo (ONE)
- (United States) Mike Russow (UFC, PRIDE, Adrenaline MMA)
- (United States) Ed Ruth (Bellator)
- (Poland) Daniel Rutkowski (KSW, FEN MMA, Babilon MMA, BAMMA)
- (Netherlands) Bas Rutten (Pancrase, UFC, WFA)
- (Uzbekistan) Nursulton Ruziboev (UFC)
- (Poland) Damian Rzepecki (FEN MMA)

== S ==
- (South Africa) Cameron Saaiman (UFC)
- (United States) Danny Sabatello (Bellator)
- (United States) Pat Sabatini (UFC)
- (Germany) Arian Sadiković (Oktagon)
- (United States) Amir Sadollah (UFC)
- (Azerbaijan) Nazim Sadykhov (CFFC, UFC)
- (United States) Frankie Saenz (KOTC, UFC)
- (Russia) Saparbek Safarov (UFC, M-1)
- (Belgium) Tarec Saffiedine (Shooto, DREAM, Strikeforce, UFC)
- (Canada) Jason Saggo (UFC)
- (France) Benoît Saint Denis (UFC)
- (Canada) Georges St-Pierre (UFC)
- (Haiti) Ovince St. Preux (XFC, Strikeforce, UFC)
- (Japan) Tomoyuki Saito (Shooto)
- (Japan) Yukio Sakaguchi (Pancrase, Shooto, DREAM, Sengoku)
- (Brazil) Augusto Sakai (KSW, UFC, Bellator)
- (Japan) Kazuhiro Sakamoto (Shooto)
- (Japan) Mitsuhiro Sakamoto (Shooto)
- (Italy) Alessio Sakara (CWFC, MFC, Jungle Fight, UFC, Bellator)
- (Japan) Wataru Sakata (PRIDE, RINGS)
- (Turkey) Gökhan Saki (UFC)
- (Japan) Kazushi Sakuraba (K-1 Hero's, PRIDE, UFC, DREAM)
- (Japan) Naoki Sakurada (Shooto, VTJ)
- (Japan) Hayato Sakurai (VTJ, DEEP, PRIDE, Shooto, UFC, DREAM)
- (Japan) Ryuta Sakurai (DEEP, Pancrase, KSW, PRIDE, Shooto)
- (United States) Justin Salas (UFC)
- (United States) Ivan Salaverry (K-1, Shooto, UFC, WFA, BAMMA)
- (Brazil) Marcello Salazar (IFL)
- (United States) Roman Salazar (UFC, Bellator, LFA)
- (Russia) Muslim Salikhov (UFC)
- (United States) Sean Salmon (UFC, Strikeforce, KOTC)
- (United States) John Salter (UFC, XFC, Adrenaline MMA, KOTC)
- (France) Dylan Salvador (PFL, EFC, Titan FC)
- (Azerbaijan) Zabit Samedov
- (United States) Josh Samman (†) (UFC, XFC)
- (United States) Josh Sampo (UFC)
- (United States) Jason Sampson (Bellator)
- (United States) Andrew Sanchez (UFC, RFA)
- (United States) Angelo Sanchez (KOTC, Bellator)
- (United States) Diego Sanchez (KOTC, UFC)
- (United States) Donald Sanchez (ACB, Bellator, KOTC)
- (United States) Eddie Sanchez (KOTC, UFC, Bellator, Titan FC)
- (United States) Emmanuel Sanchez (Bellator)
- (United States) Roberto Sanchez (UFC, LFA, LFC)
- (United States) Jerrod Sanders (UFC, Bellator, KOTC, WSOF)
- (United States) Luke Sanders (UFC, Strikeforce)
- (United States) Cory Sandhagen (UFC)
- (Mexico) Hector Sandoval (UFC, TPF)
- (Brazil) Marlon Sandro (Bellator, Sengoku, Pancrase, Shooto)
- (United States) Chris Sanford (UFC, WEC)
- (Japan) Naoki Sano (Pancrase, PRIDE)
- (Brazil) Giva Santana (Bellator, ShoXC, TPF)
- (Brazil) Jorge Santiago (UFC, Strikeforce, Sengoku, KOTC, Titan FC, WSOF)
- (United States) Mike Santiago (UFC)
- (Brazil) Bruno Santos (Bellator, UFC)
- (Brazil) Daniel Santos (UFC)
- (Brazil) Evangelista Santos (Strikeforce, Sengoku, PRIDE, Cage Rage, Jungle Fight, Pancrase)
- (Brazil) Iliarde Santos (UFC, Jungle Fight)
- (Brazil) Leonardo Santos (Shooto, Sengoku, CWFC, BAMMA, UFC)
- (Brazil) Luis Santos (WEC, Bellator, XFC)
- (Brazil) Thiago Santos (UFC)
- (Brazil) Thiago Santos (Bellator)
- (United States) Bob Sapp (K-1, K-1 Hero's, PRIDE, DREAM, SFL, OneFC, KSW)
- (Singapore) Eko Roni Saputra (ONE)
- (Brazil) Daniel Sarafian (Bellator, UFC)
- (Indonesia) Jeka Saragih (UFC)
- (Poland) Tomasz Sarara (KSW)
- (Russia) Alexander Sarnavskiy (Bellator, M-1)
- (Japan) Yosuke Saruta (ONE, Shooto)
- (Japan) Ulka Sasaki (UFC, DEEP, Shooto, Rizin)
- (Japan) Yuki Sasaki (PRIDE, Sengoku, Pancrase, UFC, Shooto, DEEP)
- (Japan) Yuta Sasaki (Shooto, VTJ, DEEP, UFC)
- (Thailand) Malaipet Sasiprapa (KOTC, ShoXC)
- (England) Paul Sass (Bellator, UFC)
- (Japan) Masaaki Satake (PRIDE)
- (Japan) Hikaru Sato (Pancrase, DEEP)
- (Japan) Rumina Sato (Shooto, VTJ)
- (Japan) Takashi Sato (UFC)
- (Japan) Takenori Sato (Sengoku, DEEP, Pancrase, K-1 Hero's, UFC)
- (United States) Ben Saunders (UFC, Titan FC, Bellator)
- (United States) Chris Saunders (UFC, Bellator)
- (United States) Townsend Saunders (UFC)
- (Japan) Kenichi Sawada (Shooto, Pancrase)
- (South Africa) Irshaad Sayed (OneFC)
- (United States) Eric Schafer (UFC)
- (United States) Kerry Schall (RINGS, UFC, Adrenaline MMA, ShoXC)
- (United States) Eric Schambari (WEC, Bellator)
- (United States) Brendan Schaub (UFC)
- (Brazil) Nino Schembri (PRIDE, Cage Rage)
- (Brazil) Fabiano Scherner (Jungle Fight, UFC, Cage Rage, IFL)
- (United States) Joe Schilling (ShoXC, Bellator)
- (Netherlands) Semmy Schilt (Pancrase, RINGS, UFC, PRIDE, K-1 Hero's)
- (United States) Adam Schindler (Bellator, Strikeforce)
- (United States) Matt Schnell (LFC, UFC)
- (Netherlands) Bob Schrijber (RINGS, PRIDE, M-1)
- (Brazil) Natan Schulte (PFL)
- (United States) Mark Schultz (UFC, Jungle Fight)
- (United States) Ryan Schultz (WEC, IFL, Sengoku)
- (United States) Justin Scoggins (UFC)
- (England) Brad Scott (UFC)
- (United States) Mike Seal (KOTC, Strikeforce, Bellator)
- (Republic of Ireland) Neil Seery (UFC, Cage Rage, CWFC, BAMMA)
- (New Zealand) Ray Sefo (K-1 Hero's, Strikeforce, WSOF)
- (New Zealand) Rony Sefo (PRIDE)
- (Japan) Yasuto Sekishima (Shooto)
- (United States) Pete Sell (UFC)
- (Netherlands) Gzim Selmani (BAMMA, Bellator)
- (United States) Matthew Semelsberger (UFC)
- (Russia) Andrei Semenov (M-1, PRIDE, UFC)
- (United States) Mackens Semerzier (UFC, WEC)
- (Russia) Alex Serdyukov (WEC)
- (United States) Matt Serra (UFC)
- (Colombia) Fredy Serrano (UFC)
- (Samoa) Carl Seumanutafa (PFL, Bellator, EliteXC, ShoXC, Strikeforce)
- (Brazil) Igor Severino (UFC, Oktagon)
- (United States) Dan Severn (KOTC, VTJ, PRIDE, UFC, WEC, MFC)
- (Russia) Alexandr Shabliy (Bellator, ACB, Kunlun)
- (United States) Edmen Shahbazyan (UFC)
- (United States) Kamal Shalorus (UFC, WEC, OneFC)
- (Russia) Shahbulat Shamhalaev (Bellator, M-1)
- (United States) Frank Shamrock (K-1, Pancrase, VTJ, Strikeforce, UFC, WEC)
- (United States) Ken Shamrock (Pancrase, PRIDE, UFC, KOTC)
- (Kyrgyzstan) Razhabali Shaydullaev (ACA, Rizin)
- (United States) Eric Shelton (UFC, RFA)
- (United States) Sean Sherk (KOTC, PRIDE, UFC)
- (United States) Chase Sherman (UFC, Titan FC)
- (Japan) Katsuyori Shibata (K-1, DEEP, DREAM, K-1 Hero's, Jungle Fight)
- (United States) Jake Shields (EliteXC, Pancrase, Shooto, K-1 Hero's, Strikeforce, UFC, WSOF)
- (Japan) Suguru Shigeno (Shooto)
- (Japan) Kiyotaka Shimizu (Shooto, Pancrase, DEEP)
- (Japan) Shunichi Shimizu (UFC, Pancrase, DEEP)
- (Japan) Yuya Shirai (DEEP, DREAM, BAMMA, Pancrase, OneFC, M-1)
- (United States) Wes Shivers (KOTC, Strikeforce, ShoXC)
- (Russia) Alexander Shlemenko (Bellator, SFL, ShoXC, Jungle Fight, M-1)
- (United States) Josh Shockley (UFC, Bellator)
- (Japan) Akira Shoji (Cage Rage, DEEP, KOTC, Pancrase, PRIDE)
- (Wales) Jack Shore (UFC)
- (Japan) Yuki Shoujou (Shooto)
- (Japan) Wakashoyo Shunichi (K-1 Hero's, DEEP)
- (United States) Sam Sicilia (UFC, Bellator)
- (United States) Steven Siler (UFC, TPF)
- (American Samoa) Siala-Mou "Mighty Mo" Siliga (K-1 Hero's, Bellator)
- (Brazil) Alex Silva (ONE)
- (Brazil) Anderson Silva (Cage Rage, PRIDE, Shooto, UFC)
- (Brazil) Antônio Silva (K-1 Hero's, EliteXC, CWFC, Sengoku, Strikeforce, UFC)
- (Brazil) Assuério Silva (Pancrase, Jungle Fight, UFC, PRIDE)
- (Brazil) Bruno Silva (UFC)
- (Brazil) Cláudio Silva (BAMMA, SFL, UFC)
- (Brazil) Erick Silva (Jungle Fight, UFC)
- (Brazil) Felipe Silva (UFC, Brave)
- (Brazil) Jay Silva (†) (UFC, KSW, Bellator, MFC, TPF)
- (Brazil) Jean Silva (UFC)
- (Brazil) Joaquim Silva (UFC)
- (Brazil) Paulo "Giant" Silva (K-1 Hero's, PRIDE)
- (Brazil) Rafael Silva (Bellator)
- (Brazil) Thiago Silva (Pancrase, Shooto, UFC, WSOF)
- (Brazil) Wanderlei Silva (PRIDE, UFC)
- (Brazil) Douglas Silva de Andrade (UFC)
- (Brazil) Elias Silvério (UFC, Jungle Fight)
- (United States) Ricky Simón (UFC)
- (United States) Aaron Simpson (UFC, WEC, WSOF)
- (United States) Heath Sims (Pancrase)
- (United States) Tony Sims (UFC)
- (United States) Wes Sims (K-1, IFL, Strikeforce, WEC, UFC)
- (United States) Lodune Sincaid (WEC, UFC, WFA, PFC)
- (United States) Rory Singer (PRIDE, KOTC, UFC, MFC)
- (India) Jaideep Singh (Rizin)
- (Australia) Elvis Sinosic (Cage Rage, Pancrase, UFC, K-1, RINGS)
- (Germany) Dennis Siver (UFC, CWFC)
- (United States) Chas Skelly (UFC, Bellator)
- (England) Matt Skelton (PRIDE)
- (Poland) Daniel Skibiński (KSW, CWFC, UAE Warriors, Babilon MMA)
- (Czech Republic) Daniel Škvor (Oktagon)
- (United States) Shanon Slack (Bellator)
- (United States) Ray Sloan (Bellator)
- (Poland) Paul Slowinski (KSW)
- (Lithuania) Kestutis Smirnovas (RINGS, PRIDE, Shooto, K-1, K-1 Hero's)
- (United States) Anthony Smith (Strikeforce, UFC, Bellator)
- (United States) Cole Smith (UFC)
- (United States) Colton Smith (M-1, UFC)
- (United States) David Smith (Strikeforce)
- (United States) Devonte Smith (UFC)
- (United States) Jordan Smith (Bellator)
- (United States) Maurice Smith (IFL, Pancrase, PRIDE, UFC, Sengoku, Strikeforce, RINGS)
- (United States) Patrick Smith (†) (K-1, UFC, Titan FC, YAMMA)
- (United States) Scott Smith (Strikeforce, EliteXC, PFC, UFC, WEC)
- (United States) Trevor Smith (Strikeforce, UFC)
- (United States) Louis Smolka (UFC, KOTC)
- (Brazil) André Soares (Shooto, CWFC, EliteXC)
- (Germany) Peter Sobotta (UFC, KSW)
- (Brazil) Renato Sobral (RINGS, UFC, Jungle Fight, Cage Rage, Affliction, Strikeforce, OneFC, Bellator)
- (Cameroon) Rameau Thierry Sokoudjou (PRIDE, WEC, UFC, DREAM, Affliction, Strikeforce, MFC, KSW, Bellator)
- (France) Axel Sola (Brave CF, UFC)
- (Croatia) Roberto Soldić (Final Fight, Cage Warriors, KSW)
- (United States) Joe Solecki (UFC)
- (Thailand) Rambaa Somdet (Shooto, DEEP, PFC)
- (United States) Joe Son (PRIDE, UFC)
- (United States) Chael Sonnen (Pancrase, WEC, UFC)
- (Argentina) Emiliano Sordi (Bellator, PFL, Jungle Fight, UAE Warriors)
- (United States) Punahele Soriano (UFC)
- (United States) Sean Soriano (UFC)
- (Thailand) Chandet Sorpantrey (K-1)
- (Poland) Krzysztof Soszynski (IFL, Strikeforce, UFC)
- (Australia) George Sotiropoulos (K-1, Shooto, UFC, Titan FC)
- (United States) Greg Soto (UFC)
- (United States) Joe Soto (Bellator, PFC, TPF, UFC)
- (United States) Andre Soukhamthath (UFC)
- (United States) Bobby Southworth (Strikeforce, UFC, PRIDE)
- (Netherlands) Andy Souwer (Rizin)
- (Brazil) Cristiano Souza (Bellator)
- (Brazil) Kevin Souza (UFC, Jungle Fight)
- (Brazil) Ronaldo Souza (UFC, Strikeforce, DREAM, Jungle Fight)
- (Poland) Artur Sowiński (KSW)
- (Sweden) Andreas Spång (Bellator, MFC, Strikeforce)
- (United States) Ron Sparks (Bellator)
- (United States) Tom Speer (WEC, UFC)
- (United States) Sean Spencer (UFC, Bellator)
- (Brazil) Mario Sperry (Cage Rage, PRIDE)
- (United States) Eric Spicely (UFC)
- (Netherlands) Ben Spijkers (Shooto)
- (United States) Waachiim Spiritwolf (Bellator, Strikeforce, KOTC, TPF)
- (United States) Daniel Spitz (UFC, KOTC)
- (Moldova) Serghei Spivac (UFC)
- (United States) Daniel Spohn (UFC, Bellator, PFL)
- (Suriname) Tyrone Spong (WSOF)
- (United States) Jeremy Spoon (Bellator, KOTC)
- (United States) Pete Spratt (MFC, Strikeforce, UFC)
- (United States) Ron Stallings (Strikeforce, UFC)
- (United States) Cody Stamann (UFC)
- (United States) Brian Stann (WEC, UFC)
- (United States) Josh Stansbury (UFC, Bellator)
- (United States) Clifford Starks (UFC, Bellator, WSOF)
- (Canada) Kalib Starnes (UFC, WSOF, Titan FC)
- (Argentina) Laureano Staropoli (PFL, UFC)
- (Poland) Damian Stasiak (UFC, KSW, BAMMA, ACB)
- (United States) Dominique Steele (UFC, Bellator, Strikeforce)
- (United States) Steve Steinbeiss (WEC, UFC, Bellator)
- (Armenia) Akop Stepanyan (Bellator, M-1)
- (United States) Jeremy Stephens (UFC)
- (United States) Aljamain Sterling (UFC)
- (Russia) Alexander Stetsurenko
- (United States) Joe Stevenson (KOTC, UFC)
- (United States) Gable Steveson (LFA)
- (Canada) Trevor Stewardson (KOTC)
- (England) Darren Stewart (UFC, CWFC)
- (United States) Luke Stewart (Strikeforce)
- (United States) Alex Stiebling (WEC, Pancrase, PRIDE, UFC, WFA)
- (United States) Tyler Stinson (Strikeforce, Bellator, WSOF, Titan FC)
- (New Zealand) Navajo Stirling (UFC)
- (United States) Dustin Stoltzfus (UFC)
- (Germany) Niklas Stolze (UFC, BAMMA)
- (United States) Ken Stone (UFC, WEC)
- (United States) Logan Storley (PFL)
- (United States) Rick Story (UFC)
- (Serbia) Darko Stošić (UFC, KSW)
- (United States) Raufeon Stots (Bellator)
- (Canada) Sam Stout (UFC)
- (United States) Dave Strasser (UFC, M-1, Cage Rage, Shooto)
- (United States) Gerald Strebendt (PRIDE, KOTC, UFC, Cage Rage, CWFC)
- (United States) Sean Strickland (KOTC, UFC)
- (Netherlands) Hans Stringer (UFC, WSOF, Shooto)
- (Netherlands) Stefan Struve (UFC, M-1)
- (Czech Republic) Josef Štummer (KSW)
- (Japan) Masanori Suda (DEEP, Pride, Shooto)
- (Japan) Tsuyoshi Sudario (Rizin)
- (Japan) Genki Sudo (K-1, K-1 Hero's, RINGS, Pancrase, UFC)
- (Japan) Takashi Sugiura (Pancrase, PRIDE)
- (Japan) Ren "YA-MAN" Sugiyama (Rizin)
- (United States) George Sullivan (UFC)
- (Russia) Amar Suloev (†) (M-1, Pancrase, PRIDE FC, UFC)
- (Japan) Mitsuhisa Sunabe (Pancrase, DEEP)
- (Samoa) Jason Suttie (PRIDE)
- (Japan) Shinichi "Wakakirin Shinichi" Suzukawa
- (Japan) Chihiro Suzuki (Rizin)
- (Japan) Hiroaki Suzuki (Rizin)
- (Japan) Masato Suzuki (Shooto)
- (Japan) Minoru Suzuki (DEEP, Pancrase)
- (Japan) Nobutatsu Suzuki (VTJ, OneFC)
- (United States) Cub Swanson (UFC, WEC, KOTC)
- (United States) Mike Swick (UFC, WEC)
- (Sweden) Sadibou Sy (PFL)
- (United States) Tim Sylvia (UFC, Affliction, Adrenaline MMA, OneFC, Titan FC)
- (Poland) Kamil Szkaradek (KSW)
- (Poland) Artur Szpilka (KSW)

== T ==
- (Australia) Junior Tafa (UFC)
- (Australia) Justin Tafa (UFC)
- (United States) Khalid Taha (Rizin, UFC)
- (Japan) Noboru Tahara (Shooto, Pancrase)
- (Guam) Joe Taimanglo (Bellator)
- (Japan) Tatsuro Taira (UFC)
- (Austria) Mairbek Taisumov (M-1, UFC)
- (Japan) Nobuhiko Takada (PRIDE)
- (Japan) Satoshi Takagenji (Rizin)
- (Japan) Kazuo Takahashi (Pancrase, Sengoku, PRIDE, UFC, K-1 Hero's)
- (Japan) Makoto Takahashi (Rizin, Bellator, DEEP, Pancrase)
- (Japan) Daiju Takase (DEEP, Pancrase, Adrenaline MMA, PRIDE, UFC)
- (Japan) Hiroyuki Takaya (Shooto, K-1 Hero's, WEC, DREAM, Strikeforce, VTJ)
- (Japan) Yoshihiro Takayama (PRIDE)
- (Japan) Yoshiyuki Takayama (Shooto)
- (Japan) Izuru Takeuchi (Sengoku, Shooto, Pancrase, K-1 Hero's)
- (Japan) Makoto Takimoto (Sengoku, PRIDE)
- (Russia) Oleg Taktarov (Pancrase, PRIDE, UFC, YAMMA)
- (United States) Payton Talbott (UFC)
- (Canada) Nordine Taleb (Bellator, UFC)
- (Japan) Akitoshi Tamura (Shooto, WEC, Sengoku, Pancrase)
- (Japan) Issei Tamura (UFC, Shooto)
- (Japan) Kiyoshi Tamura (DREAM, DEEP, K-1, K-1 Hero's, PRIDE, RINGS)
- (Japan) Yukinari Tamura (DEEP, Shooto, Rizin, ONE)
- (England) Jason Tan (UFC)
- (Japan) Kenichi Tanaka (Shooto)
- (Japan) Koichi Tanaka (Shooto, Pancrase, DEEP)
- (Japan) Kōji Tanaka (Rizin)
- (Japan) Michinori Tanaka (Shooto, UFC)
- (Japan) Tomohiro Tanaka (Shooto)
- (Japan) Isao Tanimura (Shooto)
- (United States) Evan Tanner (†) (Pancrase, UFC)
- (United States) Manny Tapia (KOTC, WEC, TPF)
- (United Kingdom) Andrew Tate (UCMMA)
- (Japan) Yuzo Tateishi (Shooto)
- (Japan) Uchu Tatsumi (Shooto)
- (Lithuania) Deividas Taurosevicius (IFL, WEC, Bellator)
- (United States) Brad Tavares (UFC)
- (Brazil) Thiago Tavares (UFC, CWFC)
- (United States) Jesse Taylor (WSOF, Strikeforce, MFC, CWFC, DREAM, KSW, UFC)
- (United States) Louis Taylor (Adrenaline MMA, Strikeforce, Bellator, UFC)
- (England) Paul Taylor (UFC, Cage Rage)
- (New Zealand) James Te Huna (UFC, KOTC)
- (Brazil) Glover Teixeira (WEC, PFC, Impact Fighting Championship, Shooto, UFC)
- (Brazil) John Teixeira (UFC, Shooto, Bellator)
- (Brazil) Tallison Teixeira (LFA, UFC)
- (United States) Tra Telligman (Pancrase, PRIDE, UFC)
- (Uzbekistan) Ramazan Temirov (Rizin, UFC)
- (United States) Sylvester Terkay (K-1, K-1 Hero's)
- (Guam) Herman Terrado (Bellator, Strikeforce)
- (United States) David Terrell (UFC, Pancrase)
- (United States) James Terry (Strikeforce, Bellator)
- (Serbia) Dragan Tešanović (Bellator)
- (Sweden) Daniel Teymur (UFC)
- (United States) Brandon Thatch (UFC, Strikeforce)
- (Canada) Elias Theodorou (†) (UFC, Bellator)
- (Brazil) Paulo Thiago (UFC, Jungle Fight)
- (Australia) Colby Thicknesse (UFC)
- (United States) Din Thomas (DEEP, Shooto, UFC)
- (United States) Ryan Thomas (Bellator, UFC, XFC)
- (United States) Treston Thomison (Bellator, KOTC)
- (England) James Thompson (Cage Rage, PRIDE, SFL, KSW, Sengoku, EliteXC, DREAM, Bellator)
- (United States) Nick Thompson (UFC, EliteXC, Strikeforce, Bellator, Sengoku, MFC)
- (England) Oli Thompson (UFC, KSW, Babilon MMA, BAMMA)
- (United States) Stephen Thompson (UFC)
- (United States) Josh Thomson (PRIDE, Strikeforce, UFC, WFA)
- (Netherlands) Sander Thonhauser (RINGS, M-1)
- (Norway) Simeon Thoresen (UFC, BAMMA, AOW, DEEP, CWFC)
- (Brazil) Gleison Tibau (UFC, DEEP)
- (United States) Darren Till (UFC)
- (United States) Kelvin Tiller (PFL, Bellator, WSOF)
- (Brazil) Ricardo Tirloni (Bellator, MFC)
- (Georgia (country)) Zaza Tkeshelashvili (RINGS)
- (Serbia) Duško Todorović (UFC)
- (Japan) Takashi Tojo (Shooto)
- (England) Tuco Tokkos (UFC, Bellator)
- (Japan) Hideo Tokoro (Shooto, Pancrase, K-1, K-1 Hero's, RINGS, DREAM, VTJ)
- (Russia) Anatoly Tokov (Bellator, Rizin, ACB)
- (Japan) Kazuki Tokudome (UFC, Pancrase, KSW, DEEP, Sengoku)
- (Canada) Shawn Tompkins
- (United States) Tyler Toner (UFC, WEC, Strikeforce)
- (United States) James Toney (UFC)
- (Bulgaria) Georgi Tonkov (RINGS)
- (United States) Garry Tonon (ONE)
- (Georgia (country)) Aleksandre Topuria (UFC)
- (Georgia (country)) Ilia Topuria (UFC)
- (Mexico) Guillermo Torres (LUX)
- (United States) Jose Torres (Brave CF, Titan FC, UFC)
- (Mexico) Manuel Torres (UFC)
- (United States) Miguel Torres (WEC, UFC, WSOF)
- (United States) Justin Torrey (Bellator)
- (Poland) Salim Touahri (UFC)
- (United States) Dequan Townsend (UFC, WXC, XFC, NAAFS)
- (Brazil) Tiago Trator (UFC, Jungle Fight, ACB)
- (Brazil) Roberto Traven (UFC, RINGS, Adrenaline MMA)
- (United States) Alexander Trevino (Strikeforce)
- (Mexico) Francisco Treviño (UFC)
- (United States) Frank Trigg (VTJ, PRIDE, Shooto, UFC, WFA)
- (Brazil) Francisco Trinaldo (Jungle Fight, UFC)
- (United States) Michael Trizano (Bellator, UFC)
- (Sweden) Tor Troéng (UFC)
- (United States) Abel Trujillo (UFC)
- (Croatia) Ivica Trušček (Oktagon MMA, Brave CF, KSW, KLF, FFC, M-1, AMC, CWFC)
- (Russia) Michail Tsarev (Bellator)
- (Armenia) Arman Tsarukyan (UFC)
- (Japan) Yasushi Tsujimoto (Shooto)
- (United States) Chris Tuchscherer (YAMMA, UFC)
- (Guam) Jon Tuck (UFC)
- (Canada) Gavin Tucker (UFC)
- (China) Jumabieke Tuerxun (UFC)
- (United States) Blair Tugman (Bellator)
- (Australia) Tai Tuivasa (UFC)
- (Russia) Zubaira Tukhugov (CWFC, UFC)
- (United States) Teila Tuli (†) (UFC)
- (Germany) Muslim Tulshaev (KSW)
- (Russia) Albert Tumenov (UFC, ACB)
- (England) Gary Turner (Cage Rage)
- (Brazil) Wellington Turman (UFC)
- (Georgia (country)) Raul Tutarauli (Glory of Heroes, M-1, ACA, KSW, Brave CF)
- (Poland) Marcin Tybura (UFC, M-1)

== U ==
- (Japan) Masakatsu Ueda (Shooto, OneFC, Bellator)
- (Japan) Kyuhei Ueno (Shooto)
- (Japan) Ryuki Ueyama (DEEP, K-1 Hero's, Pancrase, PRIDE, RINGS, AOW)
- (Brazil) Christian Uflacker (Bellator, Strikeforce)
- (Poland) Izu Ugonoh (KSW)
- (United States) Andy Uhrich (Bellator, Strikeforce)
- (Russia) Tagir Ulanbekov (UFC)
- (New Zealand) Carlos Ulberg (UFC)
- (Russia) Gasan Umalatov (M-1, UFC)
- (Russia) Magomed Umalatov (PFL)
- (United States) Zach Underwood (Bellator, Strikeforce, WSOF)
- (Japan) Caol Uno (K-1, K-1 Hero's, Shooto, VTJ, DREAM, UFC)
- (Mexico) Héctor Urbina (KOTC, Bellator, UFC)
- (Japan) Kozo Urita (DEEP, Pancrase)
- (Japan) Yasuhiro Urushitani (UFC, Shooto, DEEP, OneFC)
- (Nigeria) Kamaru Usman (UFC)
- (Russia) Alexander Ustinov
- (United States) Darren Uyenoyama (UFC, Strikeforce, Shooto, DREAM)

== V ==
- (Australia) Richie Vaculik (UFC, Pancrase)
- (New Zealand) John Vake
- (Russia) Artem Vakhitov (UFC)
- (Lithuania) Egidijus Valavicius (RINGS, PRIDE, Shooto, K-1, K-1 Hero's, Bellator)
- (United States) Bart Vale (RINGS)
- (United States) Charlie Valencia (UFC, WEC)
- (Russia) Timur Valiev (UFC, PFL, ACB, WSOF)
- (Argentina) Kevin Vallejos (UFC)
- (United States) Isaac Vallie-Flagg (UFC, Strikeforce, KOTC)
- (Myanmar) Joshua Van (UFC)
- (United States) Mike Van Arsdale (UFC, WFA)
- (United States) Brylan Van Artsdalen (Bellator)
- (United States) Matt Van Buren (UFC, Bellator)
- (United States) Ron van Clief (UFC)
- (Suriname) Lloyd van Dams (PRIDE)
- (Netherlands) Piet van Gammeren (M-1)
- (Netherlands) Costello van Steenis (Bellator, PFL)
- (Netherlands) Herman van Tol (M-1)
- (United States) Jared Vanderaa (LFA, BAMMA, KOTC, UFC)
- (United States) Austin Vanderford (Bellator, LFA)
- (Guyana) Carey Vanier (Bellator)
- (United States) Lando Vannata (UFC, Pancrase)
- (United States) Paul Varelans (Pancrase, RINGS, UFC)
- (Mexico) Kazula Vargas (UFC, LUX)
- (United States) Jamie Varner (UFC, WEC, XFC, KOTC, Titan FC)
- (Russia) Vyacheslav Vasilevsky (Bellator, M-1)
- (England) Linton Vassell (Bellator, CWFC)
- (Cuba) Javier Vazquez (UFC, WEC, ShoXC, EliteXC, Shooto, KOTC)
- (United States) Matt Veach (BAMMA, MFC, CWFC, UFC)
- (United States) Joe Vedepo (UFC, Adrenaline MMA, Bellator)
- (Slovakia) Attila Vegh (Bellator, KSW, Shooto)
- (United States) Cain Velasquez (UFC, Strikeforce)
- (Serbia) Bojan Veličković (RFA, UFC)
- (Czech Republic) Karlos Vemola (UFC)
- (Brazil) Luigi Vendramini (UFC)
- (Netherlands) Jerrel Venetiaan (RINGS, PRIDE)
- (Philippines) Brandon Vera (ONE, UFC, WEC)
- (Ecuador) Marlon Vera (UFC)
- (United States) C.J. Vergara (UFC)
- (Netherlands) Rico Verhoeven
- (Brazil) Renato Verissimo (UFC, EliteXC)
- (Italy) Marvin Vettori (UFC)
- (Brazil) Guilherme Viana (Bellator, Shooto)
- (Brazil) Hugo Viana (UFC)
- (Brazil) Vitor Vianna (Bellator)
- (United States) James Vick (UFC)
- (Brazil) David Vieira
- (Brazil) Milton Vieira (UFC, Strikeforce, DEEP, PRIDE, M-1, Shooto)
- (Brazil) Rodolfo Vieira (UFC)
- (Cuba) Alexis Vila (PFC, Bellator, WSOF)
- (United States) Gian Villante (Strikeforce, UFC)
- (United States) Ike Villanueva (UFC, Bellator)
- (United States) Joey Villaseñor (Strikeforce, PRIDE, KOTC, EliteXC, BAMMA, DEEP, WFA)
- (Brazil) Danillo Villefort (WSOF, Strikeforce, UFC, WEC, IFL, Jungle Fight)
- (Brazil) Yuri Villefort (UFC, Strikeforce)
- (New Zealand) Doug Viney
- (Brazil) Marcos Vinicius (UFC)
- (United States) Brandon Visher (WEC)
- (United States) Falaniko Vitale (UFC, Strikeforce, Bellator, KOTC, IFL, RINGS)
- (United States) Bobby Voelker (M-1, Titan FC, Strikeforce, UFC)
- (Slovakia) Štefan Vojčák (KSW, Oktagon MMA)
- (Australia) Alexander Volkanovski (UFC, AFC)
- (United States) Jacob Volkmann (Bellator, UFC, WSOF)
- (Russia) Alexander Volkov (Bellator, M-1, UFC)
- (United States) Jason Von Flue (Strikeforce, WEC, KOTC, UFC)
- (Ukraine) Igor Vovchanchyn (PRIDE)
- (Netherlands) Dick Vrij (RINGS)

== W ==
- (Japan) Takuya Wada (Pancrase, Shooto)
- (United States) Chris Wade (UFC)
- (United States) TJ Waldburger (UFC)
- (United States) Donny Walker (KOTC, UFC, Bellator)
- (United States) Herschel Walker (Strikeforce)
- (Brazil) Johnny Walker (UFC)
- (Brazil) Valter Walker (UFC, Titan FC)
- (United States) Rodney Wallace (UFC, M-1, MFC, KSW, Bellator)
- (England) Jim Wallhead (Bellator, BAMMA, CWFC, UFC)
- (United States) Cory Walmsley (UFC)
- (Australia) Richard Walsh (UFC)
- (Brazil) Erik Wanderley
- (England) Curt Warburton (UFC, BAMMA, CWFC, KSW)
- (United States) Brennan Ward (Bellator)
- (Republic of Ireland) Charlie Ward (UFC, Bellator)
- (United States) Terrion Ware (UFC, ACB, BAMMA)
- (Japan) Yasushi Warita (Shooto)
- (United States) Joe Warren (DREAM, Bellator)
- (United States) James Warring
- (Japan) Kazuhisa Watanabe (K-1)
- (Japan) Yuichi Watanabe (Shooto)
- (United States) Ron Waterman (Pancrase, PRIDE, UFC, WEC, WFA, EliteXC)
- (England) Tom Watson (UFC, BAMMA, MFC)
- (United States) Walel Watson (UFC, Titan FC)
- (United States) Brok Weaver (UFC, Titan FC)
- (Singapore) Royston Wee (UFC)
- (United States) Brent Weedman (Bellator)
- (Germany) Daniel Weichel (Bellator, BAMMA, M-1, CWFC)
- (United States) Chris Weidman (UFC)
- (England) Mark Weir (UFC, WEC, Cage Rage, PRIDE, Pancrase)
- (Hungary) Christian Wellisch (KOTC, Shooto, WEC, UFC)
- (United States) Jeremiah Wells (UFC)
- (Brazil) Fabrício Werdum (UFC, Strikeforce, PRIDE, Jungle Fight)
- (Brazil) Cassio Werneck (WEC)
- (United States) Mike Wessel (Bellator, UFC)
- (United States) Ed West (WSOF, Bellator, IFL)
- (United States) Michael Westbrook (KOTC)
- (Canada) Sheldon Westcott (MFC, UFC)
- (United States) Coty Wheeler (WEC, KOTC)
- (United States) Alex White (UFC, Titan FC)
- (United States) Vernon White (Strikeforce, PRIDE, UFC, Pancrase, IFL, KOTC, WFA)
- (Scotland) Rob Whiteford (UFC, PFL, Bellator, ACB)
- (United States) Mike Whitehead (UFC, Strikeforce, Affliction, M-1, IFL, WEC)
- (United States) Garett Whiteley (UFC)
- (Australia) Robert Whittaker (UFC)
- (Poland) Adam Wieczorek (UFC)
- (Suriname) Orlando Wiet (UFC)
- (United States) Justin Wilcox (Strikeforce, Bellator)
- (England) Mike Wilkinson (UFC)
- (Australia) Rob Wilkinson (PFL, UFC)
- (England) James Wilks (UFC, KOTC)
- (Thailand) Danial Williams (ONE)
- (United States) Jeremy Williams
- (United States) Joe Williams (Bellator, KOTC)
- (United States) Jordan Williams (UFC, Bellator)
- (United States) Khaos Williams (UFC)
- (United States) Patrick Williams (UFC, XFC)
- (United States) Pete Williams (RINGS, UFC, Pancrase, KOTC)
- (United States) Rubin Williams (DREAM)
- (United States) Steve Williams (K-1)
- (United States) Tedd Williams (UFC, KOTC)
- (United States) Justin Willis (UFC, WSOF)
- (United States) Chris Wilson (KOTC, IFL, UFC, Shooto)
- (United States) Jonathan Wilson (UFC)
- (United States) Matt Wiman (UFC)
- (United States) Eddie Wineland (UFC, WEC, Shooto)
- (United States) Deron Winn (UFC, Bellator)
- (England) Andre Winner (UFC, BAMMA, CWFC, Cage Rage, KSW)
- (United States) Anthony Wint (UFC)
- (Thailand) Shannon Wiratchai (OneFC)
- (United States) Eric Wisely (UFC, Strikeforce, Bellator)
- (United States) Keith Wisniewski (UFC, Shooto, IFL, M-1)
- (United States) Jason Witt (Bellator, Titan, LFA, UFC)
- (United States) Travis Wiuff (Jungle Fight, Bellator, UFC, IFL, PRIDE, Sengoku, KOTC, YAMMA)
- (Thailand) Mongkhon Wiwasuk (ShoXC, KOTC)
- (Poland) Marcin Wójcik (KSW, FEN MMA, PFL, CWFC)
- (United States) Brandon Wolff (K-1, UFC, WEC, EliteXC)
- (England) Nathaniel Wood (UFC)
- (United States) Lloyd Woodard (Bellator, Titan FC, KOTC)
- (United States) Tyron Woodley (Strikeforce, UFC)
- (United States) Sean Woodson (UFC)
- (United States) Khama Worthy (UFC, KOTC)
- (United States) Justin Wren (UFC, Bellator)
- (United States) Cliff Wright (LFA, KOTC, Bellator)
- (United States) Jordan Wright (UFC)
- (Poland) Andrzej Wronski
- (Poland) Arkadiusz Wrzosek (KSW)
- (China) Wuliji Buren (UFC)

== Y ==
- (China) Song Yadong (UFC)
- (Turkey) Abdul-Rakhman Yakhyaev (UFC)
- (Turkmenistan) Dovletdzhan Yagshimuradov (PFL, ACB, Bellator)
- (Brazil) Rani Yahya (Jungle Fight, K-1 Hero's, PFC, WEC, UFC)
- (Ukraine) Vitaliy Yakimenko (FEN MMA, KSW)
- (Russia) Alexander Yakovlev (M-1, Shooto, UFC)
- (Japan) Manabu Yamada (Pancrase, Shooto)
- (Japan) Mikihito Yamagami (Shooto, VTJ)
- (Japan) Mamoru Yamaguchi (Shooto, KOTC, VTJ, TPF)
- (Japan) Keito Yamakita (ONE, Pancrase)
- (Japan) Keiichiro Yamamiya (Pancrase, Sengoku, DEEP, UFC)
- (Japan) Kenichi Yamamoto (RINGS, PRIDE, UFC)
- (Japan) Norifumi Yamamoto (†) (Shooto, K-1, K-1 Hero's, DREAM, UFC)
- (Japan) Yoshihisa Yamamoto (K-1 Hero's, RINGS, PRIDE, DEEP, VTJ)
- (Brazil) Goiti Yamauchi (Bellator)
- (Russia) Petr Yan (UFC)
- (Japan) Ryushi Yanagisawa (Pancrase, RINGS, DEEP)
- (United States) Adrian Yañez (UFC)
- (South Korea) Dongi Yang (UFC, DEEP)
- (Japan) Masutatsu Yano (UFC, Pancrase, DEEP)
- (China) Zhikui Yao (UFC)
- (China) Hu Yaozong (UFC)
- (United States) Emmanuel Yarbrough (†) (UFC, Shooto, PRIDE)
- (Japan) Tadao Yasuda (PRIDE, K-1)
- (Japan) Yoshiaki Yatsu (PRIDE)
- (Malaysia) Melvin Yeoh (OneFC)
- (Japan) Hirotaka Yokoi (PRIDE, RINGS, DEEP, Shooto)
- (Japan) Kazunori Yokota (Pancrase, Sengoku, DEEP)
- (Japan) Tetsuo Yokoyama (Shooto)
- (Japan) Jinzaburo Yonezawa (Pancrase, Shooto)
- (South Korea) Dong Sik Yoon (PRIDE, K-1 Hero's, DREAM)
- (New Zealand) Jim York (Sengoku, KOTC)
- (Japan) Hidehiko Yoshida (PRIDE, Sengoku)
- (Japan) Yoshiyuki Yoshida (Shooto, UFC, Bellator, OneFC, DEEP)
- (England) Jason Young (UFC, Cage Rage, CWFC)
- (United States) Savant Young (IFL, Shooto, Affliction, Bellator, TPF)
- (Nigeria) Sodiq Yusuff (UFC)
- (Netherlands) Gilbert Yvel (RINGS, PRIDE, UFC, Affliction, M-1, K-1)

== Z ==
- (United States) Luke Zachrich (KOTC, Bellator, UFC)
- (Canada) Aiemann Zahabi (UFC)
- (Poland) Sergiusz Zając (KSW, Babilon MMA)
- (Morocco) Youssef Zalal (UFC)
- (Brazil) Elizeu Zaleski dos Santos (UFC)
- (Lithuania) Marius Žaromskis (Cage Rage, Strikeforce, Bellator, DREAM)
- (Russia) Shamil Zavurov (M-1, Bellator)
- (Germany) David Zawada (UFC, KSW, PFL)
- (Russia) Mikhail Zayats (M-1, Bellator)
- (Russia) Magomed Zaynukov (EFC)
- (Serbia) Miljan Zdravković (KSW, Brave CF)
- (Mexico) Daniel Zellhuber (LUX, UFC)
- (Russia) Roman Zentsov (M-1, PRIDE)
- (China) Lipeng Zhang (UFC, AOW)
- (China) Tiequan Zhang (UFC, WEC, AOW)
- (China) Rong Zhu (UFC)
- (Kazakhstan) Zhalgas Zhumagulov (UFC)
- (France) Farès Ziam (UFC)
- (Curaçao) Errol Zimmerman (K-1)
- (Romania) Catalin Zmarandescu (BAMMA, K-1)
- (Russia) Nikolai Zouev (RINGS)
- (United States) Virgil Zwicker (Bellator, Strikeforce, KSW)

== See also ==
- List of bare-knuckle lightweight champions
- List of female mixed martial artists
- List of male boxers
- List of male kickboxers
- List of undefeated mixed martial artists
- UFC rankings
