= 勇人 =

勇人, meaning “courage, person”, is a masculine name, may refer to:

- Hayato (given name), Japanese masculine given name
- Taketo, Japanese masculine given name
- Yūto, Japanese masculine given name
