= Hayato =

Hayato may refer to:

- Hayato (given name), a masculine Japanese given name
- Hayato, Kagoshima, a town located in Aira District, Kagoshima, Japan
- Hayato people (隼人, "falcon person"), peoples of ancient Japan
- Hayato (restaurant), a Michelin-starred restaurant in Los Angeles, California
- Hayato (satellite), a Japanese CubeSat
