= Takanori Gomi =

Japanese mixed martial artist

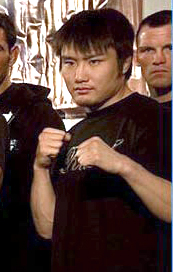
- Gomi in 2007
- Born: September 22, 1978 (age 48); Kanagawa, Japan
- Other names: The Fireball Kid
- Height: 5 ft 8 in (1.73 m)
- Weight: 155 lb (70 kg; 11 st 1 lb)
- Division: Featherweight; Lightweight; Welterweight
- Reach: 70 in (178 cm)
- Style: Shootfighting
- Stance: Southpaw
- Fighting out of: Tokyo, Japan
- Team: K'z Factory (1998–2000); Kiguchi Dojo (2000–2006); Kugayama Rascal; American Kickboxing Academy
- Teacher: Noriaki Kiguchi
- Rank: A-Class Shootist
- Years active: 1998–2018

Mixed martial arts record
- Total: 52
- Wins: 36
- By knockout: 14
- By submission: 6
- By decision: 16
- Losses: 15
- By knockout: 4
- By submission: 8
- By decision: 3
- No contests: 1

Other information
- Mixed martial arts record from Sherdog

Takanori Gomi (Japanese: 五味隆典, Gomi Takanori; born September 22, 1978) is a Japanese professional mixed martial artist who gained international fame in Pride Fighting Championships. Later in his career, Gomi also competed in the Ultimate Fighting Championship. Gomi is the only Pride FC Lightweight Champion in the organization's history. He became the Lightweight Grand Prix Winner at Pride Shockwave 2005, thus winning every lightweight accolade put forth by Pride FC. Gomi also held a record twelve-fight winning streak in Shooto, where he was a former Shooto Lightweight Champion, as well as a four-time All-Japan Combat Wrestling Champion.

Nicknamed "The Fireball Kid", Gomi had a ten-fight winning streak spanning 2004 to 2006 in Pride FC, the longest in the organization's history. During this streak, Gomi knocked out Ralph Gracie in six seconds, the quickest knockout victory in Pride FC history. Gomi later defeated Tatsuya Kawajiri (voted Pride FC's Fight of the Year), Luiz Azeredo, and Hayato Sakurai en route to becoming Pride FC's 2005 Lightweight Grand Prix Winner, after which he was awarded the Pride FC Lightweight Championship. At Pride Bushido 13, Gomi successfully defended the title against Marcus Aurélio.

During his record-setting championship reigns in Pride FC and Shooto, Gomi was widely regarded as one of the world’s leading lightweights fighters and is considered one of the best lightweights in mixed martial arts history.

== Biography ==
Gomi was born in Kanagawa, Japan in 1978 and started boxing at Sagamihara Yonekura Gym in 1994 while he was attending Kanagawa Prefectural Aikawa Higashi Junior High School. Gomi was athletic and the pitcher of the school's baseball team, but dropped out of high school in 1996 when he failed to pass on to the next grade. This caused an argument between Gomi and his father who disowned him as a result of the incident. Gomi then went on to learn freestyle wrestling and catch wrestling at Kiguchi Dojo and competed in many wrestling tournaments throughout Japan, the pinnacle of his grappling career being his four All-Japan Combat Wrestling championships, in which he defeated a number of the nation's top grapplers, future opponent Mitsuhiro Ishida amongst them.

== Mixed martial arts career ==
=== Shooto ===
Gomi joined the official Shooto gym in 1997 where he began training and taking part in the amateur Shooto competitions. He made his professional mixed martial arts debut on November 27, 1998, at Shooto Las Grandes Viajes 6 in Tokyo, where he defeated Hiroshi Tsuruya by decision. Gomi won his first 14 MMA matches, mostly in the Shooto organization, but also fought in Vale Tudo Japan and in the Hawaiian-based organization SuperBrawl.

Gomi became the Shooto World Lightweight Champion in 2001 after defeating former teammate Rumina Sato by unanimous decision on December 16. Gomi then defeated highly regarded American grappler Chris Brennan on September 16, 2002, via unanimous decision. He also defended the Shooto crown in 2002, beating Dokonjonosuke Mishima by TKO in the second round.

Gomi's first loss was also his last fight in Shooto for six years. It took place on August 10, 2003, at the Yokohama Cultural Gymnasium. Gomi lost his title to Norwegian fighter Joachim Hansen by majority decision. This loss was considered a huge upset at the time due to Hansen's 6–1–1 record in MMA.

=== Rumble on the Rock ===
Gomi then fought former UFC Welterweight Champion, and former UFC Lightweight Champion B.J. Penn on October 10, 2003, at the Rumble on the Rock 4 event in Honolulu, Hawaii. His first fight under unified rules, Gomi was defeated in the third round by rear-naked choke submission.

=== Pride Fighting Championships ===
After back-to-back losses, Gomi found a new home in Japan's biggest MMA organization, the Pride Fighting Championships. He made his debut within the organization on February 15, 2004, at Pride Bushido 2 where he fought Jadyson Costa of the famed Chute Boxe team out of Brazil. Gomi stopped Costa via TKO halfway through the first round.

Gomi was asked back to Pride to face off with the undefeated Ralph Gracie at Pride Bushido 3. Gracie was the first coach of B.J. Penn, one of Gomi's losses. Unlike his fight with Penn, Gomi made quick work of Gracie, scoring a six-second KO in the first round, the quickest match in the organization's history, due to repeated knee strikes.

Gomi remained within the Bushido series, fighting and defeating both Fábio Mello and Charles "Crazy Horse" Bennett in the first round at Pride Bushido 4 and Pride Bushido 5. Mello later noted that, "Apart from being a good wrestler and a fine striker, Gomi knows how to defend on the ground. He is a complete fighter who, due to his MMA experience, grows as the bout unfolds."

Gomi then appeared at Pride's New Year's Eve show, Pride Shockwave 2004, against former UFC Lightweight Champion Jens Pulver. Gomi scored a knockout with an uppercut at 6:21 in the first round.

Gomi started off 2005 with a win over Luiz Azeredo at Pride Bushido 7. Azeredo dominated the fight from the opening bell with knees, punches, and flying kicks, but at the 3:46 mark of the first round, Gomi caught Luiz with two hooks that sent the Chute Boxe fighter to the mat. Gomi was then criticized for continuing to attack, even after Azeredo became unconscious, and was restrained by Dream Stage Entertainment (DSE) crew and staff. The Chute Boxe team stormed the ring and got into an altercation with Kiguchi Dojo. Gomi later stated that the extracurricular attack was due to adrenaline and apologized for his actions.

Wanting to capitalize on the altercation at Pride Bushido 7 and Gomi's wins over Chute Boxe team members Jadson Costa and Luiz Azeredo, Pride set Gomi up with Chute Box Lightweight Jean Silva at Pride Bushido 8. Gomi won the fight by unanimous decision, securing an armbar in the waning seconds of the fight.

In August, Pride announced that in the month of September they would be hosting an eight-man Lightweight tournament. The first round set up Gomi with fellow Japanese fighter Tatsuya Kawajiri. This fight was billed "the battle of the twenty first century boys" in Japan due to the popularity and world-class match up of the two fighters. Many MMA critics had Gomi ranked number one and Kawajiri number two in the Lightweight division. Gomi submitted Kawajiri in the first round with a rear-naked choke. Gomi then had to fight again later that night in the semi-finals against Luiz Azeredo. Gomi won via unanimous decision, becoming a finalist in the 2005 Lightweight Grand Prix.

Gomi met the other finalist, Hayato Sakurai, at Pride Shockwave 2005. Sakurai and Gomi were teammates at the official Shooto gym back in the late 1990s. Sakurai defeated Jens Pulver and Joachim Hansen to reach the finals. After some exchanges on their feet, Sakurai tried to take Gomi down with a hip toss, but on the way down, Gomi ended up on top in the mount. "The Fireball Kid" began to rain down punches, and after taking many shots Sakurai twisted to escape, giving his back to Gomi. Finally Sakurai escaped and both fighters were on their feet, but the punches had taken their toll on Sakurai. Gomi threw a right hand and then followed up with a left-right combination. The last right hook caught Sakurai on the chin, knocking him out at 3:56 of the first round. Gomi was crowned the Pride 2005 Lightweight Grand Prix Champion. The KO win helped Gomi earn 2005 Fighter of the Year honors from Sherdog, an honor he shared with Mauricio "Shogun" Rua.

Gomi then made his 2006 debut at Pride Bushido 10. Before the event, DSE announced that Gomi would be crowned the Pride Lightweight Champion due to winning the Pride 2005 Lightweight Grand Prix, although the upcoming Bushido 10 fight would not be a title match. He then faced Marcus Aurelio of American Top Team later that night. Aurelio choked out Gomi within the first round with an arm triangle. This match-up was a huge upset and put doubt within Gomi's ability to fight off of his back. Although Aurelio won the match, it was a non-title bout, with Gomi remaining the Pride Lightweight Champion. Gomi said he took the match too easily and that this loss was the best thing for him to refocus and become a better fighter.

After a few months off while building his Rascal Gym, Gomi made his return to the Pride ring at Pride Bushido 12 against 10–1 French fighter David Baron. Baron seemed willing to trade with Gomi and managed to slip some punches. Eventually Gomi caught up with him and knocked the Frenchman down, mixing up punches to the head and body. Baron missed a takedown attempt, allowing Gomi to get around his back and slam Baron to the ground. Baron rolled in an attempt to shake off his Japanese opponent, but Gomi held on, sinking in a rear-naked choke. Baron defended the choke as long as he could, but eventually Gomi completed the technique, forcing Baron to tap at the 7:10 mark of the first round. Baron had previously won a tournament in Europe for the right to face Gomi.

Gomi rematched Aurelio at Pride Bushido 13 on November 5, 2006. This time the Pride Lightweight Championship was on the line. Both fighters were extremely cautious, and many times the referee could be heard calling for more action during the bout. Aurelio's jab was effective and hit the champion several times. Gomi, often switching his stance, replied with strikes of his own and landed numerous leg kicks. Several times the American Top Team fighter ended up on his back after failed takedown attempts. Rather than follow him down, Gomi just kicked Aurelio's legs until the referee would stand the action back up.

Aurelio scored a clean takedown at the end of the first round, though. Aurelio attempted another takedown in the second, only to see "The Fireball Kid" counter with a kimura. Gomi showed shades of his past catch wrestling accolades when he countered another Aurelio takedown attempt with a half-nelson. He did not follow Aurelio to the ground, instead attacking his legs with kicks. Gomi refused to follow Aurelio to the ground despite his opponent's taunting. Gomi knocked down Aurelio with a body shot late in the last round, and the bout ended with Gomi connecting with a hard kick to Aurelio's body just before the final bell. The fight went to the judges and Gomi retained his title, walking away with the split decision.

Gomi's earned a first round knockout against Mitsuhiro Ishida at Pride Shockwave 2006. Less than a minute into the fight Gomi countered a right leg kick from Ishida with a straight left punch that knocked him down. Gomi immediately went in for the finish, stopping Ishida with a series of hammer fists.

At Pride 33, Gomi suffered a loss to UFC veteran Nick Diaz by way of gogoplata submission. In the beginning of the first round, Gomi was landing blows on the taller Diaz, even scoring a knockdown, which he was unable to capitalize upon. However, Diaz came back quickly and began to bombard Gomi, who had become visibly exhausted, with straight jabs and right hands for the later half of the round. As the second round opened, Gomi gamely tried to regain lost ground, but after a double leg takedown into Diaz's guard, suddenly found himself in a gogoplata submission. The lightweight champion tapped out at 1:46 of the second round. However, the Nevada State Athletic Commission has declared the fight a "no contest" after Diaz tested positive for marijuana.

By the end of his Pride tenure, Gomi was 13–1 with 1 NC in Pride.

=== World Victory Road, back to Shooto and future ===
After Zuffa, the parent company of the UFC, purchased Pride Fighting Championships from Dream Stage Entertainment, Gomi signed on with World Victory Road, and fought in its inaugural event, "Sengoku", where he defeated Duane Ludwig by TKO (cut).

He then fought at World Victory Road's Sengoku 4 on August 24, 2008, against Sung Hwan Pang. Gomi won the contest via Unanimous Decision. Gomi competed on November 1, 2008, where he lost a split decision to Russian fighter Sergey Golyaev at Sengoku VI. It was the Upset of the Year for 2008 according to Sherdog.com. He then fought Satoru Kitaoka on January 4, 2009, for the Sengoku lightweight championship. Gomi was defeated at 1:41 by Achilles lock.

On May 10, 2009, he returned to Shooto at Shooto: Tradition Final where he faced the Shooto Champion at the time in a non title bout, Takashi Nakakura. Gomi won via KO in the second round.

His next fight was then set to for Affliction Entertainment at Affliction: Trilogy, with his opponent being Rafaello Oliveira, but the event was ultimately canceled.

In October 2009, Gomi fought and defeated Tony Hervey at Shooto's Vale Tudo Japan 2009. Gomi said that the fight would be his last fight in Japan before moving to the US.

=== Ultimate Fighting Championship ===
On January 1, 2010, it was announced that Gomi had signed with the UFC. Gomi faced Kenny Florian in his UFC debut at UFC Fight Night 21 and was submitted by Florian via rear-naked choke in the third round after being dominated by jabs and body shots for two rounds.

Gomi was expected to face Joe Stevenson on August 1, 2010, at UFC Live on Versus: 2. However, Stevenson suffered an injury while training and was replaced by Tyson Griffin. Gomi defeated Griffin via one punch KO at 1:04 of the first round. Gomi caught Griffin with a left cross following up with a right hook causing Griffin to fall face first into the canvas where Gomi then followed up onto Griffin's back with few short punches before the fight was stopped. He is the first person to have stopped Griffin via knockout as all of Griffin's previous losses have gone to a decision. Gomi also was awarded Knockout Of The Night bonus for his performance.

Gomi faced Clay Guida at UFC 125. After a very one-sided first round, he was defeated by Guida via guillotine choke in the second round.

Gomi faced Nate Diaz on September 24, 2011, at UFC 135 where he lost late in the first round by submission due to an armbar.

Gomi was expected to face George Sotiropoulos on February 26, 2012, at UFC 144 but the Australian fighter pulled out after sustaining an injury. Gomi instead faced Eiji Mitsuoka and won via TKO in the second round.

Gomi defeated Mac Danzig via split decision on November 10, 2012, at UFC on Fuel TV 6. Gomi, keeping true to his plead, came into the fight in considerably better shape and showcased a drastically improved game including taking Danzig down a few times.

Gomi faced Diego Sanchez on March 3, 2013, at UFC on Fuel TV 8. Gomi lost a controversial split decision to Sanchez. 12 of 12 media outlets scored the bout in favor of Gomi. Even UFC President, Dana White, had expressed on Twitter that he felt Sanchez did not do enough to win the decision.

Gomi faced Isaac Vallie-Flagg on April 26, 2014, at UFC 172. He won the fight via unanimous decision. The win also earned Gomi his second Fight of the Night bonus award.

Gomi next faced Myles Jury on September 20, 2014, at UFC Fight Night 52. He lost the fight via TKO in the first round, resulting in the first knockout loss of his career.

Gomi faced Joe Lauzon on July 25, 2015, at UFC on Fox 16. He lost the fight via TKO in the first round.

Gomi next faced Jim Miller on July 9, 2016, at UFC 200. He lost the fight via TKO in the first round.

Gomi then faced Jon Tuck on June 17, 2017, at UFC Fight Night: Holm vs. Correia. He lost by submission in the first round.

Gomi faced Dong Hyun Kim on September 23, 2017, at UFC Fight Night: Saint Preux vs. Okami. He lost the fight via TKO on round one.

Gomi was released from the UFC on October 23, 2017. He had a record of 4 wins and 9 losses with the UFC. He lost the last 5 fights of his UFC career, all by first-round stoppage.

=== Rizin Fighting Federation ===
Returning to a Japanese promotion for the first time in over seven years, Gomi faced Yuzuke Yachi on December 31, 2017, at 2017 in Rizin Fighting Federation#Rizin World Grand Prix 2017: Final Round. He lost the fight via submission in the first round.

At Rizin 11, Gomi faced UFC veteran Melvin Guillard. He won via KO in under 3 minutes in the 1st Round. This was his first victory in over 4 years.

== Boxing and kickboxing ==
Gomi had his first Kickboxing match in an exhibition fight against Masato at KYOKUGEN 2016 on December 31, 2016. The fight went the distance so no winner was decided under official Kickboxing exhibition rules.

Gomi fought Kouzi at Rizin 26. Gomi's weight limit was 75 kg and Koji's 65 kg. The rules of the bout forbid grappling and kicking, while both fighters wore 12oz gloves. Gomi won the bout via majority decision.

Gomi faced Tenshin Nasukawa in a two-round exhibition boxing match at Rizin 33 - Saitama on December 31, 2021. The bout ended in a no decision due to time expiring with no stoppage.

== Fighting style ==
Unusual for a Japanese mixed martial artist of his style and class, Gomi was a strong sprawl and brawl fighter. He combined a sterling takedown defense with powerful, aggressive boxing, which gained him the nickname of "Fireball Kid" for his punching power and spectacular knockouts. Gomi would harmoniously use both orthodox and southpaw stances, combining the left straight with a feared overhand right, also using the clinch to set up strikes. He also was skilled on the ground, preferring to use ground and pound over submission attempts.

== Championships and accomplishments ==
=== Mixed martial arts ===
- Pride Fighting Championships
  - Pride Lightweight Championship (One Time)
    - One successful title defense
  - Pride 2005 Lightweight Grand Prix Winner
  - Most successful title defenses in the Lightweight division
  - Most consecutive title defenses in the Lightweight division
  - Only Pride World Lightweight Champion in Pride FC History
  - Only Pride Grand Prix Winner in Pride FC Lightweight Division History
  - One of only four fighters to win both a Pride Championship and Grand Prix
  - Longest winning streak in PRIDE FC history (10)
  - Fastest Knockout in Pride FC History (0:06)
  - Fight of the Year (2005) vs. Tatsuya Kawajiri
- Ultimate Fighting Championship
  - Fight of the Night (Two times) vs. Mac Danzig and Isaac Vallie-Flagg
  - Knockout Of The Night (One time) vs. Tyson Griffin
  - One of only four Pride World Champions to compete in the UFC
  - One of only six Pride Grand Prix Champions to compete in the UFC
  - UFC.com Awards
    - 2010: Ranked #10 Knockout of the Year vs. Tyson Griffin
- Professional Shooto Japan
  - Shooto Lightweight Championship (One Time)
  - One successful title defense
  - Highest winning streak in Shooto History (12)
- Sherdog
  - Mixed Martial Arts Hall of Fame
  - Fighter of the Year (2005)
- MMA Fighting
  - 2004 Lightweight Fighter of the Year
  - 2005 Lightweight Fighter of the Year
  - 2006 Lightweight Fighter of the Year Runner-up
  - 2005 Knockout of the Year vs. Luiz Azeredo on May 22, 2005
- Fight Matrix
  - 2005 Fighter of the Year

=== Submission Wrestling ===
- Combat Wrestling
  - All-Japan Combat Wrestling Champion (Four times)

== Mixed martial arts record ==
Professional record breakdown
52 matches	36 wins	15 losses
By knockout	14	4
By submission	6	8
By decision	16	3
No contests	1	

Res.	Record	Opponent	Method	Event	Date	Round	Time	Location	Notes
Win	36–15 (1)	Melvin Guillard	KO (punches)	Rizin 11	July 29, 2018	1	2:33	Saitama, Japan	
Loss	35–15 (1)	Yusuke Yachi	Submission (triangle choke)	Rizin World Grand Prix 2017: Final Round	December 31, 2017	1	2:36	Saitama, Japan	
Loss	35–14 (1)	Dong Hyun Ma	TKO (punches)	UFC Fight Night: Saint Preux vs. Okami	September 23, 2017	1	1:30	Saitama, Japan	
Loss	35–13 (1)	Jon Tuck	Submission (rear-naked choke)	UFC Fight Night: Holm vs. Correia	June 17, 2017	1	1:12	Kallang, Singapore	
Loss	35–12 (1)	Jim Miller	TKO (punches)	UFC 200	July 9, 2016	1	2:18	Las Vegas, Nevada, United States	
Loss	35–11 (1)	Joe Lauzon	TKO (punches)	UFC on Fox: Dillashaw vs. Barão 2	July 25, 2015	1	2:37	Chicago, Illinois, United States	
Loss	35–10 (1)	Myles Jury	TKO (punches)	UFC Fight Night: Hunt vs. Nelson	September 20, 2014	1	1:32	Saitama, Japan	
Win	35–9 (1)	Isaac Vallie-Flagg	Decision (unanimous)	UFC 172	April 26, 2014	3	5:00	Baltimore, Maryland, United States	Fight of the Night.
Loss	34–9 (1)	Diego Sanchez	Decision (split)	UFC on Fuel TV: Silva vs. Stann	March 3, 2013	3	5:00	Saitama, Japan	
Win	34–8 (1)	Mac Danzig	Decision (split)	UFC on Fuel TV: Franklin vs. Le	November 10, 2012	3	5:00	Macau, SAR, China	Fight of the Night.
Win	33–8 (1)	Eiji Mitsuoka	TKO (punches)	UFC 144	February 26, 2012	2	2:21	Saitama, Japan	
Loss	32–8 (1)	Nate Diaz	Submission (armbar)	UFC 135	September 24, 2011	1	4:27	Denver, Colorado, United States	
Loss	32–7 (1)	Clay Guida	Submission (guillotine choke)	UFC 125	January 1, 2011	2	4:27	Las Vegas, Nevada, United States	
Win	32–6 (1)	Tyson Griffin	KO (punch)	UFC Live: Jones vs. Matyushenko	August 1, 2010	1	1:04	San Diego, California, United States	Knockout of the Night.
Loss	31–6 (1)	Kenny Florian	Submission (rear-naked choke)	UFC Fight Night: Florian vs. Gomi	March 31, 2010	3	2:52	Charlotte, North Carolina, United States	
Win	31–5 (1)	Tony Hervey	Decision (unanimous)	Vale Tudo Japan 2009	October 30, 2009	5	5:00	Tokyo, Japan	
Win	30–5 (1)	Takashi Nakakura	KO (punches)	Shooto: Shooto Tradition Final	May 10, 2009	2	4:42	Tokyo, Japan	
Loss	29–5 (1)	Satoru Kitaoka	Submission (Achilles lock)	World Victory Road Presents: Sengoku no Ran 2009	January 4, 2009	1	1:41	Saitama, Japan	For the Sengoku Lightweight Championship.
Loss	29–4 (1)	Sergey Golyaev	Decision (split)	World Victory Road Presents: Sengoku 6	November 1, 2008	3	5:00	Saitama, Japan	
Win	29–3 (1)	Tae Hyun Bang	Decision (unanimous)	World Victory Road Presents: Sengoku 4	August 24, 2008	3	5:00	Saitama, Japan	
Win	28–3 (1)	Duane Ludwig	TKO (doctor stoppage)	World Victory Road Presents: Sengoku First Battle	March 5, 2008	1	2:28	Tokyo, Japan	
NC	27–3 (1)	Nick Diaz	NC (overturned)	Pride 33	February 24, 2007	2	1:46	Las Vegas, Nevada, United States	Originally a submission (gogoplata) win for Diaz; overturned after he tested positive for marijuana.
Win	27–3	Mitsuhiro Ishida	TKO (soccer kick and punches)	Pride FC - Shockwave 2006	December 31, 2006	1	1:14	Saitama, Japan	Non-title bout.
Win	26–3	Marcus Aurélio	Decision (split)	Pride - Bushido 13	November 5, 2006	2	5:00	Yokohama, Japan	Defended the Pride Lightweight Championship.
Win	25–3	David Baron	Submission (rear-naked choke)	Pride - Bushido 12	August 26, 2006	1	7:10	Nagoya, Japan	Non-title bout.
Loss	24–3	Marcus Aurélio	Technical Submission (arm-triangle choke)	Pride - Bushido 10	April 2, 2006	1	4:34	Tokyo, Japan	Non-title bout.
Win	24–2	Hayato Sakurai	KO (punches)	Pride Shockwave 2005	December 31, 2005	1	3:56	Saitama, Japan	Won the Pride Lightweight Championship. Pride 2005 Lightweight Grand Prix Final.
Win	23–2	Luiz Azeredo	Decision (unanimous)	Pride Bushido 9	September 25, 2005	2	5:00	Tokyo, Japan	Pride 2005 Lightweight Grand Prix Semifinal.
Win	22–2	Tatsuya Kawajiri	Submission (rear-naked choke)	Pride Bushido 9	September 25, 2005	1	7:42	Tokyo, Japan	Pride 2005 Lightweight Grand Prix Quarterfinal.
Win	21–2	Jean Silva	Decision (unanimous)	Pride Bushido 8	July 17, 2005	2	5:00	Nagoya, Japan	
Win	20–2	Luiz Azeredo	KO (punches)	Pride Bushido 7	May 22, 2005	1	3:46	Tokyo, Japan	
Win	19–2	Jens Pulver	KO (punch)	Pride Shockwave 2004	December 31, 2004	1	6:21	Saitama, Japan	
Win	18–2	Charles Bennett	Technical Submission (kimura)	Pride Bushido 5	October 14, 2004	1	5:52	Osaka, Japan	
Win	17–2	Fábio Mello	TKO (punches)	Pride Bushido 4	July 19, 2004	1	8:07	Nagoya, Japan	
Win	16–2	Ralph Gracie	KO (knees)	Pride Bushido 3	May 23, 2004	1	0:06	Yokohama, Japan	Fastest knockout in Pride FC history.
Win	15–2	Jadyson Costa	TKO (punches)	Pride Bushido 2	February 15, 2004	1	4:55	Yokohama, Japan	
Loss	14–2	B.J. Penn	Submission (rear-naked choke)	Rumble on the Rock 4	October 10, 2003	3	2:35	Honolulu, Hawaii, United States	
Loss	14–1	Joachim Hansen	Decision (majority)	Shooto - 8/10 in Yokohama Cultural Gymnasium	August 10, 2003	3	5:00	Yokohama, Japan	Lost the Shooto World Lightweight Championship.
Win	14–0	Nick Ertl	Submission (armbar)	Shooto - 2/23 in Korakuen Hall	February 23, 2003	1	4:59	Tokyo, Japan	Non-title bout.
Win	13–0	Dokonjonosuke Mishima	TKO (punches)	Shooto: Year End Show 2002	December 14, 2002	2	0:52	Urayasu, Japan	Defended the Shooto World Lightweight Championship.
Win	12–0	Chris Brennan	Decision (unanimous)	Shooto: Treasure Hunt 10	September 16, 2002	3	5:00	Yokohama, Japan	Non-title bout.
Win	11–0	Leonardo Santos	Decision (majority)	Shooto: Treasure Hunt 7	June 29, 2002	3	5:00	Sakai, Japan	Non-title bout.
Win	10–0	Rumina Sato	Decision (unanimous)	Shooto: To The Top Final Act	December 16, 2001	3	5:00	Urayasu, Japan	Won the Shooto World Lightweight Championship.
Win	9–0	Ryan Bow	Decision (unanimous)	Shooto: R.E.A.D. 12	November 12, 2000	3	5:00	Tokyo, Japan	
Win	8–0	Paul Rodriguez	Decision (unanimous)	Shooto: R.E.A.D. 6	July 16, 2000	3	5:00	Tokyo, Japan	
Win	7–0	Huanderson Pavao	Decision (unanimous)	Shooto: R.E.A.D. 3	April 2, 2000	3	5:00	Kadoma, Japan	
Win	6–0	Johnny Eduardo	Submission (rear-naked choke)	Vale Tudo Japan 1999	December 11, 1999	3	1:43	Urayasu, Japan	
Win	5–0	Takuya Kawabara	Decision (unanimous)	Shooto: Renaxis 4	September 5, 1999	3	5:00	Tokyo, Japan	
Win	4–0	Stephen Palling	Submission (rear-naked choke)	SuperBrawl 12	June 1, 1999	1	3:06	Honolulu, Hawaii, United States	
Win	3–0	Takuya Kuwabara	Decision (unanimous)	Shooto: Renaxis 1	March 28, 1999	3	5:00	Tokyo, Japan	
Win	2–0	Kazumichi Takada	TKO (punches)	Shooto: Devilock Fighters	January 15, 1999	2	3:42	Tokyo, Japan	
Win	1–0	Hiroshi Tsuruya	Decision (unanimous)	Shooto: Las Grandes Viajes 6	November 27, 1998	3	5:00	Tokyo, Japan	

== Submission grappling record ==
Result	Opponent	Method	Event	Date	Round	Time	Notes
Loss	(United States) Sean O'Malley	Submission (guillotine choke)	Quintet Ultra	2019	1	2:47	
Loss	(Japan) Arawa Hosokawa	Points	Professional Jiu Ground Impact	2015	1		
Win	(Japan) Sanshiro Nakakura	Points	ADCC ASIA TRIAL 2011 –77 kg	2011			
Win	(Japan) Hikarishi Matsumoto	Points	ADCC ASIA TRIAL 2011 –77 kg	2011			
Win	(Japan) Tetsuya Yamada	Points	ADCC ASIA TRIAL 2011 –77 kg	2011			
Win	(Japan) Ryunosuke Yamamoto	Points	ADCC ASIA TRIAL 2011 –77 kg	2011			
Loss	(United States) Shane Roller	Submission (rear naked choke)	UFC Fan Expo	2010	1		
Win	(Japan) Caol Uno	Decision	The CONTENDERS 6	2001	3		
Win	(Japan) Yuji Hoshino	Decision	The CONTENDERS Millennium-1	2001	2		
Loss	(United States) Matt Serra	Submission (rear naked choke)	ADCC 2001 –77 kg	2001	1		
Loss	(Japan) Yasushi Miyake	Decision	The CONTENDERS 2	1999	2		

== See also ==
- List of male mixed martial artists
- List of Pride Champions
- List of Shooto Champions

Vacant Title last held by Caol Uno	5th Shooto Lightweight Champion; December 16, 2001 – August 10, 2003	Succeeded by Joachim Hansen
New championship	Pride FC Lightweight Tournament winner December 31, 2005	Pride FC folded
New championship	1st Pride Lightweight Champion; December 31, 2005	Pride FC folded
