= Rumina Sato =

Japanese mixed martial arts fighter

Rumina Sato 佐藤 ルミナ
- Born: Satō Rumina 佐藤 留美奈; December 29, 1973 (age 52); Odawara, Kanagawa, Japan
- Other names: "Tsukiookami" (Moon Wolf), "Shooto Charisma"
- Nationality: Japanese
- Height: 5 ft 6 in (1.68 m)
- Weight: 143 lb (65 kg; 10 st 3 lb)
- Division: Featherweight (145 lb); Lightweight (155 lb)
- Style: Submission wrestling
- Team: Roots; K'z Factory (1994-2005)
- Teachers: Satoru Sayama; Noboru Asahi; Noriaki Kiguchi
- Rank: Brown belt in Brazilian jiu-jitsu
- Years active: 1994 - present

Mixed martial arts record
- Total: 45
- Wins: 26
- By knockout: 5
- By submission: 18
- By decision: 3
- Losses: 17
- By knockout: 10
- By submission: 5
- By decision: 2
- Draws: 2

Other information
- Mixed martial arts record from Sherdog

Rumina Sato (佐藤 ルミナ, Satō Rumina; born December 29, 1973) (Japanese pronunciation: [satoː ɾɯmina], kanji for given name: 留美奈) is a Japanese retired mixed martial artist, famous for his career in the Shooto organization. In the past he fought mostly in the 155 lb division, but he moved down to the 145 lb division.

== Mixed martial arts career ==
After graduating from high school, Sato had to spend a year as a ronin and started to train in shoot wrestling under Noboru Asahi and Noriaki Kiguchi in the Kiguchi Dojo, partnered with the Shooto promotion. He later moved to amateur wrestling after being admitted in the Nippon Sport Science University, and after graduating in 1994 and competing in the All Japan Amateur Shoot Championships, he joined professionally the company.

=== Shooto ===
After honing his submission skills under Satoru Sayama, Sato made his professional debut in MMA on December 7, 1994, winning over Michael McAuliffe with a calf slicer, the first time the move had been used in mixed martial arts. He ascended fastly in the roster by winning 10 straight matches, becoming a fan favourite for his aggressive and spectacular style of grappling. As soon as his fourth match, he submitted his opponent with a flying inverted triangle choke, and at his seventh, he gained worldwide fame by submitting the Brazilian jiu-jitsu black belt Ricardo Botelho, taking advantage of his guard usage to attack him with leglocks and submit him with a heel hook. Sato also defeated another big name of the art when he beat John Lewis, who he submitted in revenge for a match at the Vale Tudo Japan which ended in a draw. Sato would become a usual fighter for this event, representing Shooto in six out of the nine years it had place.

Sato's winning streak finally broke in 1998 when he lost a highly publicized match to Canadian Jiu-Jitsu Champion Joel Gerson by a surprising armbar in the first round of a non-title event in 1998. Sato avenged his defeat in the next Canadian Jiu-Jitsu open tournament the same year, where he faced Gerson again at the finals and submitted him with an ankle lock. After returning to Japan, Sato got also which is thought to be the fastest submission victory in MMA history when he submitted Charles Diaz in a mere five seconds with a flying armbar.

At Vale Tudo Japan 1998, Sato went against André Pederneiras of the Nova União in a vale tudo rules match. Sato suffered the first takedown, but he almost caught Pederneiras with a persistent armbar. The two exchanged minor strikes in Sato's guard before the Brazilian grappler decided to stand-up, and the match seemed to go stall from their respective positions. However, suddenly Pederneiras sidestepped Sato and landed a soccer kick to the head, following with heavy punches to the face for the doctor stoppage.

On May 29, 1999, he would fight former trainee Caol Uno for the vacated Shooto Welterweight Championship. Sato captured Uno's back mere two minutes into the match and pursued the rear naked choke, but despite threatening to lock the hold at several points, Uno managed to escape free. Going into the second round, Sato controlled the stand-up, opening a cut on the right side of his opponent's face and scoring a takedown, but he found himself having to defend from his guard while Uno capitalized to land ground and pound. At the third round, Uno started controlling the wrestling game and solidifying his assault to Sato's guard, and ultimately, when a clearly tired Rumina attempted a takedown, Caol took his back and locked a rear naked choke for the tap out.

Sato returned to Vale Tudo Japan in 1999 fighting Rafael Cordeiro, founder and instructor for the famed Chute Boxe team. The match was short, as Rumina scored a belly to belly suplex and right after locked a kneebar, making Cordeiro tap out.

Rumina rematched Uno in December 2000 for the title. In a cautious and tentative affair, Sato captured the back of his opponent while standing and attempted to lock a choke while Uno defended with a Kimura lock threat, but none was successful. However, when Sato finally released him, Uno capitalized on his bad position and landed a knee strike to the face and a right punch to the temple, knocking Sato out.

After his second defeat to Uno, Sato faced Marcio Ramos Barbosa of Barbosa Jiu-Jitsu, who had submitted Caol before the rematch. Sato won the fight by unanimous decision.

In December 2001, Sato faced rising star Takanori Gomi for the vacated Shooto World Lightweight Championship. Playing clinch to avoid his foe's dangerous striking, Rumina led the fight to the mat and besieged Gomi with submissions attempts, including armbars both from and against the guard, toeholds from inverted positions and an omoplata that almost finished the fight, but Takanori was consistently able of getting out of them. The second round saw Gomi landing damaging punches, as well as Sato utilizing an active guard to counterattack, and the striker eventually bypassing his defenses and controlling the pace. Come the third and final, Gomi landed the last punches against the guard before winning the bout by unanimous decision.

Despite PRIDE Fighting Championships and Ultimate Fighting Championship being both interested in signing him up, Rumina famously vowed to never compete in any other organization than Shooto (unless representing Shooto in special matches) until he won a title there. He won the Shooto Pacific Rim Lightweight Tournament on March 11, 2005, from Makoto Ishikawa, but still remained in the promotion until his retirement in May 2014.

On July 10, 2009, Sato competed in a grappling super fight at the UFC 100 Fan Expo Grappler's Quest against Ulysses Gomez, winning by submission with an inverted triangle choke/wrist lock combination.

== Fighting style ==
Sato was primarily a grappler whose main strength was found in his offensive skills. He would attempt submissions relentlessly from unusual positions and entries, and was prone to try and often accomplish low percentage moves, among them flying holds, intricate leglocks, and several variations of triangle chokes, which he utilized to set up ground and pound and other submissions. His technique was praised by Rickson Gracie, labelling it as "excellent." Though later years showed a weakened chin as his main weak spot, Sato was also an aggressive striker, sometimes indulging in moves like spinning backfists and axe kicks.

== Championships and accomplishments ==
- Shooto
  - Shooto Pacific Rim Lightweight Championship (1 Time, First)
  - 1994 All Japan Amateur Shooto Championship, Welterweight Runner Up
  - 1st Shooto Pacific Rim Lightweight Tournament Champion (March 11, 2005)
- Ultimate Fighting Championship
  - Grapplers Quest at UFC Fan Expo Superfight Champion Las Vegas (July 10, 2009)

== Mixed martial arts record ==
Professional record breakdown
45 matches	26 wins	17 losses
By knockout	5	10
By submission	18	5
By decision	3	2
Draws	2	

Res.	Record	Opponent	Method	Event	Date	Round	Time	Location	Notes
Loss	26–17–2	Hideo Tokoro	TKO (punches & elbows)	Vale Tudo Japan 2012	December 24, 2012	1	0:39	Tokyo, Japan	
Loss	26–16–2	Nico Verresen	KO (punch)	Shooto: Shooto the Shoot 2011	November 5, 2011	1	4:17	Tokyo, Japan	
Loss	26–15–2	Masakatsu Ueda	TKO (kick to the body)	Shooto: Shootor's Legacy 3	July 18, 2011	1	4:23	Tokyo, Japan	
Win	26–14–2	Ryota Matsune	TKO (knee & punches)	Shooto: The Way of Shooto 3: Like a Tiger, Like a Dragon	May 30, 2010	2	0:21	Tokyo, Japan	
Win	25–14–2	Corey Grant	TKO (punches)	VTJ 2009: Vale Tudo Japan 2009	October 30, 2009	1	3:20	Tokyo, Japan	
Loss	24–14–2	Takeshi Inoue	TKO (punches)	Shooto: Shooto Tradition Final	May 10, 2009	1	4:41	Tokyo, Japan	For Shooto Lightweight (143 lbs.) Championship
Loss	24–13–2	Hatsu Hioki	TKO (punches)	Shooto: Shooto Tradition 4	November 29, 2008	1	3:32	Tokyo, Japan	
Loss	24–12–2	Akitoshi Tamura	Submission (north-south choke)	Shooto: Shooto Tradition 1	May 3, 2008	3	2:37	Tokyo, Japan	
Loss	24–11–2	Hideki Kadowaki	Submission (rear-naked choke)	Shooto: Back To Our Roots 5	September 22, 2007	1	4:09	Tokyo, Japan	
Win	24–10–2	Augusto Frota	TKO (cut)	Shooto: Back To Our Roots 2	March 16, 2007	1	1:21	Tokyo, Japan	
Loss	23–10–2	Antonio Carvalho	TKO (punches)	Shooto: The Victory of the Truth	February 17, 2006	2	0:49	Tokyo, Japan	
Loss	23–9–2	Gilbert Melendez	TKO (cut)	Shooto: Alive Road	August 20, 2005	1	1:32	Kanagawa, Japan	
Win	23–8–2	Makoto Ishikawa	Decision (unanimous)	Shooto: 3/11 in Korakuen Hall	March 11, 2005	3	5:00	Tokyo, Japan	For Shooto Pacific Rim Lightweight Championship
Win	22–8–2	Katsuya Toida	KO (punch)	Shooto: Year End Show 2004	December 14, 2004	2	1:21	Tokyo, Japan	
Win	21–8–2	Bao Quach	Submission (armbar)	Shooto Hawaii: Soljah Fight Night	July 9, 2004	1	3:04	Honolulu, Hawaii, United States	
Win	20–8–2	Erikas Petraitis	Technical Submission (triangle choke)	Shooto 2004: 5/3 in Korakuen Hall	May 3, 2004	2	2:20	Tokyo, Japan	
Loss	19–8–2	Alexandre Franca Nogueira	Submission (guillotine choke)	Shooto: Year End Show 2003	December 14, 2003	1	0:41	Chiba, Japan	
Win	19–7–2	Ryan Ackerman	Submission (heel hook)	Shooto 2003: 6/27 in Hiroshima Sun Plaza	June 27, 2003	1	2:12	Hiroshima, Japan	
Loss	18–7–2	Joachim Hansen	TKO (punches)	Shooto: 3/18 in Korakuen Hall	March 18, 2003	1	2:09	Tokyo, Japan	
Draw	18–6–2	Takumi Nakayama	Draw	Shooto: Treasure Hunt 11	November 15, 2002	3	5:00	Tokyo, Japan	
Loss	18–6–1	Javier Vazquez	Decision (unanimous)	Shooto: Treasure Hunt 7	June 29, 2002	3	5:00	Osaka, Japan	
Loss	18–5–1	Takanori Gomi	Decision (unanimous)	Shooto: To The Top Final Act	December 16, 2001	3	5:00	Chiba, Japan	For Shooto World Welterweight (154 lbs.) Championship
Win	18–4–1	Marcio Ramos Barbosa	Decision (unanimous)	Shooto: To The Top 7	August 26, 2001	3	5:00	Osaka, Japan	
Loss	17–4–1	Caol Uno	KO (punch)	Shooto: R.E.A.D. Final	December 17, 2000	1	2:21	Chiba, Japan	For Shooto World Welterweight (154 lbs.) Championship
Win	17–3–1	Takuya Kuwabara	Technical Decision (unanimous)	Shooto: R.E.A.D. 9	August 27, 2000	2	5:00	Kanagawa, Japan	
Win	16–3–1	Yves Edwards	Submission (rear-naked choke)	SB 17: SuperBrawl 17	April 15, 2000	1	0:18	Honolulu, Hawaii, United States	
Win	15–3–1	Rafael Cordeiro	Submission (kneebar)	VTJ 1999: Vale Tudo Japan 1999	December 11, 1999	1	0:58	Chiba, Japan	
Win	14–3–1	Phil Johns	Submission (toe hold)	Shooto: Renaxis 5	October 29, 1999	1	0:54	Osaka, Japan	
Loss	13–3–1	Caol Uno	Submission (rear-naked choke)	Shooto: 10th Anniversary Event	May 29, 1999	3	4:02	Yokohama, Japan	For Shooto World Welterweight (154 lbs.) Championship
Win	13–2–1	Charles Diaz	Submission (flying armbar)	Shooto: Devilock Fighters	January 15, 1999	1	0:06	Tokyo, Japan	
Loss	12–2–1	André Pederneiras	KO (soccer kick & punches)	VTJ 1998: Vale Tudo Japan 1998	October 25, 1998	1	4:20	Chiba, Japan	
Win	12–1–1	Michael Buell	Submission (armbar)	Shooto: Shoot the Shooto XX	April 26, 1998	1	0:31	Tokyo, Japan	
Loss	11–1–1	Joel Gerson	Technical Submission (armbar)	Shooto: Las Grandes Viajes 2	March 1, 1998	1	3:53	Tokyo, Japan	
Win	11–0–1	John Lewis	Submission (armbar)	VTJ 1997: Vale Tudo Japan 1997	November 29, 1997	2	1:23	Chiba, Japan	
Win	10–0–1	Maurice Corty	Submission (kimura)	Shooto: Reconquista 4	October 12, 1997	1	2:01	Tokyo, Japan	
Win	9–0–1	Alan Fried	Submission (armbar)	Shooto: Reconquista 3	August 27, 1997	1	0:59	Tokyo, Japan	
Win	8–0–1	Ali Mihoubi	Submission (heel hook)	Shooto: Reconquista 2	April 6, 1997	1	2:21	Tokyo, Japan	
Win	7–0–1	Ricardo Botelho	Submission (heel hook)	Shooto: Reconquista 1	January 18, 1997	3	1:24	Tokyo, Japan	
Draw	6–0–1	John Lewis	Draw	VTJ 1996: Vale Tudo Japan 1996	July 7, 1996	3	8:00	Chiba, Japan	
Win	6–0	Kyuhei Ueno	Submission (rear-naked choke)	Shooto: Vale Tudo Junction 2	March 5, 1996	1	4:04	Tokyo, Japan	
Win	5–0	Masato Suzuki	Technical Submission (armbar)	Shooto: Vale Tudo Junction 1	January 20, 1996	1	3:00	Tokyo, Japan	
Win	4–0	Isamu Osugi	Technical Submission (flying inverted triangle choke)	Shooto: Vale Tudo Perception	September 26, 1995	1	2:01	Tokyo, Japan	
Win	3–0	Ron Balicki	Technical Submission (armbar)	Shooto: Complete Vale Tudo Access	July 29, 1995	1	2:14	Saitama, Japan	
Win	2–0	Katsuaki Yano	TKO (punches)	Shooto: Yokohama Free Fight	June 4, 1995	1	2:23	Tokyo, Japan	
Win	1–0	Michael McAuliffe	Submission (calf slicer)	Shooto: Vale Tudo Access 2	November 7, 1994	2	2:18	Tokyo, Japan	

=== Mixed martial arts exhibition record ===
Exhibition record breakdown		
0 matches	0 wins	0 losses
By knockout	0	0
By submission	0	0
By decision	0	0

Res.	Record	Opponent	Method	Event	Date	Round	Time	Location	Notes
Draw	0-0-1	Hayato Sakurai	Technical Draw	World＆Wild 1	April 4, 2008	1	3:00	Tokyo, Japan	

== Submission grappling record ==
KO PUNCHES

Result	Opponent	Method	Event	Date	Round	Time	Notes
Win	(Japan) Hideki Mizutani	Submission (neckscissors)	All Japan Masters 3	2015			
Win	(Japan) Hirokazu Saito	Submission (achilles lock)	All Japan Masters 3	2015			
Loss	(Japan) Yoshihiko Matsumoto	Points	Shooto Gig Saitama 01	2009			
Win	(United States) Ulysses Gomez	Submission (reverse triangle wrist lock)	UFC Fan Expo	2009			
Win	(Japan) Masakazu Imanari	Submission (rear-naked choke)	7th All Japan Combat Wrestling Championship -76 kg	2001			Finals
Win	(Japan) Shigefumi Matsunaga	Submission (rear-naked choke)	7th All Japan Combat Wrestling Championship -76 kg	2001			Semi-finals
Win	(Japan) Torushi Kuroda	Submission (kneebar)	7th All Japan Combat Wrestling Championship -76 kg	2001			Quarter-finals
Win	(Japan) Yuki Takaya	Points	7th All Japan Combat Wrestling Championship -76 kg	2001			Opening round
Loss	(United States) Tito Ortiz	Technical Submission (north-south choke)	ADCC 2000 Openweight	2000			First round
Loss	(United States) Vítor Ribeiro	Points	ADCC 2000 –77 kg	2000			First round
Loss	(Brazil) Marcio Feitosa	Points	Canadian Jiu-Jitsu	1998			Finals
Win	(Canada) Joel Gerson	Submission (ankle lock)	Canadian Jiu-Jitsu	1998			

== Kickboxing record ==
Kickboxing record
1 win (1 KO), 0 losses
Date	Result	Opponent	Event	Location	Method	Round	Time	Record
February 11, 2009	Win	(United States) Mike Campbell	Shoot Boxing 2009: Takeshi Do Bushido Tag 1	Tokyo, Japan	TKO (corner stoppage)	2	2:14	1-0
Legend: Win Loss Draw/No contest

== See also ==
- List of male mixed martial artists
