= Hayato (given name) =

Name list

- hayato ikeda a Prime Minister of Japan from 1960 to 1964
- Gender: Male

Origin
- Origin: Japanese
- Meaning: Different meanings depending on the kanji used

Hayato (written: 勇人, 勇斗, 勇登, 隼, 隼人, 隼斗, 速人, 早人, 早十, 駿斗 or 颯斗) is a masculine Japanese given name. Notable people with the name include:

- Hayato Aoki (青木 勇人; born 1977), Japanese baseball player
- Hayato Arakaki (新垣 勇人; born 1985), Japanese baseball player
- Hayato Araki (荒木 隼人; born 1996), Japanese footballer
- Hayato Chiba (千葉 逸人; born 1982), Japanese mathematician
- Hayato Date (伊達 勇登), Japanese anime director
- Hayato Fujita (藤田 勇人; born 1986), Japanese professional wrestler
- Hayato Hashimoto (橋本 早十; born 1981), Japanese footballer
- Hayato Ichihara (市原 隼人; born 1987), Japanese actor
- Hayato Ikeda (池田 勇人; 1899–1965), Japanese politician and Prime Minister
- Hayato Isomura (磯村 勇斗; born 1992), Japanese actor
- Hayato Juumonji (born 1967), or Takehito Koyasu, Japanese voice actor
- Kitakachidoki Hayato (北勝鬨 準人; born 1966), Japanese sumo wrestler
- Hayato Matsuo (松尾 早人; born 1965), Japanese composer
- Hayato Nakama (仲間 隼斗; born 1992), Japanese footballer
- Hayato Okamoto (disambiguation), multiple people
- Hayato Okamura (born 1966), Czech politician
- Hayato Okanaka (岡中 勇人; born 1968), Japanese footballer
- Hayato Onozuka (小野塚 勇人; born 1993), Japanese actor
- Hayato Otani (大谷 駿斗; born 1997), Japanese footballer
- Hayato Sakamoto (坂本 勇人; born 1988), Japanese baseball player
- Hayato Sakurai (桜井 速人; born 1975), Japanese mixed martial artist
- Hayato Sasaki (佐々木 勇人; born 1982), Japanese footballer
- Hayato Sumino (角野隼斗; born 1995), Japanese pianist
- Hayato Takagi (高木 勇人; born 1989), Japanese baseball player
- Hayato Tani (谷 隼人; born 1946), Japanese actor
- Hayato Terahara (寺原 隼人; born 1983), Japanese baseball player
- Hayato Yano (矢野 隼人; born 1980), Japanese footballer
- Hayato Yoshida (吉田 隼人; born 1989), Japanese cyclist
- Daieishō Hayato (大栄翔 勇人; born 1993), Japanese sumo wrestler

== Fictional characters ==
- Hayato Akiyama, a character in The Idolmaster SideM video game series
- Hayato Gokudera, a character in Katekyo Hitman Reborn! manga and anime
- Hayato Jin, a character in Getter Robo manga and anime
- Hayato Kanzaki, a character in Star Gladiator video game series
- Hayato Kawajiri, a character in JoJo's Bizarre Adventure manga and anime
- Hayato Kazami the main character of Future GPX Cyber Formula
- Hayato Kobayashi, a character in Mobile Suit Gundam
- Hayato Maeda or Chumley Huffington, a character in Yu-Gi-Oh! Duel Monsters GX anime
- Hayato Matatagi, a character in Inazuma Eleven GO Galaxy
- Hayato Nekketsu, a character from the Rival Schools video game series
