= Marcelo Aguiar =

Brazilian mixed martial arts fighter

- Born: Brazil
- Nationality: Brazilian
- Height: 5 ft 8 in (1.73 m)
- Weight: 168 lb (76 kg; 12.0 st)
- Division: Welterweight
- Years active: 1997 - 2000

Mixed martial arts record
- Total: 6
- Wins: 2
- By knockout: 1
- By submission: 1
- Losses: 3
- By knockout: 2
- By decision: 1
- Draws: 1

Other information
- Mixed martial arts record from Sherdog

Marcelo Aguiar is a Brazilian mixed martial artist. He competed in the Welterweight division.

== Mixed martial arts career ==
Aguiar made his professional debut against John Cronk at World Vale Tudo Championship 4 on 16 March 1997, in the semifinals of the Vale Tudo 77 kg tournament. He won the fight by a rear-naked choke, after almost ten minutes of continuous fighting, and advanced to the finals where he faced Antonio Santos. Aguiar won the tournament final by knockout, stopping Santos after just 49 seconds.

Aguiar was scheduled to face Hayato Sakurai at VTJ 1997: Vale Tudo Japan 1997 on 29 November 1997. The fight ended in a draw. The two of them fought a rematch at Shooto: 10th Anniversary Event on 29 May 1999. Sakurai won their second meeting by unanimous decision.

Aguiar's last professional bout was against Matt Hughes at UFC 26: Ultimate Field of Dreams on 9 June 2000. Hughes won the fight by technical knockout, after the ringside doctor stopped the fight near the end of the first round.

== Mixed martial arts record ==
Professional record breakdown
6 matches	2 wins	3 losses
By knockout	1	2
By submission	1	0
By decision	0	1
Draws	1	

Res.	Record	Opponent	Method	Event	Date	Round	Time	Location	Notes
Loss	2–3–1	Matt Hughes	TKO (doctor stoppage)	UFC 26	9 June 2000	1	4:34	Cedar Rapids, Iowa, United States	
Loss	2–2–1	Hayato Sakurai	Decision (unanimous)	Shooto: 10th Anniversary Event	29 May 1999	3	5:00	Yokohama, Kanagawa, Japan	
Loss	2–1–1	Frank Trigg	TKO (punches)	Shooto: Las Grandes Viajes 3	13 May 1998	2	3:08	Tokyo, Japan	
Draw	2–0–1	Hayato Sakurai	Draw	VTJ 1997: Vale Tudo Japan 1997	29 November 1997	3	8:00	Urayasu, Chiba, Japan	
Win	2–0	Antonio Santos	KO (punches)	WVC 4: World Vale Tudo Championship 4	16 March 1997	1	0:49	Brazil	
Win	1–0	John Cronk	Submission (rear-naked choke)	WVC 4: World Vale Tudo Championship 4	16 March 1997	1	9:49	Brazil	

== See also ==
- List of male mixed martial artists
