= Yuji Fujita =

American martial artist

Yuji Fujita 藤田雄二
- Born: Japan
- Nationality: Japanese
- Years active: 1994–1998

Mixed martial arts record
- Total: 7
- Wins: 1
- By decision: 1
- Losses: 6
- By submission: 3
- By decision: 3

Other information
- Mixed martial arts record from Sherdog

Yuji Fujita (Japanese: 藤田雄二 is a Japanese mixed martial artist.

== Mixed martial arts record ==
Professional record breakdown
7 matches	1 win	6 losses
By submission	0	3
By decision	1	3

Res.	Record	Opponent	Method	Event	Date	Round	Time	Location	Notes
Loss	1–6	Caol Uno	Decision (unanimous)	Shooto - Las Grandes Viajes 2	March 1, 1998	2	5:00	Tokyo, Japan	
Loss	1–5	Mohammad Jarban	Decision (unanimous)	Shooto - Reconquista 2	April 6, 1997	2	5:00	Tokyo, Japan	
Loss	1–4	Hiroyuki Kojima	Decision (unanimous)	Shooto - Reconquista 1	January 18, 1997	3	3:00	Kawasaki, Kanagawa, Japan	
Win	1–3	Yuzo Tateishi	Decision (unanimous)	Shooto - Free Fight Kawasaki	July 28, 1996	3	3:00	Tokyo, Japan	
Loss	0–3	Tomoaki Hayama	Submission (rear naked choke)	Shooto - Vale Tudo Junction 3	May 7, 1996	2	2:25	Tokyo, Japan	
Loss	0–2	Takuya Kuwabara	Technical Submission (armbar)	Shooto - Vale Tudo Junction 1	January 20, 1996	2	2:15	Tokyo, Japan	
Loss	0–1	Yasunori Okuda	Submission (armbar)	Shooto - Shooto	March 18, 1994	1	0:25	Tokyo, Japan	

== See also ==
- List of male mixed martial artists
