= Isamu Osugi =

Japanese mixed martial artist

Isamu Osugi 大杉勇
- Born: Japan
- Nationality: Japanese
- Years active: 1995 - 1996

Mixed martial arts record
- Total: 5
- Wins: 0
- Losses: 5
- By submission: 5

Other information
- Mixed martial arts record from Sherdog

Isamu Osugi Japanese: 大杉勇 is a Japanese mixed martial artist.

== Mixed martial arts record ==
Professional record breakdown
5 matches	0 wins	5 losses
By submission	0	5

Res.	Record	Opponent	Method	Event	Date	Round	Time	Location	Notes
Loss	0–5	Kazunari Murakami	Submission (armlock)	Lumax Cup: Tournament of J '96	March 30, 1996	1	4:10	Japan	
Loss	0–4	Masanori Suda	Submission (armbar)	Shooto: Vale Tudo Junction 2	March 5, 1996	2	2:57	Tokyo, Japan	
Loss	0–3	Tomoaki Hayama	Submission (guillotine choke)	Shooto: Tokyo Free Fight	November 7, 1995	2	2:10	Tokyo, Japan	
Loss	0–2	Yuichi Otsuka	Submission (armbar)	Lumax Cup: Tournament of J '95	October 13, 1995	1	0:42	Japan	
Loss	0–1	Rumina Sato	Technical Submission (flying reverse triangle choke)	Shooto: Vale Tudo Perception	September 26, 1995	1	2:01	Setagaya, Tokyo, Japan	

== See also ==
- List of male mixed martial artists
