= 1996 in Shooto =

Mixed martial arts events

Information
- First date: January 20, 1996
- Last date: October 4, 1996

Events
- Total events: 5

Fights
- Total fights: 43

Chronology
1995 in Shooto	1996 in Shooto	1997 in Shooto

The year 1996 is the 8th year in the history of Shooto, a mixed martial arts promotion based in the Japan. In 1996 Shooto held 5 events beginning with, Shooto: Vale Tudo Junction 1.

== Events list ==
#	Event title	Date	Arena	Location
42	Shooto: Let's Get Lost	October 4, 1996	Korakuen Hall	Tokyo, Japan
41	Shooto: Free Fight Kawasaki	July 28, 1996	Club Citta	Kawasaki, Kanagawa, Japan
40	Shooto: Vale Tudo Junction 3	May 7, 1996	Korakuen Hall	Tokyo, Japan
39	Shooto: Vale Tudo Junction 2	March 5, 1996	Korakuen Hall	Tokyo, Japan
38	Shooto: Vale Tudo Junction 1	January 20, 1996	Korakuen Hall	Tokyo, Japan

== Shooto: Vale Tudo Junction 1 ==
Shooto: Vale Tudo Junction 1 was an event held on January 20, 1996, at Korakuen Hall in Tokyo, Japan.

=== Results ===
Main Card
Weight class				Method	Round	Time	Notes
	Enson Inoue	def.	Andre Mannaart	TKO (Punches)	1	3:20
	Erik Paulson	def.	Todd Bjornethun	Submission (Guillotine Choke)	2	0:26
	Noboru Asahi	def.	Ruud Alwart	Submission (Punches)	1	1:21
	Kyuhei Ueno	def.	Arnold Sas	Submission (Triangle/Armbar)	3	0:44
	Rumina Sato	def.	Masato Suzuki	Technical Submission (Armbar)	1	3:00
	Jutaro Nakao	def.	Yasunori Okuda	TKO (Punches)	1	1:18
	Uchu Tatsumi	def.	Kimihito Nonaka	Decision (Majority)	3	3:00
	Masanori Suda	def.	Genta Haga	Technical Submission (Armbar)	1	1:02
	Hisao Ikeda	def.	Yoshiyuki Takayama	Submission (Kimura)	3	2:57
	Takuya Kuwabara	def.	Yuji Fujita	Technical Submission (Armbar)	2	2:15

== Shooto: Vale Tudo Junction 2 ==
Shooto: Vale Tudo Junction 2 was an event held on March 5, 1996, at Korakuen Hall in Tokyo, Japan.

=== Results ===
Main Card
Weight class				Method	Round	Time	Notes
	Noboru Asahi	def.	Leandro Lima De Azevedo	Technical Submission (Heel Hook)	1	1:04
	Rumina Sato	def.	Kyuhei Ueno	Submission (Rear-Naked Choke)	1	4:04
	Egan Inoue	def.	Gordon Dehdman	Submission (Triangle Choke)	1	1:39
	Kazuhiro Kusayanagi	def.	Toru Koga	Submission (Armbar)	4	2:14
	Mamoru Okochi	def.	Anthony Lange	Decision (Majority)	5	3:00
	Jutaro Nakao	def.	Naoto Kojima	Submission (Rear-Naked Choke)	2	1:42
	Masahiro Oishi	vs.	Hisao Ikeda	Draw	3	3:00
	Jin Akimoto	def.	Yoshinori Haraigawa	Technical Submission (Rear-Naked Choke)	1	1:42
	Masanori Suda	def.	Isamu Osugi	Submission (Armbar)	2	2:57
	Takuya Kuwabara	def.	Shinji Arano	Technical Submission (Armbar)	2	1:42

== Shooto: Vale Tudo Junction 3 ==
Shooto: Vale Tudo Junction 3 was an event held on May 7, 1996, at Korakuen Hall in Tokyo, Japan.

=== Results ===
Main Card
Weight class				Method	Round	Time	Notes
	Erik Paulson	def.	Kenji Kawaguchi	Submission (Toe Hold)	3	1:23
	Joe Estes	def.	Enson Inoue	Decision (Majority)	3	8:00
	Todd Bjornethun	def.	Akihiro Gono	Submission (Armbar)	3	1:12
	Yasushi Warita	def.	Toru Koga	KO (Head Kick)	3	0:18
	Uchu Tatsumi	def.	Hisao Ikeda	KO (Punches)	1	0:47
	Takuya Kuwabara	def.	Masakazu Kuramochi	Decision (Split)	3	3:00
	Jin Akimoto	vs.	Mitsuhiro Sakamoto	Draw	3	3:00
	Tomoaki Hayama	def.	Yuji Fujita	Submission (Rear Naked Choke)	2	2:25
	Kimihito Nonaka	def.	Shinji Arano	Submission (Triangle Choke)	2	1:41

== Shooto: Free Fight Kawasaki ==
Shooto: Free Fight Kawasaki was an event held on July 28, 1996, at Club Citta in Kawasaki, Kanagawa, Japan.

=== Results ===
Main Card
Weight class				Method	Round	Time	Notes
	Akihiro Gono	def.	Masanori Suda	Submission (Rear-Naked Choke)	4	0:33
	Takuya Kuwabara	def.	Naoto Kojima	Decision (Majority)	3	3:00
	Hisao Ikeda	def.	Katsuhisa Akasaki	Decision (Majority)	3	3:00
	Yuji Fujita	def.	Yuzo Tateishi		Decision (Unanimous)	3

== Shooto: Let's Get Lost ==
Shooto: Let's Get Lost was an event held on October 4, 1996, at Korakuen Hall in Tokyo, Japan.

=== Results ===
Main Card
Weight class				Method	Round	Time	Notes
	Enson Inoue	def.	Mushtaq Abdullah	Submission (Punches)	1	0:38
	Alex Cook	def.	Jutaro Nakao	Submission (Rear-Naked Choke)	2	1:50
	Kazuhiro Kusayanagi	def.	Akihiro Gono	Submission (Armbar)	4	2:52
	Uchu Tatsumi	def.	Sunay Ahmed	Submission (Rear-Naked Choke)	1	0:51
	Masato Fujiwara	def.	Masanori Suda	Submission (Triangle Armbar)	1	2:15
	Mitsuhiro Sakamoto	def.	Jin Akimoto	Decision (Majority)	3	3:00
	Hisao Ikeda	def.	Kenzi Daikanyama	Decision (Majority)	3	3:00
	Masahiro Oishi	def.	Katsuhisa Akasaki	Submission (Armbar)	1	2:12
	Hiroyuki Kojima	def.	Yuzo Tateishi	Submission (Kimura)	1	3:00
	Hayato Sakurai	def.	Caol Uno	Submission (Armbar)	1	2:52

== See also ==
- Shooto
- List of Shooto champions
- List of Shooto Events
