= Naoto Kojima =

Japanese mixed martial arts fighter

Naoto Kojima 小島直人
- Born: Japan
- Nationality: Japanese
- Height: 5 ft 7 in (1.70 m)
- Weight: 143 lb (65 kg; 10.2 st)
- Division: Featherweight
- Team: Paraestra Tokyo
- Years active: 1996 - 2002

Mixed martial arts record
- Total: 7
- Wins: 1
- By decision: 1
- Losses: 5
- By knockout: 1
- By submission: 2
- By decision: 2
- Draws: 1

Other information
- Mixed martial arts record from Sherdog

Naoto Kojima Japanese: 小島直人 is a Japanese mixed martial artist. He competed in the Featherweight division.

== Mixed martial arts record ==
Professional record breakdown
7 matches	1 win	5 losses
By knockout	0	1
By submission	0	2
By decision	1	2
Draws	1	

Res.	Record	Opponent	Method	Event	Date	Round	Time	Location	Notes
Draw	1–5–1	Fumio Usami	Draw	Shooto: Gig East 11	September 25, 2002	2	5:00	Tokyo, Japan	
Loss	1–5	Mitsuhiro Ishida	TKO (punches)	Shooto: Gig East 7	November 26, 2001	2	1:58	Tokyo, Japan	
Win	1–4	Naoki Matsushita	Decision (unanimous)	Shooto: Gig East 5	August 15, 2001	2	5:00	Tokyo, Japan	
Loss	0–4	Hiroki Kotani	Submission (heel hook)	Lumax Cup: Tournament of J '97 Lightweight Tournament	December 20, 1997	1	1:10	Japan	
Loss	0–3	Takenori Ito	Decision (majority)	Shooto: Reconquista 4	October 12, 1997	2	5:00	Tokyo, Japan	
Loss	0–2	Takuya Kuwabara	Decision (majority)	Shooto: Free Fight Kawasaki	July 28, 1996	3	3:00	Kawasaki, Kanagawa, Japan	
Loss	0–1	Jutaro Nakao	Submission (rear-naked choke)	Shooto: Vale Tudo Junction 2	March 5, 1996	2	1:42	Tokyo, Japan	

== See also ==
- List of male mixed martial artists
