= Caol Uno =

Japanese mixed martial artist

- Born: May 8, 1975 (age 51); Yokosuka, Kanagawa, Japan
- Nationality: Japanese
- Height: 5 ft 7 in (1.70 m)
- Weight: 145 lb (66 kg; 10.4 st)
- Division: Featherweight; Lightweight
- Reach: 70 in (180 cm)
- Stance: Southpaw
- Fighting out of: Tokyo, Japan
- Team: Uno Dojo; Wajitsu Keishukai
- Teachers: Rumina Sato; Yoshinori Nishi
- Rank: A-Class Shootist; Black Belt in Wajutsu; Black Belt in Brazilian Jiu-Jitsu
- Years active: 1996–present

Mixed martial arts record
- Total: 64
- Wins: 35
- By knockout: 3
- By submission: 18
- By decision: 14
- Losses: 24
- By knockout: 9
- By submission: 3
- By decision: 12
- Draws: 5

Other information
- Mixed martial arts record from Sherdog

Caol Uno
Medal record

Men's Grappling

Representing Japan

ADCC World Championship
Silver medal – second place	1999 Abu Dhabi	-77kg

Kaoru "Caol" Uno (宇野薫, Uno Kaoru) (born May 8, 1975) is a Japanese mixed martial artist and professional wrestler. He is the Co-Champion of the UFC 41 Lightweight Tournament and a former Shooto Lightweight Champion.

As one of the early Ultimate Fighting Championship's elite Lightweight competitors, Uno competed for the UFC Lightweight Championship on two occasions. Despite falling short in both championship bouts; losing a five-round decision against Jens Pulver at UFC 30, to determine the inaugural UFC Lightweight Champion as well as a draw against B.J. Penn at UFC 41 (in a bout which would have determined the new UFC Lightweight Champion and UFC 41 Lightweight Tournament Winner), Uno is acknowledged as a pioneer for his impact and influence during the early era of the UFC Lightweight Division.

In addition, Uno is a skilled submission grappler and won a silver medal on the 1999 ADCC Submission Fighting World Championship -77 kg category.

Caol Uno also was a professional wrestler, having wrestled at Inoki Bom-Ba-Ye 2000 and at All Japan Pro Wrestling (AJPW) from 2002 to 2003.

== Mixed martial arts career ==
=== Early career ===
Uno finished second in the All Japan amateur Shooto tournament in 1996. He was a runner-up in the submission wrestling world championships at ADCC losing in the finals to world-renowned Jean Jacques Machado.

=== Shooto ===
Uno rose through the ranks of the Shooto mixed martial arts organization in Japan. In May 1999, Uno fought the then-legendary Rumina Sato. The fight was hailed as "Fight of the Year", an extremely fast-paced back and forth battle with a wide variety of stand-up and grappling exchanges. Eventually, Uno took the back of Sato and choked him into submission.

The two rematched in December 2000. This fight concluded with Uno standing over Sato on his back, then striking him with a knee and a punch while he was getting up, knocking him out.

=== UFC ===
After his second victory over Rumina Sato, Uno was recruited to fight for the UFC's Bantamweight (later renamed Lightweight) title against Jens Pulver. Throughout the fight, Pulver stopped Uno's takedown attempts and pressed the action on the feet. Uno, who had earned a reputation as being "unflappable", began to show frustration for the first time in his career as Pulver neutralized all his offensive efforts. Pulver took a majority decision win in the fight.

After Pulver left the UFC, the Lightweight Championship was vacated. A tournament was put together pitting the top Lightweights in the UFC (B.J. Penn, Din Thomas, Matt Serra and Caol Uno). In the first round, Uno faced Thomas. Thomas dominated the first round, setting a high pace. However, Uno turned things around, taking the second and third rounds to win the fight.

In the finals of the tournament, Uno faced Penn (who had previously defeated Uno by knockout in under 12 seconds). Uno used angles and effective wrestling techniques to frustrate Penn, who appeared tentative from the start, while Penn was dominant in spurts. The fight was called a draw and neither fighter won the championship belt.

=== Return to Japan ===
Uno then went on to fight Tatsuya Kawajiri in Shooto before fighting at K-1's 2004 Premium Dynamite!! and K-1 MAX: Japan Grand Prix 2005. His next eleven fights were for the then newly established promotion Hero's.

Uno next competed in DREAM's Lightweight Grand Prix. He was seeded directly into the second round, DREAM 3, where he beat Mitsuhiro Ishida via rear-naked choke submission to progress to the Dream 5: Lightweight Grand Prix 2008 Final Round. At Dream 5, Uno lost a unanimous decision to Shinya Aoki.

=== UFC return ===
Uno was spotted in attendance at UFC 94, fueling talk of a return to the UFC's Lightweight division. It was later confirmed that Uno had signed with the UFC and would face Spencer Fisher at UFC 99: The Comeback. In spite of finishing the bout pounding Fisher with punches from top crucifix position, Uno lost by a controversial unanimous decision. Then, on November 21, 2009, Uno fought UFC newcomer Fabrício Camões to a majority draw at UFC 106.

On March 31, 2010, Uno fought Gleison Tibau at UFC Fight Night 21. He was overpowered by the much bigger Tibau, and suffered a loss via TKO (punches). After the fight he was released from the promotion.

=== Post-UFC career ===
After parting ways with the UFC, the fighter's trajectory in the Japanese MMA circuit was marked by a diverse range of outcomes. Following his featherweight debut in Dynamite!! 2010, where he faced a unanimous decision loss against Kazuyuki Miyata, he rebounded with a victory over Akiyo Nishiura at Dream: Fight for Japan! in May 2011. However, a notable setback occurred in September 2011 when he suffered a knockout defeat due to a head kick from Takeshi Inoue at DREAM 17.

Undeterred, he demonstrated resilience in subsequent matches, securing wins via submission over opponents such as Kyu Hwa Kim, Anthony Avila, and Daniel Romero in 2013. The trend continued with victories against Jesse Brock, Taiki Tsuchiya, and Raja Shippen in 2014. Despite facing challenges and a decision loss to Yoshifumi Nakamura in January 2015, he rebounded with a submission win against Jung Ho Hwang in April 2016.

The fighter continued to navigate the competitive landscape, experiencing both victories and defeats. Notable moments include a submission win over Markus Held in November 2019 and a KO loss to Taison Naito in May 2021. The journey reached its recent chapter with decision losses to Akira Haraguchi in November 2021 and a knockout defeat to Shota Takagi at Shooto 2023 Vol.7 in November 2023.

== Professional wrestling career ==
Uno debuted in professional wrestling in December 2000 as part of the Inoki Bom-Ba-Ye event. He teamed up with Akira Shoji against The Great Sasuke and Daijiro Matsui, but his team lost when Sasuke pinned him.

=== All Japan Pro Wrestling (2002–2003) ===
Uno then signed up with All Japan Pro Wrestling in June 2002, where he debuted as a partner for Kendo Kashin against Kaz Hayashi and Kashin's double Mr. Problem (played again by Matsui), albeit in another losing effort. In November, he became also part of the event Wrestle-1, co-promoted with K-1. Coming under a monkey mask (which he quickly lost) and the name "The Apeman Nigo", Uno teamed up with Kashin to defeat La Parka and Super Parka.

He returned to AJPW in May 2003 under his Apeman Nigo persona. He and Kaz Hayashi lost to Kashin and Low Ki, but at the next event he teamed up with Ki to beat Gran Naniwa and Ryuji Hijikata. At the next day, he competed under his true name with Keiji Mutoh, winning over 728% Machine and The Apeman 200%, and then recovered his Nigo mask to team with Mutoh and Taka Michinoku in a winning effort against The Great Sasuke, The Great Kosuke and The Apeman. Uno's last appearance for AJPW would be in July, allying with Kashin and Robbie Brookside to beat Hayashi, Jimmy Yang and Ebessan.

== Championships and accomplishments ==
=== Mixed martial arts ===
- All Japan Amateur Shooto
  - All Japan Amateur Shooto Tournament Runner-up (1996)
- Ultimate Fighting Championship
  - UFC 41 Lightweight Tournament Co-Champion (drew with B.J. Penn in the finale)
- Shooto
  - Shooto Lightweight Championship (One Time)
  - One successful title defense vs. Rumina Sato
- K-1 Hero's
  - 2007 K-1 HERO'S Lightweight Tournament Semifinalist
  - 2006 K-1 HERO'S Lightweight Tournament Runner Up
  - 2005 K-1 HERO'S Lightweight Tournament Semifinalist
- DREAM
  - 2008 DREAM Lightweight Grand Prix Semifinalist

=== Submission wrestling ===
- ADCC Submission Wrestling World Championship
  - ADCC Submission Wrestling World Championship Silver Medalist 66k-76k (1999)

== Mixed martial arts record ==
Professional record breakdown
64 matches	35 wins	24 losses
By knockout	3	9
By submission	18	3
By decision	14	12
Draws	5	

Res.	Record	Opponent	Method	Event	Date	Round	Time	Location	Notes
Loss	35–24–5	Yoshihiro Koyama	Decision (unanimous)	Lemino Shooto Vol.7	July 13, 2026	3	5:00	Tokyo, Japan	
Win	35–23–5	Akihiko Mori	Decision (unanimous)	Shooto Torao 37	December 7, 2025	3	5:00	Yamaguchi, Japan	Catchweight (150 lb) bout.
Loss	34–23–5	Shota Takagi	KO (knee and punches)	Shooto 2023 Vol.7	November 19, 2023	2	0:56	Tokyo, Japan	
Loss	34–22–5	Akira Haraguchi	Decision (unanimous)	Vale Tudo Japan 2021	November 6, 2021	3	5:00	Tokyo, Japan	
Loss	34–21–5	Taison Naito	KO (punch)	Shooto 2021 Vol. 3	May 16, 2021	2	4:59	Tokyo, Japan	
Win	34–20–5	Markus Held	Submission (rear-naked choke)	Shooto: 30th Anniversary Tour 8th Round	November 24, 2019	2	1:56	Tokyo, Japan	
Loss	33–20–5	Duane van Helvoirt	Decision (unanimous)	Shooto: 30th Anniversary Tour 3rd and 4th Round	May 6, 2019	3	5:00	Tokyo, Japan	
Loss	33–19–5	Yutaka Saito	Decision (unanimous)	Shooto 4/23	April 23, 2017	5	5:00	Urayasu, Japan	For the Shooto Featherweight Championship.
Win	33–18–5	Hwang Jung-ho	Submission (rear-naked choke)	Shooto-Mobstyles Presents: Fight and Mosh	April 23, 2016	2	0:31	Urayasu, Japan	
Loss	32–18–5	Shigeki Osawa	TKO (punches)	Shooto 7/26	July 26, 2015	2	4:03	Tokyo, Japan	
Loss	32–17–5	Yoshifumi Nakamura	Decision (unanimous)	Shooto: 1st Round 2015	January 25, 2015	3	5:00	Tokyo, Japan	For the vacant Shooto Pacific Rim Lightweight Championship (145 lb).
Win	32–16–5	Raja Shippen	Submission (rear-naked choke)	Vale Tudo Japan 6th	October 4, 2014	2	4:33	Tokyo, Japan	
Win	31–16–5	Taiki Tsuchiya	Decision (unanimous)	Shooto: 4th Round 2014	May 5, 2014	3	5:00	Tokyo, Japan	
Win	30–16–5	Jesse Brock	Decision (unanimous)	Vale Tudo Japan 4th	February 23, 2014	3	5:00	Tokyo, Japan	
Win	29–16–5	Daniel Romero	Submission (inverted triangle choke)	Vale Tudo Japan 3rd	October 5, 2013	2	2:23	Tokyo, Japan	
Win	28–16–5	Anthony Avila	Submission (rear-naked choke)	Vale Tudo Japan 2nd	June 22, 2013	3	1:53	Tokyo, Japan	
Win	27–16–5	Kim Kyu-hwa	Submission (rear-naked choke)	Shooto: 2nd Round 2013	March 16, 2013	1	4:10	Tokyo, Japan	
Loss	26–16–5	Shintaro Ishiwatari	Decision (unanimous)	Shooto: 10th Round	September 30, 2012	3	5:00	Tokyo, Japan	Lightweight bout.
Loss	26–15–5	Takeshi Inoue	KO (head kick)	Dream 17	September 24, 2011	1	4:17	Saitama, Japan	
Win	26–14–5	Akiyo Nishiura	Decision (unanimous)	Dream: Fight For Japan!	May 29, 2011	2	5:00	Saitama, Japan	
Loss	25–14–5	Kazuyuki Miyata	Decision (unanimous)	Dynamite!! 2010	December 31, 2010	3	5:00	Saitama, Japan	Featherweight debut.
Loss	25–13–5	Gleison Tibau	TKO (punches)	UFC Fight Night: Florian vs. Gomi	March 31, 2010	1	4:13	Charlotte, North Carolina, United States	
Draw	25–12–5	Fabrício Camões	Draw (majority)	UFC 106	November 21, 2009	3	5:00	Las Vegas, Nevada, United States	
Loss	25–12–4	Spencer Fisher	Decision (unanimous)	UFC 99	June 13, 2009	3	5:00	Cologne, Germany	
Loss	25–11–4	Shinya Aoki	Decision (unanimous)	Dream 5	July 21, 2008	2	5:00	Osaka, Japan	2008 Dream Lightweight Grand Prix Semifinal.
Win	25–10–4	Mitsuhiro Ishida	Submission (rear-naked choke)	Dream 3	May 11, 2008	2	1:39	Saitama, Japan	2008 Dream Lightweight Grand Prix Quarterfinal.
Loss	24–10–4	Andre Amade	Decision (unanimous)	Hero's 10	September 17, 2007	3	5:00	Yokohama, Japan	2007 Hero's Lightweight Grand Prix Semifinal.
Win	24–9–4	Katsuhiko Nagata	Decision (unanimous)	Hero's 9	July 16, 2007	3	5:00	Yokohama, Japan	2007 Hero's Lightweight Grand Prix Quarterfinal.
Win	23–9–4	Ali Abdelaziz	Submission (armbar)	Hero's 8	March 12, 2007	1	1:58	Nagoya, Japan	
Loss	22–9–4	Gesias Cavalcante	Decision (majority)	Hero's 7	October 9, 2006	2	5:00	Yokohama, Japan	2006 Hero's Lightweight Grand Prix Final.
Win	22–8–4	Ivan Menjivar	Decision (unanimous)	Hero's 7	October 9, 2006	2	5:00	Yokohama, Japan	2006 Hero's Lightweight Grand Prix Semifinal.
Win	21–8–4	Kultar Gill	Submission (rear-naked choke)	Hero's 6	August 5, 2006	2	3:30	Tokyo, Japan	2006 Hero's Lightweight Grand Prix Quarterfinal.
Win	20–8–4	Ole Laursen	Submission (rear-naked choke)	Hero's 5	May 3, 2006	2	4:36	Tokyo, Japan	2006 Hero's Lightweight Grand Prix Opening Round.
Win	19–8–4	Rich Clementi	Decision (unanimous)	Hero's 4	March 15, 2006	2	5:00	Tokyo, Japan	
Loss	18–8–4	Norifumi Yamamoto	TKO (doctor stoppage)	Hero's 3	September 7, 2005	2	4:04	Tokyo, Japan	2005 Hero's Lightweight Grand Prix Semifinal.
Win	18–7–4	Hideo Tokoro	Decision (unanimous)	Hero's 3	September 7, 2005	2	5:00	Tokyo, Japan	2005 Hero's Lightweight Grand Prix Quarterfinal.
Loss	17–7–4	Joachim Hansen	KO (knee)	Hero's 1	March 26, 2005	3	4:48	Saitama, Japan	
Win	17–6–4	Serkan Yılmaz	Submission (armbar)	K-1 MAX: Japan Grand Prix 2005	February 23, 2005	1	1:59	Tokyo, Japan	
Win	16–6–4	Chandet Sorpantrey	Submission (rear-naked choke)	K-1 Premium 2004 Dynamite!!	December 31, 2004	2	0:19	Osaka, Japan	
Draw	15–6–4	Tatsuya Kawajiri	Draw (majority)	Shooto: 3/22 in Korakuen Hall	March 22, 2004	3	5:00	Tokyo, Japan	
Loss	15–6–3	Hermes França	KO (punch)	UFC 44	September 26, 2003	2	2:46	Las Vegas, Nevada, United States	
Draw	15–5–3	B.J. Penn	Draw (split)	UFC 41	February 28, 2003	5	5:00	Atlantic City, New Jersey, United States	UFC Lightweight Tournament Final. For the vacant UFC Lightweight Championship.
Win	15–5–2	Din Thomas	Decision (unanimous)	UFC 39	September 27, 2002	3	5:00	Uncasville, Connecticut, United States	UFC Lightweight Tournament Semifinal.
Win	14–5–2	Yves Edwards	Decision (unanimous)	UFC 37	May 10, 2002	3	5:00	Bossier City, Louisiana, United States	
Loss	13–5–2	B.J. Penn	KO (punches)	UFC 34	November 2, 2001	1	0:11	Las Vegas, Nevada, United States	UFC Lightweight title eliminator.
Win	13–4–2	Fabiano Iha	TKO (punches)	UFC 32	June 29, 2001	1	1:48	East Rutherford, New Jersey, United States	
Loss	12–4–2	Jens Pulver	Decision (unanimous)	UFC 30	February 23, 2001	5	5:00	Atlantic City, New Jersey, United States	For the inaugural UFC Lightweight Championship.
Win	12–3–2	Rumina Sato	KO (punch)	Shooto: R.E.A.D. Final	December 17, 2000	1	2:21	Urayasu, Japan	Defended the Shooto Lightweight Championship.
Loss	11–3–2	Marcio Ramos Barbosa	Technical Submission (guillotine choke)	Shooto: R.E.A.D. 9	August 27, 2000	3	1:49	Yokohama, Japan	
Win	11–2–2	Dennis Hallman	Decision (unanimous)	Shooto: R.E.A.D. 3	April 2, 2000	3	5:00	Osaka, Japan	
Draw	10–2–2	André Pederneiras	Draw	Vale Tudo Japan 1999	December 11, 1999	3	8:00	Tokyo, Japan	
Win	10–2–1	Din Thomas	Submission (rear-naked choke)	Shooto: Renaxis 4	September 5, 1999	3	3:16	Tokyo, Japan	
Win	9–2–1	Rumina Sato	Submission (rear-naked choke)	Shooto: 10th Anniversary Event	May 29, 1999	3	4:02	Yokohama, Japan	Won the vacant Shooto Lightweight Championship.
Win	8–2–1	Ricardo Botelho	TKO (submission to punches)	Vale Tudo Japan 1998	October 25, 1998	3	2:03	Tokyo, Japan	
Win	7–2–1	Zvonko Jakovcevic	Submission (triangle choke)	Shooto: Las Grandes Viajes 4	July 29, 1998	1	3:15	Tokyo, Japan	
Win	6–2–1	Ian James Schaffa	Technical Submission (armbar)	Shooto: Las Grandes Viajes 3	May 13, 1998	3	3:13	Tokyo, Japan	
Win	5–2–1	Yuji Fujita	Decision (unanimous)	Shooto: Las Grandes Viajes 2	March 1, 1998	2	5:00	Tokyo, Japan	
Loss	4–2–1	Naoya Uematsu	Submission (Achilles lock)	Lumax Cup: Tournament of J '97 Lightweight Tournament	December 20, 1997	1	0:23	Tokyo, Japan	Lumax Cup Lightweight Tournament Final.
Win	4–1–1	Hiroki Kotani	Decision (unanimous)	Lumax Cup: Tournament of J '97 Lightweight Tournament	December 20, 1997	2	3:00	Tokyo, Japan	Lumax Cup Lightweight Tournament Semifinal.
Win	3–1–1	Masahito Wachi	Decision (unanimous)	Lumax Cup: Tournament of J '97 Lightweight Tournament	December 20, 1997	2	3:00	Tokyo, Japan	Lumax Cup Lightweight Tournament Quarterfinal.
Draw	2–1–1	Takuya Kuwabara	Draw (split)	Shooto: Reconquista 4	October 12, 1997	2	5:00	Tokyo, Japan	
Win	2–1	Yuzo Tateishi	Submission (rear-naked choke)	Shooto: Gig	June 25, 1997	1	2:14	Tokyo, Japan	Lightweight debut.
Win	1–1	Patrick Tapels	Submission (rear-naked choke)	Japan Extreme Challenge Vale Tudo Open	May 28, 1997	1	2:20	Tokyo, Japan	
Loss	0–1	Hayato Sakurai	Submission (armbar)	Shooto: Let's Get Lost	October 4, 1996	1	2:52	Tokyo, Japan	Welterweight debut.

== Submission grappling record ==
KO PUNCHES

Result	Opponent	Method	Event	Date	Round	Time	Notes
Win	(England) Leigh Remedios	Submission (straight armlock)	Polaris 10	May 25, 2019	1	5:10	
Loss	(Brazil) Marcos de Souza	Submission (armbar)	Quintet	April 11, 2018	1		
Loss	(Brazil) Fredson Paixao	Submission (armbar)	UFC Fan Expo	2010	2	3:15	
Win	(United States) Javier Vazquez	Decision	CAND	2004	3		
Loss	(Japan) Minoru Suzuki and (Japan) Tsuyoshi Kohsaka	Submission	The Contenders X-Rage Vol.2	October 3, 2002	1	14:39	Partnered with (Japan) Osami Shibuya
Draw	(Japan) Minoru Suzuki and (Japan) Takafumi Ito	Draw	The Contenders 5 Prospective M-1	October 6, 2001	1	10:00	Partnered with (Japan) Daiju Takase
Loss	(Brazil) Fernando Vasconcelos	Points	ADCC 2001 Absolute	2001			
Loss	(Japan) Takanori Gomi	Decision	The CONTENDERS 6	October 8, 2001	3		
Win	(Japan) Yasushi Miyake	Decision	The CONTENDERS 4	2000			
Loss	(Japan) Genki Sudo	Decision	The CONTENDERS 2000	2000	2		
Loss	(Brazil) Marcio Feitosa Souza	Points	ADCC 2000 –77 kg	2000	1		
Loss	(Brazil) Jean-Jacques Machado	Submission (rear naked choke)	ADCC 1999 –77 kg	1999	1	4:45	
Win	(Brazil) Eddie Ruiz	Submission	ADCC 1999 –77 kg	1999	1	6:00	
Win	(Brazil) Pedro Duarte	Decision	ADCC 1999 –77 kg	1999	3	20:00	
Win	(United States) John Lewis	Submission (rear naked choke)	ADCC 1999 –77 kg	1999	1	8:05	
Draw	(Japan) Yasushi Miyake	-	The CONTENDERS 1	1999	3		

== See also ==
- List of male mixed martial artists
- List of Shooto champions
- List of Brazilian jiu-jitsu practitioners
