= Luiz Azeredo =

Brazilian mixed martial arts fighter

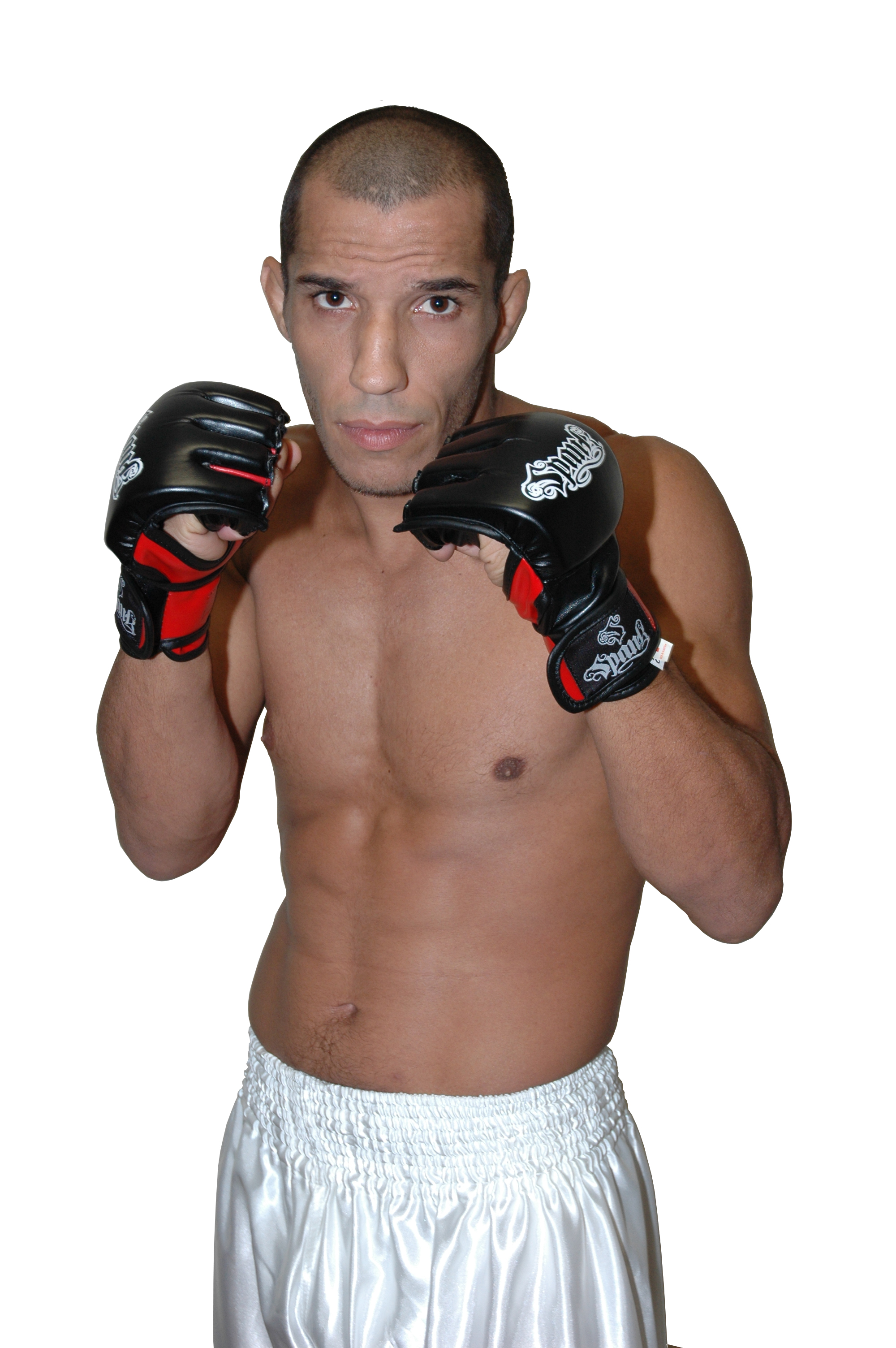
- Born: 10 June 1976 (age 50); São Paulo, Brazil
- Other names: The Joker
- Height: 1.77 m (5 ft 10 in)
- Weight: 71 kg (157 lb; 11.2 st)
- Division: Middleweight; Welterweight; Lightweight
- Style: MMA, Brazilian jiu-jitsu, Submission wrestling, Kickboxing
- Fighting out of: Curitiba, Brazil
- Team: Chute Boxe Academy; Brazilian Top Team
- Trainer: Rudimar Fedrigo
- Years active: 1997–2011

Kickboxing record
- Total: 2
- Wins: 1
- Losses: 1

Mixed martial arts record
- Total: 25
- Wins: 15
- By knockout: 8
- By submission: 1
- By decision: 6
- Losses: 10
- By knockout: 3
- By submission: 1
- By decision: 6

Other information
- Notable students: Oluwale Bamgbose
- Mixed martial arts record from Sherdog

Luiz Azeredo (born 10 June 1976) is a Brazilian retired mixed martial artist. He fought in the PRIDE Fighting Championships and Cage Rage.

== Mixed martial arts career ==
On 22 November 2008 he participated in Shoot Boxing World Tournament 2008, where he reached the semi-finals and was defeated by defending champion Kenichi Ogata. He is most notable for being the first person to defeat Anderson Silva in an MMA bout.

=== Bellator ===
Azeredo made his Bellator debut at Bellator 33 winning against formerly undefeated, Edward Guedes. He won the fight after dominating all three rounds, as he got the unanimous decision win. With the win, Azeredo was offered a spot in the Season 4 lightweight tournament and lost to Renê Nazare.

== Mixed martial arts record ==
Professional record breakdown
25 matches	15 wins	10 losses
By knockout	8	3
By submission	1	1
By decision	6	6

Res.	Record	Opponent	Method	Event	Date	Round	Time	Location	Notes
Loss	15–10	Renê Nazare	TKO (arm injury)	Bellator 39	2 April 2011	1	5:00	Uncasville, Connecticut, United States	Catchweight (160 lb) bout.
Win	15–9	Edward Guedes	Decision (unanimous)	Bellator 33	21 October 2010	3	5:00	Philadelphia, Pennsylvania, United States	Catchweight (159 lb) bout.
Win	14–9	Niko Puhakka	Decision (unanimous)	Fight Festival 28	16 October 2010	3	5:00	Helsinki, Finland	
Loss	13–9	Mikhail Malyutin	Decision (unanimous)	Ring of Combat 31	24 September 2010	3	5:00	Atlantic City, New Jersey, United States	For the vacant ROC Lightweight Championship.
Win	13–8	Brandon Adamson	Submission (rear-naked choke)	Universal Combat 3	10 September 2010	1	3:06	Jersey City, New Jersey, United States	
Loss	12–8	Ronys Torres	Submission (kimura)	Jungle Fight 10	12 July 2008	1	4:34	Rio de Janeiro, Brazil	
Win	12–7	Milton Vieira	Decision (unanimous)	The One: VIP Fighting	13 February 2008	3	5:00	São Paulo, Brazil	
Loss	11–7	Tatsuya Kawajiri	Decision (unanimous)	Yarennoka!	31 December 2007	2	5:00	Saitama, Japan	
Win	11–6	Paul Daley	Decision (unanimous)	Cage Rage 19	9 December 2006	3	5:00	London, England	
Loss	10–6	Joachim Hansen	KO (knee)	Pride Bushido 10	2 April 2006	1	7:09	Tokyo, Japan	
Loss	10–5	Takanori Gomi	Decision (unanimous)	PRIDE Bushido 9	25 September 2005	2	5:00	Tokyo, Japan	2005 Pride Lightweight Grand Prix Semifinal.
Win	10–4	Naoyuki Kotani	KO (knees and punches)	Pride Bushido 9	25 September 2005	1	0:11	Tokyo, Japan	2005 Pride Lightweight Grand Prix Quarterfinal.
Loss	9–4	Takanori Gomi	KO (punches)	Pride Bushido 7	22 May 2005	1	3:46	Tokyo, Japan	Catchweight (170 lb) bout; Azeredo missed weight.
Win	9–3	Luiz Firmino	Decision (split)	Pride Bushido 6	3 April 2005	2	5:00	Yokohama, Japan	
Win	8–3	Regiclaudio Alves Macedo	TKO (punches)	Storm Samurai 5	5 November 2004	2	2:23	Curitiba, Brazil	
Win	7–3	Eduardo Simões	TKO (punches and stomp)	Storm Samurai 4	7 August 2004	1	1:36	Curitiba, Brazil	Return to Lightweight.
Loss	6–3	Tony DeSouza	Decision (unanimous)	Meca World Vale Tudo 11	5 June 2004	3	5:00	Rio de Janeiro, Brazil	
Win	6–2	Rodrigo Ruas	TKO (punches)	Brazil Super Fight 1	19 September 2003	1	1:26	Porto Alegre, Brazil	Return to Welterweight.
Win	5–2	Cristiano Marcello	TKO (knees)	Meca World Vale Tudo 6	31 January 2002	1	8:30	Curitiba, Brazil	Lightweight debut.
Win	4–2	Fabrício Camões	TKO (retirement)	Meca World Vale Tudo 3	14 November 2000	2	1:36	Curitiba, Brazil	Middleweight debut.
Loss	3–2	Hayato Sakurai	Decision (unanimous)	Shooto: R.E.A.D. 8	4 August 2000	3	5:00	Osaka, Japan	
Win	3–1	Anderson Silva	Decision (unanimous)	Meca World Vale Tudo 1	27 May 2000	2	10:00	Curitiba, Brazil	
Loss	2–1	Antonio Duarte	Decision	Brazil Free Style: The Best Fighters	14 May 1997	1	10:00	Brazil	
Win	2–0	Allen Clanton	TKO (submission to strikes)	Brazil Free Style: The Best Fighters	14 May 1997	1	5:18	Brazil	
Win	1–0	Alexandre Alexandre	TKO (submission to elbows)	Brazil Free Style: The Best Fighters	14 May 1997	1	1:52	Brazil	Welterweight debut.

== See also ==
- List of male mixed martial artists
- List of Pride Fighting events
