= Yuzo Tateishi =

Japanese mixed martial artist

- Born: Japan
- Nationality: Japanese
- Years active: 1996–1997

Mixed martial arts record
- Total: 5
- Wins: 1
- By decision: 1
- Losses: 4
- By submission: 3
- By decision: 1

Other information
- Mixed martial arts record from Sherdog

Yuzo Tateishi is a Japanese mixed martial artist.

== Mixed martial arts record ==
Professional record breakdown
5 matches	1 win	4 losses
By submission	0	3
By decision	1	1

Res.	Record	Opponent	Method	Event	Date	Round	Time	Location	Notes
Loss	1–4	Caol Uno	Submission (rear-naked choke)	Shooto: Gig	June 25, 1997	1	2:14	Tokyo, Japan	
Loss	1–3	Hiroyuki Kojima	Submission (kimura)	Shooto: Let's Get Lost	October 4, 1996	1	3:00	Tokyo, Japan	
Loss	1–2	Yuji Fujita	Decision (unanimous)	Shooto: Free Fight Kawasaki	July 28, 1996	3	3:00	Kawasaki, Kanagawa, Japan	
Loss	1–1	Masanori Suda	Submission (armbar)	Lumax Cup: Tournament of J '96	March 30, 1996	1	1:51	Japan	
Win	1–0	Ikuhisa Minowa	Decision	Lumax Cup: Tournament of J '96	March 30, 1996	2	3:00	Japan	

== See also ==
- List of male mixed martial artists
