= Takuya Kuwabara =

Japanese mixed martial artist

Takuya Kuwabara 桑原卓也
- Born: Japan
- Nationality: Japanese
- Height: 5 ft 2 in (1.57 m)
- Weight: 154 lb (70 kg; 11.0 st)
- Division: Lightweight
- Style: Judo, Boxing
- Team: Purebred Omiya
- Years active: 1993 - 2000

Mixed martial arts record
- Total: 15
- Wins: 8
- By knockout: 1
- By submission: 2
- By decision: 5
- Losses: 3
- By decision: 3
- Draws: 4

Other information
- Mixed martial arts record from Sherdog

Takuya Kuwabara Japanese: 桑原卓也 is a Japanese mixed martial artist. He competed in the Lightweight division.

== Mixed martial arts record ==
Professional record breakdown
15 matches	8 wins	3 losses
By knockout	1	0
By submission	2	0
By decision	5	3
Draws	4	

Res.	Record	Opponent	Method	Event	Date	Round	Time	Location	Notes
Loss	8–3–4	Rumina Sato	Technical Decision (unanimous)	Shooto - R.E.A.D. 9	August 27, 2000	2	5:00	Yokohama, Kanagawa, Japan	
Draw	8–2–4	Ian James Schaffa	Draw	Shooto - R.E.A.D. 5	May 22, 2000	3	5:00		
Win	8–2–3	Johnny Eduardo	Decision (unanimous)	Shooto - R.E.A.D. 2	March 17, 2000	3	5:00	Tokyo, Japan	
Loss	7–2–3	Takanori Gomi	Decision (unanimous)	Shooto - Renaxis 4	September 5, 1999	3	5:00	Tokyo, Japan	
Win	7–1–3	John Paun	TKO (punches)	Shooto - Renaxis 2	July 16, 1999	2	2:09	Tokyo, Japan	
Loss	6–1–3	Takanori Gomi	Decision (unanimous)	Shooto - Renaxis 1	March 28, 1999	3	5:00	Tokyo, Japan	
Win	6–0–3	Damien Riccio	Decision (unanimous)	Shooto - Las Grandes Viajes 4	July 29, 1998	3	5:00	Tokyo, Japan	
Win	5–0–3	Takenori Ito	Decision (majority)	Shooto - Gig '98 1st	April 10, 1998	3	5:00	Tokyo, Japan	
Draw	4–0–3	Caol Uno	Draw	Shooto - Reconquista 4	October 12, 1997	2	5:00	Tokyo, Japan	
Draw	4–0–2	Hayato Sakurai	Draw	Shooto - Reconquista 1	January 18, 1997	3	3:00	Tokyo, Japan	
Win	4–0–1	Naoto Kojima	Decision (majority)	Shooto - Free Fight Kawasaki	July 28, 1996	3	3:00	Kawasaki, Kanagawa, Japan	
Win	3–0–1	Masakazu Kuramochi	Decision (split)	Shooto - Vale Tudo Junction 3	May 7, 1996	3	3:00	Tokyo, Japan	
Win	2–0–1	Shinji Arano	Technical Submission (armbar)	Shooto - Vale Tudo Junction 2	March 5, 1996	2	1:42	Tokyo, Japan	
Win	1–0–1	Yuji Fujita	Technical Submission (armbar)	Shooto - Vale Tudo Junction 1	January 20, 1996	2	2:15	Tokyo, Japan	
Draw	0–0–1	Eiji Mizuno	Draw	Shooto - Shooto	November 25, 1993	4	3:00	Tokyo, Japan	

== See also ==
- List of male mixed martial artists
