= Yasunori Okuda =

Japanese mixed martial arts fighter

Yasunori Okuda 奥田靖典
- Born: August 21, 1972 (age 54); Japan
- Nationality: Japanese
- Height: 6 ft 0 in (1.83 m)
- Weight: 185 lb (84 kg; 13.2 st)
- Division: Middleweight
- Years active: 1993 - 1996

Mixed martial arts record
- Total: 8
- Wins: 2
- By submission: 2
- Losses: 6
- By knockout: 2
- By submission: 4

Other information
- Mixed martial arts record from Sherdog

Yasunori Okuda Japanese: 奥田靖典 (born August 8, 1972) is a Japanese mixed martial artist. He competed in the Middleweight division.

== Mixed martial arts record ==
Professional record breakdown
8 matches	2 wins	6 losses
By knockout	0	2
By submission	2	4

Res.	Record	Opponent	Method	Event	Date	Round	Time	Location	Notes
Loss	2–6	Jutaro Nakao	TKO (punches)	Shooto - Vale Tudo Junction 1	January 20, 1996	1	1:18	Tokyo, Japan	
Loss	2–5	Erik Paulson	Technical Submission (keylock)	Shooto - Vale Tudo Perception	September 26, 1995	1	0:44	Setagaya, Tokyo, Japan	
Loss	2–4	Naoki Sakurada	Submission (heel hook)	Shooto - Vale Tudo Access 4	May 12, 1995	1	3:00	Japan	
Loss	2–3	Kenji Kawaguchi	Submission (guillotine choke)	Shooto - Shooto	May 6, 1994	1	2:55	Tokyo, Japan	
Loss	2–2	Kazuhiro Kusayanagi	Submission (armbar)	Lumax Cup - Tournament of J '94	April 23, 1994	1	1:01	Japan	
Win	2–1	Akihiro Gono	Submission (toe hold)	Lumax Cup - Tournament of J '94	April 23, 1994	1	1:51	Japan	
Win	1–1	Yuji Fujita	Submission (armbar)	Shooto - Shooto	March 18, 1994	1	0:25	Tokyo, Japan	
Loss	0–1	Yuji Ito	TKO (retirement)	Shooto - Shooto	November 25, 1993	2	3:00	Tokyo, Japan	

== See also ==
- List of male mixed martial artists
