= 1995 in Shooto =

Mixed martial arts events

Information
- First date: January 21, 1995
- Last date: November 7, 1995

Events
- Total events: 6

Fights
- Total fights: 30

Chronology
1994 in Shooto	1995 in Shooto	1996 in Shooto

The year 1995 is the 7th year in the history of Shooto, a mixed martial arts promotion based in the Japan. In 1995, Shooto held 6 events beginning with, Shooto: Vale Tudo Access 3.

== Events list ==
#	Event Title	Date	Arena	Location
37	Shooto: Tokyo Free Fight	November 7, 1995	Korakuen Hall	Tokyo, Japan
36	Shooto: Vale Tudo Perception	September 26, 1995	Komazawa Olympic Park Gymnasium	Setagaya, Tokyo, Japan
35	Shooto: Complete Vale Tudo Access	July 29, 1995	Omiya Skating Center	Omiya, Saitama, Japan
34	Shooto: Yokohama Free Fight	June 4, 1995		Japan
33	Shooto: Vale Tudo Access 4	May 12, 1995		Japan
32	Shooto: Vale Tudo Access 3	January 21, 1995	Korakuen Hall	Tokyo, Japan

== Shooto: Vale Tudo Access 3 ==
Shooto: Vale Tudo Access 3 was an event held on January 21, 1995, at Korakuen Hall in Tokyo, Japan.

=== Results ===
Main Card
Weight class				Method	Round	Time	Notes
	Naoki Sakurada	def.	Maurice Roumimper	Submission (Heel Hook)	2	1:10
	Kazuhiro Sakamoto	def.	Imre Hagendoorn	Submission (Armbar)	1	0:45
	Yuki Nakai	def.	Hiroaki Matsutani	Submission (Heel Hook)	1	0:20
	Kyuhei Ueno	def.	Kenichi Tanaka	Decision (Unanimous)	5	3:00
	Enson Inoue	def.	Shingo Shigeta	TKO (Punches)	1	1:10
	Mamoru Okochi	def.	Satoshi Fukuoka	Technical Submission (Triangle Choke)	1	1:02

== Shooto: Vale Tudo Access 4 ==
Shooto: Vale Tudo Access 4 was an event held on May 12, 1995, in Japan.

=== Results ===
Main Card
Weight class				Method	Round	Time	Notes
	Kazuhiro Sakamoto	def.	Rene Stigter	Submission (Armbar)	1	1:47
	Kyuhei Ueno	def.	Maurice Roumimper	Submission (Armbar)	1	1:42
	Naoki Sakurada	def.	Yasunori Okuda	Submission (Heel Hook)	1	3:00
	Kazuhiro Kusayanagi	def.	Yasushi Warita	Submission (Armbar)	1	1:53
	Masato Suzuki	def.	Yuji Hashiguchi	Submission (Kimura)	2	2:59
	Uchu Tatsumi	def.	Magnum Kawamura	Decision (Unanimous)	3	3:00
	Jin Akimoto	def.	Kazuyoshi Kudo	Submission (Rear Naked Choke)	1	0:56

== Shooto: Yokohama Free Fight ==
Shooto: Yokohama Free Fight was an event held on June 4, 1995, in Japan.

=== Results ===
Main Card
Weight class				Method	Round	Time	Notes
	Rumina Sato	def.	Katsuaki Yano	TKO (Punches)	1	2:23
	Jin Akimoto	def.	Masataka Kawakami	Submission (Rear Naked Choke)	1	2:32

== Shooto: Complete Vale Tudo Access ==
Shooto: Complete Vale Tudo Access was an event held on July 29, 1995, at The Omiya Skating Center in Omiya, Saitama, Japan.

=== Results ===
Main Card
Weight class				Method	Round	Time	Notes
	Erik Paulson	def.	Ben Spijkers	Submission (Guillotine Choke)	5	0:38
	Enson Inoue	def.	Ed de Kruijf	Technical Submission (Armbar)	1	1:40
	Noboru Asahi	def.	Leonid Zaslavsky	Submission (Heel Hook)	3	0:48
	Kyuhei Ueno	def.	Kazuhiro Kusayanagi	TKO (Punches)	5	1:17
	Carl Franks	vs.	Remco Pardoel	No Contest	1	8:00
	Rumina Sato	def.	Ron Balicki	Technical Submission (Armbar)	1	2:14
	Toshiyuki Wado	def.	Jonathan Eusebio	Technical Submission (Armbar)	2	1:33

== Shooto: Vale Tudo Perception ==
Shooto: Vale Tudo Perception was an event held on September 26, 1995, at Komazawa Olympic Park Gymnasium in Setagaya, Tokyo, Japan. Aside its MMA fights, it also featured an exhibition bout between Satoru Sayama and Kuniaki Kobayashi and a grappling match between Yuki Nakai and Jean-Jacques Machado.

=== Results ===
Main Card
Weight class				Method	Round	Time	Notes
	Noboru Asahi	def.	Anthony Lange	Submission (Armbar)	1	3:41
	Erik Paulson	def.	Yasunori Okuda	Technical Submission (Keylock)	1	0:44
	Kazuhiro Sakamoto	def.	Leonid Zaslavsky	Submission (Rear Naked Choke)	1	2:11
	Zane Frazier	def.	Kendo Nagasaki	KO (Punch)	1	0:36
	Rumina Sato	def.	Isamu Osugi	Technical Submission (Flying Reverse Triangle Choke)	1	2:01

== Shooto: Tokyo Free Fight ==
Shooto: Tokyo Free Fight was an event held on November 7, 1995, at Korakuen Hall in Tokyo, Japan.

=== Results ===
Main Card
Weight class				Method	Round	Time	Notes
	Kyuhei Ueno	def.	Toru Koga	TKO (Punches)	3	1:43
	Kimihito Nonaka	vs.	Masahiro Oishi	Draw	3	3:00
	Tomoaki Hayama	def.	Isamu Osugi	Submission (Guillotine Choke)	2	2:10

== See also ==
- Shooto
- List of Shooto champions
- List of Shooto Events
