= Toru Koga =

Japanese mixed martial artist

Toru Koga 古賀徹
- Born: Japan
- Nationality: Japanese
- Years active: 1995 - 1996

Mixed martial arts record
- Total: 3
- Wins: 0
- Losses: 3
- By knockout: 2
- By submission: 1

Other information
- Mixed martial arts record from Sherdog

Toru Koga Japanese: 古賀徹is a Japanese mixed martial artist.

== Mixed martial arts record ==
Professional record breakdown
3 matches	0 wins	3 losses
By knockout	0	2
By submission	0	1

Res.	Record	Opponent	Method	Event	Date	Round	Time	Location	Notes
Loss	0–3	Yasushi Warita	KO (head kick)	Shooto: Vale Tudo Junction 3	May 7, 1996	3	0:18	Tokyo, Japan	
Loss	0–2	Kazuhiro Kusayanagi	Submission (armbar)	Shooto: Vale Tudo Junction 2	March 5, 1996	4	2:14	Tokyo, Japan	
Loss	0–1	Kyuhei Ueno	TKO (punches)	Shooto: Tokyo Free Fight	November 7, 1995	3	1:43	Tokyo, Japan	

== See also ==
- List of male mixed martial artists
