= Yarennoka! =

M-1 MMA event in 2007

Yarennoka 2007
- The poster for Yarennoka 2007
- Promotion: Yarennoka Executive Committee (former Pride staff), M-1 Global, and Fighting and Entertainment Group
- Date: December 31, 2007
- Venue: Saitama Super Arena
- City: Saitama, Japan
- Attendance: 27,128

Yarennoka! (Japanese pronunciation: [jaɾennoka]) was a mixed martial arts (MMA) event that took place on December 31, 2007 at the Saitama Super Arena in Tokyo, Japan. The event was promoted by the Yarennoka! Executive Committee, composed of former Pride Fighting Championships executives, and held in association with Fighting and Entertainment Group, DEEP, and M-1 Global. The event aired on HDNet and was billed as "Fedor Returns" in the United States; while it was shown on SKY Perfect, a Japanese pay per view network.

It was headlined by a fight between former Pride heavyweight champion and 2004 heavyweight Grand Prix champion Fedor Emelianenko and K-1 2007 World Grand Prix Finalist Hong-man Choi. The undercard showcased many top lightweight fighters and was also marked by a marquee matchup of the Pride 2006 Welterweight Grand Prix Champion Kazuo Misaki and the Hero's 2006 Light Heavyweight Grand Prix Champion Yoshihiro Akiyama. The event was a farewell show to Pride fans after their acquisition by the Ultimate Fighting Championship in early 2007.

It is also credited for inspiring the former Pride executives and the Fighting and Entertainment Group to create the new fight series, Dream.

== Results ==
Main card
Weight class				Method	Round	Time	Notes
Lightweight	Shinya Aoki	def.	Bu-kyung Jung	Decision (unanimous)	2	5:00
Lightweight	Hayato Sakurai	def.	Hidehiko Hasegawa	Decision (unanimous)	2	5:00
Heavyweight	Fedor Emelianenko	def.	Hong-man Choi	Submission (armbar)	1	1:54
Middleweight	Kazuo Misaki	vs.	Yoshihiro Akiyama	No Contest	1	7:48	(Note: Misaki was originally declared the winner by knockout, but Akiyama's camp protested, claiming that it was an illegal soccer kick. The decision was later overturned to a No Contest.)
Lightweight	Mitsuhiro Ishida	def.	Gilbert Melendez	Decision (unanimous)	2	5:00
Middleweight	Makoto Takimoto	def.	Murilo Bustamante	Decision (split)	2	5:00
Lightweight	Tatsuya Kawajiri	def.	Luiz Azeredo	Decision (unanimous)	2	5:00
Heavyweight	Mike Russow	def.	Roman Zentsov	Submission (north-south choke)	1	2:58

== Notes ==
- A match between Shinya Aoki and Gesias Calvancante was postponed after Calvancante tore a ligament in his elbow while training with Brazilian Top Team. Bu-kyung Jung, a judo silver-medalist from Sydney Olympics who made his MMA debut in this event, was confirmed to be the new opponent of Aoki.
- Former Pride lightweight Joachim Hansen was originally slated to fight at Yarennoka! but was moved to the K-1 PREMIUM 2007 Dynamite!! show against Kazuyuki Miyata in return for the fighters K-1 sent over for Yarennoka.
- The knockout in the Misaki-Akiyama match was the result of a controversial head kick delivered as Akiyama was standing up from the mat after being previously knocked down by Misaki. Akiyama's camp later indicated that they believed the kick was an illegal soccer kick, since they claimed Akiyama was in the four points position at the time of the kick. The event's head referee Yuji Shimada indicated the timing was close but after a video review, the result was overturned and declared No contest

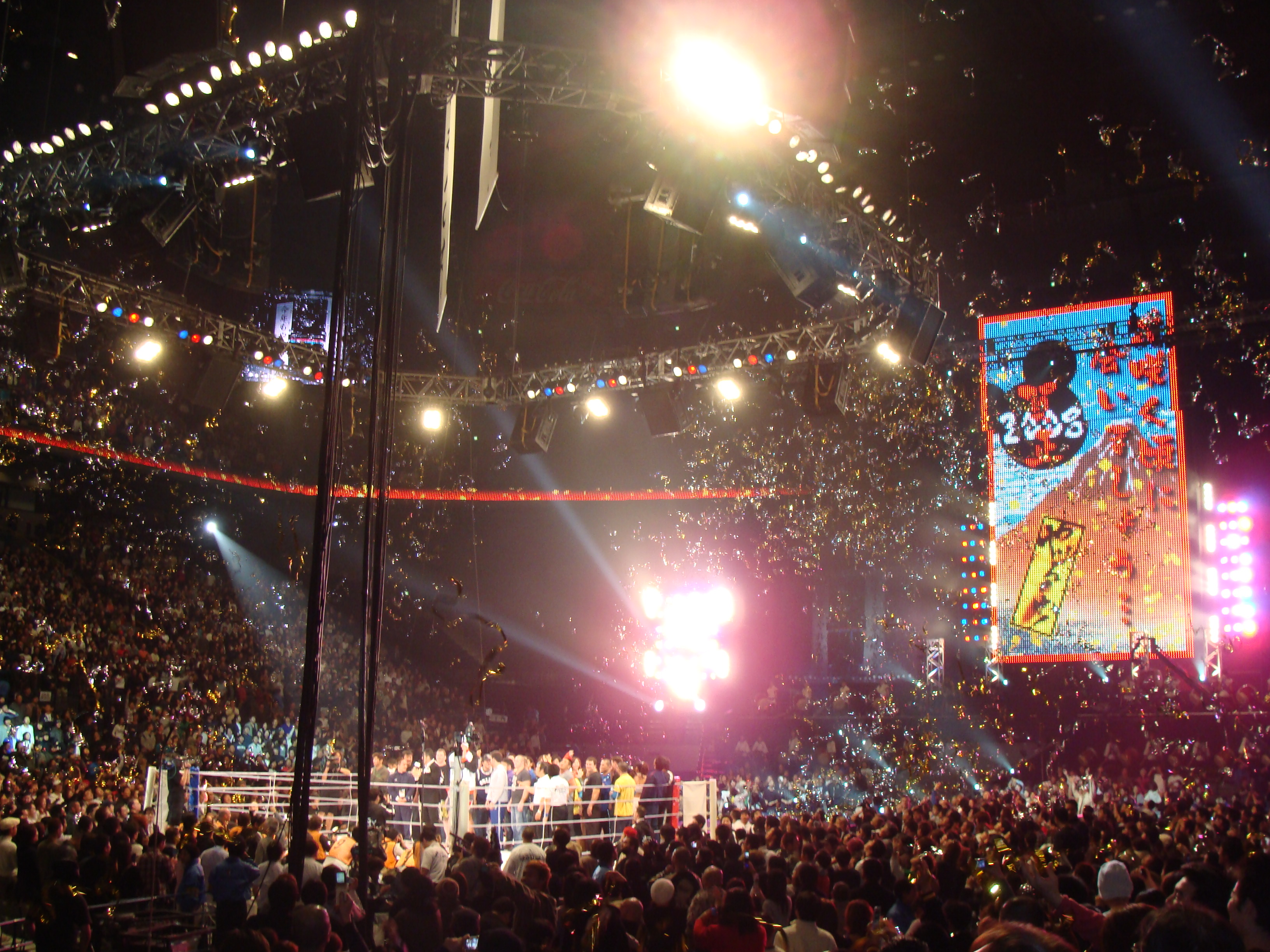
Closing Ceremony and New Years Celebration at Yarennoka!

- Before the last fight between Aoki and Jung, M-1 President and CEO Monte Cox thanked the crowd and praised the Japanese fans. He announced that M-1 Global would be back in Japan during 2008. Also, all of the fighters appeared in the ring after the final match to count down to the New Year and give fans their best wishes.

== See also ==
- Pride FC
- K-1 PREMIUM 2007 Dynamite!!
- K-1
- Dream
