= Yasushi Warita =

Japanese mixed martial artist

- Born: January 8, 1971 (age 55); Japan
- Nationality: Japanese
- Height: 5 ft 10 in (1.78 m)
- Weight: 169 lb (77 kg; 12.1 st)
- Division: Welterweight
- Years active: 1994–1998

Mixed martial arts record
- Total: 6
- Wins: 1
- By knockout: 1
- Losses: 4
- By submission: 4
- Draws: 1

Other information
- Mixed martial arts record from Sherdog

Yasushi Warita (born January 8, 1971) is a Japanese mixed martial artist. He competed in the Welterweight division.

== Mixed martial arts record ==
Professional record breakdown
6 matches	1 win	4 losses
By knockout	1	0
By submission	0	4
Draws	1	

Res.	Record	Opponent	Method	Event	Date	Round	Time	Location	Notes
Loss	1–4–1	Yuki Sasaki	Submission (heel hook)	Shooto: Gig '98 1st	April 10, 1998	1	1:19	Tokyo, Japan	
Win	1–3–1	Toru Koga	KO (head kick)	Shooto: Vale Tudo Junction 3	May 7, 1996	3	0:18	Tokyo, Japan	
Loss	0–3–1	Akihiro Gono	Submission (achilles lock)	Lumax Cup: Tournament of J '96	March 30, 1996	1	0:54	Japan	
Loss	0–2–1	Kazuhiro Kusayanagi	Submission (armbar)	Shooto: Vale Tudo Access 4	May 12, 1995	1	1:53	Japan	
Draw	0–1–1	Naoki Sakurada	Draw	Vale Tudo Japan 1994	July 29, 1994	5	3:00	Urayasu, Chiba, Japan	
Loss	0–1	Takeshi Tanaka	Submission (achilles lock)	Lumax Cup: Tournament of J '94	April 23, 1994	1	1:02	Japan	

== See also ==
- List of male mixed martial artists
