= Masanori Suda =

Japanese mixed martial arts fighter

- Born: July 24, 1973 (age 53); Japan
- Nationality: Japanese
- Height: 5 ft 11 in (1.80 m)
- Weight: 183 lb (83 kg; 13.1 st)
- Division: Middleweight; Welterweight; Lightweight
- Style: Judo, Sambo
- Team: Club J
- Rank: 3rd Dan Black Belt in Judo
- Years active: 1996 - 2005

Mixed martial arts record
- Total: 36
- Wins: 22
- By knockout: 1
- By submission: 15
- By decision: 6
- Losses: 11
- By knockout: 3
- By submission: 5
- By decision: 3
- Draws: 3

Other information
- Mixed martial arts record from Sherdog

Masanori Suda (born July 7, 1973) is a Japanese mixed martial artist. He competed in the Welterweight, Middleweight and Heavyweight divisions. Suda is known primarily for his time in Shooto, where he is a former Light Heavyweight Champion.

== Championships and accomplishments ==
=== Mixed martial arts ===
- Lumax Cup
  - Tournament of J '97 Middleweight Championship (1997)
- Shooto
  - Shooto Light Heavyweight Championship (one time)
    - Two successful title defenses'
- SuperBrawl
  - SuperBrawl Middleweight Championship (one time)

=== Sambo ===
- All Japan Sambo Championships
  - 20th All Japan Sambo Championship 82 kg class (1994)

== Mixed martial arts record ==
Professional record breakdown
36 matches	22 wins	11 losses
By knockout	1	3
By submission	15	5
By decision	6	3
Draws	3	

Res.	Record	Opponent	Method	Event	Date	Round	Time	Location	Notes
Loss	22–11–3	Murilo Bustamante	Submission (armbar)	Pride: Bushido 9	September 25, 2005	1	3:20	Tokyo, Japan	
Loss	22–10–3	Falaniko Vitale	KO (punch)	SB 39: Destiny	April 9, 2005	1	4:09	Honolulu, Hawaii, United States	
Win	22–9–3	Brian Ebersole	Submission (rear-naked choke)	Shooto: 1/29 in Korakuen Hall	January 29, 2005	3	2:59	Tokyo, Japan	
Draw	21–9–3	Dustin Denes	Draw	Shooto Hawaii: Soljah Fight Night	July 9, 2004	3	5:00	Honolulu, Hawaii, United States	
Win	21–9–2	Shannon Ritch	Submission (triangle choke)	SB 32: SuperBrawl 32	December 5, 2003	1	1:02	Honolulu, Hawaii, United States	
Draw	20–9–2	Ryuki Ueyama	Draw	Deep: 12th Impact	September 15, 2003	3	5:00	Tokyo, Japan	For the Deep Middleweight Championship.
Win	20–9–1	Egan Inoue	KO (punches)	SB 29: SuperBrawl 29	May 9, 2003	1	0:27	Honolulu, Hawaii, United States	
Win	19–9–1	Ryo Chonan	Decision (split)	Deep: 7th Impact	December 8, 2002	3	5:00	Tokyo, Japan	
Win	18–9–1	Ronald Jhun	Decision (majority)	Shooto: Treasure Hunt 7	June 29, 2002	3	5:00	Sakai, Osaka, Japan	
Win	17–9–1	Lance Gibson	Decision (unanimous)	Shooto: Treasure Hunt 1	January 12, 2002	3	5:00	Tokyo, Japan	
Draw	16–9–1	Larry Papadopoulos	Draw	Shooto: To The Top 7	August 26, 2001	3	5:00	Osaka, Japan	
Loss	16–9	Patrick Fortrie	Decision	GT: Golden Trophy 2001	March 1, 2001	1	5:00	France	
Loss	16–8	Akihiro Gono	Decision (unanimous)	Shooto: R.E.A.D. 12	November 12, 2000	3	5:00	Tokyo, Japan	
Loss	16–7	Lance Gibson	Decision (majority)	Shooto: R.E.A.D. 6	July 16, 2000	3	5:00	Tokyo, Japan	
Win	16–6	Yuki Sasaki	Decision (unanimous)	Shooto: R.E.A.D. 3	April 2, 2000	3	5:00	Kadoma, Osaka, Japan	
Win	15–6	Martijn de Jong	Submission (punches)	Shooto: Renaxis 5	October 29, 1999	2	4:44	Kadoma, Osaka, Japan	
Loss	14–6	Branden Lee Hinkle	TKO (upkicks)	VTJ 1998: Vale Tudo Japan 1998	October 25, 1998	1	5:26	Urayasu, Chiba, Japan	
Loss	14–5	Erik Paulson	TKO (punches)	Shooto: Las Grandes Viajes 5	August 29, 1998	3	4:48	Tokyo, Japan	
Win	14–4	Oherian Diarute	Submission (flying armbar)	GT: Golden Trophy 1998	March 28, 1998	2	0:00	France	
Win	13–4	Kenji Kawaguchi	Submission (armbar)	Shooto: Las Grandes Viajes 2	March 1, 1998	3	1:08	Tokyo, Japan	
Win	12–4	Ray Cooper	Submission (armbar)	Shooto: Las Grandes Viajes 1	January 17, 1998	1	1:55	Tokyo, Japan	
Win	11–4	Shunsuke Hayashi	Submission (heel hook)	Lumax Cup: Tournament of J '97 Middleweight Tournament	December 20, 1997	1	1:51	Japan	
Win	10–4	Izuru Takeuchi	Submission (toe hold)	Lumax Cup: Tournament of J '97 Middleweight Tournament	December 20, 1997	1	1:53	Japan	
Win	9–4	Mitsuhiro Suzuki	Decision (unanimous)	Lumax Cup: Tournament of J '97 Middleweight Tournament	December 20, 1997	2	3:00	Japan	
Win	8–4	Kazuhiro Kusayanagi	Decision (unanimous)	Shooto: Reconquista 3	August 27, 1997	3	5:00	Tokyo, Japan	
Loss	7–4	Sanae Kikuta	Submission (armbar)	Lumax Cup: Tournament of J '97 Heavyweight Tournament	July 27, 1997	1	3:59	Japan	
Win	7–3	Kaichi Tsuji	Submission (heel hook)	Lumax Cup: Tournament of J '97 Heavyweight Tournament	July 27, 1997	1	0:21	Japan	
Win	6–3	Ryuta Sakurai	Submission (armbar)	Lumax Cup: Tournament of J '97 Heavyweight Tournament	July 27, 1997	1	4:25	Japan	Return to Middleweight.
Loss	5–3	Masato Fujiwara	Submission (triangle armbar)	Shooto: Let's Get Lost	October 4, 1996	1	2:15	Tokyo, Japan	Lightweight debut.
Loss	5–2	Akihiro Gono	Submission (rear-naked choke)	Shooto: Free Fight Kawasaki	July 28, 1996	4	0:33	Kawasaki, Kanagawa, Japan	Middleweight bout.
Loss	5–1	Sanae Kikuta	Submission (heel hook)	Lumax Cup: Tournament of J '96	March 30, 1996	1	1:15	Japan	
Win	5–0	Kazunari Murakami	Submission (armbar)	Lumax Cup: Tournament of J '96	March 30, 1996	2	1:38	Japan	
Win	4–0	Yuzo Tateishi	Submission (armbar)	Lumax Cup: Tournament of J '96	March 30, 1996	1	1:51	Japan	
Win	3–0	Yuichi Otsuka	Submission (armbar)	Lumax Cup: Tournament of J '96	March 30, 1996	1	1:20	Japan	
Win	2–0	Isamu Osugi	Submission (armbar)	Shooto: Vale Tudo Junction 2	March 5, 1996	2	2:57	Tokyo, Japan	Welterweight debut.
Win	1–0	Genta Haga	Technical Submission (armbar)	Shooto: Vale Tudo Junction 1	January 20, 1996	1	1:02	Tokyo, Japan	

== See also ==
- List of male mixed martial artists
