= Taketo =

- Gender: Male

Origin
- Origin: Japanese
- Meaning: Different meanings depending on the kanji used

Taketo (written: 岳人 or 勇人) is a masculine Japanese given name. Notable people with the name include:

- Taketo Aoki (青木 勇人; born 1974), Japanese basketball player and coach
- Taketo Gohara, Japanese musician
- Taketo Shiokawa (塩川 岳人; born 1977), Japanese footballer

Taketō or Taketou (written: 武任) is a separate given name, though it may be romanized the same way. Notable people with the name include:

- Sagara Taketō (相良 武任; 1498–1551), Japanese samurai
