= Hayato Sakurai =

Japanese mixed martial artist

Hayato Sakurai 桜井速人
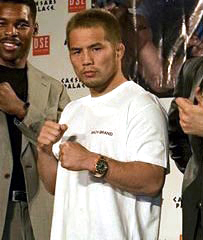
- Sakurai in 2007
- Born: August 24, 1975 (age 51); Ibaraki Prefecture, Japan
- Other names: Mach, Yasei no Charisma (Wild Charisma)
- Nationality: Japanese
- Height: 1.70 m (5 ft 7 in)
- Weight: 76 kg (168 lb; 12 st 0 lb)
- Division: Middleweight; Welterweight; Lightweight
- Style: Shootfighting, Wrestling, Muay Thai, Judo, Karate
- Team: Kiguchi Dojo; Gutsman Shooto Dojo; Mach Dojo
- Teachers: Noboru Asahi; Naoki Sakurada; Noriaki Kiguchi; Caesar Takeshi
- Rank: Honorary black belt in Brazilian jiu-jitsu A-Class Shootist
- Years active: 1996-present

Mixed martial arts record
- Total: 53
- Wins: 38
- By knockout: 12
- By submission: 10
- By decision: 16
- Losses: 13
- By knockout: 5
- By submission: 4
- By decision: 4
- Draws: 2

Other information
- Mixed martial arts record from Sherdog

Hayato Sakurai
Medal record

Representing Japan

Submission Wrestling

ADCC World Championship
Bronze medal – third place	1999 Abu Dhabi	-77kg
Silver medal – second place	1999 Abu Dhabi	Open

Hayato Sakurai (Japanese: 桜井 速人, Sakurai Hayato) (born August 24, 1975) also known as Mach (マッハ, Mahha), is a Japanese mixed martial artist. A professional competitor since 1996, he has formerly competed for the UFC, PRIDE, DREAM, Shooto, Vale Tudo Japan, DEEP, and participated in the Yarennoka!, Dynamite!! 2008, Dynamite!! 2009, Dynamite!! 2010, and Fight For Japan: Genki Desu Ka Omisoka 2011 events. Sakurai finished second (Silver) in the Absolute Class (no weight limit) ADCC Submission Wrestling World Championship in 1999 at just under 77 kg. During the height of his career in 2000 and 2001 he was considered to be one of the top pound for pound fighters in MMA. He is the former Shooto Middleweight Champion.

His nickname, "Mach", pronounced ma-ha in Japanese was taken as a tribute to his childhood professional wrestling hero, Higo Shigehisashi better known as Mach Hayato, the first Japanese professional wrestler to completely embrace the Mexican style of lucha libre and was also among the group of professional wrestlers who made the transition to shoot wrestling as part of the original UWF movement.

== Background ==
Sakurai began training in judo during middle school, gaining several championships and then also began training in karate. During high school, he became friends with fellow combat sportsmen Michihiro Omigawa and Kazuyuki Miyata. He later became interested in shootboxing and joined Caesar Takeshi's dojo, competing for his promotion during years. In 1996, he wandered in mixed martial arts and entered Kiguchi Dojo, where he trained with Noriaki Kiguchi and Satoru Sayama's apprentice Noboru Asahi. At the end, he ended joining the Shooto organization along with a young Takanori Gomi.

== Mixed martial arts career ==
=== Shooto ===
Joining Naoki Sakurada's Gutsman team, Sakurai made his professional debut in Shooto on October 4, 1996 by submitting Caol Uno. Over the next five years he would go undefeated in eighteen bouts, representing the promotion in three consecutive victories at the renowned Vale Tudo Japan event, as well as French MMA promotion Golden Trophy 1999. Hayato would also win that organization's Shooto Middleweight Champion from Jutaro Nakao, which he defended before Tetsuji Kato.

In a less official light, he contended with Rumina Sato for the fastest victory at the time, knocking out Ademir Oliveira with a spectacular flying knee in 0:34 seconds moments before Sato beat him with a flying armbar in 0:08 against Charles Diaz.

During his final times on the company, Sakurai also faced future UFC challenger Frank Trigg in an exciting battle. The two brawled in the clinch, with Trigg landing knees while Hayato threw punches and kicks to the body and leg; at one instance, Trigg almost knocked out Sakurai, stunning him and landing multiple undefended punches both standing and on the ground which drew blood. Trigg continued dominating through the second round, until Sakurai finally came back knocking him down with a left hook, and he managed to finish the fight with multiple knee strikes to the face, winning by KO.

In August 2001, Sakurai was finally defeated by future longtime UFC Middleweight Champion Anderson Silva, losing his championship title. After the loss, and subsequent to a severe car accident, Sakurai stopped fighting for Shooto full-time.

=== Ultimate Fighting Championship ===
On March 22, 2002, Sakurai stepped into Ultimate Fighting Championship to fight the UFC Welterweight Champion Matt Hughes at UFC 36. Hughes started the match taking down Sakurai repeatedly, but Sakurai worked submission attempts from the bottom and managed to capture Hughes's back. The second round saw Hayato landing a solid left hand and a knee to the head, which Hughes got back on the third by slamming Sakurai hard on the mat with a takedown and landing several strikes on the ground. The fourth would see the final action, with Hughes managing to knock down Sakurai and perform ground and pound until the referee stopped the fight as a TKO in favor of Hughes.

=== PRIDE ===
After losing to Hughes, Sakurai fought periodically in Shooto and DEEP before joining PRIDE Fighting Championships, Japan's largest MMA organization. During this time he was inconsistent in his performances, often losing to much lower-ranked opponents. He also attempted to fight at 183 lb (83 kg)., but it was clear that his frame was far too small for that weight, and his performances suffered. Some speculated Sakurai's seeming loss of spirit and mental focus came from his infamous car accident he suffered after fighting Silva.

Sakurai made an underwhelming debut before Daiju Takase in PRIDE Shockwave 2003. Takase controlled a part of the first round, taking down Sakurai and bloodying his nose with punches. At this point, however, Mach started coming back, hijacking the standing segments with superior striking and negating Takase's submission attempts in order to do damage through his guard. The Shooto fighter ended the fight taking down Takase several times and controlling the action, which gained him a unanimous decision.

In his next apparitions for PRIDE Bushido, Sakurai would face two members of the Gracie family, Rodrigo and Crosley, but he was unsuccessful in both ventures. He fought an uneventful match against the former, stopping him from passing guard for the first round and being stopped himself from passing guard in the second, before receiving some knees to the head which gained Gracie the decision; and he then lost by submission to the latter, despite him showing a better performance until the last minutes.

In 2005 Sakurai regained focus and went to the US to train with legendary Pancrase coach Matt Hume. It was announced that he would drop down to 160 lb (73 kg). in order to participate in the PRIDE Lightweight Grand Prix. Despite his revered and legendary early career some questioned if Sakurai could make an impact in the division. Sakurai silenced his critics when he defeated former UFC Lightweight Champion Jens Pulver and former Shooto Lightweight Champion Joachim Hansen on the same night to advance to the tournament finals.

The match with Pulver was specially acclaimed, as it featured high speed and an exciting give and take. Sakurai peppered his opponent with strikes and kicks before receiving a left hand which seemed to put him down. He recovered and injured Pulver's eye with a combo, only to immediately land a front kick directly to the same eye, but then Hayato received another sudden left hook, which anticipated a possible finish. However, for a second time, Sakurai came back and pressed action, finally bringing him down with a body shot and a knee strike for the TKO. The bout was called "awesome" and "Fight of the Year Contender-level" by analyst Scott Newman. Similarly back and forth would be the fight against Hansen: the two fighters exchanged strikes, hip throws and leglocks through the entire bout, while Sakurai landed spinning back kicks and a close armbar attempt. Sakurai got the decision win, and it set off a match in the finals against Takanori Gomi, Sakurai's former colleague and training partner.

On December 31, 2005 Sakurai fought Gomi for the first ever PRIDE Fighting Championships 160 lb (73 kg) championship of the world. Although fighting with a torn ACL he suffered in training just three weeks prior to the fight, though this was not known outside of his coaching circle at the time, Sakurai initially had the upper-hand, pounding Gomi with brutal inside-leg kicks. A few minutes into the round Sakurai attempted a judo throw, but the ring ropes got in the way and caused him to crash head first on the mat with Gomi taking his back. Takanori capitalized and rained down punches on him, and although Sakurai was able to return to his feet, he was overwhelmed and knocked out with a punching combo.

Despite the loss to Gomi, Sakurai would continue to impress with his performances. At Bushido 11 he scored a brutal knockout over WEC veteran Olaf Alfonso. On August 26, 2006, Mach fought Brazilian Luciano Azevedo at Bushido 12. After several minutes of attempted ground and pound by Azevedo, the fighters were stood back up. Mach then consistently stuffed Azevedo's takedowns, and landed a fight-ending knee on Azevedo over his left eye. The fight was stopped, TKO by cut.

Sakurai fought against former King of the Cage Lightweight Champion and future The Ultimate Fighter 6 Winner Mac Danzig at PRIDE 33. Sakurai won the fight via knockout in the second round. Sakurai was then defeated by David Baron by submission in the first round. Sakurai then defeated Kuniyoshi Hironaka via unanimous decision. Sakurai then went on to defeat professional wrestler Katsuyori Shibata by TKO at Dynamite!! 2008. In a shocking start, Shibata charged across the ring and almost fell through the ropes when Sakurai dodged him, and then unloaded all his offensive with the intention to end the fight early, but Hayato took him down and punished him methodically until the stoppage.

=== DREAM ===
After PRIDE's folding, Sakurai joined its offshoot promotion DREAM, in whose Welterweight Grand Prix he took part. He faced top-ranked lightweight Shinya Aoki at DREAM 8 in a match with revenge overtones, as Sakurai had defeated Aoki back in Shooto in what was called a controversial decision. This time, Sakurai won in impressive fashion, sweeping over a charging Aoki and delivering knees to the head and punches for a KO at 0:27. He then lost at DREAM 10 in the semi-final of the tournament to eventual winner Marius Zaromskis in a huge upset, conceding the loss via knockout from a head kick and punches.

At Dynamite!! 2009 New Year's Eve show in Saitama, Sakurai fought against another Shooto legend, Akihiro Gono. Sakurai controlled the fight early on, outstriking Gono both standing and from the half guard, but eventually lost via armbar submission in the second round. He fought Nick Diaz at DREAM 14 and was caught in an armbar submission again. After this fight he has speculated on retiring saying that he was good physically, but not mentally.

Sakurai was to have a rematch against Marius Žaromskis in DREAM 17 a non-title fight. However, he injured his leg which has forced off of the DREAM 17 card and was replaced by Eiji Ishikawa.

Sakurai returned at Fight For Japan: Genki Desu Ka Omisoka 2011 where he faced Ryo Chonan. He won the fight via unanimous decision.

He then faced Phil Baroni at the subsequent New Year's card by Dream, DREAM 18, defeating him via unanimous decision.

=== Post-DREAM ===
Almost a year later, Sakurai returned to face Jae Suk Lim at Mach Dojo / Gladiator: Mach Festival. Sakurai lost by TKO in the first round.

He competed in the Tokyo International Jiu-Jitsu Open Championship 2009, ranking himself as a Brazilian jiu-jitsu black belt for his grappling expertise. He opened the first round against Akira Uemura, but was eliminated.

=== Rizin FF ===
After not competing in over three years, Sakurai made his MMA return for Rizin Fighting Federation. He faced Wataru Sakata at Rizin World Grand-Prix 2016: Final Round on December 31, 2016 and won the fight via TKO in the second round.

== Fighting style ==
Sakurai favored grinding low kicks and technical boxing along with a wide usage of knee strikes, including flying knees. A clinch user, Sakurai performed hip throws during his matches, favouring o goshi, uki goshi and ippon seoi nage. Finally, he used his background in shoot wrestling in his grappling technique. He was the only user of this discipline in reaching the ADCC finals both in his weight and absolute division, defeating grapplers like Ricco Rodriguez and Vinny Magalhães.

== Championships and accomplishments ==
- DREAM
  - 2009 DREAM Welterweight Grand Prix Semifinalist
- PRIDE Fighting Championships
  - 2005 PRIDE Lightweight Grand Prix Runner-Up
- Shooto
  - Shooto Welterweight Championship (One Time)
    - One successful title defense

== Mixed martial arts record ==
Professional record breakdown
53 matches	38 wins	13 losses
By knockout	12	5
By submission	10	4
By decision	16	4
Draws	2	

Res.	Record	Opponent	Method	Event	Date	Round	Time	Location	Notes
Win	38–13–2	Wataru Sakata	TKO (punches)	Rizin World Grand-Prix 2016: Final Round	December 31, 2016	2	12:37	Saitama, Japan	
Loss	37–13–2	Jae Suk Lim	TKO (punches)	Mach Dojo / Gladiator: Mach Festival	September 29, 2013	1	5:21	Tokyo, Japan	
Win	37–12–2	Phil Baroni	Decision (unanimous)	DREAM 18	December 31, 2012	3	5:00	Tokyo, Japan	
Win	36–12–2	Ryo Chonan	Decision (unanimous)	Fight For Japan: Genki Desu Ka Omisoka 2011	December 31, 2011	3	5:00	Saitama, Japan	
Loss	35–12–2	Jason High	Decision (split)	Dynamite!! 2010	December 31, 2010	3	5:00	Saitama, Japan	
Loss	35–11–2	Nick Diaz	Submission (armbar)	DREAM 14	May 29, 2010	1	3:54	Saitama, Japan	Non-title bout.
Loss	35–10–2	Akihiro Gono	Submission (armbar)	Dynamite!! The Power of Courage 2009	December 31, 2009	2	3:56	Saitama, Japan	
Loss	35–9–2	Marius Žaromskis	KO (head kick)	DREAM 10	July 20, 2009	1	4:03	Saitama, Japan	DREAM Welterweight Grand Prix Semifinal Round
Win	35–8–2	Shinya Aoki	KO (knees & punches)	DREAM 8	April 5, 2009	1	0:27	Nagoya, Japan	DREAM Welterweight Grand Prix Opening Round
Win	34–8–2	Katsuyori Shibata	TKO (punches)	Fields Dynamite!! 2008	December 31, 2008	1	7:01	Saitama, Japan	Middleweight bout.
Win	33–8–2	Kuniyoshi Hironaka	Decision (unanimous)	Dream 6: Middleweight Grand Prix 2008 Final Round	September 23, 2008	2	5:00	Saitama, Japan	
Loss	32–8–2	David Baron	Submission (guillotine choke)	Shooto: Shooto Tradition 1	May 3, 2008	1	4:50	Tokyo, Japan	
Win	32–7–2	Hidetaka Monma	TKO (punches)	Dream 1: Lightweight Grand Prix 2008 First Round	March 15, 2008	1	4:12	Saitama, Japan	
Win	31–7–2	Hidehiko Hasegawa	Decision (unanimous)	Yarennoka!	December 31, 2007	3	5:00	Saitama, Japan	Return to Welterweight.
Win	30–7–2	Mac Danzig	KO (punch)	PRIDE 33	February 24, 2007	2	4:01	Las Vegas, Nevada, United States	Catchweight (164 lb) bout.
Win	29–7–2	Luciano Azevedo	TKO (doctor stoppage)	Pride - Bushido 12	August 26, 2006	1	4:35	Nagoya, Japan	
Win	28–7–2	Olaf Alfonso	KO (punch)	Pride - Bushido 11	June 4, 2006	1	1:54	Saitama, Japan	
Loss	27–7–2	Takanori Gomi	KO (punches)	Pride FC: Shockwave 2005	December 31, 2005	1	3:56	Saitama, Japan	Final of the PRIDE Lightweight Grand Prix to crown the inaugural PRIDE Lightweight Champion.
Win	27–6–2	Joachim Hansen	Decision (unanimous)	Pride: Bushido 9	September 25, 2005	2	5:00	Tokyo, Japan	Semifinal of the PRIDE Lightweight Grand Prix
Win	26–6–2	Jens Pulver	TKO (punches)	Pride: Bushido 9	September 25, 2005	1	8:56	Tokyo, Japan	Opening Round of the PRIDE Lightweight Grand Prix
Win	25–6–2	Shinya Aoki	Decision (unanimous)	Shooto: Alive Road	August 20, 2005	3	5:00	Yokohama, Japan	
Win	24–6–2	Milton Vieira	Decision (split)	Pride: Bushido 7	May 22, 2005	2	5:00	Tokyo, Japan	Lightweight debut.
Loss	23–6–2	Crosley Gracie	Submission (armbar)	PRIDE Bushido 5	October 14, 2004	2	1:02	Osaka, Japan	Middleweight debut.
Win	23–5–2	Brady Fink	Submission (guillotine choke)	PRIDE Bushido 4	July 19, 2004	1	4:08	Nagoya, Japan	
Loss	22–5–2	Rodrigo Gracie	Decision (unanimous)	PRIDE Bushido 2	February 15, 2004	2	5:00	Yokohama, Japan	
Win	22–4–2	Daiju Takase	Decision (unanimous)	PRIDE Shockwave 2003	December 31, 2003	3	5:00	Saitama, Japan	
Loss	21–4–2	Ryo Chonan	TKO (cut)	Deep - 12th Impact	September 15, 2003	3	2:10	Japan	
Win	21–3–2	Dave Menne	TKO (cut)	DEEP: 10th Impact	June 25, 2003	2	2:02	Japan	
Win	20–3–2	Ryuki Ueyama	Decision (unanimous)	Deep - 8th Impact	March 4, 2003	3	5:00	Japan	
Loss	19–3–2	Jake Shields	Decision (unanimous)	Shooto: Year End Show 2002	December 14, 2002	3	5:00	Tokyo, Japan	
Loss	19–2–2	Matt Hughes	TKO (strikes)	UFC 36	March 22, 2002	4	3:01	Las Vegas, United States	For the UFC Welterweight Championship
Win	19–1–2	Dan Gilbert	Submission (heel hook)	Shooto: To The Top Final Act	December 16, 2001	1	1:52	Tokyo, Japan	
Loss	18–1–2	Anderson Silva	Decision (unanimous)	Shooto: To The Top 7	August 26, 2001	3	5:00	Japan	Lost the Shooto Middleweight Championship
Win	18–0–2	Jean Louis Alberch	Decision	GT: Golden Trophy 2001	March 1, 2001	2	3:00	France	
Win	17–0–2	Frank Trigg	KO (knees)	Shooto: R.E.A.D. Final	December 17, 2000	2	2:25	Tokyo, Japan	
Win	16–0–2	Luiz Azeredo	Decision (unanimous)	Shooto: R.E.A.D. 8	August 4, 2000	3	5:00	Osaka, Japan	
Win	15–0–2	Tetsuji Kato	Decision (split)	Shooto: R.E.A.D. 2	March 17, 2000	3	5:00	Tokyo, Japan	Defended the Shooto Middleweight Championship
Win	14–0–2	Haroldo Bunn	TKO (punches)	VTJ 1999: Vale Tudo Japan 1999	December 11, 1999	3	1:31	Tokyo, Japan	
Win	13–0–2	Brad Aird	Submission (armbar)	Shooto: Renaxis 2	July 16, 1999	1	0:37	Tokyo, Japan	
Win	12–0–2	Marcelo Aguiar	Decision (unanimous)	Shooto: 10th Anniversary Event	May 29, 1999	3	5:00	Yokohama, Japan	
Win	11–0–2	Jean Louis Alberch	Submission (armbar)	GT: Golden Trophy 1999	March 20, 1999	1	0:33	France	
Win	10–0–2	Damien Riccio	Decision	GT: Golden Trophy 1999	March 20, 1999	1	5:00	France	
Win	9–0–2	James Schiavo	Submission (toe hold)	GT: Golden Trophy 1999	March 20, 1999	1	0:26	France	
Win	8–0–2	Ademir Oliveira	KO (flying knee)	Shooto: Devilock Fighters	January 15, 1999	1	0:34	Tokyo, Japan	
Win	7–0–2	Sergei Bytchkov	Submission (armbar)	VTJ 1998: Vale Tudo Japan 1998	October 28, 1998	1	4:59	Japan	
Win	6–0–2	Ronny Rivano	Submission (rear-naked choke)	Shooto: Las Grandes Viajes 4	July 29, 1998	1	1:10	Tokyo, Japan	
Win	5–0–2	Jutaro Nakao	Decision (unanimous)	Shooto: Las Grandes Viajes 3	May 13, 1998	3	5:00	Tokyo, Japan	Won the Shooto Middleweight Championship
Draw	4–0–2	Marcelo Aguiar	Draw	VTJ 1997: Vale Tudo Japan 1997	November 29, 1997	3	8:00	Japan	
Win	4–0–1	Alex Cook	Submission (rear naked choke)	Shooto: Reconquista 4	October 12, 1997	1	1:09	Tokyo, Japan	
Win	3–0–1	Ali Elias	Submission (armbar)	Shooto: Reconquista 3	August 27, 1997	1	1:23	Tokyo, Japan	
Win	2–0–1	Hiroyuki Kojima	Decision (unanimous)	Shooto: Gig	June 25, 1997	2	5:00	Tokyo, Japan	
Draw	1–0–1	Takuya Kuwabara	Draw	Shooto: Reconquista 1	January 18, 1997	3	3:00	Tokyo, Japan	
Win	1–0	Caol Uno	Submission (armbar)	Shooto: Let's Get Lost	October 4, 1996	1	2:52	Tokyo, Japan	

Legend: Win Loss Draw/No contest

=== Mixed martial arts exhibition record ===
Exhibition record breakdown		
1 match	0 wins	0 losses
By knockout	0	0
By submission	0	0
By decision	0	0
Draws	1	

Res.	Record	Opponent	Method	Event	Date	Round	Time	Location	Notes
Draw	0-0-1	Rumina Sato	Technical Draw	World＆Wild 1	April 4, 2008	1	3:00	Tokyo, Japan	

== Kickboxing record ==
Kickboxing record
1 wins (0 KOs), 0 loss
Date	Result	Opponent	Event	Location	Method	Round	Time	Record
October 28, 2007	Win	(Sweden) Jani Lax	Shootboxing Battle Summit Ground Zero Tokyo 2007	Tokyo, Japan	Decision (unanimous)	3	3:00	1-0
Legend: Win Loss Draw/No contest

== Submission grappling record ==
KO PUNCHES

Result	Opponent	Method	Event	Date	Round	Time	Notes
Loss	(Brazil) Israel Alburquerque	Points	ADCC 2000 –77 kg	2000	1		
Loss	(Brazil) Roberto Traven	Points	ADCC 1999 Absolute	1999		20:00	
Win	(United States) Ricco Rodriguez	Points	ADCC 1999 Absolute	1999		10:00	
Win	(Brazil) Vinicius Magalhaes	Points	ADCC 1999 Absolute	1999		15:00	
Win	(Brazil) Eddie Ruiz	Submission	ADCC 1999 –77 kg	1999	1	00:17	
Loss	(Brazil) Jean-Jacques Machado	Submission	ADCC 1999 –77 kg	1999	1	5:09	
Win	(Brazil) Fabiano Iha	Points	ADCC 1999 –77 kg	1999		10:00	
Win	(Brazil) Andre Pederneiras		ADCC 1999 –77 kg	1999		15:00	
