= Hayato Okamoto =

Hayato Okamoto may refer to:

- Hayato Okamoto (cyclist) (born 1995), Japanese cyclist
- Hayato Okamoto (footballer) (born 1974), Japanese footballer
