= Naoki Sakurada =

Japanese mixed martial artist

Naoki Sakurada 桜田直樹
- Born: May 12, 1966 (age 60); Japan
- Other names: Mr. Gutsman
- Nationality: Japanese
- Height: 5 ft 7 in (1.70 m)
- Weight: 168 lb (76 kg; 12.0 st)
- Division: Welterweight; Middleweight
- Style: Combat wrestling
- Team: Kiguchi Dojo; Gutsman Shooto Dojo (2000–present)
- Teacher: Noriaki Kiguchi
- Years active: 1989–1995

Mixed martial arts record
- Total: 22
- Wins: 12
- By knockout: 2
- By submission: 5
- By decision: 5
- Losses: 6
- By knockout: 1
- By submission: 4
- By decision: 1
- Draws: 4

Other information
- Mixed martial arts record from Sherdog

Naoki Sakurada Japanese: 桜田直樹 (born May 12, 1968) is a Japanese mixed martial artist. He competed in the Welterweight and Middleweight divisions. He is a former Shooto Middleweight Champion.

== Mixed martial arts career ==
Sakurada started as a student of combat wrestling's (Japanese version of submission wrestling founding father Noriaki Kiguchi at Kiguchi Dojo. Sakurada competed almost exclusively in Shooto events, with the only exception when he faced Yasushi Warita at Vale Tudo Japan 1994 which ended in a draw. Sakurada challenged Yasuto Sekishima for the Shooto Middleweight Championship at Shooto - Shooto on November 28, 1990 but the bout ended in a draw.

A rematch of the championship bout took place at Shooto - Shooto on October 17, 1991. Sakurada claimed the title via unanimous decision and went on to successfully defend it once against Kazuhiro Kusayanagi at Shooto - Shooto on December 23, 1991 via majority decision.

At the turn of the millennium he founded Gutsman Shooto Dojo, where he has coached mixed martial artists such as Hayato Sakurai, Hisae Watanabe and Mizuto Hirota.

== Championships and accomplishments ==
- Shooto
  - Shooto Middleweight Championship (one time)
    - One title defense

== Mixed martial arts record ==
Professional record breakdown
22 matches	12 wins	6 losses
By knockout	2	1
By submission	5	4
By decision	5	1
Draws	4	

Res.	Record	Opponent	Method	Event	Date	Round	Time	Location	Notes
Win	12–6–4	Yasunori Okuda	Submission (heel hook)	Shooto - Vale Tudo Access 4	May 12, 1995	1	3:00	Japan	
Win	11–6–4	Maurice Roumimper	Submission (heel hook)	Shooto - Vale Tudo Access 3	January 21, 1995	2	1:10	Tokyo, Japan	
Win	10–6–4	Kotaro Shimamoto	Decision (unanimous)	Shooto - Vale Tudo Access 1	September 26, 1994	5	3:00	Tokyo, Japan	
Draw	9–6–4	Yasushi Warita	Draw	Vale Tudo Japan 1994	July 29, 1994	5	3:00	Urayasu, Chiba, Japan	
Win	9–6–3	Yuji Hashiguchi	KO	Shooto - Shooto	May 6, 1994	3	1:18	Tokyo, Japan	
Draw	8–6–3	Erik Paulson	Draw	Shooto - Shooto	November 25, 1993	5	3:00	Tokyo, Japan	
Loss	8–6–2	Manabu Yamada	Submission (kneebar)	Shooto - Shooto	February 26, 1993	5	1:19	Tokyo, Japan	
Win	8–5–2	Kazuhiro Kusayanagi	Decision (unanimous)	Shooto - Shooto	September 25, 1992	5	3:00	Tokyo, Japan	
Win	7–5–2	Tomohiro Tanaka	KO	Shooto - Shooto	July 23, 1992	2	0:00	Tokyo, Japan	
Loss	6–5–2	Yuichi Watanabe	Submission (kneebar)	Shooto - Shooto	May 29, 1992	3	0:57	Tokyo, Japan	
Win	6–4–2	Kazuhiro Kusayanagi	Decision (majority)	Shooto - Shooto	December 23, 1991	5	3:00	Tokyo, Japan	Defended the Shooto Middleweight Championship.
Win	5–4–2	Yasuto Sekishima	Decision (majority)	Shooto - Shooto	October 17, 1991	5	3:00	Osaka, Japan	Won the Shooto Middleweight Championship.
Win	4–4–2	Yuichi Watanabe	Submission (armbar)	Shooto - Shooto	August 25, 1991	5	2:03	Tokyo, Japan	
Win	3–4–2	Tomonori Ohara	Submission (armbar)	Shooto - Shooto	May 31, 1991	5	0:00	Tokyo, Japan	
Loss	2–4–2	Kenji Kawaguchi	Submission (guillotine choke)	Shooto - Shooto	January 13, 1991	1	0:00	Tokyo, Japan	
Draw	2–3–2	Yasuto Sekishima	Draw	Shooto - Shooto	November 28, 1990	5	3:00	Tokyo, Japan	For the Shoot Middleweight Championship.
Draw	2–3–1	Yuji Ito	Draw	Shooto - Shooto	September 8, 1990	5	3:00	Tokyo, Japan	
Loss	2–3	Yasuto Sekishima	Decision	Shooto - Shooto	July 7, 1990	5	3:00	Tokyo, Japan	
Loss	2–2	Kenji Kawaguchi	TKO (punches)	Shooto - Shooto	January 13, 1990	4	1:29	Tokyo, Japan	
Win	2–1	Takashi Ishizaki	Decision (unanimous)	Shooto - Shooto	October 19, 1989	3	3:00	Tokyo, Japan	
Win	1–1	Yuichi Watanabe	Submission (heel hook)	Shooto - Shooto	July 29, 1989	1	0:00	Tokyo, Japan	
Loss	0–1	Kazuhiro Kusayanagi	Submission (armbar)	Shooto - Shooto	May 18, 1989	1	0:00	Tokyo, Japan	

== See also ==
- List of male mixed martial artists
