= List of Shooto champions =

This is a list of Shooto world champions at each weight class. Shooto is a Japan-based mixed martial arts (MMA) promoting and sanctioning organization founded first in 1985 as a particular fighting system, and then in 1989 as an MMA promotion.

Shooto used to promote different weight classes than the Association of Boxing Commissions, which are used by most MMA promotions. On January 1, 2015, weight limits were changed to the divisions established by the Nevada State Athletic Commission. Then, on January 1, 2017, the names of the weight classes were also changed to the names established by NSAC.

== Current champions ==
Men
Division	Champion	Since	Defenses
Middleweight	(Japan) Taiga Iwasaki	July 20, 2026	0
Welterweight	(Japan) Ryuichiro Sumimura	November 3, 2025	0
Lightweight	(Japan) Yuji Ephoeviga	March 29, 2026	0
Featherweight	(Japan) Sasuke	July 25, 2021	3
Bantamweight	(Japan) Kanata Nagai	September 21, 2025	0
Flyweight	(Japan) Ryoga	November 16, 2025	0
Strawweight	(Japan) Koyuru Tanoue	December 29, 2024	2

Women
Division	Champion	Since	Defenses
Strawweight	(Japan) Emi Fujino	May 18, 2024	0
Strawweight	(South Korea) Park Bo-hyun (interim)	July 21, 2025	0
Super Atomweight	(Japan) Ayaka Watanabe	May 21, 2023	1
Atomweight	(Japan) Hikaru Aono	March 29, 2026	0

== Men's championships ==
=== Middleweight Championship ===
Weight limit of 83.9 kg (185 lb)
The weight limit was 83 kg (183 lb) prior to January 1, 2015. The Middleweight Championship was known as the Light Heavyweight Championship prior to January 1, 2017.

No.	Name	Event	Date	Reign (total)	Defenses
1	(Japan) Kenji Kawaguchi def. Manabu Yamada	Shooto: Shooto; Tokyo, Japan	May 31, 1991	1,803 days	1. def. Satoshi Honma on October 17, 1991; 2. def. Manabu Yamada on July 23, 1992; 3. drew with Satoshi Honma on November 27, 1992
2	(United States) Erik Paulson	Shooto: Vale Tudo Junction 3 Tokyo, Japan	May 7, 1996	1,605 days	1. def. Masanori Suda on August 29, 1998
Paulson vacated the title on September 28, 2000 when he retired from the sport.
3	(Japan) Masanori Suda def. Lance Gibson	Shooto: Treasure Hunt 1 Tokyo, Japan	January 12, 2002	1,497 days	1. def. Egan Inoue on May 9, 2003; 2. drew with Dustin Denes on July 9, 2004
Suda vacated the title on February 17, 2006, at his retirement ceremony.
4	(Japan) Shiko Yamashita def. Dustin Denes	Absolute Fighting Championships 16; Boca Raton, FL, US	April 22, 2006	449 days	
5	(Netherlands) Siyar Bahadurzada	Shooto: Back To Our Roots 4 Tokyo, Japan	July 15, 2007	1,735 days	1. def. Leandro Silva on August 27, 2009; 2. def. Carlos Alexandre Pereira on August 6, 2010
Bahadurzada vacated the title on April 14, 2012 after signing with the UFC.
6	(Japan) Yushin Okami	Shooto 2024 Vol.8; Tokyo, Japan	November 30, 2024	455 days	
Okami vacated the title on February 28, 2026.
7	(Japan) Taiga Iwasaki def. Yuji Arai	Professional Shooto 2026 Vol.5; Tokyo, Japan	July 20, 2026	19 days (incumbent)	

=== Welterweight Championship ===
Weight limit of 77.1 kg (170 lb)
The weight limit was 77 kg (169.8 lb) prior to January 1, 2015. The Welterweight Championship was known as the Middleweight Championship prior to January 1, 2017.

No.	Name	Event	Date	Reign (total)	Defenses
1	(Japan) Yasuto Sekishima def. Yoshimasa Ishikawa	Shooto: Shooto; Tokyo, Japan	May 12, 1990	448 days	1. drew with Naoki Sakurada on November 28, 1990
2	(Japan) Yoshimasa Ishikawa	Shooto: Shooto; Tokyo, Japan	August 3, 1991	? days	
Ishikawa vacated the title in 1991 to compete as a lightweight.
3	(Japan) Naoki Sakurada def. Yasuto Sekishima	Shooto: Shooto; Osaka, Japan	October 17, 1991	1,920 days	1. def. Kazuhiro Kusayanagi on September 25, 1992
Sakurada vacated the title on January 18, 1997, when he retired.
4	(Japan) Hayato "Mach" Sakurai	Shooto: Las Grandes Viajes 3 Tokyo, Japan	May 13, 1998	1,201 days	1. def. Tetsuji Kato on March 17, 2000
5	(Brazil) Anderson Silva	Shooto: To The Top 7 Osaka, Japan	August 26, 2001	136 days	
Silva vacated the title on January 9, 2002, after signing with Pride.
6	(United States) Jake Shields def. Ray Cooper	Shooto Hawaii: Soljah Fight Night; Honolulu, HI, US	July 9, 2004	158 days	
7	(Japan) Akira Kikuchi	Shooto: Year End Show 2004; Tokyo, Japan	December 14, 2004	430 days	
8	(Japan) Shinya Aoki	Shooto: The Victory of the Truth; Tokyo, Japan	February 17, 2006	1,554 days	1. def. Akira Kikuchi on February 17, 2007
Aoki vacated the title on May 21, 2010 after years of not defending it, fighting for other promotions, and fighting primarily as a lightweight.
9	(Brazil) Luis Ramos def. Igor Fernandes	Shooto Brazil 17; Rio de Janeiro, Brazil	August 6, 2010	368 days	
Ramos vacated the title on August 9, 2011, after signing with the UFC.
10	(Brazil) Hernani Perpetuo def. Tommy Depret	Shooto: Gig Tokyo 15; Tokyo, Japan	August 25, 2013	4,453 days	1. def. Yukinari Tamura on November 23, 2023
—	(Japan) Ryuichiro Sumimura def. Souki Toyama for interim title	Shooto 2025 Vol.6; Tokyo, Japan	July 21, 2025	—	
Perpetuo vacated the title on November 3, 2025, due to suffering an injury in training, rendering him unable to defend the title.
11	(Japan) Ryuichiro Sumimura promoted to undisputed champion	—	November 3, 2025	278 days (incumbent)	

=== Lightweight Championship ===
Weight limit of 70.3 kg (155 lb)
The weight limit was 70 kg (154.3 lb) prior to January 1, 2015. The Lightweight Championship was known as the Welterweight Championship prior to January 1, 2017.

No.	Name	Event	Date	Reign (total)	Defenses
1	(Japan) Yuichi Watanabe def. Kazuhiro Kusayanagi	Shooto: Shooto; Tokyo, Japan	March 29, 1991	149 days	
Watanabe vacated the title on August 25, 1991 for unknown reasons.
2	(Japan) Tomonori Ohara def. Yoshimasa Ishikawa	Shooto: Shooto; Osaka, Japan	October 17, 1991	? days	1. def. Yomohiro Tanaka on September 25, 1992
Ohara announced his retirement in November 1992 and thus vacated the title.
3	(Japan) Yuki Nakai def. Kazuhiro Kusayanagi	Shooto: Vale Tudo Access 2 Tokyo, Japan	November 7, 1994	? days	
Nakai suffered an eye injury at Vale Tudo Japan 1995 which forced him into retirement in April 1995.
4	(Japan) Caol Uno def. Rumina Sato	Shooto: 10th Anniversary Event; Yokohama, Japan	May 29, 1999	568 days	1. def. Rumina Sato on December 17, 2000
Uno vacated the title on December 17, 2000 to compete in the UFC.
5	(Japan) Takanori Gomi def. Rumina Sato	Shooto: To The Top Final Act; Urayasu, Japan	December 16, 2001	602 days	1. def. Dokonjonosuke Mishima on December 14, 2002
6	(Norway) Joachim Hansen	Shooto: 8/10 in Yokohama Cultural Gymnasium; Yokohama, Japan	August 10, 2003	126 days	
7	(Brazil) Vítor Ribeiro	Shooto: Year End Show 2003; Urayasu, Japan	December 14, 2003	366 days	
8	(Japan) Tatsuya Kawajiri	Shooto: Year End Show 2004; Tokyo, Japan	December 14, 2004	770 days	1. def. Joachim Hansen on February 17, 2006
Kawajiri vacated the title on January 23, 2007, after suffering a knee injury which prevented him from defending his title in the mandatory time period per Shooto regulations.
9	(Japan) Takashi Nakakura def. Ganjo Tentsuku	Shooto: Shooto Tradition 1 Tokyo, Japan	May 3, 2008	506 days	
Nakakura vacated the title on September 21, 2009, declaring that he wasn't ready to properly defend it after losing a non-title fight to Takanori Gomi.
10	(Brazil) Willamy Freire def. Kenichiro Togashi	Vale Tudo Japan 2009; Tokyo, Japan	October 30, 2009	212 days	1. def. Yusuke Endo on May 30, 2010
Freire vacated the title on May 30, 2010 to compete in the UFC.
11	(Japan) Kuniyoshi Hironaka def. Kotetsu Boku	Shooto: Shootor's Legacy 3 Tokyo, Japan	July 18, 2011	1,595 days	1. def. Giovani Diniz on May 18, 2012; 2. def. Yoshihiro Koyama on September 29, 2013
Hironaka vacated the title on November 29, 2015 for unknown reasons.
12	(Japan) Koshi Matsumoto def. Yuki Kawana	Mobstyles Present Fight & Mosh; Tokyo, Japan	April 23, 2016	1,394 days	1. def. Yuki Okano on March 25, 2018; 2. def. Naoyuki Kotani on May 6, 2019
Matsumoto vacated the title in February 16, 2020, when he signed with ONE Championship.
13	(Japan) Yuki Kawana def. Captain Africa	Professional Shooto 2020 Vol.4 in Osaka; Osaka, Japan	July 12, 2020	435 days	
14	(Japan) Yamato Nishikawa def. Yuki Kawana	Professional Shooto 2021 Vol.6; Tokyo, Japan	September 20, 2021	998 days	
Kawana vacated the title on June 14, 2024.
15	(Japan) Shutaro Debana def. Nobumitsu Osawa	Shooto 2024 Vol.6; Osaka, Japan	July 28, 2024	609 days	
16	(Japan) Yuji Ephoeviga def. Shutaro Debana	Professional Shooto 2026 Vol.2; Tokyo, Japan	March 29, 2026	132 days (incumbent)	

=== Featherweight Championship ===
Weight limit of 65.8 kg (145 lb)
The weight limit was 65 kg (143.3 lb) prior to January 1, 2015. The Featherweight Championship was known as the Lightweight Championship prior to January 1, 2017.

No.	Name	Event	Date	Reign (total)	Defenses
1	(Japan) Kenichi Tanaka def. Kazuhiro Sakamoto	Shooto: Shooto; Tokyo, Japan	September 8, 1990	265 days	
2	(Japan) Kazuhiro Sakamoto	Shooto: Shooto; Tokyo, Japan	May 31, 1991	301 days	1. def. Hiroyuki Kanno on October 17, 1991
3	(Japan) Noboru Asahi	Shooto: Shooto; Tokyo, Japan	March 27, 1992	2,718 days	1. drew with Kenichi Tanaka on July 23, 1992; 2. drew with Uchu Tatsumi on March 28, 1999
4	(Brazil) Alexandre Franca Nogueira	Shooto: Renaxis 4 Tokyo, Japan	September 5, 1999	2,436 days	1. def. Uchu Tatsumi on August 27, 2000; 2. def. Tetsuo Katsuta on September 2, 2001; 3. def. Katsuya Toida on December 16, 2001; 4. def. Hiroyuki Abe on December 14, 2002; 5. drew with Stephen Palling on August 10, 2003; 6. def. João Roque on March 11, 2005
Nogueira vacated the title on May 7, 2006, after suffering a knee injury which prevented him from defending his title in the mandatory time period per Shooto regulations.
5	(Japan) Lion Takeshi def. Antonio Carvalho	Shooto: The Devilock; Tokyo, Japan	May 12, 2006	371 days	
6	(Japan) Akitoshi Tamura	Shooto: Back To Our Roots 3 Tokyo, Japan	May 18, 2007	315 days	
7	(Japan) Hideki Kadowaki	Shooto: Back To Our Roots 8 Tokyo, Japan	March 28, 2008	246 days	
8	(Japan) Lion Takeshi (2)	Shooto: Shooto Tradition 4 Tokyo, Japan	November 29, 2008	547 days (918 days)	1. def. Rumina Sato on May 10, 2009
9	(Japan) Hatsu Hioki	Shooto: The Way of Shooto 3: Like a Tiger, Like a Dragon; Tokyo, Japan	May 30, 2010	366 days	
Hioki vacated the title on May 31, 2011 to compete in the UFC.
10	(Japan) Yutaka Saito def. Yoshifumi Nakamura	Professional Shooto; Tokyo, Japan	January 11, 2016	1,906 days	1. def. Caol Uno on April 23, 2017
Saito vacated the title on March 31, 2021 to compete in Rizin.
11	(Japan) Sasuke def. Ryoji Kudo	Professional Shooto 2021 Vol.5; Tokyo, Japan	July 25, 2021	1,840 days (incumbent)	1. def. Tateo Iida on March 19, 2023; 2. def. Hiroshige Tanaka on December 2, 2023; 3. def. Asuka Tsubaki on March 16, 2025

=== Bantamweight Championship ===
Weight limit of 61.2 kg (135 lb)
The weight limit was 60 kg (132.3 lb) prior to January 1, 2015. The Bantamweight Championship was known as the Featherweight Championship prior to January 1, 2017.

No.	Name	Event	Date	Reign (total)	Defenses
1	(Japan) Mamoru Yamaguchi def. Jin Akimoto	Shooto: R.E.A.D. Final; Urayasu, Japan	December 17, 2000	343 days	
2	(Japan) Masahiro Oishi	Shooto: To The Top 10; Tokyo, Japan	November 25, 2001	623 days	1. drew with Hisao Ikeda on September 16, 2002
3	(Japan) Ryota Matsune	Shooto: 8/10 in Yokohama Cultural Gymnasium; Yokohama, Japan	August 10, 2003	858 days	1. def. Kentaro Imaizumi on November 12, 2004
Matsune vacated the title on December 15, 2005, after suffering a knee injury which prevented him from defending his title in the mandatory time period per Shooto regulations.
4	(Japan) Akitoshi Hokazono def. Kenji Osawa	Shooto 2006: 7/21 in Korakuen Hall; Tokyo, Japan	July 21, 2006	554 days	
Hokazono vacated the title on January 26, 2008, when he retired.
5	(Japan) Masakatsu Ueda def. Koetsu Okazaki	Shooto: Back To Our Roots 8 Tokyo, Japan	March 28, 2008	724 days	1. drew with Marcos Galvao on September 28, 2008; 2. def. So Tazawa on March 20, 2009; 3. def. Eduardo Dantas on July 19, 2009
6	(Japan) Shuichiro Katsumura	Shooto: The Way of Shooto 2: Like a Tiger, Like a Dragon; Tokyo, Japan	March 22, 2010	403 days	
7	(Japan) Koetsu Okazaki	Shooto: Shooto Tradition 2011; Tokyo, Japan	April 29, 2011	385 days	
8	(Japan) Hiromasa Ougikubo	Great East Japan Earthquake Reconstruction Support Charity; Tokyo, Japan	May 18, 2012	302 days	
9	(Japan) Kyoji Horiguchi	Shooto: 2013 2nd Round; Tokyo, Japan	March 16, 2013	948 days	1. def. Shintaro Ishiwatari on June 22, 2013
Horiguchi vacated the title on October 20, 2015 to compete in the UFC.
10	(Japan) Shoko Sato def. Keita Ishibashi	Professional Shooto; Urayasu, Japan	October 15, 2017	1,142 days	1. def. Tristan Grimsley on July 15, 2018; 2. def. Yo Saito on November 17, 2018
—	(Japan) Ryo Okada def. Kazuma Kuramoto for interim title	Professional Shooto 2020 Vol.3; Tokyo, Japan	May 31, 2020	—	
Sato vacated the title on November 30, 2020, in order to compete with ONE Championship.
11	(Japan) Ryo Okada promoted to undisputed champion	—	November 30, 2020	476 days	1. def. Takafumi Otsuka on March 20, 2021
12	(Japan) Tatsuya Ando def. Ryo Okada	Professional Shooto 2022 Vol.2; Tokyo, Japan	March 21, 2022	813 days	
Ando vacated the title on June 11, 2024.
13	(Japan) Shoji Saito def. Nobuki Fujii	Shooto 2024 Vol.5; Tokyo, Japan	July 21, 2024	427 days	
—	(Japan) Kanata Nagai def. Daiki Tsubota for interim title	Shooto 2025 Vol.5; Tokyo, Japan	May 25, 2025	—	
14	(Japan) Kanata Nagai def. Shoji Saito	Shooto 2025 Vol.8; Tokyo, Japan	September 21, 2025	321 days (incumbent)	

=== Flyweight Championship ===
Weight limit of 56.7 kg (125 lb)
The weight limit was 56 kg (123.5 lb) prior to January 1, 2015. The Flyweight Championship was known as the Bantamweight Championship prior to January 1, 2017.

No.	Name	Date	Defenses
1	(Japan) Mamoru Yamaguchi def. Yasuhiro Urushitani	December 14, 2003	1. drew with Robson Moura on September 26, 2004; 2. drew with Shinichi Kojima on March 24, 2006
2	(Japan) Shinichi Kojima	October 14, 2006	1. drew with Yasuhiro Urushitani on March 16, 2007; 2. def. Mamoru Yamaguchi on July 18, 2008; 3. def. Yuki Shoujou on March 20, 2009
Kojima vacated the title on February 27, 2010 after suffering an ACL injury in his right knee which prevented him from defending his title in the mandatory time period per Shooto regulations.
3	(Japan) Yasuhiro Urushitani def. Ryuichi Miki	May 30, 2010	1. def. Yuki Shoujou on July 18, 2011
Urushitani vacated the title on December 10, 2011 to compete in the UFC.
Ryuichi Miki drew with Yosuke Saruta for the vacant title on July 27, 2013.
4	(Japan) Ryuichi Miki def. Yosuke Saruta	November 9, 2013	
5	(Japan) Masaaki Sugawara	May 3, 2015	
6	(Japan) Hiromasa Ougikubo	April 23, 2016	1. def. Tadaaki Yamamoto on October 15, 2017; 2. def. Kiyotaka Shimizu on May 6, 2019
—	(Japan) Ryuya Fukuda def. Yoshiro Maeda for the interim title.	July 12, 2020	
Ougikubo vacated the title on January 31, 2021. Fukuda was promoted to undisputed status.
7	(Japan) Ryuya Fukuda promoted to undisputed champion	January 31, 2021	
8	(Japan) Tatsuro Taira	July 3, 2021	
Taira vacated the title on May 21, 2023 to compete for the UFC.
9	(Japan) Jo Arai def. Wataru Yamauchi	November 19, 2023	
—	(Japan) Yuto Sekiguchi def. Shuto Aki for the interim title.	January 19, 2025	
Arai vacated the title on May 18, 2025. Sekiguchi was promoted to undisputed status.
10	(Japan) Yuto Sekiguchi promoted to undisputed champion	May 18, 2025	
11	(Japan) Ryoga Arimoto def. Yuto Sekiguchi	November 16, 2025	

=== Strawweight Championship ===
Weight limit of 52.2 kg (115 lb)
The weight limit was 52 kg (114.6 lb) prior to January 1, 2015. The Strawweight Championship was known as the Flyweight Championship prior to January 1, 2017.

No.	Name	Date	Defenses
1	(Thailand) Rambaa Somdet def. Noboru Tahara	November 23, 2009	1. def. Hiroyuki Abe on July 19, 2010
Somdet vacated the title on April 16, 2011 due to a partially torn left bicep.
2	(Japan) Junji Ikoma def. Junji Sarumaru	April 29, 2011	
3	(Japan) Mikihito Yamagami	November 5, 2011	1. def. Junji Sarumaru on September 30, 2012
Yamagami vacated the title in December 2013 when he moved up in weight.
4	(Japan) Shinya Murofushi def. Junji Sarumaru	January 13, 2014	
5	(Japan) Yoshitaka Naito	September 27, 2014	1. def. Ryuta Sawada on July 26, 2015; 2. def. Junji Sarumaru on November 29, 2015
Naito vacated the title on April 7, 2016 when he signed with ONE Championship.
6	(Japan) Ryohei Kurosawa def. Ryuto Sawada	July 17, 2016	
Kurosawa vacated the title in 2017.
7	(Japan) Yosuke Saruta def. Ryuto Sawada	October 15, 2017	1. def. Itchaku Murata on May 13, 2018
Saruta vacated the title on November 30, 2019, after signing with ONE Championship.
8	(Japan) Hiroshi Minowa def. Yohei Komaki	January 26, 2020	
—	(Japan) Junji Sarumaru def. Ryohei Kurosawa for the interim title	November 7, 2021	
Sarumaru was promoted to undisputed champion status on August 1, 2022, after Minowa vacated the title.
9	(Japan) Junji Sarumaru promoted to undisputed champion	August 1, 2022	
10	(Japan) Jo Arai def. Junji Sarumaru	September 19, 2022	1. def. Shuto Aki on July 23, 2023
Arai vacated the title on December 2, 2024, after moving up to flyweight.
11	(Japan) Koyuru Tanoue def. Ken Asahina	December 29, 2024	1. def. Mikihito Yamagami on September 20, 2025; 2. def. Kazusa Kurobe on May 31, 2026

== Women's championship history ==
=== Women's Strawweight Championship ===
Weight limit of 52.2 kg (115 lb)

No.	Name	Event	Date	Reign (total)	Defenses
1	(Japan) Emi Fujino def. Megumi Sugimoto	Professional Shooto 2024 Vol.4; Tokyo, Japan	May 18, 2024	812 days (incumbent)	

=== Women's Super Atomweight Championship ===
Weight limit of 49.9 kg (110 lb)

No.	Name	Event	Date	Reign (total)	Defenses
1	(Japan) Mina Kurobe def. Megumi Sugimoto	Professional Shooto 2020 Vol.5; Tokyo, Japan	August 1, 2020	462 days	
2	(Japan) Satomi Takano def. Mina Kurobe	Professional Shooto 2021 Vol.7; Tokyo, Japan	November 6, 2021	561 days	
3	(Japan) Ayaka Watanabe def. Satomi Takano	Professional Shooto 2023 Vol.3; Tokyo, Japan	May 21, 2023	1,175 days (incumbent)	1. def. Chiyo Takamoto on July 20, 2026

=== Women's Atomweight Championship ===
Weight limit of 47.6 kg (105 lb)

No.	Name	Event	Date	Reign (total)	Defenses
1	(Japan) Chihiro Sawada def. Yuki Ono	Professional Shooto 2022 Vol.7; Tokyo, Japan	November 27, 2022	605 days	1. def. Miku Nakamura on December 2, 2023
Sawada vacated her title on July 24, 2024, after signing with ONE Championship.
2	(Japan) Aira Koga def. Zenny Huang	Shooto Colors vol.3 Tokyo, Japan	August 3, 2024	484 days	
Koga vacated her title on November 30, 2025.
3	(Japan) Hikaru Aono def. Miku Nakamura	Professional Shooto 2026 Vol.2; Tokyo, Japan	March 29, 2026	132 days (incumbent)	

== Defunct title ==
=== Heavyweight Championship ===
Weight limit of 120.2 kg (265 lb)
The weight limit was 100 kg (220.5 lb) prior to January 1, 2015.

No.	Name	Event	Date	Reign (total)	Defenses
1	(United States) Enson Inoue def. Joe Estes	Shooto: Reconquista 4 Tokyo, Japan	October 12, 1997	693 days	
Inoue vacated the title on September 5, 1999.

== Records ==
=== Most wins in title bouts ===
The following includes all fighters with four or more championship and/or interim championship title wins.

Title wins	Champion	Division	W	L	D	NC
6	(Brazil) Alexandre Franca Nogueira	Featherweight	6		1	
4	(Japan) Kenji Kawaguchi	Light Heavyweight	4	1		1
4	(Japan) Hiromasa Ougikubo	Featherweight; Bantamweight	1; 3			1
4	(Japan) Sasuke	Featherweight	4			

=== Most consecutive title defenses ===
The following includes all Shooto champions who were able to consecutively defend their title three times or more. Fighters with the same number of title defenses are listed chronologically.

Defenses	Champion	Division	Period
6	(Brazil) Alexandre Franca Nogueira (Note: Nogueira successfully defended the Shooto Lightweight Championship five times and retained the title once following a draw against Stephen Palling at Shooto: 8/10 in Yokohama Cultural Gymnasium.)	Featherweight	September 5, 1999 – May 7, 2006
3	(Japan) Kenji Kawaguchi (Note: Kawaguchi successfully defended the Shooto Light Heavyweight Championship twice and retained the title once following a draw against Satoshi Honma on November 27, 1992.)	Light Heavyweight	May 31, 1991 – May 7, 1996
3	(Japan) BJ (Note: BJ successfully defended the Shooto Bantamweight Championship twice and retained the title once following a draw against Yasuhiro Urushitani at Shooto: Back To Our Roots 2.)	Bantamweight	October 16, 2006 – March 1, 2010
3	(Japan) Masakatsu Ueda (Note: Ueda successfully defended the Shooto Featherweight Championship twice and retained the title once following a draw against Marcos Galvão at)	Featherweight	March 28, 2008 – March 22, 2010
3	(Japan) Sasuke	Featherweight	July 25, 2021 – Present

=== Multi-division champions ===
Fighters who have won championships in multiple weight classes. Tournament champions are not included.

	Interim title
*	Simultaneous two division champion

No.	Champion	Division	Period	Defense
1	(Japan) Mamoru	Featherweight	December 17, 2000 – November 25, 2001	0
1	(Japan) Mamoru	Bantamweight	December 14, 2003 – October 14, 2006	2
2	(Japan) Hiromasa Ougikubo	Featherweight	May 18, 2012 – March 16, 2013	0
2	(Japan) Hiromasa Ougikubo	Bantamweight	April 23, 2016 – January 31, 2021	2
3	(Japan) Jo Arai	Strawweight	September 19, 2022 – December 2, 2024	1
3	(Japan) Jo Arai	Flyweight	November 19, 2023 – May 18, 2025	0

=== By nationality ===
The following include championship title holders by nationality.

Country	Titles
Japan	62
Brazil	6
United States	3
Afghanistan	1
Thailand	1
Norway	1

== See also ==
- List of Shooto Pacific Rim champions
- List of current mixed martial arts champions
- List of Bellator MMA champions
- List of Dream champions
- List of EliteXC champions
- List of Invicta FC champions
- List of ONE Championship champions
- List of Pancrase champions
- List of Pride champions
- List of PFL champions
- List of Strikeforce champions
- List of UFC champions
- List of WEC champions
- Mixed martial arts weight classes
