= Kenji Kawaguchi =

Japanese mixed martial artist

Kenji Kawaguchi 川口健次
- Born: Kenji Kawaguchi; Kawasaki, Kanagawa, Japan
- Nationality: Japanese
- Height: 5 ft 8 in (1.73 m)
- Weight: 172 lb (78 kg; 12.3 st)
- Division: Heavyweight; Middleweight; Welterweight
- Team: Shooting Gym Yokohama
- Years active: 1989–2006, 2015

Mixed martial arts record
- Total: 25
- Wins: 14
- By knockout: 3
- By submission: 10
- By decision: 1
- Losses: 7
- By knockout: 3
- By submission: 4
- Draws: 4

Other information
- Mixed martial arts record from Sherdog

Kenji Kawaguchi (川口健次, Kawaguchi Kenji)) is a Japanese mixed martial artist. He competed in the Welterweight division.

== Career ==
=== Vale Tudo Japan ===
After a 10–0–4 career in Shooto, Kawaguchi represented the promotion in the event Vale Tudo Japan in July 1994, where he was pitted against French karateka Jan Lomulder. Kawaguchi charged for a takedown, but Lomulder kept himself standing by grabbing the ring ropes and scored multiple strikes on the back of Kawaguchi's head, both being legal tactics under that ruleset. Kawaguchi eventually took him down, only for Lomulder to answer with rabbit punches that forced the wrestler out of the ring. A controversial moment happened when Kawaguchi tried to return to the ring, as the referee didn't stop the action, meaning Lomulder could freely score soccer kicks and stomps while he did so.

The Shooto wrestler repeated the takedown, but Lomulder grabbed the ropes again and landed multiple elbow strikes to the back of the head, and then followed with and more soccer kicks and stomps. After a restart, Kawaguchi tried to come back with a kneebar, but Lomulder blocked the technique and landed a heavy kick on the face, leading the referee to stop the match.

Kawaguchi returned to Vale Tudo Japan in 1995, where he submitted American fighter Tommy Walkingstick via armbar.

Three years after their first encounter in Vale Tudo Japan, Lomulder and Kawaguchi rematched in the Vale Tudo Japan edition of 1997. This time, the match lasted three rounds, and it saw the Japanese shoot wrestler eventually taking Lomulder down and executing a rear naked choke for the victory.

Kawaguchi's last VTJ appearance was in 1998, when he fought Russian mixed martial artist Vladimir Matyushenko and lost by KO.

== Championships and accomplishments ==
- Shooto
  - Shooto Light Heavyweight Championship (One time)
    - Four successful title defenses

== Mixed martial arts record ==
Professional record breakdown
25 matches	14 wins	7 losses
By knockout	3	3
By submission	10	4
By decision	1	0
Draws	4	

Res.	Record	Opponent	Method	Event	Date	Round	Time	Location	Notes
Loss	14–7–4	Yuki Kondo	KO (punch)	Pancrase: 271	November 1, 2015	1	3:52	Tokyo, Japan	Open Weight bout.
Win	14–6–4	Deividas Petrauskas	TKO (punches)	Shooto: The Devilock	May 12, 2006	1	2:05	Tokyo, Japan	
Loss	13–6–4	Carlos Newton	Submission (armbar)	Shooto - 10th Anniversary Event	May 29, 1999	1	5:00	Yokohama, Kanagawa, Japan	
Loss	13–5–4	Vladimir Matyushenko	KO (punches)	Vale Tudo Japan 1998	October 25, 1998	1	3:10	Urayasu, Chiba, Japan	
Win	13–4–4	Ante Jurisic	Submission (heel hook)	Shooto - Las Grandes Viajes 4	July 29, 1998	2	0:35	Tokyo, Japan	
Loss	12–4–4	Masanori Suda	Submission (armbar)	Shooto - Las Grandes Viajes 2	March 1, 1998	3	1:08	Tokyo, Japan	
Win	12–3–4	Jan Lomulder	Submission (rear-naked choke)	Vale Tudo Japan 1997	November 29, 1997	3	3:49	Urayasu, Chiba, Japan	
Loss	11–3–4	Erik Paulson	Submission (toe hold)	Shooto - Vale Tudo Junction 3	May 7, 1996	3	1:23	Tokyo, Japan	
Win	11–2–4	Tommy Walkingstick	Submission (armbar)	Vale Tudo Japan 1995	April 20, 1995	1	6:29	Tokyo, Japan	
Loss	10–2–4	Erik Paulson	Technical Submission (armbar)	Shooto - Vale Tudo Access 2	November 7, 1994	2	1:03	Tokyo, Japan	
Loss	10–1–4	Jan Lomulder	TKO (soccer kick)	Vale Tudo Japan 1994	July 29, 1994	1	2:59	Urayasu, Chiba, Japan	
Win	10–0–4	Yasunori Okuda	Submission (guillotine choke)	Shooto - Shooto	May 6, 1994	1	2:55	Tokyo, Japan	
Win	9–0–4	Tomokazu Fukaya	Submission (kneebar)	Shooto - Shooto	March 18, 1994	1	0:32	Tokyo, Japan	
Draw	8–0–4	Satoshi Honma	Draw	Shooto - Shooto	November 27, 1992	5	3:00	Tokyo, Japan	
Win	8–0–3	Manabu Yamada	Submission (kneebar)	Shooto - Shooto	July 23, 1992	1	0:36	Tokyo, Japan	
Win	7–0–3	Satoshi Honma	Decision (unanimous)	Shooto - Shooto	October 17, 1991	5	3:00	Osaka, Japan	
Draw	6–0–3	Kazuhiro Kusayanagi	Draw	Shooto - Shooto	August 25, 1991	5	3:00	Tokyo, Japan	
Win	6–0–2	Manabu Yamada	Submission (kneebar)	Shooto - Shooto	May 31, 1991	1	0:58	Tokyo, Japan	
Win	5–0–2	Naoki Sakurada	Submission (guillotine choke)	Shooto - Shooto	January 13, 1991	1	0:00	Tokyo, Japan	
Win	4–0–2	Yuji Ito	KO (punches)	Shooto - Shooto	November 28, 1990	3	0:37	Tokyo, Japan	
Draw	3–0–2	Yasuto Sekishima	Draw	Shooto - Shooto	March 17, 1990	5	3:00	Tokyo, Japan	
Win	3–0–1	Naoki Sakurada	TKO (punches)	Shooto - Shooto	January 13, 1990	4	1:29	Tokyo, Japan	
Win	2–0–1	Mitsuo Fujikura	Submission (armbar)	Shooto - Shooto	October 19, 1989	2	0:41	Tokyo, Japan	
Draw	1–0–1	Yuji Ito	Draw	Shooto - Shooto	July 29, 1989	4	3:00	Tokyo, Japan	
Win	1–0	Tadashi Yokoyama	Submission (kneebar)	Shooto - Shooto	May 18, 1989	1	0:00	Tokyo, Japan	

== See also ==
- List of male mixed martial artists
