= Jo Arai =

Japanese mixed martial artist (born 1998)

- Born: February 10, 1998 (age 28); Setagaya, Tokyo, Japan
- Native name: 新井 丈
- Nationality: Japanese
- Height: 5 ft 4 in (1.63 m)
- Weight: 125 lb (57 kg)
- Division: Strawweight; Flyweight
- Fighting out of: Setagaya, Tokyo, Japan
- Team: Kingdom Tachikawa; Wajutsu Keishukai Hearts
- Years active: 2016-present

Mixed martial arts record
- Total: 29
- Wins: 15
- By knockout: 10
- By submission: 1
- By decision: 4
- Losses: 13
- By knockout: 5
- By submission: 8
- By decision: 0
- Draws: 1

Other information
- Mixed martial arts record from Sherdog

Jo Arai (Japanese: 新井 丈, Hepburn: Arai Jō; born February 10, 1998) is a Japanese mixed martial artist who competes in Shooto and Rizin. He is a former Shooto Flyweight Champion and Strawweight Champion.

== Mixed martial arts career ==
=== Shooto ===
In his MMA debut, Arai faced Ryosuke Ogawa at Professional Shooto 3/21 on March 21, 2016. The match ended in a draw.

Arai faced Takamasa Kiuchi at Professional Shooto 2022 Vol. 1 on January 16, 2022. He won the bout by first-round knockout.

Arai faced Ryohei Kurosawa at Professional Shooto 2022 Vol. 3 on May 22, 2022. He won the bout by technical knockout via doctor stoppage in the second round.

==== Strawweight and Flyweight champion ====
Arai faced Junji Ito for the Shooto Strawweight Championship at Professional Shooto 2022 vol. 6 on September 19, 2022. He won the fight by a first-round knockout to win the title.

Arai faced Yo Otake at Professional Shooto 2022 Vol. 7 on November 27, 2022. He won the bout via first-round knockout.

Arai face Yuto Sekiguchi at Professional Shooto 2023 Vol. 2 on March 19, 2023. He won the bout by unanimous decision.

In his first strawweight title defense, Arai faced No. 1 ranked strawweight Shuto Aki on July 23, 2023, at Professional Shooto 2023 Vol.5. He defended the title by knockout in the 1st round. In October 2023, he reached No. 1 in the strawweight rankings according to Fight Matrix.

Arai faced Wataru Yamauchi for the vacant Shooto Flyweight Championship on November 19, 2023, at Professional Shooto 2023 Vol.7. He won the bout by technical knockout in the third round to win the title.

Arai vacated the Shooto strawweight title on November 30, 2024, after moving up to flyweight.

Arai was scheduled to face interim champion Yuto Sekiguchi in a Shooto Flyweight Championship unification bout at Professional Shooto 2025 Vol. 3 on May 18, 2025. However, he was forced to withdraw due to a right hamstring injury and a hematoma in his right hamstring, and relinquished his flyweight title and that Sekiguchi was promoted as undisputed flyweight champion as a result.

==== Post-title reign ====
Arai faced Koyuru Tanoue on November 16, 2025, at Shooto 2025 Vol.9. He won the bout by unanimous decision.

=== Rizin FF ===
Making his Rizin debut, Arai faced Hiroya Kondo on December 31, 2023 at Rizin 45. He lost the bout in the second round via TKO stoppage.

Arai faced Nkazimulo Zulu on September 29, 2024 at Rizin 48. He lost the bout via TKO in the first round.

Arai faced Lee Jung-hyun on March 7, 2026 at Rizin 52. He lost the bout by TKO in the first round.

== Championships and accomplishments ==
- Shooto
  - Shooto Flyweight Championship (One time)
  - Shooto Strawweight Championship (One time)
  - First simultaneous two-weight Champion in Shooto history

== Mixed martial arts record ==
Professional record breakdown
29 matches	15 wins	13 losses
By knockout	10	5
By submission	1	8
By decision	4	0
Draws	1	

Res.	Record	Opponent	Method	Event	Date	Round	Time	Location	Notes
Win	15–13–1	Daichi Kitakata	KO (punch)	DEEP 133 Impact	September 13, 2026	1	1:42	Tokyo, Japan	Return to Strawweight.
Loss	14–13–1	Lee Jung-hyun	TKO (knees and punches)	Rizin 52	March 7, 2026	3	3:44	Tokyo, Japan	
Win	14–12–1	Koyuru Tanoue	Decision (unanimous)	Shooto 2025 Vol.9	November 16, 2025	3	5:00	Tokyo, Japan	
Loss	13–12–1	Nkazimulo Zulu	TKO (spinning wheel kick and punches)	Rizin 48	September 29, 2024	1	4:12	Saitama, Japan	
Loss	13–11–1	Hiroya Kondo	TKO (head kick and punches)	Rizin 45	December 31, 2023	2	2:53	Saitama, Japan	
Win	13–10–1	Wataru Yamauchi	TKO (punches)	Shooto 2023 Vol.7	November 19, 2023	3	2:55	Tokyo, Japan	Won the vacant Shooto Flyweight Championship.
Win	12–10–1	Shuto Aki	TKO (punches)	Shooto 2023 Vol.5	July 23, 2023	1	4:41	Tokyo, Japan	Defended the Shooto Strawweight Championship.
Win	11–10–1	Yuto Sekiguchi	Decision (unanimous)	Shooto 2023 Vol.2	March 19, 2023	3	5:00	Tokyo, Japan	
Win	10–10–1	Yo Otake	KO (punches)	Shooto 2022 Vol.7	November 27, 2022	1	4:10	Tokyo, Japan	Return to Flyweight.
Win	9–10–1	Junji Ito	TKO (punch)	Shooto 2022 Vol.6	September 19, 2022	1	1:50	Tokyo, Japan	Won the Shooto Strawweight Championship.
Win	8–10–1	Ryohei Kurosawa	TKO (doctor stoppage)	Shooto 2022 Vol. 3	May 22, 2022	2	2:12	Tokyo, Japan	
Win	7–10–1	Takamasa Kiuchi	KO (punch)	Shooto 2022 Opening Round	January 16, 2022	1	4:46	Tokyo, Japan	
Win	6–10–1	Tateo Iino	KO (punch)	Shooto: Gig Tokyo Vol.30	June 26, 2021	1	0:59	Tokyo, Japan	
Win	5–10–1	Yuya Tsumura	Decision (unanimous)	Shooto 2020 Vol. 7	November 23, 2020	2	5:00	Tokyo, Japan	Flyweight bout.
Win	4–10–1	Atsushi Makigaya	Decision (unanimous)	MOBSTYLES 20th Anniversary Tour: Fight＆Mosh Vol.2	March 21, 2020	2	5:00	Tokyo, Japan	
Win	3–10–1	Yo Otake	KO (punch)	Shooto: Gig Tokyo Vol.28	October 20, 2019	2	2:21	Tokyo, Japan	Flyweight bout.
Loss	2–10–1	Takeru Uchida	Submission (rear-naked choke)	Shooto 30th Anniversary Tour 6th Round	July 15, 2019	2	1:52	Tokyo, Japan	
Win	2–9–1	Simon Tse	Submission (rear-naked choke)	KROSSxOVER 5	February 24, 2019	1	4:57	Saitama, Japan	
Loss	1–9–1	Tomoharu Umezawa	Submission (arm-triangle choke)	Shooto Infinity League 2018 Finals	December 15, 2018	2	4:51	Tokyo, Japan	
Loss	1–8–1	Yohei Komaki	Submission (rear-naked choke)	Professional Shooto 7/15	July 15, 2018	1	1:15	Tokyo, Japan	
Loss	1–7–1	Sho Nishida	Submission (triangle choke)	Shooto: Gig Tokyo 25	April 22, 2018	1	4:02	Tokyo, Japan	
Loss	1–6–1	Koha Minowa	Submission (rear-naked choke)	Shooto Korakuen Hall 3/25	March 25, 2018	2	0:45	Tokyo, Japan	
Loss	1–5–1	Qing Wang	Submission (guillotine choke)	WLF W.A.R.S. 18	October 28, 2017	1	4:05	Barkam, China	
Loss	1–4–1	Atsushi Makigaya	Submission (armbar)	Tachikawa Kakutogi Fest: Summer 2017	June 18, 2017	2	4:00	Tokyo, Japan	
Loss	1–3–1	Tomoaki Ota	TKO (punches)	This Is Shooto, Vol. 1	February 24, 2017	2	4:00	Tokyo, Japan	Return to Strawweight.
Loss	1–2–1	Satoru Date	TKO (punches)	CMA x Kingdom Ehrgeiz: In Tachikawa Colosseum Voltage 1	October 15, 2016	2	N/A	Tokyo, Japan	Flyweight debut.
Loss	1–1–1	Gexi Sanlanggexi	Submission (rear-naked choke)	WLF E.P.I.C.: Elevation Power in Cage 8	September 28, 2016	2	3:35	Zhengzhou, China	
Win	1–0–1	Tomoharu Umezawa	KO (punches)	Gig Tokyo 21	May 28, 2016	2	0:24	Tokyo, Japan	
Draw	0–0–1	Ryosuke Ogawa	Draw (majority)	Professional Shooto 3/21	March 21, 2016	2	5:00	Tokyo, Japan	Strawweight debut.
