= Tomonori Ohara =

Japanese mixed martial artist

Tomonori Ohara 大原友則
- Born: Japan
- Nationality: Japanese
- Weight: 167 lb (76 kg; 11.9 st)
- Division: Lightweight; Welterweight
- Style: Shoot wrestling, Shoot boxing, Shooto, Catch Wrestling
- Team: Shooting Gym Tokai
- Years active: 1990 - 2005

Mixed martial arts record
- Total: 18
- Wins: 5
- By knockout: 4
- By decision: 1
- Losses: 12
- By knockout: 2
- By submission: 6
- By decision: 3
- Unknown: 1
- Draws: 1

Other information
- Mixed martial arts record from Sherdog

Tomonori Ohara Japanese: 大原友則 is a Japanese mixed martial artist. He competed in the Lightweight and Welterweight divisions.

== Mixed martial arts record ==
Professional record breakdown
18 matches	5 wins	12 losses
By knockout	4	2
By submission	0	6
By decision	1	3
Unknown	0	1
Draws	1	

Res.	Record	Opponent	Method	Event	Date	Round	Time	Location	Notes
Loss	5–12–1	Naoki Kimura	TKO (punches)	Deep - Hero 1	April 17, 2005	1	2:15	Nagoya, Aichi, Japan	
Loss	5–11–1	Yasuyuki Tokuoka	Technical Submission (armbar)	Shooto - To The Top 7	August 26, 2001	1	2:37	Osaka, Japan	
Loss	5–10–1	Takayuki Okochi	Decision (unanimous)	Shooto - Gig East 2	May 22, 2001	2	5:00	Tokyo, Japan	
Loss	5–9–1	Hiroshi Tsuruya	Submission (kimura)	Shooto - R.E.A.D. 6	July 16, 2000	1	0:50	Tokyo, Japan	
Loss	5–8–1	Saburo Kawakatsu	Submission (armbar)	Shooto - R.E.A.D. 3	April 2, 2000	1	2:26	Kadoma, Osaka, Japan	
Loss	5–7–1	Yuji Ito	Decision (unanimous)	Shooto - Shooto	November 27, 1992	5	3:00	Tokyo, Japan	
Win	5–6–1	Tomohiro Tanaka	TKO (punches)	Shooto - Shooto	September 25, 1992	1	2:03	Tokyo, Japan	
Loss	4–6–1	Yoshimasa Ishikawa	N/A	Shooto - Shooto	May 29, 1992	3	0:54	Tokyo, Japan	
Loss	4–5–1	Yuichi Watanabe	Submission (kneebar)	Shooto - Shooto	March 27, 1992	1	0:00	Tokyo, Japan	
Win	4–4–1	Yoshimasa Ishikawa	TKO (broken hand)	Shooto - Shooto	October 17, 1991	2	2:35	Osaka, Japan	
Draw	3–4–1	Takashi Tojo	Draw	Shooto - Shooto	August 25, 1991	4	3:00	Tokyo, Japan	
Loss	3–4	Naoki Sakurada	Submission (armbar)	Shooto - Shooto	May 31, 1991	5	0:00	Tokyo, Japan	
Loss	3–3	Yoshimasa Ishikawa	Submission (guillotine choke)	Shooto - Shooto	March 29, 1991	4	0:00	Tokyo, Japan	
Loss	3–2	Yuichi Watanabe	Decision (unanimous)	Shooto - Shooto	January 13, 1991	5	3:00	Tokyo, Japan	
Win	3–1	Kazuhiro Kusayanagi	KO (punch)	Shooto - Shooto	November 28, 1990	4	0:58	Tokyo, Japan	
Loss	2–1	Manabu Yamada	KO (punch)	Shooto - Shooto	July 7, 1990	1	0:00	Tokyo, Japan	
Win	2–0	Suguru Shigeno	Decision (unanimous)	Shooto - Shooto	May 12, 1990	3	3:00	Tokyo, Japan	
Win	1–0	Kengo Tsuchida	TKO (punches)	Shooto - Shooto	January 13, 1990	3	0:16	Tokyo, Japan	

== See also ==
- List of male mixed martial artists
