= Satoshi Honma =

Japanese mixed martial arts fighter

- Born: May 19, 1968 (age 58); Niigata, Japan
- Nationality: Japanese
- Weight: 204 lb (93 kg; 14.6 st)
- Division: Light Heavyweight
- Style: Shooto
- Years active: 1990-2004

Mixed martial arts record
- Total: 16
- Wins: 7
- By knockout: 2
- By submission: 4
- By decision: 1
- Losses: 6
- By knockout: 2
- By submission: 2
- By decision: 2
- Draws: 3

Other information
- Mixed martial arts record from Sherdog

Satoshi Honma (Japanese: 本間 聡, Honma Satoshi) (born May 19, 1968) is a Japanese former mixed martial artist who competed in the light heavyweight division. He has fought for Shooto, Fighting Network RINGS, K-1, Pride Fighting Championships and the UFC.

== Career ==
Honma had his first mixed martial arts fight on May 12, 1990, competing for the Shooto organisation in Japan. Honma compiled a record 3-3-2 in Shooto, including a victory over Manabu Yamada. He lost to Rene Rooze in his K-1 debut in 1995. On October 11, 1998, Honma made his Pride FC debut at Pride 4. Honma beat Naoki Sano by TKO. On June 6, 1999, Honma beat Waine Turner in a kickboxing match at K-1 Survival '99. Honma would go on to lose at Pride 5 to Francisco Bueno by TKO. On April 14, 2000, Honma lost to Ron Waterman by decision at UFC 25. His final career fight was on July 4, 2004, against Ken Orihashi; the fight ended in a draw.

== Mixed martial arts record ==
Professional record breakdown
13 matches	4 wins	6 losses
By knockout	1	2
By submission	3	2
By decision	0	2
By disqualification	0	0
Unknown	0	0
Draws	3	
No contests	0	

Res.	Record	Opponent	Method	Event	Date	Round	Time	Location	Notes
Draw	4–6–3	Ken Orihashi	Decision (unanimous)	ZST - Battle Hazard 01	July 4, 2004	1	5:00	Tokyo, Japan	
Loss	4–6–2	Ron Waterman	Decision (unanimous)	UFC 25	April 14, 2000	3	5:00	Yoyogi, Japan	
Loss	4–5–2	Francisco Bueno	TKO (strikes)	Pride 5	April 29, 1999	1	4:59	Nagoya, Japan	
Win	4–4–2	Naoki Sano	TKO (strikes)	Pride 4	October 11, 1998	1	9:25	Tokyo, Japan	
Loss	3–4–2	Rene Rooze	TKO (referee stoppage)	K-1 Hercules	December 9, 1995	1	2:48	Nagoya, Japan	
Draw	3–3–2	Kenji Kawaguchi	Draw	Shooto - Shooto	November 27, 1992	5	3:00	Tokyo, Japan	Kawaguchi fought to a draw with Honma to remain the Shooto Middleweight Champion.
Loss	3–3–1	Manabu Yamada	Submission (armbar)	Shooto - Shooto	March 27, 1992	3	n/a	Tokyo, Japan	
Loss	3–2–1	Kenji Kawaguchi	Decision	Shooto - Shooto	October 17, 1991	5	3:00	Osaka, Japan	Kawaguchi defeated Honma to remain the Shooto Middleweight Champion.
Win	3–1–1	Manabu Yamada	Submission (armbar)	Shooto - Shooto	August 3, 1991	4	n/a	Tokyo, Japan	
Win	2–1–1	Yoshimasa Ishikawa	Submission (armbar)	Shooto - Shooto	May 31, 1991	2	n/a	Tokyo, Japan	
Draw	1–1–1	Takashi Tojo	Draw	Shooto - Shooto	November 28, 1990	1	n/a	Tokyo, Japan	
Loss	1-1	Kazuhiro Kusayanagi	Submission (triangle choke)	Shooto - Shooto	September 8, 1990	1	1:17	Tokyo, Japan	
Win	1–0	Yutaka Fuji	Submission (armbar)	Shooto - Shooto	May 12, 1990	2	2:36	Tokyo, Japan	

== Kickboxing record ==
Win	1-0	(England) Waine Turner	TKO (3 Knockdowns)	K-1 Survival '99	June 6/1999	3	1:34	Sapporo, Japan
