= 1992 in Shooto =

Mixed martial arts events

Information
- First date: March 27, 1992
- Last date: November 27, 1992

Events
- Total events: 5

Fights
- Total fights: 32
- Title fights: 6

Chronology
| 1991 in Shooto | 1992 in Shooto | 1993 in Shooto |

The year 1992 is the 4th year in the history of Shooto, a mixed martial arts promotion based in the Japan. In 1992 Shooto held 5 events beginning with, Shooto: Shooto.

== Title fights ==
Title fights in 1992
| Weight class | | | | Method | Round | Time | Event | Notes |
|---|---|---|---|---|---|---|---|---|
| Featherweight | Noboru Asahi | def. | Kazuhiro Sakamoto (c) | Decision (Majority) | 5 | 3:00 | Shooto: March 27 | (Note: Asahi defeated Sakamoto to become the Shooto Featherweight Champion.) |
| Middleweight | Kenji Kawaguchi (c) | def. | Manabu Yamada | Submission (Kneebar) | 1 | 0:36 | Shooto: July 23 | (Note: Kawaguchi defeated Yamada to remain the Shooto Middleweight Champion.) |
| Featherweight | Noboru Asahi (c) | vs. | Kenichi Tanaka | Draw | 5 | 3:00 | Shooto: July 23 | (Note: Asahi fought to a draw with Tanaka to remain the Shooto Featherweight Champion.) |
| Welterweight | Naoki Sakurada (c) | def. | Kazuhiro Kusayanagi | Decision (Unanimous) | 5 | 3:00 | Shooto: September 25 | (Note: Sakurada defeated Tanaka to remain the Shooto Welterweight Champion.) |
| Lightweight | Tomonori Ohara (c) | def. | Tomohiro Tanaka | TKO (Punches) | 1 | 2:03 | Shooto: September 25 | (Note: Ohara defeated Tanaka to remain the Shooto Lightweight Champion.) |
| Middleweight | Kenji Kawaguchi (c) | vs. | Satoshi Honma | Draw | 5 | 3:00 | Shooto: November 27 | (Note: Kawaguchi fought to a draw with Honma to remain the Shooto Middleweight Champion.) |

== Events list ==
| # | Event Title | Date | Arena | Location |
|---|---|---|---|---|
| 21 | Shooto: November 27 | November 27, 1992 | Korakuen Hall | Tokyo, Japan |
| 20 | Shooto: September 25 | September 25, 1992 | Korakuen Hall | Tokyo, Japan |
| 19 | Shooto: July 23 | July 23, 1992 | Korakuen Hall | Tokyo, Japan |
| 18 | Shooto: May 29 | May 29, 1992 | Korakuen Hall | Tokyo, Japan |
| 17 | Shooto: March 27 | March 27, 1992 | Korakuen Hall | Tokyo, Japan |

== Shooto: March 27 ==
Shooto: Shooto was an event held on March 27, 1992, at Korakuen Hall in Tokyo, Japan.

=== Results ===
Main Card
| Weight class | | | | Method | Round | Time | Notes |
|---|---|---|---|---|---|---|---|
| Featherweight | Noboru Asahi | def. | Kazuhiro Sakamoto (c) | Decision (Majority) | 5 | 3:00 | (Note: Asahi defeated Sakamoto to become the Shooto Featherweight Champion.) |
| | Manabu Yamada | def. | Satoshi Honma | Submission (Armbar) | 3 | 0:00 |
| | Yuichi Watanabe | def. | Tomonori Ohara | Submission (Kneebar) | 1 | 0:00 |
| | Tomohiro Tanaka | def. | Yuji Ito | KO (Punch) | 1 | 0:00 |
| | Masato Suzuki | def. | Takenori Ito | Decision (Unanimous) | 3 | 3:00 |
| | Kenji Ogusu | def. | Toshio Ando | Decision (Unanimous) | 3 | 3:00 |
| | Mamoru Okochi | def. | Akiyuki Takatsuka | Decision (Unanimous) | 3 | 3:00 |

== Shooto: May 29 ==
Shooto: Shooto was an event held on May 29, 1992, at Korakuen Hall in Tokyo, Japan.

=== Results ===
Main Card
| Weight class | | | | Method | Round | Time | Notes |
|---|---|---|---|---|---|---|---|
| | Yuichi Watanabe | def. | Naoki Sakurada | Submission (Kneebar) | 3 | 0:57 |
| | Yoshimasa Ishikawa | def. | Tomonori Ohara | N/A | 3 | 0:54 |
| | Kenichi Tanaka | def. | Hiroyuki Kanno | Submission (Kimura) | 3 | 0:00 |
| | Kazuhiro Kusayanagi | def. | Yutaka Fuji | Submission (Armbar) | 1 | 0:00 |
| | Mamoru Okochi | def. | Takashi Nishizawa | Submission (Triangle Choke) | 1 | 0:00 |
| | Misaki Kubota | vs. | Kenji Ogusu | Draw | 3 | 3:00 |
| | Masaya Onodera | def. | Keiichi Motomura | KO | 2 | 0:00 |

== Shooto: July 23 ==
Shooto: Shooto was an event held on July 23, 1992, at Korakuen Hall in Tokyo, Japan.

=== Results ===
Main Card
| Weight class | | | | Method | Round | Time | Notes |
|---|---|---|---|---|---|---|---|
| Middleweight | Kenji Kawaguchi (c) | def. | Manabu Yamada | Submission (Kneebar) | 1 | 0:36 | (Note: Kawaguchi defeated Yamada to remain the Shooto Middleweight Champion.) |
| Featherweight | Noboru Asahi (c) | vs. | Kenichi Tanaka | Draw | 5 | 3:00 | (Note: Asahi fought to a draw with Tanaka to remain the Shooto Featherweight Champion.) |
| | Naoki Sakurada | def. | Tomohiro Tanaka | KO | 2 | 0:00 |
| | Takashi Ishizaki | def. | Masato Suzuki | Decision (Unanimous) | 4 | 3:00 |
| | Suguru Shigeno | def. | Hiroaki Matsutani | Decision (Unanimous) | 4 | 3:00 |
| | Mamoru Okochi | def. | Tadashi Murakami | Decision (Unanimous) | 3 | 3:00 |
| | Kenji Ogusu | def. | Yoshiaki Murai | Decision (Unanimous) | 3 | 3:00 |

== Shooto: September 25 ==
Shooto: Shooto was an event held on September 25, 1992, at Korakuen Hall in Tokyo, Japan.

=== Results ===
Main Card
| Weight class | | | | Method | Round | Time | Notes |
|---|---|---|---|---|---|---|---|
| Welterweight | Naoki Sakurada (c) | def. | Kazuhiro Kusayanagi | Decision (Unanimous) | 5 | 3:00 | (Note: Sakurada defeated Tanaka to remain the Shooto Welterweight Champion.) |
| Lightweight | Tomonori Ohara (c) | def. | Tomohiro Tanaka | TKO (Punches) | 1 | 2:03 | (Note: Ohara defeated Tanaka to remain the Shooto Lightweight Champion.) |
| | Noboru Asahi | def. | Hiroyuki Kanno | Submission (Armbar) | 2 | 1:05 |
| | Masato Suzuki | vs. | Masaya Onodera | Draw | 3 | 3:00 |
| | Kenji Ogusu | vs. | Tadashi Murakami | Draw | 3 | 3:00 |
| | Takenori Ito | def. | Norito Ogasawara | Submission (Armbar) | 1 | 1:53 |

== Shooto: November 27 ==
Shooto: Shooto was an event held on November 27, 1992, at Korakuen Hall in Tokyo, Japan.

=== Results ===
Main Card
| Weight class | | | | Method | Round | Time | Notes |
|---|---|---|---|---|---|---|---|
| Middleweight | Kenji Kawaguchi (c) | vs. | Satoshi Honma | Draw | 5 | 3:00 | (Note: Kawaguchi fought to a draw with Honma to remain the Shooto Middleweight Champion.) |
| | Yuji Ito | def. | Tomonori Ohara | Decision (Unanimous) | 5 | 3:00 |
| | Noboru Asahi | def. | Takashi Ishizaki | Submission (Armbar) | 5 | 0:43 |
| | Manabu Yamada | def. | Kazuhiro Kusayanagi | Submission (Armbar) | 1 | 1:05 |
| | Satoshi Fukuoka | vs. | Takeshi Miyanaga | Draw | 3 | 3:00 |

== See also ==
- Shooto
- List of Shooto champions
- List of Shooto Events
