= Yoshimasa Ishikawa =

Japanese mixed martial artist

Yoshimasa Ishikawa 石川義正
- Born: Japan
- Nationality: Japanese
- Weight: 152 lb (69 kg; 10.9 st)
- Division: Lightweight
- Style: Shoot wrestling, Catch Wrestling, Shoot Boxing, Shooto, Submission Wrestling
- Team: Shooting Gym Yokohama
- Years active: 1989 - 1992

Mixed martial arts record
- Total: 9
- Wins: 4
- By knockout: 1
- By submission: 1
- By decision: 1
- Unknown: 1
- Losses: 5
- By knockout: 2
- By submission: 3

Other information
- Mixed martial arts record from Sherdog

Yoshimasa Ishikawa (Japanese: 石川義正) is a Japanese mixed martial artist. He competed in the Lightweight division. He was Shooto's second middleweight champion, defeating Yasuto Sekishima. Ishikawa vacated the title in 1991 to compete as a lightweight.

He was a trainer for Shooting Gym Yokohama. After retirement, he later opened his own school under the name Mixed Martial Arts Shooshindo.

== Championships and accomplishments ==
- Shooto
  - Shooto Middleweight Championship (one time)

== Mixed martial arts record ==
Professional record breakdown
9 matches	4 wins	5 losses
By knockout	1	2
By submission	1	3
By decision	1	0
Unknown	1	0

Res.	Record	Opponent	Method	Event	Date	Round	Time	Location	Notes
Win	4–5	Tomonori Ohara	N/A	Shooto - Shooto	May 29, 1992	3	0:54	Tokyo, Japan	
Loss	3–5	Tomonori Ohara	TKO (broken hand)	Shooto - Shooto	October 17, 1991	2	2:35	Tokyo, Japan	
Win	3–4	Yasuto Sekishima	Decision (unanimous)	Shooto - Shooto	August 3, 1991	5	3:00	Tokyo, Japan	
Loss	2–4	Satoshi Honma	Submission (armbar)	Shooto - Shooto	May 31, 1991	2	0:00	Tokyo, Japan	
Win	2–3	Tomonori Ohara	Submission (guillotine choke)	Shooto - Shooto	March 29, 1991	4	0:00	Tokyo, Japan	
Loss	1–3	Manabu Yamada	TKO (punches)	Shooto - Shooto	September 8, 1990	1	2:07	Tokyo, Japan	
Loss	1–2	Yasuto Sekishima	Submission (rear-naked choke)	Shooto - Shooto	May 12, 1990	1	1:49	Tokyo, Japan	
Loss	1–1	Yasuto Sekishima	Submission (kimura)	Shooto - Shooto	January 13, 1990	1	2:18	Tokyo, Japan	
Win	1–0	Kazuhiro Kusayanagi	KO (spinning back kick)	Shooto - Shooto	October 19, 1989	4	0:13	Tokyo, Japan	

== See also ==
- List of male mixed martial artists
