= Yuichi Watanabe =

Japanese mixed martial artist

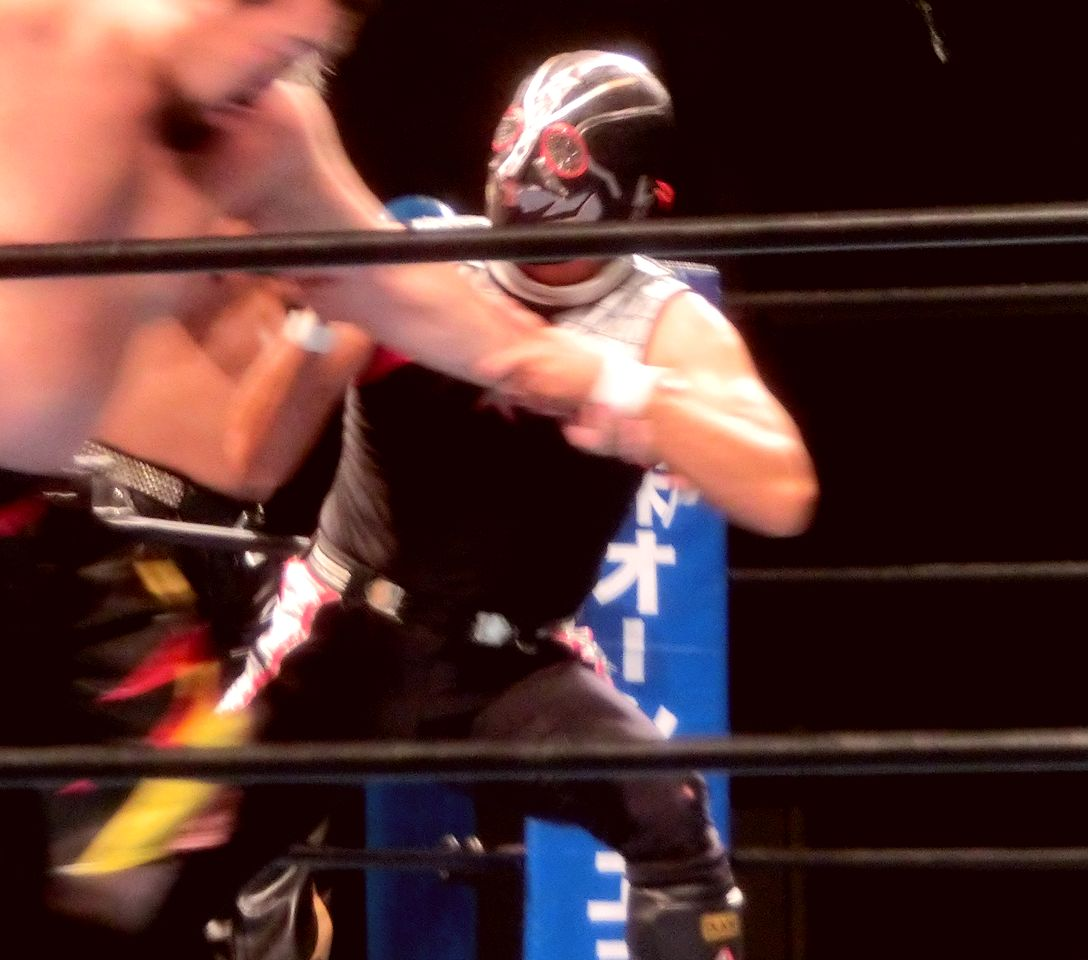
- Born: November 9, 1962 (age 63); Fukuoka, Japan
- Other names: Super Rider; Kamen Shooter; Hopper King; Kamen Shooter Super Rider "Shooter"
- Nationality: Japanese
- Height: 5 ft 8 in (173 cm)
- Weight: 152 lb (69 kg; 10.9 st)
- Division: Lightweight
- Style: Shoot wrestling, Pro wrestling, Shoot boxing, Catch wrestling, Submission wrestling, sambo, judo
- Team: Shooting Gym Mobara
- Years active: 1989–1992 (MMA)

Mixed martial arts record
- Total: 9
- Wins: 6
- By submission: 5
- By decision: 1
- Losses: 3
- By knockout: 1
- By submission: 2

Other information
- Notable relatives: Shooto Watanabe, son
- Website: Seikendo（掣圏真陰流）
- Mixed martial arts record from Sherdog

Yuichi Watanabe (渡部 優一, Watanabe Yūichi; born November 9, 1962) is a Japanese mixed martial artist and professional wrestler. He competed in Shooto's Lightweight division and was the inaugural Shooto Lightweight Champion defeating Kazuhiro Kusayanagi. As a pro wrestler he competes for Real Japan Pro Wrestling under the name Super Rider (スーパーライダー, Sūpā Raidā). He has also wrestled for notable promotions such as W*ING, Big Japan Pro Wrestling, IWA Japan, Battlarts, Dramatic Dream Team, Pro Wrestling Kageki, Pro Wrestling Zero1 and Diamond Ring.

== Background and career ==
Watanabe trained under Satoru Sayama in Shooto and was also one of his first trainees at his Seikendo school. He also learned shootboxing under Caesar Takeshi, was an amateur wrestling champion in high school, was the captain of his high school club wrestling club with Mitsuharu Misawa as his vice-captain and Toshiaki Kawada as his junior, competed in the 1984 All Japan Student Wrestling Championships representing Nihon University losing to future Olympic medalist Kosei Akaishi in the finals in the 68 kg freestyle division, and also trained in sambo and judo. Watanabe initially worked as a trainer at Shooting Gym Mobara, as well as an instructor for Sayama's Seikendo school. He now runs the Super Tiger Gym Gunma as a head trainer.

== Personal life ==
Watanabe is the father of professional MMA fighters Kenshiro and Shuto "Shooto" Watanabe.

== Championships and accomplishments ==
- Shooto
  - Shooto Lightweight Championship (1 time, inaugural champion)

== Mixed martial arts record ==
Professional record breakdown
9 matches	6 wins	3 losses
By knockout	0	1
By submission	5	2
By decision	1	0

Res.	Record	Opponent	Method	Event	Date	Round	Time	Location	Notes
Win	6–3	Naoki Sakurada	Submission (kneebar)	Shooto - Shooto	May 29, 1992	3	0:57	Tokyo, Japan	
Win	5–3	Tomonori Ohara	Submission (kneebar)	Shooto - Shooto	March 27, 1992	1	0:00	Tokyo, Japan	
Loss	4–3	Naoki Sakurada	Submission (armbar)	Shooto - Shooto	August 25, 1991	5	2:03	Tokyo, Japan	
Win	4–2	Kazuhiro Kusayanagi	Submission (kneebar)	Shooto - Shooto	March 29, 1991	1	0:00	Tokyo, Japan	
Win	3–2	Tomonori Ohara	Decision (unanimous)	Shooto - Shooto	January 13, 1991	5	3:00	Tokyo, Japan	
Loss	2–2	Yuji Ito	TKO (punches)	Shooto - Shooto	May 12, 1990	3	1:49	Tokyo, Japan	
Win	2–1	Kazuhiro Sakamoto	Submission (armbar)	Shooto - Shooto	January 13, 1990	2	2:54	Tokyo, Japan	
Loss	1–1	Naoki Sakurada	Submission (heel hook)	Shooto - Shooto	July 29, 1989	1	0:00	Tokyo, Japan	
Win	1–0	Yuji Ito	Submission (armbar)	Shooto - Shooto	May 18, 1989	1	0:00	Tokyo, Japan	

== See also ==
- List of male mixed martial artists
