= 1991 in Shooto =

Mixed martial arts events

Information
- First date: January 13, 1991
- Last date: December 23, 1991

Events
- Total events: 7

Fights
- Total fights: 41
- Title fights: 8

Chronology
1990 in Shooto	1991 in Shooto	1992 in Shooto

The year 1991 is the 3rd year in the history of Shooto, a mixed martial arts promotion based in the Japan. In 1991 Shooto held 7 events beginning with, Shooto: Shooto.

== Title fights ==
Title fights in 1991
Weight class				Method	Round	Time	Event	Notes
Lightweight	Yuichi Watanabe	def.	Kazuhiro Kusayanagi	Submission (Kneebar)	1	0:00	Shooto: Shooto (March)	(Note: Watanabe defeated Kusayanagi to become the inaugural Shooto Lightweight Champion.)
Middleweight	Kenji Kawaguchi	def.	Manabu Yamada	Submission (Kneebar)	1	0:58	Shooto: Shooto (May)	(Note: Kawaguchi defeated Yamada to become the inaugural Shooto Middleweight Champion.)
Featherweight	Kazuhiro Sakamoto	def.	Kenichi Tanaka (c)	Decision (Unanimous)	5	3:00	Shooto: Shooto (May)	(Note: Sakamoto defeated Tanaka to become the Shooto Featherweight Champion.)
Welterweight	Yoshimasa Ishikawa	def.	Yasuto Sekishima (c)	Decision (Unanimous)	5	3:00	Shooto: Shooto (August 3)	(Note: Ishikawa defeated Sekishima to become the Shooto Welterweight Champion.)
Lightweight	Tomonori Ohara	def.	Yoshimasa Ishikawa	TKO (Broken Hand)	2	2:35	Shooto: Shooto (October)	(Note: Ohara defeated Ishikawa to become the Shooto Lightweight Champion.)
Featherweight	Kazuhiro Sakamoto (c)	def.	Hiroyuki Kanno	Submission (Armbar)	2	1:52	Shooto: Shooto (October)	(Note: Sakamoto defeated Kanno to remain the Shooto Featherweight Champion.)
Middleweight	Kenji Kawaguchi (c)	def.	Satoshi Honma	Decision (Unanimous)	5	3:00	Shooto: Shooto (October)	(Note: Kawaguchi defeated Honma to remain the Shooto Middleweight Champion.)
Welterweight	Naoki Sakurada	def.	Yasuto Sekishima	Decision (Majority)	5	3:00	Shooto: Shooto (October)	(Note: Sakurada defeated Sekishima to become the Shooto Welterweight Champion.)

== Events list ==
#	Event title	Date	Arena	Location
16	Shooto: Shooto (December)	December 23, 1991	Korakuen Hall	Tokyo, Japan
15	Shooto: Shooto (October)	October 17, 1991	Osaka Prefectural Gymnasium	Osaka, Kansai, Japan
14	Shooto: Shooto (August 25)	August 25, 1991	Korakuen Hall	Tokyo, Japan
13	Shooto: Shooto (August 3)	August 3, 1991	Korakuen Hall	Tokyo, Japan
12	Shooto: Shooto (May)	May 31, 1991	Korakuen Hall	Tokyo, Japan
11	Shooto: Shooto (March)	March 29, 1991	Korakuen Hall	Tokyo, Japan
10	Shooto: Shooto (January)	January 13, 1991	Korakuen Hall	Tokyo, Japan

== Shooto: Shooto (January) ==
Shooto: Shooto was an event held on January 13, 1991, at Korakuen Hall in Tokyo, Japan.

=== Results ===
Main Card
Weight class				Method	Round	Time	Notes
	Yuichi Watanabe	def.	Tomonori Ohara	Decision (Unanimous)	5	3:00
	Yasuto Sekishima	def.	Manabu Yamada	KO (Punch)	2	0:00
	Kenji Kawaguchi	def.	Naoki Sakurada	Submission (Guillotine Choke)	1	0:00
	Hiroyuki Kanno	vs.	Suguru Shigeno	Draw	3	3:00
	Hiroaki Matsutani	def.	Tetsuya Hirada	Decision (Unanimous)	3	3:00
	Mamoru Okochi	def.	Makoto Mizoguchi	Submission (Rear-Naked Choke)	2	0:00

== Shooto: Shooto (March) ==
Shooto: Shooto was an event held on March 29, 1991, at Korakuen Hall in Tokyo, Japan.

=== Results ===
Main Card
Weight class				Method	Round	Time	Notes
Lightweight	Yuichi Watanabe	def.	Kazuhiro Kusayanagi	Submission (Kneebar)	1	0:00	(Note: Watanabe defeated Kusayanagi to become the inaugural Shooto Lightweight Champion.)
	Yasuto Sekishima	def.	Takashi Tojo	Submission (Armbar)	2	0:00
	Hiroyuki Kanno	def.	Kenichi Tanaka	Decision (Unanimous)	5	3:00
	Kazuhiro Sakamoto	def.	Noboru Asahi	Decision (Unanimous)	5	3:00
	Yoshimasa Ishikawa	def.	Tomonori Ohara	Submission (Guillotine Choke)	4	0:00
	Tomoyuki Saito	def.	Mamoru Okochi	Submission (Rear-Naked Choke)	2	0:00
	Tomohiro Tanaka	def.	Masanori Yoneyama	Decision (Unanimous)	3	3:00

== Shooto: Shooto (May) ==
Shooto: Shooto was an event held on May 31, 1991, at Korakuen Hall in Tokyo, Japan.

=== Results ===
Main Card
Weight class				Method	Round	Time	Notes
Middleweight	Kenji Kawaguchi	def.	Manabu Yamada	Submission (Kneebar)	1	0:58	(Note: Kawaguchi defeated Yamada to become the inaugural Shooto Middleweight Champion.)
Featherweight	Kazuhiro Sakamoto	def.	Kenichi Tanaka (c)	Decision (Unanimous)	5	3:00	(Note: Sakamoto defeated Tanaka to become the Shooto Featherweight Champion.)
	Naoki Sakurada	def.	Tomonori Ohara	Submission (Armbar)	5	0:00
	Satoshi Honma	def.	Yoshimasa Ishikawa	Submission (Armbar)	2	0:00
	Tomohiro Tanaka	def.	Suguru Shigeno	KO	3	0:00
	Mamoru Okochi	def.	Misaki Kubota	Decision (Unanimous)	3	3:00

== Shooto: Shooto (August 3) ==
Shooto: Shooto was an event held on August 3, 1991, at Korakuen Hall in Tokyo, Japan.

=== Results ===
Main Card
Weight class				Method	Round	Time	Notes
Welterweight	Yoshimasa Ishikawa	def.	Yasuto Sekishima (c)	Decision (Unanimous)	5	3:00	(Note: Ishikawa defeated Sekishima to become the Shooto Welterweight Champion.)
	Kazuhiro Sakamoto	def.	Hiroaki Matsutani	Submission (Armbar)	3	0:00
	Satoshi Honma	def.	Manabu Yamada	Submission (Armbar)	4	0:00
	Noboru Asahi	vs.	Tomohiro Tanaka	Draw	4	3:00
	Suguru Shigeno	def.	Mamoru Okochi	Decision (Unanimous)	3	3:00
	Tadashi Murakami	def.	Takashi Nishizawa	Submission (Achilles Lock)	1	1:12

== Shooto: Shooto (August 25) ==
Shooto: Shooto was an event held on August 25, 1991, at Korakuen Hall in Tokyo, Japan.

=== Results ===
Main Card
Weight class				Method	Round	Time	Notes
	Naoki Sakurada	def.	Yuichi Watanabe	Submission (Armbar)	5	2:03
	Kenji Kawaguchi	vs.	Kazuhiro Kusayanagi	Draw	5	3:00
	Tomonori Ohara	vs.	Takashi Tojo	Draw	4	3:00
	Hiroyuki Kanno	def.	Makoto Mizoguchi	Submission (Armbar)	2	2:46
	Masato Suzuki	def.	Kenji Ogusu	Decision (Unanimous)	3	3:00

== Shooto: Shooto (October) ==
Shooto: Shooto was an event held on October 17, 1991, at Osaka Prefectural Gymnasium in Osaka, Japan.

=== Results ===
Main Card
Weight class				Method	Round	Time	Notes
Lightweight	Tomonori Ohara	def.	Yoshimasa Ishikawa	TKO (Broken Hand)	2	2:35	(Note: Ohara defeated Ishikawa to become the Shooto Lightweight Champion.)
Featherweight	Kazuhiro Sakamoto (c)	def.	Hiroyuki Kanno	Submission (Armbar)	2	1:52	(Note: Sakamoto defeated Kanno to remain the Shooto Featherweight Champion.)
Middleweight	Kenji Kawaguchi (c)	def.	Satoshi Honma	Decision (Unanimous)	5	3:00	(Note: Kawaguchi defeated Honma to remain the Shooto Middleweight Champion.)
Welterweight	Naoki Sakurada	def.	Yasuto Sekishima	Decision (Majority)	5	3:00	(Note: Sakurada defeated Sekishima to become the Shooto Welterweight Champion.)
	Kazuhiro Kusayanagi	def.	Tomohiro Tanaka	Submission (Armbar)	1	0:00
	Noboru Asahi	def.	Masato Suzuki	Submission (Kneebar)	1	0:00

== Shooto: Shooto (December) ==
Shooto: Shooto was an event held on December 23, 1991, at Korakuen Hall in Tokyo, Japan.

=== Results ===
Main Card
Weight class				Method	Round	Time	Notes
	Naoki Sakurada	def.	Kazuhiro Kusayanagi	Decision (Majority)	5	3:00
	Noboru Asahi	vs.	Kenichi Tanaka	Draw	5	3:00
	Manabu Yamada	def.	Yutaka Fuji	Submission (Kneebar)	1	1:39
	Tadashi Murakami	def.	Tadeshi Kaneko	Decision (Unanimous)	3	3:00
	Takenori Ito	def.	Yoshihiko Abe	Submission (Armbar)	1	0:00

== See also ==
- Shooto
- List of Shooto champions
- List of Shooto Events
