= Vale Tudo Japan =

Japanese mixed martial arts competition

- Native name: ヴァーリ・トゥード・ジャパン
- Industry: Mixed martial arts promotion
- Founded: Japan (1994)
- Founder: Satoru Sayama
- Defunct: 1999 (first run); 2016 (second run)
- Parent: Shooto (1994-1999); Vale Tudo Japan Executive Committee (2009-2016)
- Website: http://www.valetudojapan.com/

Vale Tudo Japan (VTJ) (Japanese: ヴァーリ・トゥード・ジャパン, Hepburn: Vāri Tūdo Japan) was a mixed martial arts competition held in Japan. Founded by promoter and former professional wrestler Satoru Sayama and his organization Shooto, its first event was held in 1994. The 1994 tournament introduced ground striking to a major Japanese MMA event and helped lay the groundwork for modern Japanese MMA.

The events featured Japanese fighters from Shooto and the shoot wrestling circuit as well as international participants, including Brazilian jiu-jitsu practitioner Rickson Gracie. Vale Tudo Japan events ran from 1994 to 1999; a pair of editions held in 1994 and '95 were single-elimination tournaments, both of which were won by Rickson Gracie. Afterwards, from 1996 to 1999 the events were invitationals.

Vale Tudo Japan returned in 2009, organized by the Vale Tudo Japan Executive Committee. The revived series ran through 2016, and a standalone VTJ 2021 event was held in 2021.

== History ==
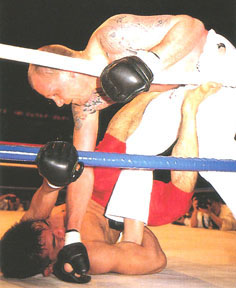
Yuki Nakai fights Gerard Gordeau at Vale Tudo Japan 1995

Satoru Sayama, a former professional wrestler who had founded the hybrid martial arts organization Shooto in 1985, was impressed by the early Ultimate Fighting Championship (UFC) events. He subsequently sought to organize an event inspired by both the UFC and the vale tudo competitions held in Brazil.

In 1994, Sayama arranged Vale Tudo Japan (VTJ), with the inaugural event, Vale Tudo Japan Open 1994 taking place at the Tokyo Bay NK Hall. The events featured fighters from a variety of martial arts backgrounds and emphasized matches between competitors with different fighting styles. The events were presented as legitimate martial arts competitions, with rules designed to allow techniques from multiple disciplines. The fighters were composed by the best Japanese MMA fighters drawn from Shooto, the Shoot Wrestling circuit as well as foreign invitees, one of them and most famously being the older brother of UFC champion Royce Gracie, Brazilian jiu-jitsu legend Rickson Gracie. The first events held in 1994 and '95 were single-elimination tournaments, both of which were won by Gracie. Afterwards, from 1996 to 1999 the events were invitationals. Some other notable fighters to fight at Vale Tudo Japan include Sanae Kikuta, Takanori Gomi, Enson Inoue, João Roque, Carlos Newton, Rumina Sato, Royler Gracie, Dan Severn, Vladimir Matyushenko, Frank Shamrock, Jean Jacques Machado, Randy Couture, Frank Trigg, André Pederneiras, Rafael Cordeiro, Alexandre Franca Nogueira, Hayato Sakurai, and Yuki Nakai.

Vale Tudo Japan became an important platform for the development of mixed martial arts in Japan. Similar to his brother's victory in the UFC, Rickson Gracie's success in Vale Tudo Japan helped raise the profile Brazilian jiu-jitsu in mixed martial arts competition for the Japanese audience. Prior to this tournament, Shooto rules did not feature striking in ground position and Sayama would subsequently introduce ground striking into Shooto. Vale Tudo Japan also served as an important stepping stone for Women's mixed martial arts, with Vale Tudo Japan 1996 featuring a fight between joshi professional wrestler Yumiko Hotta and Dutch kickoxer Margot Neyhoft.

Early Vale Tudo Japan events were successful, leading to a boom of the popularity and development of MMA and Shooto in Japan, and the tournament is considered a predecessor to PRIDE Fighting Championships. VTJ's format and rules would serve as a basis for PRIDE, while Rickson Gracie's impressive victories in VTJ would make him a celebrity in Japan, leading to him being paired with popular Shoot-style professional wrestler Nobuhiko Takada to headline Pride 1 in 1997. The original Vale Tudo Japan series ended in 1999 after Shooto officials considered the event's purpose fulfilled, as Shooto had developed into an established MMA organization and VTJ was no longer considered necessary as a separate event.

Vale Tudo Japan returned in 2009 after a ten-year hiatus, organized by the Vale Tudo Japan Executive Committee in association with Shooto. The revival featured several veterans of the original series, including Takanori Gomi, Rumina Sato and Alexandre Franca Nogueira, while also serving as an opportunity for Shooto officials to test potential changes to its rules, including five-round fights, smaller gloves, and knees and stomps to grounded opponents. The revived series ran from 2009 until 2016.

After a five-year hiatus, VTJ was revived in 2021 as a special standalone event intended to restore its original "Japan vs. the world" concept. According to Sustain (the company responsible for promoting Professional Shooto) representative Kazuhiro Sakamoto, the COVID-19 pandemic had created a lack of opportunities for Japanese fighters to compete against foreign opponents, and the organizers saw the revival as an opportunity to test ways of bringing international fighters back to Japan. The event was therefore held as a one-off alongside a Professional Shooto card, with the aim of providing Japanese fighters with international competition. The event also used a mixed martial arts cage rather than the traditional Shooto ring used in former editions.

== Events and results ==
=== Vale Tudo Japan 1994 ===
Vale Tudo Japan 1994
- Promotion: Vale Tudo Japan
- Date: July 29, 1994
- Venue: Tokyo Bay NK Hall
- City: Urayasu, Chiba, Japan

Event chronology
Vale Tudo Japan 1994	Vale Tudo Japan 1995

Vale Tudo Japan 1994 was held on July 29, 1994, at the Tokyo Bay NK Hall in Urayasu, Japan.

Main Card
Weight class				Method	Round	Time	Notes
	(Brazil) Rickson Gracie	def.	(United States) Bud Smith	Submission (punches)	1	0:39
	(Japan) Naoki Sakurada	vs.	(Japan) Yasushi Warita	Draw	5	5:00
	(Brazil) Rickson Gracie	def.	(United States) David Levicki	Submission (punches)	1	2:40
	(Brazil) Rickson Gracie	def.	(Japan) Yoshinori Nishi	Submission (rear naked choke)	1	2:52
	(United States) David Levicki	def.	(Japan) Kazuhiro Kusayanagi	KO (punches)	1	1:20
	(Netherlands) Jan Lomulder	def.	(Japan) Kenji Kawaguchi	KO (punch)	1	3:59
	(United States) Bud Smith	def.	(Netherlands) Chris Bass	TKO (straight punch)	1	0:54

=== Vale Tudo Japan 1994 bracket ===
Quarter-finals
(United States) Bud Smith	TKO
(Netherlands) Chris Bass	1
(Netherlands) Jan Lomulder	KO
(Japan) Kenji Kawaguchi	1
(United States) David Levicki	KO
(Japan) Kazuhiro Kusayanagi	1
(Brazil) Rickson Gracie	SUB
(Japan) Yoshinori Nishi	1

Semi-finals
(United States) Bud Smith	WO*
(Netherlands) Jan Lomulder	0
(United States) David Levicki	1
(Brazil) Rickson Gracie	SUB

Final
(United States) Bud Smith	1
(Brazil) Rickson Gracie	SUB

* = Lomulder was unable to continue.

=== Vale Tudo Japan 1995 ===
Vale Tudo Japan 1995
- Promotion: Vale Tudo Japan
- Date: April 20, 1995
- Venue: Nippon Budokan Hall
- City: Chiyoda, Tokyo, Japan

Event chronology
Vale Tudo Japan 1994	Vale Tudo Japan 1995	Vale Tudo Japan 1996

Vale Tudo Japan 1995 was held on April 20, 1995, at the Nippon Budokan Hall in Chiyoda, Tokyo, Japan.

Main Card
Weight class				Method	Round	Time	Notes
	(Brazil) Rickson Gracie	def.	(Japan) Yuki Nakai	Submission (rear naked choke)	1	6:22
	(United States) Enson Inoue	def.	(Netherlands) Rene Rooze	Submission (rear naked choke)	1	6:41
	(Japan) Kenji Kawaguchi	def.	(United States) Tommy Walkingstick	Submission (armbar)	1	6:29
	(Brazil) Rickson Gracie	def.	(Japan) Koichiro Kimura	Submission (rear naked choke)	1	2:07
	(Japan) Koichiro Kimura	def.	(United States) Wayne Emons	Submission (guillotine choke)	1	6:05
	(Japan) Yuki Nakai	def.	(United States) Craig Pittman	Submission (armbar)	2	7:32
	(Brazil) Rickson Gracie	def.	(Japan) Yoshihisa Yamamoto	Technical Submission (rear naked choke)	3	3:49
	(United States) Todd Hays	def.	(Japan) Koichiro Kimura	Submission (guillotine choke)	1	2:55
	(Japan) Yuki Nakai	def.	(Netherlands) Gerard Gordeau	Submission (heel hook)	4	2:41
	(United States) Craig Pittman	def.	(United States) Wayne Emons	Submission (arm triangle choke)	1	2:12

=== Vale Tudo Japan 1995 bracket ===
Quarter-finals
(United States) Craig Pittman	SUB
(United States) Wayne Emons	1
(Japan) Yuki Nakai	SUB
(Netherlands) Gerard Gordeau	4
(United States) Todd Hays	SUB
(Japan) Koichiro Kimura	1
(Brazil) Rickson Gracie	SUB
(Japan) Yoshihisa Yamamoto	1

Semi-finals
(United States) Craig Pittman	2
(Japan) Yuki Nakai	SUB
(Japan) Koichiro Kimura*	1
(Brazil) Rickson Gracie	SUB

Final
(Japan) Yuki Nakai	1
(Brazil) Rickson Gracie	SUB

* = Hays was unable to continue. Kimura defeated Emons to claim his place.

=== Vale Tudo Japan 1996 ===
Vale Tudo Japan 1996
- Promotion: Vale Tudo Japan
- Date: July 7, 1996
- Venue: Tokyo Bay NK Hall
- City: Urayasu, Chiba, Japan

Event chronology
Vale Tudo Japan 1995	Vale Tudo Japan 1996	Vale Tudo Japan 1997

Vale Tudo Japan 1996 was held on July 7, 1996, at the Tokyo Bay NK Hall in Urayasu, Japan.

Main Card
Weight class				Method	Round	Time	Notes
	(Brazil) Royler Gracie	def.	(Japan) Noboru Asahi	Submission (rear naked choke)	1	5:07
	(Russia) Igor Zinoviev	vs.	(United States) Enson Inoue	TKO (punches)	1	0:44
	(United States) John Lewis	vs.	(Japan) Rumina Sato	Draw	3	8:00
	(United States) Dan Severn	def.	(United States) Doug Murphy	Submission (keylock)	1	3:23
	(United States) Todd Bjornethun	def.	(France) Eric Lavigne	KO (punches)	1	6:53
	(Netherlands) Ed de Kruijf	def.	(United States) Joe Estes	Submission (rear naked choke)	1	0:53
	(Japan) Yumiko Hotta	def.	(Netherlands) Margot Neyhoft	Submission (keylock)	2	4:14
	(Iraq) Mushtaq Abdullah	def.	(Japan) Sanae Kikuta	Submission (forearm choke)	1	6:27
	(Australia) Alex Cook	def.	(Japan) Tomoaki Hayama	Technical Submission (arm triangle choke)	2	6:23

=== Vale Tudo Japan 1997 ===
Vale Tudo Japan 1997
- Promotion: Vale Tudo Japan
- Date: November 29, 1997
- Venue: Tokyo Bay NK Hall
- City: Urayasu, Chiba, Japan

Event chronology
Vale Tudo Japan 1996	Vale Tudo Japan 1997	Vale Tudo Japan 1998

Vale Tudo Japan 1997 was held on November 29, 1997, at the Tokyo Bay NK Hall in Urayasu, Japan.

Main Card
Weight class				Method	Round	Time	Notes
	(United States) Frank Shamrock	def.	(Japan) Enson Inoue	DQ (Egan Inoue ran into the ring)	2	7:17
	(Japan) Rumina Sato	def.	(United States) John Lewis	Submission (armbar)	2	1:23
	(United States) Tom Erikson	def.	(Netherlands) Ed de Kruijf	TKO (punches)	1	0:37
	(Canada) Carlos Newton	def.	(United States) Erik Paulson	Submission (armbar)	1	0:41
	(Angola) João Roque	vs.	(Japan) Uchu Tatsumi	Draw	3	8:00
	(Japan) Kenji Kawaguchi	def.	(Netherlands) Jan Lomulder	Submission (rear naked choke)	3	3:49
	(Japan) Hayato Sakurai	vs.	(Brazil) Marcelo Aguiar	Draw	3	8:00
	(Japan) Jutaro Nakao	def.	(United States) Steve Nelson	Submission (triangle choke)	2	5:31

=== Vale Tudo Japan 1998 ===
Vale Tudo Japan 1998
- Promotion: Vale Tudo Japan
- Date: October 25, 1998
- Venue: Tokyo Bay NK Hall
- City: Urayasu, Chiba, Japan

Event chronology
Vale Tudo Japan 1997	Vale Tudo Japan 1998	Vale Tudo Japan 1999

Vale Tudo Japan 1998 was held on October 25, 1998, at the Tokyo Bay NK Hall in Urayasu, Japan.

Main Card
Weight class				Method	Round	Time	Notes
	(United States) Enson Inoue	def.	(United States) Randy Couture	Submission (armbar)	1	1:39
	(Brazil) Andre Pederneiras	def.	(Japan) Rumina Sato	KO (soccer kick and punches)	1	4:20
	(Japan) Hayato Sakurai	def.	(Russia) Sergei Bytchkov	Submission (armbar)	1	4:59
	(Japan) Noboru Asahi	vs.	(Angola) João Roque	Draw	3	8:00
	(United States) Frank Trigg	vs.	(Brazil) Jean Jacques Machado	TKO (corner stoppage)	3	0:20
	(United States) Branden Lee Hinkle	def.	(Japan) Masanori Suda	TKO (upkicks)	1	5:26
	(Belarus) Vladimir Matyushenko	vs.	(Japan) Kenji Kawaguchi	KO (punches)	1	3:10
	(Japan) Caol Uno	def.	(Brazil) Ricardo Botelho	Submission (punches)	3	2:03

=== Vale Tudo Japan 1999 ===
Vale Tudo Japan 1999
- Promotion: Vale Tudo Japan
- Date: December 11, 1999
- Venue: Tokyo Bay NK Hall
- City: Urayasu, Chiba, Japan

Event chronology
Vale Tudo Japan 1998	Vale Tudo Japan 1999	Vale Tudo Japan 2009

Vale Tudo Japan 1999 was held on December 11, 1999, at the Tokyo Bay NK Hall in Urayasu, Japan.

Main Card
Weight class				Method	Round	Time	Notes
	(Japan) Hayato Sakurai	def.	(Brazil) Haroldo Bunn	TKO (punches)	3	1:31
	(Japan) Caol Uno	vs.	(Brazil) Andre Pederneiras	Draw	3	8:00
	(Japan) Uchu Tatsumi	vs.	(Brazil) Alexandre Franca Nogueira	Draw	3	8:00
	(Japan) Hisao Ikeda	vs.	(Angola) João Roque	Draw	3	8:00
	(Japan) Takanori Gomi	vs.	(Brazil) Johnny Eduardo	Submission (rear naked choke)	3	1:43
	(Japan) Tetsuji Kato	def.	(Brazil) Angelo Sergio	Submission (punches)	1	7:45
	(Japan) Rumina Sato	vs.	(Brazil) Rafael Cordeiro	Submission (kneebar)	1	0:58

=== Vale Tudo Japan 2009 ===
Vale Tudo Japan 2009
- Promotion: Vale Tudo Japan
- Date: October 30, 2009
- Venue: JCB Hall
- City: Tokyo, Japan

Event chronology
Vale Tudo Japan 1999	Vale Tudo Japan 2009	Vale Tudo Japan 2012

Vale Tudo Japan 2009 was held on October 30, 2009, at the JCB Hall in Tokyo, Japan.

Main Card
Weight class				Method	Round	Time	Notes
	(Japan) Takanori Gomi	def.	(United States) Tony Hervey	Decision (unanimous)	5	5:00
	(Japan) Takeshi Inoue	def.	(Brazil) Alexandre Franca Nogueira	TKO (punches)	4	2:58
	(Japan) Rumina Sato	def.	(United States) Corey Grant	TKO (punches)	1	3:20
	(United States) Tito Jones	def.	(Japan) Tenkei Oda	Decision (unanimous)	3	5:00
	(Brazil) Williamy Freire	vs.	(Japan) Kenichiro Togashi	TKO (doctor stoppage)	1	2:05	(Note: For the Shooto World Lightweight Championship.)
	(Japan) Mamoru Yamaguchi	def.	(Guam) Jesse Taitano	TKO (punches)	1	4:41
	(South Korea) Jung Min Kang	vs.	(Japan) Yoichiro Sato	KO (punches)	1	2:48
	(Japan) Masato Sannai	vs.	(Japan) Kosuke Eda	Draw (majority)	2	5:00

=== Vale Tudo Japan: VTJ 1st ===
VTJ 1ST
- Promotion: Vale Tudo Japan
- Date: December 24, 2012
- Venue: Yoyogi National Gymnasium
- City: Tokyo, Japan

Event chronology
Vale Tudo Japan 2009	VTJ 1ST	VTJ 2ND

Vale Tudo Japan: VTJ 1st (also known as VTJ 1ST) was held on December 24, 2012, at the Yoyogi National Gymnasium in Tokyo, Japan.

Main Card
Weight class				Method	Round	Time	Notes
Bantamweight	(Japan) Hideo Tokoro	def.	(Japan) Rumina Sato	TKO (punches and elbows)	1	0:39
Lightweight	(Japan) Kuniyoshi Hironaka	def.	(Brazil) Carlo Prater	Decision (unanimous)	3	5:00
Flyweight	(United States) Darrell Montague	def.	(Japan) Mamoru Yamaguchi	Decision (split)	3	5:00
Bantamweight	(Japan) Kyoji Horiguchi	def.	(United States) Ian Loveland	Decision (unanimous)	3	5:00
Women's Strawweight	(Japan) Megumi Fujii	def.	(Japan) Mei Yamaguchi	TKO (doctor stoppage)	1	2:05
Bantamweight	(Japan) Kenji Osawa	def.	(Japan) Takeshi Inoue	Decision (unanimous)	3	5:00
Middleweight	(Japan) Keita Nakamura	vs.	(Japan) Nobutatsu Suzuki	Submission (rear naked choke)	1	2:09
Welterweight	(Japan) Daisuke Hoshino	vs.	(Thailand) Kuntap Weerasakreck	Submission (armbar)	1	2:19

=== Vale Tudo Japan: VTJ 2nd ===
VTJ 2ND
- Promotion: Vale Tudo Japan
- Date: June 22, 2013
- Venue: Tokyo Dome City Hall
- City: Tokyo, Japan

Event chronology
VTJ 1ST	VTJ 2ND	VTJ 3RD

Vale Tudo Japan: VTJ 2nd (also known as VTJ 2ND) was held on June 22, 2013, at the Tokyo Dome City Hall in Tokyo, Japan.

Main Card
Weight class				Method	Round	Time	Notes
Bantamweight	(Japan) Kyoji Horiguchi	def.	(Japan) Shintaro Ishiwatari	KO/TKO	5	0:41
Featherweight	(United States) Daniel Romero	def.	(Japan) Hiroyuki Takaya	KO/TKO	1	3:21
Catchweight 59 kg	(Japan) Hideo Tokoro	def.	(United States) Taylor McCorriston	Submission (heel hook)	2	2:34
Featherweight	(Japan) Caol Uno	def.	(United States) Anthony Avila	Submission (rear naked choke)	3	1:53
Flyweight	(Japan) Mikihito Yamagami	def.	(Japan) Mamoru Yamaguchi	Decision (majority)	3	5:00
Bantamweight	(Japan) Yuta Nezu	def.	(Japan) Akiyo Nishiura	Decision (unanimous)	3	5:00
Featherweight	(Japan) Teruto Ishihara	def.	(Japan) Koji Mori	KO/TKO	1	2:12
Catchweight 97 kg	(France) Gabriel Zobo Lebay	def.	(Brazil) Lucas Tani	Decision (unanimous)	3	5:00
Preliminary card
Weight class				Method	Round	Time	Notes
Bantamweight	(Japan) Shooto Watanabe	def.	(Japan) Shintaro Kubo	Decision (unanimous)	3	5:00
Lightweight	(Japan) Yuki Kawana	def.	(Japan) Kazumasa Sugawara	Decision (unanimous)	3	5:00
Strawweight	(Japan) Ryuto Sawada	def.	(Japan) Hiroaki Shishino	Submission (armbar)	3	2:36

=== Vale Tudo Japan: VTJ 3rd ===
VTJ 3RD
- Promotion: Vale Tudo Japan
- Date: October 5, 2013
- Venue: Ota City General Gymnasium
- City: Ōta, Tokyo, Japan

Event chronology
VTJ 2ND	VTJ 3RD	VTJ 4TH

Vale Tudo Japan: VTJ 3rd (also known as VTJ 3RD) was held on October 5, 2013, at Ota City General Gymnasium in Ota, Tokyo, Japan. The main event featured longtime # 1 ranked Megumi Fujii in her retirement bout.

Main Card
Weight class				Method	Round	Time	Notes
Women's Strawweight	(Japan) Megumi Fujii	def.	(Mexico) Jessica Aguilar	TKO (doctor stoppage)	2	5:00
Featherweight	(Japan) Caol Uno	def.	(United States) Daniel Romero	Submission (inverted triangle choke)	2	2:23
Flyweight	(United States) Will Campuzano	def.	(Japan) Hideo Tokoro	Decision (split)	3	5:00
Featherweight	(Japan) Yusuke Yachi	def.	(Japan) Takeshi Inoue	Decision (unanimous)	3	5:00
Featherweight	(Japan) Ulka Sasaki	def.	(South Korea) Geun Do Park	Submission (rear naked choke)	1	1:36
Lightweight	(Japan) Naoyuki Kotani	def.	(Japan) Daisuke Hoshino	Submission (armbar)	3	3:57
Bantamweight	(Japan) Yuta Nezu	def.	(Japan) Motonobu Tezuka	Decision (unanimous)	3	5:00
Featherweight	(Japan) Akiyo Nishiura	def.	(Japan) Shigeki Osawa	Decision (split)	3	5:00
Welterweight	(Japan) Koshi Matsumoto	def.	(Japan) Kengo Ura	Decision (unanimous)	3	5:00
Preliminary card
Weight class				Method	Round	Time	Notes
Strawweight	(Japan) Ryuto Sawada	def.	(Japan) Hiroyuki Takahashi	Decision (unanimous)	3	5:00
Flyweight	(Japan) Seiichiro Ito	def.	(Japan) Taku Kajikawa	Submission (armbar)	1	1:35
Featherweight	(Japan) Taiyo Hayashi	def.	(Japan) Yuji Kurogane	TKO (punches)	2	2:18

=== Vale Tudo Japan: VTJ 4th ===
VTJ 4TH
- Promotion: Vale Tudo Japan
- Date: February 23, 2014
- Venue: Ota City General Gymnasium
- City: Ōta, Tokyo, Japan

Event chronology
VTJ 3RD	VTJ 4TH	VTJ 5TH IN OSAKA

Vale Tudo Japan: VTJ 4th (also known as VTJ 4TH) was held on February 23, 2014, at Ota City General Gymnasium in Ota, Tokyo, Japan.

Main Card
Weight class				Method	Round	Time	Notes
Featherweight	(Japan) Hiroyuki Takaya	def.	(Japan) Yojiro Uchimura	TKO (punches)	1	1:23
Featherweight	(Japan) Caol Uno	def.	(United States) Jesse Brock	Decision (unanimous)	3	5:00
Lightweight	(Japan) Naoyuki Kotani	def.	(Japan) Yoshihiro Koyama	Decision (unanimous)	3	5:00
Flyweight	(Japan) Ryuichi Miki	def.	(Japan) Yoshiro Maeda	Decision (unanimous)	3	5:00	(Note: VTJ Flyweight Tournament Quarter Finals)
Flyweight	(United States) Czar Sklavos	def.	(Japan) Mamoru Yamaguchi	Submission (rear naked choke)	1	1:28	(Note: VTJ Flyweight Tournament Quarter Finals)
Flyweight	(Japan) Hiromasa Ougikubo	def.	(Japan) Takeshi Kasugai	Decision (majority)	3	5:00	(Note: VTJ Flyweight Tournament Quarter Finals)
Flyweight	(United States) Kana Hyatt	def.	(United States) Freddy Arteaga	Decision (unanimous)	3	5:00	(Note: VTJ Flyweight Tournament Quarter Finals)
Featherweight	(South Korea) Jae Woong Kim	def.	(Japan) Wataru Miki	Decision (unanimous)	3	5:00
Welterweight	(Japan) Kengo Ura	def.	(Japan) Daisuke Hoshino	Decision (split)	3	5:00
Bantamweight	(Japan) Ulka Sasaki	def.	(Japan) Teruto Ishihara	Submission (rear naked choke)	2	1:46
Preliminary card
Weight class				Method	Round	Time	Notes
Flyweight	(Japan) Katsuya Murofushi	def.	(Japan) Hidenobu Izena	Decision (unanimous)	3	3:00
Lightweight	(Japan) Joji Mikami	def.	(Japan) Kazushi Okutsu	Decision (unanimous)	3	3:00
Featherweight	(Japan) Makoto Maeda	vs.	(Japan) Yuki Suzuki	Draw (majority)	3	3:00

=== Vale Tudo Japan: VTJ 5th in Osaka ===
VTJ 5TH IN OSAKA
- Promotion: Vale Tudo Japan
- Date: June 28, 2014
- Venue: Bodymaker Colosseum
- City: Osaka, Japan

Event chronology
VTJ 4TH	VTJ 5TH IN OSAKA	VTJ 6TH

Vale Tudo Japan: VTJ 5th in Osaka (also known as VTJ 5TH IN OSAKA) was held on June 28, 2014, at Bodymaker Colosseum in Osaka, Japan.

Main Card
Weight class				Method	Round	Time	Notes
Bantamweight	(Japan) Teruto Ishihara	def.	(South Korea) Jung Hwan Jo	TKO (punches)	2	2:24
Flyweight	(United States) Czar Sklavos	def.	(Japan) Ryuichi Miki	Decision (unanimous)	3	5:00	(Note: VTJ Flyweight Tournament Semi Finals)
Flyweight	(Japan) Hiromasa Ougikubo	def.	(United States) Kana Hyatt	Submission (rear naked choke)	1	1:27	(Note: VTJ Flyweight Tournament Semi Finals)
Featherweight	(Japan) Takumi Nakayama	def.	(Japan) Wataru Miki	Submission (rear naked choke)	2	2:28
Bantamweight	(Japan) Yusaku Nakamura	def.	(Japan) Kenji Yamamoto	Decision (unanimous)	3	5:00
Preliminary card
Weight class				Method	Round	Time	Notes
Flyweight	(Japan) Junya Kodo	def.	(Japan) Hidenobu Izena	Submission (guillotine choke)	3	1:25
Featherweight	(Japan) Tsuneo Kimura	def.	(Japan) Kazumasa Majima	Decision (split)	3	3:00
Featherweight	(Japan) Akira Takano	vs.	(Japan) Takaaki Murata	TKO (doctor stoppage)	1	3:00

=== Vale Tudo Japan: VTJ 6th ===
VTJ 6TH
- Promotion: Vale Tudo Japan
- Date: October 4, 2014
- Venue: Ota City General Gymnasium
- City: Ōta, Tokyo, Japan

Event chronology
VTJ 5TH IN OSAKA	VTJ 6TH	VTJ IN OSAKA

Vale Tudo Japan: VTJ 6th (also known as VTJ 6TH) was held on October 4, 2014, at Ota City General Gymnasium in Ōta, Tokyo, Japan.

Main Card
Weight class				Method	Round	Time	Notes
Bantamweight	(Japan) Hiromasa Ougikubo	def.	(United States) Czar Sklavos	Decision (unanimous)	3	5:00	(Note: VTJ Flyweight Tournament Final)
Featherweight	(Japan) Isao Kobayashi	def.	(Japan) Takeshi Inoue	Decision (unanimous)	3	5:00
Featherweight	(Japan) Hiroyuki Takaya	def.	(Japan) Ryogo Takahashi	KO (punch)	2	0:38
Featherweight	(Japan) Caol Uno	def.	(United States) Raja Shippen	Submission (rear naked choke)	2	4:33
Lightweight	(Japan) Kuniyoshi Hironaka	def.	(South Korea) Dong Hyun Ma	Submission (arm triangle choke)	2	2:33
Flyweight	(Japan) Mamoru Yamaguchi	def.	(Japan) Yosuke Saruta	TKO (referee stoppage)	2	0:25
Bantamweight	(Japan) Shoko Sato	def.	(Japan) Kota Onojima	TKO (knees and punches)	1	0:35
Bantamweight	(Japan) Hayato Suzuki	def.	(Japan) Ryuya Fukuda	Decision (unanimous)	3	5:00
Featherweight	(Japan) Joji Mikami	def.	(Japan) Shigeki Osawa	KO (punch)	1	2:01
Featherweight	(Japan) Juri Ohara	def.	(Japan) Kazuyuki Numajiri	TKO (doctor stoppage)	2	2:07
Preliminary card
Weight class				Method	Round	Time	Notes
Featherweight	(Japan) Taison Naito	def.	(Japan) Taiyo Hayashi	Decision (unanimous)	3	3:00
Featherweight	(Japan) Tomoya Hirakawa	def.	(Japan) Daiki Kaneko	Decision (unanimous)	3	3:00
Women's Atomweight	(Japan) Kanna Asakura	vs.	(Japan) Naomi Okaki	Decision (unanimous)	3	3:00

=== Vale Tudo Japan: VTJ in Osaka ===
VTJ in Osaka
- Promotion: Vale Tudo Japan
- Date: June 21, 2015
- Venue: Osaka Prefectural Gymnasium
- City: Osaka, Japan

Event chronology
VTJ 6TH	VTJ in Osaka	VTJ 7TH

Vale Tudo Japan: VTJ in Osaka (also known as VTJ in Osaka) was held on June 21, 2015, at Osaka Prefectural Gymnasium in Osaka, Japan.

Main Card
Weight class				Method	Round	Time	Notes
Flyweight	(Japan) Yoshiro Maeda	def.	(Japan) Kentaro Watanabe	Decision (unanimous)	3	5:00
Flyweight	(Japan) Yusaku Nakamura	def.	(United States) Kana Hyatt	KO (knee to the body)	2	2:22
Flyweight	(Japan) Takeshi Kasugai	def.	(Japan) Kiyotaka Shimizu	Decision (split)	3	5:00
Bantamweight	(Japan) Daisuke Endo	def.	(Japan) Motonobu Tezuka	Decision (split)	3	5:00
Bantamweight	(Japan) Daichi Takenaka	def.	(Japan) Jun Doi	TKO (doctor stoppage)	2	4:09
Bantamweight	(Japan) Kazuma Sone	def.	(Japan) Yuto Hokamura	TKO (head kick and punches)	1	3:52
Featherweight	(Japan) Daiki Tsubota	def.	(Japan) Takaaki Murata	Submission (rear-naked choke)	1	2:34
Women's Catchweight (110 lb)	(Japan) Yukari Yamaguchi	def.	(Japan) Mikiko Hiyama	Submission (rear-naked choke)	1	1:22
Women's Atomweight	(Japan) Kanna Asakura	def.	(Japan) Miyuki Furusawa	Submission (rear-naked choke)	1	2:17
Flyweight	(Japan) Yuto Sekiguchi	def.	(Japan) Yuya Wakamatsu	Submission (armbar)	1	2:43
Featherweight	(Japan) So Murata	vs.	(Japan) Biraru Dodo	KO (punches)	1	0:13

=== Vale Tudo Japan: VTJ 7TH ===
VTJ 7TH
- Promotion: Vale Tudo Japan
- Date: September 13, 2015
- Venue: Maihama Amphitheater
- City: Urayasu, Japan

Event chronology
VTJ IN OSAKA	VTJ 7TH	VTJ IN OKINAWA

Vale Tudo Japan: VTJ 7TH (also known as VTJ 7TH) was held on September 13, 2015, at Maihama Amphitheater in Urayasu, Japan.

Main Card
Weight class				Method	Round	Time	Notes
Flyweight	(Japan) Masaaki Sugawara	def.	(Japan) Kiyotaka Shimizu	Decision (split)	3	5:00
Flyweight	(Japan) Yoshiro Maeda	def.	(Japan) Takaki Soya	Decision (unanimous)	3	5:00
Bantamweight	(Japan) Shoko Sato	def.	(Japan) Tatsuya Ando	Decision (split)	3	5:00
Lightweight	(Japan) Yuki Kawana	def.	(Japan) Daisuke Nakamura	TKO (punches)	3	2:26
Flyweight	(Japan) Yusaku Nakamura	def.	(South Korea) Ssang Soo Kwon	KO (punch)	2	0:36
Bantamweight	(Japan) Daichi Takenaka	def.	(South Korea) Choong Il Jeon	Submission (rear-naked choke)	1	2:16
Featherweight	(Japan) Taison Naito	def.	(South Korea) Min Uk Yoon	TKO (punches)	2	0:54
Lightweight	(Japan) Yoichi Fukumoto	def.	(Japan) Daisuke Hoshino	Decision (unanimous)	3	5:00
Lightweight	(Japan) Joji Mikami	def.	(Japan) Komei Kimura	Submission (rear-naked choke)	1	4:46
Preliminary card
Weight class				Method	Round	Time	Notes
Flyweight	(Japan) Ryo Mizuno	def.	(Japan) Atsushi Tamura	Draw (split)	3	3:00
Women's Atomweight	(Japan) Kanna Asakura	def.	(Japan) Yasuko Tamada	Decision (unanimous)	3	3:00

=== Vale Tudo Japan: VTJ in Okinawa ===
VTJ in Okinawa
- Promotion: Vale Tudo Japan
- Date: October 3, 2015
- Venue: Okinawa Prefectural Budokan
- City: Naha, Okinawa, Japan

Event chronology
VTJ 7TH	VTJ in Okinawa	VTJ in Osaka (2016)

Vale Tudo Japan: VTJ in Okinawa (also known as VTJ in Okinawa) was held on October 3, 2015, at Okinawa Prefectural Budokan in Naha, Okinawa, Japan.

Main Card
Weight class				Method	Round	Time	Notes
Flyweight	(Japan) Ryota Matsune	def.	(United States) Kana Hyatt	Submission (armbar)	1	3:31
Catchweight 209 lb	(United States) Justin Morton	def.	(Japan) Ikuhisa Minowa	Decision (unanimous)	3	5:00
Flyweight	(Japan) Shinichi Kojima	def.	(Japan) Tatsuya So	Decision (split)	3	5:00
Bantamweight	(Japan) Shinya Irei	def.	(Japan) Kazuma Sone	Decision (split)	3	5:00
Flyweight	(Japan) Ryohei Kurosawa	def.	(Japan) Tomohiro Adaniya	Decision (majority)	3	5:00
Featherweight	(Japan) Wataru Miki	def.	(Japan) Keiichiro	TKO (doctor stoppage)	1	2:56
Catchweight 147 lb	(Japan) Takaaki Murata	def.	(South Korea) Kaoru Toyama	TKO (punches)	1	1:13
Lightweight	(Japan) Hisho Takeda	def.	(United States) Christopher Ike	Draw (majority)	2	5:00
Catchweight 128 lb	(Japan) Yuichi Miyagi	def.	(Japan) Good Sun	Submission (rear-naked choke)	2	1:19

=== Vale Tudo Japan: VTJ in Osaka (2016) ===
VTJ in Osaka
- Promotion: Vale Tudo Japan
- Date: June 19, 2016
- Venue: Edion Arena Osaka
- City: Osaka, Japan

Event chronology
VTJ in Okinawa	VTJ in Osaka	VTJ 8th

Vale Tudo Japan: VTJ in Osaka was held on June 19, 2016, at Edion Arena Osaka in Osaka, Japan. In the main event, Daichi Takenaka defeated Alan Philpott by rear-naked choke in the first round.

=== Vale Tudo Japan: VTJ 8th ===
VTJ 8th
- Promotion: Vale Tudo Japan
- Date: September 19, 2016
- Venue: Maihama Amphitheater
- City: Urayasu, Japan

Event chronology
VTJ in Osaka	VTJ 8th	VTJ 2021

Vale Tudo Japan: VTJ 8th was held on September 19, 2016, at Maihama Amphitheater in Urayasu, Chiba, Japan. ISAO defeated Yutaka Saito by split decision in the main event.

=== VTJ 2021 ===
VTJ 2021
- Promotion: Vale Tudo Japan
- Date: November 6, 2021
- Venue: USEN Studio Coast
- City: Kōtō, Tokyo, Japan

Event chronology
VTJ 8th	VTJ 2021

VTJ 2021 was held on November 6, 2021, at USEN Studio Coast in Kōtō, Tokyo. In the main event, Tatsuro Taira submitted Alfredo Muaiad with a rear-naked choke in the first round.
