= Takashi Nishizawa =

Japanese mixed martial artist

Takashi Nishizawa 西沢隆
- Born: Japan
- Nationality: Japanese
- Years active: 1989 - 1998

Mixed martial arts record
- Total: 3
- Wins: 1
- By knockout: 1
- Losses: 2
- By submission: 2

Other information
- Mixed martial arts record from Sherdog

Takashi Nishizawa Japanese: 西沢隆 is a Japanese mixed martial artist.

== Mixed martial arts record ==
Professional record breakdown
3 matches	1 win	2 losses
By knockout	1	0
By submission	0	2

Res.	Record	Opponent	Method	Event	Date	Round	Time	Location	Notes
Win	1-2	Seiichi Tsurusaki	KO	Shooto - Shooto	March 18, 1994	1	0:53	Tokyo, Japan	
Loss	0-2	Mamoru Okochi	Submission (triangle choke)	Shooto - Shooto	May 29, 1992	1	0:00	Tokyo, Japan	
Loss	0-1	Tadashi Murakami	Submission (achilles lock)	Shooto - Shooto	August 3, 1991	1	1:12	Tokyo, Japan	

== See also ==
- List of male mixed martial artists
