= Tomohiro Tanaka (mixed martial artist) =

Japanese mixed martial artist

- Born: Japan
- Nationality: Japanese
- Weight: 152 lb (69 kg; 10.9 st)
- Division: Lightweight
- Team: Shooting Gym Yokohama
- Years active: 1991 - 2011

Mixed martial arts record
- Total: 8
- Wins: 3
- By knockout: 2
- By decision: 1
- Losses: 4
- By knockout: 2
- By submission: 2
- Draws: 1

Other information
- Mixed martial arts record from Sherdog

Tomohiro Tanaka is a Japanese mixed martial artist. He competed in the Lightweight division.

== Mixed martial arts record ==
Professional record breakdown
8 matches	3 wins	4 losses
By knockout	2	2
By submission	0	2
By decision	1	0
Draws	1	

Res.	Record	Opponent	Method	Event	Date	Round	Time	Location	Notes
Loss	3–4–1	Ken Komoda	Submission (armbar)	Zst - Swat! in Face 9	September 11, 2011	1	0:54	Tokyo, Japan	
Loss	3–3–1	Tomonori Ohara	TKO (punches)	Shooto - Shooto	September 25, 1992	1	2:03	Tokyo, Japan	
Loss	3–2–1	Naoki Sakurada	KO	Shooto - Shooto	July 23, 1992	2	0:00	Tokyo, Japan	
Win	3–1–1	Yuji Ito	KO (punch)	Shooto - Shooto	March 27, 1992	1	0:00	Tokyo, Japan	
Loss	2–1–1	Kazuhiro Kusayanagi	Submission (armbar)	Shooto - Shooto	October 17, 1991	1	0:00	Osaka, Japan	
Draw	2–0–1	Noboru Asahi	Draw	Shooto - Shooto	August 3, 1991	4	3:00	Tokyo, Japan	
Win	2–0	Suguru Shigeno	KO	Shooto - Shooto	May 31, 1991	3	0:00	Tokyo, Japan	
Win	1–0	Masanori Yoneyama	Decision (unanimous)	Shooto - Shooto	March 29, 1991	3	3:00	Tokyo, Japan	

== See also ==
- List of male mixed martial artists
