= Yutaka Fuji =

Japanese mixed martial artist

Yutaka Fuji 富士豊
- Born: Japan
- Nationality: Japanese
- Years active: 1990 - 1992

Mixed martial arts record
- Total: 3
- Wins: 0
- Losses: 3
- By submission: 3

Other information
- Mixed martial arts record from Sherdog

Yutaka Fuji (Japanese: 富士豊) is a Japanese mixed martial artist.

== Mixed martial arts record ==
Professional record breakdown
3 matches	0 wins	3 losses
By submission	0	3

Res.	Record	Opponent	Method	Event	Date	Round	Time	Location	Notes
Loss	0-3	Kazuhiro Kusayanagi	Submission (armbar)	Shooto - Shooto	May 29, 1992	1	0:00	Tokyo, Japan	
Loss	0-2	Manabu Yamada	Submission (kneebar)	Shooto - Shooto	December 23, 1991	1	1:39	Tokyo, Japan	
Loss	0-1	Satoshi Honma	Submission (armbar)	Shooto - Shooto	May 12, 1990	2	2:36	Tokyo, Japan	

== See also ==
- List of male mixed martial artists
