= Tadashi Murakami =

Japanese mixed martial artist

Tadashi Murakami 村上正
- Born: Japan
- Nationality: Japanese
- Years active: 1991 - 1994

Mixed martial arts record
- Total: 5
- Wins: 2
- By submission: 1
- By decision: 1
- Losses: 2
- By decision: 2
- Draws: 1

Other information
- Mixed martial arts record from Sherdog

Tadashi Murakami Japanese: 村上正 is a Japanese mixed martial artist.

== Mixed martial arts record ==
Professional record breakdown
5 matches	2 wins	2 losses
By submission	1	0
By decision	1	2
Draws	1	

Res.	Record	Opponent	Method	Event	Date	Round	Time	Location	Notes
Loss	2-2-1	Mamoru Okochi	Decision (unanimous)	Shooto - Shooto	January 14, 1994	5	3:00	Tokyo, Japan	
Draw	2-1-1	Kenji Ogusu	Draw	Shooto - Shooto	September 25, 1992	3	3:00	Tokyo, Japan	
Loss	2-1	Mamoru Okochi	Decision (unanimous)	Shooto - Shooto	July 23, 1992	3	3:00	Tokyo, Japan	
Win	2-0	Tadeshi Kaneko	Decision (unanimous)	Shooto - Shooto	December 23, 1991	3	3:00	Tokyo, Japan	
Win	1-0	Takashi Nishizawa	Submission (achilles lock)	Shooto - Shooto	August 3, 1991	1	1:12	Tokyo, Japan	

== See also ==
- List of male mixed martial artists
