= Kazuhiro Kusayanagi =

American mixed martial arts fighter

Kazuhiro Kusayanagi 草柳和弘
- Born: April 15, 1967 (age 59); Japan
- Nationality: Japanese
- Height: 5 ft 9 in (1.75 m)
- Weight: 183 lb (83 kg; 13.1 st)
- Division: Middleweight; Welterweight
- Team: K'z Factory
- Years active: 1989–1998

Mixed martial arts record
- Total: 29
- Wins: 9
- By submission: 9
- Losses: 17
- By knockout: 6
- By submission: 4
- By decision: 7
- Draws: 3

Other information
- Mixed martial arts record from Sherdog

Kazuhiro Kusayanagi Japanese: 草柳和弘 (born April 4, 1967) is a Japanese mixed martial artist. He competed in the Middleweight and Welterweight divisions.

== Career ==
After a 6–9–1 career in Shooto and Lumax Cup, Kusayanagi volunteered for representing his promotion in Vale Tudo Japan in 1994. He was paired against David Levicki, a wing chun specialist that outweighed him by 90 lb. Kusayanagi charged at him with a takedown, but Levicki blocked it with help of his size and immediately started hitting the back of his head, which was legal under the rules. After dropping Kusayanagi to the ground, Levicki hit him with more punches until knocking him out. It would be Kusayanagi's only match at VTJ.

== Personal life ==
In 2019, Kusayanagi was arrested under suspicion of paying for sex with a 14-year old child in September 2018.

== Mixed martial arts record ==
Professional record breakdown
29 matches	9 wins	17 losses
By knockout	0	6
By submission	9	4
By decision	0	7
Draws	3	

Res.	Record	Opponent	Method	Event	Date	Round	Time	Location	Notes
Loss	9–17–3	Yuki Sasaki	TKO (punches)	Shooto - Las Grandes Viajes 6	November 27, 1998	1	0:46	Tokyo, Japan	
Draw	9–16–3	Larry Papadopoulos	Draw	Shooto - Las Grandes Viajes 3	May 13, 1998	3	5:00	Tokyo, Japan	
Loss	9–16–2	Carlos Newton	Submission (armbar)	Shooto - Las Grandes Viajes 2	March 1, 1998	1	2:17	Tokyo, Japan	
Loss	9–15–2	Todd Bjornethun	TKO (punches)	Shooto - Reconquista 4	October 12, 1997	2	4:01	Tokyo, Japan	
Loss	9–14–2	Masanori Suda	Decision (unanimous)	Shooto - Reconquista 3	August 27, 1997	3	5:00	Tokyo, Japan	
Draw	9–13–2	Masato Fujiwara	Draw	Shooto - Reconquista 2	April 6, 1997	3	5:00	Tokyo, Japan	
Win	9–13–1	Akihiro Gono	Submission (armbar)	Shooto - Let's Get Lost	October 4, 1996	4	2:52	Tokyo, Japan	
Win	8–13–1	Toru Koga	Submission (armbar)	Shooto - Vale Tudo Junction 2	March 5, 1996	4	2:14	Tokyo, Japan	
Loss	7–13–1	Susumu Yamasaki	Decision (split)	Lumax Cup - Tournament of J '95	October 13, 1995	2	3:00	Japan	
Loss	7–12–1	Kyuhei Ueno	TKO (punches)	Shooto - Complete Vale Tudo Access	July 29, 1995	5	1:17	Omiya, Saitama, Japan	
Win	7–11–1	Yasushi Warita	Submission (armbar)	Shooto - Vale Tudo Access 4	May 12, 1995	1	1:53	Japan	
Loss	6–11–1	Yuki Nakai	Decision (unanimous)	Shooto - Vale Tudo Access 2	November 7, 1994	4	4:00	Tokyo, Japan	
Loss	6–10–1	David Levicki	KO (punches)	Vale Tudo Japan 1994	July 29, 1994	1	1:20	Urayasu, Chiba, Japan	
Loss	6–9–1	Takeshi Tanaka	Decision	Lumax Cup - Tournament of J '94	April 23, 1994	2	4:00	Japan	
Win	6–8–1	Yasunori Okuda	Submission (armbar)	Lumax Cup - Tournament of J '94	April 23, 1994	1	1:01	Japan	
Loss	5–8–1	Erik Paulson	Submission (triangle choke)	Shooto - Shooto	June 24, 1993	3	1:46	Tokyo, Japan	
Loss	5–7–1	Yasuto Sekishima	Decision (unanimous)	Shooto - Shooto	February 26, 1993	5	3:00	Tokyo, Japan	
Loss	5–6–1	Manabu Yamada	Submission (armbar)	Shooto - Shooto	November 27, 1992	1	1:05	Tokyo, Japan	
Loss	5–5–1	Naoki Sakurada	Decision (unanimous)	Shooto - Shooto	September 25, 1992	5	3:00	Tokyo, Japan	
Win	5–4–1	Yutaka Fuji	Submission (armbar)	Shooto - Shooto	May 29, 1992	1	0:00	Tokyo, Japan	
Loss	4–4–1	Naoki Sakurada	Decision (majority)	Shooto - Shooto	December 23, 1991	5	3:00	Tokyo, Japan	
Win	4–3–1	Tomohiro Tanaka	Submission (armbar)	Shooto - Shooto	October 17, 1991	1	0:00	Osaka, Japan	
Draw	3–3–1	Kenji Kawaguchi	Draw	Shooto - Shooto	August 25, 1991	5	3:00	Tokyo, Japan	
Loss	3–3	Yuichi Watanabe	Submission (kneebar)	Shooto - Shooto	March 29, 1991	1	0:00	Tokyo, Japan	
Loss	3–2	Tomonori Ohara	KO (punch)	Shooto - Shooto	November 28, 1990	4	0:58	Tokyo, Japan	
Win	3–1	Satoshi Honma	Submission (triangle choke)	Shooto - Shooto	September 8, 1990	1	1:17	Tokyo, Japan	
Win	2–1	Kaoru Todori	Submission (armbar)	Shooto - Shooto	March 17, 1990	1	1:16	Tokyo, Japan	
Loss	1–1	Yoshimasa Ishikawa	KO (spinning back kick)	Shooto - Shooto	October 19, 1989	4	0:13	Tokyo, Japan	
Win	1–0	Naoki Sakurada	Submission (armbar)	Shooto - Shooto	May 18, 1989	1	0:00	Tokyo, Japan	

== See also ==
- List of male mixed martial artists
