= Shooto =

Combat sport and mixed martial art promotion developed in Japan

- Native name: 修斗
- Formerly: Shin-kakutōgi
- Type: Private
- Industry: Mixed martial arts
- Predecessor: Universal Wrestling Federation
- Founded: 1985; 41 years ago
- Founder: Sayama Satoru
- Headquarters: Japan
- Website: www.shooto-mma.com

Shooto (修斗)
- Focus: Hybrid
- Hardness: Full-contact
- Country of origin: Japan
- Creator: Satoru Sayama
- Famous practitioners: Satoru Sayama; Yuki Nakai; Rumina Sato; Takanori Gomi; Erik Paulson; Dave Menne; Jake Shields; Shinya Aoki; Sanae Kikuta; Caol Uno
- Ancestor arts: Shoot wrestling, Catch wrestling, Boxing, Kickboxing, Full contact karate, Muay Thai, Sambo, Judo
- Descendant arts: Mixed Martial Arts, Seikendo

Shooto (Japanese: 修斗, Hepburn: shūto) is a combat sport and mixed martial arts organization that is governed by the Shooto Association and the International Shooto Commission (ISC). Shooto was originally formed in 1985, first as a particular fighting system and then in 1989 as a mixed martial arts promotion. It is considered one of the first true mixed martial arts competitions, with its Vale Tudo Japan events being essential to the rise of Pride Fighting Championships and the development of modern MMA. Many Japanese MMA fighters had their start at Shooto, and the organization still holds both professional and amateur tournaments.

As a fighting system, Shooto is considered a hybrid martial art derived from shoot wrestling. It is focused on all aspects of fighting: striking, stand-up grappling and ground fighting. Practitioners are referred to as shooters or shootists. Shooto rules have evolved with time and differ depending on the class; Class C and D are amateur and have more restricted rules more similar to their first events, while professional classes are now true mixed martial arts competitions. Shooto weight classes are different from those of the United States Association of Boxing Commissions, which are used by most MMA promotions.

Although modern Shooto is indistinguishable from MMA, in Japan promoters, fighters and fans still see it as its own standalone combat sport, while outside of Japan it is mostly seen as a system of MMA promotions, organizing events from amateur grassroots to professional levels.

== Etymology ==
The word "shooto" (修斗) is the Japanized form of the English word "shoot", referring to shoot wrestling. Although the word is of foreign origin, it is not written in katakana, but rather with ateji. Its first kanji (修) means "to practice or train in", and the second kanji (斗) is both an obsolete unit of liquid measure of about 18 liters and an alternate written form of the word "to fight". The intended meaning is "to master fighting" (斗いを修める).

== History ==
=== Founding ===
Shooto was established as "New Martial Arts" (新格闘技, Shin-kakutōgi) in 1985 by Satoru Sayama (the original Tiger Mask), a Japanese professional wrestler trained in shoot wrestling, who wished to create a sport that revolved around a realistic and effective fighting system. Sayama was influenced by his former teacher, legendary pro wrestler Antonio Inoki, who was known for his more realistic style of pro wrestling known as "Strong Style", which mixed various styles of striking martial arts (such as karate) with catch wrestling submission grappling, taught by Karl Gotch. This style eventually evolved into the more developed "shoot-style wrestling", which was also further influenced by more martial arts such as kickboxing, muay thai, judo and sambo. It became very popular in the Japanese professional wrestling circuit, and Sayama was one of the top stars of the Universal Wrestling Federation (UWF), the leading and pioneering promotion for shoot-style professional wrestling in Japan, which he left after a dispute with its management in 1985. He would draw on the various martial arts and combat sports that had influenced shoot wrestling as a basis for his new martial art. Sayama was also inspired in the Ancient Greek Olympic sport Pankration, which mixed striking with grappling. He also founded his own school named the "Super Tiger Gym" in 1984 for training and development of this new martial art. After its establishment, New Martial Arts was renamed "Shooting" which came from "shoot", a term of professional wrestling meaning a legitimate contest as opposed to a worked match, but this changed to "Shooto" to avoid confusion with shooting sports. Compared with the other professional wrestling organizations of the time, such as the New Japan Pro-Wrestling (NJPW) and the Universal Wrestling Federation (UWF), Shooto was aimed at having no predetermined results. The first amateur Shooto competition was held in 1986, while the first professional event took place at Korakuen Hall in Tokyo in 1989.

In 1986, Sayama published "Introduction to Shooting / The Way of Shooto", a book describing Shooto covering striking, grappling and submission techniques. It is considered world's first technical MMA book.

Due to the origins in the shoot-style circuit, Shooto is considered part of the "U-Kei" system.

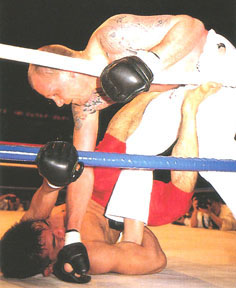
Shootist Yuki Nakai (bottom) attempts a Heel Hook at Gerard Gordeau (top) at Vale Tudo Japan Open 1995.

=== Vale Tudo Japan ===
The Shooto organization hosted the Vale Tudo Japan tournament in the summer of 1994. The objective was to create a more rules-free event similar to the Ultimate Fighting Championship in the United States and Vale Tudo in Brazil. The star of the first events was Rickson Gracie, older brother of three-time UFC champion Royce Gracie. Vale Tudo Japan was a smashing success, leading to the popularization of MMA around Japan, and its format and rules were used as a basis for Pride Fighting Championships, which would become the world's largest MMA promotion, which many Shootist would join it. Vale Tudo Japan events were held annually from 1994 to 1999. In May 2009, it was announced that Vale Tudo Japan would return for the first time in ten years on 30 October 2009.

VTJ also had a major influence on the evolution of Shooto itself. Beginning in 1994, the organization used Vale Tudo Japan as a platform for Shooto fighters to compete under a less restrictive ruleset against international opponents, particularly practitioners of Brazilian jiu-jitsu (BJJ). The success of Rickson Gracie in the first two VTJ tournaments demonstrated the effectiveness of Brazilian jiu-jitsu and exposed weaknesses in Shooto's system, encouraging Shooto fighters to develop more sophisticated ground fighting, takedown defense, and submission skills. Shooto also adopted looser rules, allowing for Ground-and-pound and other strikes when grounded. VTJ consequently helped accelerate Shooto's transition from its shoot wrestling roots toward the more comprehensive form of mixed martial arts seen today. It also established Shooto as an important talent pool for the rapidly growing Japanese MMA scene, with many Shooto and VTJ fighters later competing in promotions such as PRIDE Fighting Championships. The event ended in 1999, as Shooto officials considered its purpose fulfilled.

Vale Tudo Japan returned in 2009 after a ten-year hiatus, serving as an opportunity for Shooto officials to test potential changes to its rules, including five-round fights, smaller gloves, and knees and stomps to grounded opponents. VTJ did semi-annual events and three reunion events in 2009, 2012 and 2016. The revived series ran through 2016, and a standalone VTJ 2021 event was held in 2021.

=== Departure of Sayama ===
In 1996 Satoru Sayama left Shooto due to disagreements with the board of directors, and was succeeded by Taro Wakayabayshi. In April 1996, World Shooto, the Shooto Association and the International Shooto Commission were formed. This marked the end of Shooto as a single organization, and turned it into a combat sport with governing bodies. Since establishment of ISC, the champions of Shooto are called "World Champion".

In April 1999, Kazuhiro Sakamoto established SUSTAIN, which became the main promoter of Professional Shooto. Sakamoto had been involved in promoting Shooto events through World Shooto before founding SUSTAIN, and the promotion gradually took over the organization of major professional Shooto events. By the early 2000s, SUSTAIN was firmly established as the leading promoter of Professional Shooto, while the International Shooto Commission continued to oversee the sport's championship structure and regulations. This period marked the beginning of SUSTAIN's long-running role in promoting Shooto events in Japan.

=== International ===
Shooto was brought to America in the late 1980s by top student of Satoru Sayama, Yorinaga Nakamura. He began teaching Shooto at the Inosanto Academy in 1991, and is the instructor of Erik Paulson, Ron Balicki, Dan Inosanto, Larry Hartsell, and many others.

Shooto South America, also known as ShootoBrazil, is managed by founder of Nova União mixed martial arts academy, André Pederneiras. Its first event was held in Rio de Janeiro in May 2002 and the promotion has remained active, becoming one of the largest and most established MMA promotions in Brazil and most prominent Shooto organizations outside Japan. Over the years, Shooto Brazil has held events throughout Brazil and provided a platform for numerous Brazilian fighters who later became prominent in international MMA, including José Aldo, Renan Barão, Jussier Formiga and Alexandre Pantoja.

There has been an ongoing effort, spearheaded by Rich Santoro, to promote Shooto competition into the United States and Canada. He was officially named the Director of the International Shooto Commission - SHOOTO Americas division (the North American branch of the Shooto Association) in 2001. He has worked with both U.S. event promoters and state officials to spread the Shooto brand of competition throughout North America. As of 2006 Shooto has taken place in Indiana, Illinois, Ohio, Tennessee, Missouri, Nevada, Hawaii, and Vancouver, British Columbia. Promoters of Shooto events in North America have been HOOKnSHOOT (one of the first MMA organisations in the United States to allow Women's MMA), The Ironheart Crown, Midwest Fighting, Tennessee Shooto, RSF Shooto Challenge, TUFF-N-UFF, World Freestyle Fighting, SHOOTO Hawaii and Mannidog Productions.

In Europe, Shooto expanded through a regional structure known as Shooto Europe. Established in the early 2000s, rather than functioning solely as a single national promotion, Shooto Europe served as a broader organization representing and coordinating Shooto activities across several European countries. Individual national organizations and promoters, including Shooto Holland, Shooto Finland, Shooto Sweden and Shooto Germany, organized events within their respective countries under the wider Shooto rules and regulatory framework.

=== Rule changes ===
Previous to 2009, Shooto's rules included a knockdown rule giving knocked down fighters an eight-count to recover as well as allowing strikes to the back of the head. Shooto had argued that the potential for a knocked out (and thus unconscious) fighter to receive unnecessary damage while on the ground necessitated the rule, but with Shooto being one of the lone organizations still having the rule, consideration of the potential for injury allowing a knocked down fighter time to recover thus allowing additional blows, and with the original vision of Shooto's founder being a synthesis of striking, throwing and submitting - the rule change was instituted in mid-2008. The disallowment of strikes to the back of the head was done for similar medical reasons.

=== UFC Fight Pass broadcast partnership ===
The long-running Japanese league Shooto and sister organization Vale Tudo Japan live-streamed its first shows on UFC Fight Pass in 2016. Vale Tudo Japan bouts are contested in a cage instead of Shooto's traditional ring. Broadcast schedules for both promotions were announced 20 April 2016 during a press conference in Tokyo. Shooto made its Fight Pass debut Saturday, 23 April, with "Fight & Mosh" live from Maihama Amphitheater in Urayasu, Japan. Two world titles were on the line, Masaaki Sugawara made his first defense of the 125-pound belt against Hiromasa Ogikubo, plus Koshi Matsumoto and Yuki Kawana vied for the vacant 155-pound mantle. Shooto followed that up with events on 17 July and 12 Nov., both took place at Korakuen Hall in Tokyo as well as VTJ in Osaka" 19 June at Osaka Prefectural Gymnasium, and "VTJ 9th" on 19 Sept. which saw the organization return to its birthplace of Chiba prefecture.

=== ONE Championship partnership ===
In 2019 Shooto entered into a partnership with ONE Championship. Under the terms of the partnership, Shooto champions will have the opportunity to sign a contract with ONE, while their amateur champions will be given an opportunity to train at Evolve MMA for a year.

== Techniques and strategies ==
The aim in a shooto match is to defeat the opponent by a knockout or a submission, but fights can also end in a referee stoppage or by a judge decision. Legal techniques include general grappling, chokeholds, joint locks, kicks, knee strikes, punches, takedowns and throws. Illegal techniques include biting, elbow strikes, eye-gouging, forearm strikes, hair pulling, headbutting, kicking or kneeing the head of a downed opponent, small joint manipulation, strikes to the groin or throat and since 1 September 2008, strikes to the back of the head.

Shooto evolved in parallel with Mixed Martial Arts, including most of its techniques and strategies, to the point that both fighting styles are almost indistinguishable. However, fans, fighters and overseers still see Shooto as its own standalone combat sport.

== Fighter classes ==
Shooto fighters are categorized into four classes.

- Class-D: Amateur (2x2min, Headgear, Special point system)
- Class-C: Amateur (2x3min, Headgear, Special point system)
- Class-C+: Amateur (2x3min)
- Class-B: Pro (2x5min)
- Class-A: Pro (3x5min)

Fighters start out as Class-D or Class-C fighters and enter amateur competitions that Shooto hosts together with the help of local gyms all over Japan. Class-D Shooto does not allow knee strikes to the face or striking on the ground. Class-C Shooto does not allow striking on the ground, but knee strikes to the head are allowed. There are regional championship and once a year the All-Japan amateur championships. Then a fighter can get a Class-B pro license, these fights are 2x5 minute long and use the same rules as Class-A fights. Shooto holds yearly rookie tournaments in each weight class.

When a fighter has gathered enough wins and experience in Class-B, he will get awarded with a Class-A license; this promotion is a sign that he is part of the elite professional fighters.

== Shooto events ==
Shooto organize most of their events in Japan, although it has organized some amateur tournaments in China.

Shooto consists of a multi-layered system designed to develop fighters from grassroots level, aspirants to professional fighters must start through the organization's amateur events, winning their regional tournaments (spread out throughout all the forty-seven prefectures of Japan) and performing well on the annual All-Japan tournament. As the fighter progress they will graduate from lower classes (Class-D and Class-C) until they are graduated into the professional classes (Class-B and Class-A) and now can compete on Shooto's professional events. In Japan the sport is organized by the Shooto Association, however, the Association doesn't organize directly all events, be them professional or low-level amateur, letting gyms and independent promoters organize it.

The International Shooto Commission on the other hand, works to create Shooto organizations outside Japan. The Commission allows local independent organizations to promote their events under the Shooto name.

Domestically, it broadcasts its events over AbemaTV and Samurai TV. Internationally, it has broadcast over the UFC Fight Pass in the past, and a number of their events are part of the UFC Fight Library. Recently, they have put up their events on YouTube.

== In popular culture ==
- Manga series All-Rounder Meguru by Hiroki Endo centers around Meguru, a high schooler amateur MMA fighter which fights his way through various Shooto amateur events in order to become a professional.

== List of current Shooto champions ==
=== Current Shooto world champions ===
Men's division	Upper weight limit	Champion	Since	Title Defenses
Middleweight	85 kg (187.4 lb)	(Japan) Yushin Okami	30 November 2024	0
Welterweight	77 kg (169.8 lb)	(Japan) Ryuichiro Sumimura	3 November 2025	0
Lightweight	70 kg (154.3 lb)	(Japan) Shutaro Debana	28 July 2024	0
Featherweight	65 kg (143.3 lb)	(Japan) Keisuke Sasu	25 July 2021	3
Bantamweight	60 kg (132.3 lb)	(Japan) Kanata Nagai	21 September 2025	0
Flyweight	56 kg (123.5 lb)	(Japan) Ryoga	16 November 2025	0
Strawweight	52 kg (114.6 lb)	(Japan) Koyuru Tanoue	28 December 2024	0
Women's Strawweight	52.2 kg (115.1 lb)	(Japan) Emi Fujino	18 May 2024	0
Women's Super Atomweight	50 kg (110.2 lb)	(Japan) Ayaka Watanabe	21 May 2023	0
Women's Atomweight	48 kg (105.8 lb)	(Japan) Hikaru Aono	29 March 2026	0

=== Current Shooto Pacific Rim champions ===
Men's division	Upper weight limit	Champion	Since	Title Defenses
Middleweight	77 kg (169.8 lb)	(Japan) Yukinari Tamura	15 May 2022	0
Welterweight	70 kg (154.3 lb)	(Japan) Shutaro Debana	20 December 2020	1
Lightweight	65 kg (143.3 lb)	Vacant	N/A	N/A
Featherweight	60 kg (132.3 lb)	(Japan) Nobuki Fuji	27 November 2022	1

=== Current Shooto Brasil champions ===
Men's division	Upper weight limit	Champion	Since	Title Defenses
Heavyweight	265 lb (120.2 kg)	(Brazil) Kleberson Tavares	3 February 2023	0
Light Heavyweight	205 lb (93.0 kg)	Vacant	N/A	N/A
Welterweight	170 lb (77.1 kg)	(Brazil) Ronys Torres	25 August 2023	0
Lightweight	154 lb (69.9 kg)	Vacant	N/A	N/A
Featherweight	145 lb (65.8 kg)	(Brazil) Hermani Perpétuo	24 November 2023	0
Bantamweight	134 lb (60.8 kg)	(Brazil) Cleiver Fernandes	3 February 2023	0

== See also ==
- List of Shooto Champions
- List of Shooto Events
- Shoot boxing
- Pancrase
