= List of current mixed martial arts champions =

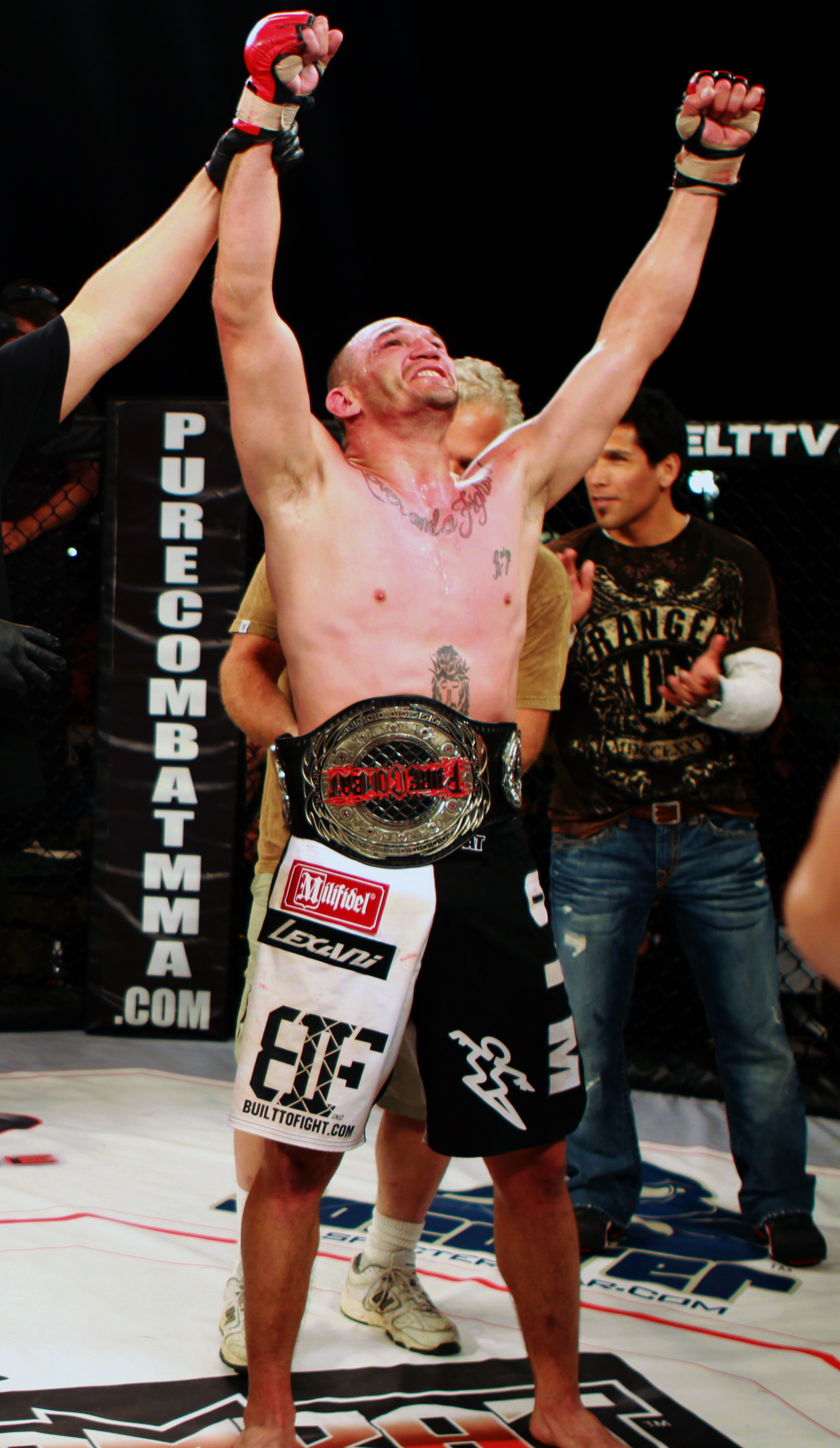
Anthony Ruiz after winning the PureCombat Middleweight Championship belt

Mixed martial arts (MMA) is a form of competitive combat sport, akin to boxing, muay thai, or kick boxing. MMA titles, or championship belts, are given to those fighters deemed by a promotional organization to have met a certain standard of athletic accomplishment in a specific weight class (most often by means of a championship fight). Championship belts are fought for at each weight class under a promotion, with only one belt awarded per class. Each belt is usually contested every time the belt holder fights, and passed to the victor of that fight (see the List of UFC champions for a chronology of UFC title belts). A belt may be vacated when a fighter leaves a promotion, or is suspended. At such times an interim champion may be crowned, or the belt may be awarded to the winner of a fight between top contenders.

This list displays all title holders for the major, certified MMA promoting and sanctioning bodies. There is no clear industry definition within the MMA community to determine which organizations are considered major promoting bodies. Due to a lack of clear guidelines, this list is limited to those organizations that are either highly regarded (such as the Ultimate Fighting Championship (UFC) and ONE Championship), long standing (such as King of the Cage (KOTC) and Pancrase), or the dominant organizations of a country or region of the world (such as England's Ultimate Challenge MMA (UCMMA) and Canada's Maximum Fighting Championship (MFC)).

Because there is no international unified MMA weight class system in use, the Nevada State Athletic Commission's (NSAC) weight classes have been adopted for this article as they are most common across major promotions. Some organizations have created titles in weight classes outside the NSAC guidelines. Those titles have been and will be recognized as subdivisions under their common weight class.

Though unofficial, Fight Matrix considered the first MMA lineal champions as follows:

- Heavyweight – Ken Shamrock beginning October 14, 1993 at Pancrase: Yes, We Are Hybrid Wrestlers 2
- Light heavyweight – Frank Shamrock beginning December 21, 1997 at UFC Japan: Ultimate Japan.
- Middleweight – Kenji Kawaguchi beginning May 18, 1989 at Shooto: Shooto.
- Welterweight – Yasuto Sekishima beginning January 13, 1990 at Shooto: Shooto.
- Lightweight – Yuichi Watanabe beginning January 13, 1990 at Shooto: Shooto.
- Featherweight – Noboru Asahi beginning March 27, 1992 at Shooto: Shooto.
- Bantamweight – Kazuhiro Sakamoto beginning October 19, 1989 at Shooto: Shooto.
- Flyweight – Kenji Ogusu beginning March 27, 1992 at Shooto: Shooto.

Although the inaugural lineal champions are sometimes contested, especially at heavyweight; the consensus view, is that all the lineal titles have been unified with their respective weight class UFC titles.

Organizations are listed by a combination of their size (number of fighters, events per year, etc.) and their history (years in existence, title lineage, etc.). Title holders from other organizations, who are now fighting in the UFC, are not included in this list as the UFC does not cross promote and these belts are often vacated.

== Men ==
=== Super Heavyweight (over 265 lb, 120 kg, No Limit) ===
Name		Organization	Date	No. of title defenses
(Brazil); Brazilian	Ronny Markes	KOTC	February 4, 2017	0

=== Heavyweight (265 lb, 120 kg) ===
Name		Organization	Date	No. of title defenses
(France); French	Ciryl Gane	UFC	September 14, 2026	1
(Russia); Russian	Sergey Bilostenniy	PFL	November 14, 2026	0
N/A	Vacant	ONE	N/A	N/A
(Russia); Russian	Evgeniy Goncharov	ACA	March 17, 2023	1
(England); English	Phil De Fries	KSW	April 14, 2018	14
N/A	Vacant	CWFC	N/A	N/A
(Lithuania); Lithuanian	Pavel Dailidko	Brave CF	September 28, 2024	2
(Republic of Ireland); Irish	Will Fleury	Oktagon	March 8, 2025	1
(Russia); Russian	Arslan Bilalov	LFA	January 16, 2026	0
N/A	Vacant	FNG	N/A	N/A
Guam	Roque Martinez (Known as Megatonweight / over 205 lb, 93 kg)	Deep	July 15, 2017	3
N/A	Vacant	Jungle Fight	N/A	N/A
(United States); American	Bailey Schoenfelder	CFFC	April 12, 2024	0
(Democratic Republic of the Congo); Congolese	Matunga Djikasa	EFC	October 6, 2022	0
N/A	Vacant	Road FC	N/A	N/A
N/A	Vacant	Titan	N/A	N/A
N/A	Vacant	Eagle FC	N/A	N/A
(Cape Verde); Cape Verdean	Yorgan De Castro	CES	May 3, 2024	0
(Brazil); Brazilian	Eduardo Neves	Centurion FC	May 18, 2024	0

=== Cruiserweight (225 lb, 102 kg) ===
Name		Organization	Date	No. of title defenses
N/A	Vacant (Known as Light Heavyweight)	ONE	N/A	N/A

=== Light Heavyweight (205 lb, 93 kg) ===
Name		Organization	Date	No. of title defenses
New Zealand	Carlos Ulberg	UFC	April 11, 2026	0
(United States); American	Corey Anderson	PFL	October 3, 2025	0
N/A	Vacant (Known as Middleweight)	ONE	N/A	N/A
(Russia); Russian	Adlan Ibragimov	ACA	December 15, 2024	0
(Poland); Polish	Bartosz Leśko	KSW	July 18, 2026	0
N/A	Vacant	Rizin FF	N/A	N/A
(England); English	Andy Clamp	CWFC	March 16, 2024	0
(Bosnia and Herzegovina); Bosnian and Herzegovinian	Erko Jun	Brave CF	September 28, 2024	0
(Republic of Ireland); Irish	Will Fleury	Oktagon	December 29, 2024	0
(Brazil); Brazilian	Bruno Lopes	LFA	September 30, 2022	1
(Russia); Russian	Vagab Vagabov	FNG	October 16, 2021	1
N/A	Vacant	Pancrase	N/A	N/A
N/A	Vacant	Deep	N/A	N/A
(United States); American	Luke Fernandez	CFFC	December 15, 2023	0
(South Africa); South African	JC Lamprecht	EFC	August 10, 2023	0
(South Korea); South Korean	Kim Tae-in	Road FC	December 18, 2022	0
N/A	Vacant	Titan FC	N/A	N/A
(Kazakhstan); Kazakhstani	Diyar Nurgozhay	Eagle FC	August 21, 2022	0
(Syria); Syrian	Tarek Suleiman	UAE Warriors	May 3, 2019	0
(Algeria); Algerian	Mohamed Said Maalem	MMA GP	Sep 16, 2023	0
(Brazil); Brazilian	Rafael Carvalho	Centurion FC	Nov 15, 2023	0

=== Middleweight (185 lb, 84 kg) ===
Name		Organization	Date	No. of title defenses
(United States); American	Sean Strickland	UFC	May 9, 2026	0
(Netherlands); Dutch	Costello van Steenis	PFL	July 19, 2025	1
(United States); American	Christian Lee (Known as Welterweight)	ONE	November 19, 2022	0
(Russia); Russian	Magomedrasul Gasanov	ACA	April 9, 2021	4
(Poland); Polish	Paweł Pawlak	KSW	June 3, 2023	2
(Italy); Italian	Dario Bellandi	CWFC	November 25, 2023	0
N/A	Vacant	Brave CF	N/A	N/A
(Czech Republic); Czech	Patrick Kincl	Oktagon	February 26, 2022	3
N/A	Vacant	LFA	N/A	N/A
(Russia); Russian	Vladimir Mineev	FNG	September 9, 2020	1
(Japan); Japanese	Yura Naito	Pancrase	March 21, 2022	0
(Brazil); Brazilian	João Batista Yoshimura	Deep	July 4, 2021	0
N/A	Vacant	Shooto	N/A	N/A
(Brazil); Brazilian	Vitor Costa	Jungle Fight	September 30, 2023	1
(United States); American	Nick Galanti	CFFC	March 27, 2026	0
(South Africa); South African	Luke Michael	EFC	March 5, 2022	0
N/A	Vacant	LUX	N/A	N/A
(South Korea); South Korean	In Su Hwang	Road FC	July 3, 2021	0
(Brazil); Brazilian	Bruno Assis	Titan	July 2, 2021	0
N/A	Vacant	Eagle FC	N/A	N/A
(United States); American	Gary Balletto Jr.	CES	July 29, 2023	0
(Iran); Iranian	Amir Fazli	UAE Warriors	May 20, 2023	0
(Nigeria); Nigerian	Daniel Emeka	AKO	Aug 19, 2023	0

=== Welterweight (170 lb, 77 kg) ===
Name		Organization	Date	No. of title defenses
(Russia); Russian	Islam Makhachev	UFC	November 15, 2025	1
(United States); American	Thad Jean	PFL	July 25, 2026	0
(United States); American	Tye Ruotolo (Known as Lightweight)	ONE	November 6, 2026	0
(Russia); Russian	Albert Tumenov	ACA	December 24, 2023	0
(Poland); Polish	Adrian Bartosiński	KSW	April 22, 2023	3
(Republic of Ireland); Irish	James Sheehan	CWFC	April 6, 2024	0'
(Brazil); Brazilian	Luiz Cado (175 lb, 79 kg)	Brave CF	October 19, 2024	0
(Moldova); Moldovan	Ion Surdu	Oktagon	June 8, 2024	0
(Brazil); Brazilian	Vanilto Antunes	LFA	March 23, 2024	0
(Russia); Russian	Dmitry Bikrev	FNG	April 6, 2019	4
(Japan); Japanese	Ryuichiro Sumimura	Pancrase	December 24, 2023	0
(Japan); Japanese	Yoichiro Sato	Deep	July 14, 2024	0
N/A	Vacant (Known as Middleweight)	Shooto	N/A	N/A
(Brazil); Brazilian	Anderson Nascimento	Jungle Fight	March 16, 2024	0
N/A	Vacant	CFFC	N/A	N/A
(South Africa); South African	Mark Hulme	EFC	April 13, 2023	1
(Mexico); Mexican	Martín González	LUX	February 13, 2026	0
(United States); American	Will Brooks	Titan	June 2, 2023	0
N/A	Vacant (175 lb, 79 kg)	Eagle FC	N/A	N/A
N/A	Vacant	CES	N/A	N/A
(Azerbaijan); Azerbaijani	Tahir Abdullaev	UAE Warriors	May 18, 2024	0
(Kyrgyzstan); Kyrgyz	Darkhanbek Ergeshev	Matrix Fight Night	March 31, 2023	1
(Brazil); Brazilian	Rodrigo Lídio	Centurion FC	Aug 24, 2024	0

=== Super Lightweight (165 lb, 75 kg) ===
Name		Organization	Date	No. of title defenses
(Bahrain); Bahraini	Eldar Eldarov	Brave CF	April 19, 2019	1

=== Lightweight (155 lb, 70 kg) ===
Name		Organization	Date	No. of title defenses
(United States); American	Justin Gaethje	UFC	June 14, 2026	0
(Russia); Russian	Usman Nurmagomedov	PFL	October 3, 2025	2
(China); Chinese	Tang Kai (Known as Featherweight)	ONE	August 26, 2022	2
(Russia); Russian	Abdul-Aziz Abdulvakhabov	ACA	September 19, 2020	3
(Brazil); Brazilian	Luiz Gustavo	Rizin FF	May 10, 2026	0
(France); French	Salahdine Parnasse	KSW	June 3, 2023	3
(England); English	George Hardwick	CWFC	July 22, 2022	2
(Kyrgyzstan); Kyrgyzstani	Abdisalam Kubanychbek	Brave CF	February 18, 2023	2
(Poland); Polish	Mateusz Legierski	Oktagon	November 22, 2025	0
(United States); American	Kegan Gennrich	LFA	January 12, 2024	0
(Russia); Russian	Alexander Sarnavskiy	FNG	February 23, 2024	0
(Japan); Japanese	Tatsuya Saika	Pancrase	March 31, 2024	0
(Japan); Japanese	Kimihiro Eto	Deep	March 9, 2024	0
N/A	Vacant (Known as Welterweight)	Shooto	N/A	N/A
(Brazil); Brazilian	Arcangelo Oliveira	Jungle Fight	August 26, 2023	1
(United States); American	Robert Watley	CFFC	July 20, 2023	1
N/A	Vacant	EFC	N/A	N/A
(Mexico); Mexican	Alejandro Flores García	LUX	August 14, 2026	0
(South Korea); Korean	Park Si-won	Road FC	July 23, 2022	1
N/A	Vacant	Combate Global	N/A	N/A
(United States); American	Richie Lewis	Titan	July 21, 2023	0
(Azerbaijan); Azerbaijani	Ramin Sultanov	Eagle FC	November 11, 2023	0
(United States); American	Charles Rosa	CES	May 3, 2024	0
(Russia); Russian	Amru Magomedov	UAE Warriors	October 17, 2023	1
(Brazil); Brazilian	Keweney Lopes	MMA GP	Jan 27, 2024	0
(Brazil); Brazilian	João Oliveira	Centurion FC	Mar 8, 2024	0

=== Featherweight (145 lb, 66 kg) ===
Name		Organization	Date	No. of title defenses
(Australia); Australian	Alexander Volkanovski	UFC	April 12, 2025	2
(Kyrgyzstan); Kyrgyzstani	Razhabali Shaydullaev	PFL	September 10, 2026	0
(Azerbaijan); Azerbaijani	Elbek Alyshov (Known as Bantamweight)	ONE	July 31, 2026	0
(Russia); Russian	Islam Omarov	ACA	July 21, 2023	2
(Kyrgyzstan); Kyrgyzstani	Razhabali Shaydullaev	Rizin FF	May 4, 2025	4
(France); French	Salahdine Parnasse	KSW	December 18, 2021	2
(England); English	Harry Hardwick	CWFC	May 25, 2024	0
(Kyrgyzstan); Kyrgyzstani	Nemat Abdrashitov	Brave CF	June 23, 2023	0
N/A	Vacant	Oktagon	N/A	N/A
(United States); American	Elijah Johns	LFA	February 9, 2024	0
N/A	Vacant	FNG	N/A	N/A
(Japan); Japanese	Suguru Nii	Pancrase	September 24, 2023	0
(Japan); Japanese	Jin Aoi	Deep	March 9, 2024	0
(Japan); Japanese	Keisuke Sasu (Known as Lightweight)	Shooto	July 25, 2021	1
(Brazil); Brazilian	Willian Souza	Jungle Fight	July 29, 2023	1
(United States); American	Jose Perez	CFFC	August 26, 2022	1
(Democratic Republic of the Congo); Congolese	Igeu Kabesa	EFC	November 3, 2022	3
(Mexico); Mexican	Irvin Amaya	LUX	November 21, 2025	0
(Jordan); Jordanian	Ali AlQaisi	Titan	August 6, 2021	0
N/A	Vacant	Combate Global	N/A	N/A
(South Korea); South Korean	Hae Jin Park	Road FC	December 18, 2022	0
N/A	Vacant	Eagle FC	N/A	N/A
(United States); American	Dan Dubuque	CES	September 9, 2022	0
(Sweden); Swedish	Samuel Bark	UAE Warriors	May 18, 2024	0
N/A	Vacant	Matrix Fight Night	N/A	N/A
N/A	Vacant	MMA GP	N/A	N/A

=== Bantamweight (135 lb, 61 kg) ===
Name		Organization	Date	No. of title defenses
(Russia); Russian	Petr Yan	UFC	December 6, 2025	1
N/A	Vacant	PFL	N/A	N/A
(Uzbekistan); Uzbek	Avazbek Kholmirzaev (Known as Flyweight)	ONE	April 29, 2026	0
(Russia); Russian	Pavel Vitruk	ACA	April 19, 2024	0
(United States); American	Danny Sabatello	Rizin FF	December 31, 2025	2
(Ukraine); Ukrainian	Vitalii Yakymenko	KSW	February 21, 2026	0
(England); English	Liam Gittins	CWFC	November 25, 2023	1
(Zimbabwe); Zimbabwean	Nicholas Hwende	Brave CF	December 13, 2024	0
N/A	Vacant	Oktagon	N/A	N/A
(United States); American	John Sweeney	LFA	June 16, 2023	0
(Kazakhstan); Kazakhstani	Sabit Zhusupov	FNG	October 14, 2022	1
(Japan); Japanese	Tokitaka Nakanishi	Pancrase	December 24, 2023	0
(South Korea); South Korean	Yoo Soo-young	Deep	September 18, 2023	0
(Japan); Japanese	Tatsuya Ando (Known as Featherweight)	Shooto	March 21, 2022	0
(Brazil); Brazilian	Tiago Pereira	Jungle Fight	June 24, 2023	1
(Albania); Albanian	Vilson Ndregjoni	CFFC	April 1, 2023	1
(South Africa); South African	Nkazimulo Zulu	EFC	July 13, 2023	0
N/A	Vacant	LUX	N/A	N/A
(Dominican Republic); Dominican	Tommy Garcia	Titan	April 14, 2023	0
N/A	Vacant	Road FC	N/A	N/A
N/A	Vacant	Combate Global	N/A	N/A
(Russia); Russian	Renat Khavalov	Eagle FC	March 19, 2021	3
(United States); American	Ashiek Ajim	CES	June 17, 2022	0
(Nepal); Nepalese	Rabindra Dhant	Matrix Fight Night	August 02, 2025	0
(France); French	Alfan Rocher-Labes	MMA GP	Sep 16, 2023	0

=== Flyweight (125 lb, 57 kg) ===
Name		Organization	Date	No. of title defenses
(Myanmar); Burmese	Joshua Van	UFC	December 6, 2025	2
(Philippines); Filipino	Joshua Pacio (Known as Strawweight)	One	March 1, 2024	0
(Russia); Russian	Kurban Gadzhiev	ACA	February 25, 2023	1
(Canada); Canadian	Tony Laramie	Rizin FF	November 8, 2026	0
(Bangladesh); Bangladeshi	Shajidul Haque	CWFC	December 31, 2022	1
(England); English	Sam Creasey	Oktagon	April 20, 2024	0
(Brazil); Brazilian	Eduardo Henrique	LFA	November 17, 2023	0
(Russia); Russian	Vartan Asatryan	FNG	February 23, 2022	0
(Japan); Japanese	Makoto Takahashi	Deep	March 1, 2020	1
(Japan); Japanese	Seiichiro Ito	Pancrase	April 3, 2024	1
(Japan); Japanese	Jo Arai (Known as Bantamweight)	Shooto	November 19, 2023	0
(Brazil); Brazilian	Wagner Reis	Jungle Fight	November 25, 2023	1
(United States); American	Israel Galvan	CFFC	March 8, 2024	0
(South Africa); South African	Nkazimulo Zulu	EFC	March 7, 2024	0
(Mexico); Mexican	Paulino Siller	LUX	February 13, 2026	0
(Brazil); Brazilian	Victor Dias	Titan	March 26, 2021	1
N/A	Vacant	Road FC	N/A	N/A
(Russia); Russian	Irgit Oveenchi	Eagle FC	August 10, 2022	0
(United States); American	Mitch Raposo	CES	November 17, 2020	0
(Brazil); Brazilian	Iago Ribeiro	UAE Warriors	May 18, 2024	0
(India); Indian	Angad Bisht	Matrix Fight Night	November 18, 2022	0
(France); French	Michael Aljarouj	MMA GP	Mar 4, 2023	1

=== Strawweight (115 lb, 52 kg) ===
Name		Organization	Date	No. of title defenses
(Japan); Japanese	Yuta Miyazawa	Pancrase	March 14, 2026	0
(Japan); Japanese	Sukai China	Deep	May 4, 2026	0
(Japan); Japanese	Koyuru Tanoue (Known as Flyweight)	Shooto	December 29, 2024	2

== Women ==
Women athletes are generally smaller than, and compete at lower weights than their male counterparts.

=== Featherweight (145 lb, 66 kg) ===
Name		Organization	Date	No. of title defenses
(Brazil); Brazilian	Cris Cyborg	PFL	December 10, 2025	1
N/A	Vacant	Invicta FC	N/A	N/A
(Japan); Japanese	Yoko Higashi	Deep Jewels	May 8, 2022	0

=== Bantamweight (135 lb, 61 kg) ===
Name		Organization	Date	No. of title defenses
(United States); American	Kayla Harrison	UFC	June 7, 2025	1
(Brazil); Brazilian	Jennifer Maia	Invicta FC	December 13, 2024	0
N/A	Vacant	FNG	N/A	N/A
N/A	Vacant	LFA	N/A	N/A
N/A	Vacant	Deep Jewels	N/A	N/A
N/A	Vacant	Pancrase	N/A	N/A
(Brazil); Brazilian	Kelly Ottoni	Jungle Fight	July 31, 2022	0
N/A	Vacant	CFFC	N/A	N/A
N/A	Vacant	EFC	N/A	N/A

=== Flyweight (125 lb, 57 kg) ===
Name		Organization	Date	No. of title defenses
(Brazil); Brazilian	Natália Silva	UFC	October 3, 2026	0
(United States); American	Jena Bishop	PFL	October 16, 2026	0
N/A	Vacant	Invicta FC	N/A	N/A
(Canada); Canadian	Shannon Clark	LFA	February 23, 2024	0
(Japan); Japanese	Rin Nakai	Deep Jewels	May 8, 2022	0
(Japan); Japanese	Fumika Watanabe	Pancrase	March 9, 2025	0
(Brazil); Brazilian	Elora Dana	Jungle Fight	March 26, 2023	2
(United States); American	Fatima Kline	CFFC	November 3, 2023	0
N/A	Vacant	EFC	N/A	N/A
N/A	Vacant	LUX	N/A	N/A
(Canada); Canadian	Corinne Laframboise	UAE Warriors	March 26, 2022	0

=== Strawweight (115 lb, 52 kg) ===
Name		Organization	Date	No. of title defenses
(Brazil); Brazilian	Mackenzie Dern	UFC	October 25, 2025	1
N/A	Vacant (Known as Atomweight)	One	June 23, 2026	0
N/A	Vacant	Invicta FC	July 16, 2024	0
(United States); American	Mallory Martin	Oktagon	October 10, 2024	1
(Brazil); Brazilian	Rose Conceição	LFA	July 7, 2023	0
(Japan); Japanese	Machi Fukuda	Deep Jewels	September 7, 2025	0
(Japan); Japanese	Miki Motono	Pancrase	December 21, 2025	0
(Japan); Japanese	Emi Fujino	Shooto	May 18, 2024	0
(Brazil); Brazilian	Laura Vasconcelos	Jungle Fight	July 20, 2024	0
(United States); American	Fatima Kline	CFFC	February 9, 2024	0
N/A	Vacant	EFC	July 15, 2024	0
(Uruguay); Uruguayan	Melany Gómez	LUX	May 29, 2026	0
N/A	Vacant	Combate Global	N/A	N/A
N/A	Vacant	Matrix Fight Night	N/A	N/A

=== Super Atomweight (108 lb, 49 kg or 110 lb, 50 kg) ===
Name		Organization	Date	No. of title defenses
N/A	Vacant	Rizin FF	N/A	N/A
(Japan); Japanese	Ayaka Watanabe (110 lb, 50 kg)	Shooto	May 21, 2023	0

=== Atomweight (105 lb, 47,5 kg) ===
Name		Organization	Date	No. of title defenses
(Brazil); Brazilian	Elisandra Ferreira	Invicta FC	September 20, 2024	0
(Japan); Japanese	Seika Izawa	Deep Jewels	March 24, 2024	0
(Japan); Japanese	Satomi Takano	Pancrase	March 31, 2024	0
(Japan); Japanese	Hikaru Aono	Shooto	March 29, 2026	0
(South Korea); South Korean	Shim Yu-ri	Road FC	September 4, 2021	0

=== Microweight (95 lb, 43 kg) ===
riaz		Organization	Date	No. of title defenses
(Japan); Japanese	Saori Oshima	Deep	September 20, 2020	2
(Japan); Japanese	Saori Oshima	Deep Jewels	May 26, 2024	0

== See also ==
- List of current world boxing champions
- List of current female boxing champions
- List of undefeated mixed martial artists
- Double champions in MMA
