= Yuji Ito =

Yuji Ito may refer to

- Yuji Ito (footballer), Japanese football player
- Yuji Ito (fighter), Japanese mixed martial artist
