= Sport en France =

French television channel

- Country: France

Programming
- Language: French
- Picture format: 1080i (HDTV); 576i (SDTV)

Ownership
- Owner: French National Olympic and Sports Committee

History
- Launched: 28 May 2019; 7 years ago

Links
- Website: Sport en France

Availability

Streaming media
- Official website: https://www.sportenfrance.com/

Sport en France (French pronunciation: [spɔʁ ɑ̃ fʁɑ̃s]) is a French free-to-air sports television channel. It was launched in 2019 and is headquartered in Boulogne-Billancourt, near Paris. In 2020, the channel signed on a content exchange program with France Télévisions.

== History ==
Sport en France was originally commissioned by the French National Olympic and Sports Committee to provide a national television platform for amateur olympic sports. Reworld Media, best known for publishing the local versions of magazines Closer and Grazia, won the tender to produce the channel's content.

However, coinciding with Sport en France's launch window, a significant consolidation of the French sports television landscape led to the channel obtaining rights to several professional sports properties, somewhat altering its mission statement and boosting its profile.

In 2019, the Ligue Butagaz Énergie (the national women's handball league) was rebuffed by outgoing broadcaster beIN Sports in its demand that production costs associated with its no-rights-fee deal be covered by the channel rather than by the league, despite the fact that beIN was ramping up its production effort for the men's counterpart, the Lidl Starligue, to the full 182-game schedule. As a result, the Ligue Butagaz Energie became the first professional league to sign with Sport en France.

In 2018, as part of a strategic realignment towards soccer, La Chaîne L'Équipe chose not to renew its modest rights-fee deal with the Ligue Nationale de Volley, leaving club volleyball without national television for the entire 2018–19 campaign (except the finals), as well as the first half of 2019–20. In early 2020, the LNV ceded its rights to Sport en France. The channel has also broadcast the CEV Champions League since the 2019–20 season (in co-presentation with Eurosport).

In 2020, Altice did not renew its €10 million-a-year domestic basketball broadcasting agreement, instead refocusing its ailing RMC Sport channels on their top subscription-driving content such as European soccer. This forced the Ligue Nationale de Basket to take a no-rights-fee deal with La Chaîne L'Équipe for its main package of games. Since the Jeep Elite was in effect giving those fixtures away for free to maintain television exposure, it opted to give another slate of games to Sport en France so as to maximize coverage. The channel also received rights to the Pro B and EuroLeague Women.

== On-demand app ==
In May 2021, Sport en France launched its iOS and Android app. The 2021 French rugby league championship final was shown live on the app, with the linear TV broadcast exclusive to select channels of the Vià network.

== Programming ==
=== American football ===
- Division 1 Elite Championship (2022-present)

=== Basketball ===
- Ligue Féminine de Basketball (2022–present)
- EuroLeague Women (2020–present) and EuroCup Women (2022–present; per event basis)
- EuroBasket Women Qualifiers (2021–22)

=== Handball ===
- LFH Division 1 Féminine (2019–present)

=== Ice hockey ===
- Synerglace Ligue Magnus (2020–present) and Division 1 (2021–present; finals only)
- IIHF Continental Cup (2023–present; per event basis)
- Olympic Qualifying Tournament (2021)

=== Mixed martial arts ===
- MMA Grand Prix (2022–present)

=== Motorsport ===
- French Rally Championship (2023–present)

=== Rugby football ===
- Super XIII (2020–present)
- RFL Super League (2021–present; tape-delayed)
- Rugby League World Cup (2021)
- Rugby Europe Sevens Olympic Qualifying Tournament (2019)

=== Volleyball ===
- LNV Ligue A Féminine (2020–present)
- Men's and Women's CEV Champions League (2019–present), lower-tier CEV club competitions (2020–present; per event basis)
- CEV Women's European Volleyball League (2021–present)

== Former programming ==
=== Basketball ===
- Betclic Élite and LNB Pro B (2020–22)

=== Volleyball ===
- LNV Ligue A Masculine (2020–22)

== See also ==
- Olympic Channel
