= Tetsuo Yokoyama =

Japanese mixed martial artist

- Born: Japan
- Nationality: Japanese
- Years active: 1989 - 1990

Mixed martial arts record
- Total: 4
- Wins: 1
- By submission: 1
- Losses: 2
- By submission: 2
- Draws: 1

Other information
- Mixed martial arts record from Sherdog

Tetsuo Yokoyama is a Japanese mixed martial artist.

== Mixed martial arts record ==
Professional record breakdown
4 matches	1 win	2 losses
By submission	1	2
Draws	1	

Res.	Record	Opponent	Method	Event	Date	Round	Time	Location	Notes
Win	1–2–1	Kengo Tsuchida	Submission (kimura)	Shooto - Shooto	May 12, 1990	3	2:42	Tokyo, Japan	
Loss	0–2–1	Kenichi Tanaka	Submission (achilles lock)	Shooto - Shooto	March 17, 1990	1	0:21	Tokyo, Japan	
Draw	0–1–1	Tomoyuki Saito	Draw	Shooto - Shooto	July 29, 1989	3	3:00	Tokyo, Japan	
Loss	0–1	Kazuhiro Sakamoto	Submission (armbar)	Shooto - Shooto	May 18, 1989	1	0:00	Tokyo, Japan	

== See also ==
- List of male mixed martial artists
