= Suguru Shigeno =

Japanese mixed martial artist

- Born: Japan
- Nationality: Japanese
- Division: Lightweight
- Years active: 1989 - 1993

Mixed martial arts record
- Total: 12
- Wins: 2
- By decision: 2
- Losses: 5
- By knockout: 1
- By submission: 3
- By decision: 1
- Draws: 5

Other information
- Mixed martial arts record from Sherdog

Suguru Shigeno is a Japanese mixed martial artist. He competed in the Middleweight division.

== Mixed martial arts record ==
Professional record breakdown
12 matches	2 wins	5 losses
By knockout	0	1
By submission	0	3
By decision	2	1
Draws	5	

Res.	Record	Opponent	Method	Event	Date	Round	Time	Location	Notes
Loss	2–5–5	Kazuhiro Sakamoto	Submission (armbar)	Shooto - Shooto	February 26, 1993	2	0:55	Tokyo, Japan	
Win	2–4–5	Hiroaki Matsutani	Decision (unanimous)	Shooto - Shooto	July 23, 1992	4	3:00	Tokyo, Japan	
Win	1–4–5	Mamoru Okochi	Decision (unanimous)	Shooto - Shooto	August 3, 1991	3	3:00	Tokyo, Japan	
Loss	0–4–5	Tomohiro Tanaka	KO	Shooto - Shooto	May 31, 1991	3	0:00	Tokyo, Japan	
Draw	0–3–5	Hiroyuki Kanno	Draw	Shooto - Shooto	January 13, 1991	3	3:00	Tokyo, Japan	
Draw	0–3–4	Hiroaki Matsutani	Draw	Shooto - Shooto	September 8, 1990	3	3:00	Tokyo, Japan	
Draw	0–3–3	Tomoyuki Saito	Draw	Shooto - Shooto	July 7, 1990	3	3:00	Tokyo, Japan	
Loss	0–3–2	Tomonori Ohara	Decision (unanimous)	Shooto - Shooto	May 12, 1990	3	3:00	Tokyo, Japan	
Draw	0–2–2	Junichi Kubota	Draw	Shooto - Shooto	January 13, 1990	3	3:00	Tokyo, Japan	
Draw	0–2–1	Tomoyuki Saito	Draw	Shooto - Shooto	October 19, 1989	3	3:00	Tokyo, Japan	
Loss	0–2	Kazuhiro Sakamoto	Submission (armbar)	Shooto - Shooto	July 29, 1989	2	0:00	Tokyo, Japan	
Loss	0–1	Mitsuo Fujikura	Submission (kimura)	Shooto - Shooto	May 18, 1989	2	0:00	Tokyo, Japan	

== See also ==
- List of male mixed martial artists
