= Kenichi Tanaka =

Japanese mixed martial artist

- Born: Japan
- Nationality: Japanese
- Weight: 139 lb (63 kg; 9.9 st)
- Division: Bantamweight; Featherweight
- Team: Shooting Gym Tsudanuma
- Years active: 1989 - 1999

Mixed martial arts record
- Total: 10
- Wins: 6
- By submission: 6
- Losses: 4
- By submission: 1
- By decision: 3

Other information
- Mixed martial arts record from Sherdog

Kenichi Tanaka is a Japanese mixed martial artist and referee. He competed in the Bantamweight and Featherweight divisions. Tanaka is one of the earliest Satoru Sayama trainees under Super Tiger Gym, and was the inaugural Shooto Lightweight 65 kg (143.3 lb) Champion. He later lost the title to Kazuhiro Sakamoto.

Tanaka refereed Seikendo events.

Tanaka is a former trainer at Shooting Gym Tsudanuma and founded and currently owns Super Tiger Gym Tanaka Juku.

== Championships and Accomplishments ==
- Shooto
  - Shooto Lightweight 65 kg (143.3 lb) Championship (One time)

== Mixed martial arts record ==
Professional record breakdown
13 matches	6 wins	4 losses
By submission	6	1
By decision	0	3
Draws	3	

Res.	Record	Opponent	Method	Event	Date	Round	Time	Location	Notes
Draw	6-4-3	Hideki Ogawa	Draw	Daidojuku - WARS 5	April 8, 1999	3	3:00	Japan	
Loss	6-4-2	Kyuhei Ueno	Decision (unanimous)	Shooto - Vale Tudo Access 3	January 21, 1995	5	3:00	Tokyo, Japan	
Win	6-3-2	Mamoru Okochi	Submission (arm-triangle choke)	Shooto - Vale Tudo Access 1	September 26, 1994	1	2:51	Tokyo, Japan	
Draw	5-3-2	Noboru Asahi	Draw	Shooto - Shooto	July 23, 1992	5	3:00	Tokyo, Japan	
Win	5-3-1	Hiroyuki Kanno	Submission (kimura)	Shooto - Shooto	May 29, 1992	3	0:00	Tokyo, Japan	
Draw	4-3-1	Noboru Asahi	Draw	Shooto - Shooto	December 23, 1991	5	3:00	Tokyo, Japan	
Loss	4-3	Kazuhiro Sakamoto	Decision (unanimous)	Shooto - Shooto	May 31, 1991	5	3:00	Tokyo, Japan	
Loss	4-2	Hiroyuki Kanno	Decision (unanimous)	Shooto - Shooto	March 29, 1991	5	3:00	Tokyo, Japan	
Win	4-1	Kazuhiro Sakamoto	Submission (kimura)	Shooto - Shooto	September 8, 1990	2	2:37	Tokyo, Japan	
Win	3-1	Kazuhiro Sakamoto	Submission (armbar)	Shooto - Shooto	July 7, 1990	1	0:00	Tokyo, Japan	
Win	2-1	Tetsuo Yokoyama	Submission (achilles lock)	Shooto - Shooto	March 17, 1990	1	0:21	Tokyo, Japan	
Loss	1-1	Kazuhiro Sakamoto	Submission (armbar)	Shooto - Shooto	October 19, 1989	1	1:30	Tokyo, Japan	
Win	1-0	Makoto Ozaki	Submission (armbar)	Shooto - Shooto	May 18, 1989	3	0:00	Tokyo, Japan	

== See also ==
- List of male mixed martial artists
