= Stephen Tapilatu =

Dutch martial artist

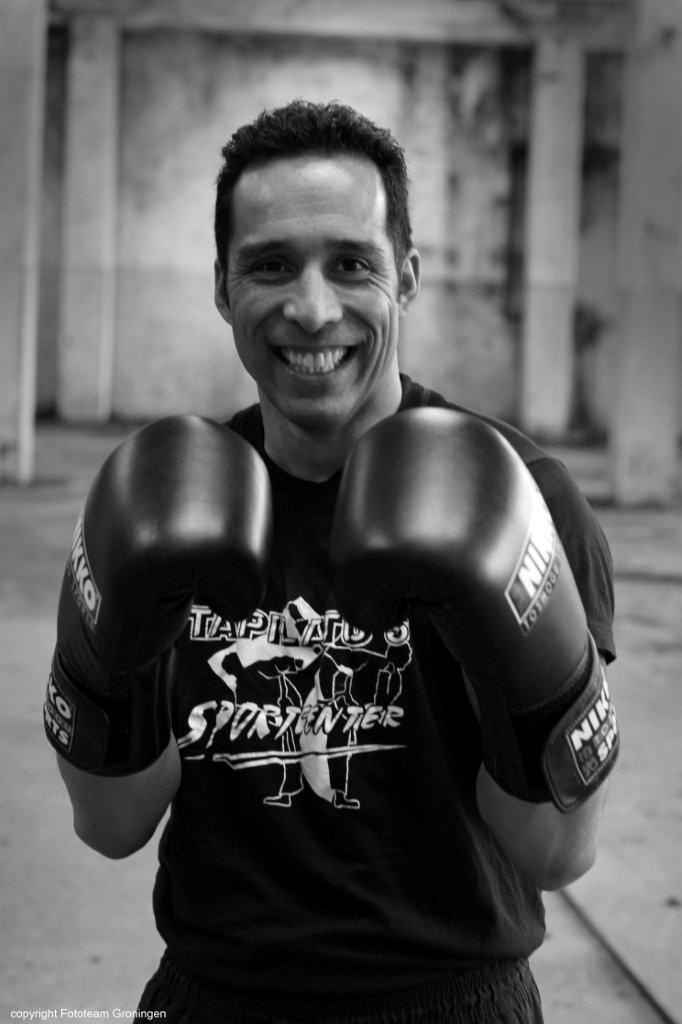

Personal information
- Nickname: The Dragon
- Nationality: Dutch
- Born: March 17, 1972 (age 54) Groningen, Netherlands

Sport
- Country: The Netherlands
- Sport: Taekwondo, MMA, kickboxing
- Rank: Teakwondo ITF 7 Dan
- Club: Sportcenter tapilatu / Teakwondo Groningen(TKDG)
- Team: Golden Glory (MMA)
- Now coaching: National team, ITF Netherlands

Achievements and titles
- World finals: Canada 1990, Malaysia 1994
- Regional finals: 1990 Davos, 1992 Koszalin
- Updated on 8 February 2013

Stephen Tapilatu (born March 17, 1972, in Groningen) is a prominent Dutch martial artist who has achieved success at the highest level primarily in ITF but also in WTF taekwondo. He began taekwondo at the age of 8 under the tutelage of his black belt father, Wijnand Tapilatu. He became ITF World Champion in 1990 and 1994 and won two European titles, in 1990 and 1992. In 1991 he won a silver medal at the WTF World Championship in Athens. Tapilatu fought his way to victory in the prestigious King of Taekwondo competition in Tokyo, Japan, in 1995 and 1996.

After completing his taekwondo career he took up kickboxing and Mixed Martial Arts (MMA), notably challenging leading figures including Dutch karate champion Ronny Rivano, Brian Lo-An-Joe and the former kickboxing world champion Perry Ubeda. From 1999 to 2008 he was a member of Team Golden Glory, alongside one of the most successful fighters of all time: Semmy Schilt.

Stephen Tapilatu is a member of a large and successful taekwondo family headed by his father Master Wijnand Tapilatu, who was a member of the winning Dutch team that took the 1984 World Taekwondo Championship. His sister Bianca and his cousins Django and Patiparu have also won many ITF titles. Bianca Tapilatu is married to Tomaž Barada, three times ITF World Champion and six times ITF European champion.

He retired from competitive martial arts in 2008. Since that time he has taught taekwondo with his father at Tapilatu's sport center in his home town of Groningen, the Netherlands. He is also much in demand as a personal trainer, and in 2012 played a key role in the return to form of the footballer Género Zeefuik, who began his career at Ajax and currently plays for FC Groningen.

Stephen Tapilatu was appointed national coach of ITF Netherlands in November 2012.

In July 2022 Tapilatu was promoted to the rank of 7th Dan black belt, joining an elite group of only 2 other ITF taekwondo practitioners currently holding this rank in the Netherlands.

== Mixed martial arts record ==
Professional record breakdown
7 matches	3 wins	2 losses
By knockout	0	1
By submission	0	1
By decision	3	0
Draws	2	

Res.	Record	Opponent	Method	Event	Date	Round	Time	Location	Notes
Win	3–2–2	Chico Martinez	Decision (unanimous)	Rings Holland: The Untouchables	September 27, 2003	2	5:00	Utrecht, Netherlands	
Draw	2–2–2	Furdjel de Windt	Draw	BOTN 1: Battle of the North 1	April 27, 2003	0	0:00	Thialf, Heerenveen, Netherlands	
Loss	2–2–1	Ronny Rivano	TKO (leg injury)	2H2H 4: Simply the Best 4	March 17, 2002	0	N/A	Rotterdam, South Holland, Netherlands	
Win	2–1–1	Brian Lo-A-Njoe	Decision (unanimous)	Rings Holland: Some Like It Hard	December 2, 2001	2	5:00	Utrecht, Netherlands	
Loss	1–1–1	Ronny Rivano	Submission (rear-naked choke)	2H2H 3: Hotter Than Hot	October 7, 2001	1	4:19	Rotterdam, South Holland, Netherlands	
Win	1–0–1	Jeffrey Heijm	Decision (unanimous)	Rings Holland: Di Capo Di Tutti Capi	June 4, 2000	2	5:00	Utrecht, Netherlands	
Draw	0–0–1	Brian Lo-A-Njoe	Draw	Rings Holland: The Thialf Explosion	October 24, 1998	0	0:00	Heerenveen, Netherlands	
