= Hiroyuki Kanno (martial artist) =

Japanese mixed martial arts fighter

- Born: Japan
- Nationality: Japanese
- Division: Featherweight
- Team: Shooting Gym Saginuma
- Years active: 1990 - 1994

Mixed martial arts record
- Total: 12
- Wins: 6
- By submission: 3
- By decision: 3
- Losses: 4
- By submission: 4
- Draws: 2

Other information
- Mixed martial arts record from Sherdog

Hiroyuki Kanno is a Japanese mixed martial artist. He competed in the Featherweight division.

== Mixed martial arts record ==
Professional record breakdown
12 matches	6 wins	4 losses
By submission	3	4
By decision	3	0
Draws	2	

Res.	Record	Opponent	Method	Event	Date	Round	Time	Location	Notes
Win	6-4-2	Hiroshi Yoshida	Decision (unanimous)	Shooto - Vale Tudo Access 1	September 26, 1994	3	3:00	Tokyo, Japan	
Win	5-4-2	Masaya Onodera	Submission (armbar)	Shooto - Shooto	April 26, 1993	2	2:31	Tokyo, Japan	
Draw	4-4-2	Kenji Ogusu	Draw	Shooto - Shooto	February 26, 1993	3	3:00	Tokyo, Japan	
Loss	4-4-1	Noboru Asahi	Submission (armbar)	Shooto - Shooto	September 25, 1992	2	1:05	Tokyo, Japan	
Loss	4-3-1	Kenichi Tanaka	Submission (kimura)	Shooto - Shooto	May 29, 1992	3	0:00	Tokyo, Japan	
Loss	4-2-1	Kazuhiro Sakamoto	Submission (armbar)	Shooto - Shooto	October 17, 1991	2	1:52	Osaka, Japan	
Win	4-1-1	Makoto Mizoguchi	Submission (armbar)	Shooto - Shooto	August 25, 1991	2	2:46	Tokyo, Japan	
Win	3-1-1	Kenichi Tanaka	Decision (unanimous)	Shooto - Shooto	March 29, 1991	5	3:00	Tokyo, Japan	
Draw	2-1-1	Suguru Shigeno	Draw	Shooto - Shooto	January 13, 1991	3	3:00	Tokyo, Japan	
Win	2-1	Masaru Yano	Submission (kimura)	Shooto - Shooto	November 28, 1990	1	0:00	Tokyo, Japan	
Loss	1-1	Noboru Asahi	Submission (armbar)	Shooto - Shooto	September 8, 1990	1	0:38	Tokyo, Japan	
Win	1-0	Tomoyuki Saito	Decision (unanimous)	Shooto - Shooto	May 12, 1990	3	3:00	Tokyo, Japan	

== See also ==
- List of male mixed martial artists
