= Hiroaki Matsutani =

Japanese mixed martial arts fighter

Hiroaki Matsutani 松谷博明
- Born: Japan
- Nationality: Japanese
- Weight: 155 lb (70 kg; 11.1 st)
- Division: Lightweight
- Team: K'z Factory
- Years active: 1990 - 1995

Mixed martial arts record
- Total: 7
- Wins: 2
- By decision: 2
- Losses: 3
- By submission: 2
- By decision: 1
- Draws: 2

Other information
- Mixed martial arts record from Sherdog

Hiroaki Matsutani Japanese: 松谷博明 is a Japanese mixed martial artist. He competed in the Lightweight division.

== Mixed martial arts record ==
Professional record breakdown
7 matches	2 wins	3 losses
By submission	0	2
By decision	2	1
Draws	2	

Res.	Record	Opponent	Method	Event	Date	Round	Time	Location	Notes
Loss	2–3–2	Yuki Nakai	Submission (heel hook)	Shooto - Vale Tudo Access 3	January 21, 1995	1	0:20	Tokyo, Japan	
Win	2–2–2	Katsuaki Yano	Decision (unanimous)	Shooto - Vale Tudo Access 2	November 7, 1994	3	3:00	Tokyo, Japan	
Loss	1–2–2	Suguru Shigeno	Decision (unanimous)	Shooto - Shooto	July 23, 1992	4	3:00	Tokyo, Japan	
Loss	1–1–2	Kazuhiro Sakamoto	Submission (armbar)	Shooto - Shooto	August 3, 1991	3	0:00	Tokyo, Japan	
Win	1–0–2	Tetsuya Hirada	Decision (unanimous)	Shooto - Shooto	January 13, 1991	3	3:00	Tokyo, Japan	
Draw	0–0–2	Tomoyuki Saito	Draw	Shooto - Shooto	November 28, 1990	3	3:00	Tokyo, Japan	
Draw	0–0–1	Suguru Shigeno	Draw	Shooto - Shooto	September 8, 1990	3	3:00	Tokyo, Japan	

== See also ==
- List of male mixed martial artists
