= Takashi Tojo =

Japanese mixed martial artist

- Born: Japan
- Nationality: Japanese
- Years active: 1990 - 1991

Mixed martial arts record
- Total: 5
- Wins: 0
- Losses: 2
- By submission: 2
- Draws: 3

Other information
- Mixed martial arts record from Sherdog

Takashi Tojo is a Japanese mixed martial artist.

== Mixed martial arts record ==
Professional record breakdown
5 matches	0 wins	2 losses
By submission	0	2
Draws	3	

Res.	Record	Opponent	Method	Event	Date	Round	Time	Location	Notes
Draw	0–2–3	Tomonori Ohara	Draw	Shooto - Shooto	August 25, 1991	4	3:00	Tokyo, Japan	
Loss	0–2–2	Yasuto Sekishima	Submission (armbar)	Shooto - Shooto	March 29, 1991	2	0:00	Tokyo, Japan	
Draw	0–1–2	Satoshi Honma	Submission (armbar)	Shooto - Shooto	November 28, 1990	1	0:00	Tokyo, Japan	
Loss	0–1–1	Yuji Ito	Submission (kimura)	Shooto - Shooto	July 7, 1990	3	0:00	Tokyo, Japan	
Draw	0–0–1	Manabu Yamada	Draw	Shooto - Shooto	March 17, 1990	3	3:00	Tokyo, Japan	

== See also ==
- List of male mixed martial artists
