= Brian Lo-A-Njoe =

Dutch mixed martial artist

- Born: 22 January 1976 (age 50); Netherlands
- Other names: Headhunter
- Nationality: Dutch
- Height: 5 ft 7 in (1.70 m)
- Weight: 155 lb (70 kg; 11.1 st)
- Division: Lightweight
- Style: MMA, Kickboxing, Boxing, Judo
- Team: Matuari; Hemmers Gym
- Years active: 1998 - 2007

Mixed martial arts record
- Total: 18
- Wins: 6
- By knockout: 4
- By submission: 1
- By decision: 1
- Losses: 9
- By knockout: 2
- By submission: 5
- By decision: 2
- Draws: 3

Other information
- Mixed martial arts record from Sherdog

Brian Lo-A-Njoe is a Dutch mixed martial artist and former kickboxer. who competes in the Lightweight division. He competed for notable organizations like It's Showtime, Shootboxing S-1 Cup, Pride FC, RINGS, Slamm and M-1 Global

== Mixed martial arts record ==
Professional record breakdown
22 matches	6 wins	13 losses
By knockout	4	4
By submission	1	7
By decision	1	2
Draws	3	

Res.	Record	Opponent	Method	Event	Date	Round	Time	Location	Notes
Loss	6-13-3	Kiefer Crosbie	TKO (ground and pound)	Centurion Fight Championship: New Era	2 July 2022	1	1:28	Fort St Elmo, Malta	Catchweight (177 lbs) bout.
Loss	6-12-3	Pieter Buist	TKO (punches)	World Fighting League MMA 2	24 March 2018	2		Almere, Netherlands	For the World Fighting League MMA Lightweight Tournament Championship.
Loss	6-11-3	Alexandre Bordin	Submission (armbar)	Centurion Fight Championship 2	4 November 2017	4	3:32	Paola, Malta	For the inaugural Centurion FC Welterweight Championship.
Loss	6-10-3	Harun Kina	Submission (leg lock)	World Fighting League MMA	27 May 2017	1		Almere, Netherlands	
Win	6-9-3	Carlos Diego	KO	ROTK 2: Return of the King 2	26 December 2007	1		Paramaribo, Suriname	
Win	5-9-3	Sergio Melo	KO	ROTK 1: Return of the King 1	26 August 2007	1	N/A	Paramaribo, Suriname	
Loss	4-9-3	Sergey Verdesh	Submission (triangle choke)	M-1 MFC: Battle on the Neva	21 July 2007	2	N/A	Saint Petersburg, Russia	
Loss	4-8-3	Oktay Karatas	Decision (unanimous)	GFN: Gentlemen Fight Night	2 June 2007	2	5:00	Tilburg, North Brabant, Netherlands	
Loss	4-7-3	Cengiz Dana	KO (liver kick)	Slamm: Holland vs. Thailand 3	6 May 2007	2	0:36	Netherlands	
Loss	4-6-3	Shinya Aoki	Submission (armbar)	Pride 34: Kamikaze	8 April 2007	1	1:33	Saitama, Japan	
Win	4-5-3	Oktay Karatas	Submission (rear-naked choke)	2H2H: Pride & Honor	12 November 2006	1	7:57	Rotterdam, South Holland, Netherlands	
Win	3-5-3	Jesse-Bjorn Buckler	TKO (injury)	Slamm: Netherlands Vs.Thailand 2	1 October 2006	1	4:51	Netherlands	
Loss	2-5-3	Sergei Bytchkov	Submission (arm-triangle choke)	2H2H 4: Simply the Best 4	17 March 2002	N/A	N/A	Rotterdam, South Holland, Netherlands	
Loss	2-4-3	Stephan Tapilatu	Decision (unanimous)	Rings Holland: Some Like It Hard	2 December 2001	2	5:00	Utrecht, Netherlands	
Loss	2-3-3	Genki Sudo	Submission (triangle choke)	Rings: Battle Genesis Vol. 8	21 September 2001	1	2:17	Tokyo, Japan	
Draw	2-2-3	Christophe Lardot	Draw	Rings Holland: No Guts, No Glory	10 June 2001	2	5:00	Amsterdam, North Holland, Netherlands	
Loss	2-2-2	Takehiro Murahama	Submission (kneebar)	Rings: Battle Genesis Vol. 7	20 March 2001	1	4:49	Tokyo, Japan	
Loss	2-1-2	Gilbert Ballantine	TKO (punches and knee)	Rings Holland: Heroes Live Forever	28 January 2001	2	2:09	Utrecht, Netherlands	
Win	2-0-2	Jassier Kaderi	KO (punches)	Rings Holland: Di Capo Di Tutti Capi	4 June 2000	1	2:12	Utrecht, Netherlands	
Win	1-0-2	Jeffrey Heijm	Decision (unanimous)	Rings Holland: There Can Only Be One Champion	6 February 2000	2	5:00	Utrecht, Netherlands	
Draw	0-0-2	Alfred Neef	Draw	Rings Holland: Judgement Day	7 February 1999	3	3:00	Amsterdam, North Holland, Netherlands	
Draw	0-0-1	Stephan Tapilatu	Draw	Rings Holland: The Thialf Explosion	24 October 1998	0	0:00	Holland	

== Kickboxing record (incomplete) ==
Kickboxing record
Date	Result	Opponent	Event	Location	Method	Round	Time
2009-05-16	Loss	(Belgium) Murat Direkçi	It's Showtime 2009 Amsterdam	Amsterdam, Netherlands	TKO	2	N/A
2007-10-28	Win	(Japan) Kenichi Ogata	Shootboxing Battle Summit Ground Zero Tokyo 2007	Tokyo, Japan	KO (right-hook)	2	0:44
Legend: Win Loss Draw/No contest Notes

== See also ==
- List of male mixed martial artists
