= Takashi Ishizaki =

Japanese mixed martial artist

Takashi Ishizaki 石崎隆
- Born: Japan
- Nationality: Japanese
- Years active: 1989 - 1993

Mixed martial arts record
- Total: 5
- Wins: 1
- By decision: 1
- Losses: 4
- By submission: 2
- By decision: 2
- Draws: 0

Other information
- Mixed martial arts record from Sherdog

Takashi Ishizaki Japanese: 石崎隆 is a Japanese mixed martial artist.

== Mixed martial arts record ==
Professional record breakdown
6 matches	1 win	4 losses
By submission	0	2
By decision	1	2
Draws	1	

Res.	Record	Opponent	Method	Event	Date	Round	Time	Location	Notes
Loss	1–4–1	Yuji Ito	Submission (kimura)	Shooto - Shooto	February 26, 1993	1	2:11	Tokyo, Japan	
Loss	1–3–1	Noboru Asahi	Submission (armbar)	Shooto - Shooto	November 27, 1992	5	0:43	Tokyo, Japan	
Win	1–2–1	Masato Suzuki	Decision (unanimous)	Shooto - Shooto	July 23, 1992	4	3:00	Tokyo, Japan	
Loss	0–2–1	Noboru Asahi	Decision (unanimous)	Shooto - Shooto	November 28, 1990	4	3:00	Tokyo, Japan	
Draw	0–1–1	Manabu Yamada	Draw	Shooto - Shooto	May 12, 1990	3	3:00	Tokyo, Japan	
Loss	0–1	Naoki Sakurada	Decision (unanimous)	Shooto - Shooto	October 19, 1989	3	3:00	Tokyo, Japan	

== See also ==
- List of male mixed martial artists
