= Mitsuo Fujikura =

Japanese mixed martial artist

Mitsuo Fujikura 藤倉光男
- Born: Japan
- Nationality: Japanese
- Years active: 1989 - 1989

Mixed martial arts record
- Total: 3
- Wins: 1
- By submission: 1
- Losses: 1
- By submission: 1
- Draws: 1

Other information
- Mixed martial arts record from Sherdog

Mitsuo Fujikura (Japanese: 藤倉光男) is a Japanese mixed martial artist.

== Mixed martial arts record ==
Professional record breakdown
3 matches	1 win	1 loss
By submission	1	1
Draws	1	

Res.	Record	Opponent	Method	Event	Date	Round	Time	Location	Notes
Loss	1–1–1	Kenji Kawaguchi	Submission (armbar)	Shooto - Shooto	October 19, 1989	2	0:41	Tokyo, Japan	
Draw	1–0–1	Yasuto Sekishima	Draw	Shooto - Shooto	July 29, 1989	5	3:00	Tokyo, Japan	
Win	1–0	Suguru Shigeno	Submission (kimura)	Shooto - Shooto	May 18, 1989	2	0:00	Tokyo, Japan	

== See also ==
- List of male mixed martial artists
