= Tomoyuki Saito =

Japanese mixed martial artist

Tomoyuki Saito 齋藤知之
- Born: Japan
- Nationality: Japanese
- Division: Bantamweight
- Years active: 1989 - 1994

Mixed martial arts record
- Total: 9
- Wins: 2
- By submission: 2
- Losses: 3
- By submission: 2
- By decision: 1
- Draws: 4

Other information
- Mixed martial arts record from Sherdog

Tomoyuki Saito Japanese: 齋藤知之 is a Japanese mixed martial artist. He competed in the Bantamweight division.

== Mixed martial arts record ==
Professional record breakdown
9 matches	2 wins	3 losses
By submission	2	2
By decision	0	1
Draws	4	

Res.	Record	Opponent	Method	Event	Date	Round	Time	Location	Notes
Loss	2–3–4	Mamoru Okochi	Submission (armbar)	Shooto - Shooto	May 6, 1994	1	2:43	Tokyo, Japan	
Win	2–2–4	Mamoru Okochi	Submission (rear-naked choke)	Shooto - Shooto	March 29, 1991	2	0:00	Tokyo, Japan	
Draw	1–2–4	Hiroaki Matsutani	Draw	Shooto - Shooto	November 28, 1990	3	3:00	Tokyo, Japan	
Draw	1–2–3	Suguru Shigeno	Draw	Shooto - Shooto	July 7, 1990	3	3:00	Tokyo, Japan	
Loss	1–2–2	Hiroyuki Kanno	Decision (unanimous)	Shooto - Shooto	May 12, 1990	3	3:00	Tokyo, Japan	
Loss	1–1–2	Noboru Asahi	Submission (armbar)	Shooto - Shooto	March 17, 1990	1	2:54	Tokyo, Japan	
Win	1–0–2	Toshio Ando	Submission (armbar)	Shooto - Shooto	January 13, 1990	1	2:48	Tokyo, Japan	
Draw	0–0–2	Suguru Shigeno	Draw	Shooto - Shooto	October 19, 1989	3	3:00	Tokyo, Japan	
Draw	0–0–1	Tetsuo Yokoyama	Draw	Shooto - Shooto	July 29, 1989	3	3:00	Tokyo, Japan	

== See also ==
- List of male mixed martial artists
