= Hamza Hamry =

Tunisian mixed martial arts fighter

Hamza Hamry حمزة حمري
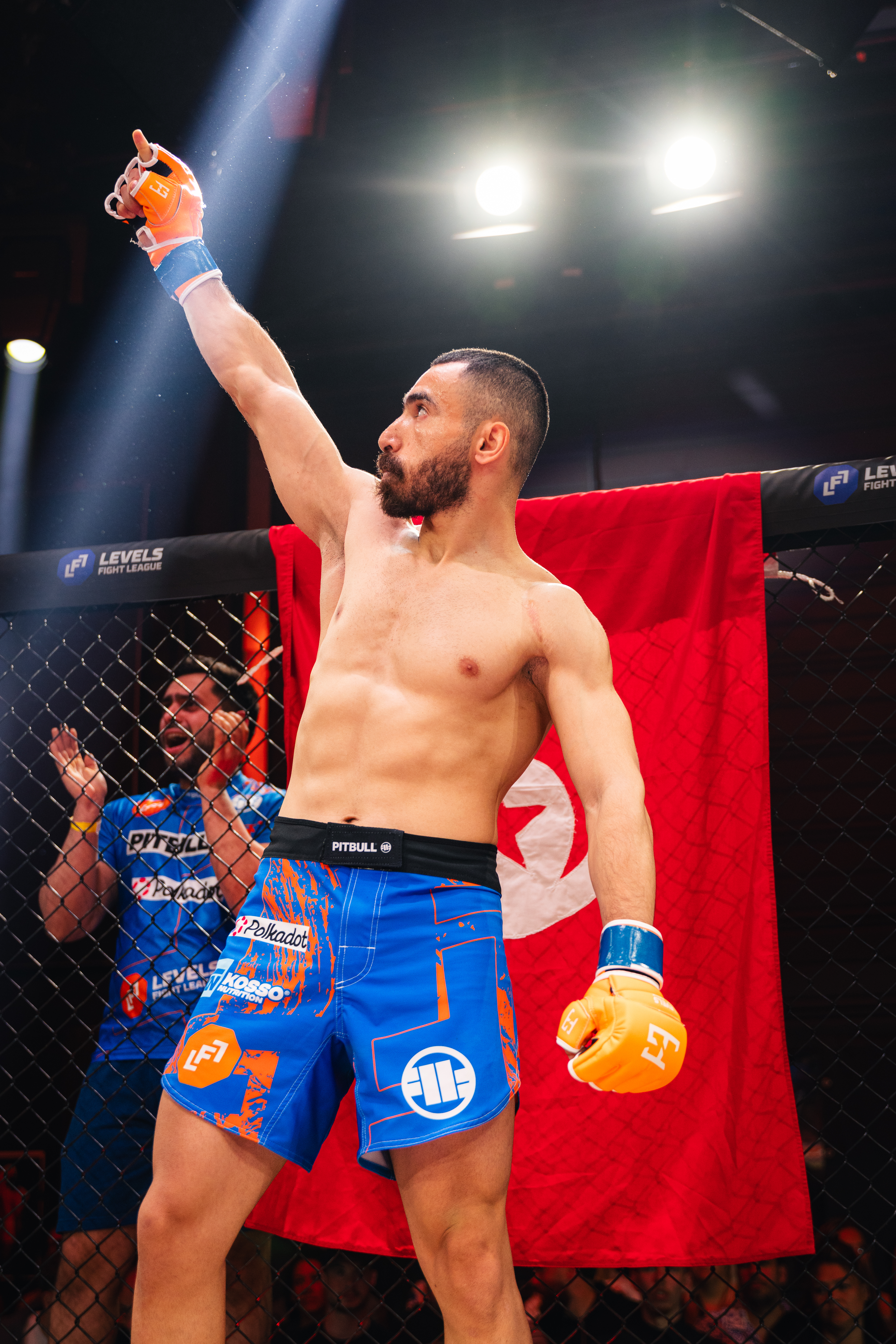
- Hamry at LFL17 in Amsterdam.
- Born: January 12, 1995 (age 31); Kairouan, Tunisia
- Native name: حمزة حمري
- Other names: The Joker
- Nationality: Tunisian
- Height: 5 ft 7 in (1.70 m)
- Weight: 135 lb (61 kg; 9 st 9 lb)
- Division: Flyweight
- Reach: 68.5 in (174 cm)
- Style: Judo, MMA, Boxing
- Fighting out of: Kairouan, Tunisia
- Team: Jackson Wink MMA Academy (2022–)
- Rank: Black belt in Judo; Blue belt in Jiujitsu
- Years active: 2007–2015 (Judo); 2017–present (MMA); 2023–present (Bare-knuckle boxing)

Mixed martial arts record
- Total: 7
- Wins: 5
- By knockout: 3
- By submission: 2
- Losses: 2
- By knockout: 2

Other information
- Website: Official Instagram Profile
- Boxing record from BoxRec
- Mixed martial arts record from Sherdog
- Last updated on: 17 July 2025

Hamza Hamry (Arabic: حمزة حمري; born 12 January 1995 in Kairouan) nicknamed The Joker, is a Tunisian professional mixed martial artist and bareknuckle boxer who competes in the Flyweight divisions of BYB Extreme Fighting Series and Centurion FC and Levels Fight League and ADXC. He is the first fighter born and raised in an Arab country to sign with BYB Extreme.

Hamry is also a former judoka.

== Background ==
Hamza Hamry nicknamed "The Joker", was born on 12 January 1995 in Kairouan.

He started sports at the age of ten, and his football experience lasted only two weeks with JS Kairouan. Then he moved to judo and discovered mixed martial arts through a YouTube video.

== Mixed martial arts career ==
=== Early career ===
Hamry made his MMA debut 2017 at BFC Algerie, being scheduled to fight Mourad Zaidi. He won the fight by a TKO in the first round.

He was next scheduled to fight Firas Atig at Tataouine Championship, after five years his professional debut. He won the fight by TKO in the first round.

Hamry faced Read El Zanati on 1 April 2022 at Libya Combat Organization. He won the fight via first round TKO.

The fourth battle took place on 15 June 2022 against the Brazilian Dorthy Lucas in Libya, As usual, he dominated the match from the first round, taking advantage of subduing his opponent on the ground And thus made Hamza achieve his fourth victory in a row and Wins the lightweight belt for the International Libya Championship.

=== Training ===
Hamza is considered the first Tunisian and Arab fighter to join the American Academy, Jackson Wink, and he is one of the best mixed martial arts academy in the world.

=== Centurion FC ===
Hamry faced Patrizio de Souza on November 15, 2023 at CFC 16. He lost the fight via a TKO (Punches) in the first round.

=== Levels Fight League ===
Hamry faced Duane van Helvoirt on April 13, 2025 at LFL17. He lost the fight via a TKO (Elbows) in the first round.

=== Hexagone MMA ===
On June 24, 2025, it was announced that Hamry signed a three-fight contract with Hexagone MMA. His first fight is scheduled to take place on September 19, 2025, in Paris.

== Championships and achievements ==
=== Mixed martial arts ===
- Libya Combat Championship
  - LBA Combat Lightweight Champion (One Time)

=== Grappling ===
- ADCC
  - ADCC African Champion - (-70 kg) Super Fight

=== Judo ===
- Medal Bronze in Tunisian Judo Championship - semi pro (-66 kg) 2013
- Medal Gold in Tunisian Judo Championship - semi pro (-66 kg) 2014

== Mixed martial arts record ==
Professional record breakdown
7 matches	5 wins	2 losses
By knockout	3	2
By submission	2	0

Res.	Record	Opponent	Method	Event	Date	Round	Time	Location	Notes
Win	5–2	Albert Dolisso	Submission (heel hook)	Porto MMA Clash 1	July 15, 2025	1	2:17	Porto, Portugal	
Loss	4–2	Duane van Helvoirt	TKO (elbows)	Levels Fight League 17	April 13, 2025	1	0:58	Amsterdam, Netherlands	Return to Featherweight.
Loss	4–1	Patrizio de Souza	TKO (punches)	Centurion FC 16	November 15, 2023	1	1:42	Attard, Malta	Catchweight (150 lb) bout.
Win	4–0	Dorthy Lucas	Submission (rear-naked choke)	Libya Combat 3	June 15, 2022	1	3:09	Tripoli, Libya	Won the inaugural LBA Combat Lightweight Championship.
Win	3–0	Read El Zanati	TKO (leg injury)	Libya Combat 01	April 1, 2022	1	1:14	Tripoli, Libya	
Win	2–0	Firas Atig	TKO (leg kicks)	Tataouine 1	March 12, 2022	1	2:21	Tataouine, Tunisia	Lightweight debut.
Win	1–0	Mourad Zaidi	TKO (punches)	BFC Algerie: Tunisia	April 16, 2017	1	1:45	Tunis, Tunisia	Featherweight debut.

== Professional grappling career ==
Hamry is scheduled to compete against UAE Warriors Featherweight Africa Champion Jaures Dea in a No-Gi Lightweight grappling match on October 25, 2024 in the prelims event at ADXC6.

== Bare-knuckle boxing career ==
=== BYB Extreme Fighting Series ===
On February 10, 2023, it was announced that Hamry signed a three-fights contract with BYB Extreme Fighting Series. he is the first fighter that was born and raised in an Arab country to be signed with BYB.

Hamry faced Mark Tiffin on March 18, 2023 at BYB 16: Desert Brawl. He lost the fight via first round TKO.

In April 2023, Hamza was ranked No. 1 in Tunisia on the BoxRec website.

== Bare knuckle boxing record ==
1 fight	0 wins	1 loss
By knockout	0	1

No.	Result	Record	Opponent	Method	Round, time	Date	Location	Notes
1	Loss	0–1	(United Kingdom) Mark Tiffin	TKO	1	March 18, 2023	Dubai Duty Free Tennis Stadium, Dubai, United Arab Emirates, UAE	Bare knuckle boxing debut.

== See also ==
- List of male mixed martial artists
