= 1989 in Shooto =

Mixed martial arts events

Information
- First date: May 18, 1989
- Last date: October 19, 1989

Events
- Total events: 3

Fights
- Total fights: 19

Chronology
1989 in Shooto	1990 in Shooto

The year 1989 is the 1st year in the history of Shooto, a mixed martial arts promotion based in the Japan. In 1989 Shooto held 3 events beginning with, Shooto: Shooto.

== Events list ==
#	Event Title	Date	Arena	Location
3	Shooto: Shooto (October)	October 19, 1989	Korakuen Hall	Tokyo, Japan
2	Shooto: Shooto (July)	July 29, 1989	Yoyogi National Stadium Second Gymnasium	Tokyo, Japan
1	Shooto: Shooto (May)	May 18, 1989	Korakuen Hall	Tokyo, Japan

== Shooto: Shooto (May) ==
Shooto: Shooto was an event held on May 18, 1989, at Korakuen Hall in Tokyo, Japan.

=== Results ===
Main Card
Weight class				Method	Round	Time	Notes
	Yuichi Watanabe	def.	Yuji Ito	Submission (Armbar)	1	0:00
	Kazuhiro Sakamoto	def.	Tetsuo Yokoyama	Submission (Armbar)	1	0:00
	Kazuhiro Kusayanagi	def.	Naoki Sakurada	Submission (Armbar)	1	0:00
	Kenji Kawaguchi	def.	Tadashi Yokoyama	Submission (Kneebar)	1	0:00
	Mitsuo Fujikura	def.	Suguru Shigeno	Submission (Kimura)	2	0:00
	Yasushi Maeda	def.	Hiroshi Matsuoka	Submission (Armbar)	2	0:00
	Kenichi Tanaka	def.	Makoto Ozaki	Submission (Armbar)	3	0:00

== Shooto: Shooto (July) ==
Shooto: Shooto was an event held on July 29, 1989, at The Yoyogi National Stadium Second Gymnasiu in Tokyo, Japan.

=== Results ===
Main Card
Weight class				Method	Round	Time	Notes
	Mitsuo Fujikura	vs.	Yasuto Sekishima	Draw	5	3:00
	Naoki Sakurada	def.	Unknown Fighter	Submission (Heel Hook)	1	0:00
	Kazuhiro Sakamoto	def.	Suguru Shigeno	Submission (Armbar)	2	0:00
	Kenji Kawaguchi	vs.	Yuji Ito	Draw	4	3:00
	Hidehiko Satake	def.	Kazuyuki Itagaki	Submission (Rear-Naked Choke)	1	0:00
	Tetsuo Yokoyama	vs.	Tomoyuki Saito	Draw	3	3:00

== Shooto: Shooto (October) ==
Shooto: Shooto was an event held on October 19, 1989, at Korakuen Hall in Tokyo, Japan.

=== Results ===
Main Card
Weight class				Method	Round	Time	Notes
	Yasuto Sekishima	def.	Yuji Ito	Submission (Armbar)	4	2:01
	Kenji Kawaguchi	def.	Mitsuo Fujikura	Submission (Armbar)	2	0:41
	Kazuhiro Sakamoto	def.	Kenichi Tanaka	Submission (Armbar)	1	1:30
	Yoshimasa Ishikawa	def.	Kazuhiro Kusayanagi	KO (Spinning Back Kick)	4	0:13
	Naoki Sakurada	def.	Takashi Ishizaki	Decision (Unanimous)	3	3:00
	Tomoyuki Saito	vs.	Suguru Shigeno	Draw	3	3:00

== See also ==
- Shooto
- List of Shooto champions
- List of Shooto Events
