= Noboru Asahi =

Japanese mixed martial arts fighter

Noboru Asahi 朝日 昇
- Born: Shin'ichi Asahi; January 5, 1968 (age 58); Yokohama, Kanagawa, Japan
- Other names: Kijin (奇人, The Strange Man)
- Nationality: Japanese
- Height: 1.62 m (5 ft 4 in)
- Weight: 66 kg (146 lb; 10.4 st)
- Division: Featherweight; Lightweight
- Fighting out of: Kita, Tokyo, Japan
- Team: Purebred Ōmiya (1990-2001); Tokyo Yellowmans (2001-current)
- Trainer: Satoru Sayama
- Years active: 13 (1990-2003)

Mixed martial arts record
- Total: 30
- Wins: 19
- By submission: 14
- By decision: 5
- Losses: 6
- By knockout: 1
- By submission: 3
- By decision: 2
- Draws: 5

Other information
- Website: http://www.tacox.jp/index.html
- Mixed martial arts record from Sherdog
- Last updated on: January 2, 2010

Noboru Asahi (Japanese: 朝日 昇, Asahi Noboru; born January 5, 1968) is a Japanese retired mixed martial artist, a designer, and an owner of MMA gym.

He was born in Yokohama, Kanagawa, Japan on January 5, 1968, as Shin'ichi Asahi (Japanese: 朝日 愼一, Asahi Shin'ichi).

== Mixed martial arts career ==
A former Wrestler, Asahi was trained in Satoru Sayama's Super Tiger Gym, where he learned Shootfighting, and later moved to Noriaki Kiguchi's dojo to polish his skills. He made his debut in Shooto in 1992 submitting Tomoyuki Saito. Showing his grappling excellence, Noboru captured the Shooto Featherweight Championship from Kazuhiro Sakamoto and enjoyed a thirteen-fights winning streak, with victories over Yuki Nakai and Masato Suzuki, as well as Brazilian Jiu-Jitsu grappler Leandro Lima de Azevedo.

His streak snapped, however, when he was sent to the 1996 Vale Tudo Japan and fought another Brazilian Jiu-Jitsu specialist Royler Gracie. Asahi was taken down and held in side control, ending up with Gracie taking his back; he eventually escaped, but the game repeated itself and he got caught in a rear naked choke, being submitted. At the next Shooto event, Asahi lost to Alexandre Franca Nogueira by technical submission due to Nogueira's famed guillotine choke. Noboru did better in the next VTJ, fighting to a draw with yet another BJJ expert in the form of João Roque, but he fell again to Nogueira in a much longer fight, losing his title.

In 2001, Asahi retired from Shooto and founded the Tokyo Yellowmans gym.

== Mixed martial arts record ==
Professional record breakdown
30 matches	19 wins	6 losses
By knockout	0	1
By submission	14	3
By decision	5	2
Draws	5	

Res.	Record	Opponent	Method	Event	Date	Round	Time	Location	Notes
Loss	19-6-5	Tomomi Iwama	TKO (punches)	Deep - 10th Impact	June 25, 2003	3	0:42	Japan	
Loss	19-5-5	Naoya Uematsu	Decision (2-0)	Shooto - R.E.A.D. 10	September 15, 2000	3	5:00	Japan	
Loss	19-4-5	Alexandre Franca Nogueira	Technical submission (guillotine choke)	Shooto - Renaxis 4	September 5, 1999	2	3:29	Japan	Losses title of Shooto World Lightweight Championship.
Draw	19-4-4	Uchu Tatsumi	Decision (1-1)	Shooto - Renaxis 1	March 28, 1999	3	5:00	Japan	Retains title of Shooto World Lightweight Championship.(2)
Draw	19-4-3	João Roque	Draw	Vale Tudo Japan 1998	October 25, 1998	3	8:00	Japan	
Win	18-4-3	Trent Bekis	Submission (keylock)	Shooto - Las Grandes Viajes 5	August 29, 1998	1	3:01	Japan	
Loss	18-3-3	Alexandre Franca Nogueira	Technical submission (guillotine choke)	Shooto - Shoot the Shooto XX	April 26, 1998	1	1:06	Japan	
Win	18-2-2	Dennis Hall	Submission (armbar)	Shooto - Las Grandes Viajes 1	January 17, 1998	2	4:18	Japan	
Loss	17-2-2	Royler Gracie	Submission (rear-naked choke)	Vale Tudo Japan 1996	July 7, 1996	1	5:07	Japan	
Win	17-1-2	Leandro Lima De Azevedo	Technical submission (heel hook)	Shooto - Vale Tudo Junction 2	March 5, 1996	1	1:04	Japan	
Win	16-1-2	Ruud Alwart	Submission (punches)	Shooto - Vale Tudo Junction 1	January 20, 1996	1	1:21	Japan	
Win	15-1-2	Anthony Lange	Submission (armbar)	Shooto - Vale Tudo Perception	September 26, 1995	1	3:41	Japan	
Win	14-1-2	Leonid Zaslavsky	Submission (heel hook)	Shooto - Complete Vale Tudo Access	July 29, 1995	3	0:48	Japan	
Win	13-1-2	Kyuhei Ueno	Decision (unanimous)	Shooto - Vale Tudo Access 2	November 7, 1994	5	3:00	Japan	
Win	12-1-2	Nozomu Matsumoto	Submission (keylock)	Shooto - Vale Tudo Access 1	September 26, 1994	1	0:13	Japan	
Win	11-1-2	Shinji Abe	Submission (rear-naked choke)	Shooto - Shooto	May 6, 1994	1	0:41	Japan	
Win	10-1-2	Yuki Nakai	Decision (2-0)	Shooto - Shooto	November 25, 1993	5	3:00	Japan	
Win	9-1-2	Masato Suzuki	Submission (armbar)	Shooto - Shooto	June 24, 1993	5	1:39	Japan	
Win	8-1-2	Takashi Ishizaki	Submission (armbar)	Shooto - Shooto	November 27, 1992	5	0:43	Japan	
Win	7-1-2	Hiroyuki Kanno	Submission (armbar)	Shooto - Shooto	September 25, 1992	2	1:05	Japan	
Draw	6-1-3	Kenichi Tanaka	Decision (0-0)	Shooto - Shooto	July 23, 1992	5	3:00	Japan	Asahi fought to a draw with Tanaka to remain the Shooto Featherweight Champion.
Win	6-1-2	Kazuhiro Sakamoto	Decision (2-0)	Shooto - Shooto	March 27, 1992	5	3:00	Japan	Asahi defeated Sakamoto to become the Shooto Featherweight Champion.
Draw	5-1-2	Kenichi Tanaka	Decision (0-0)	Shooto - Shooto	December 23, 1991	5	3:00	Japan	
Win	5-1-1	Masato Suzuki	Submission (kneebar)	Shooto - Shooto	October 17, 1991	1	?	Japan	
Draw	4-1-1	Tomohiro Tanaka	Decision (1-0)	Shooto - Shooto	August 3, 1991	4	3:00	Japan	
Loss	4-1	Kazuhiro Sakamoto	Decision (unanimous)	Shooto - Shooto	March 29, 1991	5	3:00	Japan	
Win	4-0	Takashi Ishizaki	Decision (unanimous)	Shooto - Shooto	November 28, 1990	4	3:00	Japan	
Win	3-0	Hiroyuki Kanno	Submission (armbar)	Shooto - Shooto	September 8, 1990	1	0:38	Japan	
Win	2-0	Kazumi Chigira	Decision (unanimous)	Shooto - Shooto	July 7, 1990	3	3:00	Japan	
Win	1-0	Tomoyuki Saito	Submission (armbar)	Shooto - Shooto	March 17, 1990	1	2:54	Japan	

=== Mixed martial arts exhibition record ===
Exhibition record breakdown		
0 matches	0 wins	0 losses
By knockout	0	0
By submission	0	0
By decision	0	0

Res.	Record	Opponent	Method	Event	Date	Round	Time	Location	Notes
Draw	0-0-1	Manabu Yamada	Technical Draw	Pancrase - Proof 3	May 13, 2001	1	5:00	Tokyo, Japan	

== Submission grappling record ==
KO PUNCHES

Result	Opponent	Method	Event	Date	Round	Time	Notes
Loss	(Japan) Hidehiko Matsumoto	Points	ZST GT-F	2004			

== See also ==
- Shooto
- List of Shooto champions
- List of male mixed martial artists

Sporting positions
Preceded by Kazuhiro Sakamoto	3rd Shooto World Lightweight Champion; March 27, 1992 – September 5, 1999	Succeeded by Alexandre Franca Nogueira
