= Kazuhiro Sakamoto =

Japanese mixed martial artist

Kazuhiro Sakamoto 坂本和弘
- Born: Japan
- Nationality: Japanese
- Weight: 139 lb (63 kg; 9.9 st)
- Division: Bantamweight; Featherweight
- Team: Shooting Gym Yokohama
- Years active: 1989 - 1995

Mixed martial arts record
- Total: 17
- Wins: 13
- By submission: 11
- By decision: 2
- Losses: 4
- By submission: 3
- By decision: 1

Other information
- Mixed martial arts record from Sherdog

Kazuhiro Sakamoto Japanese: 坂本和弘 is a Japanese mixed martial artist. He competed in the Bantamweight and Featherweight divisions. Sakamoto is a longtime Shooto and Vale Tudo Japan veteran and currently serves as a representative and promoter for Shooto and Vale Tudo Japan.

== Career ==
Sakamoto trained in amateur wrestling before becoming a trainee under Satoru Sayama at the Super Tiger Gym. He was the lightweight champion of the second pre-shooting tournament. He was a frequent opponent of Kenichi Tanaka, another Sayama trainee whom he fought and eventually captured the Shooto Lightweight 65 kg (143.3 lb) Championship from.

He is now a head trainer at Shooting Gym Tokyo.

Sakamoto currently coaches current Rizin FF fighter Kazuma Kuramoto.

== Championships and Accomplishments ==
- Shooto
  - Shooto Lightweight 65 kg (143.3 lb) Championship (One time)
    - One successful title defense

== Mixed martial arts record ==
Professional record breakdown
17 matches	13 wins	4 losses
By submission	11	3
By decision	2	1

Res.	Record	Opponent	Method	Event	Date	Round	Time	Location	Notes
Win	13–4	Leonid Zaslavsky	Submission (rear-naked choke)	Shooto - Vale Tudo Perception	September 26, 1995	1	2:11	Tokyo, Japan	
Win	12–4	Rene Stigter	Submission (armbar)	Shooto - Vale Tudo Access 4	May 12, 1995	1	1:47	Japan	
Win	11–4	Imre Hagendoorn	Submission (armbar)	Shooto - Vale Tudo Access 3	January 21, 1995	1	0:45	Tokyo, Japan	
Win	10–4	Akbar Talei	Submission (kimura)	Shooto - Shooto	May 6, 1994	1	2:35	Tokyo, Japan	
Win	9–4	Mamoru Okochi	Submission (kimura)	Shooto - Shooto	April 26, 1993	3	0:35	Tokyo, Japan	
Win	8–4	Suguru Shigeno	Submission (armbar)	Shooto - Shooto	February 26, 1993	2	0:55	Tokyo, Japan	
Loss	7–4	Noboru Asahi	Decision (majority)	Shooto - Shooto	March 27, 1992	5	3:00	Tokyo, Japan	
Win	7–3	Hiroyuki Kanno	Submission (armbar)	Shooto - Shooto	October 17, 1991	2	1:52	Osaka, Japan	
Win	6–3	Hiroaki Matsutani	Submission (armbar)	Shooto - Shooto	August 3, 1991	3	0:00	Tokyo, Japan	
Win	5–3	Kenichi Tanaka	Decision (unanimous)	Shooto - Shooto	May 31, 1991	5	3:00	Tokyo, Japan	
Win	4–3	Noboru Asahi	Decision (unanimous)	Shooto - Shooto	March 29, 1991	5	3:00	Tokyo, Japan	
Loss	3–3	Kenichi Tanaka	Submission (kimura)	Shooto - Shooto	September 8, 1990	2	2:37	Tokyo, Japan	
Loss	3–2	Kenichi Tanaka	Submission (armbar)	Shooto - Shooto	July 7, 1990	1	0:00	Tokyo, Japan	
Loss	3–1	Yuichi Watanabe	Submission (armbar)	Shooto - Shooto	January 13, 1990	2	2:54	Tokyo, Japan	
Win	3–0	Kenichi Tanaka	Submission (armbar)	Shooto - Shooto	October 19, 1989	1	1:30	Tokyo, Japan	
Win	2–0	Suguru Shigeno	Submission (armbar)	Shooto - Shooto	July 29, 1989	2	0:00	Tokyo, Japan	
Win	1–0	Tetsuo Yokoyama	Submission (armbar)	Shooto - Shooto	May 18, 1989	1	0:00	Tokyo, Japan	

== See also ==
- List of male mixed martial artists
