= Yuji Ito (fighter) =

Japanese mixed martial artist

Yuji Ito 伊藤裕二
- Born: Japan
- Weight: 152 lb (69 kg; 10.9 st)
- Division: Lightweight
- Years active: 1989–1993

Mixed martial arts record
- Total: 12
- Wins: 5
- By knockout: 2
- By submission: 2
- By decision: 1
- Losses: 4
- By knockout: 2
- By submission: 2
- Draws: 3

Other information
- Mixed martial arts record from Sherdog

Yuji Ito Japanese: 伊藤裕二 is a Japanese former mixed martial artist He competed in the Lightweight division.

== Mixed martial arts record ==
Professional record breakdown
| 12 matches | 5 wins | 4 losses |
| By knockout | 2 | 2 |
| By submission | 2 | 2 |
| By decision | 1 | 0 |
| No contests | 3 | |

| Res. | Record | Opponent | Method | Event | Date | Round | Time | Location | Notes |
|---|---|---|---|---|---|---|---|---|---|
| Win | 5–4–3 | Yasunori Okuda | TKO (retirement) | Shooto - Shooto | November 25, 1993 | 2 | 3:00 | Tokyo, Japan | |
| Draw | 4–4–3 | Yasuto Sekishima | Draw | Shooto - Shooto | April 26, 1993 | 5 | 3:00 | Tokyo, Japan | |
| Win | 4–4–2 | Takashi Ishizaki | Submission (kimura) | Shooto - Shooto | February 26, 1993 | 1 | 2:11 | Tokyo, Japan | |
| Win | 3–4–2 | Tomonori Ohara | Decision (unanimous) | Shooto - Shooto | November 27, 1992 | 5 | 3:00 | Tokyo, Japan | |
| Loss | 2–4–2 | Tomohiro Tanaka | KO (punch) | Shooto - Shooto | March 27, 1992 | 1 | 0:00 | Tokyo, Japan | |
| Loss | 2–3–2 | Kenji Kawaguchi | KO (punches) | Shooto - Shooto | November 28, 1990 | 3 | 0:37 | Tokyo, Japan | |
| Draw | 2–2–2 | Naoki Sakurada | Draw | Shooto - Shooto | September 8, 1990 | 5 | 3:00 | Tokyo, Japan | |
| Win | 2–2–1 | Takashi Tojo | Submission (kimura) | Shooto - Shooto | July 7, 1990 | 3 | 0:00 | Tokyo, Japan | |
| Win | 1–2–1 | Yuichi Watanabe | TKO (punches) | Shooto - Shooto | May 12, 1990 | 3 | 1:49 | Tokyo, Japan | |
| Loss | 0–2–1 | Yasuto Sekishima | Submission (armbar) | Shooto - Shooto | October 19, 1989 | 4 | 2:01 | Tokyo, Japan | |
| Draw | 0–1–1 | Kenji Kawaguchi | Draw | Shooto - Shooto | July 29, 1989 | 4 | 3:00 | Tokyo, Japan | |
| Loss | 0–1 | Yuichi Watanabe | Submission (armbar) | Shooto - Shooto | May 18, 1989 | 1 | 0:00 | Tokyo, Japan | |

== See also ==
- List of male mixed martial artists
