= 1990 in Shooto =

Mixed martial arts events

Information
- First date: January 13, 1990
- Last date: November 28, 1990

Events
- Total events: 6

Fights
- Total fights: 37
- Title fights: 3

Chronology
1989 in Shooto	1990 in Shooto	1991 in Shooto

The year 1990 is the 2nd year in the history of Shooto, a mixed martial arts promotion based in the Japan. In 1990 Shooto held 6 events beginning with, Shooto: Shooto.

== Title fights ==
Title fights in 1990
Weight class				Method	Round	Time	Event	Notes
Welterweight	Yasuto Sekishima	def.	Yoshimasa Ishikawa	Submission (Rear-Naked Choke)	1	1:49	Shooto: Shooto (May)	(Note: Sekishima defeated Ishikawa to become the inaugural Shooto Welterweight Champion.)
Featherweight	Kenichi Tanaka	def.	Kazuhiro Sakamoto	Submission (Kimura)	2	2:37	Shooto: Shooto (September)	(Note: Tanaka defeated Sakamoto to become the inaugural Shooto Featherweight Champion.)
Welterweight	Yasuto Sekishima (c)	vs.	Naoki Sakurada	Draw	5	3:00	Shooto: Shooto (November)	(Note: Sekishima fought Sakurada to a draw to remain the Shooto Welterweight Champion.)

== Events list ==
#	Event title	Date	Arena	Location
9	Shooto: Shooto (November)	November 28, 1990	Korakuen Hall	Tokyo, Japan
8	Shooto: Shooto (September)	September 8, 1990	Korakuen Hall	Tokyo, Japan
7	Shooto: Shooto (July)	July 7, 1990	Korakuen Hall	Tokyo, Japan
6	Shooto: Shooto (May)	May 12, 1990	Korakuen Hall	Tokyo, Japan
5	Shooto: Shooto (March)	March 17, 1990	Korakuen Hall	Tokyo, Japan
4	Shooto: Shooto (January)	January 13, 1990	Korakuen Hall	Tokyo, Japan

== Shooto: Shooto (January) ==
Shooto: Shooto was an event held on January 13, 1990, at Korakuen Hall in Tokyo, Japan.

=== Results ===
Main Card
Weight class				Method	Round	Time	Notes
	Yuichi Watanabe	def.	Kazuhiro Sakamoto	Submission (Armbar)	2	2:54
	Yasuto Sekishima	def.	Yoshimasa Ishikawa	Submission (Kimura)	1	2:18
	Kenji Kawaguchi	def.	Naoki Sakurada	TKO (Punches)	4	1:29
	Junichi Kubota	vs.	Suguru Shigeno	Draw	3	3:00
	Tomoyuki Saito	def.	Toshio Ando	Submission (Armbar)	1	2:48
	Tomonori Ohara	def.	Kengo Tsuchida	TKO (Punches)	3	0:16

== Shooto: Shooto (March) ==
Shooto: Shooto was an event held on March 17, 1990, at Korakuen Hall in Tokyo, Japan.

=== Results ===
Main Card
Weight class				Method	Round	Time	Notes
	Kenji Kawaguchi	vs.	Yasuto Sekishima	Draw	5	3:00
	Kazuhiro Kusayanagi	def.	Kaoru Todori	Submission (Armbar)	1	1:16
	Kenichi Tanaka	def.	Tetsuo Yokoyama	Submission (Achilles Lock)	1	0:21
	Noboru Asahi	def.	Tomoyuki Saito	Submission (Armbar)	1	2:54
	Manabu Yamada	vs.	Takashi Tojo	Draw	3	3:00

== Shooto: Shooto (May) ==
Shooto: Shooto was an event held on May 12, 1990, at Korakuen Hall in Tokyo, Japan.

=== Results ===
Main Card
Weight class				Method	Round	Time	Notes
Welterweight	Yasuto Sekishima	def.	Yoshimasa Ishikawa	Submission (Rear-Naked Choke)	1	1:49	(Note: Sekishima defeated Ishikawa to become the inaugural Shooto Welterweight Champion.)
	Yuji Ito	def.	Yuichi Watanabe	TKO (Punches)	3	1:49
	Manabu Yamada	vs.	Takashi Ishizaki	Draw	3	3:00
	Tomonori Ohara	def.	Suguru Shigeno	Decision (Unanimous)	3	3:00
	Tetsuo Yokoyama	def.	Kengo Tsuchida	Submission (Kimura)	3	2:42
	Hiroyuki Kanno	def.	Tomoyuki Saito	Decision (Unanimous)	3	3:00
	Satoshi Honma	def.	Yutaka Fuji	Submission (Armbar)	2	2:36

== Shooto: Shooto (July) ==
Shooto: Shooto was an event held on July 7, 1990, at Korakuen Hall in Tokyo, Japan.

=== Results ===
Main Card
Weight class				Method	Round	Time	Notes
	Kenichi Tanaka	def.	Kazuhiro Sakamoto	Submission (Armbar)	1	0:00
	Yasuto Sekishima	def.	Naoki Sakurada	Decision	5	3:00
	Yuji Ito	def.	Takashi Tojo	Submission (Kimura)	3	0:00
	Manabu Yamada	def.	Tomonori Ohara	KO (Punch)	1	0:00
	Tomoyuki Saito	vs.	Suguru Shigeno	Draw	3	3:00
	Noboru Asahi	def.	Kazumi Chikiyoshi	Decision (Unanimous)	3	3:00

== Shooto: Shooto (September) ==
Shooto: Shooto was an event held on September 8, 1990, at Korakuen Hall in Tokyo, Japan.

=== Results ===
Main Card
Weight class				Method	Round	Time	Notes
Featherweight	Kenichi Tanaka	def.	Kazuhiro Sakamoto	Submission (Kimura)	2	2:37	(Note: Tanaka defeated Sakamoto to become the inaugural Shooto Featherweight Champion.)
	Naoki Sakurada	vs.	Yuji Ito	Draw	5	3:00
	Manabu Yamada	def.	Yoshimasa Ishikawa	TKO (Punches)	1	2:07
	Kazuhiro Kusayanagi	def.	Satoshi Honma	Submission (Triangle Choke)	1	1:17
	Noboru Asahi	def.	Hiroyuki Kanno	Submission (Armbar)	1	0:38
	Suguru Shigeno	vs.	Hiroaki Matsutani	Draw	3	3:00

== Shooto: Shooto (November) ==
Shooto: Shooto was an event held on November 28, 1990, at Korakuen Hall in Tokyo, Japan.

=== Results ===
Main Card
Weight class				Method	Round	Time	Notes
Welterweight	Yasuto Sekishima (c)	vs.	Naoki Sakurada	Draw	5	3:00	(Note: Sekishima fought Sakurada to a draw to remain the Shooto Welterweight Champion.)
	Tomonori Ohara	def.	Kazuhiro Kusayanagi	KO (Punch)	4	0:58
	Kenji Kawaguchi	def.	Yuji Ito	KO (Punches)	3	0:37
	Noboru Asahi	def.	Takashi Ishizaki	Decision (Unanimous)	4	3:00
	Takashi Tojo	def.	Satoshi Honma	Submission (Armbar)	1	0:00
	Hiroyuki Kanno	def.	Masaru Yano	Submission (Kimura)	1	0:00
	Tomoyuki Saito	vs.	Hiroaki Matsutani	Draw	3	3:00

== See also ==
- Shooto
- List of Shooto champions
- List of Shooto Events
