= MMA Grand Prix =

- Sport: Mixed martial arts
- Founded: 2020; 6 years ago
- Founder: Abdel Khaznadji; Éric Konako Faubert
- Owner: Fight Sport Management
- Headquarters: Vitry-sur-Seine, Val-de-Marne, France
- Broadcasters: Sport en France; RMC Sport
- Website: mmagrandprix.com

MMA Grand Prix, often abbreviated MMA GP, is a professional mixed martial arts promotion based in Vitry-sur-Seine, Val-de-Marne, France.

== History ==
MMA Grand Prix was created in 2020, upon the legalization of MMA's internationally accepted rules (which include ground strikes) by the French government. Their first card was held on 8 October of that year, in presence of French Minister of Sports Roxana Maracineanu. It was the first organization to present MMA in France under its complete ruleset. It is sanctioned by the French Mixed Martial Arts Federation, a subsidiary of the French Boxing Federation, which has been accredited by the Ministry of Sports to regulate the activity.

Co-founder Éric Konako Faubert is a London-based promoter for Muay Thai Grand Prix, an international thai boxing promotion, with whom MMA Grand Prix shares common branding.

The promotion's first card held outside of the Paris region, The Last of the Kings in Le Havre, featured a comeback fight from veteran kickboxer turned mixed martial artist Jérome Le Banner. It served as a tribute to Le Banner's training partner and Le Havre mayor Édouard Philippe who, during his term as prime minister, was responsible for the legalization of French MMA. It was Le Banner's first MMA fight outside of Japan.

== Champions ==
=== Current MMA Grand Prix champions ===
Men's division	Upper weight limit	Champion	Since	Title Defenses
Light Heavyweight	205 lb (93.0 kg)	(Algeria) Mohamed Said Maalem	Sep 16, 2023	0
Lightweight	154 lb (69.9 kg)	(Brazil) Keweney Lopes	Jan 27, 2024	0
Featherweight	145 lb (65.8 kg)	Vacant	N/A	N/A
Bantamweight	135 lb (61.2 kg)	(France) Alfan Rocher-Labes	Sep 16, 2023	0
Flyweight	125 lb (56.7 kg)	(France) Michael Aljarouj	Mar 4, 2023	1

=== Light Heavyweight Championship ===
Weight limit: 205 lb (93.0 kg)

No.	Name	Event	Date	Defenses
1	(Algeria) Mohamed Said Maalem def. Yann Kouadja	MMA GP: Kouadja vs Maalem; Le Grand-Saconnex, France	Sep 16, 2023	

=== Lightweight Championship ===
Weight limit: 154 lb (69.9 kg)

No.	Name	Event	Date	Defenses
1	(Brazil) Keweney Lopes def. Mathias Poiron	JSC 1 Nimas, France	Jan 27, 2024	

=== Featherweight Championship ===
Weight limit: 145 lb (65.8 kg)

No.	Name	Event	Date	Defenses
1	(France) Alioune Nahaye def. Ariston França	MMA Grand Prix 4 Paris, France	Oct 14, 2021	
Nahaye vacated.

=== Bantamweight Championship ===
Weight limit: 135 lb (61.2 kg)

No.	Name	Event	Date	Defenses
1	(France) Alfan Rocher-Labes def. Deiby Tachon	MMA GP: Kouadja vs Maalem; Le Grand-Saconnex, France	Sep 16, 2023	

=== Flyweight Championship ===
Weight limit: 125 lb (56.7 kg)

No.	Name	Event	Date	Defenses
1	(France) Michael Aljarouj def. Ezzoubair Bouarsa	MMA GP: Doumbe vs Klimas; Paris, France	Mar 4, 2023	1. def. Liridon Ramani at JSC 1 on Jan 27, 2024

== Notable fighters ==
- Cédric Doumbé
- Karim Ghajji
- Jérome Le Banner
- Mickaël Lebout
- fr:Laetitia Blot

== Media ==
Select MMA GP shows, including the company's inaugural card, have aired on the UFC Fight Pass. In May 2022, the promotion inked its first television deal with Sport en France. However, French media authority CSA still bans MMA broadcasts before 10:30 pm, forcing some fights to be shown on tape delay. MMA GP made its premium TV debut with a 17 December 2022 card from Bordeaux, which was broadcast on RMC Sport 2.
