= Centurion FC =

MMA promoter based in Malta

- Sport: Mixed martial arts
- Founded: 2017; 9 years ago
- President: Roberto Gallo
- Country: Malta
- Headquarters: Malta
- Official website: centurionfc.tv

Centurion FC is a mixed martial arts league and martial arts promotion in Southern Europe, based in Malta. Established in 2017, Centurion FC has to date held 20 events across six nations.

== Current champions ==
Division	Champion	Since	Defenses
Heavyweight	(Brazil) Eduardo Neves	May 18, 2024	0
Light Heavyweight	(Brazil) Rafael Carvalho	Nov 15, 2023	0
Welterweight	(Brazil) Rodrigo Lídio	August 24, 2024	0
Lightweight	(Brazil) João Oliveira	March 8, 2024	0
Featherweight	Vacant	—	—

== Championship history ==
=== Heavyweight Championship ===
Weight limit: 120 kg (264.6 lb)

No.	Name	Event	Date	Defenses
1	(Brazil) Roggers Souza def. Genadi Zhorzholiani	Centurion FC: Rex Redemptor; Malta	May 26, 2023	
2	(Brazil) Eduardo Neves	CFC 20: Venus Victrix; São Paulo, Brazil	May 18, 2024	

=== Light Heavyweight Championship ===
Weight limit: 93 kg (205.0 lb)

No.	Name	Event	Date	Defenses
1	(Brazil) Rafael Carvalho def. Marcelo Alfaya	CFC 16: Mursa; Malta	Nov 15, 2023	

=== Welterweight Championship ===
Weight limit: 77 kg (169.8 lb)

No.	Name	Event	Date	Defenses
1	(France) Alexandre Bordin def. Brian Lo-A-Njoe	Centurion Fight Championship 2 Malta	Nov 4, 2017	
Bordin vacated.
2	(Brazil) Rodrigo Lídio def. Eduardo Souza	CFC 22: Obsidio; São Paulo	Aug 24, 2024	
3	(Brazil) André Borges	CFC 23: Copacabana; Rio	Oct 12, 2024	

=== Lightweight Championship ===
Weight limit: 70 kg (154.3 lb)

No.	Name	Event	Date	Defenses
1	(Brazil) João Oliveira def. Bruno Roverso	CFC 18; Rio de Janeiro, Brazil	Mar 8, 2024	
—	(Brazil) Inglesson de Lara def. Marlon Brito for the interim championship	CFC 23: Copacabana; Rio de Janeiro, Brazil	Oct 12, 2024	

=== Featherweight Championship ===
Weight limit: 66 kg (145.5 lb)

No.	Name	Event	Date	Defenses
1	(France) Daguir Imavov def. Rafael Macedo	Centurion Fight Championship 2 Malta	Nov 4, 2017	
Imavov vacated.

== Tournament Champions ==
Event	Date	Division	Winner	Runner-up
Centurion Fight Championship 5: The Last Emperor	Apr 6, 2019	Featherweight	(Malta) Enrico Manicaro	(Italy) Alessio Scalavino
Centurion FC: Rex Deserti	Mar 15, 2023	Super Lightweight	(Uzbekistan) Jakhongir Jumaev	(Republic of Ireland) Nikolay Grozdev
Centurion FC: Rex Redemptor	May 26, 2023	Welterweight	(Brazil) Mauricio Ruffy	(Brazil) Ronys Torres
Centurion FC: Non Ducor, Duco	Jun 16, 2023	Welterweight	(Brazil) Antônio Monteiro	(Brazil) Fabricio Martins
CFC 14: Rex Orientem	Jul 21, 2023	Welterweight	(Brazil) Eduardo Souza	(Japan) Keishi Yagi
CFC 15: Activm	Sep 6, 2023	Welterweight	(Brazil) Mauricio Otalora	(Latvia) Artūrs Leisāns
CFC 16: Mursa	Nov 15, 2023	Welterweight	(Brazil) Felipe Douglas	(Brazil) Jonathan Carlos
CFC 17: Rex Mundi	Jan 20, 2024	Welterweight	(Brazil) Eduardo Souza (2)	(Brazil) Ronys Torres
CFC 19: Impetum	Apr 25, 2024	Super Welterweight	(Brazil) Milson Castro	(Brazil) Walber dos Anjos
CFC 20: Venus Victrix	Apr 25, 2024	Super Welterweight	(Brazil) Lucas Marques	(Brazil) Itamar Junior
CFC 21: Invulnerabilis	Jul 20, 2024	Super Welterweight	(Brazil) Jairo Pacheco	(Brazil) Taffarel Brasil
CFC 22: Obsidio	Aug 24, 2024	Super Welterweight	(Brazil) Anderson Ferreira	(Brazil) Rogério Matias
CFC 23: Copacabana	Oct 12, 2024	Super Welterweight	(Brazil) Paulo Henrique	(Brazil) Anderson Ferreira
CFC 24: ARCEM	Nov 13, 2024	Welterweight	(Brazil) Thiago Lima	(Brazil) Rangel de Sá

== Past events ==
#	Event title	Date	Arena	Location
23	CFC 22 - Obsidio	August 24, 2024	VIP Station	São Paulo, Brazil
22	CFC 21 - Invulnerabilis	July 20, 2024	Club Municipal Tijuca	Rio de Janeiro, Brazil
21	CFC 20 - Venus Victrix	May 18, 2024	Ibirapuera Arena	São Paulo, Brazil
20	CFC 19 - Impetum	April 25, 2024	VIP Station	São Paulo, Brazil
19	CFC 18 - Rio de Janeiro	March 8, 2024	Ilha do Governador	Rio de Janeiro, Brazil
18	CFC 17 - Rex Mundi	January 20, 2024	Upper Arena	Rio de Janeiro, Brazil
17	Centurion FC 16 - Mursa	November 15, 2023	Basket Pavilion, Valletta, Malta	Valletta, Malta
16	CFC 15 - Activm	September 6, 2023	City of Dream	Limassol, Cyprus
15	CFC 14 - Rex Orientem	July 21, 2023	Casa Ibarra	Manila, Philippines
14	Centurion FC - Non ducor, duco	June 16, 2023	Morumbi	São Paulo, Brazil
13	Centurion FC - Rex Redemptor	May 26, 2023	Upper Arena	Rio de Janeiro, Brazil
12	Centurion FC - Rex Deserti	March 15, 2023	Intercontinental Hotel, Festival City, Dubai, United Arab Emirates	Dubai, United Arab Emirates
11	Centurion FC - Gloria	January 20, 2023	KSC Pinki Zemun	Belgrade, Serbia
10	Centurion FC - Ad Maiora	November 17, 2022	Malta Basketball Pavilion	Valletta, Malta
9	CFC Malta 9 - Centurion Fight Championship: Rudit Leo	August 24, 2022	KSC Pinki Zemun	Belgrade, Serbia
8	CFC Malta 8 - Centurion Fight Championship: New Era	July 2, 2022	Fort Saint Elmo	Valletta, Malta
7	CFC Malta 7 - Centurion Fight Championship: Underog	November 6, 2021	Malta	Malta
6	CFC Malta 6 - Centurion Fight Championship: Resilience	October 26, 2019	Hilton Hotel	St. Julian's, Malta
5	CFC Malta 5 - Centurion Fight Championship: The Last Emperor	April 6, 2019	De La Salle College	Birgu, Malta
4	CFC Malta 4 - Centurion Fight Championship	September 7, 2018	Greek Theatre at Ta' Qali National Park	Attard, Malta
3	CFC Malta 3 - Centurion Fight Championship: Road to Centurion	June 9, 2018	Villa Rosa Beach Garden	St. Julian's, Malta
2	CFC Malta 2 - Centurion Fight Championship	November 4, 2017	Corradino Sports Pavilion	Paola, Malta
1	CFC Malta 1 - Centurion Fight Championship: The Time Has Come	May 13, 2017	Corradino Sports Pavilion	Paola, Malta

== Notable fighters ==
- (Brazil) Anderson dos Santos
- (Brazil) Kalindra Faria
- (Tunisia) Hamza Hamry
- (Brazil) Rafael Carvalho
- (Netherlands) Brian Lo-A-Njoe
- (France) Nassourdine Imavov

== See also ==
- Ultimate Fighting Championship
- Bellator MMA
