= Yasuto Sekishima =

Japanese mixed martial artist

- Born: Iida, Nagano, Japan
- Weight: 167 lb (76 kg; 11.9 st)
- Division: Welterweight
- Style: Shoot wrestling, Shoot Boxing, Catch Wrestling, Shooto, Combat Wrestling,
- Team: Shooting Gym Narita
- Years active: 1989–1993

Mixed martial arts record
- Total: 13
- Wins: 7
- By knockout: 1
- By submission: 4
- By decision: 2
- Losses: 2
- By decision: 2
- Draws: 4

Other information
- Mixed martial arts record from Sherdog

Yasuto Sekishima is a Japanese mixed martial artist. He competed in the Welterweight division. He was the inaugural Shooto Middleweight Champion.

Sekishima trained under Satoru Sayama at the Super Tiger Gym. He was originally a judoka and also trained in shootboxing under Caesar Takeshi and combat wrestling under Noriaki Kiguchi and debuted as an amateur before Shooto's professional years. He would debut as a professional in 1989 to a draw to Mitsuo Fujikura.

== Championships and Accomplishments ==
- Shooto
  - Shooto Middleweight Championship (One time)
    - One successful title defense

== Mixed martial arts record ==
Professional record breakdown
| 13 matches | 7 wins | 2 losses |
| By knockout | 1 | 0 |
| By submission | 4 | 0 |
| By decision | 2 | 2 |
| Draws | 4 | |

| Res. | Record | Opponent | Method | Event | Date | Round | Time | Location | Notes |
|---|---|---|---|---|---|---|---|---|---|
| Draw | 7–2–4 | Yuji Ito | Draw | Shooto - Shooto | April 26, 1993 | 5 | 3:00 | Tokyo, Japan | |
| Win | 7–2–3 | Kazuhiro Kusayanagi | Decision (unanimous) | Shooto - Shooto | February 26, 1993 | 5 | 3:00 | Tokyo, Japan | |
| Loss | 6–2–3 | Naoki Sakurada | Decision (majority) | Shooto - Shooto | October 17, 1991 | 5 | 3:00 | Osaka, Japan | |
| Loss | 6–1–3 | Yoshimasa Ishikawa | Decision (unanimous) | Shooto - Shooto | August 3, 1991 | 5 | 3:00 | Tokyo, Japan | |
| Win | 6–0–3 | Takashi Tojo | Submission (armbar) | Shooto - Shooto | March 29, 1991 | 2 | 0:00 | Tokyo, Japan | |
| Win | 5–0–3 | Manabu Yamada | KO (punch) | Shooto - Shooto | January 13, 1991 | 2 | 0:00 | Tokyo, Japan | |
| Draw | 4–0–3 | Naoki Sakurada | Draw | Shooto - Shooto | November 28, 1990 | 5 | 3:00 | Tokyo, Japan | |
| Win | 4–0–2 | Naoki Sakurada | Decision | Shooto - Shooto | July 7, 1990 | 5 | 3:00 | Tokyo, Japan | |
| Win | 3–0–2 | Yoshimasa Ishikawa | Submission (rear-naked choke) | Shooto - Shooto | May 12, 1990 | 1 | 1:49 | Tokyo, Japan | |
| Draw | 2–0–2 | Kenji Kawaguchi | Draw | Shooto - Shooto | March 17, 1990 | 5 | 3:00 | Tokyo, Japan | |
| Win | 2–0–1 | Yoshimasa Ishikawa | Submission (kimura) | Shooto - Shooto | January 13, 1990 | 1 | 2:18 | Tokyo, Japan | |
| Win | 1–0–1 | Yuji Ito | Submission (armbar) | Shooto - Shooto | October 19, 1989 | 4 | 2:01 | Tokyo, Japan | |
| Draw | 0–0–1 | Mitsuo Fujikura | Draw | Shooto - Shooto | July 29, 1989 | 5 | 3:00 | Tokyo, Japan | |

== Kickboxing record ==
Professional Kickboxing and Muay Thai record
0 Wins (0 (T)KO's), 3 losses
| Date | Result | Opponent | Event | Location | Method | Round | Time |
| 2001-6-3 | Loss | (Japan) Kunihide Onose | NKB | Tokyo, Japan | TKO (3 knockdown rule) | 3 | 1:52 |
| 2001-3-25 | Loss | (Japan) Takahiro Seo | APKF | Yokohama, Japan | TKO (Low kick) | 4 | 0:36 |
| 1994-5-17 | - | (Japan) Yudai Watanabe | MAJKF | Tokyo, Japan | - | - | - |
| 1994-1-22 | Loss | (Japan) Adam Watt | MAJKF | Tokyo, Japan | KO | - | - |
Legend: Win Loss Draw/No contest Notes

== See also ==
- List of male mixed martial artists
