= Mitsuhisa Sunabe =

Japanese martial artist

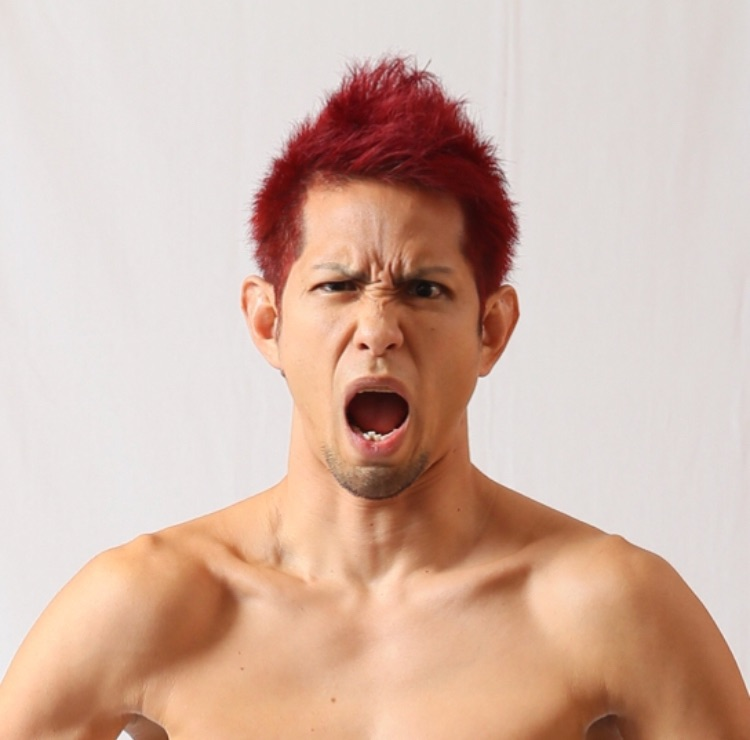
- Born: August 4, 1979 (age 47); Naha, Okinawa, Japan
- Native name: 砂辺 光久
- Other names: Speed Star
- Nationality: Japanese
- Height: 5 ft 8 in (1.73 m)
- Weight: 115 lb (52 kg; 8.2 st)
- Division: Strawweight; Flyweight; Bantamweight; Featherweight
- Style: Wrestling, Kickboxing
- Stance: Orthodox
- Fighting out of: Okinawa, Japan
- Team: REAL (2000-2007); P'S REAL (2007-2008); Unaffiliated (2009); TEAM Reversal (2010-2015) reversaL Gym OKINAWA CROSS×LINE (2016-present)
- Years active: 2001-present

Mixed martial arts record
- Total: 46
- Wins: 29
- By knockout: 9
- By submission: 6
- By decision: 14
- Losses: 13
- By knockout: 5
- By submission: 0
- By decision: 7
- By disqualification: 1
- Draws: 4

Other information
- Mixed martial arts record from Sherdog

Mitsuhisa Sunabe (砂辺 光久, Sunabe Mitsuhisa; born August 4, 1979) is a Japanese mixed martial artist. He is the former and inaugural Pancrase Strawweight champion, Pancrase Light Flyweight champion and Pancrase Flyweight champion. He is regarded by Fight Matrix as the third-best men's strawweight mixed martial artist of all time.

== Mixed martial arts career ==
=== Pancrase flyweight champion ===
==== Title reign ====
Pancrase announced on April 27, 2009, that an inaugural Pancrase Flyweight Championship bout would be held at the Differ Ariake in Tokyo, Japan at Pancrase: Changing Tour 3 on June 7 of the same year. The contest saw Sunabe, at the time the #1 ranked flyweight within the promotion, face the second-ranked Takuya Eizumi. In front of a sellout crowd of 1,880, Sunabe won the fight by a first-round knockout. According to the Pancrase Front Office head Yasushi Sakamoto it was the highest attendance record for the Differ Ariake.

Sunabe made his maiden championship defense against Isao Hirose, who was at the time riding a six-fight win streak, at Pancrase: Changing Tour 6 on October 25, 2009. He retained the title by unanimous decision.

==== Title loss ====
Sunabe made his second championship defense against the first-ranked Kiyotaka Shimizu in the co-main event of Pancrase: Passion Tour 1 on February 7, 2010. It was Sunabe's first fight since he had begun training at Team Reversal. He lost the fight by majority decision.

Sunabe faced Hayato Sato at Pancrase: Passion Tour 4 on April 29, 2010. He won the fight by a first-round technical knockout. Sunabe next faced Shinpei Tahara at Pancrase: Passion Tour 8 on September 5, 2010. He won the fight by a third-round knockout. These two victories re-affirmed Sunabe's place at the top of the flyweight rankings.

Sunabe faced Kiyotaka Shimizu in a trilogy bout, with the Pancrase Flyweight championship on the line, at Pancrase: Passion Tour 11 on December 5, 2010. The pair faced each other on two previous occasions, with each earning a single victory against the other. The fight was ruled a draw by majority decision. Accordingly, a fourth fight between the pair was scheduled for Pancrase: Impressive Tour 5 on June 5, 2011. Sunabe lost the fight by a narrow majority decision, with scores of 30—29, 30—29 and 30—30 in favor of his opponent.

=== Pancrase light-flyweight champion ===
==== Title reign ====
Pancrase announced on June 11, 2011, that Sunabe would be one of four participants of the 2011 Pancrase Light Flyweight Tournament, held to crown the inaugural Pancrase Light Flyweight champion. Sunabe faced the third-ranked Pancrase super-flyweight Yoshihiro Matsunaga in the tournament semifinals at Pancrase: Impressive Tour 8 on August 7, 2011. In front of an audience of 1,999, Sunabe won the fight by unanimous decision, with scores of 20—19, 20—19 and 20—19. Sunabe advanced to the finals, held at Pancrase: Impressive Tour 13 on December 3, 2011, where he faced Hiroyuki Abe. He captured the inaugural title by a third-round technical knockout.

Sunabe faced Toshio Mitani in a non-title bout at Pancrase: Progress Tour 6 on May 20, 2012. He won the fight by a first-round armbar submission.

Sunabe made his first light-flyweight championship defense against mandatory challenger Masakazu Utsugi in the main event of Pancrase: Progress Tour 12, which took place at the Differ Ariake in Tokyo, Japan on November 10, 2012. He won the fight by a dominant unanimous decision.

Sunabe faced Shingo Yakul in a super flyweight bout in a Sakaguchi Dojo x Pancrase Joint Event on April 21, 2013. He won the fight by a first-round flying knee knockout.

Sunabe faced Chikara Shimabukuro in a non-title bout at Pancrase 250: 2013 Neo-Blood Tournament Finals on July 28, 2013. He won the fight by unanimous decision, with scores of 20—19, 20—18 and 20—18.

Sunabe made his second Pancrase Light Flyweight Championship defense against the first-ranked contender Noboru Tahara at Pancrase 252: 30th Anniversary on September 29, 2013. It was a rematch of their September 5, 2010 bout, which Sunabe won by stoppage. Sunabe once again proved to be the better fighter, as he won the fight by unanimous decision, with two scorecards of 30—29 and one scorecard of 30—28 in his favor.

==== Move up in weight ====
Sunabe faced Ho Yong Jang in a -58 catchweight super fight at Tenkaichi Fight: Tenkaichi 70 on March 2, 2014. He won the bout by a first-round armbar submission.

Sunabe faced promotional newcomer Hiroaki Ijima in a super flyweight bout at Pancrase: 259 on June 29, 2014. He won the fight by unanimous decision, with scores of 29—28, 29—28 and 30—27.

Sunabe faced the eighth-ranked Pancrase super flyweight contender Tatsuya So in a super flyweight bout at Tenkaichi Fight: Tenkaichi 74 on December 14, 2014. He won the fight by split decision, with scores of 29—28, 29—28 and 28—29.

Sunabe returned to light flyweight to face the six-ranked light flyweight contender Seiji Ozuka in a non-title bout at Pancrase: 265 on March 15, 2015. He won the fight by a second-ranked head kick knockout.

In his final fight as a light flyweight champion, Sunabe faced the lightweight Takafumi Ito in an openweight bout at Pancrase: 268 on July 5, 2015. He won the fight by a third-round submission.

Sunabe vacated the Pancrase Light Flyweight championship on September 9, 2015, in order to compete in a lower weight class.

=== Pancrase strawweight champion ===
Sunabe faced Hiroyuki Abe for the inaugural Pancrase Strawweight Championship at Pancrase: 271 on November 1, 2015. The pair previously faced each other in the finals of the 2011 Pancrase Light Flyweight Tournament, when Sunabe was able to win by stoppage. Sunabe was once again victorious, as he won the fight by split decision, with scores of 48—47, 48—47 and 47—48.

Sunabe faced the former ZST flyweight champion Ryo Hatta in a non-title bout at Pancrase: Progress Tour 6 on May 20, 2012. He won the fight by a first-round armbar submission.

Sunabe made his first Pancrase Strawweight Championship defense against the #1 ranked strawweight contender Daichi Kitakata at Pancrase: 283 on December 18, 2016. He won the fight by a second-round submission.

Sunabe made his second Pancrase strawweight title defense against the former Shooto World Flyweight (114 lb) champion Shinya Murofushi at Pancrase: 295 on April 15, 2018. He won the fight by a second-round knockout.

Sunabe made his Rizin FF debut against the DEEP Strawweight World champion Haruo Ochi at Rizin 13 on September 30, 2018. He lost the fight by a third-round knockout.

After suffering his first loss in over seven years, Sunabe was booked to make his third Pancrase strawweight title defense against Daichi Kitakata at Pancrase 307 on July 21, 2019. He lost the fight by a fifth-round technical knockout.

=== Return to flyweight ===
Sunabe returned to professional competition following a 28-month hiatus, at the age of 41, to face fellow veteran Yoshiro Maeda in a flyweight bout at Rizin 32 on November 20, 2021. He lost the fight by unanimous decision.

Sunabe faced Nobuyoshi Nakatsuka in a catchweight bout at Rizin 36 on July 2, 2022. He lost the fight by a first-round technical knockout.

Sunabe returned to Pancrase to face Kohei Maeda at Pancrase 342 on April 29, 2024. He lost the fight by unanimous decision, with all three ringside officials awarding every round of the bout to his opponent.

Sunabe faced Ryusei Tokida at Pancrase 350 on December 15, 2024. He lost the fight by a second-round technical knockout.

== Professional wrestling career ==
Sunabe is also an occasional professional wrestler, often appearing for joshi promotion Oz Academy in intergender and tag matches. He debuted in professional wrestling in 2007 to a losing effort to Daisuke Sekimoto. He has also appeared for promotions such as Hard Hit, Ganbare Pro, DDT Pro Wrestling and Ryukyu Dragon Pro Wrestling.

Sunabe has been working to promote MMA in Okinawa, his hometown, and is going to host the grappling event series "OKINAWA WWF" there.

== Championships and accomplishments ==
=== Amateur ===
- Pancrase
  - 1st Amateur Pancrase Open Tournament (1999), Under 60 kg Class, Winner
  - 2nd Amateur Pancrase Open Tournament (2000), Under 60 kg Class, Winner

=== Professional ===
- Pancrase
  - Pancrase Flyweight Championship (Inaugural; Former)
    - One successful title defense
  - 2011 Pancrase Light Flyweight Championship Tournament Winner
  - Pancrase Light Flyweight Championship (Inaugural; Former)
    - Two successful title defenses
  - Pancrase Strawweight Championship (Inaugural; Former)
    - Two successful title defenses

== Mixed martial arts record ==
Professional record breakdown
46 matches	29 wins	13 losses
By knockout	9	5
By submission	6	0
By decision	14	7
By disqualification	0	1
Draws	4	

Res.	Record	Opponent	Method	Event	Date	Round	Time	Location	Notes
Loss	29–13–4	Ryusei Tokida	TKO (punches)	Pancrase 350	December 15, 2024	2	4:46	Minato, Japan	
Loss	29–12–4	Kohei Maeda	Decision (unanimous)	Pancrase 342	April 29, 2024	3	5:00	Tachikawa, Japan	Return to Flyweight.
Loss	29–11–4	Nobuyoshi Nakatsuka	TKO (knee and punches)	Rizin 36	July 2, 2022	1	1:40	Okinawa, Japan	Catchweight (119 lb) bout.
Loss	29–10–4	Yoshiro Maeda	Decision (unanimous)	Rizin 32	November 20, 2021	3	5:00	Okinawa, Japan	Catchweight (129 lb) bout.
Loss	29–9–4	Daichi Kitakata	TKO (punches)	Pancrase 307	July 21, 2019	5	0:38	Tokyo, Japan	Lost the Pancrase Strawweight Championship.
Loss	29–8–4	Haruo Ochi	KO (soccer kicks)	Rizin 13	September 30, 2018	3	2:53	Saitama, Japan	
Win	29–7–4	Shinya Murofushi	KO (slam)	Pancrase: 295	April 15, 2018	2	4:11	Tokyo, Japan	Defended the Pancrase Strawweight Championship.
Win	28–7–4	Daichi Kitakata	Submission (rear naked choke)	Pancrase: 283	December 18, 2016	2	0:48	Tokyo, Japan	Defended the Pancrase Strawweight Championship.
Win	27–7–4	Ryo Hatta	TKO (elbows)	Pancrase: 278	June 12, 2016	3	3:47	Tokyo, Japan	
Win	26–7–4	Hiroyuki Abe	Decision (split)	Pancrase: 271	November 1, 2015	5	5:00	Tokyo, Japan	Strawweight debut. Won the inaugural Pancrase Strawweight Championship.
Win	25–7–4	Takafumi Ito	Submission (rear naked choke)	Pancrase: 268	July 5, 2015	3	0:27	Tokyo, Japan	
Win	24–7–4	Seiji Ozuka	KO (head kick)	Pancrase: 265	March 15, 2015	2	1:39	Tokyo, Japan	
Win	23–7–4	Tatsuya So	Decision (split)	Tenkaichi Fight: Tenkaichi 74	December 14, 2014	3	5:00	Koza, Japan	
Win	22–7–4	Hiroaki Ijima	Decision (unanimous)	Pancrase: 259	June 29, 2014	3	5:00	Tokyo, Japan	
Win	21–7–4	Ho Yong Jang	Submission (armbar)	Tenkaichi Fight: Tenkaichi 70	March 2, 2014	1	4:33	Koza, Japan	
Win	20–7–4	Noboru Tahara	Decision (unanimous)	Pancrase 252: 30th Anniversary	September 29, 2013	3	5:00	Yokohama, Japan	Defended the Pancrase Light Flyweight Championship.
Win	19–7–4	Chikara Shimabukuro	Decision (unanimous)	Pancrase 250: 2013 Neo-Blood Tournament Finals	July 28, 2013	2	5:00	Tokyo, Japan	
Win	18–7–4	Shingo Yakul	KO (flying knee)	Pancrase: Sakaguchi Dojo vs. Pancrase	April 21, 2013	1	4:23	Okinawa, Japan	
Win	17–7–4	Masakazu Utsugi	Decision (unanimous)	Pancrase: Progress Tour 12	November 10, 2012	3	5:00	Tokyo, Japan	Defended the Pancrase Light Flyweight Championship.
Win	16–7–4	Toshio Mitani	Submission (armbar)	Pancrase: Progress Tour 6	May 20, 2012	1	2:48	Okinawa, Japan	
Win	15–7–4	Hiroyuki Abe	TKO (punches)	Pancrase: Impressive Tour 13	December 3, 2011	3	4:10	Tokyo, Japan	Won the 2011 Pancrase Light Flyweight Tournament and the inaugural Pancrase Light Flyweight Championship.
Win	14–7–4	Yoshihiro Matsunaga	Decision (unanimous)	Pancrase: Impressive Tour 8	August 7, 2011	2	5:00	Tokyo, Japan	2011 Pancrase Light Flyweight Tournament Semifinal.
Loss	13–7–4	Kiyotaka Shimizu	Decision (majority)	Pancrase: Impressive Tour 5	June 5, 2011	3	5:00	Tokyo, Japan	For the Pancrase Flyweight Championship.
Draw	13–6–4	Kiyotaka Shimizu	Draw (Majority)	Pancrase: Passion Tour 11	December 5, 2010	3	5:00	Tokyo, Japan	For the Pancrase Flyweight Championship.
Win	13–6–3	Shinpei Tahara	KO (slam)	Pancrase: Passion Tour 8	September 5, 2010	3	2:32	Tokyo, Japan	
Win	12–6–3	Hayato Sato	TKO (punches)	Pancrase: Passion Tour 4	April 29, 2010	1	2:31	Tokyo, Japan	
Loss	11–6–3	Kiyotaka Shimizu	Decision (majority)	Pancrase: Passion Tour 1	February 7, 2010	3	5:00	Tokyo, Japan	Lost the Pancrase Flyweight Championship.
Win	11–5–3	Isao Hirose	Decision (unanimous)	Pancrase: Changing Tour 6	October 25, 2009	3	5:00	Tokyo, Japan	Defended the Pancrase Flyweight Championship.
Win	10–5–3	Takuya Eizumi	KO (punch)	Pancrase: Changing Tour 3	June 7, 2009	1	4:35	Tokyo, Japan	Won the inaugural Pancrase Flyweight Championship.
Win	9–5–3	Kiyotaka Shimizu	Decision (unanimous)	Pancrase: Real 2008	June 29, 2008	2	5:00	Okinawa, Japan	Flyweight debut.
Loss	8–5–3	Daichi Fujiwara	KO (head kick)	Pancrase: Rising 7	September 30, 2007	2	0:09	Osaka, Japan	
Draw	8–4–3	Koji Yoshimoto	Draw (majority)	Pancrase: Rising 6	September 5, 2007	3	5:00	Tokyo, Japan	
Win	8–4–2	Takumi Murata	Decision (majority)	Pancrase: Real 2007	April 8, 2007	2	5:00	Okinawa, Japan	
Draw	7–4–2	Naoji Fujimoto	Draw	Pancrase: Rising 1	February 4, 2007	2	5:00	Osaka, Japan	
Win	7–4–1	Roberto Matsumoto	TKO (knee injury)	Cage Force 1	November 25, 2006	1	5:00	Tokyo, Japan	Bantamweight bout.
Loss	6–4–1	Manabu Inoue	Decision (unanimous)	Pancrase: Blow 7	September 16, 2006	2	5:00	Tokyo, Japan	
Win	6–3–1	Russ Miura	Decision (unanimous)	Pancrase: Blow 1	January 26, 2006	3	5:00	Tokyo, Japan	
Win	5–3–1	Minoru Tsuiki	Submission (triangle choke)	Pancrase: Z	September 3, 2005	1	4:21	Kumamoto, Japan	
Draw	4–3–1	Masashi Kameda	Draw	Pancrase: Brave 7	August 22, 2004	2	5:00	Osaka, Japan	
Loss	4–3	Masashi Kameda	DQ (accidental headbutt)	Pancrase: Brave 6	June 22, 2004	1	3:52	Tokyo, Japan	
Loss	4–2	Miki Shida	Decision (unanimous)	Pancrase: Brave 1	February 6, 2004	2	5:00	Tokyo, Japan	
Loss	4–1	Yoshiro Maeda	Decision (unanimous)	Pancrase: Hybrid 5	May 18, 2003	2	5:00	Kanagawa, Japan	
Win	4–0	Kunihiro Watanabe	Technical Submission (guillotine choke)	Pancrase: Spirit 8	November 30, 2002	2	1:17	Kanagawa, Japan	
Win	3–0	Masahito Wachi	Decision (split)	Pancrase: 2002 Neo-Blood Tournament Second Round	July 28, 2002	3	5:00	Tokyo, Japan	Featherweight debut.
Win	2–0	Rambaa Somdet	Decision (majority)	Deep: 4th Impact	March 30, 2002	3	5:00	Tokyo, Japan	
Win	1–0	Naoki Deguchi	Decision (split)	Pancrase: Proof 4	June 26, 2001	2	5:00	Tokyo, Japan	Bantamweight debut.

Amateur record breakdown		
6 matches	5 wins	1 loss
By submission	1	0
By decision	4	1

Res.	Record	Opponent	Method	Event	Date	Round	Time	Location	Notes
Win	5–1	Minoru Tsuiki	Decision (unanimous)	2nd Amateur Pancrase Open Tournament	November 19, 2000	2	5:00	Tokyo, Japan	Won the 2nd Amateur Pancrase Open Tournament
Win	4–1	Takumi Murata	Decision (unanimous)	2nd Amateur Pancrase Open Tournament	November 19, 2000	2	5:00	Tokyo, Japan	
Win	3–1	Shuichi Takahashi	Decision (unanimous)	2nd Amateur Pancrase Open Tournament	November 19, 2000	2	5:00	Tokyo, Japan	
Win	2–1	East Pacific Representative	Decision (unanimous)	2nd Amateur Pancrase Open Tournament	November 19, 2000	2	5:00	Tokyo, Japan	
Loss	1–1	Tomohiro Hata	Decision (unanimous)	7th All Japan Amateur Shooto Championships	September 10, 2000	1	4:00	Tokyo, Japan	
Win	1–0	Atsushi Takeuchi	Submission (choke)	7th All Japan Amateur Shooto Championships	September 10, 2000	1	1:14	Tokyo, Japan	

== See also ==
- List of current mixed martial arts champions
- List of male mixed martial artists
