= Kiyotaka Shimizu =

Japanese mixed martial artist

- Born: March 14, 1984 (age 42); Ishibashi, Tochigi, Japan
- Native name: 清水 清隆
- Nationality: Japanese
- Height: 5 ft 2 in (1.57 m)
- Weight: 125 lb (57 kg; 8.9 st)
- Division: Flyweight
- Stance: Orthodox
- Fighting out of: Tokyo, Japan
- Team: Tribe Tokyo MMA
- Years active: 2008–present

Mixed martial arts record
- Total: 46
- Wins: 25
- By knockout: 12
- By submission: 4
- By decision: 9
- Losses: 18
- By knockout: 2
- By submission: 1
- By decision: 15
- Draws: 3

Other information
- Mixed martial arts record from Sherdog

Kiyotaka Shimizu (清水清隆, Shimizu Kiyotaka; born March 14, 1984) is a Japanese mixed martial artist. Shimizu fought primarily in Pancrase, as well as Shooto and Sengoku.

He is a former Flyweight King Of Pancrase, where he holds the joint record for consecutive title defenses (6). He is currently the #2 ranked bantamweight (123 lbs) in Shooto.

== Early life ==
Kiyotaka Shimizu was born in Ishibashi and attended the Sakushin Gakuin High School. He initially belonged to the basketball club, and was expected to take over the family shop. He became interested in martial arts in the second year of high school. He would eventually move to Tokyo and joined the SK Absolute gym.

== Mixed martial arts career ==
=== Pancrase ===
He would begin his career as an amateur kickboxer, participating in the 2007 KAMINARIMON CLIMAX tournament, fighting in the 121 lbs weight class. He won all four fights, including the final against Yudai Sudo.

Shimizu won the Flyweight Neo Blood flyweight tournament 15th. In the first round he beat Toshihiro Shimizu with a rear naked choke. He won the same way against Takuma Ishii in the semifinals. In the finals he beat Yuichiro Yajima through a unanimous decision.

On February 7, 2010, Shimizu challenged Mituhisa Sunabe, the former Flyweight King Of Pancrase. and he became the new flyweight King Of Pancrase. He would go on to defend the title against Isao Hirose and Mitsuhisa Sunabe.

On April 3, 2011, Pancrase Inc. has changed from 125 lb In 120 lb weight limit of the flyweight. Pancrase was changed to "super flyweight" from the "flyweight" the name of the class 125 lb. And, Shimizu has been moved to the super flyweight King Of Pancrase. He would fight Sunabe for the third time and beat him through a majority decision, as well as defending against Seiji Ozuka.

On December 1, 2012, Shimizu successfully defended the Super Flyweight King of Pancrase title against top contender Yuki Yasunaga of the 3rd round via KO at main event of year end "Progress Tour", and would defend for the sixth time against Atsushi Yamamoto.

During Pancrase 273 he faced Ryuichi Miki in a flyweight Championship assessment bout, and lost a unanimous decision.

=== Shooto ===
Moving from Pancrase to other organizations he accumulated an 8–5 record. Unsuccessful in Vale Tudo Japan, he nevertheless achieved a remarkable 5–1 record with Shooto which earned him a chance to challenge for the Shooto Bantamweight (123 lb) Championship against Hiromasa Ougikubo. He would lose by way of TKO in the first round.

Shimizu was scheduled to fight Takahiro Kohori at Shooto 0531. He won the fight by a first-round TKO.

Shimizu was next scheduled to face Tatsuro Taira at Shooto 0329 on March 29, 2020. However, the event was cancelled due to the COVID-19 pandemic. The bout was then rebooked to take place at Shooto 1123 on November 23, 2020 and lost the fight via unanimous decision.

Shimizu faced Yuto Uda at Shooto 0516, on May 16, 2021. He lost the fight via unanimous decision.

Shimizu faced the undefeated Wataru Yamauchi at Shooto 2022 Vol.7 on November 27, 2022, in his retirement bout. He lost the fight by a first-round technical knockout.

== Championships and accomplishments ==
=== Kickboxing ===
- KAMINARIMON CLIMAX
  - 2007 KAMINARIMON CLIMAX 55 kg Amateur Tournament Championship

=== Sambo ===
- East Japan Sambo Championship
  - 7th East Japan Sambo 62 kg Championship

=== Mixed martial arts ===
- Pancrase
  - Pancrase Neo Blood Tournament Winner (2009)
  - Super Flyweight King of Pancrase Championship (One time; Former)
    - Six successful title defenses

== Mixed martial arts record ==
Professional record breakdown
46 matches	25 wins	18 losses
By knockout	12	2
By submission	4	1
By decision	9	15
Draws	3	

Res.	Record	Opponent	Method	Event	Date	Round	Time	Location	Notes
Loss	25–18–3	Wataru Yamauchi	TKO (punches)	Shooto – Professional Shooto 2022 Vol. 7	November 27, 2022	1	0:44	Tokyo, Japan	
Loss	25–17–3	Yuto Uda	Decision (unanimous)	Shooto – Professional Shooto 2021 Vol. 3	May 16, 2021	3	5:00	Tokyo, Japan	
Loss	25–16–3	Tatsuro Taira	Decision (unanimous)	Shooto 1123	November 23, 2020	3	5:00	Tokyo, Japan	
Win	25–15–3	Takahiro Kohori	TKO (Punches)	Shooto 0531	May 31, 2020	1	4:34	Tokyo, Japan	
Win	24–15–3	Shojin Miki	TKO (Punches)	Shooto - 30th Anniversary Tour 8th Round	November 24, 2019	1	4:19	Tokyo, Japan	
Win	23–15–3	Taiki Akiba	KO (Punch)	ONE Japan Series: Road to Century	September 1, 2019	1	2:15	Tokyo, Japan	
Loss	22–15–3	Hiromasa Ougikubo	Decision (unanimous)	Shooto 5/6 at Korakuen Hall: 30th Anniversary Tour	May 6, 2019	5	5:00	Tokyo, Japan	For Shooto Bantamweight (123 lb) Championship.
Win	22–14–3	Yoshiro Maeda	TKO (punches)	Shooto 1/27 at Korakuen Hall: 30th Anniversary Tour	January 27, 2019	1	4:37	Tokyo, Japan	
Win	21–14–3	Hayato Ishii	TKO (punches)	Shooto: Professional Shooto 9/23	September 23, 2018	1	4:09	Tokyo, Japan	
Win	20–14–3	Koki Naito	Decision (unanimous)	Shooto: Professional Shooto 7/15	July 15, 2018	3	5:00	Tokyo, Japan	
Loss	19–14–3	Yosuke Saruta	Decision (unanimous)	Shooto: Professional Shooto 1/28	January 28, 2018	3	5:00	Tokyo, Japan	
Win	19–13–3	Takaki Soya	KO (punches)	Shooto: Professional Shooto 5/12	May 12, 2017	3	0:32	Tokyo, Japan	
Win	18–13–3	Hiroshi Osato	KO (punch)	Shooto: Professional Shooto 3/24	March 24, 2017	1	3:44	Tokyo, Japan	
Win	17–13–3	Takahiro Furumaki	Decision (unanimous)	Tribe Tokyo Fight: TTF Challenge 06	September 19, 2016	3	5:00	Nerima, Tokyo, Japan	
Loss	16–13–3	Ryuichi Miki	Decision (unanimous)	Pancrase 273	December 13, 2015	3	5:00	Tokyo, Japan	
Loss	16–12–3	Masaaki Sugawara	Decision (split)	Vale Tudo Japan: 7th	September 13, 2015	3	5:00	Urayasu, Chiba, Japan	
Loss	16–11–3	Takeshi Kasugai	Decision (split)	Vale Tudo Japan: VTJ in Osaka	June 21, 2015	3	5:00	Osaka, Japan	
Loss	16–10–3	Yusaku Nakamura	Decision (split)	Tribe Tokyo Fight: TTF Challenge 04	April 5, 2015	3	5:00	Tokyo, Japan	
Win	16–9–3	Yuya Shibata	KO (slam and punches)	Deep - Dream Special 2014: Omisoka Special	December 31, 2014	1	2:41	Saitama, Japan	
Win	15–9–3	Yasutaka Ishigami	TKO (doctor stoppage)	Tribe Tokyo Fight: TTF Challenge 02	September 13, 2014	1	5:00	Tokyo, Japan	
Win	14–9–3	Atsushi Yamamoto	TKO (soccer kicks)	Pancrase - 257	March 30, 2014	1	4:54	Yokohama, Japan	Defended the Pancrase Flyweight Championship.
Loss	13–9–3	Yuki Motoya	Decision (unanimous)	Deep - 64 Impact	December 22, 2013	3	5:00	Tokyo, Japan	
Loss	13–8–3	Kentaro Watanabe	Decision (split)	Shooto - 3rd Round 2013	July 27, 2013	3	5:00	Tokyo, Japan	
Win	13–7–3	Fumihiro Kitahara	Decision (majority)	Shooto - Gig Tokyo 13	February 16, 2013	3	5:00	Tokyo, Japan	
Win	12–7–3	Yuki Yasunaga	KO (punch)	Pancrase - Progress Tour 14	December 1, 2012	3	2:02	Tokyo, Japan	Defended the Pancrase Flyweight Championship.
Win	11–7–3	Masaaki Sugawara	Decision (unanimous)	Shooto - Gig Tokyo 11	August 25, 2012	3	5:00	Tokyo, Japan	
Loss	10–7–3	Haruo Ochi	Decision (majority)	Shooto - 3rd Round	March 10, 2012	3	5:00	Tokyo, Japan	
Draw	10–6–3	Seiji Ozuka	Draw (majority)	Pancrase - Progress Tour 1	January 28, 2012	3	5:00	Tokyo, Japan	Retained the Pancrase Flyweight Championship.
Loss	10–6–2	Shinichi Kojima	Decision (unanimous)	Shooto: Shooto the Shoot 2011	November 5, 2011	3	5:00	Tokyo, Japan	
Win	10–5–2	Mitsuhisa Sunabe	Decision (majority)	Pancrase: Impressive Tour 5	June 5, 2011	3	5:00	Tokyo, Japan	Defended the Pancrase Flyweight Championship.
Win	9–5–2	Junya Kodo	Submission (rear-naked choke)	Shooto: Shootor's Legacy 2	April 1, 2011	2	3:16	Tokyo, Japan	
Win	8–5–2	Ichiro Sugita	Decision (split)	World Victory Road Presents: Soul of Fight	December 30, 2010	1	5:00	Tokyo, Japan	
Draw	7–5–2	Mitsuhisa Sunabe	Draw	Pancrase: Passion Tour 11	December 5, 2010	3	5:00	Tokyo, Japan	Retained the Pancrase Flyweight Championship.
Win	7–5–1	Isao Hirose	TKO (doctor stoppage)	Pancrase: Passion Tour 6	July 4, 2010	2	3:06	Tokyo, Japan	Defended the Pancrase Flyweight Championship.
Win	6–5–1	Mitsuhisa Sunabe	Decision (majority)	Pancrase: Passion Tour 1	February 7, 2010	3	5:00	Tokyo, Japan	Won the Pancrase Flyweight Championship.
Loss	5–5–1	Mamoru Yamaguchi	Decision (majority)	Shooto: Revolutionary Exchanges 3	November 23, 2009	3	5:00	Tokyo, Japan	
Win	5–4–1	Takuya Eizumi	Decision (unanimous)	Pancrase: Changing Tour 6	October 25, 2009	2	5:00	Tokyo, Japan	
Win	4–4–1	Yuichiro Yajima	Decision (unanimous)	Pancrase: Changing Tour 4	August 8, 2009	2	5:00	Tokyo, Japan	Neo Blood Tournament 2009 Flyweight Finals.
Win	3–4–1	Takuma Ishii	Submission (rear-naked choke)	Pancrase: Changing Tour 3	June 7, 2009	1	4:00	Tokyo, Japan	Neo Blood Tournament 2009 Flyweight Semifinals.
Win	2–4–1	Toshihiro Shimizu	Submission (rear-naked choke)	Pancrase: Changing Tour 2	April 5, 2009	2	0:59	Tokyo, Japan	Neo Blood Tournament 2009 Flyweight Quarterfinals.
Loss	1–4–1	Yasuhiro Urushitani	TKO (doctor stoppage)	Cage Force EX Eastern Bound	November 8, 2008	1	3:06	Tokyo, Japan	
Draw	1–3–1	Takuma Ishii	Draw	Pancrase: Shining 8	October 1, 2008	2	5:00	Tokyo, Japan	
Loss	1–3	Mitsuhisa Sunabe	Decision (unanimous)	Pancrase: Real 2008	June 29, 2008	2	5:00	Tokyo, Japan	
Loss	1–2	Toshihiro Shimizu	Submission (armbar)	Pancrase: Shining 3	April 27, 2008	1	4:32	Tokyo, Japan	
Loss	1–1	Ryota Sasaki	Decision (unanimous)	Pancrase: 2008 Neo-Blood Tournament Eliminations	March 23, 2008	2	3:00	Tokyo, Japan	
Win	1–0	Takuma Ishii	Submission (rear-naked choke)	Pancrase: 2008 Neo-Blood Tournament Eliminations	March 23, 2008	1	1:30	Tokyo, Japan	

=== Mixed martial arts amateur record ===
Amateur record breakdown		
1 match	1 win	0 losses
By submission	1	0

Res.	Record	Opponent	Method	Event	Date	Round	Time	Location	Notes
Win	1–0	Atsushi Kawakami	Submission (rear-naked choke)	Pancrase: Hybrid Bout in Utsunomiya 3	October 27, 2007	1	3:35	Utsunomiya, Tochigi, Japan	

== See also ==
- List of current mixed martial arts champions
- List of male mixed martial artists
