= Shingo Suzuki (mixed martial artist) =

Japanese martial artist

- 鈴木槙吾
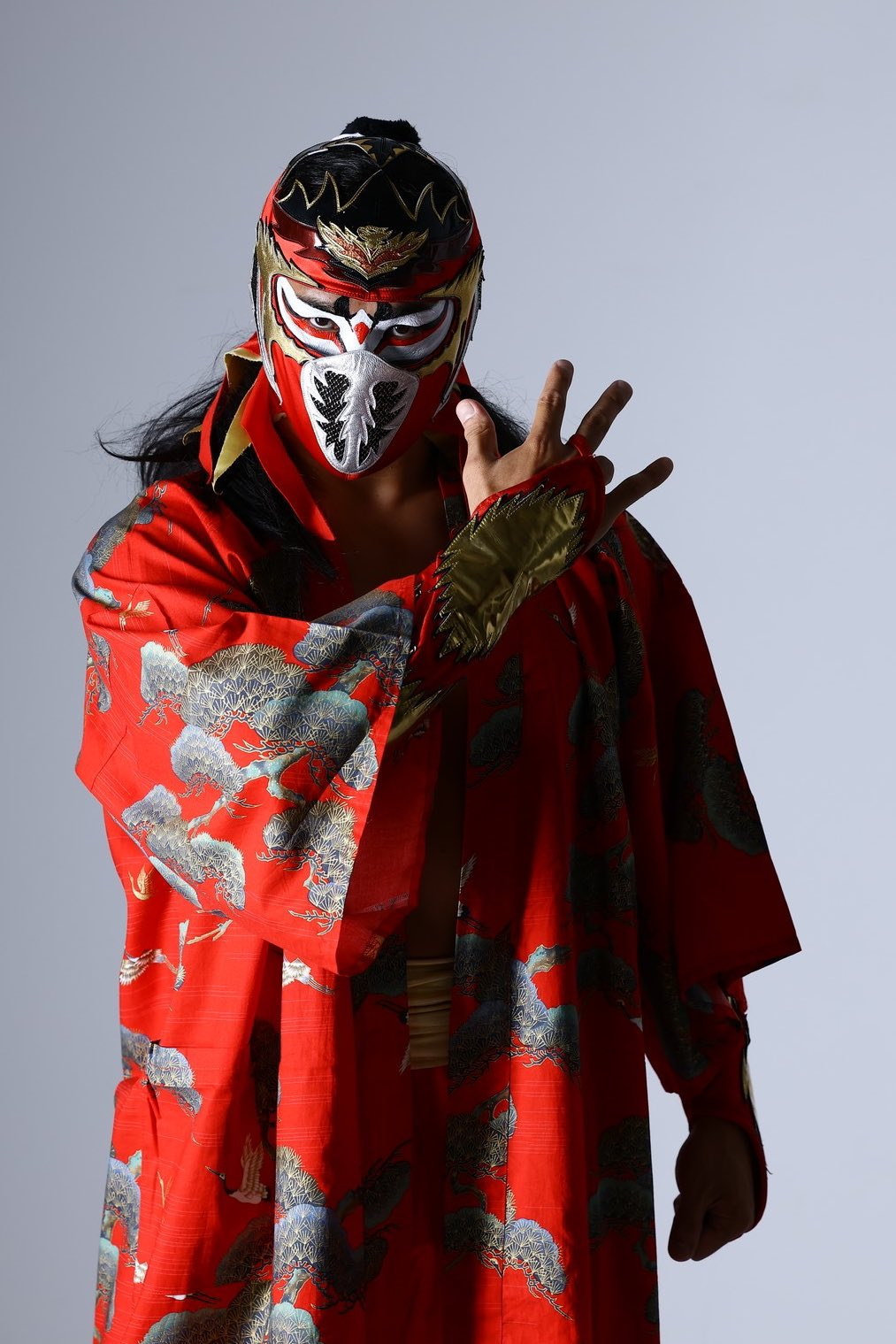
- Suzuki as Hayabusa in 2025
- Born: April 30, 1986 (age 40); Kakegawa, Shizuoka, Japan
- Martial arts career
- Nationality: Japanese
- Height: 172 cm (5 ft 8 in)
- Weight: 77 kg (170 lb; 12 st 2 lb)
- Division: Welterweight
- Stance: Orthodox
- Team: Mil Gracias
- Years active: 2006–2024

Kickboxing record
- Total: 2
- Wins: 1
- By knockout: 1
- Losses: 1
- By knockout: 1

Mixed martial arts record
- Total: 30
- Wins: 13
- By knockout: 8
- By submission: 4
- By decision: 1
- Losses: 15
- By knockout: 8
- By submission: 5
- By decision: 2
- Draws: 2

Amateur record
- Total: 4
- Wins: 2
- By knockout: 1
- By submission: 2
- Losses: 1
- Draws: 1

Other information
- Mixed martial arts record from Sherdog
- Last updated on: February 13, 2026
- Professional wrestling career
- Ring names: Hayabusa (II); Raicho; Shingo; Shingo Suzuki
- Billed height: 172 cm (5 ft 8 in)
- Billed weight: 85 kg (187 lb)
- Debut: August 23, 2014

Shingo Suzuki (鈴木 槙吾, Suzuki Shingo; born April 30, 1986) is a Japanese mixed martial artist and professional wrestler. He is signed to Pro Wrestling Zero1, where he performs as the second incarnation of Hayabusa (ハヤブサ; "Falcon"), a character formerly portrayed by Eiji Ezaki in Frontier Martial-Arts Wrestling (FMW) between 1994 and 2001. He also appears on the Japanese independent scene both as Hayabusa and under the mononymous ring name Shingo. As a martial artist, he previously competed for Pancrase, Shooto and most recently for Deep. He is a former Welterweight King of Pancrase as well as a former Deep Welterweight Champion.

He made his professional wrestling debut in 2014 with a single appearance at a Hard Hit-branded DDT Pro-Wrestling event. He made his second debut in 2019 for Pro Wrestling Zero1, where he went by the ring name Raicho (stylized in all caps as RAICHO).

== Mixed martial arts career ==
=== Amateur career (2006–2008) ===
On November 26, 2006, Suzuki won the 8th Amateur Pancrase Open Tournament in the 120 kg division.

On February 12, 2007, Suzuki made his recorded amateur debut at ZST.12, where he lost to Tatsuhiko Nishizaka in a light heavyweight bout on the Genesis preliminary card. After that, he competed in three Pancrase Gate bouts during the 2007 Rising Tour and 2008 Shining Tour.

He had his first win against Kenji Narita on August 27, 2008, at Pancrase: Shining 6 in Tokyo.

=== Pancrase (2009–2016) ===
Suzuki made his professional debut at Pancrase: Changing Tour 1 on February 1, 2009, in a welterweight bout against Strasser Kiichi which he lost by submission. On October 17, he defeated Tomoyoshi Iwamiya, the No. 1 ranked welterweight in Pancrase.

On February 7, 2010, Suzuki faced Kengo Ura to determine the next Welterweight King of Pancrase contender, but was defeated by knockout in the first round.

On July 29, 2012, Suzuki won the 10th Pro-Am Open Catch Wrestling Tournament in the 80 kg category.

On February 3, 2013, at Pancrase 245, Suzuki defeated Sojiro Orui in the final round of a tournament to determine the next Welterweight King of Pancrase contender. He faced champion Takenori Sato at Pancrase 247 on May 19, but lost by submission in the third round.

On May 31, 2015, at Pancrase 267, Suzuki faced welterweight champion Let's Gota in a non-title bout and won by technical knockout in the second round. He faced Gota again in his very next fight at Pancrase 270 on October 4, and captured the welterweight title by submission in the second round. He lost the welterweight title to Akihiro Murayama in his first defense at Pancrase 276 on March 13, 2016.

Suzuki's final bout with the promotion was a submission loss against Yushin Okami at Pancrase 279 on July 24, 2016.

=== Shooto (2017–2018) ===
Upon joining Shooto in March 2017, Suzuki dropped to the lightweight class. On May 12, in his first Shooto fight, he faced Yuki Tencho Kawana and was knocked out in the first round. Suzuki then faced Yuki Okano on October 15. The fight ended in a 1–1 split draw decision. However, a post-fight investigation revealed judge Kyosuke Watanabe had mistakenly reversed the scores for Suzuki and Okano on his scorecard. Consequently, the decision was overturned to a 0–2 loss for Suzuki, and Watanabe was reprimanded for his mistake.

On March 25, 2018, Suzuki faced former judo medalist Shutaro "Captain Africa" Debana and lost by submission in the first round. Following the match, he left the Alliance dojo and accepted Takuya Sugi's invitation to transition from mixed martial arts to professional wrestling.

=== Deep (2022–2024) ===
On August 21, 2022, at Deep 109 Impact, Suzuki faced Ryuichiro Sumimura in the welterweight division and won by technical knockout in the first round, marking his successful return to MMA after a four-year hiatus.

Suzuki fought Daichi Abe at Deep 112 Impact on February 11, 2023, and won the Deep Welterweight Championship by submission in the second round. He lost the title to Yoichiro Sato at Deep 120 Impact on July 14, 2024.

Suzuki's final bout to date was at Deep Tokyo Impact 2024 6th Round on December 8, where he lost by submission to Ibuki Shimada.

== Professional wrestling career ==
=== Early career (2014) ===
Suzuki made his first professional wrestling appearance at Hard Hit: G-generation on August 23, 2014. This event was produced by DDT Pro-Wrestling's MMA-oriented brand, Hard Hit, which was managed at the time by Hikaru Sato and heavily inspired by UWF rules. At the event, Suzuki defeated Michael Nakazawa by submission.

=== Pro Wrestling Zero1 (2019–2020) ===
After suspending his MMA career in 2018, Suzuki began transitioning to professional wrestling at Takuya Sugi's suggestion. He made his second debut with Pro Wrestling Zero1, at Sugi's 15th anniversary event held in Korakuen Hall on February 11, 2019. At the event, he teamed with Naoki Tanizaki to take on Masato Tanaka and Yuji Hino, ultimately falling short. The following month, in the opening bout of Zero1's 18th Anniversary Show on March 3, he teamed with the Kubota Brothers and defeated Yuko Miyamoto, Super Tiger and Shoki Kitamura. On March 31, at the 16th Yamato Shinshu Chikara Festival, a Hono Pro-Wrestling event produced by Zero1 at the Yasukuni Shrine Sumo Ring, he debuted the masked character of Raicho (stylized in all caps as RAICHO) when he teamed with Shogun Okamoto to defeat Kohei Sato and Sugi. Throughout the following year, he engaged in a rivalry against Sugi which saw them face each other in the second round of the 2019 Tenkaichi Junior tournament on September 1. Raicho lost the match and was eliminated from the tournament.

On January 26, 2020, at the New Year Osaka event, Raicho unsuccessfully challenged Hub for the NWA World & International Junior Heavyweight Championship. On May 3, Raicho and Sugi began teaming together and defeated the Revengers duo of Takuya Sugawara and Yasu Kubota. In July, Raicho entered the 2020 Tenkaichi Junior tournament. He defeated Sugi in his first match on July 24, but was eliminated by Shoki Kitamura in the semifinals on July 26. On October 4, at the 20th Autumn Flame Festival in Osaka, Sugi and Raicho defeated Hub and Billyken Kid to win the NWA International Lightweight Tag Team Championship. On December 20, they were eliminated in the first round of the 2020 Furinkazan Tag Tournament by #StrongHearts (T-Hawk and El Lindaman). The following week, it was announced that Sugi's exclusive contract with Zero1 would end on December 31. Sugi left Zero1 to work as a freelancer, and he was quickly followed by Raicho, after which the NWA International Lightweight Tag Team Championship was vacated.

=== Japanese independent circuit (2021–present) ===
In early 2021, Sugi and Yuji Hino formed the stable Only We. They aimed to produce an independent charity event at the Active Advance Pro Wrestling's 2AW Square dojo in Chiba on January 30. They were quickly joined by Suzuki, who changed his ring name to Shingo, and Quiet Storm. Titled Voyage vol. 1, the event was pushed back twice: first to March 6 and then to May 23. In the main event, Only We (Hino, Sugi, Shingo and Quiet Storm) were defeated by Shogun Okamoto, Hoshitango, Akira Raijin and Masato Shibata. Suzuki made his debut in Kazuhiro Tamura's Pro-Wrestling Heat-Up promotion on July 10, 2021, where he faced Tetsuya Izuchi in a grappling sparring match.

In early 2022, Only We disbanded, so Suzuki and Sugi associated with designer and illustrator Jenny to form a new team called Mil Gracias. In February 2022, Suzuki began competing on a regular basis for Heat-Up under the name Shingo. On August 14, Shingo unsuccessfully challenged Daisuke Kanehira for the Heat-Up Universal Championship. On December 8, Shingo made an appearance in Strong Style Pro-Wrestling, teaming with Hayato Mashita to defeat Black Tiger and Fuminori Abe. Sugi and Raicho made their Kyushu Pro-Wrestling debut on October 30, 2022, at Kurume ba Genki ni Suruttai!, where they defeated Mentai☆Kid and Naoki Sakurajima.

On January 3, 2023, Sugi and Raicho won the Kyushu Pro-Wrestling Tag Team Championship from Barikara High Tension (Mentai☆Kid and Tomato Kaji). The next month, they successfully defended the title against Asosan and Naoki Sakurajima. On May 7, they lost the title to Kusuo (Hitamaru Sasaki and Kota Umeda), marking their last appearance with the company. The next month, they successfully defended the title against Asosan and Naoki Sakurajima. On May 7, they lost the title to Kusuo (Hitamaru Sasaki and Kota Umeda), marking their last appearance with the company. On June 25, 2023, Shingo unsuccessfully challenged Tamura for the Heat-Up Universal Championship. On August 16, Shingo teamed with Shingo Aihara (wrestling as SHINGO) to face Mitsuya Nagai and Tatsuhito Takaiwa in a losing effort.

On January 21, 2024, Shingo teamed with Hajime to unsuccessfully challenge Daichi Satoh and Tomoki Hatano for the Heat-Up Universal Tag Team Championship. Throughout 2024 and 2025, Suzuki then continued to compete in mostly tag team matches. His final match with the company was a loss against the Kubota Brothers on September 20, 2025, alongside Shingo Aihara.

Throughout 2025, Suzuki continued to appear as Hayabusa mainly in Zero1, while still occasionally wrestling unmasked as Shingo for Heat-Up and Aihara Pro. On October 30, at ChocoPro 485: Emi Sakura 30th Anniversary "Cult Heroine", Hayabusa and Masato Tanaka defeated Baliyan Akki and Chris Brookes. I

=== All Japan Pro Wrestling (2021–2022) ===
On December 26, 2021, Suzuki reprised his role as Raicho and competed alongside Sugi in the Jr. Tag Battle of Glory tournament, hosted by All Japan Pro Wrestling (AJPW). They defeated Purple Haze (Izanagi and Masashi Takeda) in the first round, but were eliminated by Total Eclipse (Hokuto Omori and Yusuke Kodama), the eventual winners, in the semifinals. Sugi and Raicho made their final AJPW appearance on day 2 on the 2022 Champion Carnival tour on April 10, where they defeated Izanagi and Shigehiro Irie.

=== Return to Zero1 (2023–present) ===
==== Championship pursuits (2023–2024) ====
On July 29, 2023, Suzuki (under the name Shingo) returned to Zero1 during the 23rd Zero1 Midsummer Festival tour, where he teamed with Hikaru Sato to defeat Satsuki Nagao and Yuki Toki. The following month, at en event co-produced between referee Punch Tawara, Zero1 and Big Japan Pro Wrestling, Shingo and Sato teamed again to defeat Nagao and Takuya Nomura. In September, Shingo entered the 2023 Tenkaichi Junior tournament. He defeated Leo Isaka in the first round, Bambeat in the semifinals, but lost to Ryo Hoshino in the final. In November, Shingo entered the Furinkazan Tag Tournament with Hoshino. Together, they defeated Satsuki Nagao and Kamikaze in the first round, two masked Astro Blacks in the second round, and were eliminated by Real Zero1 (Masato Tanaka and Yoshikazu Yokoyama) in the semifinals. On December 27, Shingo entered the tournament held by Taka Michinoku to crown a new Independent World Junior Heavyweight Champion. He defeated Takahiro Hirakimoto in the first round, but lost to Fire Katsumi in the second round.

After touring with Pro-Wrestling Heat-Up in early 2024, Suzuki returned to Zero1's associate promotion, Tochigi Pro-Wrestling, in June as Raicho. There, he entered the Albuquerque Cup Junior Tag Tournament with Andy Wu. They defeated Tatsuhito Takaiwa and Yuki Toki in the first round, but lost to Takumi Baba and Takuya Sugawara in the semifinals.

==== Hayabusa (2025–present) ====
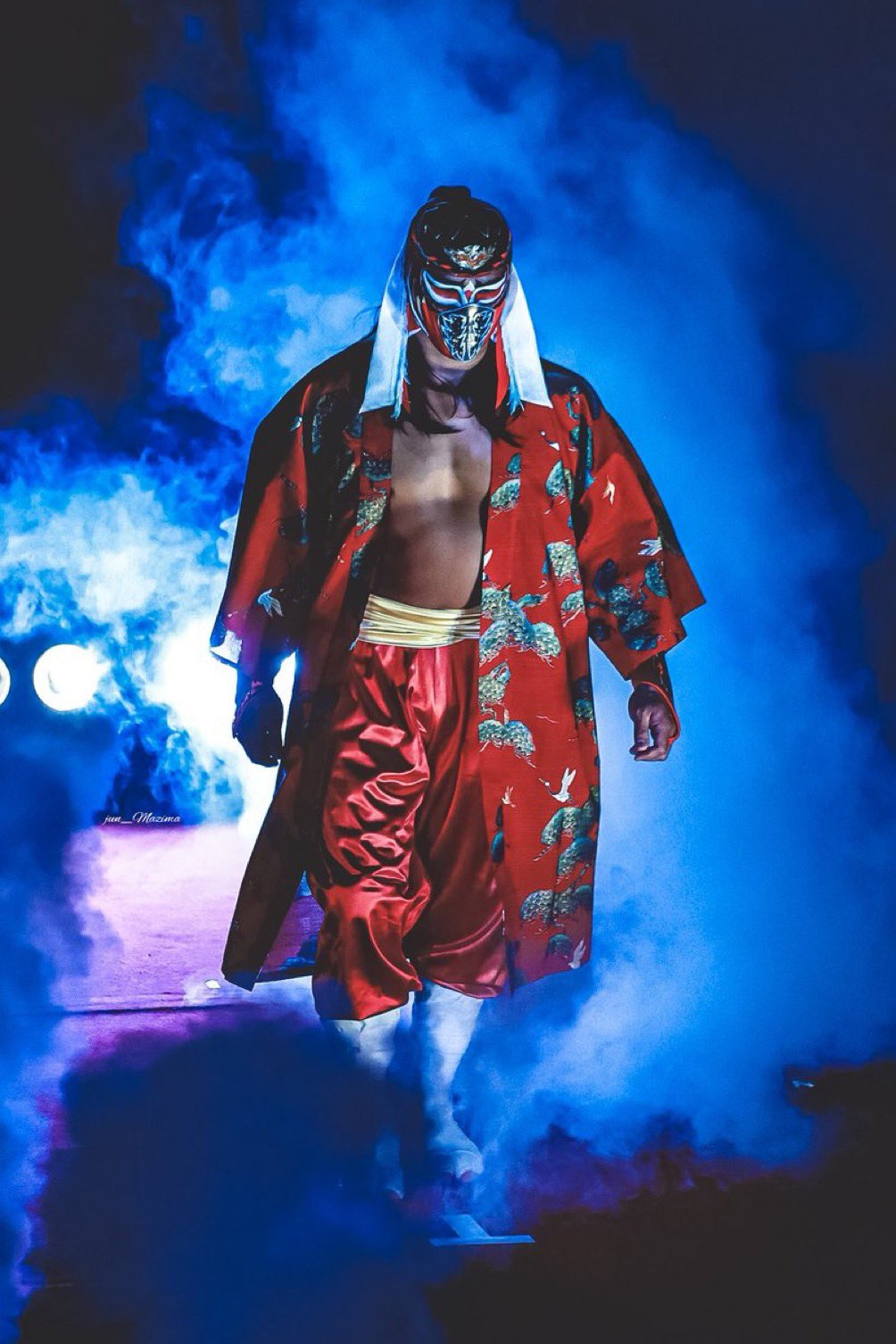
The new Hayabusa making his debut in 2025

On January 8, 2025, general manager Megumi Kudo and Masato Tanaka,announced the return of the Hayabusa character, portrayed by Eiji Ezaki from 1994 to 2001, and a singles match between Hayabusa and Tanaka for April 27 at Ryōgoku Kokugikan. At the event, Suzuki, who is widely believed to be the one portraying the new Hayabusa, defeated Tanaka. From June to July, Hayabusa took part in the 2025 Fire Festival, where he advanced to the final with a record of four wins and one draw earning him 23 points. In the final, he defeated Chris Vice and was awarded the Fire Sword. On August 3, Hayabusa and Tanaka had a Mask vs. Career rematch that went to a time limit draw. On August 17, Hayabusa made his Pro Wrestling Freedoms debut in a special appearance at the Yokohama Budokan where he defeated Mammoth Sasaki. On September 21, at an independent event celebrating Masakatsu Funaki's 40th debut anniversary, Hayabusa teamed up with Funaki to defeat Kuroshio Tokyo Japan and Ren Ayabe in the main event. Jushin Thunder Liger was the special guest referee. In December, Hayabusa and Jinsei Shinzaki entered the 2025 Furinkazan Tag Tournament, defeating Masato Tanaka and Vent Vert Jack in the first round, Daichi Hashimoto and Yuya Aoki in the semifinals, but losing to Junya Matsunaga and Tsugutaka Sato in the final for the vacant Intercontinental Tag Team Championship.

=== Pro Wrestling Noah (2026) ===
On January 26, 2026, Hayabusa made his Pro Wrestling Noah debut in the opening match of Monday Magic Rising Sun Season ep. 2, where he teamed with Alejandro and Dragon Kid to defeat Hayata, Mazada and Shuji Kondo.

== Professional wrestling persona ==
While Zero1 is keeping the new Hayabusa's identity a secret, many believe that Suzuki is portraying him based on his physique and his schedule.

Unlike promotions such as NJPW, which formally acknowledge successive incarnations of masked characters – for example recognizing Yoshihiro Yamazaki as the fourth generation Tiger Mask and styling him as Fourth Generation Golden Tiger (黄金の虎4代目, Ōgon no Tora Yon-daime) – and similar lineage-based gimmicks such as Ebessan in Osaka Pro Wrestling, Pro Wrestling Zero1 has presented the 2025 return of Hayabusa as the revival of the same character rather than as a new generational successor. Although Suzuki is not the original wrestler, Eiji Ezaki, Zero1 has not designated the character with a numerical suffix (such as "Hayabusa II") nor officially framed it as a second-generation version. Nevertheless, some external websites and databases have referred to the revived character as Hayabusa II. This designation is unofficial and potentially inaccurate, as the Hayabusa persona had previously been portrayed by other wrestlers, most notably Mr. Gannosuke during the period in which Ezaki performed under the H persona, and on a couple occasions by Genichiro Tenryu. As a result, while the current portrayal represents the first revival of the character since Ezaki's death, it is not necessarily the second chronological incarnation of the Hayabusa persona.

== Mixed martial arts record ==
Professional record breakdown
30 matches	13 wins	15 losses
By knockout	8	8
By submission	4	5
By decision	1	2
Draws	2	

Res.	Record	Opponent	Method	Event	Date	Round	Time	Location	Notes
Loss	13–15–2	Ibuki Shimada	Submission (triangle armbar)	Deep Tokyo Impact 2024 6th Round	December 8, 2024	1	1:28	Tokyo, Japan	
Loss	13–14–2	Yoichiro Sato	KO (punches)	Deep 120 Impact	July 14, 2024	1	2:03	Tokyo, Japan	Lost the Deep Welterweight Championship.
Loss	13–13–2	Choi Jun-seo	TKO (punches)	Deep 115 Impact: Deep vs. Black Combat	September 18, 2023	1	2:29	Tokyo, Japan	Middleweight bout.
Win	13–12–2	Daichi Abe	Submission (guillotine choke)	Deep 112 Impact	February 11, 2023	1	3:35	Tokyo, Japan	Won the Deep Welterweight Championship.
Win	12–12–2	Ryuichiro Sumimura	TKO (punches)	Deep 109 Impact	August 21, 2022	1	3:35	Tokyo, Japan	Return to Welterweight.
Loss	11–12–2	Shutaro Debana	Submission (armbar)	Professional Shooto Korakuen Hall Event	March 25, 2018	1	1:25	Tokyo, Japan	
Loss	11–11–2	Yuki Okano	Decision (majority)	Professional Shooto	October 15, 2017	3	5:00	Chiba, Japan	Originally a split draw decision; overturned after a clerical error was discovered.
Loss	11–10–2	Yuki Tencho Kawana	KO (punch)	Professional Shooto Korakuen Hall Event	May 12, 2017	1	0:21	Tokyo, Japan	Lightweight debut.
Loss	11–9–2	Yushin Okami	Submission (rear-naked choke)	Pancrase 279	July 24, 2016	1	2:06	Tokyo, Japan	
Loss	11–8–2	Akihiro Murayama	KO (punches)	Pancrase 276	March 13, 2016	4	3:33	Tokyo, Japan	Lost the Pancrase Welterweight Championship.
Win	11–7–2	Gota Yamashita	Submission (rear-naked choke)	Pancrase 270	October 4, 2015	2	3:56	Tokyo, Japan	Won the Pancrase Welterweight Championship.
Win	10–7–2	Gota Yamashita	TKO (punches)	Pancrase 267	May 31, 2015	2	2:22	Tokyo, Japan	
Win	9–7–2	Yuki Kondo	TKO (punches)	Pancrase 265	March 15, 2015	1	4:56	Tokyo, Japan	
Loss	8–7–2	Akihiro Murayama	TKO (punches)	Pancrase 263	December 6, 2014	3	0:27	Tokyo, Japan	
Win	8–6–2	David Marshall	TKO (punches)	Pancrase 259	June 29, 2014	2	3:39	Tokyo, Japan	
Loss	7–6–2	Thiago Jambo Goncalves	KO (punch)	Pancrase 253	November 3, 2013	1	0:26	Tokyo, Japan	
Loss	7–5–2	Takenori Sato	Submission (keylock)	Pancrase 247	May 19, 2013	3	2:36	Tokyo, Japan	For the Pancrase Welterweight Championship.
Win	7–4–2	Sojiro Orui	KO (punch)	Pancrase 245	February 3, 2013	2	3:29	Tokyo, Japan	Won the Welterweight King of Pancrase Contendership Tournament.
Win	6–4–2	Eiji Ishikawa	Decision (unanimous)	Pancrase: Progress Tour 14	December 1, 2012	3	5:00	Tokyo, Japan	Welterweight King of Pancrase Contendership Tournament B Block match.
Win	5–4–2	Kenta Takagi	KO (punch)	Pancrase: Progress Tour 3	March 11, 2012	1	0:20	Tokyo, Japan	
Loss	4–4–2	Kei Yamamiya	TKO (punches)	Pancrase: Impressive Tour 13	December 3, 2011	1	4:24	Tokyo, Japan	
Win	4–3–2	Akihiro Yamazaki	Submission (heel hook)	Pancrase: Impressive Tour 9	September 4, 2011	1	4:01	Tokyo, Japan	
Draw	3–3–2	Kosei Kubota	Draw (split)	Pancrase: Impressive Tour 5	June 5, 2011	2	5:00	Tokyo, Japan	
Win	3–3–1	Seiki Ryo	KO (punch)	Pancrase: Impressive Tour 3	April 3, 2011	1	0:45	Tokyo, Japan	
Loss	2–3–1	Takenori Sato	Decision (unanimous)	Pancrase: Passion Tour 11	December 5, 2010	3	5:00	Tokyo, Japan	
Loss	2–2–1	Kengo Ura	TKO (punches)	Pancrase: Passion Tour 1	February 7, 2010	1	1:43	Tokyo, Japan	
Win	2–1–1	Tomoyoshi Iwamiya	TKO (punches and soccer kicks)	Pancrase: Changing Tour 5	October 17, 2009	1	2:16	Tokyo, Japan	
Win	1–1–1	Asaki Honda	Submission (near-naked choke)	Pancrase: Changing Tour 4	August 8, 2009	1	0:42	Tokyo, Japan	
Draw	0–1–1	Kosei Kubota	Draw (unanimous)	Pancrase: Changing Tour 3	June 7, 2009	2	5:00	Tokyo, Japan	
Loss	0–1	Strasser Kiichi	Technical submission (arm-triangle choke)	Pancrase: Changing Tour 1	February 1, 2009	1	3:00	Tokyo, Japan	

Amateur record breakdown		
4 matches	2 wins	1 loss
By knockout	0	1
By submission	2	0
Draws	1	

Res.	Record	Opponent	Method	Event	Date	Round	Time	Location	Notes
Win	2–1–1	Makoto Kawawa	Submission (armbar)	Pancrase: Shining Tour 10	December 7, 2008	1	1:13	Tokyo, Japan	
Win	1–1–1	Kenji Narita	Submission (armbar)	Pancrase: Shining Tour 6	August 27, 2008	2	3:56	Tokyo, Japan	
Draw	0–1–1	Yuji Fujioka	Draw (time limit)	Pancrase: Rising Tour 4	April 27, 2007	2	5:00	Tokyo, Japan	
Loss	0–1	Tatsuhiko Nishizaka	KO (punches)	ZST.12	February 12, 2007	1	4:16	Tokyo, Japan	

== Submission grappling record ==
Result	Opponent	Method	Event	Date	Round	Time	Notes
Win	(Japan) Hirokazu Takamoto	Decision (unanimous)	Pancrase: 2012 Progress Tour	July 29, 2012	N/A	N/A	Won the 10th Pro-Am Open Catch Wrestling 80 kg Tournament.
Win	(Japan) Katana Nishimura	Submission (front choke)	Pancrase: 2012 Progress Tour	July 29, 2012	N/A	3:11	10th Pro-Am Open Catch Wrestling 80 kg Tournament Semifinal.
Draw	(Japan) Tatsuhiko Nishizaka	Draw (time limit)	SWAT!-GX1	August 12, 2007	2	5:00	Light Heavyweight bout.

== Lethwei record ==
Professional Lethwei record
1 win, 1 loss
Date	Result	Opponent	Event	Location	Method	Round	Time
2021-07-22	Win	(Japan) Yuki Sakamoto	Lethwei × Unbeatable 1	Tokyo, Japan	Decision (unanimous)	2	5:00
2019-05-17	Loss	(New Zealand) Ty Williams	Lethwei in Japan 12: Proof of the Brave	Tokyo, Japan	TKO (knockdowns)	1	2:22
Legend: Win Loss Draw/no contest Notes

== Championships and accomplishments ==
=== Mixed martial arts ===
- Deep
  - Deep Welterweight Championship (1 time)
- Pancrase
  - Welterweight King of Pancrase (1 time)
  - 8th Amateur Pancrase Open 120 kg Tournament (2006)
  - 10th Pancrase Pro-Am Open Catch Wrestling 80 kg Tournament (2012)

=== Professional wrestling ===
- Kyushu Pro-Wrestling
  - Kyushu Pro-Wrestling Tag Team Championship (1 time) – with Sugi
- Pro Wrestling Zero1
  - NWA International Lightweight Tag Team Championship (1 time) – with Sugi
  - Fire Festival (2025)
