= Yukio Sakaguchi =

Japanese martial artist

- 坂口征夫
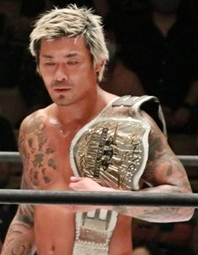
- Sakaguchi as KO-D 6-Man Tag Team Champion in 2020
- Born: July 26, 1973 (age 53); Meguro-ku, Tokyo, Japan
- Height: 177 cm (5 ft 10 in)
- Relatives: Seiji Sakaguchi (father); Kenji Sakaguchi (brother)
- Martial arts career
- Nationality: Japanese
- Weight: 74.2 kg (164 lb)
- Division: Lightweight
- Stance: Orthodox
- Fighting out of: Saitama, Saitama, Japan
- Team: Sakaguchi Dojo(2006–present); Yoshida Dojo (2008); Sengoku Training Players (2010)
- Rank: A-Class Shootist; 2nd dan black belt in Judo; Black belt in Shōrin-ryū; Black belt in Kyokushin kaikan; Purple belt in Brazilian Jiu-Jitsu
- Years active: 2006–present

Mixed martial arts record
- Total: 13
- Wins: 6
- By knockout: 3
- By submission: 2
- By decision: 1
- Losses: 7
- By knockout: 3
- By submission: 4

Other information
- University: University of Tokyo - Bachelor of Engineering
- Mixed martial arts record from Sherdog
- Sponsored by Ameba and Vibram FiveFingers Last updated on: September 30, 2013
- Professional wrestling career
- Ring name(s): Yukio Collection A.T. Yukio Sakaguchi
- Billed height: 1.77 m (5 ft 10 in)
- Billed weight: 77 kg (170 lb)
- Billed from: Saitama Prefecture
- Trained by: Seiji Sakaguchi; DDT Dojo; Sanshiro Takagi
- Debut: March 22, 2012
- Retired: February 7, 2024

Yukio Sakaguchi (坂口 征夫, Sakaguchi Yukio; born July 26, 1973) is a Japanese former professional mixed martial artist, professional wrestler, actor and judoka. In professional wrestling, he is primarily known for his tenure with DDT Pro-Wrestling, but has fought and competed for All Japan Pro Wrestling, World Victory Road, DREAM, Tokyo Joshi Pro-Wrestling, Pancrase, Pro Wrestling Wave, S-Cup, Shooto, Big Japan Pro Wrestling, Union Pro Wrestling, Kaientai Dojo, Dradition, Legend The Pro-Wrestling and K-1. Sakaguchi is known for his fight with Nigerian K-1 kickboxer, Film actor and male model Andy Ologun. Yukio is the son of former judoka and professional wrestling legend Seiji Sakaguchi and the older brother of actor Kenji Sakaguchi, who notably co-starred in Ikebukuro West Gate Park when the television show made its debut run in 2000 and most recently in 2012 started making regular appearances on the show Saigo Kara Nibanme no Koi, he also co-starred in the film Face.

In 2009 Yukio was featured in Kamui Gaiden; the film was a box office hit in Japan and the Netherlands. After positive reviews on Yukio's performance he was later chosen to play a small supporting role in the sequel to Ninja Assassin, set to be released in 2014, but never materialized after the project was put into development hell.

In October 2012 Sakaguchi signed a multi-fight deal with Pancrase and in January 2013 re-signed with DDT for the rest of that year. He is a former one-time KO-D Openweight Champion, two-time KO-D Tag Team Champion, nine-time KO-D 6-Man Tag Team Champions and the winner of the 2015 King of DDT tournament.

== Professional wrestling career ==
Sakaguchi made his professional wrestling debut on March 22, 2012, when he defeated Michael Nakazawa at a Hard Hit event, a mixed martial arts inspired sub-brand of DDT Pro-Wrestling (DDT). He was then drafted as part of the New World Japan (nWJ) stable, and made his DDT main card debut on July 22, when he and stablemates Sanshiro Takagi and Soma Takao defeated Hikaru Sato, Michael Nakazawa and Tanomusaku Toba in a six-man tag team match, with Sakaguchi once again submitting Nakazawa for the win. On August 18, Sakaguchi took part in DDT's fifteenth anniversary event in Nippon Budokan, where he and Takao won a five-team gauntlet match. Sakaguchi continued representing nWJ until September 19, when the stable, along with all other stables in DDT, was forced to disband. Sakaguchi and Takagi, however, remained aligned and formed a new stable named "Real Outsiders", replacing Soma Takao with the returning Yoshiaki Yago, also a former member of the New World Japan stable. During late 2012, Sakaguchi also formed a regular partnership with Akito, after defeating him in a singles match on October 13. On January 13, 2013, Yukio made an appearance for the LEGEND The Pro-Wrestling promotion, teaming with Riki Choshu and Tatsumi Fujinami in a six-man tag team match, where they were defeated by Hiroyoshi Tenzan, Jyushin Thunder Liger and Masahiro Chono. Post-match Liger criticized Sakaguchi, claiming that he did not belong in the same ring with the five other men as he was "only" the son of Seiji Sakaguchi. This led to DDT putting together a match for its February 17 event, where Sakaguchi and Akito were defeated by Liger and his fellow New Japan Pro-Wrestling worker Hiromu Takahashi, with Takahashi pinning Akito for the win. Afterwards, Liger requested a singles match with Sakaguchi.

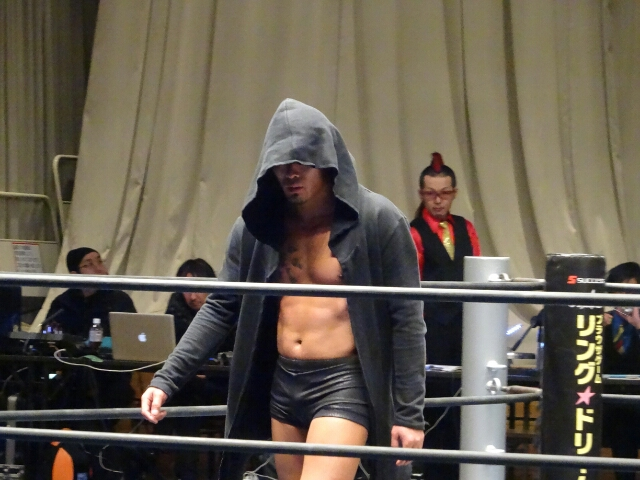
Sakaguchi in 2014

On March 20, Sakaguchi took part in the annual Right to Challenge Anytime, Anywhere Contract Battle Royal, winning the match by scoring the last elimination over Masa Takanashi and earning a shot at DDT's top title, the KO-D Openweight Championship. Following the win, Sakaguchi claimed that he had finally earned his spot in DDT. On April 13, Sakaguchi failed in his title challenge against the defending KO-D Openweight Champion Shigehiro Irie. The following day, Sakaguchi teamed with fellow mixed martial artist Hikaru Sato and defeated Fuma and Kudo in a tag team match to become the number one contenders to the KO-D Tag Team Championship. On May 3, Sakaguchi and Sato defeated Harashima and Yasu Urano to win the KO-D Tag Team Championship, Sakaguchi's first professional wrestling title. Sakaguchi and Sato made their first title defense against Monster Army members Hoshitango and Yuji Hino on June 2. Sato's and Sakaguchi's second successful title defense took place on June 14, when they defeated former champions Kudo and Yasu Urano. Post-match Sato, the de facto leader of the tag team, had mentioned that he wanted to start defending the title against younger wrestlers, and later nominated rookies Akito and Konosuke Takeshita as their next challengers. On June 23, Sato and Sakaguchi defeated Akito and Takeshita for their third successful title defense. Sakaguchi then made it to the semifinals of the annual King of DDT tournament, before losing to finalist Kenny Omega on July 7.

In mid-2013, Sakaguchi began feuding with the Monster Army stable, brought on by them stealing a gown and a statue belonging to his father Seiji. The rivalry culminated in an eight-man tag team match on August 17, during the first day of the Peter Pan weekend in Ryōgoku Kokugikan, where Sakaguchi, Akito, Kazuki Hirata and Masa Takanashi faced Monster Army members Antonio Honda, Daisuke Sasaki, Hoshitango and Yuji Hino. Sakaguchi submitted Honda for the win, following outside interference from his brother Kenji. The following day, Sakaguchi and Sato lost the KO-D Tag Team Championship to Isami Kodaka and Yuko Miyamoto. In late 2013, Sakaguchi was named the number one contender to the KO-D Openweight Championship, held by Harashima. En route to the title match, Sakaguchi submitted Harashima in a six-man tag team match on December 15 to win the Ironman Heavymetalweight Championship. On December 23, Sakaguchi failed in his KO-D Openweight Championship challenge against Harashima and, as a result, also lost the Ironman Heavymetalweight Championship back to him.

On March 2, Sakaguchi formed a new stable, later named Shuten-dōji, with Kudo and Masa Takanashi, based on the three's shared love of alcohol. On May 4, Shuten-dōji defeated Daisuke Sasaki, Kenny Omega and Kota Ibushi to win the KO-D 6-Man Tag Team Championship. They lost the title to Happy Motel (Antonio Honda, Konosuke Takeshita and Tetsuya Endo) in their second defense on July 13. Shuten-dōji, however, regained the title from Happy Motel just seven days later in a three-way match, which also included Team Drift (Keisuke Ishii, Shigehiro Irie and Soma Takao). They lost the title to Team Drift on August 17 at DDT's largest event of the year, Ryogoku Peter Pan 2014. On February 15, 2015, Shuten-dōji won the KO-D 6-Man Tag Team Championship for a record-tying third time, defeating previous champions Genpatsu Daio (Brahman Kei, Brahman Shu and Gorgeous Matsuno). Shuten-dōji then entered a series of matches with Team Drift, where the KO-D 6-Man Tag Team Championship changed hands between the two teams three times in six weeks with Shuten-dōji losing the title on March 1, winning it on March 21, and losing it again on April 11. On June 28, Sakaguchi defeated Konosuke Takeshita in the finals to win the 2015 King of DDT tournament. This led to Sakaguchi defeating stablemate Kudo on August 23 to win the KO-D Openweight Championship for the first time. He lost the title to Isami Kodaka on November 28. On December 11, 2016, Sakaguchi, Kudo and Takanashi defeated Damnation (Daisuke Sasaki, Mad Paulie and Tetsuya Endo) to win the KO-D 6-Man Tag Team Championship for the fifth time. On January 9, 2017, Sakaguchi and Masakatsu Funaki defeated Konosuke Takeshita and Mike Bailey to win the KO-D Tag Team Championship. On January 22, Sakaguchi, Kudo and Takanashi lost the KO-D 6-Man Tag Team Championship to Kazusada Higuchi, Kouki Iwasaki and Mizuki Watase in a three-way match, also involving Antonio Honda, Konosuke Takeshita and Trans-Am★Hiroshi. On April 29, Sakaguchi and Funaki lost the KO-D Tag Team Championship to Danshoku Dino and Yoshihiro Takayama in their third defense. On June 25, Sakaguchi, Kudo and Takanashi won the KO-D 6-Man Tag Team Championship for a record-tying sixth time by defeating NωA (Makoto Oishi, Mao and Shunma Katsumata). They were stripped of the title on October 10, when Kudo was sidelined with a concussion. Following Kudo's return, Shuten-dōji won the title for the seventh time by defeating All Out (Akito, Diego and Konosuke Takeshita) on December 10.

== Championships and accomplishments ==
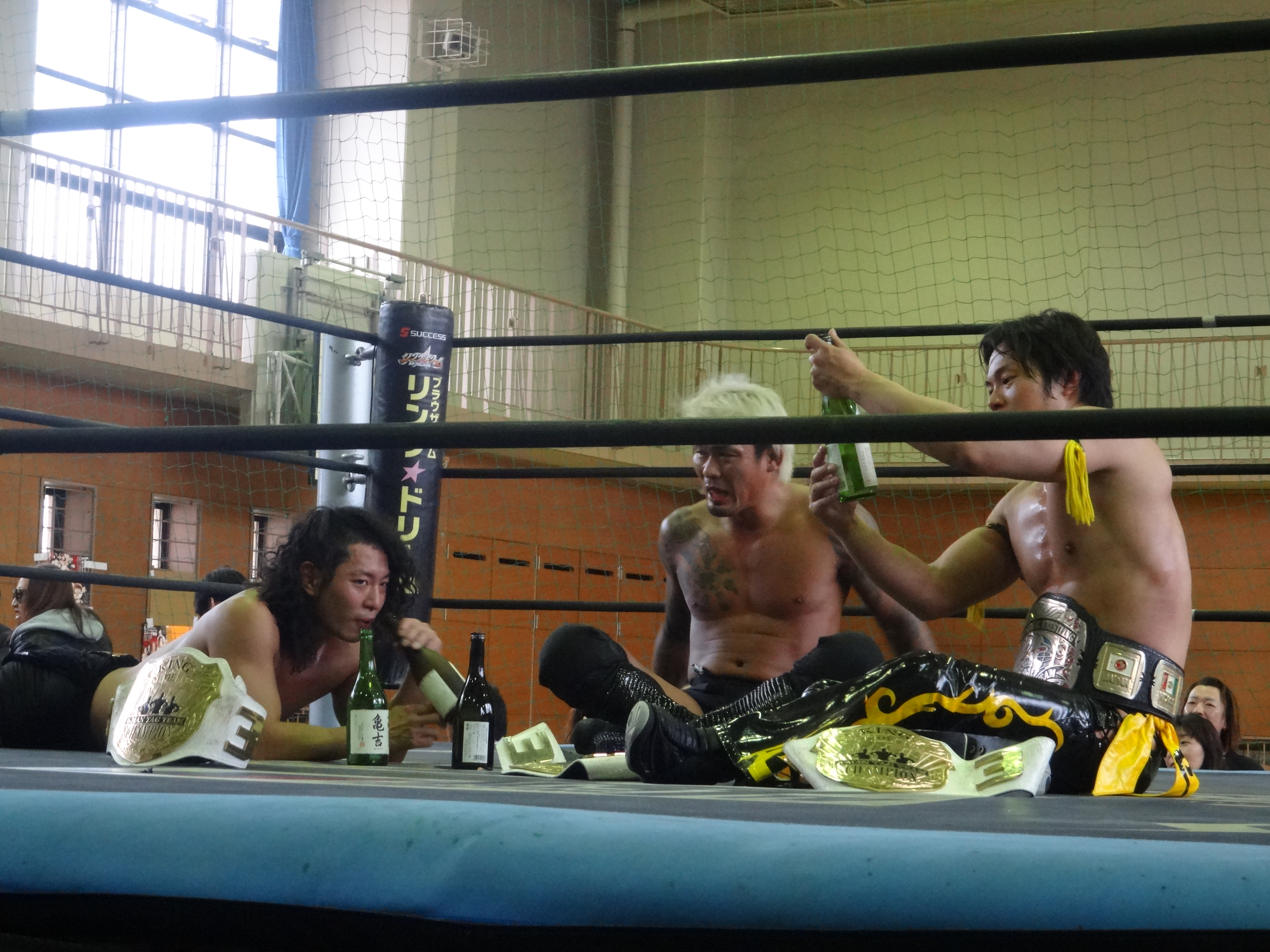
Shuten-dōji (Sakaguchi, Masa Takanashi, and Kudo) as the KO-D 6-Man Tag Team Champions in May 2014

=== Professional wrestling ===
- All Japan Pro Wrestling
  - All Asia Tag Team Championship (1 time) – with Hideki Okatani
  - AJPW TV Six-Man Tag Team Championship (1 time) – with Saki Akai and Hideki Okatani
- DDT Pro-Wrestling

- Ironman Heavymetalweight Championship (6 times)
- KO-D 6-Man Tag Team Championship (9 times) – with Kudo and Masa Takanashi/Masahiro Takanashi (7), Kazusada Higuchi and Saki Akai (1), Saki Akai and Hideki Okatani (1)
- KO-D Openweight Championship (1 time)
- KO-D Tag Team Championship (3 times) – with Hikaru Sato (1), Masakatsu Funaki (1) and Kazusada Higuchi (1)
- King of DDT Tournament (2015)
- One Night 6-Man Tag Team Tournament (2017) – with Kudo and Masahiro Takanashi
- Right to Challenge Anytime, Anywhere Contract (2013)

- Pro Wrestling Illustrated

- PWI ranked him #285 of the top 500 singles wrestlers in the PWI 500 in 2016

== Mixed martial arts record ==
Professional record breakdown
13 matches	6 wins	7 losses
By knockout	3	3
By submission	2	4
By decision	1	0

Res.	Record	Opponent	Method	Event	Date	Round	Time	Location	Notes
Loss	6–7	Takafumi Ito	Submission (armbar)	Pancrase 252: 20th Anniversary	September 29, 2013	2	1:28	Yokohama, Japan	
Win	6–6	Jin Suk Jung	Decision (unanimous)	World Victory Road Presents: Soul of Fight	December 30, 2010	2	5:00	Tokyo, Japan	Jacket Rules bout
Loss	5–6	Kotetsu Boku	KO (punch)	Shooto: Revolutionary Exchanges 3	November 23, 2009	1	1:54	Tokyo, Japan	
Win	5–5	Seung Hwa Han	Submission (rear naked choke)	Gladiator: Japan & Korea International Friendship Rally	November 3, 2009	1	N/A	Okayama, Japan	
Loss	4–5	Satoru Kitaoka	Submission (achilles lock)	Pancrase: Changing Tour 3	June 7, 2009	1	1:26	Tokyo, Japan	
Loss	4–4	Andy Ologun	KO (punches)	Fields Dynamite!! 2008	December 31, 2008	1	3:52	Saitama, Japan	
Win	4–3	Yuichi Ikari	KO (punch)	Pancrase: Shining 9	October 26, 2008	1	0:21	Tokyo, Japan	
Win	3–3	Masakazu Kuramochi	KO (soccer kick)	Pancrase: Shining 5	June 1, 2008	1	2:01	Tokyo, Japan	
Loss	2–3	Wataru Takahashi	Submission (armbar)	Pancrase: Shining 3	April 27, 2008	1	4:23	Tokyo, Japan	
Loss	2–2	Asaki Honda	Submission (heel hook)	Pancrase: Rising 8	October 14, 2007	1	0:52	Tokyo, Japan	
Win	2–1	Ki Seok Choi	Submission (rear naked choke)	Pancrase: 2007 Neo-Blood Tournament Finals	July 27, 2007	1	0:44	Tokyo, Japan	
Loss	1–1	Hyung Suk Choi	KO (punch)	Pancrase: Rising 4	April 27, 2007	1	1:51	Tokyo, Japan	
Win	1–0	Akihiro Ono	KO (knee)	Pancrase: Blow 7	September 16, 2006	2	2:47	Tokyo, Japan	
