= 2009 in Pancrase =

Mixed martial arts events

Information
- First date: February 1, 2009
- Last date: December 6, 2009

Events
- Total events: 10

Fights
- Total fights: 210
- Title fights: 10

Chronology
2008 in Pancrase	2009 in Pancrase	2010 in Pancrase

The year 2009 was the 17th year in the history of Pancrase, a mixed martial arts promotion based in Japan. In 2009 Pancrase held 10 events beginning with Pancrase: Changing Tour 1.

== Title fights ==
Title fights in 2009
Weight class				Method	Round	Time	Event	Notes
Lightweight	Katsuya Inoue (c)	def.	Daisuke Hanazawa	Decision (Unanimous)	3	5:00	Pancrase: Changing Tour 1	(Note: For the Pancrase Lightweight Championship.)
Welterweight	Takuya Wada (c)	def.	Tomoyoshi Iwamiya	Decision (Majority)	3	5:00	Pancrase: Changing Tour 2	(Note: For the Pancrase Welterweight Championship.)
Super Flyweight	Mitsuhisa Sunabe	def.	Takuya Eizumi	KO (Punch)	1	4:35	Pancrase: Changing Tour 3	(Note: For the Pancrase Super Flyweight Championship.)
Light Heavyweight	Ryo Kawamura (c)	def.	Yukiya Naito	Decision (Unanimous)	3	5:00	Pancrase: Changing Tour 3	(Note: For the Pancrase Light Heavyweight Championship.)
Middleweight	Yuki Kondo (c)	def.	Ki Bum Kim	TKO (Kick to the Body and Punches)	1	1:52	Pancrase: Changing Tour 4	(Note: For the Pancrase Middleweight Championship.)
Lightweight	Maximo Blanco	def.	Katsuya Inoue (c)	TKO (Punches)	2	4:38	Pancrase: Changing Tour 4	(Note: For the Pancrase Lightweight Championship.)
Middleweight	Yuki Kondo (c)	vs.	Yuji Hisamatsu	Draw (Unanimous)	3	5:00	Pancrase: Changing Tour 6	(Note: For the Pancrase Middleweight Championship.)
Super Flyweight	Mitsuhisa Sunabe (c)	def.	Isao Hirose	Decision (Unanimous)	3	5:00	Pancrase: Changing Tour 3	(Note: For the Pancrase Super Flyweight Championship.)
Bantamweight	Manabu Inoue (c)	def.	Masahiro Oishi	Decision (Unanimous)	3	5:00	Pancrase: Changing Tour 6	(Note: For the Pancrase Bantamweight Championship.)
Light Heavyweight	Ryo Kawamura (c)	def.	Shunsuke Inoue	Decision (Majority)	3	5:00	Pancrase: Changing Tour 8	(Note: For the Pancrase Light Heavyweight Championship.)

== Events list ==
#	Event title	Date	Arena	Location
218	Pancrase: Changing Tour 8	December 6, 2009	Differ Ariake Arena	Tokyo, Japan
217	Pancrase: Changing Tour 7	November 8, 2009	Azelea Taisho Hall	Osaka, Osaka, Japan
216	Pancrase: Changing Tour 6	October 25, 2009	Differ Ariake Arena	Tokyo, Japan
215	Pancrase: Changing Tour 5	October 17, 2009	Shinjuku Face	Tokyo, Japan
214	Pancrase: Changing Tour 4	August 8, 2009	Differ Ariake Arena	Tokyo, Japan
213	Pancrase: Pancrase Gate 2009	July 26, 2009	Gold's Gym South Tokyo Annex	Tokyo, Japan
212	Pancrase: Changing Tour 3	June 7, 2009	Differ Ariake Arena	Tokyo, Japan
211	Pancrase: Pancrase Gate 2009	May 24, 2009	Gold's Gym South Tokyo Annex	Tokyo, Japan
210	Pancrase: Changing Tour 2	April 5, 2009	Differ Ariake Arena	Tokyo, Japan
209	Pancrase: Changing Tour 1	February 1, 2009	Differ Ariake Arena	Tokyo, Japan

== Pancrase: Changing Tour 1 ==
Pancrase: Changing Tour 1 was an event held on February 1, 2009 at The Differ Ariake Arena in Tokyo, Japan.

=== Results ===
Main Card
Weight class				Method	Round	Time	Notes
Lightweight	Katsuya Inoue (c)	def.	Daisuke Hanazawa	Decision (Unanimous)	3	5:00	(Note: For the Pancrase Lightweight Championship.)
	Masanori Kanehara	def.	Kenji Arai	KO (Punches)	1	3:14
	Jameel Massouh	def.	Masaya Takita	TKO (Punches)	1	2:30
	Hiroki Aoki	def.	Takafumi Ito	Decision (Majority)	2	5:00
	Takuya Eizumi	def.	Tokuaki Ninomiya	KO (Punch)	1	1:08
	Hikaru Sato	def.	Ryuji Ohori	Submission (Heel Hook)	1	3:46
	Asaki Honda	def.	Kosei Kubota	Decision (Majority)	2	5:00
	Kiichi Kunimoto	def.	Shingo Suzuki	Technical Submission (Arm-Triangle Choke)	1	3:00
	Keigo Hirayama	def.	Shigenobu Takahashi	KO (Slam)	1	1:28
	Koji Obata	def.	Masayoshi Ichikawa	Decision (Unanimous)	1	5:00
	Takehito Noguchi	def.	Satoru Takahashi	Submission (Rear-Naked Choke)	1	4:23
	Shigeyuki Uchiyama	def.	Masakazu Takafuji	Submission (Armbar)	1	3:09
	Takumi Shimazaki	def.	Kazuki Itaya	Decision (Unanimous)	1	5:00
	Daisuke Sugishima	def.	Ben Henry	Decision (Majority)	1	5:00
	Go Yamanaka	def.	Hiroyuki Hara	Submission (Guillotine Choke)	2	0:45
	Daisuke Tsujita	def.	Keisuke Tamaru	Decision (Unanimous)	1	5:00
	Keigo Hirayama	def.	Yuichi Inafuku	Submission (Armbar)	1	4:58
	Shigenobu Takahashi	def.	Daisuke Tairaku	Submission (Triangle Choke)	1	4:05
	Koji Obata	def.	Kazuteru Miyanaga	Submission (Rear-Naked Choke)	1	1:14
	Masayoshi Ichikawa	def.	Kazuyoshi Kiyama	KO (Punches)	1	0:37
	Satoru Takahashi	def.	Yuki Terashima	Decision (Unanimous)	2	5:00
	Masakazu Takafuji	def.	Akira Omura	KO (Punch)	1	0:19
	Shigeyuki Uchiyama	def.	Tatsuro Ikehata	Submission (Guillotine Choke)	1	0:56
	Takumi Shimazaki	def.	Takatoshi Urasaki	Submission (Armbar)	1	3:50
	Kazuki Itaya	def.	Ichiro Kudo	Decision (Majority)	1	5:00
	Daisuke Sugishima	def.	Takanori Saito	Decision (Unanimous)	1	5:00
	Ben Henry	def.	Atsushi Masukura	Submission (Armbar)	1	1:06
	Hiroyuki Hara	def.	Yukitoshi Takahashi	Decision (Unanimous)	1	5:00
	Go Yamanaka	def.	Teppei Shimizu	Decision (Unanimous)	1	5:00
	Daisuke Tsujita	def.	Yoshihiro Matsunaga	Decision (Unanimous)	1	5:00

== Pancrase: Changing Tour 2 ==
Pancrase: Changing Tour 2 was an event held on April 5, 2009 at The Differ Ariake Arena in Tokyo, Japan.

=== Results ===
Main Card
Weight class				Method	Round	Time	Notes
Welterweight	Takuya Wada (c)	def.	Tomoyoshi Iwamiya	Decision (Majority)	3	5:00	(Note: For the Pancrase Welterweight Championship.)
	Maximo Blanco	vs.	Koji Oishi	Draw	2	5:00
	Takenori Sato	def.	Ichiro Kanai	Decision (Majority)	2	5:00
	Masahiro Toryu	vs.	Seiki Ryo	NC	1	4:40
	Takuya Eizumi	def.	Yuichiro Shirai	TKO (Punches)	1	1:58
	Isao Hirose	def.	Takeyasu Hirono	Decision (Unanimous)	2	5:00
	Hiroki Aoki	def.	Yuichi Ikari	TKO (Punches)	1	1:53
	Tashiro Nishiuchi	def.	Hirotoshi Saito	TKO (Punches)	2	0:58
	Shigeki Osawa	def.	Hideo Matsui	Decision (Unanimous)	2	5:00
	Hiroshi Tomita	def.	Masaru Ueda	Submission (Kimura)	1	3:06
	Shigeyuki Uchiyama	def.	Takehito Noguchi	Decision (Majority)	1	5:00
	Ranki Kawana	def.	Daisuke Endo	Decision (Unanimous)	2	5:00
	Nobuhiro Yoshitake	def.	Hayato Shimizu	Decision (Unanimous)	2	5:00
	Ryota Sasaki	def.	Shoko Sato	Decision (Split)	2	5:00
	Takumi Shimazaki	def.	Daisuke Sugishima	Decision (Majority)	1	5:00
	Kiyotaka Shimizu	def.	Toshihiro Shimizu	Submission (Rear-Naked Choke)	2	0:59
	Takuma Ishii	def.	Shinichiro Ryuno	TKO (Punches)	2	0:07
	Yuichiro Yajima	def.	Takashi Nakamura	Submission (Armbar)	1	1:46
	Daisuke Tsujita	def.	Go Yamanaka	Decision (Unanimous)	2	5:00
	Takaichi Hirayama	def.	Koji Obata	TKO (Punches)	1	3:53

== Pancrase: Pancrase Gate 2009 ==
Pancrase: Pancrase Gate 2009 was an event held on May 24, 2009 at The Gold's Gym South Tokyo Annex in Tokyo, Japan.

=== Results ===
Main Card
Weight class				Method	Round	Time	Notes
	Junichi Ota	def.	Ryosuke Togashi	Submission (Armbar)	1	2:11
	Yusuke Kawanago	def.	Ryota Masuda	Decision (Unanimous)	1	5:00
	Shinsho Anzai	def.	Jason Symak	TKO (Punches)	1	0:35
	Yuji Saeki	def.	Satoshi Watanabe	TKO (Punches)	1	3:37
	Shigeaki Kusayanagi	def.	Takashi Sato	TKO (Punches)	1	3:27
	Juntaro Ami	def.	Makoto Kawawa	Submission (Rear-Naked Choke)	1	1:34
	Ryosuke Togashi	def.	Takehiro Komiyama	Decision (Unanimous)	1	5:00
	Junichi Ota	def.	Daisuke Shimoyama	Decision (Unanimous)	1	5:00
	Ryota Masuda	def.	Tatsuro Ikehata	Decision (Unanimous)	1	5:00
	Yusuke Kawanago	def.	Masakazu Takafuji	Decision (Unanimous)	1	5:00
	Takanori Saito	def.	Ryo Saito	Submission (Guillotine Choke)	1	1:37
	Ben Henry	vs.	Kazuki Itaya	Draw	2	5:00
	Hiroyuki Nakajima	def.	Masakazu Utsugi	Submission (Rear-Naked Choke)	2	3:56
	Yoshihiro Matsunaga	def.	Hiroyuki Hara	TKO (Punches)	1	4:19
	Ryosuke Togashi	def.	Kohei Maruyama	Decision (Unanimous)	1	5:00
	Takehiro Komiyama	def.	Shigenobu Takahashi	Decision (Unanimous)	1	5:00
	Daisuke Shimoyama	def.	Ryota Sakuma	KO (Punch)	1	0:22
	Junichi Ota	def.	Tomoharu Toda	TKO (Punches)	1	3:18
	Ryota Masuda	def.	Kenichi Ogura	Decision (Unanimous)	1	5:00
	Tatsuro Ikehata	def.	Satoru Takahashi	Decision (Unanimous)	1	5:00
	Yusuke Kawanago	def.	Ryo Asami	Decision (Majority)	1	5:00
	Masakazu Takafuji	def.	Yuki Terashima	Decision (Unanimous)	1	5:00

== Pancrase: Changing Tour 3 ==
Pancrase: Changing Tour 3 was an event held on June 7, 2009 at The Differ Ariake Arena in Tokyo, Japan.

=== Results ===
Main Card
Weight class				Method	Round	Time	Notes
	Satoru Kitaoka	def.	Yukio Sakaguchi	Submission (Achilles Lock)	1	1:26
Super Flyweight	Mitsuhisa Sunabe	def.	Takuya Eizumi	KO (Punch)	1	4:35	(Note: For the Pancrase Super Flyweight Championship.)
	Koji Oishi	def.	Hyung Kwang Kim	Decision (Majority)	2	5:00
	Takenori Sato	def.	Hoon Kim	Submission (Armbar)	1	4:26
	Mu Bae Choi	def.	Katsuhisa Fujii	Decision (Unanimous)	2	5:00
	Seiya Kawahara	def.	Tatsuya So	Decision (Unanimous)	2	5:00
	Keiichiro Yamamiya	def.	Ryuji Ohori	KO (Punch)	1	1:01
	Isao Hirose	def.	Takashi Nakamura	Decision (Unanimous)	2	5:00
	Tashiro Nishiuchi	def.	Takumi Murata	Decision (Majority)	2	5:00
	Shingo Suzuki	vs.	Kosei Kubota	Draw	2	5:00
Light Heavyweight	Ryo Kawamura (c)	def.	Yukiya Naito	Decision (Unanimous)	3	5:00	(Note: For the Pancrase Light Heavyweight Championship.)
	Isao Kobayashi	def.	Koji Nakamura	KO (Punch)	2	1:03
	Hirotaka Tomiyama	def.	Keigo Hirayama	Decision (Unanimous)	2	5:00
	Yo Saito	def.	Yasutomo Tanaka	Submission (Guillotine Choke)	1	1:29
	Shigeyuki Uchiyama	def.	Hiroshi Tomita	TKO (Corner Stoppage)	1	1:27
	Nobuhiro Yoshitake	def.	Ranki Kawana	Decision (Split)	2	5:00
	Ryota Sasaki	def.	Takumi Shimazaki	Submission (Rear-Naked Choke)	1	4:23
	Kiyotaka Shimizu	def.	Takuma Ishii	Submission (Rear-Naked Choke)	1	4:00
	Yuichiro Yajima	def.	Daisuke Tsujita	Submission (Kimura)	1	2:24
	Kenji Narita	vs.	Noboru Takaiyama	Draw	2	5:00
	Koji Obata	vs.	Akihito Hara	Draw	2	5:00
	Kazuyoshi Kiyama	def.	Kensaku Nakamura	KO (Kick to the Body)	2	1:10
	Yuta Numakura	def.	Hiroki Hayashi	KO (Punch)	2	1:34

== Pancrase: Pancrase Gate 2009 ==
Pancrase: Pancrase Gate 2009 was an event held on July 26, 2009 at The Gold's Gym South Tokyo Annex in Tokyo, Japan.

=== Results ===
Main Card
Weight class				Method	Round	Time	Notes
	Shigenobu Takahashi	def.	Nobuhito Sakurada	Decision (Unanimous)	1	5:00
	Shinsho Anzai	def.	Yuji Saeki	TKO (Punches)	1	4:54
	Yoshihito Kuroki	def.	Shinji Shimamura	Submission (Kimura)	1	2:55
	Shigeaki Kusayanagi	vs.	Makoto Kawawa	Draw	2	5:00
	Tomoharu Toda	vs.	Koichi Sugai	Draw	2	5:00
	Yuta Numakura	def.	Ben Henry	TKO (Punches)	1	2:40
	Daisuke Sugishima	vs.	Kazuki Itaya	Draw	2	5:00
	Shigenobu Takahashi	def.	Ryosuke Togashi	Decision (Majority)	1	5:00
	Nobuhito Sakurada	def.	Daisuke Shimoyama	TKO (Punches)	1	0:23
	Kazuyoshi Kiyama	def.	Takehito Noguchi	Technical Decision (Split)	1	1:32
	Masakazu Takafuji	def.	Masaaki Hasegawa	Decision (Unanimous)	1	5:00
	Ryosuke Tanuma	def.	Go Yamanaka	KO (Slam)	1	1:43
	Hiroyuki Nakajima	def.	Yoshihiro Matsunaga	Submission (Triangle Choke)	1	2:21
	Atsushi Makigaya	vs.	Masakazu Utsugi	Draw	1	5:00
	Shigenobu Takahashi	def.	Koji Obata	TKO (Punches)	1	3:42
	Ryosuke Togashi	def.	Ryota Sakuma	TKO (Doctor Stoppage)	1	2:15
	Nobuhito Sakurada	def.	Akihito Hara	Decision (Majority)	1	5:00
	Daisuke Shimoyama	def.	Shu Takai	Submission (Triangle Choke)	1	2:29
	Kazuyoshi Kiyama	def.	Ryota Masuda	Decision (Majority)	1	5:00
	Takehito Noguchi	def.	Yuki Terashima	Decision (Split)	2	5:00
	Masakazu Takafuji	def.	Kenichi Ogura	Submission (Triangle Choke)	1	1:24
	Masaaki Hasegawa	def.	Ryo Asami	Decision (Unanimous)	1	5:00

== Pancrase: Changing Tour 4 ==
Pancrase: Changing Tour 4 was an event held on August 8, 2009 at The Differ Ariake Arena in Tokyo, Japan.

=== Results ===
Main Card
Weight class				Method	Round	Time	Notes
Middleweight	Yuki Kondo (c)	def.	Ki Bum Kim	TKO (Kick to the Body and Punches)	1	1:52	(Note: For the Pancrase Middleweight Championship.)
	Izuru Takeuchi	vs.	Takenori Sato	Draw	3	5:00
Lightweight	Maximo Blanco	def.	Katsuya Inoue (c)	TKO (Punches)	2	4:38	(Note: For the Pancrase Lightweight Championship.)
	Koji Oishi	def.	Felipe Olivieri	Decision (Majority)	2	5:00
	Kenji Arai	def.	Takumi Murata	Decision (Unanimous)	2	5:00
	Masahiro Toryu	vs.	Kosei Kubota	Draw	2	5:00
	Tashiro Nishiuchi	vs.	Tomonari Kanomata	Draw	2	5:00
	Eriya Matsuda	def.	Kenichi Serizawa	TKO (Soccer Kicks)	1	2:02
	Isao Kobayashi	def.	Hirotaka Tomiyama	TKO (Punches)	1	4:58
	Shigeyuki Uchiyama	def.	Yo Saito	Decision (Unanimous)	2	5:00
	Ryota Sasaki	def.	Nobuhiro Yoshitake	Decision (Unanimous)	2	5:00
	Kiyotaka Shimizu	def.	Yuichiro Yajima	Decision (Unanimous)	2	5:00
	Shingo Suzuki	def.	Asaki Honda	Submission (Rear-Naked Choke)	1	0:42
	Juntaro Ami	def.	Flavio Tanaka	Submission (Achilles Lock)	1	0:42
	Keigo Hirayama	vs.	Junichi Ota	Draw	2	5:00
	Yusuke Kawanago	def.	Hideo Matsui	KO (Flying Knee)	2	4:46
	Shoko Sato	def.	Ryo Saito	TKO (Punches)	1	1:40
	Toshihiro Shimizu	def.	Daisuke Tsujita	Submission (Rear-Naked Choke)	2	1:04

== Pancrase: Changing Tour 5 ==
Pancrase: Changing Tour 5 was an event held on October 17, 2009 at Shinjuku Face in Tokyo, Japan.

=== Results ===
Main Card
Weight class				Method	Round	Time	Notes
	Shingo Suzuki	def.	Tomoyoshi Iwamiya	TKO (Punches and Soccer Kicks)	1	2:26
	Keigo Hirayama	def.	Eriya Matsuda	KO (Punches)	1	0:20
	Shigeyuki Uchiyama	def.	Hirotoshi Saito	Decision (Unanimous)	2	5:00
	Kenji Nagai	def.	Go Sato	Technical Submission (Leg Scissor Choke)	1	1:28
	Yuichiro Yajima	def.	Hiroyuki Nakajima	Technical Submission (Armbar)	1	4:47
	Hayato Shimizu	def.	Ryo Saito	TKO (Punches)	1	4:25
	Yusuke Kawanago	def.	Motoshi Miyaji	Decision (Majority)	2	5:00
	Daisuke Endo	def.	Shoko Sato	Decision (Majority)	2	5:00
	Junichi Ota	def.	Shigenobu Takahashi	TKO (Punches)	1	2:09
	Ryosuke Tanuma	def.	Takashi Nakamura	TKO (Punches)	2	2:24
	Koji Obata	def.	Naoki Tajima	Decision (Unanimous)	1	5:00
	Takashi Ito	def.	Junro Kubota	Decision (Unanimous)	2	5:00
	Jason Symak	def.	Yuji Saeki	TKO (Punches)	1	2:33
	Kenji Narita	vs.	Yoshihito Kuroki	Draw	2	5:00
	Toru Kanamori	def.	Makoto Kawawa	Submission (Armbar)	1	1:28
	Shigeaki Kusayanagi	vs.	Juri Ohara	Draw	2	5:00
	Koji Obata	def.	Akihito Hara	TKO (Punches)	1	5:00
	Naoki Tajima	def.	Koichi Sugai	Decision (Unanimous)	2	5:00
	Takashi Ito	def.	Chuichiro Takahashi	Decision (Unanimous)	1	5:00
	Junro Kubota	def.	Yuya Nagai	KO (Punch)	1	0:07
	Takatoshi Urasaki	def.	Yuta Ito	Submission (Armbar)	1	1:38
	Masakazu Utsugi	def.	Sota Kojima	TKO (Punches)	1	1:10
	Yoshihiro Matsunaga	def.	Atsushi Makigaya	Submission (Kimura)	2	0:46
	Koji Obata	def.	Akihiro Ono	TKO (Punches)	1	4:55
	Akihito Hara	def.	Conchita Hashimoto	Decision (Unanimous)	1	5:00
	Naoki Tajima	def.	Takeshi Egami	TKO (Punches)	1	3:17
	Koichi Sugai	def.	Arata Fujimoto	Decision (Unanimous)	1	5:00
	Chuichiro Takahashi	def.	Yuki Terashima	Decision (Unanimous)	2	5:00
	Takashi Ito	def.	Norifumi Aihara	Decision (Majority)	1	5:00
	Yuya Nagai	def.	Tatsuro Ikehata	TKO (Punches)	1	0:35
	Junro Kubota	def.	Kensaku Nakamura	Decision (Split)	1	5:00

== Pancrase: Changing Tour 6 ==
Pancrase: Changing Tour 6 was an event held on October 25, 2009 at Differ Ariake Arena in Tokyo, Japan.

=== Results ===
Main Card
Weight class				Method	Round	Time	Notes
Middleweight	Yuki Kondo (c)	vs.	Yuji Hisamatsu	Draw (Unanimous)	3	5:00	(Note: For the Pancrase Middleweight Championship.)
Super Flyweight	Mitsuhisa Sunabe (c)	def.	Isao Hirose	Decision (Unanimous)	3	5:00	(Note: For the Pancrase Super Flyweight Championship.)
Bantamweight	Manabu Inoue (c)	def.	Masahiro Oishi	Decision (Unanimous)	3	5:00	(Note: For the Pancrase Bantamweight Championship.)
	Takuya Wada	vs.	Kengo Ura	Draw (Unanimous)	2	5:00
	Ichiro Kanai	def.	Tenshin Matsumoto	KO (Punch)	1	0:53
	Kenji Arai	vs.	Tomonari Kanomata	Draw (Majority)	2	5:00
	Tashiro Nishiuchi	def.	Jin Suk Jung	Submission (Arm-Triangle Choke)	2	3:39
	Shunsuke Inoue	def.	Kazuhiro Hamanaka	TKO (Punches)	1	0:52
	Seiya Kawahara	def.	Ryota Sasaki	Decision (Unanimous)	2	5:00
	Kiyotaka Shimizu	def.	Takuya Eizumi	Decision (Unanimous)	2	5:00
	Isao Kobayashi	def.	Hiroki Aoki	DQ (Groin Strike)	1	0:50
	Nobuhito Sakurada	vs.	Kenta Okuyama	Draw	2	5:00
	Yudai Aoyama	vs.	Daisuke Shimoyama	Draw	2	5:00
	Kazuyoshi Kiyama	def.	Takehito Noguchi	TKO (Punches)	2	1:05
	Masaaki Hasegawa	def.	Kenichi Ogura	TKO (Punches)	1	0:09
	Kazuki Itaya	vs.	Teppei Shimizu	Draw	2	5:00
	Yuta Numakura	def.	Masaki Kobuchi	Submission (Rear-Naked Choke)	1	1:23

== Pancrase: Changing Tour 7 ==
Pancrase: Changing Tour 7 was an event held on November 8, 2009 at Azelea Taisho Hall in Osaka, Osaka, Japan.

=== Results ===
Main Card
Weight class				Method	Round	Time	Notes
	Takafumi Ito	def.	Takahiro Kajita	Decision (Unanimous)	2	5:00
	Daisuke Hanazawa	def.	Koji Nakamura	Submission (Arm-Triangle Choke)	2	1:27
	Kiichi Kunimoto	def.	Yoshifumi Dogaki	TKO (Punches)	2	0:39
	Yu Shiori	def.	Yuta Nakamura	TKO (Punches)	1	3:24
	Soyu Tanabe	vs.	Hiroshi Tomita	Draw (Majority)	2	5:00
	Nobuhiro Yamauchi	vs.	Nobuhiro Yoshitake	Draw (Majority)	2	5:00
	Shinji Shimamura	def.	Tamotsu Kitada	Submission (Triangle Choke)	1	2:13
	Shingen Morita	def.	Masayuki Ino	DQ (Illegal Knee to the Head)	1	1:43
	Ken Ishida	def.	Daiki Nakahara	Submission (Keylock)	1	2:16
	Sho Nonaka	def.	Yuji Ogawa	TKO (Punches)	1	3:36
	Yuya Ono	def.	Hideaki Tanaka	TKO (Punches)	1	2:23

== Pancrase: Changing Tour 8 ==
Pancrase: Changing Tour 8 was an event held on December 6, 2009 at Differ Ariake Arena in Tokyo, Japan.

=== Results ===
Main Card
Weight class				Method	Round	Time	Notes
Middleweight	Ichiro Kanai	def.	Izuru Takeuchi (c)	Decision (Majority)	3	5:00	(Note: For the Pancrase Middleweight Championship.)
Light Heavyweight	Ryo Kawamura (c)	def.	Shunsuke Inoue	Decision (Majority)	3	5:00	(Note: For the Pancrase Light Heavyweight Championship.)
	Takuma Ishii	def.	Takuya Eizumi	Decision (Unanimous)	2	5:00
	Takafumi Ito	def.	Hisaki Hiraishi	Decision (Unanimous)	2	5:00
	Tomonari Kanomata	def.	Kenji Arai	Decision (Unanimous)	3	5:00
	Yuichi Ikari	def.	Keigo Hirayama	Decision (Unanimous)	2	5:00
	Hayato Shimizu	def.	Toshihiro Shimizu	Submission (Rear-Naked Choke)	1	1:06
	Junichi Ota	def.	Juntaro Ami	Submission (Armbar)	1	2:05
	Daisuke Shimoyama	def.	Naoki Tajima	Decision (Unanimous)	1	5:00
	Takashi Ito	def.	Junro Kubota	Submission (Armbar)	1	3:40
	Shoko Sato	def.	Yuta Numakura	KO (Punch)	1	0:20
	Hiroyuki Nakajima	vs.	Yoshihiro Matsunaga	Draw	2	5:00
	Naoki Tajima	def.	Akihito Hara	KO (Punch)	2	1:28
	Daisuke Shimoyama	def.	Koji Obata	Technical Submission (Triangle Choke)	1	2:28
	Junro Kubota	def.	Kazuyoshi Kiyama	KO (Punch)	1	4:43
	Takashi Ito	def.	Chuichiro Takahashi	Decision (Unanimous)	1	5:00

== See also ==
- Pancrase
- List of Pancrase champions
- List of Pancrase events
