= Daichi Kitakata =

Japanese mixed martial artist

- Born: March 30, 1991 (age 35); Kawachinagano, Japan
- Native name: 北方大地
- Nationality: Japanese
- Height: 5 ft 4 in (1.63 m)
- Weight: 114 lb (52 kg)
- Division: Flyweight (2010-2015); Strawweight (2014-present)
- Style: Judo
- Stance: Orthodox
- Fighting out of: Naniwa-ku, Osaka
- Team: P's LAB Osaka x Pancrase Inagakigumi
- Years active: 2010 - present

Mixed martial arts record
- Total: 38
- Wins: 20
- By knockout: 6
- By submission: 4
- By decision: 10
- Losses: 15
- By knockout: 4
- By submission: 2
- By decision: 9
- Draws: 1
- No contests: 2

Other information
- Mixed martial arts record from Sherdog

Daichi Kitakata (Japanese: 北方大地, Kitakata Daichi; born March 30, 1991) is a Japanese mixed martial artist, currently competing in the strawweight division of Pancrase, where he is the former Strawweight King of Pancrase.

As of January 3, 2022, he is ranked as the second best strawweight in the world by Fight Matrix. Fight Matrix furthermore ranks him as the tenth best strawweight in the history of the sport.

== Mixed martial arts career ==
=== Flyweight career ===
Kitakata made his professional debut against Yuya Ono at Pancrase - Passion Tour 2 on March 22, 2010. He won the fight by a first-round guillotine choke. During the rest of the year, Kitakata notched a technical knockout victory against Hiroyuki Nakajima and a unanimous decision loss to Hiroyuki Nakajima. Kitakata was then scheduled to participate in the 2011 Pancrase Neo Blood tournament, and faced Yuki Uejima in the quarterfinals, at Pancrase - Impressive Tour 2 on March 13, 2011. He won the fight by a third-round technical knockout. He advanced to the semifinals, held at Pancrase - Impressive Tour 5 on June 5, 2011, where he faced Yuki Yasunaga. Yasunaga won the fight by unanimous decision. Kitakata fought Shohei Takamatsu at Pancrase - Impressive Tour 12 on November 27, 2011, in his final fight of the year. He won the bout by majority decision.

Kitakata faced Yuki Nishigo at Pancrase - Progress Tour 2 on March 3, 2012. He lost the fight by majority decision. Kitakata was scheduled to face Isao Hirose at Pancrase Progress Tour 5 on April 28, 2012. He won the fight by majority decision. Kitakita next faced the debuting Yusuke Ogikubo at Pancrase Progress Tour 9 on August 5, 2012. He won the fight by a second-round technical knockout. Kitakata faced Seiji Ozuka at Pancrase Progress Tour 13 on November 25, 2012, in his fifth and final fight of the year. He won the fight by majority decision. It was the first time in his professional career that he had strung together three consecutive victories.

Kitakata faced Atsushi Yamamoto at Pancrase 246 on March 17, 2013. He lost the fight by unanimous decision. Kitakata faced Yasutaka Koga at Pancrase 249 on July 14, 2013. He lost the fight by a first-round knockout. Kitakata was scheduled to face Tatsuya So at Pancrase 253 at on November 3, 2013. He fight was ruled a unanimous decision draw.

Kitakata's winless streak extended to four consecutive fights after he lost to Yuki Yasunaga by split decision at Pancrase 258 on May 11, 2014. Kitakata snapped his winless streak at Pancrase Osaka on July 20, 2014, after beating Kohei Haruka by unanimous decision. He followed this up with a second-round submission of Kanta Sato at DEEP Cage Impact 2014 in Osaka on October 19, 2014. He finished the year with a split decision loss to Hiroyuki Abe at Pancrase Osaka on December 21, 2014.

Kitakata faced the undefeated Raymison Bruno at Pancrase 268 on July 5, 2015. The fight was ruled a no-contest after just 49 seconds, as Kitakata was unable to continue fighting due to a low blow. Kitakata was next scheduled to face Takafumi Ato at Pancrase 270 on October 4, 2015. Although Kitakata won the fight by a third-round stoppage, the fight result was overturned to a no-contest as he missed weight prior to the bout.

=== Move to strawweight ===
Following the second no-contest, Kitakta moved down to strawweight. After notching three straight victories against Tetsuo Nakanishi, Shinya Murofushi and Suguru Hayasaka, Kitakata challenged the reigning Strawweight King of Pancrase Mitsuhisa Sunabe at Pancrase 283 on December 18, 2016. Sunabe won the fight by a second-round submission.

Kitakata faced Ryo Hatta at Pancrase 286 on April 23, 2017. He won the fight by a third-round guillotine choke. Kitakata faced Hiroaki Ijima at Pancrase 296 on May 20, 2018. He won the fight by a second-round submission. Kitakata faced Tatsuya So at Pancrase 304 on April 14, 2019. He won the fight by unanimous decision.

==== Pancrase strawweight champion ====
Kitakata challenged the incumbent Strawweight King of Pancrase Mitsuhisa Sunabe for the second time at Pancrase 307 on July 21, 2019. The two previously fought at Pancrase 283 on December 18, 2016, with Sunabe winning by a second-round rear-naked choke. Kitakata was more successful in the rematch, as he won the fight by a fifth-round technical knockout.

Kitakata faced the reigning Shooto flyweight champion Yosuke Saruta at ONE Championship: Century Part Two on October 13, 2019. The bout was contested at 57 kg, which was Kitakata's first flyweight appearance since October 4, 2015. Saruta won the fight by a second-round technical knockout, stopping Kitakata with ground and pound at the 0:59 minute mark.

Kitakata was expected to make his first Pancrase strawweight title defense against Adam Antolin at Pancrase 313 on March 8, 2020. On February 10, 2020, it was announced by the promotion that Kitakata had withdrawn from the fight, as he had broken his hand in training.

Kitakata faced the former ZST flyweight champion Tatsuki Saomoto at Rizin 25 – Osaka on November 21, 2020, in his second consecutive flyweight bout. Saomoto outworked Kitakata over the three rounds and won the fight by unanimous decision.

Kitakata was sidelined for the majority of 2021, as he was diagnosed with an ossification of the posterior longitudinal ligament in April. He was furthermore diagnosed with a cervical herniated disc, at discs #5 and #6. He began treatment and rehabilitation immediately after the diagnosis, and was expected to face Yusaku Nakamura at Rizin 29 – Osaka on June 27, 2021. He was forced to withdraw from the bout however, as the doctor didn't clear him to fight during the pre-fight medical check-up.

Three months later, on September 29, 2021, it was announced that Kitakata would make his first title defense against the #1 ranked Pancrase strawweight contender Yuta Miyazawa. Kitakata's first title defense was scheduled for Pancrase 325 on December 11, 2021, two years and five months after he had won the belt. He won the fight by a third-round technical knockout. Kitakata dropped Miyazawa with a left hook, which he followed up with ground and pound which forced referee Kosuke Umeda to wave the fight off.

Kitakata returned to flyweight to face Yutaro Muramoto, at Rizin 34 on March 20, 2022. He won the fight by unanimous decision.

Kitakata was booked to make his second Pancrase title defense against the undefeated Keito Yamakita at Pancrase 328 on July 18, 2022. He lost the title by unanimous decision.

On April 1, 2023 at Rizin 41 – Osaka, Kitakata faced Makoto Takahashi and was chocked out via second round arm-triangle choke.

== Mixed martial arts record ==
Professional record breakdown
38 matches	20 wins	15 losses
By knockout	5	4
By submission	5	2
By decision	10	9
Draws	1	
No contests	2	

Res.	Record	Opponent	Method	Event	Date	Round	Time	Location	Notes
Loss	20–15–1 (2)	Jo Arai	KO (punch)	DEEP 133 Impact	September 13, 2026	1	1:42	Tokyo, Japan	Return to Strawweight.
Loss	20–14–1 (2)	Sho Sekihara	Decision (unanimous)	DEEP 126 Impact	August 17, 2025	3	5:00	Tokyo, Japan	
Loss	20–13–1 (2)	Alibek Gadzhammatov	TKO (knees and punches)	Rizin Landmark 10	November 17, 2024	1	3:20	Nagoya, Japan	
Loss	20–12–1 (2)	Makoto Takahashi	Technical Submission (arm-triangle choke)	Rizin 41	April 1, 2023	2	1:17	Osaka, Japan	
Loss	20–11–1 (2)	Keito Yamakita	Decision (unanimous)	Pancrase 328	July 18, 2022	5	5:00	Tokyo, Japan	Lost the Pancrase Strawweight Championship.
Win	20–10–1 (2)	Yutaro Muramoto	Decision (unanimous)	Rizin 34	March 20, 2022	3	5:00	Osaka, Japan	
Win	19–10–1 (2)	Yuta Miyazawa	KO (punches)	Pancrase 325	December 12, 2021	3	2:28	Tokyo, Japan	Defended the Pancrase Strawweight Championship.
Loss	18–10–1 (2)	Tatsuki Saomoto	Decision (unanimous)	Rizin 25	November 21, 2020	3	5:00	Osaka, Japan	
Loss	18–9–1 (2)	Yosuke Saruta	KO (punches)	ONE: Century – Part 2	October 13, 2019	2	0:59	Tokyo, Japan	Return to Flyweight.
Win	18–8–1 (2)	Mitsuhisa Sunabe	TKO (punches)	Pancrase 307	July 21, 2019	5	0:38	Tokyo, Japan	Won the Pancrase Strawweight Championship.
Win	17–8–1 (2)	Tatsuya So	Decision (unanimous)	Pancrase 304	April 14, 2019	3	5:00	Tokyo, Japan	
Win	16–8–1 (2)	Hiroaki Ijima	Submission (guillotine choke)	Pancrase 296	May 20, 2018	2	0:46	Tokyo, Japan	
Win	15–8–1 (2)	Daniel Lima de Carvalho	Decision (unanimous)	Pancrase 290	October 8, 2017	3	5:00	Tokyo, Japan	
Win	14–8–1 (2)	Ryo Hatta	Submission (guillotine choke)	Pancrase 286	April 23, 2017	3	4:47	Tokyo, Japan	
Loss	13–8–1 (2)	Mitsuhisa Sunabe	Submission (rear-naked choke)	Pancrase 283	December 18, 2016	2	0:48	Tokyo, Japan	For the Pancrase Strawweight Championship.
Win	13–7–1 (2)	Suguru Hayasaka	TKO (punches)	Pancrase Osaka	July 31, 2016	3	4:05	Osaka, Japan	
Win	12–7–1 (2)	Shinya Murofushi	Decision (unanimous)	Pancrase 276	March 13, 2016	3	5:00	Osaka, Japan	
Win	11–7–1 (2)	Tetsuo Nakanishi	Decision (unanimous)	Pancrase Osaka	December 23, 2015	3	5:00	Osaka, Japan	
NC	10–7–1 (2)	Takafumi Ato	NC (missed weight)	Pancrase 270	October 3, 2015	3	1:26	Tokyo, Japan	Catchweight (118.4 lb) bout; Kitakata missed weight.
NC	10–7–1 (1)	Raymison Bruno	NC (accidental groin kick)	Pancrase 268	July 5, 2015	1	0:49	Tokyo, Japan	Accidental groin kick rendered Bruno unable to continue.
Win	10–7–1	Takeshi Sato	Decision (unanimous)	DEEP Osaka Impact 2015	April 29, 2015	2	5:00	Osaka, Japan	
Loss	9–7–1	Hiroyuki Abe	Decision (split)	Pancrase Osaka	December 21, 2014	3	5:00	Osaka, Japan	
Win	9–6–1	Kanta Sato	Submission (rear-naked choke)	DEEP Cage Impact 2014 in Osaka	October 19, 2014	2	2:34	Osaka, Japan	Strawweight debut.
Win	8–6–1	Kohei Hamamoto	Decision (unanimous)	Pancrase Osaka	July 20, 2014	3	3:00	Osaka, Japan	
Loss	7–6–1	Yuki Yasunaga	Decision (split)	Pancrase 258	May 11, 2014	3	3:00	Tokyo, Japan	
Draw	7–5–1	Tatsuya So	Draw (unanimous)	Pancrase 253	November 3, 2013	3	5:00	Tokyo, Japan	
Loss	7–5	Yasutaka Koga	KO (punch)	Pancrase 249	July 14, 2013	1	4:36	Tokyo, Japan	
Loss	7–4	Atsushi Yamamoto	Decision (unanimous)	Pancrase 246	March 17, 2013	3	5:00	Tokyo, Japan	
Win	7–3	Seiji Ozuka	Decision (majority)	Pancrase Progress Tour 13	November 25, 2012	3	5:00	Tokyo, Japan	
Win	6–3	Yusuke Ogikubo	TKO (punches)	Pancrase Progress Tour 9	August 5, 2012	2	3:26	Tokyo, Japan	
Win	5–3	Isao Hirose	Decision (majority)	Pancrase Progress Tour 5	April 28, 2012	2	5:00	Tokyo, Japan	
Loss	4–3	Yuki Nishigo	Decision (majority)	Pancrase Progress Tour 2	March 3, 2012	2	5:00	Tokyo, Japan	
Win	4–2	Shohei Takamatsu	Decision (majority)	Pancrase Impressive Tour 12	November 27, 2011	2	5:00	Osaka, Japan	
Loss	3–2	Yuki Yasunaga	Decision (unanimous)	Pancrase Impressive Tour 5	June 5, 2011	2	5:00	Tokyo, Japan	Pancrase Neo Blood Flyweight Tournament Semifinal.
Win	3–1	Yuki Uejima	TKO (punches)	Pancrase Impressive Tour 2	March 13, 2011	2	3:16	Osaka, Japan	Pancrase Neo Blood Flyweight Tournament Quarterfinal.
Win	2–1	Shinobu Aoyama	TKO (punches)	Pancrase Passion Tour 12	December 19, 2010	1	4:05	Osaka, Japan	
Loss	1–1	Hiroyuki Nakajima	Decision (unanimous)	Pancrase Passion Tour 5	June 5, 2010	2	5:00	Tokyo, Japan	
Win	1–0	Yuya Ono	Submission (guillotine choke)	Pancrase Passion Tour 2	March 22, 2010	1	0:45	Osaka, Japan	Flyweight debut.

== See also ==
- List of Shooto champions
- List of male mixed martial artists
