= 2008 in Pancrase =

Mixed martial arts events

Information
- First date: January 30, 2008
- Last date: December 7, 2008

Events
- Total events: 12

Fights
- Total fights: 151
- Title fights: 7

Chronology
| 2007 in Pancrase | 2008 in Pancrase | 2009 in Pancrase |

The year 2008 was the 16th year in the history of Pancrase, a mixed martial arts promotion based in Japan. In 2008 Pancrase held 12 events beginning with Pancrase: Shining 1.

== Title fights ==
Title fights in 2008
| Weight class | | | | Method | Round | Time | Event | Notes |
|---|---|---|---|---|---|---|---|---|
| Welterweight | Katsuya Inoue | def. | Satoru Kitaoka | Decision (Split) | 3 | 5:00 | Pancrase: Shining 1 | (Note: For the Pancrase Welterweight Championship.) |
| Lightweight | Shoji Maruyama | def. | Artur Oumakhanov | KO (Head Kick and Punches) | 2 | 0:21 | Pancrase: Shining 1 | (Note: For the Pancrase Lightweight Championship.) |
| Welterweight | Takuya Wada | def. | Jason Palacios | Decision (Unanimous) | 3 | 5:00 | Pancrase: Shining 3 | (Note: For the Pancrase Welterweight Championship.) |
| Light Heavyweight | Ryo Kawamura | def. | Keiichiro Yamamiya | Decision (Unanimous) | 3 | 5:00 | Pancrase: Shining 8 | (Note: For the Pancrase Light Heavyweight Championship.) |
| Featherweight | Marlon Sandro | def. | Masaya Takita | Decision (Unanimous) | 3 | 5:00 | Pancrase: Shining 9 | (Note: For the Pancrase Featherweight Championship.) |
| Lightweight | Katsuya Inoue | def. | Koji Oishi | Decision (Unanimous) | 3 | 5:00 | Pancrase: Shining 10 | (Note: For the Pancrase Lightweight Championship.) |
| Bantamweight | Manabu Inoue | def. | Seiya Kawahara | Submission (Rear-Naked Choke) | 2 | 4:44 | Pancrase: Shining 10 | (Note: For the Pancrase Bantamweight Championship.) |

== Events list ==
| # | Event Title | Date | Arena | Location |
|---|---|---|---|---|
| 208 | Pancrase: Shining 10 | December 7, 2008 | Differ Ariake Arena | Tokyo, Japan |
| 207 | Pancrase: Shining 9 | October 26, 2008 | Differ Ariake Arena | Tokyo, Japan |
| 206 | Pancrase: Shining 8 | October 1, 2008 | Korakuen Hall | Tokyo, Japan |
| 205 | Pancrase: Shining 7 | September 7, 2008 | | Osaka, Osaka, Japan |
| 204 | Pancrase: Shining 6 | August 27, 2008 | Korakuen Hall | Tokyo, Japan |
| 203 | Pancrase: Real 2008 | June 29, 2008 | Tenkaichi Stadium | Okinawa, Japan |
| 202 | Pancrase: Shining 5 | June 1, 2008 | Korakuen Hall | Tokyo, Japan |
| 201 | Pancrase: Shining 4 | May 25, 2008 | Azelea Taisho Hall | Osaka, Osaka, Japan |
| 200 | Pancrase: Shining 3 | April 27, 2008 | Differ Ariake Arena | Tokyo, Japan |
| 199 | Pancrase: Shining 2 | March 26, 2008 | Korakuen Hall | Tokyo, Japan |
| 198 | Pancrase: 2008 Neo-Blood Tournament Eliminations | March 23, 2008 | Gold's Gym South Tokyo Annex | Tokyo, Japan |
| 197 | Pancrase: Shining 1 | January 30, 2008 | Korakuen Hall | Tokyo, Japan |

== Pancrase: Shining 1 ==
Pancrase: Shining 1 was an event held on January 30, 2008 at Korakuen Hall in Tokyo, Japan.

=== Results ===
Main Card
| Weight class | | | | Method | Round | Time | Notes |
|---|---|---|---|---|---|---|---|
| Welterweight | Katsuya Inoue | def. | Satoru Kitaoka | Decision (Split) | 3 | 5:00 | (Note: For the Pancrase Welterweight Championship.) |
| Lightweight | Shoji Maruyama | def. | Artur Oumakhanov | KO (Head Kick and Punches) | 2 | 0:21 | (Note: For the Pancrase Lightweight Championship.) |
| | Alavutdin Gadjiev | def. | Yuji Hisamatsu | TKO (Punches) | 1 | 0:41 |
| | Shinsuke Shoji | vs. | Yuichi Ikari | Draw | 3 | 5:00 |
| | Wataru Takahashi | vs. | Daisuke Hanazawa | Draw | 2 | 5:00 |
| | Tomomi Sunaba | def. | Emi Tomimatsu | TKO (Retirement) | 2 | 3:00 |
| | Sotaro Yamada | def. | Kiichi Kunimoto | Submission (Rear-Naked Choke) | 1 | 1:42 |
| | Seiya Kawahara | def. | Yuki Yamasawa | KO (Head Kick) | 1 | 0:28 |
| | Taketoshi Suzuki | def. | Akihiro Ono | KO (Punch) | 1 | 4:06 |
| | Takuya Eizumi | def. | Isao Hirose | KO (Punch) | 1 | 3:47 |

== Pancrase: 2008 Neo-Blood Tournament Eliminations ==
Pancrase: 2008 Neo-Blood Tournament Eliminations was an event held on March 23, 2008 at Gold's Gym South Tokyo Annex in Tokyo, Japan.

=== Results ===
Main Card
| Weight class | | | | Method | Round | Time | Notes |
|---|---|---|---|---|---|---|---|
| | Toshihiro Taguchi | def. | Yuki Yashima | Submission (Ankle Lock) | 1 | 1:15 |
| | Steve Magdaleno | def. | Kiyonobu Nishikata | Decision (Unanimous) | 2 | 5:00 |
| | Il Gyu Park | def. | Yuma Ishizuka | Technical Submission (Armbar) | 1 | 4:34 |
| | Motonobu Tezuka | def. | Taku Aramaki | Decision (Unanimous) | 2 | 5:00 |
| | Yasutomo Tanaka | def. | Yo Saito | Decision (Unanimous) | 2 | 5:00 |
| | Hayato Shimizu | def. | Kenwa Kanna | Decision (Split) | 2 | 5:00 |
| | Takuya Eizumi | def. | Takayuki Hirayasu | TKO (Doctor Stoppage) | 1 | 5:00 |
| | Nobuhiro Yamauchi | def. | Daisuke Endo | Decision (Unanimous) | 2 | 5:00 |
| | Isao Hirose | def. | Ranki Kawana | Submission (Rear-Naked Choke) | 2 | 4:09 |
| | Hiroki Aoki | def. | Wataru Yoshikawa | Decision (Split) | 2 | 3:00 |
| | Hirotoshi Saito | def. | Takumi Shimazaki | Decision (Majority) | 1 | 5:00 |
| | Ryota Sasaki | def. | Tomohiro Adaniya | Submission (Rear-Naked Choke) | 1 | 3:21 |
| | Hiroki Aoki | def. | Kenichi Ogura | Submission (Rear-Naked Choke) | 1 | 1:43 |
| | Wataru Yoshikawa | def. | Koji Obata | Decision (Unanimous) | 2 | 3:00 |
| | Takumi Shimazaki | def. | Takahiro Goda | Submission (Rear-Naked Choke) | 1 | 1:31 |
| | Hirotoshi Saito | def. | Junro Kubota | TKO (Punches) | 1 | 2:34 |
| | Tomohiro Adaniya | def. | Shoko Sato | Decision (Unanimous) | 1 | 5:00 |
| | Ryota Sasaki | def. | Kiyotaka Shimizu | Decision (Unanimous) | 2 | 3:00 |
| | Kenichi Ogura | def. | Yohei Sakamoto | Decision (Unanimous) | 2 | 3:00 |
| | Hiroki Aoki | def. | Akihito Hara | TKO (Punches) | 1 | 4:07 |
| | Koji Obata | def. | Arata Fujimoto | Submission (Ankle Lock) | 1 | 0:33 |
| | Wataru Yoshikawa | def. | Masashi Inoue | Decision (Unanimous) | 1 | 5:00 |
| | Takumi Shimazaki | def. | Yasushi Mikami | TKO (Punches) | 1 | 1:51 |
| | Takahiro Goda | def. | Ryo Saito | Decision (Unanimous) | 2 | 3:00 |
| | Junro Kubota | def. | Nobuhiro Yoshitake | Decision (Unanimous) | 1 | 5:00 |
| | Shoko Sato | def. | Go Matsuo | Submission (Armbar) | 1 | 2:15 |
| | Tomohiro Adaniya | def. | Manabu Watanabe | Decision (Unanimous) | 1 | 5:00 |
| | Ryota Sasaki | def. | Toshihiro Shimizu | Decision (Unanimous) | 1 | 5:00 |
| | Kiyotaka Shimizu | def. | Takuma Ishii | Submission (Rear-Naked Choke) | 1 | 1:30 |

== Pancrase: Shining 2 ==
Pancrase: Shining 2 was an event held on March 26, 2008 at Korakuen Hall in Tokyo, Japan.

=== Results ===
Main Card
| Weight class | | | | Method | Round | Time | Notes |
|---|---|---|---|---|---|---|---|
| | Marlon Sandro | def. | Miki Shida | KO (Flying Knee and Punches) | 2 | 4:19 |
| | Izuru Takeuchi | def. | Hiromitsu Kanehara | Decision (Unanimous) | 3 | 5:00 |
| | Alavutdin Gadjiev | def. | Hikaru Sato | KO (Punch from Underneath Mount) | 1 | 1:20 |
| | Takafumi Ito | vs. | Hacran Dias | Draw | 3 | 5:00 |
| | Shinsuke Shoji | def. | Kenji Arai | Decision (Unanimous) | 3 | 5:00 |
| | Michihisa Asano | def. | Yuichiro Shirai | Decision (Majority) | 2 | 5:00 |
| | Takenori Sato | vs. | Masahiro Toryu | Draw | 2 | 5:00 |
| | Tomoyoshi Iwamiya | def. | Asaki Honda | Decision (Unanimous) | 2 | 5:00 |

== Pancrase: Shining 3 ==
Pancrase: Shining 3 was an event held on April 27, 2008 at Differ Ariake Arena in Tokyo, Japan.

=== Results ===
Main Card
| Weight class | | | | Method | Round | Time | Notes |
|---|---|---|---|---|---|---|---|
| | Keiichiro Yamamiya | def. | Yuki Kondo | Decision (Majority) | 3 | 5:00 |
| | Shoji Maruyama | vs. | Koji Oishi | Draw | 3 | 5:00 |
| Welterweight | Takuya Wada | def. | Jason Palacios | Decision (Unanimous) | 3 | 5:00 | (Note: For the Pancrase Welterweight Championship.) |
| | Katsuya Inoue | vs. | Djamal Kurbanov | Draw | 3 | 5:00 |
| | Yuji Hisamatsu | def. | Matti Makela | TKO (Soccer Kick and Punches) | 1 | 4:52 |
| | Masaya Takita | def. | Manabu Inoue | KO (Knee) | 2 | 1:16 |
| | Ryuji Ohori | def. | Daisuke Watanabe | Submission (Armbar) | 2 | 4:46 |
| | Wataru Takahashi | def. | Yukio Sakaguchi | Submission (Armbar) | 1 | 4:23 |
| | Steve Magdaleno | def. | Il Gyu Park | Decision (Unanimous) | 2 | 5:00 |
| | Hirotoshi Saito | def. | Hayato Shimizu | Decision (Unanimous) | 2 | 5:00 |
| | Yasutomo Tanaka | def. | Motonobu Tezuka | Submission (Rear-Naked Choke) | 2 | 2:30 |
| | Takuya Eizumi | def. | Ryota Sasaki | TKO (Punches) | 2 | 0:43 |
| | Toshihiro Shimizu | def. | Kiyotaka Shimizu | Submission (Armbar) | 1 | 4:32 |

== Pancrase: Shining 4 ==
Pancrase: Shining 4 was an event held on May 25, 2008 at Azelea Taisho Hall in Osaka, Osaka, Japan.

=== Results ===
Main Card
| Weight class | | | | Method | Round | Time | Notes |
|---|---|---|---|---|---|---|---|
| | Daisuke Hanazawa | def. | Takafumi Hanai | Decision (Unanimous) | 2 | 5:00 |
| | Soyu Tanabe | def. | Kenji Takeshige | KO (Punch) | 1 | 3:44 |
| | Masahiro Toryu | def. | Shuji Morikawa | Submission (Guillotine Choke) | 1 | 3:36 |
| | Kenji Shimada | def. | Takashi Hasegawa | KO (Punch) | 1 | 1:58 |
| | Kiichi Kunimoto | def. | Yu Shiori | Decision (Unanimous) | 2 | 5:00 |
| | Isao Hirose | def. | Nobuhiro Yamauchi | Decision (Unanimous) | 2 | 5:00 |
| | Keiichi Funaku | def. | Hiroshi Tomita | TKO (Punches) | 1 | 0:29 |
| | Takamasa Miki | def. | Ryunosuke Yamamoto | KO (Punch) | 1 | 1:08 |
| | Yuki Uejima | def. | Akinobu Furumi | TKO (Punches) | 2 | 2:10 |
| | Shinichiro Ryuno | def. | Takuya Kibashi | TKO (Punches) | 1 | 0:44 |
| | Toshimasa Kobayashi | def. | Wataru Nakahara | Submission (Armbar) | 2 | 2:47 |

== Pancrase: Shining 5 ==
Pancrase: Shining 5 was an event held on June 1, 2008 at Korakuen Hall in Tokyo, Japan.

=== Results ===
Main Card
| Weight class | | | | Method | Round | Time | Notes |
|---|---|---|---|---|---|---|---|
| | Keiichiro Yamamiya | def. | Hiromitsu Kanehara | Decision (Unanimous) | 3 | 5:00 |
| | Izuru Takeuchi | def. | Junior Santos | Submission (Heel Hook) | 1 | 4:49 |
| | Shinsuke Shoji | def. | Takafumi Ito | TKO (Punches) | 2 | 4:01 |
| | Rafael dos Anjos | def. | Takaichi Hirayama | Submission (Armbar) | 1 | 1:25 |
| | Seiya Kawahara | def. | Masaki Yanagisawa | TKO (Punches) | 1 | 0:41 |
| | Yukio Sakaguchi | def. | Masakazu Kuramochi | KO (Soccer Kick) | 1 | 2:01 |
| | Ranki Kawana | def. | Tomoki Murayama | Submission (Armbar) | 1 | 2:17 |
| | Yuichiro Shirai | def. | Toshihiro Shimizu | Submission (Guillotine Choke) | 1 | 0:31 |
| | Yuki Yashima | vs. | Wataru Yoshikawa | Draw | 2 | 5:00 |

== Pancrase: Real 2008 ==
Pancrase: Real 2008 was an event held on June 29, 2008 at Tenkaichi Stadium in Okinawa, Japan.

=== Results ===
Main Card
| Weight class | | | | Method | Round | Time | Notes |
|---|---|---|---|---|---|---|---|
| | Mitsuhisa Sunabe | def. | Kiyotaka Shimizu | Decision (Unanimous) | 2 | 5:00 |
| | Hikaru Sato | def. | Jerry Nelson | Submission (Heel Hook) | 1 | 2:37 |
| | Hiroki Aoki | def. | Toshihiro Taguchi | TKO (Punches) | 2 | 1:17 |
| | Kiyonobu Nishikata | def. | Matt Matt | Decision (Unanimous) | 2 | 5:00 |
| | Takahiro Goda | def. | Yuji Higa | TKO (Punches) | 1 | 0:16 |
| | Takuya Iwai | def. | Mitsuru Toma | KO (Flying Knee) | 1 | 0:10 |
| | Kazuki Uechi | def. | Go Matsuo | Decision (Unanimous) | 2 | 5:00 |
| | Hiroshi Mochizuki | def. | Minoru Tsuiki | Decision (Majority) | 2 | 5:00 |

== Pancrase: Shining 6 ==
Pancrase: Shining 6 was an event held on August 27, 2008 at Korakuen Hall in Tokyo, Japan.

=== Results ===
Main Card
| Weight class | | | | Method | Round | Time | Notes |
|---|---|---|---|---|---|---|---|
| | Yuki Kondo | def. | Ryuji Ohori | KO (Soccer Kick) | 2 | 2:41 |
| | Kenji Arai | def. | Manabu Inoue | Decision (Unanimous) | 3 | 5:00 |
| | Seiya Kawahara | def. | Kentaro Imaizumi | TKO (Doctor Stoppage) | 1 | 2:09 |
| | Yuichi Ikari | def. | Eriya Matsuda | TKO (Doctor Stoppage) | 2 | 4:09 |
| | Masahiro Toryu | def. | Tomoyoshi Iwamiya | Decision (Majority) | 2 | 5:00 |
| | Maximo Blanco | vs. | Yuki Yashima | NC (Accidental Headbutt) | 1 | 0:56 |
| | Steve Magdaleno | def. | Hiroki Aoki | TKO (Punches) | 1 | 4:47 |
| | Hirotoshi Saito | def. | Yasutomo Tanaka | Decision (Unanimous) | 2 | 5:00 |
| | Isao Hirose | def. | Takuya Eizumi | Decision (Unanimous) | 2 | 5:00 |
| | Shingo Suzuki | def. | Kenji Narita | Submission (Armbar) | 2 | 3:56 |
| | Shigetomo Takahashi | def. | Yuichi Inafuku | Submission (Armbar) | 1 | 4:33 |
| | Shunichi Shimizu | def. | Junro Kubota | Submission (Triangle Choke) | 1 | 2:37 |
| | Takuma Ishii | def. | Tomohiro Adaniya | Submission (Rear-Naked Choke) | 2 | 2:37 |

== Pancrase: Shining 7 ==
Pancrase: Shining 7 was an event held on September 7, 2008 in Osaka, Osaka, Japan.

=== Results ===
Main Card
| Weight class | | | | Method | Round | Time | Notes |
|---|---|---|---|---|---|---|---|
| | Daichi Fujiwara | def. | Nobuhiro Yamauchi | Decision (Unanimous) | 2 | 5:00 |
| | Daisuke Hanazawa | def. | Leandro Kusano | Submission (Arm-Triangle Choke) | 1 | 3:52 |
| | Kiichi Kunimoto | vs. | Hirotaka Yoshioka | NC (Yoshioka Cut by Accidental Headbutt) | 1 | 2:10 |
| | Kenji Takeshige | vs. | Motonobu Tezuka | Draw | 2 | 5:00 |
| | Yu Shiori | def. | Hiroto Horai | Decision (Majority) | 2 | 5:00 |
| | Takahiro Goda | def. | Takashi Hasegawa | Decision (Unanimous) | 2 | 5:00 |
| | Takayuki Hirayasu | def. | Shinichiro Ryuno | Submission (Punches) | 1 | 3:44 |
| | Toru Harai | def. | Hideo Matsui | TKO (Punches) | 2 | 2:21 |
| | Koji Nakamura | def. | Yoichi Kosumi | TKO (Punches) | 1 | 2:54 |
| | Hiroshi Tomita | def. | Keiichi Kosen | Technical Submission (Armbar) | 1 | 2:48 |
| | Takamasa Miki | def. | Kansei Nishida | TKO (Punches) | 1 | 3:26 |
| | Masao Fujii | def. | Kojima Man | Submission (Armbar) | 1 | 4:55 |
| | Daiki Nakahara | def. | Yuya Ono | Submission (Triangle Choke) | 1 | 3:10 |

== Pancrase: Shining 8 ==
Pancrase: Shining 8 was an event held on October 1, 2008 at Korakuen Hall in Tokyo, Japan.

=== Results ===
Main Card
| Weight class | | | | Method | Round | Time | Notes |
|---|---|---|---|---|---|---|---|
| Light Heavyweight | Ryo Kawamura | def. | Keiichiro Yamamiya | Decision (Unanimous) | 3 | 5:00 | (Note: For the Pancrase Light Heavyweight Championship.) |
| | Koji Oishi | def. | Naoyuki Kotani | Decision (Unanimous) | 3 | 5:00 |
| | Ichiro Kanai | def. | Hiromitsu Kanehara | Decision (Unanimous) | 2 | 5:00 |
| | Takenori Sato | def. | Yuji Hisamatsu | Decision (Unanimous) | 2 | 5:00 |
| | Yuichiro Shirai | vs. | Ranki Kawana | Draw | 2 | 5:00 |
| | Maximo Blanco | def. | Hiroki Aoki | TKO (Slam and Punches) | 1 | 0:22 |
| | Yasutomo Tanaka | vs. | Hayato Shimizu | Draw | 2 | 5:00 |
| | Kiyotaka Shimizu | vs. | Takuma Ishii | Draw | 2 | 5:00 |
| | Isao Kobayashi | vs. | Shigeaki Kusayanagi | Draw | 2 | 5:00 |
| | Masaru Ueda | def. | Shoko Sato | TKO (Doctor Stoppage) | 1 | 2:30 |

== Pancrase: Shining 9 ==
Pancrase: Shining 9 was an event held on October 26, 2008 at Differ Ariake Arena in Tokyo, Japan.

=== Results ===
Main Card
| Weight class | | | | Method | Round | Time | Notes |
|---|---|---|---|---|---|---|---|
| Featherweight | Marlon Sandro | def. | Masaya Takita | Decision (Unanimous) | 3 | 5:00 | (Note: For the Pancrase Featherweight Championship.) |
| | Kenji Arai | vs. | Tashiro Nishiuchi | Draw | 3 | 5:00 |
| | Takuya Wada | vs. | Masahiro Toryu | Draw | 2 | 5:00 |
| | Yukio Sakaguchi | def. | Yuichi Ikari | KO (Punch) | 1 | 0:21 |
| | Takafumi Ito | def. | Takaichi Hirayama | Decision (Unanimous) | 2 | 5:00 |
| | Hiroyuki Nozawa | def. | Asaki Honda | Decision (Unanimous) | 2 | 5:00 |
| | Tomoyoshi Iwamiya | def. | Kiichi Kunimoto | Decision (Unanimous) | 2 | 5:00 |
| | Takuya Eizumi | def. | Takayuki Hirayasu | TKO (Doctor Stoppage) | 2 | 1:55 |
| | Hiroshi Tomita | vs. | Wataru Takahashi | Draw | 2 | 5:00 |
| | Shigenobu Takahashi | vs. | Wataru Yoshikawa | Draw | 2 | 5:00 |

== Pancrase: Shining 10 ==
Pancrase: Shining 10 was an event held on December 7, 2008 at Differ Ariake Arena in Tokyo, Japan.

=== Results ===
Main Card
| Weight class | | | | Method | Round | Time | Notes |
|---|---|---|---|---|---|---|---|
| Lightweight | Katsuya Inoue | def. | Koji Oishi | Decision (Unanimous) | 3 | 5:00 | (Note: For the Pancrase Lightweight Championship.) |
| Bantamweight | Manabu Inoue | def. | Seiya Kawahara | Submission (Rear-Naked Choke) | 2 | 4:44 | (Note: For the Pancrase Bantamweight Championship.) |
| | Takuya Wada | def. | Masahiro Toryu | Decision (Unanimous) | 3 | 5:00 |
| | Ichiro Kanai | def. | Daijiro Matsui | Technical Submission (Arm-Triangle Choke) | 1 | 2:25 |
| | Rin Nakai | def. | Tomomi Sunaba | TKO (Punches) | 1 | 1:33 |
| | Tomoyoshi Iwamiya | def. | Hiroyuki Nozawa | Decision (Unanimous) | 3 | 5:00 |
| | Stanislav Nedkov | def. | Masayuki Kono | TKO (Punches) | 1 | 1:35 |
| | Hirotoshi Saito | vs. | Tashiro Nishiuchi | Draw | 2 | 5:00 |
| | Daisuke Hanazawa | def. | Maximo Blanco | Submission (Arm-Triangle Choke) | 2 | 2:19 |
| | Isao Hirose | def. | Tokuaki Ninomiya | Decision (Majority) | 2 | 5:00 |
| | Shingo Suzuki | def. | Makoto Kawawa | Submission (Armbar) | 1 | 1:13 |
| | Isao Kobayashi | vs. | Yuki Tokushige | Draw | 2 | 5:00 |
| | Tatsuro Ikehata | def. | Takanori Iwamoto | Submission (Armbar) | 2 | 2:00 |
| | Masaru Ueda | def. | Takumi Shimazaki | TKO (Punches) | 1 | 0:28 |
| | Masakazu Takafuji | def. | Takeshi Egami | Submission (Armbar) | 1 | 2:12 |
| | Hiroyuki Nakajima | def. | Takanori Saito | Submission (Triangle Choke) | 1 | 3:47 |
| | Takashi Nakamura | def. | Go Yamanaka | KO (Punch) | 2 | 3:53 |

== See also ==
- Pancrase
- List of Pancrase champions
- List of Pancrase events
