= Kozo Urita =

Japanese mixed martial arts fighter

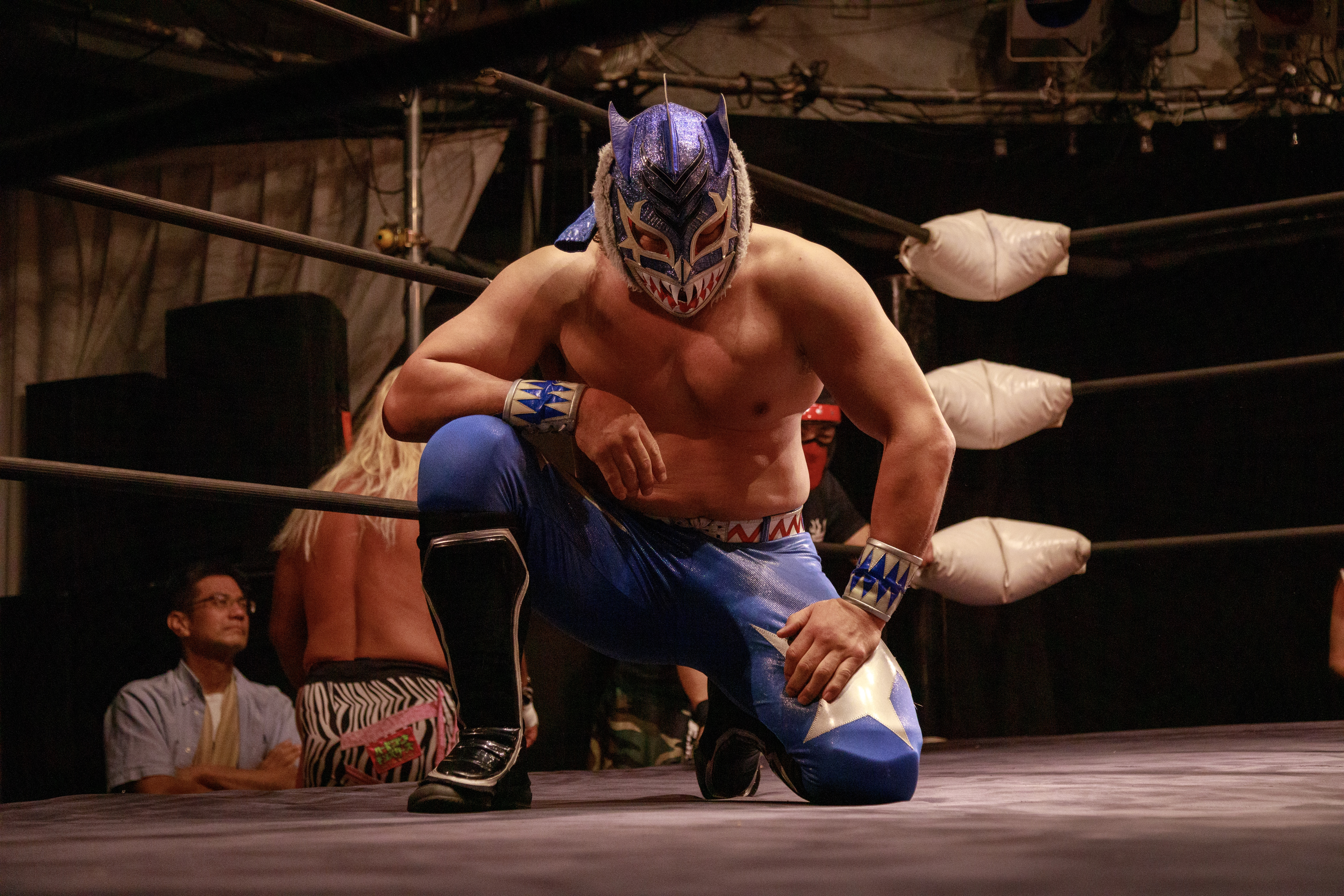
- Born: October 30, 1974 (age 51); Yokohama, Kanagawa, Japan
- Other names: Tiger Shark; Blue Shark
- Nationality: Japanese
- Height: 1.74 m (5 ft 9 in)
- Weight: 85 kg (187 lb; 13.4 st)
- Division: Light heavyweight Middleweight
- Style: Boxing
- Team: Seikendo; Urita Dojo
- Teachers: Satoru Sayama; Hidetada Irie
- Years active: 2003–present

Mixed martial arts record
- Total: 41
- Wins: 17
- By knockout: 8
- By submission: 4
- By decision: 5
- Losses: 21
- By knockout: 5
- By submission: 4
- By decision: 12
- Draws: 2
- No contests: 1

Other information
- Mixed martial arts record from Sherdog

Kozo Urita (瓜田 幸造, Urita Kōzō; born October 30, 1974) is a Japanese mixed martial artist and professional wrestler. He was associated with Real Japan Pro Wrestling's Seikendo team.

Urita wrestled more famously under the name of Tiger Shark, and worked in promotions like Battlarts, Dradition Pro Wrestling, Tenryu Project and Riki Choshu's Legend The Pro Wrestling. Currently, he wrestles in Kazuki Okubo's Ganko Pro Wrestling and other independent promotions as Blue Shark.

== Career ==
=== Early career ===
After several years training judo, Urita joined mixed martial arts organization Kingdom Ehrgeiz, where he was put under Hidetada Irie. Later, he moved to Satoru Sayama's Seikendo promotion, and in 2003 he had his MMA debut, submitting David Davitashvili. Thanks to a work agreement between Seikendo and Pancrase, Urita went to compete in the latter, fighting Keiichiro Yamamiya and Izuru Takeuchi to decision and knocking out Riki Fukuda. He also competed in a seikendo-rules MMA tournament in Sayama's Real Japan Pro Wrestling, winning the contest after three matches.

=== Real Japan Pro Wrestling (2005–2013) ===
In 2005, Urita started doing professional wrestling for Real Japan Pro Wrestling. He received the gimmick of Tiger Shark, a masked character with heel mannerisms conceived as Super Tiger II's dark counterpart, in a similar way to the historical Black Tiger and Tiger Mask. Tiger Shark wrestled under a blue mask with a shark design, contrasting with Super Tiger's silver and purple Tiger Mask attire, and had his first match teaming up with Masao Orihara against him and Hi69. Tiger Shark and Super Tiger wrestled each other in tag team matches during the next events, with Urita often teaming up with Orihara. However, he ended settling down in a tag team with Black Shadow, a similar character played by Makoto "Max" Miyazawa. They feuded with a coalition composed by Gran Hamada, Sammy Lee, Jr. and Kendo Nagasaki, as well as All Japan Pro Wrestling's Minoru.

In 2010, Shark broke his alliance with Masao Orihara, wrestling in a match in which Urita was defeated. After seldom apparitions in RJPW, Tiger Shark teamed again with Black Shadow to win the vacant RJPW Tag Team Championship, defeating Yujiro Yamamoto and Yuki Ishikawa. However, they had no defenses of the title, and they spent the next years feuding with Orihara. He also had a high-level match against New Japan Pro-Wrestling's Tiger Mask IV, being beaten. In September 2013, Tiger Shark had his last apparition in RJPW, teaming up with Tatsumi Fujinami to get a win over Super Tiger II and Riki Choshu.

=== Battlarts (2009–2011) ===
Tiger Shark started wrestling for shoot-style promotion Battlarts in 2009 as a RJPW representative. He participated in the B1 Climax 2009 Block A, facing star Yuki Ishikawa and Yuta Yoshikawa in losing efforts, though getting victories over Keita Yano and Ryuji Walter. As a result, he did not qualify. He continued appearing in Battlarts, teaming up with his long time rival Super Tiger II in a special tag team to feud with Ishikawa, as well as Bison Tagai. In 2010, the team broke up and Shark went free, staying with the promotion until its demise in 2011.

=== Tenryu Project and Legend The Pro Wrestling (2010–2013) ===
Always working as a RJPW representative, Tiger Shark had his debut in Tenryu Project with his biggest career win, beating Dragon Gate top player Masaaki Mochizuki to win the Tenryu Project International Junior Heavyweight Championship. He retained it successfully against Hiroki, Dokuroman and Hikaru Sato, until he dropped it to Hiroki in a rematch. Around that time, Tiger moved to Riki Choshu's Legend The Pro Wrestling, where he teamed with a variety of Tiger-related characters, among them Super Tiger II, Original Tiger Mask and Black Tiger V. He also wrestled alongside Yoshiaki Fujiwara. In 2013, Tiger Shark and his allies entered in a feud with Atsushi Onita and his entourage, as part of the enmity between Onita and Original Tiger Mask from RJPW. Shark faced personally Onita's henchman Ichiro Yaguchi, with Urita coming victorious in a single match, his last apparition in the promotion.

== Championships and accomplishments ==
- Pro Wrestling A-Team
  - WEW World Tag Team Championship (1 time) – with Daisaku Shimoda
- Real Japan Pro Wrestling
  - RJPW Tag Team Championship (1 time, inaugural, last) – with Black Shadow
  - RJPW vs. U-File Tournament (2012)
- Tenryu Project
  - Tenryu Project International Junior Heavyweight Championship (1 time)
- Independent circuit
  - Latin American Championship (1 time)
  - UWA Intercontinental Tag Team Championship (1 time) – with Takahiro Tababa

== Mixed martial arts record ==
Professional record breakdown
41 matches	17 wins	21 losses
By knockout	8	5
By submission	4	4
By decision	5	12
Draws	2	
No contests	1	

Res.	Record	Opponent	Method	Event	Date	Round	Time	Location	Notes
Loss	17-21-2 (1)	Shuto Masui	Submission (kimura)	Fighting Nexus - Vol. 43	March 8, 2026	2	3:42	Tokyo, Japan	Light Heavyweight debut.
Loss	17-20-2 (1)	Yuji Inoue	KO (punch)	Grachan 79	December 21, 2025	1	2:43	Tokyo, Japan	Return to Heavyweight.
Loss	17-19-2 (1)	Joilton Lutterbach	KO (head kick)	Roots of Martial Arts Network 3	October 11, 2025	1	3:01	Tokyo, Japan	Catchweight (88 kg), Full Gi bout.
Win	17-18-2 (1)	Kenichi Nakayama	TKO (submission to punches)	Roots of Martial Arts Network 2	April 27, 2025	1	2:22	Tokyo, Japan	Catchweight (94 kg), Full Gi bout.
Loss	16-18-2 (1)	Ryutaro Sato	KO (punch)	Fighting Nexus - Vol. 36	August 25, 2024	1	1:10	Tokyo, Japan	
Win	16-17-2 (1)	Tesshin Isobe	Decision (split)	Fighting Nexus - Vol. 35	May 12, 2024	3	5:00	Tokyo, Japan	Middleweight debut.
Loss	15-17-2 (1)	Radek Hecl	KO (punch)	Grachan 66	December 17, 2023	1	4:34	Tokyo, Japan	
Loss	15-16-2 (1)	Hon Hsing	Decision (majority)	Grachan 63	August 6, 2023	2	5:00	Tokyo, Japan	
Loss	15-15-2 (1)	Brandon Hashimoto	Decision (unanimous)	Grachan 58	December 4, 2022	2	5:00	Chiba, Japan	Grachan Openweight Tournament First Round.
Win	15-14-2 (1)	Katsuyoshi Sasaki	TKO (doctor stoppage)	Grachan 57	September 4, 2022	2	5:00	Chiba, Japan	
Loss	14-14-2 (1)	Hidetaka Arato	Decision (unanimous)	Grachan 55	May 15, 2022	2	5:00	Tokyo, Japan	
Loss	14-13-2 (1)	Yusuke Kawaguchi	Decision (unanimous)	Grachan 25 / BFC Vol.2	October 10, 2016	2	5:00	Tokyo, Japan	
Win	14-12-2 (1)	Gennadiy Kovalev	KO (punch)	FEFoMP: International Modern Pankration Championship	April 29, 2012	1	3:35	Vladivostok, Russia	
Win	13-12-2 (1)	Gadji Zaipulaev	Decision (unanimous)	FEFoMP: Impact League 4	October 16, 2010	3	5:00	Khabarovsk, Russia	
Win	12-12-2 (1)	Barry Guerin	TKO (doctor stoppage)	Square Jungle: Advent of Mr. MMA	September 13, 2009	1	0:49	Tokyo, Japan	
Win	11-12-2 (1)	Sharihyar Abbasov	TKO (doctor stoppage)	GCM: Cage Force 11	June 27, 2009	2	1:11	Tokyo, Japan	
Loss	10-12-2 (1)	Jerry Nelson	Decision (majority)	Tenkaichi Fight 37	May 17, 2009	3	5:00	Chatan, Japan	
Loss	10-11-2 (1)	Ryuta Sakurai	Submission (armbar)	Deep: 37 Impact	August 17, 2008	1	3:22	Tokyo, Japan	
Loss	10-10-2 (1)	Vladimir Yushko	Decision (unanimous)	FEFoMP: World Pankration Championship 2008	May 24, 2008	2	5:00	Khabarovsk, Russia	
Win	10-9-2 (1)	Hoon Kim	TKO (punches)	MARS 11: 2nd Anniversary	February 11, 2008	2	1:41	Tokyo, Japan	
Loss	9-9-2 (1)	Yuya Shirai	Submission (armbar)	Deep: 31 Impact	August 5, 2007	1	2:42	Tokyo, Japan	
Loss	9-8-2 (1)	Ichiro Kanai	TKO (punches)	Pancrase: Rising 5	May 30, 2007	1	3:50	Tokyo, Japan	
N/C	9-7-2 (1)	Hoon Kim	No contest (accidental low blow)	MARS 7: Tornado Returns	April 15, 2007	1	0:00	Tokyo, Japan	
Win	9-7-2	Alavutdin Gadjiev	Decision (unanimous)	FEFoMP: Asian Pankration Championship 2006	December 6, 2006	2	5:00	Khabarovsk, Russia	
Win	9-6-2	Rikuhei Fujii	Decision (unanimous)	Pancrase: Blow 9	October 25, 2006	2	5:00	Tokyo, Japan	
Loss	8-6-2	Marcelo Brito	Submission (rear naked choke)	MARS 4: New Deal	August 27, 2006	1	4:44	Tokyo, Japan	
Loss	8-5-2	Hidemi Mihara	Decision (unanimous)	MARS: MARS Attack 1	July 21, 2006	2	5:00	Tokyo, Japan	
Win	8-4-2	Ken Ogawa	TKO (corner stoppage)	MARS: MARS Attack 1	July 21, 2006	1	1:43	Tokyo, Japan	
Loss	7-4-2	Arman Gambaryan	Decision (unanimous)	FEFoMP: World Pankration Championship 2006	May 20, 2006	3	2:00	Khabarovsk, Russia	
Draw	7-3-2	Yuichi Nakanishi	Draw	Pancrase: Blow 3	April 9, 2006	2	5:00	Tokyo, Japan	
Win	7-3-1	Riki Fukuda	KO (punch)	Pancrase: Blow 1	January 27, 2006	1	0:40	Tokyo, Japan	
Win	6-3-1	Yuta Nakamura	Decision (unanimous)	RJPW: Legend Championship	December 16, 2005	3	5:00	Tokyo, Japan	
Win	5-3-1	Toshihiro Hosoe	Submission (armbar)	RJPW: Legend Championship	December 16, 2005	1	3:30	Tokyo, Japan	
Win	4-3-1	Motohiro Tachihara	Submission (armbar)	RJPW: Legend Championship	December 16, 2005	1	3:36	Tokyo, Japan	
Loss	3-3-1	Izuru Takeuchi	Decision (unanimous)	Pancrase: Spiral 9	November 4, 2005	2	5:00	Tokyo, Japan	
Win	3-2-1	Moriyuki Yamada	Submission (guillotine choke)	Pancrase: 2005 Neo-Blood Tournament Finals	August 27, 2005	2	3:37	Tokyo, Japan	
Draw	2-2-1	Yuta Nakamura	Draw	RJPW: Roman Martial Arts 2005	July 18, 2005	2	5:00	Sendai, Miyagi, Japan	
Loss	2-2	Valery Pliev	Decision (unanimous)	FEFoMP: Mayor Cup 2005	April 30, 2005	3	5:00	Khabarovsk, Russia	
Win	2-1	Jin O Kim	Decision (unanimous)	Gladiator FC: Day 1	June 26, 2004	3	5:00	Seoul, South Korea	
Loss	1-1	Keiichiro Yamamiya	Decision (unanimous)	Pancrase: Brave 5	May 28, 2004	2	5:00	Tokyo, Japan	
Win	1-0	David Davitashvili	Submission (guillotine choke)	Seikendo: Dream Challenge	May 31, 2003	2	3:18	Tokyo, Japan	
