= Takuya Wada (mixed martial artist) =

Japanese mixed martial arts fighter and wrestler

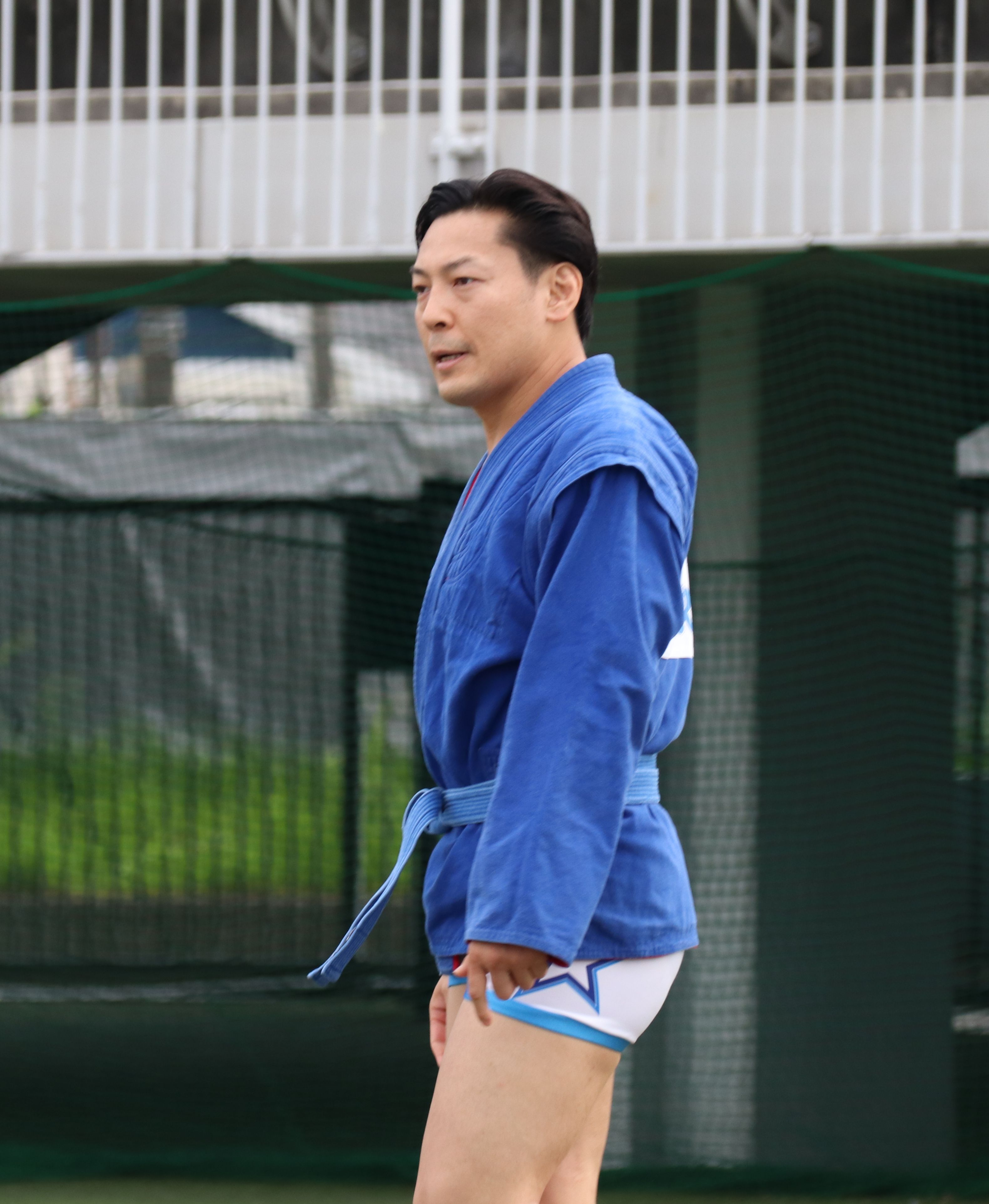
- Wada in August 2022
- Born: February 14, 1978 (age 48); Tokyo, Japan
- Nationality: Japanese
- Height: 5 ft 7 in (1.70 m)
- Weight: 169 lb (77 kg; 12.1 st)
- Division: Middleweight; Welterweight
- Style: Sambo; Brazilian jiu-jitsu Shoot wrestling
- Stance: Orthodox
- Fighting out of: Japan
- Team: SK Absolute
- Years active: 1999 - 2010

Mixed martial arts record
- Total: 41
- Wins: 21
- By knockout: 2
- By submission: 5
- By decision: 14
- Losses: 9
- By knockout: 1
- By submission: 5
- By decision: 3
- Draws: 10
- No contests: 1

Other information
- Mixed martial arts record from Sherdog

Takuya Wada (和田 拓也, Wada Takuya; born February 14, 1978) is a Japanese mixed martial artist and professional wrestler. He competed in the Welterweight and Middleweight divisions.

== Career ==
=== Mixed martial arts ===
Wada is a disciple of Kazuhiro Kusayanagi and Tenshin Matsumoto at Shooto Gym K'z Factory. He debuted in 1999 for Shooto before moving to Pancrase in 2002.

Wada became the interim Welterweight King of Pancrase in 2008, defeating Jason Palacios.

=== Professional wrestling ===
His professional wrestling career began in 2015 for former Dramatic Dream Team sister promotion Hard Hit, facing Hikaru Sato. He is a mainstay of the Hard Hit promotion.

Wada embarked on a tour with All Japan Pro Wrestling throughout 2016 to 2017 and 2019, teaming with Atsushi Aoki, Yuya Aoki and Ultimo Dragon. He continues to have sporadic appearances, often appearing in tag matches with Hikaru Sato as of recently August 2021.

In December 2020, he made it to the finals of the Hard Hit King of Hard Hit tournament defeating Hideki "Shrek" Sekine.

== Mixed martial arts record ==
Professional record breakdown
| 41 matches | 21 wins | 9 losses |
| By knockout | 2 | 1 |
| By submission | 5 | 5 |
| By decision | 14 | 3 |
| Draws | 10 | |
| No contests | 1 | |

| Res. | Record | Opponent | Method | Event | Date | Round | Time | Location | Notes |
|---|---|---|---|---|---|---|---|---|---|
| Win | 21–9–10 (1) | Minoru Tanaka | TKO (punches and elbows) | Gleat MMA Ver.0 | December 14, 2022 | 1 | 1:37 | Tokyo, Japan | Openweight bout. |
| Loss | 20–9–10 (1) | Keita Nakamura | TKO (submission to punches) | SRC: Sengoku Raiden Championship 15 | October 30, 2010 | 1 | 3:30 | Tokyo, Japan | |
| Win | 20–8–10 (1) | Jae Sun Lee | Decision (Split) | SRC: Sengoku Raiden Championship 13 | June 20, 2010 | 3 | 5:00 | Tokyo, Japan | |
| Win | 19–8–10 (1) | Shiko Yamashita | Submission (Rear-Naked Choke) | Shooto: Revolutionary Exchanges 3 | November 23, 2009 | 3 | 4:26 | Tokyo, Japan | |
| Draw | 18–8–10 (1) | Kengo Ura | Draw (Unanimous) | Pancrase: Changing Tour 6 | October 25, 2009 | 2 | 5:00 | Tokyo, Japan | |
| Win | 18–8–9 (1) | Tomoyoshi Iwamiya | Decision (Majority) | Pancrase: Changing Tour 2 | April 5, 2009 | 3 | 5:00 | Tokyo, Japan | Defended the Pancrase Welterweight Championship. |
| Win | 17–8–9 (1) | Masahiro Toryu | Decision (Unanimous) | Pancrase: Shining 10 | December 7, 2008 | 3 | 5:00 | Tokyo, Japan | |
| Draw | 16–8–9 (1) | Masahiro Toryu | Draw | Pancrase: Shining 9 | October 26, 2008 | 2 | 5:00 | Tokyo, Japan | |
| Win | 16–8–8 (1) | Jason Palacios | Decision (Unanimous) | Pancrase: Shining 3 | April 27, 2008 | 3 | 5:00 | Tokyo, Japan | Won the interim Pancrase Welterweight Championship. Later promoted to undisputed champion. |
| Win | 15–8–8 (1) | Seiki Ryo | Decision (Unanimous) | Pancrase: Rising 9 | November 28, 2007 | 2 | 5:00 | Tokyo, Japan | |
| NC | 14–8–8 (1) | Hyung Kwang Kim | No Contest | Pancrase: Rising 8 | October 14, 2007 | 2 | 1:40 | Tokyo, Japan | |
| Win | 14–8–8 | Sotaro Yamada | Decision (Unanimous) | Pancrase: Rising 4 | April 27, 2007 | 2 | 5:00 | Tokyo, Japan | |
| Loss | 13–8–8 | Stephen Haigh | Submission (Rear-Naked Choke) | Bodog Fight: Costa Rica Combat | February 17, 2007 | 3 | 1:37 | Costa Rica | |
| Win | 13–7–8 | Tadasuke Yoshida | Submission (Rear-Naked Choke) | Pancrase: Blow 10 | December 2, 2006 | 1 | 4:22 | Tokyo, Japan | |
| Loss | 12–7–8 | Carlos Condit | Submission (Kimura) | Pancrase: Blow 7 | September 16, 2006 | 3 | 4:22 | Tokyo, Japan | |
| Draw | 12–6–8 | Shinsuke Shoji | Draw | Pancrase: Blow 3 | April 9, 2006 | 2 | 5:00 | Tokyo, Japan | |
| Loss | 12–6–7 | Kuniyoshi Hironaka | Submission (Triangle Choke) | GCM: D.O.G. 4 | December 11, 2005 | 1 | 4:29 | Tokyo, Japan | |
| Win | 12–5–7 | Masakazu Kuramochi | Decision (Unanimous) | Pancrase: 2005 Neo-Blood Tournament Finals | August 27, 2005 | 2 | 5:00 | Tokyo, Japan | |
| Draw | 11–5–7 | Yuji Hoshino | Draw | GCM: D.O.G. 2 | June 11, 2005 | 2 | 5:00 | Tokyo, Japan | |
| Draw | 11–5–6 | Hiroki Nagaoka | Draw | Pancrase: Spiral 2 | March 6, 2005 | 2 | 5:00 | Yokohama, Kanagawa, Japan | |
| Loss | 11–5–5 | Katsuya Inoue | Decision (Unanimous) | Pancrase: Brave 8 | September 24, 2004 | 3 | 5:00 | Tokyo, Japan | Return to Welterweight. |
| Win | 11–4–5 | Hidetaka Monma | Decision (Majority) | Pancrase: Brave 5 | May 28, 2004 | 3 | 5:00 | Tokyo, Japan | |
| Loss | 10–4–5 | Jorge Santiago | Submission (Armbar) | AFC 7: Absolute Fighting Championships 7 | February 27, 2004 | 1 | 1:52 | Fort Lauderdale, Florida, United States | |
| Win | 10–3–5 | Minoru Ozawa | Decision (Unanimous) | Pancrase: Hybrid 9 | October 31, 2003 | 2 | 5:00 | Tokyo, Japan | Welterweight bout. |
| Draw | 9–3–5 | Kenichi Serizawa | Draw | Pancrase: Hybrid 6 | June 7, 2003 | 3 | 5:00 | Tokyo, Japan | Middleweight debut. |
| Draw | 9–3–4 | Satoru Kitaoka | Draw | Pancrase: Hybrid 4 | April 12, 2003 | 2 | 5:00 | Tokyo, Japan | |
| Draw | 9–3–3 | Koji Oishi | Draw | Pancrase: Hybrid 1 | January 26, 2003 | 2 | 5:00 | Tokyo, Japan | |
| Loss | 9–3–2 | Takafumi Ito | Decision (Unanimous) | Pancrase: Spirit 8 | November 30, 2002 | 3 | 5:00 | Yokohama, Kanagawa, Japan | |
| Loss | 9–2–2 | Dave Strasser | Decision (Split) | Shooto: Treasure Hunt 6 | May 5, 2002 | 3 | 5:00 | Tokyo, Japan | |
| Win | 9–1–2 | Seichi Ikemoto | Decision (Unanimous) | Shooto: Treasure Hunt 3 | February 11, 2002 | 3 | 5:00 | Kobe, Hyogo, Japan | |
| Loss | 8–1–2 | Jutaro Nakao | Submission (Triangle Choke) | Shooto: To The Top Final Act | December 16, 2001 | 1 | 4:07 | Urayasu, Chiba, Japan | |
| Win | 8–0–2 | Jason Buck | Decision (Majority) | Shooto: To The Top 9 | September 27, 2001 | 2 | 5:00 | Tokyo, Japan | |
| Win | 7–0–2 | Isao Tanimura | Decision (Unanimous) | Shooto: To The Top 5 | June 30, 2001 | 2 | 5:00 | Setagaya, Tokyo, Japan | |
| Win | 6–0–2 | Cedric Ribes | Submission (Heel Hook) | GT: Golden Trophy 2001 | March 1, 2001 | 1 | 1:02 | France | |
| Win | 5–0–2 | Rafles la Rose | Decision (Unanimous) | Shooto: R.E.A.D. 12 | November 12, 2000 | 2 | 5:00 | Tokyo, Japan | |
| Draw | 4–0–2 | Yuji Kusu | Draw | Shooto: R.E.A.D. 9 | August 27, 2000 | 2 | 5:00 | Yokohama, Kanagawa, Japan | |
| Draw | 4–0–1 | Seichi Ikemoto | Draw | Shooto: R.E.A.D. 5 | May 22, 2000 | 2 | 5:00 | Tokyo, Japan | |
| Win | 4–0 | Boris Viale | Submission (Choke) | GT: Golden Trophy 2000 | March 18, 2000 | 0 | 0:00 | Orléans, France | |
| Win | 3–0 | Didier Lutz | Submission (Kimura) | GT: Golden Trophy 2000 | March 18, 2000 | 0 | 0:00 | Orléans, France | |
| Win | 2–0 | Rosaire Letapin | Submission (Heel Hook) | GT: Golden Trophy 2000 | March 18, 2000 | 0 | 0:00 | Orléans, France | |
| Win | 1–0 | Saburo Kawakatsu | Decision (Majority) | Shooto: Renaxis 2 | July 16, 1999 | 2 | 5:00 | Tokyo, Japan | |

== Championships and accomplishments ==
=== Mixed martial arts ===
- Pancrase
  - Welterweight King of Pancrase (1 time, interim champion)

=== Professional wrestling ===
- Ganbare☆Pro-Wrestling
  - Spirit of Ganbare World Tag Team Championship (2 times) – with Shuichiro Katsumura (1) and Tyson Maeguchi (1)
- Hard Hit
  - King of Hard Hit Tournament finalist (2020)

== See also ==
- List of male mixed martial artists
