= Ryo Kawamura =

Japanese martial artist

- 川村 亮
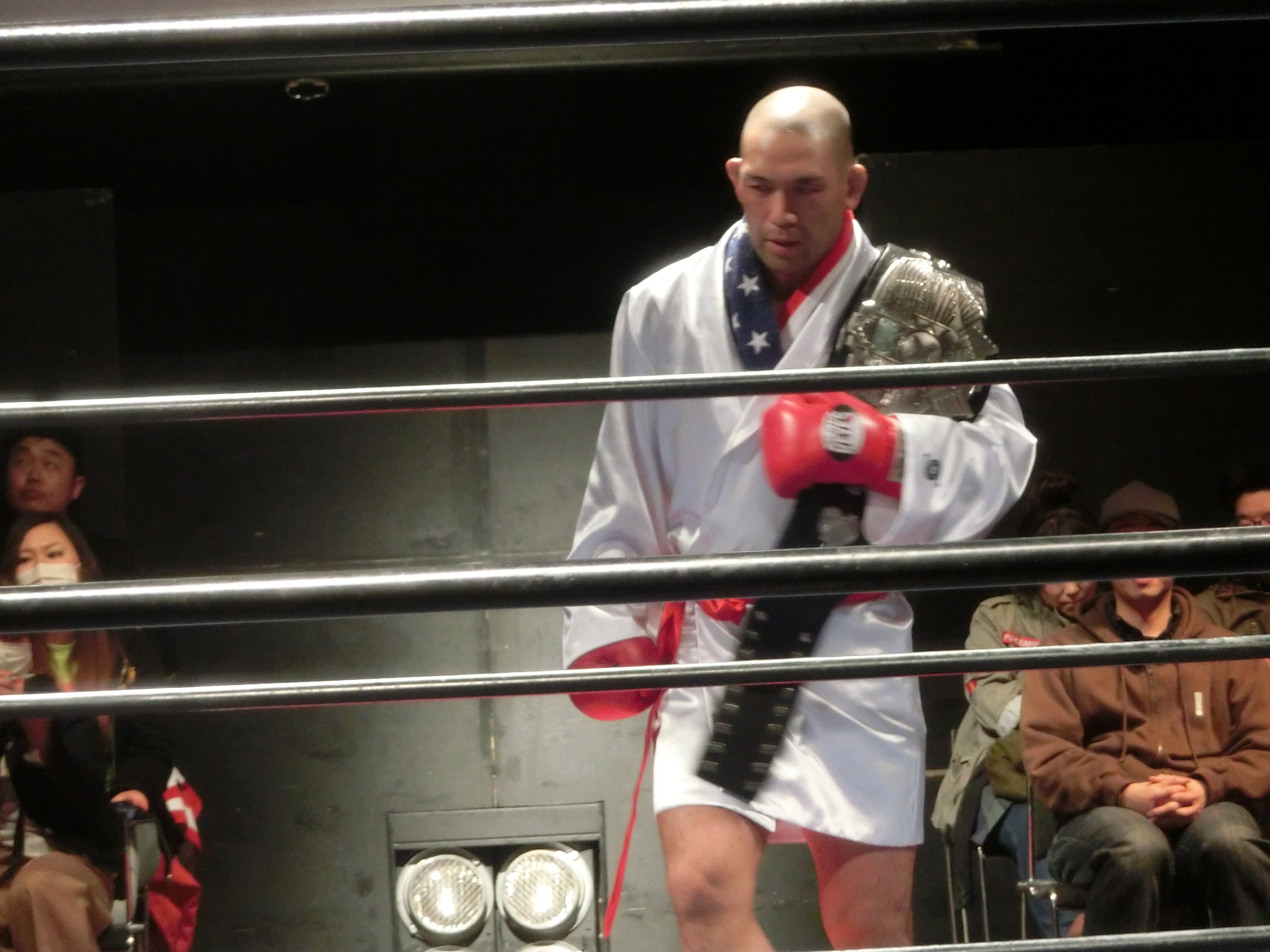
- Kawamura in March 2017
- Born: June 29, 1981 (age 45); Kakamigahara, Gifu, Japan
- Height: 5 ft 11 in (1.80 m)
- Martial arts career
- Other names: Rambo; Smile Ryo-kun; Young Smiling Warrior (Note: Japanese: 笑顔の若武者, Hepburn: egao no wakamusha)
- Weight: 184.4 lb (83.6 kg; 13.17 st)
- Division: Light Heavyweight; Middleweight
- Stance: Orthodox
- Team: Paraestra; PANCRASEism
- Years active: 2005–present

Mixed martial arts record
- Total: 34
- Wins: 19
- By knockout: 11
- By decision: 8
- Losses: 11
- By knockout: 7
- By decision: 4
- Draws: 4

Other information
- Mixed martial arts record from Sherdog
- Professional wrestling career
- Ring names: 2; Rambo Kawamura; Rocky Kawamura; Rocky Kawamura 2; Ryo Kawamura
- Billed height: 1.80 m (5 ft 11 in)
- Billed weight: 90 kg (200 lb)
- Billed from: "Gifudelphia"
- Debut: March 22, 2012

Ryo Kawamura (Japanese: 川村 亮, Hepburn: Kawamura Ryō; born June 29, 1981) is a Japanese mixed martial artist, professional wrestler, and the former executive president of Pancrase Inc. A professional MMA competitor from 2005 until 2014, Kawamura most notably competed for Pancrase, where he is the former King of Pancrase Middleweight Champion and Light Heavyweight Champion. In MMA, also competed for World Victory Road and ONE FC.

Kawamura at the time when he was executive president founded the "Commission Council" as a third-party organization. He carried out structural reforms in Pancrase.

Debuting in professional wrestling for Dramatic Dream Team's Hard Hit brand in 2012, he has wrestled in promotions like All Japan Pro Wrestling, Real Japan Pro Wrestling, Kaientai Dojo and Pro Wrestling Heat Up. He currently wrestles as "2".

== Personal life ==
He is the current executive playing Manager of Pancrase Inc.

== Championships and accomplishments ==
=== Mixed martial arts ===
- Pancrase
  - Light Heavyweight King of Pancrase (one time; former)
    - Three successful title defenses
  - Middleweight King of Pancrase (two times; former)
    - One successful title defense (first reign)
  - Pancrase 2012 Middleweight Tournament Winner
  - Pancrase 2006 Neo Blood Tournament Winner (Light Heavyweight)

=== Professional wrestling ===
- Tokyo Gurentai
  - Tokyo Intercontinental Tag Team Championship (1 time) – with Hikaru Sato

== Mixed martial arts record ==
Professional record breakdown
34 matches	19 wins	11 losses
By knockout	11	7
By decision	8	4
Draws	4	

Res.	Record	Opponent	Method	Event	Date	Round	Time	Location	Notes
Loss	19–11–4	Yura Naito	KO (punch)	Pancrase 326	March 21, 2022	1	0:42	Tokyo, Japan	For the vacant Pancrase Middleweight Championship.
Win	19–10–4	Yuji Arai	KO (knee and punches)	Pancrase 323	September 12, 2021	1	3:03	Tokyo, Japan	
Loss	18–10–4	Yuki Niimura	KO (punch)	Pancrase 291	November 12, 2017	3	0:43	Tokyo, Japan	Lost the Pancrase Middleweight Championship.
Win	18–9–4	Yuki Niimura	KO (punches)	Pancrase 281	October 2, 2016	2	1:30	Tokyo, Japan	Won the vacant Pancrase Middleweight Championship.
Win	17–9–4	Givago Francisco	Decision (unanimous)	Pancrase 273	December 13, 2015	3	3:00	Tokyo, Japan	
Loss	16–9–4	Shinsho Anzai	TKO (punches)	Pancrase 259	June 29, 2014	1	2:52	Tokyo, Japan	Lost the Pancrase Middleweight Championship.
Win	16–8–4	Kazuo Takahashi	TKO (punches)	Pancrase 252	September 29, 2013	1	1:43	Yokohama, Kanagawa, Japan	Non-title bout.
Loss	15–8–4	Lee Dool-hee	Decision (split)	Road FC 012	June 22, 2013	3	5:00	Wonju, South Korea	
Loss	15–7–4	Melvin Manhoef	KO (punch)	ONE FC: Rise of Kings	October 6, 2012	1	4:40	Kallang, Singapore	
Win	15–6–4	Shungo Oyama	KO (soccer kick)	Pancrase: Progress Tour 7	June 2, 2012	1	4:19	Tokyo, Japan	Defended the Pancrase Middleweight Championship.
Win	14–6–4	Ikkei Nagamura	KO (Knee)	Pancrase: Progress Tour 1	January 28, 2012	2	2:18	Tokyo, Japan	Won the Pancrase Middleweight Tournament and the vacant Pancrase Middleweight Championship.
Win	13–6–4	Yuji Hisamatsu	Decision (unanimous)	Pancrase: Progress Tour 1	January 28, 2012	2	5:00	Tokyo, Japan	Pancrase Middleweight Tournament Semifinal.
Draw	12–6–4	Ikkei Nagamura	Draw (majority)	Pancrase: Impressive Tour 5	June 5, 2011	2	5:00	Tokyo, Japan	Return to Middleweight.
Draw	12–6–3	Yuji Sakuragi	Draw (majority)	Pancrase: Passion Tour 11	December 5, 2010	3	5:00	Tokyo, Japan	Retained the Pancrase Light Heavyweight Championship.
Loss	12–6–2	Yuji Sakuragi	TKO (punches)	Pancrase: Passion Tour 8	September 5, 2010	1	3:55	Tokyo, Japan	
Win	12–5–2	Hidetada Irie	TKO (punches)	World Victory Road Presents: Sengoku 13	June 20, 2010	2	3:00	Tokyo, Japan	
Win	11–5–2	Shunsuke Inoue	Decision (majority)	Pancrase: Changing Tour 8	December 6, 2009	3	5:00	Tokyo, Japan	Defended the Pancrase Light Heavyweight Championship.
Loss	10–5–2	Fábio Silva	TKO (corner stoppage)	World Victory Road Presents: Sengoku 10	September 23, 2009	1	2:28	Saitama, Japan	
Win	10–4–2	Yukiya Naito	Decision (unanimous)	Pancrase: Changing Tour 3	June 7, 2009	3	5:00	Tokyo, Japan	Defended the Pancrase Light Heavyweight Championship.
Loss	9–4–2	Muhammed Lawal	Decision (unanimous)	World Victory Road Presents: Sengoku 7	March 20, 2009	3	5:00	Tokyo, Japan	
Win	9–3–2	Keiichiro Yamamiya	Decision (unanimous)	Pancrase: Shining 8	October 1, 2008	3	5:00	Tokyo, Japan	Won the vacant Pancrase Light Heavyweight Championship.
Loss	8–3–2	Kevin Randleman	Decision (unanimous)	World Victory Road Presents: Sengoku 2	May 18, 2008	3	5:00	Tokyo, Japan	Return to Light Heavyweight.
Win	8–2–2	Antônio Braga Neto	Decision (unanimous)	World Victory Road Presents: Sengoku First Battle	March 5, 2008	3	5:00	Tokyo, Japan	Middleweight debut.
Loss	7–2–2	Keiichiro Yamamiya	Decision (unanimous)	Pancrase: Rising 10	December 22, 2007	3	5:00	Tokyo, Japan	
Win	7–1–2	Jaime Fletcher	KO (soccer kick)	Pancrase: Rising 6	September 5, 2007	1	1:36	Tokyo, Japan	
Loss	6–1–2	Fábio Silva	KO (punches)	Pancrase: Rising 5	May 30, 2007	2	3:44	Tokyo, Japan	Return to Light Heavyweight.
Win	6–0–2	Hiromitsu Kanehara	KO (punches)	Pancrase: Rising 3	March 18, 2007	3	1:36	Tokyo, Japan	Heavyweight debut.
Draw	5–0–2	Nilson de Castro	Draw (majority)	Pancrase: Blow 11	December 10, 2006	3	5:00	Tokyo, Japan	
Win	5–0–1	Daniel Acacio	KO (punch)	Pancrase: Blow 7	September 16, 2006	2	2:40	Tokyo, Japan	
Win	4–0–1	Sumio Koyano	KO (punches)	Pancrase: 2006 Neo-Blood Tournament Finals	July 28, 2006	1	1:15	Tokyo, Japan	Won the 2006 Pancrase Neo Blood Light Heavyweight Tournament.
Win	3–0–1	Yuta Watanabe	KO (punch)	Pancrase: 2006 Neo-Blood Tournament Semifinals	April 2, 2006	1	2:35	Tokyo, Japan	2006 Pancrase Neo Blood Light Heavyweight Tournament Semifinal.
Draw	2–0–1	Yuta Watanabe	Draw (unanimous)	Pancrase: Blow 1	January 26, 2006	2	5:00	Tokyo, Japan	
Win	2–0	Sumio Koyano	Decision (unanimous)	Pancrase: Spiral 10	December 4, 2005	2	5:00	Tokyo, Japan	
Win	1–0	Yusaku Tsukumo	Decision (unanimous)	Greatest Common Multiple: Demolition 05/07/27	July 27, 2005	2	5:00	Tokyo, Japan	Light Heavyweight debut.

== See also ==
- List of current mixed martial arts champions
- List of male mixed martial artists
