= 2006 in Pancrase =

Mixed martial arts events

Information
- First date: January 26, 2006
- Last date: December 10, 2006

Events
- Total events: 14

Fights
- Total fights: 154
- Title fights: 6

Chronology
2005 in Pancrase	2006 in Pancrase	2007 in Pancrase

The year 2006 was the 14th year in the history of Pancrase, a mixed martial arts promotion based in Japan. In 2006 Pancrase held 14 events beginning with Pancrase: Blow 1.

== Title fights ==
Title fights in 2006
Weight class				Method	Round	Time	Event	Notes
Welterweight	Satoru Kitaoka	vs.	Katsuya Inoue (c)	Draw	3	5:00	Pancrase: Blow 1	(Note: For the Pancrase Welterweight Championship.)
Middleweight	Yuichi Nakanishi	vs.	Kozo Urita	Draw	2	5:00	Pancrase: Blow 3	(Note: For the Pancrase Middleweight Championship.)
Light Heavyweight	Yuki Kondo (c)	def.	Daijiro Matsui	Decision (Unanimous)	3	5:00	Pancrase: Blow 6	(Note: For the Pancrase Light Heavyweight Championship.)
Featherweight	Yoshiro Maeda	def.	Daiki Hata	Decision (Split)	3	5:00	Pancrase: Blow 6	(Note: For the Pancrase Featherweight Championship.)
Welterweight	Daizo Ishige	def.	Katsuya Inoue (c)	Decision (Unanimous)	3	5:00	Pancrase: Blow 6	(Note: For the Pancrase Welterweight Championship.)
Heavyweight	Kestutis Arbocius	def.	Poai Suganuma	TKO (Doctor Stoppage)	3	0:34	Pancrase: Blow 6	(Note: For the Pancrase Heavyweight Championship.)

== Events list ==
#	Event title	Date	Arena	Location
179	Pancrase: Blow 11	December 10, 2006	Differ Ariake Arena	Tokyo, Japan
178	Pancrase: Blow 10	December 2, 2006	Differ Ariake Arena	Tokyo, Japan
177	Pancrase: Blow 9	October 25, 2006	Korakuen Hall	Tokyo, Japan
176	Pancrase: Blow 8	October 1, 2006	Umeda Stella Hall	Osaka, Osaka, Japan
175	Pancrase: Blow 7	September 16, 2006	Differ Ariake Arena	Tokyo, Japan
174	Pancrase: Blow 6	August 27, 2006	Yokohama Cultural Gymnasium	Yokohama, Kanagawa, Japan
173	Pancrase: 2006 Neo-Blood Tournament Finals	July 28, 2006	Korakuen Hall	Tokyo, Japan
172	Pancrase: Blow 5	June 6, 2006	Korakuen Hall	Tokyo, Japan
171	Pancrase: Blow 4	May 2, 2006	Korakuen Hall	Tokyo, Japan
170	Pancrase: Blow 3	April 9, 2006	Differ Ariake Arena	Tokyo, Japan
169	Pancrase: 2006 Neo-Blood Tournament Semifinals	April 2, 2006	Gold's Gym South Tokyo Annex	Tokyo, Japan
168	Pancrase: Blow 2	March 19, 2006	Umeda Stella Hall	Osaka, Osaka, Japan
167	Pancrase: 2006 Neo-Blood Tournament Eliminations	February 19, 2006	Gold's Gym South Tokyo Annex	Tokyo, Japan
166	Pancrase: Blow 1	January 26, 2006	Korakuen Hall	Tokyo, Japan

== Pancrase: Blow 1 ==
Pancrase: Blow 1
- Date: January 26, 2006
- Venue: Korakuen Hall
- City: Tokyo, Japan

Pancrase: Blow 1 was an event held on January 26, 2006 at Korakuen Hall in Tokyo, Japan.

=== Results ===
Main Card
Weight class				Method	Round	Time	Notes
Welterweight	Satoru Kitaoka	vs.	Katsuya Inoue (c)	Draw	3	5:00	(Note: For the Pancrase Welterweight Championship.)
	Yuji Sakuragi	def.	Hikaru Sato	TKO (Soccer Kicks)	1	0:55
	Poai Suganuma	def.	Hideki Tadao	KO (Punches)	1	3:58
	Daizo Ishige	def.	Koji Oishi	Decision (Majority)	3	5:00
	Kozo Urita	def.	Riki Fukuda	KO (Punch)	1	0:40
	Mitsuhisa Sunabe	def.	Russ Miura	Decision (Unanimous)	3	5:00
	Manabu Inoue	vs.	Takumi Murata	Draw	2	5:00
	Azat Askerov	vs.	Turbo Fairtex	Draw	2	5:00
	Ryo Kawamura	vs.	Yuta Watanabe	Draw	2	5:00

== Pancrase: 2006 Neo-Blood Tournament Eliminations ==
Pancrase: 2006 Neo-Blood Tournament Eliminations
- Date: February 19, 2006
- Venue: Gold's Gym South Tokyo Annex
- City: Tokyo, Japan

Pancrase: 2006 Neo-Blood Tournament Eliminations was an event held on February 19, 2006 at Gold's Gym South Tokyo Annex in Tokyo, Japan.

=== Results ===
Main Card
Weight class				Method	Round	Time	Notes
	Mitsuo Matsumoto	def.	Yuichi Ikari	TKO (Doctor Stoppage)	1	2:04
	Tashiro Nishiuchi	def.	Minoru Chujo	Decision (Unanimous)	2	5:00
	Eriya Matsuda	def.	Takaichi Hirayama	KO (Punch)	1	0:34
	Ryusuke Uemura	def.	Kenta Nakamura	Decision (Unanimous)	2	5:00
	Masaki Yanagisawa	def.	Yuichiro Shirai	Technical Submission (Triangle Choke)	1	2:34
	Shinya Kumazawa	def.	Satoru Takadaya	Submission (Heel Hook)	1	2:30
	Taku Aramaki	def.	Junichi Ota	Submission (Straight Armbar)	1	4:46
	Shinya Kumazawa	def.	Seiji Takeda	Submission (Heel Hook)	1	2:14
	Satoru Takadaya	def.	Ryo Nakajima	Decision (Majority)	1	5:00
	Taku Aramaki	def.	Hirotoshi Saito	Submission (Rear-Naked Choke)	1	4:42
	Tatsuya So	def.	Shigeyuki Uchiyama	Submission (Guillotine Choke)	2	2:17
	Takashi Hasegawa	def.	Kenichi Matsuo	Decision (Majority)	1	5:00
	Shinya Kumazawa	def.	Manabu Chujo	Submission (Kimura)	1	2:23
	Seiji Takeda	def.	Luiz Andrade I	Submission (Armbar)	2	1:19
	Ryo Nakajima	def.	Naoki Miyamoto	Decision (Unanimous)	1	5:00
	Satoru Takadaya	def.	Yuki Takaya	Decision (Majority)	1	5:00
	Hirotoshi Saito	def.	Kenta Okuyama	Decision (Split)	1	3:00
	Taku Aramaki	def.	Takashi Nomiya	Submission (Scarf Hold Armlock)	1	3:58
	Junichi Ota	def.	Kenichi Ito	Decision (Majority)	1	5:00
	Shoji Maruyama	def.	Seigo Inoue	Decision (Unanimous)	1	5:00
	Tatsuya So	def.	Hirokazu Nishimura	Decision (Unanimous)	1	5:00
	Shigeyuki Uchiyama	def.	Takeshi Kurotani	Decision (Majority)	1	5:00
	Kenichi Matsuo	def.	Yo Saito	Decision (Majority)	1	5:00
	Takashi Hasegawa	def.	Daisuke Oishi	Submission (Kimura)	1	3:12

== Pancrase: Blow 2 ==
Pancrase: Blow 2
- Date: March 19, 2006
- Venue: Umeda Stella Hall
- City: Osaka, Osaka, Japan

Pancrase: Blow 2 was an event held on March 19, 2006 at Umeda Stella Hall in Osaka, Osaka, Japan.

=== Results ===
Main Card
Weight class				Method	Round	Time	Notes
	Daiki Hata	def.	Yoshiro Maeda	TKO (Punches)	2	0:35
	Satoru Kitaoka	def.	Tatsunori Tanaka	Submission (Guillotine Choke)	2	2:53
	Hikaru Sato	def.	Daisuke Hanazawa	Submission (Toe Hold)	2	2:01
	Yuji Miyazaki	vs.	Naoki Yoshimura	Draw	2	2:10
	Hidemi Mihara	vs.	Masato Nishiguchi	Draw	2	5:00
	Asuka Ito	def.	Yukari Yukari	Submission (Armbar)	3	2:45
	Masahiro Toryu	def.	Kiichi Kunimoto	KO (Head Kick)	1	0:05
	Hiroshi Tomita	def.	Takeshi Takano	Submission (Armbar)	2	3:58
	Kenji Ezaki	def.	Nobuhiro Yamauchi	Technical Submission (Armbar)	2	3:51
	Tetsuo Uehata	def.	Hiroshi Sano	Submission (Kneebar)	1	0:27

== Pancrase: 2006 Neo-Blood Tournament Semifinals ==
Pancrase: 2006 Neo-Blood Tournament Semifinals
- Date: April 2, 2006
- Venue: Gold's Gym South Tokyo Annex
- City: Tokyo, Japan

Pancrase: 2006 Neo-Blood Tournament Semifinals was an event held on April 2, 2006 at Gold's Gym South Tokyo Annex in Tokyo, Japan.

=== Results ===
Main Card
Weight class				Method	Round	Time	Notes
	Ryo Kawamura	def.	Yuta Watanabe	KO (Punch)	1	2:35
	Sumio Koyano	def.	Mike Molina	Decision (Split)	2	5:00
	Asaki Honda	def.	Yohei Ota	KO (Punch)	1	0:53
	Shinya Kumazawa	def.	Toshikatsu Harada	Submission (Rear-Naked Choke)	1	4:10
	Tashiro Nishiuchi	def.	Taku Aramaki	Decision (Unanimous)	2	5:00
	Eriya Matsuda	def.	Mitsuo Matsumoto	TKO (Punches)	2	3:46
	Ryusuke Uemura	def.	Takashi Hasegawa	Decision (Unanimous)	2	5:00
	Tatsuya So	def.	Masaki Yanagisawa	Decision (Unanimous)	2	5:00
	Jinzaburo Yonezawa	def.	Atsuo Hirano	Submission (Rear-Naked Choke)	2	4:19
	Yuichi Miyagi	def.	Motomare Takahashi	KO (Punch)	1	0:54

== Pancrase: Blow 3 ==
Pancrase: Blow 3
- Date: April 9, 2006
- Venue: Differ Ariake Arena
- City: Tokyo, Japan

Pancrase: Blow 3 was an event held on April 9, 2006 at Differ Ariake Arena in Tokyo, Japan.

=== Results ===
Main Card
Weight class				Method	Round	Time	Notes
	Ryuta Noji	def.	Takashi Sugiura	KO (Stomps)	1	3:25
	Kestutis Arbocius	def.	Hiromitsu Kanehara	Decision (Unanimous)	2	5:00
	Yuji Hisamatsu	def.	Daisuke Watanabe	Decision (Unanimous)	3	5:00
	Miki Shida	def.	Damacio Page	Decision (Unanimous)	3	5:00
Middleweight	Yuichi Nakanishi	vs.	Kozo Urita	Draw	2	5:00	(Note: For the Pancrase Middleweight Championship.)
	Takuya Wada	vs.	Shinsuke Shoji	Draw	2	5:00
	Atsushi Yamamoto	def.	Takumi Murata	Technical Submission (Rear-Naked Choke)	2	1:37
	Ichiro Kanai	def.	Moriyuki Yamada	Technical Submission (Rear-Naked Choke)	1	2:11

== Pancrase: Blow 4 ==
Pancrase: Blow 4
- Date: May 2, 2006
- Venue: Korakuen Hall
- City: Tokyo, Japan

Pancrase: Blow 4 was an event held on May 2, 2006 at Korakuen Hall in Tokyo, Japan.

=== Results ===
Main Card
Weight class				Method	Round	Time	Notes
	Daizo Ishige	def.	Satoru Kitaoka	Decision (Unanimous)	3	5:00
	Poai Suganuma	def.	Yuji Sakuragi	TKO (Punches)	1	4:47
	Robert Emerson	def.	Takafumi Ito	Decision (Unanimous)	3	5:00
	Izuru Takeuchi	def.	Azat Askerov	Decision (Unanimous)	2	5:00
	Yasuaki Miura	def.	Yukio Kawabe	Submission (Armbar)	1	1:43
	Masayuki Kono	def.	Teymur Aliyev	TKO (Punches)	1	4:09
	Atsuo Hirano	vs.	Naoki Miyamoto	Draw	2	5:00

== Pancrase: Blow 5 ==
Pancrase: Blow 5
- Date: June 6, 2006
- Venue: Korakuen Hall
- City: Tokyo, Japan

Pancrase: Blow 5 was an event held on June 6, 2006 at Korakuen Hall in Tokyo, Japan.

=== Results ===
Main Card
Weight class				Method	Round	Time	Notes
	Yoshiro Maeda	def.	Atsushi Yamamoto	KO (Flying Knee)	2	4:36
	Daiki Hata	def.	Miki Shida	TKO (Punches)	2	2:03
	Kestutis Arbocius	def.	Yasuaki Miura	TKO (Punches)	1	1:35
	Sayaka Shioda	def.	Asuka Ito	Decision (Unanimous)	3	3:00
	Daisuke Hanazawa	vs.	Yuji Hisamatsu	Draw	3	5:00
	Anthony Netzler	def.	Seiji Ogura	KO (Punch)	1	0:30
	Naoki Seki	def.	Sotaro Yamada	TKO (Doctor Stoppage)	1	2:36
	Junichi Ota	def.	Kenichi Ito	Technical Submission (Armbar)	1	1:17
	Yuki Yamasawa	def.	Eiichi Nagaya	KO (Knee)	2	1:55

== Pancrase: 2006 Neo-Blood Tournament Finals ==
Pancrase: 2006 Neo-Blood Tournament Finals
- Date: July 28, 2006
- Venue: Korakuen Hall
- City: Tokyo, Japan

Pancrase: 2006 Neo-Blood Tournament Finals was an event held on July 28, 2006 at Korakuen Hall in Tokyo, Japan.

=== Results ===
Main Card
Weight class				Method	Round	Time	Notes
	Ryo Kawamura	def.	Sumio Koyano	KO (Punches)	1	1:15
	Asaki Honda	def.	Shinya Kumazawa	Decision (Unanimous)	2	5:00
	Eriya Matsuda	def.	Tashiro Nishiuchi	Decision (Split)	2	5:00
	Ryusuke Uemura	def.	Tatsuya So	Decision (Unanimous)	2	5:00
	Carlos Condit	def.	Koji Oishi	TKO (Doctor Stoppage)	3	1:01
	Takafumi Ito	vs.	Naoki Yoshimura	Draw	2	5:00
	Riki Fukuda	def.	Yuji Sakuragi	Decision (Unanimous)	2	5:00
	Yuichiro Shirai	vs.	Koji Yoshimoto	Draw	2	5:00
	Tatsuya Mizuno	def.	Keizo Nagaya	Technical Submission (Armbar)	1	4:20
	Rikuhei Fujii	def.	Tomokazu Hitomi	KO (Knee)	1	2:01
	Takeaki Miyakawa	vs.	Yuki Yamasawa	Draw	2	5:00

== Pancrase: Blow 6 ==
Pancrase: Blow 6
- Date: August 27, 2006
- Venue: Yokohama Cultural Gymnasium
- City: Yokohama, Kanagawa, Japan

Pancrase: Blow 6 was an event held on August 27, 2006 at Yokohama Cultural Gymnasium in Yokohama, Kanagawa, Japan.

=== Results ===
Main Card
Weight class				Method	Round	Time	Notes
Light Heavyweight	Yuki Kondo (c)	def.	Daijiro Matsui	Decision (Unanimous)	3	5:00	(Note: For the Pancrase Light Heavyweight Championship.)
Featherweight	Yoshiro Maeda	def.	Daiki Hata	Decision (Split)	3	5:00	(Note: For the Pancrase Featherweight Championship.)
Welterweight	Daizo Ishige	def.	Katsuya Inoue (c)	Decision (Unanimous)	3	5:00	(Note: For the Pancrase Welterweight Championship.)
Heavyweight	Kestutis Arbocius	def.	Poai Suganuma	TKO (Doctor Stoppage)	3	0:34	(Note: For the Pancrase Heavyweight Championship.)
	Izuru Takeuchi	def.	Hikaru Sato	Decision (Unanimous)	3	5:00
	Satoru Kitaoka	def.	Paul Daley	Submission (Guillotine Choke)	1	2:54
	Robert Emerson	def.	Kenji Arai	Decision (Unanimous)	3	5:00
	Henry Miller	def.	Seiji Ogura	Submission (Rear-Naked Choke)	1	1:37

== Pancrase: Blow 7 ==
Pancrase: Blow 7
- Date: September 16, 2006
- Venue: Differ Ariake Arena
- City: Tokyo, Japan

Pancrase: Blow 7 was an event held on September 16, 2006 at Differ Ariake Arena in Tokyo, Japan.

=== Results ===
Main Card
Weight class				Method	Round	Time	Notes
	Ryo Kawamura	def.	Daniel Acacio	KO (Punch)	2	2:40
	Carlos Condit	def.	Takuya Wada	Submission (Kimura)	3	4:22
	Yuji Hoshino	def.	Shinsuke Shoji	Decision (Unanimous)	2	5:00
	Manabu Inoue	def.	Mitsuhisa Sunabe	Decision (Unanimous)	2	5:00
	Masayuki Kono	def.	Daniel Lyons	TKO (Punches)	1	3:46
	Tatsuya Mizuno	def.	Yuji Sakuragi	Submission (Rear-Naked Choke)	2	3:20
	Ichiro Kanai	def.	Yuji Hisamatsu	Decision (Unanimous)	2	5:00
	Naoki Yoshimura	def.	Taku Aramaki	Decision (Majority)	2	5:00
	Kenji Shimada	def.	Yuichiro Shirai	Decision (Unanimous)	2	5:00
	Rikuhei Fujii	def.	Keizo Nagaya	Submission (Armbar)	1	2:14
	Yukio Sakaguchi	def.	Akihiro Ono	KO (Knee)	2	2:47
	Isao Hirose	vs.	Yuki Yamasawa	Draw	2	5:00

== Pancrase: Blow 8 ==
Pancrase: Blow 8
- Date: October 1, 2006
- Venue: Umeda Stella Hall
- City: Osaka, Osaka, Japan

Pancrase: Blow 8 was an event held on October 1, 2006 at Umeda Stella Hall in Osaka, Osaka, Japan.

=== Results ===
Main Card
Weight class				Method	Round	Time	Notes
	Yuki Kondo	vs.	Jean-Francois Lenogue	Draw	3	5:00
	Daichi Fujiwara	def.	Takayuki Hirayasu	DQ (Kick to the Groin)	1	4:43
	Kenji Takeshige	def.	Koichi Tanaka	Submission (Toe Hold)	2	2:38
	Naoji Fujimoto	def.	Yuichi Miyagi	Technical Submission (Armbar)	2	1:18
	Rin Nakai	def.	Asuka Ito	TKO (Doctor Stoppage)	1	1:25
	Shoji Maruyama	def.	Yuji Miyazaki	KO (Flying Knee)	1	0:03
	Nobuhiro Yamauchi	def.	Kenji Ezaki	Decision (Majority)	1	5:00
	Noriyuki Kitaura	def.	Motoki Ejima	TKO (Doctor Stoppage)	1	0:36
	Kiichi Kunimoto	def.	Teruyoshi Aoyama	Submission (Arm-Triangle Choke)	2	2:58
	Shohei Mitsuda	vs.	Satoru Takadaya	Draw	2	5:00
	Yuichiro Nagashima	def.	Hiromu Nagado	KO (Punch)	1	0:12
	Toru Akasaki	def.	Kenichi Yasunaga	Submission (Armbar)	1	0:59
	Soyu Tanabe	def.	Hiroshi Sano	Submission (Armbar)	1	3:20
	Nobuhiro Yamauchi	def.	Tetsuo Uehata	Submission (Armbar)	1	2:03
	Kenji Ezaki	def.	Shunsuke Kimura	Submission (Ankle Lock)	1	4:33

== Pancrase: Blow 9 ==
Pancrase: Blow 9
- Date: October 25, 2006
- Venue: Korakuen Hall
- City: Tokyo, Japan

Pancrase: Blow 9 was an event held on October 25, 2006 at Korakuen Hall in Tokyo, Japan.

=== Results ===
Main Card
Weight class				Method	Round	Time	Notes
	Satoru Kitaoka	def.	Ju Pyo Hong	Submission (Achilles Lock)	1	0:24
	Carlos Condit	def.	Tatsunori Tanaka	KO (Stomps)	1	2:13
	Koji Oishi	def.	In Seok Kim	KO (Punch)	1	2:31
	Hikaru Sato	def.	Tomoyoshi Iwamiya	Decision (Unanimous)	2	5:00
	Atsushi Yamamoto	def.	Masaki Yanagisawa	Decision (Unanimous)	2	5:00
	Daichi Fujiwara	def.	Michihisa Asano	Submission (Kneebar)	1	0:39
	Kozo Urita	def.	Rikuhei Fujii	Decision (Unanimous)	2	5:00
	Yuki Yamasawa	def.	Tomoki Murayama	Decision (Unanimous)	2	5:00
	Tatsuya Nakama	vs.	Sojiro Orui	Draw	2	5:00
	Tadasuke Yoshida	def.	Masayoshi Ichikawa	Submission (Armbar)	2	0:41
	Koichiro Matsumoto	vs.	Junichi Ota	Draw	2	5:00

== Pancrase: Blow 10 ==
Pancrase: Blow 10
- Date: December 2, 2006
- Venue: Differ Ariake Arena
- City: Tokyo, Japan

Pancrase: Blow 10 was an event held on December 2, 2006 at Differ Ariake Arena in Tokyo, Japan.

=== Results ===
Main Card
Weight class				Method	Round	Time	Notes
	Yuichi Nakanishi	def.	Izuru Takeuchi	Decision (Split)	3	5:00
	Mu Bae Choi	def.	Masayuki Kono	Submission (Arm-Triangle Choke)	2	1:36
	Manabu Inoue	def.	Kenji Shimada	Decision (Unanimous)	2	5:00
	Takuya Wada	def.	Tadasuke Yoshida	Submission (Rear-Naked Choke)	1	4:22
	Tatsuya Mizuno	def.	Yasuaki Miura	Technical Submission (Kimura)	1	1:47
	Artur Oumakhanov	def.	Yuji Miyazaki	TKO (Suplex)	1	1:03
	Shoji Maruyama	def.	Taku Aramaki	KO (Stomps)	1	3:36
	Koji Yoshimoto	def.	Yuki Yamasawa	Decision (Majority)	2	5:00
	Yuichiro Shirai	vs.	Kenta Nakamura	Draw	2	5:00
	Hiroshi Arakawa	def.	Kosuke Nakamoto	TKO (Punches to the Body)	2	2:32
	Isao Hirose	vs.	Ryota Sasaki	Draw	2	5:00

== Pancrase: Blow 11 ==
Pancrase: Blow 11
- Date: December 10, 2006
- Venue: Differ Ariake Arena
- City: Tokyo, Japan

Pancrase: Blow 11 was an event held on December 10, 2006 at Differ Ariake Arena in Tokyo, Japan.

=== Results ===
Main Card
Weight class				Method	Round	Time	Notes
	Yuki Kondo	def.	Ian Nai	Submission (Rear Naked Choke)	1	1:30
	Daizo Ishige	def.	Kenji Arai	Decision (Unanimous)	3	5:00
	Ryo Kawamura	vs.	Nilson de Castro	Draw	3	5:00
	Takafumi Ito	def.	Eriya Matsuda	Decision (Majority)	2	5:00
	Hikaru Sato	def.	Sviatoslav Matafonov	Decision (Unanimous)	2	5:00
	Koji Oishi	def.	Hiroyuki Nozawa	TKO (Punches)	1	4:53
	Kanako Takeshita	def.	Tomomi Sunaba	Submission (Armbar)	3	2:08
	Masahiro Toryu	def.	Nobuhiro Tsurumaki	KO (Punch)	1	1:16
	Miki Shida	def.	Daichi Fujiwara	TKO (Back Injury)	1	0:36

== See also ==
- List of Pancrase champions
- List of Pancrase events
