= Daiki Hata =

Japanese martial artist

- Born: August 24, 1982 (age 44); Saitama, Japan
- Other names: DJ.Taiki
- Nationality: Japanese
- Height: 5 ft 8 in (1.73 m)
- Weight: 141 lb (64 kg; 10.1 st)
- Division: Featherweight (former); Bantamweight (current)
- Style: Kickboxing, Shootboxing, Wrestling
- Stance: Orthodox
- Fighting out of: Chiba, Japan
- Team: K.I.B.A. DEEP Impact Training Facility
- Years active: 2004–present

Kickboxing record
- Total: 5
- Wins: 2
- By knockout: 1
- Losses: 1
- Draws: 2

Mixed martial arts record
- Total: 45
- Wins: 23
- By knockout: 9
- By submission: 2
- By decision: 12
- Losses: 15
- By knockout: 1
- By decision: 14
- Draws: 7

Other information
- Mixed martial arts record from Sherdog

Daiki Hata (Japanese: 畑 大樹, Hata Daiki; born August 24, 1982) is a Japanese professional mixed martial artist and the former DEEP Bantamweight Champion. He is also an occasional kickboxer.

== Mixed martial arts career ==
=== Japanese career ===
Daiki began his professional MMA career in July 2004 for the Pancrase promotion. Over the next four years, he amassed a record of 8 wins, 5 losses and 1 draw primarily in that promotion. During this time he had a victory over WEC contenders Kenji Osawa.

In August 2008, Daiki began fighting for the DEEP promotion. Over the next few years he would also fight for DREAM, K-1, Cage Force, and S-Cup.

In April 2013, Daiki defeated Yoshiro Maeda to become the DEEP Bantamweight Champion. He vacated the title

=== Road to UFC: Japan ===
In June 2015, Hata was announced as one of the eight featherweights competing on Road to UFC: Japan, a show in the style of The Ultimate Fighter. He defeated Tatsunao Nagakura in the quarterfinals. In the semifinals, he lost to Mizuto Hirota by decision.

=== Rizin Fighting Federation ===
In his debut for the Rizin Fighting Federation, Hata faced Hiroyuki Takaya on December 29, 2015. He lost the fight via unanimous decision.

=== Return to DEEP ===
After the one-fight stint in Rizin FF, Hata returned to DEEP to face Yuki Motoya at DEEP Cage Impact 2016 on October 18, 2016. He lost the fight via unanimous decision.

Hata then went on to lose against Takahiro Ashida before defeating Kyosuke Yokoyama and Koichi Ishizuka consecutively, earning him a title shot. Hata challenged Satoshi Yamasu for the DEEP Featherweight Championship at DEEP 89 on May 12, 2019. He lost the bout via second-round technical knockout.

Hata then faced Kouya Kanda at DEEP 100 on February 21, 2021. He lost the fight via unanimous decision.

Hata faced Tetsuya Seki at DEEP 103 on September 23, 2021. He won the bout via unanimous decision.

Hata faced Kosuke Terashima at DEEP 107 on MAy 8, 2022 for the Interim DEEP Bantamweight Championship. He lost the bout via unanimous decision.

Hata faced Jinnosuke Kashimura on March 25, 2023 at DEEP Tokyo Impact 2023 2nd Round, winning the bout via unanimous decision.

== Championships and accomplishments ==
- DEEP
  - DEEP Bantamweight Champion (one time; former)

== Mixed martial arts record ==
Professional record breakdown
45 matches	23 wins	15 losses
By knockout	9	1
By submission	2	0
By decision	12	14
Draws	7	

Res.	Record	Opponent	Method	Event	Date	Round	Time	Location	Notes
Win	23–15–7	Naoki Ueda	Decision (unanimous)	DEEP Tokyo Impact 2023 5th Round	September 10, 2023	3	5:00	Tokyo, Japan	
Win	22–15–7	Jinnosuke Kashimura	Decision (unanimous)	DEEP Tokyo Impact 2023 2nd Round	March 25, 2023	3	5:00	Tokyo, Japan	Return to Bantamweight.
Loss	21–15–7	Kosuke Terashima	Decision (unanimous)	DEEP: 107 Impact	May 8, 2022	3	5:00	Tokyo, Japan	For the Interim DEEP Featherweight Championship.
Win	21–14–7	Tetsuya Seki	Decision (unanimous)	DEEP: 103 Impact	September 23, 2021	3	5:00	Tokyo, Japan	
Loss	20–14–7	Kouya Kanda	Decision (unanimous)	DEEP 100 Impact - 20th Anniversary	February 21, 2021	3	5:00	Tokyo, Japan	
Win	20–13–7	Yuki Ohara	Submission (arm-triangle choke)	DEEP: 93 Impact	December 15, 2019	1	1:35	Tokyo, Japan	
Loss	19–13–7	Satoshi Yamasu	TKO (punches)	DEEP: 89 Impact	May 12, 2019	2	0:11	Tokyo, Japan	For the DEEP Featherweight Championship.
Win	19–12–7	Koichi Ishizuka	Decision (unanimous)	DEEP: 87 Impact	December 22, 2018	3	5:00	Tokyo, Japan	
Win	18–12–7	Kyosuke Yokoyama	Decision (unanimous)	DEEP: 85 Impact	August 26, 2018	3	5:00	Tokyo, Japan	
Loss	17–12–7	Takahiro Ashida	Decision (unanimous)	DEEP: 79 Impact	September 16, 2017	3	5:00	Tokyo, Japan	Return to Featherweight.
Loss	17–11–7	Yuki Motoya	Decision (unanimous)	DEEP Cage Impact 2016	October 18, 2016	3	5:00	Tokyo, Japan	
Loss	17–10–7	Hiroyuki Takaya	Decision (unanimous)	Rizin Fighting Federation 1: Day 1	December 29, 2015	3	5:00	Saitama, Japan	Featherweight bout.
Win	17–9–7	Seiji Akao	Decision (split)	DEEP: 69th Impact	October 26, 2014	3	5:00	Tokyo, Japan	
Win	16–9–7	Yoshiro Maeda	TKO (punches)	DEEP: 62nd Impact	April 26, 2013	2	1:41	Tokyo, Japan	Won the DEEP Bantamweight Championship.
Win	15–9–7	Toshiaki Kitada	Decision (unanimous)	DEEP: 61st Impact	February 16, 2013	3	5:00	Tokyo, Japan	
Win	14–9–7	Yoshiki Harada	TKO (punches)	DEEP: Cage Impact 2012	December 8, 2012	2	4:33	Tokyo, Japan	
Draw	13–9–7	Toshiaki Kitada	Draw (majority)	DEEP: 60th Impact	October 19, 2012	3	5:00	Tokyo, Japan	
Win	13–9–6	Seiji Akao	KO (punches)	DEEP: 59th Impact	August 18, 2012	1	3:20	Tokyo, Japan	
Draw	12–9–6	Makoto Kamaya	Draw (majority)	DEEP: 58th Impact	June 15, 2012	2	5:00	Tokyo, Japan	
Draw	12–9–5	Tomomi Iwama	Draw	DEEP: Cage Impact 2012 in Tokyo: Over Again	April 7, 2012	2	5:00	Tokyo, Japan	
Win	12–9–4	Yusaku Nakamura	TKO (punches)	DEEP: 57th Impact	February 18, 2012	1	3:57	Tokyo, Japan	
Loss	11–9–4	Tatsumitsu Wada	Decision (unanimous)	DEEP: 55th Impact	August 26, 2011	2	5:00	Tokyo, Japan	
Loss	11–8–4	Masakazu Imanari	Decision (unanimous)	Deep: 50 Impact	October 24, 2010	3	5:00	Tokyo, Japan	Bantamweight debut.
Loss	11–7–4	Mitsuhiro Ishida	Decision (unanimous)	DREAM.15	July 10, 2010	2	5:00	Saitama, Saitama, Japan	
Loss	11–6–4	Kazuyuki Miyata	Decision (unanimous)	DREAM.11	October 6, 2009	2	5:00	Yokohama, Japan	DREAM Featherweight Grand Prix Reserve Bout
Win	11–5–4	Hideo Tokoro	Decision (unanimous)	DREAM.8	April 5, 2009	2	5:00	Nagoya, Japan	DREAM Featherweight Grand Prix Opening Round
Win	10–5–4	Shoji Maruyama	Decision (unanimous)	Deep: Fan Thanksgiving Festival	February 10, 2009	3	5:00	Tokyo, Japan	
Win	9–5–4	Naoya Uematsu	TKO (punches)	Deep: 39 Impact	December 10, 2008	1	2:30	Tokyo, Japan	Catchweight (140 lb) bout.
Draw	8–5–4	Jong Man Kim	Draw	Deep: 37 Impact	August 17, 2008	3	5:00	Tokyo, Japan	
Win	8–5–3	David Love	Submission (triangle choke)	Freestyle Combat Challenge 35	May 3, 2008	3	4:48	Racine, Wisconsin, United States	
Loss	7–5–3	Marlon Sandro	Decision (unanimous)	Pancrase: Rising 9	November 28, 2007	3	5:00	Tokyo, Japan	
Loss	7–4–3	Eben Oroz	Decision (majority)	bodogFight - Vancouver	August 25, 2007	3	5:00	Vancouver, British Columbia, Canada	
Win	7–3–3	Jameel Massouh	TKO (punches)	Pancrase - Rising 5	May 30, 2007	2	4:50	Tokyo, Japan	
Win	6–3–3	Kentaro Imaizumi	Decision (majority)	Pancrase: Rising 3	March 18, 2007	2	5:00	Tokyo, Japan	
Loss	5–3–3	Yoshiro Maeda	Decision (split)	Pancrase: Blow 6	August 27, 2006	3	5:00	Kanagawa Prefecture, Japan	For the inaugural Pancrase Featherweight Championship.
Win	5–2–3	Miki Shida	TKO (punches)	Pancrase: Blow 5	June 6, 2006	2	2:03	Tokyo, Japan	
Win	4–2–3	Yoshiro Maeda	TKO (punches)	Pancrase: Blow 2	March 19, 2006	2	0:35	Osaka, Japan	
Win	3–2–3	Kenji Osawa	Decision (split)	GCM - D.O.G 4	December 11, 2005	2	5:00	Tokyo, Japan	
Win	2–2–3	Takeshi Sato	TKO (punches)	GCM - Demolition 051027	October 27, 2005	1	3:49	Tokyo, Japan	
Loss	1–2–3	Takumi Murata	Decision (unanimous)	Pancrase: Spiral 6	July 31, 2005	2	5:00	Tokyo, Japan	
Win	1–1–3	Kentaro Imaizumi	Decision (unanimous)	Pancrase: Spiral 5	July 10, 2005	2	5:00	Yokohama, Japan	
Draw	0–1–3	Katsuhiro Hirata	Draw	Pancrase: 2005 Neo-Blood Tournament Semifinals	June 5, 2005	2	5:00	Tokyo, Japan	
Loss	0–1–2	Naoji Fujimoto	Decision (unanimous)	Pancrase: 2005 Neo-Blood Tournament Eliminations	February 27, 2005	2	5:00	Tokyo, Japan	
Draw	0–0–2	Takumi Murata	Draw	GCM - Demolition 041015	October 15, 2004	2	5:00	Tokyo, Japan	
Draw	0–0–1	Ryusuke Uemura	Draw	Pancrase: 2004 Neo-Blood Tournament Final	July 25, 2004	2	5:00	Tokyo, Japan	Featherweight debut.

== Kickboxing record ==
Kickboxing record
2 wins (1 (T)KO's), 1 loss
Result	Opponent	Method	Event	Date	Round	Time	Location	Notes
Win	Tomohiro Oikawa	KO (left hook)	Shoot Boxing World Tournament 2010	November 23, 2010	2	2:18	Tokyo, Japan	
Loss	Yuta Kubo	Decision (unanimous)	K-1 World MAX 2010 -63kg Japan Tournament Final 16	May 2, 2010	3	3:00	Tokyo, Japan	
Win	Kazuhisa Watanabe	Decision (unanimous)	K-1 World MAX 2010 –70 kg Japan Tournament	March 27, 2010	3	3:00	Saitama, Japan	

Legend: Win Loss Draw/No contest
