= 2007 in Pancrase =

Mixed martial arts events

Information
- First date: February 4, 2007
- Last date: December 22, 2007

Events
- Total events: 17

Fights
- Total fights: 193
- Title fights: 3

Chronology
2006 in Pancrase	2007 in Pancrase	2008 in Pancrase

The year 2007 was the 15th year in the history of Pancrase, a mixed martial arts promotion based in Japan. In 2007 Pancrase held 17 events beginning with Pancrase: Rising 1.

== Title fights ==
Title fights in 2007
Weight class				Method	Round	Time	Event	Notes
Welterweight	Katsuya Inoue	def.	Fabricio Nascimento	TKO (Punches)	2	2:33	Pancrase: 2007 Neo-Blood Tournament Semifinals	(Note: For the Pancrase Welterweight Championship.)
Heavyweight	Assuério Silva	def.	Tatsuya Mizuno	TKO (Punches)	2	2:08	Pancrase: Rising 5	(Note: For the Pancrase Heavyweight Championship.)
Middleweight	Izuru Takeuchi	def.	Yuichi Nakanishi (c)	Decision (Unanimous)	3	5:00	Pancrase: Rising 9	(Note: For the Pancrase Middleweight Championship.)

== Events list ==
#	Event Title	Date	Arena	Location
196	Pancrase: Rising 10	December 22, 2007	Differ Ariake Arena	Tokyo, Japan
195	Pancrase: 2007 Korea Neo-Blood Tournament	December 16, 2007		Busan, South Korea
194	Pancrase: Rising 9	November 28, 2007	Korakuen Hall	Tokyo, Japan
193	Pancrase: Hybrid Bout in Utsunomiya 3	October 27, 2007	Utsunomiya City Gymnasium	Utsunomiya, Tochigi, Japan
192	Pancrase: Rising 8	October 14, 2007	Differ Ariake Arena	Tokyo, Japan
191	Pancrase: Rising 7	September 30, 2007	Umeda Stella Hall	Osaka, Osaka, Japan
190	Pancrase: Rising 6	September 5, 2007	Korakuen Hall	Tokyo, Japan
189	Pancrase: 2007 Neo-Blood Tournament Finals	July 27, 2007	Korakuen Hall	Tokyo, Japan
188	Pancrase: Rising 5	May 30, 2007	Korakuen Hall	Tokyo, Japan
187	Pancrase: 2007 Neo-Blood Tournament Semifinals	May 6, 2007	Gold's Gym South Tokyo Annex	Tokyo, Japan
186	Pancrase: Rising 4	April 27, 2007	Korakuen Hall	Tokyo, Japan
185	Pancrase: Real 2007	April 8, 2007	Teruya Diamond Hall	Okinawa, Japan
184	Pancrase: 2007 Neo-Blood Tournament Eliminations	March 25, 2007	Shinkiba 1st Ring	Tokyo, Japan
183	Pancrase: Rising 3	March 18, 2007	Korakuen Hall	Tokyo, Japan
182	Pancrase: Korea Hybrid Challenge	March 11, 2007	Spartan Gym	Geoje, South Gyeongsang, South Korea
181	Pancrase: Rising 2	February 28, 2007	Korakuen Hall	Tokyo, Japan
180	Pancrase: Rising 1	February 4, 2007	Umeda Stella Hall	Osaka, Osaka, Japan

== Pancrase: Rising 1 ==
Pancrase: Rising 1
- Date: February 4, 2007
- Venue: Korakuen Hall
- City: Tokyo, Japan

Pancrase: Rising 1 was an event held on February 4, 2007 at Korakuen Hall in Tokyo, Japan.

=== Results ===
Main Card
Weight class				Method	Round	Time	Notes
	Yoshiro Maeda	def.	Manabu Inoue	TKO (Punches)	1	4:36
	Naoji Fujimoto	vs.	Mitsuhisa Sunabe	Draw	2	5:00
	Masahiro Toryu	def.	Kiichi Kunimoto	Decision (Majority)	2	5:00
	Daisuke Hanazawa	def.	William Animal	Submission (Punches)	2	3:03
	Kenji Takeshige	def.	Jinzaburo Yonezawa	Technical Submission (Arm-Triangle Choke)	1	4:27
	Akihiko Mori	def.	Yuji Miyazaki	Submission (Armbar)	1	2:34
	Yuichi Miyagi	def.	Koichi Tanaka	Decision (Unanimous)	2	5:00
	Nobuhiro Yamauchi	def.	Takashi Hasegawa	Decision (Unanimous)	2	5:00
	Hiroshi Tomita	def.	Tadashi Okada	Submission (Kimura)	1	4:51
	Soyu Tanabe	def.	Nobuhiro Yoshitake	Submission (Armbar)	2	2:06

== Pancrase: Rising 2 ==
Pancrase: Rising 2
- Date: February 28, 2007
- Venue: Korakuen Hall
- City: Tokyo, Japan

Pancrase: Rising 2 was an event held on February 28, 2007 at Korakuen Hall in Tokyo, Japan.

=== Results ===
Main Card
Weight class				Method	Round	Time	Notes
	Satoru Kitaoka	def.	Gustavo Picone	Decision (Unanimous)	3	5:00
	Artur Oumakhanov	def.	Takafumi Ito	Decision (Unanimous)	3	5:00
	Thiago Silva	def.	Tatsuya Mizuno	KO (Soccer Kick)	1	4:29
	Hikaru Sato	def.	Rikuhei Fujii	Decision (Majority)	2	5:00
	Daisuke Watanabe	def.	Tomoyoshi Iwamiya	Submission (Guillotine Choke)	2	0:58
	Tadasuke Yoshida	def.	Shinsuke Shoji	TKO (Knee and Punches)	2	2:06
	Michihisa Asano	vs.	Masaki Yanagisawa	Draw	2	5:00
	Yasutomo Tanaka	def.	Isao Hirose	Decision (Majority)	1	5:00
	Yasutomo Tanaka	def.	Shoko Sato	Decision (Majority)	1	5:00
	Isao Hirose	def.	Ryota Sasaki	Decision (Unanimous)	2	3:00
	Yasutomo Tanaka	def.	Shigeyuki Uchiyama	Decision (Split)	2	3:00
	Shoko Sato	def.	Tomoaki Honda	Decision (Unanimous)	2	3:00
	Ryota Sasaki	def.	Daisuke Sugishima	Decision (Unanimous)	1	5:00
	Isao Hirose	def.	Masumi Tozawa	Decision (Unanimous)	1	5:00

== Pancrase: Korea Hybrid Challenge ==
Pancrase: Korea Hybrid Challenge
- Date: March 11, 2007
- Venue: Korakuen Hall
- City: Tokyo, Japan

Pancrase: Korea Hybrid Challenge was an event held on March 11, 2007 at Korakuen Hall in Tokyo, Japan.

=== Results ===
Main Card
Weight class				Method	Round	Time	Notes
	Hyung Geol Lee	def.	Do Young Hong	Submission (Triangle Choke)	1	4:24
	Nam Chul Seo	def.	Byung Il Yu	Submission (Armbar)	1	2:08
	Young Jin Hwang	def.	Hyun Woo Kim	Submission (Scarf Hold Armlock)	2	4:17
	Ji Hwan Lee	vs.	Gyu Hwa Kim	Draw	2	5:00
	Seung Deuk Kwak	def.	Sung Il Son	Submission (Neck Crank)	2	0:34
	Dae Gyu Lim	def.	Doo Kwang Jeon	TKO (Doctor Stoppage)	2	0:35
	Jin Woo Han	def.	Yong Sik Kim	Submission (Flying Armbar)	1	1:18
	Nam Jin Jo	def.	Joon Il Shin	Submission (Armbar)	2	2:45
	Chang Joon Lee	def.	Young Sang Park	Submission (Scarf Hold Armlock)	1	1:07
	Dong Woo Jang	def.	Sung Chan Kang	Submission (Armbar)	1	1:56
	Young Joon Lee	def.	Joon Ho Shin	Submission (Armbar)	1	1:41

== Pancrase: Rising 3 ==
Pancrase: Rising 3
- Date: March 18, 2007
- Venue: Korakuen Hall
- City: Tokyo, Japan

Pancrase: Rising 3 was an event held on March 18, 2007 at Korakuen Hall in Tokyo, Japan.

=== Results ===
Main Card
Weight class				Method	Round	Time	Notes
	Ryo Kawamura	def.	Hiromitsu Kanehara	KO (Punches)	3	1:36
	Alavutdin Gadjiev	def.	Ichiro Kanai	TKO (Punches)	1	1:05
	Daiki Hata	def.	Kentaro Imaizumi	Decision (Majority)	2	5:00
	Eriya Matsuda	def.	Takumi Yano	KO (Knee)	1	1:30
	Yuji Hoshino	def.	Shoji Maruyama	Decision (Unanimous)	2	5:00
	Asaki Honda	vs.	Seiki Ryo	Draw	2	5:00

== Pancrase: 2007 Neo-Blood Tournament Eliminations ==
Pancrase: 2007 Neo-Blood Tournament Eliminations
- Date: March 25, 2007
- Venue: Korakuen Hall
- City: Tokyo, Japan

Pancrase: 2007 Neo-Blood Tournament Eliminations was an event held on March 25, 2007 at Korakuen Hall in Tokyo, Japan.

=== Results ===
Main Card
Weight class				Method	Round	Time	Notes
	Taku Aramaki	def.	Hiroshi Arakawa	Decision (Unanimous)	2	5:00
	Yuichi Ikari	def.	Jinzaburo Yonezawa	Decision (Unanimous)	2	5:00
	Takashi Hasegawa	def.	Yuki Yamasawa	Decision (Split)	2	5:00
	Koji Yoshimoto	def.	Yasutomo Tanaka	Decision (Unanimous)	2	5:00
	Tomoki Murayama	def.	Nobuhiro Yamauchi	TKO (Soccer Kick)	2	3:54
	Kentaro Abe	def.	Keizo Nagaya	Decision (Unanimous)	2	5:00
	Satoru Takadaya	def.	Flavio Tanaka	Decision (Unanimous)	2	5:00
	Koichiro Matsumoto	def.	Junichi Ota	Decision (Unanimous)	1	5:00
	Sho Kazama	def.	Kazutaka Omigawa	Submission (Armbar)	1	1:28
	Kentaro Abe	def.	Daisuke Komagamine	Decision (Unanimous)	1	5:00
	Keizo Nagaya	def.	Tatsuya Obitsu	Decision (Split)	1	5:00
	Flavio Tanaka	def.	Shohei Mitsuda	KO (Knee)	1	2:14
	Satoru Takadaya	def.	Hitoki Tsuti	KO (Punch)	1	0:04
	Koichiro Matsumoto	def.	Makoto Sumazaki	KO (Punch)	1	2:19
	Junichi Ota	def.	Naoki Miyamoto	Decision (Majority)	1	5:00
	Kazutaka Omigawa	def.	Yutaka Kobayashi	Submission (Ankle Lock)	1	2:54
	Sho Kazama	def.	Satoru Takahashi	Submission (Heel Hook)	1	0:20
	Shohei Mitsuda	def.	Tetsuya Yoshioka	Submission (Kimura)	1	3:31
	Flavio Tanaka	def.	Masayoshi Ichikawa	Decision (Majority)	1	5:00
	Satoru Takadaya	def.	Akihiro Ono	Submission (Armbar)	1	1:34
	Hitoki Tsuti	def.	Atsuo Hirano	Decision (Unanimous)	1	5:00

== Pancrase: Real 2007 ==
Pancrase: Real 2007
- Date: April 8, 2007
- Venue: Teruya Diamond Hall
- City: Okinawa, Japan

Pancrase: Real 2007 was an event held on April 8, 2007 at Teruya Diamond Hall in Okinawa, Japan.

=== Results ===
Main Card
Weight class				Method	Round	Time	Notes
	Mitsuhisa Sunabe	def.	Takumi Murata	Decision (Majority)	2	5:00
	Naoji Fujimoto	vs.	Tatsuya So	Draw	2	5:00
	Yuichi Miyagi	def.	Michihisa Asano	Decision (Unanimous)	2	5:00
	Masaya Takita	def.	Kenwa Kanna	Decision (Majority)	2	5:00
	Hiroshi Mochizuki	vs.	Kohei Tokeshi	Draw	2	5:00
	Yohei Sakamoto	vs.	Norihito Yagi	Draw	2	5:00
	Seigo Inoue	def.	Tadasu Tokita	Submission (Armbar)	2	4:02

== Pancrase: Rising 4 ==
Pancrase: Rising 4
- Date: April 27, 2007
- Venue: Korakuen Hall
- City: Tokyo, Japan

Pancrase: Rising 4 was an event held on April 27, 2007 at Korakuen Hall in Tokyo, Japan.

=== Results ===
Main Card
Weight class				Method	Round	Time	Notes
	Yoshiro Maeda	def.	Danny Batten	Decision (Unanimous)	3	5:00
	Brayan Rafiq	def.	Hikaru Sato	TKO (Punches)	2	2:16
	Izuru Takeuchi	def.	Daisuke Watanabe	Decision (Unanimous)	3	5:00
	Hyung Suk Choi	def.	Yukio Sakaguchi	KO (Punch)	1	1:51
	Miki Shida	def.	Manabu Inoue	Decision (Unanimous)	3	5:00
	Takuya Wada	def.	Sotaro Yamada	Decision (Unanimous)	2	5:00
	Shoji Maruyama	def.	Kenji Takeshige	TKO (Punches)	1	2:28
	Yuji Fujioka	vs.	Shingo Suzuki	Draw	2	5:00

== Pancrase: 2007 Neo-Blood Tournament Semifinals ==
Pancrase: 2007 Neo-Blood Tournament Semifinals
- Date: May 6, 2007
- Venue: Korakuen Hall
- City: Tokyo, Japan

Pancrase: 2007 Neo-Blood Tournament Semifinals was an event held on May 6, 2007 at Korakuen Hall in Tokyo, Japan.

=== Results ===
Main Card
Weight class				Method	Round	Time	Notes
Welterweight	Katsuya Inoue	def.	Fabricio Nascimento	TKO (Punches)	2	2:33	(Note: For the Pancrase Welterweight Championship.)
	José Aldo	def.	Shoji Maruyama	Decision (Unanimous)	3	5:00
	Riki Fukuda	def.	Hikaru Sato	KO (Punches)	1	1:09
	Rikuhei Fujii	def.	Tomoyoshi Iwamiya	Decision (Unanimous)	2	5:00
	Tadasuke Yoshida	def.	Satoru Takadaya	TKO (Punches)	1	3:12
	Yuichi Ikari	def.	Koichiro Matsumoto	Decision (Unanimous)	2	5:00
	Jin Suk Jung	def.	Tomoki Murayama	KO (Punch)	1	0:40
	Yukio Sakaguchi	def.	Ki Seok Choi	Submission (Rear Naked Choke)	1	0:44
	Takafumi Ito	vs.	Michael Sa Jin Kwok	Draw	2	5:00
	Akihito Hara	vs.	Seigo Inoue	Draw	2	5:00
	Yo Saito	vs.	Ryota Sasaki	Draw	2	5:00
	Takeshi Egami	vs.	Daisuke Sugishima	Draw	2	5:00
	Takuya Eizumi	vs.	Tomoaki Honda	Draw	2	5:00

== Pancrase: Rising 5 ==
Pancrase: Rising 5
- Date: May 30, 2007
- Venue: Korakuen Hall
- City: Tokyo, Japan

Pancrase: Rising 5 was an event held on May 30, 2007 at Korakuen Hall in Tokyo, Japan.

=== Results ===
Main Card
Weight class				Method	Round	Time	Notes
	Fabio Silva	def.	Ryo Kawamura	KO (Punches)	2	3:44
Heavyweight	Assuério Silva	def.	Tatsuya Mizuno	TKO (Punches)	2	2:08	(Note: For the Pancrase Heavyweight Championship.)
	Katsuya Inoue	def.	Koji Oishi	KO (Punch)	2	2:45
	Eriya Matsuda	def.	Kenji Arai	KO (Punch)	1	0:23
	Daiki Hata	def.	Jameel Massouh	KO (Punch)	2	4:50
	Ichiro Kanai	def.	Kozo Urita	TKO (Punches)	1	3:50
	Daichi Fujiwara	def.	Yuichiro Shirai	Decision (Unanimous)	2	5:00
	Michihisa Asano	def.	Yuki Yamasawa	Decision (Unanimous)	2	5:00
	Koji Yoshimoto	def.	Takashi Hasegawa	TKO (Punches)	2	3:06

== Pancrase: 2007 Neo-Blood Tournament Finals ==
Pancrase: 2007 Neo-Blood Tournament Finals
- Date: July 27, 2007
- Venue: Korakuen Hall
- City: Tokyo, Japan

Pancrase: 2007 Neo-Blood Tournament Finals was an event held on July 27, 2007 at Korakuen Hall in Tokyo, Japan.

=== Results ===
Main Card
Weight class				Method	Round	Time	Notes
	Katsuya Inoue	def.	Fabricio Nascimento	TKO (Punches)	2	2:33
	José Aldo	def.	Shoji Maruyama	Decision (Unanimous)	3	5:00
	Riki Fukuda	def.	Hikaru Sato	KO (Punches)	1	1:09
	Rikuhei Fujii	def.	Tomoyoshi Iwamiya	Decision (Unanimous)	2	5:00
	Tadasuke Yoshida	def.	Satoru Takadaya	TKO (Punches)	1	3:12
	Yuichi Ikari	def.	Koichiro Matsumoto	Decision (Unanimous)	2	5:00
	Jin Suk Jung	def.	Tomoki Murayama	KO (Punch)	1	0:40
	Yukio Sakaguchi	def.	Ki Seok Choi	Submission (Rear Naked Choke)	1	0:44
	Takafumi Ito	vs.	Michael Sa Jin Kwok	Draw	2	5:00
	Akihito Hara	vs.	Seigo Inoue	Draw	2	5:00
	Yo Saito	vs.	Ryota Sasaki	Draw	2	5:00
	Takeshi Egami	vs.	Daisuke Sugishima	Draw	2	5:00
	Takuya Eizumi	vs.	Tomoaki Honda	Draw	2	5:00

== Pancrase: Rising 6 ==
Pancrase: Rising 6
- Date: September 5, 2007
- Venue: Korakuen Hall
- City: Tokyo, Japan

Pancrase: Rising 6 was an event held on September 5, 2007 at Korakuen Hall in Tokyo, Japan.

=== Results ===
Main Card
Weight class				Method	Round	Time	Notes
	Satoru Kitaoka	def.	Jason Palacios	Decision (Split)	3	5:00
	Yoshiro Maeda	def.	Johnny Frachey	TKO (Kicks and Punches)	1	3:38
	Izuru Takeuchi	def.	Brayan Rafiq	Decision (Unanimous)	3	5:00
	Ryo Kawamura	def.	Jaime Fletcher	KO (Soccer Kick)	1	1:36
	Yuji Hoshino	def.	Eriya Matsuda	Submission (Achilles Lock)	1	0:28
	Koji Yoshimoto	vs.	Mitsuhisa Sunabe	Draw (Majority)	3	5:00
	Alavutdin Gadjiev	def.	Daisuke Watanabe	Technical Decision (Majority)	2	0:32
	Shinsuke Shoji	def.	Flavio Tanaka	TKO (Leg Injury)	2	2:59

== Pancrase: Rising 7 ==
Pancrase: Rising 7
- Date: September 30, 2007
- Venue: Korakuen Hall
- City: Tokyo, Japan

Pancrase: Rising 7 was an event held on September 30, 2007 at Korakuen Hall in Tokyo, Japan.

=== Results ===
Main Card
Weight class				Method	Round	Time	Notes
	Daichi Fujiwara	def.	Mitsuhisa Sunabe	KO (Head Kick)	2	0:09
	Naoji Fujimoto	def.	Nobuhiro Yamauchi	Decision (Unanimous)	2	5:00
	Yu Shiori	def.	Satoru Takadaya	Submission (Rear-Naked Choke)	1	4:04
	Masahiro Toryu	def.	Noriyuki Kitaura	Decision (Unanimous)	2	5:00
	Kiichi Kunimoto	def.	Yuta Nakamura	TKO (Punches)	1	3:27
	Takashi Hasegawa	vs.	Kenta Nakamura	Draw	2	5:00
	Asuka Ito	def.	Kinuka Sasaki	Decision (Majority)	3	3:00
	Yosuke Habu	vs.	Yohei Sakamoto	Draw	2	5:00
	Motonobu Tezuka	vs.	Yuki Uejima	Draw	2	5:00
	Kenji Ezaki	def.	Sho Nishida	TKO (Punches)	2	1:52

== Pancrase: Rising 8 ==
Pancrase: Rising 8
- Date: October 14, 2007
- Venue: Korakuen Hall
- City: Tokyo, Japan

Pancrase: Rising 8 was an event held on October 14, 2007 at Korakuen Hall in Tokyo, Japan.

=== Results ===
Main Card
Weight class				Method	Round	Time	Notes
	Yuki Kondo	def.	Yuji Sakuragi	Decision (Unanimous)	3	5:00
	Manabu Inoue	def.	Jin Suk Jung	Submission (Arm-Triangle Choke)	2	1:47
	Takuya Wada	vs.	Hyung Kwang Kim	No Contest	2	1:40
	Hikaru Sato	def.	Kentaro Abe	Submission (Rear-Naked Choke)	2	2:27
	Kenji Arai	def.	Takaichi Hirayama	Decision (Majority)	2	5:00
	Asaki Honda	def.	Yukio Sakaguchi	Submission (Heel Hook)	1	0:52
	Michihisa Asano	def.	Tatsuya So	TKO (Punches)	1	0:30
	Hayato Shimizu	def.	Yuki Yamasawa	Decision (Majority)	2	5:00
	Tomoaki Honda	def.	Takeshi Egami	Submission (Triangle Choke)	1	3:56
	Yo Saito	def.	Isao Hirose	Decision (Unanimous)	2	5:00
	Shoko Sato	def.	Takuya Eizumi	Decision (Split)	2	5:00
	Ryota Sasaki	def.	Ichiro Kudo	Decision (Unanimous)	2	5:00

== Pancrase: Hybrid Bout in Utsunomiya 3 ==
Pancrase: Hybrid Bout in Utsunomiya 3
- Date: October 27, 2007
- Venue: Korakuen Hall
- City: Tokyo, Japan

Pancrase: Hybrid Bout in Utsunomiya 3 was an event held on October 27, 2007 at Korakuen Hall in Tokyo, Japan.

=== Results ===
Main Card
Weight class				Method	Round	Time	Notes
	Hiromi Akutsu	def.	Koji Nohara	Submission (Rear-Naked Choke)	1	3:29
	Keinosuke Yoshinaga	def.	Yoshio Kawabata	Submission (Rear-Naked Choke)	1	1:43
	Hisato Izawa	def.	Kazuya Kumakura	Submission (Keylock)	1	2:20
	Kazuhiko Inomata	def.	Tsugihito Hase	Submission (Triangle Armbar)	1	3:00
	Kosuke Sakai	def.	Yuji Shiotani	Submission (Rear-Naked Choke)	1	2:03
	Kazuya Otake	def.	Kazuhito Yoshima	Decision (Split)	1	4:00
	Paulo Yoshiaki Muraoka	vs.	Yoshinori Kawada	Draw	1	4:00
	Kiyotaka Shimizu	def.	Atsushi Kawakami	Submission (Rear-Naked Choke)	1	3:35
	Tomohiko Sakata	def.	Makoto Ehara	Submission (Armbar)	1	1:59
	Takanori Saito	def.	Shinji Sunaga	TKO (Punch)	1	1:36
	Ryosuke Shibuya	def.	Kazuma Murakoshi	KO (Punch)	1	1:04
	Minechika Matsumoto	def.	Seiwa Kaneda	Decision (Majority)	1	4:00
	Yoichi Komori	def.	Fujio Yanagawa	TKO (Punches)	1	3:04
	Masanori Narita	def.	Takemori Ishibashi	TKO (Punches)	1	0:44
	Tetsuya Ishikawa	def.	Kosuke Sakai	Decision (Unanimous)	1	4:00
	Takahiro Moriizumi	def.	Shuuichi Shibue	TKO (Head Kick)	1	0:28
	Masaski Yamaji	def.	Junsei Hitomi	Submission (Armbar)	1	1:29
	Kosei Shibuya	def.	Yoshihito Gokita	Submission (Armbar)	1	2:02
	Yumitsu Mimura	def.	Hirosuke Kuboshima	Submission (Kimura)	1	2:29
	Shunji Saito	def.	Toru Arai	Decision (Majority)	1	4:00
	Kazuma Murakoshi	def.	Shinichi Ishikawa	TKO (Punches)	1	3:22

== Pancrase: Rising 9 ==
Pancrase: Rising 9
- Date: November 28, 2007
- Venue: Korakuen Hall
- City: Tokyo, Japan

Pancrase: Rising 9 was an event held on November 28, 2007 at Korakuen Hall in Tokyo, Japan.

=== Results ===
Main Card
Weight class				Method	Round	Time	Notes
Middleweight	Izuru Takeuchi	def.	Yuichi Nakanishi (c)	Decision (Unanimous)	3	5:00	(Note: For the Pancrase Middleweight Championship.)
	Marlon Sandro	def.	Daiki Hata	Decision (Unanimous)	3	5:00
	Tatsuya Mizuno	def.	Masayuki Kono	TKO (Punches)	1	3:28
	Michihisa Asano	def.	Tomoki Murayama	Decision (Unanimous)	2	5:00
	Takuya Wada	def.	Seiki Ryo	Decision (Unanimous)	2	5:00
	Shinsuke Shoji	def.	Wataru Takahashi	KO (Punches)	1	0:52
	Yo Saito	def.	Tomoaki Honda	Submission (Rear-Naked Choke)	1	3:51
	Shoko Sato	def.	Ryota Sasaki	Decision (Majority)	2	5:00
	Akihiro Ono	def.	Juntaro Ami	TKO (Punches)	1	3:13
	Taketoshi Suzuki	def.	Akimitsu Tsuchiya	TKO (Punches)	1	0:26
	Koji Obata	def.	Kenichi Ogura	Submission (Arm-Triangle Choke)	1	2:23

== Pancrase: 2007 Korea Neo-Blood Tournament ==
Pancrase: 2007 Korea Neo-Blood Tournament
- Date: December 16, 2007
- Venue: Korakuen Hall
- City: Tokyo, Japan

Pancrase: 2007 Korea Neo-Blood Tournament was an event held on December 16, 2007 at Korakuen Hall in Tokyo, Japan.

=== Results ===
Main Card
Weight class				Method	Round	Time	Notes
	Il Gyu Park	def.	Nam Chul Seo	TKO (Punches)	1	2:03
	Kyu Jin Choi	def.	Eun Ho Chae	Decision (Unanimous)	2	5:00
	Seung Ho Yang	def.	Kwang Hoon Lee	TKO (Corner Stoppage)	2	3:39
	Chan Sung Jung	def.	Hyung Geol Lee	TKO (Punches)	1	3:27
	Il Gyu Park	def.	Ho Yoon Chung	Decision (Unanimous)	2	5:00
	Nam Chul Seo	def.	Brian Girolametto	Submission (Armbar)	1	0:36
	Eun Ho Chae	def.	Young Jun Lee	Submission (Armbar)	2	2:50
	Kyu Jin Choi	def.	Dong Woo Jang	Decision (Split)	2	5:00
	Kwang Hoon Lee	def.	Seung Deuk Kwak	KO (Punch)	1	2:47
	Seung Ho Yang	def.	Young Wook Kim	Decision (Unanimous)	2	5:00
	Hyung Geol Lee	def.	Young Jin Hwang	Submission (Rear-Naked Choke)	1	2:07
	Chan Sung Jung	def.	In Seok Yoo	Submission (Rear-Naked Choke)	1	2:34

== Pancrase: Rising 10 ==
Pancrase: Rising 10
- Date: December 22, 2007
- Venue: Korakuen Hall
- City: Tokyo, Japan

Pancrase: Rising 10 was an event held on December 22, 2007 at Korakuen Hall in Tokyo, Japan.

=== Results ===
Main Card
Weight class				Method	Round	Time	Notes
	Keiichiro Yamamiya	def.	Ryo Kawamura	Decision (Unanimous)	3	5:00
	Shoji Maruyama	def.	Takafumi Ito	Decision (Unanimous)	3	5:00
	Kenji Arai	def.	Michael Sa Jin Kwok	Submission (Armbar)	1	1:17
	Alavutdin Gadjiev	def.	Masahiro Toryu	TKO (Punches)	1	0:57
	Miki Shida	def.	Jameel Massouh	Decision (Unanimous)	2	5:00
	Yuichi Ikari	def.	Takumi Yano	TKO (Punches)	1	1:51
	Tatsuya So	def.	Hayato Shimizu	Submission (Guillotine Choke)	2	3:30

== See also ==
- Pancrase
- List of Pancrase champions
- List of Pancrase events
