= Izuru Takeuchi =

Japanese mixed martial arts fighter

- Born: August 5, 1974; Okayama, Japan
- Nationality: Japanese
- Height: 5 ft 11 in (1.80 m)
- Weight: 181 lb (82 kg; 12.9 st)
- Division: Middleweight; Lightweight
- Style: Judo, Sambo, Wrestling
- Team: SK Absolute
- Rank: 3rd Dan Black Belt in Judo

Mixed martial arts record
- Total: 43
- Wins: 25
- By knockout: 3
- By submission: 3
- By decision: 19
- Losses: 11
- By knockout: 3
- By submission: 2
- By decision: 6
- Draws: 7

Other information
- Mixed martial arts record from Sherdog

Izuru Takeuchi (竹内 出, Takeuchi Izuru; born August 5, 1974) is a retired Japanese mixed martial artist who competed in the middleweight division. He is a veteran of both the Pancrase and Shooto organizations, and is the former Middleweight King of Pancrase. Outside of mixed martial arts, Takeuchi has competed in numerous grappling tournaments, most notably in the All-Japan Combat Wrestling Championships held by the National Amateur Combat Wrestling Association.

== Championships and accomplishments ==
=== Grappling ===
- A.D.C.C. Japan
  - 2000 Abu Dhabi Japan Elimination Tournament: -87 kg Champion
- All Japan Combat Wrestling
  - 2002 All Japan Combat Wrestling Championships: -85 kg Champion
  - 2004 All Japan Combat Wrestling Championships: -85 kg Champion
- Combat Sambo World Championships
  - 2005 Combat Sambo World Championships: 3rd place, -82 kg weight division

=== Mixed Martial Arts ===
- Pancrase
  - Middleweight King of Pancrase (One time)

== Mixed martial arts record ==
Professional record breakdown
43 matches	25 wins	11 losses
By knockout	3	3
By submission	3	2
By decision	19	6
Draws	7	

Res.	Record	Opponent	Method	Event	Date	Round	Time	Location	Notes
Loss	25–11–7	Ichiro Kanai	Decision (majority)	Pancrase: Changing Tour 8	December 6, 2009	3	5:00	Tokyo, Japan	Lost the Pancrase Middleweight Championship.
Draw	25–10–7	Takenori Sato	Draw	Pancrase: Changing Tour 4	August 8, 2009	3	5:00	Tokyo, Japan	
Loss	25–10–6	Joe Doerksen	TKO (punches)	World Victory Road Presents: Sengoku 6	November 1, 2008	3	4:13	Saitama, Japan	Middleweight Grand Prix Reserve bout.
Win	25–9–6	Junior Santos	Submission (heel hook)	Pancrase: Shining 5	June 1, 2008	1	4:49	Tokyo, Japan	
Win	24–9–6	Hiromitsu Kanehara	Decision (unanimous)	Pancrase: Shining 2	March 26, 2008	3	5:00	Tokyo, Japan	
Win	23–9–6	Yuichi Nakanishi	Decision (unanimous)	Pancrase: Rising 9	November 28, 2007	3	5:00	Tokyo, Japan	Won the Pancrase Middleweight Championship.
Win	22–9–6	Bryan Rafiq	Decision (unanimous)	Pancrase: Rising 6	September 5, 2007	3	5:00	Tokyo, Japan	
Win	21–9–6	Daisuke Watanabe	Decision (unanimous)	Pancrase: Rising 4	April 27, 2007	3	5:00	Tokyo, Japan	
Loss	20–9–6	Kyacey Uscola	Decision (unanimous)	Bodog Fight: Costa Rica Combat	February 18, 2007	3	5:00	Costa Rica	
Loss	20–8–6	Yuichi Nakanishi	Decision (split)	Pancrase: Blow 10	December 2, 2006	3	5:00	Tokyo, Japan	For the vacant Pancrase Middleweight Championship.
Win	20–7–6	Hikaru Sato	Decision (unanimous)	Pancrase: Blow 6	August 27, 2006	3	5:00	Yokohama, Japan	
Loss	19–7–6	Yushin Okami	TKO (punches)	Greatest Common Multiple: D.O.G. 6	June 11, 2006	1	3:39	Tokyo, Japan	
Win	19–6–6	Azat Askerov	Decision (unanimous)	Pancrase: Blow 4	May 2, 2006	2	5:00	Tokyo, Japan	
Win	18–6–6	Myung Ho Bae	TKO (punches)	MARS	February 4, 2006	1	3:46	Tokyo, Japan	
Win	17–6–6	Kozo Urita	Decision (unanimous)	Pancrase: Spiral 9	November 4, 2005	2	5:00	Tokyo, Japan	Return to Middleweight.
Win	16–6–6	Hiromitsu Miura	TKO (punches)	K-1 Hero's 2	July 6, 2005	2	2:35	Tokyo, Japan	Lightweight debut.
Loss	15–6–6	Nate Marquardt	Technical Submission (rear-naked choke)	Pancrase: Spiral 4	May 1, 2005	3	2:19	Yokohama, Japan	For the Pancrase Middleweight Championship.
Win	15–5–6	Yuji Hisamatsu	Decision (unanimous)	Pancrase: Spiral 1	February 4, 2005	3	5:00	Tokyo, Japan	
Win	14–5–6	Seiki Ryo	TKO (shoulder injury)	Pancrase: Brave 11	November 26, 2004	1	5:00	Tokyo, Japan	
Win	13–5–6	Mitsuhiro Ito	Submission (armlock)	ARANAMI: Pre.Rough Sea	October 1, 2004	2	2:35	Niigata, Japan	
Draw	12–5–6	Osami Shibuya	Draw (unanimous)	Pancrase: Brave 6	June 22, 2004	3	5:00	Tokyo, Japan	
Win	12–5–5	Kiuma Kunioku	Decision (majority)	Pancrase: Brave 4	April 23, 2004	3	5:00	Tokyo, Japan	
Draw	11–5–5	Marcel Ferreira	Draw	Absolute Fighting Championships 7	February 27, 2004	3	5:00	Fort Lauderdale, Florida, United States	
Draw	11–5–4	Eiji Ishikawa	Draw	Pancrase: Hybrid 9	October 31, 2003	3	5:00	Tokyo, Japan	
Win	11–5–3	Kosei Kubota	Decision (unanimous)	Pancrase: Hybrid 6	June 7, 2003	3	5:00	Tokyo, Japan	
Loss	10–5–3	Nate Marquardt	KO (punches)	Pancrase: Hybrid 3	March 8, 2003	1	1:29	Tokyo, Japan	For the Pancrase Middleweight Championship.
Win	10–4–3	Chris Lytle	Decision (majority)	Pancrase: Spirit 9	December 21, 2002	3	5:00	Tokyo, Japan	
Win	9–4–3	Nate Marquardt	Decision (unanimous)	Pancrase: Spirit 7	October 29, 2002	3	5:00	Tokyo, Japan	
Loss	8–4–3	Dustin Denes	Decision (Unanimous)	HOOKnSHOOT: New Wind	September 7, 2002	3	5:00	Evansville, Indiana, United States	
Win	8–3–3	Ronald Jhun	Decision (majority)	Shooto: Treasure Hunt 1	January 12, 2002	3	5:00	Tokyo, Japan	
Draw	7–3–3	Martijn de Jong	Draw	Shooto: To The Top 10	November 25, 2001	3	5:00	Tokyo, Japan	
Win	7–3–2	Martijn de Jong	Decision (split)	Shooto: To The Top 6	July 6, 2001	3	5:00	Tokyo, Japan	
Loss	6–3–2	Patrick Fortrie	Decision	Golden Trophy 2000	March 18, 2000	N/A	N/A	Orléans, France	
Win	6–2–2	Frederique Ferrera	Submission (armbar)	Golden Trophy 2000	March 18, 2000	N/A	N/A	Orléans, France	
Win	5–2–2	Florentim Amorim	Decision	Golden Trophy 2000	March 18, 2000	N/A	N/A	Orléans, France	
Win	4–2–2	Shiko Yamashita	Decision (unanimous)	Shooto: R.E.A.D. 1	January 14, 2000	2	5:00	Tokyo, Japan	
Draw	3–2–2	Ryuta Sakurai	Decision (unanimous)	Shooto: Gateway to the Extremes	November 4, 1999	2	5:00	Tokyo, Japan	
Win	3–2–1	Ahmed Lazizi	Decision (unanimous)	Shooto: 10th Anniversary Event	May 29, 1999	2	5:00	Yokohama, Japan	
Win	2–2–1	Nobuhiro Tsurumaki	Decision (unanimous)	Shooto: Gig '99	April 9, 1999	2	5:00	Tokyo, Japan	
Draw	1–2–1	Ryuta Sakurai	Draw	Shooto: Las Grandes Viajes 6	November 27, 1998	2	5:00	Tokyo, Japan	
Loss	1–2	Yuki Sasaki	Decision (unanimous)	Shooto: Gig '98 2nd	July 18, 1998	2	5:00	Tokyo, Japan	
Loss	1–1	Masanori Suda	Submission (toe hold)	Lumax Cup: Tournament of J '97 Middleweight Tournament	December 20, 1997	1	1:53	Japan	
Win	1–0	Motohiko Sugiyama	Decision (unanimous)	Lumax Cup: Tournament of J '97 Middleweight Tournament	December 20, 1997	2	3:00	Japan	

== See also ==
- List of male mixed martial artists
- List of Pancrase champions
