= Hikaru Sato =

Japanese professional wrestler and mixed martial artist

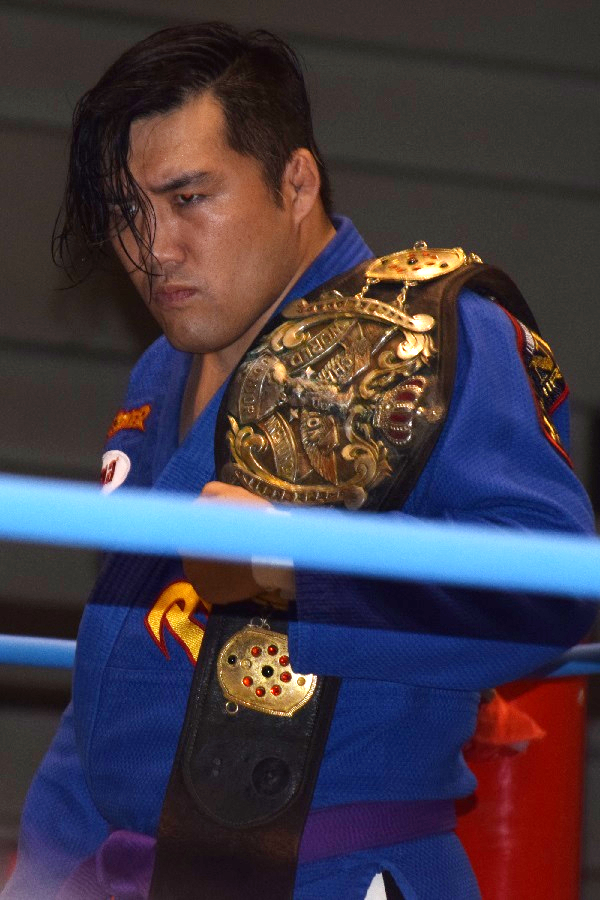
- Sato in 2017
- Born: Hiroaki Sato; July 8, 1980 (age 46); Okayama, Okayama, Japan
- Native name: 佐藤光留
- Nationality: Japanese
- Height: 1.72 m (5 ft 8 in)
- Weight: 79 kg (174 lb; 12.4 st)
- Division: Super Heavyweight; Heavyweight; Light Heavyweight; Middleweight; Lightweight
- Fighting out of: Okayama, Okayama, Japan
- Team: Pancrase-ism; Pancrase Mission
- Years active: 2000–present

Mixed martial arts record
- Total: 54
- Wins: 24
- By knockout: 3
- By submission: 12
- By decision: 9
- Losses: 26
- By knockout: 11
- By submission: 4
- By decision: 11
- Draws: 4

Other information
- Website: ameblo.jp/sassato-hikkoshi/
- Mixed martial arts record from Sherdog
- Last updated on: February 5, 2017

Hiroaki Sato (佐藤 弘明, Satō Hiroaki; born July 8, 1980) is a Japanese professional wrestler and mixed martial artist, better known by the ring name Hikaru Sato (佐藤 光留, Satō Hikaru). Sato started his MMA career in February 2000, fighting for Pancrase Hybrid Wrestling. During the next eight years, Sato fought, on average, five times a year, compiling a record of 18 wins, 19 losses and four draws, which included fights against the likes of Keiichiro Yamamiya, Nathan Marquardt, Ryo Chonan and Yushin Okami.

In May 2008, Sato transitioned into the world of professional wrestling, when he was signed by the Dramatic Dream Team (DDT) promotion. He has since had ten MMA fights. In November 2010, Sato first became a triple crown trios champion with Michael Nakazawa and Tomomitsu Matsunaga and then also won DDT's top singles title, the KO-D Openweight Championship. Sato remained affiliated with DDT until January 2014. He is currently working for the All Japan Pro Wrestling promotion, where he is a former two-time World Junior Heavyweight Champion and four-time All Asia Tag Team Champion, while also being a five-time winner of the Jr. Tag Battle of Glory tournament.

== Mixed martial arts career ==
Sato, with a high school background in amateur wrestling, started training mixed martial arts with Pancrase Hybrid Wrestling in June 1999. He made his fighting debut as a middleweight on February 27, 2000, losing to Daisuke Watanabe with a unanimous decision. He picked up his first win in his second fight on April 30, 2000, by defeating American Michael Sa Jin Kwok with an armbar in the first round. Early on, Sato became known for his eccentric personality, which included him wearing cat ears and dressing up as a maid while walking to the ring for his fights. In 2001, Sato fought three high-profile fights, losing to American King of Pancrase Middleweight Champion Nathan Marquardt via submission on March 31, defeating Ryo Chonan via unanimous decision in Chonan's professional debut on May 5 and losing to King of Pancrase Light Heavyweight Champion Keiichiro Yamamiya via unanimous decision on August 30. On January 18, 2004, Sato defeated Daisuke Nakamura to win Greatest Common Multiple's (GMC) 2004 Demolition Middleweight 4Men Tournament. After his win, Sato proceeded to challenge King of Pancrase Openweight Champion Josh Barnett to a match. During his early years in Pancrase, Sato lost more fights than he won. On February 28, 2007, Sato defeated Rikuhei Fujii and, as a result, for the first time in his career, Sato's number of wins exceeded his number of losses, with a record of 17 wins, 16 losses and 3 draws. On December 22, 2007, Sato finally got into a ring with Josh Barnett, however, the match was contested under catch wrestling rules. Barnett won the match, submitting Sato at the end of the first round. The following year, Sato transitioned into the world of professional wrestling, which led to a drop in his number of fights per year. His most recent fight took place on February 5, 2017, when he defeated Johnathan Ivey via technical knockout, giving him a record of 24 wins, 23 losses and 4 draws.

== Professional wrestling career ==
Hikaru Sato
Personal information
- Born: Hiroaki Sato; July 8, 1980 (age 46) Okayama, Okayama

Professional wrestling career
- Ring name(s): Baba; Hentaiō; Hikaru Sato
- Billed height: 1.72 m (5 ft 7 1/2 in)
- Billed weight: 90 kg (200 lb)
- Trained by: Minoru Suzuki
- Debut: February 27, 2000

In March 2008, Sato began training for a career in professional wrestling under Pancrase founder Minoru Suzuki. He made his debut for the Dramatic Dream Team (DDT) promotion on May 24, 2008, defeating Shuji Ishikawa in the main event of a "Hard Hit" event, DDT's project, which combines elements of mixed martial arts and professional wrestling to create a more realistic looking, but still worked, style of professional wrestling. As a professional wrestler, Sato continued wearing his maid dresses and occasionally even wrestled in them. During the next months, Sato made appearances for Osaka Pro Wrestling and Minoru Suzuki-promoted independent events, before he began working regularly for DDT the following August, defeating Michael Nakazawa in his return match, contested under "Hard Hit" rules. Afterwards, Sato and Nakazawa formed a regular partnership with each other. On February 22, 2009, Sato defeated Tanomusaku Toba and Yasu Urano in a three-way match to earn his first shot at DDT's top title, the KO-D Openweight Championship. Sato received his title opportunity on March 15, but was unable to dethrone the defending champion, Sanshiro Takagi. After also failing to capture the DDT Extreme Division Championship on September 27, Sato formed the Belt Hunter×Hunter stable with Danshoku Dino, Keisuke Ishii, Masa Takanashi and Tigers Mask, which led to him winning his first professional wrestling title, when he, Dino and Takanashi defeated the Italian Four Horsemen (Antonio Honda, Francesco Togo and Piza Michinoku) for the UWA World Trios Championship on November 29. At the following event on December 6, Sato and Takanashi unsuccessfully challenged Kudo and Yasu Urano for the KO-D Tag Team Championship. On January 24, 2010, Sato, Dino and Takanashi lost the UWA World Trios Championship to Tokyo Gurentai (Fujita, Mazada and Nosawa Rongai). Sato would regain the title from Tokyo Gurentai on June 13, this time teaming with Keisuke Ishii and Yoshihiko, a blow up doll. However, his second reign with the title ended just a month later, when the team was defeated by The Great Kojika, Mr. #6 and Riho in a three-way match, which also included the team of Antonio Honda, Kudo and Yasu Urano and was also contested for the DDT Jiyūgaoka Six-Person Tag Team and DDT Nihonkai Six-Man Tag Team Championships. During the late summer of 2010, Sato took part in All Japan Pro Wrestling's (AJPW) Junior League and Pro Wrestling Zero1's Tenka-Ichi Junior Tournament, failing to reach the finals in both of them.

On November 3, 2010, Sato reunited with Michael Nakazawa and Tomomitsu Matsunaga as the Shit Heart♥Foundation to defeat The Great Kojika, Mr. #6 and Riho for the DDT Jiyūgaoka Six-Person Tag Team, DDT Nihonkai Six-Man Tag Team and UWA World Trios Championships. Just nine days later, Sato defeated Harashima to also win the KO-D Openweight Championship. However, Sato's reign at the top of DDT lasted only fourteen days, before he was defeated by Dick Togo. Before the end of the year, on December 26, Sato, Nakazawa and Matsunaga lost the UWA World Trios Championship to Disaster-Box (Harashima, Toru Owashi and Yukihiro Abe). Following the loss, Soma Takao took over the leadership of Shit Heart♥Foundation, kicking Sato out of the group in the process. This built to a Hair vs. Hair match on February 27, 2011, where Takao defeated Sato, who was, as a result, shaved bald. Two months later, Sato returned to AJPW to take part in the 2011 Junior Tag League, where he teamed with Kikutaro, with the two winning two out of their six matches in the tournament. The following September, Sato took part in his second AJPW Junior League, again failing to advance from his block. On September 30, Sato won the second annual DDT48 general election and was thus named the number one contender to the KO-D Openweight Championship; he would, however, go on to fail in his title challenge against Kudo on October 23. The following month, Sato was placed in charge of the newly relaunched Hard Hit project, which led to him introducing new rules to the project on March 12, 2012, making it a more distinct sub-brand of DDT. The following month, Sato entered AJPW's 2012 Junior Tag League teaming with Hiroshi Yamato. After two wins, a draw and a loss, Sato and Yamato failed to advance to the finals, after being defeated by Bushi and Sushi on the final day of the tournament. On May 5, Sato made his debut for women's wrestling promotion Ice Ribbon, where he formed a comedic tag team with Riho, built around his infatuation over his fourteen-year-old tag team partner. At Golden Ribbon, Sato and Riho entered the annual Go! Go! Golden Mixed Tag Tournament, where they defeated Miyako Matsumoto and Mr. #6 in their first round match, before losing to Maki Narumiya and Masamune in the semifinals of the tournament. On July 16, Sato once again returned to AJPW to take part in the 2012 Junior Hyper League. After two wins, one draw and two losses, Sato failed to advance from his round-robin block. On August 26, Sato challenged Hiroshi Yamato to a match for his World Junior Heavyweight Championship, after he had successfully defended the title against Minoru Tanaka. Yamato accepted the challenge and the title match was made official the following day. Sato received his title shot on September 23, but was defeated by Yamato. In late 2012, Sato once again began teaming with Michael Nakazawa and Tomomitsu Matsunaga in DDT, forming a stable that would in January 2013 be named "3CC Co., Ltd."

On January 3, 2013, Sato made another appearance for AJPW, when he and Yamato came together to challenge the Junior Stars of Koji Kanemoto and Minoru Tanaka to a match for the All Asia Tag Team Championship. On January 26, the team, billed as "Jounetsu Hentai Baka", defeated the Junior Stars to win the All Asia Tag Team Championship, Sato's first title in All Japan. After only a fifteen-day reign, Sato and Yamato lost the title back to Kanemoto and Tanaka on February 10. On February 24, Sato produced the first Hard Hit event in eight months, working in the main event, where he faced Yuji Sakuragi, who had defeated him in a Pancrase fight in January 2006. The Hard Hit match ended with Sato being declared the winner after just 38 seconds, when he was unable to continue after having his nose accidentally broken by Sakuragi. From March 30 to April 7, Sato and Hiroshi Yamato took part in AJPW's 2013 Junior Hyper Tag League, where they made it all the way to the finals, before losing to Burning (Atsushi Aoki and Kotaro Suzuki), whom they had defeated in their opening match of the tournament. Back in DDT, Sato and fellow mixed martial artist Yukio Sakaguchi defeated Harashima and Yasu Urano on May 3 to win the KO-D Tag Team Championship for the first time. Sato followed that up nine days later by defeating Harashima to become the number one contender to the KO-D Openweight Championship. Sato then went on to fail in his title challenge against Shigehiro Irie on May 26. On June 2, Sato and Sakaguchi made their first successful defense of the KO-D Tag Team Championship against Monster Army representatives Hoshitango and Yuji Hino. Sato's and Sakaguchi's second successful title defense took place on June 14, when they defeated former champions Kudo and Yasu Urano. Post-match Sato, who had earlier mentioned that he wanted to defend the title against younger wrestlers, nominated Akito and Konosuke Takeshita as their next challengers. On June 23, Sato and Sakaguchi defeated Akito and Takeshita for their third successful title defense. On June 30, Sato returned to AJPW to take part in the farewell match of Hiroshi Yamato, who had announced his resignation from the promotion following Nobuo Shiraishi becoming its new president. After defeating Yamato and Kazushi Miyamoto in a three-way match, Sato announced that unlike his former Jounetsu Hentai Baka partner, he would continue to make appearances for the Shiraishi-run All Japan. When All Japan relaunched the following month, Sato worked the entire first Summer Action Series tour with the promotion. On July 28, the final day of the tour, Sato submitted World Junior Heavyweight Champion Yoshinobu Kanemaru in a tag team match, where he and Kenso faced Kanemaru and Kotaro Suzuki, and afterwards challenged him to a title match. Back in DDT, Sato and Sakaguchi lost the KO-D Tag Team Championship to Isami Kodaka and Yuko Miyamoto on August 18, during Ryōgoku Peter Pan 2013, DDT's biggest event of the year. On August 25, Sato failed in his title challenge against World Junior Heavyweight Champion Yoshinobu Kanemaru.

On January 17, 2014, DDT announced that the promotion and Sato had decided not to renew their contract with each other. Sato wrestled his final match under his old DDT contract on January 26, when he and Sanshiro Takagi defeated Akito and Yukio Sakaguchi in a tag team match. Afterwards, Sato began working for DDT's sub-promotion Union Pro Wrestling, while also producing occasional Hard Hit events for the promotion. Sato also continued working for AJPW, where, on February 16, Suwama accepted Sato's direct appeal and allowed him to join himself and Joe Doering, turning their tag team named Evolution into a stable. After starting a storyline, where he began disrespecting Union Pro, Sato won the promotion's top title, the Union Max Championship, by defeating Isami Kodaka on May 18. He made his first successful title defense on June 19 against Hiroshi Fukuda. On July 7, Sato and Masaaki Mochizuki defeated Hub and Mazada, and Dr. Wagner Jr. and Nosawa Rongai in a three-way elimination match to win Tokyo Gurentai's Tokyo Intercontinental Tag Team Championship. On July 27, Sato received another shot at AJPW's World Junior Heavyweight Championship, but was defeated by the defending champion, Atsushi Aoki, who afterwards agreed to join Sato in Evolution. On August 31, Sato made his second successful defense of the Union Max Championship by wrestling Shuji Ishikawa to a thirty-minute time limit draw. His third successful defense took place on September 15, when he defeated Daichi Kazato. On October 22, Sato and Atsushi Aoki won the 2014 Jr. Tag Battle of Glory, defeating Último Dragón and Yoshinobu Kanemaru in the finals. Directly following their win, Sato and Aoki agreed to a World Junior Heavyweight Championship match to determine the top junior heavyweight in the company. The match took place on October 29 and saw Aoki defeat Sato to retain his title. As a result of winning the Jr. Tag Battle of Glory, Sato and Aoki earned a spot in the year-end World's Strongest Tag Determination League, where, as the only junior heavyweight team, they finished with a record of two wins, one draw and four losses. On December 17, Sato lost the Union Max Championship to Fuma in his third title defense. On March 14, 2015, Sato received his first non-junior title shot in AJPW, when he unsuccessfully challenged Kenso for the Gaora TV Championship.

On June 4, 2015, it was announced that Sato had obtained all rights to the Hard Hit project, which was now becoming independent of DDT. On June 21, Sato received another shot at the World Junior Heavyweight Championship, but was again defeated by the defending champion, Kotaro Suzuki. On July 15, Sato and Mochizuki lost the Tokyo Intercontinental Tag Team Championship to Chikara and Mitsuo Momota. On October 23, Sato and Atsushi Aoki, now billed collectively as "Hentai Jieitai" ("Pervert Self-Defense Forces"), won their second Jr. Tag Battle of Glory in a row by winning the round-robin tournament with a record of three wins and one loss. In February 2016, Sato made it to the finals of the 2016 Jr. Battle of Glory, where he was defeated by Evolution stablemate Atsushi Aoki. On April 4, Sato regained the Tokyo Intercontinental Tag Team Championship, when he and fellow Pancrase representative Ryo Kawamura defeated Kiku-san Hansen and Stan Ichikawa. On June 19, Sato defeated Atsushi Aoki to win the World Junior Heavyweight Championship for the first time. Sato made his first successful title defense on July 14 against Tatsuhito Takaiwa. On July 24, Sato became a double champion, when he and Atsushi Aoki defeated Isami Kodaka and Yuko Miyamoto at a Big Japan Pro Wrestling (BJW) event to win the All Asia Tag Team Championship. On August 28, Sato returned to DDT to take part in Ryōgoku Peter Pan 2016, where he lost the World Junior Heavyweight Championship to Soma Takao in his second defense. On November 17, Sato and Aoki won their third Jr. Tag Battle of Glory in a row by defeating Soma Takao and Yuma Aoyagi in a playoff match. On November 27, Sato and Aoki lost the All Asia Tag Team Championship to veteran wrestlers Atsushi Onita and Masanobu Fuchi, who became the 100th champions in the title's history.

On April 28, 2017, Sato defeated Keisuke Ishii to win the World Junior Heavyweight Championship for the second time. On June 20, Sato became a double champion, when he and Aoki defeated Onita and Fuchi to regain the All Asia Tag Team Championship. On July 30, Sato lost the World Junior Heavyweight Championship to Tajiri in his fifth defense. Earlier in July, Sato began campaigning for a grappling match with Evolution leader Suwama. The match took place on August 3 and was won by Suwama. Afterwards, Sato announced he was quitting Evolution. On August 27, Sato and Aoki lost the All Asia Tag Team Championship to Black Tiger VII and Taka Michinoku.

== Championships and accomplishments ==
Mixed martial arts

- Greatest Common Multiple
  - Demolition Middleweight 4Men Tournament (2004)

Professional wrestling

- All Japan Pro Wrestling
  - All Asia Tag Team Championship (5 times) – with Hiroshi Yamato (1), Atsushi Aoki (2), and Dan Tamura (2)
  - AJPW TV Six-Man Tag Team Championship (1 time) – with Fuminori Abe and Yuma Aoyagi
  - World Junior Heavyweight Championship (3 times)
  - Jr. Tag Battle of Glory (2014, 2015, 2016) – with Atsushi Aoki
  - Jr. Tag Battle of Glory (2019) – with Yusuke Okada
  - Jr. Tag Battle of Glory (2020) – with Dan Tamura
- DDT Pro-Wrestling
  - Ironman Heavymetalweight Championship (2 times)
  - Jiyūgaoka 6-Person Tag Team Championship (1 time) – with Michael Nakazawa and Tomomitsu Matsunaga
  - KO-D Openweight Championship (1 time)
  - KO-D Tag Team Championship (1 time) – with Yukio Sakaguchi
  - Sea Of Japan 6-Person Tag Team Championship (1 time) – with Michael Nakazawa and Tomomitsu Matsunaga
  - UWA World Trios Championship (3 times) – with Danshoku Dino and Masa Takanashi (1), Keisuke Ishii and Yoshihiko (1), and Michael Nakazawa and Tomomitsu Matsunaga (1)
  - World Sato Championship (Note: Championship not officially recognized by DDT Pro-Wrestling) (1 time)
  - DDT48 (2011)
- Ganbare☆Pro-Wrestling
  - Spirit of Ganbare World Tag Team Championship (1 time) – with Tyson Maeguchi
- Pro Wrestling Illustrated
  - PWI ranked him #184 of the top 500 singles wrestlers in the PWI 500 in 2016
- Pro Wrestling Noah
  - GHC Openweight Hardcore Championship (1 time)
- Tenryu Project
  - Tenryu Project International Junior Heavyweight Championship (1 time)
  - International Junior Heavyweight Tag Team Championship (1 time) – with Keita Yano
  - Tenryu Project United National Heavyweight Tag Team Championship (1 time) – with Hideki Suzuki
  - Tenryu Project World 6-Man Tag Team Championship (1 time) – with Daichi Hashimoto and Sushi
  - Ryūkon Cup (2025)
- Tokyo Gurentai
  - Tokyo Intercontinental Tag Team Championship (2 times) – with Masaaki Mochizuki (1) and Ryo Kawamura (1)
- Union Pro Wrestling
  - Union Max Championship (1 time)
- Other
  - Independent World Junior Heavyweight Championship (1 time)

== Mixed martial arts record ==
Professional record breakdown
54 matches	24 wins	26 losses
By knockout	3	11
By submission	12	4
By decision	9	11
Draws	4	

Res.	Record	Opponent	Method	Event	Date	Round	Time	Location	Notes
Loss	24–26–4	Kanto Fuchigami	TKO (punches)	Pancrase: 322	June 27, 2021	1	3:32	Tokyo, Japan	Super Heavyweight bout.
Loss	24–25–4	Doo Hwan Kim	Submission (arm-triangle choke)	Top FC 18	May 25, 2018	1	2:21	Seoul, South Korea	Light Heavyweight bout.
Loss	24–24–4	Ryuta Sakurai	TKO (punches)	Pancrase: 289	August 20, 2017	2	0:23	Tokyo, Japan	
Win	24–23–4	Johnathan Ivey	TKO (punch)	Pancrase: 284	February 5, 2017	1	1:18	Tokyo, Japan	Open Weight bout.
Loss	23–23–4	Sergei Martynov	Submission (armbar)	Pancrase: 275	January 31, 2016	1	2:03	Tokyo, Japan	
Win	23–22–4	Shannon Ritch	Submission (armbar)	Pancrase: 269	August 9, 2015	1	1:36	Tokyo, Japan	Light Heavyweight bout.
Win	22–22–4	Hirohide Fujinuma	Submission (scarf hold armlock)	Deep: Dream Impact 2014: Omisoka Special	December 31, 2014	1	2:10	Saitama, Japan	Open Weight bout.
Loss	21–22–4	Yoshihiro Takayama	KO (slam)	U-Spirits: Again	March 9, 2013	1	4:26	Tokyo, Japan	Disputed. Has been reported as a professional wrestling match.
Loss	21–21–4	Ikkei Nagamura	Decision (unanimous)	Pancrase: Progress Tour 1	January 28, 2012	2	5:00	Tokyo, Japan	
Win	21–20–4	Osami Shibuya	Submission (scarf hold armlock)	ZST: Battle Hazard 4	July 3, 2010	1	2:22	Tokyo, Japan	
Win	20–20–4	Ryuji Ohori	Submission (heel hook)	Pancrase: Changing Tour 1	February 1, 2009	1	3:46	Tokyo, Japan	Light Heavyweight bout.
Loss	19–20–4	Min Suk Heo	TKO (corner stoppage)	Deep: Gladiator	August 16, 2008	1	1:08	Okayama, Japan	
Win	19–19–4	Jerry Nelson	Submission (heel hook)	Pancrase: Real 2008	June 29, 2008	1	2:37	Chatan, Japan	Light Heavyweight bout.
Loss	18–19–4	Alavutdin Gadjiev	KO (punch)	Pancrase: Shining 2	March 26, 2008	1	1:20	Tokyo, Japan	
Draw	18–18–4	Takeshi Sato	Draw	Kingdom of Grapple: Live 2007	November 25, 2007	2	5:00	Tokyo, Japan	
Win	18–18–3	Kentaro Abe	Submission (rear naked choke)	Pancrase: Rising 8	October 14, 2007	2	2:27	Tokyo, Japan	
Loss	17–18–3	Riki Fukuda	KO (punches)	Pancrase: 2007 Neo-Blood Tournament Finals	July 27, 2007	1	1:09	Tokyo, Japan	
Loss	17–17–3	Bryan Rafiq	TKO (punches)	Pancrase: Rising 4	April 27, 2007	2	2:16	Tokyo, Japan	
Win	17–16–3	Rikuhei Fujii	Decision (majority)	Pancrase: Rising 2	February 28, 2007	2	5:00	Tokyo, Japan	
Win	16–16–3	Sviatoslav Matafonov	Decision (unanimous)	Pancrase: Blow 11	December 10, 2006	2	5:00	Tokyo, Japan	
Win	15–16–3	Tomoyoshi Iwamiya	Decision (unanimous)	Pancrase: Blow 9	October 25, 2006	2	5:00	Tokyo, Japan	
Loss	14–16–3	Izuru Takeuchi	Decision (unanimous)	Pancrase: Blow 6	August 27, 2006	3	5:00	Yokohama, Japan	Return to Middleweight.
Win	14–15–3	Daisuke Hanazawa	Submission (toe hold)	Pancrase: Blow 2	March 19, 2006	2	2:01	Osaka, Japan	Lightweight debut.
Loss	13–15–3	Yuji Sakuragi	TKO (soccer kicks)	Pancrase: Blow 1	January 26, 2006	1	0:55	Tokyo, Japan	
Draw	13–14–3	Kyosuke Sasaki	Draw	Pancrase: Spiral 10	December 4, 2005	1	10:00	Tokyo, Japan	
Loss	13–14–2	Po'ai Suganuma	Decision (unanimous)	Pancrase: Spiral 8	October 2, 2005	2	5:00	Yokohama, Japan	
Win	13–13–2	Tenshin Matsumoto	Submission (rear naked choke)	Pancrase: Z	September 3, 2005	1	2:43	Kumamoto, Japan	
Win	12–13–2	Seiji Ogura	Submission (rear naked choke)	Pancrase: Spiral 5	July 10, 2005	1	4:16	Yokohama, Japan	
Win	11–13–2	Sumio Koyano	TKO (corner stoppage)	Pancrase: Spiral 1	February 4, 2005	1	2:57	Tokyo, Japan	Return to Heavyweight.
Loss	10–13–2	Yuji Hisamatsu	Decision (unanimous)	Pancrase: Brave 11	November 26, 2004	2	5:00	Tokyo, Japan	
Draw	10–12–2	Kyosuke Sasaki	Draw	Pancrase: Brave 9	October 12, 2004	2	5:00	Tokyo, Japan	
Loss	10–12–1	Katsuya Inoue	TKO (punches)	Pancrase: Brave 6	June 22, 2004	1	3:53	Tokyo, Japan	
Win	10–11–1	Yuichi Nakanishi	Decision (majority)	Pancrase: Brave 3	March 29, 2004	3	5:00	Tokyo, Japan	
Win	9–11–1	Daisuke Nakamura	Decision (unanimous)	GCM: Demolition 040118	January 18, 2004	2	5:00	Tokyo, Japan	Won Demolition Middleweight 4Men Tournament.
Win	8–11–1	Shinpei Sotoyama	TKO (punches)	GCM: Demolition 030923	September 23, 2003	1	2:29	Tokyo, Japan	
Loss	7–11–1	Hidehiko Hasegawa	Decision (split)	Pancrase: Hybrid 7	June 22, 2003	2	5:00	Osaka, Japan	
Win	7–10–1	Electroshock	Submission (heel hook)	Deep: 9th Impact	May 5, 2003	2	0:57	Tokyo, Japan	Light Heavyweight bout.
Win	6–10–1	Hiroshi Shibata	Submission (toe hold)	GCM: Demolition 030323	March 23, 2003	1	2:36	Tokyo, Japan	
Loss	5–10–1	Yushin Okami	Decision (unanimous)	Pancrase: Hybrid 1	January 26, 2003	2	5:00	Tokyo, Japan	
Draw	5–9–1	Susumu Yamasaki	Draw (unanimous)	Pancrase: Spirit 7	October 29, 2002	2	5:00	Tokyo, Japan	
Loss	5–9	Masaya Kojima	Decision (unanimous)	KF 2: Kushima's Fight 2	July 23, 2002	3	5:00	Nagasaki, Japan	
Win	5–8	Takaku Fuke	Decision (majority)	Pancrase: Spirit 4	May 11, 2002	2	5:00	Osaka, Japan	
Win	4–8	Kazuki Okubo	Decision (majority)	Pancrase: Spirit 2	February 17, 2002	2	5:00	Osaka, Japan	
Loss	3–8	Hideaki Iwasaki	KO (punch)	Pancrase: Proof 6	October 30, 2001	2	4:20	Tokyo, Japan	
Loss	3–7	Keiichiro Yamamiya	Decision (unanimous)	Zero1: Shingeki Chapter 2	August 30, 2001	2	5:00	Tokyo, Japan	
Loss	3–6	Kazuo Misaki	Submission (rear naked choke)	Pancrase: 2001 Neo-Blood Tournament Opening Round	May 5, 2001	1	4:08	Tokyo, Japan	Return to Middleweight.
Win	3–5	Ryo Chonan	Decision (unanimous)	Pancrase: 2001 Neo-Blood Tournament Eliminations	May 5, 2001	3	5:00	Tokyo, Japan	Heavyweight debut.
Loss	2–5	Nathan Marquardt	Submission (rear naked choke)	Pancrase: Proof 2	March 31, 2001	1	1:53	Osaka, Japan	
Win	2–4	Shinya Sato	Decision (unanimous)	Pancrase: Trans 8	December 9, 2000	1	10:00	Aomori, Japan	Light Heavyweight bout.
Loss	1–4	Hiroshi Shibata	Decision (unanimous)	Pancrase: Trans 6	October 31, 2000	1	10:00	Tokyo, Japan	
Loss	1–3	Eiji Ishikawa	Submission (rear naked choke)	Pancrase: 2000 Neo-Blood Tournament Second Round	August 27, 2000	1	2:43	Osaka, Japan	
Loss	1–2	Yuji Hoshino	Decision (unanimous)	Pancrase: 2000 Neo-Blood Tournament Opening Round	July 23, 2000	2	3:00	Tokyo, Japan	
Win	1–1	Michael Sa Jin Kwok	Submission (armbar)	Pancrase: Trans 3	April 30, 2000	1	2:23	Yokohama, Japan	Middleweight debut.
Loss	0–1	Daisuke Watanabe	Decision (unanimous)	Pancrase: Trans 2	February 27, 2000	1	10:00	Osaka, Japan	
