= Tokudome =

Tokudome (written: 徳留) is a Japanese surname. Notable people with the surname include:

- Kazuki Tokudome (徳留 一樹, born 1987), Japanese mixed martial artist
- Masaki Tokudome (徳留 真紀, born 1971), Japanese motorcycle racer
