= UFC Fight Night: Hunt vs. Nelson =

UFC mixed martial arts event in 2014

- The poster for UFC Fight Night: Hunt vs. Nelson
- Promotion: Ultimate Fighting Championship
- Date: September 20, 2014
- Venue: Saitama Super Arena
- City: Saitama, Japan
- Attendance: 12,395

Event chronology
UFC Fight Night: Bigfoot vs. Arlovski	UFC Fight Night: Hunt vs. Nelson	UFC 178: Johnson vs. Cariaso

UFC Fight Night: Hunt vs. Nelson (also known as UFC Fight Night 52) was a mixed martial arts event held on September 20, 2014, at Saitama Super Arena in Saitama, Japan.

== Background ==
The event was the third time that the organization hosted a fight card in Saitama, following UFC 144: Edgar vs. Henderson in February 2012 and UFC on Fuel TV: Silva vs. Stann in March 2013.

The event was headlined by a heavyweight bout between Roy Nelson and Mark Hunt.

Tatsuya Kawajiri was briefly linked to a matchup at the event with Darren Elkins, however the bout never materialized as Kawajiri was sidelined indefinitely with a detached retina.

Chris Cariaso was originally scheduled to face Kyoji Horiguchi at the event. However, Cariaso was pulled from the bout with Horoguchi in favor of a matchup with current flyweight champion Demetrious Johnson at UFC 178. Horiguchi faced Jon Delos Reyes.

Kyle Noke was expected to face Yoshihiro Akiyama at the event, but eventually was forced out of the bout with a knee injury. Akiyama instead faced Amir Sadollah.

Urijah Faber was briefly linked to a bout with Masanori Kanehara at the event. However, before the bout was officially announced, Faber was removed due to injury and Kanehara faced Alex Caceres.

== Results ==
Main Card (UFC Fight Pass)
Weight class				Method	Round	Time	Notes
Heavyweight	Mark Hunt	def.	Roy Nelson	KO (punch)	2	3:00
Lightweight	Myles Jury	def.	Takanori Gomi	TKO (punches)	1	1:32
Welterweight	Yoshihiro Akiyama	def.	Amir Sadollah	Decision (unanimous) (30–27, 30–27, 30–27)	3	5:00
Women's Bantamweight	Miesha Tate	def.	Rin Nakai	Decision (unanimous) (29–28, 30–27, 30–27)	3	5:00
Welterweight	Kiichi Kunimoto	def.	Richard Walsh	Decision (split) (28–29, 29–28, 29–28)	3	5:00
Flyweight	Kyoji Horiguchi	def.	Jon Delos Reyes	TKO (punches)	1	3:48
Preliminary card (UFC Fight Pass)
Bantamweight	Masanori Kanehara	def.	Alex Caceres	Decision (unanimous) (29–28, 29–28, 29–28)	3	5:00
Featherweight	Katsunori Kikuno	def.	Sam Sicilia	Submission (rear-naked choke)	2	1:38
Welterweight	Lim Hyun-gyu	def.	Takenori Sato	TKO (elbows)	1	1:18
Bantamweight	Kang Kyung-ho	def.	Michinori Tanaka	Decision (split) (29–28, 28–29, 29–28)	3	5:00
Lightweight	Johnny Case	def.	Kazuki Tokudome	Technical Submission (guillotine choke)	2	2:34
Featherweight	Maximo Blanco	def.	Dan Hooker	Decision (unanimous) (29–28, 29–28, 29–28)	3	5:00

== Bonus awards ==
The following fighters received $50,000 bonuses:

- Fight of the Night: Kyung Ho Kang vs. Michinori Tanaka
- Performance of the Night: Mark Hunt and Johnny Case

^ Bonus winner Michinori Tanaka had his award rescinded after testing positive for banned substances during his post fight drug screening.

== See also ==
- List of UFC events
- 2014 in UFC
