= Chute Boxe Academy =

Muay Thai academy in Curitiba, Brazil

- Est.: 1978; 48 years ago
- Founded by: Rudimar Fedrigo
- Primary trainers: Rudimar Fedrigo; Mestre Zito; Gerson Schilipacke; Jose Landi
- Current titleholders: Cris Cyborg Bellator Featherweight Champion (2020–present), Charles Oliveira UFC BMF Champion (2026-Present)
- Past titleholders: Anderson Silva Middleweight Champion (UFC 2006–2013) 185 lb (84 kg; 13.2 st); Cris Cyborg Featherweight Champion (Strikeforce (2009–2011), Invicta FC (2013–2016), UFC (2016–2018) 145 lb (66 kg; 10.4 st); Wanderlei Silva Middleweight Champion (Pride 2001–2007) 205 lb (93 kg; 14.6 st); Mauricio Rua Light Heavyweight Champion (UFC 2010) 205 lb (93 kg; 14.6 st); Murilo Rua Middleweight Champion (Elite XC 2007) 185 lb (84 kg; 13.2 st); Charles Oliveira UFC Lightweight Champion (2021-2022)
- Training facilities: Curitiba, Paraná, Brazil; São Paulo, Brazil; Long Beach, California, United States

The Chute Boxe Academy (Brazilian Portuguese: [ˈʃutʃi ˈbɔksi]; "Kick-Boxing") is a Brazilian martial arts academy. It opened as a Muay Thai academy in 1978 in Curitiba, Paraná, Brazil. Head trainer Rudimar Fedrigo later expanded the program in 1991 to include other aspects of modern mixed martial arts, such as wrestling and submission grappling. By 1995, the Chute Boxe team was considered a prime training ground for Vale Tudo fighters.

In the 2000s, Chute Boxe expanded through affiliated academies in Brazil and internationally; in 2004, an American branch, Chute Boxe USA, was established in Los Angeles, California. As several prominent fighters and coaches departed in the late 2000s, Chute Boxe underwent a period of fragmentation, with former members establishing or joining independent academies while retaining elements of the Chute Boxe training philosophy and lineage. In São Paulo, coach Diego Lima established the city's Chute Boxe branch, which became known as Chute Boxe Diego Lima and developed into one of the most prominent modern academies associated with the Chute Boxe lineage. The academy became a major training ground for professional mixed martial artists, continuing the Chute Boxe tradition to a new generation.

Chute Boxe fighters are characterized by being extremely aggressive and physical, well-rounded fighters.

== History ==
=== Beginnings ===
In the 1970s, in search of a more full contact martial art, Taekwondo black belt Nélio "Naja" Borges de Souza learned Muay Thai in Thailand and brought it to Brazil. He moved to Curitiba and in 1978 his student Rudimar Fedrigo would found the Chute Boxing academy.

The style developed by Nélio Naja and his students had more emphasis on various kicks (due many of the early Brazilian Thai boxers coming from Taekwondo and Kyokushin Karate) but soon, the "Chute Boxe" style of Muay Thai became characterized as extremely aggressive, with wild combinations, hard low kicks and usually lacking in defense, trying to defeat their opponents as fast as possible. The students of Nélio Naja also adopted a rank system of colored belt system used in other martial arts (in particular Taekwondo), in order to better rank and differentiate students, competitors, instructors and teachers, but soon adapted to Thai culture and switched to Prajieds, armband ropes traditionally wore by Thai boxers. Although not from Thailand, this system is widespread but not universal in Brazil.

The Chute Boxe team first made a name for themselves in the MMA world during the late 1990s in the Brazilian vale tudo promotion known as the International Vale Tudo Championship (IVC). With an aggressive and physical style focused around their muay thai skills, Chute Boxe fighters captured three of the four title belts in the promotion (Wanderlei Silva winning the light heavyweight belt, José Landi-Jons winning the middleweight belt, and Rafael Cordeiro winning the lightweight belt). The promotion ended up serving as a spring board for the Chute Boxe team (as well as many other Brazilian MMA stars) into the lucrative Japanese MMA market. For Chute Boxe specifically, it would help to launch their careers in Japan's PRIDE FC.

=== PRIDE FC dynasty ===
The major cog of the Chute Boxe machine in PRIDE was Wanderlei Silva. Known for a brawling style complete with lethal knees and leaping stomps, he would exemplify Chute Boxe style martial arts in PRIDE's middleweight division and eventually win the 2003 PRIDE FC Middleweight Grand Prix and the PRIDE FC middleweight title which he would hold for 5 and a half years.

Coming off of a disappointing five-round decision loss to Tito Ortiz at UFC 25: Ultimate Japan, Silva would return to PRIDE to earn the biggest victory of his career to that point over the Lion's Den's Guy Mezger. It would be 20 fights and over four years before he would lose again in a controversial decision to superheavyweight Mark Hunt. During this span he defeated notable fighters Kazushi Sakuraba (three times), Quinton "Rampage" Jackson (twice), Yuki Kondo, Ikuhisa Minowa, Hidehiko Yoshida, Kiyoshi Tamura, Dan Henderson, Alexander Otsuka, Shungo Oyama, Hiromitsu Kanehara, and would draw with Mirko "Cro Cop" Filipović.

His aura of invincibility wouldn't truly be broken until a decision loss to Ricardo Arona in the 2005 PRIDE FC middle weight Grand Prix. His loss would be avenged later that night by teammate and rising star, Mauricio "Shogun" Rua. Silva is noted to have never lost under full PRIDE FC rules at his weight class; PRIDE's event in Las Vegas had altered rules. Silva Challenged Arona to a rematch for the middleweight title and beat him by decision.

=== Enter the Rua brothers ===
As the older of the Rua brothers, Murilo "Ninja" Rua had a mediocre run during his years with PRIDE FC. Wins over Mario Sperry, Akira Shoji and Alexander Otsuka established him as a contender in the organization. His younger brother Mauricio "Shogun" Rua would also enter the PRIDE fighting championships and would prove the most successful fighter produced by Chute Boxe under Wanderlei Silva's and Ninja's guidance.

Younger than Murilo by about a year and a half, "Shogun" has defeated a number of prolific fighters including Evangelista "Cyborg" Santos, Akira Shoji, Akihiro Gono, Quinton "Rampage" Jackson, Alistair Overeem (twice), Antônio Rogério "Minotouro" Nogueira, Ricardo Arona, Kevin Randleman, Mark Coleman, Chuck Liddell, and Lyoto Machida. Shogun was the UFC light heavyweight champion until losing his first title defense against Jon Jones at UFC 128. His style includes much of the standard Chute Boxe Muay Thai clinch work, knees, stomps, and soccer kicks, as well as polished Brazilian Jiu Jitsu.

=== Rivalry with Brazilian Top Team ===
The opposite number in terms of Brazilian dominance in PRIDE FC was the Brazilian Top Team (BTT) which was comprised, at the time, of such fighters as Antonio Rodrigo "Minotauro" Nogueira, Ricardo Arona, and Murilo Bustamante. Both BTT and Chute Boxe were the dominant Brazilian teams at the time, representing different contrasting combat philosophies: Chute Boxe was mostly based in a very aggressive Muay Thai style, while BTT was founded by Carlson Gracie's students and had a more well-rounded BJJ-based approach. While there were some tensions between the team, the rivalry was thought ended after a discussion-turned-brawl between Ricardo Arona and Wanderlei Silva at the Tokyo Hilton hotel in the eve of Pride 20 in 2002. The same event saw the first confrontation between both teams, matching Chute Boxe's representative Murílo "Ninja" Rua against BTT's Mário Sperry. Competition between the two teams was hardly limited to the Pride scene however. Matches between fighters of the two organizations had taken place in Brazil, Portugal and other parts of the world before, but perhaps the most interesting chapter of the rivalry took place on 28 August 2005 at the 2005 PRIDE FC middle weight Grand Prix.

The 2005 PRIDE FC middleweight Grand Prix would be the first such competition for newcomers Mauricio Rua and BTT's Ricardo Arona. Both scored impressive victories over highly regarded veterans Alistair Overeem and middleweight champ Wanderlei Silva respectively. It was Arona's victory over the latter that would stoke the flames of the rivalry because until then Silva had been the torch-bearer for Chute Boxe. Later that night, however, "Shogun" would pick up the torch with a thoroughly dominating first-round KO of Arona, ultimately finishing him on the ground which was considered Arona's strength.

Another notable aspect of this period is that it shortly followed the departure of promising prospect Anderson Silva. Silva had noted several disputes with Chute Boxe's management as reasons for leaving the team and shortly began training with some of Brazilian Top Team's best in the Nogueira brothers. He was quoted in an ESPN article as stating that friendships formed with his former rivals helped to save his career upon his departure from Chute Boxe.

=== Post-Pride era and Chute Boxe Diego Lima ===
With the demise of PRIDE FC in late 2007, coinciding with the departure of its first mass-appeal superstar Wanderlei Silva around the same time, Chute Boxe entered a new era. Moreover, the Rua brothers, Mauricio and Murilo, Jorge Patino, and Andre "Dida" Amade, also departed Chute Boxe to start their own gym. One of the top instructors, Rafael Cordeiro, also left around that time to found his own gym in the US, Kings MMA. However, up and coming fighters, such as lightweight Jean Silva, have augmented their talent. In addition, fighter Evangelista Santos has recently competed in Strikeforce as well as his ex-wife, female fighter Cristiane "Cyborg" Santos.

In a 2014 interview, Rudimar Fedrigo stated that Chute Boxe had 22 academies in Brazil and described the organization as having gyms throughout the country. He also stated that the Curitiba headquarters had approximately 5,000 students, reflecting Chute Boxe's role as both a professional MMA team and a martial arts school. Fedrigo acknowledged the increasing competitiveness of MMA and the difficulty of producing a dominant generation of fighters comparable to Chute Boxe's earlier era.

During this period, Chute Boxe also expanded beyond its original Curitiba headquarters, with coach Diego Lima establishing a São Paulo branch known as Chute Boxe Diego Lima. Lima developed the academy into a prominent training and management team, combining the traditional Chute Boxe emphasis on aggressive Muay Thai and pressure-based MMA with a focus on developing younger fighters. The São Paulo gym gradually became home to a new generation of Brazilian and international fighters, including Felipe Sertanejo, Allan Nascimento, Elves Brener, and later attracted major names such as Charles Oliveira and Ian Machado Garry. Although operating independently from the original Curitiba headquarters, Chute Boxe Diego Lima continued the Chute Boxe name and fighting philosophy into the post-PRIDE era, eventually becoming one of the lineage's most successful modern branches.

In 2018 UFC fighter Charles "do Bronx" Oliveira joined Chute Boxe Diego Lima starting a 10-fight win streak. According to him, his former gym Macaco Gold Team (headed by Jorge "Macaco" Patino, a Chute Boxe alumni) was mostly focused BJJ with complementary striking, and he felt he needed to improve his striking game. Patino is still his BJJ coach but now he is complemented with Chute Boxe's aggressive Muay Thai style. In 2021 he became the UFC Lightweight Champion after defeating Michael Chandler with a T.K.O. In 2023, Oliveira was awarded a black prajied in Muay Thai by Rudimar Fedrigo.

== Chute Boxe fighters ==
- Wanderlei Silva (former PRIDE Middleweight Champion), left Chute Boxe in 2007 to train with Xtreme Couture. In 2008 Silva opened a new gym under the banner "Wand Fight Team".
- Mauricio Rua (PRIDE 2005 Middleweight Grand Prix champion and former UFC champion light heavyweight), left Chute Boxe in 2007 and founded Universidade da Luta.
- Murilo Rua (former Elite XC Middleweight Champion), left Chute Boxe in 2007 and founded Universidade da Luta.
- Anderson Silva (former UFC middleweight champion), left Chute Boxe in 2003 to start MuayThai Dream Team. Left MuayThai Dream Team to start at Black House.
- Gabriel Gonzaga, left Chute Boxe in 2006 to move to Ludlow, Massachusetts, to join Team Link.
- Assuério Silva, left Chute Boxe in 2003 to start MuayThai Dream Team.
- Thiago Silva, left Chute Boxe in 2008 and joined American Top Team.
- Kazushi Sakuraba, trained with former rival Wanderlei Silva at Chute Boxe in preparation for his bout with Ken Shamrock in 2005.
- Andre Dida, left Chute Boxe in 2007 and founded Universidade da Luta.
- Cristiano Marcello, left Chute Boxe in 2009 to focus on with his own martial arts academy, CM System.
- Jorge Patino, started Gold Team Fighters USA/Gold Team Fighters Houston.
- Mariusz Linke, first Polish born BJJ black belt, briefly trained with Cristiano Marcello and Jorge Patino.
- Luiz Azeredo, former PRIDE FC Lightweight title challenger.
- Rafael Cordeiro, left Chute Boxe in 2007 and founded Kings MMA.

== See also ==
- List of professional MMA training camps
