= 2010 in Pancrase =

Mixed martial arts events

Information
- First date: January 10, 2010
- Last date: December 19, 2010

Events
- Total events: 16

Fights
- Total fights: 233
- Title fights: 11

Chronology
2009 in Pancrase	2010 in Pancrase	2011 in Pancrase

The year 2010 was the 18th year in the history of Pancrase, a mixed martial arts promotion based in Japan. In 2010 Pancrase held 16 events beginning with Pancrase: Gate 4th Chance.

== Title fights ==
Title fights in 2010
Weight class				Method	Round	Time	Event	Notes
Middleweight	Yuki Kondo (ic)	def.	Takenori Sato	Decision (Unanimous)	3	5:00	Pancrase: Passion Tour 1	(Note: For the Pancrase Middleweight Championship.)
Super Flyweight	Kiyotaka Shimizu	def.	Mitsuhisa Sunabe (c)	Decision (Majority)	3	5:00	Pancrase: Passion Tour 1	(Note: For the Pancrase Super Flyweight Championship.)
Middleweight	Yuki Kondo (ic)	def.	Ichiro Kanai	Decision (Unanimous)	3	5:00	Pancrase: Passion Tour 4	(Note: For the Pancrase Middleweight Championship.)
Welterweight	Kengo Ura	def.	Keiichiro Yamamiya	Decision (Split)	3	5:00	Pancrase: Passion Tour 5	(Note: For the Pancrase Welterweight Championship.)
Middleweight	Yuki Kondo (c)	vs.	Yuji Hisamatsu	Draw	3	5:00	Pancrase: Passion Tour 6	(Note: For the Pancrase Middleweight Championship.)
Super Flyweight	Kiyotaka Shimizu (c)	def.	Isao Hirose	TKO (Doctor Stoppage)	2	3:06	Pancrase: Passion Tour 6	(Note: For the Pancrase Super Flyweight Championship.)
Light Heavyweight	Yuji Sakuragi	def.	Ryo Kawamura (c)	TKO (Punches)	1	3:55	Pancrase: Passion Tour 8	(Note: For the Pancrase Light Heavyweight Championship.)
Bantamweight	Manabu Inoue (c)	def.	Tashiro Nishiuchi	Decision (Majority)	3	5:00	Pancrase: Passion Tour 8	(Note: For the Pancrase Bantamweight Championship.)
Light Heavyweight	Yuji Sakuragi	vs.	Ryo Kawamura (c)	Draw	3	5:00	Pancrase: Passion Tour 11	(Note: For the Pancrase Light Heavyweight Championship.)
Middleweight	Rikuhei Fujii	def.	Yuki Kondo (c)	Decision (Unanimous)	3	5:00	Pancrase: Passion Tour 11	(Note: For the Pancrase Middleweight Championship.)
Super Flyweight	Kiyotaka Shimizu (c)	vs.	Mitsuhisa Sunabe	Draw	3	5:00	Pancrase: Passion Tour 11	(Note: For the Pancrase Super Flyweight Championship.)

== Events list ==
#	Event title	Date	Arena	Location
234	Pancrase: Passion Tour 12	December 19, 2010	Azelea Taisho Hall	Osaka, Osaka, Japan
233	Pancrase: Passion Tour 11	December 5, 2010	Differ Ariake Arena	Tokyo, Japan
232	Pancrase: Passion Tour 10	November 3, 2010	Differ Ariake Arena	Tokyo, Japan
231	Pancrase: Passion Tour 9	October 3, 2010	Differ Ariake Arena	Tokyo, Japan
230	Pancrase: Gate 6th Chance	September 19, 2010	Gold's Gym South Tokyo Annex	Tokyo, Japan
229	Pancrase: 2010 Pro-Am Open Catch Wrestling Tournament	September 19, 2010	Gold's Gym South Tokyo Annex	Tokyo, Japan
228	Pancrase: Passion Tour 8	September 5, 2010	Differ Ariake Arena	Tokyo, Japan
227	Pancrase: Passion Tour 7	August 8, 2010	Differ Ariake Arena	Tokyo, Japan
226	Pancrase: Passion Tour 6	July 4, 2010	Differ Ariake Arena	Tokyo, Japan
225	Pancrase: Passion Tour 5	June 5, 2010	Differ Ariake Arena	Tokyo, Japan
224	Pancrase: Gate 5th Chance	May 16, 2010	Gold's Gym South Tokyo Annex	Tokyo, Japan
223	Pancrase: Passion Tour 4	April 29, 2010	Differ Ariake Arena	Tokyo, Japan
222	Pancrase: Passion Tour 3	April 4, 2010	Differ Ariake Arena	Tokyo, Japan
221	Pancrase: Passion Tour 2	March 22, 2010	Azelea Taisho Hall	Osaka, Osaka, Japan
220	Pancrase: Passion Tour 1	February 7, 2010	Differ Ariake Arena	Tokyo, Japan
219	Pancrase: Gate 4th Chance	January 10, 2010	Gold's Gym South Tokyo Annex	Tokyo, Japan

== Pancrase: Gate 4th Chance ==
Pancrase: Gate 4th Chance was an event held on January 10, 2010, at The Gold's Gym South Tokyo Annex in Tokyo, Japan.

=== Results ===
Main Card
Weight class				Method	Round	Time	Notes
	Kensaku Nakamura	def.	Daiei Lee	Decision (Unanimous)	1	5:00
	Yoji Saito	def.	Yuya Nagai	Submission (Armbar)	1	3:39
	Go Yamanaka	def.	Takatoshi Urasaki	Decision (Unanimous)	1	5:00
	Daichi Kitakata	def.	Yosuke Hattori	Decision (Unanimous)	1	5:00
	Jason Symak	def.	Satoshi Watanabe	TKO (Punches)	1	2:08
	Yuhei Fukuda	def.	Yosuke Taka	TKO (Punches)	1	4:18
	Shigeaki Kusayanagi	def.	Junya Nishikawa	TKO (Punches)	2	2:40
	Kensaku Nakamura	def.	Issei Issei	Submission (Armbar)	2	2:30
	Daiei Lee	def.	Yasuto Abe	Decision (Majority)	1	5:00
	Yuya Nagai	def.	Tomoharu Toda	Decision (Unanimous)	1	5:00
	Yoji Saito	def.	Yojin Iwara	Decision (Unanimous)	1	5:00
	Go Yamanaka	def.	Masaki Kobuchi	Decision (Unanimous)	1	5:00
	Takatoshi Urasaki	def.	Ryuta Aiko	Decision (Unanimous)	1	5:00
	Yosuke Hattori	def.	Satoshi Usui	Decision (Unanimous)	1	5:00
	Daichi Kitakata	def.	Tsukasa Arai	Decision (Unanimous)	2	5:00
	Kensaku Nakamura	def.	Masaomi Saito	TKO (Punches)	2	0:34
	Issei Issei	def.	Akihiro Ono	Decision (Majority)	1	5:00
	Daiei Lee	def.	Makoto Sasaki	Decision (Unanimous)	1	5:00
	Yasuto Abe	def.	Kenta Okuyama	TKO (Punches)	1	1:39
	Yuya Nagai	def.	Ironman 238	Decision (Unanimous)	1	5:00
	Tomoharu Toda	def.	Tatsuro Ikehata	Submission (Armbar)	1	3:36
	Yojin Iwara	def.	Satoru Takahashi	Decision (Majority)	1	5:00
	Masaki Kobuchi	def.	Kota Higashitani	TKO (Punches)	1	0:26
	Go Yamanaka	def.	Daisuke Oishi	Decision (Unanimous)	1	5:00
	Ryuta Aiko	def.	Kazuki Itaya	Decision (Unanimous)	2	5:00
	Takatoshi Urasaki	def.	Ben Henry	Submission (Rear-Naked Choke)	1	4:30

== Pancrase: Passion Tour 1 ==
Pancrase: Passion Tour 1 was an event held on February 7, 2010, at The Differ Ariake Arena in Tokyo, Japan.

=== Results ===
Main Card
Weight class				Method	Round	Time	Notes
Middleweight	Yuki Kondo (ic)	def.	Takenori Sato	Decision (Unanimous)	3	5:00	(Note: For the Pancrase Middleweight Championship.)
Super Flyweight	Kiyotaka Shimizu	def.	Mitsuhisa Sunabe (c)	Decision (Majority)	3	5:00	(Note: For the Pancrase Super Flyweight Championship.)
	Seiya Kawahara	def.	Tashiro Nishiuchi	Decision (Unanimous)	3	5:00
	Yuji Hisamatsu	def.	Keiichiro Yamamiya	Decision (Majority)	3	5:00
	Tetsuya Yamada	def.	Takafumi Ito	TKO (Upkick and Punches)	2	2:22
	Tomonari Kanomata	def.	Shigeyuki Uchiyama	Decision (Majority)	2	5:00
	Isao Kobayashi	def.	Hiroki Aoki	TKO (Punches)	1	1:00
	Isao Hirose	def.	Takuma Ishii	Submission (Rear-Naked Choke)	3	1:34
	Hoon Kim	def.	Ryuji Ohori	Submission (Armbar)	1	3:36
	Daisuke Watanabe	def.	Kosei Kubota	Decision (Majority)	2	5:00
	Kengo Ura	def.	Shingo Suzuki	TKO (Punches)	1	1:43
	Akihiro Ono	def.	Naoki Tajima	Decision (Unanimous)	1	5:00
	Norifumi Aihara	def.	Tomoharu Toda	Submission (Armbar)	1	2:26
	Tamotsu Kitada	def.	Toru Kanamori	Submission (Triangle Choke)	1	1:41
	Naoki Tajima	def.	Yasuto Abe	TKO (Punches)	1	2:53
	Akihiro Ono	def.	Koichi Sugai	Submission (Armbar)	1	4:09
	Tomoharu Toda	def.	Takahide Kobayashi	Decision (Majority)	1	5:00
	Norifumi Aihara	def.	Atsushi Masukura	Submission (Armbar)	1	1:41
	Naoki Tajima	def.	Koji Obata	TKO (Punches)	1	4:58
	Koichi Sugai	def.	Akihito Hara	Decision (Unanimous)	1	5:00
	Takahide Kobayashi	def.	Ryota Masuda	Decision (Majority)	1	5:00

== Pancrase: Passion Tour 2 ==
Pancrase: Passion Tour 2 was an event held on March 22, 2010, at The Azelea Taisho Hall in Osaka, Osaka, Japan.

=== Results ===
Main Card
Weight class				Method	Round	Time	Notes
	Tomoyoshi Iwamiya	vs.	Kiichi Kunimoto	Draw	3	5:00
	Yu Shiori	def.	Masahiro Toryu	KO (Punch)	1	0:29
	Soyu Tanabe	def.	Hiroyuki Tsuzuki	Decision (Unanimous)	2	5:00
	Yuta Nakamura	vs.	Yoshifumi Dogaki	Draw	2	5:00
	Tamotsu Kitada	def.	Hidehira Yabu	Submission (Triangle Choke)	1	3:07
	Motonobu Tezuka	def.	Nobuhiro Yoshitake	Decision (Unanimous)	2	5:00
	Yuki Uejima	def.	Sho Nonaka	Decision (Unanimous)	2	5:00
	Daichi Kitakata	def.	Yuya Ono	Submission (Guillotine Choke)	1	0:45
	Kengo Kengo	def.	Shingen Morita	TKO (Punches)	1	2:17
	Hideki Miyatani	def.	Kiyoshi Seto	Submission (Armbar)	1	1:07

== Pancrase: Passion Tour 3 ==
Pancrase: Passion Tour 3 was an event held on April 4, 2010, at The Differ Ariake Arena in Tokyo, Japan.

=== Results ===
Main Card
Weight class				Method	Round	Time	Notes
	Koji Oishi	def.	Isao Kobayashi	Decision (Unanimous)	3	5:00
	Manabu Inoue	def.	Tatsuya So	Decision (Unanimous)	3	5:00
	Keiichiro Yamamiya	def.	Takenori Sato	Decision (Majority)	2	5:00
	Isao Hirose	def.	Ryota Uozumi	TKO (Corner Stoppage)	2	1:22
	Ryota Sasaki	def.	Hayato Shimizu	Decision (Unanimous)	2	5:00
	Takuya Eizumi	def.	Yuichiro Yajima	TKO (Punches)	2	0:29
	Eriya Matsuda	def.	Jonathan Gary	TKO (Punches)	1	1:56
	Junichi Ota	def.	Naoki Tajima	Decision (Unanimous)	2	5:00
	Shigenobu Takahashi	def.	Daisuke Shimoyama	Submission (Rear-Naked Choke)	2	2:56
	Keigo Hirayama	def.	Akihiro Ono	Decision (Unanimous)	2	5:00
	Juntaro Ami	def.	Koji Nakamura	TKO (Corner Stoppage)	1	2:27
	Motoshi Miyaji	def.	Norifumi Aihara	Technical Submission (Armbar)	2	4:57
	Kensaku Nakamura	def.	Yusuke Kawanago	Decision (Split)	2	5:00
	Masakazu Takafuji	def.	Takashi Ito	TKO (Punches)	1	0:24
	Hiroshi Tomita	def.	Yoji Saito	Decision (Unanimous)	2	5:00
	Shoko Sato	def.	Takumi Shimazaki	Decision (Unanimous)	2	5:00
	Yuta Numakura	def.	Ryo Saito	Decision (Unanimous)	2	5:00
	Go Yamanaka	def.	Daisuke Tsujita	TKO (Doctor Stoppage)	1	5:00
	Yoshihiro Matsunaga	def.	Teppei Shimizu	Decision (Unanimous)	2	5:00
	Hiroyuki Nakajima	def.	Masakazu Utsugi	Submission (Rear-Naked Choke)	2	3:16

== Pancrase: Passion Tour 4 ==
Pancrase: Passion Tour 4 was an event held on April 29, 2010, at The Differ Ariake Arena in Tokyo, Japan.

=== Results ===
Main Card
Weight class				Method	Round	Time	Notes
Middleweight	Yuki Kondo (ic)	def.	Ichiro Kanai	Decision (Unanimous)	3	5:00	(Note: For the Pancrase Middleweight Championship.)
	Mitsuhisa Sunabe	def.	Hayato Sato	TKO (Punches)	1	2:31
	Kazuki Tokudome	def.	Takafumi Ito	TKO (Punches)	1	3:45
	Tashiro Nishiuchi	def.	Hayato Shimizu	TKO (Punches)	1	4:30
	Shigeyuki Uchiyama	def.	Wataru Takahashi	Decision (Unanimous)	2	5:00
	Daiju Takase	vs.	Hoon Kim	Draw	2	5:00
	Daisuke Watanabe	vs.	Keitaro Maeda	Draw	2	5:00
	Kosei Kubota	def.	Tamotsu Kitada	TKO (Punches)	1	4:22
	Tomoyoshi Iwamiya	vs.	Kota Okazawa	Draw	2	5:00
	Yuhei Fukuda	def.	Satoshi Watanabe	KO (Punch)	1	0:49
	Kenji Narita	vs.	Yoshihito Kuroki	Draw	2	5:00
	Shigeaki Kusayanagi	def.	Toru Kanamori	TKO (Punches)	2	2:28
	Makoto Kawawa	vs.	Junya Nishikawa	Draw	2	5:00
	Sota Kojima	def.	Chikara Shimabukuro	Submission (Straight Armbar)	1	3:04
	Tsukasa Arai	def.	Yosuke Hattori	KO (Punch)	1	0:08

== Pancrase: Gate 5th Chance ==
Pancrase: Gate 5th Chance was an event held on May 16, 2010, at The Gold's Gym South Tokyo Annex in Tokyo, Japan.

=== Results ===
Main Card
Weight class				Method	Round	Time	Notes
	Koji Obata	def.	Akihito Hara	TKO (Punches)	1	2:39
	Ryosuke Togashi	def.	Nobuhito Sakurada	Decision (Unanimous)	1	5:00
	Masaomi Saito	def.	Yudai Aoyama	Submission (Rear-Naked Choke)	1	1:38
	Ryota Masuda	def.	Ryuta Aiko	TKO (Punches)	1	3:26
	Hiroyuki Hara	def.	Noboru Chida	TKO (Punches)	1	2:39
	Yoshiyuki Ishikawa	def.	Kazuyoshi Kiyama	Decision (Unanimous)	2	3:00
	Akihito Hara	def.	Koichi Sugai	KO (Punch)	1	1:07
	Koji Obata	def.	Osamu Takashina	Decision (Unanimous)	2	3:00
	Nobuhito Sakurada	def.	Daiei Lee	Submission (Rear-Naked Choke)	1	2:40
	Ryosuke Togashi	def.	Atsushi Masukura	TKO (Punches)	1	0:24
	Masaomi Saito	def.	Yojin Iwara	Submission (Rear-Naked Choke)	1	3:33
	Yudai Aoyama	def.	Tatsuro Ikehata	Submission (Armbar)	1	1:45
	Ryota Masuda	def.	Chuichiro Takahashi	Decision (Unanimous)	2	3:00
	Ryuta Aiko	def.	Tomoharu Toda	TKO (Punches)	1	1:23
	Hiroyuki Hara	def.	Ben Henry	Decision (Unanimous)	1	5:00
	Noboru Chida	def.	Masaki Kobuchi	TKO (Punches)	1	2:39
	Yoshiyuki Ishikawa	def.	Yuya Ito	TKO (Punches)	1	2:03
	Kazuyoshi Kiyama	def.	Satoshi Usui	Decision (Unanimous)	1	5:00

== Pancrase: Passion Tour 5 ==
Pancrase: Passion Tour 5 was an event held on June 5, 2010, at The Differ Ariake Arena in Tokyo, Japan.

=== Results ===
Main Card
Weight class				Method	Round	Time	Notes
Welterweight	Kengo Ura	def.	Keiichiro Yamamiya	Decision (Split)	3	5:00	(Note: For the Pancrase Welterweight Championship.)
	Satoru Kitaoka	def.	Jorge Rodrigues Silva	Decision (Unanimous)	3	5:00
	Eriya Matsuda	def.	Yoshifumi Dogaki	TKO (Punches)	1	3:34
	Masaya Takita	vs.	Shigeyuki Uchiyama	NC (Uchiyama's Ear Torn by Rope)	2	2:57
	Ryosuke Tanuma	def.	Takuya Eizumi	Decision (Unanimous)	2	5:00
	Takumi Murata	def.	Ryota Sasaki	Decision (Unanimous)	2	5:00
	Yuhei Fukuda	def.	Jason Symak	TKO (Corner Stoppage)	1	4:44
	Yuichiro Yajima	def.	Narongchai Dragontail	Technical Submission (Keylock)	1	2:15
	Shigenobu Takahashi	def.	Junichi Ota	KO (Punches)	1	1:39
	Juntaro Ami	def.	Keigo Hirayama	Decision (Split)	2	5:00
	Motoshi Miyaji	def.	Kensaku Nakamura	Submission (Triangle Choke)	2	0:42
	Masakazu Takafuji	def.	Hiroshi Tomita	TKO (Knee and Punches)	2	0:13
	Yuki Uejima	def.	Shoko Sato	Decision (Unanimous)	2	5:00
	Motonobu Tezuka	def.	Yuta Numakura	Decision (Unanimous)	2	5:00
	Yoshihiro Matsunaga	def.	Go Yamanaka	Decision (Unanimous)	2	5:00
	Hiroyuki Nakajima	def.	Daichi Kitakata	Decision (Unanimous)	2	5:00
	Masaaki Hasegawa	vs.	Yudai Aoyama	Draw	2	5:00

== Pancrase: Passion Tour 6 ==
Pancrase: Passion Tour 6 was an event held on July 4, 2010, at The Differ Ariake Arena in Tokyo, Japan.

=== Results ===
Main Card
Weight class				Method	Round	Time	Notes
Middleweight	Yuki Kondo (c)	vs.	Yuji Hisamatsu	Draw	3	5:00	(Note: For the Pancrase Middleweight Championship.)
Super Flyweight	Kiyotaka Shimizu (c)	def.	Isao Hirose	TKO (Doctor Stoppage)	2	3:06	(Note: For the Pancrase Super Flyweight Championship.)
	Isao Kobayashi	vs.	Tomoyoshi Iwamiya	Draw	2	5:00
	Tashiro Nishiuchi	def.	Ho Leung Kim	Submission (Arm-Triangle Choke)	1	4:01
	Keitaro Maeda	def.	Seok Mo Kim	Decision (Unanimous)	2	5:00
	Yuta Nakamura	def.	Kosei Kubota	TKO (Punches)	1	2:08
	Ryo Saito	def.	Yoshiyuki Ishikawa	TKO (Soccer Kicks)	1	4:31
	Ryosuke Togashi	def.	Koji Obata	Decision (Majority)	1	5:00
	Ryota Masuda	def.	Masaomi Saito	Submission (Rear-Naked Choke)	1	1:59

== Pancrase: Passion Tour 7 ==
Pancrase: Passion Tour 7 was an event held on August 8, 2010, at The Differ Ariake Arena in Tokyo, Japan.

=== Results ===
Main Card
Weight class				Method	Round	Time	Notes
	Keiichiro Yamamiya	def.	Hoon Kim	Decision (Majority)	2	5:00
	Sojiro Orui	def.	Ichiro Kanai	Decision (Majority)	2	5:00
	Tomonari Kanomata	def.	Takayoshi Ono	TKO (Punches)	2	3:40
	Masahiro Oishi	def.	Takumi Murata	Submission (Triangle Choke)	1	3:34
	Kiichi Kunimoto	vs.	Seiki Ryo	Draw	2	5:00
	Ryota Sasaki	vs.	Kentaro Imaizumi	Draw	2	5:00
	Hiroki Aoki	def.	Hiroyuki Nozawa	KO (Punch)	1	0:30
	Felipe Enomoto	def.	Taku Aramaki	Decision (Majority)	2	5:00
	Juntaro Ami	def.	Shigenobu Takahashi	Submission (Rear-Naked Choke)	1	1:05
	Motoshi Miyaji	def.	Masakazu Takafuji	DQ (Accidental Knee to the Groin)	1	0:26
	Motonobu Tezuka	def.	Yuki Uejima	Submission (Armbar)	1	2:11
	Hiroyuki Nakajima	def.	Yoshihiro Matsunaga	Decision (Unanimous)	2	5:00
	Akihiro Ono	vs.	Daisuke Shimoyama	Draw	2	5:00
	Yusuke Kawanago	def.	Yoji Saito	KO (Punch)	1	4:30
	Kensaku Nakamura	def.	Norifumi Aihara	Decision (Unanimous)	2	5:00
	Koichiro Takekawa	def.	Daisuke Sato	TKO (Punches)	1	1:10
	Koichi Sugai	vs.	Masaaki Hasegawa	Draw	2	5:00
	Katsuhiko Nomura	def.	Tomoharu Toda	Submission (Kimura)	1	1:04
	Chuichiro Takahashi	vs.	Nobuki Fujii	Draw	2	5:00
	Kenichi Ogura	def.	Yudai Aoyama	Technical Submission (Kimura)	2	4:08
	Sota Kojima	vs.	Tsukasa Arai	Draw	2	5:00

== Pancrase: Passion Tour 8 ==
Pancrase: Passion Tour 8 was an event held on September 5, 2010, at The Differ Ariake Arena in Tokyo, Japan.

=== Results ===
Main Card
Weight class				Method	Round	Time	Notes
Light Heavyweight	Yuji Sakuragi	def.	Ryo Kawamura (c)	TKO (Punches)	1	3:55	(Note: For the Pancrase Light Heavyweight Championship.)
Bantamweight	Manabu Inoue (c)	def.	Tashiro Nishiuchi	Decision (Majority)	3	5:00	(Note: For the Pancrase Bantamweight Championship.)
	Tomomi Sunaba	def.	Monica Lovato	Decision (Unanimous)	2	5:00
	Mitsuhisa Sunabe	def.	Noboru Tahara	KO (Slam)	3	2:32
	Masahiro Toryu	def.	Akihiro Yamazaki	KO (Head Kick)	3	0:40
	Daisuke Hanazawa	def.	Eriya Matsuda	Submission (Kimura)	2	1:55
	Kenji Arai	vs.	Soyu Tanabe	Draw	2	5:00
	Masaomi Saito	def.	Hideo Matsui	Submission (Rear-Naked Choke)	1	1:29
	Kentaro Abe	vs.	Shigeaki Kusayanagi	Draw	2	5:00

== Pancrase: 2010 Pro-Am Open Catch Wrestling Tournament ==
Pancrase: 2010 Pro-Am Open Catch Wrestling Tournament was an event held on September 19, 2010, at The Gold's Gym South Tokyo Annex in Tokyo, Japan.

=== Results ===
Main Card
Weight class				Method	Round	Time	Notes
	Takashi Ito	def.	Norifumi Aihara	TKO (Punches)	2	4:00
	Yoshiyuki Ishikawa	def.	Yuta Numakura	TKO (Punches)	1	1:21

== Pancrase: Gate 6th Chance ==
Pancrase: Gate 6th Chance was an event held on September 19, 2010, at The Gold's Gym South Tokyo Annex in Tokyo, Japan.

=== Results ===
Main Card
Weight class				Method	Round	Time	Notes
	Wataru Sasaki	def.	Kenta Okuyama	Decision (Unanimous)	2	3:00
	Jon Shores	def.	Akihito Hara	Decision (Unanimous)	2	3:00
	Nobuki Fujii	def.	Junro Kubota	KO (Punch)	1	2:49
	Yudai Aoyama	def.	Ryota Masuda	TKO (Punches)	1	0:51
	Taito Kubota	def.	Mokichi Yazawa	Decision (Majority)	1	5:00
	Hiroyuki Hayashi	def.	Noboru Chida	TKO (Punches)	1	0:32
	Yoshihito Kuroki	def.	Makoto Kawawa	Submission (Armbar)	1	1:31
	Shogo Ohashi	def.	Junya Nishikawa	DQ (Kick to the Groin)	2	0:47
	Koichiro Takekawa	def.	Toru Kanamori	TKO (Punches)	1	2:37
	Kenta Okuyama	def.	Arata Fujimoto	Submission (Heel Hook)	1	1:31
	Wataru Sasaki	def.	Yuki Otaka	TKO (Punches)	1	3:52
	Jon Shores	def.	Daiei Lee	KO (Punch)	1	0:06
	Akihito Hara	def.	Koji Obata	Decision (Majority)	1	5:00
	Nobuki Fujii	def.	Yuki Terashima	TKO (Punches)	1	3:10
	Junro Kubota	def.	Satoru Takahashi	Decision (Majority)	1	5:00
	Ryota Masuda	def.	Atsushi Masukura	Submission (Kimura)	1	2:52
	Yudai Aoyama	def.	Yojin Iwara	Decision (Unanimous)	1	5:00
	Mokichi Yazawa	def.	Isamu Odagiri	Decision (Unanimous)	1	5:00
	Taito Kubota	def.	Yuya Ito	Decision (Unanimous)	1	5:00
	Hiroyuki Hayashi	def.	Masaki Kobuchi	TKO (Punches)	1	0:30
	Noboru Chida	def.	Kazuyoshi Kiyama	Decision (Unanimous)	1	5:00

== Pancrase: Passion Tour 9 ==
Pancrase: Passion Tour 9 was an event held on October 3, 2010, at The Differ Ariake Arena in Tokyo, Japan.

=== Results ===
Main Card
Weight class				Method	Round	Time	Notes
	Satoru Kitaoka	def.	Kuniyoshi Hironaka	Submission (Guillotine Choke)	2	4:22
	Takafumi Ito	def.	Sabou Miruchya	Submission (Rear-Naked Choke)	1	3:19
	Shigeki Osawa	def.	Masaomi Saito	TKO (Punches)	1	1:42
	Takenori Sato	def.	Yuta Nakamura	Submission (Kimura)	2	0:34
	Hiroshi Tomita	def.	Yuki Uejima	Decision (Unanimous)	2	5:00
	Hayato Sato	vs.	Yoshihiro Matsunaga	Draw	2	5:00
	Hiroki Nagaoka	def.	Ryosuke Togashi	Decision (Unanimous)	2	5:00
	Yusuke Kawanago	def.	Masaki Yanagisawa	KO (Soccer Kick)	2	0:51
	Katsuhiko Nomura	def.	Kenichi Ogura	Technical Submission (Armbar)	1	0:53
	Chikara Shimabukuro	def.	Tsukasa Arai	Submission (Triangle Choke)	1	4:49
	Sota Kojima	vs.	Takamasa Kiuchi	Draw	2	5:00

== Pancrase: Passion Tour 10 ==
Pancrase: Passion Tour 10 was an event held on November 3, 2010, at The Differ Ariake Arena in Tokyo, Japan.

=== Results ===
Main Card
Weight class				Method	Round	Time	Notes
	Isao Kobayashi	def.	Artur Oumakhanov	Technical Submission (Guillotine Choke)	1	4:21
	Tomonari Kanomata	vs.	Shigeki Osawa	Draw (Unanimous)	3	5:00
	Kosei Kubota	vs.	Masahiro Toryu	Draw (Unanimous)	2	5:00
	Sojiro Orui	def.	Yuji Hisamatsu	TKO (Punches)	2	2:19
	Hiroki Aoki	vs.	Tetsuya Yamada	Draw (Unanimous)	2	5:00
	Hiroyuki Nakajima	def.	Isao Hirose	Submission (Rear-Naked Choke)	2	3:42
	Masahiro Oishi	def.	Hirokazu Nishimura	TKO (Corner Stoppage)	2	3:46
	Ryota Sasaki	def.	Ryo Saito	TKO (Punches)	2	2:35
	Kenichi Serizawa	def.	Taku Aramaki	Submission (Armbar)	1	2:15
	Junichi Ota	def.	Daisuke Shimoyama	Decision (Unanimous)	2	5:00
	Takashi Ito	def.	Katsuhiko Nomura	Decision (Unanimous)	2	5:00
	Nobuhiro Yoshitake	def.	Yoshiyuki Ishikawa	TKO (Punches)	1	3:58
	Daisuke Tsujita	def.	Takashi Nakamura	Submission (Armbar)	2	1:16
	Masakazu Utsugi	def.	Go Yamanaka	Submission (Punches)	1	2:14

== Pancrase: Passion Tour 11 ==
Pancrase: Passion Tour 11 was an event held on December 5, 2010, at The Differ Ariake Arena in Tokyo, Japan.

=== Results ===
Main Card
Weight class				Method	Round	Time	Notes
Light Heavyweight	Yuji Sakuragi	vs.	Ryo Kawamura (c)	Draw	3	5:00	(Note: For the Pancrase Light Heavyweight Championship.)
Middleweight	Rikuhei Fujii	def.	Yuki Kondo (c)	Decision (Unanimous)	3	5:00	(Note: For the Pancrase Middleweight Championship.)
Super Flyweight	Kiyotaka Shimizu (c)	vs.	Mitsuhisa Sunabe	Draw	3	5:00	(Note: For the Pancrase Super Flyweight Championship.)
	Tomonari Kanomata	def.	Kenji Arai	Technical Submission (Rear-Naked Choke)	1	0:24
	Masahiro Toryu	def.	Keiichiro Yamamiya	KO (Head Kick)	1	4:51
	Koji Oishi	vs.	Katsuhiko Nagata	Draw	2	5:00
	Tomomi Sunaba	def.	Akiko Naito	Decision (Majority)	2	5:00
	Seiki Ryo	def.	Daisuke Watanabe	TKO (Punches)	1	0:28
	Takenori Sato	def.	Shingo Suzuki	Decision (Unanimous)	3	5:00
	Yusuke Masuda	def.	Yuhei Fukuda	Decision (Unanimous)	2	5:00
	Kazuki Tokudome	def.	Shigenobu Takahashi	TKO (Punches)	1	3:33
	Junichi Ota	def.	Akihiro Ono	Submission (Armbar)	1	2:56
	Ryosuke Togashi	def.	Koichiro Takekawa	TKO (Punches)	1	3:42
	Yusuke Kawanago	def.	Masaomi Saito	Decision (Majority)	2	5:00
	Kensaku Nakamura	def.	Takashi Ito	Decision (Split)	2	5:00
	Jon Shores	def.	Wataru Sasaki	Submission (Guillotine Choke)	1	3:07
	Yudai Aoyama	def.	Nobuki Fujii	Decision (Unanimous)	1	5:00
	Yasuto Taito	def.	Hiroki Hayashi	Decision (Unanimous)	1	5:00
	Chikara Shimabukuro	vs.	Takamasa Kiuchi	Draw	2	5:00

== Pancrase: Passion Tour 12 ==
Pancrase: Passion Tour 12 was an event held on December 19, 2010, at Azelea Taisho Hall in Osaka, Osaka, Japan.

=== Results ===
Main Card
Weight class				Method	Round	Time	Notes
	Daisuke Hanazawa	def.	Juntaro Ami	Submission (Arm-Triangle Choke)	1	3:43
	Motonobu Tezuka	def.	Takumi Murata	Decision (Unanimous)	2	5:00
	Takafumi Ito	vs.	Yoshifumi Dogaki	Draw (Majority)	2	5:00
	Hiroshi Tomita	def.	Nobuhiro Yamauchi	KO (Punches)	1	4:47
	Nobuhiro Yoshitake	vs.	Hiroyuki Tsuzuki	Draw (Unanimous)	2	5:00
	Daichi Kitakata	def.	Shinobu Aoyama	TKO (Punches)	1	4:05
	Takahiro Kajita	vs.	Hisaki Hiraishi	Draw (Unanimous)	2	5:00
	Tadahiro Harada	def.	Takayoshi Ono	Submission (Triangle Choke)	1	2:44
	Takuto Matsumoto	def.	Makoto Ishimura	TKO (Punches)	1	2:37
	Takeshi Takano	def.	Masakazu Yamaguchi	TKO (Punches)	1	1:30
	Yosuke Morita	def.	Norihiko Hasegawa	TKO (Punches)	1	1:35
	Hisanori Toyokawa	def.	Daiki Nakahara	Submission (Triangle Choke)	1	4:28

== See also ==
- Pancrase
- List of Pancrase champions
- List of Pancrase events
