= Takenori Sato =

Japanese mixed martial artist

- Born: June 8, 1985 (age 41); Akita, Akita, Japan
- Native name: 佐藤 豪則
- Other names: "The Successor of Saku-ism"
- Nationality: Japanese
- Height: 5 ft 10 in (1.78 m)
- Weight: 170 lb (77 kg; 12 st)
- Division: Welterweight (2010-present); Middleweight
- Reach: 71 in (180 cm)
- Style: Catch Wrestling, Judo, Sumo
- Stance: Southpaw
- Team: Laughter7
- Rank: 2nd dan black belt in Judo

Mixed martial arts record
- Total: 41
- Wins: 20
- By knockout: 3
- By submission: 8
- By decision: 9
- Losses: 12
- By knockout: 7
- By decision: 5
- Draws: 7
- No contests: 2

Other information
- Mixed martial arts record from Sherdog

Takenori Sato (佐藤豪則, Satō Takenori; born June 8, 1985) is a Japanese professional mixed martial artist.

== Mixed martial arts career ==
=== Japan ===
Sato has been a follower of Kazushi Sakuraba. Sato left the Takada Dojo with Sakuraba in April 2006, and was one of the initial members of the gym Laughter7 that was founded by Sakuraba in September 2007.

Sato made his professional MMA debut in December 2004 when he fought and won three times in the Deep 2004 Future King tournament. Over the next five years, he fought in several organizations in Japan including Cage Force, Demolition, K-1 Hero's, Pancrase and Sengoku, where he faced Joe Doerksen at Sengoku 10.

In 2009 and 2010, Sato fought against Izuru Takeuchi and Yuki Kondo for the Pancrase middleweight championship, resulting in a draw and loss respectively. A year later in 2011, he faced Kengo Ura for the title again and won. He successfully defended the belt six times before joining the Ultimate Fighting Championship.

=== Ultimate Fighting Championship ===
Sato made his UFC debut against Erick Silva on February 15, 2014 at UFC Fight Night 36, replacing an injured Nate Loughran. He lost the fight via TKO early in the first round.

Sato faced Hyun Gyu Lim on September 20, 2014 at UFC Fight Night 52. He lost the fight via TKO in the first round and was subsequently released from the organization.

== Championships and accomplishments ==
Mixed martial arts

- Pancrase
  - Welterweight King of Pancrase (One time)
  - Six Successful Title Defenses
- Deep
  - Deep 2004 –82 kg class Future King tournament winner

== Mixed martial arts record ==
Professional record breakdown
41 matches	20 wins	12 losses
By knockout	3	7
By submission	8	0
By decision	9	5
Draws	7	
No contests	2	

Res.	Record	Opponent	Method	Event	Date	Round	Time	Location	Notes
Win	20–12–7 (2)	Yuki Kondo	Decision (unanimous)	Pancrase 335	July 9, 2023	3	5:00	Tokyo, Japan	
Loss	19–12–7 (2)	Arman Tsarukyan	Decision (unanimous)	MFP 214 - Governor's Cup 2017	December 2, 2017	3	5:00	Khabarovsk, Russia	
NC	19–11–7 (2)	Sung Chan Hong	NC (accidental groin kick)	TFC 15 - Top FC 15	July 22, 2017	5	N/A	Seoul, South Korea	
NC	19–11–7 (1)	Sung Chan Hong	NC (accidental kick to groin)	TFC 12 - Top FC 12	September 11, 2016	1	N/A	Seoul, South Korea	
Win	19–11–7	Kyung Soo Park	Submission (armbar)	Kunlun Fight - Cage Fight Series 5 / Top FC 11	May 22, 2016	1	1:30	Seoul, South Korea	
Loss	18–11–7	Han Seul Kim	Decision (unanimous)	TOP FC 10	March 19, 2016	3	5:00	Seoul, South Korea	
Win	18–10–7	Chad Reiner	Submission (armbar)	PRO Fighting 10	May 9, 2015	1	2:20	Taipei, Taiwan	
Loss	17–10–7	Hyun Gyu Lim	KO (elbows)	UFC Fight Night: Hunt vs. Nelson	September 20, 2014	1	1:18	Saitama, Japan	
Loss	17–9–7	Erick Silva	KO (punches)	UFC Fight Night: Machida vs. Mousasi	February 15, 2014	1	0:52	Jaraguá do Sul, Brazil	
Win	17–8–7	Islam Galayev	Submission (kimura)	Deep: Tribe Tokyo Fight	October 20, 2013	2	2:08	Tokyo, Japan	
Win	16–8–7	Shingo Suzuki	Submission (keylock)	Pancrase: 247	May 19, 2013	3	2:36	Tokyo, Japan	Defended the Pancrase Welterweight Championship.
Draw	15–8–7	Akihiro Murayama	Draw (unanimous)	Pancrase: 246	March 17, 2013	3	5:00	Tokyo, Japan	Retained the Pancrase Welterweight Championship.
Win	15–8–6	Keiichiro Yamamiya	Decision (unanimous)	Pancrase: Progress Tour 10	September 1, 2012	3	5:00	Tokyo, Japan	Defended the Pancrase Welterweight Championship.
Win	14–8–6	Kiichi Kunimoto	Decision (unanimous)	Pancrase: Progress Tour 3	March 11, 2012	3	5:00	Tokyo, Japan	Defended the Pancrase Welterweight Championship.
Draw	13–8–6	Eiji Ishikawa	Draw (split)	Pancrase: Impressive Tour 10	October 2, 2011	3	5:00	Tokyo, Japan	Retained the Pancrase Welterweight Championship.
Win	13–8–5	Sojiro Orui	Decision (unanimous)	Pancrase: Impressive Tour 5	June 5, 2011	3	5:00	Tokyo, Japan	Defended the Pancrase Welterweight Championship.
Win	12–8–5	Kengo Ura	Technical Submission (kimura)	Pancrase: Impressive Tour 1	February 6, 2011	1	4:40	Tokyo, Japan	Won the Pancrase Welterweight Championship.
Win	11–8–5	Shingo Suzuki	Decision (unanimous)	Pancrase: Passion Tour 11	December 5, 2010	3	5:00	Tokyo, Japan	
Win	10–8–5	Yuta Nakamura	Submission (kimura)	Pancrase: Passion Tour 9	October 3, 2010	2	0:34	Tokyo, Japan	
Loss	9–8–5	Keiichiro Yamamiya	Decision (majority)	Pancrase: Passion Tour 3	April 4, 2010	2	5:00	Tokyo, Japan	Welterweight debut.
Loss	9–7–5	Yuki Kondo	Decision (unanimous)	Pancrase: Passion Tour 1	February 7, 2010	3	5:00	Tokyo, Japan	
Loss	9–6–5	Joe Doerksen	TKO (punches)	World Victory Road Presents: Sengoku 10	September 23, 2009	2	4:27	Saitama, Japan	
Draw	9–5–5	Izuru Takeuchi	Draw	Pancrase: Changing Tour 4	August 8, 2009	3	5:00	Tokyo, Japan	For the Pancrase Middleweight Championship.
Win	9–5–4	Hoon Kim	Submission (armbar)	Pancrase: Changing Tour 3	June 7, 2009	1	4:26	Tokyo, Japan	
Win	8–5–4	Ichiro Kanai	Decision (majority)	Pancrase: Changing Tour 2	April 5, 2009	2	5:00	Tokyo, Japan	
Win	7–5–4	Rikuhei Fujii	Decision (unanimous)	Cage Force EX Eastern Bound	November 8, 2008	3	5:00	Tokyo, Japan	
Win	6–5–4	Yuji Hisamatsu	Decision (unanimous)	Pancrase: Shining 8	October 1, 2008	2	5:00	Tokyo, Japan	
Loss	5–5–4	Young Choi	Decision (majority)	Deep: 36 Impact	July 27, 2008	2	5:00	Osaka, Japan	
Draw	5–4–4	Masahiro Toryu	Draw	Pancrase: Shining 2	March 26, 2008	2	5:00	Tokyo, Japan	
Loss	5–4–3	Yukiya Naito	TKO (doctor stoppage)	Cage Force 5	December 1, 2007	1	4:45	Tokyo, Japan	
Win	5–3–3	Kenji Nagai	Submission (armbar)	K-1 HERO's: Tournament Final	September 17, 2007	1	2:46	Kanagawa, Japan	
Draw	4–3–3	Yuji Hisamatsu	Draw	Cage Force 3	June 9, 2007	2	5:00	Tokyo, Japan	
Loss	4–3–2	Yusaku Tsukumo	KO (punch)	Demolition	December 10, 2006	2	0:18	Tokyo, Japan	
Draw	4–2–2	Tetsuo Seto	Draw	Demolition	July 30, 2006	2	5:00	Tokyo, Japan	
Draw	4–2–1	Ken Hamamura	Draw	Deep: 20th Impact	September 3, 2005	2	5:00	Tokyo, Japan	
Loss	4–2	Ken Hamamura	TKO (punches)	Deep: clubDeep Toyama: Barbarian Festival 2	May 15, 2005	1	0:21	Toyama, Japan	
Win	4–1	Marlon Medeiros	TKO (punches)	Deep: Hero 1	April 17, 2005	1	4:21	Aichi, Japan	
Loss	3–1	Kosuke Umeda	TKO (corner stoppage)	Deep: 18th Impact	February 12, 2005	1	0:35	Tokyo, Japan	
Win	3–0	Moriyuki Yamada	Decision (unanimous)	Deep: 17th Impact	December 18, 2004	2	5:00	Tokyo, Japan	Deep 2004 Future King tournament final
Win	2–0	Ryo Nakajima	TKO (punches)	Deep: 17th Impact	December 18, 2004	2	2:03	Tokyo, Japan	Deep 2004 Future King tournament semifinal
Win	1–0	Shichi Maru	TKO (punches)	Deep: 17th Impact	December 18, 2004	2	1:00	Tokyo, Japan	Deep 2004 Future King tournament quarterfinal
