= 2011 in Pancrase =

Mixed martial arts events

Information
- First date: January 30, 2011
- Last date: December 3, 2011

Events
- Total events: 15

Fights
- Total fights: 252
- Title fights: 7

Chronology
2010 in Pancrase	2011 in Pancrase	2012 in Pancrase

2011 was the 19th year in the history of Pancrase, a mixed martial arts promotion based in Japan. 15 events were held, beginning with Pancrase: Gate 7th Chance.

== Title fights ==
Title fights in 2011
Weight class				Method	Round	Time	Event	Notes
Welterweight	Takenori Sato	def.	Kengo Ura (c)	Technical Submission (Kimura)	1	4:40	Pancrase: Impressive Tour 1	(Note: For the Pancrase Welterweight Championship.)
Lightweight	Koji Oishi	def.	Daisuke Hanazawa	Decision (Unanimous)	3	5:00	Pancrase: Impressive Tour 4	(Note: For the Pancrase Lightweight Championship.)
Welterweight	Takenori Sato (c)	def.	Sojiro Orui	Decision (Unanimous)	3	5:00	Pancrase: Impressive Tour 5	(Note: For the Pancrase Welterweight Championship.)
Super Flyweight	Kiyotaka Shimizu	def.	Mitsuhisa Sunabe (c)	Decision (Majority)	3	5:00	Pancrase: Impressive Tour 5	(Note: For the Pancrase Super Flyweight Championship.)
Featherweight	Takumi Nakayama	def.	Tomonari Kanomata	Decision (Unanimous)	3	5:00	Pancrase: Impressive Tour 9	(Note: For the Pancrase Featherweight Championship.)
Bantamweight	Shintaro Ishiwatari	def.	Manabu Inoue (c)	Decision (Majority)	3	5:00	Pancrase: Impressive Tour 13	(Note: For the Pancrase Bantamweight Championship.)
Flyweight	Mitsuhisa Sunabe	def.	Hiroyuki Abe	TKO (Punches)	3	4:10	Pancrase: Impressive Tour 13	(Note: For the Pancrase Flyweight Championship.)

== Events list ==
#	Event title	Date	Arena	Location
249	Pancrase: Impressive Tour 13	December 3, 2011	Differ Ariake Arena	Tokyo, Japan
248	Pancrase: Impressive Tour 12	November 27, 2011	Azalea Taisho Hall	Osaka, Osaka, Japan
247	Pancrase: Impressive Tour 11	November 12, 2011	Shinjuku Face	Tokyo, Japan
246	Pancrase: Impressive Tour 10	October 2, 2011	Differ Ariake Arena	Tokyo, Japan
245	Pancrase: Impressive Tour 9	September 4, 2011	Differ Ariake Arena	Tokyo, Japan
244	Pancrase: Impressive Tour 8	August 7, 2011	Differ Ariake Arena	Tokyo, Japan
243	Pancrase: Impressive Tour 7	July 31, 2011	Azalea Taisho Hall	Osaka, Osaka, Japan
242	Pancrase: Impressive Tour 6	July 23, 2011	Shinjuku Face	Tokyo, Japan
241	Pancrase: Gate 8th Chance	July 10, 2011	Gold's Gym South Tokyo Annex	Tokyo, Japan
240	Pancrase: Impressive Tour 5	June 5, 2011	Differ Ariake Arena	Tokyo, Japan
239	Pancrase: Impressive Tour 4	May 3, 2011	Differ Ariake Arena	Tokyo, Japan
238	Pancrase: Impressive Tour 3	April 3, 2011	Differ Ariake Arena	Tokyo, Japan
237	Pancrase: Impressive Tour 2	March 13, 2011	Azalea Taisho Hall	Osaka, Osaka, Japan
236	Pancrase: Impressive Tour 1	February 6, 2011	Differ Ariake Arena	Tokyo, Japan
235	Pancrase: Gate 7th Chance	January 30, 2011	Gold's Gym South Tokyo Annex	Tokyo, Japan

== Pancrase: Gate 7th Chance ==
Pancrase: Gate 7th Chance was an event held on January 30, 2011, at The Gold's Gym South Tokyo Annex in Tokyo, Japan.

=== Results ===
Main Card
Weight class				Method	Round	Time	Notes
	Shogo Ohashi	def.	Jun Matsuyama	TKO (Punches)	1	4:11
	Isamu Nagase	def.	Kiriro Mano	TKO (Punches)	1	0:28
	Manabu Hirayama	def.	Genki Osako	TKO (Punches)	1	0:29
	Takatoshi Matsumoto	def.	Masaaki Hasegawa	Decision (Majority)	1	5:00
	Nobuki Fujii	def.	Chuichiro Takahashi	Decision (Unanimous)	1	5:00
	Koji Obata	def.	Junro Kubota	Decision (Unanimous)	1	5:00
	Kenichi Tosa	def.	Yukio Kishi	Decision (Unanimous)	1	5:00
	Noboru Chida	def.	Yusuke Kitago	DQ	1	1:05
	Jun Matsuyama	def.	Junya Nishikawa	KO (Punch)	1	0:54
	Shogo Ohashi	def.	Chohei Kimura	Decision (Majority)	1	5:00
	Kiriro Mano	def.	Go Hishinuma	Decision (Unanimous)	1	5:00
	Isamu Nagase	def.	Yoshihisa Nakamura	Decision (Unanimous)	1	5:00
	Genki Osako	def.	Osamu Takashina	Decision (Majority)	1	5:00
	Manabu Hirayama	def.	Takehito Noguchi	Submission (Heel Hook)	1	4:02
	Takatoshi Matsumoto	def.	Akihito Hara	Decision (Unanimous)	2	3:00
	Masaaki Hasegawa	def.	Asim Matsuki	TKO (Punches)	1	3:06
	Nobuki Fujii	def.	Yasufumi Suzaki	Decision (Split)	1	5:00
	Koji Obata	def.	Tatsuro Ikehata	Decision (Unanimous)	1	5:00
	Junro Kubota	def.	Yojin Iwara	Decision (Unanimous)	1	5:00
	Kenichi Tosa	def.	Masaki Kobuchi	Decision (Unanimous)	1	5:00
	Yukio Kishi	def.	Keigo Kawamoto	Decision (Unanimous)	1	5:00
	Noboru Chida	def.	Hiroyuki Tamura	Decision (Unanimous)	2	3:00
	Takamasa Kiuchi	def.	Sota Kojima	Decision (Unanimous)	2	3:00
	Chikara Shimabukuro	def.	Atsushi Makigaya	Decision (Majority)	1	5:00

== Pancrase: Impressive Tour 1 ==
Pancrase: Impressive Tour 1 was an event held on February 6, 2011, at The Differ Ariake Arena in Tokyo, Japan.

=== Results ===
Main Card
Weight class				Method	Round	Time	Notes
Welterweight	Takenori Sato	def.	Kengo Ura (c)	Technical Submission (Kimura)	1	4:40	(Note: For the Pancrase Welterweight Championship.)
	Eiji Ishikawa	def.	Masahiro Toryu	Decision (Majority)	3	5:00
	Hiroki Nagaoka	def.	Yuki Kondo	Decision (Unanimous)	2	5:00
	Seiya Kawahara	def.	Takumi Murata	TKO (Punches)	2	3:07
	Tomonari Kanomata	def.	Motoshi Miyaji	Decision (Unanimous)	2	5:00
	Keiichiro Yamamiya	vs.	Kosei Kubota	Draw	2	5:00
	Tashiro Nishiuchi	def.	Shoko Sato	Decision (Majority)	2	5:00
	Masahiro Oishi	vs.	Masaya Takita	Draw	2	5:00
	Akihito Tanaka	def.	Yuhei Fukuda	Decision (Unanimous)	2	5:00
	Yoshihiro Matsunaga	def.	Takuya Eizumi	Decision (Unanimous)	2	5:00
	Isao Hirose	def.	Hayato Sato	Submission (Rear-Naked Choke)	2	1:43
	Kazuki Tokudome	def.	Junichi Ota	TKO (Punches)	1	2:55
	Tatsuhiko Nishizaka	def.	Tamotsu Kitada	TKO (Doctor Stoppage)	1	4:07
	Shigenobu Takahashi	def.	Daisuke Shimoyama	Submission (Armbar)	2	1:32
	Ryota Masuda	def.	Norifumi Aihara	TKO (Punches)	2	3:04
	Jon Shores	def.	Yoji Saito	Decision (Unanimous)	2	5:00
	Takashi Ito	vs.	Akihiro Sakurai	Draw	2	5:00
	Hayato Shimizu	def.	Shohei Kondo	Submission (Arm-Triangle Choke)	2	3:51
	Daisuke Tsujita	def.	Yasuto Taito	Submission (Heel Hook)	1	2:35

== Pancrase: Impressive Tour 2 ==
Pancrase: Impressive Tour 2 was an event held on March 13, 2011, at The Azalea Taisho Hall in Osaka, Osaka, Japan.

=== Results ===
Main Card
Weight class				Method	Round	Time	Notes
	Motonobu Tezuka	def.	Hiroshi Tomita	Decision (Unanimous)	2	5:00
	Hitomi Akano	def.	Chisa Yonezawa	Submission (Armbar)	1	0:40
	Ikkei Nagamura	def.	Yuta Nakamura	KO (Punches)	2	4:13
	Daichi Kitakata	def.	Yuki Uejima	TKO (Punches)	2	3:16
	Hisaki Hiraishi	vs.	Yoshifumi Dogaki	Draw	2	5:00
	Fukuko Hamada	def.	Mamiko Mizoguchi	TKO (Punches)	2	4:45
	Yudai Aoyama	def.	Sho Nonaka	TKO (Punches)	1	0:31
	Mitsuki Yoshinaga	vs.	Takuto Matsumoto	Draw	2	5:00
	Hairi Hayashi	vs.	Ryo Oyama	Draw	2	5:00
	Yosuke Morita	vs.	Kazuya Kawabata	Draw	2	5:00
	Ryohei Tsujikawa	vs.	Takahiro Suzuki	Draw	2	5:00

== Pancrase: Impressive Tour 3 ==
Pancrase: Impressive Tour 3 was an event held on April 3, 2011, at The Differ Ariake Arena in Tokyo, Japan.

=== Results ===
Main Card
Weight class				Method	Round	Time	Notes
	Mei Yamaguchi	def.	Tomomi Sunaba	Decision (Majority)	2	5:00
	Takumi Nakayama	def.	Yusuke Kawanago	Submission (Rear-Naked Choke)	1	3:27
	Shingo Suzuki	def.	Seiki Ryo	KO (Punch)	1	0:45
	Hiroyuki Abe	def.	Takuma Ishii	Submission (Rear-Naked Choke)	2	2:11
	Kota Okazawa	def.	Juntaro Ami	Submission (Rear-Naked Choke)	2	2:46
	Masakazu Takafuji	def.	Masayoshi Ichikawa	Decision (Majority)	2	5:00
	Akihito Tanaka	def.	Yusuke Masuda	Decision (Split)	2	5:00
	Tatsuya So	def.	Ryota Sasaki	Decision (Unanimous)	2	5:00
	Keiji Sakuta	def.	Daisuke Shimoyama	Submission (Rear-Naked Choke)	1	2:12
	Koji Nakamura	def.	Koichiro Takekawa	TKO (Punches)	1	0:36
	Naoki Tajima	def.	Ryota Masuda	Decision (Unanimous)	2	5:00
	Jon Shores	def.	Akihiro Sakurai	Submission (Guillotine Choke)	2	1:38
	Yoji Saito	def.	Masaomi Saito	Submission (Rear-Naked Choke)	2	3:56
	Yuta Numakura	def.	Hirokazu Nishimura	Decision (Split)	2	5:00
	Yoshiyuki Ishikawa	def.	Takumi Shimazaki	Submission (Armbar)	1	2:11
	Yuki Yasunaga	def.	Daisuke Tsujita	Decision (Unanimous)	2	5:00
	Shogo Ohashi	def.	Isamu Nagase	Decision (Unanimous)	2	5:00
	Takatoshi Matsumoto	def.	Manabu Hirayama	Decision (Unanimous)	1	5:00
	Nobuki Fujii	def.	Koji Obata	Technical Submission (Armbar)	1	4:59
	Kenichi Tosa	def.	Noboru Chida	Decision (Unanimous)	1	5:00
	Chikara Shimabukuro	def.	Takamasa Kiuchi	Decision (Majority)	1	5:00

== Pancrase: Impressive Tour 4 ==
Pancrase: Impressive Tour 4 was an event held on May 3, 2011, at The Differ Ariake Arena in Tokyo, Japan.

=== Results ===
Main Card
Weight class				Method	Round	Time	Notes
Lightweight	Koji Oishi	def.	Daisuke Hanazawa	Decision (Unanimous)	3	5:00	(Note: For the Pancrase Lightweight Championship.)
	Manabu Inoue	def.	Seiya Kawahara	Decision (Majority)	3	5:00
	Eiji Ishikawa	def.	Ichiro Kanai	Decision (Majority)	3	5:00
	Tomonari Kanomata	def.	Masakazu Takafuji	Submission (Kimura)	1	4:08
	Masahiro Toryu	vs.	Hiroki Nagaoka	Draw	3	5:00
	Shintaro Ishiwatari	vs.	Tashiro Nishiuchi	Draw	3	5:00
	Kiichi Kunimoto	def.	Kengo Ura	Decision (Unanimous)	3	5:00
	Isao Kobayashi	def.	Yukinari Tamura	Decision (Split)	2	3:00
	Kota Okazawa	def.	Katsuya Inoue	KO (Punch)	1	2:42
	Kazuki Tokudome	def.	Hiroki Aoki	Decision (Unanimous)	3	5:00
	Mei Yamaguchi	def.	Akiko Naito	Submission (Armbar)	1	3:52
	Kenji Narita	vs.	Junpei Sasakawa	Draw	2	5:00
	Manabu Hirayama	vs.	Koichi Sugai	Draw	2	5:00
	Yasufumi Suzaki	vs.	Shun Fukazawa	Draw	2	5:00
	Yusuke Kitago	def.	Masaki Kobuchi	TKO (Punches)	2	0:13
	Isamu Odagiri	def.	Yasuyuki Moritake	Submission (Rear-Naked Choke)	2	2:04

== Pancrase: Impressive Tour 5 ==
Pancrase: Impressive Tour 5 was an event held on June 5, 2011, at The Differ Ariake Arena in Tokyo, Japan.

=== Results ===
Main Card
Weight class				Method	Round	Time	Notes
Welterweight	Takenori Sato (c)	def.	Sojiro Orui	Decision (Unanimous)	3	5:00	(Note: For the Pancrase Welterweight Championship.)
Super Flyweight	Kiyotaka Shimizu	def.	Mitsuhisa Sunabe (c)	Decision (Majority)	3	5:00	(Note: For the Pancrase Super Flyweight Championship.)
	Ryo Kawamura	vs.	Ikkei Nagamura	Draw	2	5:00
	Masanori Kanehara	def.	Motoshi Miyaji	KO (Punches)	2	0:09
	Shigeyuki Uchiyama	def.	Masaya Takita	Decision (Majority)	2	5:00
	Shingo Suzuki	vs.	Kosei Kubota	Draw	2	5:00
	Isao Hirose	vs.	Seiji Ozuka	Draw	2	5:00
	Kensaku Nakamura	vs.	Yusuke Kawanago	Draw	2	5:00
	Nobuhiro Yoshitake	def.	Ryo Saito	TKO (Punches)	2	1:14
	Junichi Ota	def.	Naoto Miyazaki	DQ (Knee to the Groin)	1	1:58
	Masayoshi Ichikawa	def.	Shinya Irei	TKO (Doctor Stoppage)	2	2:39
	Tamotsu Kitada	def.	Akihiro Ono	KO (Punch)	1	1:59
	Keiji Sakuta	def.	Koji Nakamura	Decision (Split)	2	5:00
	Takatoshi Matsumoto	def.	Ryosuke Togashi	Decision (Unanimous)	2	5:00
	Jon Shores	def.	Naoki Tajima	KO (Punch)	1	1:26
	Yoji Saito	def.	Nobuki Fujii	Decision (Unanimous)	2	5:00
	Yuta Numakura	def.	Yudai Aoyama	Decision (Split)	2	5:00
	Kenichi Tosa	def.	Yoshiyuki Ishikawa	TKO (Punches)	2	4:18
	Yuki Yasunaga	def.	Daichi Kitakata	Decision (Unanimous)	2	5:00
	Masakazu Utsugi	def.	Chikara Shimabukuro	TKO (Punches)	1	3:36

== Pancrase: Gate 8th Chance ==
Pancrase: Gate 8th Chance was an event held on July 10, 2011, at The Gold's Gym South Tokyo Annex in Tokyo, Japan.

=== Results ===
Main Card
Weight class				Method	Round	Time	Notes
	Junya Nishikawa	def.	Yu Kijima	Decision (Unanimous)	1	5:00
	Daryl Lokuku	def.	Junpei Sasakawa	TKO (Punches)	1	1:28
	Kensaku Kaneko	def.	Kentaro Yorimitsu	Decision (Unanimous)	1	5:00
	Shun Fukazawa	def.	Yasufumi Suzaki	Decision (Unanimous)	1	5:00
	Shiro Wakamatsu	def.	Rei Kawahara	Decision (Unanimous)	1	5:00
	Kosuke Terashima	def.	Toshihiro Komiya	Decision (Unanimous)	2	3:00
	Kenji Narita	vs.	Joshua Robison	Draw	2	5:00
	Takamasa Kiuchi	def.	Haruki Nakayama	Submission (Armbar)	1	2:53
	Yoshinari Shinba	def.	Tsukasa Arai	Submission (Armbar)	1	3:40
	Sota Kojima	vs.	Atsushi Makigaya	Draw	2	5:00
	Junya Nishikawa	def.	Yoshihisa Nakamura	Decision (Unanimous)	1	5:00
	Daryl Lokuku	def.	Nobuhito Sakurada	Decision (Unanimous)	2	3:00
	Junpei Sasakawa	def.	Go Hishinuma	Decision (Unanimous)	2	3:00
	Koichi Sugai	def.	Daiji Nakashima	DQ	1	0:41
	Akihito Hara	def.	Manabu Hirayama	KO (Punches)	1	2:16
	Kentaro Yorimitsu	def.	Satoru Takahashi	Submission (Guillotine Choke)	1	4:22
	Kensaku Kaneko	def.	Kiriro Mano	TKO (Punches)	1	5:00
	Yasufumi Suzaki	def.	Yojin Iwara	Decision (Majority)	1	5:00
	Shun Fukazawa	def.	Koji Obata	Decision (Unanimous)	1	5:00
	Shiro Wakamatsu	def.	Isao Takatsu	Decision (Unanimous)	1	5:00
	Rei Kawahara	def.	Junro Kubota	TKO (Punches)	1	4:47
	Kotaro Kazama	def.	Yusuke Kitago	DQ	1	2:26
	Kosuke Terashima	def.	Noboru Chida	Submission (Rear-Naked Choke)	1	1:34
	Hiroyuki Tamura	def.	Yasuyuki Moritake	Decision (Unanimous)	1	5:00
	Toshihiro Komiya	def.	Yukio Kishi	Decision (Unanimous)	1	5:00

== Pancrase: Impressive Tour 6 ==
Pancrase: Impressive Tour 6 was an event held on July 23, 2011, at The Shinjuku Face in Tokyo, Japan.

=== Results ===
Main Card
Weight class				Method	Round	Time	Notes
	Akihiro Yamazaki	def.	Hiroki Nagaoka	KO (Punch)	1	3:18
	Tomomi Sunaba	def.	Sadae Numata	Decision (Unanimous)	2	5:00
	Kensaku Nakamura	def.	Yo Saito	Decision (Majority)	2	5:00
	Shigenobu Takahashi	def.	Koichiro Takekawa	Decision (Unanimous)	2	5:00
	Yoshihito Kuroki	vs.	Yuhei Fukuda	Draw	2	5:00
	Kenji Nagaki	def.	Akihiro Ono	TKO (Punches)	2	2:40
	Daisuke Tsujita	def.	Goro Kobayashi	Submission (Triangle Choke)	1	3:37
	Go Yamanaka	vs.	Yuya Kaneuchi	Draw	2	5:00
	Akihiro Sakurai	def.	Ryota Masuda	Decision (Majority)	2	5:00
	Yukiko Seki	def.	Kimie Okada	Decision (Unanimous)	2	5:00
	Takashi Matsuoka	def.	Gaku Suwazono	TKO (Punches)	1	0:32
	Naohiro Takaoka	def.	Tatsuro Ikehata	TKO (Punches)	1	3:00
	Kirihito Kodama	def.	Satoshi Nakajima	KO (Punches)	1	3:50

== Pancrase: Impressive Tour 7 ==
Pancrase: Impressive Tour 7 was an event held on July 31, 2011, at The Azalea Taisho Hall in Osaka, Osaka, Japan.

=== Results ===
Main Card
Weight class				Method	Round	Time	Notes
	Takasuke Kume	def.	Masahiro Toryu	Submission (Rear-Naked Choke)	1	1:44
	Ikkei Nagamura	def.	Hidehira Yabu	Submission (Armbar)	1	2:41
	Hisaki Hiraishi	def.	Kenichi Serizawa	Decision (Unanimous)	2	5:00
	Nobuhiro Yoshitake	def.	Yudai Aoyama	Decision (Unanimous)	2	5:00
	Takumi Murata	vs.	Hiroshi Tomita	Draw	2	5:00
	Fukuko Hamada	def.	Yuko Kawabata	TKO (Punches)	1	2:30
	Yuki Uejima	def.	Yuya Ono	Technical Submission (Arm-Triangle Choke)	2	3:22
	Gael Dur	vs.	Yusuke Yoshida	Draw (Time Limit)	2	5:00
	Yutaro Kawaguchi	vs.	Toji Ueno	Draw	2	5:00
	Takuya Matsumori	vs.	Mitsuki Yoshinaga	Draw	2	5:00
	Kimitaka Kitagawa	vs.	Noriyoshi Wada	Draw	2	5:00
	Hiroshi Ando	vs.	Hiroyuki Norikiyo	Draw	2	5:00

== Pancrase: Impressive Tour 8 ==
Pancrase: Impressive Tour 8 was an event held on August 7, 2011, at The Differ Ariake Arena in Tokyo, Japan.

=== Results ===
Main Card
Weight class				Method	Round	Time	Notes
	Kazuki Tokudome	def.	Kota Okazawa	Decision (Unanimous)	3	5:00
	Isao Kobayashi	def.	Tomoyoshi Iwamiya	Decision (Unanimous)	3	5:00
	Shintaro Ishiwatari	def.	Motonobu Tezuka	Decision (Split)	3	5:00
	Keiichiro Yamamiya	def.	Ichiro Kanai	Decision (Majority)	2	5:00
	Mitsuhisa Sunabe	def.	Yoshihiro Matsunaga	Decision (Unanimous)	2	5:00
	Hiroyuki Abe	def.	Takuya Eizumi	Submission (Armbar)	1	4:19
	Shinsho Anzai	def.	Akihito Tanaka	TKO (Punches)	1	4:16
	Seiji Ozuka	def.	Isao Hirose	TKO (Punches)	2	0:57
	Tatsuya So	vs.	Shoko Sato	Draw (Majority)	2	5:00
	Yoshiaki Takahashi	def.	Koshi Matsumoto	Decision (Majority)	2	5:00
	Shigeaki Kusayanagi	def.	Tamotsu Kitada	TKO (Punches)	2	0:54
	Keiji Sakuta	def.	Takatoshi Matsumoto	Decision (Unanimous)	2	5:00
	Jon Shores	def.	Yoji Saito	Submission (Rear-Naked Choke)	1	4:43
	Yuta Numakura	def.	Kenichi Tosa	Decision (Unanimous)	2	5:00
	Yuki Yasunaga	def.	Masakazu Utsugi	Decision (Unanimous)	2	5:00
	Koji Nakamura	def.	Ryosuke Togashi	Decision (Unanimous)	2	5:00
	Naoki Tajima	def.	Hideo Matsui	TKO (Punches)	1	4:51
	Masaomi Saito	def.	Nobuki Fujii	Decision (Unanimous)	2	5:00
	Takuma Ishii	def.	Chikara Shimabukuro	Decision (Unanimous)	2	5:00

== Pancrase: Impressive Tour 9 ==
Pancrase: Impressive Tour 9 was an event held on September 4, 2011, at The Differ Ariake Arena in Tokyo, Japan.

=== Results ===
Main Card
Weight class				Method	Round	Time	Notes
Featherweight	Takumi Nakayama	def.	Tomonari Kanomata	Decision (Unanimous)	3	5:00	(Note: For the Pancrase Featherweight Championship.)
	Shungo Oyama	def.	Gyu Seok Son	KO (Punch)	1	0:11
	Tashiro Nishiuchi	vs.	Masahiro Oishi	Draw (Majority)	3	5:00
	Naoyuki Kotani	def.	Katsuya Inoue	Submission (Armbar)	1	1:44
	Rin Nakai	vs.	Danielle West	Draw (Split)	3	5:00
	Shingo Suzuki	def.	Akihiro Yamazaki	Submission (Heel Hook)	1	4:01
	Naoko Omuro	vs.	Kayo Nagayasu	Draw (Majority)	2	5:00
	Yuki Yasunaga	def.	Toshiteru Ishii	TKO (Punches)	1	4:45
	Keigo Hirayama	def.	Ryosuke Togashi	TKO (Punches)	1	1:20
	Chikara Shimabukuro	def.	Go Yamanaka	Decision (Unanimous)	2	5:00
	Junya Nishikawa	def.	Daryl Lokuku	Decision (Unanimous)	2	3:00
	Akihito Hara	def.	Kensaku Kaneko	Decision (Majority)	1	5:00
	Shiro Wakamatsu	def.	Shun Fukazawa	Decision (Unanimous)	1	5:00
	Kosuke Terashima	def.	Hiroyuki Tamura	Submission (Guillotine Choke)	2	1:33
	Joshua Robison	vs.	Toshikazu Suzuki	Draw	2	5:00
	Taichi Nakajima	def.	Isao Takatsu	TKO (Punches)	1	4:57
	Yusuke Kitago	def.	Kotaro Kazama	TKO (Punches)	1	2:06

== Pancrase: Impressive Tour 10 ==
Pancrase: Impressive Tour 10 was an event held on October 2, 2011, at The Differ Ariake Arena in Tokyo, Japan.

=== Results ===
Main Card
Weight class				Method	Round	Time	Notes
	Takenori Sato	vs.	Eiji Ishikawa	Draw (Split)	3	5:00
	Koji Oishi	vs.	Yoshiaki Takahashi	Draw (Unanimous)	2	5:00
	Sojiro Orui	def.	Kenta Takagi	Decision (Unanimous)	2	5:00
	Yuki Kondo	def.	Yuta Nakamura	Decision (Unanimous)	2	5:00
	Kosei Kubota	vs.	Hiroki Nagaoka	Draw (Majority)	2	5:00
	Masaya Takita	def.	Shoko Sato	Technical Submission (Rear-Naked Choke)	2	3:00
	Jon Shores	def.	Masayoshi Ichikawa	KO (Punches)	1	2:10
	Juntaro Ami	def.	Keiji Sakuta	Submission (Rear-Naked Choke)	2	3:23
	Masaki Yanagisawa	def.	Ryo Saito	Submission (Heel Hook)	1	3:17
	Tatsuya So	def.	Kenichi Tosa	Decision (Unanimous)	2	5:00
	Shigeaki Kusayanagi	def.	Kenji Nagaki	TKO (Punches)	2	4:21
	Junichi Ota	vs.	Shogo Ohashi	Draw (Unanimous)	2	5:00
	Shino VanHoose	def.	Nana Ichikawa	Technical Submission (Ezekiel Choke)	1	0:51
	Kentaro Yorimitsu	def.	Kiriro Mano	TKO (Punches)	2	1:49
	Kei Suzuki	def.	Naohiro Takaoka	Technical Submission (Armbar)	2	2:46
	Sota Kojima	def.	Takamasa Kiuchi	KO (Punch)	1	3:56

== Pancrase: Impressive Tour 11 ==
Pancrase: Impressive Tour 11 was an event held on November 12, 2011, at Shinjuku Face in Tokyo, Japan.

=== Results ===
Main Card
Weight class				Method	Round	Time	Notes
	Tashiro Nishiuchi	vs.	Yuki Kosaka	Draw (Split)	2	5:00
	Masaomi Saito	def.	Takumi Murata	Decision (Majority)	2	5:00
	Kensaku Nakamura	vs.	Shinya Irei	Draw (Split)	2	5:00
	Kyoko Kimura	def.	Megumi Yabushita	TKO (Doctor Stoppage)	1	5:00
	Naoki Tajima	def.	Akihiro Sakurai	TKO (Punches)	2	1:33
	Yuki Uejima	vs.	Chikara Shimabukuro	Draw (Split)	2	5:00
	Kenichi Sawada	def.	Yuya Kaneuchi	KO (Punch)	2	1:20
	Junya Nishikawa	def.	Akihiro Ono	Decision (Unanimous)	2	5:00
	Nobuki Fujii	def.	Yusuke Kitago	Decision (Unanimous)	2	5:00
	Kosuke Terashima	vs.	Takumi Shimazaki	Draw (Unanimous)	2	5:00
	Koichi Sugai	vs.	Kosaku Yanai	Draw (Time Limit)	2	5:00
	Rei Kawahara	vs.	Taichi Nakajima	Draw (Time Limit)	2	5:00

== Pancrase: Impressive Tour 12 ==
Pancrase: Impressive Tour 12 was an event held on November 27, 2011, at Azalea Taisho Hall in Osaka, Osaka, Japan.

=== Results ===
Main Card
Weight class				Method	Round	Time	Notes
	Masahiro Toryu	vs.	Yukinari Tamura	Draw (Majority)	2	5:00
	Motonobu Tezuka	def.	Nobuhiro Yoshitake	Decision (Unanimous)	2	5:00
	Kiichi Kunimoto	def.	Yu Shiori	Submission (Guillotine Choke)	2	0:40
	Hiroshi Tomita	vs.	Yudai Aoyama	Draw (Majority)	2	5:00
	Jun Doi	def.	Takayoshi Ono	Decision (Unanimous)	2	5:00
	Kimitaka Kitagawa	def.	Shoki Doi	Submission (Armbar)	1	2:25
	Takasuke Kume	def.	Daisuke Hanazawa	Submission (Rear-Naked Choke)	3	4:01
	Tatsunori Tanaka	def.	Takatoshi Matsumoto	Submission (Rear-Naked Choke)	1	4:03
	Yoshifumi Dogaki	def.	Koji Nakamura	KO (Punch)	1	3:19
	Fukuko Hamada	vs.	Kayo Nagayasu	Draw (Split)	2	5:00
	Daichi Kitakata	def.	Shohei Takamatsu	Decision (Majority)	2	5:00
	Yuya Ono	vs.	Shingo Makita	Draw (Majority)	2	5:00
	Naohiko Kurumatani	vs.	Shingen Morita	Draw (Time Limit)	2	5:00
	Ken Ishida	vs.	Kenichi Kimura	Draw (Time Limit)	2	5:00

== Pancrase: Impressive Tour 13 ==
Pancrase: Impressive Tour 13 was an event held on December 3, 2011, at Differ Ariake Arena in Tokyo, Japan.

=== Results ===
Main Card
Weight class				Method	Round	Time	Notes
	Isao Kobayashi	def.	Kazuki Tokudome	TKO (Punches)	1	4:14
Bantamweight	Shintaro Ishiwatari	def.	Manabu Inoue (c)	Decision (Majority)	3	5:00	(Note: For the Pancrase Bantamweight Championship.)
Flyweight	Mitsuhisa Sunabe	def.	Hiroyuki Abe	TKO (Punches)	3	4:10	(Note: For the Pancrase Flyweight Championship.)
	Koji Oishi	vs.	Katsuhiko Nagata	Draw (Unanimous)	3	5:00
	Jon Shores	def.	Tomonari Kanomata	Decision (Unanimous)	3	5:00
	Keiichiro Yamamiya	def.	Shingo Suzuki	TKO (Punches)	1	4:24
	Ikkei Nagamura	def.	Yoshihito Kuroki	Decision (Majority)	2	5:00
	Yoshiaki Takahashi	def.	Kazuya Satomoto	TKO (Punches)	1	2:59
	Hiroki Nagaoka	def.	Shigeaki Kusayanagi	Decision (Unanimous)	2	5:00
	Yuki Yasunaga	def.	Hiroyuki Nakajima	Decision (Unanimous)	2	5:00
	Masakazu Takafuji	def.	Masaki Yanagisawa	TKO (Soccer Kick)	1	0:52
	Keigo Hirayama	def.	Shogo Ohashi	Submission (Kimura)	2	2:14
	Yoji Saito	def.	Shiro Wakamatsu	Decision (Unanimous)	2	5:00

== See also ==
- List of Pancrase champions
- List of Pancrase events
