= Cristiano Marcello =

Brazilian mixed martial artist (born 1977)

- Born: December 3, 1977 (age 48); Rio de Janeiro, Brazil
- Height: 5 ft 9 in (1.75 m)
- Weight: 155 lb (70 kg; 11.1 st)
- Division: Lightweight; Welterweight
- Reach: 72.5 in (184 cm)
- Style: Brazilian Jiu-Jitsu, Muay Thai
- Fighting out of: Curitiba, Brazil
- Team: Chute Boxe Academy (1998–2009); Gracie Humaitá; Team Alpha Male (occasionally); CM System (2009–present)
- Trainer: Rickson Gracie; Urijah Faber; Royler Gracie
- Rank: 4th degree black belt in Brazilian Jiu-Jitsu
- Years active: 1998–2014

Mixed martial arts record
- Total: 19
- Wins: 13
- By knockout: 2
- By submission: 9
- By decision: 2
- Losses: 6
- By knockout: 3
- By decision: 3

Other information
- Notable students: Maurício Rua; Wanderlei Silva; Cris Cyborg; Murilo Rua; Kazushi Sakuraba; Daniel Acácio Felipe Silva UFC Elizeu Capoeira UFC Matheus Schefel PFL; Mariusz Linke; Evangelista Cyborg; Assuério Silva; Kevin Souza; Marlon Mathias (EliteXC); Hélio Dipp (Jungle Fight); Jean Silva (PRIDE); Andre Amade; José Landi-Jons (Titan Fighting Championships); Marcos Antonio Santana (Shooto)
- Mixed martial arts record from Sherdog
- Last updated on: May 16, 2013

Cristiano Marcello da Silva (born December 3, 1977) is a retired Brazilian mixed martial artist and former Chute Boxe BJJ head coach who formerly fought for the UFC. Cristiano competed in the Brazilian National Jiu-Jitsu Championship in 1998, 1999 and again in 2001. Marcello was also a competitor on The Ultimate Fighter: Live.

== Mixed martial arts career ==
=== Pride Fighting Championships ===
Cristiano fought for PRIDE Fighting Championships at the PRIDE Bushido 12 in August 2006.

Marcello is widely known for a backstage altercation at PRIDE Shockwave 2005 in which Charles Bennett insulted the Chute Boxe Academy and Wanderlei Silva resulting in a fight between Marcello and Bennett, and Marcello put Bennett to sleep with a triangle choke before the fight was broken up.

In January 2009, Marcello left the Chute Boxe Academy in Curitiba to go full on with his own martial arts academy, CM System, which opened its doors in March 2009. Despite leaving Chute Boxe, Marcello is still considered a BJJ coach, and continues to train Chute Boxe fighters out of his own gym.

=== The Ultimate Fighter ===
In February 2012, it was revealed that Marcello was selected to be a participant on The Ultimate Fighter: Live. In the opening round, Marcello defeated Jared Carlsten by submission to qualify as one of the 16 fighters to live in the TUF house.

Marcello was selected as Team Faber's second pick (fourth overall). In the second fight of the first round, Marcello was selected to fight Justin Lawrence, Team Cruz's first overall pick. He was knocked out by Lawrence at 3:15 of the second round.

=== Ultimate Fighting Championship ===
Marcello fought fellow cast member Sam Sicilia on June 1, 2012 at The Ultimate Fighter 15 Finale. Marcello lost via second round KO due to a flurry of knees and punches.

Cristiano made his return against Reza Madadi on October 13, 2012 at UFC 153. He won the fight via a controversial split decision. The decision was controversial since most major MMA outlets scored the bout for Madadi.

Marcello took on UFC newcomer and World Victory Road veteran Kazuki Tokudome at UFC on Fuel TV 8 on March 2, 2013. He lost the fight via unanimous decision.

Marcello faced Joe Proctor on February 15, 2014 at UFC Fight Night 36. He lost the fight via unanimous decision and announced his retirement 2 months later to focus more on his gym and coaching, Marcello also plans to compete in the ADCC for the first time in his grappling career.

=== Return from retirement ===
On June 29, 2018 Marcello announced that he has returned to MMA and has signed a three-fight contract with Brave CF.

== Championships and accomplishments ==
- Nitrix Champion Fight
  - Nitrix Lightweight Championship (One time)

== Mixed martial arts record ==
Professional record breakdown
| 19 matches | 13 wins | 6 losses |
| By knockout | 2 | 3 |
| By submission | 9 | 0 |
| By decision | 2 | 3 |

| Res. | Record | Opponent | Method | Event | Date | Round | Time | Location | Notes |
|---|---|---|---|---|---|---|---|---|---|
| Loss | 13–6 | Joe Proctor | Decision (unanimous) | UFC Fight Night: Machida vs. Mousasi | February 15, 2014 | 3 | 5:00 | Jaraguá do Sul, Brazil | |
| Loss | 13–5 | Kazuki Tokudome | Decision (unanimous) | UFC on Fuel TV: Silva vs. Stann | March 3, 2013 | 3 | 5:00 | Saitama, Japan | |
| Win | 13–4 | Reza Madadi | Decision (split) | UFC 153 | October 13, 2012 | 3 | 5:00 | Rio de Janeiro, Brazil | |
| Loss | 12–4 | Sam Sicilia | KO (knees and punches) | The Ultimate Fighter 15 Finale | June 1, 2012 | 2 | 2:53 | Las Vegas, Nevada, United States | |
| Win | 12–3 | Oriol Gaset | Decision (majority) | Nitrix Champion Fight 6 | February 19, 2011 | 5 | 5:00 | Brusque, Santa Catarina, Brazil | Won the Nitrix Lightweight Championship. |
| Win | 11–3 | Freddy Thole | Submission (triangle choke) | Desert Force Championship 1 | December 8, 2010 | 1 | 4:01 | Amman, Jordan | |
| Win | 10–3 | Guido Cannetti | Submission (rear-naked choke) | Bitetti Combat 8: 100 Years of Corinthians | December 4, 2010 | 1 | 1:52 | São Paulo, Brazil | |
| Loss | 9–3 | Alejandro Solano Rodriguez | TKO (punches) | Bitetti Combat 7 | May 28, 2010 | 2 | 2:58 | Rio de Janeiro, Brazil | |
| Win | 9–2 | Emiliano Vatti | Submission (armbar) | Bitetti Combat 6 | February 25, 2010 | 1 | 1:05 | Brasília, Brazil | |
| Win | 8–2 | Hector Munoz | Submission (rear-naked choke) | Art of War 3 | September 1, 2007 | 1 | 4:58 | Dallas, Texas, United States | |
| Win | 7–2 | Dave Kaplan | Submission (triangle choke) | Fury FC 2: Final Combat | November 30, 2006 | 2 | 2:37 | São Paulo, Brazil | |
| Loss | 6–2 | Mitsuhiro Ishida | Decision (unanimous) | Pride - Bushido 12 | August 26, 2006 | 2 | 5:00 | Aichi Prefecture, Japan | |
| Win | 6–1 | Do Hyung Kim | TKO (doctor stoppage) | MARS World Grand Prix | April 29, 2006 | 1 | 1:20 | Seoul, South Korea | Fought at Welterweight. |
| Win | 5–1 | Jaydson Costa | Submission (triangle choke) | Meca World Vale Tudo 7 | November 8, 2002 | 1 | 3:23 | Curitiba, Brazil | |
| Loss | 4–1 | Luiz Azeredo | TKO (knees) | Meca World Vale Tudo 6 | January 31, 2002 | 1 | 8:30 | Curitiba, Brazil | |
| Win | 4–0 | Fernando Almeida | Submission (rear-naked choke) | Brazilian Freestyle Circuit 2 | August 8, 1998 | 2 | 5:00 | Amazonas, Brazil | |
| Win | 3–0 | Ricardo Corumba | Submission (armbar) | Brazilian Freestyle Circuit 2 | August 8, 1998 | 1 | 4:05 | Amazonas, Brazil | |
| Win | 2–0 | Ray Peres | KO (stomps and punches) | Brazilian Freestyle Circuit 1 | April 25, 1998 | 3 | 3:50 | Amazonas, Brazil | |
| Win | 1–0 | Claudio de Souza | Submission (triangle choke) | Brazilian Freestyle Circuit 1 | April 25, 1998 | 1 | 4:37 | Amazonas, Brazil | |

=== Mixed martial arts exhibition record ===
| Exhibition record breakdown | | |
| 2 matches | 1 win | 1 loss |
| By knockout | 0 | 1 |
| By submission | 1 | 0 |

| Res. | Record | Opponent | Method | Event | Date | Round | Time | Location | Notes |
|---|---|---|---|---|---|---|---|---|---|
| Loss | 1–1 | Justin Lawrence | KO (punch) | The Ultimate Fighter: Live | March 23, 2012 | 2 | 3:15 | Las Vegas, Nevada, United States | |
| Win | 1–0 | Jared Carlsten | Submission (rear-naked choke) | The Ultimate Fighter: Live | March 9, 2012 | 1 | 2:43 | Las Vegas, Nevada, United States | 1 round TUF entry fight. |
