= Tomonari Kanomata =

Japanese mixed martial artist

Tomonari Kanomata 鹿又智成
- Born: August 4, 1979 (age 47); Akishima, Tokyo, Japan
- Nationality: Japanese
- Height: 5 ft 8 in (1.73 m)
- Weight: 145 lb (66 kg; 10.4 st)
- Division: Featherweight; Lightweight
- Style: Brazilian jiu-jitsu
- Team: Paraestra Hachioji
- Rank: Black Belt in Brazilian Jiu-Jitsu
- Years active: 2002 - 2014

Mixed martial arts record
- Total: 36
- Wins: 20
- By knockout: 4
- By submission: 6
- By decision: 10
- Losses: 9
- By knockout: 5
- By decision: 4
- Draws: 7

Other information
- Mixed martial arts record from Sherdog

Tomonari Kanomata Japanese: 鹿又智成 (born August 4, 1979) is a Japanese mixed martial artist. He competed in the featherweight and lightweight divisions.

== Mixed martial arts record ==
Professional record breakdown
36 matches	20 wins	9 losses
By knockout	4	5
By submission	6	0
By decision	10	4
Draws	7	

Res.	Record	Opponent	Method	Event	Date	Round	Time	Location	Notes
Loss	20–9–7	Guy Delumeau	Decision (Unanimous)	Pancrase: 260	August 10, 2014	3	5:00	Tokyo, Japan	
Draw	20–8–7	Junpei Chikano	Draw (Majority)	Pancrase: 257	March 30, 2014	2	5:00	Yokohama, Kanagawa, Japan	
Win	20–8–6	Kazushi Sugiyama	Decision (Unanimous)	Pancrase: 255	December 8, 2013	2	5:00	Tokyo, Japan	
Loss	19–8–6	Daniel Swain	TKO (Punches)	Pancrase: 248	June 30, 2013	2	4:36	Tokyo, Japan	
Loss	19–7–6	Jon Shores	Decision (Unanimous)	Pancrase: Impressive Tour 13	December 3, 2011	3	5:00	Tokyo, Japan	
Loss	19–6–6	Takumi Nakayama	Decision (Unanimous)	Pancrase: Impressive Tour 9	September 4, 2011	3	5:00	Tokyo, Japan	For the interim Pancrase Featherweight Championship.
Win	19–5–6	Masakazu Takafuji	Submission (Kimura)	Pancrase: Impressive Tour 4	May 3, 2011	1	4:08	Tokyo, Japan	
Win	18–5–6	Motoshi Miyaji	Decision (Unanimous)	Pancrase: Impressive Tour 1	February 6, 2011	2	5:00	Tokyo, Japan	
Win	17–5–6	Kenji Arai	Technical Submission (Rear-Naked Choke)	Pancrase: Passion Tour 11	December 5, 2010	1	0:24	Tokyo, Japan	
Draw	16–5–6	Shigeki Osawa	Draw (Unanimous)	Pancrase: Passion Tour 10	November 3, 2010	3	5:00	Tokyo, Japan	
Win	16–5–5	Takayoshi Ono	TKO (Punches)	Pancrase: Passion Tour 7	August 8, 2010	2	3:40	Tokyo, Japan	
Loss	15–5–5	Marlon Sandro	KO (Punch)	World Victory Road Presents: Sengoku Raiden Championships 12	March 7, 2010	1	0:09	Tokyo, Japan	
Win	15–4–5	Shigeyuki Uchiyama	Decision (Majority)	Pancrase: Passion Tour 1	February 7, 2010	2	5:00	Tokyo, Japan	
Win	14–4–5	Kenji Arai	Decision (Unanimous)	Pancrase: Changing Tour 8	December 6, 2009	3	5:00	Tokyo, Japan	
Draw	13–4–5	Kenji Arai	Draw (Majority)	Pancrase: Changing Tour 6	October 25, 2009	2	5:00	Tokyo, Japan	
Draw	13–4–4	Tashiro Nishiuchi	Draw	Pancrase: Changing Tour 4	August 8, 2009	2	5:00	Tokyo, Japan	
Loss	13–4–3	Yoshihiro Koyama	Decision (Unanimous)	GCM: Cage Force EX	February 28, 2009	3	5:00	Tokorozawa, Saitama, Japan	
Win	13–3–3	Eriya Matsuda	Submission (Armbar)	GCM: Cage Force 9	December 6, 2008	1	0:30	Tokyo, Japan	
Win	12–3–3	Djamal Kurbanov	Decision (Unanimous)	FEFoMP: Mayor Cup 2008	October 25, 2008	3	5:00	Vladivostok, Primorsky Krai, Russia	
Loss	11–3–3	Mizuto Hirota	TKO (Punches)	GCM: Cage Force 6	April 5, 2008	1	1:00	Tokyo, Japan	
Loss	11–2–3	Artur Oumakhanov	TKO (Cut)	GCM: Cage Force EX Eastern Bound	November 11, 2007	2	2:54		
Win	11–1–3	Wataru Takahashi	Decision (Unanimous)	GCM: Cage Force 3	June 9, 2007	3	5:00	Tokyo, Japan	
Win	10–1–3	Jacob Sidic	TKO (Punches)	GCM: Cage Force 2	March 17, 2007	1	0:09	Tokyo, Japan	
Win	9–1–3	Jarkko Latomaki	Submission (Triangle Choke)	CWFC: Showdown 2	November 19, 2006	1	1:13	Sheffield, Yorkshire and the Humber, England	
Win	8–1–3	Peter Irving	TKO (Punches)	CWFC: Showdown 2	November 19, 2006	2	3:36	Sheffield, Yorkshire and the Humber, England	
Win	7–1–3	Bryan Cohen	TKO (Punches)	CWFC: Showdown 2	November 19, 2006	1	0:57	Sheffield, Yorkshire and the Humber, England	
Win	6–1–3	Yasunori Kanehara	Decision (Majority)	GCM: D.O.G. 7	September 9, 2006	2	5:00	Tokyo, Japan	
Win	5–1–3	Yoichi Fukumoto	Decision (Majority)	GCM: D.O.G. 6	June 11, 2006	3	5:00	Tokyo, Japan	
Win	4–1–3	Wataru Miki	Decision (Unanimous)	Shooto: 9/23 in Korakuen Hall	September 23, 2005	2	5:00	Tokyo, Japan	
Draw	3–1–3	Kabuto Kokage	Draw	Shooto: Rookie Tournament 2004 Final	November 25, 2004	2	5:00	Setagaya, Tokyo, Japan	
Draw	3–1–2	Ganjo Tentsuku	Draw	Shooto 2004: 7/4 in Kitazawa Town Hall	July 4, 2004	2	5:00	Setagaya, Tokyo, Japan	
Win	3–1–1	Takayuki Okochi	Decision (Unanimous)	Shooto 2004: 5/3 in Korakuen Hall	May 3, 2004	2	5:00	Tokyo, Japan	
Loss	2–1–1	Nobuhiro Obiya	TKO (Punches)	Shooto: Who is Young Leader!	October 31, 2003	1	0:11	Tokyo, Japan	
Win	2–0–1	Masaya Takita	Submission (Armbar)	Shooto: 5/4 in Korakuen Hall	May 4, 2003	1	4:49	Tokyo, Japan	
Win	1–0–1	Yoshinori Amari	Submission (Armbar)	Shooto: 1/24 in Korakuen Hall	January 24, 2003	1	4:16	Tokyo, Japan	
Draw	0–0–1	Nobuhiro Obiya	Draw	Shooto: Treasure Hunt 11	November 15, 2002	2	5:00	Tokyo, Japan	

== See also ==
- List of male mixed martial artists
