= Mariusz Linke =

Polish mixed martial arts fighter (1969–2022)

- Born: 31 July 1969; Zielona Góra, Poland
- Died: 30 May 2022 (aged 52); Szczecin, Poland
- Other names: Manolo
- Height: 5 ft 11 in (1.80 m)
- Weight: 210 lb (95 kg; 15 st)
- Division: Lightweight; Welterweight; Middleweight
- Reach: 72.5 in (184 cm)
- Style: Brazilian Jiu-Jitsu
- Stance: Southpaw
- Fighting out of: Szczecin, Poland
- Team: Linke Gold Team (2005–2022); Gracie Barra Łódź (2006–2022); Chute Boxe Academy (2001–2003, 2005); Beserkers Team (1999–2004); Macaco Gold Team; Singpatong Impacts (2014)
- Trainer: Jorge Patino; Cristiano Marcello; Marcin Rogowski; Singpatong Sitnumnoi
- Rank: 4th dan black belt in Judo; 4th degree black belt in Brazilian Jiu-Jitsu
- Years active: 1999–2022

Mixed martial arts record
- Total: 16
- Wins: 11
- By knockout: 1
- By submission: 10
- Losses: 5
- By knockout: 3
- By submission: 2
- By decision: 0

Other information
- University: Academia Wychowania Fitzycznego i Sportu (class of 2004)
- Spouse: Iwona Linke (m. 2000)
- Children: 2
- Notable students: Maciej Jewtuszko, Przemysław Saleta, Tomasz Narkun, Felipe Arantes, Francisco Treviño
- Mixed martial arts record from Sherdog

Mariusz Linke
Medal record

Representing Poland

Men's Black Belt Jiu-Jitsu

European Championship
| Bronze medal – third place | 2007 Lisbon, Portugal | -76 kg |
| Gold medal – first place | 2012 Lisbon, Portugal | -76 kg |
| Silver medal – second place | 2012 Lisbon, Portugal | Absolute |
| Gold medal – first place | 2014 Lisbon, Portugal | 94 kg |
| Gold medal – first place | 2015 Lisbon, Portugal | 94 kg |
| Bronze medal – third place | 2016 Lisbon, Portugal | 100+ kg |
| Bronze medal – third place | 2018 Lisbon, Portugal | Absolute |

North American Grappling Association
| Silver medal – second place | 2012 Atlantic City, New Jersey | -77 kg |
| Gold medal – first place | 2012 Atlantic City, New Jersey | Absolute |

Pan American No-Gi Championship
| Bronze medal – third place | 2013 Rome, Italy | 84 kg |
| Gold medal – first place | 2015 Rome, Italy | 94 kg |

Mariusz Ryszard Linke (31 July 1969 – 30 May 2022) was a Polish professional mixed martial artist and grappler.

== Career ==
He was most notable for being the first Polish born black belt in Brazilian jiu-jitsu, the highest ranking active Polish judoka and BJJ practitioner in both mixed martial arts and grappling, and one of the most decorated grapplers in Poland. He was also the first Polish grappler to travel to Brazil and receive training under a Gracie trained Brazilian jiu-jitsu black belt. Linke notably competed in the European Championship, NAGA, Grapplers Quest, ADCC, and the Pan American Games. Linke was in talks with top Polish promotion Konfrontacja Sztuk Walki to negotiate a two-fight contract to close out his mixed martial arts career by the end of 2015, Linke stated despite retiring from fighting he would still continue his grappling career.

== Death ==
On May 30, 2022 Linke died after contracting a staphylococcal infection earlier in the year, the bacterial infection later spread into his bloodstream and attached to his heart valves causing Linke to develop infective endocarditis.

== Grappling titles and accomplishments ==
- 2017 Grapplers Quest Heavyweight Champion (Masters Gi)
- 2016 European Championship - Bronze Medalist
- 2015 Pan American No-Gi Championship - Gold Medalist
- 2015 European Championship - Gold Medalist
- 2014 European Championship - Gold Medalist
- 2013 Pan American No-Gi Championship - Bronze Medalist
- 2012 European Championship - Gold and Silver Medalist
- 2012 NAGA Champion - Gold and Silver Medalist
- 2011 London Open Champion
- 2011 Pan American No-Gi Championship Competitor
- 2010 Eastern European Champion (Judo)
- 2008 NAGA Tournament Competitor
- 2007 European Championship - Bronze Medalist
- 2006 ADCC Polish Trials Champion
- 2005 Pan American Games Competitor
- 2004 Polish Open Champion (Judo)
- 2003 Pan American Games Competitor
- 2000 Eastern European Champion (Judo)
- 2000 European Judo Championships Competitor
- 1999 Polish National Champion (Judo)
- 1999 Bad Boy Cup Champion
- 3 time Grapplers Quest Competitor (2008, 2011, 2012)

== Other information ==
Mariusz received his Brazilian jiu-jitsu black belt under former Strikeforce fighter, coach and fight promoter Jorge Patino, Linke also had two training stints with current UFC fighter Cristiano Marcello during his stay in Brazil between 2001 and 2003 and again in 2005. Linke's nickname "Manolo" was taken from the movie Scarface, his personal friends said that Linke was really laid back and looked and acted like the character Manolo Ribera, played by Steven Bauer.

Linke was part of the BJJ lineage that began with the creator Mitsuyo Maeda and was later passed on to one of the founding instructors of Jiu-Jitsu in Brazil, Carlos Gracie.

Linke was one of very few BJJ practitioners to start at white belt and skip blue to purple, his instructors Jorge Patino and Cristiano Marcello mutually decided to skip Linke from white to purple in late 2002 due to his extensive Judo background, this skip in rank is a very rare occurrence and was the first person under Jorge Patino and first BJJ practitioner to join Chute Boxe Academy to do so.

Linke was also known for his outlandish appearance, covered in numerous tattoos and coloring his nails and hair to distract other fighters.

Maruisz produced the most black belts in Brazilian jiu-jitsu in Poland, as of 2017 he promoted 43 black belts in BJJ, 77 brown belts and over 200 purple belts.

After winning his gold medal at the Pan Jiu-Jitsu No-Gi Championship in 2015 Linke became the unofficial record breaking holder for most medals won in professional grappling and contact sports as a Polish competitor.

== Mixed martial arts record ==
Professional record breakdown
| 16 matches | 11 wins | 5 losses |
| By knockout | 1 | 3 |
| By submission | 10 | 2 |
| By decision | 0 | 0 |
| Draws | 0 | |
| No contests | 0 | |

| Res. | Record | Opponent | Method | Event | Date | Round | Time | Location | Notes |
|---|---|---|---|---|---|---|---|---|---|
| Win | 11-5 | (Poland) Dawid Potoczny | Submission (keylock) | Imperium Arena: Fijaka vs. Ostrowski | 8 December 2013 | 1 | 2:22 | Szczecin, Poland | Middleweight debut |
| Loss | 10-5 | (Poland) Marcin Grzeskowiak | TKO (shoulder injury) | IFC: Winner's Punch | 19 November 2010 | 1 | 1:40 | Bydgoszcz, Poland | |
| Loss | 10-4 | (Brazil) Gregor Gracie | Submission (rear naked choke) | BCFC: Gracie vs Linke | 2 October 2010 | 1 | 2:13 | Newark, New Jersey, United States | Return to Welterweight |
| Win | 10-3 | (Poland) Lukasz Baran | TKO (punches) | IFC - Tsunami Tournament 1 | 19 March 2010 | 1 | 1:25 | Debrzno, Poland | Fought at Lightweight |
| Win | 9-3 | (Poland) Lukasz Baran | Submission (standing arm-triangle choke) | Bushido 6 | 8 January 2010 | 1 | 0:20 | Szczecin, Poland | Fought at Lightweight |
| Loss | 8-3 | (Poland) Piotr Sulecki | TKO (corner stoppage) | Iron Fist | 26 September 2009 | 1 | 1:30 | Szczecin, Poland | Catchweight bout (166 lbs) |
| Win | 8-2 | (Poland) Tomasz Macior | Submission (arm-triangle choke) | Warriors Extreme Fighting | 27 June 2008 | 1 | 2:09 | Pila, Poland | Lightweight debut |
| Win | 7-2 | (Poland) Lukasz Ptaszynski | Submission (arm-triangle choke) | Bushido 5 | 14 December 2007 | 1 | 3:32 | Szczecin, Poland | |
| Win | 6-2 | (Poland) Slawomir Zakrzewski | Submission (arm-triangle choke) | Bushido 3 | 25 February 2006 | 1 | 1:43 | Szczecin, Poland | |
| Win | 5-2 | (Poland) Donat Ignatowicz | Submission (kimura) | Bushido 2 | 26 February 2005 | 1 | 1:18 | Szczecin, Poland | |
| Win | 4-2 | (Poland) Donat Ignatowicz | Submission (rear naked choke) | Bushido 1 | 7 March 2004 | 1 | 2:34 | Szczecin, Poland | |
| Loss | 3-2 | (Poland) Andrzej Kulik | KO (stomp and punches) | Berserkers Arena 2 | 11 January 2004 | 1 | 0:15 | Szczecin, Poland | |
| Loss | 3-1 | (Brazil) Rodrigo Durok Asmus | Submission (guillotine choke) | Brazil Super Fight | 19 September 2003 | 1 | 4:35 | Alegre, Brazil | |
| Win | 3-0 | (Poland) Damian Grabowski | Submission (rear naked choke) | Berserkers Arena 1 | 6 June 2003 | 1 | 1:36 | Szczecin, Poland | |
| Win | 2-0 | (Poland) Dariusz Bres | Submission (keylock) | Polish All-Style Karate Organization - Japanese Gala | 1 May 2003 | 1 | 1:23 | Siemiatycze, Poland | |
| Win | 1-0 | (Poland) Slawomir Zakrzewski | Submission (triangle choke) | 13 International Boxing Tournament - Pomeranian Griffin Cup | 14 December 2001 | 1 | 24:00 | Szczecin, Poland | |
