= Kiichi Kunimoto =

Zainichi Korean MMA fighter (born 1981)

Kiichi Kunimoto ストラッサー起一
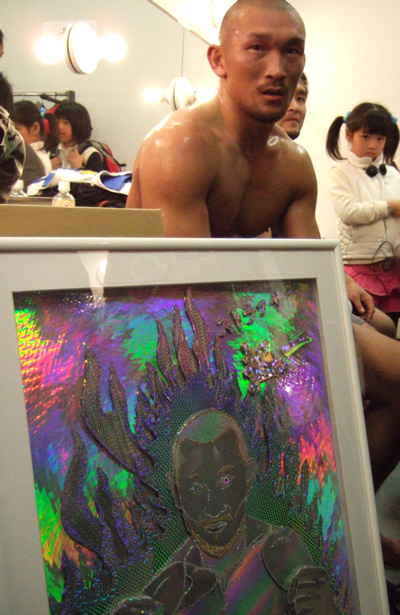
- Kiichi Kunimoto, with a holographic collage of him by the artist Takayuki Hibino
- Born: May 1, 1981 (age 45); Osaka, Japan
- Other names: Strasser
- Nationality: Japanese
- Height: 5 ft 10 in (1.78 m)
- Weight: 77 kg (170 lb; 12.1 st)
- Division: Welterweight
- Reach: 73 in (190 cm)
- Team: Cobra Kai MMA Dojo
- Trainer: Dave Strasser
- Rank: Brown belt in Brazilian Jiu-Jitsu
- Years active: 2006–present

Mixed martial arts record
- Total: 36
- Wins: 21
- By knockout: 2
- By submission: 10
- By decision: 8
- By disqualification: 1
- Losses: 12
- By knockout: 3
- By submission: 3
- By decision: 6
- Draws: 2
- No contests: 1

Other information
- Mixed martial arts record from Sherdog

Kiichi Kunimoto (Japanese: 国本 起一, Kunimoto Kiichi; born May 1, 1981) is a Japanese professional mixed martial artist currently competing in the welterweight division. A professional competitor since 2006, he has also competed for the RIZIN, UFC, Bellator, and Pancrase.

== Background ==
Born and raised in the Nishinari-ku district Osaka, Japan, Kunimoto was a professional skateboarder from the age of 17 until he was 24, when he began training in mixed martial arts.

== Mixed martial art career ==
=== Early career ===
Kunimoto made his professional debut in 2006 for Pancrase, losing via knockout. However, Kunimoto would go on to compile a record of 14-5-2 with one no contest and captured the HEAT Welterweight Championship, subsequently defending his title twice, before being signed by the UFC.

=== Ultimate Fighting Championship ===
Kunimoto was originally scheduled to make his UFC debut at UFC Fight Night 34 on June 4, 2014, against Hyun Gyu Lim, but instead faced Luiz Dutra Jr. as Lim was promoted to appear in the main event. Kunimoto won via disqualification due to Dutra Jr. landing multiple elbows to the back of Kunimoto's head in the first round.

Kunimoto made his next appearance at UFC 174 on June 14, 2014, facing Daniel Sarafian. Kunimoto won via rear-naked choke submission in the first round, and earned "Performance of the Night" honors for his performance.

Kunimoto then faced Richard Walsh on September 20, 2014, at UFC Fight Night 52. He won the fight via split decision.

Kunimoto faced Neil Magny on February 14, 2015, at UFC Fight Night 60. He lost the fight via rear=naked choke submission in the third round.

Kunimoto was expected to face Li Jingliang on September 27, 2015, at UFC Fight Night 75. However, Kunimoto pulled out of the fight in late August citing injury and was replaced by returning veteran Keita Nakamura.

After an extended hiatus, Kunimoto was expected to face Warlley Alves on June 11, 2017, at UFC Fight Night 110. However, Alves pulled out of the fight on May 19 and was replaced by Zak Ottow. He lost the fight via split decision.

=== RIZIN Fighting Federation ===
Kunimoto made the move and signed with Rizin Fighting Federation. He made his against Satoru Kitaoka on December 29, 2017, at RIZIN World Grand Prix 2017: 2nd Round in a 75 kg catchweight bout. Kunimoto won the fight by unanimous decision.

=== Bellator MMA ===
In April 2019, news surfaced that Kunimoto had signed a contract with Bellator MMA. In his promotional debut, Kunimoto faced Ed Ruth at Bellator 224 on July 12, 2019 and lost the fight via TKO in the second round.

As the sophomore bout of his Bellator tenure, Kunimoto was expected to face Neiman Gracie at Bellator 236 on December 21, 2019. However, Gracie had to withdraw from the bout due to an injury and was replaced by Jason Jackson. He lost the fight via unanimous decision.

=== Rizin FF ===
Kunimoto returned to Rizin in order to face Takahiro Kawanaka on November 28, 2021 at Rizin Trigger 1. He won the bout via first-round submission.

Kunimoto then faced Daichi Abe at Rizin 34 – Osaka on March 20, 2022. He lost the fight via unanimous decision.

On April 1, 2023 at Rizin 41 – Osaka, Kunimoto lost to Keita Nakamura via second round TKO stoppage after being dropped with a right straight and getting finished with a soccer kick.

== Personal life ==
Kunimoto and his fiancée have a daughter (born 2019).

== Championships and accomplishments ==
=== Mixed martial arts ===
- Heat
  - HEAT Welterweight Championship (One time; former)
    - Two successful title defenses
- Ultimate Fighting Championship
  - Performance of the Night (One time) vs. Daniel Sarafian

== Mixed martial arts record ==
Professional record breakdown
36 matches	21 wins	12 losses
By knockout	2	3
By submission	10	3
By decision	8	6
By disqualification	1	0
Draws	2	
No contests	1	

Res.	Record	Opponent	Method	Event	Date	Round	Time	Location	Notes
Loss	21–12–2 (1)	Ibuki Shimada	Submission (rear-naked choke)	DEEP 130 Impact	March 20, 2026	1	3:44	Tokyo, Japan	For the DEEP Welterweight Championship.
Win	21–11–2 (1)	Yoichiro Sato	Decision (unanimous)	DEEP 127 Impact	September 15, 2025	3	5:00	Tokyo, Japan	
Loss	20–11–2 (1)	Diego Nunes	KO (punches)	Fire Cage FC 1	February 22, 2025	1	1:15	Nilai, Malaysia	For the inaugural Fire Cage FC Welterweight Championship.
Loss	20–10–2 (1)	Keita Nakamura	KO (punches and soccer kick)	Rizin 41	April 1, 2023	2	0:49	Osaka, Japan	
Loss	20–9–2 (1)	Daichi Abe	Decision (unanimous)	Rizin 34	March 20, 2022	3	3:00	Osaka, Japan	
Win	20–8–2 (1)	Takahiro Kawanaka	Submission (arm-triangle choke)	Rizin Trigger 1	November 28, 2021	1	4:10	Kobe, Japan	
Loss	19–8–2 (1)	Jason Jackson	Decision (unanimous)	Bellator 236	December 21, 2019	3	5:00	Honolulu, Hawaii, United States	
Loss	19–7–2 (1)	Ed Ruth	TKO (knee and punches)	Bellator 224	July 12, 2019	2	3:49	Thackerville, Oklahoma, United States	
Win	19–6–2 (1)	Ryuichiro Sumimura	Technical Submission (arm-triangle choke)	Rizin 12	August 12, 2018	1	4:59	Nagoya, Japan	
Win	18–6–2 (1)	Satoru Kitaoka	Decision (unanimous)	Rizin World Grand Prix 2017: 2nd Round	December 29, 2017	2	5:00	Saitama, Japan	Catchweight (75 kg) bout.
Loss	17–6–2 (1)	Zak Ottow	Decision (split)	UFC Fight Night: Lewis vs. Hunt	June 11, 2017	3	5:00	Auckland, New Zealand	
Loss	17–5–2 (1)	Neil Magny	Submission (rear-naked choke)	UFC Fight Night: Henderson vs. Thatch	February 14, 2015	3	1:22	Broomfield, Colorado, United States	
Win	17–4–2 (1)	Richard Walsh	Decision (split)	UFC Fight Night: Hunt vs. Nelson	September 20, 2014	3	5:00	Saitama, Japan	
Win	16–4–2 (1)	Daniel Sarafian	Submission (rear-naked choke)	UFC 174	June 14, 2014	1	2:52	Vancouver, British Columbia, Canada	Performance of the Night.
Win	15–4–2 (1)	Luiz Dutra Jr.	DQ (elbows to back of the head)	UFC Fight Night: Saffiedine vs. Lim	January 4, 2014	1	2:57	Marina Bay, Singapore	
Win	14–4–2 (1)	Edward Faaloloto	Submission (armbar)	Heat 27	July 28, 2013	1	1:55	Hyogo, Japan	Defended the HEAT Welterweight Championship.
Win	13–4–2 (1)	Fumitoshi Ishikawa	Submission (arm-triangle choke)	Heat 26	March 31, 2013	5	1:59	Aichi, Japan	Defended the HEAT Welterweight Championship.
Win	12–4–2 (1)	Lee Gyu-myung	Submission (shoulder choke)	Heat 25	November 18, 2012	1	4:40	Tokyo, Japan	Won the HEAT Welterweight Championship.
Win	11–4–2 (1)	Son Seong-won	Decision (unanimous)	Heat: Heat 23	June 23, 2012	3	5:00	Hyogo, Japan	
Loss	10–4–2 (1)	Takenori Sato	Decision (unanimous)	Pancrase: Progress Tour 3	March 11, 2012	3	5:00	Tokyo, Japan	For the Pancrase Welterweight Championship.
Win	10–3–2 (1)	Yu Shiroi	Submission (guillotine choke)	Pancrase: Impressive Tour 12	November 27, 2011	2	0:40	Osaka, Japan	
Win	9–3–2 (1)	Kengo Ura	Decision (unanimous)	Pancrase: Impressive Tour 4	May 3, 2011	3	5:00	Tokyo, Japan	
Draw	8–3–2 (1)	Seiki Ryo	Draw (unanimous)	Pancrase: Passion Tour 7	August 8, 2010	2	5:00	Tokyo, Japan	
Draw	8–3–1 (1)	Tomoyoshi Iwamiya	Draw (unanimous)	Pancrase: Passion Tour 2	March 22, 2010	3	5:00	Osaka, Japan	
Win	8–3 (1)	Yoshifumi Dogaki	TKO (punches)	Pancrase: Changing Tour 7	November 8, 2009	2	0:39	Osaka, Japan	
Win	7–3 (1)	Hiroki Tanaka	Decision (unanimous)	Powergate: Octave	April 19, 2009	2	5:00	Osaka, Japan	
Win	6–3 (1)	Shingo Suzuki	Technical Submission (arm-triangle choke)	Pancrase: Changing Tour 1	February 1, 2009	1	3:00	Tokyo, Japan	
Loss	5–3 (1)	Tomoyoshi Iwamiya	Decision (unanimous)	Pancrase: Shining 9	October 26, 2008	2	5:00	Tokyo, Japan	
NC	5–2 (1)	Hirotaka Yoshioka	NC (Yoshioka cut by accident headbutt)	Pancrase: Shining 7	September 7, 2008	1	2:10	Osaka, Japan	An accidental headbutt rendered Yoshioka unable to continue.
Win	5–2	Yu Shiori	Decision (unanimous)	Pancrase: Shining 4	May 25, 2008	2	5:00	Osaka, Japan	
Loss	4–2	Sotaro Yamada	Submission (rear-naked choke)	Pancrase: Shining 1	January 30, 2008	1	1:42	Tokyo, Japan	
Win	4–1	Yuta Nakamura	TKO (punches)	Pancrase: Rising 7	September 30, 2007	1	2:37	Osaka, Japan	
Win	3–1	Mike O'Malley	Submission (triangle choke)	Freestyle Combat Challenge 30	September 1, 2007	1	2:33	Kenosha, Wisconsin, United States	
Win	2–1	Tim Ager	Submission (armbar)	Freestyle Combat Challenge 29	August 11, 2007	1	N/A	Kenosha, Wisconsin, United States	
Loss	1–1	Masahiro Toryu	Decision (majority)	Pancrase: Rising 1	February 4, 2007	2	5:00	Osaka, Japan	
Win	1–0	Arito Kishimoto	Decision (majority)	Double R: 3rd Stage	April 29, 2006	1	5:00	Osaka, Japan	

=== Amateur mixed martial arts record ===
Amateur record breakdown		
2 matches	1 win	1 loss
By knockout	0	1
By submission	1	0

Res.	Record	Opponent	Method	Event	Date	Round	Time	Location	Notes
Win	1–1	Teruyoshi Aoyama	Submission (arm-triangle choke)	Pancrase: Blow 8	October 1, 2006	2	2:58	Osaka, Japan	
Loss	0–1	Masahiro Toryu	KO (head kick)	Pancrase: Blow 2	March 19, 2006	1	0:05	Osaka, Japan	

== See also ==
- List of male mixed martial artists
