= Kazuki Tokudome =

Japanese martial artist (born 1987)

- Born: Kazuki Tokudome; March 4, 1987 (age 39); Tokyo, Japan
- Nationality: Japanese
- Height: 5 ft 11 in (1.80 m)
- Weight: 155 lb (70 kg; 11.1 st)
- Division: Lightweight
- Reach: 73.0 in (185 cm)
- Style: Boxing, Judo, Brazilian Jiu Jitsu
- Stance: Southpaw
- Fighting out of: Tokyo, Japan
- Team: Paraestra Hachioji; Haleo Top Team
- Rank: Black belt in Judo; Purple belt in Brazilian jiu-jitsu
- Years active: 2007–present

Mixed martial arts record
- Total: 33
- Wins: 20
- By knockout: 10
- By submission: 3
- By decision: 7
- Losses: 12
- By knockout: 6
- By submission: 3
- By decision: 3
- Draws: 1

Other information
- Mixed martial arts record from Sherdog

Kazuki Tokudome (徳留一樹, Tokudome Kazuki; born March 4, 1987) is a Japanese professional mixed martial artist currently competing in the Lightweight division of ONE Championship. A professional competitor since 2007, he has also competed in Pancrase, Sengoku Raiden Championships and the Ultimate Fighting Championship.

== Mixed martial arts career ==
=== Early career ===
Tokudome made his professional MMA debut in November 2007 in his native Japan. Before signing with the UFC, he amassed a record of 11–3 with one draw over the course of the first five years of his career.

=== Ultimate Fighting Championship ===
Tokudome made his UFC debut against Cristiano Marcello on March 3, 2013, at UFC on Fuel TV 8. He won the fight via unanimous decision.

In his second fight with the promotion, Tokudome faced Norman Parke on July 6, 2013, at UFC 162. He lost the fight via unanimous decision.

Tokudome faced debuting Yui Chul Nam at The Ultimate Fighter: China Finale on March 1, 2014. He lost the back-and-forth fight via split decision. Despite the loss on the scorecards, he was rewarded with his first Fight of the Night bonus award.

Tokudome faced promotional newcomer Johnny Case on September 20, 2014, at UFC Fight Night 52. He lost the fight via technical submission in the second round and was subsequently released from the promotion.

=== Pancrase ===
Following his release from the UFC, Tokudome competed for Pancrase from 2015 to 2017.

On November 1, 2015, he defeated Satoru Kitaoka by fourth-round technical knockout to win the King of Pancrase Lightweight Championship.

He challenged Takasuke Kume for the King of Pancrase Lightweight Championship at Pancrase 292 on December 10, 2017. He lost the fight via first-round knockout.

=== ONE Championship ===
Tokudome then signed with ONE Championship and made his promotional debut against Jadamba Narantungalag at ONE Championship: Pursuit of Power on July 13, 2018. He lost the fight via unanimous decision.

He made his sophomore appearance against Christian Lee at ONE Championship: Heart of the Lion on November 9, 2018. He lost the fight via first-round technical knockout.

He then faced Adrian Pang at ONE Championship: Warriors Of Light on May 10, 2019. He won the fight via second-round technical knockout.

He next faced Johnny Nuñez at ONE Championship: Dawn Of Valor on October 26, 2019. He won the fight via unanimous decision.

=== Rizin ===
Tokudome faced Roberto de Souza at Rizin 27 on March 21, 2021. After taking Souza down, he was quickly submitted via triangle choke in the first round.

Tokudome returned to Rizin over three years later at Rizin 47 as he faced kickboxer Sho Patrick Usami on June 9, 2024. He lost the bout via knockout in the first round.

== Championships and achievements ==
=== Mixed martial arts ===
- Ultimate Fighting Championship
  - Fight of the Night (one time) vs. Yui Chul Nam
- Pancrase
  - Pancrase Lightweight Championship (one time; former)
    - One successful title defense

== Mixed martial arts record ==
Professional record breakdown
33 matches	20 wins	12 losses
By knockout	10	6
By submission	3	3
By decision	7	3
Draws	1	

Res.	Record	Opponent	Method	Event	Date	Round	Time	Location	Notes
Loss	20–12–1	Sho Patrick Usami	KO (punches)	Rizin 47	June 9, 2024	1	2:29	Tokyo, Japan	
Loss	20–11–1	Roberto de Souza	Submission (triangle choke)	Rizin 27	March 21, 2021	1	1:44	Nagoya, Japan	Return to Lightweight.
Win	20–10–1	Johnny Nuñez	Decision (unanimous)	ONE: Dawn Of Valor	October 26, 2019	3	5:00	Jakarta, Indonesia	
Win	19–10–1	Adrian Pang	TKO (doctor stoppage)	ONE: Warriors of Light	May 10, 2019	2	1:27	Bangkok, Thailand	Welterweight debut.
Loss	18–10–1	Christian Lee	TKO (punches)	ONE: Heart of the Lion	November 9, 2018	1	2:47	Kallang, Singapore	Catchweight (160 lb) bout.
Loss	18–9–1	Jadamba Narantungalag	Decision (unanimous)	ONE: Pursuit of Power	July 13, 2018	3	5:00	Kuala Lumpur, Malaysia	
Loss	18–8–1	Takasuke Kume	KO (punch)	Pancrase 292	December 10, 2017	1	1:21	Tokyo, Japan	For the Pancrase Lightweight Championship.
Win	18–7–1	Kieran Joblin	Decision (unanimous)	Pancrase 288	July 2, 2017	3	5:00	Tokyo, Japan	
Win	17–7–1	Akira Okada	TKO (punches)	Pancrase 286	April 23, 2017	1	0:28	Tokyo, Japan	
Loss	16–7–1	Takasuke Kume	TKO (punches)	Pancrase 280	September 11, 2016	1	4:45	Tokyo, Japan	Lost the Pancrase Lightweight Championship.
Win	16–6–1	Akbarh Arreola	TKO (punches)	Pancrase 277	April 23, 2016	1	4:59	Tokyo, Japan	Defended the Pancrase Lightweight Championship.
Win	15–6–1	Satoru Kitaoka	KO (punches)	Pancrase 271	November 1, 2015	4	1:24	Tokyo, Japan	Won the vacant Pancrase Lightweight Championship.
Win	14–6–1	J.J. Ambrose	Decision (unanimous)	Pancrase 267	May 31, 2015	3	5:00	Tokyo, Japan	
Win	13–6–1	Yoshihiro Koyama	KO (punches)	Pancrase 265	March 15, 2015	1	1:38	Tokyo, Japan	
Loss	12–6–1	Johnny Case	Technical Submission (guillotine choke)	UFC Fight Night: Hunt vs. Nelson	September 20, 2014	2	2:34	Saitama, Japan	
Loss	12–5–1	Nam Yui-chul	Decision (split)	The Ultimate Fighter China Finale: Kim vs. Hathaway	March 1, 2014	3	5:00	Macau, SAR, China	Fight of the Night.
Loss	12–4–1	Norman Parke	Decision (unanimous)	UFC 162	July 6, 2013	3	5:00	Las Vegas, Nevada, United States	
Win	12–3–1	Cristiano Marcello	Decision (unanimous)	UFC on Fuel TV: Silva vs. Stann	March 3, 2013	3	5:00	Saitama, Japan	
Win	11–3–1	Kengo Ura	Submission (armbar)	Pancrase: Progress Tour 9	August 5, 2012	3	5:00	Tokyo, Japan	
Win	10–3–1	Jo Jung-hyun	Submission (armbar)	Pancrase: Progress Tour 4	April 1, 2012	1	4:51	Tokyo, Japan	
Loss	9–3–1	Isao Kobayashi	TKO (punches)	Pancrase: Impressive Tour 13	December 3, 2011	1	4:14	Tokyo, Japan	
Win	9–2–1	Kota Okazawa	Decision (unanimous)	Pancrase: Impressive Tour 8	August 7, 2011	3	5:00	Tokyo, Japan	
Win	8–2–1	Hiroki Aoki	Decision (unanimous)	Pancrase: Impressive Tour 4	May 3, 2011	3	5:00	Tokyo, Japan	
Win	7–2–1	Junichi Ota	TKO (punches)	Pancrase: Impressive Tour 1	February 6, 2011	1	2:55	Tokyo, Japan	
Win	6–2–1	Shigenobu Takahashi	TKO (punches)	Pancrase: Passion Tour 11	December 5, 2010	1	3:33	Tokyo, Japan	
Loss	5–2–1	Maciej Gorski	TKO (head kick and punch)	KSW 14: Judgment Day	September 18, 2010	1	3:24	Łódź, Poland	
Win	5–1–1	Yuma Ishizuka	TKO (punches)	World Victory Road Presents: Sengoku Raiden Championships 13	June 20, 2010	1	3:22	Tokyo, Japan	
Win	4–1–1	Takafumi Ito	TKO (punches)	Pancrase: Passion Tour 4	April 29, 2010	1	3:45	Tokyo, Japan	
Win	3–1–1	Arata Fujimoto	Submission (armbar)	GCM: Cage Force 12	September 12, 2009	1	2:01	Tokyo, Japan	
Win	2–1–1	Takashi Ito	TKO (doctor stoppage)	Deep: clubDeep Hachioji	August 2, 2009	2	4:14	Tokyo, Japan	
Win	1–1–1	Yasuhiro Kirita	Submission (armbar)	Zst: Swat! 25	June 7, 2009	2	0:15	Tokyo, Japan	
Draw	0–1–1	Masayuki Hamagishi	Draw (time limit)	Zst: Swat! 16	March 16, 2008	2	5:00	Tokyo, Japan	
Loss	0–1	Tomohiko Yoshida	Submission (kneebar)	Zst 15: Fifth Anniversary	November 23, 2007	1	4:42	Tokyo, Japan	Lightweight debut.
