= UFC on Fuel TV: Silva vs. Stann =

UFC mixed martial arts event in 2013

- The poster for UFC on Fuel TV: Silva vs. Stann
- Promotion: Ultimate Fighting Championship
- Date: March 3, 2013
- Venue: Saitama Super Arena
- City: Saitama, Japan
- Attendance: 14,682

Event chronology
UFC 157: Rousey vs. Carmouche	UFC on Fuel TV: Silva vs. Stann	UFC 158: St-Pierre vs. Diaz

UFC on Fuel TV: Silva vs. Stann (also known as UFC on Fuel TV 8) was a mixed martial arts event held by the Ultimate Fighting Championship on March 3, 2013, at the Saitama Super Arena in Saitama, Japan.

== Background ==
The main event was a light heavyweight bout between multidivisional contenders Wanderlei Silva and Brian Stann.

Diego Sanchez failed to make the 156 lb weight limit at the weigh ins, weighing at 158 lb. Sanchez was fined 20 percent of his earnings and the bout was contested at a catchweight of 158 lb.

== Results ==
Main card (Fuel TV)
Weight class				Method	Round	Time	Notes
Light Heavyweight	Wanderlei Silva	def.	Brian Stann	KO (punches)	2	4:08
Heavyweight	Mark Hunt	def.	Stefan Struve	TKO (punches)	3	1:44
Catchweight (158 lb)	Diego Sanchez	def.	Takanori Gomi	Decision (split) (29–28, 28–29, 29–28)	3	5:00
Middleweight	Yushin Okami	def.	Héctor Lombard	Decision (split) (28–29, 29–28, 29–28)	3	5:00
Featherweight	Rani Yahya	def.	Mizuto Hirota	Decision (unanimous) (29–28, 29–28, 29–28)	3	5:00
Welterweight	Dong Hyun Kim	def.	Siyar Bahadurzada	Decision (unanimous) (30–27, 30–27, 30–27)	3	5:00
Preliminary card (Facebook and YouTube)
Middleweight	Brad Tavares	def.	Riki Fukuda	Decision (unanimous) (29–28, 29–28, 30–27)	3	5:00
Bantamweight	Takeya Mizugaki	def.	Bryan Caraway	Decision (split) (28–29, 29–28, 29–28)	3	5:00
Lightweight	Kazuki Tokudome	def.	Cristiano Marcello	Decision (unanimous) (30–27, 30–27, 30–27)	3	5:00
Bantamweight	Alex Caceres	vs.	Kang Kyung-ho	No Contest	3	5:00	(Note: Originally ruled a Split Decision (28-29, 29-28, 29-28) victory for Caceres, result overturned due to testing positive for marijuana.)
Welterweight	Lim Hyun-gyu	def.	Marcelo Guimarães	KO (knee and punches)	2	4:00

== Bonus awards ==
Fighters were awarded $50,000 bonuses.

- Fight of the Night: Wanderlei Silva vs. Brian Stann
- Knockout of the Night: Mark Hunt and Wanderlei Silva
- Submission of the Night: Not awarded as no matches ended by submission.

== See also ==
- List of UFC events
- 2013 in UFC
