= Muay Thai =

Combat sport of Thailand

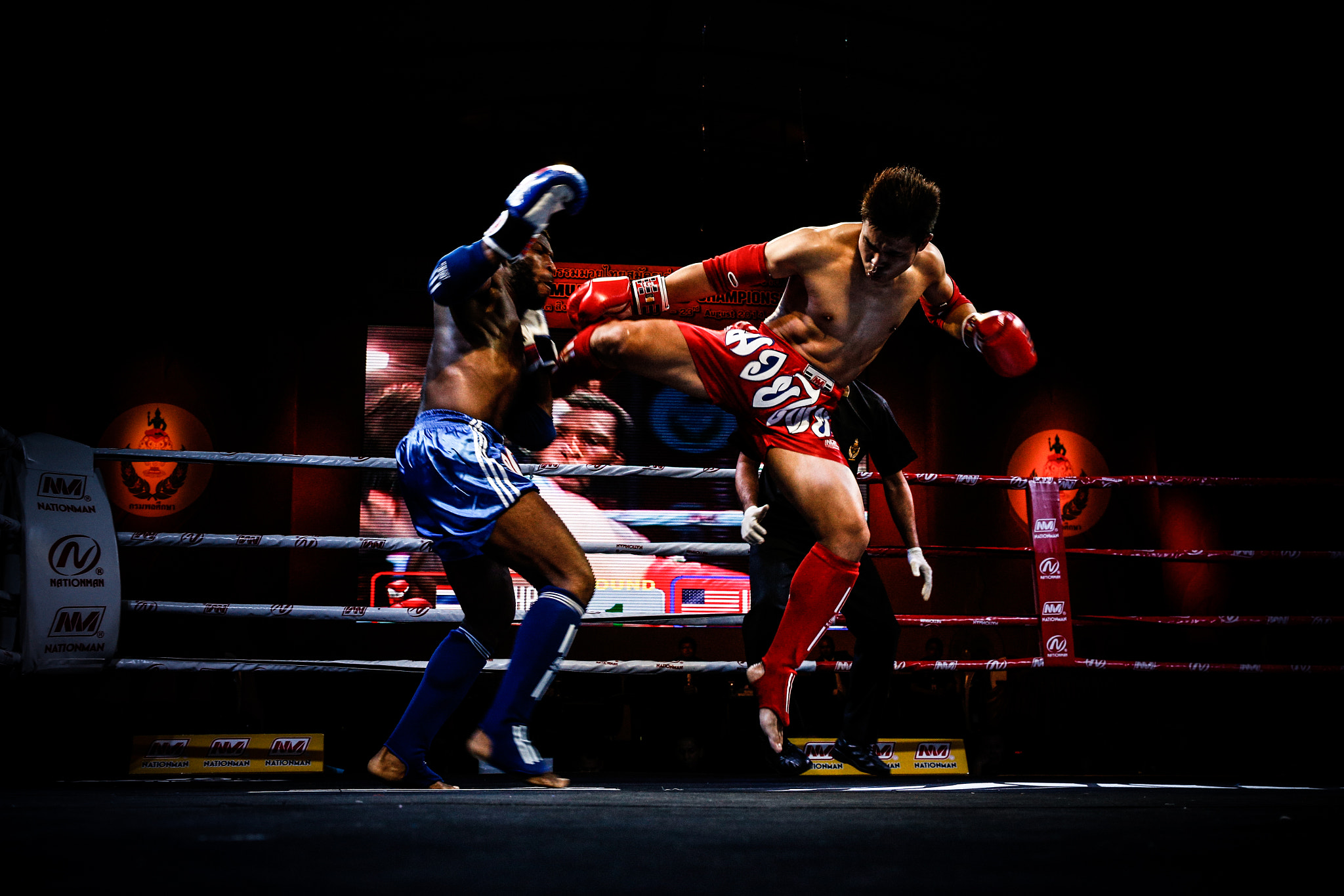
- A fighter leans back to evade a round kick
- Focus: Punching, striking, clinching
- Country of origin: Thailand
- Famous practitioners: List of Muay Thai practitioners
- Parenthood: Muay Boran; Krabi–krabong

Muay Thai
- Highest governing body: International Federation of Muaythai Associations
- First played: Thailand, 18th century (The current cultural relics data are insufficient to prove that it has a longer history.)

Characteristics
- Contact: Full contact
- Mixed-sex: No
- Type: Combat sport

Presence
- Country or region: Worldwide
- Olympic: No, but IOC recognized
- Paralympic: 2013-2016
- World Games: 2017, 2022

Muay Thai or Muaythai (Thai: มวยไทย, RTGS: muai thai, pronounced [mūaj tʰāj]), sometimes referred to as Thai boxing, the Art of Eight Limbs or the Science of Eight Limbs, is a Thai martial art and full-contact combat sport that uses stand-up striking, sweeps, and various clinching techniques. The name "Art of Eight Limbs" refers to the combined use of fists, elbows, knees and shins. Muay Thai became widespread internationally in the late 20th to 21st century, when Westernised practitioners from Thailand began competing in kickboxing and mixed-rules matches as well as matches under Muay Thai rules around the world. The professional league is governed by the Professional Boxing Association of Thailand, sanctioned by the Sports Authority of Thailand.

Muay Thai is related to other martial art styles of the Indian cultural sphere such as Musti-yuddha, Muay Chaiya, Muay Boran, Muay Lao, Lethwei, Kun Khmer, Benjang and Tomoi. A practitioner of Muay Thai is known as a Nak Muay. Western practitioners in Thailand are sometimes called Nak Muay Farang, meaning "foreign boxer".

== Etymology ==
The term Muay Thai is a Thai term that is a compound word made up of two basic words; muay and Thai.

- The term muay is derived from the Sanskrit root word mavya, which means "to pull together," "to form into a single group or unit," or "unity." It is defined as "to tie" and "sport boxing" in Thai. The alternative form of the Sanskrit word mavya is mavy (mavyati), (Sanskrit: मव्य् (मव्यति), lit. 'to bind, to tie, to fasten.') from its root term mav. (Sanskrit: मव)
- The term Thai comes from the word Tai, means "free" and "Tai-Kadai speakers." (Note: Linguists have chosen the term Tai to refer to the language family, while Thai typically refers to the national language of Thailand.)

The term Muay Thai is successor of the term Ram Mut Ram Muay (Thai: รำหมัดรำมวย) since the reign of King Rama II (1809–1824), and has thus entered into the global vocabulary.

The oldest text of the term Muay ever recorded is found in the palm-leaf manuscripts in Northern Thai language called Mungrai Law 1839 BE, enacted 1296 AD. The pronunciation of the word Muay existed in Thai people since prior Nanzhao period (738–902 AD) said in The History of Muay Thai by The Institute of the Art of Muay Thai, Department of Physical Education National Stadium of Thailand (DPE).

The historical term Tha Nai Lueak (Thai: ทนายเลือก, Thai pronunciation: [tʰá naːj lɯ̂ːak]), meaning "Nak Muay for the King's guard, the name of division to be in charge of Nak Muay." The term was adopted in the Law of the Military and Provincial Hierarchy 1998 BE since 1455, during the reign of King Borommatrailokkanat, and repealed during the reign (1851–1868) of King Mongkut.

=== Variant names ===
The term Muay Thai is also written in various languages, including Polish: boks tajski, Dutch: thai boxing, Finnish: thainyrkkeily, Russian: муай - тай, Korean: 무에타이, Japanese: ムエタイ, and Chinese: 泰拳.

== History ==
=== 7th century ===
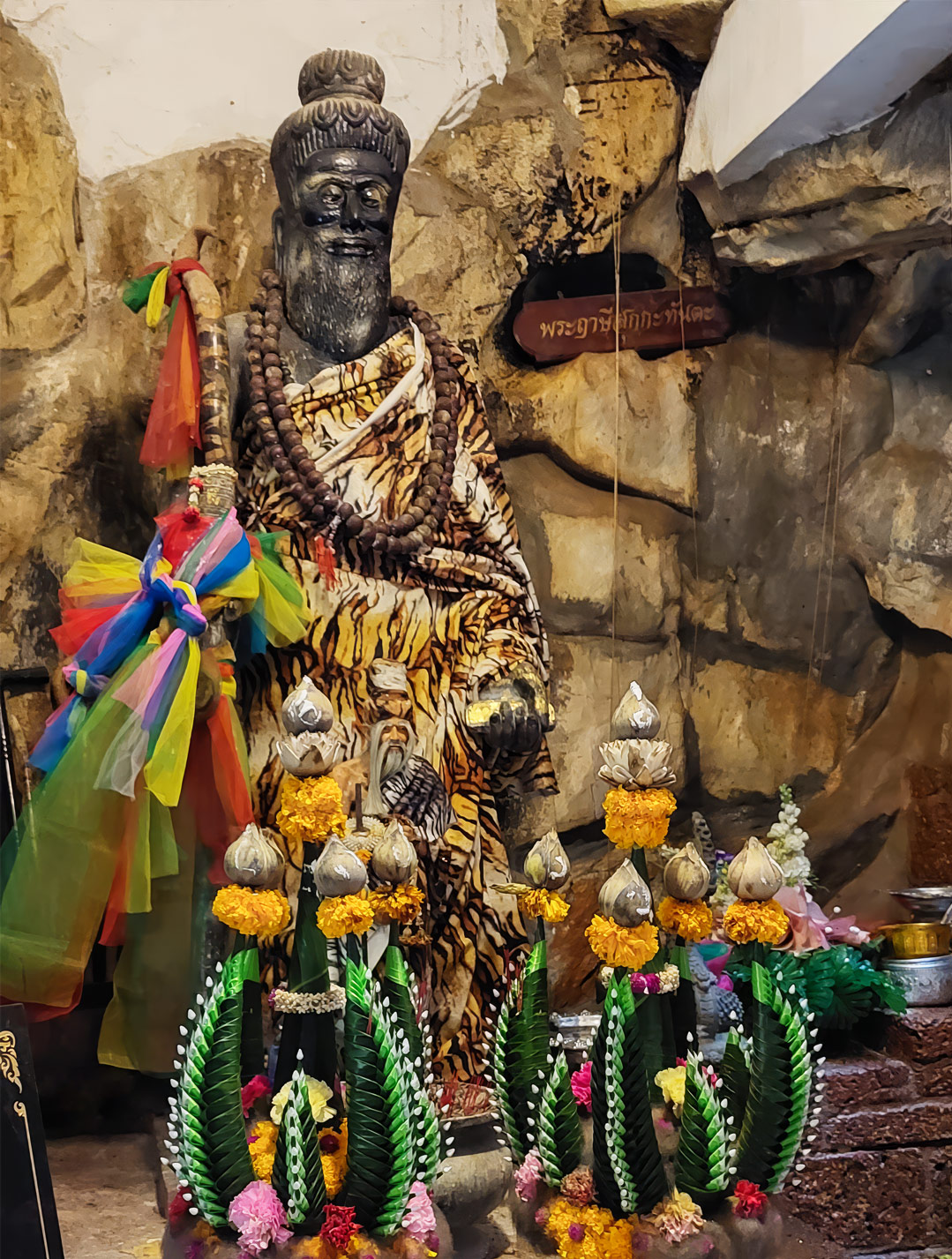
Statue of hermit Sukatanata, the Muay Thai martial art's progenitor, located at Khao Samo Khon hermitage, Lopburi province, Thailand, as recorded in the Yonok Chronicle

The earliest origin of Muay Thai dates back to the 657 AD Haripuñjaya period of a hermit named Sukatanata who established his school of liberal and martial arts consisting of Muay Thai, which will be mentioned in order of history compiled officially by The Institute of the Art of Muay Thai, Department of Physical Education National Stadium of Thailand (DPE).

From 738 AD in the Nanzhao period. Muay Thai had been trained from variant movements of dance; Fon jerng or jerng means "tactics" or "finesse", (Thai: ฟ้อนเจิง) included weapons and bare hands, showing the art of men's fighting, which is similar to Lei tai due to the war engagement with China for a long time. It is said to be the earliest stage of Thai people forming, and Muay Thai had been training for generations along the Fon jerng dance. The Fon jerng also became one of the recreational Thai classical dances in Northern Thailand, existing nowadays.

=== 10th century ===
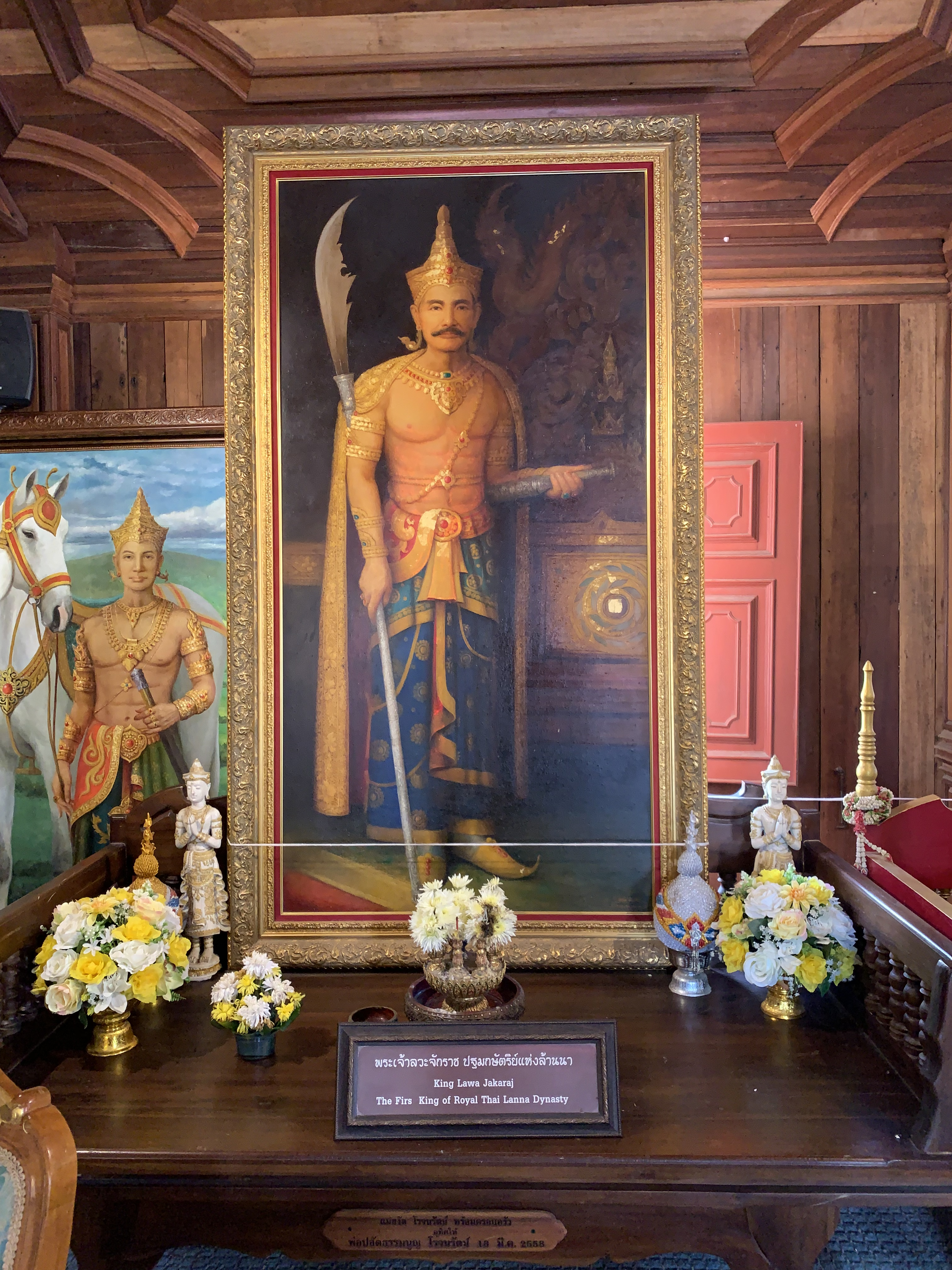
A painting of King Lavachakkaraj inside the ubosot of Wat Ming Mueang, Chiang Rai province, Thailand.

After the Northern Thai people, led by King Lavachakkaraj, who ruled the town of Fang (Thai: เมืองฝาง) (now Uttaradit province, Thailand), founded the Singhanavati Kingdom, known as Yonoknakhon (757–1188), they continued to expand their territory by seizing and establishing kingdoms, such as the Lan Na Kingdom, Phayao Kingdom, Haripuñjaya, and Lampang.

From 947 AD onward, they conquered various ethnic groups, including the Khom ethnic groups, aboriginal Siamese (known as Siam-asli, Saimi-mandala, Siamese Lavo, Xiān, or Siam at that time), and Mon-Khmer in the upper part of the Chao Phraya River basin, using their martial arts skills (Muay). The Tai people then moved down northwest and successfully established the Sukhothai Kingdom (1238–1438) under the rule of King Si Inthrathit, who was a descendant of King Phrom, a descendant of the Singhanavati Dynasty (King Lavachakkaraj). This is mentioned in the folklore, the Legend of Singhanavati.

The Mungrai Customary Law 1296 CE (Mungraiyashastra), one of the oldest palm-leaf manuscripts written in the Northern Thai language during the reign of King Mangrai, who established the town of Chiang Mai (1292–1311), also mentioned the Tai martial arts (Muay) in section 7, under the article of 18 types of quarrels, for the first time in the Lan Na Kingdom. In the folklore, the Legend of the Phayao Kingdom (1094–1338), the version by Wat Sriboonrueng mentioned the Tai martial arts (Muay) known as jerng tiw khui during the reign of King Chueang Maharat (1115–1162).

=== 13th century ===
During the Pre-Ayutthaya era (Ayodhya period) before 1351, the Royal Chronicle of the North documented King Uthong's (Note: Not be confused with King Uthong who established the Ayutthaya Kingdom in 1351 CE.) importation of Muay boxers from the city of Sri Phalo (now Chonburi province, Thailand) to the city-state of Ayodhya. This occurred during his reign from 1253 to 1289, and a Muay boxing match between a Siamese boxer and a Chinese boxer also took place during the late reign of King Suwanracha, who ruled Ayodhya from 1301 to 1310. Furthermore, the Siam-Thai of Ayutthaya (known as Gywan and Siam-Asli) launched an attack on the Thaton kingdom in 1056 CE. They expanded their territory southward and used their martial arts skills (Muay) to penetrate deep into the Malay Peninsula before 1160 CE. These events are recorded in various historical sources, including the Burmese chronicle, Hmannan Yazawin, the Malay annals (Sulalatus Salatin), and the History of the Malay Kingdom of Patani (Sejarah Kerajaan Melayu Patani).

During the Sukhothai Kingdom from 1238 to 1268, Muay Thai was highly regarded as an art form and was even included in the curriculum for members of the royal family. It was seen as a way to train brave warriors with exceptional physical fitness, as well as prepare them for leadership and warfare against neighboring kingdoms. King Si Inthrathit sent his second son, aged 13, Prince Ram Khamhaeng, to study Dharma, liberal arts, and martial arts (Muay) at the Samo Khon School in Lawapura town (now Lopburi province, Thailand), Lavo Kingdom. It was here that Prince Ram Khamhaeng formed a close bond with Prince Ngam Mueang, who would later become the King of Phayao Kingdom in 1258, as mentioned in the Yonok Chronicles:

King Ngam Mueang of the Phayao Kingdom was the son of the ninth king, King Ming Mueang. He was a descendant of King Chom Tham, who was the son of King Khun Ngearn of Ngoenyang. At the age of 14, he received training in the principles of Brahman's sorcery at Thep Isitana School, Khao Doi Duan. (Note: Khao Doi Duan is located in the Chiang Rai province, Thailand.) He then continued his training in liberal and martial arts (Muay) with the same instructor who had also taught King Ram Khamhaeng in Lawapura. After turning 16, he attended the Samo Khon School, established by a hermit named Sukatanata. It was here that he became comrades with King Ram Khamhaeng of Sukhothai, as they had both trained under the same instructor. (Note: The original text is written in Thai: พระยางำเมืองเจ้านครพะเยาตนนี้ เป็นบุตรพระยามิ่งเมืองผู้ครองเมืองพะเยาลำดับที่ ๙ ตั้งแต่ขุนจอมธรรมเป็นต้นมา [...] เมื่อเจริญชนมายุได้ ๑๔ ปี ได้เรียนศาสตรเพทกับเทพอิสิตนอยู่ ณ ภูเขาดอยด้วน ครั้นชนมายุได้ ๑๖ ปี ไปเรียนศิลปในสำนักพระสุกทันตฤๅษี ณ กรุงละโว้ อาจารย์เดียวกันกับสมเด็จพระร่วงเจ้ากรุงสุโขทัย เหตุดังนั้นพระยางำเมืองกับสมเด็จพระร่วงเจ้ากรุงสุโขทัยจึงได้เป็นสหายแก่กัน)

— The Yonok Chronicles: Version by the National Library of Thailand (1961).

The Samo Khon school was founded in 657 AD during the Haripuñjaya period by a hermit named Sukatanata (Thai: พระฤๅษีสุกกะทันตะ). He taught a variety of subjects, collectively known as Maiya Shastra (ಮೈಶಾಸ್ತ್ರ), which included martial arts (Muay), sword fighting, archery, and elephant and horse control. One of the most notable alumni of the school was King Mangrai. The Hermitage of Sukatanata still exists today and can be accessed at Wat Khao Samo Khon in Lopburi province, Thailand.

King Ram Khamhaeng also composed a war strategy manual during his reign that also mentioned Muay Thai. Later, King Maha Thammaracha I was trained in essential subjects as well as practical skills, including martial arts (Muay) for self-defense with bare hands and the use of weapons. Muay Thai was also taught at temples, which served as learning centers for the Tai peoples, following the guidelines of King Ram Khamhaeng's war strategy manual.

=== 15th century ===
In 1431 AD, King Borommarachathirat II, the King of Ayutthaya Kingdom, led Siamese forces and included groups of Siamese boxers to assault the Khmers plundering Angkor Thom, also known as the Fall of Angkor in 1431. King Borommarachathirat II built an inscription of Khun Sri Chaiya Raj Mongkol Thep for the victory monument and Siamese warriors' commemoration, which inscribed a list of Siamese warriors and assault record in the inscription after the Angkor had already been captured, as well as written in A Lost Chronicle of Ayutthaya by Michael Vickery, stanzas 9–11.

The inscription of Khun Sri Chaiya Raj Mongkol Thep (N.M. 78, Face 2) 1431 AD reads:

King Borommarachathirat II of Ayutthaya commanded his warrior, Khun Sri Chaiya Raj Mongkol Thep, to march four military forces to assault Angkor Thom, Phimai, and Phanom Rung to become states under his endless mandate. The King then assigned Khun Sri Chaiya Raj Mongkol Thep, groups of Siamese boxers (Muay), and military forces with elephants and horse battalions to the retreat procession to the Kingdom of Ayutthaya. (Note: The original text is transliterated in Thai: สมเด็จพระอินทรามหาบรมจักรพรรดิธรรมิกราชเป็นเจ้าให้ขุนศรีไชยราชมงคลเทพเอาจตุรงค์ช้างม้ารี้พลไปโจมจับพระนครพิมายพนมรุ้งเป็นราชเสมาแลราบทาบดังพระมโนสากัลป์แลจึงจะละพระราชเสาวนีย์หาขุนศรีไชยราชมงคลเทพแดฝูงมวยลูกขุนทั้งหลาย เอาช้างม้ารี้พลถอยคืนมา)

— King Borommarachathirat II, the inscription of Khun Sri Chaiya Raj Mongkol Thep (1431)

From 1455 AD in the Ayutthaya period, Muay Thai was officially integrated with Siamese royal courts of Ayutthaya called The King's Guard Department (Thai: กรมทนายเลือก) since the reign of King Borommatrailokkanat enacted the Law of the Military and Provincial Hierarchy 1998 BE (1455 AD), which consisted of two director generals with noble titles, Khun Phakdeeasa (Thai: ขุนภักดีอาสา) and Khun Yothaphakdee (Thai: ขุนโยธาภักดี) in the hierarchy. There were countless skilled Siamese boxers in The King's Unarmed Guard Division (Thai: กรมนักมวย), a sub-division of The King's Guard Department, picked from competition by the king to be his private guards and patrol the royal palace as major missions. The boxing competitions occur in peace situations as well as to safeguard the king at war.

There was also the law mentioned of Muay in the reign of King Ekathotsarot (1590–1605), called Miscellaneous Laws (Phra Aiyakan Betset), which states:

CLAUSE 117: ARTICLE I. Second-class people who fight by boxing (Muay) or wrestling, which then results in injuries or death, cannot be penalized... (Note: In Thai: 117 มาตราหนึ่ง ชนชั้นสองเป็นเอกจิกเอกฉันท์ตีมวยด้วยกันก็ดี แลปล้ำกันก็ดี แลผู้หนึ่งต้องเจ็บปวดก็ดี ขั้นหักถึงแก่มรณภาพก็ดี ท่านว่าหามีโทษมิได้...)

— Phra Aiyakan Betset enacted by King Ekathotsarot, The Three Seals Law (Tra Samduang Law 1978: 438-439)

The well-known Siamese boxers during the Ayutthaya period include King Naresuan, King Suriyenthrathibodi, and Nai Khanom Tom.

=== 16th century ===
According to history, Muay Thai had been developed by the Siamese army as a form of self-defense and to date back at least to the 13th century, according to King Ram Khamhaeng's war strategics manual. In Ayutthaya Kingdom, the war strategics manual was recomposed in 1518 by King Ramathibodi II called Tamra Phichaisongkram (Thai: ตำราพิชัยสงคราม).

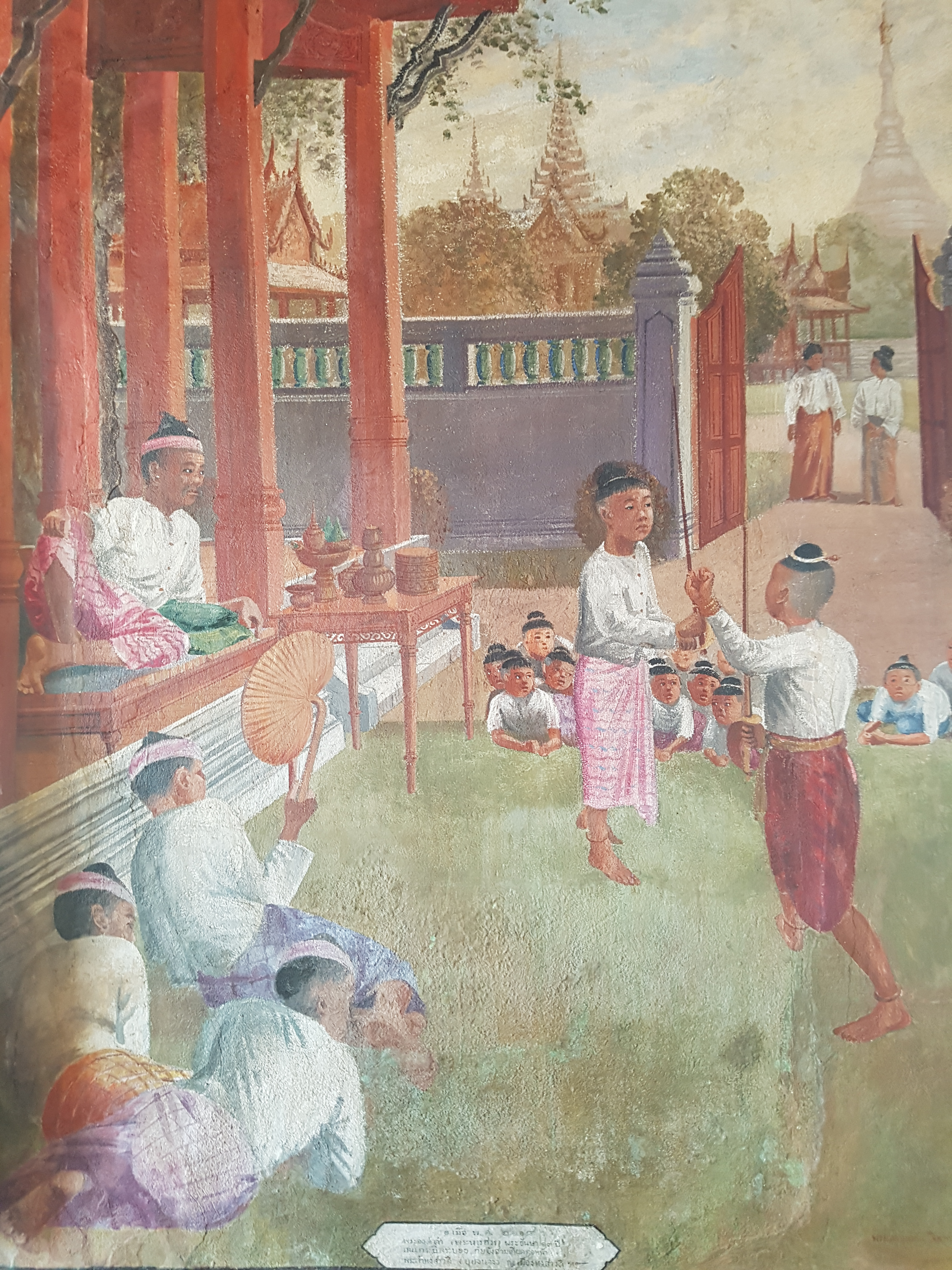
The mural paintings of the martial play of Naresuan, the crown prince of Ayutthaya, with Mingyi Swa, the crown prince of Taungoo, in 1565 CE

King Naresuan practiced martial arts and rearranged his soldiers for 15 years at peacetime. He had learned warrior fighting techniques from Burmese royal courts after he was raised on his age 9 by King Bayinnaung for 6 years in Burma after the invasion by Bayinnaung's army to Ayutthaya Kingdom in the Burmese–Siamese War (1563–1564). King Naresuan also improved the war strategics manual version of King Ramathibodi II to the version of King Naresuan after he was backed to Ayutthaya Kingdom to be capable of self-defense in war engagements during his reign.

In 1687, Simon de la Loubère, a French diplomat to Siam of King Louis XIV, handwrote that Muay Thai was one of the occupations of Siamese people in his famous book, Du Royaume de Siam, during the reign of King Narai, which reads:

La chaleur du climat fait en eux affez de diſſipation. La lutte, & le combat à coups de poing ou de coude y ſont des mêtiers de batteleur. La courſe des balons eſt donc leur ſeul exercice.

(Translation): Hot weather weakened the Siamese people to be tired. Wrestling and fighting with fists or elbows (Muay Thai) were just their occupations. Thence, paddling courses were only their exercises.

— Simon de la Loubère, Du Royaume de Siam : Envoyé extraordinaire du ROY auprès du Roy de Siam en 1687 & 1688

In 1698, according to the second French mission to Siam by King Louis XIV, who after appointed Guy Tachard to be in charge of the French ambassador to Siam. Muay Thai was being trained to prepare for an engagement with a French expeditionary force after the Dutch captain informed the Siamese Royal Court of the news about French battleships to siege Puducherry and Myeik seaports of the Kingdom of Ayutthaya in the reign of King Phetracha after the Siamese revolution of 1688.

Monsieur Braud's letter to Directors of the International Affairs Kingdom of Ayutthaya (June 9, 1699) reads:

This news caused vassals of the Siamese Royal Court to be suddenly shocked. King Phetracha then announced the force recruitment to train fighting techniques such as wrestling, muay, krabi-krabong, and many others. These training courses carried a heavy burden on the veterans. (Note: In Thai: ข่าวอันนี้ได้ทำให้ข้าราชการในราชสำนักตกใจเป็นอันมาก พระเจ้ากรุงสยามจึงได้ตั้งต้นเกณฑ์คนฝึกหัดการต่าง ๆ บางทีหัดให้ปล้ำกัน บางทีหัดให้ต่อยมวย บางทีหัดกระบี่กระบอง และหัดการต่าง ๆ ชนิดนี้อีกหลายอย่าง การฝึกเหล่านี้ได้ทำให้ขุนนางข้าราชการมีงานมากขึ้น)

— Monsieur Braud, Letter to Directors of the International Affairs Kingdom of Ayutthaya (June 9, 1699)

=== 18th century ===
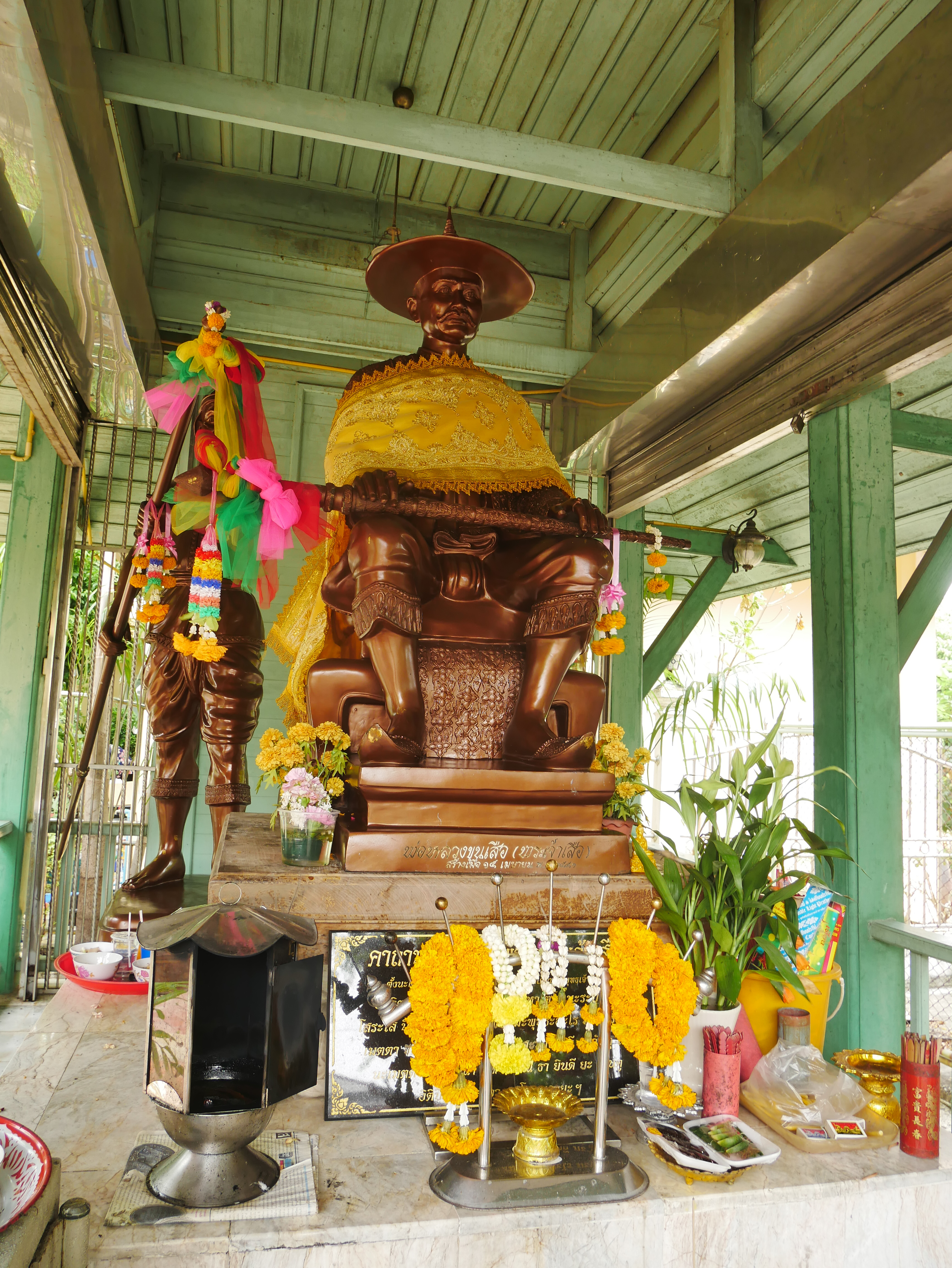
World Muay Thai Day is observed globally on 6 February to commemorate King Sanphet VIII (Phra Chao Suea, the 'Tiger King'). The date marks the anniversary of his coronation in 1702 and reflects his traditional association with Muay Thai.

In the 1702 reign of King Suriyenthrathibodi. The king questioned his vassals about the Siamese people festival held outside the boundary of Ayutthaya Royal Palace. The government official responded to the king that the temple fair will be held at Khwaeng Wiset Chai Chan (now Ang Thong province). Tomorrow, there are Buddhist monastery celebrations, grand competitions, and amusements. King Suriyenthrathibodi then responded back that he had not punched Muay boxing for a long time since enthroned, and he decided to join Muay boxing competitions tomorrow.

On the next festival day, King Suriyenthrathibodi disguised himself as the general public with a few royal guards and went to the festival by boat to join the Muay boxing competitions, and he won both the first and second matches during the competition, as the Royal Chronicle of the Kingdom of Ayutthaya reads:

King Suriyenthrathibodi requested the second match; the boxing referee then rearranged another rival to compete with him. King Suriyenthrathibodi won again among loudly applauded by the general public and got an award for one baht fifty satang. Later, he got on his boat and enjoyed the result of the competition, then went back to Krung Sri Ayutthaya. (Note: The Royal Chronicle of the Kingdom of Ayutthaya is written in Thai: จึ่งดำรัสให้ข้าหลวงว่าแก่นายสยาม ให้จัดหาคู่มาเปรียบอีก แลนายสนามก็จัดหาคู่มาได้อีกแล้วให้ชกกัน แลคนมวยผู้นั้น ธารบุญมิได้ก็แพ้ในกึ่งยก คนทังหลายสรรเสรีญฝีมือพระหัถมี่ไป แล้วว่ามวยกรุงคนนี้มีฝีมือยี่งนักแลนายสนามก็ตกรางวันให้เหมือนหนหลังนั้น แล้วสมเดจ์พระเจ้าอยู่หัวก็ภาข้าหลวงคืนมาสู่เรือพระธินั่งค่อยสำราญพระราชหฤไท แล้วเสดจ์กลับยังกรุงเทพมหานคร ๚ะ๛)

— Somdet Phra Phonnarat (Vanaratana) of Wat Pho, The Royal Chronicle of the Kingdom of Ayutthaya: Version by Somdet Phra Phonnarat of Wat Phra Chettuphon (1795)

The Royal Chronicle of the Kingdom of Rattanakosin: First Reign, documents the arrival of two French boxing brothers in Bangkok in 1788. They had come to compete in a boxing match for a monetary prize. Seeking to compete with a Siamese boxer, they enlisted the help of an interpreter to convey their request to a Siamese nobleman, Chaophraya Phra Khlang (Hon). This nobleman then brought the matter to the attention of King Rama I. The King, in turn, consulted with his younger brother, Prince Maha Sura Singhanat of the Front Palace, and made a plea:

Since the foreigners have made a challenge, it would be considered an insult if we did not come up with Thai boxers to compete against them. It would be said that no Thais in all the capital could fight. Our reputation would suffer. The dishonor would spread abroad. I beg you to find a Thai boxer skillful enough to inflict a resounding defeat.

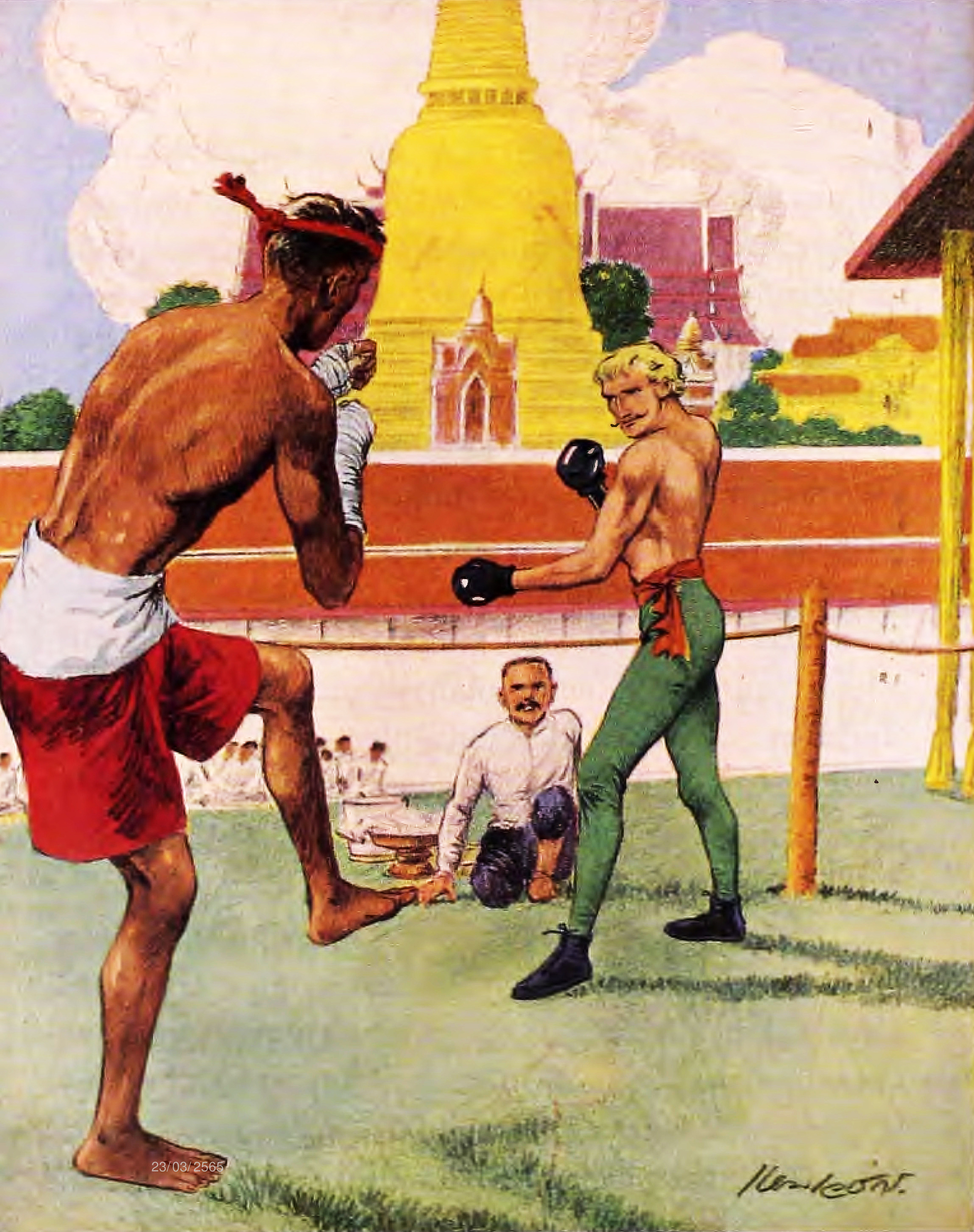
A painting by Hem Vejakorn depicts a Frenchman challenging a Siamese man, Muean Phlan, to a boxing match in 1788

King Rama I accepted his brother's advice and asked a nobleman to inform the Frenchmen that a match would be arranged with a purse of fifty Chang (equivalent to 4,000 baht at the time). Prince Maha Sura Singhanat personally supervised the construction of a suitable arena and prepared the Siamese boxer.

On the day of the boxing competition, King Rama I, his younger brother, and many members of the Siamese royal court were present as spectators near the western theater of Wat Phra Kaew. Prince Maha Sura Singhanat arranged for a Siamese boxer from the Front Palace King's Guard Department named Muean Phlan to compete against the younger of the French brothers. During the match, Muean Phlan constantly evaded his opponent, making it difficult for the younger French brother to get a hold of him. As the elder French brother rushed to assist his younger sibling, Prince Maha Sura Singhanat also joined the fight and knocked the elder brother down. All the umpires rushed to help the Siamese boxer, and the Frenchmen were treated harshly. After Rama I had the two French brothers receive physical therapy, they soon departed.

=== Folklore of Nai Khanom Tom ===
The popular folklore story of Nai Khanom Tom is widely celebrated in Thailand and around the world and the character is referred to as the "father of Muay Thai." Several scholars have critically examined the legend of Nai Khanom Tom, suggesting it is mythological rather than historical. Scholars suggest that the story of Nai Khanom Tom probably emerged in the 20th century, coinciding with efforts by Thai cultural institutions to construct a cohesive national identity. During the post-World War II era, figures like Luang Wichitwathakan played pivotal roles in promoting Thai nationalism, often through the creation and dissemination of cultural myths. The legend of Nai Khanom Tom serves as a case study in the invention of tradition, where folklore is utilized to foster national unity and cultural continuity.

In his book Muay Thai: Inventing Tradition for a National Symbol, Peter Vail argues that the story has been used to construct Thai national identity and serves more as a cultural symbol than a verifiable historical account. Similarly, historian Craig J. Reynolds, in his 1991 book National Identity and Its Defenders: Thailand, 1939–1989, discusses how Thai historical narratives were shaped in the post-World War II era to promote national unity, including the elevation of figures like Nai Khanom Tom without historical documentation. Scholars emphasize the lack of contemporary sources and suggest the legend likely emerged or was amplified during Thailand's modern nation-building period.

According to the popular folklore story, in 1767, after the second fall of Ayutthaya Kingdom from the Burmese–Siamese War (1765–1767), the invading Burmese troops rounded up thousands of Siamese citizens and brought to Burma. They then organized a seven-day, seven-night religious festival in honor of Buddha's relics. The festivities included many forms of entertainment, such as costume plays, comedies, and sword-fighting matches. King Hsinbyushin wanted to see how Thai fighters would compare to his fighters. Nai Khanom Tom was selected to fight against the King's chosen champion, and the boxing ring was set up in front of the throne. When the fight began, Nai Khanom Tom charged out, using punches, kicks, elbows, and knees to pummel his opponent until he collapsed. The King supposedly asked if Nai Khanom Tom would fight nine other Burmese champions to prove himself. He agreed and fought one after the other with no rest periods. His last opponent was a great kickboxing teacher from Rakhine State whom Nai Khanom Tom defeated with kicks.

It had been said that King Hsinbyushin was allegedly so impressed that he remarked in The Royal Chronicle of the Kingdom of Ayutthaya:

While King Hsinbyushin of Burma was residing at Yangon to raise an umbrella crown of the Shwedagon Pagoda for celebration, a Burmese nobleman informed him of a Siamese-skilled muay thai man. The King then stated a royal order to arrange for a Siamese man named Nai Khanom Tom, a famous fighter from Ayutthaya, to confront a Burmese boxer in front of the throne. The first round, the latter collapsed by Nai Khanom Tom, and the other round he confronted nine and ten other Burmese boxers. King Hsinbyushin was applauding him and said that Siamese was in a dangerous situation, but he could confront opponents up to nine and ten while unarmed. Because of King of Ayutthaya's negligent behavior that caused the aftermath of Ayutthaya Kingdom, the kingdom could stay if he's good. King Hsinbyushin then royally rewarded Nai Khanom Tom as should. (Note: In Thai: ฝ่ายพระเจ้าอังวะยังอยู่ ณะ เมืองย่างกุ้ง ทำการยกฉัตรยอดพระมหาเจดีย์เกษธาตุสำเรจ์แล้วให้มีการฉลอง จึ่งขุนนางพม่ากราบทูลว่า คนมวยเมืองไทมีฝีมือดียิ่งนัก จึ่งตรัสสั่งให้จัดหามาได้นายขนมต้มคนหนึ่ง เปนมวยดีมีฝีมือแต่ครั้งกรุงเก่า เอาตัวมาถวายพระเจ้าอังวะ พระเจ้าอังวะจึ่งให้จัดพม่าคนมวยเข้ามาเปรียบกับนายขนมต้มได้กันแล้ว ก็ให้ชกกันหน้าพระธินั่ง แลนายขนมต้มชกพม่าไม่ทันถึ่งยกก็แพ้ แล้วจัดคนอื่นเข้ามาเปรียบชกอิก นายขนมต้มชกพม่าชกมอญแพ้ถึ่งเก้าคนสิบคนสู้ไม่ได้ พระเจ้าอังวะทอดพระเนตรยกพระหัตถ์ตบพระอุระตรัสสรรเสรีญฝีมือนายขนมต้มว่า ไทมีพิศม์อยู่ทั่วตัว แต่มือเปล่าไม่มีอาวุธเลยยังสู้ได้ คนเดียวชณะถึ่งเก้าคนสิบคนฉนี้ เพราะจ้าวนายไม่ดีจึ่งเสียบ้านเมืองแก่ข้าศึก ถ้าจ้าวนายดีแล้วไหนเลยจะเสียกรุงศรีอยุทธยา แล้วพระราชทานรางวัลแก่นายขนมต้มโดยสมควร)

This historiography was largely extrapolated from brief mentions in written records, including four episodes in the royal chronicles of the 18th century: one where King Sanphet VIII fought an incognito match at a temple fair, Khwaeng Mueang Wiset Chai Chan in 1702; one where Nai Khanom Tom, as a war captive following the fall of Ayutthaya, fought in front of the Burmese king and defeated ten Burmese fighters; one of the military commander Phraya Phichai Dap Hak, who in his youth was a Muay Thai fighter; and one of Muen Phlan, who was chosen by King Rama I to fight against two French challengers in 1788.

To commemorate the story of Nai Khanom Tom, the Muay Thai Festival and Wai Khru Muay Thai Ceremony are staged annually on March 17 as "Muay Thai Day" in Thailand.

Every year on March 17, Thailand celebrates Nai Khanom Tom day.

=== 19th century ===
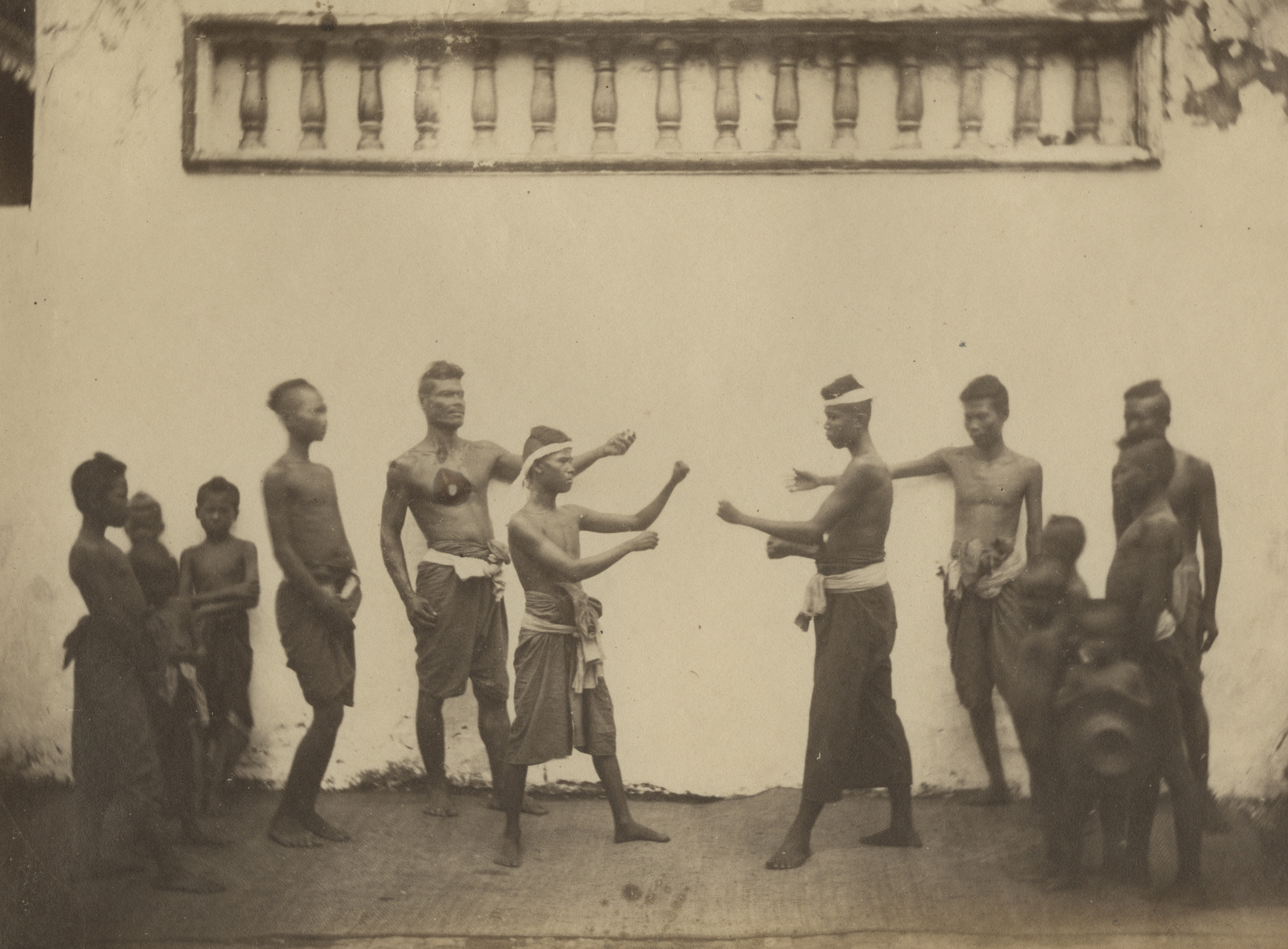
Muay Thai match in Siam 1865 by John Thomson

The ascension of King Chulalongkorn (Rama V) to the throne in 1868 ushered in a golden age not only for Muay but for the whole country of Thailand. Muay progressed greatly during the reign of Rama V as a direct result of the king's personal interest in the sport. The country was at peace and Muay functioned as a means of physical exercise, self-defense, attacking, recreation and personal advancement.

To increase interest in Muay Thai, King Chulalongkorn implemented nationwide tournaments and established a Royal Boxing Center, known as Muay Luang or Royal Boxers, similar to the Muay Fighters Regiment during the Ayutthaya Period, to administer the training of both Muay Thai and Krabi–krabong. He also bestowed the title of Muen, a Thai nobility rank, to the victor of each match. In 1887, the Department of Education (now the Department of Physical Education, Ministry of Tourism and Sports (Thailand)) was established by King Chulalongkorn, with Muay Thai being included as a subject in the national curriculum for both physical education teacher training schools and the Chulachomklao Royal Military Academy (CRMA).

=== 20th century ===
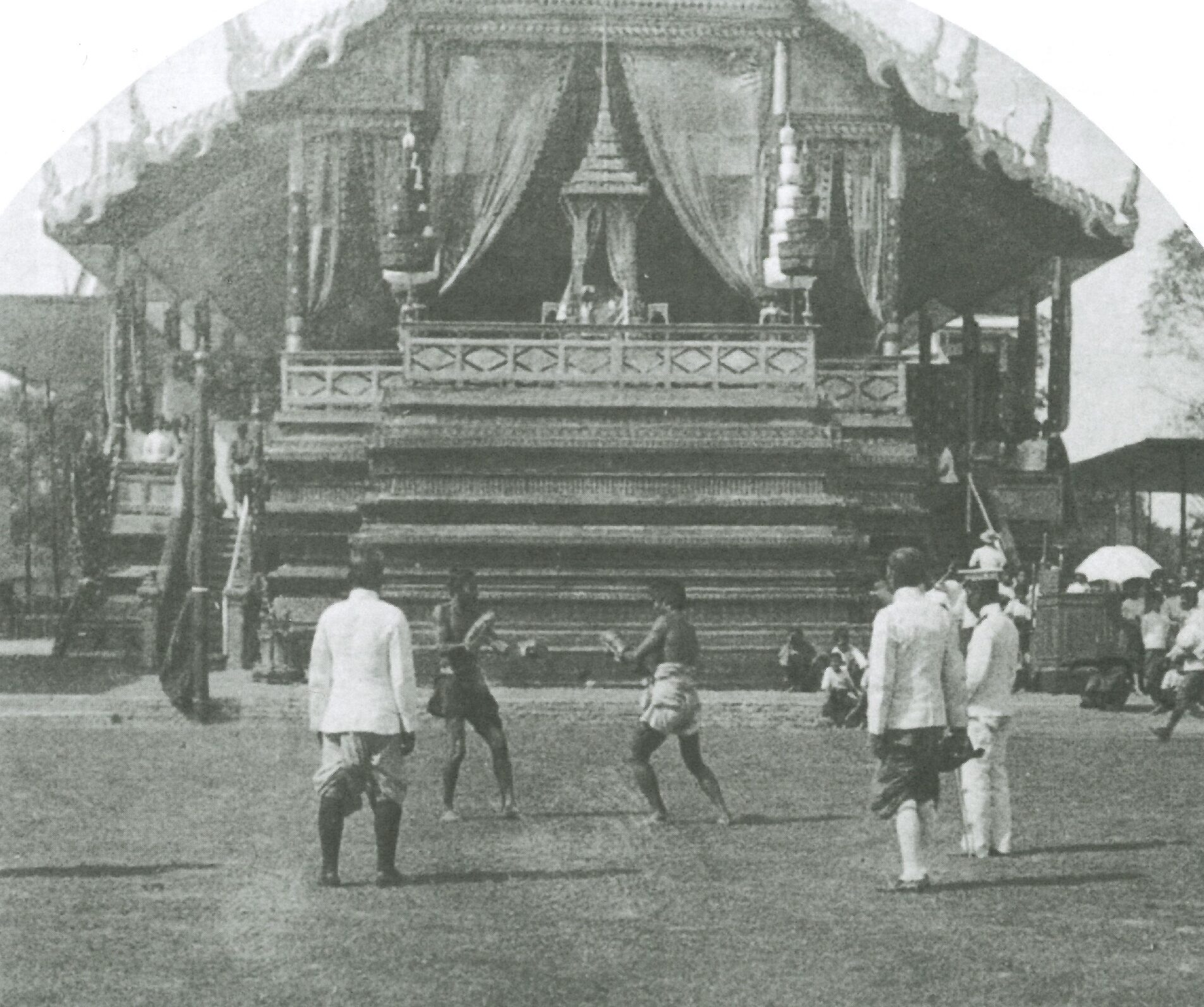
Muen Muay Mee Chue (Plong Jamnongthong) of Chaiya performed Muay Boran in front of the Sanphet Maha Prasat Throne Hall in 1907 during the reign of King Chulalongkorn.

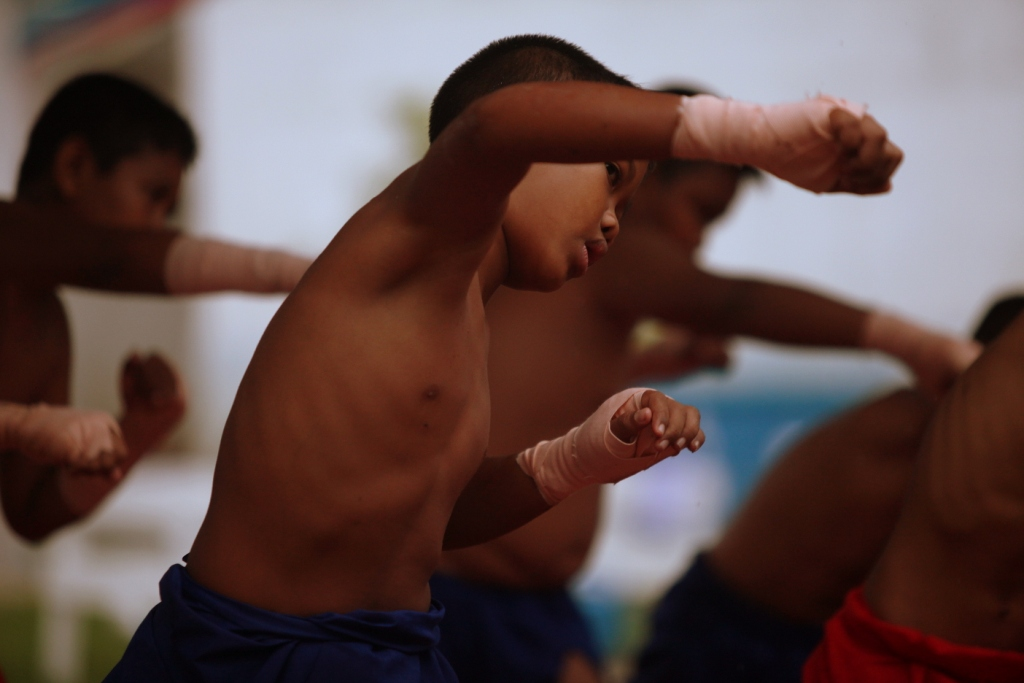
Local school children in Thailand demonstrate Muay Thai.

Modern Muay Thai arose from the local form of bare-hand fighting historically known simply as muay, and became recognized as a distinct martial art form in the early 20th century, when the term Muay Thai ('Siamese boxing' in English) was introduced in physical education curricular documents to distinguish it from international boxing (muay sakon in Thai).

The officially recognized history of Muay Thai was largely codified in the late 20th century, when the sport gained widespread popularity and became recognized as a national sport and cultural heritage. The term Muay Boran was coined to describe the pre-modern historical martial art form of Muay Thai, and they came to symbolize a warrior spirit seen as a core component of Thainess.

In 1910, the King requested muay fighters from outlying provinces to fight matches at the funeral of his son Prince Urubongse Rajasombhoj, and granted the noble rank of Muen to the three best fighters, who were from Lopburi, Khorat and Chaiya. These would later become codified as regional styles of Muay Boran.

1913: British boxing was introduced into the curriculum of the Suan Kulap College. The first descriptive use of the term "Muay Thai".

From 1914 to 1918 during World War I, Thailand sent troops to fight with its allies in France. They taught people there Muay Thai, and later Thai boxing spread to others and became known internationally, so the word of Muay Thai had reached Europe by this time. A French magazine, Le Sport Orient, published in Mainz, observed:

Thai boxing is astounding but hard to get to see. The boxers are agile, strong, and tough. This sport is not just a thrilling, strange, and extraordinary form of entertainment. Once again, it makes the French feel that Siam is one of the truly remarkable nations of Asia.

1919: British boxing and Muay Thai were taught as one sport in the curriculum of the Suan Kulap College. Judo was also offered.

1921: First permanent ring in Siam at Suan Kulap College. Used for both muay and British boxing.

1923: Suan Sanuk Stadium. First international style three-rope ring with red and blue padded corners, near Lumpinee Park. Muay and British boxing.

King Rama VII (r. 1925–1935) pushed for codified rules for Muay and they were put into place. Thailand's first boxing ring was built in 1921 at Suan Kulap. Referees were introduced and rounds were now timed by kick. Fighters at the Lumpinee Boxing Stadium began wearing modern gloves, as well as hard groin protectors, during training and in boxing matches against foreigners. Traditional rope-binding (Khat Chueak) made the hands a hardened, dangerous striking tool. The use of knots in the rope over the knuckles made the strikes more abrasive and damaging for the opponent while protecting the hands of the fighter. This rope-binding was still used in fights between Thais but after a death in the ring, it was decided that fighters should wear gloves and cotton coverlets over the feet and ankles. It was also around this time that the term "Muay Thai" became commonly used, while the older form of the style came to be known as "Muay Boran", which is now performed primarily as an exhibition art form.

On October 29, 1970. King Bhumibol Adulyadej gave his speech to the Muay Thai Fund Raising Organizing Committee in support of Thai boxers on behalf of the Anandamahidol Foundation states:

Muay Thai has also made its great progress. It is noteworthy that for Thailand, Thai boxing has its long history, and has been very popular and attractive to the Thai people. It seems that everybody supports Muay Thai and wants to see this sport progress further. Careful management based on technical approach, will certainly benefit this kind of sport. It is highly hoped that every individual person who is interested in this sport will take part in developing it to its higher efficiency so that it becomes the country's outstanding sport. Thailand's boxing has its several interesting points because it is our own Thai style of boxing, which is regarded as a high-efficiency fighting method, and it is interesting to foreigners, too. Thai boxing has had its close relationship with our national security and progress because Muay Thai is a way of self-defence. It is a sport originating from self-defence of those ancient Thai warriors. At present we need to protect ourselves by using fighting on the one hand, and by developing our country on the other. Boxers are well aware that if they fight with their force only, they are quite certain to lose. They need support of a good technical and academic approach as well as a firm mind ready to move ahead and to avoid undesirable effects. Therefore, the existence of Muay Thai for self-defence…

— The Royal statement of H.M. King Bhumibol Adulyadej The Great (Oct 29, 1970), Chitralada Palace

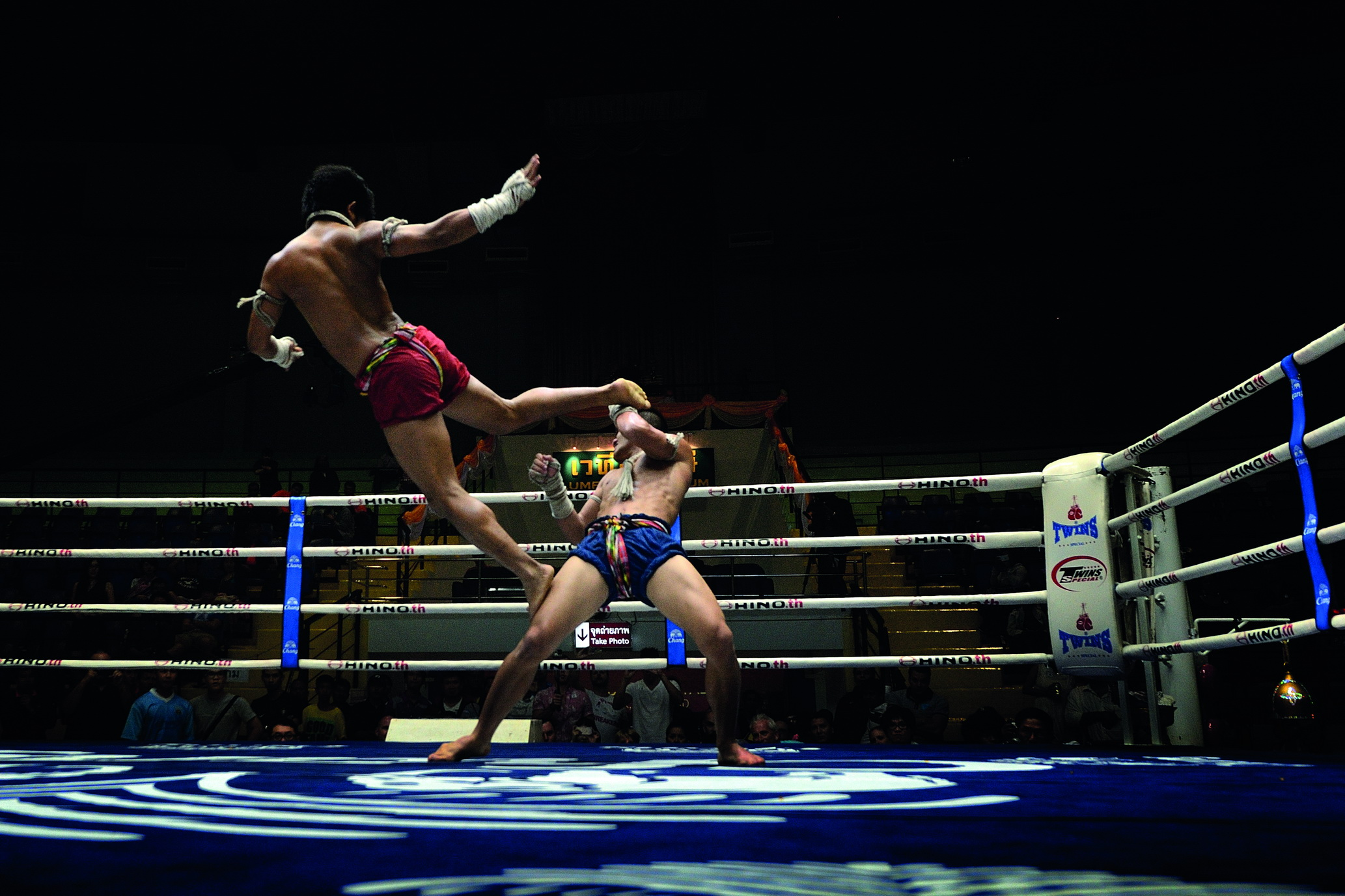
A Muay Boran demonstration, Lumpinee Boxing Stadium, Bangkok

Muay Thai was at the height of its popularity in the 1980s and 1990s. Top fighters commanded purses of up to 200,000 Baht and the stadia where gambling was legal drew big gates and big advertising revenues. In 2016, a payout to a superstar fighter was about 100,000 Baht per fight, but can range as high as 540,000 Baht for a bout.

In 1993, the International Federation of Muay Thai Amateur, or IFMA was inaugurated. It became the governing body of amateur Muay Thai consisting of 128 member countries worldwide and is recognised by the Olympic Council of Asia.

In 1995, the World Muaythai Council, the oldest and largest professional sanctioning organisations of muay Thai, was established by the Thai government and sanctioned by the Sports Authority of Thailand.

In 1995, the World Muay Thai Federation was founded by the merger of two existing organisations, and established in Bangkok, becoming the federation governing international Muay Thai. In August 2012, it had over 70 member countries. Its president is elected at the World Muay Thai Congress.

=== 21st century ===
In 2006, Muay Thai was included in SportAccord with IFMA. One of the requirements of SportAccord was that no sport can have a name of a country in its name. As a result, an amendment was made in the IFMA constitution to change the name of the sport from "Muay Thai" to "Muaythai" – written as one word in accordance with Olympic requirements.

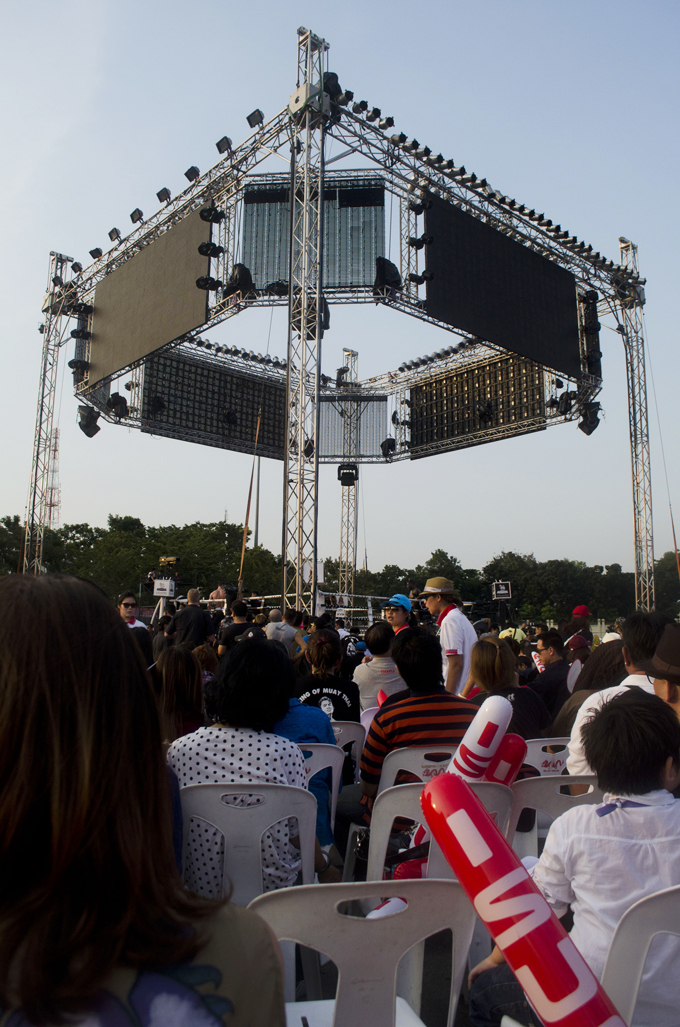
Thai Fight in 2012

In 2014, Muay Thai was included in the International World Games Association (IWGA) and was represented in the official programme of The World Games 2017 in Wrocław, Poland.

In January 2015, Muay Thai was granted the patronage of the International University Sports Federation (FISU) and, from 16 to 23 March 2015, the first University World Muaythai Cup was held in Bangkok.

In 2020, there are more than 3,800 Thai boxing gyms overseas.

=== Rules ===
According to IFMA rules, Muay Thai is a full-contact martial art that uses the fists, elbows, knees, and feet to strike an opponent. For a strike to count as a point score, it must connect without being blocked by the opponent. Strikes do not score if they connect with your opponent's glove, forearm, shin or foot. Strikes to the groin were permitted in Muay Thai boxing until the late 1980s, and are still permitted in Thailand itself, and in club or competition events that abide to the traditional rules. While competitors do wear groin protection, such as cups, the rules for club level sparring and competition events may vary regarding the protective gear that may or may not be worn. Mixed-sex fights are not practiced at the international level, but do occur in club and inter-club sparring and competition events. If the fight goes the distance and both fighters finish with the same score, then the winner is determined by which fighter landed the greatest number of full-contact blows.

=== Olympics ===
Timeline of International Federation of Muaythai Associations (IFMA) from founding to International Olympic Committee (IOC) recognition:

- 1992: National Federation of Muaythai Associations founded.
- 1995: International Amateur Muay Thai Federation (IAMTF) founded.
- 2012: Official request for International Olympic Committee (IOC) recognition launched.
- 2016: First endorsement received.
- 2017: Muaythai is included in the World Games.
- 2021: On June 10, the IOC Board of Directors agreed on the full endorsement of IFMA at the 138th IOC General Assembly in Tokyo.
- 2021: On July 20, the IOC General Assembly granted full recognition to the International Federation of Muaythai Associations (IFMA) and Muaythai.
- 2023: On January 11, USA MuayThai has been officially approved by The United States Olympic and Paralympic Committee (USOPC) and was recognized by the organization's committee as the newest member with a chance to build on the 2028 Olympic in the United States.
- 2023: The European Olympic Committees (EOC) had officially announced the inclusion of Muay Thai, or Thai-style boxing, at the 2023 European Games to be held in Krakow, Poland.
- 2024: The International Federation of Muay Thai Associations (IFMA) granted Muay Thai to feature as a demonstration sport to be held in the Olympic Games Paris 2024.

== Traditional wear ==
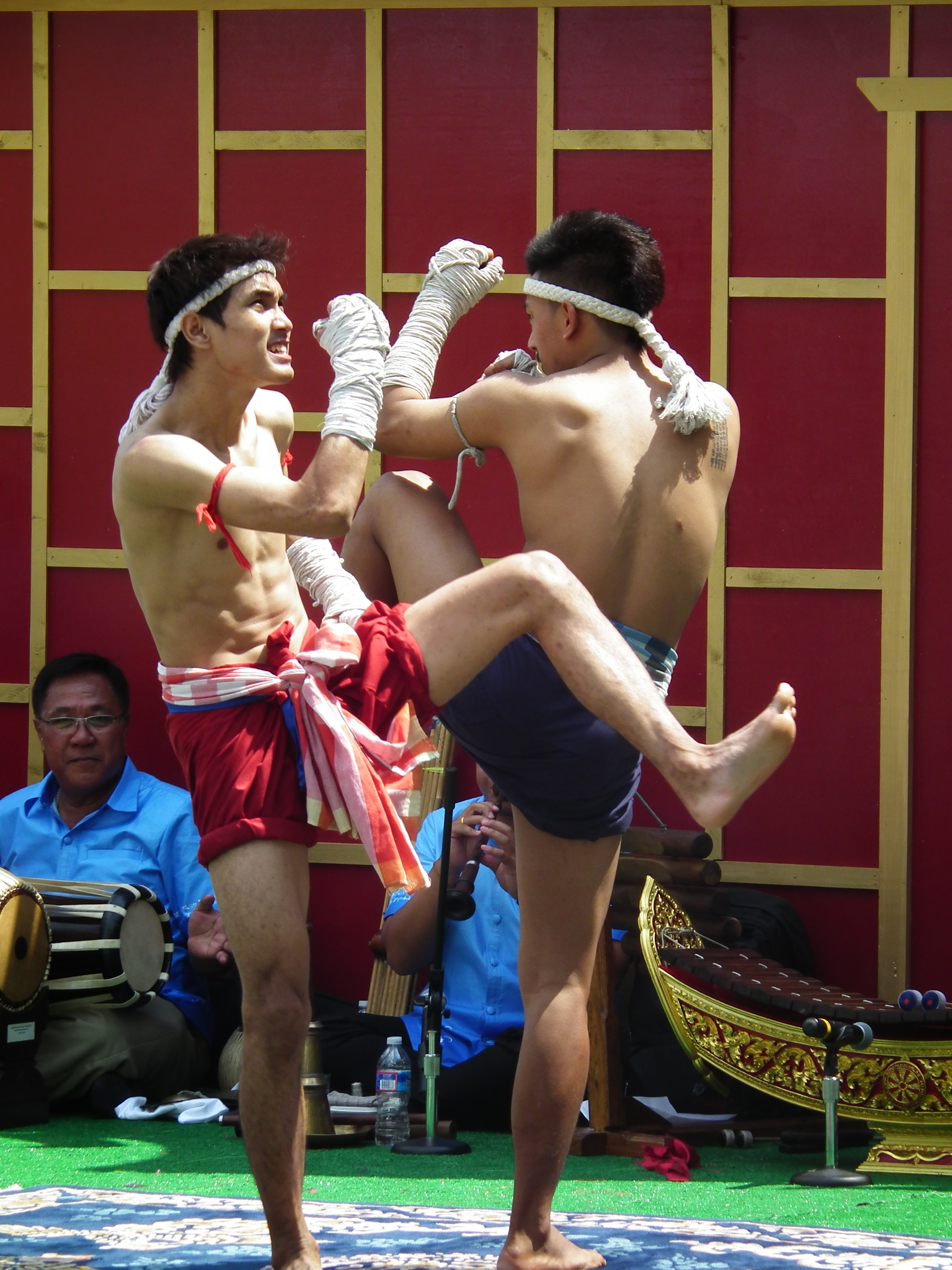
Fighters wearing mongkhon and pra jiad

The mongkhon, or mongkol (headband), and pra jiad (armbands) are often worn into the ring before the match begins. They originated when Siam was in a constant state of war. Young men would tear off pieces of a loved one's clothing (often a mother's sarong) and wear it in battle for good luck as well as to ward off harmful spirits. In modern times, the mongkol (lit. "holy spirit", "luck", "protection") is worn as a tribute to the fighter's gym. The mongkol is traditionally presented by a trainer to the fighter when he judges that the fighter is ready to represent the gym in the ring. Often, after the fighter has finished the wai kru, the trainer will take the mongkol off his head and place it in his corner of the ring for luck. They were also used for protection. Whether the fighter is a Buddhist or not, it is common for them to bring the mongkol to a Buddhist monk who blesses it for good luck prior to stepping into the ring.

Some schools, especially in the west, have different colored pra jiad to indicate rank, akin to other eastern martial arts. This practice is very common in Brazilian schools, introduced by the famed Chute Boxe Academy.

== Techniques ==
Formal Muay Thai techniques are divided into two groups: mae mai (แม่ไม้), or "major techniques", and luk mai (ลูกไม้), or "minor techniques". Muay Thai is often a fighting art of attrition, where opponents exchange blows with one another. This is certainly the case with traditional stylists in Thailand, but is a less popular form of fighting in the contemporary world fighting circuit where the Thai style of exchanging blow for blow is no longer favorable. Almost all techniques in Muay Thai use the entire body movement, rotating the hip with each kick, punch, elbow and block.

=== Punching (Muay Mat) ===
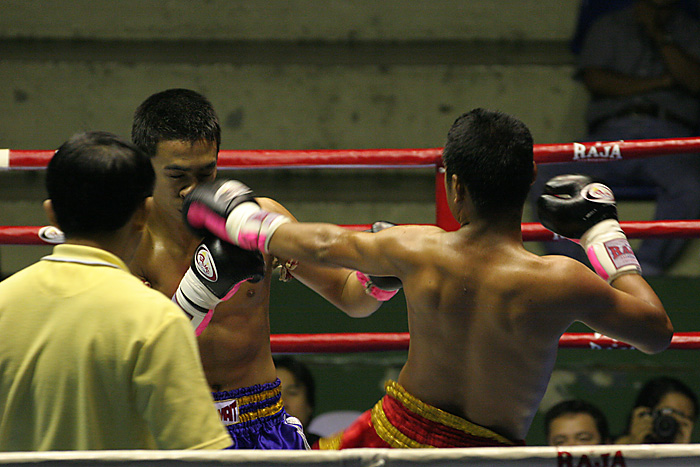
Muay Thai match, Bangkok

English	Thai	Romanization	IPA
Jab	หมัดหน้า/หมัดแย็บ	Mat na/Mat yaep	[màt nâ]
Cross/straight	หมัดตรง	Mat trong	[màt troŋ]
Hook/swing	หมัดเหวี่ยงสั้น	Mat tawad/mat wiang san	[màt wìəŋ sân]
Overhand/haymaker	หมัดเหวี่ยงยาว	Mat khork/mat wiang yao	[màt wìəŋ jaːw]
Backfist/spinning backfist	หมัดเหวี่ยงกลับ	Mat wiang klap/Mat clap lang/Kwang jag narai	[màt wìəŋ klàp]
Uppercut	หมัดเสย/หมัดสอยดาว	Mat soei/Mat ngat	[màt sɤ̌j], [màt sɔ̌j daːw]
Superman punch/cobra punch	กระโดดชก	Kradot chok	[kradòːt tɕʰók]

The punch techniques in Muay Thai were originally quite limited, being crosses and a long (or lazy) circular strike made with a straight (but not locked) arm and landing with the heel of the palm. Cross-fertilisation with Western boxing and Western martial arts mean the full range of western boxing punches are now used: lead jab, straight/cross, hook, uppercut, shovel and corkscrew punches and overhands, as well as hammer fists and back fists.

As a tactic, body punching is used less in Muay Thai than most other striking combat sports to avoid exposing the attacker's head to counter strikes from knees or elbows. To utilize the range of targeting points, in keeping with the centre line theory, the fighter can use either the Western or Thai stance which allows for either long range or short range attacks to be undertaken effectively without compromising guard.

=== Elbow (sok) ===
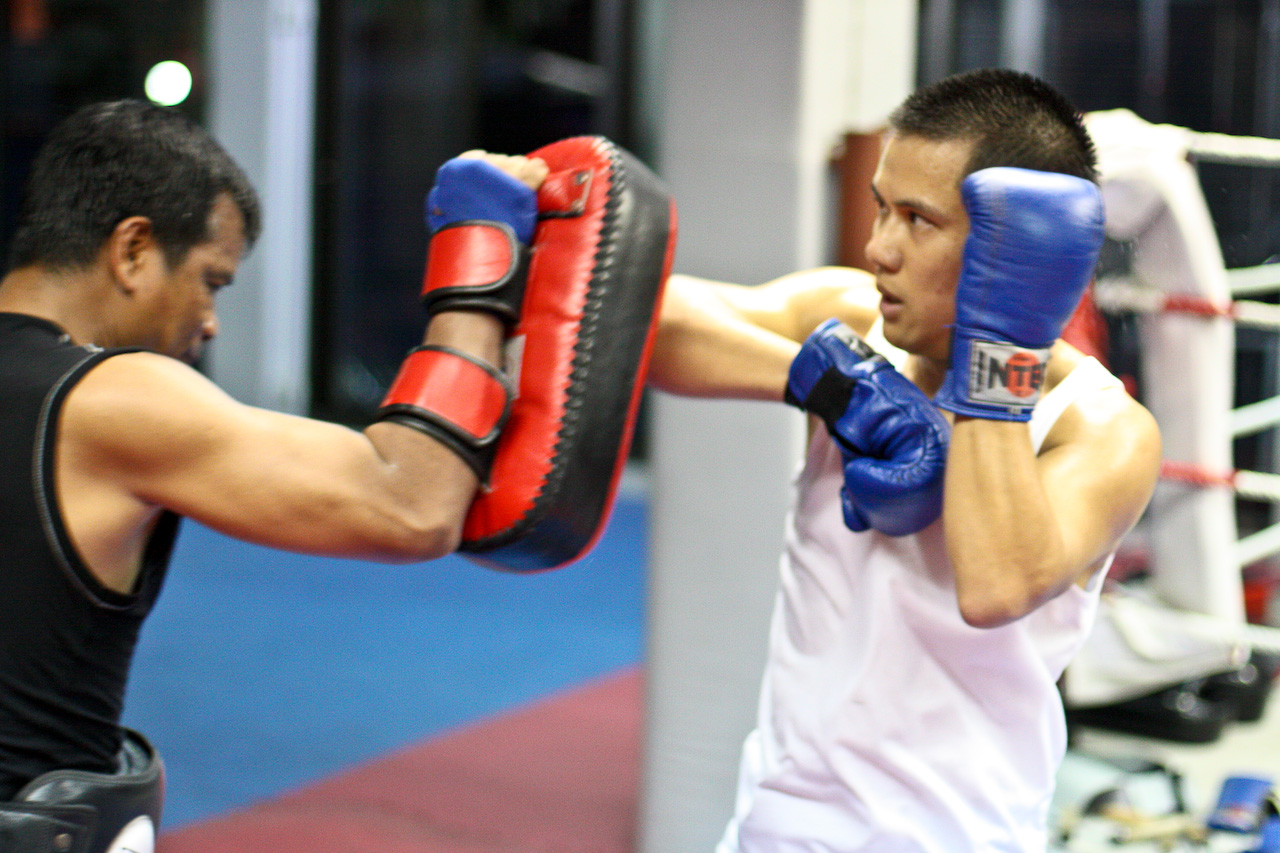
Elbow (sok) training

The elbow can be used in several ways as a striking weapon: horizontal, diagonal-upwards, diagonal-downwards, uppercut, downward, backward-spinning, and flying. From the side, it can be used as either a finishing move or as a way to cut the opponent's eyebrow so that blood might block his vision. The diagonal elbows are faster than the other forms but are less powerful. The elbow strike is considered the most dangerous form of attack in the sport.

English	Thai	Romanization	IPA
Elbow slash	ศอกตี (ศอกสับ)	Sok ti	[sɔ̀ːk tiː]
Horizontal elbow	ศอกตัด	Sok tat	[sɔ̀ːk tàt]
Uppercut elbow	ศอกงัด	Sok ngat	[sɔ̀ːk ŋát]
Forward elbow thrust	ศอกพุ่ง	Sok phung	[sɔ̀ːk pʰûŋ]
Reverse horizontal elbow	ศอกเหวี่ยงกลับ (ศอกกระทุ้ง)	Sok wiang klap	[sɔ̀ːk wìəŋ klàp]
Spinning elbow	ศอกกลับ	Sok klap	[sɔ̀ːk klàp]
Double elbow chop	ศอกกลับคู่	Sok klap khu	[sɔ̀ːk klàp kʰûː]
Mid-air elbow strike/jump elbow chop	กระโดดศอก	Kradot sok	[kradòːt sɔ̀ːk]

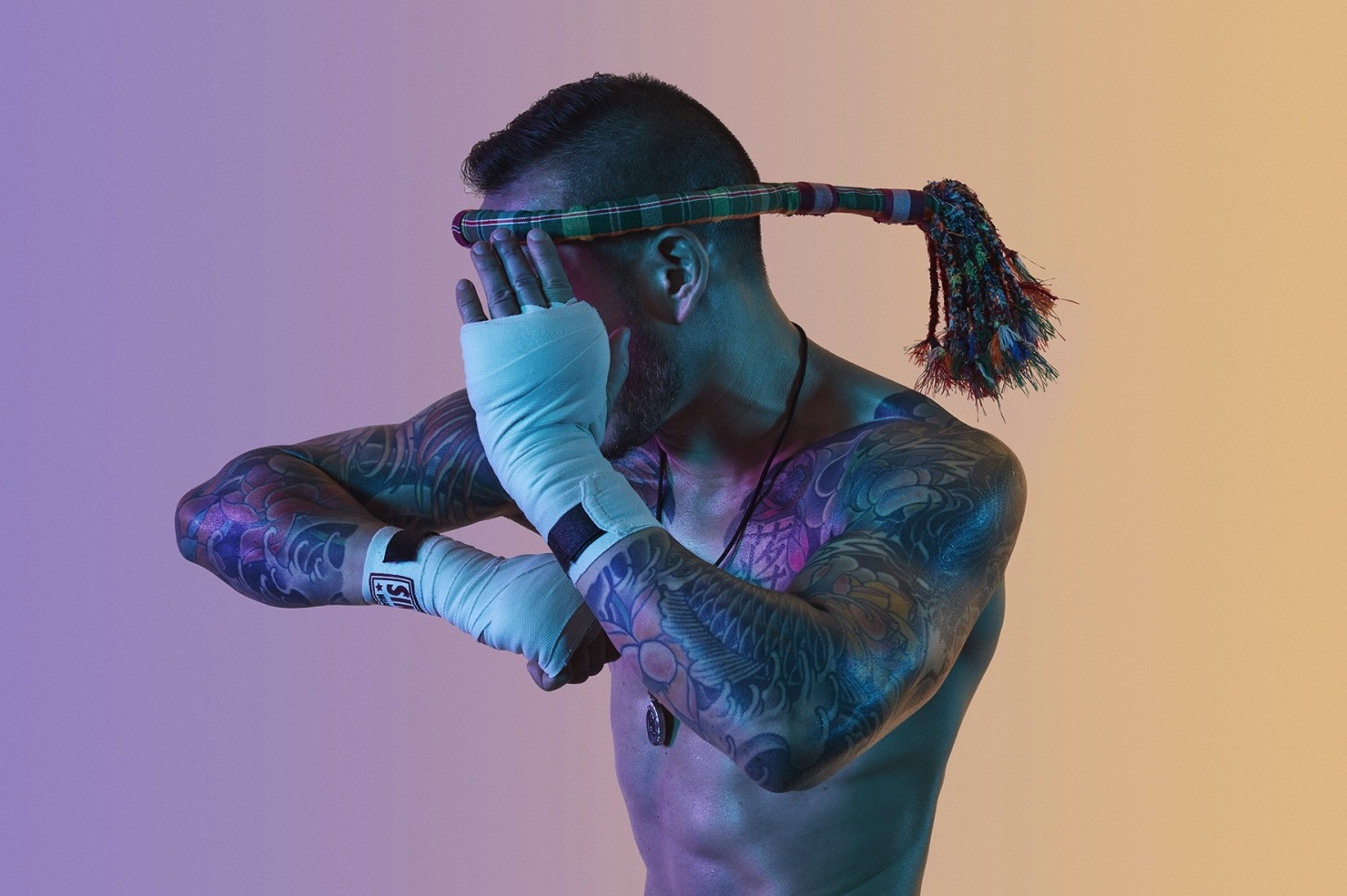
Horizontal elbow (sok tat)

There is a distinct difference between a single elbow and a follow-up elbow. The single elbow is a move independent from any other, whereas a follow-up elbow is the second strike from the same arm, being a hook or straight punch first with an elbow follow-up. Such elbows, and most other elbow strikes, are used when the distance between fighters becomes too small and there is too little space to throw a hook at the opponent's head.

Elbows can be used to great effect as blocks or defences against, for example, spring knees, side body knees, body kicks or punches. When well connected, an elbow strike can cause serious damage to the opponent, including cuts or even a knockout.

=== Kicking (te) ===
English	Thai	Romanization	IPA
Straight kick	เตะตรง	Te trong	[tèʔ troŋ]
Roundhouse kick	เตะตัด	Te tat	[tèʔ tàt]
Diagonal kick	เตะเฉียง	Te chiang	[tèʔ tɕʰǐəŋ]
Half-shin, half-knee kick	เตะครึ่งแข้งครึ่งเข่า	Te khrueng khaeng khrueng khao	[tèʔ kʰrɯ̂ŋ kʰɛ̂ŋ kʰrɯ̂ŋ kʰàw]
Reverse roundhouse kick	เตะกลับหลัง	Te klap lang/Jorakhe faad hang	[tèʔ klàp lǎŋ]
Down roundhouse kick	เตะกด	Te kot	[tèʔ kòt]
Axe heel kick	เตะเข่า	Te khao	[tèʔ kʰàw]
Jump kick	กระโดดเตะ	Kradot te	[kradòːt tèʔ]
Step-up kick	เขยิบเตะ	Khayoep te/yiep te	[kʰa.jɤ̀p tèʔ]

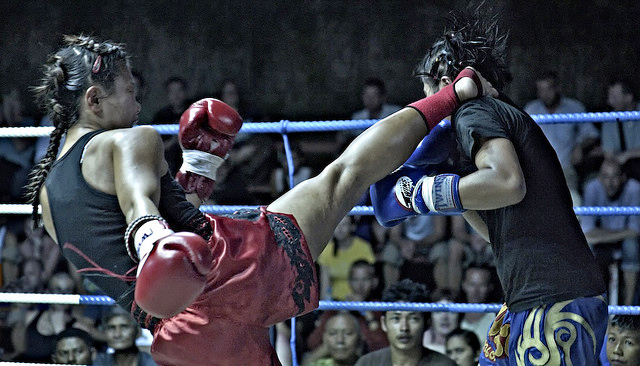
Kicking (te)

The two most common kicks in Muay Thai are known as the thip (literally "foot jab") and the te chiang (kicking upwards in the shape of a triangle cutting under the arm and ribs), or roundhouse kick. The Thai roundhouse kick uses a rotational movement of the entire body and has been widely adopted by practitioners of other combat sports. It is done from a circular stance with the back leg just a little ways back (roughly shoulder width apart) in comparison to instinctive upper body fighting (boxing) where the legs must create a wider base. The roundhouse kick draws its power almost entirely from the rotational movement of the hips, counter-rotation of the shoulders and arms are also often used to add torque to the lower body and increase the power of the kick as well.

If a roundhouse kick is attempted by the opponent, the Thai boxer will normally check the kick, that is, he will block the kick with the outside of his lower leg. Thai boxers are trained to always connect with the shin. The foot contains many fine bones and is much weaker. A fighter may end up hurting himself if he tries to strike with his foot or instep. Shins are trained by repeatedly striking firm objects, such as pads or heavy bags.

=== Knee (ti khao) ===
English	Thai	Romanization	IPA
Straight knee strike	เข่าตรง	Khao trong	[kʰàw troŋ]
Diagonal knee strike	เข่าเฉียง	Khao chiang	[kʰàw tɕʰǐəŋ]
Curving knee strike	เข่าโค้ง	Khao khong	[kʰàw kʰóːŋ]
Horizontal knee strike	เข่าตัด	Khao tat	[kʰàw tàt]
Knee slap	เข่าตบ	Khao ti/khao top	[kʰàw tòp]
Knee bomb	เข่ายาว	Khao yao	[kʰàw jaːw]
Flying knee	เข่าลอย	Khao loi	[kʰàw lɔːj]
Step-up knee strike	เข่าเหยียบ	Khao yiap	[kʰàw jìəp]

- Khao dot [kʰàw dòːt] (Jumping knee strike) – the boxer jumps up on one leg and strikes with that leg's knee.
- Khao loi (flying knee strike) – the boxer takes a step(s), jumps forward and off one leg and strikes with that leg's knee.
- Khao thon [kʰàw tʰoːn] (Straight knee strike) – the boxer simply thrusts it forward but not upwards, unless he is holding an opponent's head down in a clinch and intend to knee upwards into the face. According to one written source, this technique is somewhat more recent than khao dot or khao loi. Supposedly, when the Thai boxers fought with rope-bound hands rather than the modern boxing gloves, this particular technique was subject to potentially vicious cutting, slicing and sawing by an alert opponent who would block it or deflect it with the sharp "rope-glove" edges which are sometimes dipped in water to make the rope much stronger. This explanation also holds true for some of the following knee strikes below as well.

=== Foot-thrust (teep) ===
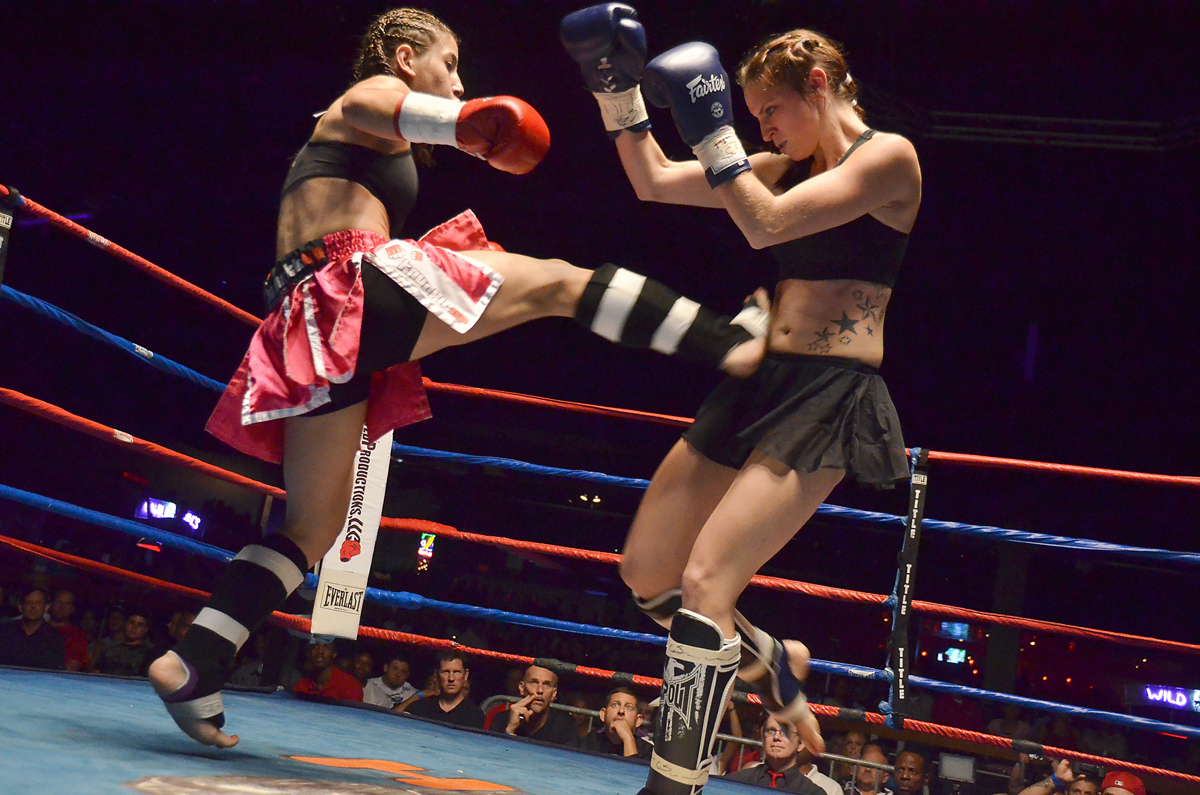
One fighter executes a Muay Thai foot-thrust (thip) kick against her opponent in a women's amateur muay Thai match.

The foot-thrust, or literally, "foot jab", is one of the techniques in Muay Thai. It is mainly used as a defensive technique to control distance or block attacks. Foot-thrusts should be thrown quickly but with enough force to knock an opponent off balance.

English	Thai	Romanization	IPA
Straight foot-thrust	ถีบตรง	Thip trong	[tʰìːp troŋ]
Sideways foot-thrust	ถีบข้าง	Thip khang	[tʰìːp kʰâːŋ]
Reverse foot-thrust	ถีบกลับหลัง	Thip klap lang	[tʰìːp klàp lǎŋ]
Slapping foot-thrust	ถีบตบ	Thip top	[tʰìːp tòp]
Jumping foot-thrust	กระโดดถีบ	Kradot thip	[kradòːt tʰìːp]

=== Clinch and neck wrestling (chap kho) ===
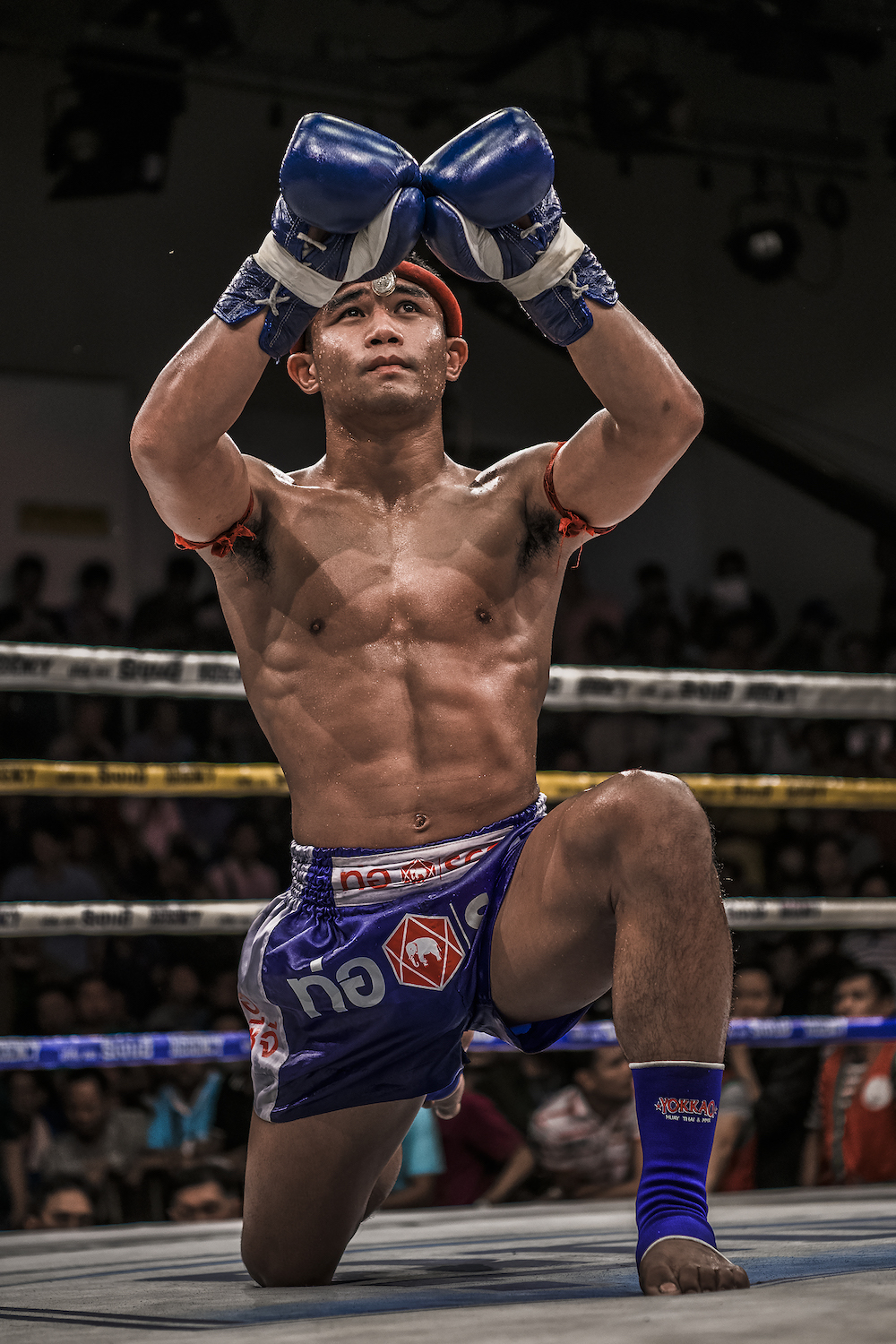
Ram Muay, rituals before the match

In Western boxing, the two fighters are separated when they clinch; in muay Thai, however, they are not. It is often in the clinch that knee and elbow techniques are used. To strike and bind the opponent for both offensive and defensive purposes, small amounts of stand-up grappling are used in the clinch. The front clinch should be performed with the palm of one hand on the back of the other. There are three reasons why the fingers must not be intertwined. 1) In the ring fighters are wearing boxing gloves and cannot intertwine their fingers. 2) The Thai front clinch involves pressing the head of the opponent downwards, which is easier if the hands are locked behind the back of the head instead of behind the neck. Furthermore, the arms should be putting as much pressure on the neck as possible. 3) A fighter may incur an injury to one or more fingers if they are intertwined, and it becomes more difficult to release the grip in order to quickly elbow the opponent's head.

A correct clinch also involves the fighter's forearms pressing against the opponent's collar bone while the hands are around the opponent's head rather than the opponent's neck. The general way to get out of a clinch is to push the opponent's head backward or elbow them, as the clinch requires both participants to be very close to one another. Additionally, the non-dominant clincher can try to "swim" their arm underneath and inside the opponent's clinch, establishing the previously non-dominant clincher as the dominant clincher.

Muay Thai has several other variants of the clinch or chap kho [tɕàp kʰɔː], including:

- Arm clinch: One or both hands controls the inside of the defender's arm(s) and where the second hand if free is in the front clinch position. This clinch is used to briefly control the opponent before applying a knee strike or throw.
- Side clinch: One arm passes around the front of the defender with the attacker's shoulder pressed into the defender's arm pit and the other arm passing round the back which allows the attacker to apply knee strikes to the defender's back or to throw the defender readily.
- Low clinch: Both controlling arms pass under the defender's arms, which is generally used by the shorter of two opponents.
- Swan-neck: One hand around the rear of the neck is used to briefly clinch an opponent before a strike.

=== Defence against attacks ===
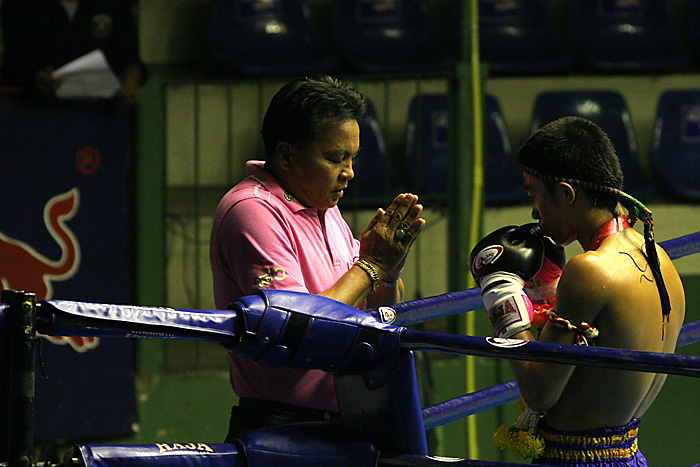
Praying before the match

Defences in muay Thai are categorised in six groups:

- Blocking – defender's hard blocks to stop a strike in its path so preventing it reaching its target (e.g., the shin block described in more detail below)
- Parry/block – Parrying or blocking uses the kickboxer's hands as defensive tools to deflect incoming attacks. As the opponent's punch arrives, the boxer delivers a sharp, lateral, open-handed blow to the opponent's wrist or forearm, redirecting the punch.
- Avoidance – moving a body part out of the way or range of a strike so the defender remains in range for a counter-strike. For example, the defender moves their front leg backward to avoid the attacker's low kick, then immediately counters with a roundhouse kick. Or the defender might lay their head back from the attacker's high roundhouse kick then counter-attack with a side kick.
- Evasion – moving the body out of the way or range of a strike so the defender has to move close again to counter-attack, e.g. defender jumping laterally or back from attacker's kicks
- Disruption – Pre-empting an attack e.g. with defender using disruptive techniques like jab, foot-thrust or low roundhouse kick, generally called a "leg kick" (to the outside or inside of the attacker's front leg, just above the knee) as the attacker attempts to close distance
- Anticipation – Defender catching a strike (e.g., catching a roundhouse kick to the body) or countering it before it lands (e.g., defender's low kick to the supporting leg below as the attacker initiates a high roundhouse kick).

==== Defences in practice ====
Defensively, the concept of "wall of defence" is used, in which shoulders, arms and legs are used to hinder the attacker from successfully executing techniques. Blocking is a critical element in muay Thai and compounds the level of conditioning a successful practitioner must possess. Low and mid body roundhouse kicks are normally blocked with the upper portion of a raised shin (this block is known as a "check"). High body strikes are blocked ideally with the forearms and shoulder together, or if enough time is allowed for a parry, the glove (elusively), elbow, or shin will be used. Midsection roundhouse kicks can also be caught/trapped, allowing for a sweep or counter-attack to the remaining leg of the opponent. Punches are blocked with an ordinary boxing guard and techniques similar, if not identical, to basic boxing technique. A common means of blocking a punch is using the hand on the same side as the oncoming punch. For example, if an orthodox fighter throws a jab (being the left hand), the defender will make a slight tap to redirect the punch's angle with the right hand. The deflection is always as small and precise as possible to avoid unnecessary energy expenditure and return the hand to the guard as quickly as possible. Hooks are often blocked with a motion sometimes described as "combing the hair", that is, raising the elbow forward and effectively shielding the head with the forearm, flexed biceps and shoulder. More advanced muay Thai blocks are usually in the form of counter-strikes, using the opponent's weight (as they strike) to amplify the damage that the countering opponent can deliver. This requires impeccable timing and thus can generally only be learned by many repetitions.

== Child boxers ==
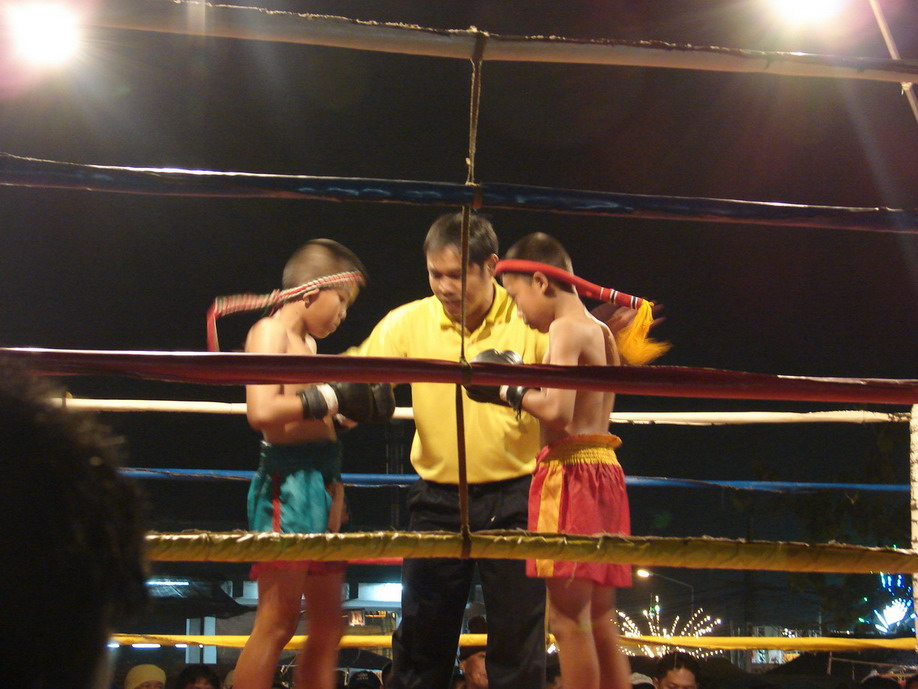
In Thailand, children often start practicing Muay Thai and perform in the ring from the age of 5.

In 2016, 9,998 children under the age of 15 were registered with Board of Boxing under the Sport Authority of Thailand, according to the Child Safety Promotion and Injury Prevention Research Centre (CSIP). Some estimates put the number of child boxers nationwide at between 200,000 and 300,000, some as young as four years old.

The Advanced Diagnostic Imaging Centre (AIMC) at Ramathibodi Hospital studied 300 child boxers aged under 15 with two to more than five years of experience, as well as 200 children who do not box. The findings show that child boxers not only sustain brain injuries, they also have a lower IQ, about 10 points lower than average levels. Moreover, IQ levels correlate with the length of their training. Beyond brain damage, the death of young fighters in the ring sometimes occurs.

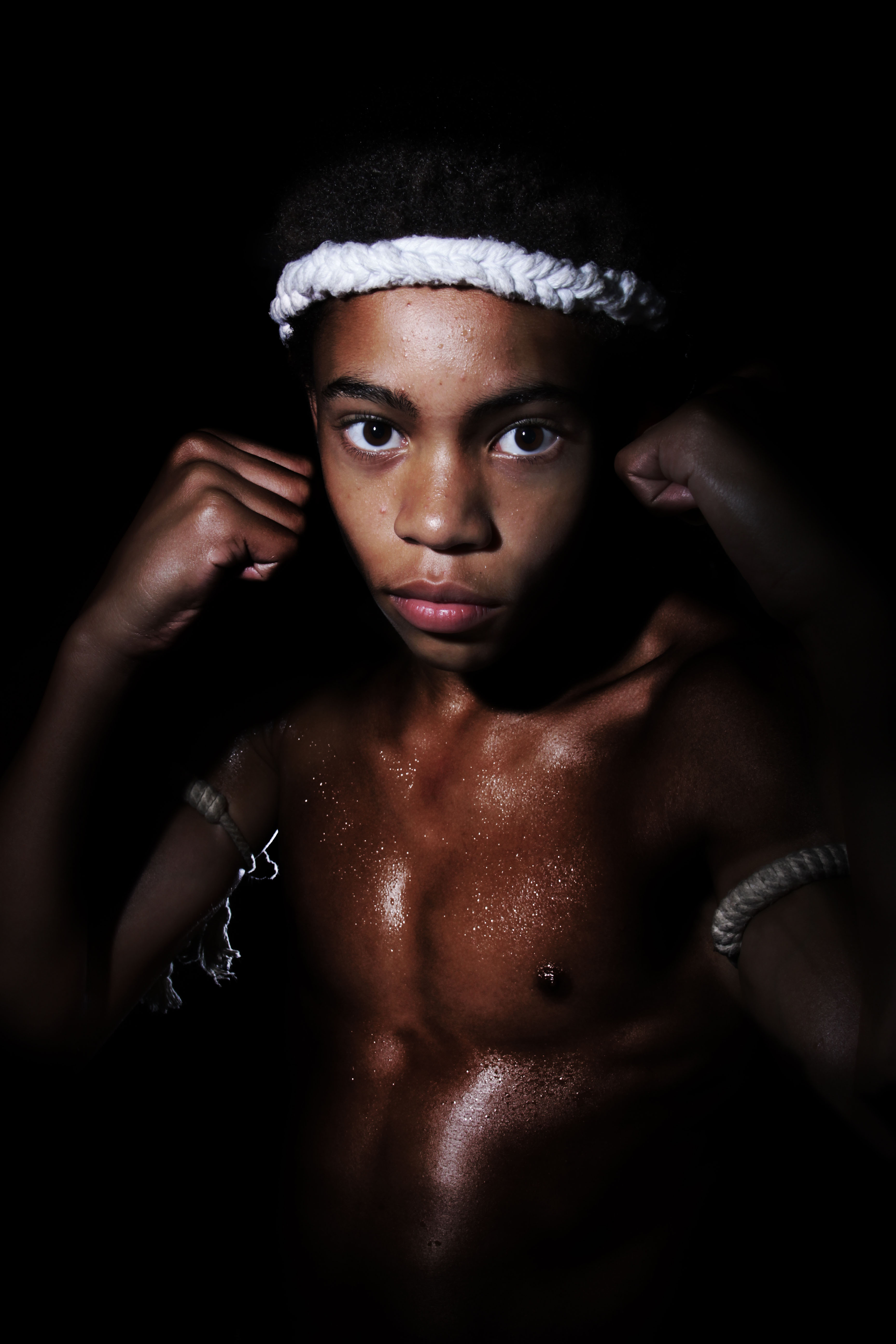
Child boxer

Adisak Plitapolkarnpim, director of CSIP, was indirectly quoted (in 2016) as having said that muay Thai practitioners "younger than 15 years old are being urged to avoid 'head contact' to reduce the risk of brain injuries, while children aged under nine should be banned from the combat fight"; furthermore, the Boxing Act's minimum age to compete professionally was largely being flouted; furthermore, quoted indirectly, "Boxers aged between 13 and 15" should still be permitted to compete, but "with light contact to the head and face". He said that "spectators and a change in the boxing rules can play a vital role in preventing child boxers from suffering brain injuries, abnormality in brain structure, Parkinson's disease and early-onset Alzheimer's later in life...Children aged between nine and 15 can take part in [Thai] boxing, but direct head contact must not be allowed". Referring to Findings [of 2014] on the Worst Forms of Child Labour as published by the US Department of Labor's Bureau of International Labor Affairs, he said, "We know Muay Thai paid fighters have been exploited in the past like child labourers and the matter still remains a serious concern."

At the 13th World Conference on Injury Prevention and Safety Promotion in 2018, it was revealed that up to three percent of the upcoming generation will grow up with learning disabilities unless an amendment is ratified that bans children under 12 from participating in boxing matches. International pediatricians have called on lawmakers in Thailand to help.

== Injuries ==
Muay Thai is a combat sport that utilises eight different parts of the body (fists, elbows, knees and shins) so injuries are quite common in all levels of muay Thai. An injury is considered reportable if it requires the athlete to rest for more than one day. Many injuries in the sport go unreported as the fighters may not notice the injuries at first, refuse to admit that they need treatment, have a heightened pain threshold, fear that their instructor will perceive the injury negatively, or have confusion as to what is an injury. Similar to most sports, injury rates tend to be higher in beginners than amateurs and professionals. Soft tissue injuries are the most common form of injury in muay Thai, comprising between 80 and 90% of all injuries. These injuries are caused by repeated trauma to soft parts of the body. During matches there is little to no padding, leaving soft tissue vulnerable to strikes. The second most common injuries among beginners and amateurs are sprains and strains. It appears that these injuries can be easily avoided or reduced. Many participants of a study admitted to inadequate warm up before the event of the injury. The third most common injuries are fractures. Fractures are more commonly seen with amateur and professional fighters, because they are allowed full contact, while beginners are not. The most common sites for fractures are the nose, carpal bones, metacarpals, digits and ribs. The distribution of injuries differs significantly for beginners, amateurs and professionals, because as a fighter progresses through the different levels, the forces involved grow progressively higher, less padding and protective equipment is used, and athletes are likely to train harder, resulting in more serious injuries among experienced fighters.

== Gambling ==
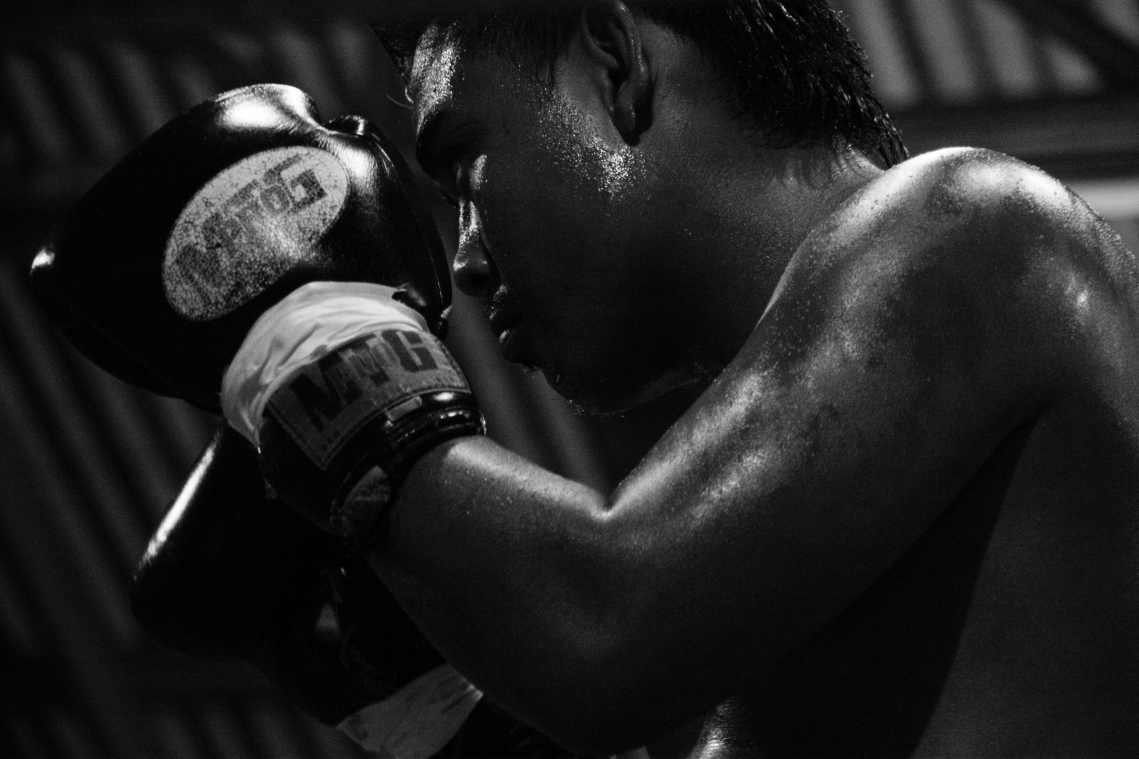
Thai boxer during a fight on Koh Samui

According to a Bangkok Post columnist, "...Thai professional boxing is all about gambling and big money. Gambling on muay Thai boxing is estimated to worth about 40 billion baht a year....all the talk about the promotion of Thai martial arts is just baloney." Rob Cox, the manager of a boxing camp just east of Bangkok claims that "Without the gamblers, the sport would pretty much be dead. They're killing it off, but they're also keeping it alive".

The practice of fixing fights is not unknown. Boxers can earn from 60,000 to 150,000 baht for purposefully losing a fight. A fighter, later arrested, who threw a fight at Rajadamnern Stadium in December 2019, is an example. An infamous alleged case of match-fixing was the bout on 12 October 2014 in Pattaya between top Thai boxer Buakaw Banchamek and his challenger, Enriko Kehl, at the K-1 World Max Final event.

== Conditioning ==
Like most full contact fighting sports, muay Thai has a heavy focus on body conditioning. This can create a steep learning curve for newcomers to muay Thai but allows for rapid increases in fitness and stamina provided one avoids overtraining. Training regimens include many staples of combat sport conditioning such as running, shadowboxing, rope jumping, body weight resistance exercises, medicine ball exercises, abdominal exercises and, in some cases, weight training. Thai boxers rely heavily on kicks utilising the shin bone. As such, practitioners will repeatedly hit a dense heavy bag with their shins, conditioning it, hardening the bone through a process called cortical remodelling.

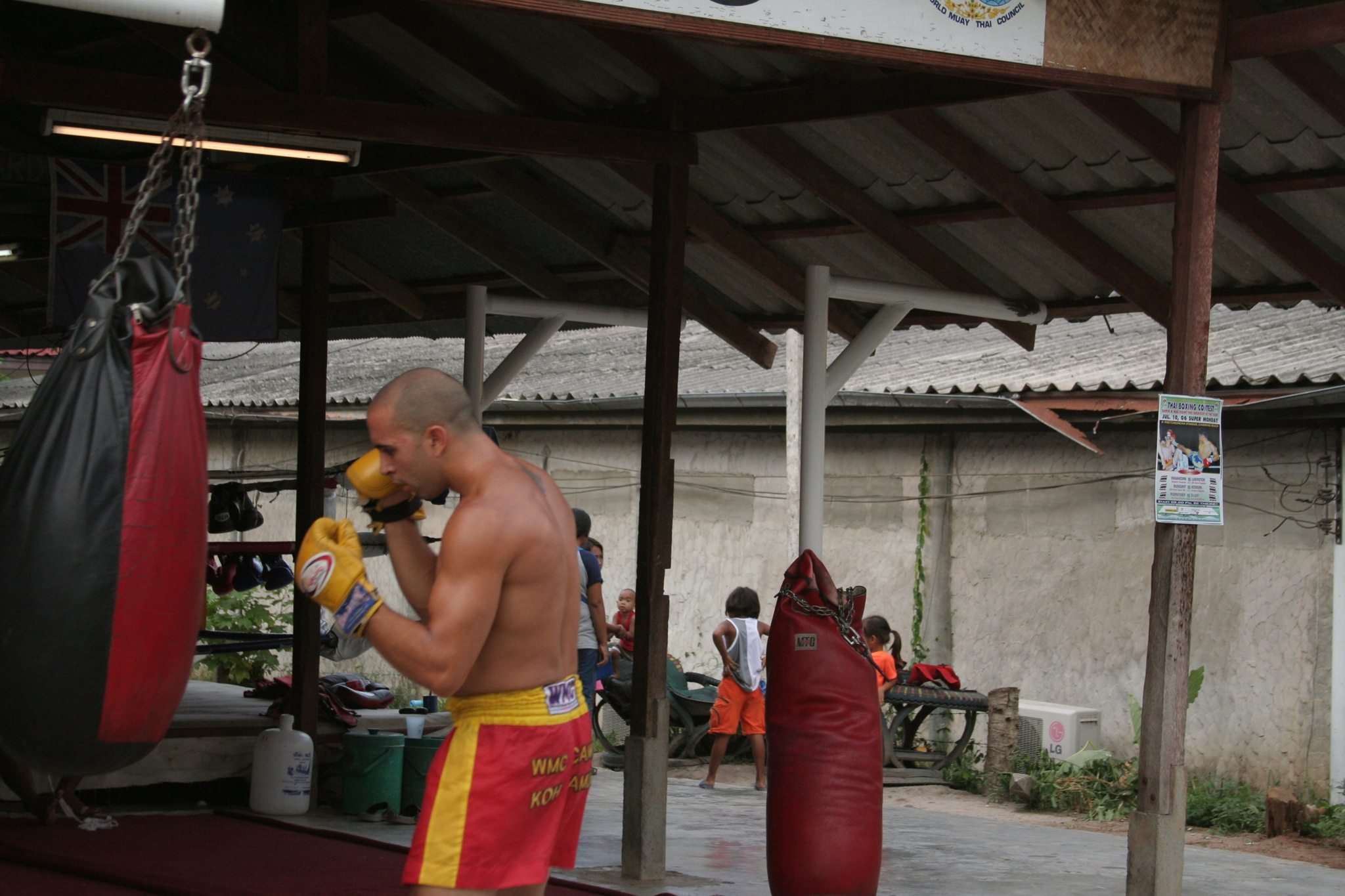
A fighter punching a heavy bag at a training camp in Thailand

Training specific to a Thai fighter includes training with coaches on Thai pads, focus mitts, heavy bag, and sparring. Daily training includes many rounds (3–5 minute periods broken up by a short rest, often 1–2 minutes) of these various methods of practice. Thai pad training is a cornerstone of muay Thai conditioning that involves practicing punches, kicks, knees, and elbow strikes with a trainer wearing thick pads covering the forearms and hands. These special pads (often referred to as Thai pads) are used to absorb the impact of the fighter's strikes and allow the fighter to react to the attacks of the pad holder in a live situation. The trainer will often also wear a belly pad around the abdominal area so that the fighter can attack with straight kicks or knees to the body at any time during the round.

Focus mitts are specific to training a fighter's hand speed, punch combinations, timing, punching power, defence and counter-punching and may also be used to practice elbow strikes. Heavy bag training is a conditioning and power exercise that reinforces the techniques practiced on the pads. Sparring is a means to test technique, skills, range, strategy and timing against a partner. Sparring is often a light to medium contact exercise because competitive fighters on a full schedule are not advised to risk injury by sparring hard. Specific tactics and strategies can be trained with sparring including in close fighting, clinching and kneeing only, cutting off the ring, or using reach and distance to keep an aggressive fighter away.

Due to the rigorous training regimen (some Thai boxers fight almost every other week), professional boxers in Thailand have relatively short careers in the ring. Many retire from competition to begin instructing the next generation of Thai fighters. Most professional Thai boxers come from lower economic backgrounds, and the purse (after other parties have their cut) is sought as a means of support for the fighters and their families. Very few higher economic strata Thais join the professional muay Thai ranks; they usually either do not practice the sport or practice it only as amateur boxers.

== Perspectives ==
Scholars have described this royalist-nationalist history as an invented tradition, constructed to serve the needs of Thai nationalism at the time. This tradition has caused Muay Thai to become strongly attached to the official Thai cultural institution and separated from other similar and closely related martial arts in the region, including muay Lao in Laos, and lethwei in Myanmar.

== See also ==
- Muay Lerdrit
- Dan Bonner (kickboxer)
- Muay Lao
