= Pra Jiad =

Type of armband worn by Muay Thai athletes

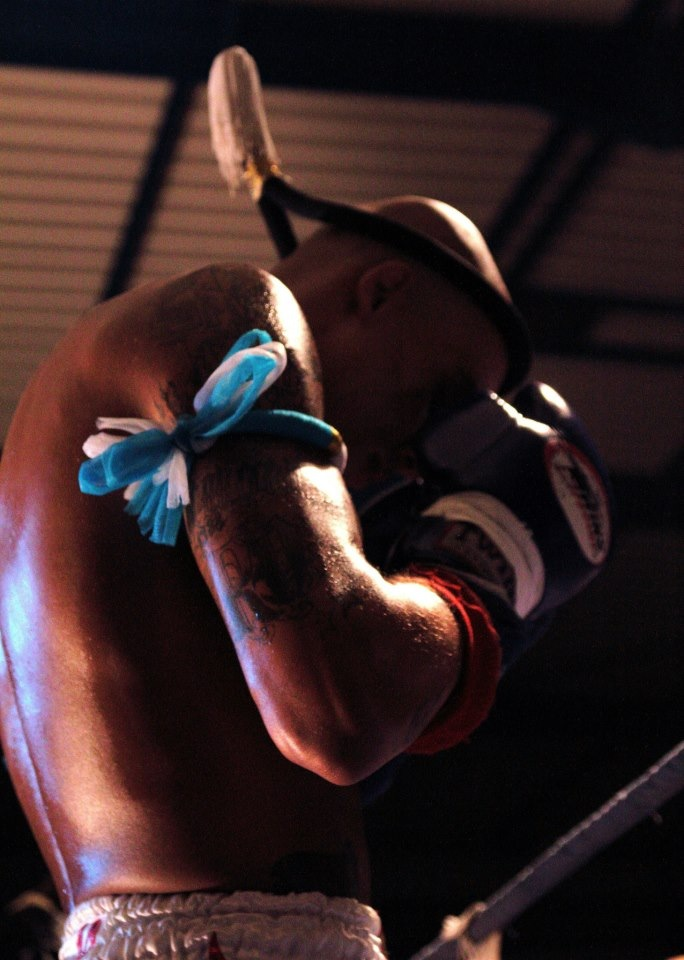
Pra Jiad

Pra Jiad (Thai: ประเจียด, RTGS: prachiat, pronounced [prā.t͡ɕìa̯t]) is a type of armband worn by Muay Thai athletes. In the past, their use was to give confidence and luck to the athletes, and was usually made by the fighter's close family member (mother, father, etc.). Some fighters wear one Pra Jiad, some wear two. Some schools also use color-coded Pra Jiads to show rank, similar to belts in other martial arts. Today, some gyms will give Pra Jiad to their athletes to boost their confidence. This practice is very common in Brazilian schools, introduced by the famed Chute Boxe Academy.

Traditionally, Pra Jiads were kept in high or well revered places, as it was thought that if someone stepped over it, or dropped it, it would lose its mystical power.

== Origins ==
The origin of the Pra Jiad has close association with warriors going into the battlefield. In the past, Thai warriors would be given a piece of their mother's clothing (usually a Sarong) before leaving their home for battles. They tied the pieces of clothing around their arms to bring them good luck in battle so that they would return home safely. Over time, this tradition evolved, incorporating intricate designs and colors that represent the fighter's lineage, skills, and personal beliefs.

== Practical functions ==
During a Muay Thai bout, the Pra Jiad helps to provide stability and support to the fighter's limbs, enhancing their performance and minimizing the risk of injury.
