= 2005 in Shooto =

Mixed martial arts events

Information
- First date: January 29, 2005
- Last date: December 17, 2005

Events
- Total events: 27

Fights
- Total fights: 177
- Title fights: 1

Chronology
2004 in Shooto	2005 in Shooto	2006 in Shooto

The year 2005 is the 17th year in the history of Shooto, a mixed martial arts promotion based in Japan. In 2005 Shooto held 27 events beginning with, Shooto: 1/29 in Korakuen Hall.

== Title fights ==
Title fights in 2005
Weight class				Method	Round	Time	Event	Notes
Featherweight	Alexandre Franca Nogueira (c)	def.	Joao Roque	Decision (Unanimous)	3	5:00	Shooto: 3/11 in Korakuen Hall	(Note: For the Featherweight Championship.)

== Events list ==
#	Event title	Date	Arena	Location
185	G-Shooto: G-Shooto 03	December 17, 2005	Shinjuku Face	Tokyo, Japan
184	Shooto: 12/17 in Shinjuku Face	December 17, 2005	Shinjuku Face	Tokyo, Japan
183	Shooto 2005: 11/29 in Kitazawa Town Hall	November 29, 2005	Kitazawa Town Hall	Setagaya, Tokyo, Japan
182	Shooto: Shooto & Kakumei Kickboxing	November 13, 2005	Osaka Prefectural Gymnasium	Osaka, Kansai, Japan
181	G-Shooto: Plus04	November 11, 2005	Shin-Kiba 1st Ring	Tokyo, Japan
180	Shooto 2005: 11/6 in Korakuen Hall	November 6, 2005	Korakuen Hall	Tokyo, Japan
179	Shooto: Soulful Fight	October 28, 2005	Kitazawa Town Hall	Setagaya, Tokyo, Japan
178	Shooto: 9/23 in Korakuen Hall	September 23, 2005	Korakuen Hall	Tokyo, Japan
177	G-Shooto: Plus03	September 16, 2005	Kitazawa Town Hall	Setagaya, Tokyo, Japan
176	Shooto: Alive Road	August 20, 2005	Yokohama Cultural Gymnasium	Yokohama, Kanagawa, Japan
175	Shooto 2005: 7/30 in Korakuen Hall	July 30, 2005	Korakuen Hall	Tokyo, Japan
174	Shooto: Shooter's Summer	July 14, 2005	Kitazawa Town Hall	Setagaya, Tokyo, Japan
173	G-Shooto: Plus02	July 12, 2005	Kitazawa Town Hall	Setagaya, Tokyo, Japan
172	Shooto: Gig Central 8	July 3, 2005	Nagoya Trade and Industry Center Fukiage Hall	Nagoya, Aichi, Japan
171	Shooto: 6/3 in Kitazawa Town Hall	June 3, 2005	Kitazawa Town Hall	Setagaya, Tokyo, Japan
170	Shooto: 5/29 in Kitazawa Town Hall	May 29, 2005	Kitazawa Town Hall	Setagaya, Tokyo, Japan
169	Shooto: Grapplingman 4	May 22, 2005	Tsuyama Community Hall	Okuyama, Japan
168	G-Shooto: Special 01	May 11, 2005	Zepp Nagoya	Nagoya, Aichi, Japan
167	Shooto: 5/8 in Osaka Prefectural Gymnasium	May 8, 2005	Osaka Prefectural Gymnasium	Osaka, Kansai, Japan
166	Shooto: 5/4 in Korakuen Hall	May 4, 2005	Korakuen Hall	Tokyo, Japan
165	Shooto: 4/23 in Hakata Star Lanes	April 23, 2005	Hakata Star Lanes	Hakata-ku, Fukuoka, Japan
164	Shooto: Gig Central 7	March 27, 2005	Nagoya Civic Assembly Hall	Nagoya, Aichi, Japan
163	G-Shooto: G-Shooto 02	March 12, 2005	Zepp Tokyo	Tokyo, Japan
162	Shooto: 3/11 in Korakuen Hall	March 11, 2005	Korakuen Hall	Tokyo, Japan
161	G-Shooto: Plus01	February 11, 2005	Shin-Kiba 1st Ring	Tokyo, Japan
160	Shooto: 2/6 in Kitazawa Town Hall	February 6, 2005	Kitazawa Town Hall	Setagaya, Tokyo, Japan
159	Shooto: 1/29 in Korakuen Hall	January 29, 2005	Korakuen Hall	Tokyo, Japan

== Shooto: 1/29 in Korakuen Hall ==
Shooto: 1/29 in Korakuen Hall was an event held on January 29, 2005 at Korakuen Hall in Tokyo, Japan.

=== Results ===
Main Card
Weight class				Method	Round	Time	Notes
	Kotetsu Boku	def.	Ryan Bow	Decision (Majority)	3	5:00
	Masanori Suda	def.	Brian Ebersole	Submission (Rear-Naked Choke)	3	2:59
	Mamoru Yamaguchi	def.	Junji Ikoma	Decision (Unanimous)	3	5:00
	Ganjo Tentsuku	def.	Takumi Nakayama	Decision (Unanimous)	3	5:00
	Shinya Aoki	def.	Keith Wisniewski	Submission (Standing Armlock)	1	2:22
	Shinichi Kojima	def.	Daiji Takahashi	Decision (Unanimous)	2	5:00
	Riki Fukuda	def.	Masaya Inoue	Decision (Unanimous)	2	5:00
	Kyotaro Nakao	vs.	Sakae Kasuya	Draw	2	5:00

== Shooto: 2/6 in Kitazawa Town Hall ==
Shooto: 2/6 in Kitazawa Town Hall was an event held on February 6, 2005 at Korakuen Hall in Tokyo, Japan.

=== Results ===
Main Card
Weight class				Method	Round	Time	Notes
	Yusuke Endo	def.	Komei Okada	TKO (Punches)	1	1:04
	So Tazawa	def.	Seiji Ozuka	TKO (Cut)	2	0:20
	Wataru Miki	def.	Takahiro Kajita	Decision (Split)	2	5:00
	Keita Nakamura	def.	Kentaro Maeda	Decision (Unanimous)	2	5:00
	Mizuto Hirota	def.	Masaaki Yamamori	TKO (Punches)	2	1:27
	Yutaka Nishioka	def.	Hiroshi Nakamura	Decision (Unanimous)	2	5:00
	Takeya Mizugaki	def.	Satoshi Yamashita	Decision (Unanimous)	2	5:00
	Yoshiyuki Yoshida	def.	Akihiro Yamazaki	Decision (Unanimous)	2	5:00

== G-Shooto: Plus01 ==
G-Shooto: Plus01 was an event held on February 11, 2005 at Korakuen Hall in Tokyo, Japan.

=== Results ===
Main Card
Weight class				Method	Round	Time	Notes
	Masako Yoshida	vs.	Akinori Akinori	Draw	2	5:00
	Kyoko Murakami	def.	Seri Saito	Technical Submission (Armbar)	1	2:13
	Yuki Furudate	def.	Emi Yamazaki	Technical Submission (Armbar)	1	3:15
	Fusako Ishikawa	def.	Ayumi Ayumi	Submission (Rear Naked Choke)	2	0:30

== Shooto: 3/11 in Korakuen Hall ==
Shooto: 3/11 in Korakuen Hall was an event held on March 11, 2005 at Korakuen Hall in Tokyo, Japan.

=== Results ===
Main Card
Weight class				Method	Round	Time	Notes
Featherweight	Alexandre Franca Nogueira (c)	def.	Joao Roque	Decision (Unanimous)	3	5:00	(Note: For the Featherweight Championship.)
	Rumina Sato	def.	Makoto Ishikawa	Decision (Unanimous)	3	5:00
	Takeshi Inoue	def.	Jin Kazeta	Submission (Rear-Naked Choke)	2	4:17
	Hideki Kadowaki	def.	Akitoshi Tamura	Decision (Unanimous)	2	5:00
	Tenkei Oda	def.	Keisuke Yamada	Decision (Unanimous)	2	5:00
	Ryuhei Sato	def.	Yoshinori Ashikawa	TKO (Punches)	1	0:54

== G-Shooto: G-Shooto 02 ==
G-Shooto: G-Shooto 02 was an event held on March 12, 2005 at Korakuen Hall in Tokyo, Japan.

=== Results ===
Main Card
Weight class				Method	Round	Time	Notes
	Megumi Fujii	def.	Ana Michelle Tavares	Decision (Unanimous)	2	5:00
	Tara LaRosa	def.	Megumi Yabushita	Decision (Majority)	2	5:00
	Tevi Say	vs.	Yuka Kimura	Draw	2	5:00
	Miku Matsumoto	def.	Izumi Noguchi	Decision (Unanimous)	2	5:00
	Sayaka Shioda	def.	Seri Saito	Submission (Reverse Triangle Choke)	1	3:59
	Kayo Nagayasu	def.	Yukiko Seki	Decision (Unanimous)	2	5:00
	Chihiro Takahashi	def.	Hisako Watanabe	Submission (Armbar)	1	1:53

== Shooto: Gig Central 7 ==
Shooto: Gig Central 7 was an event held on March 27, 2005 at Korakuen Hall in Tokyo, Japan.

=== Results ===
Main Card
Weight class				Method	Round	Time	Notes
	Hatsu Hioki	def.	Joe Pearson	Submission (Punches)	1	1:35
	Naoki Matsushita	def.	Ken Omatsu	Decision (Unanimous)	2	5:00
	Eiji Murayama	vs.	Takeshi Matsushita	Draw	2	5:00
	Keisuke Kurata	def.	Jyoji Yamaguchi	Decision (Unanimous)	2	5:00
	Yoshihiro Tomioka	def.	Kenichi Hattori	TKO (Punches)	1	0:30
	Takahiro Kajita	def.	Hiroshi Shiba	Decision (Split)	2	5:00
	Hayato Sato	vs.	Takashi Yamamoto	Draw	2	5:00
	Takamaro Watari	def.	Yasuji Numa	Decision (Unanimous)	2	5:00

== Shooto: 4/23 in Hakata Star Lanes ==
Shooto: 4/23 in Hakata Star Lanes was an event held on April 23, 2005 at Korakuen Hall in Tokyo, Japan.

=== Results ===
Main Card
Weight class				Method	Round	Time	Notes
	Tatsuya Kawajiri	def.	Jani Lax	TKO (Punches)	1	4:42
	Akira Kikuchi	def.	Jason Brudvik	TKO (Punches)	1	2:32
	Shiko Yamashita	def.	David Bielkheden	Decision (Majority)	3	5:00
	Kenichiro Togashi	def.	Yoichi Fukumoto	Submission (Triangle Choke)	1	3:20
	Homare Kuboyama	def.	Katsuhisa Akasaki	Decision (Unanimous)	2	5:00
	Hayate Usui	def.	Naosuke Mizoguchi	Submission (Kimura)	2	2:38

== Shooto: 5/4 in Korakuen Hall ==
Shooto: 5/4 in Korakuen Hall was an event held on May 4, 2005 at Korakuen Hall in Tokyo, Japan.

=== Results ===
Main Card
Weight class				Method	Round	Time	Notes
	Gilbert Melendez	def.	Naoya Uematsu	TKO (Cut)	2	4:30
	Mamoru Yamaguchi	def.	Stonnie Dennis	KO (Head Kick)	1	1:36
	Takashi Nakakura	def.	Ray Cooper	TKO (Cut)	2	1:14
	Kenji Osawa	def.	Jin Akimoto	Decision (Majority)	2	5:00
	Toshimichi Akagi	def.	Masaaki Sugawara	Submission (Heel Hook)	1	0:36
	Satoko Shinashi	def.	Pamela Vitz	Submission (Armbar)	1	2:13

== Shooto: 5/8 in Osaka Prefectural Gymnasium ==
Shooto: 5/8 in Osaka Prefectural Gymnasium was an event held on May 8, 2005 at Korakuen Hall in Tokyo, Japan.

=== Results ===
Main Card
Weight class				Method	Round	Time	Notes
	Junji Ikoma	def.	Hiroaki Yoshioka	Submission (Rear-Naked Choke)	3	1:36
	Fanjin Son	def.	Tsutomu Shiiki	KO (Punches)	1	3:13
	Takehiro Harusaki	def.	Atsushi Takeuchi	Decision (Majority)	2	5:00
	Masashi Yozen	def.	Tsuneyoshi Kashimura	KO (Punches)	1	0:26
	Teruyuki Matsumoto	def.	Joji Shimada	Decision (Unanimous)	2	5:00

== G-Shooto: Special 01 ==
G-Shooto: Special 01 was an event held on May 11, 2005 at Korakuen Hall in Tokyo, Japan.

=== Results ===
Main Card
Weight class				Method	Round	Time	Notes
	Takahiro Kajita	def.	Byon Sho Kim	Submission (Toe Hold)	1	3:16
	Yuki Furudate	def.	Do Yeon Kim	Submission (Armbar)	1	0:22
	Ei Hi Jin	def.	Chisato Yamada	Decision (Majority)	2	5:00
	Dae Won Kim	def.	Nobuyuki Shimakawa	Decision (Unanimous)	2	5:00
	Keisuke Kurata	def.	Hyo Jeon Lee	Submission (Heel Hook)	1	1:51
	Kyoko Takabayashi	def.	Yoshi Machida	Submission (Rear-Naked Choke)	1	1:10
	Emi Kuroda	def.	Yoko Oyama	Decision (Unanimous)	2	5:00

== Shooto: Grapplingman 4 ==
Shooto: Grapplingman 4 was an event held on May 22, 2005 at Korakuen Hall in Tokyo, Japan.

=== Results ===
Main Card
Weight class				Method	Round	Time	Notes
	Yutaka Tetsuka	def.	Tsuyoshi Okada	Decision (Unanimous)	2	5:00
	Keisuke Sakai	def.	Yoshifumi Dogaki	Submission (Rear Naked Choke)	2	4:14

== Shooto: 5/29 in Kitazawa Town Hall ==
Shooto: 5/29 in Kitazawa Town Hall was an event held on May 29, 2005 at Korakuen Hall in Tokyo, Japan.

=== Results ===
Main Card
Weight class				Method	Round	Time	Notes
	Takehiro Ishii	def.	Kenichi Sawada	TKO (Swollen Eye)	1	5:00
	Akiyo Nishiura	def.	Hiroshi Nakamura	KO (Punch)	2	3:57
	Yuki Shojo	def.	Hiroharu Matsufuji	Submission (Rear Naked Choke)	2	1:40
	Yusei Shimokawa	def.	Takuya Mori	Decision (Unanimous)	2	5:00
	Yuki Inoue	def.	Hirotaka Tomiyama	Decision (Unanimous)	2	5:00
	Kenichi Takeda	def.	Hiroaki Takezawa	Decision (Unanimous)	2	5:00

== Shooto: 6/3 in Kitazawa Town Hall ==
Shooto: 6/3 in Kitazawa Town Hall was an event held on June 3, 2005 at Korakuen Hall in Tokyo, Japan.

=== Results ===
Main Card
Weight class				Method	Round	Time	Notes
	Mizuto Hirota	def.	Komei Okada	TKO (Punches)	1	4:56
	Yutaka Nishioka	def.	Masanori Sugatani	Decision (Unanimous)	2	5:00
	Keita Nakamura	def.	Jun Kitagawa	Decision (Unanimous)	2	5:00
	Daisuke Matsumoto	def.	Tsuyoshi Irokawa	Decision (Unanimous)	2	5:00
	Akihiro Murayama	def.	Nobuyuki Shimakawa	TKO (Punches)	1	2:16
	Kentaro Maeda	def.	Takuhito Hida	Decision (Split)	2	5:00
	Takeya Mizugaki	def.	Naoki Yahagi	Decision (Unanimous)	2	5:00

== Shooto: Gig Central 8 ==
Shooto: Gig Central 8 was an event held on July 3, 2005 at Korakuen Hall in Tokyo, Japan.

=== Results ===
Main Card
Weight class				Method	Round	Time	Notes
	Daisuke Sugie	def.	Kultar Gill	Submission (Triangle Choke)	1	1:42
	Hatsu Hioki	def.	Hideki Kadowaki	Submission (Armbar)	2	3:34
	Takeyasu Hirono	def.	Keisuke Kurata	Decision (Majority)	2	5:00
	Hiroshi Umemura	def.	Manabu Kano	Submission (Rear Naked Choke)	1	3:01
	Masashi Yozen	def.	Jon Valuri	TKO (Cut)	2	0:12
	Hiroyuki Tanaka	def.	Akira Kibe	Decision (Majority)	2	5:00
	Ken Omatsu	def.	Takahiro Kajita	Decision (Majority)	2	5:00
	Kenichi Hattori	def.	Takashi Ochi	Technical Submission (Rear Naked Choke)	1	5:00

== G-Shooto: Plus02 ==
G-Shooto: Plus02 was an event held on July 12, 2005 at Korakuen Hall in Tokyo, Japan.

=== Results ===
Main Card
Weight class				Method	Round	Time	Notes
	Yasuko Mogi	def.	Masako Yoshida	Decision (Unanimous)	2	5:00
	Yasuko Tamada	def.	Maho Muranami	Decision (Split)	2	5:00
	Seri Saito	def.	Emi Kuroda	KO (Punch)	1	3:23
	Yuko Yamazaki	def.	Keiju Machida	KO (Head Kick)	1	0:21
	Akiko Itakura	def.	Mifuyu Sasaki	Submission (Keylock)	1	2:55

== Shooto: Shooter's Summer ==
Shooto: Shooter's Summer was an event held on July 14, 2005 at Korakuen Hall in Tokyo, Japan.

=== Results ===
Main Card
Weight class				Method	Round	Time	Notes
	Jin Kazeta	def.	Keisuke Yamada	KO (Knees to the Body)	1	3:38
	Takahiro Hosoi	def.	Seiji Ozuka	Decision (Unanimous)	2	5:00
	Yuki Inoue	vs.	Yoshihiro Koyama	Draw	2	5:00
	Masaaki Sugawara	def.	Ryuichi Miki	Decision (Unanimous)	2	5:00
	Yoshitaro Niimi	def.	Yoshiyuki Yoshida	Decision (Majority)	2	5:00
	Akihiro Murayama	def.	Yoshinori Ashikawa	TKO (Punches)	1	0:25
	Taisuke Okuno	def.	Tsuneyoshi Kashimura	TKO (Punches)	2	2:40

== Shooto 2005: 7/30 in Korakuen Hall ==
Shooto 2005: 7/30 in Korakuen Hall was an event held on July 30, 2005 at Korakuen Hall in Tokyo, Japan.

=== Results ===
Main Card
Weight class				Method	Round	Time	Notes
	Katsuya Toida	def.	Makoto Ishikawa	Submission (Rear Naked Choke)	2	4:09
	Masahiro Oishi	def.	Jin Akimoto	Technical Submission (Armbar)	1	3:14
	Kenichiro Togashi	def.	Ganjo Tentsuku	Decision (Unanimous)	3	5:00
	Shinya Aoki	def.	Shigetoshi Iwase	DQ (Low Blow)	1	0:35
	Homare Kuboyama	vs.	Setsu Iguchi	Draw	3	5:00
	Akitoshi Tamura	def.	Fanjin Son	Decision (Majority)	2	5:00
	Tetsu Suzuki	def.	Takao Tamura	Submission (Rear Naked Choke)	1	4:03
	Kabuto Kokage	def.	Koji Takeuchi	Decision (Unanimous)	2	5:00

== Shooto: Alive Road ==
Shooto: Alive Road was an event held on August 20, 2005 at Korakuen Hall in Tokyo, Japan.

=== Results ===
Main Card
Weight class				Method	Round	Time	Notes
	Gilbert Melendez	def.	Rumina Sato	TKO (Cut)	1	1:32
	Hayato Sakurai	def.	Shinya Aoki	Decision (Unanimous)	3	5:00
	Joachim Hansen	def.	Kenichiro Togashi	Decision (Unanimous)	3	5:00
	Antonio Carvalho	def.	Takeshi Inoue	Decision (Majority)	3	5:00
	Mitsuhiro Ishida	def.	Takashi Nakakura	TKO (Cut)	3	1:31
	Masashi Yozen	def.	Ryuhei Sato	Decision (Majority)	2	5:00
	Yutaka Nishioka	def.	Kyotaro Nakao	Decision (Unanimous)	2	5:00

== G-Shooto: Plus03 ==
G-Shooto: Plus03 was an event held on September 16, 2005 at Korakuen Hall in Tokyo, Japan.

=== Results ===
Main Card
Weight class				Method	Round	Time	Notes
	Miku Matsumoto	def.	Akiko Inoue	Decision (Unanimous)	2	5:00
	Yuki Furudate	def.	Yasuko Tamada	Decision (Split)	2	5:00
	Masako Yoshida	vs.	Maho Muranami	Draw	2	5:00
	Akinori Akinori	def.	Yukiko Seki	Submission (Armbar)	2	3:50
	Yuko Yamazaki	def.	Akiko Hayashida	Submission (Armbar)	2	3:45

== Shooto: 9/23 in Korakuen Hall ==
Shooto: 9/23 in Korakuen Hall was an event held on September 23, 2005 at Korakuen Hall in Tokyo, Japan.

=== Results ===
Main Card
Weight class				Method	Round	Time	Notes
	Mamoru Yamaguchi	def.	Pat Seidel	Submission (Rear-Naked Choke)	2	1:35
	Akitoshi Hokazono	def.	Marcos Galvao	Decision (Unanimous)	3	5:00
	Yasuhiro Urushitani	vs.	Shinichi Kojima	Draw	3	5:00
	Akitoshi Tamura	def.	Hayate Usui	Technical Submission (Rear Naked Choke)	2	4:51
	Tomonari Kanomata	def.	Wataru Miki	Decision (Unanimous)	2	5:00
	Mizuto Hirota	def.	Yoshihiro Koyama	Decision (Unanimous)	2	5:00
	Tenkei Oda	def.	Daisuke Matsumoto	KO (Punches)	1	3:03
	Yuki Shojo	vs.	Yutaka Tetsuka	Draw	2	5:00
	Yusei Shimokawa	def.	Toshimichi Akagi	Decision (Majority)	2	5:00
	Takeya Mizugaki	def.	Shin Kato	Decision (Majority)	2	5:00

== Shooto: Soulful Fight ==
Shooto: Soulful Fight was an event held on October 28, 2005 at Korakuen Hall in Tokyo, Japan.

=== Results ===
Main Card
Weight class				Method	Round	Time	Notes
	Akihiro Murayama	def.	Masashi Yozen	Decision (Unanimous)	2	5:00
	Takahiro Hosoi	def.	Mamoru Okochi	TKO (Punches)	1	1:51
	Masaaki Sugawara	def.	Hiroyasu Kodera	TKO (Broken Nose)	1	4:14
	Hiroshi Nakamura	def.	Seigi Fujioka	Decision (Unanimous)	2	5:00
	Ryuichi Miki	def.	Hiroharu Matsufuji	Submission (Rear Naked Choke)	2	1:56
	Naoki Yahagi	def.	Atsushi Asano	Decision (Unanimous)	2	5:00

== Shooto 2005: 11/6 in Korakuen Hall ==
Shooto 2005: 11/6 in Korakuen Hall was an event held on November 6, 2005 at Korakuen Hall in Tokyo, Japan.

=== Results ===
Main Card
Weight class				Method	Round	Time	Notes
	Shinya Aoki	def.	Kuniyoshi Hironaka	TKO (Cut)	1	2:10
	Hatsu Hioki	def.	Tom Niinimaki	Technical Submission (Armbar)	1	3:03
	Kenji Osawa	vs.	Daniel Lima	Draw	3	5:00
	Takeshi Inoue	def.	Akitoshi Tamura	Decision (Majority)	3	5:00
	Tenkei Oda	def.	Yutaka Nishioka	Decision (Majority)	2	5:00
	Yusei Shimokawa	def.	Yuki Shojo	Decision (Majority)	2	5:00
	Takeya Mizugaki	def.	Teruyuki Matsumoto	KO (Punch)	1	0:13
	Tetsu Suzuki	vs.	Takamaro Watari	Draw	2	5:00
	Keita Nakamura	def.	Katsuaki Niioka	Submission (Rear Naked Choke)	1	2:10
	Sakae Kasuya	def.	Akiyo Nishiura	Decision (Majority)	2	5:00

== G-Shooto: Plus04 ==
G-Shooto: Plus04 was an event held on November 11, 2005 at Korakuen Hall in Tokyo, Japan.

=== Results ===
Main Card
Weight class				Method	Round	Time	Notes
	Yuki Furudate	vs.	Masako Yoshida	Draw	2	5:00
	Akinori Akinori	def.	Akiko Inoue	Decision (Unanimous)	2	5:00
	Keiko Tamai	def.	Yumiko Sugimoto	Decision (Unanimous)	2	5:00
	Yuko Yamazaki	def.	Nanako Yamaseki	Decision (Majority)	2	5:00
	Mika Hayashi	def.	Yumiko Nagayama	Submission (Armbar)	1	2:24

== Shooto: Shooto & Kakumei Kickboxing ==
Shooto: Shooto & Kakumei Kickboxing was an event held on November 13, 2005 at Korakuen Hall in Tokyo, Japan.

=== Results ===
Main Card
Weight class				Method	Round	Time	Notes
	Hirosumi Sugiura	def.	Hirofumi Hara	Decision (Unanimous)	2	5:00
	Hiroyuki Tanaka	def.	Takao Tamura	Submission (Triangle Choke)	1	4:10
	Masaki Konishi	def.	Yosuke Mikami	KO (Punches)	1	1:02
	Tsuyoshi Okada	def.	Takehiro Harusaki	Decision (Majority)	2	5:00
	Shinji Sasaki	def.	Ken Omatsu	Submission (Triangle Choke)	1	4:17

== Shooto 2005: 11/29 in Kitazawa Town Hall ==
Shooto 2005: 11/29 in Kitazawa Town Hall was an event held on November 29, 2005 at Korakuen Hall in Tokyo, Japan.

=== Results ===
Main Card
Weight class				Method	Round	Time	Notes
	Tomohiro Hashi	vs.	Toshimichi Akagi	Draw	2	5:00
	Atsushi Takeuchi	def.	Takehiro Ishii	TKO (Punches)	2	2:30
	Kenichi Takeda	def.	Hayato Sato	Decision (Unanimous)	2	5:00
	Yoshitaro Niimi	def.	Kentaro Maeda	Decision (Unanimous)	2	5:00
	Fanjin Son	def.	Hirotaka Tomiyama	Decision (Unanimous)	2	5:00
	Yuji Inoue	def.	Daisuke Ishizawa	Decision (Unanimous)	2	5:00
	Kenichi Sawada	def.	Hiroaki Takezawa	Decision (Unanimous)	2	5:00
	Masakatsu Ueda	def.	Satoshi Yamashita	Decision (Unanimous)	2	5:00

== Shooto: 12/17 in Shinjuku Face ==
Shooto: 12/17 in Shinjuku Face was an event held on December 17, 2005 at Korakuen Hall in Tokyo, Japan.

=== Results ===
Main Card
Weight class				Method	Round	Time	Notes
	Mamoru Yamaguchi	def.	Daiji Takahashi	Decision (Unanimous)	3	5:00
	Ganjo Tentsuku	def.	Yusuke Endo	Decision (Unanimous)	3	5:00
	Shinichi Kojima	def.	Setsu Iguchi	TKO (Corner Stoppage)	2	0:31
	Mizuto Hirota	def.	Kabuto Kokage	Decision (Unanimous)	2	5:00
	Wataru Miki	def.	Komei Okada	Decision (Unanimous)	2	5:00
	Keita Nakamura	def.	Yoshiyuki Yoshida	Technical Decision (Majority)	2	4:06
	Takeya Mizugaki	def.	Tetsu Suzuki	Decision (Unanimous)	2	5:00
	Masatoshi Kobayashi	def.	Kyotaro Nakao	TKO (Cut)	1	3:36

== G-Shooto: G-Shooto 03 ==
G-Shooto: G-Shooto 03 was an event held on December 17, 2005 at Korakuen Hall in Tokyo, Japan.

=== Results ===
Main Card
Weight class				Method	Round	Time	Notes
	Megumi Fujii	def.	Dah Le Chon	Submission (Rear-Naked Choke)	1	0:19
	Misaki Takimoto	def.	Miku Matsumoto	Submission (Armbar)	1	3:08
	Hitomi Akano	def.	Keiko Tamai	Submission (Armbar)	1	1:27
	Masako Yoshida	def.	Kayo Nagayasu	Decision (Unanimous)	2	5:00
	Akiko Inoue	def.	Yukiko Seki	Decision (Unanimous)	2	5:00

== See also ==
- Shooto
- List of Shooto champions
- List of Shooto Events
