= 2011 in Shooto =

Mixed martial arts events

Information
- First date: January 10, 2011
- Last date: December 18, 2011

Events
- Total events: 22

Fights
- Total fights: 195
- Title fights: 5

Chronology
2010 in Shooto	2011 in Shooto	2012 in Shooto

The year 2011 is the 23rd year in the history of Shooto, a mixed martial arts promotion based in Japan. In 2011 Shooto held 22 events beginning with, Shooto: Shootor's Legacy 1.

== Title fights ==
Title fights in 2011
Weight class				Method	Round	Time	Event	Notes
Bantamweight	Koetsu Okazaki	def.	Shuichiro Katsumura (c)	TKO (Punches)	2	2:24	Shooto: Shooto Tradition 2011	(Note: For the Bantamweight Championship.)
Strawweight	Junji Ikoma	def.	Junji Ito	Decision (Unanimous)	3	5:00	Shooto: Shooto Tradition 2011	(Note: For the Strawweight Championship.)
Lightweight	Kuniyoshi Hironaka	def.	Kotetsu Boku	Decision (Unanimous)	3	5:00	Shooto: Shootor's Legacy 3	(Note: For the Lightweight Championship.)
Flyweight	Yasuhiro Urushitani (c)	def.	Yuki Shoujou	TKO (Head Kick and Punches)	2	0:24	Shooto: Shootor's Legacy 3	(Note: For the Flyweight Championship.)
Strawweight	Mikihito Yamagami	def.	Junji Ikoma (c)	KO (Punch)	1	0:41	Shooto: Shooto the Shoot 2011	(Note: For the Strawweight Championship.)

== Events list ==
#	Event title	Date	Arena	Location
335	Shooto: The Rookie Tournament 2011 Final	December 18, 2011	Shinjuku Face	Tokyo, Japan
334	Shooto: Spirit Aomori	November 27, 2011	Aomori Prefectural Budokan	Hirosaki, Aomori, Japan
333	Shoot Boxing / Rise / Sustain: SRS 2011 for Japan	November 11, 2011	Korakuen Hall	Tokyo, Japan
332	Shooto: Shooto the Shoot 2011	November 5, 2011	Tokyo Dome City Hall	Tokyo, Japan
331	Shooto: Gig North 7	October 16, 2011	Zepp Sapporo	Sapporo, Hokkaido, Japan
330	Shooto: Gig Central 23	October 2, 2011	Asunal Kanayama Hall	Nagoya, Aichi, Japan
329	Shooto: Shooting Disco 16: Regeneration	October 1, 2011	Shinjuku Face	Tokyo, Japan
328	Shooto: Shootor's Legacy 4	September 23, 2011	Korakuen Hall	Tokyo, Japan
327	Shooto: Border: Season 3: Roaring Thunder	September 4, 2011	Hirano Ward Community Hall	Osaka, Kansai, Japan
326	Shooto: Gig Tokyo 7	August 6, 2011	Shinjuku Face	Tokyo, Japan
325	Shooto: Shootor's Legacy 3	July 18, 2011	Korakuen Hall	Tokyo, Japan
324	Shooto: Shooting Disco 15: Try Hard, Japan!	June 11, 2011	Shinjuku Face	Tokyo, Japan
323	Shooto: Gig West 13	June 5, 2011	Abeno Ward Hall	Osaka, Kansai, Japan
322	Shooto: Gig Tokyo 6	May 28, 2011	Shinjuku Face	Tokyo, Japan
321	Shooto: Shooto Tradition 2011	April 29, 2011	Tokyo Dome City Hall	Tokyo, Japan
320	Shooto: Gig Central 22	April 17, 2011	Asunal Kanayama Hall	Nagoya, Aichi, Japan
319	Shooto: Gig Saitama 3	April 10, 2011	Fujimi Cultural Center	Fujimi, Saitama, Japan
318	Shooto: Border: Season 3: Spring Thunder	April 3, 2011	Hirano Ward Community Hall	Osaka, Kansai, Japan
317	Shooto: Shootor's Legacy 2	April 1, 2011	Shinjuku Face	Tokyo, Japan
316	Shooto: Genesis	March 21, 2011	Kokurakita Gym	Kitakyushu, Fukuoka, Japan
315	Shooto: Shooting Disco 14: 365-Step March	February 26, 2011	Shinjuku Face	Tokyo, Japan
314	Shooto: Shootor's Legacy 1	January 10, 2011	Korakuen Hall	Tokyo, Japan

== Shooto: Shootor's Legacy 1 ==
Shooto: Shootor's Legacy 1 was an event held on January 10, 2011, at Korakuen Hall in Tokyo, Japan.

=== Results ===
Main Card
Weight class				Method	Round	Time	Notes
	Yoshihiro Koyama	def.	Shinji Sasaki	TKO (Punches)	1	1:20
	Taiki Tsuchiya	def.	Tony Hervey	TKO (Punches)	1	4:25
	Yusuke Endo	def.	Daisuke Sugie	Decision (Majority)	3	5:00
	Masakatsu Ueda	def.	Ralph Acosta	Submission (Brabo Choke)	2	1:13
	Kotetsu Boku	def.	Yukinari Tamura	Decision (Unanimous)	3	5:00
	Shinichi Hanawa	def.	Toshimichi Akagi	Decision (Unanimous)	2	5:00
	Koshi Matsumoto	def.	Norio Tokuhisa	Decision (Unanimous)	2	5:00
	Koji Nishioka	def.	Daisuke Hoshino	Decision (Majority)	2	5:00
	Hiroshi Osato	def.	Takeshi Saito	Decision (Unanimous)	2	5:00
	Chuji Kato	vs.	Kensuke Nakamura	Draw	2	5:00
	Takuya Ogura	def.	Satoshi Kogure	KO (Knee)	1	2:39
	Shinichi Yoshioka	def.	Hiroshi Nakamura	Decision (Unanimous)	2	5:00

== Shooto: Shooting Disco 14: 365-Step March ==
Shooto: Shooting Disco 14: 365-Step March was an event held on February 26, 2011, at Shinjuku Face in Tokyo, Japan.

=== Results ===
Main Card
Weight class				Method	Round	Time	Notes
	Yoichiro Sato	vs.	Akihiro Murayama	Draw	3	5:00
	Shin Kochiwa	def.	Kazuya Satomoto	TKO (Punches)	2	1:27
	Naohiro Mizuno	def.	Yuta Nezu	Decision (Majority)	2	5:00
	Tatsuya Nakashima	def.	Akinobu Watanabe	DQ (Low Blow)	1	0:52
	Kota Onojima	def.	Daiki Takashima	Decision (Unanimous)	2	5:00
	Takayuki Hirose	def.	Komei Okada	Decision (Unanimous)	2	5:00
	Minoru Takeuchi	def.	Hideto Okada	Decision (Majority)	2	5:00
	Takafumi Ato	def.	Takahito Tomozawa	Decision (Majority)	2	5:00
	Nobumitsu Osawa	def.	Jin Suzuki	Decision (Majority)	2	5:00
	Koji Nishioka	vs.	Hideto Kondo	Draw	2	5:00
	Yusuke Kasuya	def.	Yohei Ota	Submission (Rear-Naked Choke)	1	4:14
	Kotaro Hagiwara	def.	Yuta Horikawa	Submission (Rear-Naked Choke)	1	3:46

== Shooto: Genesis ==
Shooto: Genesis was an event held on March 21, 2011, at Kokurakita Gym in Kitakyushu, Fukuoka, Japan.

=== Results ===
Main Card
Weight class				Method	Round	Time	Notes
	Hiroshige Tanaka	def.	Takumi Ota	Decision (Unanimous)	2	5:00
	Minoru Takeuchi	def.	Katsuhisa Akasaki	Submission (Guillotine Choke)	1	1:40
	Hiroaki Nakayama	def.	Taiki Hamasaki	Submission (Rear-Naked Choke)	2	1:44
	Takayoshi Ono	def.	Daijo Nosaka	Decision (Unanimous)	2	5:00
	Shoki Omichi	def.	Tadahiro Harada	KO (Punch)	1	3:31
	Masatoshi Ueno	vs.	Susumu Kitajima	Draw	2	5:00
	Shota Kondo	def.	Seichi Suwaki	Decision (Unanimous)	2	5:00
	Naoki Yoshioka	def.	Nobuyasu Fujikawa	KO (Punch)	2	1:51

== Shooto: Shootor's Legacy 2 ==
Shooto: Shootor's Legacy 2 was an event held on April 1, 2011, at Shinjuku Face in Tokyo, Japan.

=== Results ===
Main Card
Weight class				Method	Round	Time	Notes
	Kiyotaka Shimizu	def.	Junya Kodo	Submission (Rear-Naked Choke)	2	3:16
	Wataru Miki	def.	Takayoshi Ono	Submission (Inverted Triangle Armbar)	2	4:06
	Kosuke Suzuki	vs.	Tadaaki Yamamoto	Draw	2	5:00
	Yuta Sasaki	def.	Yoshifumi Nakamura	Decision (Majority)	2	5:00
	Yusei Shimokawa	vs.	Takehiro Ishii	Draw	2	5:00
	Kenji Yamamoto	def.	Kenta Sakuma	Decision (Unanimous)	2	5:00

== Shooto: Border: Season 3: Spring Thunder ==
Shooto: Border: Season 3: Spring Thunder was an event held on April 3, 2011, at Hirano Ward Community Hall in Osaka, Kansai, Japan.

=== Results ===
Main Card
Weight class				Method	Round	Time	Notes
	Hiromasa Ougikubo	def.	Teruyuki Matsumoto	Decision (Majority)	3	5:00
	Junji Ikoma	vs.	Takeshi Sato	Draw (Split)	3	5:00
	Hiroshi Shiba	def.	Kota Shimoishi	Submission (Inverted Triangle Choke)	1	2:28
	Kentaro Watanabe	def.	Hayato Sato	TKO (Corner Stoppage)	2	2:00
	Bunpei Umezono	def.	Katsuyoshi Beppu	Decision (Unanimous)	2	5:00
	Gota Yamashita	def.	Toshiyuki Yoshikawa	Decision (Unanimous)	2	5:00
	Yuya Shibata	def.	Yu Kuwabara	Decision (Majority)	2	5:00
	Teruto Ishihara	def.	Takuya Kodama	Decision (Unanimous)	2	5:00

== Shooto: Gig Saitama 3 ==
Shooto: Gig Saitama 3 was an event held on April 10, 2011, at Fujimi Cultural Center in Fujimi, Saitama, Japan.

=== Results ===
Main Card
Weight class				Method	Round	Time	Notes
	Hideki Kadowaki	vs.	Kosuke Kindaichi	Draw	2	5:00
	Akinobu Watanabe	def.	Yuya Kaneuchi	Decision (Unanimous)	2	5:00
	Shuichiro Okumura	def.	Hiroyuki Shida	Decision (Unanimous)	2	5:00
	Yasutaka Hamaji	def.	Yosuke Ebihara	DQ (Knee to Downed Fighter)	1	3:20
	Takeshi Saito	def.	Ryosuke Miura	Decision (Unanimous)	2	5:00
	Kazuya Tanaka	def.	Yoshinori Suzuki	Decision (Unanimous)	2	5:00
	Michinori Tanaka	def.	Hiroshi Roppongi	Technical Submission (Armbar)	2	1:29

== Shooto: Gig Central 22 ==
Shooto: Gig Central 22 was an event held on April 17, 2011, at Asunal Kanayama Hall in Nagoya, Aichi, Japan.

=== Results ===
Main Card
Weight class				Method	Round	Time	Notes
	Takasuke Kume	def.	Jung Min Kang	Submission (Kimura)	2	1:23
	Takahiro Kajita	def.	Taro Kusano	Decision (Unanimous)	2	5:00
	Kenichi Hattori	def.	Tsuneo Kimura	Submission (Armbar)	1	3:58
	Makoto Maeda	vs.	Takahiro Suzuki	Draw	2	5:00
	Yuki Nishigo	def.	Shinobu Aoyama	Decision (Unanimous)	2	5:00
	Daiki Ozaki	def.	Shinji Maeguchi	Submission (Rear-Naked Choke)	2	2:44
	Jun Nakamura	def.	Gen Ikeda	Submission (Armbar)	1	1:41

== Shooto: Shooto Tradition 2011 ==
Shooto: Shooto Tradition 2011 was an event held on April 29, 2011, at Tokyo Dome City Hall in Tokyo, Japan.

=== Results ===
Main Card
Weight class				Method	Round	Time	Notes
	Takeshi Inoue	def.	Taiki Tsuchiya	TKO (Punches)	2	4:27
Featherweight	Koetsu Okazaki	def.	Shuichiro Katsumura (c)	TKO (Punches)	2	2:24	(Note: For the Featherweight Championship.)
	Hatsu Hioki	def.	Donald Sanchez	Submission (Triangle Choke)	2	1:36
Strawweight	Junji Ikoma	def.	Junji Ito	Decision (Unanimous)	3	5:00	(Note: For the Strawweight Championship.)
	Kuniyoshi Hironaka	def.	Takashi Nakakura	Decision (Unanimous)	3	5:00
	Yuki Shojo	def.	Noboru Tahara	Decision (Unanimous)	3	5:00
	Mikihito Yamagami	def.	Atsushi Takeuchi	Decision (Unanimous)	3	5:00
	Kyoji Horiguchi	def.	Takahiro Hosoi	TKO (Punches)	1	1:06
	Koshi Matsumoto	vs.	Akira Okada	Draw	2	5:00
	Munehiro Kin	def.	Daisuke Hoshino	DQ (Kick to the Groin)	2	1:27

== Shooto: Gig Tokyo 6 ==
Shooto: Gig Tokyo 6 was an event held on May 28, 2011, at Shinjuku Face in Tokyo, Japan.

=== Results ===
Main Card
Weight class				Method	Round	Time	Notes
	Kenichiro Togashi	def.	Shin Kochiwa	Decision (Unanimous)	3	5:00
	Guy Delumeau	def.	Yusuke Yachi	Decision (Unanimous)	2	5:00
	Haruo Ochi	def.	Kosuke Suzuki	KO (Punch)	2	2:10
	Kenji Yamamoto	def.	Minoru Takeuchi	KO (Punch)	2	2:12
	Chuji Kato	def.	Yoshinori Suzuki	Decision (Unanimous)	2	5:00
	Yusuke Kasuya	def.	Yoshikazu Fujiishi	Submission (Rear-Naked Choke)	1	4:47
	Shoki Omichi	def.	Hiroaki Fujita	Submission (Armbar)	2	4:20
	Ukyo Abe	def.	Takuya Oyama	Technical Submission (Armbar)	1	2:12
	Kenji Yamanaka	vs.	Yusuke Ogikubo	Draw	2	3:00
	Shuji Negishi	def.	Yukitaka Musashi	Decision (Unanimous)	2	3:00
	Shun Miyakawa	def.	Takaaki Ito	Decision (Unanimous)	2	3:00

== Shooto: Gig West 13 ==
Shooto: Gig West 13 was an event held on June 5, 2011, at Abeno Ward Hall in Osaka, Kansai, Japan.

=== Results ===
Main Card
Weight class				Method	Round	Time	Notes
	Takahiro Kajita	def.	Hiroshi Shiba	Decision (Unanimous)	2	5:00
	Seiji Akao	def.	Nobuhiro Hayakawa	Decision (Unanimous)	2	5:00
	Teruto Ishihara	def.	Naritoshi Kakuta	KO (Punch)	1	4:56
	Gota Yamashita	def.	Yasushi Kato	Submission (Kimura)	1	3:22
	Daiki Ozaki	def.	Taiki Hamasaki	Submission (Arm-Triangle Choke)	1	4:54
	Takayuki Kobayashi	def.	Tomoya Suzuki	KO (Punches)	2	3:22
	Yuki Nishigo	def.	Ryosuke Miura	Submission (Armbar)	1	5:00

== Shooto: Shooting Disco 15: Try Hard, Japan! ==
Shooto: Shooting Disco 15: Try Hard, Japan! was an event held on June 11, 2011, at Shinjuku Face in Tokyo, Japan.

=== Results ===
Main Card
Weight class				Method	Round	Time	Notes
	Akihiro Murayama	def.	Yoichiro Sato	Decision (Unanimous)	3	5:00
	Masaaki Sugawara	def.	Shinichi Hanawa	Technical Submission (Rear-Naked Choke)	3	4:56
	Koji Nishioka	def.	Yuji Inoue	Decision (Unanimous)	2	5:00
	Akinobu Watanabe	def.	Tatsuya Nakashima	Submission (Rear-Naked Choke)	1	2:09
	Satoshi Inaba	def.	Komei Okada	Decision (Unanimous)	2	5:00
	Hiroshi Osato	vs.	Isao Yoshida	Draw	2	5:00
	Takuya Ogura	def.	Shinichi Yoshioka	Submission (Armbar)	1	3:28
	Kazuya Tanaka	vs.	Hideto Kondo	Draw	2	5:00
	Hideto Okada	vs.	Satoshi Kogure	Draw	2	5:00
	Hiroaki Ijima	def.	Yu Kuwabara	Decision (Majority)	2	5:00
	Shuichiro Okumura	vs.	Takahito Tomozawa	Draw	2	5:00
	Kenta Sakuma	def.	Daiki Gojima	KO (Punch)	2	2:42

== Shooto: Shootor's Legacy 3 ==
Shooto: Shootor's Legacy 3 was an event held on July 18, 2011, at Korakuen Hall in Tokyo, Japan.

=== Results ===
Main Card
Weight class				Method	Round	Time	Notes
Lightweight	Kuniyoshi Hironaka	def.	Kotetsu Boku	Decision (Unanimous)	3	5:00	(Note: For the Lightweight Championship.)
Flyweight	Yasuhiro Urushitani (c)	def.	Yuki Shojo	TKO (Head Kick and Punches)	2	0:24	(Note: For the Flyweight Championship.)
	Masakatsu Ueda	def.	Rumina Sato	KO (Kick to the Body)	1	4:23
	Tetsu Suzuki	def.	Akitoshi Tamura	Submission (Triangle Kimura)	3	2:45
	Wataru Miki	def.	Ikuo Usuda	Submission (Rear-Naked Choke)	3	2:20
	Masato Sannai	def.	Teruyuki Matsumoto	TKO (Punches)	1	0:38
	Kyoji Horiguchi	def.	Yuta Nezu	KO (Punch)	1	3:17
	Yuta Sasaki	def.	Kosuke Kindaichi	Decision (Majority)	2	5:00
	Jun Nakamura	def.	Jun Nabeshima	Submission (Armbar)	2	3:00
	Yoshifumi Nakamura	def.	Shoki Omichi	Submission (Arm-Triangle Choke)	2	1:59
	Satoshi Inaba	def.	Fumiya Sasaki	Decision (Majority)	2	5:00

== Shooto: Gig Tokyo 7 ==
Shooto: Gig Tokyo 7 was an event held on August 6, 2011, at Shinjuku Face in Tokyo, Japan.

=== Results ===
Main Card
Weight class				Method	Round	Time	Notes
	Issei Tamura	def.	Katsuya Toida	KO (Punches)	1	1:23
	Shinichi Kojima	def.	Masaaki Sugawara	Decision (Split)	3	5:00
	Yosuke Saruta	def.	Akinobu Watanabe	Submission (Rear-Naked Choke)	1	1:00
	Michinori Tanaka	def.	Takuya Ogura	Submission (Triangle Choke)	1	3:09
	Takeshi Saito	def.	Yasutaka Ishigami	KO (Slam)	2	0:43
	Kensuke Nakamura	def.	Yoshinori Suzuki	Decision (Majority)	2	5:00
	Tatsuro Kamei	def.	Keiji Koizumi	Decision (Unanimous)	2	5:00
	Kenichiro Marui	def.	Keita Ishibashi	Decision (Unanimous)	2	5:00
	Yamato Okada	def.	Takahito Tomozawa	Decision (Majority)	2	5:00
	Yuya Onodera	def.	Kazuya Tanaka	Submission (Brabo Choke)	1	1:33
	Kotaro Hagiwara	def.	Masahiro Yokoyama	Decision (Majority)	2	5:00
	Shota Kondo	def.	Noriyuki Takei	Submission (Guillotine Choke)	2	3:43

== Shooto: Border: Season 3: Roaring Thunder ==
Shooto: Border: Season 3: Roaring Thunder was an event held on September 4, 2011, at Hirano Ward Community Hall in Osaka, Kansai, Japan.

=== Results ===
Main Card
Weight class				Method	Round	Time	Notes
	Masayoshi Kato	def.	Takehiro Harusaki	Submission (Guillotine Choke)	1	2:05
	Teruto Ishihara	def.	Kenji Yamamoto	KO (Punch)	1	0:16
	Takahiro Kohori	def.	Toshio Mitani	Submission (Armbar)	2	1:48
	Akihito Sasao	def.	Itsuki Hiruma	Decision (Majority)	2	5:00
	Yuya Shibata	def.	Susumu Kitajima	Submission (Kimura)	1	0:22
	Hiroshi Osato	def.	Yuki Nishigo	Decision (Split)	2	5:00
	Kentaro Watanabe	def.	Kosuke Suzuki	KO (Punch)	1	4:48

== Shooto: Shootor's Legacy 4 ==
Shooto: Shootor's Legacy 4 was an event held on September 23, 2011, at Korakuen Hall in Tokyo, Japan.

=== Results ===
Main Card
Weight class				Method	Round	Time	Notes
	Yoshihiro Koyama	def.	Kenichiro Togashi	Decision (Split)	3	5:00
	Akihiro Murayama	def.	Keita Nakamura	Submission (Rear-Naked Choke)	1	2:30
	Kyoji Horiguchi	def.	Naohiro Mizuno	KO (Punches)	2	3:26
	Shin Kochiwa	def.	Shinji Sasaki	Decision (Unanimous)	3	5:00
	Guy Delumeau	def.	Yuta Sasaki	Decision (Unanimous)	3	5:00
	Haruo Ochi	def.	Ryuichi Miki	Decision (Split)	2	5:00
	Kosuke Kindaichi	def.	Kazuhiro Ito	Submission (Kimura)	2	3:49
	Koji Nishioka	def.	Fumihiko Kawamura	Decision (Unanimous)	2	5:00
	Hirosumi Sugiura	def.	Tetsuo Seto	Submission (Rear-Naked Choke)	2	4:47

== Shooto: Shooting Disco 16: Regeneration ==
Shooto: Shooting Disco 16: Regeneration was an event held on October 1, 2011, at Shinjuku Face in Tokyo, Japan.

=== Results ===
Main Card
Weight class				Method	Round	Time	Notes
	Shinichi Hanawa	def.	Daiji Takahashi	KO (Punches)	2	2:10
	Yusaku Inoue	def.	Takahiro Suzuki	KO (Punch)	1	0:09
	Yusuke Kasuya	vs.	Takayuki Kobayashi	Technical Draw	2	0:23
	Takayuki Hirose	vs.	Hideki Nishino	Draw	2	5:00
	Jun Nakamura	def.	Takafumi Ato	Submission (Armbar)	1	1:34
	Chuji Kato	def.	Satoshi Inaba	Submission (Kimura)	1	4:26
	Daiki Takashima	def.	Yoshinori Suzuki	Decision (Unanimous)	2	5:00
	Hiroaki Ijima	def.	Yoshiyuki Takano	Decision (Unanimous)	2	5:00
	Satoshi Kogure	def.	Yasutaka Hamaji	Submission (Armbar)	1	0:54
	Keita Kono	def.	Hiroaki Fujita	Submission (Guillotine Choke)	2	2:09
	Kenta Sakuma	def.	Hideto Okada	Decision (Majority)	2	5:00
	Jin Suzuki	def.	Hiroaki Sakuma	Submission (Triangle Choke)	1	3:18

== Shooto: Gig Central 23 ==
Shooto: Gig Central 23 was an event held on October 2, 2011, at Asunal Kanayama Hall in Nagoya, Aichi, Japan.

=== Results ===
Main Card
Weight class				Method	Round	Time	Notes
	Hiroyuki Tanaka	def.	Masatoshi Abe	Decision (Majority)	3	5:00
	Kota Shimoishi	def.	Takahiro Kajita	Decision (Unanimous)	2	5:00
	Takumi Ota	def.	Kenichi Hattori	Decision (Majority)	2	5:00
	Akinobu Watanabe	def.	Ichaku Murata	Decision (Majority)	2	5:00
	Tadaaki Yamamoto	def.	Kenichi Sawada	Decision (Unanimous)	2	5:00
	Masanobu Mori	def.	Takahito Tomozawa	Submission (Rear-Naked Choke)	2	3:43
	Minoru Takeuchi	def.	Hidekazu Fukushima	Submission (Anaconda Choke)	1	3:48
	Yoshifumi Nakamura	def.	Daiki Ozaki	Decision (Unanimous)	2	5:00
	Akihito Sasao	def.	Shota Kondo	Decision (Unanimous)	2	5:00

== Shooto: Gig North 7 ==
Shooto: Gig North 7 was an event held on October 16, 2011, at Zepp Sapporo in Sapporo, Hokkaido, Japan.

=== Results ===
Main Card
Weight class				Method	Round	Time	Notes
	Fumihiro Kitahara	def.	Junya Kodo	Submission (Rear-Naked Choke)	2	3:57
	Daisuke Ishizawa	def.	Nobuhiro Hayakawa	Decision (Unanimous)	2	5:00
	Tatsuya Yamamoto	def.	Atsushi Mochizuki	Submission (Rear-Naked Choke)	1	2:31
	Michiyuki Ishibashi	vs.	Daisuke Sasaki	Draw (Unanimous)	2	5:00
	Isao Yoshida	def.	Nariyasu Fujita	Submission (Triangle Choke)	2	1:10
	Junpei Chikano	def.	Ukyo Abe	KO (Punch)	1	1:46
	Takashi Niikuni	def.	Hiroshi Roppongi	KO (Punch)	1	4:24

== Shooto: Shooto the Shoot 2011 ==
Shooto: Shooto the Shoot 2011 was an event held on November 5, 2011, at Tokyo Dome City Hall in Tokyo, Japan.

=== Results ===
Main Card
Weight class				Method	Round	Time	Notes
Strawweight	Mikihito Yamagami	def.	Junji Ikoma (c)	KO (Punch)	1	0:41	(Note: For the Strawweight Championship.)
	Shinichi Kojima	def.	Kiyotaka Shimizu	Decision (Unanimous)	3	5:00
	Tenkei Oda	vs.	Wataru Miki	Draw (Split)	3	5:00
	Guy Delumeau	def.	Issei Tamura	Decision (Majority)	3	5:00
	Nico Verresen	def.	Rumina Sato	KO (Punch)	1	4:17
	Akitoshi Tamura	def.	Shigeki Osawa	Decision (Unanimous)	3	5:00
	Kentaro Watanabe	def.	Ryuichi Miki	Decision (Unanimous)	2	5:00
	Daisuke Hoshino	def.	Akira Okada	Technical Submission (Rear-Naked Choke)	1	0:36
	Koshi Matsumoto	def.	Takahiro Kajita	Decision (Unanimous)	2	5:00

== Shoot Boxing / Rise / Sustain: SRS 2011 for Japan ==
Shoot Boxing / Rise / Sustain: SRS 2011 for Japan was an event held on November 11, 2011, at Korakuen Hall in Tokyo, Japan.

=== Results ===
Main Card
Weight class				Method	Round	Time	Notes
	Masato Sannai	def.	Jong Hoon Choi	Submission (Triangle Choke)	2	3:45
	Shinji Sasaki	vs.	Koji Nishioka	Draw (Majority)	2	5:00
	Yuya Shibata	def.	Kotaro Hagiwara	Submission (Kimura)	1	3:31
	Takayuki Kobayashi	def.	Yohei Ota	KO (Punches)	2	0:28

== Shooto: Spirit Aomori ==
Shooto: Spirit Aomori was an event held on November 27, 2011, at Aomori Prefectural Budokan in Hirosaki, Aomori, Japan.

=== Results ===
Main Card
Weight class				Method	Round	Time	Notes
	Tsuneo Kimura	vs.	Yo Saito	Draw (Majority)	2	5:00
	Kota Onojima	def.	Takuya Ogura	KO (Punches)	1	1:58
	Nobumitsu Osawa	def.	Yuya Onodera	KO (Punches)	1	1:37
	Daisuke Sasaki	def.	Kazuya Tanaka	Submission (Leg Scissor Choke)	1	4:52
	Nariyasu Fujita	def.	Tomoaki Ota	Decision (Unanimous)	2	5:00
	Yutaka Saito	def.	Fumiya Sasaki	Decision (Unanimous)	2	5:00

== Shooto: The Rookie Tournament 2011 Final ==
Shooto: The Rookie Tournament 2011 Final was an event held on December 18, 2011, at Shinjuku Face in Tokyo, Japan.

=== Results ===
Main Card
Weight class				Method	Round	Time	Notes
	Shinya Murofushi	def.	Masayoshi Kato	Submission (Hammerlock)	2	3:15
	Tadaaki Yamamoto	def.	Katsuya Murofushi	Technical Submission (Rear-Naked Choke)	2	0:25
	Yusuke Yachi	def.	Kazuhiro Ito	Decision (Unanimous)	2	5:00
	Michinori Tanaka	def.	Teruto Ishihara	Decision (Unanimous)	2	5:00
	Yoshifumi Nakamura	def.	Chuji Kato	Submission (Arm-Triangle Choke)	3	2:58
	Yusuke Kasuya	def.	Nobumitsu Osawa	Submission (Toe Hold)	1	2:25
	Yuya Shibata	def.	Hiroshi Osato	Technical Submission (Rear-Naked Choke)	1	4:12
	Jun Nakamura	def.	Akihito Sasao	Decision (Unanimous)	2	5:00
	Yuki Okano	def.	Gota Yamashita	Decision (Unanimous)	2	5:00

== See also ==
- List of Shooto champions
- List of Shooto Events
