= Takahiro Kajita =

Japanese mixed martial artist

Takahiro Kajita 梶田隆弘
- Born: July 24, 1976 (age 50); Japan
- Nationality: Japanese
- Height: 5 ft 8 in (1.73 m)
- Weight: 145 lb (66 kg; 10.4 st)
- Division: Lightweight
- Team: Grappling Shoot Boxers
- Years active: 2004 - 2012

Mixed martial arts record
- Total: 41
- Wins: 18
- By knockout: 7
- By submission: 2
- By decision: 9
- Losses: 18
- By submission: 4
- By decision: 14
- Draws: 5

Other information
- Mixed martial arts record from Sherdog

Takahiro Kajita Japanese: 梶田隆弘 (born July 24, 1976) is a Japanese mixed martial artist. He competed in the Lightweight division.

== Mixed martial arts record ==
Professional record breakdown
41 matches	18 wins	18 losses
By knockout	7	0
By submission	2	4
By decision	9	14
Draws	5	

Res.	Record	Opponent	Method	Event	Date	Round	Time	Location	Notes
Loss	18-18-5	Shota Shidochi	Decision (Unanimous)	Deep: Cage Impact 2012 in Tokyo: 2nd Round	December 8, 2012	2	5:00	Tokyo, Japan	
Win	18-17-5	Seong-Jae Kim	Decision (Unanimous)	Deep: Nagoya Impact 2012: Kobudo Fight	July 22, 2012	2	5:00	Nagoya	
Loss	17-17-5	Taro Kusano	Decision (Unanimous)	Deep: Osaka Impact	May 26, 2012	2	5:00	Osaka, Japan	
Loss	17-16-5	Yusuke Kagiyama	Decision (Unanimous)	Deep: Nagoya Impact: Kobudo Fight	March 25, 2012	2	5:00	Kasugai	
Win	17-15-5	Charles Bellemare	TKO (Punches)	Deep: Fujisan Festival	January 29, 2012	2	3:20	Fuji	
Win	16-15-5	Juri Ohara	Decision (Unanimous)	Deep: 56 Impact	December 16, 2011	2	5:00	Tokyo, Japan	
Loss	15-15-5	Koshi Matsumoto	Decision (Unanimous)	Shooto: Shooto the Shoot 2011	November 5, 2011	2	5:00	Tokyo, Japan	
Loss	15-14-5	Kota Shimoishi	Decision (Unanimous)	Shooto: Gig Central 23	October 2, 2011	2	5:00	Nagoya, Aichi, Japan	
Loss	15-13-5	Hiroki Aoki	Submission (Rear-Naked Choke)	Deep: Cage Impact 2011 in Nagoya	July 10, 2011	2	2:15	Nagoya	
Win	15-12-5	Hiroshi Shiba	Decision (Unanimous)	Shooto: Gig West 13	June 5, 2011	2	5:00	Osaka, Kansai, Japan	
Win	14-12-5	Taro Kusano	Decision (Unanimous)	Shooto: Gig Central 22	April 17, 2011	2	5:00	Nagoya, Aichi, Japan	
Draw	13-12-5	Hisaki Hiraishi	Draw (Unanimous)	Pancrase: Passion Tour 12	December 19, 2010	2	5:00	Osaka, Osaka, Japan	
Win	13-12-4	Tristan Connelly	Decision (Unanimous)	Deep: Cage Impact in Nagoya	July 11, 2010	2	5:00	Nagoya	
Win	12-12-4	Michiyuki Ishibashi	Decision (Split)	Shooto: Gig Central 20	June 13, 2010	2	5:00	Nagoya, Aichi, Japan	
Loss	11-12-4	Yasuaki Kishimoto	Submission (Rear-Naked Choke)	Deep: Kobudo Fight 9	April 11, 2010	2	4:57	Nagoya	
Win	11-11-4	Jun Kito	Submission (Armbar)	BC: Battle Code 1	December 13, 2009	2	2:58	Nagoya, Aichi, Japan	
Loss	10-11-4	Takafumi Ito	Decision (Unanimous)	Pancrase: Changing Tour 7	November 8, 2009	2	5:00	Osaka, Osaka, Japan	
Loss	10-10-4	Hisaki Hiraishi	Decision (Unanimous)	Shooto: Gig Central 18	August 30, 2009	2	5:00	Nagoya, Aichi, Japan	
Win	10-9-4	Yuya Osugi	TKO (Punches)	Deep: Toyama Impact	June 28, 2009	1	3:36	Toyama	
Loss	9-9-4	Paolo Milano	Decision (Split)	Shooto: Gig Central 17	April 12, 2009	2	5:00	Nagoya, Aichi, Japan	
Draw	9-8-4	Tomoyuki Fukami	Draw	Deep: clubDeep Kyoto	August 30, 2008	2	5:00	Kyoto	
Win	9-8-3	Komei Okada	Decision (Unanimous)	Shooto: Gig Central 15	August 3, 2008	2	5:00	Nagoya, Aichi, Japan	
Loss	8-8-3	Yoshihiro Tomioka	Submission (Kimura)	Deep: clubDeep Toyama: Barbarian Festival 7	June 1, 2008	2	2:59	Toyama	
Loss	8-7-3	Yutaka Ueda	Decision (Unanimous)	Shooto: Gig Central 14	March 16, 2008	2	5:00	Nagoya, Aichi, Japan	
Win	8-6-3	Hiroshi Shiba	Decision (Majority)	Deep: Protect Impact 2007	December 22, 2007	2	5:00	Osaka	
Loss	7-6-3	Kosuke Umeda	Decision (Majority)	Deep: clubDeep Tokyo	September 15, 2007	2	5:00	Tokyo, Japan	
Loss	7-5-3	Un Sik Song	Submission (Triangle Choke)	MARS 8: Burning Red	July 20, 2007	1	2:56	Tokyo, Japan	
Win	7-4-3	Marcelo Shigeo Kobayashi	TKO (Punches)	Deep: clubDeep Nagoya: MB3z Impact, Power of a Dream	June 10, 2007	1	2:40	Nagoya	
Loss	6-4-3	Yoshihiro Koyama	Decision (Majority)	Shooto: Gig Central 12	March 25, 2007	2	5:00	Nagoya, Aichi, Japan	
Win	6-3-3	Saburo Kawakatsu	TKO (Punches)	Shooto: Gig Central 11	November 26, 2006	1	4:43	Nagoya, Aichi, Japan	
Win	5-3-3	Yosuke Mikami	KO (Punch)	Shooto: Gig Central 10	September 17, 2006	1	2:06	Nagoya, Aichi, Japan	
Draw	4-3-3	Tomoyuki Fukami	Draw	Real Rhythm: 4th Stage	July 30, 2006	2	5:00	Osaka, Japan	
Win	4-3-2	Rodrigo Facca	TKO (Punches)	Deep: clubDeep Nagoya: MB3z Impact, Di Entrare	May 21, 2006	1	3:19	Nagoya	
Draw	3-3-2	Joe Camacho	Draw	Real Rhythm: 3rd Stage	March 4, 2006	2	5:00	Osaka, Japan	
Draw	3-3-1	Kazuhide Terashita	Draw	Deep: clubDeep Toyama: Barbarian Festival 3	October 30, 2005	2	5:00	Toyama	
Loss	3-3	Ken Omatsu	Decision (Majority)	Shooto: Gig Central 8	July 3, 2005	2	5:00	Nagoya, Aichi, Japan	
Win	3-2	Byon Sho Kim	Submission (Toe Hold)	G-Shooto: Special 01	May 11, 2005	1	3:16	Nagoya, Aichi, Japan	
Win	2-2	Hiroshi Shiba	Decision (Split)	Shooto: Gig Central 7	March 27, 2005	2	5:00	Nagoya, Aichi, Japan	
Loss	1-2	Wataru Miki	Decision (Split)	Shooto: 2/6 in Kitazawa Town Hall	February 6, 2005	2	5:00	Setagaya, Tokyo, Japan	
Loss	1-1	Seiki Uchimura	Decision (Unanimous)	Shooto 2004: 7/4 in Kitazawa Town Hall	July 4, 2004	2	5:00	Setagaya, Tokyo, Japan	
Win	1-0	Toshikazu Iseno	KO (Head Kick)	Shooto: Gig Central 5	March 28, 2004	1	4:50	Nagoya, Aichi, Japan	

== See also ==
- List of male mixed martial artists
