= Gota Yamashita =

Japanese mixed martial arts fighter

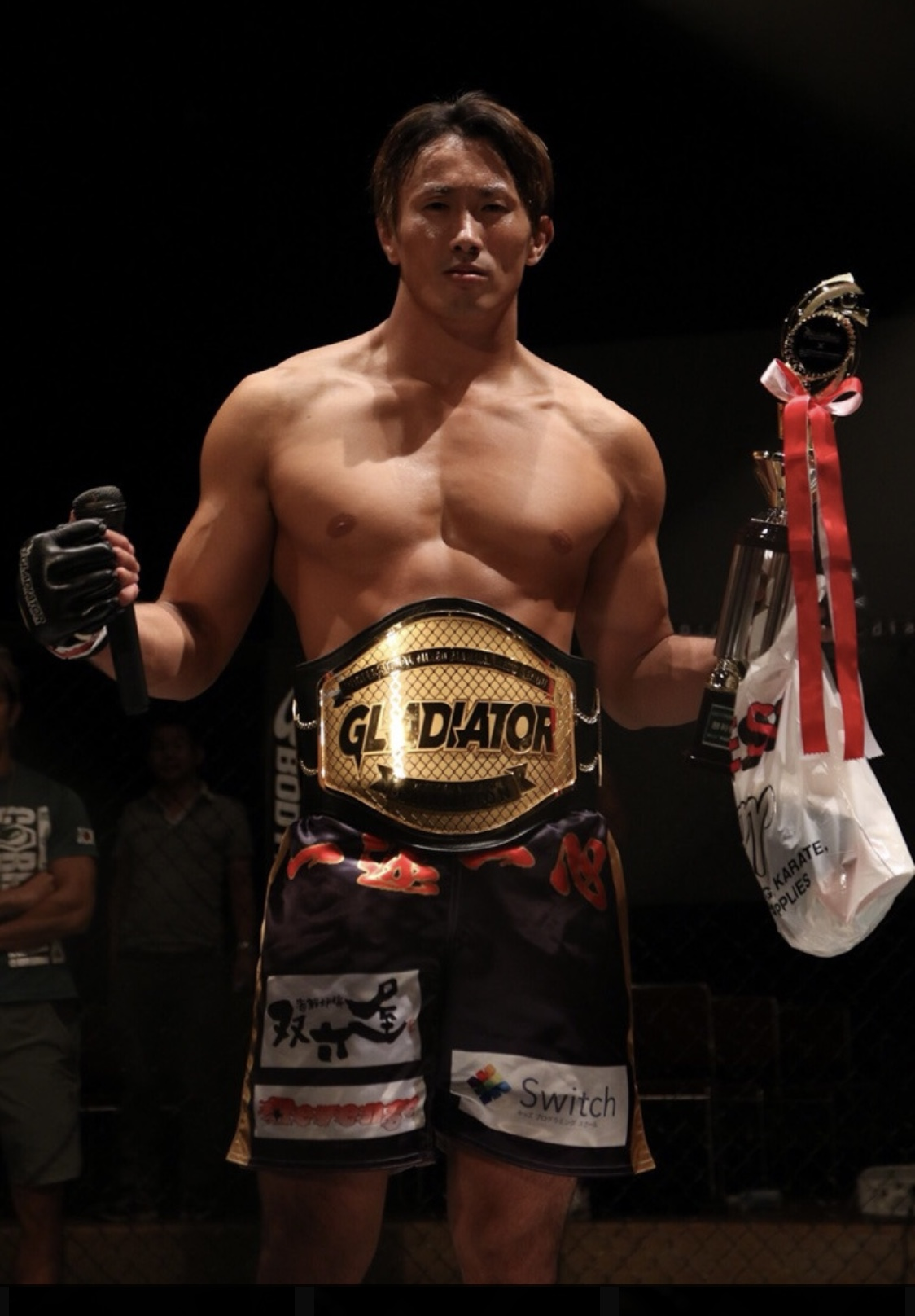
- Born: September 11, 1989 (age 37); Amagasaki, Hyogo, Japan
- Other names: Let's Gota
- Nationality: Japanese
- Height: 5 ft 9 in (1.75 m)
- Weight: 170 lb (77 kg; 12 st)
- Division: Welterweight
- Fighting out of: Amagasaki, Hyogo, Japan
- Team: Cobra Kai MMA Dojo
- Years active: 2010–present

Mixed martial arts record
- Total: 28
- Wins: 15
- By knockout: 4
- By submission: 2
- By decision: 9
- Losses: 11
- By knockout: 4
- By submission: 3
- By decision: 4
- Draws: 1
- No contests: 1

Other information
- Mixed martial arts record from Sherdog

Gota Yamashita (山下 豪太, Yamashita Gota; born September 11, 1989)

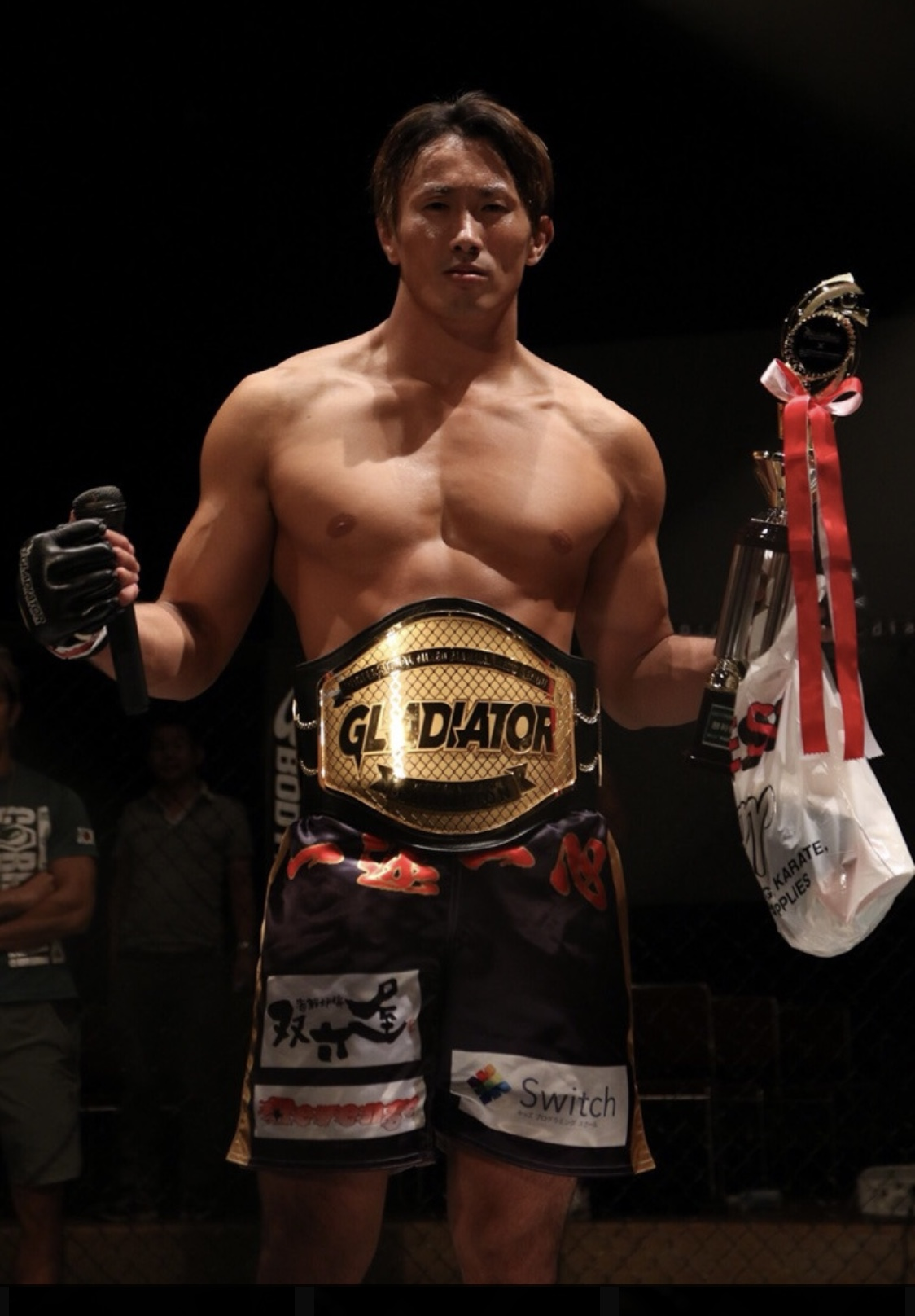
Gota Yamashita

is a Japanese mixed martial artist. He is a former welterweight King of Pancrase.

== Mixed martial arts career ==
=== Early career ===
Yamashita started his professional career in 2010. Except for his first bout, he fought only for Shooto.

Yamashita faced Yuki Okano on December 18, 2011, at Shooto: The Rookie Tournament 2011 Final for Shooto middleweight (168 lb) rookie title. He had his first career's defeat via unanimous decision after two rounds (20–18, 20–18, 20–18).

=== Pancrase ===
Yamashita faced Tamotsu Kitada on May 19, 2013, at Pancrase 247 in the semifinal match of Pancrase's Neo–Blood welterweight tournament. He won via TKO in the second round.

In the final on July 28, 2013, at Pancrase 250, Yamashita faced Toshikazu Suzuki. Suzuki defeated him via TKO early in the second round.

Coming off two wins after his setback against Suzuki, Yamashita faced Akihiro Murayama on August 10, 2014, at Pancrase 260 for the vacant welterweight King of Pancrase title. Yamashita won via unanimous decision after three rounds and became the new 170–pound King of Pancrase.

Yamashita defended his title against longtime mixed martial arts veteran Yuki Kondo on December 6, 2014, at Pancrase 263. He defeated Kondo via unanimous decision after three rounds.

=== Rizin ===
Yamashita signed with Rizin FF and made his promotional debut against Ryuichiro Sumimura at Rizin 25 on November 21, 2020. Yamashita lost the fight via split decision.

=== DEEP ===
Gota then faced Daichi Abe for the interim DEEP Welterweight Championship at DEEP 100 on February 21, 2021. He lost the fight via first-round technical knockout due to an injury.

== Championships and accomplishments ==
=== Mixed martial arts ===
- Pancrase
  - Welterweight King of Pancrase (one time; current)
    - One successful title defense
  - Neo–Blood welterweight tournament runner–up (2013)
- Shooto
  - Shooto 168 lb rookie tournament runner–up (2011)
- Gladiator
  - Gladiator Welterweight Championship (one time)
    - Two successful title defenses

== Mixed martial arts record ==
Professional record breakdown
28 matches	15 wins	11 losses
By knockout	4	4
By submission	2	3
By decision	9	4
Draws	1	
No contests	1	

Res.	Record	Opponent	Method	Event	Date	Round	Time	Location	Notes
Loss	15–11–1 (1)	Daichi Abe	TKO (finger injury)	DEEP 100 Impact - 20th Anniversary	21 February 2021	1	2:34	Tokyo, Japan	For the interim DEEP Welterweight Championship.
Loss	15–10–1 (1)	Ryuichiro Sumimura	Decision (split)	Rizin 25	November 21, 2020	3	5:00	Osaka, Japan	
Win	15–9–1 (1)	Kyohei Wakimoto	Submission (armbar)	Gladiator 012 in Osaka	February 23, 2020	2	4:40	Osaka, Japan	
Loss	14–9–1 (1)	Hiromitsu Miura	TKO (punches)	Pancrase 309	October 20, 2019	1	1:08	Tokyo, Japan	
Draw	14–8–1 (1)	Yun Jae Jung	Draw	Gladiator 009 in Osaka	April 14, 2019	2	5:00	Osaka, Japan	
Loss	14–8 (1)	Daryl Lokuku	Decision (unanimous)	Grachan 37 x Gladiator 008	December 2, 2018	3	5:00	Osaka, Japan	For the vacant GRACHAN Welterweight Championship.
Win	14–7 (1)	Makoto Maeda	KO (head kick)	Gladiator x Demolition Vol. 2	September 2, 2018	1	0:13	Sakai, Japan	Defended the Gladiator Welterweight Championship.
Loss	13–7 (1)	Masayuki Hamagishi	Submission (rear-naked choke)	Grandslam 6 - Way of the Cage	October 29, 2017	2	2:15	Tokyo, Japan	
Win	13–6 (1)	Hyung Seok Lee	Decision (unanimous)	Gladiator 004 in Wakayama	August 13, 2017	2	5:00	Wakayama, Japan	
Loss	12–6 (1)	Kyung Pyo Kim	Decision (majority)	Gladiator 003 in Wakayama	March 5, 2017	3	5:00	Wakayama, Japan	
Win	12–5 (1)	Jun Hee Moon	Decision (unanimous)	Gladiator 002 in Osaka	November 23, 2016	3	5:00	Osaka, Japan	Defended the vacant Gladiator Welterweight Championship.
Win	11–5 (1)	Yuta Nakamura	Decision (unanimous)	Gladiator 001 in Wakayama	June 19, 2016	3	5:00	Wakayama, Japan	Won the vacant Gladiator Welterweight Championship.
Loss	10–5 (1)	Nelson Carvalho	Submission (rear-naked choke)	HEAT 37	March 6, 2016	1	0:52	Nagoya, Japan	For the HEAT Welterweight Championship.
Loss	10–4 (1)	Shingo Suzuki	Submission (rear-naked choke)	Pancrase 270	October 4, 2015	2	3:56	Tokyo, Japan	Lost the Pancrase Welterweight Championship.
Loss	10–3 (1)	Shingo Suzuki	TKO (punches)	Pancrase 267	May 31, 2015	2	2:22	Tokyo, Japan	
Win	10–2 (1)	Yuki Kondo	Decision (unanimous)	Pancrase 263	December 6, 2014	3	5:00	Tokyo, Japan	Defended the Pancrase Welterweight Championship.
Win	9–2 (1)	Akihiro Murayama	Decision (unanimous)	Pancrase 260	August 10, 2014	3	3:00	Tokyo, Japan	Won the vacant Pancrase Welterweight Championship.
Win	8–2 (1)	Kenta Takagi	Decision (unanimous)	Pancrase 258	May 11, 2014	3	3:00	Tokyo, Japan	
Win	7–2 (1)	Akihiro Yamazaki	Decision (majority)	Pancrase 254	December 7, 2013	2	5:00	Osaka, Japan	
Loss	6–2 (1)	Toshikazu Suzuki	TKO (punches)	Pancrase 250: 2013 Neo–Blood Tournament Finals	July 28, 2013	2	0:26	Tokyo, Japan	2013 Neo–Blood welterweight tournament final.
Win	6–1 (1)	Tamotsu Kitada	TKO (punches)	Pancrase 247	May 19, 2013	2	4:01	Tokyo, Japan	2013 Neo–Blood welterweight tournament semifinal.
Win	5–1 (1)	Shigeaki Kusayanagi	Decision (split)	Pancrase: Progress Tour 12	November 10, 2012	2	5:00	Tokyo, Japan	
NC	4–1 (1)	Seiki Ryo	No contest (leg injury)	Pancrase: Progress Tour 10	September 1, 2012	1	1:45	Tokyo, Japan	
Win	4–1	Kosei Kubota	TKO (punches)	Pancrase: Progress Tour 5	April 28, 2012	1	2:37	Tokyo, Japan	
Loss	3–1	Yuki Okano	Decision (unanimous)	Shooto: The Rookie Tournament 2011 Final	December 18, 2011	2	5:00	Tokyo, Japan	For 2011 Shooto rookie title (168 lb).
Win	3–0	Yasushi Kato	Submission (kimura)	Shooto: Gig West 13	June 5, 2011	1	3:22	Osaka, Japan	
Win	2–0	Toshiyuki Yoshikawa	Decision (unanimous)	Shooto: Border: Season 3: Spring Thunder	April 3, 2011	2	5:00	Osaka, Japan	
Win	1–0	Tomoyuki Suda	TKO (punch)	GCM: Demolition West	April 3, 2010	1	1:16	Osaka, Japan	
