= Daniel Lima =

Brazilian martial artist

- Born: 3 May 1980 (age 46); Brasília, Brazil
- Other names: Little Devil
- Weight: 121 lb (55 kg; 8.6 st)
- Style: BJJ, Wrestling, Muay Thai

Mixed martial arts record
- Total: 13
- Wins: 7
- By knockout: 0
- By submission: 4
- By decision: 3
- Losses: 4
- By knockout: 0
- By submission: 0
- By decision: 4
- Draws: 2
- No contests: 0

Other information
- Mixed martial arts record from Sherdog

Daniel Lima (born 3 May 1980) is a Brazilian-Australian professional mixed martial artist. He holds record of 8–4–2. He is currently living on the Gold Coast, QLD, Australia.

== Biography ==
Daniel Lima was born on 28 December 1980 in Brasília, Brazil. Growing up, he always had interest in Martial Arts, especially the native martial arts of Brazil; Capoeira and Jiu Jitsu. At the age of 15, Daniel decided to focus all his energy into Brazilian jiu-jitsu. Daniel soon made a name for himself as a strong competitor, winning competitions and titles all over the world in both Brazilian jiu-jitsu and Mixed Martial Arts. These titles include winning the National title in Brazil, the North American Grappling Association title in the United States and the XFC mixed martial arts title in Australia. Daniel has also competed in Japan, New Zealand and the Philippines, and has been ranked number two in the world by the Shooto Association which is the oldest mixed martial arts association in the world. Some major titles he holds are, Brazilian jiu-jitsu National Champion, North American Submission Wrestling Champion and X.F.C Australian Champion.

== BJJ ==
Lima is the Head coach of Fight Club BJJ on the Gold Coast (Miami) in Queensland, Australia. Over the years his teaching ability has grown with his reputation. Together in Brazil, he and Marcio Bittencourt combined their teams to form Fight Club Jiu-Jitsu, which became one of the strongest teams in Bahia, Brazil. From there, Marcio continued to grow and strengthen the team in Brazil while Daniel took Fight Club Jiu-Jitsu around the world. He taught in the US, New Zealand and finally Australia in 2003. He has expanded Fight Club Jiu-Jitsu into a diverse and fast growing organisation in various locations throughout his new home of Australia. He has led Fight Club Jiu-Jitsu to win many championships, including producing world champions of Brazilian jiu-jitsu and international level mixed martial arts fighters. He has also promoted several people to Black Belt in BJJ.

Daniel Lima also has extensive qualifications in the Martial Arts and Sporting areas including Cert II Sport & Recreation, Cert III Sport & Recreation, Cert IV Sport & Recreation, Cert III Fitness, Cert IV Fitness, Cert IV Assessment in Workplace Training, Diploma in Sports Coaching and Advanced Diploma in Sports Recreation, Defensive Tactics Instructor, Dynamic Simulation Instructor, Spontaneous Knife Defence Instructor, Senior First Aid Certificate and Working with Children Blue Card.

== Mixed martial arts record ==
Professional record breakdown
14 matches	8 wins	4 losses
By knockout	1	0
By submission	4	0
By decision	3	4
Draws	2	

Res.	Record	Opponent	Method	Event	Date	Round	Time	Location	Notes
Loss	8–4–2	Seiji Otsuka	Decision (split)	Nitro MMA	27 August 2010	3	5:00	Cleveland/QLD, Australia	
Win	8–3–2	Kenji Osawa	Decision (split)	Shooto: Back To Our Roots 5	22 September 2007	3	5:00	Tokyo, Japan	
Win	7–3–2	Albert Manners	Decision	Warriors Realm: Warriors Realm 10	11 August 2007	3	5:00	Southport/QLD, Australia	
Win	6–3–2	Ayumu Shioda	Decision (unanimous)	Warriors Realm: Warriors Realm 9	12 May 2007	3	5:00	Southport/QLD, Australia	
Loss	5–3–2	Yasuhiro Urushitani	Decision (unanimous)	MARS: MARS World Grand Prix	13 May 2006	2	5:00		
Win	5–2–2	Joe Lira	Submission (armbar)	X: plosion: X-plosion 13	18 March 2006	1	N/A	Brisbane/QLD, Australia	
Draw	4–2–2	Kenji Osawa	Draw	Shooto 2005: 11/6 in Korakuen Hall	6 November 2005	3	5:00		
Draw	4–2–1	Akitoshi Hokazono	Draw	Shooto 2004: 10/17 in Osaka Prefectural Gymnasium	17 October 2004	3	5:00		
Loss	4–2	Ryoto Matsune	Decision (unanimous)	Shooto: Shooto Junkie is Back!	27 June 2004	3	5:00		
Win	4–1	Jamie Ballard	Submission (armbar)	Shooto: Australia: NHB	20 May 2004	1	N/A		
Loss	3–1	Eben Kaneshiro	Decision (unanimous)	Fearless 2: Bad Blood	13 December 2003	3	5:00	Pasig, Philippines	
Win	3–0	Ben Manderson	Submission (guillotine choke)	Xtreme Fighting Championships 2	30 August 2003	1	0:49	Queensland, Australia	
Win	2–0	Stephen Gillinder	Submission (triangle choke)	Xtreme Fighting Championships 1	4 May 2003	1	1:18	Queensland, Australia	
