= 2007 in Shooto =

Mixed martial arts events

Information
- First date: January 26, 2007
- Last date: December 8, 2007

Events
- Total events: 22

Fights
- Total fights: 168
- Title fights: 4

Chronology
2006 in Shooto	2007 in Shooto	2008 in Shooto

The year 2007 is the 19th year in the history of Shooto, a mixed martial arts promotion based in Japan. In 2007 Shooto held 22 events beginning with, Shooto: Battle Mix Tokyo 1.

== Title fights ==
Title fights in 2007
Weight class				Method	Round	Time	Event	Notes
Welterweight	Shinya Aoki (c)	def.	Akira Kikuchi	Decision (Split)	3	5:00	Shooto: Back To Our Roots 1	(Note: For the Welterweight Championship.)
Flyweight	Shinichi Kojima (c)	vs.	Yasuhiro Urushitani	Draw	3	5:00	Shooto: Back To Our Roots 2	(Note: For the Flyweight Championship.)
Featherweight	Akitoshi Tamura	def.	Takeshi Inoue (c)	Decision (Unanimous)	3	5:00	Shooto: Back To Our Roots 3	(Note: For the Featherweight Championship.)
Middleweight	Siyar Bahadurzada	def.	Shiko Yamashita	Decision (Unanimous)	3	5:00	Shooto: Back To Our Roots 4	(Note: For the Middleweight Championship.)

== Events list ==
#	Event title	Date	Arena	Location
233	Shooto: Rookie Tournament 2007 Final	December 8, 2007	Shinjuku Face	Tokyo, Japan
232	Shooto: Back To Our Roots 6	November 8, 2007	Korakuen Hall	Tokyo, Japan
231	Shooto: Shooting Disco 3: Everybody Fight Now	October 20, 2007	Shinjuku Face	Tokyo, Japan
230	Shooto: Gig Central 13	October 8, 2007	Nagoya International Conference Hall	Nagoya, Aichi, Japan
229	Shooto: Gig West 8	September 29, 2007	Azalea Taisho Hall	Osaka, Kansai, Japan
228	Shooto: Back To Our Roots 5	September 22, 2007	Korakuen Hall	Tokyo, Japan
227	Shooto: Gig North 1	September 2, 2007	Zepp Sapporo	Sapporo, Hokkaido, Japan
226	Shooto: Shooting Disco 2: The Heat Rises Tonight	August 5, 2007	Shinjuku Face	Tokyo, Japan
225	Shooto: Battle Mix Tokyo 4	July 20, 2007	Tokyo Kinema Club	Tokyo, Japan
224	Shooto: Back To Our Roots 4	July 15, 2007	Korakuen Hall	Tokyo, Japan
223	Shooto 2007: 6/30 in Kitazawa Town Hall	June 30, 2007	Kitazawa Town Hall	Setagaya, Tokyo, Japan
222	Shooto: Shooting Disco 1: Saturday Night Hero	June 2, 2007	Shinjuku Face	Tokyo, Japan
221	Shooto: Battle Mix Tokyo 3	May 26, 2007	Tokyo Kinema Club	Tokyo, Japan
220	Shooto: Back To Our Roots 3	May 18, 2007	Korakuen Hall	Tokyo, Japan
219	Shooto: Grapplingman 6	May 13, 2007	Hiroshima Industrial Hall	Hiroshima, Japan
218	Shooto: Gig West 7	April 21, 2007	Azalea Taisho Hall	Osaka, Kansai, Japan
217	Shooto: Battle Mix Tokyo 2	March 30, 2007	Tokyo Kinema Club	Tokyo, Japan
216	Shooto: Gig Central 12	March 25, 2007	Zepp Nagoya	Nagoya, Aichi, Japan
215	Shooto: Back To Our Roots 2	March 16, 2007	Korakuen Hall	Tokyo, Japan
214	Shooto: It's Strong Being a Man	March 4, 2007	Kitazawa Town Hall	Setagaya, Tokyo, Japan
213	Shooto: Back To Our Roots 1	February 17, 2007	Pacifico Yokohama	Yokohama, Kanagawa, Japan
212	Shooto: Battle Mix Tokyo 1	January 26, 2007	Tokyo Kinema Club	Tokyo, Japan

== Shooto: Battle Mix Tokyo 1 ==
Shooto: Battle Mix Tokyo 1 was an event held on January 26, 2007, at Yoyogi National Gymnasium in Tokyo, Japan.

=== Results ===
Main Card
Weight class				Method	Round	Time	Notes
	Atsushi Takeuchi	def.	Kenichi Takeda	KO (Punches)	1	4:42
	Hayate Usui	def.	Hiroki Kita	Decision (Unanimous)	2	5:00
	Megumi Fujii	def.	Masako Yoshida	Submission (Heel Hook)	1	0:51
	Kayo Nagayasu	def.	Maho Muranami	Decision (Unanimous)	2	5:00
	Eri Kaneya	def.	Emi Tomimatsu	Submission (Rear-Naked Choke)	2	3:46
	Chie Chie	def.	Nanako Yamaseki	TKO (Punches)	2	3:03

== Shooto: Back To Our Roots 1 ==
Shooto: Back To Our Roots 1 was an event held on February 17, 2007, at Yoyogi National Gymnasium in Tokyo, Japan.

=== Results ===
Main Card
Weight class				Method	Round	Time	Notes
Welterweight	Shinya Aoki (c)	def.	Akira Kikuchi	Decision (Split)	3	5:00	(Note: For the Welterweight Championship.)
	Takashi Nakakura	def.	Mizuto Hirota	Decision (Unanimous)	3	5:00
	Akitoshi Tamura	def.	Tenkei Oda	Decision (Unanimous)	3	5:00
	Takeshi Inoue	def.	Hiroyuki Abe	KO (Punch)	1	4:05
	Yusuke Endo	def.	Ganjo Tentsuku	Decision (Unanimous)	3	5:00
	Kotetsu Boku	vs.	Kenichiro Togashi	Draw	3	5:00
	Atsushi Yamamoto	def.	Takeya Mizugaki	Decision (Unanimous)	3	5:00

== Shooto: It's Strong Being a Man ==
Shooto: It's Strong Being a Man was an event held on March 4, 2007, at Yoyogi National Gymnasium in Tokyo, Japan.

=== Results ===
Main Card
Weight class				Method	Round	Time	Notes
	Akihiro Murayama	def.	Seiji Furukawa	Submission (Keylock)	1	0:39
	Yuki Shojo	def.	Ayumu Shioda	KO (Punches)	2	0:45
	Akihiro Yamazaki	def.	Mateus Irie Nechio	Submission (Ankle Lock)	1	1:38
	Yuji Inoue	def.	Nobuyuki Minami	TKO (Doctor Stoppage)	2	3:21
	Hiromasa Ougikubo	vs.	Naoki Yahagi	Draw	2	5:00
	Shintaro Ishiwatari	def.	Tomonori Taniguchi	TKO (Doctor Stoppage)	1	3:41
	Yosuke Ebihara	def.	Yuichiro Takase	Submission (Rear Naked Choke)	1	1:49
	Kunio Nakajima	vs.	Shinobu Miura	Draw	2	5:00

== Shooto: Back To Our Roots 2 ==
Shooto: Back To Our Roots 2 was an event held on March 16, 2007, at Yoyogi National Gymnasium in Tokyo, Japan.

=== Results ===
Main Card
Weight class				Method	Round	Time	Notes
Flyweight	Shinichi Kojima (c)	vs.	Yasuhiro Urushitani	Draw	3	5:00	(Note: For the Flyweight Championship.)
	Rumina Sato	def.	Augusto Frota	TKO (Cut)	1	1:21
	Akiyo Nishiura	def.	Hideki Kadowaki	Decision (Split)	3	5:00
	Masakatsu Ueda	def.	So Tazawa	Submission (Brabo Choke)	3	2:00
	Shinya Murofushi	def.	Takehiro Ishii	KO (Knee)	1	1:33
	Yoshitaro Niimi	def.	Ivan Musardo	TKO (Punches)	2	4:21
	Tatsuya Yamamoto	def.	Katsuya Murofushi	Decision (Unanimous)	2	5:00
	Kosuke Eda	vs.	Kazuya Tamura	Draw	2	5:00

== Shooto: Gig Central 12 ==
Shooto: Gig Central 12 was an event held on March 25, 2007, at Yoyogi National Gymnasium in Tokyo, Japan.

=== Results ===
Main Card
Weight class				Method	Round	Time	Notes
	Yasuhiro Akagi	def.	Homare Kuboyama	Submission (Armbar)	2	2:06
	Yoshihiro Koyama	def.	Takahiro Kajita	Decision (Majority)	2	5:00
	Hiroshi Umemura	def.	Takamaro Watari	Submission (Rear Naked Choke)	1	2:03
	Teruyuki Matsumoto	def.	Akira Kibe	Decision (Unanimous)	2	5:00
	Hiroshi Sakamoto	def.	Teppei Masuda	TKO (Punches)	2	1:05
	Tomokazu Yuasa	vs.	Takasuke Kume	Draw	2	5:00
	Satoru Ota	def.	Yuta Nezu	Decision (Majority)	2	5:00
	Makoto Maeda	vs.	Takashi Goto	Draw	2	5:00

== Shooto: Battle Mix Tokyo 2 ==
Shooto: Battle Mix Tokyo 2 was an event held on March 30, 2007, at Yoyogi National Gymnasium in Tokyo, Japan.

=== Results ===
Main Card
Weight class				Method	Round	Time	Notes
	Junji Ikoma	def.	Toshimichi Akagi	Decision (Split)	2	5:00
	Takehiro Harusaki	def.	Kenichi Sawada	Decision (Split)	2	5:00
	Toshikazu Iseno	def.	Guy Delumeau	Decision (Unanimous)	2	5:00
	Keisuke Sakai	def.	Paolo Milano	Submission (Keylock)	1	2:26
	Megumi Yabushita	def.	Mizuho Sato	Decision (Unanimous)	2	5:00
	Yasuko Tamada	def.	Kayo Nagayasu	Decision (Unanimous)	2	5:00
	Kyoko Takabayashi	def.	Yuko Yamazaki	Submission (Armbar)	1	3:06

== Shooto: Gig West 7 ==
Shooto: Gig West 7 was an event held on April 21, 2007, at Yoyogi National Gymnasium in Tokyo, Japan.

=== Results ===
Main Card
Weight class				Method	Round	Time	Notes
	Junya Kodo	def.	Yasuaki Nagamoto	Decision (Majority)	2	5:00
	Daisuke Okumiya	def.	Hirotoshi Konishi	Decision (Unanimous)	2	5:00
	Toshihiko Sugimoto	def.	Toru Ishinaka	Submission (Triangle Choke)	2	2:37
	Yasuhiro Kanayama	vs.	Nobuhiro Hayakawa	Draw	2	5:00
	Daisuke Matsumoto	def.	Tsutomu Shiiki	KO (Punch)	1	0:38
	Takao Tamura	def.	Manabu Kano	Submission (Armbar)	1	4:41

== Shooto: Grapplingman 6 ==
Shooto: Grapplingman 6 was an event held on May 13, 2007, at Yoyogi National Gymnasium in Tokyo, Japan.

=== Results ===
Main Card
Weight class				Method	Round	Time	Notes
	Tsuyoshi Okada	def.	Takeyasu Hirono	Decision (Split)	2	5:00
	Shinji Sasaki	def.	Masato Fujiwara	Submission (Triangle Choke)	1	3:04
	Yutaka Ueda	def.	Kazuya Satomoto	Decision (Unanimous)	2	5:00
	Kazuhiro Ito	def.	Takumi Ota	Submission (Armbar)	1	0:26
	Takaaki Oban	def.	Seiji Furukawa	Submission (Kimura)	1	3:43
	Tatsuro Kamei	def.	Kenya Kato	Submission (Triangle Choke)	1	2:32

== Shooto: Back To Our Roots 3 ==
Shooto: Back To Our Roots 3 was an event held on May 18, 2007, at Yoyogi National Gymnasium in Tokyo, Japan.

=== Results ===
Main Card
Weight class				Method	Round	Time	Notes
Featherweight	Akitoshi Tamura	def.	Takeshi Inoue (c)	Decision (Unanimous)	3	5:00	(Note: For the Featherweight Championship.)
	Antonio Carvalho	def.	Hatsu Hioki	Decision (Split)	3	5:00
	Marcos Galvao	def.	Kenji Osawa	Decision (Majority)	3	5:00
	Koetsu Okazaki	def.	Atsushi Yamamoto	Decision (Majority)	3	5:00
	Masatoshi Abe	def.	Daniel Otero	DQ	2	4:38
	Hayate Usui	def.	Eiji Murayama	Decision (Unanimous)	2	5:00
	Shinya Murofushi	vs.	Kenichi Sawada	Draw	2	5:00
	Masashi Yozen	def.	Akihiko Adachi	TKO (Punches)	2	1:26
	Michiyuki Ishibashi	def.	Kunio Nakajima	Decision (Unanimous)	2	5:00
	Hidekazu Asakura	def.	Masakazu Taguchi	KO (Punch)	1	3:50
	Naohiro Mizuno	def.	Yoshiki Noguchi	TKO (Punches)	2	2:54

== Shooto: Battle Mix Tokyo 3 ==
Shooto: Battle Mix Tokyo 3 was an event held on May 26, 2007, at Yoyogi National Gymnasium in Tokyo, Japan.

=== Results ===
Main Card
Weight class				Method	Round	Time	Notes
	Takehiro Harusaki	def.	Atsushi Takeuchi	Decision (Split)	3	5:00
	Tomonori Taniguchi	def.	Yohei Suzuki	KO (Punches)	2	2:41
	Junya Kodo	def.	Atsushi Asano	TKO (Doctor Stoppage)	2	3:21
	Takehiro Ishii	def.	Hiroyuki Ikeda	Decision (Unanimous)	2	5:00
	Kenji Hosoya	def.	Yosuke Ebihara	Decision (Majority)	2	5:00
	Hiroharu Matsufuji	def.	Joji Shimada	Submission (Kimura)	2	3:40
	Kyoko Takabayashi	def.	Masako Yoshida	Submission (Rear-Naked Choke)	1	1:57
	Mizuho Sato	def.	Kinuka Sasaki	Decision (Majority)	2	5:00

== Shooto: Shooting Disco 1: Saturday Night Hero ==
Shooto: Shooting Disco 1: Saturday Night Hero was an event held on June 2, 2007, at Yoyogi National Gymnasium in Tokyo, Japan.

=== Results ===
Main Card
Weight class				Method	Round	Time	Notes
	Mamoru Yamaguchi	def.	Yusei Shimokawa	Decision (Unanimous)	3	5:00
	Masaaki Sugawara	def.	Toshimichi Akagi	TKO (Punches)	1	4:27
	Komei Okada	def.	Shinobu Miura	Decision (Majority)	2	5:00
	Masatoshi Kobayashi	def.	Yuji Inoue	Decision (Majority)	2	5:00
	Takahiro Hosoi	def.	Naoki Yahagi	Decision (Unanimous)	2	5:00
	Shintaro Ishiwatari	def.	Toshihiko Yokoyama	TKO (Punches)	1	2:45
	Hiroshi Shiba	def.	Guy Delumeau	Submission (Triangle Choke)	1	1:58

== Shooto 2007: 6/30 in Kitazawa Town Hall ==
Shooto 2007: 6/30 in Kitazawa Town Hall was an event held on June 30, 2007, at Yoyogi National Gymnasium in Tokyo, Japan.

=== Results ===
Main Card
Weight class				Method	Round	Time	Notes
	Ryuichi Miki	def.	Shinichi Hanawa	Decision (Unanimous)	2	5:00
	Sakae Kasuya	def.	Daisuke Matsumoto	TKO (Doctor Stoppage)	1	0:57
	Takeshi Sato	def.	Katsuhisa Akasaki	Decision (Majority)	2	5:00
	Katsuya Murofushi	def.	Tomohiko Yoshida	Decision (Unanimous)	2	5:00
	Hiromasa Ougikubo	def.	Satoru Ota	Decision (Unanimous)	2	5:00
	Hiroyuki Abe	def.	Noboru Tahara	Technical Decision (Unanimous)	2	0:42
	Hiroki Sato	def.	Tsuneyoshi Kashimura	Decision (Unanimous)	2	5:00
	Hideru Inoue	def.	Hiroshi Sakamoto	Decision (Unanimous)	2	5:00

== Shooto: Back To Our Roots 4 ==
Shooto: Back To Our Roots 4 was an event held on July 15, 2007, at Yoyogi National Gymnasium in Tokyo, Japan.

=== Results ===
Main Card
Weight class				Method	Round	Time	Notes
Middleweight	Siyar Bahadurzada	def.	Shiko Yamashita	Decision (Unanimous)	3	5:00	(Note: For the Middleweight Championship.)
	Shinichi Kojima	def.	Yasuhiro Akagi	TKO (Cut)	3	3:36
	Takashi Nakakura	def.	Jani Lax	Submission (Achilles Lock)	1	2:54
	Takeshi Inoue	def.	Marc Duncan	Submission (Rear-Naked Choke)	1	3:16
	Masakatsu Ueda	vs.	Takeya Mizugaki	Draw	3	5:00
	Yuki Shojo	def.	Masatoshi Abe	Submission (Guillotine Choke)	2	3:33
	Keisuke Yamada	def.	Kyotaro Nakao	Decision (Unanimous)	2	5:00
	Tomonori Taniguchi	def.	Naohiro Mizuno	TKO (Eye Injury)	1	3:53
	Junji Ito	def.	Takahisa Toyoshima	TKO (Punches)	1	0:53

== Shooto: Battle Mix Tokyo 4 ==
Shooto: Battle Mix Tokyo 4 was an event held on July 20, 2007, at Yoyogi National Gymnasium in Tokyo, Japan.

=== Results ===
Main Card
Weight class				Method	Round	Time	Notes
	Rambaa Somdet	def.	Takehiro Harusaki	Decision (Unanimous)	3	5:00
	Shinji Sasaki	def.	Komei Okada	Submission (Triangle Choke)	2	2:03
	Paolo Milano	def.	Takayuki Okochi	Submission (Guillotine Choke)	1	0:16
	Junya Kodo	vs.	Seiji Ozuka	Draw	2	5:00
	Yuta Nezu	def.	Atsushi Asano	Decision (Unanimous)	2	5:00
	Sachiko Yamamoto	def.	Yukiko Seki	Decision (Unanimous)	2	5:00

== Shooto: Shooting Disco 2: The Heat Rises Tonight ==
Shooto: Shooting Disco 2: The Heat Rises Tonight was an event held on August 5, 2007, at Yoyogi National Gymnasium in Tokyo, Japan.

=== Results ===
Main Card
Weight class				Method	Round	Time	Notes
	Ganjo Tentsuku	def.	Mizuto Hirota	Decision (Unanimous)	3	5:00
	So Tazawa	vs.	Tetsu Suzuki	Draw	3	5:00
	Akihiro Murayama	def.	Akihiko Adachi	Submission (Armbar)	2	2:29
	Ayumu Shioda	def.	Yosuke Ebihara	Submission (Rear Naked Choke)	2	1:36
	Shintaro Ishiwatari	vs.	Hiroshi Nakamura	Draw	2	5:00
	Ryuichi Miki	vs.	Takeshi Sato	Draw	2	5:00
	Nobuhiro Hayakawa	def.	Yoshihiko Oyama	Submission (Rear Naked Choke)	2	0:37
	Takumi Ota	def.	Hideki Nishino	Submission (Rear Naked Choke)	2	3:37

== Shooto: Gig North 1 ==
Shooto: Gig North 1 was an event held on September 2, 2007, at Yoyogi National Gymnasium in Tokyo, Japan.

=== Results ===
Main Card
Weight class				Method	Round	Time	Notes
	Takuya Mori	def.	Hiroaki Yoshioka	Decision (Unanimous)	2	5:00
	Makoto Maeda	def.	Mitsuhiro Takeda	Decision (Unanimous)	2	5:00
	Yutaka Ueda	def.	Michiyuki Ishibashi	Decision (Unanimous)	2	5:00
	Hiroshi Shiba	def.	Hidekazu Asakura	Decision (Majority)	2	5:00
	Hiroyuki Ikeda	def.	Tatsuya Yamamoto	TKO (Punches)	1	4:10
	Fumihiro Kitahara	def.	Keisuke Kurata	Submission (Guillotine Choke)	1	1:58

== Shooto: Back To Our Roots 5 ==
Shooto: Back To Our Roots 5 was an event held on September 22, 2007, at Yoyogi National Gymnasium in Tokyo, Japan.

=== Results ===
Main Card
Weight class				Method	Round	Time	Notes
	Yasuhiro Urushitani	def.	Mamoru Yamaguchi	Decision (Unanimous)	3	5:00
	Daniel Lima	def.	Kenji Osawa	Decision (Split)	3	5:00
	Hideki Kadowaki	def.	Rumina Sato	Submission (Rear-Naked Choke)	1	4:09
	Atsushi Yamamoto	def.	Tetsu Suzuki	Decision (Unanimous)	3	5:00
	Setsu Iguchi	def.	Jin Akimoto	Decision (Majority)	3	5:00
	Shinya Murofushi	def.	Atsushi Takeuchi	Decision (Split)	2	5:00
	Takumi Ota	def.	Sakae Kasuya	TKO (Punches)	1	0:59
	Hiromasa Ougikubo	def.	Kazuya Tamura	Submission (Rear-Naked Choke)	1	3:43
	Akihiro Yamazaki	def.	Daisuke Okumiya	Decision (Unanimous)	2	5:00

== Shooto: Gig West 8 ==
Shooto: Gig West 8 was an event held on September 29, 2007, at Yoyogi National Gymnasium in Tokyo, Japan.

=== Results ===
Main Card
Weight class				Method	Round	Time	Notes
	Yasuhiro Kanayama	vs.	Junya Kodo	Draw	2	5:00
	Hirosumi Sugiura	def.	Toru Ishinaka	Decision (Unanimous)	2	5:00
	Teruyuki Matsumoto	def.	Kosuke Eda	Decision (Unanimous)	2	5:00
	Tatsuro Kamei	def.	Hideru Inoue	Submission (Triangle Choke)	1	2:18
	Kazuhiro Ito	def.	Toshihiko Yokoyama	KO (Knee)	1	0:32

== Shooto: Gig Central 13 ==
Shooto: Gig Central 13 was an event held on October 8, 2007, at Yoyogi National Gymnasium in Tokyo, Japan.

=== Results ===
Main Card
Weight class				Method	Round	Time	Notes
	Jong Man Kim	def.	Hatsu Hioki	Decision (Split)	3	5:00
	Yoshitaro Niimi	def.	Keisuke Sakai	Decision (Unanimous)	2	5:00
	Shinichi Hanawa	def.	Hiroshi Sakamoto	Decision (Unanimous)	2	5:00
	Tomokazu Yuasa	def.	Toshihiko Sugimoto	Decision (Unanimous)	2	5:00
	Takasuke Kume	def.	Takuya Sato	Submission (Rear-Naked Choke)	1	1:11

== Shooto: Shooting Disco 3: Everybody Fight Now ==
Shooto: Shooting Disco 3: Everybody Fight Now was an event held on October 20, 2007, at Yoyogi National Gymnasium in Tokyo, Japan.

=== Results ===
Main Card
Weight class				Method	Round	Time	Notes
	Yuki Shojo	def.	Junji Ikoma	Decision (Unanimous)	2	5:00
	Akihiro Murayama	def.	Makoto Maeda	TKO (Punches)	1	3:57
	Ryuichi Miki	def.	Toshimichi Akagi	Decision (Unanimous)	2	5:00
	Komei Okada	def.	Kunio Nakajima	Submission (Kimura)	1	2:26
	Hiroshi Nakamura	def.	Yuji Inoue	Decision (Unanimous)	2	5:00
	Kenichi Sawada	def.	Takehiro Ishii	Decision (Unanimous)	2	5:00
	Yuta Nezu	def.	Takahiro Hosoi	Decision (Split)	2	5:00
	Hiroyuki Abe	def.	Tomohiko Yoshida	Submission (Rear Naked Choke)	2	4:11
	Shinobu Miura	def.	Guy Delumeau	Decision (Majority)	2	5:00
	Noboru Tahara	def.	Junji Ito	Decision (Unanimous)	2	5:00
	Hiroki Sato	def.	Atsushi Matsuki	KO (Punch)	1	2:05

== Shooto: Back To Our Roots 6 ==
Shooto: Back To Our Roots 6 was an event held on November 8, 2007, at Yoyogi National Gymnasium in Tokyo, Japan.

=== Results ===
Main Card
Weight class				Method	Round	Time	Notes
	Takeshi Inoue	def.	Katsuya Toida	Decision (Unanimous)	3	5:00
	Takashi Nakakura	def.	Yusuke Endo	Decision (Unanimous)	3	5:00
	Hiroyuki Takaya	def.	Antonio Carvalho	TKO (Knees and Punches)	3	1:58
	Eiji Mitsuoka	def.	Joachim Hansen	Decision (Majority)	3	5:00
	Eduardo Dantas	def.	Shinichi Kojima	Decision (Unanimous)	3	5:00
	Megumi Fujii	def.	Kyoko Takabayashi	Decision (Unanimous)	2	5:00
	Rambaa Somdet	def.	Masaaki Sugawara	TKO (Doctor Stoppage)	2	5:00
	Leandro Silva	def.	Masashi Yozen	Decision (Unanimous)	3	5:00
	Shintaro Ishiwatari	def.	Hayate Usui	Decision (Unanimous)	2	5:00

== Shooto: Rookie Tournament 2007 Final ==
Shooto: Rookie Tournament 2007 Final was an event held on December 8, 2007, at Yoyogi National Gymnasium in Tokyo, Japan.

=== Results ===
Main Card
Weight class				Method	Round	Time	Notes
	Masakatsu Ueda	def.	Tetsu Suzuki	Decision (Unanimous)	3	5:00
	Taisuke Okuno	def.	Hirosumi Sugiura	TKO (Doctor Stoppage)	1	4:42
	Paolo Milano	def.	Komei Okada	Decision (Unanimous)	2	5:00
	Hiroshi Nakamura	def.	Kyotaro Nakao	Decision (Unanimous)	2	5:00
	Akihiro Yamazaki	def.	Tomokazu Yuasa	TKO (Punches and Knees)	2	0:54
	Hiromasa Ougikubo	def.	Yasuhiro Kanayama	Submission (Rear-Naked Choke)	2	3:35
	Hiroyuki Ikeda	def.	Hiroyuki Abe	KO (Upkick)	2	1:25
	Kazuhiro Ito	def.	Tomonori Taniguchi	TKO (Doctor Stoppage)	1	3:25
	Kenji Hosoya	def.	Tatsuro Kamei	Decision (Unanimous)	2	5:00
	Hiroki Sato	def.	Takaaki Oban	Submission (Kimura)	1	1:17

== See also ==
- Shooto
- List of Shooto champions
- List of Shooto Events
