= Wataru Miki =

Japanese mixed martial arts fighter

Wataru Miki 美木航
- Born: August 26, 1980 (age 46); Japan
- Nationality: Japanese
- Height: 5 ft 9 in (1.75 m)
- Weight: 143 lb (65 kg; 10.2 st)
- Division: Featherweight; Lightweight
- Style: Wrestling
- Team: Natural9
- Years active: 2001–2015

Mixed martial arts record
- Total: 43
- Wins: 23
- By knockout: 6
- By submission: 7
- By decision: 10
- Losses: 14
- By submission: 3
- By decision: 11
- Draws: 6

Other information
- Mixed martial arts record from Sherdog

Wataru Miki Japanese: 美木航 (born August 26, 1980) is a Japanese mixed martial artist. He competed in the Featherweight and Lightweight divisions.

== Mixed martial arts record ==
Professional record breakdown
43 matches	23 wins	14 losses
By knockout	6	0
By submission	7	3
By decision	10	11
Draws	6	

Res.	Record	Opponent	Method	Event	Date	Round	Time	Location	Notes
Win	23–14–6	Yuki Kondo	Decision (Unanimous)	Pancrase 340	December 24, 2023	3	5:00	Yokohama, Japan	Catchweight (158 lb) bout.
Draw	22–14–6	Jin Aoi	Draw (majority)	Mobstyles: Fight and Mosh	April 23, 2016	2	5:00	Urayasu, Japan	
Win	22–14–5	Keiichiro	TKO (doctor stoppage)	VTJ in Okinawa	October 3, 2015	1	2:56	Naha, Japan	Return to Featherweight.
Loss	21–14–5	Shigeki Osawa	Decision (Unanimous)	Shooto: 1st Round 2015	January 25, 2015	3	5:00	Tokyo, Japan	
Loss	21–13–5	Takumi Nakayama	Submission (Rear-Naked Choke)	Vale Tudo Japan: VTJ 5th in Osaka	June 28, 2014	2	2:29	Osaka, Japan	
Loss	21–12–5	Jae Woong Kim	Decision (Unanimous)	Vale Tudo Japan: VTJ 4th	February 23, 2014	3	5:00	Ota, Tokyo, Japan	
Win	21–11–5	Jung Gyeong Lee	Submission (Rear-Naked Choke)	Shooto: 1st Round 2013	January 20, 2013	2	2:57	Tokyo, Japan	
Loss	20–11–5	Yusuke Yachi	Decision (Unanimous)	Shooto: 12th Round	November 11, 2012	3	5:00	Tokyo, Japan	
Win	20–10–5	Yoshifumi Nakamura	Decision (Split)	Shooto: 5th Round	May 18, 2012	3	5:00	Tokyo, Japan	
Draw	19–10–5	Guy Delumeau	Draw (Split)	Shooto: Survivor Tournament Final	January 8, 2012	3	5:00	Tokyo, Japan	
Draw	19–10–4	Tenkei Oda	Draw (Split)	Shooto: Shooto the Shoot 2011	November 5, 2011	3	5:00	Tokyo, Japan	
Win	19–10–3	Ikuo Usuda	Submission (Rear-Naked Choke)	Shooto: Shootor's Legacy 3	July 18, 2011	3	2:20	Tokyo, Japan	
Win	18–10–3	Takayoshi Ono	Submission (Inverted Triangle Armbar)	Shooto: Shootor's Legacy 2	April 1, 2011	2	4:06	Tokyo, Japan	
Draw	17–10–3	Guy Delumeau	Draw	Shooto: Gig Tokyo 5	August 7, 2010	2	5:00	Tokyo, Japan	
Loss	17–10–2	Shintaro Ishiwatari	Decision (Majority)	Shooto: The Way of Shooto 3: Like a Tiger, Like a Dragon	May 30, 2010	2	5:00	Tokyo, Japan	
Win	17–9–2	Jin Suk Jung	KO (Knee to the Body)	Shooto: The Way of Shooto 1: Like a Tiger, Like a Dragon	January 23, 2010	1	3:15	Tokyo, Japan	
Win	16–9–2	Tomonori Taniguchi	Submission (Rear-Naked Choke)	GCM: Cage Force 12	September 12, 2009	3	4:36	Tokyo, Japan	
Loss	15–9–2	Hiroshi Nakamura	Decision (Majority)	GCM: Cage Force 10	April 25, 2009	3	5:00	Tokyo, Japan	
Win	15–8–2	Masaaki Hasegawa	Submission (Armbar)	GCM: Cage Force 9	December 6, 2008	3	1:40	Tokyo, Japan	
Win	14–8–2	Tomohiko Hori	Decision (overturned by promoter)	GCM: Cage Force 8	September 27, 2008	3	5:00	Tokyo, Japan	
Win	13–8–2	Tetsuo Uehata	TKO (Punches)	GCM: Demolition 080721	July 21, 2008	1	2:28	Japan	
Loss	12–8–2	Yoshihiro Koyama	Decision (Unanimous)	GCM: Cage Force 6	April 5, 2008	3	5:00	Tokyo, Japan	
Win	12–7–2	Kiyonobu Nishikata	Decision (Unanimous)	GCM: Cage Force EX Eastern Bound	November 11, 2007	2	5:00		
Loss	11–7–2	Jadamba Narantungalag	Decision (Unanimous)	IMPERIAL: Imperial	September 19, 2007	2	5:00	Ulan Bator, Mongolia	
Loss	11–6–2	Artur Oumakhanov	Decision (Split)	GCM: Cage Force 3	June 9, 2007	3	5:00	Tokyo, Japan	
Win	11–5–2	Yasunori Kanehara	TKO (Doctor Stoppage)	GCM: Cage Force EX Western Bound	February 17, 2007	2	1:21	Tottori, Japan	
Win	10–5–2	Yoshinori Ikeda	Decision (Unanimous)	GCM: Cage Force 1	November 25, 2006	2	5:00	Tokyo, Japan	
Draw	9–5–2	Koji Yoshida	Draw	GCM: D.O.G. 7	September 9, 2006	2	5:00	Tokyo, Japan	
Win	9–5–1	Yasunori Kanehara	Decision (Majority)	GCM: D.O.G. 6	June 11, 2006	2	5:00	Tokyo, Japan	
Win	8–5–1	Hiromitsu Bito	Submission (Kimura)	GCM: Demolition 060320	March 20, 2006	2	3:37	Japan	
Win	7–5–1	Komei Okada	Decision (Unanimous)	Shooto: 12/17 in Shinjuku Face	December 17, 2005	2	5:00	Tokyo, Japan	
Win	6–5–1	Evaldo Santos	TKO (Knees)	GCM: Demolition 051027	October 27, 2005	1	1:59	Japan	
Loss	5–5–1	Tomonari Kanomata	Decision (Unanimous)	Shooto: 9/23 in Korakuen Hall	September 23, 2005	2	5:00	Tokyo, Japan	
Win	5–4–1	Yuki Takaya	Submission (Kimura)	GCM: Demolition 050727	July 27, 2005	2	3:01	Tokyo, Japan	
Win	4–4–1	Takahiro Kajita	Decision (Split)	Shooto: 2/6 in Kitazawa Town Hall	February 6, 2005	2	5:00	Setagaya, Tokyo, Japan	
Win	3–4–1	Ken Omatsu	Decision (Unanimous)	Shooto 2004: 10/17 in Osaka Prefectural Gymnasium	October 17, 2004	2	5:00	Osaka, Kansai, Japan	
Loss	2–4–1	Kabuto Kokage	Decision (Unanimous)	Shooto 2004: 7/4 in Kitazawa Town Hall	July 4, 2004	2	5:00	Setagaya, Tokyo, Japan	
Loss	2–3–1	Koji Takeuchi	Submission (Armbar)	Shooto 2004: 4/16 in Kitazawa Town Hall	April 16, 2004	1	4:11	Setagaya, Tokyo, Japan	
Win	2–2–1	Hirotaka Tomiyama	TKO (Punches)	GCM: Demolition Atom 5	February 22, 2004	2	2:26	Tokyo, Japan	
Win	1–2–1	Junpei Chikano	Decision (Unanimous)	GCM: Demolition Atom 4	November 19, 2003	2	5:00	Shibuya, Japan	
Draw	0–2–1	Tashiro Nishiuchi	Draw	GCM: Demolition 030923	September 23, 2003	2	5:00	Japan	
Loss	0–2	Ken Yasuda	Decision (40-37)	GCM: ORG 3rd	June 16, 2002	2	5:00	Tokyo, Japan	
Loss	0–1	Shinya Sato	Submission (armbar)	Deep: 3rd Impact	December 23, 2001	2	3:28	Tokyo, Japan	

== See also ==
- List of male mixed martial artists
