= Michinori Tanaka =

Japanese mixed martial artist

- Born: October 4, 1990 (age 36); Yokohama, Kanagawa, Japan
- Nationality: Japanese
- Height: 5 ft 5 in (165 cm)
- Weight: 135 lb (61 kg; 9 st 9 lb)
- Division: Bantamweight (135 lb)
- Reach: 67 1/2 in (171 cm)
- Fighting out of: Yokohama, Kanagawa, Japan
- Team: Reversal Gym Yokohama Ground Slam (2009–2014); Team Alpha Male (2015–present)
- Rank: 2nd degree black belt in Judo
- Years active: 2010–present

Mixed martial arts record
- Total: 20
- Wins: 16
- By submission: 6
- By decision: 10
- Losses: 4
- By decision: 4

Other information
- Notable school: Yokosuka Gakuin High School
- Mixed martial arts record from Sherdog

Michinori Tanaka (田中 路教, Tanaka Michinori; born October 4, 1990) is a Japanese mixed martial artist who competes in the bantamweight division of the Legacy Fighting Alliance. A professional mixed martial artist since 2010, Tanaka has also competed in the Ultimate Fighting Championship.

== Mixed martial arts career ==
=== Shooto ===
Tanaka started his professional career in 2010. Until the first half of 2012, he fought only for Shooto, where he won the 2011 rookie 132-pound tournament.

=== Pacific Xtreme Combat ===
Tanaka faced Crisanto Pitpitunge on May 18, 2013, at PXC 37 for the bantamweight title. He won the title via unanimous decision after five rounds.

Tanaka defended his title against Kyle Aguon on October 25, 2013, at PXC 40. He defeated Aguon via unanimous decision over five rounds.

=== Ultimate Fighting Championship ===
In February 2014, it was announced that Tanaka has signed a contract with the Ultimate Fighting Championship.

In his debut, Tanaka faced Roland Delorme on June 14, 2014, at UFC 174. He won the fight via unanimous decision.

Tanaka faced Kang Kyung-ho on September 20, 2014, at UFC Fight Night 52. He lost the fight via split decision. Despite the loss on the scorecards, Tanaka was awarded his first Fight of the Night bonus award. Subsequently, Tanaka had his bonus award rescinded and in turn, was suspended for nine months after testing positive for banned substances during his post fight drug screening.

Tanaka was briefly linked to a bout with Russell Doane on January 2, 2016, at UFC 195. However, Doane was forced from the bout with injury and replaced by Joe Soto. He won the fight by split decision.

Tanaka next faced Rani Yahya on September 24, 2016, at UFC Fight Night 95. He lost the fight via unanimous decision.

Tanaka faced promotional newcomer Ricardo Ramos on February 4, 2017, at UFC Fight Night 104. He lost the fight by unanimous decision.

In May 2017, Tanaka was released from the company.

=== Post-UFC career ===
In January 2018, it was announced that Tanaka has signed a contract with the Absolute Championship Berkut.

After two winning bouts in his native Japan, Tanaka signed a multi-fight contract with Legacy Fighting Alliance in April 2020. Tanaka is expected to make his promotional debut by headlining LFA 117 against Ricardo Dias on November 5, 2021. He won the fight via unanimous decision.

Tanaka faced Ary Farias at LFA 138 on August 5, 2022. He lost the fight by split decision. Two judges scored the fight 29–28 for Farias, while the third judge awarded an identical scorecard to Tanaka.

Tanaka rebounded against Kunihisa Sasa on April 30, 2023, at Pancrase 333, winning the bout via unanimous decision.

Tanaka next faced Sindile Manengela on July 9, 2023, at Pancrase 336, winning the bout via unanimous decision.

== Championships and accomplishments ==
=== Mixed martial arts ===
- Ultimate Fighting Championship
  - Fight of the Night (One time) vs. Kang Kyung-Ho
- Pacific Xtreme Combat
  - PXC bantamweight title (one time; former)
    - One successful title defense
- Shooto
  - Shooto rookie 132 lb champion (2011)
  - Shooto rookie MVP award (2011)

== Mixed martial arts record ==
Professional record breakdown
| 20 matches | 16 wins | 4 losses |
| By knockout | 0 | 0 |
| By submission | 6 | 0 |
| By decision | 10 | 4 |

| Res. | Record | Opponent | Method | Event | Date | Round | Time | Location | Notes |
|---|---|---|---|---|---|---|---|---|---|
| Win | 16–4 | Sindile Manengela | Decision (unanimous) | Pancrase 336 | July 9, 2023 | 3 | 5:00 | Tokyo, Japan | |
| Win | 15–4 | Kunihisa Sasa | Decision (unanimous) | Pancrase 333 | April 30, 2023 | 3 | 5:00 | Tachikawa, Japan | |
| Loss | 14–4 | Ary Farias | Decision (split) | LFA 138 | August 5, 2022 | 3 | 5:00 | Shawnee, Oklahoma, United States | |
| Win | 14–3 | Ricardo Dias | Decision (unanimous) | LFA 117 | November 5, 2021 | 3 | 5:00 | Visalia, California, United States | |
| Win | 13–3 | Vladimir Leontyev | Decision (unanimous) | Pancrase 303 | March 17, 2019 | 3 | 5:00 | Tokyo, Japan | |
| Win | 12–3 | Rogério Bontorin | Submission (rear-naked choke) | Grandslam 6: Way of the Cage | October 29, 2017 | 3 | 2:27 | Tokyo, Japan | |
| Loss | 11–3 | Ricardo Ramos | Decision (unanimous) | UFC Fight Night: Bermudez vs. The Korean Zombie | February 4, 2017 | 3 | 5:00 | Houston, Texas, United States | |
| Loss | 11–2 | Rani Yahya | Decision (unanimous) | UFC Fight Night: Cyborg vs. Länsberg | September 24, 2016 | 3 | 5:00 | Brasília, Brazil | |
| Win | 11–1 | Joe Soto | Decision (split) | UFC 195 | January 2, 2016 | 3 | 5:00 | Las Vegas, Nevada, United States | |
| Loss | 10–1 | Kang Kyung-ho | Decision (split) | UFC Fight Night: Hunt vs. Nelson | September 20, 2014 | 3 | 5:00 | Saitama, Japan | Tanaka tested positive for banned substances. Fight of the Night forfeited. |
| Win | 10–0 | Roland Delorme | Decision (unanimous) | UFC 174 | June 14, 2014 | 3 | 5:00 | Vancouver, British Columbia, Canada | |
| Win | 9–0 | Kyle Aguon | Decision (unanimous) | Pacific Xtreme Combat 40 | October 25, 2013 | 5 | 5:00 | Mangilao, Guam | Defended the PXC Bantamweight Championship. |
| Win | 8–0 | Crisanto Pitpitunge | Decision (unanimous) | Pacific Xtreme Combat 37 | May 18, 2013 | 5 | 5:00 | Pasig, Philippines | Won the PXC Bantamweight Championship. |
| Win | 7–0 | Caleb Vallotton | Submission (triangle choke) | Pacific Xtreme Combat 36 | March 8, 2013 | 2 | 2:39 | Mangilao, Guam | |
| Win | 6–0 | Russell Doane | Submission (rear-naked choke) | Pacific Xtreme Combat 34 | November 17, 2012 | 3 | 2:09 | Quezon City, Philippines | |
| Win | 5–0 | Jong Hoon Choi | Submission (rear-naked choke) | Shooto: 3rd Round | March 10, 2012 | 1 | 3:29 | Tokyo, Japan | |
| Win | 4–0 | Teruto Ishihara | Decision (unanimous) | Shooto: The Rookie Tournament 2011 Final | December 18, 2011 | 2 | 5:00 | Tokyo, Japan | Won the 2011 Shooto Rookie 132 lbs Championship. |
| Win | 3–0 | Takuya Ogura | Submission (triangle choke) | Shooto: Gig Tokyo 7 | August 6, 2011 | 1 | 3:09 | Tokyo, Japan | |
| Win | 2–0 | Hiroshi Roppongi | Technical Submission (armbar) | Shooto: Gig Saitama 3 | April 10, 2011 | 2 | 1:29 | Fujimi, Japan | |
| Win | 1–0 | Yasutaka Hamaji | Decision (unanimous) | Shooto: Shooting Disco 13: Can't Stop Myself! | October 16, 2010 | 2 | 5:00 | Tokyo, Japan | |

== See also ==
- List of current UFC fighters
- List of male mixed martial artists
