= Akihiro Murayama =

Japanese mixed martial artist

Akihiro Murayama 村山暁弘
- Born: March 29, 1980 (age 46); Matsumoto, Nagano, Japan
- Nationality: Japanese
- Height: 5 ft 10 in (1.78 m)
- Weight: 170 lb (77 kg; 12 st)
- Division: Light Heavyweight; Middleweight; Welterweight
- Fighting out of: Matsumoto, Nagano, Japan
- Team: GUTSMAN
- Years active: 2003–present

Mixed martial arts record
- Total: 50
- Wins: 25
- By knockout: 6
- By submission: 6
- By decision: 13
- Losses: 16
- By knockout: 5
- By decision: 11
- Draws: 9

Other information
- University: Tokyo University of Science
- Mixed martial arts record from Sherdog

Akihiro Murayama (Japanese: 村山 暁洋, Murayama Akihiro; born March 29, 1980) is a Japanese mixed martial artist who has competed mainly for Pancrase, Shooto and Greatest Common Multiple.

== Mixed martial arts career ==
=== Early career ===
Murayama started his professional career in 2003. In his first years, he fought mainly for Greatest Common Multiple, also known as GCM, but in 2005 he transitioned to Shooto and remained there until 2008.

With a professional record of nine victories, two defeats and four draws, Murayama returned to the GCM, this time to fight in Cage Force.

=== Cage Force ===
Murayama wasn't successful in Cage Force. Under the promotion's banner, he amassed two losses and one draw. Counting his loss against Yoichiro Sato at Shooto: Shooting Disco 9, he stood with a total record of nine victories, five defeats and five draws.

In the second half of 2010, Murayama returned to Shooto.

=== Shooto Pacific Rim title ===
Murayama had a rematch against Yoichiro Sato on February 26, 2011, at Shooto: Shooting Disco 14 for the Shooto Pacific Rim middleweight (168 lb) title. Sato retained the title, as the judges ruled the match a draw (29–28 Murayama, 29–28 Sato, 29–29).

Murayama faced Sato a third time — and once again for the title — on June 11, 2011, at Shooto: Shooting Disco 15. This time Murayama won via unanimous decision (30–27, 30–27, 30–27) and became the new Shooto Pacific Rim 168–pound champion.

Murayama faced Sengoku welterweight champion and former Shooto Pacific Rim middleweight champion Keita Nakamura on September 23, 2011, at Shooto: Shootor's Legacy 4 in a non–title bout. He defeated Nakamura via submission due to a rear-naked choke in the very first round.

=== Pancrase ===
Murayama faced welterweight King of Pancrase Takenori Sato on March 17, 2013, at Pancrase 246. The match was ruled a draw.

Murayama faced longtime mixed martial arts veteran Yuki Kondo on June 30, 2013, at Pancrase 248. Murayama defeated Kondo via unanimous decision.

Murayama faced Gota Yamashita on August 10, 2014, at Pancrase 260 for the vacant welterweight King of Pancrase title. Yamashita lost via unanimous decision after three rounds.

==== Welterweight King of Pancrase ====
After racking up three straight wins in Pancrase, Murayama challenged Shingo Suzuki for the Welterweight King of Pancrase at Pancrase 276 on March 12, 2016. He won the fight via fourth-round technical knockout and claimed the championship.

As his first title defense attempt, Murayama faced Hiromitsu Miura at Pancrase 281 on October 2, 2016. He lost the fight and championship via unanimous decision.

==== Post-title reign ====
After losing his title, Murayama faced Takashi Sato at Pancrase 292 on December 10, 2017. He lost the fight via first-round technical knockout.

Muarayama then faced Takaaki Nara at Pancrase 296 on May 20, 2018. He won the fight via first-minute technical submission.

Murayama faced Hiroyuki Tetsuka at Pancrase 302 on December 9, 2018. He lost the bout via unanimous decision.

Murayama then fought Yuki Kondo at Pancrase 312 on February 16, 2020, winning the fight via unanimous decision.

Murayama next faced Masayuki Kikuiri at Pancrase 320 on December 13, 2020. Murayama won the bout via unanimous decision.

Murayama and Kikuiri were then scheduled for a rematch for the interim Welterweight King of Pancrase title at Pancrase 324 on October 17, 2021. Kikuiri won the bout via unanimous decision.

Murayama then faced Yusaku Kinoshita at Pancrase 327 on April 29, 2022. He lost the fight via first-round knockout.

At Pancrase 330 on December 25, 2022, Murayama faced Hiroki Nagaoka. He won the bout via unanimous decision.

Murayama then faced Genpei Hayashi for the vacant Welterweight King of Pancrase title at Pancrase 334 on June 4, 2023. He lost the bout via unanimous decision.

== Championships and accomplishments ==
=== Mixed martial arts ===
- Shooto
  - Shooto Pacific Rim 168 lb title (one time)
- Pancrase
  - Welterweight King of Pancrase (One time; former)

== Mixed martial arts record ==
Professional record breakdown
50 matches	25 wins	16 losses
By knockout	6	5
By submission	6	0
By decision	13	11
Draws	9	

Res.	Record	Opponent	Method	Event	Date	Round	Time	Location	Notes
Loss	25–16–9	Akira Hirata	TKO (elbows)	Pancrase 365	September 6, 2026	13	1:44	Tachikawa, Japan	
Loss	25–15–9	Spike Carlyle	TKO (punches)	Pancrase 357	September 23, 2025	1	2:07	Tokyo, Japan	
Win	25–14–9	Hiroki Nagaoka	Decision (unanimous)	Pancrase 352	March 8, 2025	3	5:00	Yokohama, Japan	
Win	24–14–9	Takahiro Kawanaka	Decision (unanimous)	Pancrase 349	November 10, 2024	3	5:00	Tokyo, Japan	
Loss	23–14–9	Kota Shirakawa	Decision (unanimous)	Pancrase 343	May 25, 2024	3	5:00	Tokyo, Japan	
Loss	23–13–9	Genpei Hayashi	Decision (unanimous)	Pancrase 334	June 4, 2023	5	5:00	Tokyo, Japan	For the vacant Pancrase Welterweight Championship.
Win	23–12–9	Hiroki Nagaoka	Decision (unanimous)	Pancrase 330	December 25, 2022	3	5:00	Tokyo, Japan	
Loss	22–12–9	Yusaku Kinoshita	KO (flying knee)	Pancrase 327	April 22, 2022	1	1:48	Tokyo, Japan	
Loss	22–11–9	Masayuki Kikuiri	Decision (unanimous)	Pancrase: 324	October 19, 2021	5	5:00	Tokyo, Japan	For the interim Pancrase Welterweight Championship.
Win	22–10–9	Masayuki Kikuiri	Decision (unanimous)	Pancrase 320	December 13, 2020	3	5:00	Tokyo, Japan	
Win	21–10–9	Yuki Kondo	Decision (unanimous)	Pancrase 312	February 16, 2020	3	5:00	Tokyo, Japan	
Loss	20–10–9	J.J. Ambrose	Decision (unanimous)	Pancrase 306	June 30, 2019	3	5:00	Tokyo, Japan	
Loss	20–9–9	Hiroyuki Tetsuka	Decision (unanimous)	Pancrase 302	December 9, 2018	3	5:00	Tokyo, Japan	
Win	20–8–9	Takaaki Nara	Technical Submission (rear-naked choke)	Pancrase 296	May 20, 2018	1	0:48	Tokyo, Japan	
Loss	19–8–9	Takashi Sato	TKO (punches)	Pancrase 292	December 10, 2017	1	4:15	Tokyo, Japan	
Loss	19–7–9	Hiromitsu Miura	Decision (unanimous)	Pancrase 281	October 2, 2016	5	5:00	Tokyo, Japan	Lost the Pancrase Welterweight Championship.
Win	19–6–9	Shingo Suzuki	KO (punches)	Pancrase 276	March 13, 2016	4	3:33	Tokyo, Japan	Won the Pancrase Welterweight Championship.
Win	18–6–9	Kosei Kubota	Decision (unanimous)	Pancrase 270	October 5, 2015	3	5:00	Tokyo, Japan	
Win	17–6–9	Daniel Roberts	Decision (split)	Pancrase 266	April 26, 2015	3	5:00	Tokyo, Japan	
Win	16–6–9	Shingo Suzuki	TKO (punches)	Pancrase 263	December 6, 2014	3	0:27	Tokyo, Japan	
Loss	15–6–9	Gota Yamashita	Decision (unanimous)	Pancrase 260	August 10, 2014	3	5:00	Tokyo, Japan	For the vacant Pancrase Welterweight Championship.
Win	15–5–9	Thiago Gonçalves	Decision (unanimous)	Pancrase 257	March 30, 2014	3	5:00	Yokohama, Japan	
Draw	14–5–9	Yuya Shirai	Draw (majority)	DEEP: Tribe Tokyo Fight	October 20, 2013	3	5:00	Tokyo, Japan	
Win	14–5–8	Yuki Kondo	Decision (unanimous)	Pancrase 248	June 30, 2013	3	5:00	Tokyo, Japan	
Draw	13–5–8	Takenori Sato	Draw (unanimous)	Pancrase 246	March 17, 2013	3	5:00	Tokyo, Japan	For the Pancrase Welterweight Championship.
Win	13–5–7	Yuta Nakamura	Decision (unanimous)	Pancrase 245	February 3, 2013	2	5:00	Tokyo, Japan	
Draw	12–5–7	Sojiro Orui	Draw (majority)	Pancrase: Progress Tour 9	August 5, 2012	3	5:00	Tokyo, Japan	
Win	12–5–6	Keita Nakamura	Submission (rear-naked choke)	Shooto: Shootor's Legacy 4	September 23, 2011	1	2:30	Tokyo, Japan	Non–title bout.
Win	11–5–6	Yoichiro Sato	Decision (unanimous)	Shooto: Shooting Disco 15: Try Hard, Japan!	June 11, 2011	3	5:00	Tokyo, Japan	Won the Shooto Pacific Rim 168 lb Championship.
Draw	10–5–6	Yoichiro Sato	Draw (split)	Shooto: Shooting Disco 14: 365-Step March	February 26, 2011	3	5:00	Tokyo, Japan	For Shooto Pacific Rim 168 lb Championship.
Win	10–5–5	Kang Jung-min	Submission (rear-naked choke)	Shooto: Gig Tokyo 5	August 7, 2010	1	2:30	Tokyo, Japan	
Loss	9–5–5	Kenta Takagi	KO (elbow)	GCM: Cage Force 16	April 11, 2010	1	0:48	Tokyo, Japan	
Loss	9–4–5	Yoichiro Sato	Decision (unanimous)	Shooto: Shooting Disco 9: Superman	June 6, 2009	2	5:00	Tokyo, Japan	
Draw	9–3–5	Ikkei Nagamura	Draw (unanimous)	GCM: Cage Force 10	April 25, 2009	3	3:00	Tokyo, Japan	
Loss	9–3–4	Rikuhei Fujii	Decision (unanimous)	GCM: Cage Force 7	June 22, 2008	3	5:00	Tokyo, Japan	
Win	9–2–4	Hiroki Sato	Decision (unanimous)	Shooto: Shooting Disco 4: Born in the Fighting	February 23, 2008	2	5:00	Tokyo, Japan	
Win	8–2–4	Makoto Maeda	TKO (punches)	Shooto: Shooting Disco 3: Everybody Fight Now	October 20, 2007	1	3:57	Tokyo, Japan	
Win	7–2–4	Akihiko Adachi	Submission (armbar)	Shooto: Shooting Disco 2: The Heat Rises Tonight	August 5, 2007	2	2:29	Tokyo, Japan	
Win	6–2–4	Seiji Furukawa	Submission (keylock)	Shooto 2006: It's Strong Being a Man	March 4, 2007	1	0:39	Setagaya, Tokyo, Japan	
Draw	5–2–4	Akihiko Adachi	Draw (majority)	Shooto 2006: 10/1 in Kitazawa Town Hall	October 1, 2006	2	5:00	Setagaya, Tokyo, Japan	
Draw	5–2–3	Osami Shibuya	Draw (majority)	GCM: D.O.G. 6	June 11, 2006	2	5:00	Tokyo, Japan	
Win	5–2–2	Masashi Yozen	Decision (unanimous)	Shooto: Soulful Fight	October 28, 2005	2	5:00	Setagaya, Tokyo, Japan	
Win	4–2–2	Yoshinori Ashikawa	TKO (punches)	Shooto: Shooter's Summer	July 14, 2005	1	0:25	Setagaya, Tokyo, Japan	
Win	3–2–2	Nobuyuki Shimakawa	TKO (punches)	Shooto: 6/3 in Kitazawa Town Hall	June 3, 2005	1	2:16	Setagaya, Tokyo, Japan	
Loss	2–2–2	Petras Markevicius	Decision	Shooto Lithuania: Bushido	November 20, 2004	2	5:00	Vilnius, Lithuania	
Draw	2–1–2	Wataru Takahashi	Draw (majority)	GCM: Demolition 2nd Anniversary Show	September 19, 2004	2	5:00	Tokyo, Japan	
Win	2–1–1	Dai Moriyama	TKO (corner stoppage)	GCM: Demolition 16	July 11, 2004	2	1:56	Tokyo, Japan	
Loss	1–1–1	Ryuhei Sato	Decision (unanimous)	Shooto 2004: 4/16 in Kitazawa Town Hall	April 16, 2004	2	5:00	Setagaya, Tokyo, Japan	
Draw	1–0–1	Shinpei Sotoyama	Draw (unanimous)	GCM: Demolition 12	December 27, 2003	2	5:00	Tokyo, Japan	
Win	1–0	Kenji Nagai	Submission (armbar)	GCM: Demolition 11	October 25, 2003	1	4:42	Tokyo, Japan	
