= Hiroshi Nakamura (fighter) =

Japanese martial artist

Hiroshi Nakamura 中村拓志
- Born: February 14, 1981 (age 45); Ōta, Gunma, Japan
- Other names: Iron
- Nationality: Japanese
- Height: 5 ft 5 in (1.65 m)
- Weight: 134 lb (61 kg; 9.6 st)
- Division: Bantamweight (135 lb); Featherweight (145 lb)
- Reach: 64.0 in (163 cm)
- Fighting out of: Tokyo, Japan
- Team: Carpe Diem Brazilian Jiu-Jitsu; Tokyo Yellow Mans
- Rank: Black belt in Judo
- Years active: 2005–present

Mixed martial arts record
- Total: 27
- Wins: 16
- By submission: 2
- By decision: 14
- Losses: 7
- By knockout: 5
- By decision: 2
- Draws: 4

Other information
- Mixed martial arts record from Sherdog

Hiroshi Nakamura (Japanese: 中村 浩士, Nakamura Hiroshi; born February 14, 1981) is a Japanese mixed martial artist who competes in the bantamweight division. He has fought in many well-known mixed martial arts organizations as Shooto, DEEP and Bellator.

== Mixed martial arts career ==
=== Shooto ===
Nakamura started his career in 2005. Until 2009, he fought only for Shooto and faced opponents like Shooto and Sengoku featherweight champion Hatsu Hioki, and Shooto veteran Hayate Usui.

=== DEEP ===
Between 2010 and 2011, Nakamura won five times and lost two times. He obtained a victory over the DEEP bantamweight champion Masakazu Imanari in a non-title bout, and also defeated WEC veteran and former featherweight King of Pancrase Yoshiro Maeda.

In 2011, Nakamura signed with Bellator to compete in the bantamweight tournament.

=== Bellator MMA ===
Nakamura made his debut on April 6, 2012 at Bellator 64 in the quarterfinal match of Bellator season six bantamweight tournament against Rodrigo Lima. Nakamura defeated Lima via unanimous decision (29-27, 29-27, 29-27) and advanced to the semifinals.

In the semifinals on May 25, 2012 at Bellator 70, Nakamura faced Luis Nogueira. Nakamura lost via knockout in the third round.

== Mixed martial arts record ==
Professional record breakdown
27 matches	16 wins	7 losses
By knockout	0	5
By submission	2	0
By decision	14	2
Draws	4	

Res.	Record	Opponent	Method	Event	Date	Round	Time	Location	Notes
Win	16–7–4	Tomomi Iwama	Decision (majority)	DEEP: 65 Impact	March 22, 2014	3	5:00	Tokyo, Japan	
Loss	15–7–4	Yusaku Nakamura	KO (flying knee)	Deep: Cage Impact 2013	November 24, 2013	3	0:53	Tokyo, Japan	
Loss	15–6–4	Luis Nogueira	KO (punches)	Bellator 70	May 25, 2012	3	1:58	New Orleans, Louisiana, United States	Bellator season 6 bantamweight tournament semifinal.
Win	15–5–4	Rodrigo Lima	Decision (unanimous)	Bellator 64	April 6, 2012	3	5:00	Windsor, Ontario, Canada	Bellator season 6 bantamweight tournament quarterfinal.
Win	14–5–4	Seiji Akao	Decision (unanimous)	Deep: 56 Impact	December 16, 2011	2	5:00	Tokyo, Japan	
Win	13–5–4	Yoshiro Maeda	Decision (majority)	Deep: Cage Impact 2011 in Tokyo, 2nd Round	October 29, 2011	3	5:00	Tokyo, Japan	
Loss	12–5–4	Takafumi Otsuka	Decision (unanimous)	Deep: 54 Impact	June 24, 2011	3	5:00	Tokyo, Japan	
Win	12–4–4	Masakazu Imanari	Decision (unanimous)	Deep: 52nd Impact	October 24, 2010	3	5:00	Tokyo, Japan	Non-title bout
Win	11–4–4	Tatsumitsu Wada	Decision (unanimous)	Deep: 50 Impact	October 24, 2010	2	5:00	Tokyo, Japan	
Win	10–4–4	Tomohiko Hori	Decision (unanimous)	Deep: 48 Impact	July 3, 2010	2	5:00	Tokyo, Japan	
Loss	9–4–4	Isao Terada	TKO (punches)	Deep: 46 Impact	February 28, 2010	1	1:11	Tokyo, Japan	
Win	9–3–4	Wataru Inatsu	Submission (armbar)	Zst 22	November 23, 2009	1	1:35	Tokyo, Japan	
Win	8–3–4	Kim Jong-Man	Decision (unanimous)	FMC 1: Korea vs. Japan	August 16, 2009	3	5:00	Seoul, South Korea	
Win	7–3–4	Wataru Miki	Decision (majority)	GCM: Cage Force 10	April 25, 2009	3	5:00	Tokyo, Japan	
Win	6–3–4	Hayate Usui	Decision (unanimous)	Shooto: Shooto Tradition 5	January 18, 2009	3	5:00	Tokyo, Japan	
Draw	5–3–4	Hatsu Hioki	Draw	Shooto: Gig Central 15	August 3, 2008	3	5:00	Nagoya, Aichi, Japan	
Win	5–3–3	Tenkei Oda	Decision (majority)	Shooto: Back To Our Roots 8	March 28, 2008	2	5:00	Tokyo, Japan	
Win	4–3–3	Kyotaro Nakao	Decision (unanimous)	Shooto: Rookie Tournament 2007 Final	December 8, 2007	2	5:00	Tokyo, Japan	
Win	3–3–3	Yuji Inoue	Decision (unanimous)	Shooto: Shooting Disco 3: Everybody Fight Now	October 20, 2007	2	5:00	Tokyo, Japan	
Draw	2–3–3	Shintaro Ishiwatari	Draw	Shooto: Shooting Disco 2: The Heat Rises Tonight	August 5, 2007	2	5:00	Tokyo, Japan	
Draw	2–3–2	Keisuke Yamada	Draw	Shooto: 11/10 in Korakuen Hall	November 10, 2006	2	5:00	Tokyo, Japan	
Loss	2–3–1	Daisuke Ishizawa	KO (punches)	Shooto 2006: 7/21 in Korakuen Hall	July 21, 2006	2	4:26	Tokyo, Japan	
Win	2–2–1	Hirotaka Tomiyama	Submission (armbar)	Shooto 2006: 5/28 in Kitazawa Town Hall	May 28, 2006	2	3:24	Setagaya, Tokyo, Japan	
Draw	1–2–1	Sakae Kasuya	Draw	Shooto: 3/3 in Kitazawa Town Hall	March 3, 2006	2	5:00	Setagaya, Tokyo, Japan	
Win	1–2	Seigi Fujioka	Decision (unanimous)	Shooto: Soulful Fight	October 28, 2005	2	5:00	Setagaya, Tokyo, Japan	
Loss	0–2	Akiyo Nishiura	KO (punch)	Shooto: 5/29 in Kitazawa Town Hall	May 29, 2005	2	3:57	Setagaya, Tokyo, Japan	
Loss	0–1	Yutaka Nishioka	Decision (unanimous)	Shooto: 2/6 in Kitazawa Town Hall	February 6, 2005	2	5:00	Setagaya, Tokyo, Japan	
