= Yuki Shoujou =

Japanese martial artist

- Born: Yuki Shoujou; December 12, 1980 (age 45); Kamakura
- Nationality: Japanese
- Height: 5 ft 5 in (1.65 m)
- Weight: 123 lb (56 kg; 8 st 11 lb)
- Division: Flyweight (56 kg); Strawweight
- Style: Muay Thai
- Team: X-One Gym Shonan
- Years active: 2004–present

Mixed martial arts record
- Total: 25
- Wins: 14
- By knockout: 1
- By submission: 3
- By decision: 10
- Losses: 9
- By knockout: 2
- By submission: 1
- By decision: 6
- Draws: 2

Other information
- Mixed martial arts record from Sherdog

Yuki Shoujou (正城ユウキ, Shōjō Yūki; born December 12, 1980, birthname pronounced same by written 正城悠樹) is a Japanese professional mixed martial artist. He is currently fighting in Shooto's bantamweight division, equivalent to North America's flyweight division which is 125.0 pounds (56.7 kg).

== Mixed martial arts career ==
From 2004 to 2005 he went 1-2-2 but rebounded in 2006 with three consecutive wins over Ryuichi Miki, Mamoru Okochi and Takeshi Okada. His streak ended in September when he faced Masaaki Sugawara whom he lost to by majority decision. In early 2007 Shoujou started another winning streak with a second round knockout over Ayuma Shioda before defeating Masatoshi Abe and Junji Ikoma. He then fought Mamoru Yamaguchi to whom he dropped a unanimous decision. In his next fight, at Shooto Tradition 3, Shoujou got the biggest win of his career with a guillotine-choke submission over Yasuhiro Urushitani in the third round.

=== Title shot ===
At Shooto Tradition 6 Shoujou fought Shinichi Kojima for the Shooto bantamweight title. The first round saw Shoujou being successful on the feet landing multiple kicks and combinations, while Kojima was the aggressor in the second after taking Shoujou down and landing multiple punches. The third round ended quick after Shoujou went for an unsuccessful double-leg takedown prompting Kojima to take his back where he choked him out with a rear naked choke after 0:39.

== Mixed martial arts record ==
Professional record breakdown
| 26 matches | 16 wins | 8 losses |
| By knockout | 2 | 2 |
| By submission | 3 | 1 |
| By decision | 11 | 5 |
| Draws | 2 | |

| Res. | Record | Opponent | Method | Event | Date | Round | Time | Location | Notes |
|---|---|---|---|---|---|---|---|---|---|
| Win | 15–9–2 | Takao Ueda | KO (punches) | ZST.53 | August 7, 2016 | 3 | 0:16 | Tokyo, Japan | |
| Loss | 14–9–2 | Ryuto Sawada | KO (punches) | Shooto - Gig Tokyo 18 | February 11, 2015 | 3 | 0:16 | Tokyo, Japan | |
| Win | 14–8–2 | Jun Nabeshima | Decision (unanimous) | Shooto - 7th Round 2014 | September 27, 2014 | 3 | 5:00 | Tokyo, Japan | |
| Loss | 13–8–2 | Yoshitaka Naito | Decision (unanimous) | Shooto - 2nd Round 2014 | March 16, 2014 | 3 | 5:00 | Tokyo, Japan | |
| Win | 13–7–2 | Tadaaki Yamamoto | Decision (majority) | Shooto - 12th Round | November 11, 2012 | 3 | 5:00 | Tokyo, Japan | |
| Win | 12–7–2 | Hiroyuki Abe | Decision (unanimous) | Shooto - 8th Round | July 16, 2012 | 3 | 5:00 | Tokyo, Japan | |
| Loss | 11–7–2 | Junji Ito | Decision (majority) | Shooto - 3rd Round | March 10, 2012 | 3 | 5:00 | Tokyo, Japan | |
| Loss | 11–6–2 | Yasuhiro Urushitani | TKO (head kick and punches) | Shooto - Shootor's Legacy 3 | July 18, 2011 | 2 | 0:24 | Tokyo, Japan | For Shooto Bantamweight (123 lb) Championship. |
| Win | 11–5–2 | Noboru Tahara | Decision (unanimous) | Shooto - Shooto Tradition 2011 | April 29, 2011 | 3 | 5:00 | Tokyo, Japan | |
| Win | 10–5–2 | Jesse Taitano | Decision (unanimous) | Shooto - The Way of Shooto 2: Like a Tiger, Like a Dragon | March 22, 2010 | 3 | 5:00 | Tokyo, Japan | |
| Win | 9–5–2 | Junya Kodo | Decision (majority) | Shooto - Revolutionary Exchanges 2 | September 22, 2009 | 3 | 5:00 | Tokyo, Japan | |
| Loss | 8–5–2 | Shinichi Kojima | Submission (rear-naked choke) | Shooto - Shooto Tradition 6 | March 20, 2009 | 3 | 0:38 | Tokyo, Japan | For Shooto Bantamweight (123 lb) Championship. |
| Win | 8–4–2 | Yasuhiro Urushitani | Submission (guillotine choke) | Shooto - Tradition 3 | September 28, 2008 | 3 | 3:39 | Tokyo, Japan | |
| Loss | 7–4–2 | Mamoru Yamaguchi | Decision (unanimous) | Shooto - Shooting Disco 4: Born in the Fighting | February 23, 2008 | 3 | 5:00 | Tokyo, Japan | |
| Win | 7–3–2 | Junji Ikoma | Decision (unanimous) | Shooto - Shooting Disco 3: Everybody Fights Now | October 20, 2007 | 2 | 5:00 | Tokyo, Japan | |
| Win | 6–3–2 | Masatoshi Abe | Submission (guillotine choke) | Shooto - Back To Our Roots 4 | July 15, 2007 | 1 | 1:38 | Yokohama, Japan | |
| Win | 5–3–2 | Ayumu Shioda | KO (punches) | Shooto - It's Strong Being a Man | March 4, 2007 | 2 | 0:45 | Tokyo, Japan | |
| Loss | 4–3–2 | Masaaki Sugawara | Decision (majority) | Shooto - 11/10 in Korakuen Hall | November 10, 2006 | 2 | 5:00 | Tokyo, Japan | |
| Win | 4–2–2 | Takeshi Okada | Decision (unanimous) | Shooto 2006 - 9/8 in Korakuen Hall | September 8, 2006 | 2 | 5:00 | Tokyo, Japan | |
| Win | 3–2–2 | Mamoru Okochi | Decision (unanimous) | Shooto 2006 - 5/28 in Kitazawa Town Hall | May 28, 2006 | 2 | 5:00 | Tokyo, Japan | |
| Win | 2–2–2 | Ryuichi Miki | Decision (unanimous) | Shooto - 3/3 in Kitazawa Town Hall | March 3, 2006 | 2 | 5:00 | Tokyo, Japan | |
| Loss | 1–2–2 | Yusei Shimokawa | Decision (majority) | Shooto 2005 - 11/6 in Korakuen Hall | November 6, 2005 | 2 | 5:00 | Tokyo, Japan | |
| Draw | 1–1–2 | Yutaka Tetsuka | Draw | Shooto - 9/23 in Korakuen Hall | September 23, 2005 | 2 | 5:00 | Tokyo, Japan | |
| Win | 1–1–1 | Hiroharu Matsufuji | Submission (rear-naked choke) | Shooto - 5/29 in Kitazawa Town Hal | May 29, 2005 | 2 | 1:40 | Tokyo, Japan | |
| Draw | 0–1–1 | Takehiko Hata | Draw | GCM - CanD | October 24, 2004 | 2 | 5:00 | Tokyo, Japan | |
| Loss | 0–1 | Junichi Sase | Decision (unanimous) | Shooto 2004- 1/24 in Korakuen Hall | Jan 24, 2004 | 2 | 5:00 | Tokyo, Japan | |
