= 2009 in Shooto =

Mixed martial arts events

Information
- First date: January 18, 2009
- Last date: December 23, 2009

Events
- Total events: 30

Fights
- Total fights: 224
- Title fights: 5

Chronology
| 2008 in Shooto | 2009 in Shooto | 2010 in Shooto |

The year 2009 is the 21st year in the history of Shooto, a mixed martial arts promotion based in Japan. In 2009 Shooto held 30 events beginning with, Shooto: Shooto Tradition 5.

== Title fights ==
Title fights in 2009
| Weight class | | | | Method | Round | Time | Event | Notes |
|---|---|---|---|---|---|---|---|---|
| Flyweight | Shinichi Kojima (c) | def. | Yuki Shojo | Submission (Rear-Naked Choke) | 3 | 0:38 | Shooto: Shooto Tradition 6 | (Note: For the Flyweight Championship.) |
| Bantamweight | Masakatsu Ueda (c) | def. | So Tazawa | Decision (Unanimous) | 3 | 5:00 | Shooto: Shooto Tradition 6 | (Note: For the Bantamweight Championship.) |
| Featherweight | Takeshi Inoue (c) | def. | Rumina Sato | TKO (Punches) | 1 | 4:41 | Shooto: Shooto Tradition Final | (Note: For the Featherweight Championship.) |
| Bantamweight | Masakatsu Ueda (c) | def. | Eduardo Dantas | Decision (Unanimous) | 3 | 5:00 | Shooto: Revolutionary Exchanges 1: Undefeated | (Note: For the Bantamweight Championship.) |
| Strawweight | Rambaa Somdet | def. | Noboru Tahara | Decision (Unanimous) | 3 | 5:00 | Shooto: Revolutionary Exchanges 3 | (Note: For the Strawweight Championship.) |

== Events list ==
| # | Event title | Date | Arena | Location |
|---|---|---|---|---|
| 285 | Shooto: Alternative 1 | December 23, 2009 | Sumiyoshi Community Center Hall | Osaka, Kansai, Japan |
| 284 | Shooto: The Rookie Tournament 2009 Final | December 13, 2009 | Shinjuku Face | Tokyo, Japan |
| 283 | Shooto: Grapplingman 9 | November 29, 2009 | Kitajima North Park General Fitness Center | Kitajima, Tokushima, Japan |
| 282 | Shooto: Revolutionary Exchanges 3 | November 23, 2009 | Tokyo Dome City Hall | Tokyo, Japan |
| 281 | Shooto: Gig Central 19 | October 25, 2009 | Asunal Kanayama Hall | Nagoya, Aichi, Japan |
| 280 | Shooto: Gig Tokyo 3 | October 18, 2009 | Shinjuku Face | Tokyo, Japan |
| 279 | Shooto: Border: Season 1: Clash | October 4, 2009 | Hirano Ward Community Hall | Osaka, Kansai, Japan |
| 278 | Shooto: Revolutionary Exchanges 2 | September 22, 2009 | Korakuen Hall | Tokyo, Japan |
| 277 | Shooto: Shooting Disco 10: Twist and Shooto | September 20, 2009 | Shinjuku Face | Tokyo, Japan |
| 276 | Shooto: Kitazawa Shooto 2009 Vol. 2 | September 4, 2009 | Kitazawa Town Hall | Tokyo, Japan |
| 275 | Shooto: Gig Central 18 | August 30, 2009 | Asunal Kanayama Hall | Nagoya, Aichi, Japan |
| 274 | Shooto: Border: Season 1: Advance | August 16, 2009 | Hirano Ward Community Hall | Osaka, Kansai, Japan |
| 273 | Shooto: Gig Saitama 1 | August 9, 2009 | Fujimi Culture Hall | Fujimi, Saitama, Japan |
| 272 | Shooto: Revolutionary Exchanges 1: Undefeated | July 19, 2009 | Korakuen Hall | Tokyo, Japan |
| 271 | Shooto: Gig North 4 | June 7, 2009 | Zepp Sapporo | Sapporo, Hokkaido, Japan |
| 270 | Shooto: Shooting Disco 9: Superman | June 6, 2009 | Shinjuku Face | Tokyo, Japan |
| 269 | Shooto: Spirit 2009 | May 24, 2009 | Accel Hall | Sendai, Miyagi, Japan |
| 268 | Shooto: Kitazawa Shooto 2009 Vol. 1 | May 20, 2009 | Kitazawa Town Hall | Tokyo, Japan |
| 267 | Shooto: Grapplingman 8 | May 17, 2009 | Hiroshima Industrial Hall | Hiroshima, Japan |
| 266 | Shooto: Shooto Tradition Final | May 10, 2009 | Tokyo Dome City Hall | Tokyo, Japan |
| 265 | Shooto: Gig West 11 | April 29, 2009 | Azalea Taisho Hall | Osaka, Kansai, Japan |
| 264 | Shooto: Gig Tokyo 2 | April 19, 2009 | Shinjuku Face | Tokyo, Japan |
| 263 | Shooto: Gig Central 17 | April 12, 2009 | Asunal Kanayama Hall | Nagoya, Aichi, Japan |
| 262 | Shooto: Shooting Disco 8: We Are Tarzan! | April 10, 2009 | Shinjuku Face | Tokyo, Japan |
| 261 | Shooto: Gig Torao 2 | March 22, 2009 | Fukuyama Industrial Exchange Center | Fukuyama, Hiroshima, Japan |
| 260 | Shooto: Shooto Tradition 6 | March 20, 2009 | Korakuen Hall | Tokyo, Japan |
| 259 | Shooto: Border: Season 1: Outbreak | March 8, 2009 | Hirano Ward Community Hall | Osaka, Kansai, Japan |
| 258 | Shooto: Gig Tokyo 1 | February 28, 2009 | Shinjuku Face | Tokyo, Japan |
| 257 | Shooto: Shooting Disco 7: Young Man | January 31, 2009 | Shinjuku Face | Tokyo, Japan |
| 256 | Shooto: Shooto Tradition 5 | January 18, 2009 | Differ Ariake Arena | Tokyo, Japan |

== Shooto: Shooto Tradition 5 ==
Shooto: Shooto Tradition 5 was an event held on January 18, 2009, at Differ Ariake Arena in Tokyo, Japan.

=== Results ===
Main Card
| Weight class | | | | Method | Round | Time | Notes |
|---|---|---|---|---|---|---|---|
| | Kotetsu Boku | vs. | Yusuke Endo | Draw | 3 | 5:00 |
| | Shinichi Kojima | vs. | Jesse Taitano | Draw | 2 | 5:00 |
| | Hiroshi Nakamura | def. | Hayate Usui | Decision (Unanimous) | 3 | 5:00 |
| | Shintaro Ishiwatari | vs. | Michihiro Omigawa | Draw | 2 | 5:00 |
| | Ayumu Shioda | def. | Jin Akimoto | Decision (Unanimous) | 2 | 5:00 |
| | Junya Kodo | def. | Takahiro Hosoi | KO (Punches) | 2 | 0:36 |
| | Akihiro Yamazaki | def. | Yong Jae Jun | Submission (Triangle Armbar) | 2 | 1:39 |
| | Sakae Kasuya | def. | Tomonori Taniguchi | Decision (Unanimous) | 2 | 5:00 |

== Shooto: Shooting Disco 7: Young Man ==
Shooto: Shooting Disco 7: Young Man was an event held on January 31, 2009, at Shinjuku Face in Tokyo, Japan.

=== Results ===
Main Card
| Weight class | | | | Method | Round | Time | Notes |
|---|---|---|---|---|---|---|---|
| | Ryuichi Miki | def. | Homare Kuboyama | TKO (Punches) | 1 | 4:58 |
| | Takuya Sato | def. | Taisuke Okuno | Decision (Unanimous) | 2 | 5:00 |
| | Taiki Tsuchiya | def. | Masatoshi Kobayashi | Decision (Unanimous) | 2 | 5:00 |
| | Guy Delumeau | def. | Kunio Nakajima | Submission (Rear-Naked Choke) | 2 | 1:33 |
| | Hiroaki Ijima | def. | Kota Funaki | Decision (Unanimous) | 2 | 5:00 |
| | Katsuya Murofushi | def. | Takehiro Ishii | Decision (Majority) | 2 | 5:00 |
| | Yoichiro Sato | def. | Hiroaki Sakuma | Submission (Punches) | 2 | 1:04 |
| | Kenichiro Marui | def. | Toshiaki Hayasaka | Decision (Unanimous) | 2 | 5:00 |
| | Nozomi Otsuka | vs. | Tatsuya Nakashima | Draw | 2 | 5:00 |
| | Koshi Matsumoto | def. | Keiji Sakuta | Submission (Kneebar) | 2 | 2:23 |

== Shooto: Gig Tokyo 1 ==
Shooto: Gig Tokyo 1 was an event held on February 28, 2009, at Shinjuku Face in Tokyo, Japan.

=== Results ===
Main Card
| Weight class | | | | Method | Round | Time | Notes |
|---|---|---|---|---|---|---|---|
| | Kenichiro Togashi | def. | Ganjo Tentsuku | Decision (Majority) | 3 | 5:00 |
| | Takeshi Sato | def. | Shinya Murofushi | Submission (Rear-Naked Choke) | 1 | 1:14 |
| | Shinobu Miura | vs. | Komei Okada | Draw | 2 | 5:00 |
| | Hisaki Hiraishi | def. | Masakazu Taguchi | Decision (Unanimous) | 2 | 5:00 |
| | Junpei Chikano | def. | Yohei Ota | Decision (Unanimous) | 2 | 5:00 |
| | Norio Tokuhisa | vs. | Koji Nishioka | Draw | 2 | 5:00 |
| | Munehiro Kin | def. | Fumihiko Kawamura | KO (Punch) | 1 | 1:43 |
| | Yoshihiko Matsumoto | def. | Yuki Yasunaga | Submission (Armbar) | 1 | 1:11 |
| | Yasutaka Ishigami | def. | Yuya Kaneuchi | Decision (Unanimous) | 2 | 5:00 |

== Shooto: Border: Season 1: Outbreak ==
Shooto: Border: Season 1: Outbreak was an event held on March 8, 2009, at Hirano Ward Community Hall in Osaka, Kansai, Japan.

=== Results ===
Main Card
| Weight class | | | | Method | Round | Time | Notes |
|---|---|---|---|---|---|---|---|
| | Junji Ikoma | def. | Fumihiro Kitahara | Decision (Majority) | 2 | 5:00 |
| | Kosuke Eda | vs. | Hiroyuki Tanaka | Draw | 2 | 5:00 |
| | Kazuya Satomoto | def. | Yukinari Tamura | TKO (Doctor Stoppage) | 2 | 1:10 |
| | Tsuneo Kimura | def. | Takayoshi Ono | Decision (Unanimous) | 2 | 5:00 |
| | Taro Kusano | def. | Hiroshi Sugimoto | Decision (Majority) | 2 | 5:00 |
| | Keita Yoshida | vs. | Joji Kawamata | Draw | 2 | 5:00 |
| | Teppei Masuda | def. | Hiroyuki Kondo | Decision (Majority) | 2 | 5:00 |

== Shooto: Shooto Tradition 6 ==
Shooto: Shooto Tradition 6 was an event held on March 20, 2009, at Korakuen Hall in Tokyo, Japan.

=== Results ===
Main Card
| Weight class | | | | Method | Round | Time | Notes |
|---|---|---|---|---|---|---|---|
| Flyweight | Shinichi Kojima (c) | def. | Yuki Shojo | Submission (Rear-Naked Choke) | 3 | 0:38 | (Note: For the Flyweight Championship.) |
| Bantamweight | Masakatsu Ueda (c) | def. | So Tazawa | Decision (Unanimous) | 3 | 5:00 | (Note: For the Bantamweight Championship.) |
| | Hiromasa Ougikubo | def. | Tetsu Suzuki | Decision (Unanimous) | 3 | 5:00 |
| | Noboru Tahara | vs. | Takehiro Harusaki | Draw | 3 | 5:00 |
| | Masaaki Sugawara | vs. | Daiji Takahashi | Draw | 3 | 5:00 |
| | Atsushi Takeuchi | def. | Mikihito Yamagami | Decision (Unanimous) | 2 | 5:00 |
| | Michiyuki Ishibashi | def. | Takayuki Okochi | KO (Punch) | 1 | 0:13 |
| | Kota Onojima | def. | Takashi Niikuni | TKO (Doctor Stoppage) | 1 | 5:00 |

== Shooto: Gig Torao 2 ==
Shooto: Gig Torao 2 was an event held on March 22, 2009, at The Fukuyama Industrial Exchange Center in Fukuyama, Hiroshima, Japan.

=== Results ===
Main Card
| Weight class | | | | Method | Round | Time | Notes |
|---|---|---|---|---|---|---|---|
| | Tsuyoshi Okada | def. | Yasuaki Nagamoto | Decision (Majority) | 2 | 5:00 |
| | Motohiro Takenawa | def. | Naosuke Mizoguchi | Submission (Armbar) | 1 | 4:15 |
| | Jun Nagasoe | def. | Hidetaka Naka | Decision (Unanimous) | 2 | 5:00 |
| | Koji Kishimoto | def. | Takashi Murai | Decision (Unanimous) | 2 | 5:00 |

== Shooto: Shooting Disco 8: We Are Tarzan! ==
Shooto: Shooting Disco 8: We Are Tarzan! was an event held on April 10, 2009, at Shinjuku Face in Tokyo, Japan.

=== Results ===
Main Card
| Weight class | | | | Method | Round | Time | Notes |
|---|---|---|---|---|---|---|---|
| | Ryuichi Miki | def. | Junji Ikoma | Decision (Unanimous) | 3 | 5:00 |
| | Ikuo Usuda | def. | Guy Delumeau | Decision (Majority) | 2 | 5:00 |
| | Yoichiro Sato | def. | Naoki Hirayama | Decision (Unanimous) | 2 | 5:00 |
| | Yusuke Yachi | def. | Kenichiro Marui | Decision (Majority) | 2 | 5:00 |
| | Ayumu Shioda | def. | Shinichi Hanawa | Decision (Unanimous) | 2 | 5:00 |
| | Hisaki Hiraishi | def. | Komei Okada | Technical Decision (Unanimous) | 2 | 2:59 |
| | Tatsuya Nakashima | def. | Hiroaki Ijima | Decision (Unanimous) | 2 | 5:00 |
| | Takahiro Suzuki | def. | Tomohito Tanizaki | Decision (Unanimous) | 2 | 5:00 |
| | Hideki Nishino | def. | Toshiaki Hayasaka | Decision (Unanimous) | 2 | 5:00 |

== Shooto: Gig Central 17 ==
Shooto: Gig Central 17 was an event held on April 12, 2009, at Asunal Kanayama Hall in Nagoya, Aichi, Japan.

=== Results ===
Main Card
| Weight class | | | | Method | Round | Time | Notes |
|---|---|---|---|---|---|---|---|
| | Hiroshi Shiba | def. | Kenichi Hattori | Submission (Rear-Naked Choke) | 1 | 4:53 |
| | Paolo Milano | def. | Takahiro Kajita | Decision (Split) | 2 | 5:00 |
| | Takasuke Kume | def. | Hirosumi Sugiura | Decision (Split) | 2 | 5:00 |
| | Joji Shimada | def. | Hiroshi Sakamoto | Submission (Rear-Naked Choke) | 1 | 3:49 |
| | Masanobu Mori | def. | Daiki Yamaishi | Decision (Unanimous) | 2 | 5:00 |

== Shooto: Gig Tokyo 2 ==
Shooto: Gig Tokyo 2 was an event held on April 19, 2009, at Shinjuku Face in Tokyo, Japan.

=== Results ===
Main Card
| Weight class | | | | Method | Round | Time | Notes |
|---|---|---|---|---|---|---|---|
| | Issei Tamura | def. | Hayate Usui | Decision (Unanimous) | 2 | 5:00 |
| | Daisuke Ishizawa | def. | Sakae Kasuya | KO (Upkicks) | 1 | 1:15 |
| | Toshimichi Akagi | vs. | Fumihiro Kitahara | Draw | 2 | 5:00 |
| | Junji Ito | def. | Kenichi Sawada | Submission (Rear-Naked Choke) | 2 | 0:47 |
| | Yuta Nezu | def. | Masato Sannai | Decision (Unanimous) | 2 | 5:00 |
| | Haruo Ochi | def. | Seiji Akao | TKO (Corner Stoppage) | 1 | 2:18 |
| | Tomokazu Sato | def. | Atsushi Mochizuki | Decision (Unanimous) | 2 | 5:00 |

== Shooto: Gig West 11 ==
Shooto: Gig West 11 was an event held on April 29, 2009, at Azalea Taisho Hall in Osaka, Kansai, Japan.

=== Results ===
Main Card
| Weight class | | | | Method | Round | Time | Notes |
|---|---|---|---|---|---|---|---|
| | Teruyuki Matsumoto | def. | Kosuke Eda | Decision (Majority) | 2 | 5:00 |
| | Toshihiro Shimizu | def. | Yoshinori Takahashi | Decision (Unanimous) | 2 | 5:00 |
| | Tatsunori Tanaka | def. | Hiroshi Sugimoto | Submission (Arm-Triangle Choke) | 1 | 3:22 |
| | Joji Kawamata | vs. | Yasuaki Nagamoto | Draw | 2 | 5:00 |
| | Kota Shimoishi | def. | Kunio Nakajima | Decision (Unanimous) | 2 | 5:00 |
| | Hidetaka Naka | def. | Takahiro Kohori | KO | 2 | 1:55 |

== Shooto: Shooto Tradition Final ==
Shooto: Shooto Tradition Final was an event held on May 10, 2009, at Tokyo Dome City Hall in Tokyo, Japan.

=== Results ===
Main Card
| Weight class | | | | Method | Round | Time | Notes |
|---|---|---|---|---|---|---|---|
| Featherweight | Takeshi Inoue (c) | def. | Rumina Sato | TKO (Punches) | 1 | 4:41 | (Note: For the Featherweight Championship.) |
| | Takanori Gomi | def. | Takashi Nakakura | KO (Punches) | 2 | 4:42 |
| | Willamy Freire | def. | Yusuke Endo | Submission (Guillotine Choke) | 1 | 5:00 |
| | Mizuto Hirota | def. | Mitsuhiro Ishida | TKO (Punches) | 1 | 1:33 |
| | Kenichiro Togashi | def. | Tetsuji Kato | Decision (Majority) | 3 | 5:00 |
| | Kotetsu Boku | def. | Yutaka Ueda | TKO (Punches) | 1 | 4:56 |
| | Akiyo Nishiura | def. | Takumi Ota | Decision (Unanimous) | 2 | 5:00 |
| | Megumi Fujii | def. | Won Bun Chu | Submission (Keylock) | 1 | 0:52 |

== Shooto: Grapplingman 8 ==
Shooto: Grapplingman 8 was an event held on May 17, 2009, at Hiroshima Industrial Hall in Tokyo, Japan.

=== Results ===
Main Card
| Weight class | | | | Method | Round | Time | Notes |
|---|---|---|---|---|---|---|---|
| | Kazuhiro Ito | def. | Daiki Ozaki | Submission (Armbar) | 1 | 0:55 |
| | Haruo Ochi | def. | Tsuyoshi Okada | Technical Submission (Armbar) | 1 | 2:16 |
| | Keisuke Sakai | def. | Makoto Maeda | DQ (Illegal Kick) | 1 | 2:01 |
| | Shinichi Hanawa | def. | Tatsuro Kamei | Decision (Unanimous) | 2 | 5:00 |
| | Yasuo Niki | def. | Katsuhisa Akasaki | TKO (Punches) | 2 | 2:23 |
| | Takayoshi Ono | def. | Hiroaki Nakayama | Decision (Unanimous) | 2 | 5:00 |
| | Keita Yoshida | def. | Yutaka Kimura | Decision (Unanimous) | 2 | 5:00 |

== Shooto: Kitazawa Shooto 2009 Vol. 1 ==
Shooto: Kitazawa Shooto 2009 Vol. 1 was an event held on May 20, 2009, at Kitazawa Town Hall in Tokyo, Japan.

=== Results ===
Main Card
| Weight class | | | | Method | Round | Time | Notes |
|---|---|---|---|---|---|---|---|
| | Hiroyuki Abe | def. | Takehiro Harusaki | Technical Submission (Rear-Naked Choke) | 1 | 1:35 |
| | Mateus Irie Nechio | def. | Hiroaki Sakuma | TKO (Punches) | 1 | 0:45 |
| | Shin Kochiwa | def. | Norio Tokuhisa | TKO (Punches) | 2 | 3:18 |
| | Koshi Matsumoto | def. | Junpei Chikano | Submission (Kneebar) | 1 | 2:24 |
| | Yasutaka Ishigami | vs. | Masumi Tozawa | Draw | 2 | 5:00 |
| | Yuya Kaneuchi | vs. | Akinobu Watanabe | Draw | 2 | 5:00 |
| | Bae Yong Kwon | def. | Keiji Sakuta | Decision (Unanimous) | 2 | 5:00 |

== Shooto: Spirit 2009 ==
Shooto: Spirit 2009 was an event held on May 24, 2009, at Accel Hall in Sendai, Miyagi, Japan.

=== Results ===
Main Card
| Weight class | | | | Method | Round | Time | Notes |
|---|---|---|---|---|---|---|---|
| | Takamaro Watari | def. | Yuki Yasunaga | Decision (Majority) | 2 | 5:00 |
| | Nozomi Otsuka | def. | Nariyasu Fujita | Decision (Unanimous) | 2 | 5:00 |
| | Masaki Yanagisawa | def. | Toshiaki Hayasaka | Submission (Armbar) | 2 | 1:31 |
| | Yusuke Sato | def. | Kazuyuki Yoshida | Submission (Armbar) | 1 | 2:34 |
| | Masako Yoshida | def. | Yasuko Mogi | Decision (Split) | 2 | 5:00 |

== Shooto: Shooting Disco 9: Superman ==
Shooto: Shooting Disco 9: Superman was an event held on June 6, 2009, at Shinjuku Face in Tokyo, Japan.

=== Results ===
Main Card
| Weight class | | | | Method | Round | Time | Notes |
|---|---|---|---|---|---|---|---|
| | Taiki Tsuchiya | def. | Shintaro Ishiwatari | KO (Punches) | 1 | 0:20 |
| | Noboru Tahara | def. | Shinya Murofushi | TKO (Punches) | 3 | 4:09 |
| | Yukinari Tamura | vs. | Guy Delumeau | Draw | 2 | 5:00 |
| | Yoichiro Sato | def. | Akihiro Murayama | Decision (Unanimous) | 2 | 5:00 |
| | Naohiro Mizuno | def. | Yuji Inoue | Decision (Unanimous) | 2 | 5:00 |
| | Hideki Nishino | vs. | Kosuke Kindaichi | Draw | 2 | 5:00 |
| | Tatsuya Nakashima | def. | Joji Shimada | Decision (Majority) | 2 | 5:00 |
| | Jun Nagasoe | def. | Yoshiyuki Takano | Submission (Arm-Triangle Choke) | 1 | 3:31 |
| | Kenta Takagi | def. | Yoshinori Takahashi | TKO (Punches) | 1 | 1:56 |
| | Daisuke Hoshino | def. | Yohei Ota | Decision (Unanimous) | 2 | 5:00 |

== Shooto: Gig North 4 ==
Shooto: Gig North 4 was an event held on June 7, 2009, at Zepp Sapporo in Sapporo, Hokkaido, Japan.

=== Results ===
Main Card
| Weight class | | | | Method | Round | Time | Notes |
|---|---|---|---|---|---|---|---|
| | Daiji Takahashi | def. | Takuya Mori | Decision (Majority) | 3 | 5:00 |
| | Fumihiro Kitahara | def. | Kenji Hosoya | Submission (Rear-Naked Choke) | 2 | 4:49 |
| | Paolo Milano | def. | Michiyuki Ishibashi | Decision (Unanimous) | 2 | 5:00 |
| | Tatsuya Yamamoto | def. | Keisuke Kurata | Decision (Majority) | 2 | 5:00 |
| | Kenichi Sawada | def. | Atsushi Mochizuki | Decision (Unanimous) | 2 | 5:00 |

== Shooto: Revolutionary Exchanges 1: Undefeated ==
Shooto: Revolutionary Exchanges 1: Undefeated was an event held on July 19, 2009, at Korakuen Hall in Tokyo, Japan.

=== Results ===
Main Card
| Weight class | | | | Method | Round | Time | Notes |
|---|---|---|---|---|---|---|---|
| Bantamweight | Masakatsu Ueda (c) | def. | Eduardo Dantas | Decision (Unanimous) | 3 | 5:00 | (Note: For the Bantamweight Championship.) |
| | Jussier da Silva | def. | Shinichi Kojima | Decision (Unanimous) | 3 | 5:00 |
| | Atsushi Takeuchi | def. | Takeshi Sato | Decision (Unanimous) | 3 | 5:00 |
| | Masaaki Sugawara | def. | Yasuhiro Akagi | TKO (Knee and Punches) | 1 | 3:50 |
| | Yukinari Tamura | def. | Shinji Sasaki | Decision (Unanimous) | 2 | 5:00 |
| | Taiki Tsuchiya | def. | Kazuhiro Ito | Decision (Unanimous) | 2 | 5:00 |
| | Tsuneo Kimura | def. | Yoshitaka Okigi | KO (Punch) | 2 | 1:04 |
| | Munehiro Kin | def. | Hiroki Kuga | Decision (Unanimous) | 2 | 5:00 |
| | Tadahiro Harada | def. | Koji Nishioka | Decision (Majority) | 2 | 5:00 |
| | Kota Onojima | def. | Kenjiro Inagaki | Decision (Majority) | 2 | 5:00 |

== Shooto: Gig Saitama 1 ==
Shooto: Gig Saitama 1 was an event held on August 9, 2009, at Fujimi Culture Hall in Fujimi, Saitama, Japan.

=== Results ===
Main Card
| Weight class | | | | Method | Round | Time | Notes |
|---|---|---|---|---|---|---|---|
| | Noboru Tahara | def. | Jesse Taitano | Decision (Unanimous) | 3 | 5:00 |
| | Takehiro Ishii | def. | Mikihito Yamagami | Technical Submission (Keylock) | 1 | 4:21 |
| | Guy Delumeau | def. | Komei Okada | KO (Punch) | 2 | 3:44 |
| | Hideki Nishino | def. | Masaki Yanagisawa | Decision (Unanimous) | 2 | 5:00 |
| | Kosuke Kindaichi | def. | Toshiaki Hayasaka | TKO (Punches) | 1 | 4:49 |
| | Izumi Noguchi | vs. | Tomomi Sunaba | Draw (Unanimous) | 2 | 5:00 |
| | Shuichiro Okumura | def. | Kazuyuki Yoshida | Submission (Rear-Naked Choke) | 1 | 2:36 |
| | Yosuke Saruta | def. | Takahiro Kohori | TKO (Punches) | 1 | 3:06 |

== Shooto: Border: Season 1: Advance ==
Shooto: Border: Season 1: Advance was an event held on August 16, 2009, at Hirano Ward Community Hall in Osaka, Kansai, Japan.

=== Results ===
Main Card
| Weight class | | | | Method | Round | Time | Notes |
|---|---|---|---|---|---|---|---|
| | Takuya Sato | def. | Masaki Konishi | Decision (Unanimous) | 2 | 5:00 |
| | Kentaro Watanabe | def. | Tatsuro Kamei | Decision (Unanimous) | 2 | 5:00 |
| | Hiroshi Shiba | def. | Tatsunori Tanaka | Submission (Triangle Choke) | 2 | 2:19 |
| | Taro Kusano | def. | Kazuya Satomoto | Decision (Unanimous) | 2 | 5:00 |
| | Keita Yoshida | def. | Yasuo Niki | Decision (Unanimous) | 2 | 5:00 |
| | Teppei Masuda | def. | Masanobu Mori | Decision (Unanimous) | 2 | 5:00 |
| | Yutaka Kimura | vs. | Joji Kawamata | Draw | 2 | 5:00 |
| | Yasushi Kato | def. | Nobuyasu Fujikawa | TKO (Punches) | 2 | 0:28 |

== Shooto: Gig Central 18 ==
Shooto: Gig Central 18 was an event held on August 30, 2009, at Asunal Kanayama Hall in Nagoya, Aichi, Japan.

=== Results ===
Main Card
| Weight class | | | | Method | Round | Time | Notes |
|---|---|---|---|---|---|---|---|
| | Taisuke Okuno | vs. | Takasuke Kume | Draw | 2 | 5:00 |
| | Hisaki Hiraishi | def. | Takahiro Kajita | Decision (Unanimous) | 2 | 5:00 |
| | Hiroyuki Kondo | def. | Koji Kishimoto | Decision (Unanimous) | 2 | 5:00 |

== Shooto: Kitazawa Shooto 2009 Vol. 2 ==
Shooto: Kitazawa Shooto 2009 Vol. 2 was an event held on September 4, 2009, at Kitazawa Town Hall in Tokyo, Japan.

=== Results ===
Main Card
| Weight class | | | | Method | Round | Time | Notes |
|---|---|---|---|---|---|---|---|
| | Hiroaki Yoshioka | def. | Hiroyuki Abe | Submission (Guillotine Choke) | 2 | 3:08 |
| | Toshimichi Akagi | def. | Hiroharu Matsufuji | KO (Punch) | 1 | 0:39 |
| | Shin Kochiwa | def. | Junpei Chikano | KO (Punch) | 1 | 3:05 |
| | Koji Nishioka | vs. | Shinobu Miura | Draw | 2 | 5:00 |
| | Masaki Yanagisawa | def. | Takamaro Watari | TKO (Doctor Stoppage) | 1 | 1:17 |
| | Masumi Tozawa | def. | Yuya Kaneuchi | Decision (Unanimous) | 2 | 5:00 |
| | Akinobu Watanabe | def. | Keiji Koizumi | TKO (Punches) | 2 | 4:45 |
| | Isao Yoshida | def. | Keita Ishibashi | Decision (Unanimous) | 2 | 5:00 |

== Shooto: Shooting Disco 10: Twist and Shooto ==
Shooto: Shooting Disco 10: Twist and Shooto was an event held on September 20, 2009, at Shinjuku Face in Tokyo, Japan.

=== Results ===
Main Card
| Weight class | | | | Method | Round | Time | Notes |
|---|---|---|---|---|---|---|---|
| | Yoichiro Sato | def. | Yoshitaro Niimi | TKO (Punches) | 2 | 2:16 |
| | Masaaki Sugawara | def. | Hiroyuki Tanaka | Decision (Split) | 3 | 5:00 |
| | Katsuya Murofushi | def. | Takeshi Sato | Decision (Majority) | 2 | 5:00 |
| | Takahiro Hosoi | vs. | Naohiro Mizuno | Draw | 2 | 5:00 |
| | Kenta Takagi | def. | Hirosumi Sugiura | TKO (Punches) | 1 | 3:30 |
| | Kenji Hosoya | vs. | Hiroaki Ijima | Draw | 2 | 5:00 |
| | Yoshiyuki Takano | def. | Tatsuya Nakashima | Decision (Majority) | 2 | 5:00 |
| | Keita Kono | def. | Yuki Yasunaga | Decision (Unanimous) | 2 | 5:00 |
| | Daisuke Okumiya | def. | Keiji Sakuta | Decision (Unanimous) | 2 | 5:00 |

== Shooto: Revolutionary Exchanges 2 ==
Shooto: Revolutionary Exchanges 2 was an event held on September 22, 2009, at Korakuen Hall in Tokyo, Japan.

=== Results ===
Main Card
| Weight class | | | | Method | Round | Time | Notes |
|---|---|---|---|---|---|---|---|
| | Yusuke Endo | def. | Kotetsu Boku | Submission (Rear-Naked Choke) | 1 | 3:17 |
| | Xavier Lucas | def. | Akihiro Yamazaki | Decision (Unanimous) | 3 | 5:00 |
| | Yasuhiro Urushitani | def. | Ryuichi Miki | Decision (Unanimous) | 3 | 5:00 |
| | Yuki Shojo | def. | Junya Kodo | Decision (Majority) | 3 | 5:00 |
| | Tetsu Suzuki | def. | Teruyuki Matsumoto | Submission (Guillotine Choke) | 1 | 3:31 |
| | Gustavo Falciroli | def. | Daisuke Ishizawa | Submission (Triangle Armbar) | 1 | 4:55 |
| | Fumihiro Kitahara | def. | Masatoshi Abe | Decision (Unanimous) | 2 | 5:00 |
| | Yusuke Yachi | def. | Atsushi Kobayashi | TKO (Head Kick and Punches) | 1 | 1:21 |
| | Nozomi Otsuka | def. | Yasutaka Ishigami | Decision (Unanimous) | 2 | 5:00 |

== Shooto: Border: Season 1: Clash ==
Shooto: Border: Season 1: Clash was an event held on October 4, 2009, at Hirano Ward Community Hall in Osaka, Kansai, Japan.

=== Results ===
Main Card
| Weight class | | | | Method | Round | Time | Notes |
|---|---|---|---|---|---|---|---|
| | Ayumu Shioda | def. | Junji Ikoma | Submission (Armbar) | 2 | 3:49 |
| | Masaki Konishi | def. | Sang Won Ji | TKO (Punches) | 1 | 0:50 |
| | Hideru Inoue | def. | Kentaro Watanabe | KO (Punch) | 1 | 1:00 |
| | Tsuneo Kimura | def. | Hiroaki Nakayama | Decision (Unanimous) | 2 | 5:00 |
| | Taro Kusano | vs. | Tadahiro Harada | Draw (Majority) | 2 | 5:00 |
| | Akinobu Watanabe | def. | Hidetaka Naka | Decision (Unanimous) | 2 | 5:00 |
| | Takashi Goto | def. | Yasushi Kato | Submission (Armbar) | 1 | 4:56 |

== Shooto: Gig Tokyo 3 ==
Shooto: Gig Tokyo 3 was an event held on October 18, 2009, at Shinjuku Face in Tokyo, Japan.

=== Results ===
Main Card
| Weight class | | | | Method | Round | Time | Notes |
|---|---|---|---|---|---|---|---|
| | Koetsu Okazaki | def. | Hiromasa Ougikubo | TKO (Punches) | 2 | 2:08 |
| | Guy Delumeau | def. | Jin Kazeta | Decision (Unanimous) | 2 | 5:00 |
| | Masaki Yanagisawa | def. | Kazuhiro Ito | Submission (Triangle Choke) | 2 | 1:07 |
| | Yuta Nezu | def. | Nobuhiro Hayakawa | TKO (Doctor Stoppage) | 2 | 4:38 |
| | Mateus Irie Nechio | def. | Yoshinori Takahashi | Submission (Kimura) | 1 | 2:58 |
| | Masato Sannai | def. | Keita Ishibashi | Submission (Armbar) | 1 | 3:09 |
| | Yoshitaka Okigi | def. | Hiroki Kita | Submission (Armbar) | 1 | 3:28 |
| | Koshi Matsumoto | def. | Munehiro Kin | Submission (Rear-Naked Choke) | 1 | 4:28 |
| | Yosuke Saruta | def. | Jun Nagasoe | Decision (Unanimous) | 2 | 5:00 |
| | Yusuke Sato | def. | Tomokazu Sato | Decision (Unanimous) | 2 | 5:00 |

== Shooto: Gig Central 19 ==
Shooto: Gig Central 19 was an event held on October 25, 2009, at Asunal Kanayama Hall in Nagoya, Aichi, Japan.

=== Results ===
Main Card
| Weight class | | | | Method | Round | Time | Notes |
|---|---|---|---|---|---|---|---|
| | Takasuke Kume | def. | Kenta Takagi | Decision (Unanimous) | 2 | 5:00 |
| | Toshimichi Akagi | def. | Ichaku Murata | TKO (Punches) | 1 | 4:18 |
| | Akira Kibe | def. | Shinobu Aoyama | Submission (Rear-Naked Choke) | 1 | 3:04 |
| | Kenichi Sawada | vs. | Keisuke Kurata | Draw | 2 | 5:00 |
| | Hiroyuki Kondo | def. | Masanobu Mori | Decision (Unanimous) | 2 | 5:00 |
| | Ayaka Hamasaki | def. | Kinuka Sasaki | Submission (Armbar) | 2 | 2:00 |

== Shooto: Revolutionary Exchanges 3 ==
Shooto: Revolutionary Exchanges 3 was an event held on November 23, 2009, at Tokyo Dome City Hall in Tokyo, Japan.

=== Results ===
Main Card
| Weight class | | | | Method | Round | Time | Notes |
|---|---|---|---|---|---|---|---|
| Strawweight | Rambaa Somdet | def. | Noboru Tahara | Decision (Unanimous) | 3 | 5:00 | (Note: For the Strawweight Championship.) |
| | Ryuichi Miki | def. | Masaaki Sugawara | Decision (Unanimous) | 3 | 5:00 |
| | Issei Tamura | def. | Gustavo Falciroli | Decision (Unanimous) | 3 | 5:00 |
| | Takuya Wada | def. | Shiko Yamashita | Submission (Rear-Naked Choke) | 3 | 4:26 |
| | Kotetsu Boku | def. | Yukio Sakaguchi | KO (Punch) | 1 | 1:54 |
| | Mamoru Yamaguchi | def. | Kiyotaka Shimizu | Decision (Majority) | 3 | 5:00 |
| | Megumi Fujii | def. | Tomomi Sunaba | Submission (Armbar) | 1 | 3:24 |
| | Shuichiro Katsumura | def. | So Tazawa | Submission (Brabo Choke) | 1 | 3:54 |
| | Yoshihiro Koyama | def. | Tetsuji Kato | TKO (Punches) | 2 | 1:22 |
| | Daisuke Sugie | def. | Paolo Milano | Decision (Unanimous) | 2 | 5:00 |

== Shooto: Grapplingman 9 ==
Shooto: Grapplingman 9 was an event held on November 29, 2009, at Kitajima North Park General Fitness Center in Kitajima, Tokushima, Japan.

=== Results ===
Main Card
| Weight class | | | | Method | Round | Time | Notes |
|---|---|---|---|---|---|---|---|
| | Yutaka Ueda | def. | Shinji Sasaki | Decision (Unanimous) | 3 | 5:00 |
| | Yoshitaka Aki | def. | Takahisa Toyoshima | Submission (Guillotine Choke) | 1 | 0:48 |
| | Tomokazu Yuasa | def. | Ryuichiro Sumimura | Decision (Unanimous) | 2 | 5:00 |
| | Yasuo Niki | def. | Yutaka Kimura | Decision (Unanimous) | 2 | 5:00 |
| | Kosuke Kindaichi | def. | Shoki Omichi | Submission (Armbar) | 1 | 2:49 |
| | Masayoshi Kato | def. | Noriyuki Takei | Decision (Unanimous) | 2 | 5:00 |

== Shooto: The Rookie Tournament 2009 Final ==
Shooto: The Rookie Tournament 2009 Final was an event held on December 13, 2009, at Shinjuku Face in Tokyo, Japan.

=== Results ===
Main Card
| Weight class | | | | Method | Round | Time | Notes |
|---|---|---|---|---|---|---|---|
| | Guy Delumeau | def. | Mateus Irie Nechio | Decision (Unanimous) | 2 | 5:00 |
| | Junji Ito | def. | Takeshi Sato | Decision (Unanimous) | 2 | 5:00 |
| | Naohiro Mizuno | def. | Yuta Nezu | Decision (Unanimous) | 2 | 5:00 |
| | Yusuke Yachi | def. | Tsuneo Kimura | Technical Submission (Kimura) | 2 | 2:21 |
| | Hiroyuki Kondo | vs. | Yusuke Sato | Draw (Unanimous) | 3 | 5:00 |
| | Keita Yoshida | vs. | Haruo Ochi | Draw (Majority) | 3 | 5:00 |
| | Koshi Matsumoto | def. | Taro Kusano | Decision (Unanimous) | 2 | 5:00 |
| | Yosuke Saruta | vs. | Nozomi Otsuka | Draw (Split) | 3 | 5:00 |
| | Takahiro Suzuki | def. | Takashi Goto | Submission (Rear-Naked Choke) | 1 | 3:52 |

== Shooto: Alternative 1 ==
Shooto: Alternative 1 was an event held on December 23, 2009, at Sumiyoshi Community Center Hall in Osaka, Kansai, Japan.

=== Results ===
Main Card
| Weight class | | | | Method | Round | Time | Notes |
|---|---|---|---|---|---|---|---|
| | Taisuke Okuno | def. | Masaki Konishi | TKO (Punches) | 1 | 0:47 |
| | Hiroyuki Tanaka | def. | Hideru Inoue | Decision (Majority) | 2 | 5:00 |
| | Yukinari Tamura | def. | Hiroshi Shiba | Decision (Unanimous) | 2 | 5:00 |
| | Kenichi Hattori | def. | Hiroshi Sugimoto | Submission (Triangle Choke) | 1 | 2:50 |
| | Tadaaki Yamamoto | def. | Teppei Masuda | Submission (Kimura) | 1 | 2:46 |
| | Yuki Nishigo | def. | Takeshi Kasugai | Decision (Unanimous) | 2 | 5:00 |

== See also ==
- Shooto
- List of Shooto champions
- List of Shooto Events
