= Issei Tamura =

Japanese mixed martial arts fighter

- Born: March 12, 1984 (age 42)
- Nationality: Japanese
- Height: 5 ft 5 in (165 cm)
- Weight: 144.8 lb (66 kg; 10 st 5 lb)
- Division: Featherweight (2008–2012, 2015–present); Bantamweight (2012–2015)
- Reach: 63 in (160 cm)
- Fighting out of: Tokyo, Japan
- Team: Krazy Bee
- Rank: A-Class Shootist; Purple belt in Brazilian jiu-jitsu
- Years active: 2008–present

Mixed martial arts record
- Total: 27
- Wins: 15
- By knockout: 5
- By decision: 10
- Losses: 12
- By knockout: 4
- By submission: 5
- By decision: 3

Other information
- Mixed martial arts record from Sherdog

Issei Tamura (田村 一聖, Tamura Issei; born March 12, 1984) is a Japanese mixed martial artist currently competing in the Featherweight division of Pancrase. A professional competitor since 2008, he has competed for the UFC and Shooto.

== Mixed martial arts career ==
=== Early career ===
Tamura made his professional MMA debut in June 2008 for the Shooto organization. Prior to signing with the UFC, all of his fights have taken place in this promotion where he amassed a record of 6 wins and 2 losses.

Tamura trains out of the Krazy Bee camp alongside former top-ranked fighter Kid Yamamoto.

=== Ultimate Fighting Championship ===
Tamura was signed to the UFC in February 2012. In his debut he fought Zhang Tiequan at UFC 144, filling in for an injured Leonard Garcia. Tamura won via KO at 0:32 seconds into the second round.

Tamura dropped down to bantamweight and faced Raphael Assunção on July 11, 2012, at UFC on Fuel TV: Munoz vs. Weidman Tamura lost to Assunção via second round TKO.

Tamura was expected to face Mitch Gagnon on March 16, 2013, at UFC 158. However, Gagnon was forced out of the bout with an injury and was replaced by T.J. Dillashaw. Tamura was defeated by Dillashaw in the second round via KO and was subsequently released from the promotion.

=== ROAD FC ===
On July 18, 2013, Korean MMA promotion ROAD FC announced that they had signed Issei Tamura to their roster. He debuted at ROAD FC 13 on October 12, 2013, against Min Jung Song. He lost the fight via submission.

=== Pancrase ===
After three straight losses in Road FC, Tamura signed with Pancrase.

Racking two straight victories in Pancrase, Tamura earned a title shot for the vacant Pancrase Interim Featherweight Championship against Juntaro Ushiku at Pancrase 277 on April 24, 2016. He claimed the interim championship via third-round knockout.

Tamura was then expected to face reigning champion Andy Main in the title unification bout at Pancrase 282 on November 13, 2016. However, Tamura withdrew from the bout due to fractured nose.

He was then set to face Nazareno Malegarie for the Pancrase Featherweight Championship at Pancrase 285 on March 12, 2017. He lost the bout via first-round submission.

Tamura was scheduled to face Suguru Nii at Pancrase 313 on March 8, 2020. However, the event was postponed due to the COVID-19 pandemic and the bout was scrapped.

Tamura was then scheduled to face Yuki Takahashi at Pancrase 317 on August 23, 2020, but the event was cancelled due to the COVID-19 pandemic.

Tamura next faced Akira Okada at Pancrase 319 on October 25, 2020. He lost the fight via second-round knockout.

Tamura faced Hirotaka Nakada at Pancrase 321 on May 30, 2021. He lost the bout after his corner threw in the flag and stopped the fight in the first round.

Tamura faced Kisa Miyake at Pancrase 327 on April 29, 2022. He won the bout via unanimous decision.

Tamura faced Ryo Asami on December 25, 2022, at Pancrase 330, winning the bout via unanimous decision.

== Championships and accomplishments ==
=== Mixed martial arts ===
- Shooto'
  - Lightweight 2008 Rookie of the Year
  - 2007 All Japan Championship Welterweight runner-up
- Pancrase
  - King of Pancrase Interim Featherweight Championship (1 Time, former)

== Mixed martial arts record ==
Professional record breakdown
27 matches	15 wins	12 losses
By knockout	5	4
By submission	0	5
By decision	10	3

Res.	Record	Opponent	Method	Event	Date	Round	Time	Location	Notes
Win	15–12	Ryo Asami	Decision (unanimous)	Pancrase 330	December 25, 2022	3	5:00	Yokohama, Japan	
Win	14–12	Kisa Miyake	Decision (unanimous)	Pancrase 327	April 29, 2022	3	5:00	Tokyo, Japan	
Loss	13–12	Hirotaka Nakada	TKO (corner stoppage)	Pancrase 321	May 30, 2021	1	3:36	Tokyo, Japan	
Loss	13–11	Akira Okada	KO (punch)	Pancrase 319	October 25, 2020	2	0:42	Tokyo, Japan	
Win	13–10	Katsushi Sugiyama	KO (punch)	Pancrase 308	September 29, 2019	1	1:25	Tokyo, Japan	
Loss	12–10	Kazumasa Majima	Submission (arm-triangle choke)	Pancrase 305	May 26, 2019	3	3:41	Tokyo, Japan	
Loss	12–9	Taichi Nakajima	Decision (unanimous)	Pancrase 299	September 9, 2018	3	5:00	Tokyo, Japan	
Win	12–8	Yoshinori Horie	TKO (punches)	Pancrase 294	March 11, 2018	2	1:28	Tokyo, Japan	
Win	11–8	Takumi Suzuki	Decision (unanimous)	Pancrase 291	November 12, 2017	3	5:00	Tokyo, Japan	
Loss	10–8	Nazareno Malegarie	Submission (rear-naked choke)	Pancrase 285	March 12, 2017	1	2:50	Tokyo, Japan	Lost the interim Pancrase Featherweight Championship.
Win	10–7	Juntaro Ushiku	KO (punch)	Pancrase 277	April 24, 2016	3	1:52	Tokyo, Japan	Won the interim Pancrase Featherweight Championship.
Win	9–7	Takumi Nakayama	Decision (unanimous)	Pancrase 273	December 13, 2015	3	5:00	Tokyo, Japan	
Win	8–7	Hikaru Hasumi	Decision (unanimous)	Pancrase 269	August 9, 2015	3	5:00	Tokyo, Japan	Return to Featherweight.
Loss	7–7	Yeong Seung Cho	Submission (rear-naked choke)	Road Fighting Championship 22	March 21, 2015	2	3:57	Seoul, South Korea	
Loss	7–6	Soo Chul Kim	Submission (rear-naked choke)	Road Fighting Championship 15	May 31, 2014	1	2:41	Wonju, South Korea	
Loss	7–5	Min-Jung Song	Submission (rear-naked choke)	Road Fighting Championship 13	October 12, 2013	3	N/A	Gumi, North Gyeongsang, South Korea	
Loss	7–4	T.J. Dillashaw	KO (head kick & punches)	UFC 158	March 16, 2013	2	0:26	Montreal, Quebec, Canada	
Loss	7–3	Raphael Assunção	TKO (punches)	UFC on Fuel TV: Munoz vs. Weidman	July 11, 2012	2	0:25	San Jose, California, United States	Bantamweight debut.
Win	7–2	Zhang Tiequan	KO (punch)	UFC 144	February 26, 2012	2	0:32	Saitama, Japan	
Loss	6–2	Guy Delumeau	Decision (majority)	Shooto: Shooto the Shoot 2011	November 5, 2011	3	5:00	Tokyo, Japan	
Win	6–1	Katsuya Toida	KO (punches)	Shooto: Gig Tokyo 7	August 6, 2011	1	1:23	Tokyo, Japan	
Loss	5–1	Taiki Tsuchiya	Decision (majority)	Shooto: The Way of Shooto 4: Like a Tiger, Like a Dragon	July 19, 2010	3	5:00	Tokyo, Japan	
Win	5–0	Gustavo Falciroli	Decision (unanimous)	Shooto: Revolutionary Exchanges 3	November 23, 2009	3	5:00	Tokyo, Japan	
Win	4–0	Hayate Usui	Decision (unanimous)	Shooto: Gig Tokyo 2	April 19, 2009	2	5:00	Tokyo, Japan	
Win	3–0	Naohiro Mizuno	Decision (unanimous)	Shooto: The Rookie Tournament 2008 Final	December 13, 2008	2	5:00	Tokyo, Japan	Won Shooto 2008 Rookie Tournament.
Win	2–0	Takumi Ota	Decision (majority)	Shooto: 10/13 in Kitazawa Town Hall	October 13, 2008	2	5:00	Tokyo, Japan	
Win	1–0	Yasuhiro Kanayama	Decision (unanimous)	Shooto: 6/26 in Kitazawa Town Hall	June 26, 2008	2	5:00	Tokyo, Japan	

== See also ==
- List of male mixed martial artists
