= Akira Kibe =

Japanese mixed martial arts fighter

Akira Kibe 木部晃
- Born: October 7, 1976 (age 50); Japan
- Nationality: Japanese
- Height: 5 ft 6 in (1.68 m)
- Weight: 135 lb (61 kg; 9.6 st)
- Division: Flyweight; Bantamweight
- Team: Splash
- Years active: 2001 - 2014

Mixed martial arts record
- Total: 33
- Wins: 18
- By knockout: 6
- By submission: 7
- By decision: 5
- Losses: 13
- By knockout: 6
- By decision: 7
- Draws: 2

Other information
- Mixed martial arts record from Sherdog

Akira Kibe Japanese: 木部晃 (born October 7, 1976) is a Japanese mixed martial artist. He competed in the flyweight and bantamweight divisions.

== Mixed martial arts record ==
Professional record breakdown
33 matches	18 wins	13 losses
By knockout	6	6
By submission	7	0
By decision	5	7
Draws	2	

Res.	Record	Opponent	Method	Event	Date	Round	Time	Location	Notes
Loss	18-13-2	Toshinori Tsunemura	Decision (Unanimous)	Deep: Nagoya Impact 2014	February 9, 2014	2	5:00	Kasugai, Japan	
Win	18-12-2	Harushige Shinokawa	Submission (Rear-Naked Choke)	Deep: Nagoya Impact: Kobudo Fight	August 10, 2013	1	4:24	Kasugai, Japan	
Loss	17-12-2	Sota Kojima	TKO (Punches)	Deep: Nagoya Impact: Kobudo Fight	May 5, 2013	1	1:34	Nagoya, Japan	
Loss	17-11-2	Yuki Motoya	KO (Head Kick)	Deep: Nagoya Impact 2012: Kobudo Fight	July 22, 2012	1	0:18	Nagoya, Japan	
Win	17-10-2	Akito Sakimura	TKO (Punches)	Deep: Nagoya Impact 2012: Kobudo Fight	July 22, 2012	1	4:44	Nagoya, Japan	
Win	16-10-2	Takashige Hirukawa	Submission (Armbar)	Deep: Nagoya Impact: Kobudo Fight	March 25, 2012	1	2:17	Kasugai, Japan	
Win	15-10-2	Hirotaka Himeno	TKO (Punches)	Deep: clubDeep Nagoya: Kobudo Fight 3	October 9, 2011	1	4:50	Nagoya, Japan	
Win	14-10-2	Hirotaka Miyakawa	TKO (Punches)	Deep: Cage Impact 2011 in Nagoya	July 10, 2011	1	1:49	Nagoya, Japan	
Win	13-10-2	Isao Terada	Decision (Majority)	Deep: clubDeep Nagoya: Kobudo Fight 2	February 13, 2011	2	5:00	Nagoya, Japan	
Win	12-10-2	Sho Nonaka	TKO (Punches)	Deep: clubDeep Nagoya: Kobudo Fight	September 5, 2010	1	2:53	Nagoya, Japan	
Win	11-10-2	Satoshi Watanabe	Decision (Unanimous)	Deep: Cage Impact in Nagoya	July 11, 2010	2	5:00	Nagoya, Japan	
Loss	10-10-2	Tomohiko Hori	TKO (Punches)	Deep: clubDeep Tokyo in Shinkiba 1st Ring	May 23, 2010	2	4:23	Tokyo, Japan	
Win	10-9-2	Shinobu Aoyama	Submission (Rear-Naked Choke)	Shooto: Gig Central 19	October 25, 2009	1	3:04	Nagoya, Aichi, Japan	
Win	9-9-2	Kunihiro Watanabe	Submission (Rear-Naked Choke)	Deep: clubDeep Hamamatsu	September 28, 2008	1	0:36	Hamamatsu, Japan	
Win	8-9-2	Tsuyoshi Okada	Decision (Unanimous)	Shooto: Gig Central 15	August 3, 2008	2	5:00	Nagoya, Aichi, Japan	
Win	7-9-2	Masayuki Demise	Decision (Majority)	Deep: clubDeep Toyama: Barbarian Festival 7	June 1, 2008	2	5:00	Toyama, Japan	
Loss	6-9-2	Junya Kodo	KO (Punches)	Shooto: Gig West 9	March 15, 2008	1	1:38	Osaka, Kansai, Japan	
Win	6-8-2	Ryota Matsui	TKO (Punches)	Deep: clubDeep Hamamatsu	October 21, 2007	1	1:01	Hamamatsu, Japan	
Loss	5-8-2	Kohei Fujiwara	TKO	Powergate: Kaiser Grand Prix 2007 Second Round	June 17, 2007	1	2:05	Osaka, Kansai, Japan	
Win	5-7-2	Nakashige Tokuoka	Submission (Armbar)	Powergate 14: Kaiser Grand Prix 2007 First Round	April 8, 2007	2	1:27	Osaka, Kansai, Japan	
Loss	4-7-2	Teruyuki Matsumoto	Decision (Unanimous)	Shooto: Gig Central 12	March 25, 2007	2	5:00	Nagoya, Aichi, Japan	
Win	4-6-2	Takao Tamura	TKO (Punches)	Shooto: Gig Central 11	November 26, 2006	1	4:32	Nagoya, Aichi, Japan	
Draw	3-6-2	Takahiro Hosoi	Draw	Shooto: Gig Central 9	February 26, 2006	2	5:00	Nagoya, Aichi, Japan	
Loss	3-6-1	Hiroyuki Tanaka	Decision (Majority)	Shooto: Gig Central 8	July 3, 2005	2	5:00	Nagoya, Aichi, Japan	
Loss	3-5-1	Shinobu Aoyama	KO (Punch)	Deep: clubDeep Toyama: Barbarian Festival 1	October 24, 2004	1	4:34	Toyama, Japan	
Win	3-4-1	Yasuji Numa	Submission (Armbar)	Shooto: Gig Central 6	September 12, 2004	1	1:48	Nagoya, Aichi, Japan	
Win	2-4-1	Manabu Kano	Submission (Kimura)	Shooto: Gig Central 4	September 21, 2003	1	1:45	Nagoya, Aichi, Japan	
Loss	1-4-1	Akitoshi Hokazono	Decision (Unanimous)	Shooto: Gig Central 3	March 30, 2003	2	5:00	Nagoya, Aichi, Japan	
Loss	1-3-1	Akira Komatsu	Decision (Majority)	Shooto: Gig Central 2	October 6, 2002	2	5:00	Nagoya, Aichi, Japan	
Win	1-2-1	Noriyuki Yokoyama	Decision (Majority)	Shooto: Gig East 9	May 28, 2002	2	5:00	Tokyo, Japan	
Loss	0-2-1	Masato Shiozawa	Decision (Unanimous)	Shooto: Wanna Shooto Japan	April 21, 2002	2	5:00	Setagaya, Tokyo, Japan	
Draw	0-1-1	Akitoshi Hokazono	Draw	Shooto: Treasure Hunt 3	February 11, 2002	2	5:00	Kobe, Hyogo, Japan	
Loss	0-1	Hiroki Kita	Decision (Majority)	Shooto: Gig East 7	November 26, 2001	2	5:00	Tokyo, Japan	

== See also ==
- List of male mixed martial artists
