= 2008 in Shooto =

Mixed martial arts events

Information
- First date: January 26, 2008
- Last date: December 13, 2008

Events
- Total events: 22

Fights
- Total fights: 171
- Title fights: 6

Chronology
2007 in Shooto	2008 in Shooto	2009 in Shooto

The year 2008 is the 20th year in the history of Shooto, a mixed martial arts promotion based in Japan. In 2008 Shooto held 22 events beginning with, Shooto: Back To Our Roots 7.

== Title fights ==
Title fights in 2008
Weight class				Method	Round	Time	Event	Notes
Featherweight	Hideki Kadowaki	def.	Akitoshi Tamura (c)	Decision (Majority)	3	5:00	Shooto: Back To Our Roots 8	(Note: For the Featherweight Championship.)
Bantamweight	Masakatsu Ueda	def.	Koetsu Okazaki	Decision (Unanimous)	3	5:00	Shooto: Back To Our Roots 8	(Note: For the Bantamweight Championship.)
Lightweight	Takashi Nakakura	def.	Ganjo Tentsuku	Decision (Unanimous)	3	5:00	Shooto: Shooto Tradition 1	(Note: For the Lightweight Championship.)
Flyweight	Shinichi Kojima (c)	def.	Mamoru Yamaguchi	Submission (Guillotine Choke)	3	3:42	Shooto: Shooto Tradition 2	(Note: For the Flyweight Championship.)
Bantamweight	Masakatsu Ueda (c)	vs.	Marcos Galvao	Draw	3	5:00	Shooto: Shooto Tradition 3	(Note: For the Bantamweight Championship.)
Featherweight	Takeshi Inoue	def.	Hideki Kadowaki (c)	Decision (Unanimous)	3	5:00	Shooto: Shooto Tradition 4	(Note: For the Featherweight Championship.)

== Events list ==
#	Event Title	Date	Arena	Location
255	Shooto: The Rookie Tournament 2008 Final	December 13, 2008	Shinjuku Face	Tokyo, Japan
254	Shooto: Shooto Tradition 4	November 29, 2008	Korakuen Hall	Tokyo, Japan
253	Shooto: Gig North 3	November 22, 2008	Zepp Sapporo	Sapporo, Hokkaido, Japan
252	Shooto: Gig Central 16	October 26, 2008	Tokai TV Telepia Hall	Nagoya, Aichi, Japan
251	Shooto: 10/13 in Kitazawa Town Hall	October 13, 2008		Kitazawa, Japan
250	Shooto: Shooting Disco 6: Glory Shines In You	October 5, 2008	Shinjuku Face	Tokyo, Japan
249	Shooto: Shooto Tradition 3	September 28, 2008	Korakuen Hall	Tokyo, Japan
248	Shooto: Gig West 10	September 20, 2008	Azalea Taisho Hall	Osaka, Kansai, Japan
247	Shooto: Gig Central 15	August 3, 2008	Zepp Nagoya	Nagoya, Aichi, Japan
246	Shooto: Shooto Tradition 2	July 18, 2008	Korakuen Hall	Tokyo, Japan
245	Shooto: 6/26 in Kitazawa Town Hall	June 26, 2008	Kitazawa Town Hall	Setagaya, Tokyo, Japan
244	Shooto: Shooting Disco 5: Earth, Wind and Fighter	June 21, 2008	Shinjuku Face	Tokyo, Japan
243	Shooto: Gig North 2	May 25, 2008	Zepp Sapporo	Sapporo, Hokkaido, Japan
242	Shooto: Grapplingman 7	May 18, 2008	Hiroshima Industrial Hall	Hiroshima, Japan
241	Shooto: Shooto Tradition 1	May 3, 2008	Tokyo Dome City Hall	Tokyo, Japan
240	Shooto: Back To Our Roots 8	March 28, 2008	Korakuen Hall	Tokyo, Japan
239	Shooto: Gig Torao 1	March 23, 2008	Fukuyama Industrial Exchange Center	Fukuyama, Hiroshima, Japan
238	Shooto: 3/21 in Kitazawa Town Hall	March 21, 2008	Kitazawa Town Hall	Setagaya, Tokyo, Japan
237	Shooto: Gig Central 14	March 16, 2008	Tokai TV Telepia Hall	Nagoya, Aichi, Japan
236	Shooto: Gig West 9	March 15, 2008	Azalea Taisho Hall	Osaka, Kansai, Japan
235	Shooto: Shooting Disco 4: Born in the Fighting	February 23, 2008	Shinjuku Face	Tokyo, Japan
234	Shooto: Back To Our Roots 7	January 26, 2008	Korakuen Hall	Tokyo, Japan

== Shooto: Back To Our Roots 7 ==
Shooto: Back To Our Roots 7 was an event held on January 26, 2008 at Korakuen Hall in Tokyo, Japan.

=== Results ===
Main Card
Weight class				Method	Round	Time	Notes
	Hatsu Hioki	def.	Katsuya Toida	Submission (Armbar)	2	4:30
	Masakatsu Ueda	def.	Atsushi Yamamoto	Decision (Unanimous)	3	5:00
	So Tazawa	def.	Shinichi Kojima	Technical Submission (Armbar)	3	3:32
	Junji Ikoma	vs.	Jin Akimoto	Draw	3	5:00
	Hayate Usui	def.	Daisuke Ishizawa	Decision (Unanimous)	2	5:00
	Takuya Mori	def.	Ayumu Shioda	Decision (Unanimous)	2	5:00
	Junji Ito	def.	Kazuyuki Yoshida	TKO (Punches)	1	1:52
	Kota Funaki	def.	Yosuke Saruta	TKO (Towel, Punches)	2	2:22

== Shooto: Shooting Disco 4: Born in the Fighting ==
Shooto: Shooting Disco 4: Born in the Fighting was an event held on February 23, 2008 at Shinjuku Face in Tokyo, Japan.

=== Results ===
Main Card
Weight class				Method	Round	Time	Notes
	Mamoru Yamaguchi	def.	Yuki Shojo	Decision (Unanimous)	3	5:00
	Akihiro Murayama	def.	Hiroki Sato	Decision (Unanimous)	2	5:00
	Ryuichi Miki	def.	Kenji Hosoya	Decision (Unanimous)	2	5:00
	Shintaro Ishiwatari	def.	Kazuhiro Ito	KO (Slam)	1	2:17
	Masatoshi Kobayashi	def.	Tomonori Taniguchi	TKO (Swollen Eye)	1	3:01
	Noboru Tahara	def.	Takehiro Ishii	Decision (Unanimous)	2	5:00
	Taiki Tsuchiya	def.	Hideki Nishino	KO (Punches)	2	2:54
	Yuki Baba	def.	Tatsuya Nakashima	Decision (Unanimous)	2	5:00
	Naoji Mikoshiba	def.	Taijiro Iseki	Decision (Majority)	2	5:00
	Haruo Ochi	def.	Masumi Tozawa	KO (Slam)	1	3:11

== Shooto: Gig West 9 ==
Shooto: Gig West 9 was an event held on March 15, 2008 at Azalea Taisho Hall in Osaka, Kansai, Japan.

=== Results ===
Main Card
Weight class				Method	Round	Time	Notes
	Shinji Sasaki	def.	Paolo Milano	Submission (Rear Naked Choke)	2	0:59
	Junya Kodo	def.	Akira Kibe	KO (Punches)	1	1:38
	Yusaku Tanaka	def.	Nobuyasu Fujikawa	TKO (Punches)	1	2:00
	Yukinari Tamura	def.	Taro Kusano	Decision (Majority)	2	5:00
	Hiroshi Sugimoto	def.	Yasuaki Kishimoto	Decision (Majority)	2	5:00

== Shooto: Gig Central 14 ==
Shooto: Gig Central 14 was an event held on March 16, 2008 at Tokai TV Telepia Hall in Nagoya, Aichi, Japan.

=== Results ===
Main Card
Weight class				Method	Round	Time	Notes
	Yoshitaro Niimi	vs.	Hirosumi Sugiura	Draw	2	5:00
	Yutaka Ueda	def.	Takahiro Kajita	Decision (Unanimous)	2	5:00
	Kenichi Hattori	def.	Masakazu Taguchi	Submission (Armbar)	1	2:30
	Takasuke Kume	def.	Yoshifumi Dogaki	TKO (Doctor Stoppage)	1	3:38
	Kenya Kato	def.	Tomohiko Yoshida	Decision (Unanimous)	2	5:00
	Hiroyuki Kondo	def.	Takeshi Sato	Decision (Unanimous)	2	5:00
	Hirosuke Ito	def.	Joji Kawamata	Decision (Unanimous)	2	5:00

== Shooto: 3/21 in Kitazawa Town Hall ==
Shooto: 3/21 in Kitazawa Town Hall was an event held on March 21, 2008 at Kitazawa Town Hall in Setagaya, Tokyo, Japan.

=== Results ===
Main Card
Weight class				Method	Round	Time	Notes
	Yuji Inoue	def.	Kyotaro Nakao	Decision (Unanimous)	2	5:00
	Katsuya Murofushi	def.	Kenichi Sawada	Submission (Triangle Choke)	1	1:53
	Shinichi Hanawa	def.	Joji Shimada	Decision (Unanimous)	2	5:00
	Hiroharu Matsufuji	def.	Katsuhisa Akasaki	Submission (Kimura)	2	3:04
	Kazuya Satomoto	def.	Hiroki Kuga	Submission (Triangle Armbar)	2	1:55
	Yoichiro Sato	def.	Toru Ishinaka	Decision (Unanimous)	2	5:00
	Naoki Hirayama	def.	Shin Kochiwa	Decision (Unanimous)	2	5:00

== Shooto: Gig Torao 1 ==
Shooto: Gig Torao 1 was an event held on March 23, 2008 at Fukuyama Industrial Exchange Center in Fukuyama, Hiroshima, Japan.

=== Results ===
Main Card
Weight class				Method	Round	Time	Notes
	Tsuyoshi Okada	vs.	Nobuhiro Hayakawa	Draw	2	5:00
	Makoto Akazawa	def.	Takayoshi Ono	Submission (Rear Naked Choke)	2	2:56
	Kentaro Watanabe	def.	Jun Nagasoe	Decision (Unanimous)	2	5:00

== Shooto: Back To Our Roots 8 ==
Shooto: Back To Our Roots 8 was an event held on March 28, 2008 at Korakuen Hall in Tokyo, Japan.

=== Results ===
Main Card
Weight class				Method	Round	Time	Notes
Featherweight	Hideki Kadowaki	def.	Akitoshi Tamura (c)	Decision (Majority)	3	5:00	(Note: For the Featherweight Championship.)
Bantamweight	Masakatsu Ueda	def.	Koetsu Okazaki	Decision (Unanimous)	3	5:00	(Note: For the Bantamweight Championship.)
	Hatsu Hioki	def.	Baret Yoshida	TKO (Punches)	1	4:51
	Mamoru Yamaguchi	def.	Masaaki Sugawara	Decision (Unanimous)	3	5:00
	Tetsu Suzuki	def.	Hiroyuki Tanaka	Decision (Unanimous)	3	5:00
	Hiroshi Nakamura	def.	Tenkei Oda	Decision (Majority)	2	5:00
	Hiroshige Tanaka	def.	Kenichiro Marui	KO (Punch)	1	3:01

== Shooto: Shooto Tradition 1 ==
Shooto: Shooto Tradition 1 was an event held on May 3, 2008 at Tokyo Dome City Hall in Tokyo, Japan.

=== Results ===
Main Card
Weight class				Method	Round	Time	Notes
Lightweight	Takashi Nakakura	def.	Ganjo Tentsuku	Decision (Unanimous)	3	5:00	(Note: For the Lightweight Championship.)
	David Baron	def.	Hayato Sakurai	Submission (Guillotine Choke)	1	4:50
	Akitoshi Tamura	def.	Rumina Sato	Submission (North-South Choke)	3	2:37
	Savant Young	def.	Takeshi Inoue	Decision (Unanimous)	2	5:00
	Yasuhiro Urushitani	vs.	Ryuichi Miki	Draw	3	5:00
	Yusuke Endo	def.	Vince Ortiz	Technical Submission (Rear Naked Choke)	1	3:34
	Bendy Casimir	def.	Shinji Sasaki	Decision (Unanimous)	3	5:00
	Hayate Usui	def.	Sakae Kasuya	Decision (Majority)	2	5:00
	Noboru Tahara	def.	Katsuya Murofushi	TKO (Cut)	2	0:46

== Shooto: Grapplingman 7 ==
Shooto: Grapplingman 7 was an event held on May 18, 2008 at Hiroshima Industrial Hall in Hiroshima, Japan.

=== Results ===
Main Card
Weight class				Method	Round	Time	Notes
	Kenichiro Togashi	vs.	Yutaka Ueda	Draw	2	5:00
	Kazuhiro Ito	def.	Daisuke Matsumoto	Submission (Rear Naked Choke)	2	3:21
	Tsuyoshi Okada	def.	Katsuhisa Akasaki	Decision (Unanimous)	2	5:00
	Takumi Ota	def.	Makoto Akazawa	Submission (Rear Naked Choke)	2	3:37
	Tatsuro Kamei	def.	Jun Nagasoe	Decision (Unanimous)	2	5:00
	Keita Yoshida	def.	Shunsuke Nomura	Decision (Unanimous)	2	5:00
	Yoshitaka Aki	def.	Teppei Masuda	Submission (Guillotine Choke)	2	3:03

== Shooto: Gig North 2 ==
Shooto: Gig North 2 was an event held on May 25, 2008 at Zepp Sapporo in Sapporo, Hokkaido, Japan.

=== Results ===
Main Card
Weight class				Method	Round	Time	Notes
	Tomonori Taniguchi	def.	Daisuke Ishizawa	Decision (Unanimous)	2	5:00
	Kunio Nakajima	def.	Hidekazu Asakura	Decision (Majority)	2	5:00
	Akihiko Adachi	def.	Nobuyasu Fujikawa	TKO (Punches)	2	1:00
	Fumihiro Kitahara	def.	Hayato Sato	Submission (Armbar)	2	2:46
	Yusuke Sato	def.	Tatsuya Yamamoto	KO (Flying Knee)	1	0:56
	Hiroki Kuga	def.	Yoshiki Noguchi	Decision (Unanimous)	2	5:00
	Atsushi Kobayashi	def.	Toshihiko Yokoyama	TKO (Punches)	1	3:48

== Shooto: Shooting Disco 5: Earth, Wind and Fighter ==
Shooto: Shooting Disco 5: Earth, Wind and Fighter was an event held on June 21, 2008 at Shinjuku Face in Tokyo, Japan.

=== Results ===
Main Card
Weight class				Method	Round	Time	Notes
	Junji Ikoma	vs.	Jin Akimoto	Draw	3	5:00
	So Tazawa	def.	Junya Kodo	Decision (Unanimous)	3	5:00
	Noboru Tahara	def.	Atsushi Takeuchi	Submission (Armbar)	2	3:26
	Yoshitaro Niimi	def.	Taisuke Okuno	Decision (Split)	2	5:00
	Eiji Murayama	def.	Yuji Inoue	Submission (Arm Triangle Choke)	1	4:40
	Seiji Ozuka	def.	Ayumu Shioda	KO (Knee)	2	0:59
	Daisuke Okumiya	vs.	Shin Kochiwa	Draw	2	5:00
	Hideki Nishino	def.	Kenichiro Marui	TKO (Punches)	1	0:52
	Hiroaki Ijima	def.	Nariyasu Fujita	Decision (Split)	2	5:00
	Nozomi Otsuka	def.	Yosuke Saruta	TKO (Corner Stoppage)	2	3:25

== Shooto: 6/26 in Kitazawa Town Hall ==
Shooto: 6/26 in Kitazawa Town Hall was an event held on June 26, 2008 at Kitazawa Town Hall in Setagaya, Tokyo, Japan.

=== Results ===
Main Card
Weight class				Method	Round	Time	Notes
	Homare Kuboyama	def.	Tatsuro Kamei	Decision (Unanimous)	2	5:00
	Hiroyuki Abe	def.	Kenichi Sawada	Submission (Armbar)	1	4:13
	Paolo Milano	vs.	Shinobu Miura	Draw	2	5:00
	Kosuke Eda	def.	Yuki Baba	Submission (Armbar)	2	2:31
	Issei Tamura	def.	Yasuhiro Kanayama	Decision (Unanimous)	2	5:00
	Masato Sannai	def.	Tatsuya Nakashima	Submission (Triangle Choke)	1	2:28
	Yasuko Mogi	def.	Ayumi Takeuchi	Submission (Rear-Naked Choke)	1	2:45
	Yasuko Tamada	def.	Kayo Nagayasu	Decision (Majority)	2	5:00

== Shooto: Shooto Tradition 2 ==
Shooto: Shooto Tradition 2 was an event held on July 18, 2008 at Korakuen Hall in Tokyo, Japan.

=== Results ===
Main Card
Weight class				Method	Round	Time	Notes
Flyweight	Shinichi Kojima (c)	def.	Mamoru Yamaguchi	Submission (Guillotine Choke)	3	3:42	(Note: For the Flyweight Championship.)
	Yusuke Endo	def.	Kenichiro Togashi	Decision (Unanimous)	3	5:00
	Akiyo Nishiura	def.	Matteus Lahdesmaki	TKO (Punches)	3	2:17
	Hiromasa Ougikubo	def.	Hiroyuki Tanaka	TKO (Punches)	1	1:35
	Shinji Sasaki	def.	Jin Kazeta	Submission (Rear-Naked Choke)	1	2:42
	Shinya Murofushi	def.	Takehiro Harusaki	Decision (Unanimous)	3	5:00
	Akihiro Yamazaki	def.	Naoki Hirayama	Decision (Majority)	2	5:00
	Takahiro Hosoi	def.	Nobuhiro Hayakawa	Submission (Triangle Choke)	2	1:31
	Haruo Ochi	def.	Yuta Nezu	Submission (Bulldog Choke)	1	3:42
	Naohiro Mizuno	def.	Taiki Tsuchiya	Decision (Majority)	2	5:00
	Ikuo Usuda	def.	Junpei Chikano	Submission (Rear-Naked Choke)	2	3:41

== Shooto: Gig Central 15 ==
Shooto: Gig Central 15 was an event held on August 3, 2008 at Zepp Nagoya in Nagoya, Aichi, Japan.

=== Results ===
Main Card
Weight class				Method	Round	Time	Notes
	Hatsu Hioki	vs.	Hiroshi Nakamura	Draw	3	5:00
	Takasuke Kume	vs.	Yoichiro Sato	Draw	2	5:00
	Takahiro Kajita	def.	Komei Okada	Decision (Unanimous)	2	5:00
	Akira Kibe	def.	Tsuyoshi Okada	Decision (Unanimous)	2	5:00
	Kenichi Hattori	def.	Hisaki Hiraishi	Decision (Unanimous)	2	5:00
	Hiroshi Sakamoto	def.	Keisuke Kurata	Decision (Unanimous)	2	5:00
	Teppei Masuda	def.	Kenya Kato	TKO	1	0:25
	Yukinari Tamura	def.	Kunio Nakajima	Decision (Unanimous)	2	5:00
	Keita Yoshida	def.	Yasuaki Nagamoto	Decision (Unanimous)	2	5:00
	Mikihito Yamagami	def.	Hiroyuki Kondo	Decision (Majority)	2	5:00

== Shooto: Gig West 10 ==
Shooto: Gig West 10 was an event held on September 20, 2008 at Azalea Taisho Hall in Osaka, Kansai, Japan.

=== Results ===
Main Card
Weight class				Method	Round	Time	Notes
	Tomokazu Yuasa	def.	Yoshifumi Dogaki	Decision (Unanimous)	2	5:00
	Takaaki Oban	def.	Yusaku Tanaka	Decision (Unanimous)	2	5:00
	Yoshihiko Oyama	vs.	Keita Yoshida	Draw	1	1:32
	Yukinari Tamura	vs.	Hiroshi Sugimoto	Draw	2	5:00
	Toshihiro Shimizu	def.	Toru Ishinaka	Submission (Rear-Naked Choke)	1	1:34
	Yasuaki Nagamoto	def.	Manabu Kano	Submission (Guillotine Choke)	1	2:12

== Shooto: Shooto Tradition 3 ==
Shooto: Shooto Tradition 3 was an event held on September 28, 2008 at Korakuen Hall in Tokyo, Japan.

=== Results ===
Main Card
Weight class				Method	Round	Time	Notes
Bantamweight	Masakatsu Ueda (c)	vs.	Marcos Galvao	Draw	3	5:00	(Note: For the Bantamweight Championship.)
	Yuki Shojo	def.	Yasuhiro Urushitani	Submission (Guillotine Choke)	3	3:39
	Shintaro Ishiwatari	def.	Tenkei Oda	TKO (Punches)	1	4:08
	Rambaa Somdet	def.	Noboru Tahara	Decision (Unanimous)	3	5:00
	Masaaki Sugawara	def.	Takuya Mori	Decision (Majority)	3	5:00
	Junji Ito	def.	Yoshitaka Aki	TKO (Punches)	1	4:01
	Atsushi Kobayashi	def.	Hiroshige Tanaka	TKO (Doctor Stoppage)	2	0:59
	Kentaro Watanabe	def.	Kota Funaki	Decision (Split)	2	5:00
	Takuya Sato	def.	Naoki Hirayama	Decision (Majority)	2	5:00

== Shooto: Shooting Disco 6: Glory Shines In You ==
Shooto: Shooting Disco 6: Glory Shines In You was an event held on October 5, 2008 at Shinjuku Face in Tokyo, Japan.

=== Results ===
Main Card
Weight class				Method	Round	Time	Notes
	Ryuichi Miki	def.	Jin Akimoto	Decision (Majority)	3	5:00
	Taisuke Okuno	def.	Yoichiro Sato	Decision (Unanimous)	2	5:00
	Daiji Takahashi	vs.	Seiji Ozuka	Draw	2	5:00
	Sakae Kasuya	def.	Hideki Nishino	Decision (Majority)	2	5:00
	Ayumu Shioda	def.	Kenji Hosoya	Decision (Unanimous)	2	5:00
	Taiki Tsuchiya	def.	Daisuke Matsumoto	KO (Knee)	1	4:57
	Takeshi Sato	def.	Nozomi Otsuka	Submission (Rear-Naked Choke)	1	2:41
	Guy Delumeau	def.	Hisaki Hiraishi	Decision (Unanimous)	2	5:00
	Mikihito Yamagami	def.	Yusuke Sato	KO (Punch)	2	0:18
	Fumihiro Kitahara	def.	Hiroaki Ijima	Decision (Split)	2	5:00
	Kosuke Eda	def.	Haruo Ochi	Decision (Unanimous)	2	5:00

== Shooto: 10/13 in Kitazawa Town Hall ==
Shooto: 10/13 in Kitazawa Town Hall was an event held on October 13, 2008 in Kitazawa, Japan.

=== Results ===
Main Card
Weight class				Method	Round	Time	Notes
	Junji Ikoma	def.	Yusei Shimokawa	Submission (Triangle Choke)	1	2:23
	Issei Tamura	def.	Takumi Ota	Decision (Majority)	2	5:00
	Ikuo Usuda	def.	Kazuya Satomoto	KO (Slam)	1	1:05
	Shinobu Miura	def.	Masakazu Taguchi	Decision (Unanimous)	2	5:00
	Shin Kochiwa	def.	Taijiro Iseki	TKO (Punches)	1	2:55
	Takeshi Numajiri	def.	Masumi Tozawa	Decision (Unanimous)	2	5:00

== Shooto: Gig Central 16 ==
Shooto: Gig Central 16 was an event held on October 26, 2008 at Tokai TV Telepia Hall in Nagoya, Aichi, Japan.

=== Results ===
Main Card
Weight class				Method	Round	Time	Notes
	Xavier Lucas	def.	Yoshitaro Niimi	Decision (Majority)	3	5:00
	Kenichi Hattori	def.	Masato Fujiwara	Decision (Majority)	2	5:00
	Hiroharu Matsufuji	def.	Hiroshi Sakamoto	Decision (Unanimous)	2	5:00
	Kenichi Sawada	vs.	Teppei Masuda	Draw	2	5:00
	Naohiro Mizuno	def.	Atsushi Kobayashi	Decision (Unanimous)	2	5:00
	Makoto Maeda	def.	Naoji Mikoshiba	KO (Punch)	2	3:39
	Mutsumi Kasai	def.	Kinuka Sasaki	Submission (Armbar)	2	3:53

== Shooto: Gig North 3 ==
Shooto: Gig North 3 was an event held on November 22, 2008 at Zepp Sapporo in Sapporo, Hokkaido, Japan.

=== Results ===
Main Card
Weight class				Method	Round	Time	Notes
	Junji Ikoma	vs.	Takuya Mori	Draw	3	5:00
	Tatsuya Yamamoto	def.	Kazuyuki Yoshida	Submission (Rear-Naked Choke)	1	2:09
	Taro Kusano	def.	Hidekazu Asakura	Decision (Unanimous)	2	5:00
	Tsuneo Kimura	def.	Michiyuki Ishibashi	Decision (Unanimous)	2	5:00
	Junpei Chikano	def.	Yoshiki Noguchi	Decision (Unanimous)	2	5:00
	Atsushi Mochizuki	def.	Takeshi Sato	Decision (Unanimous)	2	5:00
	Takashi Niikuni	def.	Toshiaki Hayasaka	Submission (Armbar)	2	4:03

== Shooto: Shooto Tradition 4 ==
Shooto: Shooto Tradition 4 was an event held on November 29, 2008 at Korakuen Hall in Tokyo, Japan.

=== Results ===
Main Card
Weight class				Method	Round	Time	Notes
Featherweight	Takeshi Inoue	def.	Hideki Kadowaki (c)	Decision (Unanimous)	3	5:00	(Note: For the Featherweight Championship.)
	Hatsu Hioki	def.	Rumina Sato	TKO (Punches)	1	3:32
	Takashi Nakakura	def.	Bendy Casimir	Submission (Rear-Naked Choke)	1	4:58
	So Tazawa	vs.	Hiromasa Ougikubo	Draw	3	5:00
	Yutaka Ueda	def.	Jin Kazeta	KO (Punches)	1	3:23
	Atsushi Takeuchi	def.	Katsuya Murofushi	Submission (Guillotine Choke)	2	1:44
	Taisuke Okuno	def.	Daisuke Okumiya	Decision (Unanimous)	2	5:00
	Yuta Nezu	vs.	Nobuhiro Hayakawa	Draw	2	5:00

== Shooto: The Rookie Tournament 2008 Final ==
Shooto: The Rookie Tournament 2008 Final was an event held on December 13, 2008 at Shinjuku Face in Tokyo, Japan.

=== Results ===
Main Card
Weight class				Method	Round	Time	Notes
	Guy Delumeau	def.	Paolo Milano	TKO (Punches)	2	4:09
	Mikihito Yamagami	def.	Junji Ito	Submission (Guillotine Choke)	2	2:15
	Issei Tamura	def.	Naohiro Mizuno	Decision (Unanimous)	2	5:00
	Kosuke Eda	def.	Yoshihiko Oyama	Submission (Rear-Naked Choke)	1	3:02
	Makoto Maeda	def.	Takaaki Oban	KO (Punch)	1	0:34
	Fumihiro Kitahara	def.	Kentaro Watanabe	Decision (Unanimous)	2	5:00
	Takuya Sato	vs.	Takasuke Kume	Draw	2	5:00
	Ikuo Usuda	def.	Yukinari Tamura	Decision (Unanimous)	2	5:00

== See also ==
- Shooto
- List of Shooto champions
- List of Shooto Events
