= Taisuke Okuno =

Japanese mixed martial artist (born 1977)

Taisuke Okuno 奥野泰舗
- Born: March 1, 1977 (age 49); Izumi, Osaka, Japan
- Other names: Goten
- Nationality: Japanese
- Height: 5 ft 10 in (1.78 m)
- Weight: 170 lb (77 kg; 12 st)
- Division: Middleweight; Welterweight; Lightweight
- Style: Karate, Boxing, Muay Thai
- Team: Cave
- Years active: 2005–present

Mixed martial arts record
- Total: 27
- Wins: 13
- By knockout: 10
- By decision: 3
- Losses: 12
- By knockout: 1
- By submission: 1
- By decision: 10
- Draws: 2

Other information
- Mixed martial arts record from Sherdog

Taisuke Okuno Japanese: 奥野泰舗 (born March 1, 1977) is a Japanese professional mixed martial artist currently competing in the Middleweight division. A professional competitor since 2005, he has competed for World Victory Road, Pancrase, DEEP, and Shooto.

== Shooto ==
At MMA debut in "Shooto – Shooter's Summer" Shooto event win Tsuneyoshi Kashimura.

== DEEP ==
Loss to Shigetoshi Iwase by unanimous decision at DEEP: 42 Impact, won Hidehiko Hasegawa by TKO at DEEP: 46 Impact.

Okuno fought Yuya Shirai for the Deep Welterweight Championship, he lost the fight via unanimous decision being controlled on the ground.

== Sengoku ==
Took part on Sengoku Welterweight Grand Prix. Defeated Nick Thompson in quarter final of grand prix, at Sengoku Raiden Championships 14. Loss to Yasubey Enomoto at semi-final of grand prix at World Victory Road Presents: Sengoku Raiden Championships 15.

== Mixed martial arts record ==
Professional record breakdown
27 matches	13 wins	12 losses
By knockout	10	1
By submission	0	1
By decision	3	10
Draws	2	

Res.	Record	Opponent	Method	Event	Date	Round	Time	Location	Notes
Loss	13–12–2	Tatsuya Mizuno	Submission (rear-naked choke)	DEEP: 82 Impact	February 24, 2018	3	4:34	Tokyo, Japan	Middleweight bout.
Loss	13–11–2	Ryuichiro Sumimura	Decision (unanimous)	DEEP: 78 Impact	March 18, 2017	3	5:00	Tokyo, Japan	
Win	13–10–2	Ryuta Sakurai	Decision (split)	Deep: Cage Impact 2016	October 18, 2016	3	5:00	Tokyo, Japan	Return to Welterweight.
Loss	12–10–2	Takasuke Kume	Decision (unanimous)	Pancrase 266	April 26, 2015	3	5:00	Tokyo, Japan	
Loss	12–9–2	Akira Okada	Technical Decision (split)	Pancrase: 263	December 6, 2014	2	0:32	Tokyo, Japan	Lightweight debut; Tournament Semifinals.
Loss	12–8–2	Yuta Watanabe	TKO (corner stoppage)	DEEP: 66 Impact	April 29, 2014	3	0:26	Tokyo, Japan	
Win	12–7–2	Akihiro Gono	KO (punch)	DEEP: 62 Impact	April 26, 2013	2	2:07	Tokyo, Japan	
Loss	11–7–2	Shigetoshi Iwase	Decision (unanimous)	DEEP: Cage Impact 2012: First Round	December 8, 2012	3	5:00	Tokyo, Japan	
Loss	11–6–2	Yuya Shirai	Decision (unanimous)	DEEP / Smash: Japan MMA League 2011 Semifinals	December 17, 2011	3	5:00	Tokyo, Japan	For the DEEP Welterweight Championship.
Win	11–5–2	Ryo Chonan	KO (punch)	World Victory Road Presents: Soul of Fight	December 30, 2010	1	0:19	Tokyo, Japan	Catchweight (80 kg) bout.
Loss	10–5–2	Yasubey Enomoto	Decision (unanimous)	World Victory Road Presents: Sengoku Raiden Championships 15	October 30, 2010	3	5:00	Tokyo, Japan	
Win	10–4–2	Nick Thompson	KO (punch)	World Victory Road Presents: Sengoku Raiden Championships 14	August 22, 2010	3	0:27	Tokyo, Japan	
Win	9–4–2	Hidehiko Hasegawa	TKO (punches)	DEEP: 46 Impact	February 28, 2010	1	4:09	Tokyo, Japan	
Win	8–4–2	Masaki Konishi	TKO (punches)	Shooto: Alternative 1	December 23, 2009	1	0:47	Osaka, Japan	
Draw	7–4–2	Takasuke Kume	Draw	Shooto: Gig Central 18	August 30, 2009	2	5:00	Nagoya, Aichi, Japan	
Loss	7–4–1	Shigetoshi Iwase	Decision (unanimous)	DEEP: 42 Impact	June 30, 2009	2	5:00	Tokyo, Japan	
Loss	7–3–1	Takuya Sato	Decision (unanimous)	Shooto: Shooting Disco 7: Young Man	January 31, 2009	2	5:00	Tokyo, Japan	
Win	7–2–1	Daisuke Okumiya	Decision (unanimous)	Shooto: Shooto Tradition 4	November 29, 2008	2	5:00	Tokyo, Japan	
Win	6–2–1	Yoichiro Sato	Decision (unanimous)	Shooto: Shooting Disco 6: Glory Shines In You	October 5, 2008	2	5:00	Tokyo, Japan	
Win	5–2–1	Masayoshi Ichikawa	KO (punch)	GCM: Demolition 080721	July 21, 2008	1	0:26	Japan	
Loss	4–2–1	Yoshitaro Niimi	Decision (split)	Shooto: Shooting Disco 5: Earth, Wind and Fighter	June 21, 2008	2	5:00	Tokyo, Japan	
Draw	4–1–1	Xavier Lucas	Draw	Shooto: Gig Central 14	March 16, 2008	2	5:00	Perth, Australia	
Win	4–1	Hirosumi Sugiura	TKO (doctor stoppage)	Shooto: Rookie Tournament 2007 Final	December 8, 2007	1	4:42	Tokyo, Japan	
Loss	3–1	Masaki Konishi	Decision (unanimous)	Shooto: Rookie Tournament Final	December 2, 2006	2	5:00	Tokyo, Japan	
Win	3–0	Mateus Irie Nechio	TKO (punches)	Shooto: Shooting Star	July 30, 2006	2	1:01	Setagaya, Tokyo, Japan	
Win	2–0	Hidekazu Asakura	TKO (punches)	Shooto: 3/3 in Kitazawa Town Hall	March 3, 2006	2	3:20	Setagaya, Tokyo, Japan	
Win	1–0	Tsuneyoshi Kashimura	TKO (punches)	Shooto: Shooter's Summer	July 14, 2005	2	2:40	Setagaya, Tokyo, Japan	
