= Shinichi Kojima =

Japanese martial artist (born 1979)

- Born: February 6, 1979 (age 47); Yokohama, Kanagawa, Japan
- Native name: 小島 伸一
- Other names: BJ
- Nationality: Japanese
- Height: 5 ft 4 in (1.63 m)
- Weight: 123 lb (56 kg; 8.8 st)
- Division: Flyweight
- Style: Wrestling
- Stance: Southpaw
- Team: Katsumura Dojo

Mixed martial arts record
- Total: 25
- Wins: 14
- By knockout: 2
- By submission: 7
- By decision: 5
- Losses: 6
- By submission: 1
- By decision: 5
- Draws: 5

Other information
- Mixed martial arts record from Sherdog

Shinichi Kojima (小島 伸一, Kojima Shin'ichi; born February 6, 1979) is a Japanese mixed martial artist. He has fought for most of his career in the Shooto organization.

== Mixed martial arts career ==
Kojima was the Shooto Bantamweight Champion from 2006 until 2010, when an ACL injury in his right knee prevented him from defending the title in the mandatory time period. Kojima had the most famous flyweight feud to date with former reigning champion Mamoru Yamaguchi.

=== ONE Fighting Championship ===
Kojima made his debut at the organization with a submission win over Filipino Rey Docyogen at ONE FC: Return of Warriors at Putra Indoor Stadium in Kuala Lumpur on February 2. With the win, Kojima will get a shot at the ONE FC World Flyweight Title.

Kojima was originally slated to fight former UFC vet and Shooto Bantamweight Champion Yasuhiro Urushitani for the inaugural ONE FC Flyweight Championship, but Urushitani was forced out of the bout due to injury and replaced with Andrew Leone. However, just days before the event, an injury to Leone scrapped the bout from the card all together, after leaving Kojima without an opponent for the event.

== Championships and accomplishments ==
- Fight Matrix
  - 2011 Comeback Fighter of the Year
- Shooto
  - Shooto Flyweight Championship (1 Time)
  - Three Successful Title Defenses
  - Most Successful Title Defenses in the history of the Flyweight Division (3)

== Mixed martial arts record ==
Professional record breakdown
25 matches	14 wins	6 losses
By knockout	2	0
By submission	7	1
By decision	5	5
Draws	5	

Res.	Record	Opponent	Method	Event	Date	Round	Time	Location	Notes
Win	14–6–5	Tatsuya So	Decision (split)	VTJ in Okinawa	October 3, 2015	3	5:00	Naha, Okinawa, Japan	
Loss	13–6–5	Andrew Leone	Decision (unanimous)	ONE FC: War of Nations	March 14, 2014	3	5:00	Kuala Lumpur, Malaysia	
Win	13–5–5	Rey Docyogen	Submission (guillotine choke)	ONE FC: Return of Warriors	February 2, 2013	2	4:47	Kuala Lumpur, Malaysia	
Loss	12–5–5	Nam Jin Jo	Decision (Majority)	Shooto: 3rd Round	March 10, 2012	3	5:00	Tokyo, Japan	
Win	12–4–5	Kiyotaka Shimizu	Decision (unanimous)	Shooto: Shooto the Shoot 2011	November 5, 2011	3	5:00	Tokyo, Japan	
Win	11–4–5	Masaaki Sugawara	Decision (split)	Shooto: Gig Tokyo 7	August 6, 2011	3	5:00	Tokyo, Japan	
Loss	10–4–5	Jussier Formiga	Decision (unanimous)	Shooto: Revolutionary Exchanges 1: Undefeated	July 19, 2009	3	5:00	Tokyo, Japan	Non-Title bout. Vacated Shooto Bantamweight (123 lbs.) Championship due to injury.
Win	10–3–5	Yuki Shoujou	Submission (rear-naked choke)	Shooto: Shooto Tradition 6	March 20, 2009	3	0:38	Tokyo, Japan	Defended Shooto Bantamweight (123 lbs.) Championship
Draw	9–3–5	Jesse Taitano	Draw	Shooto: Shooto Tradition 5	January 18, 2009	2	5:00	Tokyo, Japan	
Win	9–3–4	Mamoru Yamaguchi	Submission (guillotine choke)	Shooto: Shooto Tradition 2	July 18, 2008	3	3:42	Tokyo, Japan	Defended Shooto Bantamweight (123 lbs.) Championship
Loss	8–3–4	So Tazawa	Technical Submission (armbar)	Shooto: Back To Our Roots 7	January 26, 2008	3	3:32	Tokyo, Japan	
Loss	8–2–4	Eduardo Dantas	Decision (unanimous)	Shooto: Back To Our Roots 6	November 8, 2007	3	5:00	Tokyo, Japan	
Win	8–1–4	Yasuhiro Akagi	TKO (cut)	Shooto: Back To Our Roots 4	July 15, 2007	3	3:36	Tokyo, Japan	
Draw	7–1–4	Yasuhiro Urushitani	Draw	Shooto: Back To Our Roots 2	March 16, 2007	3	5:00	Tokyo, Japan	Defended Shooto Bantamweight (123 lbs.) Championship
Win	7–1–3	Mamoru Yamaguchi	Technical Submission (rear naked choke)	Shooto: Champion Carnival	October 14, 2006	1	1:38	Yokohama, Japan	Won Shooto Bantamweight (123 lbs.) Championship
Win	6–1–3	Yusei Shimokawa	Submission (rear naked choke)	Shooto 2006: 9/8 in Korakuen Hall	September 8, 2006	2	4:00	Tokyo, Japan	
Draw	5–1–3	Mamoru Yamaguchi	Draw	Shooto: 3/24 in Korakuen Hall	March 24, 2006	3	5:00	Tokyo, Japan	For Shooto Bantamweight (123 lb) Championship
Win	5–1–2	Setsu Iguchi	TKO (corner stoppage)	Shooto: 12/17 in Shinjuku Face	December 17, 2005	2	0:31	Tokyo, Japan	
Win	4–1–2	Chris MacGrath	Submission (rear naked choke)	Euphoria: USA vs. Japan	November 5, 2005	1	3:17	Atlantic City, New Jersey, United States	
Draw	3–1–2	Yasuhiro Urushitani	Draw	Shooto: 9/23 in Korakuen Hall	September 23, 2005	3	5:00	Tokyo, Japan	
Win	3–1–1	Daiji Takahashi	Decision (unanimous)	Shooto: 1/29 in Korakuen Hall	January 29, 2005	2	5:00	Tokyo, Japan	
Draw	2–1–1	Toshimichi Akagi	Draw	Shooto: Wanna Shooto 2004	November 12, 2004	2	5:00	Tokyo, Japan	
Win	2–1	Kenichi Sawada	Technical Submission (rear naked choke)	Shooto: 7/16 in Korakuen Hall	July 16, 2004	2	3:34	Tokyo, Japan	
Win	1–1	Takeshi Sato	Decision (unanimous)	Shooto: 3/22 in Korakuen Hall	March 22, 2004	2	5:00	Tokyo, Japan	
Loss	0–1	Junichi Sase	Decision (unanimous)	Shooto: Who is Young Leader!	October 31, 2003	2	5:00	Tokyo, Japan	
