= Yasuhiro Urushitani =

Japanese martial artist

- Born: Yasuhiro Urushitani; September 8, 1976 (age 50); Tokyo, Japan
- Nationality: Japanese
- Height: 5 ft 5 in (1.65 m)
- Weight: 125 lb (57 kg; 8 st 13 lb)
- Division: Flyweight (56 kg)
- Reach: 67 in (170 cm)
- Stance: Southpaw
- Fighting out of: Tokyo, Japan
- Team: Tribe Tokyo MMA; Wajyutsu Keisyukai Hearts
- Rank: Purple belt in Brazilian Jiu-Jitsu
- Years active: 2001-present

Mixed martial arts record
- Total: 34
- Wins: 21
- By knockout: 4
- By submission: 1
- By decision: 16
- Losses: 7
- By knockout: 1
- By submission: 2
- By decision: 4
- Draws: 6

Other information
- Mixed martial arts record from Sherdog

Yasuhiro Urushitani (漆谷康宏, Urushitani Yasuhiro; born September 8, 1976) is a Japanese mixed martial artist competing in the flyweight division. Urushitani held the Shooto bantamweight championship from 2010 to 2012 before vacating it to sign with the UFC. He was among the first flyweight fighters to fight in the UFC, Urushitani is currently signed to One Fighting Championship.

== Mixed martial arts career ==
=== Early career in Japan ===
Urushitani made his professional MMA debut for the Shooto promotion in January 2001 in his native Japan. Over the next decade, he amassed a record of 19 wins, 4 losses and 6 draws.

Urushitani competed for the Shooto Bantamweight (125 lbs; Flyweight in the United States) championship in 2003 and 2007, but lost both championship fights due to a decision and a draw, respectively. He eventually fought for the belt a third time, facing Ryuichi Miki in May 2010. He won the title via decision.

=== Ultimate Fighting Championship ===
Urushitani signed with the UFC to compete in a tournament to crown the newly minted UFC Flyweight Championship.

Urushitani faced Joseph Benavidez on March 3, 2012, at UFC on FX 2 in the semi-finals of the tournament. He lost the fight via TKO in the second round.

Urushitani was expected to face John Lineker on September 1, 2012, at UFC 151. However, after UFC 151 was cancelled, Urushitani/Lineker was rescheduled and took place on November 10, 2012, at UFC on Fuel TV 6. Urushitani lost the bout via unanimous decision. Urishitani was then released from the promotion.

=== ONE Fighting Championship ===
After Urushitani got released from the UFC he was signed by ONE FC. He debuted on their May 31, 2013, card ONE FC 9: Rise to Power against Rey Docyogen. He won the fight via split decision.

After two consecutive wins, Urushitani faced Brazilian Adriano Moraes at One FC 14: War of Nations. After winning the first round, Urushitani was taken down and submitted in the second round by rear naked choke.

== Championships and accomplishments ==
=== Mixed martial arts ===
- Shooto
  - Shooto Bantamweight Championship (One time; Vacated)

== Mixed martial arts record ==
Professional record breakdown
35 matches	21 wins	8 losses
By knockout	4	1
By submission	1	3
By decision	16	4
Draws	6	

Res.	Record	Opponent	Method	Event	Date	Round	Time	Location	Notes
Loss	21–8–6	Takumi Tamaru	Submission (armbar)	Shooto: Pacific Rim Double Championship	November 12, 2016	1	4:48	Tokyo, Japan	
Loss	21–7–6	Adriano Moraes	Submission (rear-naked choke)	ONE FC: War of Nations	March 14, 2014	2	3:48	Kuala Lumpur, Malaysia	
Win	21–6–6	Jae Nam Yoo	Decision (unanimous)	Deep: Tribe Tokyo Fight	October 20, 2013	3	5:00	Tokyo, Japan	
Win	20–6–6	Rey Docyogen	Decision (split)	ONE FC: Rise to Power	May 31, 2013	3	5:00	Pasay, Philippines	
Loss	19–6–6	John Lineker	Decision (unanimous)	UFC on Fuel TV: Franklin vs. Le	November 10, 2012	3	5:00	Macau, SAR, China	
Loss	19–5–6	Joseph Benavidez	TKO (punches)	UFC on FX: Alves vs. Kampmann	March 3, 2012	2	0:11	Sydney, Australia	UFC Flyweight tournament semifinal; First Flyweight fight in UFC history.
Win	19–4–6	Yuki Shoujou	TKO (head kick and punches)	Shooto: Shootor's Legacy 3	July 18, 2011	2	0:24	Tokyo, Japan	Defended the Shooto Bantamweight (123 lb) Championship.
Win	18–4–6	Takuya Mori	TKO (punches)	Shooto: The Way of Shooto 6: Like a Tiger, Like a Dragon	November 19, 2010	1	4:49	Tokyo, Japan	Non-title bout.
Win	17–4–6	Ryuichi Miki	Decision (unanimous)	Shooto: The Way of Shooto 3: Like a Tiger, Like a Dragon	May 30, 2010	3	5:00	Tokyo, Japan	Won the Shooto Bantamweight (123 lb) Championship.
Win	16–4–6	Ryuichi Miki	Decision (unanimous)	Shooto: Revolutionary Exchanges 2	September 22, 2009	3	5:00	Tokyo, Japan	
Win	15–4–6	Kiyotaka Shimizu	TKO (doctor stoppage)	Cage Force: EX Eastern Bound	November 8, 2008	1	5:00	Tokyo, Japan	
Loss	14–4–6	Yuki Shoujou	Submission (guillotine choke)	Shooto: Shooto Tradition 3	September 28, 2008	3	3:39	Tokyo, Japan	
Draw	14–3–6	Ryuichi Miki	Draw	Shooto: Shooto Tradition 1	May 3, 2008	3	5:00	Tokyo, Japan	
Draw	14–3–5	Jesse Taitano	Draw	GCM: Cage Force 5	Dec 1, 2007	3	5:00	Tokyo, Japan	
Win	14–3–4	Mamoru Yamaguchi	Decision (unanimous)	Shooto: Back To Our Roots 5	September 22, 2007	3	5:00	Tokyo, Japan	
Draw	13–3–4	Shinichi Kojima	Draw	Shooto: Back To Our Roots 2	March 16, 2007	3	5:00	Tokyo, Japan	For the Shooto Bantamweight (123 lb) Championship.
Win	13–3–3	Junji Ikoma	Decision (unanimous)	Shooto: 11/10 in Korakuen Hall	November 10, 2006	3	5:00	Tokyo, Japan	
Win	12–3–3	Daiji Takahashi	Decision (unanimous)	Shooto 2006: 9/8 in Korakuen Hall	September 8, 2006	3	5:00	Yokohama, Japan	
Win	11–3–3	Daniel Lima	Decision (unanimous)	MARS World Grand Prix	May 13, 2006	2	5:00	Seoul, South Korea	
Draw	10–3–3	Shinichi Kojima	Draw	Shooto: 9/23 in Korakuen Hall	September 23, 2005	3	5:00	Tokyo, Japan	
Win	10–3–2	Lorenzo Coca	KO (punch)	GCM: D.O.G 1	March 12, 2005	1	0:27	Tokyo, Japan	
Win	9–3–2	John Dodson	Decision (unanimous)	GCM: Demolition 041114	November 14, 2004	2	5:00	Tokyo, Japan	
Loss	8–3–2	Setsu Iguchi	Decision (unanimous)	GCM: Demolition 040919	September 19, 2004	2	5:00	Tokyo, Japan	
Win	8–2–2	Junji Ikoma	Decision (unanimous)	Shooto: 7/16 in Korakuen Hall	July 16, 2004	3	5:00	Tokyo, Japan	
Loss	7–2–2	Mamoru Yamaguchi	Decision (unanimous)	Shooto: Year End Show 2003	December 14, 2003	3	5:00	Tokyo, Japan	For the Shooto Bantamweight (123 lb) Championship.
Win	7–1–2	Robson Moura	Decision (split)	Shooto: 5/4 in Korakuen Hall	May 4, 2003	3	5:00	Tokyo, Japan	
Win	6–1–2	Masatoshi Abe	Decision (unanimous)	Shooto: Treasure Hunt 11	November 15, 2002	2	5:00	Tokyo, Japan	
Win	5–1–2	Tomohiro Hashi	Decision (unanimous)	Shooto: Gig East 10	August 27, 2002	2	5:00	Tokyo, Japan	
Win	4–1–2	Yasuhiro Akagi	Technical submission (kimura/triangle)	Shooto: Treasure Hunt 6	May 5, 2002	2	1:57	Tokyo, Japan	
Win	3–1–2	Masaru Gokita	Decision (unanimous)	Shooto: Treasure Hunt 4	March 13, 2002	2	5:00	Tokyo, Japan	
Draw	2–1–2	Naoki Deguchi	Draw	GCM: The Contenders X-Rage 1	September 14, 2001	2	5:00	Tokyo, Japan	
Win	2–1–1	Katsuhisa Akasaki	Decision (majority)	Shooto: To The Top 10	September 27, 2001	2	5:00	Tokyo, Japan	
Draw	1–1–1	Atsunori Hiruma	Decision (unanimous)	GCM: Club Contenders 1	August 15, 2001	2	3:00	Tokyo, Japan	
Win	1–1	Homare Kuboyama	Decision (unanimous)	Shooto: To The Top 3	March 21, 2001	2	5:00	Tokyo, Japan	
Loss	0–1	Daiji Takahashi	Decision (unanimous)	Shooto: To The Top 1	Jan 19, 2001	2	5:00	Tokyo, Japan	
