= Yukinari Tamura =

Japanese mixed martial arts fighter

- Born: May 12, 1981 (age 45); Japan
- Other names: Hibiki
- Nationality: Japanese
- Height: 177 cm (5 ft 10 in)
- Weight: 77 kg (170 lb; 12 st 2 lb)
- Division: Welterweight; Lightweight
- Team: Paraestra Osaka
- Years active: 2004-present

Mixed martial arts record
- Total: 40
- Wins: 16
- By knockout: 3
- By submission: 5
- By decision: 8
- Losses: 15
- By knockout: 4
- By submission: 4
- By decision: 7
- Draws: 9

Other information
- Mixed martial arts record from Sherdog

Yukinari Tamura (born May 12, 1981) is a Japanese mixed martial artist who competes for Shooto. A professional who began his career in 2004, he has also competed for DEEP, Pancrase, and Rizin.

== Mixed martial arts record ==
Professional record breakdown
40 matches	16 wins	15 losses
By knockout	3	4
By submission	5	4
By decision	8	7
Draws	9	

Res.	Record	Opponent	Method	Event	Date	Round	Time	Location	Notes
Loss	16–15–9	Hernani Perpetuo	TKO (upkick and punches)	Shooto Brasil 120	November 24, 2023	1	1:30	Rio de Janeiro, Brazil	
Loss	16–14–9	Daichi Abe	Decision (unanimous)	Rizin 39	October 23, 2022	3	5:00	Fukuoka, Japan	
Win	16–13–9	Souki Toyama	KO (punches)	Shooto Torao 27	May 15, 2022	2	3:15	Fukuoka, Japan	Won the Shooto Pacific Rim Shooto Welterweight Championship.
Loss	15–13–9	Souki Toyama	Decision (split)	Shooto Torao 24	June 16, 2019	3	5:00	Fukuoka, Japan	For the vacant Shooto Pacific Rim Welterweight Championship.
Win	15–12–9	Will Chope	Submission (kneebar)	Shooto Torao 21	September 10, 2017	2	4:40	Fukuoka, Japan	Return to Welterweight.
Win	14–12–9	Bayzet Khatkhokhu	Decision (unanimous)	Road to Abu Dhabi Warriors: Thailand	August 12, 2016	3	5:00	Bangkok, Thailand	
Loss	13–12–9	Kimihiro Eto	Decision (majority)	DEEP: 76 Impact	June 26, 2016	2	5:00	Tokyo, Japan	
Draw	13–11–9	Luiz Andrade I	Draw (majority)	DEEP Cage Impact 2015	August 29, 2015	2	5:00	Tokyo, Japan	
Loss	13–11–8	Shigetoshi Iwase	TKO (punches)	DEEP: 70 Impact	December 21, 2014	2	3:40	Tokyo, Japan	
Draw	13–10–8	Yoichi Fukumoto	Draw (unanimous)	DEEP: 68 Impact	August 23, 2014	2	5:00	Tokyo, Japan	
Loss	13–10–7	Alexander Sarnavskiy	Submission (rear-naked choke)	Ural Fight League: Resurrection	May 24, 2014	3	4:54	Ekaterinburg, Russia	
Win	13–9–7	Shinichiro Tanaka	Submission (triangle choke)	DEEP: Osaka Impact 2014	February 23, 2014	1	0:39	Osaka, Japan	
Draw	12–9–7	Juri Ohara	Draw (majority)	DEEP: Cage Impact 2013	November 24, 2013	2	5:00	Tokyo, Japan	Return to Lightweight.
Win	12–9–6	Ryuichiro Sumimura	Decision (majority)	DEEP: Osaka Impact 2013	April 28, 2013	3	5:00	Osaka, Japan	
Win	11–9–6	Kenta Takagi	Decision (unanimous)	Shooto: 10th Round	September 30, 2012	3	5:00	Tokyo, Japan	
Win	10–9–6	Tomokazu Yuasa	Decision (unanimous)	Shooto: Gig West 14	July 8, 2012	2	5:00	Osaka, Kansai, Japan	Return to Welterweight.
Loss	9–9–6	Yusuke Hoshiko	Decision (unanimous)	Rising On: Kyushu	May 20, 2012	3	5:00	Kumamoto, Japan	For the vacant ROFC Lightweight Championship.
Loss	9–8–6	Keiichiro Yamamiya	Decision (majority)	Pancrase: Progress Tour 1	January 28, 2012	2	5:00	Tokyo, Japan	
Draw	9–7–6	Masahiro Toryu	Draw (majority)	Pancrase: Impressive Tour 12	November 27, 2011	2	5:00	Osaka, Osaka, Japan	
Loss	9–7–5	A-Sol Kwon	KO (knee)	Heat: Heat 18	June 5, 2011	1	0:31	Osaka, Japan	
Loss	9–6–5	Isao Kobayashi	Decision (split)	Pancrase: Impressive Tour 4	May 3, 2011	2	3:00	Tokyo, Japan	
Loss	9–5–5	Kotetsu Boku	Decision (unanimous)	Shooto: Shootor's Legacy 1	January 10, 2011	3	5:00	Tokyo, Japan	
Win	9–4–5	Tony Hervey	Submission (rear-naked choke)	KOTC: Sniper	August 5, 2010	1	2:25	San Bernardino, California, United States	
Loss	8–4–5	Daisuke Sugie	Submission (armbar)	Shooto: Border: Season 2: Vibration	March 28, 2010	2	4:09	Osaka, Kansai, Japan	
Win	8–3–5	Hiroshi Shiba	Decision (unanimous)	Shooto: Alternative 1	December 23, 2009	2	5:00	Osaka, Kansai, Japan	
Win	7–3–5	Shinji Sasaki	Decision (unanimous)	Shooto: Revolutionary Exchanges 1: Undefeated	July 19, 2009	2	5:00	Tokyo, Japan	
Draw	6–3–5	Guy Delumeau	Draw	Shooto: Shooting Disco 9: Superman	June 6, 2009	2	5:00	Tokyo, Japan	
Loss	6–3–4	Kazuya Satomoto	TKO (doctor stoppage)	Shooto: Border: Season 1: Outbreak	March 8, 2009	2	1:10	Osaka, Kansai, Japan	
Loss	6–2–4	Ikuo Usuda	Decision (unanimous)	Shooto: The Rookie Tournament 2008 Final	December 13, 2008	2	5:00	Tokyo, Japan	
Draw	6–1–4	Hiroshi Sugimoto	Draw	Shooto: Gig West 10	September 20, 2008	2	5:00	Osaka, Kansai, Japan	
Win	6–1–3	Kunio Nakajima	Decision (unanimous)	Shooto: Gig Central 15	August 3, 2008	2	5:00	Nagoya, Aichi, Japan	
Win	5–1–3	Taro Kusano	Decision (majority)	Shooto: Gig West 9	March 15, 2008	2	5:00	Osaka, Kansai, Japan	
Win	4–1–3	Naoki Matsushita	TKO (doctor stoppage)	DEEP: Protect Impact 2007	December 22, 2007	2	3:46	Osaka, Japan	
Win	3–1–3	William Animal	Submission (punches)	DEEP: 30 Impact	July 8, 2007	1	4:36	Osaka, Japan	
Loss	2–1–3	Milton Vieira	Submission (rear-naked choke)	Real Rhythm: 5th Stage	November 18, 2006	2	2:34	Osaka, Japan	
Win	2–0–3	Noritaka Sasamoto	Submission (armbar)	Real Rhythm: 4th Stage	July 30, 2006	1	4:39	Osaka, Japan	
Draw	1–0–3	Kenichi Hattori	Draw (unanimous)	DEEP: clubDEEP Nagoya: MB3z Impact, Di Entrare	May 21, 2006	2	5:00	Nagoya, Japan	
Win	1–0–2	Katsunori Kikuno	Decision (unanimous)	DEEP: 23 Impact	February 5, 2006	2	5:00	Tokyo, Japan	
Draw	0–0–2	Maurcio Ishizuka	Draw (time limit)	DEEP: clubDEEP Osaka	November 28, 2004	2	5:00	Osaka, Japan	
Draw	0–0–1	Tomoyoshi Matsumoto	Draw	RZ: Red Zone 9	October 3, 2004	3	3:00	Osaka, Japan	

== See also ==
- List of male mixed martial artists
