= Guy Delumeau =

American mixed martial arts fighter

- Born: August 18, 1981 (age 45); Honolulu, Hawaii, United States
- Height: 5 ft 7 in (1.70 m)
- Weight: 155 lb (70 kg; 11.1 st)
- Division: Featherweight; Lightweight
- Fighting out of: Setagaya, Tokyo, Japan
- Team: Gutsman
- Years active: 2004 - 2015

Mixed martial arts record
- Total: 38
- Wins: 22
- By knockout: 7
- By submission: 4
- By decision: 11
- Losses: 13
- By knockout: 6
- By submission: 2
- By decision: 5
- Draws: 3

Other information
- Mixed martial arts record from Sherdog

Guy Delumeau (born August 18, 1981) is an American mixed martial artist currently competing in the Lightweight division.

== Personal life ==
Delumeau attended Pacific University.

== Mixed martial arts record ==
Professional record breakdown
38 matches	22 wins	13 losses
By knockout	7	6
By submission	4	2
By decision	11	5
Draws	3	

Res.	Record	Opponent	Method	Event	Date	Round	Time	Location	Notes
Win	22-13-3	Juri Ohara	Decision (majority)	DEEP: 81 Impact	December 23, 2017	2	5:00	Tokyo, Japan	Return to Lightweight.
Loss	21-13-3	Hiroto Uesako	TKO (punches)	DEEP: 78 Impact	March 18, 2017	2	0:23	Tokyo, Japan	
Loss	21-12-3	Nazareno Malegarie	Decision (unanimous)	Pancrase: 281	October 2, 2016	3	5:00	Tokyo, Japan	
Win	21-11-3	Satoshi Inaba	Submission (twister)	Pancrase: 279	July 24, 2016	1	1:40	Tokyo, Japan	
Loss	20-11-3	Juntaro Ushiku	TKO (knee injury)	Pancrase: 266	October 4, 2015	2	0:40	Tokyo, Japan	
Loss	20-10-3	Hiroyuki Takaya	TKO (punches)	Pancrase: 266	April 26, 2015	3	4:11	Tokyo, Japan	
Win	20-9-3	Akitoshi Tamura	Decision (split)	Pancrase: 264	February 1, 2015	3	5:00	Tokyo, Japan	
Win	19-9-3	Tomonari Kanomata	Decision (unanimous)	Pancrase: 260	August 10, 2014	3	5:00	Tokyo, Japan	
Loss	18-9-3	Yuki Baba	TKO (knee)	Pancrase: 257	March 30, 2014	1	0:30	Yokohama, Kanagawa, Japan	
Win	18-8-3	Hiroyuki Oshiro	Decision (majority)	Pancrase: 255	December 8, 2013	2	5:00	Tokyo, Japan	
Win	17-8-3	Yojiro Uchimura	Submission (guillotine choke)	Pancrase: 248	June 30, 2013	2	2:28	Tokyo, Japan	
Loss	16-8-3	Dustin Kimura	KO (punch)	PXC: Pacific Xtreme Combat 34	November 17, 2012	3	4:44	Quezon City, National Capital Region, Philippines	
Loss	16-7-3	Jon Shores	Decision (unanimous)	Pancrase: Progress Tour 9	August 5, 2012	3	5:00	Tokyo, Japan	
Win	16-6-3	Yo Saito	KO (slam)	Pancrase: Progress Tour 7	June 2, 2012	1	0:21	Tokyo, Japan	
Draw	15-6-3	Wataru Miki	Draw (split)	Shooto: Survivor Tournament Final	January 8, 2012	3	5:00	Tokyo, Japan	
Win	15-6-2	Issei Tamura	Decision (majority)	Shooto: Shooto the Shoot 2011	November 5, 2011	3	5:00	Tokyo, Japan	
Win	14-6-2	Yuta Sasaki	Decision (unanimous)	Shooto: Shootor's Legacy 4	September 23, 2011	3	5:00	Tokyo, Japan	
Win	13-6-2	Yusuke Yachi	Decision (unanimous)	Shooto: Gig Tokyo 6	May 28, 2011	2	5:00	Tokyo, Japan	
Draw	12-6-2	Wataru Miki	Draw	Shooto: Gig Tokyo 5	August 7, 2010	2	5:00	Tokyo, Japan	Featherweight debut.
Loss	12-6-1	Shinji Sasaki	Technical submission (armbar)	Shooto: Grapplingman 10	April 4, 2010	1	2:54	Okayama, Japan	
Win	12-5-1	Mateus Irie Nechio	Decision (unanimous)	Shooto: The Rookie Tournament 2009 Final	December 13, 2009	2	5:00	Tokyo, Japan	
Win	11-5-1	Jin Kazeta	Decision (unanimous)	Shooto: Gig Tokyo 3	October 18, 2009	2	5:00	Tokyo, Japan	
Win	10-5-1	Komei Okada	KO (punch)	Shooto: Gig Saitama 1	August 9, 2009	2	3:44	Fujimi, Saitama, Japan	
Draw	9-5-1	Yukinari Tamura	Draw	Shooto: Shooting Disco 9: Superman	June 6, 2009	2	5:00	Tokyo, Japan	
Loss	9-5	Ikuo Usuda	Decision (majority)	Shooto: Shooting Disco 8: We Are Tarzan!	April 10, 2009	2	5:00	Tokyo, Japan	
Win	9-4	Kunio Nakajima	Submission (rear-naked choke)	Shooto: Shooting Disco 7: Young Man	January 31, 2009	2	1:33	Tokyo, Japan	
Win	8-4	Paolo Milano	TKO (punches)	Shooto: The Rookie Tournament 2008 Final	December 13, 2008	2	4:09	Tokyo, Japan	
Win	7-4	Hisaki Hiraishi	Decision (unanimous)	Shooto: Shooting Disco 6: Glory Shines In You	October 5, 2008	2	5:00	Tokyo, Japan	
Loss	6-4	Kazuya Hirose	KO (spinning back fist)	DEEP: clubDEEP Tokyo	May 24, 2008	1	1:40	Tokyo, Japan	
Win	6-3	Hideo Matsui	TKO (punches)	DEEP: clubDEEP Tokyo	March 29, 2008	2	4:02	Tokyo, Japan	
Loss	5-3	Shinobu Miura	Decision (majority)	Shooto: Shooting Disco 3: Everybody Fight Now	October 20, 2007	2	5:00	Tokyo, Japan	
Loss	5-2	Hiroshi Shiba	Submission (triangle choke)	Shooto: Shooting Disco 1: Saturday Night Hero	June 2, 2007	1	1:58	Tokyo, Japan	
Loss	5-1	Toshikazu Iseno	Decision (unanimous)	Shooto: Battle Mix Tokyo 2	March 30, 2007	2	5:00	Tokyo, Japan	
Win	5-0	Minoru Tavares	TKO (punches)	DEEP: 27 Impact	December 20, 2006	2	3:58	Tokyo, Japan	
Win	4-0	Kenta Okuyama	TKO (injury)	DEEP: clubDEEP Tokyo: Future King Tournament 2006	December 9, 2006	1	0:38	Tokyo, Japan	
Win	3-0	Yuta Nabekubo	Decision (unanimous)	DEEP: clubDEEP Tokyo: Future King Tournament 2006	December 9, 2006	2	5:00	Tokyo, Japan	
Win	2-0	Atsushi Hyuga	KO (punch)	DEEP: clubDEEP Tokyo: Future King Tournament 2006	December 9, 2006	1	0:05	Tokyo, Japan	
Win	1-0	Michiyuki Ishibashi	Submission (straight armbar)	G-Shooto: G-Shooto Special03	November 19, 2006	2	2:15	Tokyo, Japan	

=== Mixed martial arts amateur record ===
Amateur record breakdown		
2 matches	2 wins	0 losses
By submission	2	0

Res.	Record	Opponent	Method	Event	Date	Round	Time	Location	Notes
Win	2-0	Brad Horner	Submission	SF 4: Fight For Freedom	June 26, 2004	2	N/A	Gresham, Oregon, United States	
Win	1-0	Jesse Hamm	Submission	FCFF: Rumble at the Roseland 13	June 19, 2004	1	N/A	Portland, Oregon, United States	

== See also ==
- List of male mixed martial artists
