= Junji Ikoma =

Japanese mixed martial artist

- Born: Junji Ikoma; April 8, 1970 (age 56); Higashiosaka, Osaka, Japan
- Native name: 生駒純司
- Nationality: Japanese
- Height: 5 ft 7 in (1.70 m)
- Weight: 114 lb (52 kg)
- Division: Strawweight; Flyweight
- Style: Judo
- Stance: Orthodox
- Fighting out of: Osaka, Japan
- Team: Chokushinkai
- Years active: 2001 - present

Mixed martial arts record
- Total: 34
- Wins: 14
- By knockout: 1
- By submission: 9
- By decision: 4
- Losses: 14
- By knockout: 3
- By submission: 2
- By decision: 9
- Draws: 6

Other information
- Mixed martial arts record from Sherdog

Junji Ikoma (Japanese: 生駒純司)is a retired Japanese mixed martial artist from Osaka, Japan, who competed in the strawweight and flyweight division. He has fought throughout his career exclusively for the Shooto organization and is currently a part of Shooto's provisional association. Ikoma is a former Shooto World Flyweight (114 lb) Champion. Fight Matrix ranks him as the #15 all time strawweight.

== Martial arts career ==
Ikoma made his debut aged 31, during Shooto - To The Top 5, when he faced Homare Kuboyama in the 123 lbs category. He lost a unanimous decision. He would lose again against Tomohiro Hashi. He bounced back with a win against Toshiteru Ishii, but lost his next fight against Masatoshi Abe.

From there he went on a five fight unbeaten streak, with a 4-0-1 record, beating Yasuhiro Akagi by RNC, Tomohiro Hashi by kimura in a rematch, drawing against Masatoshi Abe, and further beating Hiroaki Yoshioka and Takeyasu Hirono.

Ikoma lost a UD when he faced Robson Moura, won against Ichaku Murata by a triangle choke. He lost another UD against Yasuhiro Urushitani, and beat Homare Kuboyama by TKO. After accumulating a 2-3 record, he went on another five fight unbeaten streak, most notably drawing Jin Akimoto twice. His fights against Akimoto marked his 115 lbs debut.

Over the next two years he achieved a 1-3-2 record, but was nonetheless given a chance to fight for the Shooto World Flyweight (114 lb) Championship, after Rambaa Somdet vacated the title, following a left biceps injury. Ikoma won his first major career title at the age of 41, ten years after his pro debut. He was subsequently scheduled to make his first title defense against Mikihito Yamagami. Ikoma lost in the first minute, of the first round, by way of KO.

Junji Ikoma's last fight was in 2012, when he lost against Tadaaki Yamamoto, through a second round rear naked choke. He announced his retirement after the fight.

== Championships and accomplishments ==
- Shooto
  - 2000 West Japan Amateur Shooto Tournament Featherweight (132 lbs) Championship
  - 2001 Chubu Amateur Shooto Tournament Bantamweight (123 lbs) Championship
  - Shooto World Flyweight (114 lb) Championship (One time)

== Mixed martial arts record ==
Professional record breakdown
| 34 matches | 14 wins | 14 losses |
| By knockout | 1 | 3 |
| By submission | 9 | 2 |
| By decision | 4 | 9 |
| Draws | 6 | |

| Res. | Record | Opponent | Method | Event | Date | Round | Time | Location | Notes |
|---|---|---|---|---|---|---|---|---|---|
| Loss | 14-14-6 | Tadaaki Yamamoto | Submission (rear naked choke) | Shooto: Border: Season 4: First | April 1, 2012 | 2 | 1:13 | Osaka, Japan | |
| Loss | 14-13-6 | Mikihito Yamagami | KO (punch) | Shooto: Shooto the Shoot 2011 | November 5, 2011 | 1 | 0:41 | Tokyo, Japan | Lost Shooto Flyweight (114 lbs) Championship |
| Win | 14-12-6 | Junji Ito | Decision (unanimous) | Shooto: Shooto Tradition 2011 | April 29, 2011 | 3 | 5:00 | Tokyo, Japan | Wins Shooto Flyweight (114 lbs) Championship |
| Draw | 13-12-6 | Takeshi Sato | Draw | Shooto: Border: Season 3: Spring Thunder | April 3, 2011 | 3 | 5:00 | Osaka, Japan | |
| Win | 13-12-5 | Teppei Masuda | Submission (triangle choke) | Shooto: Border: Season 2: Immovable | December 26, 2010 | 1 | 2:12 | Osaka, Japan | |
| Draw | 12-12-5 | Atsushi Takeuchi | Draw | Shooto: Gig West 12 | September 26, 2010 | 3 | 5:00 | Osaka, Japan | |
| Loss | 12-12-4 | Noboru Tahara | TKO (punches) | Shooto: Border: Season 2: Vibration | March 28, 2010 | 3 | 3:31 | Osaka, Japan | |
| Loss | 12-11-4 | Ayumu Shioda | Submission (armbar) | Shooto: Border: Season 1: Clash | October 4, 2009 | 2 | 3:49 | Osaka, Japan | |
| Loss | 12-10-4 | Ryuichi Miki | Decision (unanimous) | Shooto: Shooto Tradition Final | April 10, 2009 | 3 | 5:00 | Tokyo, Japan | |
| Win | 12-9-4 | Fumihiro Kitahara | Decision (majority) | Shooto: Border: Season 1: Outbreak | March 8, 2009 | 2 | 5:00 | Osaka, Japan | |
| Draw | 11-9-4 | Takuya Mori | Draw | Shooto: Gig North 3 | November 22, 2008 | 3 | 5:00 | Sapporo, Japan | |
| Win | 11-9-3 | Yusei Shimokawa | Submission (triangle choke) | Shooto: 10/13 in Kitazawa Town Hall | October 13, 2008 | 1 | 2:23 | Tokyo, Japan | |
| Draw | 10-9-3 | Jin Akimoto | Draw | Shooto: Shooting Disco 5: Earth, Wind and Fighter | June 21, 2008 | 3 | 5:00 | Tokyo, Japan | |
| Draw | 10-9-2 | Jin Akimoto | Draw | Shooto: Back To Our Roots 7 | January 26, 2008 | 3 | 5:00 | Tokyo, Japan | Strawweight debut |
| Loss | 10-9-1 | Yuki Shojo | Decision (unanimous) | Shooto: Shooting Disco 3: Everybody Fight Now | October 20, 2007 | 2 | 5:00 | Tokyo, Japan | |
| Win | 10-8-1 | Toshimichi Akagi | Decision (split) | Shooto: Battle Mix Tokyo 2 | March 30, 2007 | 2 | 5:00 | Tokyo, Japan | |
| Loss | 9-8-1 | Yasuhiro Urushitani | Decision (unanimous) | Shooto: 11/10 in Korakuen Hall | November 10, 2006 | 3 | 5:00 | Tokyo, Japan | |
| Loss | 9-7-1 | Masatoshi Abe | TKO (eye injury) | Shooto 2006: 7/21 in Korakuen Hall | July 21, 2006 | 1 | 2:06 | Tokyo, Japan | |
| Win | 9-6-1 | Daiji Takahashi | Submission (triangle choke) | Shooto: 3/24 in Korakuen Hall | March 24, 2006 | 3 | 3:50 | Tokyo, Japan | |
| Win | 8-6-1 | Hiroaki Yoshioka | Submission (rear naked choke) | Shooto: 5/8 in Osaka Prefectural Gymnasium | May 8, 2005 | 3 | 1:36 | Osaka, Japan | |
| Loss | 7-6-1 | Mamoru Yamaguchi | Decision (unanimous) | Shooto: 1/29 in Korakuen Hall | January 29, 2005 | 3 | 5:00 | Tokyo, Japan | |
| Win | 7-5-1 | Homare Kuboyama | TKO (cut) | Shooto: Rookie Tournament 2004 Final | November 25, 2004 | 1 | 3:57 | Tokyo, Japan | |
| Loss | 6-5-1 | Yasuhiro Urushitani | Decision (unanimous) | Shooto: 7/16 in Korakuen Hall | July 16, 2004 | 3 | 5:00 | Tokyo, Japan | |
| Win | 6-4-1 | Ichaku Murata | Submission (triangle choke) | Shooto 2004: 4/11 in Osaka Prefectural Gymnasium | April 11, 2004 | 2 | 1:16 | Osaka, Japan | |
| Loss | 5-4-1 | Robson Moura | Decision (unanimous) | Shooto: Year End Show 2003 | December 14, 2003 | 3 | 5:00 | Urayasu, Japan | |
| Win | 5-3-1 | Takeyasu Hirono | Decision (unanimous) | Shooto: Who is Young Leader! | October 31, 2003 | 3 | 5:00 | Tokyo, Japan | |
| Win | 4-3-1 | Hiroaki Yoshioka | Technical Submission (rear naked choke) | Shooto: 8/10 in Yokohama Cultural Gymnasium | August 10, 2003 | 2 | 3:26 | Yokohama, Japan | |
| Draw | 3-3-1 | Masatoshi Abe | Draw | Shooto: 5/4 in Korakuen Hall | May 4, 2003 | 2 | 5:00 | Tokyo, Japan | |
| Win | 3-3 | Tomohiro Hashi | Submission (kimura) | Shooto: 3/18 in Korakuen Hall | March 18, 2003 | 1 | 3:20 | Tokyo, Japan | |
| Win | 2-3 | Yasuhiro Akagi | Submission (rear-naked choke) | Shooto: Gig Central 2 | October 6, 2002 | 1 | 4:41 | Aichi, Japan | |
| Loss | 1-3 | Masatoshi Abe | Decision (majority) | Shooto: Treasure Hunt 8 | July 19, 2002 | 2 | 5:00 | Tokyo, Japan | |
| Win | 1-2 | Toshiteru Ishii | Technical Submission (kimura) | Shooto: Treasure Hunt 2 | January 25, 2002 | 1 | 2:35 | Tokyo, Japan | |
| Loss | 0-2 | Tomohiro Hashi | Decision (unanimous) | Shooto: Gig West 2 | September 23, 2001 | 2 | 5:00 | Tokyo, Japan | |
| Loss | 0-1 | Homare Kuboyama | Decision (unanimous) | Shooto: To The Top 5 | June 30, 2001 | 2 | 5:00 | Tokyo, Japan | Flyweight debut |

== See also ==
- List of male mixed martial artists
