= Takeshi Sato =

Japanese professional wrestler

Personal information
- Born: June 8, 1981 (age 45) Tokyo, Japan

Professional wrestling career
- Ring name(s): Go; Toshiyuki Sato; Takeshi Sato
- Billed height: 1.78 m (5 ft 10 in)
- Billed weight: 84 kg (185 lb)
- Trained by: Dragon Gate Dojo
- Debut: January 20, 2007

Takeshi Sato (born June 8, 1981) is a Japanese professional wrestler, signed to Pro Wrestling Secret Base.

== Biography ==
He debuted in 2005 in Dragon Gate. He wrestled in exhibition matches with Yamato Onodera/YAMATO until the summer of 2006. He was thought to have retired but turned up in El Dorado Wrestling in January 2007 as Go. He quickly gained a strong fan base & joined Shuji Kondo's SUKIYAKI stable at first. He then betrayed him & joined the HELL DEMONS faction. Go and the Brahman brothers faced Toru Owashi, Takuya Sugawara and Nobutaka Araya for the vacant UWA World Trios Championship but did not win the belts.

== Championships and accomplishments ==
Pro Wrestling Secret Base
- Captain of the Secret Base Openweight Championship (2 times)
- Captain of the Secret Base Openweight Tag Team Championship (1 time) – with Amigo Suzuki

== Mixed martial arts record ==
Res.	Record	Opponent	Method	Event	Date	Round	Time	Location	Notes
Draw	0–0–1	Hikaru Sato	Draw	Kingdom of Grapple: Live 2007	November 25, 2007	2	5:00	Tokyo, Japan	
