= Junya Kodo =

Japanese MMA fighter

Junya Kodo 鼓童淳也
- Born: Kodo, Junya; March 24, 1983 (age 43); Fukui Prefecture, Japan
- Other names: KODO
- Nationality: Japanese
- Height: 5 ft 4 in (163 cm)
- Weight: 123 lb (56 kg)
- Division: Flyweight (125 lb)
- Style: Judo, Wrestling
- Fighting out of: Hyogo, Japan
- Team: Shooto Gym Kobe
- Years active: 2006–present

Mixed martial arts record
- Total: 19
- Wins: 10
- By knockout: 3
- By submission: 2
- By decision: 5
- Losses: 7
- By submission: 5
- By decision: 2
- Draws: 2

Other information
- Mixed martial arts record from Sherdog

Junya Kodo Japanese: 鼓童淳也 (born March 24, 1983) is a Japanese mixed martial artist currently fighting in the Flyweight division of Shooto organization. Kodo is also the head coach and representative of Shooto Gym Kobe. KODO replaced Norifumi Yamamoto in 2 days notice to fight Joseph Benavidez on DREAM 5 Lightweight GP Final 2008.

KODO was ranked 3 in Japan Amateur Shooto Championships then going on to be Kansai Amateur Shooto Champion securing his rank as a professional A-Class Shooter.

== Early career ==
Kodo started his career in early 2006, facing Tomohiko Yoshida at Powergate 6 on March 5, 2006. After three hard fought rounds, Kodo would win the fight via split decision. Kodo would fight against lower-tier opponents in Shooto, compiling a professional record of 6–1–2, before signing with Dream.

=== Dream ===
In his debut fight with Dream, Kodo faced current UFC fighter Joseph Benavidez at the Dream 5: Lightweight Grand Prix 2006 Finals on July 21, 2008. Benavidez, who was relatively unknown at the time, defeated Kodo via first round guillotine choke. Kodo subsequently re-signed with Shooto shortly after the fight.

=== Vale Tudo Japan ===
Following a long stint with Shooto, Kodo made his VTJ debut on June 28, 2014, facing Hidenobu Izena at VTJ 5th in Osaka. He won the fight via third round guillotine choke.

== Mixed martial arts record ==
Professional record breakdown
19 matches	10 wins	7 losses
By knockout	3	0
By submission	2	5
By decision	5	2
Draws	2	

Res.	Record	Opponent	Method	Event	Date	Round	Time	Location	Notes
Loss	10–7–2	Sota Kojima	Submission (rear-naked choke)	Tribe Tokyo Fight: TTF Challenge 03	November 3, 2014	2	3:33	Tokyo, Japan	
Win	10–6–2	Hidenobu Izena	Submission (guillotine choke)	Vale Tudo Japan: VTJ 5th in Osaka	June 28, 2014	3	1:25	Osaka, Japan	
Loss	9–6–2	Masaaki Sugawara	Submission (rear-naked choke)	Shooto Border: Season 4 - 3rd	December 9, 2012	3	3:43	Osaka, Japan	
Win	9–5–2	Shinichi Hanawa	Decision (unanimous)	Shooto: Gig Tokyo 10	June 30, 2012	3	5:00	Tokyo, Japan	
Loss	8–5–2	Fumihiro Kitahara	Submission (rear-naked choke)	Shooto: Gig North 7	October 16, 2011	2	3:57	Sapporo, Japan	
Loss	8–4–2	Kiyotaka Shimizu	Submission (rear-naked choke)	Shooto: Shootor's Legacy 2	April 1, 2011	2	3:16	Tokyo, Japan	
Win	8–3–2	Kentaro Watanabe	Decision (unanimous)	Shooto: Border: Season 2: Rhythm	August 15, 2010	3	5:00	Osaka, Japan	
Loss	7–3–2	Yuki Shojo	Decision (majority)	Shooto: Revolutionary Exchanges 2	September 22, 2009	3	5:00	Tokyo, Japan	
Win	7–2–2	Takahiro Hosoi	KO (punches)	Shooto: Shooto Tradition 5	January 18, 2009	2	0:36	Tokyo, Japan	
Loss	6–2–2	Joseph Benavidez	Submission (guillotine choke)	Dream 5: Lightweight Grand Prix 2008 Final Round	July 21, 2008	1	2:42	Osaka, Japan	
Loss	6–1–2	So Tazawa	Decision (unanimous)	Shooto: Shooting Disco 5: Earth, Wind and Fighter	June 21, 2008	3	5:00	Tokyo, Japan	
Win	6–0–2	Akira Kibe	KO (punches)	Shooto: Gig West 9	March 15, 2008	1	1:38	Osaka, Japan	
Draw	5–0–2	Yasuhiro Kanayama	Draw	Shooto: Gig West 8	September 29, 2007	2	5:00	Osaka, Japan	
Draw	5–0–1	Seiji Ozuka	Draw	Shooto: Battle Mix Tokyo 4	July 20, 2007	2	5:00	Tokyo, Japan	
Win	5–0	Atsushi Osano	TKO (doctor stoppage)	Shooto: Battle Mix Tokyo 3	May 26, 2007	2	3:21	Tokyo, Japan	
Win	4–0	Yasuaki Nagamoto	Decision (majority)	Shooto: Gig West 7	April 21, 2007	2	5:00	Osaka, Japan	
Win	3–0	Manabu Kano	Decision (unanimous)	Shooto: Gig West 6	November 4, 2006	2	5:00	Osaka, Japan	
Win	2–0	Yosuke Moriga	Submission (rear-naked choke)	Powergate 9: Kakuto Revival Festival	July 23, 2006	3	2:31	Kobe, Japan	
Win	1–0	Tomohiko Yoshida	Decision (split)	Powergate 6: Tour in Shushinkan Breweries Hall	March 5, 2006	3	3:00	Kobe, Japan	
