= Rambaa Somdet =

Thai martial artist

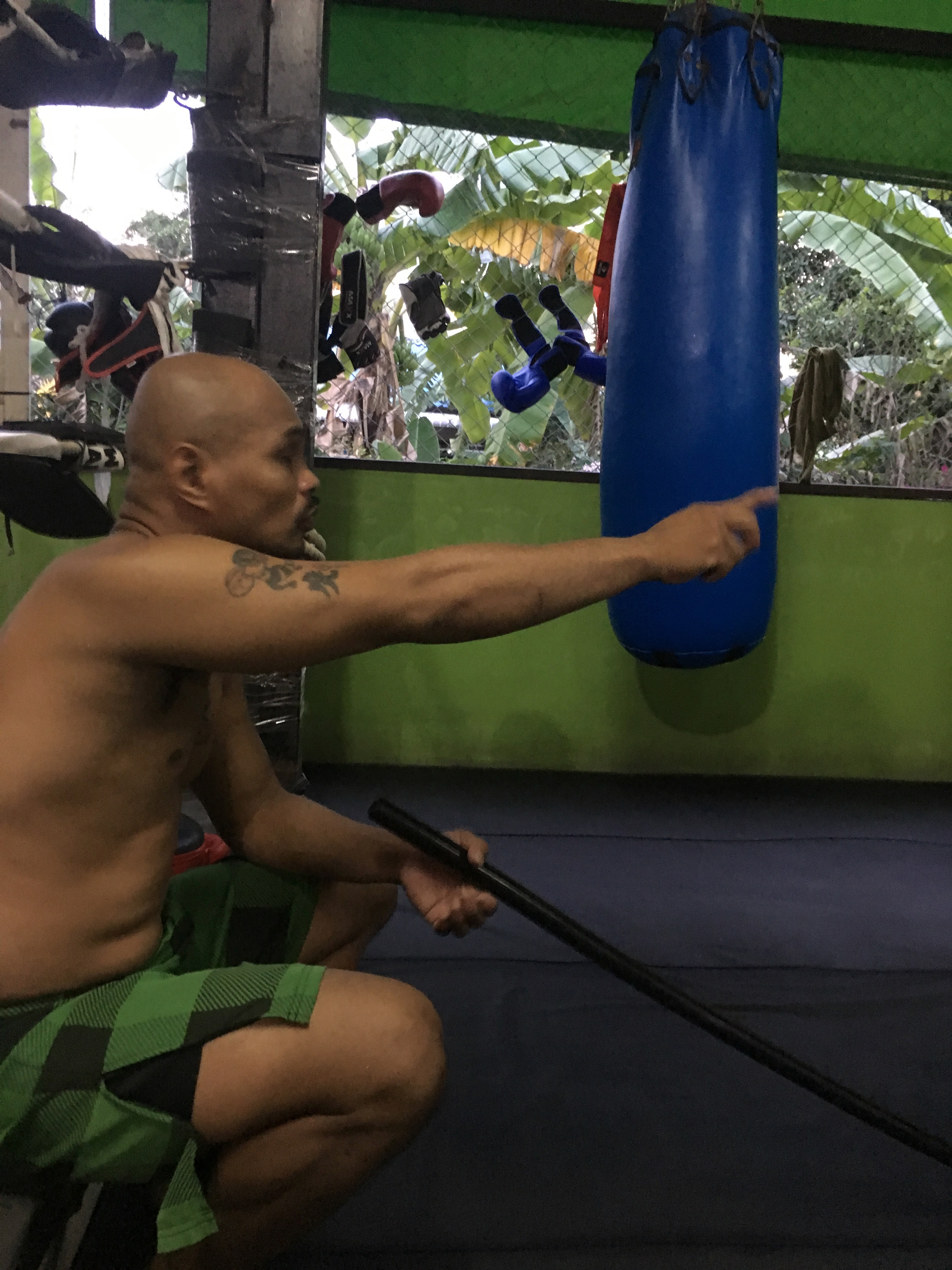
- Born: August 30, 1974 (age 52); Pattaya, Thailand
- Other names: Somdet Sit-Or (สมเดช ศิษย์ อ.); Rambaa M16 (แรมบ้า M16)
- Nationality: Thai
- Height: 5 ft 2 in (1.57 m)
- Weight: 115 lb (52 kg; 8.2 st)
- Division: Strawweight; Flyweight
- Style: Muay Thai
- Stance: Orthodox
- Fighting out of: Tokyo, Japan
- Team: M-16 Gym
- Years active: 1998–2015

Kickboxing record
- Total: 88
- Wins: 62
- Losses: 23
- Draws: 3

Mixed martial arts record
- Total: 16
- Wins: 13
- By knockout: 2
- By submission: 1
- By decision: 10
- Losses: 3
- By decision: 3

Other information
- Mixed martial arts record from Sherdog

Rambaa Somdet (Thai: แรมบ้า สมเดช; born August 30, 1974) is a retired Thai mixed martial artist and former Muay Thai fighter who has fought for K-1, Shooto, DEEP and Palace Fighting Championship. He competed in the flyweight and strawweight divisions. Somdet is a former Shooto World Flyweight (114 lb) Champion. He is considered by some to be the greatest strawweight in mixed martial arts history.

== Personal life ==
He has, since retiring, opened his own gym, the M-16 gym.

He is the nephew of the former Rajadamnern and WMC champion Tappaya Sit-Or and the cousin of the reigning Thailand and World Kickboxing Network Muaythai Welterweight world champion Sudsakorn Sor Klinmee. It was his uncle that first introduced him to Muay Thai.

== Mixed martial arts career ==
Rambaa Somdet made his mixed martial arts debut against Takumi Yano in 2001 during Deep 3 Impact. He won a unanimous decision. His second and third fights with DEEP were against Mitsuhisa Sunabe and Darren Uyenoyama, both of which he lost by way of unanimous decision. Somdet would however leave the organization on a win, defeating Takeyasu Hirono.

He would then move to Shooto, when he faced Takehiro Harusaki during Shooto: Battle Mix Tokyo 4. He won in his debut with Shooto. In his second fight he faced Masaaki Sugawara, which he won by TKO. He was then set to fight Noboru Tahara, winning his third fight in a row. Briefly leaving Shooto he was scheduled to fight for the PFC flyweight title, but was forced to withdraw with injury. After recovering he faced Ulysses Gomez during PFC 11: All In. He won a unanimous decision.

Riding a five fight winning streak, he was given a chance to fight for the inaugural Shooto Flyweight Champion. Somdet defeated Noboru Tahara in a rematch to become the first Shooto Flyweight Champion (Shooto's Flyweight division is fought at 114 lbs.) on November 23, 2009 in Tokyo. He defended his title against Hiroyuki Abe. He was scheduled to defend his title against Junji Ito at "Shootor's Legacy 2" on March 12, 2011, however the bout has been pushed back to April 29, 2011.

On April 16, 2011, Shooto announced Somdet was vacating his title due to a partially torn left biceps.

Moving to GRABAKA he won a decision versus Takuya Eizumi. Following this win, he was signed by PXC. Is his first with PXC he faced Rabin Catalan. He won the fight with a rear naked choke, the first submission win of his career. Returning to GRABAKA he won a unanimous decision against Kenichi Sawada. His 11 fight winning streak was snapped at PXC 46, losing a close split decision to Cristiano Pitpitunge.

His last mixed martial arts fight came at Shooto - Torao 15, when he won a unanimous decision against Masayoshi Kato.

== Championships and accomplishments ==
- Shooto
  - Shooto World Flyweight (114 lb) Championship
    - One successful title defense
  - Undefeated in Shooto (6-0)
- Fight Matrix
  - Strawweight lineal champion (One time, former)
    - Longest serving lineal champion (2007-2014)

== Mixed martial arts record ==
Professional record breakdown
16 matches	13 wins	3 losses
By knockout	2	0
By submission	1	0
By decision	10	3

Res.	Record	Opponent	Method	Event	Date	Round	Time	Location	Notes
Win	13–3	Masayoshi Kato	Decision (unanimous)	Shooto - Torao 15: Direction of the Cage	June 21, 2015	3	5:00	Tokyo, Japan	
Loss	12–3	Cristiano Pitpitunge	Decision (split)	PXC 46	November 15, 2014	3	5:00	Manila, Philippines	
Win	12–2	Kenichi Sawada	Decision (unanimous)	Grabaka Live! 3	October 27, 2013	3	5:00	Tokyo, Japan	
Win	11–2	Robin Catalan	Submission (rear-naked choke)	PXC 38	August 9, 2013	1	3:20	Mangilao, Guam	
Win	10–2	Takuya Eizumi	Decision (unanimous)	Grabaka Live 2	October 27, 2012	2	5:00	Tokyo, Japan	
Win	9–2	Ryota Uozumi	Decision (unanimous)	Grabaka Live - 1st Cage Attack	October 15, 2011	2	5:00	Tokyo, Japan	
Win	8–2	Hiroyuki Abe	TKO (doctor stoppage)	Shooto: The Way of Shooto 4: Like a Tiger, Like a Dragon	July 19, 2010	1	4:31	Tokyo, Japan	Defended the Shooto Flyweight Championship.
Win	7–2	Noboru Tahara	Decision (unanimous)	Shooto: Revolutionary Exchanges 3	November 23, 2009	3	5:00	Tokyo, Japan	Won the inaugural Shooto Flyweight Championship.
Win	6–2	Ulysses Gomez	Decision (unanimous)	PFC 11: All In	November 20, 2008	3	3:00	Lemoore, California, United States	
Win	5–2	Noboru Tahara	Decision (unanimous)	Shooto: Shooto Tradition 3	September 28, 2008	3	5:00	Tokyo, Japan	
Win	4–2	Masaaki Sugawara	TKO (doctor stoppage)	Shooto: Back To Our Roots 6	November 8, 2007	2	5:00	Tokyo, Japan	
Win	3–2	Takehiro Harusaki	Decision (unanimous)	Shooto: Battle Mix Tokyo 4	July 20, 2007	3	5:00	Tokyo, Japan	
Win	2–2	Takeyasu Hirono	Decision (unanimous)	Deep - 7th Impact	December 8, 2002	3	5:00	Tokyo, Japan	
Loss	1–2	Darren Uyenoyama	Decision (unanimous)	Deep - 5th Impact	June 9, 2002	3	5:00	Tokyo, Japan	
Loss	1–1	Mitsuhisa Sunabe	Decision (majority)	Deep - 4th Impact	March 30, 2002	3	5:00	Nagoya, Japan	
Win	1–0	Takumi Yano	Decision (unanimous)	Deep - 3rd Impact	December 23, 2001	3	5:00	Tokyo, Japan	

== Muay Thai record ==
Muay Thai Record (Incomplete)
62 Wins, 23 Losses, 3 Draws
Date	Result	Opponent	Event	Location	Method	Round	Time
2001-11-11	Win	(Thailand) Khunchailek Chaoraiaoi	Omnoi Stadium	Samut Sakhon, Thailand	Decision	5	3:00
2001-03-16	Win	(Japan) Ken Yasukawa	AJKF "CROSS FIRE-I"	Bunkyo, Tokyo, Japan	KO	1	2:12
2001-02-16	Win	(France) Philipe de Silva	AJKF "Be Wild"	Bunkyo, Tokyo, Japan	KO (head kick)	1	2:00
2000-11-01	Win	(Japan) Susumu Daiguji	K-1 J-MAX 2000	Bunkyo, Tokyo, Japan	Decision (unanimous)	5	3:00
2000-07-08	Loss	(Thailand) Sueahuallek Chor Sophipong	Omnoi Stadium	Samut Sakhon, Thailand	Decision	5	3:00
1999-08-07	Win	(Thailand) Lookdod Sor.Thammarangsri	Omnoi Stadium	Samut Sakhon, Thailand	KO (High kick)	1	
1999-05-14	Win	(Japan) Genki Yamaguchi	MAJKF "The 2nd Kajiwara Ikki Cup'99 Kick Guts"	Bunkyo, Tokyo, Japan	Decision (unanimous)	3	3:00
1998-12-26	Win	(Japan) Rabbit Seki	MAJKF	Bunkyo, Tokyo, Japan	KO (knees)	1	2:46
1998-11-14	Win	(Japan) Joe Tsuchiya	"Ground Zero Tokyo"		KO (right hook)	1	2:59
1998-06-27	Loss	(Thailand) Nichao Ptechsamai	Omnoi Stadium	Samut Sakhon, Thailand	Decision	5	3:00
1998-	Win	(Thailand) Houysailek Sor.Suwanpakdee	Lumpinee Stadium	Bangkok, Thailand	Decision	5	3:00
1997-07-05	Loss	(Thailand) Chondan Technodusit	Omnoi Stadium	Samut Sakhon, Thailand	Decision	5	3:00
1997-02-01	Loss	(France) Kamel Jemel	Le Choc Des Champions	Gagny, France	Decision	5	3:00
1995-	Win	(France) Omar Moussadak		Thailand	TKO (retirement)	3	
?	Loss	(Thailand) Toto Por.Pongsawang	Omnoi Stadium	Thailand	KO (Left Elbow)	2	
1995-02-16	Win	(Thailand) Chakphet Kiatchaiyong	Omnoi Stadium	Samut Sakhon, Thailand	KO	2	
1994-12-13	Loss	(Thailand) Chiangrung Kor Narongsak		Samut Songkhram, Thailand	Decision	5	3:00
1994-11-26	Win	(Thailand) Chiangrung Kor.Narongsak	Omnoi Stadium	Samut Sakhon, Thailand	Decision	5	3:00
1994-10-	Win	(Thailand) Yomio Hyundai		Chiang Rai, Thailand	Decision	5	3:00
1994-10-	Win	(Japan) Kobayashi (YamagiGym)		Nongkhai, Thailand	KO (High kick)	3	
1994-09-30	Win	(Thailand) Samandej Lookmongkwan	Lumpinee Stadium	Bangkok, Thailand	KO (Uppercuts)	2	
1994-09-06	Win	(Thailand) Mondam Sor Nayai-Nam	Omnoi Stadium	Samut Sakhon, Thailand	KO (Uppercut)	1	0:29
1994-08-20	Win	(Thailand) Sakbanlue Sakcharuporn	Omnoi Stadium	Samut Sakhon, Thailand	Decision	5	3:00
1994-08-05	Win	(Thailand) Chakphet Kiatchaiyong	Lumpinee Stadium	Bangkok, Thailand	KO (Punches)	2	
1994-07-18	Draw	(Thailand) Sakbanlue Sakcharuporn	Lumpinee Stadium	Bangkok, Thailand	Decision	5	3:00
1994-06-	Win	(Thailand) Samandej Lookmongkwan	Lumpinee Stadium	Bangkok, Thailand	KO	2	
1994-05-	Win	(Thailand) Pichitchai Kiatpraphat	Omnoi Stadium	Samut Sakhon, Thailand	KO	2	
1994-04-13	Win	(Netherlands) Jimmy		Chiang Mai province, Thailand	Decision	5	3:00
1994-03-26	Loss	(Thailand) Jompadet Singkiri	Omnoi Stadium	Samut Sakhon, Thailand	Decision	5	3:00
1994-	Win	(Thailand) Seua Or.Ukrit	Lumpinee Stadium	Bangkok, Thailand	Decision	5	3:00
1993-12-09	Loss	(Thailand) Kompayak Sit Kru Od		Chonburi, Thailand	Decision	5	3:00
1993-11-21	Win	(Laos) Thao Khammanoon		Vientiane, Laos	TKO	2	
1993-10-09	Loss	(Thailand) Jaruad Manwood	Omnoi Stadium	Samut Sakhon, Thailand	Decision	5	3:00
1993-04-02	Win	(Thailand) Malaithong Sakthewan	Lumpinee Stadium	Bangkok, Thailand	Decision	5	3:00
1993-03-05	Loss	(Thailand) Malaithong Sakthewan	Omnoi Stadium	Samut Sakhon, Thailand	Decision	5	3:00
1993-	Win	(Thailand) Aodnoi Galaxy	Omnoi Stadium	Samut Sakhon, Thailand	KO (Left Hook)	5	
1992-12-08	Loss	(Thailand) Mondam Sor.Nayayarm	Lumpinee Stadium	Thailand	KO (Punches)	2	
1992-11-17	Win	(Thailand) Jomtabnoi Sitkruod	Lumpinee Stadium	Bangkok, Thailand	Decision	5	3:00
1992-07-28	Loss	(Thailand) Jomruthbek Rattanachot	Lumpinee Stadium	Bangkok, Thailand	Decision	5	3:00
1992-07-10	Win	(Thailand) Sornsuriya Sor Badin	Lumpinee Stadium	Bangkok, Thailand	Decision	5	3:00
1992-05-26	Win	(Thailand) Denthaksin Sor.Suwanpakdee	Lumpinee Stadium	Bangkok, Thailand	TKO (Punches)		
1992-04-10	Win	(Thailand) Chalong Silpakorn	Lumpinee Stadium	Bangkok, Thailand	KO (High kick)	3	
1991-11-08	Win	(Thailand) Yodkaen Ploysakda	Lumpinee Stadium	Bangkok, Thailand	KO	1	
1991-09-06	Loss	(Thailand) Jomruthbek Rattanachot	Lumpinee Stadium	Bangkok, Thailand	Decision	5	3:00
1991-07-	Loss	(Thailand) Nungthoranee Pëtchyindee	Lumpinee Stadium	Bangkok, Thailand	Decision	5	3:00
1991-07-09	Win	(Thailand) Wanlop Sitpayak	Lumpinee Stadium	Bangkok, Thailand	KO (Punches)	2	
1991-02-16	Win	(Thailand) Chiangrung Kor.Narongsak		Pattaya, Thailand	Decision	5	3:00
1991-01-28	Loss	(Thailand) Chuchai Kiatchaning	Rajadamnern Stadium	Bangkok, Thailand	KO (Uppercut)	1	
1990-12-31		(Thailand) Chuchai Kiatchaning	Lumpinee Stadium	Bangkok, Thailand			
1990-11-23	Loss	(Thailand) Chuchai Kiatchaning	Lumpinee Stadium	Bangkok, Thailand	Decision	5	3:00
1990-11-06	Win	(Thailand) Denthaksin Sor.Suwanpakdee	Lumpinee Stadium	Bangkok, Thailand	Decision	5	3:00
1990-08-28	Loss	(Thailand) Saenklai Sit Kru Od	Lumpinee Stadium	Bangkok, Thailand	Decision	5	3:00
1990-08-07	Win	(Thailand) Rotnarong Daopadriew	Onesongchai, Lumpinee Stadium	Bangkok, Thailand	Decision	5	3:00
1990-05-11	Win	(Thailand) Bebi Chor Jinsakul	Lumpinee Stadium	Bangkok, Thailand	Decision	5	3:00
1989-07-22	Win	(Thailand) Hongthong Phetsriracha		Chonburi, Thailand	Decision	5	3:00
1989-01-03	Loss	(Thailand) Hongthong Phetsriracha	Lumpinee Stadium	Bangkok, Thailand	Decision	5	3:00
Legend: Win Loss Draw/No contest Notes

== Submission grappling record ==
Professional record breakdown
1 match	0 wins	1 loss
By submission	0	0
By decision	0	1
By disqualification	0	0
Draws	0	

Result	Rec.	Opponent	Method	Event	Division	Type	Year	Location
Loss	0–1	(Japan) Tomohiro Hashi	Points (0–9)	"Shooto Gig East 11"	Superfight	Nogi	Sep 25, 2002	Tokyo, Japan
