= Yoshitaka Naito =

Martial artist from Japan

- Born: Yoshitaka Naito; February 17, 1984 (age 42); Inzai, Chiba Prefecture, Japan
- Native name: 内藤禎貴
- Other names: "Nobita"
- Nationality: Japanese
- Height: 170 cm (5 ft 7 in)
- Weight: 57 kg (126 lb; 9 st)
- Division: Strawweight
- Stance: Orthodox
- Fighting out of: Matsudo, Japan
- Team: The Paraestra Matsudo
- Years active: 2012–2020

Mixed martial arts record
- Total: 19
- Wins: 15
- By knockout: 1
- By submission: 6
- By decision: 8
- Losses: 4
- By knockout: 1
- By decision: 3

Amateur record
- Total: 7
- Wins: 6
- By decision: 5
- Losses: 1
- By decision: 1

Other information
- Mixed martial arts record from Sherdog

Yoshitaka Naito (内藤禎貴, Naito Yoshitaka) (born February 17, 1984) is a retired Japanese mixed martial artist from Inzai, Chiba Prefecture, Japan. He is a former two-time ONE Strawweight World Champion. Naito is furthermore a former Shooto World Flyweight (114 lb) Champion, where he holds the record for flyweight title defenses, and was voted Fighter of the Year for two consecutive years.

He is regarded as one of the best strawweights in the world, and is ranked as the #2 all time strawweight by Fight Matrix.

== Early life ==
In his childhood, Naito was a quiet kid who loved manga. One of his favorite titles was Doraemon, and during his martial arts career, he earned the nickname “Nobita” because of his resemblance to the lead character in the Doraemon manga.

Naito didn't practice any martial arts as a child, but was a member of the soccer club in junior high school. He had few friends during his adolescence and struggled with his grades in school. He later dropped out of high school, a short-sighted decision he later said he regretted.

Naito fell in love with mixed martial arts in the early 2000s. He loved watching Kazushi Sakuraba, who he calls his martial arts hero. He was fascinated by the submissions Sakuraba was able to pull off against foreign athletes in Pride Fighting Championships and soon found himself training at Paraestra Matsudo. He was invited to train at Paraestra Matsudo by his brother Nobutaka. His brother is also a mixed martial artist, currently competing with Shooto.

== Martial Arts Career ==
=== Shooto ===
Naito began training mixed martial arts at the age of 22. Despite a rough start to his training and amateur competitions, he won the 2011 All Japan Amateur Shooto Tournament.

Naito made his professional debut with the Shooto organization on August 25, 2012, at the age of 27. He defeated Tsubasa Fujikawa via guillotine choke in round two in the semifinals of the Rookie Flyweight Tournament at Shooto - Gig Tokyo 11 on 25 August 2012. In the tournament finals, held at Shooto - The Rookie Tournament Final 2012 on 15 December 2012, he beat Shota Kondo by stoppage in the second round to become the 2012 Shooto Rookie Flyweight tournament champion. He won his next five fights to earn a title shot against reigning Shooto Flyweight Champion Shinya Murofushi.

In the main event of Shooto 7th Round 2014 on 27 September 2014, Naito submitted Shinya Murofushi with three seconds remaining in the fight to win the Shooto World Flyweight (114lbs) Championship.

Naito made his first Shooto World Flyweight (114lbs) championship defense against Ryuto Sawada at Shooto - Professional Shooto 7/26 on 26 July 2015. He won by arm-triangle choke in the fourth round.

Naito made his second Shooto World Flyweight (114lbs) championship defense against Junji Ito at Shooto - Professional Shooto 11/29 on November 29, 2015. He won by decision.

=== One Championship ===
Naito vacated the Shooto World Flyweight championship on April 22, 2016, after signing with ONE Championship.

Naito challenged the undefeated ONE Strawweight World champion Dejdamrong Sor Amnuaysirichoke at ONE Championship: Kingdom of Champions on 27 May 2016. He defeated the former Lumpinee Stadium mini-flyweight and light-flyweight champion by rear-naked choke in the fourth round to become the ONE Strawweight World Champion.

Naito made his first championship defense against the undefeated Joshua Pacio at ONE Championship: State of Warriors on 7 October 2016. He submitted Pacio by rear-naked choke in the third round to retain the belt.

Naito made his second championship defense against the once-defeated Brazilian Jiu-Jitsu World Champion Alex Silva at ONE Championship: Warriors of the World on 9 December 2017. After five rounds, Silva defeated Naito by unanimous decision to hand him his first professional loss and take the belt.

An immediate rematch between the pair was scheduled at ONE Championship: Grit and Glory on 12 May 2018. This time, Naito was able to defeat Alex Silva by split decision to reclaim the title.

Naito made the first defense of his second ONE Strawweight World Title reign against Joshua Pacio in a rematch from nearly two years earlier on 22 September 2018. He lost the fight by unanimous decision.

Naito faced Rene Catalan at ONE Championship: Reign of Valor on 8 March 2019. He lost the fight via technical knockout in the first round.

Naito faced Alex Silva for a third time at ONE Championship: Enter the Dragon on 17 May 2019. He won by unanimous decision to complete their trilogy.

Naito faced Pongsiri Mitsatit at ONE Championship: Masters Of Fate on 8 November 2019 and defeated him by unanimous decision.

Naito faced Yosuke Saruta at Road to One 3: Tokyo Fight Night on 10 September 2020. He lost the fight via unanimous decision.

== Championships and Accomplishments ==
- Shooto
  - 2011 All Japan Amateur Shooto Tournament Championship
  - 2012 Shooto Rookie Flyweight Tournament Championship
  - Shooto World Flyweight (114 lb) Championship (One time)
    - Two successful title defenses
  - Most consecutive Shooto World Flyweight (114 lb) Championship defenses (2)
  - 2014 and 2015 Shooto Fighter of the Year
  - 2015 Fight of the Year (vs. Ryuto Sawada)
  - Undefeated in Shooto (10—0)
- ONE Championship
  - ONE Strawweight World Championship (Two times)
    - One successful title defense
- Fight Matrix
  - Strawweight Lineal Champion (One time, former)
- eFight.jp
  - September 2014, May 2016 and May 2018 Fighter of the Month

== Mixed martial arts record ==
Professional record breakdown
19 matches	15 wins	4 losses
By knockout	1	1
By submission	6	0
By decision	8	3

Res.	Record	Opponent	Method	Event	Date	Round	Time	Location	Notes
Loss	15–4	Yosuke Saruta	Decision (unanimous)	Road to One 3: Tokyo Fight Night	September 10, 2020	3	5:00	Tokyo, Japan	
Win	15–3	Pongsiri Mitsatit	Decision (unanimous)	ONE Championship: Masters Of Fate	8 November 2019	3	5:00	Manila, Philippines	
Win	14–3	Alex Silva	Decision (unanimous)	ONE Championship: Enter the Dragon	17 May 2019	3	5:00	Kallang, Singapore	
Loss	13–3	Rene Catalan	TKO (punches)	ONE Championship: Reign of Valor	8 March 2019	1	4:32	Yangon, Myanmar	
Loss	13–2	Joshua Pacio	Decision (unanimous)	ONE Championship: Conquest of Heroes	22 September 2018	5	5:00	Jakarta, Indonesia	Lost the ONE Strawweight World Championship
Win	13–1	Alex Silva	Decision (split)	ONE Championship: Grit and Glory	12 May 2018	5	5:00	Jakarta, Indonesia	Won the ONE Strawweight World Championship
Loss	12–1	Alex Silva	Decision (unanimous)	ONE Championship: Warriors of the World	9 December 2017	5	5:00	Bangkok, Thailand	Lost the ONE Strawweight World Championship
Win	12–0	Joshua Pacio	Submission (Rear-Naked Choke)	ONE Championship: State of Warriors	7 October 2016	3	1:33	Yangon, Myanmar	Defended the ONE Strawweight World Championship
Win	11–0	Dejdamrong Sor Amnuaysirichoke	Submission (Rear-Naked Choke)	ONE Championship: Kingdom of Champions	27 May 2016	4	4:00	Bangkok, Thailand	Won the ONE Strawweight World Championship
Win	10–0	Junji Ito	Decision (Unanimous)	Shooto - Professional Shooto 11/29	29 November 2015	5	5:00	Tokyo, Japan	Defended Shooto World Flyweight (114lbs) Championship
Win	9–0	Ryuto Sawada	Submission (Arm-Triangle Choke)	Shooto - Professional Shooto 7/26	26 July 2015	4	4:46	Tokyo, Japan	Defended Shooto World Flyweight (114lbs) Championship
Win	8–0	Shinya Murofushi	Submission (Rear-Naked Choke)	Shooto - 7th Round 2014	27 September 2014	5	4:57	Tokyo, Japan	Won Shooto World Flyweight (114lbs) Championship
Win	7–0	Yuki Shojo	Decision (Unanimous)	Shooto - 2nd Round 2014	16 March 2014	3	5:00	Tokyo, Japan	
Win	6–0	Tadaaki Yamamoto	Decision (Unanimous)	Shooto - 5th Round 2013	9 November 2013	3	5:00	Tokyo, Japan	
Win	5–0	Takeshi Sato	Decision (Unanimous)	Shooto - Shooting Disco 22	5 October 2013	3	5:00	Tokyo, Japan	
Win	4–0	Atsushi Takeuchi	Decision (Majority)	Shooto - Shooting Disco 21: Catch the Moment	8 June 2013	3	5:00	Tokyo, Japan	
Win	3–0	Takafumi Ato	Submission (Armbar)	Shooto - Shooting Disco 20	23 February 2013	3	3:10	Tokyo, Japan	
Win	2–0	Shota Kondo	KO (Punches)	Shooto - The Rookie Tournament Final 2012	15 December 2012	2	3:16	Tokyo, Japan	Won the Shooto Rookie Flyweight Tournament
Win	1–0	Tsubasa Fujikawa	Submission (Guillotine Choke)	Shooto - Gig Tokyo 11	25 August 2012	2	1:34	Tokyo, Japan	Shooto Rookie Flyweight Tournament Semifinals

== Amateur mixed martial arts record ==
Amateur record breakdown		
7 matches	6 wins	1 loss
By decision	5	1
By disqualification	1	0

Res.	Record	Opponent	Method	Event	Date	Round	Time	Location	Notes
Win	6–1	Tetsuya Yoshitake	Decision (Unanimous)	2012 Shooto Rookie Flyweight Tournament	18 September 2011	2	3:00	Odawara, Japan	Won the Shooto Amateur Flyweight Tournament
Win	5–1	Atsushi Makita	Decision (Unanimous)	2012 Shooto Rookie Flyweight Tournament	18 September 2011	2	2:00	Odawara, Japan	Shooto Amateur Flyweight Tournament Semifinals
Win	4–1	Yusuke Kamata	Decision (Unanimous)	2012 Shooto Rookie Flyweight Tournament	18 September 2011	2	2:00	Odawara, Japan	Shooto Amateur Flyweight Tournament Quarterfinals
Win	3–1	Hiroaki Shishino	Decision (Unanimous)	2012 Shooto Rookie Flyweight Tournament	18 September 2011	1	4:00	Odawara, Japan	Shooto Amateur Flyweight Tournament Round 1
Loss	2–1	Komazawa Takayuki	Decision (Unanimous)	2010 East Japan Amateur Shooto Tournament	23 December 2010	1	4:00	Tokorozawa, Saitama, Japan	East Japan Amateur Shooto Tournament Round 1
Win	2–0	Takuya Okada	DQ (Foul)	DuroFF	9 March 2008	2	0:13	Yokkaichi, Japan	
Win	1–0	Hidemi Nahata	Decision (Unanimous)	Omiya FF 57	21 October 2007	2	2:00	Ōmiya, Saitama, Japan	

== See also ==
- List of male mixed martial artists
