= Murofushi =

Murofushi (written: 室伏) is a Japanese surname. Notable people with the surname include:

- Koji Murofushi (室伏 アレクサンダー 広治, born 1974), Japanese hammer thrower
- Shigenobu Murofushi (室伏 重信, born 1945), Japanese hammer thrower
- Shinya Murofushi, Japanese mixed martial artist
- Wataru Murofushi (室伏 航, born 1995), Japanese footballer
- Yuka Murofushi (室伏 由佳, born 1977), Japanese discus and hammer thrower
