= Keito Yamakita =

Japanese mixed martial arts (MMA) fighter

- Born: 4 August 1996 (age 30); Inabe, Mie Prefecture, Japan
- Native name: 山北渓人
- Nationality: Japanese
- Height: 5 ft 1 in (1.55 m)
- Weight: 124 lb (56 kg; 8 st 12 lb)
- Division: Strawweight
- Stance: Orthodox
- Fighting out of: Shibuya, Tokyo, Japan
- Team: Reversal Gym Shinjuku Me, We
- Rank: Blue belt in Brazilian Jiu Jitsu
- Years active: 2020–present

Mixed martial arts record
- Total: 15
- Wins: 13
- By knockout: 1
- By submission: 5
- By decision: 7
- Losses: 2
- By submission: 1
- By decision: 1

Other information
- Occupation: Instructor at the Toikatu Dojo MMA
- University: Senshu University
- Mixed martial arts record from Sherdog

Keito Yamakita (山北渓人; born August 4, 1996) is a Japanese mixed martial artist. He currently competes in the strawweight division of Pancrase and ONE Championship, where he is the former Pancrase Strawweight champion.

== Early life and background ==
Yamakita became interested in mixed martial arts while watching Pride Fighting Championships as a child and began wrestling in the fourth grade of elementary school. He continued wrestling while attending the Inabe Sogo Gakuen High School and Senshu University. Yamakita made his mixed martial arts debut while working at a restaurant, but soon quit his job in the food industry to take up a position as a coach at the Toikatu Dojo.

== Mixed martial arts career ==
=== Pancrase ===
==== Neo Blood Tournament ====
On December 12, 2020, it was announced that Yamakita would be one of eight participants in the 2020 Pancrase Neo Blood strawweight tournament. Yamakita faced the 0–2 Masaya Oshiro in the tournament quarterfinals, which were held at Pancrase 312 on February 16, 2020. He won the fight by a first-round technical submission by kimura.

Yamakita faced the debuting Tomoki Otsuka at Pancrase 319 on October 25, 2020, in the penultimate bout of the tournament. He won the fight by unanimous decision. Yamakita advanced to the tournament final, held at Pancrase 320 on December 13, 2020, where he faced the undefeated Taiga Tanimura. He won the fight by unanimous decision, with scores of 30–27, 29–28 and 29–28.

==== Title run ====
Yamakita faced Shuto Aki at Road to ONE: Young Guns on February 22, 2021. He won the fight by a second-round knockout. Yamakita took Aki down early on in the second round and finished him with grounded knees at the 2:21 minute mark.

Yamakita faced the sixth ranked Pancrase strawweight contender Tatsuki Ozaki at Pancrase 322 on June 27, 2021. He won the fight by a first-round submission, forcing Ozaki to tap with an armbar near the very end of the round.

Yamakita faced the once-defeated Ryosuke Noda at Pancrase 324 on October 16, 2021. He won the fight by unanimous decision. Two of the judges scored the fight 30–27 in his favor, while the third judge awarded him a 30–26 scorecard. Following this victory, Yamakita was ranked as the third best strawweight in the world by Fight Matrix.

==== Strawweight champion ====
His six-fight undefeated streak in Pancrase earned Yamakita a title opportunity, as he was booked to challenge the reigning Strawweight King of Pancrase Daichi Kitakata in the main event of the first part of Pancrase 328 on July 18, 2022. He captured the title by unanimous decision, with all three judges scoring the bout 48–47 in his favor.

=== ONE Championship ===
On February 10, 2023, Yamakita announced that he signed with ONE Championship.

Yamakita faced Alex Silva on March 25, 2023, at ONE Fight Night 8. He won the fight via unanimous decision.

Yamakita faced Bokang Masunyane on January 28, 2024, at ONE 165. He lost the fight via unanimous decision.

Yamakita faced Jeremy Miado on March 1, 2024, at ONE 166. He won the fight by first-round submission via bulldog choke.

Yamakita faced Yosuke Saruta on August 3, 2024, at ONE Fight Night 24. He won the fight via split decision.

Yamakita faced Lito Adiwang on February 8, 2025, at ONE Fight Night 28. He won the fight via unanimous decision.

== Championships and accomplishments ==
=== Mixed martial arts ===
- Pancrase
  - Amateur All Japan Pancrase Flyweight Championship
  - Pancrase Neo Blood Strawweight Tournament Winner
  - Pancrase Strawweight Championship

=== Grappling ===
Freestyle Wrestling

- 2011 National Junior High School Championship (−47 kg) Third Place
- 2011 National Junior High School Selection Championship (−47 kg) Third Place
- 2014 National High School Selection Championship (−55 kg) Third Place
- 2014 National Athletic Meet (−50 kg) Runner-up
- 2016 East Japan Student Autumn Newcomer Championship (−57 kg) Third Place
- 2017 East Japan Student Spring Championship (−57 kg) Runner-up
- 2017 National Athletic Meet (−57 kg) Runner-up
- 2018 East Japan Student Spring Championship (−57 kg) Third Place
- 2018 East Japan Student Autumn Championship (−57 kg) Runner-up

Jiu-Jitsu

- 2019 All Japan Nogi Jiu-Jitsu Light Featherweight Advanced Champion
- 2022 All Japan Nogi Jiu-Jitsu Light Featherweight Expert Championship Third Place
- 2022 All Japan Brazilian Jiu-Jitsu Championship Blue Belt Light Featherweight Championship

== Mixed martial arts record ==
Professional record breakdown
15 matches	13 wins	2 losses
By knockout	1	0
By submission	5	1
By decision	7	1

Res.	Record	Opponent	Method	Event	Date	Round	Time	Location	Notes
Loss	13–2	Joshua Pacio	Technical Submission (arm-triangle choke)	ONE Samurai 5	November 18, 2026	4	4:17	Tokyo, Japan	For the ONE Strawweight Championship (125 lb).
Win	13–1	Koyuru Tanoue	Submission (bulldog choke)	ONE Samurai 2	August 8, 2026	1	4:37	Tokyo, Japan	
Win	12–1	Ryohei Kurosawa	Submission (armbar)	ONE Samurai 1	April 29, 2026	2	1:31	Tokyo, Japan	
Win	11–1	Lito Adiwang	Decision (unanimous)	ONE Fight Night 28	February 8, 2025	3	5:00	Bangkok, Thailand	
Win	10–1	Yosuke Saruta	Decision (split)	ONE Fight Night 24	August 3, 2024	3	5:00	Bangkok, Thailand	
Win	9–1	Jeremy Miado	Submission (bulldog choke)	ONE 166	March 1, 2024	1	4:04	Lusail, Qatar	
Loss	8–1	Bokang Masunyane	Decision (unanimous)	ONE 165	January 28, 2024	3	5:00	Tokyo, Japan	
Win	8–0	Alex Silva	Decision (unanimous)	ONE Fight Night 8	March 25, 2023	3	5:00	Kallang, Singapore	Return to Flyweight.
Win	7–0	Daichi Kitakata	Decision (unanimous)	Pancrase 328	July 18, 2022	5	5:00	Tokyo, Japan	Won the Pancrase Strawweight Championship.
Win	6–0	Ryosuke Noda	Decision (unanimous)	Pancrase 324	October 16, 2021	3	5:00	Tokyo, Japan	
Win	5–0	Tatsuki Ozaki	Submission (armbar)	Pancrase 322	June 27, 2021	1	4:54	Tokyo, Japan	Return to Strawweight.
Win	4–0	Shuto Aki	KO (knee)	Road to ONE: Young Guns	February 22, 2021	2	2:21	Tokyo, Japan	Flyweight debut.
Win	3–0	Taiga Tanimura	Decision (unanimous)	Pancrase 320	December 13, 2020	3	5:00	Tokyo, Japan	Won the Pancrase 26th Neo Blood Strawweight Tournament.
Win	2–0	Tomoki Otsuka	Decision (unanimous)	Pancrase 319	October 25, 2020	3	5:00	Tokyo, Japan	Pancrase 26th Neo Blood Strawweight Tournament Semifinal.
Win	1–0	Masaya Oshiro	Technical Submission (kimura)	Pancrase 312	February 16, 2020	1	4:51	Tokyo, Japan	Strawweight debut. Pancrase 26th Neo Blood Strawweight Tournament Quarterfinal.

== See also ==
- List of current ONE fighters
- List of Pancrase champions
