= Noboru Tahara =

Japanese martial artist

- Born: 田原 伸平; September 4, 1983 (age 43); Kitaazumi District, Nagano, Japan
- Other names: Tahara Simpe, Shinpei
- Nationality: Japanese
- Height: 5 ft 2 in (1.57 m)
- Weight: 120.0 lb (54.4 kg)
- Division: Flyweight
- Fighting out of: Saitama, Japan
- Team: K-Place
- Years active: 2006 - 2013

Mixed martial arts record
- Total: 20
- Wins: 12
- By knockout: 5
- By submission: 1
- By decision: 6
- Losses: 7
- By knockout: 1
- By decision: 6
- Draws: 1

Other information
- Mixed martial arts record from Sherdog

Noboru Tahara (Japanese: 田原 伸平, Tahara Noboru; born September 4, 1983) is a retired Japanese mixed martial artist, who competed in the strawweight divisions of Pancrase and Shooto. He is a one-time Pancrase light flyweight and one-time Shooto flyweight title challenger. He is recognized as the tenth best strawweight in the history of mixed martial arts by Fight Matrix.

== Mixed martial arts career ==
=== Amateur career ===
Tahara competed in the Copa Palestra East Japan Shooto Grappling Open Tournament, held on September 28, 2003, and competed in the flyweight division. He finished as the second best of five participants, losing to Koji Murofushi in the finals.

On July 14, 2004, Tahara took part in the 4th East Japan Amateur Shooto Tournament, competing in the flyweight (114 lbs) division. He finished as the third best of eleven competitors. This allowed him to compete in the 11th All Japan Amateur Shooto Championship, which was held on September 20, 2004. He finished as the third best.

Tahara participated in the 5th East Japan Amateur Shooto Championship as well, which was held on August 14, 2005, and once again finished as third best. His third place allowed him to compete in the 12th iteration of the All Japan Amateur Shooto Championship, where he finished as the third best, same as the previous year, losing to Shinya Murofushi in the semi-finals. Following this loss, Tahara decided to become a professional mixed martial artist.

=== Shooto ===
==== Early professional career ====
Tahara made his professional debut against Takeshi Yamada, under the ring name of Tahara Simpe, at Shooto: 3/3 in Kitazawa Town Hall on March 3, 2006. He lost the fight by unanimous decision.

On February 18, 2007, Tahara participated in the 4th East Japan Shooto Grappling Open bantamweight tournament. He finished as the runner-up, losing to Hiroyuki Abe by points in the final.

Tahara was scheduled to face Kenichi Sawada, in his second professional appearance, at Shooto: 11/30 in Kitazawa Town Hall on November 30, 2006. He won the fight by a second-round technical knockout. This victory earned him the place in the Shooto Rookie of the Year flyweight tournament. Before this tournament, he changed his ring name from Tahara Simpe to his birth name Noboru Tahara. Tahara was scheduled to face Hiroyuki Abe in the opening round of the tournament at Shooto 2007: 6/30 in Kitazawa Town Hall on June 30, 2007. He won the fight by a second-round technical knockout. Abe's camp later filed a complaint claiming the cut Abe's eye, which cause the fight to be stopped, was caused by a headbutt. Shooto agreed and changed the fight result from a technical knockout victory to a technical decision loss for Tahara.

==== First winning streak ====
Tahara was scheduled to face Junji Ito at Shooto: Shooting Disco 3: Everybody Fight Now on October 20, 2007. He earned his second professional victory by unanimous decision.

Tahara was scheduled to face Takehiro Ishii at Shooto: Shooting Disco 4: Born in the Fighting on February 23, 2008. He won the fight by unanimous decision.

Tahara was scheduled to face Katsuya Murofushi at Shooto: Shooto Tradition 1 on May 3, 2008. He won the fight by a second-round technical knockout, due to a cut.

Tahara was scheduled to face Atsushi Takeuchi at Shooto: Shooting Disco 5: Earth, Wind and Fighter on June 21, 2008. He won the fight by a second-round submission, forcing Takeuchi to tap to an armbar at the 3:26 minute mark.

Following this four-fight winning streak, Tahara was scheduled to face the streaking Rambaa Somdet at Shooto: Shooto Tradition 3 on September 28, 2008. Tahara was unable to land takedowns, excepting the solitary successful takedown in the second round, and lost the fight by unanimous decision. As Somdet as deducted a point in the first round, he won the fight by scores of 29-27, 29-26 and 29-27.

==== Flyweight title run ====
Tahara was scheduled to face Takehiro Harusaki at Shooto: Kitazawa Shooto 2009 Vol. 1 on March 20, 2009. The fight was ruled a split draw, with scores of 30-29, 28-30 and 29-29.

Tahara was scheduled to face Shinya Murofushi at Shooto: Shooting Disco 9: Superman on June 6, 2009. He won the fight by a third-round technical knockout, finishing Murofushi through ground-and-pound.

Tahara was scheduled to face Jesse Taitano in the main event of Shooto: Gig Saitama 1 on August 9, 2009, in a 119 lbs catchweight bout. He won the fight by unanimous decision.

Tahara was rewarded for his three-fight undefeated streak with a rematch with Rambaa Somdet for the vacant Shooto Flyweight Championship at Shooto: Revolutionary Exchanges 3 on November 23, 2009. He lost the fight by unanimous decision, with scores of 30-27, 30-26 and 30-26.

Tahara rebounded from this loss with a second-round technical knockout of Junji Ikoma at Shooto: Border: Season 2: Vibration on March 28, 2010.

=== Pancrase ===
==== Early Pancrase career ====
Tahara made his Pancrase debut against Toshimichi Akagi at Pancrase: Passion Tour 6 on July 4, 2010. He won the fight by majority decision.

Tahara was scheduled to fight Mitsuhisa Sunabe in a light flyweight title eliminator match at Pancrase: Passion Tour 8 on September 5, 2010. Sunabe won the fight by a third-round stoppage, knocking Tahara out with a slam. Seven months later, on April 29, 2011, Tahara lost to Yuki Shojo at Shooto: Shooto Tradition 2011 by unanimous decision. It was the first time his professional career, that Tahara lost back-to-back fights.

==== Pancrase light flyweight title run ====
Tahara was scheduled to face Akinobu Watanabe at Shooto - Gig Tokyo 11 on August 25, 2012, and won the fight by majority decision. Tahara was next scheduled to face Takuya Eizumi at Pancrase - 245 on February 3, 2013. Tahara was scheduled to rematch Hiroyuki Abe at Pancrase - 248 on June 30, 2013, six years after their first meeting. Tahara was more successful in the rematch, winning the fight by a 40-second knockout.

Pancrase rewarded Tahara for his three fight winning streak with the opportunity to challenge the reigning light flyweight champion Mitsuhisa Sunabe at Pancrase 252 - 20th Anniversary on September 29, 2013. Sunabe won the fight by unanimous decision, with scores of 30-29, 30-28 and 30-29.

== Mixed martial arts record ==
Professional record breakdown
| 20 matches | 12 wins | 7 losses |
| By knockout | 5 | 1 |
| By submission | 1 | 0 |
| By decision | 6 | 6 |
| Draws | 1 | |

| Res. | Record | Opponent | Method | Event | Date | Round | Time | Location | Notes |
|---|---|---|---|---|---|---|---|---|---|
| Loss | 12–7–1 | Mitsuhisa Sunabe | Decision (unanimous) | Pancrase 252 - 20th Anniversary | September 29, 2013 | 3 | 5:00 | Yokohama, Kanagawa, Japan | For the Pancrase Light Flyweight Championship. |
| Win | 12–6–1 | Hiroyuki Abe | TKO (punches) | Pancrase - 248 | June 30, 2013 | 1 | 0:40 | Tokyo, Japan | |
| Win | 11–6–1 | Takuya Eizumi | Decision (unanimous) | Pancrase - 245 | February 3, 2013 | 3 | 5:00 | Tokyo, Japan | |
| Win | 10–6–1 | Akinobu Watanabe | Decision (majority) | Shooto - Gig Tokyo 11 | August 25, 2012 | 3 | 5:00 | Tokyo, Japan | |
| Loss | 9–6–1 | Yuki Shojo | Decision (unanimous) | Shooto: Shooto Tradition 2011 | April 29, 2011 | 3 | 5:00 | Tokyo, Japan | |
| Loss | 9–5–1 | Mitsuhisa Sunabe | KO (slam) | Pancrase: Passion Tour 8 | September 5, 2010 | 3 | 2:32 | Tokyo, Japan | |
| Win | 9–4–1 | Toshimichi Akagi | Decision (majority) | Pancrase: Passion Tour 6 | July 4, 2010 | 3 | 5:00 | Shiki, Saitama, Japan | |
| Win | 8–4–1 | Junji Ikoma | TKO (punches) | Shooto: Border: Season 2: Vibration | March 28, 2010 | 3 | 3:31 | Osaka, Japan | |
| Loss | 7–4–1 | Rambaa Somdet | Decision (unanimous) | Shooto: Revolutionary Exchanges 3 | November 23, 2009 | 3 | 5:00 | Tokyo, Japan | For the vacant Shooto Flyweight Championship. |
| Win | 7–3–1 | Jesse Taitano | Decision (unanimous) | Shooto: Gig Saitama 1 | August 9, 2009 | 3 | 5:00 | Tokyo, Japan | 119lbs catchweight bout. |
| Win | 6–3–1 | Shinya Murofushi | TKO (punches) | Shooto: Shooting Disco 9: Superman | June 6, 2009 | 3 | 4:09 | Tokyo, Japan | |
| Draw | 5–3–1 | Takehiro Harusaki | Draw (split) | Shooto: Kitazawa Shooto 2009 Vol. 1 | March 20, 2009 | 3 | 5:00 | Tokyo, Japan | |
| Loss | 5–3 | Rambaa Somdet | Decision (unanimous) | Shooto: Shooto Tradition 3 | September 28, 2008 | 3 | 5:00 | Tokyo, Japan | |
| Win | 5–2 | Atsushi Takeuchi | Submission (armbar) | Shooto: Shooting Disco 5: Earth, Wind and Fighter | June 21, 2008 | 2 | 3:26 | Tokyo, Japan | |
| Win | 4–2 | Katsuya Murofushi | TKO (cut) | Shooto: Shooto Tradition 1 | May 3, 2008 | 2 | 0:46 | Tokyo, Japan | |
| Win | 3–2 | Takehiro Ishii | Decision (unanimous) | Shooto: Shooting Disco 4: Born in the Fighting | February 23, 2008 | 2 | 5:00 | Tokyo, Japan | |
| Win | 2–2 | Junji Ito | Decision (unanimous) | Shooto: Shooting Disco 3: Everybody Fight Now | October 20, 2007 | 2 | 5:00 | Tokyo, Japan | |
| Loss | 1–2 | Hiroyuki Abe | Technical Decision (unanimous) | Shooto 2007: 6/30 in Kitazawa Town Hall | June 30, 2007 | 2 | 0:42 | Tokyo, Japan | |
| Win | 1–1 | Kenichi Sawada | TKO (corner stoppage) | Shooto: 11/30 in Kitazawa Town Hall | November 30, 2006 | 2 | 4:57 | Tokyo, Japan | |
| Loss | 0–1 | Takeshi Yamada | Decision (unanimous) | Shooto: 3/3 in Kitazawa Town Hall | March 3, 2006 | 2 | 5:00 | Tokyo, Japan | |

== See also ==
- List of Shooto champions
- List of Pancrase champions
