= Mikihito Yamagami =

Japanese martial artist

- Born: June 22, 1987 (age 39); Fujimi, Saitama, Japan
- Native name: 山上 幹臣
- Nationality: Japanese
- Height: 5 ft 8 in (1.73 m)
- Weight: 125 lb (57 kg; 8.9 st)
- Division: Flyweight
- Style: Kickboxing
- Stance: Southpaw
- Fighting out of: Saitama, Japan
- Team: Comprehensive Fighting Dojo STF
- Years active: 2008 - 2014

Mixed martial arts record
- Total: 14
- Wins: 10
- By knockout: 3
- By submission: 2
- By decision: 5
- Losses: 4
- By submission: 1
- By decision: 3

Other information
- Mixed martial arts record from Sherdog

Mikihito Yamagami (山上幹臣, Yamagami Mikihito; born June 22, 1987) is a retired Japanese mixed martial artist who competed in the Strawweight divisions of Shooto and Road Fighting Championship. He is the former Shooto Flyweight (114 lb, 52 kg) Champion.

Fight Matrix ranks him as the fifth greatest strawweight in mixed martial arts history.

== Mixed martial arts career ==
=== Early career ===
Yamagami made his professional debut on August 3, 2008, at Shooto: Gig Central 15, against Hiroyuki Kondo, in the Shooto Flyweight Rookie Tournament quarterfinals. He won the fight by majority decision. After beating Yusuke Sato at Shooto: Shooting Disco 6: Glory Shines In You by a second-round knockout, Yamagami was scheduled to fight Junji Ito at Shooto: The Rookie Tournament 2008 Final in the Rookie Tournament finals. Yamagami won the fight by a guillotine choke midway through the second round.

After losing his next two fights to Atsushi Takeuchi and Takehiro Ishii by decision and submission respectively, Yamagami rebounded with a unanimous decision win against Takehiro Harusaki at Shooto: Gig Saitama 2.

=== Shooto title reign ===
Following two more decision wins against the future Shooto Flyweight champion Shinya Murofushi and against Atsushi Takeuchi, Yamagami was given the chance to fight Junji Ikoma for the Shooto World Flyweight (114 lb) Championship, at Shooto: Shooto the Shoot 2011. Yamagami won the title by a first round stoppage, knocking Ikoma out after just 41 seconds.

Yamagami was scheduled to make his first title defense at Shooto - 10th Round, in a rematch with Junji Ito. Yamagami won the fight by a second-round rear-naked choke.

Nine months after his first title defense, Yamagami was scheduled to fight Mamoru Yamaguchi at Vale Tudo Japan - VTJ 1st. He won the fight by majority decision.

=== Later career ===
Yamagami was next scheduled to fight Narongchai Dragontail at HEAT 29, on December 15, 2013. He won the fight by a first-round TKO.

Yamagami fought outside of Japan for the first time at Road FC 14, when he was scheduled to meet Nam Jin Jo. He lost the fight by unanimous decision.

Yamagami was scheduled to fight Jae Nam Yoo at Road FC 20. He lost the fight by unanimous decision.

== Championships and accomplishments ==
=== Mixed martial arts ===
- Shooto
  - Shooto World Flyweight (114 lb) Championship
    - One successful title defense
  - Shooto 2008 Flyweight (114 lb) rookie championship

== Mixed martial arts record ==
Professional record breakdown
14 matches	10 wins	4 losses
By knockout	3	0
By submission	2	1
By decision	5	3

Res.	Record	Opponent	Method	Event	Date	Round	Time	Location	Notes
Loss	10–4	Jae Nam Yoo	Decision (unanimous)	Road FC 20	December 14, 2014	2	3:00	Seoul, South Korea	
Loss	10–3	Nam Jin Jo	Decision (unanimous)	Road FC 14	February 9, 2014	3	5:00	Seoul, South Korea	
Win	10–2	Narongchai Dragontail	TKO (punches)	Heat - Heat 29	December 15, 2013	1	2:53	Tokyo, Japan	
Win	9–2	Mamoru Yamaguchi	Decision (majority)	Vale Tudo Japan - VTJ 1st	June 22, 2013	3	5:00	Tokyo, Japan	
Win	8–2	Junji Ito	Technical Submission (rear-naked choke)	Shooto - 10th Round	September 30, 2012	2	1:36	Tokyo, Japan	Defended Shooto World Flyweight (114 lb) Championship
Win	7–2	Junji Ikoma	KO (punch)	Shooto: Shooto the Shoot 2011	November 5, 2011	1	0:41	Tokyo, Japan	Won Shooto World Flyweight (114 lb) Championship
Win	6–2	Atsushi Takeuchi	Decision (unanimous)	Shooto: Shooto Tradition 2011	April 29, 2011	3	5:00	Tokyo, Japan	
Win	5–2	Shinya Murofushi	Decision (majority)	Shooto: The Way of Shooto 6: Like a Tiger, Like a Dragon	November 19, 2010	2	5:00	Tokyo, Japan	
Win	4–2	Takehiro Harusaki	Decision (unanimous)	Shooto: Gig Saitama 2	July 4, 2010	2	5:00	Saitama, Japan	
Loss	3–2	Takehiro Ishii	Technical Submission (americana)	Shooto: Gig Saitama 1	August 9, 2009	1	4:21	Saitama, Japan	
Loss	3–1	Atsushi Takeuchi	Decision (unanimous)	Shooto: Kitazawa Shooto 2009 Vol. 1	May 20, 2009	2	5:00	Tokyo, Japan	
Win	3–0	Junji Ito	Submission (guillotine choke)	Shooto: The Rookie Tournament 2008 Final	December 13, 2008	2	2:15	Tokyo, Japan	Shooto 2008 Flyweight (114lb) rookie championship tournament finals
Win	2–0	Yusuke Sato	KO (punch)	Shooto: Shooting Disco 6: Glory Shines In You	October 5, 2008	2	0:18	Tokyo, Japan	Shooto 2008 Flyweight (114lb) rookie championship tournament semifinals
Win	1–0	Hiroyuki Kondo	Decision (majority)	Shooto: Gig Central 15	August 3, 2008	2	5:00	Aichi, Japan	Shooto 2008 Flyweight (114lb) rookie championship tournament quarterfinals

== See also ==
- List of male mixed martial artists
