= Kenichi Sawada =

Japanese mixed martial arts fighter

- Born: December 13, 1975 (age 50); Japan
- Nationality: Japanese
- Height: 5 ft 3 in (1.60 m)
- Weight: 120 lb (54 kg; 8.6 st)
- Division: Flyweight
- Team: Paraestra Tokyo
- Years active: 2002 - 2015

Mixed martial arts record
- Total: 36
- Wins: 10
- By knockout: 2
- By decision: 8
- Losses: 22
- By knockout: 5
- By submission: 9
- By decision: 8
- Draws: 4

Other information
- Mixed martial arts record from Sherdog

Kenichi Sawada (born December 13, 1975) is a Japanese mixed martial artist. He competed in the flyweight division.

== Mixed martial arts record ==
Professional record breakdown
36 matches	10 wins	22 losses
By knockout	2	5
By submission	0	9
By decision	8	8
Draws	4	

Res.	Record	Opponent	Method	Event	Date	Round	Time	Location	Notes
Win	10-22-4	Noriyuki Takei	Decision (majority)	Shooto: Torao 16	September 21, 2015	2	5:00	Tokyo, Japan	
Loss	9-22-4	Takamasa Kiuchi	Submission (Armbar)	Zst: Zst 45	April 12, 2015	1	1:29	Tokyo, Japan	
Loss	9-21-4	Junji Ito	KO (Punches)	Shooto: Gig Tokyo 18	February 11, 2015	2	2:04	Tokyo, Japan	
Loss	9-20-4	Kaito Sakamaki	Submission (Guillotine Choke)	Zst: Zst 43	November 23, 2014	1	3:08	Tokyo, Japan	
Win	9-19-4	Toru Sakakibara	Decision (Majority)	Zst: Zst 42	August 31, 2014	2	5:00	Tokyo, Japan	
Loss	8-19-4	Yusuke Uehara	Decision (Majority)	Zst: Zst 40	April 12, 2014	2	5:00	Tokyo, Japan	
Loss	8-18-4	Rambaa Somdet	Decision (Unanimous)	Grabaka: Grabaka Live! 3	October 27, 2013	2	5:00	Tokyo, Japan	
Win	8-17-4	Ryota Uozumi	Decision (Unanimous)	Zst: Zst 36	July 14, 2013	2	5:00	Tokyo, Japan	
Loss	7-17-4	Ryo Hatta	Submission (Rear-Naked Choke)	Zst: Zst 34	February 11, 2013	1	4:38	Tokyo, Japan	
Loss	7-16-4	Akihito Sasao	KO (Head Kick)	Shooto: Border: Season 4: Third	December 9, 2012	1	1:58	Osaka, Kansai, Japan	
Loss	7-15-4	Takafumi Ato	Decision (Split)	Shooto: Shooting Disco 19: Reborn	October 7, 2012	3	5:00	Tokyo, Japan	
Loss	7-14-4	Yuichiro Yajima	Submission (Arm-Triangle Choke)	Rings: Battle Genesis Vol. 10	May 27, 2012	1	3:01	Tokyo, Japan	
Loss	7-13-4	Jun Nakamura	Submission (Armbar)	Shooto: Gig Central 24: Love and Courage	February 12, 2012	2	2:30	Nagoya, Aichi, Japan	
Win	7-12-4	Yuya Kaneuchi	KO (Punch)	Pancrase: Impressive Tour 11	November 12, 2011	2	1:20	Tokyo, Japan	
Loss	6-12-4	Tadaaki Yamamoto	Decision (Unanimous)	Shooto: Gig Central 23	October 2, 2011	2	5:00	Nagoya, Aichi, Japan	
Win	6-11-4	Jun Nabeshima	TKO (Doctor Stoppage)	Shooto: Kitazawa Shooto Vol. 4	September 17, 2010	2	1:24	Tokyo, Japan	
Win	5-11-4	Shuichiro Okumura	Decision (Unanimous)	Shooto: Gig Saitama 2	July 4, 2010	2	5:00	Shiki, Saitama, Japan	
Loss	4-11-4	Tatsuya Yamamoto	TKO (Punches)	Shooto: Gig North 5	February 14, 2010	1	1:39	Sapporo, Hokkaido, Japan	
Draw	4-10-4	Keisuke Kurata	Draw	Shooto: Gig Central 19	October 25, 2009	2	5:00	Nagoya, Aichi, Japan	
Win	4-10-3	Atsushi Mochizuki	Decision (Unanimous)	Shooto: Gig North 4	June 7, 2009	2	5:00	Sapporo, Hokkaido, Japan	
Loss	3-10-3	Junji Ito	Submission (Rear-Naked Choke)	Shooto: Gig Tokyo 2	April 19, 2009	2	0:47	Tokyo, Japan	
Draw	3-9-3	Teppei Masuda	Draw	Shooto: Gig Central 16	October 26, 2008	2	5:00	Nagoya, Aichi, Japan	
Loss	3-9-2	Hiroyuki Abe	Submission (Armbar)	Shooto: 6/26 in Kitazawa Town Hall	June 26, 2008	1	4:13	Setagaya, Tokyo, Japan	
Loss	3-8-2	Katsuya Murofushi	Submission (Triangle Choke)	Shooto: 3/21 in Kitazawa Town Hall	March 21, 2008	1	1:53	Setagaya, Tokyo, Japan	
Win	3-7-2	Takehiro Ishii	Decision (Unanimous)	Shooto: Shooting Disco 3: Everybody Fight Now	October 20, 2007	2	5:00	Tokyo, Japan	
Draw	2-7-2	Shinya Murofushi	Draw	Shooto: Back To Our Roots 3	May 18, 2007	2	5:00	Tokyo, Japan	
Loss	2-7-1	Takehiro Harusaki	Decision (Split)	Shooto: Battle Mix Tokyo 2	March 30, 2007	2	5:00	Tokyo, Japan	
Loss	2-6-1	Noboru Tahara	TKO (Corner Stoppage)	Shooto: 11/30 in Kitazawa Town Hall	November 30, 2006	2	4:57	Setagaya, Tokyo, Japan	
Win	2-5-1	Tomohiko Yoshida	Decision (Unanimous)	Shooto: Gig Central 10	September 17, 2006	2	5:00	Shooto: Gig Central 10	
Win	1-5-1	Hiroaki Takezawa	Decision (Unanimous)	Shooto 2005: 11/29 in Kitazawa Town Hall	November 29, 2005	2	5:00	Setagaya, Tokyo, Japan	
Loss	0-5-1	Takehiro Ishii	TKO (Swollen Eye)	Shooto: 5/29 in Kitazawa Town Hall	May 29, 2005	1	5:00	Setagaya, Tokyo, Japan	
Loss	0-4-1	Shinichi Kojima	Technical Submission (Rear Naked Choke)	Shooto: 7/16 in Korakuen Hall	July 16, 2004	2	3:34	Tokyo, Japan	
Loss	0-3-1	Yutaka Tetsuka	Decision (Unanimous)	Shooto: 11/25 in Kitazawa Town Hall	November 25, 2003	2	5:00	Setagaya, Tokyo, Japan	
Draw	0-2-1	Tetsuya Akihisa	Draw	Shooto: Gig West 4	October 12, 2003	2	5:00	Osaka, Kansai, Japan	
Loss	0-2	Yasuhiro Akagi	Decision (Majority)	Shooto: Gig Central 3	March 30, 2003	2	5:00	Nagoya, Aichi, Japan	
Loss	0-1	Keisuke Kurata	Decision (Unanimous)	Shooto: Gig Central 2	October 6, 2002	2	5:00	Nagoya, Aichi, Japan	

== See also ==
- List of male mixed martial artists
