= Joshua Pacio =

Filipino mixed martial arts fighter (born 1996)

- Born: Joshua Felix Pacio; January 10, 1996 (age 30); La Trinidad, Benguet, Philippines
- Other names: The Passion
- Height: 165 cm (5 ft 5 in)
- Weight: 56.7 kg (125 lb; 9 st)
- Division: Strawweight
- Reach: 67 in (170 cm)
- Stance: Orthodox
- Fighting out of: Philippines
- Team: Team Lakay Wushu (2007–2023); Lions Nation MMA (2023–present)
- Rank: Purple belt in Brazilian jiu jitsu under Gibran Langbayan
- Years active: 2013–present

Mixed martial arts record
- Total: 30
- Wins: 25
- By knockout: 9
- By submission: 10
- By decision: 5
- By disqualification: 1
- Losses: 5
- By knockout: 1
- By submission: 2
- By decision: 2

Other information
- Mixed martial arts record from Sherdog

Joshua Felix Pacio (born January 10, 1996) is a Filipino mixed martial artist who competes in the Strawweight division of ONE Championship. He is the three-time and current ONE Strawweight World Champion.

== Early life and education ==
Joshua Pacio is of Igorot descent, growing up in La Trinidad, Benguet. He had to learn to be independent at an early age after his father worked overseas to provide for his family. Pacio got exposed to martial arts at the early age of 11, where he started working on his kickboxing, before transitioning to Wushu at age 13. Pacio took up Hotel and Restaurant Management at the University of the Cordilleras in Baguio

== Mixed martial arts career ==
=== Early mixed martial arts career ===
Pacio made his debut at Team Lakay Championship 8, where he came away with a first-round TKO over Denver Songaben. This would be a start off red-hot six-match winning streak which eventually led to him being signed by ONE Championship.

He made his ONE Championship debut on April 15, 2016 - beating compatriot Rabin Catalan by second-round technical knockout at ONE Championship: Global Rivals at the Mall of Asia Arena in the Philippines.

After beating Kritsada Kongsrichai, Pacio earned his first shot at the ONE Strawweight World Championship against Yoshitaka Naito at ONE Championship: State of Warriors on October 17, 2016, in Yangon.

Pacio came close to being a World Champion at age 20, as he punished Naito with his patented Wushu strikes on the feet, but a mishap in the third round cost him the entire match as he got submitted by the Japanese via rear naked choke.

=== First world title reign ===
After his loss to Naito, Pacio would wreak havoc in the division - winning five of his next six bouts to book another date with Naito this time at ONE: Conquest of Heroes on September 23, 2018, in Jakarta Indonesia.

Pacio rematched Yoshitaka Naito at ONE Championship: Conquest of Heroes on September 22, 2018. Pacio looked more confident in the rematch as he stuffed Naito's takedowns for much of the first two rounds while punishing him on the striking department with lightning quick kicks and combinations from different angles. The Japanese did finish strong as he scored takedowns on his younger opponent, but Pacio stayed busy even on his back - earning all of the judges' nod to get a unanimous decision victory.

=== Losing the belt, second reign ===
Pacio's reign, however, would not last long as he dropped his belt four months later to Yosuke Saruta at ONE Championship: Eternal Glory on January 19, 2019, in a controversial split-decision.

The Japanese pushed the action while Pacio opted to pick his spots and counter in one of his more tactical bouts yet. In the end, two of the judges favored Saruta's aggression - crowning him the new ONE Strawweight World Champion.

With a close finish, Pacio was given an outright rematch at ONE Championship: Roots of Honor in Manila on April 12, 2019 Pacio did not disappoint as he scored a sensational fourth-round knockout win with a well-timed knee to regain his lost title.

Later that night, ONE Chairman and CEO Chatri Sityodtong announced that there would be no need for an immediate trilogy after Pacio's definitive win.

Pacio defended his belt for the first time in his second reign as he takes on compatriot Rene Catalan at ONE Championship: Masters of Fate in Manila on November 8, 2019. He defeated Catalan via arm-triangle choke in the second round.

Pacio defended his title again against Alex Silva at ONE Championship: Fire and Fury on January 31, 2020. He won the very close bout via split decision.

Pacio defended his ONE Strawweight World Championship in a trilogy match against Yosuke Saruta at ONE Championship: Revolution on September 24, 2021. He won the bout via TKO in the first round.

Pacio was expected to make his fourth title defense against the #1 ranked strawweight contender Jarred Brooks at ONE 158 on June 3, 2022. The bout was eventually postponed, as Brooks withdrew from the fight due to an injury. The fight was rescheduled at ONE 164 on December 3, 2022. Pacio lost the fight and the belt by unanimous decision, making him and the Philippines had no more Filipino World Champions of any weight classes.

=== Post-championship and third reign ===
Pacio faced Mansur Malachiev on October 7, 2023, at ONE Fight Night 15. He won the fight via unanimous decision.

Pacio faced Jarred Brooks for the ONE Strawweight World Championship in a rematch on March 1, 2024, at ONE 166. He won the title via disqualification due to illegal slam in round one.

The trilogy bout between Pacio and Brooks for the unification of the ONE Strawweight MMA World Championship took place on February 20, 2025, at ONE 171. Despite Brooks spending the majority of the first round in top control, Pacio won the fight via technical knockout in round two upset.

Joshua was scheduled to make his second title defense of the ONE Strawweight MMA World Championship, in a rematch against Mansur Malachiev, at The Inner Circle 21, on July 10, 2026. He won the fight in the first round by submission, due to a rear naked choke.

== Titles and accomplishments ==
- ONE Championship
  - ONE Strawweight World Champion (three times; current)
    - Three successful title defences (second reign)
    - Two consecutive title defenses (third reign)

== Mixed martial arts record ==
Professional record breakdown
30 matches	25 wins	5 losses
By knockout	9	1
By submission	10	2
By decision	5	2
By disqualification	1	0

Res.	Record	Opponent	Method	Event	Date	Round	Time	Location	Notes
Win	25–5	Keito Yamakita	Technical Submission (arm-triangle choke)	ONE Samurai 5	November 18, 2026	4	4:17	Tokyo, Japan	Defended the ONE Strawweight Championship (125 lb).
Win	24–5	Mansur Malachiev	Technical Submission (rear-naked choke)	ONE: The Inner Circle 21	July 10, 2026	1	4:23	Bangkok, Thailand	Defended the ONE Strawweight Championship (125 lb).
Loss	23–5	Yuya Wakamatsu	TKO (knees)	ONE 173	November 16, 2025	2	0:54	Tokyo, Japan	For the ONE Flyweight Championship (135 lb).
Win	23–4	Jarred Brooks	TKO (punches)	ONE 171	February 20, 2025	2	4:22	Lusail, Qatar	Defended and unified the ONE Strawweight Championship (125 lb) Performance of the Night.
Win	22–4	Jarred Brooks	DQ (illegal slam)	ONE 166	March 1, 2024	1	0:56	Lusail, Qatar	Won the ONE Strawweight Championship (125 lb).
Win	21–4	Mansur Malachiev	Decision (unanimous)	ONE Fight Night 15	October 7, 2023	3	5:00	Bangkok, Thailand	
Loss	20–4	Jarred Brooks	Decision (unanimous)	ONE 164	December 3, 2022	5	5:00	Pasay, Philippines	Lost the ONE Strawweight Championship (125 lb).
Win	20–3	Yosuke Saruta	TKO (punches)	ONE: Revolution	September 24, 2021	1	3:38	Kallang, Singapore	Defended the ONE Strawweight Championship (125 lb).
Win	19–3	Alex Silva	Decision (split)	ONE: Fire and Fury	January 31, 2020	5	5:00	Pasay, Philippines	Defended the ONE Strawweight Championship (125 lb).
Win	18–3	Rene Catalan	Submission (arm-triangle choke)	ONE: Masters of Fate	November 8, 2019	2	2:29	Pasay, Philippines	Defended the ONE Strawweight Championship (125 lb).
Win	17–3	Yosuke Saruta	KO (head kick)	ONE: Roots of Honor	April 12, 2019	4	2:42	Pasay, Philippines	Won the ONE Strawweight Championship (125 lb).
Loss	16–3	Yosuke Saruta	Decision (split)	ONE: Eternal Glory	January 19, 2019	5	5:00	Jakarta, Indonesia	Lost the ONE Strawweight Championship (125 lb).
Win	16–2	Yoshitaka Naito	Decision (unanimous)	ONE: Conquest of Heroes	September 22, 2018	5	5:00	Jakarta, Indonesia	Won the ONE Strawweight Championship (125 lb).
Win	15–2	Pongsiri Mitsatit	Submission (hammerlock)	ONE: Reign of Kings	July 27, 2018	1	3:37	Pasay, Philippines	
Win	14–2	Ming Qiang Liang	Submission (rear-naked choke)	ONE: Global Superheroes	January 26, 2018	1	4:01	Pasay, Philippines	
Win	13–2	Roy Doliguez	KO (spinning backfist)	ONE: Legends of the World	November 10, 2017	2	0:38	Pasay, Philippines	Strawweight bout.
Loss	12–2	Hayato Suzuki	Submission (rear-naked choke)	ONE: Kings and Conquerors	August 5, 2017	1	3:17	Macau, SAR, China	Return to Flyweight.
Win	12–1	Dejdamrong Sor Amnuaysirichoke	Decision (split)	ONE: Warrior Kingdom	March 11, 2017	3	5:00	Bangkok, Thailand	
Loss	11–1	Yoshitaka Naito	Submission (rear-naked choke)	ONE: State of Warriors	October 7, 2016	3	1:33	Yangon, Myanmar	For the ONE Strawweight Championship (125 lb).
Win	11–0	Kritsada Kongsrichai	Submission (rear-naked choke)	ONE: Heroes of the World	August 13, 2016	1	4:37	Macau, SAR, China	Flyweight bout.
Win	10–0	Rabin Catalan	TKO (punches)	ONE: Global Rivals	April 15, 2016	2	3:19	Pasay, Philippines	Catchweight (127 lb) bout.
Win	8–0	Roy Menzi Jr.	Submission (guillotine choke)	Team Lakay Championship 10	March 26, 2016	3	2:05	La Trinidad, Benguet, Philippines	
Win	7–0	Janito Bayot	Submission (guillotine choke)	Team Lakay Championship 10	March 26, 2016	1	2:02	La Trinidad, Philippines	Strawweight debut.
Win	6–0	Joco Mabute	Submission (kimura)	Pacific Xtreme Combat: Laban Baguio 4	February 27, 2016	2	2:41	Baguio, Philippines	
Win	5–0	Ric Myler Empil	TKO (doctor stoppage)	Pacific Xtreme Combat: Laban Baguio 3	December 18, 2015	1	3:23	Baguio, Philippines	
Win	4–0	Mark Joseph Abrillo	Submission (rear-naked choke)	Spartacus MMA	October 24, 2015	2	1:39	Manila, Philippines	
Win	3–0	Jordan Lobida	KO (punch)	Fullcon FC 2	August 1, 2015	1	3:41	Baguio, Philippines	
Win	2–0	Ignacio Galindez	TKO (submission to punches)	Team Lakay Championship 9	March 21, 2015	1	0:00	La Trinidad, Philippines	
Win	1–0	Denver Songaben	TKO	Team Lakay Championship 8	December 14, 2013	1	0:00	Baguio, Philippines	Flyweight debut.
