= 2010 in Shooto =

Mixed martial arts events

Information
- First date: January 23, 2010
- Last date: December 26, 2010

Events
- Total events: 28

Fights
- Total fights: 233
- Title fights: 5

Chronology
2009 in Shooto	2010 in Shooto	2011 in Shooto

The year 2010 is the 22nd year in the history of Shooto, a mixed martial arts promotion based in Japan. In 2010 Shooto held 28 events beginning with, Shooto: The Way of Shooto 1: Like a Tiger, Like a Dragon.

== Title fights ==
Title fights in 2010
Weight class				Method	Round	Time	Event	Notes
Bantamweight	Shuichiro Katsumura	def.	Masakatsu Ueda (c)	Submission (Brabo Choke)	2	3:39	Shooto: The Way of Shooto 2: Like a Tiger, Like a Dragon	(Note: For the Bantamweight Championship.)
Featherweight	Hatsu Hioki	def.	Takeshi Inoue (c)	Decision (Split)	3	5:00	Shooto: The Way of Shooto 3: Like a Tiger, Like a Dragon	(Note: For the Featherweight Championship.)
Lightweight	Willamy Freire (c)	def.	Yusuke Endo	Decision (Split)	3	5:00	Shooto: The Way of Shooto 3: Like a Tiger, Like a Dragon	(Note: For the Lightweight Championship.)
Flyweight	Yasuhiro Urushitani	def.	Ryuichi Miki	Decision (Unanimous)	3	5:00	Shooto: The Way of Shooto 3: Like a Tiger, Like a Dragon	(Note: For the Flyweight Championship.)
Strawweight	Rambaa Somdet (c)	def.	Hiroyuki Abe	TKO (Doctor Stoppage)	1	4:31	Shooto: The Way of Shooto 4: Like a Tiger, Like a Dragon	(Note: For the Strawweight Championship.)

== Events list ==
#	Event title	Date	Arena	Location
313	Shooto: Border: Season 2: Immovable	December 26, 2010	Hirano Ward Community Hall	Osaka, Kansai, Japan
312	Shooto: The Rookie Tournament 2010 Final	December 18, 2010	Shinjuku Face	Tokyo, Japan
311	Shooto: The Way of Shooto 6: Like a Tiger, Like a Dragon	November 19, 2010	Korakuen Hall	Tokyo, Japan
310	Shooto: Gig Central 21	October 24, 2010	Asunal Kanayama Hall	Nagoya, Aichi, Japan
309	Shooto: Shooting Disco 13: Can't Stop Myself!	October 16, 2010	Shinjuku Face	Tokyo, Japan
308	Shooto: Gig West 12	September 26, 2010	Abeno Ward Hall	Osaka, Kansai, Japan
307	Shooto: The Way of Shooto 5: Like a Tiger, Like a Dragon	September 23, 2010	Korakuen Hall	Tokyo, Japan
306	Shooto: Kitazawa Shooto Vol. 4	September 17, 2010	Kitazawa Town Hall	Tokyo, Japan
305	Shooto: Gig North 6	August 29, 2010	Zepp Sapporo	Sapporo, Hokkaido, Japan
304	Shooto: Border: Season 2: Rhythm	August 15, 2010	Hirano Ward Community Hall	Osaka, Kansai, Japan
303	Shooto: Gig Tokyo 5	August 7, 2010	Shinjuku Face	Tokyo, Japan
302	Shooto: The Way of Shooto 4: Like a Tiger, Like a Dragon	July 19, 2010	Korakuen Hall	Tokyo, Japan
301	Shooto: Gig Saitama 2	July 4, 2010	Pal City Civic Hall	Shiki, Saitama, Japan
300	Shooto: Spirit 2010 Summer	June 27, 2010	Accel Hall	Sendai, Miyagi, Japan
299	Shooto: Gig Central 20	June 13, 2010	Zepp Nagoya	Nagoya, Aichi, Japan
298	Shooto: Shooting Disco 12: Stand By Me	June 6, 2010	Shinjuku Face	Tokyo, Japan
297	Shooto: The Way of Shooto 3: Like a Tiger, Like a Dragon	May 30, 2010	Tokyo Dome City Hall	Tokyo, Japan
296	Shooto: Grapplingman 11	May 16, 2010	Hiroshima Industrial Hall	Hiroshima, Japan
295	Shooto: Kitazawa Shooto Vol. 3	May 9, 2010	Kitazawa Town Hall	Tokyo, Japan
294	Shooto: Gig Tokyo 4	April 24, 2010	Shinjuku Face	Tokyo, Japan
293	Shooto: Grapplingman 10	April 4, 2010	Mamakari Forum	Okayama, Japan
292	Shooto: Border: Season 2: Vibration	March 28, 2010	Hirano Ward Community Hall	Osaka, Kansai, Japan
291	Shooto: The Way of Shooto 2: Like a Tiger, Like a Dragon	March 22, 2010	Korakuen Hall	Tokyo, Japan
290	Shooto: Spirit 2010 Spring	March 7, 2010	Accel Hall	Sendai, Miyagi, Japan
289	Shooto: Shooting Disco 11: Tora Tora Tora!	February 27, 2010	Shinjuku Face	Tokyo, Japan
288	Shooto: Trilogy 1	February 21, 2010	Southernpia Hakata	Hakata-ku, Fukuoka
287	Shooto: Gig North 5	February 14, 2010	Zepp Sapporo	Sapporo, Hokkaido, Japan
286	Shooto: The Way of Shooto 1: Like a Tiger, Like a Dragon	January 23, 2010	Korakuen Hall	Tokyo, Japan

== Shooto: The Way of Shooto 1: Like a Tiger, Like a Dragon ==
Shooto: The Way of Shooto 1: Like a Tiger, Like a Dragon was an event held on January 23, 2010 at Korakuen Hall in Tokyo, Japan.

=== Results ===
Main Card
Weight class				Method	Round	Time	Notes
	Taiki Tsuchiya	def.	Hideki Kadowaki	Decision (Unanimous)	3	5:00
	Takeshi Inoue	def.	Gerald Lovato	Submission (Armbar)	3	4:11
	Hiroyuki Abe	def.	Atsushi Takeuchi	Decision (Unanimous)	3	5:00
	Yoshihiro Koyama	def.	Yutaka Ueda	Decision (Unanimous)	3	5:00
	Yoichiro Sato	def.	Takuya Sato	Submission (Rear-Naked Choke)	1	2:25
	Wataru Miki	def.	Jin Suk Jung	KO (Knee to the Body)	1	3:15
	Masumi Tozawa	def.	Keiji Koizumi	Decision (Unanimous)	2	5:00
	Yuki Okano	def.	Tetsuo Seto	Decision (Unanimous)	2	5:00
	Kosuke Suzuki	vs.	Yuya Kaneuchi	Draw	2	5:00

== Shooto: Gig North 5 ==
Shooto: Gig North 5 was an event held on February 14, 2010 at Zepp Sapporo in Sapporo, Hokkaido, Japan.

=== Results ===
Main Card
Weight class				Method	Round	Time	Notes
	Takuya Mori	def.	Toshimichi Akagi	TKO (Punches)	1	0:38
	Fumihiro Kitahara	def.	Ayumu Shioda	Decision (Unanimous)	3	5:00
	Daisuke Ishizawa	def.	Masaki Yanagisawa	Decision (Unanimous)	2	5:00
	Masato Fujiwara	vs.	Hidekazu Asakura	Draw	2	5:00
	Tatsuya Yamamoto	def.	Kenichi Sawada	TKO (Punches)	1	1:39
	Keisuke Kurata	def.	Atsushi Mochizuki	Decision (Majority)	2	5:00
	Takashi Niikuni	vs.	Ranki Kawana	Draw	2	5:00
	Yusuke Honma	def.	Isao Yoshida	Submission (Guillotine Choke)	1	1:07

== Shooto: Trilogy 1 ==
Shooto: Trilogy 1 was an event held on February 21, 2010 at Southernpia Hakata in Hakata-ku, Fukuoka.

=== Results ===
Main Card
Weight class				Method	Round	Time	Notes
	Nozomi Otsuka	def.	Hideru Inoue	Submission (Armbar)	1	1:08
	Nobuhiro Hayakawa	def.	Katsuhisa Akasaki	Submission (Rear-Naked Choke)	1	2:51
	Kazuya Satomoto	def.	Takamitsu Oba	Decision (Unanimous)	2	5:00
	Norio Tokuhisa	def.	Tadahiro Harada	Decision (Split)	2	5:00
	Hiroaki Nakayama	def.	Daijo Nosaka	Submission (Rear-Naked Choke)	2	2:50

== Shooto: Shooting Disco 11: Tora Tora Tora! ==
Shooto: Shooting Disco 11: Tora Tora Tora! was an event held on February 27, 2010 at Shinjuku Face in Tokyo, Japan.

=== Results ===
Main Card
Weight class				Method	Round	Time	Notes
	Junji Ito	def.	Hiroaki Yoshioka	Decision (Unanimous)	3	5:00
	Komei Okada	def.	Hideki Nishino	Submission (Rear-Naked Choke)	2	0:54
	Tatsuya Nakashima	def.	Yosuke Saruta	TKO (Arm Injury)	1	1:54
	Keita Kono	def.	Haruo Ochi	Decision (Unanimous)	2	5:00
	Yohei Suzuki	def.	Yuji Inoue	TKO (Punches)	1	1:13
	Kosuke Kindaichi	def.	Kenichiro Marui	KO (Knee)	2	2:35
	Hiroshi Osato	def.	Akinobu Watanabe	Decision (Majority)	2	5:00
	Yusaku Inoue	def.	Taijiro Iseki	Decision (Unanimous)	2	5:00
	Keita Ishibashi	def.	Hiroaki Ijima	Decision (Unanimous)	2	5:00
	Jun Nabeshima	def.	Takafumi Ato	Decision (Majority)	2	5:00
	Yoshifumi Nakamura	def.	Takayuki Hirose	Decision (Unanimous)	2	5:00

== Shooto: Spirit 2010 Spring ==
Shooto: Spirit 2010 Spring was an event held on March 7, 2010 at Accel Hall in Sendai, Miyagi, Japan.

=== Results ===
Main Card
Weight class				Method	Round	Time	Notes
	So Tazawa	vs.	Daisuke Ishizawa	Draw	2	5:00
	Toshiaki Hayasaka	vs.	Daiki Takashima	Draw	2	5:00
	Nariyasu Fujita	def.	Kazuyuki Yoshida	Submission (Guillotine Choke)	2	2:52
	Yo Saito	def.	Fumiya Sasaki	Submission (Guillotine Choke)	1	3:58
	Hiroshi Takano	def.	Takuya Ogura	Decision (Unanimous)	2	5:00
	Yoshikazu Fujiishi	def.	Yuya Onodera	TKO (Punches)	1	0:13

== Shooto: The Way of Shooto 2: Like a Tiger, Like a Dragon ==
Shooto: The Way of Shooto 2: Like a Tiger, Like a Dragon was an event held on March 22, 2010 at Korakuen Hall in Tokyo, Japan.

=== Results ===
Main Card
Weight class				Method	Round	Time	Notes
Bantamweight	Shuichiro Katsumura	def.	Masakatsu Ueda (c)	Submission (Brabo Choke)	2	3:39	(Note: For the Bantamweight Championship.)
	Yoichiro Sato	def.	Jung Min Kang	Submission (Guillotine Choke)	1	2:13
	Yuki Shojo	def.	Jesse Taitano	Decision (Unanimous)	3	5:00
	Katsuya Toida	def.	Yusuke Yachi	DQ (Illegal Upkick)	1	3:45
	Paolo Milano	vs.	Hisaki Hiraishi	Draw	2	5:00
	Kosuke Suzuki	def.	Yoshiyuki Takano	Decision (Unanimous)	2	5:00
	Yoshinori Suzuki	def.	Fumihiko Kawamura	Submission (Achilles Lock)	1	4:48
	Tomokazu Sato	def.	Shuichiro Okumura	Decision (Unanimous)	2	5:00
	Satoshi Inaba	vs.	Kensuke Nakamura	Draw	2	5:00

== Shooto: Border: Season 2: Vibration ==
Shooto: Border: Season 2: Vibration was an event held on March 28, 2010 at Hirano Ward Community Hall in Osaka, Kansai, Japan.

=== Results ===
Main Card
Weight class				Method	Round	Time	Notes
	Noboru Tahara	def.	Junji Ikoma	TKO (Punches)	3	3:31
	Daisuke Sugie	def.	Yukinari Tamura	Submission (Armbar)	2	4:09
	Kentaro Watanabe	def.	Ichaku Murata	Decision (Unanimous)	2	5:00
	Hiroshige Tanaka	def.	Tsuneo Kimura	KO (Punches)	1	3:54
	Ryuichiro Sumimura	def.	Yoshiaki Masuda	Decision (Unanimous)	2	5:00
	Tadaaki Yamamoto	def.	Toshio Mitani	Decision (Unanimous)	2	5:00
	Masayoshi Kato	def.	Takahiro Kohori	Decision (Unanimous)	2	5:00
	Bunpei Umezono	def.	Tomoya Suzuki	Decision (Majority)	2	5:00

== Shooto: Grapplingman 10 ==
Shooto: Grapplingman 10 was an event held on April 4, 2010 at Mamakari Forum in Okayama, Japan.

=== Results ===
Main Card
Weight class				Method	Round	Time	Notes
	Shinji Sasaki	def.	Guy Delumeau	Technical Submission (Armbar)	1	2:54
	Tenkei Oda	def.	Takumi Ota	Decision (Majority)	2	5:00
	Yuki Nishigo	def.	Jun Nagasoe	Submission (Rear-Naked Choke)	1	2:42
	Seiji Akao	def.	Yasuo Niki	Decision (Split)	2	5:00
	Tomohiko Yoshida	def.	Yoshitaka Aki	Submission (Kimura)	1	3:42
	Koji Kishimoto	def.	Noriyuki Takei	Submission (Armbar)	1	3:33
	Yamato Okada	def.	Takashi Murai	TKO (Punches)	1	2:17

== Shooto: Gig Tokyo 4 ==
Shooto: Gig Tokyo 4 was an event held on April 24, 2010 at Shinjuku Face in Tokyo, Japan.

=== Results ===
Main Card
Weight class				Method	Round	Time	Notes
	Fumihiro Kitahara	def.	Masaaki Sugawara	Decision (Majority)	3	5:00
	Takuya Mori	def.	Yusei Shimokawa	Decision (Unanimous)	3	5:00
	Toshimichi Akagi	def.	Nozomi Otsuka	Submission (Rear-Naked Choke)	1	1:45
	Jin Akimoto	def.	Kenji Hosoya	Submission (Guillotine Choke)	1	2:46
	Masumi Tozawa	def.	Yusuke Honma	Decision (Majority)	2	5:00
	Kota Shimoishi	def.	Daisuke Hoshino	Submission (Rear-Naked Choke)	2	3:02
	Yuki Yasunaga	def.	Satoru Enomoto	TKO (Corner Stoppage)	2	0:41
	Yoshinori Takahashi	def.	Keiji Sakuta	Decision (Majority)	2	5:00
	Atsushi Mochizuki	def.	Hiroyuki Shida	KO (Punches)	1	0:38
	Akira Okada	def.	Hideto Kondo	Decision (Unanimous)	2	5:00

== Shooto: Kitazawa Shooto Vol. 3 ==
Shooto: Kitazawa Shooto Vol. 3 was an event held on May 9, 2010 at Kitazawa Town Hall in Tokyo, Japan.

=== Results ===
Main Card
Weight class				Method	Round	Time	Notes
	Shinya Murofushi	def.	Takehiro Harusaki	Submission (Rear-Naked Choke)	3	2:29
	Masato Sannai	def.	Takahiro Hosoi	Decision (Unanimous)	2	5:00
	Naohiro Mizuno	def.	Gyung Jung Ju	KO (Punches)	1	0:25
	Yasutaka Ishigami	def.	Akinobu Watanabe	DQ (Accidental Kicks to the Groin)	2	2:14
	Masakazu Taguchi	def.	Yohei Ota	KO (Punches)	1	2:37
	Kyoji Horiguchi	def.	Ranki Kawana	Decision (Unanimous)	2	5:00
	Fumiya Sasaki	def.	Young Jin Hwang	KO (Punches)	1	1:46

== Shooto: Grapplingman 11 ==
Shooto: Grapplingman 11 was an event held on May 16, 2010 at Hiroshima Industrial Hall in Hiroshima, Japan.

=== Results ===
Main Card
Weight class				Method	Round	Time	Notes
	Bae Yong Kwon	def.	Kazuhiro Ito	Technical Submission (Rear-Naked Choke)	1	2:10
	Tsuyoshi Okada	def.	Shinobu Aoyama	Submission (Rear-Naked Choke)	1	2:46
	Tomohiro Hashi	def.	Tatsuro Kamei	Decision (Split)	2	5:00
	Teppei Masuda	def.	Koji Kishimoto	KO (Punches)	2	0:14
	Takaaki Oban	vs.	Yasushi Kato	Draw	2	5:00
	Motohiro Takenawa	def.	Hiroaki Nakayama	Decision (Majority)	2	5:00
	Shoki Omichi	def.	Yutaka Kimura	Decision (Unanimous)	2	5:00
	Naoji Mikoshiba	def.	Takayuki Kobayashi	KO (Punches)	1	0:48

== Shooto: The Way of Shooto 3: Like a Tiger, Like a Dragon ==
Shooto: The Way of Shooto 3: Like a Tiger, Like a Dragon was an event held on May 30, 2010 at Tokyo Dome City Hall in Tokyo, Japan.

=== Results ===
Main Card
Weight class				Method	Round	Time	Notes
Featherweight	Hatsu Hioki	def.	Takeshi Inoue (c)	Decision (Split)	3	5:00	(Note: For the Featherweight Championship.)
Lightweight	Willamy Freire (c)	def.	Yusuke Endo	Decision (Split)	3	5:00	(Note: For the Lightweight Championship.)
Flyweight	Yasuhiro Urushitani	def.	Ryuichi Miki	Decision (Unanimous)	3	5:00	(Note: For the Flyweight Championship.)
	Rumina Sato	def.	Ryota Matsune	TKO (Knee and Punches)	2	0:21
	Masakatsu Ueda	def.	Akitoshi Tamura	Decision (Unanimous)	3	5:00
	Eduardo Dantas	def.	Hiromasa Ougikubo	Submission (Rear-Naked Choke)	3	1:21
	Kotetsu Boku	def.	Yoshihiro Koyama	Decision (Unanimous)	3	5:00
	Shintaro Ishiwatari	def.	Wataru Miki	Decision (Majority)	2	5:00

== Shooto: Shooting Disco 12: Stand By Me ==
Shooto: Shooting Disco 12: Stand By Me was an event held on June 6, 2010 at Shinjuku Face in Tokyo, Japan.

=== Results ===
Main Card
Weight class				Method	Round	Time	Notes
	Teruyuki Matsumoto	def.	So Tazawa	Technical Submission (Armbar)	1	3:03
	Masaki Yanagisawa	def.	Komei Okada	Submission (Armbar)	1	0:15
	Yuta Nezu	def.	Keita Kono	Decision (Unanimous)	2	5:00
	Hisaki Hiraishi	def.	Shinobu Miura	Decision (Unanimous)	2	5:00
	Yusuke Sato	def.	Takehiro Ishii	Submission (Armbar)	1	2:58
	Yoshifumi Nakamura	def.	Satoshi Inaba	Decision (Unanimous)	2	5:00
	Yoshinori Suzuki	vs.	Yoshikazu Fujiishi	Draw	2	5:00
	Takafumi Ato	def.	Takahiro Kohori	Decision (Majority)	2	5:00
	Yuya Kaneuchi	def.	Keiji Koizumi	Decision (Unanimous)	2	5:00
	Kosuke Suzuki	def.	Hiroaki Ijima	KO (Flying Knee)	2	3:51

== Shooto: Gig Central 20 ==
Shooto: Gig Central 20 was an event held on June 13, 2010 at Zepp Nagoya in Nagoya, Aichi, Japan.

=== Results ===
Main Card
Weight class				Method	Round	Time	Notes
	Shinji Sasaki	def.	Daisuke Sugie	Decision (Split)	3	5:00
	Takasuke Kume	def.	Akihiro Yamazaki	Decision (Unanimous)	3	5:00
	Hiroyuki Tanaka	vs.	Yasuhiro Akagi	Draw	2	5:00
	Takahiro Kajita	def.	Michiyuki Ishibashi	Decision (Split)	2	5:00
	Hirosumi Sugiura	def.	Makoto Maeda	TKO (Punches)	1	0:37
	Kenya Kato	def.	Toshio Mitani	Submission (Armbar)	1	3:27
	Takeshi Kasugai	def.	Hidetaka Naka	Decision (Unanimous)	2	5:00
	Masanobu Mori	def.	Tomohiko Yoshida	Submission (Rear-Naked Choke)	2	3:00
	Yuta Sasaki	def.	Shinji Maeguchi	Submission (Rear-Naked Choke)	2	1:24

== Shooto: Spirit 2010 Summer ==
Shooto: Spirit 2010 Summer was an event held on June 27, 2010 at Accel Hall in Sendai, Miyagi, Japan.

=== Results ===
Main Card
Weight class				Method	Round	Time	Notes
	Yo Saito	def.	Kosuke Kindaichi	Decision (Unanimous)	2	5:00
	Hidekazu Asakura	def.	Yuya Onodera	TKO (Punches)	2	2:04
	Yusuke Honma	def.	Hiroshi Osato	Submission (Triangle Choke)	1	2:34
	Shinichi Hanawa	def.	Nariyasu Fujita	TKO (Punches)	1	3:52
	Takayuki Hirose	def.	Fumiya Sasaki	Decision (Majority)	2	5:00
	Takuya Ogura	def.	Takashi Niikuni	Decision (Unanimous)	2	5:00
	Kazuyuki Yoshida	def.	Hiroyuki Shida	Decision (Majority)	2	5:00

== Shooto: Gig Saitama 2 ==
Shooto: Gig Saitama 2 was an event held on July 4, 2010 at Pal City Civic Hall in Shiki, Saitama, Japan.

=== Results ===
Main Card
Weight class				Method	Round	Time	Notes
	Mikihito Yamagami	def.	Takehiro Harusaki	Decision (Unanimous)	2	5:00
	Noboru Tahara	def.	Toshimichi Akagi	Decision (Majority)	3	5:00
	Kosuke Kindaichi	def.	Junpei Chikano	Decision (Unanimous)	2	5:00
	Paolo Milano	def.	Masakazu Taguchi	Decision (Unanimous)	2	5:00
	Kazuhiro Ito	vs.	Hideki Nishino	Draw	2	5:00
	Kenichi Sawada	def.	Shuichiro Okumura	Decision (Unanimous)	2	5:00
	Yuki Yasunaga	def.	Yuki Nishigo	Decision (Unanimous)	2	5:00
	Yusaku Inoue	def.	Yuki Okano	Decision (Unanimous)	2	5:00

== Shooto: The Way of Shooto 4: Like a Tiger, Like a Dragon ==
Shooto: The Way of Shooto 4: Like a Tiger, Like a Dragon was an event held on July 19, 2010 at Korakuen Hall in Tokyo, Japan.

=== Results ===
Main Card
Weight class				Method	Round	Time	Notes
Strawweight	Rambaa Somdet (c)	def.	Hiroyuki Abe	TKO (Doctor Stoppage)	1	4:31	(Note: For the Strawweight Championship.)
	Taiki Tsuchiya	def.	Issei Tamura	Decision (Majority)	3	5:00
	Koetsu Okazaki	def.	Tetsu Suzuki	Decision (Unanimous)	3	5:00
	Kenichiro Togashi	def.	Jani Lax	TKO (Doctor Stoppage)	3	1:30
	Tenkei Oda	def.	Matteus Lahdesmaki	Submission (Punches)	1	4:08
	Shin Kochiwa	def.	Koshi Matsumoto	Decision (Unanimous)	2	5:00
	Daisuke Hoshino	def.	Kunio Nakajima	KO (Punches)	1	3:02
	Hiroshige Tanaka	def.	Takayoshi Ono	Decision (Majority)	2	5:00
	Akira Okada	vs.	Munehiro Kin	Draw	2	5:00
	Tadaaki Yamamoto	def.	Jun Nabeshima	Submission (Rear-Naked Choke)	2	3:20

== Shooto: Gig Tokyo 5 ==
Shooto: Gig Tokyo 5 was an event held on August 7, 2010 at Shinjuku Face in Tokyo, Japan.

=== Results ===
Main Card
Weight class				Method	Round	Time	Notes
	Yoichiro Sato	def.	Takasuke Kume	Decision (Unanimous)	3	5:00
	Daiji Takahashi	def.	Yusei Shimokawa	Decision (Unanimous)	3	5:00
	Guy Delumeau	vs.	Wataru Miki	Draw	2	5:00
	Masato Sannai	def.	Naohiro Mizuno	Submission (Armbar)	1	3:56
	Akihiro Murayama	def.	Jung Min Kang	Submission (Rear-Naked Choke)	3	3:31
	Jun-Hee Moon	def.	Takahiro Suzuki	TKO (Punches)	2	2:45
	Tetsuo Seto	def.	Seong Hak Jin	Decision (Unanimous)	2	5:00
	Kyoji Horiguchi	def.	Keita Ishibashi	TKO (Doctor Stoppage)	1	2:23
	Akinobu Watanabe	def.	Yosuke Ebihara	Submission (Rear-Naked Choke)	1	4:03

== Shooto: Border: Season 2: Rhythm ==
Shooto: Border: Season 2: Rhythm was an event held on August 15, 2010 at Hirano Ward Community Hall in Osaka, Kansai, Japan.

=== Results ===
Main Card
Weight class				Method	Round	Time	Notes
	Junya Kodo	def.	Kentaro Watanabe	Decision (Unanimous)	2	5:00
	Masaki Konishi	def.	Tomokazu Yuasa	Decision (Unanimous)	2	5:00
	Kazuya Satomoto	def.	Hiroshi Shiba	TKO (Punches)	1	2:00
	Tsuneo Kimura	def.	Shinji Maeguchi	Decision (Majority)	2	5:00
	Ryuichiro Sumimura	def.	Naoji Mikoshiba	Decision (Unanimous)	2	5:00
	Kota Shimoishi	def.	Yoshinori Takahashi	Submission (Guillotine Choke)	1	3:18
	Bunpei Umezono	def.	Norio Tokuhisa	Submission (Guillotine Choke)	1	1:29
	Masanobu Mori	vs.	Masayoshi Kato	Draw	2	5:00

== Shooto: Gig North 6 ==
Shooto: Gig North 6 was an event held on August 29, 2010 at Zepp Sapporo in Sapporo, Hokkaido, Japan.

=== Results ===
Main Card
Weight class				Method	Round	Time	Notes
	Fumihiro Kitahara	def.	Hiroyuki Tanaka	Submission (Rear-Naked Choke)	2	4:35
	Bae Yong Kwon	def.	Daisuke Ishizawa	KO (Punch)	1	3:24
	Hidekazu Asakura	def.	Jun Ho Kim	Submission (Kimura)	2	0:58
	Isao Yoshida	vs.	Shin Hyuk Kang	Draw	2	5:00
	Toshiaki Hayasaka	def.	Atsushi Kobayashi	Submission (Rear-Naked Choke)	1	2:15
	Tomokazu Sato	def.	Atsushi Mochizuki	Decision (Unanimous)	2	5:00
	Tatsuya Yamamoto	def.	Kenya Kato	Decision (Unanimous)	2	5:00

== Shooto: Kitazawa Shooto Vol. 4 ==
Shooto: Kitazawa Shooto Vol. 4 was an event held on September 17, 2010 at Kitazawa Town Hall in Tokyo, Japan.

=== Results ===
Main Card
Weight class				Method	Round	Time	Notes
	Yusei Shimokawa	def.	Yusuke Sato	Decision (Unanimous)	2	5:00
	Paolo Milano	def.	Jin Kazeta	Decision (Majority)	2	5:00
	Kenichi Sawada	def.	Jun Nabeshima	TKO (Doctor Stoppage)	2	1:24
	Koji Nishioka	def.	Masato Fujiwara	Decision (Majority)	2	5:00
	Yuta Sasaki	def.	Motohiro Takenawa	Decision (Unanimous)	2	5:00
	Yasutaka Ishigami	def.	Yoshiyuki Takano	Decision (Unanimous)	2	5:00
	Hiroyuki Shida	def.	Shuichiro Okumura	TKO (Corner Stoppage)	1	3:43
	Fumihiko Kawamura	def.	Yoshikazu Fujiishi	Decision (Unanimous)	2	5:00

== Shooto: The Way of Shooto 5: Like a Tiger, Like a Dragon ==
Shooto: The Way of Shooto 5: Like a Tiger, Like a Dragon was an event held on September 23, 2010 at Korakuen Hall in Tokyo, Japan.

=== Results ===
Main Card
Weight class				Method	Round	Time	Notes
	Darren Uyenoyama	def.	Shuichiro Katsumura	TKO (Punches)	2	3:53
	Junji Ito	def.	Jesse Taitano	TKO (Punches)	3	4:50
	Hiromasa Ougikubo	def.	So Tazawa	Decision (Unanimous)	3	5:00
	Yusuke Yachi	def.	Jin Hyun Kim	Decision (Unanimous)	2	5:00
	Masaki Yanagisawa	def.	Hyo Ryeong Kim	Submission (Heel Hook)	1	0:53
	Hiroshi Osato	def.	Masumi Tozawa	Decision (Majority)	2	5:00
	Akira Okada	def.	Yoshinori Suzuki	Decision (Unanimous)	2	5:00
	Yo Saito	def.	Yoshifumi Nakamura	Decision (Majority)	2	5:00

== Shooto: Gig West 12 ==
Shooto: Gig West 12 was an event held on September 26, 2010 at Abeno Ward Hall in Osaka, Kansai, Japan.

=== Results ===
Main Card
Weight class				Method	Round	Time	Notes
	Shinji Sasaki	def.	Takumi Nakayama	TKO (Punches)	1	3:51
	Junji Ikoma	vs.	Atsushi Takeuchi	Draw	3	5:00
	Tatsunori Tanaka	def.	Yoshifumi Dogaki	Submission (Rear-Naked Choke)	1	4:22
	Nobuhiro Hayakawa	def.	Yasuaki Nagamoto	Decision (Unanimous)	2	5:00
	Kota Shimoishi	def.	Bunpei Umezono	Decision (Unanimous)	2	5:00
	Tadaaki Yamamoto	def.	Koji Kishimoto	TKO (Punches)	1	2:27
	Masayoshi Kato	def.	Tomokazu Sato	Submission (Triangle Choke)	2	2:27
	Takuya Kodama	def.	Yutaka Kimura	Decision (Majority)	2	5:00

== Shooto: Shooting Disco 13: Can't Stop Myself! ==
Shooto: Shooting Disco 13: Can't Stop Myself! was an event held on October 16, 2010 at Shinjuku Face in Tokyo, Japan.

=== Results ===
Main Card
Weight class				Method	Round	Time	Notes
	Masaaki Sugawara	def.	Ayumu Shioda	KO (Knee and Punches)	3	0:14
	Yusuke Honma	def.	Yuki Yasunaga	Submission (Triangle Choke)	1	4:11
	Takahiro Hosoi	def.	Keita Kono	KO (Knee and Punches)	1	3:14
	Takayuki Hirose	def.	Satoshi Inaba	Decision (Unanimous)	2	5:00
	Daiki Takashima	def.	Kenichiro Marui	Decision (Unanimous)	2	5:00
	Shinichi Hanawa	def.	Akinobu Watanabe	Decision (Unanimous)	2	5:00
	Yusuke Kasuya	def.	Daisuke Sasaki	Submission (Rear-Naked Choke)	1	4:02
	Michinori Tanaka	def.	Yasutaka Hamaji	Decision (Unanimous)	2	5:00
	Itsuki Hiruma	def.	Takafumi Ato	Decision (Unanimous)	2	5:00
	Yohei Ota	vs.	Jin Suzuki	Draw	2	5:00

== Shooto: Gig Central 21 ==
Shooto: Gig Central 21 was an event held on October 24, 2010 at Asunal Kanayama Hall in Nagoya, Aichi, Japan.

=== Results ===
Main Card
Weight class				Method	Round	Time	Notes
	Daisuke Sugie	def.	Shin Kochiwa	Decision (Unanimous)	2	5:00
	Ichaku Murata	def.	Hidetaka Naka	Submission (Guillotine Choke)	2	3:53
	Teppei Masuda	def.	Keisuke Kurata	Submission (Rear-Naked Choke)	1	2:19
	Makoto Maeda	vs.	Yoshiaki Masuda	Draw	2	5:00
	Kenya Kato	vs.	Masanobu Mori	Draw	2	5:00
	Takayoshi Ono	vs.	Shinji Maeguchi	Draw	2	5:00
	Kosuke Suzuki	def.	Shinobu Aoyama	KO (Punches)	1	1:57
	Seiji Akao	def.	Shoki Omichi	Decision (Unanimous)	2	5:00

== Shooto: The Way of Shooto 6: Like a Tiger, Like a Dragon ==
Shooto: The Way of Shooto 6: Like a Tiger, Like a Dragon was an event held on November 19, 2010 at Korakuen Hall in Tokyo, Japan.

=== Results ===
Main Card
Weight class				Method	Round	Time	Notes
	Taiki Tsuchiya	def.	Gustavo Falciroli	Decision (Unanimous)	3	5:00
	Mamoru Yamaguchi	def.	Fumihiro Kitahara	KO (Head Kick)	1	2:33
	Yasuhiro Urushitani	def.	Takuya Mori	TKO (Punches)	1	4:49
	Tenkei Oda	def.	Bae Yong Kwon	TKO (Punches)	1	1:03
	Adam Lynn	def.	Yoshihiro Koyama	Decision (Unanimous)	3	5:00
	Mikihito Yamagami	def.	Shinya Murofushi	Decision (Majority)	2	5:00
	Haruo Ochi	def.	Hiroaki Ijima	Decision (Unanimous)	2	5:00
	Yuta Nezu	def.	Kota Onojima	Decision (Majority)	2	5:00
	Kenji Yamamoto	def.	Toshiaki Hayasaka	TKO (Doctor Stoppage)	1	1:28

== Shooto: The Rookie Tournament 2010 Final ==
Shooto: The Rookie Tournament 2010 Final was an event held on December 18, 2010 at Shinjuku Face in Tokyo, Japan.

=== Results ===
Main Card
Weight class				Method	Round	Time	Notes
	Hideki Kadowaki	def.	Yusuke Yachi	Decision (Unanimous)	2	5:00
	Junji Ito	def.	Atsushi Takeuchi	KO (Punch)	1	3:58
	Tetsu Suzuki	def.	Masato Sannai	Decision (Majority)	3	5:00
	Hiroshige Tanaka	def.	Masaki Yanagisawa	Decision (Unanimous)	2	5:00
	Yuta Sasaki	def.	Yo Saito	Decision (Unanimous)	2	5:00
	Kyoji Horiguchi	def.	Seiji Akao	TKO (Punches)	2	0:43
	Kosuke Suzuki	def.	Yusuke Honma	KO (Punches)	1	4:52
	Kota Shimoishi	def.	Akira Okada	Submission (Rear-Naked Choke)	3	1:24
	Yusaku Inoue	def.	Ryuichiro Sumimura	Decision (Unanimous)	3	5:00
	Masayoshi Kato	def.	Tadaaki Yamamoto	Decision (Split)	2	5:00

== Shooto: Border: Season 2: Immovable ==
Shooto: Border: Season 2: Immovable was an event held on December 26, 2010 at Hirano Ward Community Hall in Osaka, Kansai, Japan.

=== Results ===
Main Card
Weight class				Method	Round	Time	Notes
	Junji Ikoma	def.	Teppei Masuda	Submission (Triangle Choke)	1	2:12
	Takumi Nakayama	def.	Tsuneo Kimura	Decision (Unanimous)	2	5:00
	Taro Kusano	vs.	Hiroshi Shiba	Draw	2	5:00
	Taiki Hamasaki	def.	Motohiro Takenawa	Submission (Armbar)	1	3:57
	Akihito Sasao	def.	Toshio Mitani	Submission (Armbar)	2	2:36
	Tomoya Suzuki	def.	Tatsuhiko Hirase	Decision (Unanimous)	2	5:00
	Masahiro Yokoyama	def.	Koki Ota	Submission (Armbar)	2	4:07
	Naritoshi Kakuta	def.	Yuki Kosaka	Decision (Majority)	2	5:00

== See also ==
- Shooto
- List of Shooto champions
- List of Shooto Events
