= Junji Ito (fighter) =

Japanese mixed martial artist (born 1986)

- Born: August 23, 1986 (age 40); Yokohama, Kanagawa, Japan
- Native name: 伊藤 淳二
- Other names: Junji Sarumaru (猿丸ジュンジ)
- Nationality: Japanese
- Height: 5 ft 4 in (1.63 m)
- Weight: 114 lb (52 kg)
- Division: Strawweight
- Stance: Orthodox
- Team: Shooting Gym Yokohama

Mixed martial arts record
- Total: 31
- Wins: 20
- By knockout: 11
- By submission: 2
- By decision: 7
- Losses: 9
- By knockout: 3
- By submission: 3
- By decision: 3
- Draws: 2

Other information
- Mixed martial arts record from Sherdog

Junji Ito (Japanese: 伊藤淳二, Hepburn: Itō Junji; born August 23, 1986) is a retired Japanese mixed martial artist who competed in the flyweight (114 lbs) division. He is a four-time Shooto World Flyweight (114lbs) Championship title challenger and the former Shooto Flyweight (114 lbs) champion. He's recognized as the seventh greatest strawweight in the history of the sport by Fight Matrix.

== Mixed martial arts career ==
=== Early career ===
Ito made his professional debut against Takahisa Toyoshima at Shooto: Back To Our Roots 4 on July 15, 2007, and won by a 53-second technical knockout. He amassed an 8-2 record over the next three years, during which he finished as a runner-up in the 2008 Shooto Rookie Tournament.

=== Shooto ===
==== Consecutive title fights ====
Ito was scheduled to fight Junji Ikoma for the vacant Shooto World Flyweight Championship at Shooto: Shooto Tradition 2011 on April 29, 2011. Ito was at the time the #1 ranked flyweight contender in the Shooto rankings, while Ikoma came in as the #4 ranked flyweight contender. Ikoma won the fight by unanimous decision, with all three judges awarding him a 29-28 scorecard.

Ito was scheduled to face the #8 ranked Shooto flyweight contender Yuki Shoujou in the co-main event of Shooto: 3rd Round on March 10, 2012. He won the fight by majority decision.

Ito was scheduled to challenge for the Shooto World Flyweight Championship, for the second time in his career, against Mikihito Yamagami at Shooto: 10th Round on September 30, 2012. He lost the fight by a second-round technical submission, losing consciousness due to a rear-naked choke at the 1:36 minute mark.

Ito was scheduled to face Tadaaki Yamamoto at Shooto: Gig Tokyo 15 on August 25, 2013. He won the fight by unanimous decision.

Ito made his third career Shooto World Flyweight title challenge against Shinya Murofushi at Shooto: 1st Round 2014 on January 13, 2014. He lost the fight by a first-round technical submission. Murofushi managed to take Ito down, take his back and lock in a figure four lock, before choking him unconscious with an RNC at the 3:33 minute mark.

==== Fourth Shooto title run ====
Ito was scheduled to face Hiroaki Shishino at Shooto: 7th Round 2014 on September 27, 2014. He won the fight by a first-round knockout.

Ito was scheduled to face the 33-fight veteran Kenichi Sawada at Shooto: Gig Tokyo 18 on February 11, 2015. He won the fight by a second-round knockout.

Ito was scheduled to face the undefeated Ryohei Kurosawa at Shooto: Mobstyles 15th Anniversary Tour Fight & Mosh on May 3, 2015. He won the fight by a second-round knockout.

Ito was scheduled to challenge Yoshitaka Naito for the Shooto World Flyweight title at Shooto - Professional Shooto 11/29 on November 29, 2015. He lost the fight by unanimous decision.

==== Fifth Shooto title run ====
Ito had his first overseas fight at World Series of Fighting Global Championship: Japan 1 on February 7, 2016, when he was scheduled to face Jarred Brooks. Brooks won the fight by a second-round knockout.

Ito then returned to the Japanese circuit, and was scheduled to face Takahiro Kohori at Shooto - Professional Shooto 11/12 on November 12, 2016. He won the fight by a first-round technical knockout.

Ito fought the future Shooto Flyweight champion Yosuke Saruta at Shooto - Professional Shooto 1/29 on January 29, 2017. The fight was ruled a majority draw.

Ito was scheduled to fight Itchaku Murata at Shooto - Professional Shooto 1/28 on January 28, 2018. He lost the fight by a first-round knockout.

Ito was scheduled to fight Mijikai Nagai at Shooto - Professional Shooto 5/13 on May 13, 2018. He won the fight by unanimous decision.

Ito was scheduled to face Ryosuke Honda at Shooto - Professional Shooto 11/17 on November 17, 2018. He won the fight by a second-round technical decision, as Ito was unable to continue fighting following a low blow 17 seconds into the round.

Ito was scheduled to face Michael Nakagawa at Shooto - 30th Anniversary Tour 7th Round on September 22, 2019. The fight was ruled a split draw.

Ito was scheduled to fight Jerome Wanawan at Shooto 2020 in Korakuen Hall on January 26, 2020. He won the fight by unanimous decision.

Ito was scheduled to face Tateo Iino at Professional Shooto 2020 Vol. 6 on September 19, 2020. He won the fight by a first-round technical knockout, stopping Iino with six seconds left in the round.

==== Shooto Flyweight champion ====
Ito was booked to face Ryohei Kurosawa for the interim Shooto Flyweight Championship at Professional Shooto 2021 vol. 7 on November 7, 2021. Ito and Kurosawa previously fought on May 3, 2015, when Ito handed Kurosawa his sole professional loss. Ito won the rematch by a first-round submission.

On August 1, 2022, it was announced that the previous Shooto flyweight champion Hiroba Minowa had vacated the title. As such, Ito was promoted to undisputed champion status. Ito faced Jo Arai in his first title defense at Professional Shooto 2022 vol. 6 on September 19, 2022. He lost the fight by a first-round knockout.

On December 2, 2023, Ito faced Shuto Aki on December 2, 2023 at Shooto: Mobstyles, winning the bout via TKO stoppage in the first round and declaring his retirement after the bout.

== Championships and accomplishments ==
- Shooto
  - Shooto Flyweight (114 lbs) Championship
  - Interim Shooto Flyweight (114 lbs) Championship
  - 2008 Shooto Rookie Tournament Runner-up

== Mixed martial arts record ==
Professional record breakdown
31 matches	20 wins	9 losses
By knockout	11	3
By submission	2	3
By decision	7	3
Draws	2	

Res.	Record	Opponent	Method	Event	Date	Round	Time	Location	Notes
Win	20–8–2	Shuto Aki	TKO (punches)	Shooto : MOBSTYLES presents FIGHT&MOSH	December 2, 2023	1	1:18	Tokyo, Japan	Return to Flyweight.
Loss	19–9–2	Jo Arai	TKO (punch)	Shooto 2022 Vol.6	September 19, 2022	1	1:50	Tokyo, Japan	Lost the Shooto Flyweight (114 lbs) Championship.
Win	19–8–2	Ryohei Kurosawa	Submission (rear-naked choke)	Shooto 2021 Vol.7	November 7, 2021	1	3:23	Tokyo, Japan	Won the interim Shooto Flyweight (114 lbs) Championship.
Win	18–8–2	Tateo Iino	TKO (punches)	Shooto 2020 Vol. 6	September 19, 2020	1	4:54	Tokyo, Japan	Flyweight bout.
Win	17–8–2	Jerome Wanawan	Decision (unanimous)	Shooto 2020 in Korakuen Hall	January 26, 2020	3	5:00	Tokyo, Japan	
Draw	16–8–2	Michael Nakagawa	Draw (split)	Shooto - 30th Anniversary Tour 7th Round	September 22, 2019	3	5:00	Tokyo, Japan	
Loss	16–8–1	Ryosuke Honda	Technical Decision (unanimous)	Shooto - Professional Shooto 11/17	November 17, 2018	2	0:17	Tokyo, Japan	
Loss	15–8–1	Mijikai Nagai	Decision (unanimous)	Shooto - Professional Shooto 5/13	May 13, 2018	2	5:00	Tokyo, Japan	
Loss	15–7–1	Itchaku Murata	KO (punch)	Shooto - Professional Shooto 1/28	January 28, 2018	1	0:53	Tokyo, Japan	
Draw	14–7–1	Yosuke Saruta	Draw (majority)	Shooto - Professional Shooto 1/29	January 29, 2017	3	5:00	Tokyo, Japan	
Win	14–7	Takahiro Kohori	TKO (punches)	Shooto - Professional Shooto 11/12	November 12, 2016	1	2:07	Tokyo, Japan	
Loss	13–7	Jarred Brooks	KO (elbows)	World Series of Fighting Global Championship: Japan 1	February 7, 2016	2	3:29	Tokyo, Japan	
Loss	13–6	Yoshitaka Naito	Decision (unanimous)	Shooto - Professional Shooto 11/29	November 29, 2015	5	5:00	Tokyo, Japan	For the Shooto World Flyweight (114lbs) Championship.
Win	13–5	Ryohei Kurosawa	KO (punch)	Shooto: Mobstyles 15th Anniversary Tour Fight & Mosh	May 3, 2015	1	2:00	Tokyo, Japan	
Win	12–5	Kenichi Sawada	KO (punches)	Shooto: Gig Tokyo 18	February 11, 2015	2	2:04	Tokyo, Japan	
Win	11–5	Hiroaki Shishino	KO (punches)	Shooto: 7th Round 2014	September 27, 2014	1	1:52	Tokyo, Japan	
Loss	10–5	Shinya Murofushi	Technical Submission (rear-naked choke)	Shooto: 1st Round 2014	January 13, 2014	1	3:33	Tokyo, Japan	For the Shooto World Flyweight (114lbs) Championship.
Win	10–4	Tadaaki Yamamoto	Decision (unanimous)	Shooto: Gig Tokyo 15	August 25, 2013	3	5:00	Tokyo, Japan	
Loss	9–4	Mikihito Yamagami	Technical Submission (rear-naked choke)	Shooto: 10th Round	September 30, 2012	2	1:36	Tokyo, Japan	For the Shooto World Flyweight (114lbs) Championship.
Win	9–3	Yuki Shoujou	Decision (majority)	Shooto: 3rd Round	March 10, 2012	3	5:00	Tokyo, Japan	
Loss	8–3	Junji Ikoma	Decision (unanimous)	Shooto: Shooto Tradition 2011	April 29, 2011	3	5:00	Tokyo, Japan	For the vacant Shooto World Flyweight (114lbs) Championship.
Win	8–2	Atsushi Takeuchi	KO (punch)	Shooto: The Rookie Tournament 2010 Final	December 18, 2010	1	3:58	Tokyo, Japan	
Win	7–2	Jesse Taitano	TKO (punches)	Shooto: The Way of Shooto 5: Like a Tiger, Like a Dragon	September 23, 2010	3	4:50	Tokyo, Japan	
Win	6–2	Hiroaki Yoshioka	Decision (unanimous)	Shooto: Shooting Disco 11: Tora Tora Tora!	February 27, 2010	3	5:00	Tokyo, Japan	
Win	5–2	Takeshi Sato	Decision (unanimous)	Shooto: The Rookie Tournament 2009 Final	December 13, 2009	2	5:00	Tokyo, Japan	
Win	4–2	Kenichi Sawada	Submission (rear-naked choke)	Shooto: Gig Tokyo 2	April 19, 2009	2	0:47	Tokyo, Japan	
Loss	3–2	Mikihito Yamagami	Submission (guillotine choke)	Shooto: The Rookie Tournament 2008 Final	December 13, 2008	2	2:15	Tokyo, Japan	Shooto Rookie Tournament Final.
Win	3–1	Yoshitaka Aki	TKO (punches)	Shooto: Shooto Tradition 3	September 28, 2008	1	4:01	Tokyo, Japan	Shooto Rookie Tournament Semifinal.
Win	2–1	Kazuyuki Yoshida	TKO (punches)	Shooto: Back To Our Roots 7	January 26, 2008	1	1:52	Tokyo, Japan	Shooto Rookie Tournament Quarterfinal.
Loss	1–1	Noboru Tahara	Decision (unanimous)	Shooto: Shooting Disco 3: Everybody Fight Now	October 20, 2007	2	5:00	Tokyo, Japan	
Win	1–0	Takahisa Toyoshima	TKO (punches)	Shooto: Back To Our Roots 4	July 15, 2007	1	0:53	Tokyo, Japan	Strawweight debut.

== See also ==
- List of Shooto champions
- List of male mixed martial artists
