= Yosuke Saruta =

Japanese mixed martial arts fighter

- Born: Yosuke Saruta; July 8, 1987 (age 39); Kawaguchi, Saitama, Japan
- Native name: 猿田洋祐
- Nickname: Tobizaru No. 2
- Nationality: Japanese
- Height: 160 cm (5 ft 3 in)
- Weight: 57 kg (125.7 lb; 9.0 st)
- Division: Flyweight (2008–2016, 2018-present); Strawweight (2016–2018)
- Stance: Orthodox
- Fighting out of: Tokyo, Japan
- Team: Reversal Gym Kawaguchi REDIPS (2008–2014); Wajutsu Keishukai Hearts (2014–present)
- Rank: Brown belt in Brazilian jiu-jitsu
- Years active: 2008–present

Mixed martial arts record
- Total: 38
- Wins: 21
- By knockout: 6
- By submission: 2
- By decision: 13
- Losses: 14
- By knockout: 8
- By decision: 6
- Draws: 3

Other information
- Mixed martial arts record from Sherdog

Yosuke Saruta (Japanese: 猿田 洋祐, Saruta Yōsuke; born July 8, 1987) is a Japanese mixed martial artist who last competed in the strawweight division of ONE Championship.

A professional competitor since 2008, he is the former ONE Strawweight Champion and former Shooto World Flyweight (114lbs) Champion.

== Personal life ==
Saruta was born in Kawaguchi, Saitama, Japan. Saruta was active in extracurricular activities in his youth, and had a focus on gymnastics. He wanted to become an Olympic athlete for his country. When he was 18, Saruta saw Norifumi Yamamoto on television and decided to begin training in mixed martial arts.

He is married.

== Mixed martial arts career ==
=== Shooto ===
Saruta made his professional MMA debut on January 26, 2008 at Shooto: Back to Our Roots 7 against Kota Funaki. He would lose the bout by TKO.

On August 9, 2009, Saruta got his first professional victory over Takahiro Kohori at Shooto: Gig Saitama 1 by first-round TKO.

Between August 2011 and April 2013, Saruta had his first-ever winning streak. He won five consecutive bouts in Shooto with two submissions and a knockout during the run. During this run, he won the Shooto Infinity Bantamweight tournament, with a majority decision win over Masumi Tozawa. This would earn him a title shot versus Ryuichi Miki. Their first bout ended in a draw, and their second in a unanimous decision loss for Saruta. After early failed attempts at winning Shooto titles, Saruta moved to Tokyo and changed camps to begin training with Wajutsu Keishukai Hearts.

After an up-and-down stretch that saw Saruta go 3-4-1, the Japanese fighter began another five-match unbeaten streak that would lead to a flyweight title shot against Ryuto Sawada. On October 15, 2017, Saruta defeated Sawada by knockout in the fourth round to capture the Shooto flyweight championship. Following that, he achieved a decision win over Kiyotaka Shimizu and defended his title against Itchaku Murata, winning by way of TKO.

=== ONE Championship ===
On December 7, 2018, Saruta made his ONE Championship debut against former strawweight champion, Alex Silva. He won by unanimous decision.

The victory in his ONE Championship debut earned Saruta a title shot against Joshua Pacio. On January 19, 2019, Saruta edged out Pacio by split decision to win the ONE strawweight world championship.

Yosuke Saruta would fight a rematch with Joshua Pacio at ONE: Roots of Honor. Saruta lost the bout, after being knocked out by a knee in the fourth round.

At ONE Century, Saruta bounced back with a KO victory over the Pancrase strawweight champion Daichi Kitakata, stopping his opponent in the first minute of the second round.

Saruta next faced Yoshitaka Naito at Road to One 3: Tokyo Fight Night on September 10, 2020. He won the fight via unanimous decision.

Saruta faced Joshua Pacio in a trilogy match for the ONE Strawweight Championship at ONE Championship: Revolution on September 24, 2021. He lost the bout via TKO in the first round.

Saruta was expected to face Gustavo Balart at ONE: Bad Blood on February 11, 2022. Saruta withdrew from the bout, after testing positive for COVID-19 on the day of the event. The fight was rescheduled for ONE 156 on April 22, 2022. Saruta lost the fight by unanimous decision.

Returning off an almost 2 year layoff, Saruta faced Mansur Malachiev on February 17, 2024 at ONE Fight Night 19, losing the fight via unanimous decision.

Saruta faced Keito Yamakita on August 3, 2024, at ONE Fight Night 24. He lost the fight via split decision.

== Championships and accomplishments ==
- ONE Championship
  - ONE Strawweight Championship (One time; former)
- Shooto
  - Shooto World Flyweight (114lbs) Championship (One time)
    - One successful title defense
  - 2012 Infinity Bantamweight Tournament
  - 2018 Fighter of the Year
- eFight.jp
  - Fighter of the Month for January 2019
  - Fighter of the Month for October 2019

== Mixed martial arts record ==
Professional record breakdown
38 matches	21 wins	14 losses
By knockout	6	8
By submission	2	0
By decision	13	6
Draws	3	

Res.	Record	Opponent	Method	Event	Date	Round	Time	Location	Notes
Loss	21–14–3	Fábio Henrique	TKO (arm injury)	ONE Fight Night 43	May 16, 2026	2	0:39	Bangkok, Thailand	
Loss	21–13–3	Keito Yamakita	Decision (split)	ONE Fight Night 24	August 3, 2024	3	5:00	Bangkok, Thailand	
Loss	21–12–3	Mansur Malachiev	Decision (unanimous)	ONE Fight Night 19	February 17, 2024	3	5:00	Bangkok, Thailand	
Loss	21–11–3	Gustavo Balart	Decision (unanimous)	ONE 156	April 22, 2022	3	5:00	Kallang, Singapore	
Loss	21–10–3	Joshua Pacio	TKO (punches)	ONE: Revolution	September 24, 2021	1	3:38	Kallang, Singapore	For the ONE Strawweight Championship (125 lb).
Win	21–9–3	Yoshitaka Naito	Decision (unanimous)	Road to ONE: Tokyo Fight Night 3	September 10, 2020	3	5:00	Tokyo, Japan	
Win	20–9–3	Daichi Kitakata	KO (punches)	ONE: Century – Part 2	October 13, 2019	2	0:59	Tokyo, Japan	
Loss	19–9–3	Joshua Pacio	KO (head kick)	ONE: Roots of Honor	April 12, 2019	4	2:43	Pasay, Philippines	Lost the ONE Strawweight Championship (125 lb).
Win	19–8–3	Joshua Pacio	Decision (split)	ONE: Eternal Glory	January 19, 2019	5	5:00	Jakarta, Indonesia	Won the ONE Strawweight Championship (125 lb).
Win	18–8–3	Alex Silva	Decision (unanimous)	ONE: Destiny of Champions	December 7, 2018	3	5:00	Kuala Lumpur, Malaysia	
Loss	17–8–3	Takumi Tamaru	TKO (doctor stoppage)	Professional Shooto 7/15	July 15, 2018	3	3:49	Tokyo, Japan	Return to Flyweight.
Win	17–7–3	Itchaku Murata	KO (punches)	Professional Shooto 5/13	May 13, 2018	3	0:45	Kanagawa, Japan	Defended the Shooto Flyweight Championship.
Win	16–7–3	Kiyotaka Shimizu	Decision (unanimous)	Professional Shooto 1/28	January 28, 2018	3	5:00	Tokyo, Japan	
Win	15–7–3	Ryuto Sawada	KO (punches)	Professional Shooto 10/15	October 15, 2017	4	2:37	Chiba, Japan	Won the Shooto Flyweight Championship.
Win	14–7–3	Koha Minowa	Decision (unanimous)	Professional Shooto 4/23	April 23, 2017	3	5:00	Chiba, Japan	
Draw	13–7–3	Junji Ito	Draw (majority)	Professional Shooto 1/29	January 29, 2017	3	5:00	Tokyo, Japan	
Win	13–7–2	Luis Gonzalez	Decision (unanimous)	Professional Shooto 7/17	July 17, 2016	3	5:00	Tokyo, Japan	
Win	12–7–2	Teppei Maeyama	Decision (unanimous)	Professional Shooto 3/21	March 21, 2016	2	5:00	Tokyo, Japan	
Win	11–7–2	Hiroshi Roppongi	KO (punch)	Professional Shooto 1/11	January 11, 2016	2	0:18	Tokyo, Japan	Strawweight debut.
Loss	10–7–2	Hiromasa Ougikubo	Decision (unanimous)	Professional Shooto 11/29	November 29, 2015	3	5:00	Tokyo, Japan	
Win	10–6–2	Taku Kajikawa	Decision (unanimous)	Professional Shooto 7/26	July 26, 2015	3	5:00	Tokyo, Japan	
Loss	9–6–2	Hayato Suzuki	Decision (unanimous)	Grandslam MMA 2: Way of the Cage	February 8, 2015	3	5:00	Tokyo, Japan	
Loss	9–5–2	Mamoru Yamaguchi	TKO (doctor stoppage)	VTJ 6th	October 4, 2014	2	0:25	Tokyo, Japan	
Win	9–4–2	Shunichi Shimizu	Decision (unanimous)	Grandslam MMA 1: Way of the Cage	July 13, 2014	3	5:00	Tokyo, Japan	
Win	8–4–2	Masaaki Sugawara	Decision (majority)	Shooto: Gig Tokyo 16	April 20, 2014	3	5:00	Tokyo, Japan	
Loss	7–4–2	Ryuichi Miki	Decision (unanimous)	Shooto: 5th Round 2013	November 9, 2013	5	5:00	Tokyo, Japan	For the Shooto Bantamweight Championship.
Draw	7–3–2	Ryuichi Miki	Draw (split)	Shooto: 3rd Round 2013	July 27, 2013	5	5:00	Tokyo, Japan	For the Shooto Bantamweight Championship.
Win	7–3–1	Kentaro Watanabe	KO (punches)	Shooto: Border: Season 5 - First	April 7, 2013	1	3:52	Osaka, Japan	
Win	6–3–1	Masumi Tozawa	Decision (majority)	Shooto: The Rookie Tournament Final 2012	December 15, 2012	3	5:00	Tokyo, Japan	
Win	5–3–1	Yuki Nishigo	Technical Submission (guillotine choke)	Shooto: Gig Tokyo 11	August 25, 2012	1	3:26	Tokyo, Japan	
Win	4–3–1	Hiroshi Osato	Decision (unanimous)	Shooto: Gig Tokyo 9	April 14, 2012	2	5:00	Tokyo, Japan	
Win	3–3–1	Akinobu Watanabe	Submission (rear-naked choke)	Shooto: Gig Tokyo 7	August 6, 2011	1	1:00	Tokyo, Japan	
Loss	2–3–1	Tatsuya Nakashima	TKO (arm injury)	Shooto: Shooting Disco 11: Tora Tora Tora!	February 27, 2010	1	1:54	Tokyo, Japan	
Draw	2–2–1	Nozumi Otsuka	Draw (split)	Shooto: The Rookie Tournament 2009 Final	December 13, 2009	3	5:00	Tokyo, Japan	
Win	2–2	Jun Nagasoe	Decision (unanimous)	Shooto: Gig Tokyo 3	October 18, 2009	2	5:00	Tokyo, Japan	
Win	1–2	Takahiro Kohori	TKO (punches)	Shooto: Gig Saitama 1	August 9, 2009	1	3:06	Fujimi, Japan	
Loss	0–2	Nozomi Otsuka	TKO (corner stoppage)	Shooto - Shooting Disco 5: Earth, Wind and Fighter	June 21, 2008	2	3:25	Tokyo, Japan	
Loss	0–1	Kota Funaki	TKO (towel, punches)	Shooto: Back to Our Roots 7	January 26, 2008	2	2:22	Tokyo, Japan	Flyweight debut.

== See also ==
- List of male mixed martial artists
- List of Shooto champions
- List of ONE Championship champions
