= ONE Fight Night 28 =

Combat sport events in 2025

ONE Fight Night 28: Prajanchai vs. Barboza
- The poster for ONE Fight Night 28: Prajanchai vs. Barboza
- Promotion: ONE Championship
- Date: February 8, 2025
- Venue: Lumpinee Boxing Stadium
- City: Bangkok, Thailand

Event chronology
ONE Friday Fights 96: Komawut vs. Panrit 2	ONE Fight Night 28: Prajanchai vs. Barboza	ONE Friday Fights 97: Kongsuk vs. Lamnamoonlek

ONE Fight Night 28: Prajanchai vs. Barboza was a combat sports event produced by ONE Championship that took place on February 8, 2025, at Lumpinee Boxing Stadium in Bangkok, Thailand.

== Background ==
A ONE Strawweight Muay Thai World Championship bout between current champion (also a current ONE Strawweight Kickboxing World Champion) Prajanchai P.K.Saenchai and Ellis Badr Barboza headlined the event.

A featherweight submission grappling match between Gianni Grippo and Gabriel Sousa took place at the event.

A bantamweight bout between Jeremy Pacatiw and Ibrahim Dauev was removed from the event after failed five attempts at passing a hydration test with Dauev and Pacatiw decided against accepting a catchweight.

== Results ==
Fight card (Amazon Prime Video)
Weight class				Method	Round	Time	Notes
Strawweight Muay Thai	Prajanchai P.K.Saenchai (c)	def.	Ellis Badr Barboza	TKO (doctor stoppage)	4	1:55	(Note: For the ONE Strawweight Muay Thai World Championship.)
Flyweight Muay Thai	Kongthoranee Sor.Sommai	def.	Nong-O Hama	Decision (split)	3	3:00
Catchweight (178.5 lb)	Zhang Lipeng	def.	Hiroyuki Tetsuka	KO (punches)	1	2:06
Flyweight Muay Thai	Sean Climaco	def.	Diego Paez	Decision (split)	3	3:00
Strawweight	Keito Yamakita	def.	Lito Adiwang	Decision (unanimous)	3	5:00
Bantamweight Muay Thai	Felipe Lobo	def.	Saemapetch Fairtex	TKO (punches)	3	2:22
Flyweight	Jeremy Miado	def.	Gilbert Nakatani	Decision (unanimous)	3	5:00
Bantamweight	Carlo Bumina-ang	def.	Song Min-jong	TKO (punches)	1	0:53
Featherweight Submission Grappling	Gabriel Sousa	def.	Gianni Grippo	Decision (split)	1	10:00
Catchweight (127.5 lb) Muay Thai	Aliff Sor.Dechapan	def.	Shamil Adukhov	KO (punch)	1	1:10

== Bonus awards ==
The following fighters received bonuses:

- Performance of the Night ($100,000): Prajanchai P.K.Saenchai
- Performance of the Night ($50,000): Zhang Lipeng

== See also ==
- 2025 in ONE Championship
- List of ONE Championship events
- List of current ONE fighters
- ONE Championship Rankings
