= Shinya Murofushi =

Japanese martial artist

- Born: July 10, 1983 (age 43); Tagata District, Shizuoka, Japan
- Native name: 室伏伸哉
- Nationality: Japanese
- Height: 5 ft 7 in (1.70 m)
- Weight: 115 lb (52 kg)
- Division: Strawweight
- Stance: Orthodox
- Fighting out of: Shizuoka, Japan
- Team: Submit Shizuoka
- Rank: Purple belt in Brazilian jiu-jitsu
- Years active: 2006-2018

Mixed martial arts record
- Total: 20
- Wins: 13
- By knockout: 1
- By submission: 7
- By decision: 5
- Losses: 6
- By knockout: 2
- By submission: 2
- By decision: 2
- Draws: 1

Other information
- Mixed martial arts record from Sherdog

Shinya Murofushi (Japanese: 室伏伸哉, Murofushi Shinya; born July 10, 1983) is a retired Japanese professional mixed martial artist who competed professionally for Shooto and Pancrase. He is the former Shooto World Flyweight (114 lb) champion. He is regarded by Fight Matrix as one of the best men's strawweight mixed martial artist of all time.

== Martial arts career ==
Murofushi made his professional debut in the semifinals of the 2006 Shooto Rookie of the Year tournament against Hiroyuki Ikeda at Shooto 2006: 10/1 in Kitazawa Town Hall on October 1, 2006. He won the fight by a second-round submission. Murofushi faced Hiroaki Takezawa in the tournament finals at Shooto: Rookie Tournament Final on December 2, 2006. He won the fight by a first-round submission.

Murofushi faced the tenth-ranked Shooto flyweight contender Tatsuya Yamamoto at Shooto: 12th Round on November 11, 2012. He won the fight by a second-round submission.

Murofushi faced Junji Ito for the vacant Shooto World Flyweight (114lbs) Championship at Shooto: 1st Round 2014 on January 13, 2014. He won the fight by first-round technical submission. Murofushi made his first championship defense against the undefeated Yoshitaka Naito in the main event of Shooto: 7th Round 2014 on September 27, 2014. He lost the fight by a fifth-round submission, with just 3 seconds left in the contest.

Murofushi challenged Mitsuhisa Sunabe for the Pancrase Strawweight Championship at Pancrase - 295 on April 15, 2018. He lost the fight by a second-round knockout.

== Championships and Accomplishments ==
=== Mixed martial arts ===
Amateur

- Shooto
  - 2005 Chubu Amateur Shooto Championship Flyweight Tournament Winner
  - 2005 East Japan Amateur Shooto Championship Flyweight Tournament Runner-up
  - 2005 All Japan Amateur Shooto Championships Flyweight Tournament Winner

Professional

- Shooto
  - 2006 Shooto Rookie of the Year Flyweight Tournament Winner
  - Shooto World Flyweight (114 lb) Championship (One time; Former)

=== Grappling ===
- Shooto
  - 2006 All Japan Shooto Grappling Championship Bantamweight Tournament Winner
- Japan Brazilian Jiu Jitsu Federation
  - 5th All Japan Jiu-jitsu Open Tournament Blue Belt Light Featherweight Champion
  - 17th All Japan Jiu-Jitsu Championship Purple Belt Roosterweight Champion
  - 11th All Japan No-Gi Jiu-Jitsu Championship Featherweight Champion

== Mixed martial arts record ==
Professional record breakdown
20 matches	13 wins	6 losses
By knockout	1	2
By submission	7	2
By decision	5	2
Draws	1	

Res.	Record	Opponent	Method	Event	Date	Round	Time	Location	Notes
Loss	13–6–1	Mitsuhisa Sunabe	KO (slam)	Pancrase - 295	April 15, 2018	2	4:11	Tokyo, Japan	For the Pancrase Strawweight Championship.
Win	13–5–1	Seiji Ozuka	Decision (split)	Pancrase - 289	August 20, 2017	3	5:00	Tokyo, Japan	
Win	12–5–1	Rildeci Lima Dias	Submission (triangle armbar)	Pancrase - 280	September 11, 2016	2	4:01	Tokyo, Japan	
Loss	11–5–1	Daichi Kitakata	Decision (unanimous)	Pancrase - 276	March 13, 2016	3	5:00	Tokyo, Japan	
Win	11–4–1	Takuya Eizumi	Decision (unanimous)	Pancrase: 271	November 1, 2015	3	5:00	Tokyo, Japan	
Loss	10–4–1	Yoshitaka Naito	Submission (rear-naked choke)	Shooto: 7th Round 2014	September 27, 2014	5	4:57	Tokyo, Japan	Lost the Shooto World Flyweight (114lbs) Championship.
Win	10–3–1	Junji Ito	Technical Submission (rear-naked choke)	Shooto: 1st Round 2014	January 13, 2014	1	3:33	Tokyo, Japan	Won the vacant Shooto World Flyweight (114lbs) Championship.
Win	9–3–1	Tatsuya Yamamoto	Submission (rear-naked choke)	Shooto: 12th Round	November 11, 2012	2	3:48	Tokyo, Japan	
Win	8–3–1	Yusei Shimokawa	Decision (unanimous)	Shooto: Gig Tokyo 11	August 25, 2012	3	5:00	Tokyo, Japan	
Win	7–3–1	Masayoshi Kato	Submission (hammerlock)	Shooto: The Rookie Tournament 2011 Final	December 18, 2011	2	3:15	Tokyo, Japan	
Loss	6–3–1	Mikihito Yamagami	Decision (majority)	Shooto: The Way of Shooto 6: Like a Tiger, Like a Dragon	November 19, 2010	2	5:00	Tokyo, Japan	
Win	6–2–1	Takehiro Harusaki	Submission (rear-naked choke)	Shooto: Kitazawa Shooto Vol. 3	May 9, 2010	3	2:29	Tokyo, Japan	
Loss	5–2–1	Noboru Tahara	TKO (punches)	Shooto: Shooting Disco 9: Superman	June 6, 2009	1	4:09	Tokyo, Japan	
Loss	5–1–1	Takeshi Sato	Submission (rear-naked choke)	Shooto: Gig Tokyo 1	February 28, 2009	1	1:14	Tokyo, Japan	
Win	5–0–1	Takehiro Harusaki	Decision (unanimous)	Shooto: Shooto Tradition 2	July 18, 2008	3	5:00	Tokyo, Japan	
Win	4–0–1	Atsushi Takeuchi	Decision (split)	Shooto: Back To Our Roots 5	September 22, 2007	2	5:00	Tokyo, Japan	
Draw	3–0–1	Kenichi Sawada	Draw	Shooto: Back To Our Roots 3	May 18, 2007	2	5:00	Tokyo, Japan	
Win	3–0	Takehiro Ishii	KO (knee)	Shooto: Back To Our Roots 2	March 16, 2007	1	1:33	Tokyo, Japan	
Win	2–0	Hiroaki Takezawa	Submission (armbar)	Shooto: Rookie Tournament Final	December 2, 2006	1	2:36	Tokyo, Japan	Rookie of the Year Tournament Finals
Win	1–0	Hiroyuki Ikeda	Submission (armbar)	Shooto 2006: 10/1 in Kitazawa Town Hall	October 1, 2006	2	2:03	Tokyo, Japan	Rookie of the Year Tournament Semifinals
