= Fight Matrix =

Mixed martial arts websites

Fight Matrix is a mixed martial arts (MMA) ranking system portal. It is one of the sport's most recognized ranking websites.

== Software ==
According to website, "The rankings on this site are software generated, produced by a proprietary engine (CIRRS – Combat Intelli-Rating and Ranking System) and are based only on official results. There is no human intervention involved, which means that all bouts are considered in chronological order to determine the current rankings. The idea is to provide a list that is comparable to the 'popular thought' without bias. However, there are some prediction-based elements. So in summary, you could say the system is a hybrid of popular thought and prediction analysis."

== Rankings ==
The website ranks both male and female MMA fighters from around the world, with up to 8,300+ fighters listed per weight division. It includes current and historical data and all-time MMA rankings. It also provides detailed statistics of the Ultimate Fighting Championships. American and international MMA publications and organizations such as SB Nation's MMA Fighting and Bloody Elbow, Bleacher Report, cagepages.com, Maximum Fighting Championship, Vísir.is, sport.pl, kumite.me, powerlifter.ru, fightnight.fi and mmanytt.se, have used or are using Fight Matrix ranking data. Based on its rankings, it annually names fighter awards in different categories such as: Fighter of the Year, Comeback Fighter of the Year, Rookies of the Year, etc.

== See also ==
- List of MMA ranking portals
