= Cage Force =

Mixed martial arts promoter based in Japan

- Company type: Private
- Industry: Mixed martial arts promotion
- Founded: November 2006
- Headquarters: Japan
- Key people: Toyoki Kubo (GCM president)
- Parent: GCM Communication

Cage Force (former name Demolition Octagon Gear (D.O.G.)) is a defunct Japanese Mixed Martial Arts (MMA) organization operated by Greatest Common Multiple (GCM) Communication. It was the first Japanese MMA organization to feature an octagon cage instead of a ring. Yushin Okami, Eiji Mitsuoka, Kuniyoshi Hironaka and Keita Nakamura experienced a cage match in D.O.G before contract with UFC. It enforced the Unified Rules of Mixed Martial Arts when the changed name to "Cage Force" from "D.O.G.", to prepare Japanese MMA fighters for the UFC. Cage Force tournament winner was entitled to a contract with UFC. Yoshiyuki Yoshida and Takeya Mizugaki have been contracted to the UFC and WEC by winning the tournament.

== History ==
=== D.O.G. ===
On March 12, 2005, the first event of D.O.G. held at Differ Ariake in Tokyo, Japan. Yushin Okami defeated Brian "Tattoo" Foster by Submission at Main event.

On June 11, 2005, Second event "D.O.G. 2" held. Yushin Okami defeated Nick Thompson by Thompson's Elbow Injury at 29 seconds of the 1st round. Hidetaka Monma defeated Dave Strasser by KO of the 1st round.

=== Cage Force ===
On September 28, 2006, GCM Communication announced the inauguration of "World Wide Cage Network (WWCN)" meaning cooperation with five MMA organizations in the world. GCM Communication changed name to "Cage Force (Named by Caol Uno)" from the "D.O.G.". and Cage Force held On November 25, 2006.

On 2007, Cage Forece held the lightweight and Welterweight tournament. Artur Oumakhanov defeated Kotetsu Boku via Split Decision and Won Cage Force lightweight Championship. Yoshiyuki Yoshida defeated Dan Hardy via DQ and Won Cage Force Welterweight Championship. Yoshida contracted with the UFC, but Oumakhanov could not contract with the UFC because he lost to Andre Amade at Hero's During the tournament.

On 2008, Cage Forece held the Featherweight and Bantamweight tournament. Yuji Hoshino defeated Akiyo Nishiura via Unanimous Decision and Won Cage Force Featherweight Championship. Takeya Mizugaki defeated Masahiro Oishi by TKO and Won Cage Force Bantamweight Championship. Mizugaki contracted with the WEC and fought Miguel Torres for the WEC Bantamweight Championship of WEC 40 on April 5, 2009.

=== Valkyrie ===
On September 27, 2008, Valkyrie was established and the first event was promoted In the first part of "Cage Force EX" on November 8, 2008.

=== Stopping the GCM ===
On November 11, 2011, Wajyutsu Keisyukai announced the inauguration of new players association. and They Separated from the GCM Communication because virtually cessation of activity by GCM. Cage Force was Virtually completed in the last event "Cage Force 20" on November 28, 2010.

== Events ==
=== Cage Force ===
No.	Event	Date	Venue	Location	Notes
27	Cage Force 20	November 28, 2010	Differ Ariake Arena	Ariake, Tokyo, Japan	
26	Cage Force 19	September 26, 2010	Differ Ariake Arena	Ariake, Tokyo, Japan	
25	Cage Force 18	July 25, 2010	Differ Ariake Arena	Ariake, Tokyo, Japan	
24	Cage Force 17	June 19, 2010	Differ Ariake Arena	Ariake, Tokyo, Japan	
23	Cage Force 16	April 11, 2010	Differ Ariake Arena	Ariake, Tokyo, Japan	
22	Cage Force 15	February 11, 2010	Differ Ariake Arena	Ariake, Tokyo, Japan	
21	Cage Force 14	December 5, 2009	Differ Ariake Arena	Ariake, Tokyo, Japan	
20	Cage Force 13	October 24, 2009	Differ Ariake Arena	Ariake, Tokyo, Japan	
19	Cage Force 12	September 12, 2009	Differ Ariake Arena	Ariake, Tokyo, Japan	
18	Cage Force & Valkyrie	July 12, 2009	Differ Ariake Arena	Ariake, Tokyo, Japan	
17	Cage Force 11	June 27, 2009	Differ Ariake Arena	Ariake, Tokyo, Japan	
16	Cage Force 10	April 25, 2009	Differ Ariake Arena	Ariake, Tokyo, Japan	
15	Cage Force EX Eastern Bound	February 28, 2009	Tokorozawa City Gymnasium	Tokorozawa, Saitama, Japan	
14	Cage Force 9	December 6, 2008	Differ Ariake Arena	Ariake, Tokyo, Japan	
13	Cage Force EX Eastern Bound	November 8, 2008	Differ Ariake Arena	Ariake, Tokyo, Japan	
12	Cage Force 8	September 27, 2008	Differ Ariake Arena	Ariake, Tokyo, Japan	
11	Cage Force 7	June 22, 2008	Differ Ariake Arena	Ariake, Tokyo, Japan	
10	Cage Force 6	April 5, 2008	Differ Ariake Arena	Ariake, Tokyo, Japan	
9	Cage Force EX Eastern Bound	May 27, 2007	Differ Ariake Arena	Ariake, Tokyo, Japan	
8	Cage Force 5	December 1, 2007	Differ Ariake Arena	Ariake, Tokyo, Japan	
7	Cage Force EX Eastern Bound	February 11, 2008	Differ Ariake Arena	Ariake, Tokyo, Japan	
6	Cage Force 4	September 8, 2007	Differ Ariake Arena	Ariake, Tokyo, Japan	
5	Cage Force 3	June 9, 2007	Differ Ariake Arena	Ariake, Tokyo, Japan	
4	Cage Force EX Eastern Bound	May 27, 2007	Differ Ariake Arena	Ariake, Tokyo, Japan	
3	Cage Force 2	March 17, 2007	Differ Ariake Arena	Ariake, Tokyo, Japan	
2	Cage Force EX Western Bound	February 17, 2007	Yonago Industrial Gymnasium	Yonago, Tottori, Japan	
1	Cage Force 1	November 25, 2006	Differ Ariake Arena	Ariake, Tokyo, Japan	

=== D.O.G. ===
No.	Event	Date	Venue	Location	Notes
7	D.O.G. 7	September 9, 2006	Differ Ariake Arena	Ariake, Tokyo, Japan	
6	D.O.G. 6	June 11, 2006	Differ Ariake Arena	Ariake, Tokyo, Japan	
5	D.O.G. 5	April 1, 2006	Differ Ariake Arena	Ariake, Tokyo, Japan	
4	D.O.G. 4	December 11, 2005	Differ Ariake Arena	Ariake, Tokyo, Japan	
3	D.O.G. 3	September 17, 2005	Differ Ariake Arena	Ariake, Tokyo, Japan	
2	D.O.G. 2	June 11, 2005	Differ Ariake Arena	Ariake, Tokyo, Japan	
1	D.O.G. 1	March 12, 2005	Differ Ariake Arena	Ariake, Tokyo, Japan	

== Current Cage Force champions ==
Men's division	Upper weight limit	Last champions
Middleweight	85 kg (187.4 lb; 13.4 st)	N/A
Welterweight	77 kg (169.8 lb; 12.1 st)	(Japan) Yoshiyuki Yoshida
Lightweight	70 kg (154.3 lb; 11.0 st)	(Japan) Kuniyoshi Hironaka
Featherweight	65 kg (143.3 lb; 10.2 st)	(Japan) Yuji Hoshino
Bantamweight	60 kg (132.3 lb; 9.4 st)	(Japan) Takeya Mizugaki

== Title history ==
=== Welterweight Championship ===
Weight limit: 77 kg (169.8 lb; 12.1 st)

No.	Name	Event	Date	Defenses
1	(Japan) Yoshiyuki Yoshida def. Dan Hardy	Cage Force 5: Ariake, Tokyo, Japan	December 1, 2007	
Yoshida vacated the title when he left Cage Force for the UFC.

=== Lightweight Championship ===
Weight limit: 70 kg (154.3 lb; 11.0 st)

No.	Name	Event	Date	Defenses
1	(Russia) Artur Oumakhanov def. Kotetsu Boku	Cage Force 5: Ariake, Tokyo, Japan	December 1, 2007	
Oumakhanov vactated the title when he left Cage Force for the Dream.
2	(Japan) Mizuto Hirota def. Tomonari Kanomata	Cage Force 6: Ariake, Tokyo, Japan	April 5, 2008	1. draw. Katsuya Inoue at Cage Force EX Eastern Bound on February 28, 2009
Hirota vactated the title when he left Cage Force for the Sengoku.
3	(Japan) Kuniyoshi Hironaka def. Yoshihiro Koyama	Cage Force 12: Ariake, Tokyo, Japan	September 12, 2009	

=== Featherweight Championship ===
Weight limit: 65 kg (143.3 lb; 10.2 st)

No.	Name	Event	Date	Defenses
1	(Japan) Yuji Hoshino def. Akiyo Nishiura	Cage Force 9 Ariake, Tokyo, Japan	December 6, 2008	

=== Bantamweight Championship ===
Weight limit: 60 kg (132.3 lb; 9.4 st)

No.	Name	Event	Date	Defenses
1	(Japan) Takeya Mizugaki def. Masahiro Oishi	Cage Force 9 Ariake, Tokyo, Japan	December 6, 2008	
Mizugaki vacated the title when he left Cage Force for the WEC.

== Tournaments ==
Event	Date	Weight class	Winner	Runner-up
Cage Force 5	December 1, 2007	Welterweight	(Japan) Yoshiyuki Yoshida	(England) Dan Hardy
Cage Force 5	December 1, 2007	Lightweight	(Russia) Artur Oumakhanov	(South Korea) Kotetsu Boku
Cage Force 9	December 6, 2008	Featherweight	(Japan) Yuji Hoshino	(Japan) Akiyo Nishiura
Cage Force 9	December 6, 2008	Bantamweight	(Japan) Takeya Mizugaki	(Japan) Matake Oishi

=== Welterweight Tournament Bracket ===
Quarterfinals
(Japan)	Yoshiyuki Yoshida	TKO
(Australia)	Matt Cain	1
(Japan)	Akira Kikuchi	TKO
(United States)	Jared Rollins	2
(Japan)	Hidetaka Monma	TKO
(Finland)	Janne Tulirinta	1
(Japan)	Daizo Ishige	DEC
(England)	Dan Hardy	3

Semifinals
(Japan)	Yoshiyuki Yoshida	TKO
(Japan)	Akira Kikuchi	1
(Japan)	Hidetaka Monma	TKO
(England)	Dan Hardy	3

Final
(Japan)	Yoshiyuki Yoshida	DQ
(England)	Dan Hardy	2

=== Lightweight Tournament Bracket ===
Opening round
(South Korea)	Kotetsu Boku	SUB
(Finland)	Jarkko Latomaki	3
(United States)	David Gardner
BYE
(Japan)	Takumi Nakayama	DEC
(Japan)	Yoichi Fukumoto	3
(Japan)	Eiji Mitsuoka	SUB
(United States)	Brian Cobb	3
(Japan)	Tomonari Kanomata	TKO
(Australia)	Jacob Sidic	1
(Japan)	Wataru Takahashi	TKO
(Korea)	In Seok Kim	2
(Japan)	Watatu Miki	TKO
(Japan)	Yasunori Kanehara	2
(United States)	Kaynan Kaku	TKO
(Russia)	Artur Oumakhanov	2

Quarterfinal
(South Korea)	Kotetsu Boku	DEC
(United States)	David Gardner	3
(Japan)	Takumi Nakayama	TKO
(Japan)	Eiji Mitsuoka	1
(Japan)	Tomonari Kanomata	DEC
(Japan)	Wataru Takahashi	3
(Japan)	Watatu Miki	DEC
(Russia)	Artur Oumakhanov	3

Semifinal
(South Korea)	Kotetsu Boku	DEC
(Japan)	Eiji Mitsuoka	3
(Japan)	Tomonari Kanomata	TKO
(Russia)	Artur Oumakhanov	2

Final
(South Korea)	Kotetsu Boku	DEC
(Russia)	Artur Oumakhanov	3

=== Featherweight Tournament Bracket ===
Quarterfinals
(Japan)	Fanjin Son	TKO
(Japan)	Tomohiko Hori	1
(Japan)	Akiyo Nishiura	KO
(Korea)	Jong Man Kim	1
(Japan)	Yuji Hoshino	DEC
(Canada)	Antonio Carvalho	3
(Japan)	Takeshi Yamazaki	SUB
(Japan)	Daiki Ozaki	2

Semifinals
(Japan)	Akiyo Nishiura	DEC
(Japan)	Fanjin Son	3
(Japan)	Yuji Hoshino	SUB
(Japan)	Takeshi Yamazaki	3

Final
(Japan)	Akiyo Nishiura	DEC
(Japan)	Yuji Hoshino	3

=== Bantamweight Tournament Bracket ===
Quarterfinals
(Japan)	Takeya Mizugaki	KO
(Japan)	Daichi Fujiwara	1
(Japan)	Taiyo Nakahara	TKO
(Japan)	Ryota Uozumi	2
(Japan)	Tetsu Suzuki	TKO
(Japan)	Katsuya Toida	1
(Japan)	Masahiro Oishi	TKO
(Republic of Ireland)	Paul McVeigh	2

Semifinals
(Japan)	Takeya Mizugaki
BYE
(Japan)	Tetsu Suzuki	DEC
(Japan)	Masahiro Oishi	3

Final
(Japan)	Takeya Mizugaki	TKO
(Japan)	Masahiro Oishi	2

1: Taiyo Nakahara was set to face Takeya Mizugaki in the semifinal round of the Bantamweight tournament. However, Nakahara had to withdraw due to an injury and Mizugaki was given a bye into the Final round.

== See also ==
- Valkyrie
