= List of Shooto Pacific Rim champions =

In 2005 the Shooto Organization decided to create splinter Shooto organizations around the world, with their own rankings and champions. Along with a European and American Shooto organization, a Pacific Rim organization was created focusing on Asia (but mostly Japan). This is the title history for the Pacific Rim titles.

== Title histories ==
=== Middleweight Championship ===
Weight limit: 77 kg (169.8 lb)

| No. | Name | Date | Defenses |
|---|---|---|---|
| 1 | (Japan) Keita Nakamura def. Ronald Jhun | July 21, 2006 | |
Nakamura vacated the title on June 6, 2007, as he was unable to defend the title in the mandated time
| 2 | (South Africa) Xavier Lucas def. Yoshitaro Niimi | October 26, 2008 | 1. def. Akihiro Yamazaki on September 22, 2009 |
Lucas vacated the title on January 28, 2010, for undisclosed reasons
| 3 | (Japan) Yoichiro Sato def. Jung Min Kang | March 22, 2010 | 1. def. Takasuke Kume on August 7, 2010; 2. drew with Akihiro Murayama on February 26, 2011 |
| 4 | (Japan) Akihiro Murayama | June 11, 2011 | |
Murayama vacated the title on March 1, 2019, for undisclosed reasons
| 5 | (Japan) Soki def. Yukinari Tamura | June 16, 2019 | |
| 6 | (Japan) Yukinari Tamura | May 15, 2022 | |

=== Welterweight Championship ===
Weight limit: 70 kg (154.3 lb)

| No. | Name | Date | Defenses |
|---|---|---|---|
| 1 | (South Korea) Kotetsu Boku def. Ryan Bow | January 29, 2005 | |
Boku vacated the title on December 17, 2005 as he suffered a knee injury which prevented him from defending his title in the mandatory time.
| 2 | (Japan) Mitsuhiro Ishida def. Kenichiro Togashi | February 17, 2006 | |
Ishida vacated the title on January 12, 2007 as he was unable to defend the title in the mandated time
| 3 | (Japan) Takashi Nakakura def. Mizuto Hirota | February 17, 2007 | |
Nakakura vacated the title on May 3, 2008 after winning the world title.
| 4 | (Japan) Yusuke Endo def. Kenichiro Togashi | February 17, 2007 | 1. def. Kotetsu Boku on September 22, 2009 |
Endo vacated the title on September 26, 2010 to challenge Willamy Freire for the Shooto 154lb title.
| 5 | (Japan) Yoshihiro Koyama def. Shinji Sasaki | January 10, 2011 | 1. def. Kenichiro Togashi on September 23, 2011 |
Koyama vacated the title to challenge Kuniyoshi Hironaka for the Shooto 154lb title.
| 6 | (Japan) Shinji Sasaki def. Shin Kochiwa | January 20, 2013 | |
| 7 | (Japan) Nobumitsu Osawa def. Shinji Sasaki | March 16, 2014 | |
| 8 | (Japan) Koshi Matsumoto def. Nobumitsu Osawa | April 18, 2015 | 1. draw. Yuki Kawana on July 26, 2015; 2. def. Hiroki Aoki on January 11, 2016 |
Matsumoto vacated the title to challenge Yuki Kawana for the Shooto 154lb title
| 9 | (Japan) Yuki Kawana def. Hiroki Aoki | July 23, 2017 | |
Matsumoto vacated the title on July 12, 2020, after winning the world title
| 10 | (Japan) Shutaro Debana def. Yu Tanaka | December 20, 2020 | 1. def. Max Sugimoto on December 18, 2021 |

=== Lightweight Championship ===
Weight limit: 65 kg (143.3 lb)

| No. | Name | Date | Defenses |
|---|---|---|---|
| 1 | (Japan) Rumina Sato def. Makoto Ishikawa | March 11, 2005 | |
Sato suffered an injury which prevented him from defending his title in the mandatory time period per Shooto regulations.
| 2 | (Japan) Akitoshi Tamura def. Tenkei Fujimiya | February 17, 2007 | |
Due to Tamura winning the Shooto World Lightweight belt he was asked to relinquish the Pacific Rim Title.
| 3 | (Japan) Taiki Tsuchiya def. Hideki Kadowaki | January 23, 2010 | 1. def. Issei Tamura on July 19, 2010; 2. def. Gustavo Falciroli on November 19, 2010 |
Tsuchiya vacates the title due to losing a non-title match to Takeshi Inoue on April 30, 2011.
| 4 | (Japan) Yusuke Yachi def. Wataru Miki | November 11, 2012 | 1. def. Yuji Hoshino on March 17, 2013 |
Yachi vacated the title signing with Pacific Xtreme Combat
| 5 | (Japan) Yoshifumi Nakamura | January 25, 2015 | |
| 6 | (Japan) Yutaka Saito def. Yoshifumi Nakamura | May 3, 2015 | |
Saito vacated the title to challenge Yoshifumi Nakamura for the Shooto 143lb title
| 7 | (Japan) Ryogo Takahashi def. Tomoya Hirakawa | November 12, 2016 | 1. def. Jin Aoi on October 15, 2017 |
Takahashi vacated the title following an injury which rendered him incapable of defending the title.
| 8 | (Japan) Mitsuhiro Toma def. Derricott Yamamoto | June 17, 2018 | 1. def. Akira Takano on June 30, 2019 |
| 9 | (Japan) Takashi Nakayama def. Mitsuhiro Toma | January 26, 2020 | |
| 10 | (Japan) Keisuke Sasu def. Takashi Nakayama | September 19, 2020 | 1. def. Taison Naito on January 30, 2021 |
Sasu vacated the title to challenge Ryoji Kudo for the Shooto 143lb title

=== Featherweight Championship ===
Weight limit: 60 kg (132.3 lb)

| No. | Name | Date | Defenses |
|---|---|---|---|
| 1 | (Japan) Koetsu Okazaki def. Hiromasa Ogikubo | October 17, 2009 | 1. def. Tetsu Suzuki on July 19, 2010 |
Okazaki vacated
| 2 | (Japan) Yuta Sasaki def. Tetsu Suzuki | January 20, 2013 | 1. def. Kenji Yamamoto on July 27, 2013 |
Sasaki vacated
| 3 | (Japan) Yuta Nezu def. Kota Onojima | March 16, 2014 | 1. def. Keita Ishibashi on September 27, 2014 |
Nezu vacated
| 4 | (Japan) Daichi Takenaka def. Takuya Ogura | March 21, 2016 | |
Takenaka vacated the title on 2016 when he signed with ONE Championship.
| 5 | (Japan) Keita Ishibashi def. Ryo Okada | November 12, 2016 | |
Ishibashi vacated the title to challenge Shoko Sato for the Shooto 132lb title
| 6 | (Japan) Kazuma Sone def. Mamoru Uoi | January 28, 2018 | |
| 7 | (Japan) Ryo Okada | January 27, 2019 | 1. drew with Tatsuya Ando on September 22, 2019 |
Okada vacated the title to challenge Kazuma Kuramoto for the interim Shooto 132lb title
| 8 | (Japan) Tatsuya Ando def. Takumi Tamaru | August 1, 2020 | 1. def. Hayato Ishii on September 20, 2021 |
Ando vacated the title to challenge Ryo Okada for the Shooto 132lb title
| 9 | (Japan) Kota Onojima def. Nobuki Fuji | January 16, 2022 | |
| 10 | (Japan) Hayato Ishii | May 22, 2022 | |
| 11 | (Japan) Nobuki Fuji | November 27, 2022 | 1. def. Takuma Sudo on January 28, 2024 |

== See also ==
- Shooto
- List of Shooto champions
