= Mizuto Hirota =

Japanese mixed martial artist (born 1981)

- Born: May 5, 1981 (age 45); Isahaya, Nagasaki, Japan
- Native name: 廣田 瑞人
- Other names: Pugnus; Pug Prince (破拳王子); Kobushi no pitbull(拳のピットブル)
- Nationality: Japanese
- Height: 5 ft 7 in (1.70 m)
- Weight: 71 kg (157 lb; 11 st 3 lb)
- Division: Lightweight; Featherweight
- Reach: 67 in (170 cm)
- Style: Boxing, Sumo
- Stance: Orthodox
- Fighting out of: Sumida, Tokyo, Japan
- Team: Gutsman Shooto Dojo; Cave Gym (2010-present)
- Years active: 2005–present

Mixed martial arts record
- Total: 31
- Wins: 18
- By knockout: 10
- By decision: 8
- Losses: 11
- By knockout: 1
- By submission: 1
- By decision: 9
- Draws: 2

Other information
- Mixed martial arts record from Sherdog
- Last updated on: August 2, 2009

Mizuto Hirota (Japanese: 廣田瑞人, Hirota Mizuto; born May 5, 1981) is a Japanese mixed martial artist currently competing in the Featherweight division of the Rizin Fighting Federation. A professional competitor since 2005, he appeared in the Japanese MMA event Dynamite!! 2009 event and has also competed for Ultimate Fighting Championship, Shooto, and Strikeforce.

== Background ==
Born and raised in Japan, Hirota experienced success as an amateur boxer and sumo, winning All-Japan titles in both disciplines.

== Mixed martial arts career ==
=== Early career ===
Hirota made his professional debut for Shooto, winning his first two fights by TKO and then won his next four fights all by unanimous decision to reach an undefeated professional record of 6–0. Hirota then faced Takashi Nakakura for the newly vacated Shooto Pacific Rim Welterweight Championship. Hirota was handed his first professional loss via unanimous decision and then lost his next fight, also by unanimous decision.

Hirota then signed with Cage Force, and in his debut, knocked out his opponent 16 seconds into the fight before getting another win via TKO.

In his next fight in April 2008, at Cage Force 6, Hirota defeated Tomonari Kanomata to win the Cage Force Lightweight Championship.

=== Sengoku ===
Hirota then entered the Sengoku 2008 Lightweight Grand Prix where he won his first-round fight by knocking out the last IFL Lightweight Champion, Ryan Schultz, at Sengoku 4 in August 2008. He was then eliminated from the tournament in the semi-finals after losing by unanimous decision against Kazunori Yokota at World Victory Road Presents: Sengoku 6 in November the same year.

In February 2009 he defended his Cage Force title when he fought to a draw with multiple-time King of Pancrase, Katsuya Inoue, and in May 2009 he defeated PRIDE veteran Mitsuhiro Ishida by knockout at Shooto Tradition Final.

On August 2, 2009, at Sengoku 9, Hirota was matched up with the eventual Sengoku Lightweight Grand Prix Champion and the inaugural Sengoku Lightweight Champion, Satoru Kitaoka. Hirota, who was an underdog going in to the fight, had to defend multiple submission-attempts by Kitaoka during the first round, but came back in the second landing strikes on the feet while stopping Kitaoka's takedown-attempts. In the third, Kitaoka was able to take Hirota down and control him on the ground eventually resulting in a yellow-card inactivity-warning for Hirota as he did not improve his position. The fourth round saw Hirota damage Kitaoka with knee-strikes while on the feet, prompting Kitaoka to shoot in for a takedown. Hirota defended it and continued to land knees to the head of the grounded Kitaoka which forced the referee to step in at 2:50, giving Hirota the TKO victory to become the new Sengoku Lightweight Champion.

=== Dynamite!! 2009 ===
On December 31, 2009, Hirota faced DREAM and WAMMA Lightweight Champion Shinya Aoki. In the first round Aoki caught Hirota in a hammerlock. When Hirota refused to submit, Aoki broke Hirota's arm and won the fight.

On March 7, 2010, Hirota announced during Sengoku 12 that he would be vacating his belt due to his injuries sustained at Dynamite!! 2009.

=== DEEP ===
A year after he officially vacated his Sengoku Lightweight Championship belt, Hirota began fighting for DEEP. Hirota's debut for the organization was against Katsunori Kikuno for the DEEP Lightweight Championship and Hirota won via unanimous decision, and then defended his belt against Seichi Ikemoto, winning again via unanimous decision. Hirota then vacated his title in April 2012.

=== Strikeforce ===
On May 29, 2012, it was announced that Hirota would make his United States debut for Strikeforce in July 2012 against Pat Healy. In a back and forth bout, Hirota showcased technical boxing and some take down defense, but Healy was able to land more during the clinch. Hirota lost the close battle by unanimous decision (30-27, 29–28, 29–28). Strikeforce commentator and former UFC Middleweight Champion Pat Miletich stated the decision was affected by the home town favoring their own fighter.

Hirota was next scheduled to face Jorge Gurgel on September 29, 2012, but the event was cancelled before the company ceased operations. Hirota was signed along with many other Strikeforce competitors to compete in the UFC.

=== Ultimate Fighting Championship ===
Hirota faced Rani Yahya on March 3, 2013, at UFC on Fuel TV 8. The fight was Hirota's first fight as a Featherweight. After losing the first two rounds, Hiroto was able to keep the fight standing in the third, but it was not enough under the scorecard and he lost his debut via unanimous decision.

In his second UFC fight, Hirota faced Rodrigo Damm at UFC on Fuel TV: Nogueira vs. Werdum on June 8, 2013. He lost the back-and-forth fight via split decision and was subsequently released from the promotion following the loss.

==== Road to UFC: Japan ====
In June 2015, Hirota was announced as one of the eight featherweights competing on Road to UFC: Japan, a show in the style of The Ultimate Fighter. On the show he faced Nobumitsu Osawa in the quarter-finals and won by decision. He then faced Daiki Hata in the semifinals and again won by decision. Hirota ultimately faced Teruto Ishihara in the finals at UFC Fight Night 75. Post-fight the UFC announced that Hirota and Ishihara would both be awarded contracts.

Hirota was expected to face Cole Miller on October 15, 2016, at UFC Fight Night 97. However, the promotion announced on October 6 that they had cancelled the event entirely. In turn, the fight was rescheduled and eventually took place on December 17, 2016, at UFC on Fox 22 Hirota won the bout by unanimous decision.

Mizuto Hirota faced Alexander Volkanovski on June 10, 2017, at UFC Fight Night 110. He lost the fight by unanimous decision.

Hirota was expected to face Charles Rosa on September 23, 2017, at UFC Fight Night 117. After struggling with the weigh-in, Hirota was forced to pull from the event due to health concerns. He was deemed unfit to compete by the UFC medical team.

Hirota faced Ross Pearson in a lightweight bout on February 11, 2018, at UFC 221. He lost the fight via unanimous decision.

Hirota faced Christos Giagos on December 2, 2018, at UFC Fight Night 142. He lost the fight via unanimous decision.

=== Rizin ===
After being released from the UFC after three straight losses, Hirota signed with Rizin Fighting Federation and faced Roberto de Souza at Rizin 17 on July 28, 2019. He lost the bout in the first round via knockout.

== Championships and accomplishments ==
- Cage Force
  - Cage Force Lightweight Championship (One time)
- DEEP
  - DEEP Lightweight Championship (One time)
  - One Successful Defense
- Sengoku
  - Sengoku Lightweight Championship (One time, final)
- Ultimate Fighting Championship
  - Road to UFC: Japan Featherweight Tournament Co-Winner (Drew with Teruto Ishihara)

== Mixed martial arts record ==
Professional record breakdown
31 matches	18 wins	11 losses
By knockout	10	1
By submission	0	1
By decision	8	9
Draws	2	

Res.	Record	Opponent	Method	Event	Date	Round	Time	Location	Notes
Loss	18–11–2	Roberto de Souza	KO (punches)	Rizin 17	July 28, 2019	1	3:05	Saitama, Japan	
Loss	18–10–2	Christos Giagos	Decision (unanimous)	UFC Fight Night: dos Santos vs. Tuivasa	December 2, 2018	3	5:00	Adelaide, Australia	
Loss	18–9–2	Ross Pearson	Decision (unanimous)	UFC 221	February 11, 2018	3	5:00	Perth, Australia	Return to Lightweight.
Loss	18–8–2	Alexander Volkanovski	Decision (unanimous)	UFC Fight Night: Lewis vs. Hunt	June 11, 2017	3	5:00	Auckland, New Zealand	
Win	18–7–2	Cole Miller	Decision (unanimous)	UFC on Fox: VanZant vs. Waterson	December 17, 2016	3	5:00	Sacramento, California, United States	
Draw	17–7–2	Teruto Ishihara	Draw (split)	UFC Fight Night: Barnett vs. Nelson	September 27, 2015	3	5:00	Saitama, Japan	Road to UFC: Japan Tournament Final.
Win	17–7–1	Kyu Hwa Kim	TKO (soccer kick and punches)	DEEP: Dream Impact 2014: Omisoka Special	December 31, 2014	2	0:33	Saitama, Japan	
Win	16–7–1	Masakazu Imanari	TKO (punches)	DEEP: 69 Impact	October 26, 2014	2	1:38	Tokyo, Japan	
Win	15–7–1	Daisuke Nakamura	Decision (unanimous)	DEEP: 66 Impact	April 29, 2014	3	5:00	Tokyo, Japan	
Loss	14–7–1	Rodrigo Damm	Decision (split)	UFC on Fuel TV: Nogueira vs. Werdum	June 8, 2013	3	5:00	Fortaleza, Brazil	
Loss	14–6–1	Rani Yahya	Decision (unanimous)	UFC on Fuel TV: Silva vs. Stann	March 3, 2013	3	5:00	Saitama, Japan	Featherweight debut.
Loss	14–5–1	Pat Healy	Decision (unanimous)	Strikeforce: Rockhold vs. Kennedy	July 14, 2012	3	5:00	Portland, Oregon, United States	
Win	14–4–1	Seichi Ikemoto	Decision (unanimous)	DEEP: 57 Impact	February 18, 2012	3	5:00	Tokyo, Japan	Defended the DEEP Lightweight Championship.
Win	13–4–1	Katsunori Kikuno	Decision (unanimous)	DEEP: 55 Impact	August 26, 2011	3	5:00	Tokyo, Japan	Won the DEEP Lightweight Championship.
Loss	12–4–1	Shinya Aoki	Technical Submission (hammerlock)	Dynamite!! The Power of Courage 2009	December 31, 2009	1	2:17	Saitama, Japan	
Win	12–3–1	Satoru Kitaoka	TKO (knees)	World Victory Road Presents: Sengoku 9	August 2, 2009	4	2:50	Saitama, Japan	Won the Sengoku Lightweight Championship. Sengoku Lightweight Grand Prix Final.
Win	11–3–1	Mitsuhiro Ishida	TKO (punches)	Shooto: Shooto Tradition Final	May 10, 2009	1	1:33	Tokyo, Japan	
Draw	10–3–1	Katsuya Inoue	Draw	GCM: Cage Force EX	February 28, 2009	3	5:00	Saitama, Japan	Retained the Cage Force Lightweight Championship.
Loss	10–3	Kazunori Yokota	Decision (unanimous)	World Victory Road Presents: Sengoku 6	November 1, 2008	3	5:00	Saitama, Japan	Sengoku Lightweight Grand Prix Semifinal.
Win	10–2	Ryan Schultz	KO (superman punch)	World Victory Road Presents: Sengoku 4	August 24, 2008	2	4:25	Saitama, Japan	Sengoku Lightweight Grand Prix Quarterfinal.
Win	9–2	Tomonari Kanomata	TKO (punches)	GCM: Cage Force 6	April 5, 2008	1	1:00	Tokyo, Japan	Won the Cage Force Lightweight Championship.
Win	8–2	Johnny Frachey	TKO (punches)	Cage Force EX Eastern Bound	February 11, 2008	2	0:08	Tokyo, Japan	
Win	7–2	Do Gi Sin	KO (punches)	Cage Force 5	December 1, 2007	1	0:16	Tokyo, Japan	
Loss	6–2	Ganjo Tentsuku	Decision (unanimous)	Shooto: Shooting Disco 2: The Heat Rises Tonight	August 5, 2007	3	5:00	Tokyo, Japan	
Loss	6–1	Takashi Nakakura	Decision (unanimous)	Shooto: Back To Our Roots 1	February 17, 2007	3	5:00	Yokohama, Japan	For the Shooto Pacific Rim Welterweight (154 lbs) Championship.
Win	6–0	Jin Kazeta	Decision (unanimous)	Shooto: The Devilock	May 12, 2006	3	5:00	Tokyo, Japan	
Win	5–0	Danilo Cherman	Decision (unanimous)	Shooto: The Victory of the Truth	February 17, 2006	3	5:00	Tokyo, Japan	
Win	4–0	Kabuto Kokage	Decision (unanimous)	Shooto: 12/17 in Shinjuku Face	December 17, 2005	2	5:00	Tokyo, Japan	
Win	3–0	Yoshihiro Koyama	Decision (unanimous)	Shooto: 9/23 in Korakuen Hall	September 23, 2005	2	5:00	Tokyo, Japan	
Win	2–0	Komei Okada	TKO (punches)	Shooto: 6/3 in Kitazawa Town Hall	June 3, 2005	1	4:56	Tokyo, Japan	
Win	1–0	Masaaki Yamamori	TKO (punches)	Shooto: 2/6 in Kitazawa Town Hall	February 6, 2005	2	1:27	Tokyo, Japan	

Preceded by Satoru Kitaoka	2nd Sengoku Lightweight Champion; August 2, 2009 – March 7, 2010	Vacant due to injury
