= 2004 in Shooto =

Mixed martial arts events

Information
- First date: January 24, 2004
- Last date: December 14, 2004

Events
- Total events: 17

Fights
- Total fights: 129
- Title fights: 4

Chronology
2003 in Shooto	2004 in Shooto	2005 in Shooto

The year 2004 is the 16th year in the history of Shooto, a mixed martial arts promotion based in Japan. In 2004 Shooto held 17 events beginning with, Shooto 2004: 1/24 in Korakuen Hall.

== Title fights ==
Title fights in 2004
Weight class				Method	Round	Time	Event	Notes
Flyweight	Mamoru Yamaguchi (c)	vs.	Robson Moura	Draw	3	5:00	Shooto: 9/26 in Kourakuen Hall	(Note: For the Flyweight Championship.)
Bantamweight	Ryota Matsune (c)	def.	Kentaro Imaizumi	Decision (Split)	3	5:00	Shooto: Wanna Shooto 2004	(Note: For the Bantamweight Championship.)
Lightweight	Tatsuya Kawajiri	def.	Vítor Ribeiro (c)	TKO (Punches)	2	3:11	Shooto: 3/22 in Korakuen Hall	(Note: For the Lightweight Championship.)
Welterweight	Akira Kikuchi	def.	Jake Shields (c)	Decision (Unanimous)	3	5:00	Shooto: Year End Show 2004	(Note: For the Welterweight Championship.)

== Events list ==
#	Event Title	Date	Arena	Location
158	Shooto: Year End Show 2004	December 14, 2004	Yoyogi National Gymnasium	Tokyo, Japan
157	G-Shooto: G-Shooto 01	November 26, 2004	Zepp Tokyo	Tokyo, Japan
156	Shooto: Rookie Tournament 2004 Final	November 25, 2004	Kitazawa Town Hall	Setagaya, Tokyo, Japan
155	Shooto: Wanna Shooto 2004	November 12, 2004	Korakuen Hall	Tokyo, Japan
154	Shooto 2004: 10/17 in Osaka Prefectural Gymnasium	October 17, 2004	Osaka Prefectural Gymnasium	Osaka, Kansai, Japan
153	Shooto: 9/26 in Kourakuen Hall	September 26, 2004	Korakuen Hall	Tokyo, Japan
152	Shooto: Gig Central 6	September 12, 2004	Nagoya Civic Assembly Hall	Nagoya, Aichi, Japan
151	Shooto: 7/16 in Korakuen Hall	July 16, 2004	Korakuen Hall	Tokyo, Japan
150	Shooto 2004: 7/4 in Kitazawa Town Hall	July 4, 2004	Kitazawa Town Hall	Setagaya, Tokyo, Japan
149	Shooto: Shooto Junkie Is Back!	June 27, 2004	Chiba Blue Field	Chiba, Japan
148	Shooto 2004: 5/3 in Korakuen Hall	May 3, 2004	Korakuen Hall	Tokyo, Japan
147	Shooto 2004: 4/16 in Kitazawa Town Hall	April 16, 2004	Kitazawa Town Hall	Setagaya, Tokyo, Japan
146	Shooto 2004: 4/11 in Osaka Prefectural Gymnasium	April 11, 2004	Osaka Prefectural Gymnasium	Osaka, Kansai, Japan
145	Shooto: Gig Central 5	March 28, 2004	Nagoya Civic Assembly Hall	Nagoya, Aichi, Japan
144	Shooto: 3/22 in Korakuen Hall	March 22, 2004	Korakuen Hall	Tokyo, Japan
143	Shooto: 3/4 in Kitazawa Town Hall	March 4, 2004	Kitazawa Town Hall	Setagaya, Tokyo, Japan
142	Shooto 2004: 1/24 in Korakuen Hall	January 24, 2004	Korakuen Hall	Tokyo, Japan

== Shooto 2004: 1/24 in Korakuen Hall ==
Shooto 2004: 1/24 in Korakuen Hall was an event held on January 24, 2004 at Korakuen Hall in Tokyo, Japan.

=== Results ===
Main Card
Weight class				Method	Round	Time	Notes
	Hiroyuki Takaya	vs.	Joao Roque	Draw	3	5:00
	Marcos Galvao	def.	Shuichiro Katsumura	Decision (Unanimous)	3	5:00
	Makoto Ishikawa	def.	Tetsuo Katsuta	Decision (Unanimous)	3	5:00
	Kotetsu Boku	def.	Kohei Yasumi	Decision (Unanimous)	3	5:00
	Mitsuhiro Ishida	def.	Takayuki Okochi	Decision (Unanimous)	2	5:00
	Kenji Osawa	def.	Hiroyuki Tanaka	Decision (Unanimous)	2	5:00
	Tetsu Suzuki	def.	Yasushi Watanabe	Technical Submission (Armbar)	1	0:52
	Junichi Sase	def.	Yuki Shojo	Decision (Unanimous)	2	5:00

== Shooto: 3/4 in Kitazawa Town Hall ==
Shooto: 3/4 in Kitazawa Town Hall was an event held on March 4, 2004 at Kitazawa Town Hall in Setagaya, Tokyo, Japan.

=== Results ===
Main Card
Weight class				Method	Round	Time	Notes
	Akira Kikuchi	def.	Sam Morgan	Submission (Armbar)	1	2:51
	Mitsuhiro Ishida	def.	Yoichi Fukumoto	Decision (Unanimous)	3	5:00
	Daiji Takahashi	def.	Tomohiro Hashi	Decision (Unanimous)	2	5:00
	Toshiteru Ishii	vs.	Takehiro Ishii	Draw	2	5:00
	Keisuke Yamada	def.	Tsuyoshi Irokawa	Decision (Unanimous)	2	5:00
	Yusuke Endo	def.	Heima Hashimoto	Decision (Unanimous)	2	5:00
	Takahiro Hosoi	def.	Yasuji Numa	TKO (Punches)	1	3:01

== Shooto: 3/22 in Korakuen Hall ==
Shooto: 3/22 in Korakuen Hall was an event held on March 22, 2004 at Korakuen Hall in Tokyo, Japan.

=== Results ===
Main Card
Weight class				Method	Round	Time	Notes
	Tatsuya Kawajiri	vs.	Caol Uno	Draw	3	5:00
	Jens Pulver	def.	Naoya Uematsu	KO (Punch)	1	2:09
	Akitoshi Tamura	vs.	Eiji Murayama	Draw	2	5:00
	Shigetoshi Iwase	def.	Yoshifumi Dogaki	KO (Punch)	2	3:39
	Shinichi Kojima	def.	Takeshi Sato	Decision (Unanimous)	2	5:00
	Takeshi Inoue	def.	Yohei Suzuki	TKO (Punches)	1	2:40

== Shooto: Gig Central 5 ==
Shooto: Gig Central 5 was an event held on March 28, 2004 at Nagoya Civic Assembly Hall in Nagoya, Aichi, Japan.

=== Results ===
Main Card
Weight class				Method	Round	Time	Notes
	Ryan Bow	def.	Daisuke Sugie	Decision (Unanimous)	3	5:00
	Ganjo Tentsuku	def.	Naoki Matsushita	Decision (Majority)	2	5:00
	Hatsu Hioki	def.	Yohei Nanbu	Decision (Unanimous)	2	5:00
	Takahiro Kajita	def.	Toshikazu Iseno	KO (Head Kick)	1	4:50
	Kenichi Hattori	vs.	Masaaki Yamamori	Draw	2	5:00
	Atsushi Takeuchi	def.	Takashi Yamamoto	Decision (Majority)	2	5:00
	Hayate Usui	def.	Takeshi Matsushita	Decision (Majority)	2	5:00

== Shooto 2004: 4/11 in Osaka Prefectural Gymnasium ==
Shooto 2004: 4/11 in Osaka Prefectural Gymnasium was an event held on April 11, 2004 at Osaka Prefectural Gymnasium in Osaka, Kansai, Japan.

=== Results ===
Main Card
Weight class				Method	Round	Time	Notes
	Takumi Nakayama	def.	Takashi Nakakura	Decision (Unanimous)	3	5:00
	Junji Ikoma	def.	Ichaku Murata	Submission (Triangle Choke)	2	1:16
	Kenichiro Togashi	def.	Romualdas Klimavicius	Submission (Armbar)	1	2:36
	Tsutomu Shiiki	def.	Seigi Fujioka	Decision (Unanimous)	2	5:00
	Takamitsu Oba	vs.	Keisuke Sakai	Draw	2	5:00
	Koetsu Okazaki	def.	Takao Tamura	Decision (Unanimous)	2	5:00
	Masanori Sugatani	def.	Manabu Kano	Submission (Armbar)	1	1:58

== Shooto 2004: 4/16 in Kitazawa Town Hall ==
Shooto 2004: 4/16 in Kitazawa Town Hall was an event held on April 16, 2004 at Kitazawa Town Hall in Setagaya, Tokyo, Japan.

=== Results ===
Main Card
Weight class				Method	Round	Time	Notes
	Katsuya Toida	def.	Jin Kazeta	Submission (Armbar)	2	4:19
	Akitoshi Hokazono	def.	Kenji Osawa	Submission (Rear-Naked Choke)	1	1:05
	So Tazawa	def.	Takamaro Watari	Decision (Unanimous)	2	5:00
	Toshimichi Akagi	def.	Yutaka Tetsuka	Submission (Rear-Naked Choke)	1	3:19
	Koji Takeuchi	def.	Wataru Miki	Submission (Armbar)	1	4:11
	Ryuhei Sato	def.	Akihiro Murayama	Decision (Unanimous)	2	5:00

== Shooto 2004: 5/3 in Korakuen Hall ==
Shooto 2004: 5/3 in Korakuen Hall was an event held on May 3, 2004 at Korakuen Hall in Tokyo, Japan.

=== Results ===
Main Card
Weight class				Method	Round	Time	Notes
	Akira Kikuchi	def.	Jutaro Nakao	Decision (Majority)	3	5:00
	Hiroyuki Takaya	def.	Stephen Palling	KO (Head Kick)	1	2:11
	Mamoru Yamaguchi	def.	Hiroaki Yoshioka	KO (Knee to the Body)	3	4:41
	Kentaro Imaizumi	def.	Jin Akimoto	Decision (Unanimous)	3	5:00
	Takaharu Murahama	def.	Kenichiro Togashi	Decision (Unanimous)	3	5:00
	Rumina Sato	def.	Erikas Petraitis	Technical Submission (Triangle Choke)	2	2:20
	Takeshi Yamazaki	def.	Antanas Jazbutis	Submission (Armbar)	1	4:10
	Tomonari Kanomata	def.	Takayuki Okochi	Decision (Unanimous)	2	5:00
	Hiroyasu Kodera	def.	Shinichi Hanawa	Decision (Unanimous)	2	5:00
	Yu Shiori	def.	Hisaki Hiraishi	Decision (Unanimous)	2	5:00

== Shooto: Shooto Junkie Is Back! ==
Shooto: Shooto Junkie Is Back! was an event held on June 27, 2004 at Chiba Blue Field in Chiba, Japan.

=== Results ===
Main Card
Weight class				Method	Round	Time	Notes
	Ryota Matsune	def.	Daniel Lima	Decision (Unanimous)	3	5:00
	Naoya Uematsu	def.	Hideki Kadowaki	Technical Submission (Guillotine Choke)	1	0:45
	Masaya Takita	def.	Masato Fujiwara	Decision (Unanimous)	2	5:00
	Tetsu Suzuki	vs.	Shin Kato	Draw	2	5:00
	Nobuyuki Minami	def.	Yasushi Watanabe	Decision (Unanimous)	2	5:00
	Hayato Sato	def.	Kenichi Takeda	Decision (Split)	2	5:00

== Shooto 2004: 7/4 in Kitazawa Town Hall ==
Shooto 2004: 7/4 in Kitazawa Town Hall was an event held on July 4, 2004 at Kitazawa Town Hall in Setagaya, Tokyo, Japan.

=== Results ===
Main Card
Weight class				Method	Round	Time	Notes
	Yoichi Fukumoto	def.	Kohei Yasumi	Decision (Unanimous)	3	5:00
	Ganjo Tentsuku	vs.	Tomonari Kanomata	Draw	2	5:00
	So Tazawa	def.	Kenji Osawa	TKO (Cut)	1	2:33
	Seiki Uchimura	def.	Takahiro Kajita	Decision (Unanimous)	2	5:00
	Takehiro Ishii	vs.	Atsushi Takeuchi	Draw	2	5:00
	Tenkei Oda	def.	Tsuyoshi Irokawa	Decision (Unanimous)	2	5:00
	Kabuto Kokage	def.	Wataru Miki	Decision (Unanimous)	2	5:00
	Kyotaro Nakao	def.	Takeshi Matsushita	Decision (Unanimous)	2	5:00

== Shooto: 7/16 in Korakuen Hall ==
Shooto: 7/16 in Korakuen Hall was an event held on July 16, 2004 at Korakuen Hall in Tokyo, Japan.

=== Results ===
Main Card
Weight class				Method	Round	Time	Notes
	Yasuhiro Urushitani	def.	Junji Ikoma	Decision (Unanimous)	3	5:00
	Joachim Hansen	def.	Gesias Cavalcante	Decision (Majority)	3	5:00
	Ryan Bow	def.	Takumi Nakayama	Decision (Majority)	3	5:00
	Ryuta Sakurai	def.	David Bielkheden	Decision (Unanimous)	3	5:00
	Yusuke Endo	def.	Kenichi Hattori	Decision (Unanimous)	2	5:00
	Takeshi Inoue	def.	Keisuke Yamada	Decision (Unanimous)	2	5:00
	Shinichi Kojima	def.	Kenichi Sawada	Technical Submission (Rear Naked Choke)	2	3:34
	Keita Nakamura	def.	Keisuke Sakai	Submission (Rear Naked Choke)	1	2:20

== Shooto: Gig Central 6 ==
Shooto: Gig Central 6 was an event held on September 12, 2004 at Nagoya Civic Assembly Hall in Nagoya, Aichi, Japan.

=== Results ===
Main Card
Weight class				Method	Round	Time	Notes
	Daisuke Sugie	def.	Saburo Kawakatsu	Decision (Unanimous)	3	5:00
	Hatsu Hioki	def.	Tsutomu Shiiki	Decision (Unanimous)	2	5:00
	Kenji Osawa	def.	Hiroshi Umemura	Decision (Unanimous)	2	5:00
	Akira Kibe	def.	Yasuji Numa	Submission (Armbar)	1	1:48
	Jon Valuri	def.	Yosuke Mikami	TKO	1	1:41
	Takeshi Matsushita	def.	Masanori Sugatani	TKO (Cut)	2	1:03
	Koetsu Okazaki	def.	Takahiro Hosoi	Decision (Majority)	2	5:00
	Kenichi Hattori	def.	Toshikazu Iseno	Decision (Unanimous)	2	5:00

== Shooto: 9/26 in Kourakuen Hall ==
Shooto: 9/26 in Kourakuen Hall was an event held on September 26, 2004 at Korakuen Hall in Tokyo, Japan.

=== Results ===
Main Card
Weight class				Method	Round	Time	Notes
Flyweight	Mamoru Yamaguchi (c)	vs.	Robson Moura	Draw	3	5:00	(Note: For the Flyweight Championship.)
	Kotetsu Boku	def.	Takaharu Murahama	Decision (Unanimous)	3	5:00
	Marcos Galvao	def.	Jin Akimoto	Decision (Unanimous)	3	5:00
	Akira Kikuchi	def.	Ramunas Komas	Submission (Armbar)	2	2:21
	Tatsuya Kawajiri	def.	Mindaugas Laurinaitis	TKO (Punches)	2	2:00
	Taiyo Nakahara	def.	Jin Kazeta	Decision (Unanimous)	2	5:00
	Komei Okada	def.	Koji Takeuchi	Decision (Unanimous)	2	5:00
	So Tazawa	def.	Tetsu Suzuki	Decision (Majority)	2	5:00
	Issei Tsurumi	def.	Hayato Sato	Submission (Kimura)	1	1:21

== Shooto 2004: 10/17 in Osaka Prefectural Gymnasium ==
Shooto 2004: 10/17 in Osaka Prefectural Gymnasium was an event held on October 17, 2004 at Osaka Prefectural Gymnasium in Osaka, Kansai, Japan.

=== Results ===
Main Card
Weight class				Method	Round	Time	Notes
	Takashi Nakakura	def.	Kenichiro Togashi	Decision (Unanimous)	3	5:00
	Akitoshi Hokazono	vs.	Daniel Lima	Draw	3	5:00
	Hirofumi Hara	vs.	Jun Kitagawa	Draw	2	5:00
	Hayate Usui	def.	Seigi Fujioka	Decision (Majority)	2	5:00
	Toshimichi Akagi	def.	Tsuyoshi Okada	Decision (Majority)	2	5:00
	Jyoji Yamaguchi	def.	Takehiro Harusaki	Decision (Unanimous)	2	5:00
	Wataru Miki	def.	Ken Omatsu	Decision (Unanimous)	2	5:00
	Masashi Yozen	def.	Nobuyuki Shimakawa	Decision (Majority)	2	5:00

== Shooto: Wanna Shooto 2004 ==
Shooto: Wanna Shooto 2004 was an event held on November 12, 2004 at Korakuen Hall in Tokyo, Japan.

=== Results ===
Main Card
Weight class				Method	Round	Time	Notes
Bantamweight	Ryota Matsune (c)	def.	Kentaro Imaizumi	Decision (Split)	3	5:00	(Note: For the Bantamweight Championship.)
	Mitsuhiro Ishida	def.	Daisuke Sugie	Decision (Unanimous)	3	5:00
	Justin Bruckmann	def.	Yoichi Fukumoto	Decision (Unanimous)	3	5:00
	Jani Lax	def.	Kohei Yasumi	Submission (Guillotine Choke)	2	3:25
	Danilo Cherman	def.	Takeshi Yamazaki	Decision (Unanimous)	3	5:00
	Daiji Takahashi	def.	Hiroyasu Kodera	Decision (Unanimous)	2	5:00
	Kenji Osawa	def.	Seiji Ozuka	Decision (Unanimous)	2	5:00
	Takeshi Inoue	def.	Hayate Usui	KO (Punch)	2	4:58
	Yusuke Endo	def.	Seiki Uchimura	TKO (Punches)	1	1:42
	Toshimichi Akagi	vs.	Shinichi Kojima	Draw	2	5:00

== Shooto: Rookie Tournament 2004 Final ==
Shooto: Rookie Tournament 2004 Final was an event held on November 25, 2004 at Kitazawa Town Hall in Setagaya, Tokyo, Japan.

=== Results ===
Main Card
Weight class				Method	Round	Time	Notes
	Junji Ikoma	def.	Homare Kuboyama	TKO (Cut)	1	3:57
	Tomonari Kanomata	vs.	Kabuto Kokage	Draw	2	5:00
	Koetsu Okazaki	vs.	So Tazawa	Draw	2	5:00
	Atsushi Takeuchi	def.	Issei Tsurumi	Decision (Unanimous)	2	5:00
	Sakae Kasuya	vs.	Tenkei Oda	Draw	2	5:00
	Takeshi Sato	def.	Yusei Shimokawa	Decision (Unanimous)	2	5:00

== G-Shooto: G-Shooto 01 ==
G-Shooto: G-Shooto 01 was an event held on November 26, 2004 at Zepp Tokyo in Tokyo, Japan.

=== Results ===
Main Card
Weight class				Method	Round	Time	Notes
	Tevi Say	def.	Izumi Noguchi	Submission (Armbar)	2	0:33
	Miku Matsumoto	def.	Chihiro Takahashi	Submission (Armbar)	1	3:48
	Megumi Yabushita	def.	Hitomi Akano	Decision (Unanimous)	2	5:00
	Yuka Kimura	def.	Kyoko Murakami	Decision (Majority)	2	5:00
	Kayo Nagayasu	def.	Akinori Akinori	Decision (Split)	2	5:00
	Yuki Furudate	def.	Ikumi Shibata	Submission (Armbar)	1	3:03
	Akiko Inoue	def.	Ayumi Ayumi	Submission (Triangle Choke)	2	2:51
	Yukiko Seki	def.	Kazumi Sakaguchi	KO	1	2:05

== Shooto: Year End Show 2004 ==
Shooto: Year End Show 2004 was an event held on December 14, 2004 at Yoyogi National Gymnasium in Tokyo, Japan.

=== Results ===
Main Card
Weight class				Method	Round	Time	Notes
Lightweight	Tatsuya Kawajiri	def.	Vítor Ribeiro (c)	TKO (Punches)	2	3:11	(Note: For the Lightweight Championship.)
Welterweight	Akira Kikuchi	def.	Jake Shields (c)	Decision (Unanimous)	3	5:00	(Note: For the Welterweight Championship.)
	Alexandre Franca Nogueira	def.	Hideki Kadowaki	Submission (Guillotine Choke)	1	3:34
	Gilbert Melendez	def.	Hiroyuki Takaya	Decision (Unanimous)	3	5:00
	Rumina Sato	def.	Katsuya Toida	KO (Punch)	2	1:21
	Makoto Ishikawa	def.	Hiroyuki Abe	TKO (Cut)	3	0:40
	Megumi Fujii	def.	Nadia van der Wel	Submission (Armbar)	1	1:43

== See also ==
- Shooto
- List of Shooto champions
- List of Shooto Events
