= Takashi Nakakura =

Japanese mixed martial artist

Takashi Nakakura 中蔵隆志
- Born: March 23, 1977 (age 49)
- Nationality: Japanese
- Height: 5 ft 7 in (1.70 m)
- Weight: 155 lb (70 kg; 11.1 st)
- Division: Lightweight; Featherweight
- Style: Freestyle
- Fighting out of: Osaka, Japan
- Team: Shooto Gym Osaka

Mixed martial arts record
- Total: 16
- Wins: 11
- By knockout: 1
- By submission: 4
- Losses: 4
- By knockout: 2
- By decision: 2
- Draws: 1

Other information
- Mixed martial arts record from Sherdog

Takashi Nakakura (Japanese: 中蔵隆志, Nakakura Takashi, born March 23, 1977) is a Japanese mixed martial artist, and the former Shooto welterweight champion. Nakakura is also a seido kaikan karate and Judo black belt. He took up Judo for three years in high school and soon after started training in seido kaikan karate where he took 2nd in the West Japan B-league competition losing only to Tsuyoshi Nakasako, a current K-1 fighter.

== MMA career ==
Nakakura made his Shooto debut in 2002, in GIG: East 11. He won by submission (rear naked choke) over Heima Hashimoto in a fight that lasted a bit over three minutes. He remained undefeated for two years, until losing by decision to Takumi Nakayama in 2004. On May 3, 2008, he fought Ganjo Tetsuku at Shooto's Tradition 01 event for Shooto's Vacant welterweight championship, which he won by Unanimous Decision.

May 10, 2009 Shooto Tradition Final, Nakakura fought a non-title bout against former Pride Fighting Championships lightweight title holder Takanori Gomi. Although Nakakura was willing stand and strike with Gomi, he was dominated from the opening bell. Takanori Gomi had dropped and stopped the Shooto champion with strikes at 4:42 into the second round. A few months later he vacates his Shooto belt due to eye injury.

== Championships and accomplishments ==
- Shooto
  - Shooto Lightweight Championship (1 Time)
  - Shooto Pacific Rim Welterweight Championship (1 Time)

== Mixed martial arts record ==
Professional record breakdown
16 matches	11 wins	4 losses
By knockout	1	2
By submission	4	0
By decision	6	2
Draws	1	

Res.	Record	Opponent	Method	Event	Date	Round	Time	Location	Notes
Loss	11–4–1	Kuniyoshi Hironaka	Decision (unanimous)	Shooto: Shooto Tradition 2011	April 29, 2011	3	5:00	Tokyo, Japan	
Loss	11–3–1	Takanori Gomi	KO (punches)	Shooto: Shooto Tradition Final	May 10, 2009	2	4:42	Tokyo, Japan	
Win	11–2–1	Bendy Casimir	Submission (rear-naked choke)	Shooto: Shooto Tradition 4	November 29, 2008	1	4:58	Tokyo, Japan	
Win	10–2–1	Ganjo Tentsuku	Decision (unanimous)	Shooto: Shooto Tradition 1	May 3, 2008	3	5:00	Tokyo, Japan	Won vacant Shooto Lightweight Championship. Later vacated after losing non-title fight to Takanori Gomi
Win	9–2–1	Yusuke Endo	Decision (unanimous)	Shooto: Back To Our Roots 6	November 8, 2007	3	5:00	Tokyo, Japan	
Win	8–2–1	Jani Lax	Submission (achilles lock)	Shooto: Back To Our Roots 4	July 15, 2007	1	2:54	Tokyo, Japan	
Win	7–2–1	Mizuto Hirota	Decision (unanimous)	Shooto: Back To Our Roots 1	February 17, 2007	3	5:00	Yokohama Kanagawa, Japan	Won vacant Shooto Pacific Rim Welterweight Championship. Later vacated after winning Shooto Lightweight Championship.
Draw	6–2–1	Ganjo Tentsuku	Draw	Shooto: Champion Carnival	October 14, 2006	3	5:00	Yokohama Kanagawa, Japan	
Loss	6–2	Mitsuhiro Ishida	TKO (cut)	Shooto: Alive Road	August 20, 2005	3	1:31	Yokohama Kanagawa, Japan	
Win	6–1	Ray Cooper	TKO (cut)	Shooto: 5/4 in Korakuen Hall	May 4, 2005	2	1:14	Tokyo, Japan	
Win	5–1	Kenichiro Togashi	Decision (unanimous)	Shooto 2004: 10/17 in Osaka Prefectural Gymnasium	October 17, 2004	3	5:00	Osaka, Japan	Return to Lightweight.
Loss	4–1	Takumi Nakayama	Decision (unanimous)	Shooto 2004: 4/11 in Osaka Prefectural Gymnasium	April 11, 2004	3	5:00	Osaka, Japan	Featherweight debut.
Win	4–0	Saburo Kawakatsu	Decision (unanimous)	Shooto: Gig West 4	October 12, 2003	2	5:00	Osaka, Japan	
Win	3–0	Masato Fujiwara	Submission (triangle choke)	Shooto 2003: 6/27 in Hiroshima Sun Plaza	June 27, 2003	1	3:48	Hiroshima, Japan	
Win	2–0	Masaya Takita	Decision (unanimous)	Shooto: Gig West 3	October 27, 2002	2	5:00	Osaka, Japan	
Win	1–0	Heima Hashimoto	Submission (rear-naked choke)	Shooto: Gig East 11	September 25, 2002	2	3:17	Tokyo, Japan	
