= Kotetsu Boku =

Zainichi Korean fighter (born 1977)

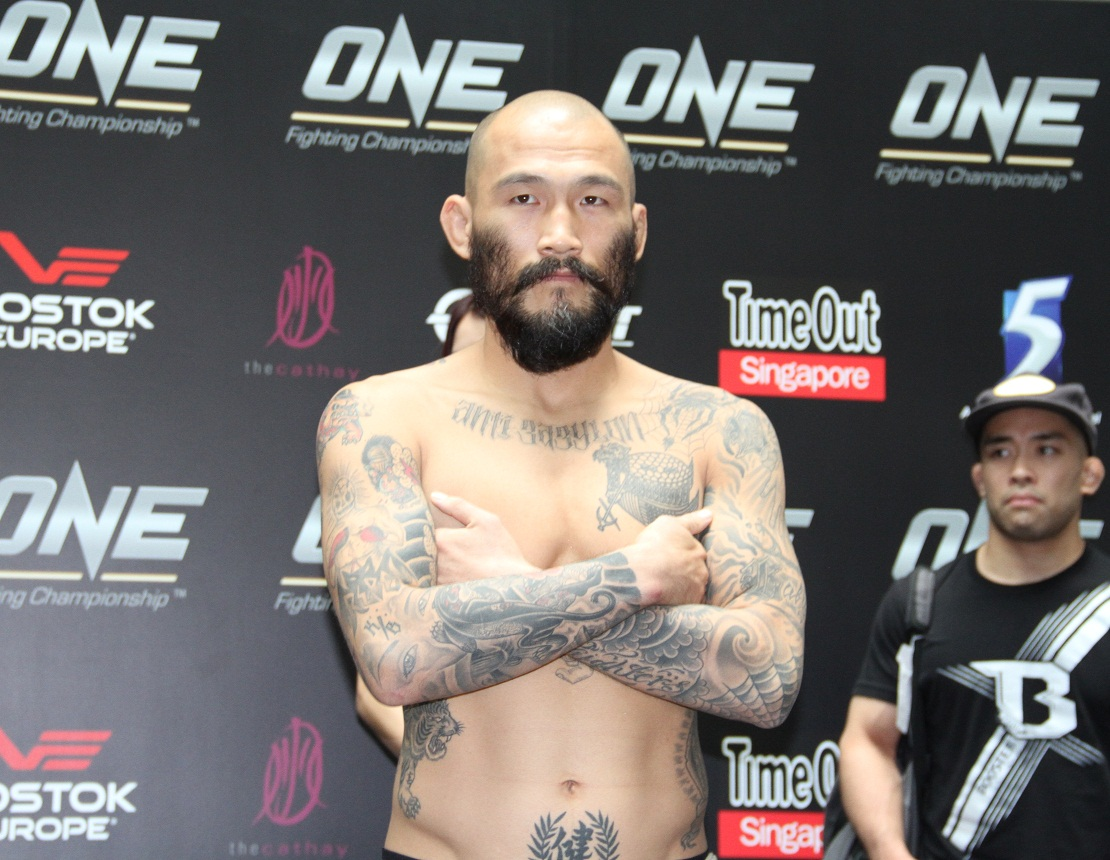
- Born: Park Kwang-cheol; May 27, 1977 (age 49); Shizuoka, Japan
- Native name: 朴光哲 박광철
- Other names: No Face, Korean Tiger
- Nationality: South Korean
- Height: 5 ft 9 in (1.75 m)
- Weight: 145 lb (66 kg; 10.4 st)
- Division: Featherweight; Lightweight; Welterweight
- Style: Kickboxing
- Fighting out of: Shizuoka, Japan
- Team: Krazy Bee; Wajyutsu Keisyukai GODS
- Years active: 2001–2020

Kickboxing record
- Total: 4
- Wins: 1
- Losses: 3

Mixed martial arts record
- Total: 44
- Wins: 26
- By knockout: 13
- By submission: 1
- By decision: 12
- Losses: 16
- By knockout: 3
- By submission: 6
- By decision: 7
- Draws: 2

Other information
- Mixed martial arts record from Sherdog
- Last updated on: January 30, 2011

- Korean name
- Hangul: 박광철
- Hanja: 朴光哲
- RR: Bak Gwangcheol
- MR: Pak Kwangch'ŏl

Park Kwang-cheol (Korean: 박광철; Hanja: 朴光哲), better known by his tsumei, Kotetsu Boku (朴 光哲, Boku Kotetsu), is a retired Japanese-born South Korean mixed martial artist and kickboxer, competing in the Featherweight division of Rizin Fighting Federation. He has mostly fought in Shooto, where he was the Shooto Pacific Rim Welterweight Champion, but has also fought in ONE Championship, DREAM, King of the Cage, S-Cup, Cage Force and K-1 HERO'S. Boku is also a former ONE Lightweight World Champion.

== Career ==
=== Shooto ===
Boku made his professional debut against Dutch fighter Marc Duncan at Shooto: GIG East 7 on November 26, 2001, and won by submission in the second round. He also won his next two fights, against Takuhito Hida and Mitsuo Matsumoto, before losing to Takaharu Murahama at Shooto: Treasure Hunt 6 on May 5, 2002. He won his next fight against Toniko Junior, but again suffered a setback by losing the following two fights against Mitsuhiro Ishida and Kenichiro Togashi. Boku then had another four fights in Shooto, winning all four, before transferring to K-1 Hero's in 2005. He was the Shooto Pacific Rim Welterweight Champion, but vacated his title when he left for K-1 Hero's.

=== K-1 HERO'S ===
Boku's K-1 HERO'S debut came against Brazil's former WEC Lightweight Champion Hermes Franca at HERO'S 3 on September 7, 2005, and he won by majority decision. His next, and last, K-1 HERO'S bout took place on August 5, 2006 at HERO'S 6 against Alexandre Franca Nogueira. He also won this, by unanimous decision. After this, Boku returned to Shooto for one fight, a draw against Kenichiro Togashi at Shooto: Back to Our Roots 1. He then joined Greatest Common Multiple in 2007.

=== Cage Force ===
Finland's Jarkko Latomaki was Boku's first opponent in Cage Force. They faced each other at GCM: Cage Force 2 on March 17, 2007, and Boku came away the victor after knocking Latomaki out with an elbow in the first round. He then fought at Cage Force 3, 4 and 5, winning all but one fight which he lost to Artur Oumakhanov. After this, he went into DREAM for one fight. It was a loss to Joachim Hansen at the DREAM Lightweight Grand Prix 2008 Opening Round on March 15, 2008.

=== Return to Shooto ===
2009 saw Boku return to Shooto. His first fight was against then-Shooto Lightweight Champion Yusuke Endo in a non-title fight on January 18, and ended in a draw. He then fought Yutaka Ueda, and won, before taking on Endo again in a rematch which was a title-challenge this time. This took place at Revolutionary Exchanges 2 on September 22, and Boku was submitted in the first round. He then took on Yukio Sakaguchi at Revolutionary Exchanges 3 and won by TKO in round 1.

=== ONE Championship ===
On September 18 it was announced that Boku had signed with the Singapore-based ONE Championship and would be fighting Zorobabel Moreira for the ONE FC Lightweight Championship at ONE Fighting Championship: Rise of Kings. Boku faced Zorobabel Moreira for the inaugural ONE FC Lightweight Championship on October 6, 2012. Boku managed to endure vicious leg kicks throughout the majority of the fight to eventually earn an upset comeback TKO over Moreira early in the third round.

Boku lost his ONE FC Lightweight Championship to Shinya Aoki at ONE Fighting Championship: Kings and Champions on April 5, 2013. Aoki fought to avenge his Evolve MMA teammate Moreira, and forced Boku to submit at 2:01 during round 2 with a rear-naked choke.

Boku faced Arnaud Lepont at ONE FC 14 on March 14, 2014. He won the fight via TKO in the first round.

=== Rizin Fighting Federation ===
On February 24, 2020, it was revealed that Boku had signed with Rizin Fighting Federation. He made his Rizin debut against Jin Aoi at Rizin 23, where lost by unanimous decision. Boku was next scheduled to face Rikuto Shirakawa at Rizin 25. He lost to Shirakawa via third-round technical knockout and subsequently retired from the sport.

== Championships and accomplishments ==
- Shooto
  - Shooto Welterweight Pacific Rim Championship (One time)
- ONE Championship
  - ONE Lightweight World Championship (One time, first)

== Personal life ==
Boku is also a tattoo artist and has a tiger and turtle ship tattooed on his torso. He is a vegan.

A Zainichi Korean originally of ancestral Joseon citizenship, Boku acquired South Korean nationality in 2004.

== Mixed martial arts record ==
Professional record breakdown
44 matches	26 wins	16 losses
By knockout	13	3
By submission	1	6
By decision	12	7
Draws	2	

Res.	Record	Opponent	Method	Event	Date	Round	Time	Location	Notes
Loss	26–16–2	Rikuto Shirakawa	TKO (punch and soccer kick)	Rizin 25 – Osaka	November 21, 2020	3	4:19	Osaka, Japan	
Loss	26–15–2	Jin Aoi	Decision (unanimous)	Rizin 23	August 10, 2020	3	5:00	Yokohama, Japan	
Loss	26–14–2	Thanh Le	KO (punches)	ONE: Dreams of Gold	August 16, 2019	1	1:28	Bangkok, Thailand	
Loss	26–13–2	Bruno Pucci	Submission (rear-naked choke)	ONE: Eternal Glory	January 19, 2019	1	3:32	Jakarta, Indonesia	
Loss	26–12–2	Christian Lee	KO (slam)	ONE: Warriors of the World	December 9, 2017	1	3:24	Bangkok, Thailand	
Win	26–11–2	Eric Kelly	TKO (punches)	ONE: Kings & Conquerors	August 5, 2017	3	3:27	Macau, SAR, China	
Win	25–11–2	Timofey Nastyukhin	TKO (doctor stoppage)	ONE: Defending Honor	November 11, 2016	1	5:00	Kallang, Singapore	
Loss	24–11–2	Jadamba Narantungalag	Technical Submission (Von Flue choke)	ONE: Ascent To Power	May 6, 2016	3	1:27	Kallang, Singapore	
Win	24–10–2	Vincent Latoel	TKO (elbows and punches)	ONE: Tribe of Warriors	February 20, 2016	2	4:04	Jakarta, Indonesia	
Win	23–10–2	Major Overall	TKO (punch)	ONE: Pride of Lions	November 13, 2015	2	1:19	Kallang, Singapore	
Win	22–10–2	Juntaro Ushiku	KO (elbows)	Pancrase 67	May 31, 2015	2	4:49	Tokyo, Japan	Featherweight debut.
Loss	21–10–2	Eduard Folayang	Decision (unanimous)	ONE FC: Rise of Heroes	May 2, 2014	3	5:00	Pasay, Philippines	
Win	21–9–2	Arnaud Lepont	KO (punches)	ONE FC: War of Nations	March 14, 2014	1	4:06	Kuala Lumpur, Malaysia	
Loss	20–9–2	Vuyisile Colossa	Decision (unanimous)	ONE FC: Champions and Warriors	September 13, 2013	3	5:00	Jakarta, Indonesia	
Loss	20–8–2	Shinya Aoki	Submission (rear-naked choke)	ONE FC: Kings and Champions	April 5, 2013	2	2:01	Kallang, Singapore	Lost the ONE FC Lightweight Championship.
Win	20–7–2	Zorobabel Moreira	TKO (punches)	ONE FC: Rise of Kings	October 6, 2012	3	0:31	Kallang, Singapore	Won the inaugural ONE FC Lightweight Championship.
Win	19–7–2	Shin Kochiwa	KO (punch)	Shooto: 8th Round	July 16, 2012	1	1:07	Tokyo, Japan	
Loss	18–7–2	Kuniyoshi Hironaka	Decision (unanimous)	Shooto: Shootor's Legacy 3	July 18, 2011	3	5:00	Tokyo, Japan	For the vacant Shooto Welterweight Championship.
Win	18–6–2	Yukinari Tamura	Decision (unanimous)	Shooto: Shootor's Legacy 1	January 10, 2011	3	5:00	Tokyo, Japan	
Win	17–6–2	Yoshihiro Koyama	Decision (unanimous)	Shooto: The Way of Shooto 3: Like a Tiger, Like a Dragon	May 30, 2010	3	5:00	Tokyo, Japan	
Win	16–6–2	Tony Hervey	Decision (unanimous)	KOTC: Toryumon	January 30, 2010	3	5:00	Okinawa, Japan	
Win	15–6–2	Yukio Sakaguchi	KO (punch)	Shooto: Revolutionary Exchanges 3	November 23, 2009	1	1:54	Tokyo, Japan	
Loss	14–6–2	Yusuke Endo	Submission (rear-naked choke)	Shooto: Revolutionary Exchanges 2	September 22, 2009	1	3:17	Tokyo, Japan	For the Shooto Welterweight Championship.
Win	14–5–2	Yutaka Ueda	TKO (punches)	Shooto: Shooto Tradition Final	May 10, 2009	1	4:56	Tokyo, Japan	
Draw	13–5–2	Yusuke Endo	Draw (majority)	Shooto: Shooto Tradition 5	January 18, 2009	3	5:00	Tokyo, Japan	
Loss	13–5–1	Joachim Hansen	Decision (unanimous)	Dream 1: Lightweight Grand Prix 2008 First Round	March 15, 2008	2	5:00	Saitama, Japan	
Loss	13–4–1	Artur Oumakhanov	Decision (split)	GCM: Cage Force 5	December 1, 2007	3	5:00	Tokyo, Japan	
Win	13–3–1	Eiji Mitsuoka	Decision (split)	GCM: Cage Force 4	September 8, 2007	3	5:00	Tokyo, Japan	
Win	12–3–1	David Gardner	Decision (unanimous)	GCM: Cage Force 3	June 9, 2007	3	5:00	Tokyo, Japan	
Win	11–3–1	Jarkko Latomaki	TKO (punches and elbows)	GCM: Cage Force 2	March 17, 2007	1	2:33	Tokyo, Japan	
Draw	10–3–1	Kenichiro Togashi	Draw (split)	Shooto: Back To Our Roots 1	February 17, 2007	3	5:00	Yokohama, Japan	
Win	10–3	Alexandre Franca Nogueira	Decision (unanimous)	HERO'S 6	August 5, 2006	2	5:00	Tokyo, Japan	
Win	9–3	Hermes França	Decision (majority)	HERO'S 3	September 7, 2005	2	5:00	Tokyo, Japan	
Win	8–3	Ryan Bow	Decision (majority)	Shooto: 1/29 in Korakuen Hall	January 29, 2005	3	5:00	Tokyo, Japan	Won the Shooto Pacific Rim Welterweight Championship.
Win	7-3	Takaharu Murahama	Decision (Unanimous)	Shooto: 9/26 in Kourakuen Hall	September 26, 2004	3	5:00	Tokyo, Japan	
Win	6-3	Kohei Yasumi	Decision (unanimous)	Shooto 2004: 1/24 in Korakuen Hall	January 24, 2004	3	5:00	Tokyo, Japan	
Win	5–3	Naoki Matsushita	TKO (punches)	Shooto: Gig Central 4	September 21, 2003	2	1:15	Nagoya, Japan	
Loss	4–3	Kenichiro Togashi	Submission (armbar)	Shooto 2003: 6/27 in Hiroshima Sun Plaza	June 27, 2003	1	2:48	Hiroshima, Japan	
Loss	4–2	Mitsuhiro Ishida	Decision (unanimous)	Shooto: 2/6 in Kitazawa Town Hall	February 6, 2003	2	5:00	Tokyo, Japan	
Win	4–1	Toniko Junior	TKO (punches)	Shooto: Treasure Hunt 8	July 19, 2002	1	4:50	Tokyo, Japan	
Loss	3–1	Takaharu Murahama	Submission (kneebar)	Shooto: Treasure Hunt 6	May 5, 2002	2	3:17	Tokyo, Japan	
Win	3–0	Mitsuo Matsumoto	Decision (unanimous)	Shooto: Treasure Hunt 4	March 13, 2002	2	5:00	Tokyo, Japan	
Win	2–0	Takuhito Hida	Decision (unanimous)	Shooto: Treasure Hunt 2	January 25, 2002	2	5:00	Tokyo, Japan	
Win	1–0	Marc Duncan	Submission (armbar)	Shooto: Gig East 7	November 26, 2001	2	3:15	Tokyo, Japan	

== Kickboxing record ==
1 Win (0 (T) KO's, 1 decision), 3 Losses
Date	Result	Record	Opponent	Event	Method	Round	Time
July 20, 2005	Loss	1-3	(Japan) Akeomi Nitta	K-1 World MAX 2005 Championship Final, Yokohama, Japan	Decision (Unanimous)	3	3:00
May 4, 2005	Loss	1-2	(Canada) Sam Stout	K-1 World MAX 2005 World Tournament Open, Tokyo, Japan	Decision (Unanimous)	4	3:00
April 2, 2000	Loss	1-1	(Japan) Humio Yoshikawa	K-2000 Monster Challenge Final, Japan	Decision	1	3:00
April 2, 2000	Win	1-0	(Japan) Hiroki Ryu	K-2000 Monster Challenge Semi-Final, Japan	Decision	1	2:00

== See also ==
- List of current ONE fighters
