= Koetsu Okazaki =

Japanese mixed martial artist

Koetsu Okazaki 岡嵜康悦
- Born: July 3, 1979 (age 47); Osaka, Osaka, Japan
- Nationality: Japanese
- Height: 5 ft 7 in (1.70 m)
- Weight: 135 lb (61 kg; 9.6 st)
- Division: Bantamweight
- Style: Judo, Karate, Shootboxing
- Fighting out of: Osaka, Japan
- Team: Nakanoshima MMA Academy
- Years active: 2004-present

Mixed martial arts record
- Total: 15
- Wins: 10
- By knockout: 3
- By submission: 1
- By decision: 6
- Losses: 4
- By submission: 1
- By decision: 3
- Draws: 1

Other information
- Mixed martial arts record from Sherdog

Koetsu Okazaki Japanese: 岡嵜康悦 (born March 7, 1979) is a Japanese mixed martial artist who currently competes in the Bantamweight division for ONE Championship. A professional competitor since 2004, Okazaki has also formerly competed for Shooto and is the former Shooto Featherweight Champion as well as the former Shooto Pacific Rim Featherweight Champion.

== Mixed martial arts career ==
=== Shooto ===
Okazaki won the 2004 Shooto rookie tournament in 2004 and then disappeared for 18 months before returning with back-to-back wins over Hiroyuki Tanaka and So Tazawa in front of his hometown Osaka crowd, earning his Class A Shooto license, and firmly planting himself in the minds of Shooto fans while intensifying the 132-pound class.

On October 18, 2009 Okazaki won Shooto's vacant 132-pound Pacific Rim Championship in the main event of Shooto GIG Tokyo 3 at Shinjuku FACE by beating Hiromasa Ogikubo via second-round TKO.

Okazaki won the Shooto 132-Pound World Championship at Shooto Tradition 2011 on April 29, 2011 at Tokyo Dome City Hall when he defeated Shuichiro Katsumura by TKO (punches).

On May 18, 2012 Okazaki made the first defence of his Shooto 132-Pound World Championship in a rematch with Ogikubo but was submitted in the third round.

=== ONE FC ===
On April 10, 2013 it was announced that Okazaki had signed with ONE Fighting Championship. He faced Bibiano Fernandes for the Interim ONE FC Bantamweight Championship at ONE FC: 'Rise to Power' at the SM Mall of Asia Arena in Manila on May 31. He lost the fight via unanimous decision.

== Championships and accomplishments ==
- Shooto
  - Shooto Featherweight Championship (One time)
  - Shooto Rookie Featherweight Championship (One time)
  - Shooto PRO Featherweight Championship (One time)

== Mixed martial arts record ==
Professional record breakdown
15 matches	10 wins	4 losses
By knockout	3	0
By submission	1	1
By decision	6	3
Draws	1	

Res.	Record	Opponent	Method	Event	Date	Round	Time	Location	Notes
Loss	10–4–1	Kevin Belingon	Decision (unanimous)	ONE FC: Warrior's Way	December 5, 2014	3	5:00	Pasay, Philippines	
Win	10–3–1	Yusup Saadulaev	TKO (punches)	ONE FC: War of Dragons	July 11, 2014	2	4:21	Taipei, Taiwan	
Win	9–3–1	Joshua Alvarez	Submission (rear-naked choke)	ONE FC: Moment of Truth	December 6, 2013	2	3:13	Pasay, Philippines	
Loss	8–3–1	Bibiano Fernandes	Decision (unanimous)	ONE FC: Rise to Power	May 31, 2013	5	5:00	Pasay, Philippines	For ONE FC Interim Bantamweight Championship
Loss	8–2–1	Hiromasa Ougikubo	Submission (rear-naked choke)	Shooto: 5th Round	May 18, 2012	3	3:32	Tokyo, Japan	
Win	8–1–1	Shuichiro Katsumura	TKO (punches)	Shooto: Shooto Tradition 2011	April 29, 2011	2	2:24	Tokyo, Japan	
Win	7–1–1	Tetsu Suzuki	Decision (unanimous)	Shooto: The Way of Shooto 4: Like a Tiger, Like a Dragon	July 19, 2010	3	5:00	Tokyo, Japan	
Win	6–1–1	Hiromasa Ougikubo	TKO (punches)	Shooto: Gig Tokyo 3	October 18, 2009	2	2:08	Tokyo, Japan	
Loss	5–1–1	Masakatsu Ueda	Decision (unanimous)	Shooto: Back To Our Roots 8	March 28, 2008	3	5:00	Tokyo, Japan	
Win	5–0–1	Atsushi Yamamoto	Decision (majority)	Shooto: Back To Our Roots 3	May 18, 2007	3	5:00	Tokyo, Japan	
Win	4–0–1	So Tazawa	Decision (unanimous)	Shooto: Gig West 6	Nov 4, 2006	3	5:00	Osaka, Japan	
Win	3–0–1	Hiroyuki Tanaka	Decision (majority)	Shooto: Gig West 5	June 3, 2006	3	5:00	Osaka, Japan	
Draw	2–0–1	So Tazawa	Draw	Shooto: Rookie Tournament 2004 Final	Nov 25, 2004	2	5:00	Setagaya, Japan	
Win	2–0	Takahiro Hosoi	Decision (majority)	Shooto: Gig Central 6	Sep 12, 2004	2	5:00	Nagoya, Japan	
Win	1–0	Takao Tamura	Decision (unanimous)	Shooto 2004: 4/11 in Osaka Prefectural Gymnasium	April 11, 2004	2	5:00	Osaka, Japan	
