= Eiji Mitsuoka =

Japanese mixed martial arts fighter

Eiji Mitsuoka 光岡映二
- Born: January 1, 1976 (age 50); Handa, Aichi, Japan
- Other names: Kanaami no Mōshigo (The Heaven-sent Child of the Cage)
- Nationality: Japanese
- Height: 5 ft 7 in (1.70 m)
- Weight: 145 lb (66 kg; 10.4 st)
- Division: Welterweight; Lightweight; Featherweight
- Reach: 68 in (173 cm)
- Stance: Orthodox
- Fighting out of: Saitama Prefecture
- Team: Wajyutsu Keisyukai RJW
- Years active: 2001-2012

Mixed martial arts record
- Total: 29
- Wins: 18
- By knockout: 4
- By submission: 10
- By decision: 4
- Losses: 9
- By knockout: 3
- By submission: 2
- By decision: 4
- Draws: 2

Other information
- Mixed martial arts record from Sherdog

Eiji Mitsuoka (Japanese: 光岡 映二, Mitsuoka Eiji; born January 1, 1976) is a retired Japanese professional mixed martial artist. A professional competitor from 2001 until 2012, Mitsuoka fought for the UFC, DREAM, World Victory Road, PRIDE, Shooto, Cage Force, DEEP and King of the Cage promotions. Mitsuoka's nickname Kanaami no Mōshigo (金網の申し子), which translates as "The Heaven-sent Child of the Cage" was given in reference to his earlier career in King of the Cage and his performance in Cage Force.

== Mixed martial arts career ==
=== Ultimate Fighting Championship ===
Mitsuoka made his UFC debut replacing an injured George Sotiropoulos against Takanori Gomi on February 26, 2012 at UFC 144. He lost the fight via TKO in the second round.

Mitsuoka faced Nik Lentz in his Featherweight debut on August 11, 2012 at UFC 150. He lost the fight via first round TKO and was subsequently released from the promotion.

== Mixed martial arts record ==
Professional record breakdown
29 matches	18 wins	9 losses
By knockout	4	3
By submission	10	2
By decision	4	4
Draws	2	

Res.	Record	Opponent	Method	Event	Date	Round	Time	Location	Notes
Loss	18–9–2	Nik Lentz	TKO (punches)	UFC 150	August 11, 2012	1	3:45	Denver, Colorado, United States	Featherweight debut.
Loss	18–8–2	Takanori Gomi	TKO (punches)	UFC 144	February 26, 2012	2	2:21	Saitama, Japan	
Win	18–7–2	Bruno Carvalho	Decision (unanimous)	Dream: Japan GP Final	July 16, 2011	2	5:00	Tokyo, Japan	
Win	17–7–2	Jung Gyeong Lee	Submission (punches)	Deep: 53 Impact	April 22, 2011	1	3:50	Tokyo, Japan	
Loss	16–7–2	Kazunori Yokota	Decision (unanimous)	World Victory Road Presents: Sengoku 11	November 7, 2009	3	5:00	Tokyo, Japan	
Win	16–6–2	Clay French	Submission (guillotine choke)	World Victory Road Presents: Sengoku 9	August 2, 2009	1	1:51	Saitama, Saitama, Japan	
Win	15–6–2	Sergey Golyaev	Submission (armbar)	World Victory Road Presents: Sengoku no Ran 2009	January 4, 2009	1	4:22	Saitama, Saitama, Japan	
Loss	14–6–2	Satoru Kitaoka	Submission (heel hook)	World Victory Road Presents: Sengoku 6	November 1, 2008	1	1:16	Saitama, Saitama, Japan	
Win	14–5–2	Rodrigo Damm	Submission (rear-naked choke)	World Victory Road Presents: Sengoku 4	August 24, 2008	1	3:13	Saitama, Saitama, Japan	
Win	13–5–2	Kwang Hee Lee	Submission (rear-naked choke)	World Victory Road Presents: Sengoku 2	May 18, 2008	1	4:15	Tokyo, Japan	
Win	12–5–2	Joachim Hansen	Decision (majority)	Shooto: Back To Our Roots 6	November 8, 2007	3	5:00	Tokyo, Japan	
Loss	11–5–2	Kotetsu Boku	Decision (unanimous)	GCM: Cage Force 4	September 8, 2007	3	5:00	Tokyo, Japan	
Win	11–4–2	Takumi Nakayama	TKO (punches)	GCM: Cage Force 3	June 9, 2007	1	3:30	Tokyo, Japan	
Win	10–4–2	Brian Cobb	Submission (guillotine choke)	GCM: Cage Force 2	March 17, 2007	3	1:38	Tokyo, Japan	
Win	9–4–2	Danilo Zanolini	Submission (armbar)	GCM: Cage Force 1	November 25, 2006	1	1:23	Tokyo, Japan	
Win	8–4–2	Paul Rodriguez	Submission (guillotine choke)	GCM: D.O.G. 7	September 9, 2006	2	0:40	Tokyo, Japan	
Loss	7–4–2	Vítor Ribeiro	Decision (unanimous)	MARS	February 4, 2006	3	5:00	Tokyo, Japan	150 lbs bout.
Win	7–3–2	Samy Schiavo	Submission (rear naked choke)	GCM: D.O.G. 3	September 17, 2005	1	2:12	Tokyo, Japan	
Loss	6–3–2	Nick Agallar	Decision (unanimous)	GCM: D.O.G. 2	June 11, 2005	3	5:00	Tokyo, Japan	
Win	6–2–2	Shigetoshi Iwase	TKO (punches)	GCM: Demolition 040919	September 19, 2004	1	4:16	Tokyo, Japan	
Draw	5–2–2	Kyosuke Sasaki	Draw	PRIDE Bushido 4	July 19, 2004	2	5:00	Aichi Prefecture, Japan	Return to Lightweight (160 lbs).
Loss	5–2–1	Chris Brennan	Submission (kimura)	PRIDE Bushido 1	October 5, 2003	1	4:31	Saitama, Saitama, Japan	
Win	5–1–1	Gleison Tibau	TKO (corner stoppage)	DEEP: 11th Impact	July 13, 2003	2	3:41	Osaka, Japan	
Win	4–1–1	Zuli Silawanto	Submission (rear naked choke)	TPI Fighting Championship 11	January 31, 2003	1	1:43	Indonesia	
Win	3–1–1	Scott Bills	Decision (unanimous)	PRIDE FC: The Best, Vol. 3	October 20, 2002	2	5:00	Tokyo, Japan	
Loss	2–1–1	John Alessio	TKO (cut)	PRIDE The Best Vol.2	July 20, 2002	2	3:13	Tokyo, Japan	
Win	2–0–1	Anthony Macias	Decision (unanimous)	PRIDE The Best Vol.1	February 22, 2002	2	5:00	Tokyo, Japan	
Draw	1–0–1	Betiss Mansouri	Draw	KOTC 11: Domination	September 29, 2001	3	5:00	San Jacinto, California, United States	Welterweight debut; Mitsuoka had a point deducted for eye gouging.
Win	1–0	Gerald Strebendt	TKO (submission to punches)	KOTC 9: Showtime	June 23, 2001	1	2:23	San Jacinto, California, United States	
