= Mitsuhiro Ishida =

Japanese martial artist

Mitsuhiro Ishida 石田光洋
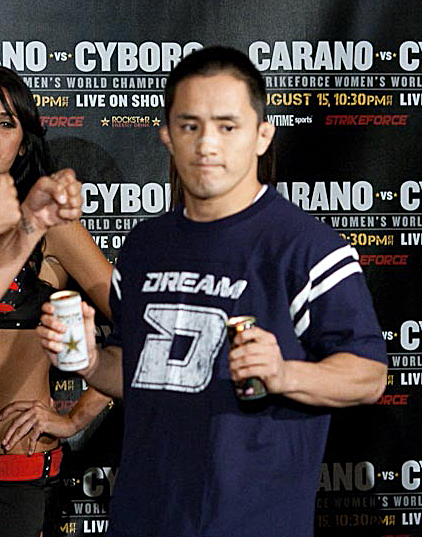
- Mitsuhiro Ishida in 2009, at the weigh-in before the Strikeforce: Carano vs. Cyborg event
- Born: December 29, 1978 (age 47); Tsukuba, Ibaraki, Japan
- Other names: The Endless Warrior
- Nationality: Japanese
- Height: 5 ft 6 in (1.68 m)
- Weight: 143.2 lb (65.0 kg; 10.23 st)
- Division: Featherweight; Lightweight
- Style: MMA, Shooto, Wrestling, Greco-Roman wrestling
- Stance: Orthodox
- Fighting out of: Tokyo, Japan
- Team: T-Blood
- Years active: 2001–2011

Mixed martial arts record
- Total: 29
- Wins: 20
- By knockout: 3
- By submission: 2
- By decision: 15
- Losses: 8
- By knockout: 4
- By submission: 1
- By decision: 3
- Draws: 1

Other information
- Mixed martial arts record from Sherdog

Mitsuhiro Ishida (Japanese: 石田光洋, born December 29, 1978) is a retired Japanese mixed martial artist who competed in Shooto, Strikeforce, PRIDE, DREAM, and DEEP. A professional competitor from 2001 until 2011, Ishida also participated in the Yarennoka event in the Saitama Super Arena in Japan.

== Background ==
Originally from the Ibaraki Prefecture in Japan, Ishida was a talented wrestler, ranking in the top five nationally during his high school years for the Greco-Roman category.

== Mixed martial arts career ==
=== Early career ===
Ishida's professional debut was on July 6, 2001 at Shooto: To the Top 6 against Daisuke Sugie where he lost via unanimous decision. He then went on to win his next four fights. On February 17, 2006 he defeated Kenichiro Togashi to become the Shooto Pacific Rim Welterweight Champion.

=== PRIDE ===
Ishida won his first four fights in the PRIDE organization, defeating fighters such as Marcus Aurelio and Cristiano Marcello.

At PRIDE Shockwave 2006 he lost to Takanori Gomi in a non-title fight on December 31, 2006, his first defeat in that organization. As a result of the loss to Gomi, he was unable to defend his Shooto Pacific Rim Welterweight Championship at a mandatory title defense in February 2007.

=== Yarennoka! ===
At Yarennoka!, Ishida handed future Strikeforce Lightweight Champion Gilbert Melendez his first loss, in a unanimous decision.

=== Strikeforce ===
Ishida made his United States mainland debut at Strikeforce: Playboy Mansion defeating Justin Wilcox by armbar.

=== DREAM ===
On March 15, 2008, Ishida competed in the opening round of the DREAM Lightweight Grand Prix, defeating Korean judoka Jung Bu-Kyung. He proceeded to lose to Caol Uno in the quarter-finals at DREAM 3 via rear- naked choke submission.

Ishida then defeated Daisuke Nakamura at DREAM 7.

Following matches in Shooto and Strikeforce, Ishida returned to the organization at DREAM 15, where he defeated Daiki Hata.

== Retirement ==
On July 6, 2012 Ishida announced that he has retired from mixed martial arts competition.

== Championships and Accomplishments ==
- Shooto
  - Shooto Pacific Rim Welterweight Championship (1 time)

== Mixed martial arts record ==
Professional record breakdown
29 matches	20 wins	8 losses
By knockout	3	4
By submission	2	1
By decision	15	3
Draws	1	

Res.	Record	Opponent	Method	Event	Date	Round	Time	Location	Notes
Loss	20–8–1	Doo Ho Choi	KO (knee and punches)	DEEP: 56 Impact	December 16, 2011	1	1:33	Tokyo, Japan	
Loss	20–7–1	Joachim Hansen	Decision (split)	DREAM: Fight for Japan!	May 29, 2011	2	5:00	Saitama, Japan	
Win	20–6–1	Akiyo Nishiura	Decision (split)	DREAM 16	September 25, 2010	2	5:00	Nagoya, Japan	
Win	19–6–1	Daiki Hata	Decision (unanimous)	DREAM 15	July 10, 2010	2	5:00	Saitama, Japan	Featherweight debut.
Loss	18–6–1	Gilbert Melendez	TKO (punches)	Strikeforce: Carano vs. Cyborg	August 15, 2009	3	3:16	San Jose, California, United States	For Strikeforce Interim Lightweight Championship.
Loss	18–5–1	Mizuto Hirota	TKO (punches)	Shooto: Shooto Tradition Final	May 10, 2009	1	1:33	Tokyo, Japan	
Win	18–4–1	Daisuke Nakamura	Decision (unanimous)	DREAM 7	March 8, 2009	2	5:00	Saitama, Japan	
Win	17–4–1	Justin Wilcox	Submission (armbar)	Strikeforce: At The Mansion II	September 20, 2008	1	1:29	Beverly Hills, California, United States	
Loss	16–4–1	Caol Uno	Submission (rear-naked choke)	DREAM 3: Lightweight Grand Prix 2008 Second Round	May 11, 2008	2	1:39	Saitama, Japan	Quarterfinal Round of DREAM Lightweight Grand Prix.
Win	16–3–1	Bu Kyung Jung	Decision (unanimous)	DREAM 1: Lightweight Grand Prix 2008 First Round	March 15, 2008	2	5:00	Saitama, Japan	Opening Round of DREAM Lightweight Grand Prix.
Win	15–3–1	Gilbert Melendez	Decision (unanimous)	Yarennoka	December 31, 2007	2	5:00	Saitama, Japan	
Loss	14–3–1	Takanori Gomi	TKO (soccer kick and punches)	PRIDE FC: Shockwave 2006	December 31, 2006	1	1:14	Saitama, Japan	
Win	14–2–1	David Bielkheden	Decision (unanimous)	PRIDE Bushido 13	November 5, 2006	2	5:00	Yokohama, Japan	
Win	13–2–1	Cristiano Marcello	Decision (unanimous)	PRIDE Bushido 12	August 26, 2006	2	5:00	Nagoya, Japan	
Win	12–2–1	Marcus Aurélio	Decision (unanimous)	PRIDE Bushido 11	June 4, 2006	2	5:00	Saitama, Japan	
Win	11–2–1	Paul Rodriguez	Submission (guillotine choke)	PRIDE Bushido 10	April 2, 2006	1	2:29	Tokyo, Japan	
Win	10–2–1	Kenichiro Togashi	Decision (majority)	Shooto: The Victory of the Truth	February 17, 2006	3	5:00	Tokyo, Japan	Won Shooto Pacific Rim Welterweight Championship.
Win	9–2–1	Takashi Nakakura	TKO (cut)	Shooto: Alive Road	August 20, 2005	3	1:31	Yokohama, Japan	
Win	8–2–1	Shinya Sato	TKO (knees and punches)	GCM: D.O.G. 1	March 12, 2005	1	3:03	Tokyo, Japan	
Win	7–2–1	Daisuke Sugie	Decision (unanimous)	Shooto: Wanna Shooto 2004	November 12, 2004	3	5:00	Tokyo, Japan	
Loss	6–2–1	Vítor Ribeiro	Decision (unanimous)	Shooto Hawaii: Soljah Fight Night	July 9, 2004	3	5:00	Honolulu, Hawaii, United States	
Win	6–1–1	Yoichi Fukumoto	Decision (unanimous)	Shooto: 3/4 in Kitazawa Town Hall	March 4, 2004	3	5:00	Tokyo, Japan	
Win	5–1–1	Takayuki Okochi	Decision (unanimous)	Shooto 2004: 1/24 in Korakuen Hall	January 24, 2004	2	5:00	Tokyo, Japan	
Draw	4–1–1	Naoki Matsushita	Draw	Shooto: 7/13 in Korakuen Hall	July 13, 2003	2	5:00	Tokyo, Japan	
Win	4–1	Kotetsu Boku	Decision (unanimous)	Shooto: 2/6 in Kitazawa Town Hall	February 6, 2003	2	5:00	Tokyo, Japan	
Win	3–1	Masakazu Kuramochi	Decision (unanimous)	Shooto: Treasure Hunt 1	January 12, 2002	2	5:00	Tokyo, Japan	
Win	2–1	Naoto Kojima	TKO (punches)	Shooto: Gig East 7	November 26, 2001	2	1:58	Tokyo, Japan	
Win	1–1	Hiroki Kotani	Decision (unanimous)	Shooto: To The Top 9	September 27, 2001	2	5:00	Tokyo, Japan	
Loss	0–1	Daisuke Sugie	Decision (unanimous)	Shooto: To The Top 6	July 6, 2001	2	5:00	Tokyo, Japan	

== See also ==
- List of male mixed martial artists
