= Yonago Industrial Gymnasium =

Arena

Coordinates: 35°27′10″N 133°20′54.3″E

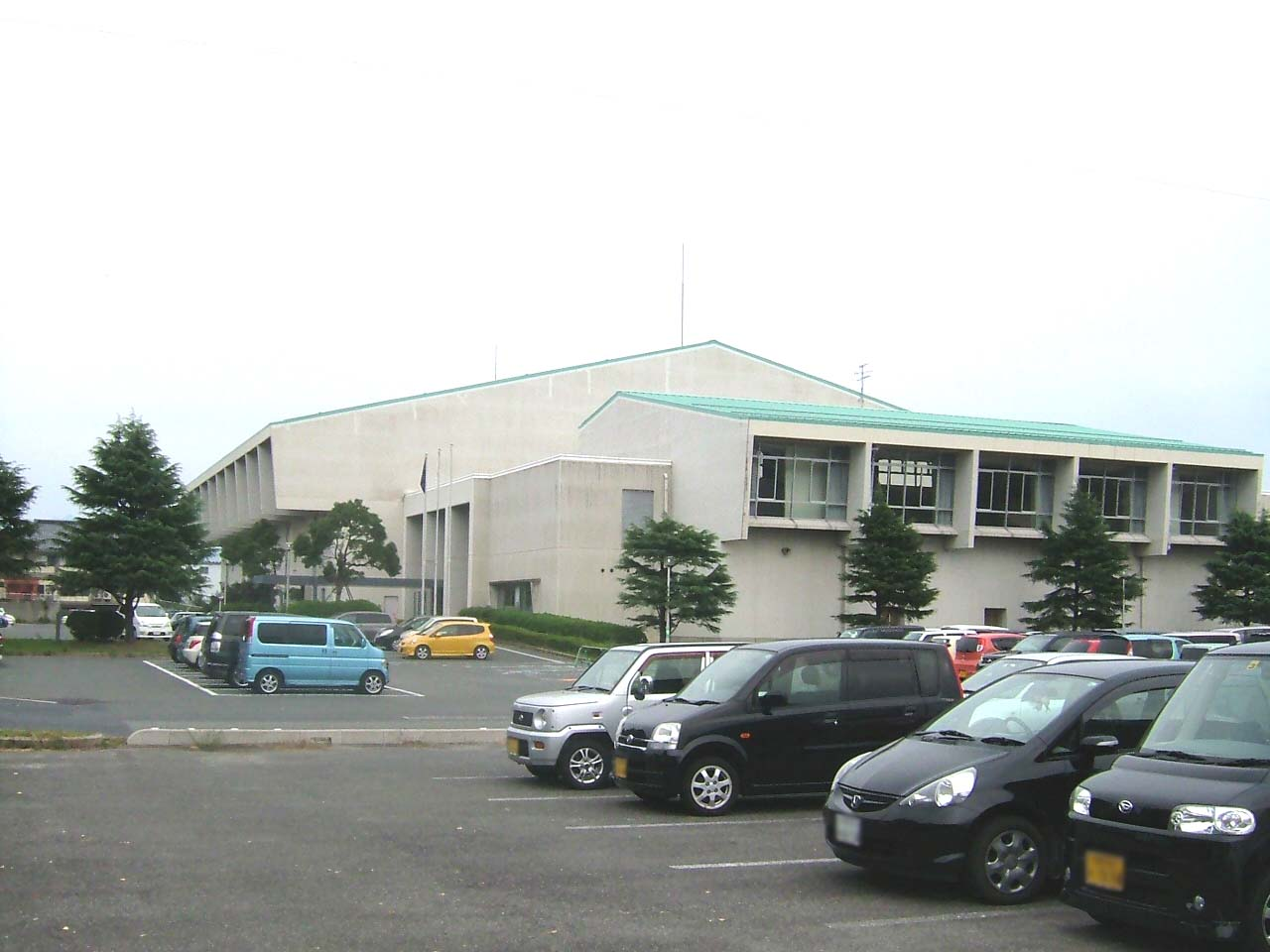
- Interactive map of Yonago Industrial Gymnasium
- Full name: Yonago Industrial Gymnasium
- Location: Yonago, Tottori, Japan
- Owner: Tottori Prefecture
- Operator: Tottori Prefecture
- Capacity: 2,000

Construction
- Cost

Website
- http://yonago-santai.jp/

Yonago Industrial Gymnasium is an arena in Yonago, Tottori, Japan.

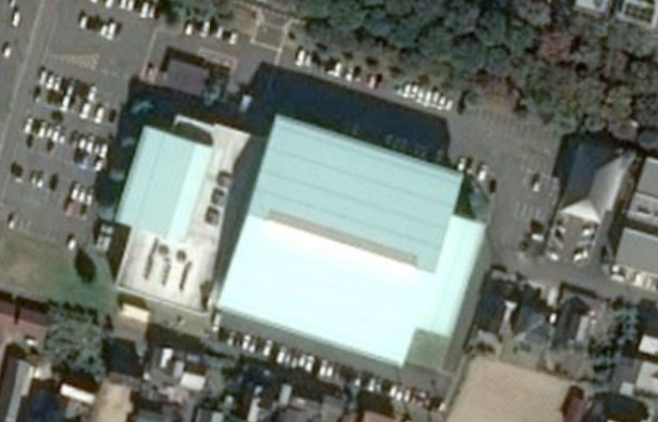
Satellite view
