= Ariake, Tokyo =

District in Kōtō, Tokyo, Japan

Coordinates: 35.632779°N 139.790425°E

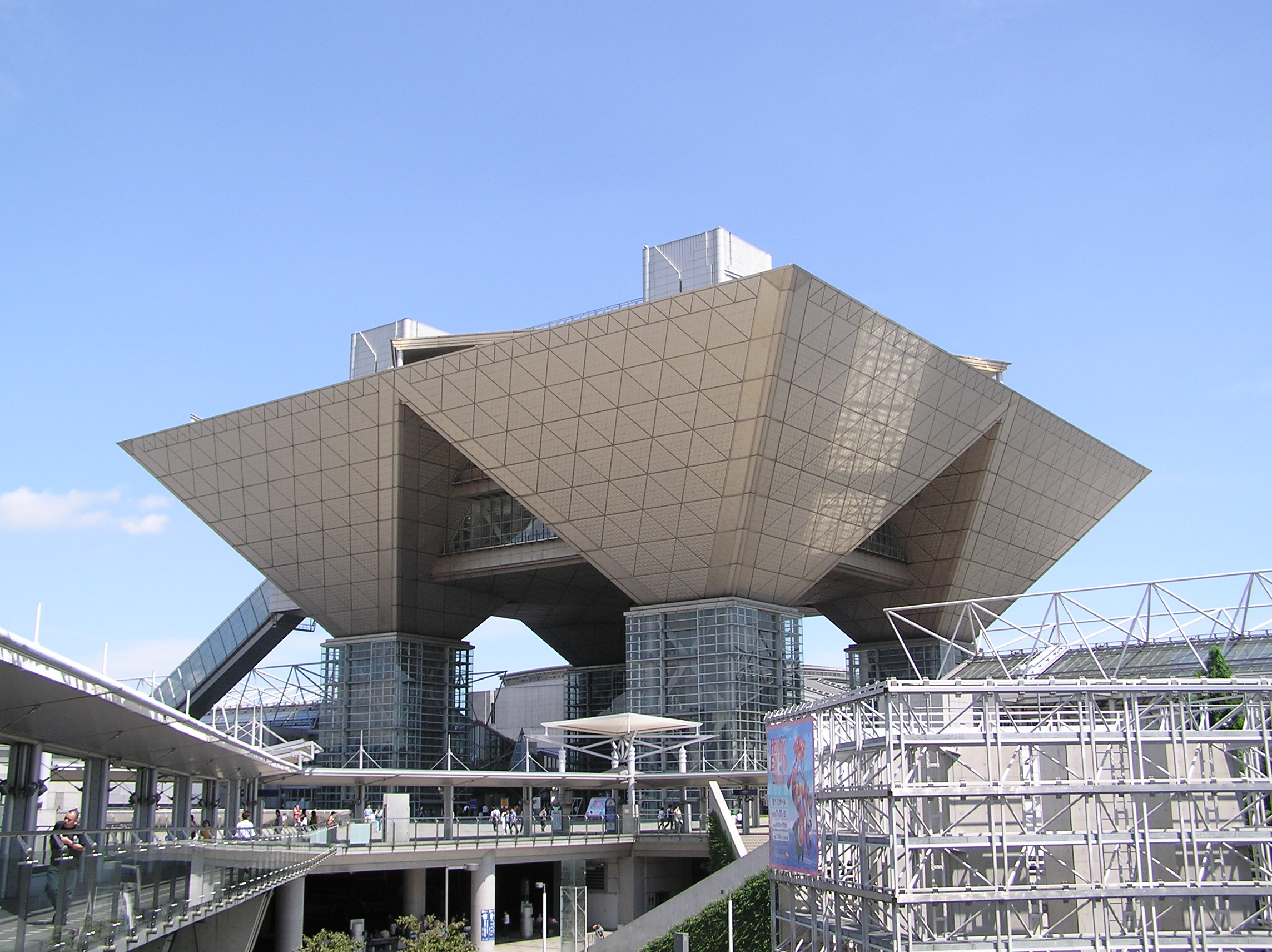
Tokyo Big Sight

Ariake (有明) is a district in Kōtō, Tokyo, Japan. It is best known as the region adjacent to and directly east of Odaiba. Ariake is subdivided into four chome and comprises part of the Tokyo Bay Landfill No. 10 and Tokyo Rinkai Satellite City Center. As of April 2012 its population was 6,145. Ariake is most well known internationally as the site of the Tokyo Big Sight international exhibition centre. Other important facilities located within Ariake include the Ariake Tennis Forest Park (Ariake Tenisu no Mori Kōen), Ariake Coliseum, Ariake Sports Center, Massachusetts Mutual Life Insurance Company, Tokyo Ariake University of Medical and Health Sciences, the Japanese Foundation for Cancer Research and the headquarters of Universal Entertainment Corporation. Ariake is a center for shipping in the pulp and paper industry.

The failed Tokyo bid for the 2016 Summer Olympics proposed holding many of its events in Ariake. Once the city won the rights to host the 2020 Summer Olympics, the flame cauldron was installed on the Yume no Ohashi bridge, that crosses the Ariake West Canal, and the district received new sports venues in the Ariake Gymnastics Centre, Ariake Arena, and Ariake Urban Sports Park.

== Education ==
Koto Ward Board of Education operates public elementary and junior high schools.

Ariake Elementary School (有明小学校) is the zoned public elementary school for parts of Ariake, while Ariake Nishi Gakuen (有明西学園) is the zoned public elementary school for other parts of Ariake.

Ariake Junior High School (有明中学校) is the zoned junior high for parts of Ariake. Some areas are zoned to Ariake Nishi Gakuen for junior high school.
