= K-1 World MAX 2007 World Championship final =

K-1 martial arts event in 2007

K-1 World MAX 2007 World Championship Final
- Promotion: K-1
- Date: October 3, 2007
- Venue: Nippon Budokan
- City: Tokyo, Japan
- Attendance: 14,231

Event chronology
K-1 World Grand Prix 2007 in Seoul Final 16	K-1 World MAX 2007 World Championship Final	K-1 Fighting Network Latvia 2007

K-1 WORLD MAX 2007 World Championship Final was a kickboxing event promoted by the K-1 organization. It was the sixth annual K-1 World MAX final for middleweight kickboxers (70 kg/154 lb weight class), involving eight finalists and four reserve fighters, with all bouts fought under K-1 rules. Seven of the finalists had won elimination fights at the K-1 World MAX 2007 World Tournament Final Elimination, while the eighth, Gago Drago, had been invited despite losing his elimination match. Another defeated elimination fighter Virgil Kalakoda would be called up to take part in a reserve fight, while the other three reservists were invitees. As well as tournament fights there was an opening fight and two super fights fought under K-1 rules (various weight classes). In total there were eighteen fighters at the event, representing ten countries.

The tournament was won by shoot boxer Andy Souwer who won his second K-1 MAX world final by defeating home favorite Masato who was also vying for his second tournament victory, in what was a rematch from the previous years semi final. After a close first round in which Masato was the aggressor, Souwer turned it on in the second, his low kicks wearing out the Japanese fighter forcing an exhausted and hurt Masato unable to come out for the third round. A delighted Souwer was presented as the victor, dedicating the victory to his recently born second child. It had been a competitive tournament with both finalists having had to work hard to make the final – Souwer had defeated the tough Gago Drago and fellow countryman and 2002 champion Albert Kraus, while Masato had defeated x2 K-1 MAX world champion Buakaw and newcomer Artur Kyshenko – with the victory against Buakaw in particular leaving its toll on Masato. The event was held at the Nippon Budokan in Tokyo, Japan on Wednesday, October 3, 2007 in front of a full house of 14,231.

== K-1 World MAX 2007 World Championship Final ==
Final Elimination
(Thailand) Buakaw Por. Pramuk	DEC
(Netherlands) Nieky Holzken
(Japan) Masato	DEC
(Brazil) Gesias Cavalcante
(Armenia) Gago Drago
(Greece) Mike Zambidis	DEC
(Ukraine) Artur Kyshenko	KO
(South Korea) Su Hwan Lee
(Netherlands) Albert Kraus	DEC
(South Africa) Virgil Kalakoda
(Japan) Yoshihiro Sato	DEC
(Germany) Denis Schneidmiller
(Netherlands) Andy Souwer	KO
(Denmark) Ole Laursen

Quarterfinals
(Thailand) Buakaw Por. Pramuk
(Japan) Masato	DEC
(Greece) Mike Zambidis
(Ukraine) Artur Kyshenko	DEC
(Netherlands) Albert Kraus	DEC
(Japan) Yoshihiro Sato
(Netherlands) Andy Souwer	KO
(Armenia) Gago Drago *

Semifinals
(Japan) Masato	KO
(Ukraine) Artur Kyshenko
(Netherlands) Albert Kraus
(Netherlands) Andy Souwer	DEC

Final
(Japan) Masato
(Netherlands) Andy Souwer	TKO

* Gago Drago was invited to the Final despite losing his elimination fight

== Results ==
K-1 World MAX 2007 World Championship Final Results
Opening Fight -75 kg: K-1 Rules / 3Min. 3R
(Northern Mariana Islands) Gori def. Ryoji (Japan)
Gori defeated Ryoji by 3rd Round Unanimous Decision 3-0 (30-27, 30-27, 30-26).
K-1 World MAX Tournament Reserve Fight 2 –70 kg: K-1 Rules / 3Min. 3R Ext.1R
(Turkey) Murat Direkçi def. Satoruvashicoba (Japan)
Direkçi defeated Satoruvashicoba by KO (Left Hook) at 0:39 of the 2nd Round.
Super Fight 1 –60 kg: K-1 Rules / 3Min. 3R
(Japan) Hiroya def. Kwon Min Seok (South Korea)
Hiroya defeated Elozzang by 3rd Round Unanimous Decision 3-0 (30-29, 30-28, 30-28).
K-1 World MAX Tournament Reserve Fight 1 –70 kg: K-1 Rules / 3Min. 3R Ext.1R
(South Africa) Virgil Kalakoda def. Takayuki Kohiruimaki (Japan)
Kalakoda defeated Kohiruimaki by KO (Right Hook) at 1:56 of the 3rd Round.
K-1 World MAX Tournament Quarter Finals -70 kg: K-1 Rules / 3Min. 3R Ext.1R
(Japan) Masato def. Buakaw Por. Pramuk (Thailand)
Masato defeated Por. Pramuk by 3rd Round Unanimous Decision 3-0 (30-27, 30-27, 29-27).
(Ukraine) Artur Kyshenko def. Mike Zambidis (Greece)
Kyshenko defeated Zambidis by Extra Round Unanimous Decision 3-0 (10-9 10-9, 10-9). After 3 rounds it was scored a Majority Draw 1-0 (30-29, 30-30, 30-29) in favour of Kyshenko.
(Netherlands) Albert Kraus def. Yoshihiro Sato (Japan)
Kraus defeated Sato by 3rd Round Unanimous Decision 3-0 (30-29, 30-29, 30-29).
(Netherlands) Andy Souwer def. Gago Drago (Armenia)
Souwer defeated Drago by KO (Right Punch) at 1:43 of the 2nd Round.
K-1 World MAX Tournament Semi Finals -70 kg: K-1 Rules / 3Min. 3R Ext.1R
(Japan) Masato def. Artur Kyshenko (Ukraine)
Masato defeated Kyshenko by KO (Left Hook) at 0:41 of the 2nd Round.
(Netherlands) Andy Souwer def. Albert Kraus (Netherlands)
Souwer defeated Kraus by 3rd Round Majority Decision 2-0 (30-29, 30-30, 30-29).
Super Fight 2 –70 kg: K-1 Rules / 3Min. 3R Ext.1R
(South Korea) Su Hwan Lee def. Kazuya Yasuhiro (Japan)
Lee defeated Yashuhiro by 3rd Round Unanimous Decision 3-0 (30-29, 30-29, 30-29).
K-1 World MAX Tournament Final -70 kg: K-1 Rules / 3Min. 3R Ext.2R
(Netherlands) Andy Souwer def. Masato (Japan)
Souwer defeated Masato by TKO (Corner Stoppage) at 3:00 of the 2nd Round.

== See also ==
- List of K-1 Events
- List of K-1 champions
- List of male kickboxers
