= Genki Sudo =

Japanese mixed martial artist, musician, and politician (born 1978)

- 須藤 元気
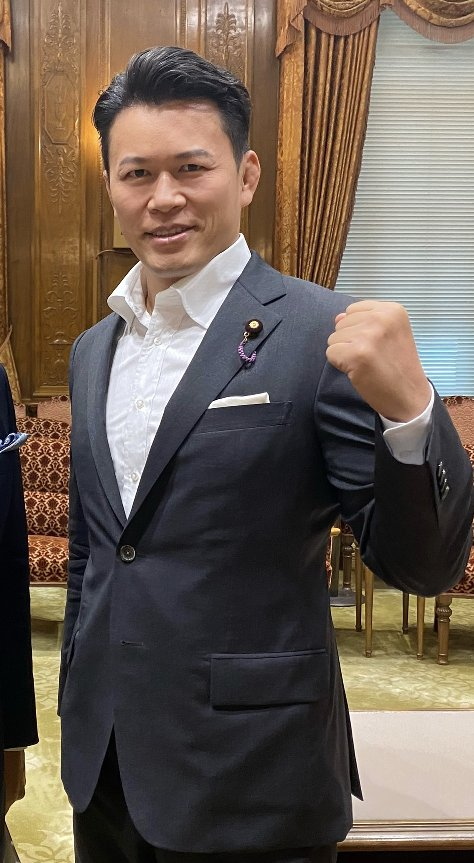

Member of House of Councillors
- In office 28 July 2019 – 16 April 2024
- Constituency: National PR

Personal details
- Born: 8 March 1978 (age 48) Kōtō, Tokyo, Japan
- Party: DPP (since 2025)
- Other political affiliations: CDP (2019–2020); Independent (2020–2025)
- Education: Takushoku University
- Martial arts career
- Other names: Neo-Samurai (UFC); Transforming Trickster (K-1/Hero's)
- Height: 1.75 m (5 ft 9 in)
- Weight: 70 kg (154 lb; 11 st 0 lb)
- Division: Lightweight
- Style: Greco-Roman wrestling, Karate, Kung Fu, Brazilian Jiu-Jitsu, Kickboxing, Sambo, Shootfighting
- Fighting out of: Tokyo, Japan
- Team: Beverly Hills Jiu-Jitsu Club
- Teachers: Bas Rutten; Sanae Kikuta
- Rank: Black belt in Brazilian Jiu-Jitsu
- Years active: 1998–2006

Kickboxing record
- Total: 6
- Wins: 2
- By knockout: 2
- Losses: 4
- By knockout: 2

Mixed martial arts record
- Total: 21
- Wins: 16
- By knockout: 1
- By submission: 12
- By decision: 3
- Losses: 4
- By knockout: 1
- By decision: 3
- Draws: 1

Other information
- Mixed martial arts record from Sherdog
- Last updated on: 1 March 2011
- Musical career
- Genres: Techno, synthpop
- Occupation: Singer
- Years active: 2006–present
- Member of: World Order

Genki Sudo (須藤 元気, Sudō Genki; born 8 March 1978) is a Japanese former mixed martial artist, singer, actor, and politician. Between 1998 and 2006, Sudo was a professional athlete and then was in the entertainment industry from 2006 to 2019. He has since returned to his previous position in World Order as of September 2021 where he is currently active.

He is a retired mixed martial artist and a kickboxer who, until 31 December 2006 competed in the Japanese fighting organization HERO'S and before that, the Ultimate Fighting Championship and Pancrase. He is known for his elaborate ring entrances and unorthodox fighting style. Sudo, following his retirement, transitioned into a career in entertainment as a Japanese singer, composer, choreographer, actor, professional calligrapher and author. He is the producer, director, and lead vocalist of the music group World Order, which is known for their techno music style and highly synchronised robotic choreography.

Sudo served in the House of Councillors as a political independent between 2019 and 2024. In 2025, he joined the conservative Democratic Party For the People.

== Early life ==
Born to a chef and Boxing fan, Genki was named after Yu Koyama's sports manga Ganbare Genki. He started practicing Greco-Roman wrestling during high school, and later won JOC Cup All Japan Junior Wrestling Championship during his stay at the Takushoku Junior College. In 1998, after graduating, Genki moved to the United States and enrolled in Santa Monica College, but dropped out soon after. Around this time, he joined the Beverly Hills Jiu-Jitsu Club and practiced Brazilian Jiu-Jitsu. A year after, he returned to Japan to compete in Pancrase by Bas Rutten's mediation.

== MMA career ==
=== Pancrase ===
Genki started his professional career in 1998, when he fought Tiki Ghosn in Extreme Shoot 2. Then he moved to Japanese promotion Pancrase, defeating Kosei Kubota by unanimous decision in his first fight. He joined Sanae Kikuta's Grabaka team to further develop his skills.

Sudo became well known for his particularly flashy choreographed ring entrances that often included costumed dancers. One entrance featured Sudo doing the robot and operating levers that released a column of smoke from the top of his head while wearing a Kentucky Fried Chicken bucket as a hat and a white plastic mask, in an homage to the musician Buckethead.

On 21 December 2001, Sudo fought against Kenichi Yamamoto at Yokohama Cultural Gymnasium, and won by Rear Naked Choke. Prior to the match, Sudo and Yamamoto promised to bet Yamamoto's UFC championship belt on the outcome. Following his win, Sudo was given the belt by Yamamoto, and Sudo was introduced as "UFC Japan Champion" by media after this bout. As the bet was personal, he is not sanctioned as champion by Zuffa.

=== UFC ===
Sudo had his debut in Ultimate Fighting Championship at UFC 38, facing Leigh Remedios. Making his entrance in a kimono and a tengu mask, Sudo showed his personal style by dancing and throwing spin kicks to open the match, eventually launching a flying triangle choke attempt which lasted for most of the round. At the second round, Genki threw Remedios with a hip throw and locked a rear naked choke, making him tap out. The Japanese wrestler then posed with a flag of all the nations and proclaimed his catchphrase of "We Are All One" for a crowd pop.

He returned at UFC 42 against Duane Ludwig. Again Sudo showed his theatrical side, walking backwards towards Ludwig and doing the robot dance before taking him down. However, despite his initial domination, the Japanese started receiving damage while standing, failing in a rolling kneebar and several takedown attempts. Sudo came back at the last round, taking down Ludwig and pounding and bloodying him with punches and elbows. Whilst Ludwig was taking a beating, referee John McCarthy interrupted and stood the two fighters up to check on Ludwig's nose. When the doctor allowed the fight to resume they did not restart from the same previous dominant position held by Sudo. Ludwig took advantage of the indirect rest given to him and avoided, with the aid of the referee's decision, the unfavorable position that he was in. He dominated the end of the fight landing hurtful shots on Sudo to win a split decision. Ludwig mocked Sudo after the final bell with a crane kick pose.

Sudo's last fight in UFC would be against the debuting Mike Brown in UFC 47. Brown tried to capitalize in Sudo's confusing moves by rushing him against the fence, managing to slam him on the mat, but Sudo then locked a triangle choke and transitioned into an armbar for the tap out.

=== Hero's ===
Genki Sudo was defeated by K-1 HERO's lightweight champion Norifumi "Kid" Yamamoto. The fight was won by a controversial referee stoppage after Sudo was knocked down by a right hand which was followed by some punches.

At K-1 Dynamite! on 31 December 2006 he defeated Damacio Page by submission. After his win, and to the shock of the crowd, Sudo announced his retirement.

=== After retirement ===
Prior to his retirement on New Year's Eve Sudo fought for K-1 HERO's, the mixed martial arts branch of the most popular Japanese combat sports circuit.

In 2008, he accepted the position of Manager for Takushoku University's wrestling team. In the 2009 Eastern Japan University League Games, the 2009 All Japan University Greco-Roman Championship Tournament, and the 2010 All Japan University Wrestling Conference, he was awarded the prize for Best Manager. In addition, he led the team to victory in the 2010 All Japan Student Wrestling Championship, and in his second year as manager Takushoku University was victorious at all four of the biggest student wrestling tournaments. In 2010, he was made the Japanese representative manager for the World University Championship.

Sudo was cast in Kamen Rider W Forever: A to Z/The Gaia Memories of Fate (仮面ライダーW（ダブル） FOREVER AtoZ／運命のガイアメモリ) in 2010 as Kyosui Izumi, member of NEVER and user of the T2 Luna Memory. He reprised his role in Kamen Rider Eternal, in Kamen Rider W Returns which was released on 21 July 2011. He has also finished filming his part of the movie The R246 Story.

On 8 April 2010 he received his black belt in Brazilian Jiu-jitsu under Naoyoshi Watanabe at Triforce Academy.

== Kickboxing career ==
Sudo participated in a K-1 tournament in 2002. He lost in the semi-finals. He has had important matches against Masato and Albert Kraus, both going to decisions.

== Fighting style ==
A fighter with unorthodox striking and grappling ability, he has won fights by knockout in both mixed martial arts and kickboxing. Among the techniques that he favors are the spinning backfist, flying triangle choke and flying armbar.

== Personal life ==
Sudo is a practicing Buddhist. He married on 22 November 2007, but got divorced in 2014.

Sudo has written 15 books and has started an amateur baseball team for people 30 and over.

On 1 August 2009, Sudo and his office made an official statement to say information on Wikipedia was wrong. According to their statement, the bout between Sudo and Tiki Ghosn was originally declared a draw which was overturned after Sudo's corner man, Bas Rutten, objected, at which point Sudo was declared the winner and given a medal.

On 25 January 2010, Sudo took the entrance examination of Takushoku University Graduate School and he was admitted to the school on 29 January. He entered the Local Government Course (Master's Program) of the Graduate School of Local Government.

== Instructor lineage ==
=== Brazilian jiu-jitsu ===
Jigoro Kano → Mitsuyo "Count Koma" Maeda → Carlos Gracie, Sr. → Helio Gracie → Rolls Gracie → Romero "Jacaré" Cavalcanti → Alexandre Paiva → Naoyoshi Watanabe → Genki Sudo

=== Shoot wrestling ===
Billy Riley → Karl Gotch → Yoshiaki Fujiwara → Masakatsu Funaki → Genki Sudo

== Career accomplishments ==
=== Mixed martial arts ===
- Ultimate Fighting Championship
  - UFC Encyclopedia Awards
    - Submission of the Night (One time) vs. Leigh Remedios

== Mixed martial arts record ==
Professional record breakdown
21 matches	16 wins	4 losses
By knockout	2	1
By submission	11	0
By decision	3	3
Draws	1	

Res.	Record	Opponent	Method	Event	Date	Round	Time	Location	Notes
Win	16–4–1	Damacio Page	Submission (triangle choke)	K-1 PREMIUM 2006 Dynamite!!	31 December 2006	1	3:05	Osaka, Japan	
Win	15–4–1	Ole Laursen	Decision (unanimous)	Hero's 4	15 March 2006	3	5:00	Tokyo, Japan	
Loss	14–4–1	Norifumi Yamamoto	TKO (punches)	K-1 PREMIUM 2005 Dynamite!!	31 December 2005	1	4:39	Osaka, Japan	Hero's 2005 Lightweight Grand Prix Final.
Win	14–3–1	Hiroyuki Takaya	Submission (triangle choke)	Hero's 3	7 September 2005	2	3:47	Tokyo, Japan	Hero's 2005 Lightweight Grand Prix Semi-final.
Win	13–3–1	Kazuyuki Miyata	Submission (armbar)	Hero's 3	7 September 2005	2	4:45	Tokyo, Japan	Hero's 2005 Lightweight Grand Prix Quarterfinal.
Win	12–3–1	Ramon Dekkers	Submission (heel hook)	Hero's 1	26 March 2005	1	2:54	Saitama, Japan	
Win	11–3–1	Royler Gracie	KO (punches)	K-1 MMA ROMANEX	22 May 2004	1	3:40	Saitama, Japan	
Win	10–3–1	Mike Brown	Submission (triangle armbar)	UFC 47	2 April 2004	1	3:31	Paradise, Nevada, United States	
Win	9–3–1	Butterbean	Submission (heel hook)	K-1 PREMIUM 2003 Dynamite!!	31 December 2003	2	0:41	Nagoya, Japan	
Loss	8–3–1	Duane Ludwig	Decision (split)	UFC 42	25 April 2003	3	5:00	Miami, Florida, United States	
Win	8–2–1	Leigh Remedios	Submission (rear-naked choke)	UFC 38	13 July 2002	2	1:38	London, England	
Win	7–2–1	Kenichi Yamamoto	Submission (rear-naked choke)	Rings: World Title Series 5	21 December 2001	2	1:46	Yokohama, Japan	
Win	6–2–1	Brian Lo-A-Njoe	Submission (triangle choke)	Rings: Battle Genesis Vol. 8	21 September 2001	1	2:17	Tokyo, Japan	
Win	5–2–1	Craig Oxley	Submission (achilles lock)	Pancrase – Trans 6	31 October 2000	1	3:14	Tokyo, Japan	
Draw	4–2–1	André Pederneiras	Draw	C2K – Colosseum 2000	26 May 2000	1	15:00	Tokyo, Japan	
Loss	4–2	Kiuma Kunioku	Decision (unanimous)	Pancrase – Trans 2	27 February 2000	2	3:00	Osaka, Japan	
Win	4–1	Nate Marquardt	Submission (armbar)	Pancrase – Breakthrough 11	18 December 1999	1	13:31	Yokohama, Japan	
Win	3–1	Victor Hunsaker	TKO (submission to elbows)	Pancrase – Breakthrough 9	25 October 1999	1	1:43	Tokyo, Japan	
Loss	2–1	Minoru Toyonaga	Decision (unanimous)	Pancrase – 1999 Neo-Blood Tournament Second Round	1 August 1999	2	3:00	Tokyo, Japan	
Win	2–0	Kousei Kubota	Decision (unanimous)	Pancrase – 1999 Neo-Blood Tournament Opening Round	1 August 1999	2	3:00	Tokyo, Japan	
Win	1–0	Tiki Ghosn	Decision (draw overturned)	ES 2 – Extreme Shoot 2	6 June 1998	3	5:00	Mission Viejo, California, United States	Originally declared a draw, overturned after Sudo's corner man, Bas Rutten, objected, at which point Sudo was declared the winner.

== Submission grappling record ==
Result	Opponent	Method	Event	Date	Round	Time	Notes
Loss	(Brazil) Vitor Belfort		ADCC 2001 Absolute	2001	3		
Loss	(Brazil) Rodrigo Gracie		ADCC 2001 –77 kg	2001	3		
Win	(Japan) Caol Uno	Decision	The CONTENDERS 2000	2000	2		

== Kickboxing record ==
6 Fights: 2 Wins (2 (T)KO's), 4 Losses (2 (T)KO's, 2 decisions)
Date	Result	Opponent	Event	Location	Method	Round	Time
2006-09-04	Loss	(Australia) Ian Schaffa	K-1 World MAX 2006 Champions Challenge	Kōtō, Tokyo, Japan	TKO (Referee Stoppage)	2	0:59
2004-10-13	Win	(United States) Michael Lerma	K-1 World MAX 2004 Champions' Challenge	Shibuya, Tokyo, Japan	TKO (Cut)	2	2:09
2003-11-18	Loss	(Netherlands) Albert Kraus	K-1 World MAX 2003 Champions' Challenge	Chiyoda, Tokyo, Japan	Decision (Unanimous)	3	3:00
2003-03-01	Loss	(Japan) Masato	K-1 World MAX 2003 Japan Grand Prix Quarterfinal	Kōtō, Tokyo, Japan	Decision (Unanimous)	3	3:00
2002-10-11	Win	(South Korea) Jin-Woo Kim	K-1 World MAX 2002 Champions' Challenge	Kōtō, Tokyo, Japan	KO (Spinning Back Fist)	2	0:16
2002-02-11	Loss	(Japan) Takayuki Kohiruimaki	K-1 Japan MAX 2002 Quarterfinal	, Japan	TKO (Referee Stoppage)	3	1:27

Legend: Win Loss Draw/No contest Notes

== Bibliography ==
The following books are all essays.

Original Title	Original Publication Date	English Name
幸福論; Kōfuku-ron	2005	The theory of Happiness
風の谷のあの人と結婚する方法; Kaze no tani no Anohito to Kekkonsuru houhou	2006	How to Marry The Woman living in the Valley of the Wind
神はテーブルクロス; Kami ha Tēburu Kurosu	2007	God is The Tablecloth
レボリューション; Reboryūshon	2007	Revolution
バシャール スドウゲンキ; Bashāru Sudo Genki	2007	Genki Sudo, The Bashar
無意識はいつも君に語りかける; Muishiki wa itsumo kimini katarikakeru	2008	Subconscious Always Talks to You
キャッチャー・イン・ザ・オクタゴン; Kacchā in za Okutagon	2008	Catcher in the Octagon
愛と革命のルネサンス; Ai to Kakumei no Runessansu	2009	Renaissance Of Love and Revolution
Let's 猫 Let's Neko	2010	Let's Cat
今日が残りの人生最初の日 kyouga nokorino jinnsei saisyo no hi	2010	Today is the firstday of the rest in my life
美は肉体に宿る bi ha nikutaini yadoru	2011	Beauty dwells in the body
WE ARE ALL ONE; WE ARE ALL ONE	2011	

== Discography ==
Title	Date	Type	Publisher
Love and Everything	6 September 2006	Single (CD)	Toshiba EMI (EMI Music Japan)
Missing Beauty	1 December 2015	Single	

== Film actor roles ==
- 2002: Madness in Bloom (凶気の桜)
- 2005: Fly, Daddy, Fly (フライ,ダディ,フライ)
- 2005: Swirling Fire (鳶がクルリと)
- 2008: R246 STORY「ありふれた帰省」
- 2010: Kamen Rider W Forever: A to Z/The Gaia Memories of Fate
- 2012: Rurouni Kenshin (るろうに剣心)

=== Original video ===
- 2011: Kamen Rider W Returns: Kamen Rider Eternal

== Television drama roles ==
- Friday Night Drama (TV Asahi)
  - Sky High 2 (2004)
  - Maid Deka (2009)

== Titles ==
- JOC Cup All Japan Junior Wrestling Championship Winner(1996)
- Hero's Middleweight Tournament Runner-up

== Awards ==
- Martial arts
  - UFC 38 Tap Out Award
  - UFC 38 Best Fighter Award
  - UFC 47 Tap Out Award
  - UFC 47 Best Fighter Award
- Movie
  - Spotlight Award (Short Short Film Festival & Asia 2008)
- Japanese calligraphy
  - Newcomer Encouragement Award (15th Taisho exhibition)

== See also ==
- List of male mixed martial artists
