= Masato (kickboxer) =

Japanese kickboxer (born 1979)

- Born: Masato Kobayashi; 10 March 1979 (age 47); Kashiwa, Chiba, Japan
- Native name: 小林 雅人
- Other names: Silver Wolf; Charisma of MAX; Mākun the Rebellious Charisma
- Height: 1.74 m (5 ft 8 1/2 in)
- Weight: 70 kg (154 lb; 11 st 0 lb)
- Division: Welterweight
- Style: Kickboxing
- Fighting out of: Tokyo, Japan
- Team: Silver Wolf
- Trainer: Nuathoranee Thongracha (Muay Thai/Kickboxing); Satoshi Iida (Boxing)
- Years active: 1997–2009

Kickboxing record
- Total: 63
- Wins: 55
- By knockout: 25
- Losses: 6
- By knockout: 2
- Draws: 2

Other information
- Spouse: Shin Yazawa (m. 2007)
- Children: 3
- Website: www.k-masato.com

Masato Kobayashi (小林 雅人, Kobayashi Masato; born March 10, 1979), known as Masato (魔裟斗) is a Japanese retired welterweight kickboxer. He was the ISKA World Welterweight Oriental Rules champion, as well as the winner of the K-1 WORLD MAX World tournament in 2003 and 2008. In addition, he was also the runner-up of the K-1 World MAX World tournament in 2004 and 2007.

Prior to the K-1 Rising event in Madrid in May 2012, it was announced that Masato will be working as an executive producer for K-1.

== Biography ==
=== Early life ===
Masato Kobayashi was born in Kashiwa City, Chiba Prefecture Japan on March 10, 1979. When he was young, he moved to Niiza, Saitama because of his parents' job. He started going to Asagiri Municipal Asagiri 4th Junior High School (ja). After graduating junior high school, he attended Saitama Sakae High School, but soon dropped out with his friends. He described the reason for dropping out simply as "enthusiasm" when he appeared on popular Japanese television show "Junk Sports" (ja). After dropping out, he worked many jobs but did not hold a steady position. Although he got a job as an assistant at a yakitori bar, he quit the job on the first day, saying he was "going to leave for lunch".

In 1994, when he was 15 years old, he joined Yonekura Boxing Gym. After failing his test for a professional boxers' license, he left the gym. When he was 17 years old, he joined Fuji Gym and started learning kickboxing, because he thought kickboxing was useful for street fighting. After passing the exam for professional kickboxing, he became a professional kickboxer under All Japan Kickboxing Federation (AJKF). Before his first fight, Shigeo Kato, the owner of Fuji gym, tried to name him "Fuji Sankaizan" (藤 山海山) for his ring name, but was rejected. Thereupon, Kato suggested another ring name Masato (魔裟斗), "the homonym term of Masato (雅人)". He accepted that name but he did not like it because it gave a bad impression as its script was similar to Japanese motorcycle gang names.

=== All Japan Kickboxing Federation ===
Masato made his professional debut on March 23, 1997, against Hutoshi Takehara, winning by KO in the first round. In his second bout, he fought against Takayuki Kohiruimaki on May 30, losing by KO due to knee strikes in the third. Originally, this bout was promoted as an ordinary freshman bout of three rounds, but was later upgraded to the main event due to the cancellation of a previously scheduled main event.

On March 17, 1999, he fought against Tomoharu Chiba for the vacant national AJKF title at welterweight, when he was only 20 years old. He knocked out Chiba in the third round and became the new champion. After this victory, he began receiving offers for international matches. On November 22, he fought against Eval Denton from United States, and won by decision at 5R. When Paul Ingram, the president of WKA, watched this bout, he evaluated Masato highly and considered rating him for world rating, but this was to be Masato's last bout in the AJKF. After this bout, he was rated as #13 welterweight by World Kickboxing Association (WKA), but he announced that he was going to part with AJKF in December. Masato was offered to fight against Mohamed Ouali from Morocco on January 21 by AJKF to improve his WKA rating, but he refused the fight because he did not give agree on the conditions of the bout. He sent his manager to AJKF for negotiation on January 14, but it broke down. For this reason, the bout was canceled. He handed in a notice of withdrawal to AJKF and Fuji gym on March 14 and returned his title on that same day. According to the announcement from AJKF, the contract between AJKF, Fuji gym, and Masato was until for 2002. Because of this withdrawal, he lost his training area, so he asked some martial arts gyms to rent some space for training.

=== Silver Wolf ===
As Masato left AJKF, he started managing himself with his team "Silver Wolf". On April 16, 2000, Masato went to Thailand, and fought against Kongnapa Sor.Chalermsak. He knocked out Kongnapa cold with a swift left uppercut. On November 1, he was offered to join K-1 to challenge Morad Sari from France. He knocked out Sari in the 2R with a left hook, and took Sari's world International Sport Karate Association (ISKA) oriental rules title. Takashi Ito, the Japanese veteran kickboxer, decided to retire when he saw this fight. For this reason, he had a retirement bout (Exhibition) with Masato on March 30, 2001.

On December 5, Masato took part in the King's Birthday event and fought against Suriya Sor. Ploenchit, a highly ranked southpaw, who would later go on to compete in the 2004 Summer Olympics and win a bronze medal in Welterweight boxing, for the vacant world title of International World Muaythai (IWM) title at Super welterweight. Masato was unprepared for Suriya's southpaw style and was dominated for the entire 5 rounds. Originally Masato was scheduled to fight Orono Por.Muang U-Bon but due to the speculation that Orono had Hepatitis B, Masato's team opted not to fight, only days before the event.

=== K-1 WORLD MAX 2002 ===
Masato participated in the 2002 K-1 MAX Tournament on February 11, 2002. This tournament was televised all around Japan by the Tokyo Broadcasting System (TBS), and the directors introduced Masato as "the Rebellious Charisma" (反逆のカリスマ) for their advertising slogan, and they continued to use it whenever Masato was on television. Although it became commonly known, Masato hated his new nickname and said "Stop using it" during an interview, because he did not understand what Rebellious stood for. He beat Takayuki Kohiruimaki, the only person who had beaten Masato before among the Japanese fighters, by unanimous decision at the tournament final. After the tournament, Kohiruimaki said "I'll fight against him again and kill him without fail" in the ring to the audience).

On May 11, 2002, he participated in the K-1 World MAX 2002 World Tournament Final. He beat Duane Ludwig by unanimous decision in 3R. In the next fight, he was knocked down by Albert Kraus at 2R and lost by unanimous decision in the semi-final.

Masato fought in his own event, "Wolf Revolution". He fought against Melvin Murray from Canada, and knocked Murray out with low kicks in the 2nd round.

=== K-1 WORLD MAX 2003 ===
On the 5th of July 2003, Masato was invited again to join the K-1 World MAX 2003 World Tournament Final. He defeated the Greek kick-boxer Mike Zambidis in the quarter-finals by a split decision, after a close fight. He then moved on to the semi-finals to fight Thai kick-boxer Sakeddaw Kiatputon whom he defeated via a Right uppercut KO. Masato then moved on to fight in his first K-1 World MAX final for the title against Albert Kraus, whom he lost to at the K-1 World MAX 2002 World Tournament Final via decision (Kraus went on to win the title), and also again fought Kraus later that year at K-1 World MAX 2002 Champions' Challenge which resulted in a decision draw. Masato finally managed to defeat Kraus via a left hook knockout in the 2nd round at 2:26 making him the new K-1 World MAX Champion.

On December 15, 2003, Masato fought two more times in semi-contact exhibitions matches for the Wolf Revolution, including a single round of MMA rules against Caol Uno who had fought on UFC before.

=== K-1 WORLD MAX 2004 ===
After defeating three opponents, including Kraus, Masato lost to Buakaw by decision in the tournament finals. The three-round match was a draw and required an extra round to determine a winner. After the match, Masato was sent to the hospital for broken ribs and facial damage.

=== Marriage ===
On February 13, he had a press conference to announce his marriage with his wife Shin Yazawa, a Japanese actress. They said they registered their marriage at the public office on February 11, 2007. He disclosed that he is called "Mākun" by his wife as his nickname. His parents and Musashi also call Masato "Mākun".

=== K-1 WORLD MAX 2007 ===
On October 3, 2007, he participated in his 6th consecutive K-1 World MAX Final held in Tokyo, Japan. In quarter finals he was matched up against the reigning champion Buakaw Por. Pramuk. Near the end of the first round, Masato connected with a left uppercut and right cross combo that knocked Buakaw down. Masato maintained the pace of the fight throughout, and won the fight by unanimous decision.

In the semis, Masato was paired up against Artur Kyshenko. The first round unfolded with Kyshenko imposing his range and size on Masato, keeping him at bay throwing hard right hands and left hooks. The second round saw Masato pushing the pace with more leg kicks and combinations. At the two-minute mark, Masato threw an overhand right which stunned Kyshenko, and then followed up with a left hook which sent the Ukrainian to the canvas. Kyshenko did not make the count, sending Masato to the finals against the Dutch Shoot boxer Andy Souwer.

Masato dominated the first round by throwing body-head combinations and backing Souwer onto the ropes. However, at the end of the round Souwer's methodical leg kicks started to take its toll. In the second the leg kicks were visibly affecting Masato and at the very end, Souwer delivered two knee strikes to the left leg while clinching with Masato which made it obvious that Masato could not walk straight afterwards and he did not answer the bell for the third round, giving Souwer the victory by TKO and making him the 2007 K-1 World MAX champion.

=== K-1 WORLD MAX 2008 ===
On October 1, 2008, Masato won his second K-1 MAX title, defeating Yoshihiro Sato and Artur Kyshenko.

=== Retirement ===
Masato fought his retirement fight against Andy Souwer. Masato won the fight after five rounds where he dropped Souwer with a right hand in the fourth round.

=== K-1 Global EP ===
In May 2012, Masato was announced as the executive producer for K-1 Global. A K-1 Global press release on 31 December 2012 announced that Masato resigned from his position as the executive producer.

== Titles ==
- K-1
  - 2008 K-1 World MAX Champion
  - 2007 K-1 World MAX Runner-up
  - 2004 K-1 World MAX Runner-up
  - 2003 K-1 World MAX Champion
  - 2003 K-1 MAX Japan Champion
  - 2002 K-1 MAX Japan Champion
- International Sport Kickboxing Association
  - 2000 ISKA Oriental rules World Welterweight Champion
- All Japan Kickboxing Federation
  - 1999 AJKF Welterweight Champion

== Kickboxing record ==
Professional kickboxing record
55 Wins (25 (T)KO's), 6 Losses, 2 Draws
Date	Result	Opponent	Event	Location	Method	Round	Time	Record
2009-12-31	Win	(Netherlands) Andy Souwer	Dynamite!! 2009	Saitama, Japan	Decision (Unanimous)	5	3:00	55-6-2
2009-07-13	Win	(Japan) Tatsuya Kawajiri	K-1 World Max 2009 Final 8	Tokyo, Japan	TKO (Corner Stoppage)	2	1:43	54-6-2
2008-10-01	Win	(Ukraine) Artur Kyshenko	K-1 World MAX 2008 Final, Final	Tokyo, Japan	Ext R. Decision (Unanimous)	4	3:00	53-6-2
Wins K-1 World MAX 2008 World Championship title.
2008-10-01	Win	(Japan) Yoshihiro Sato	K-1 World MAX 2008 Final, Semi-finals	Tokyo, Japan	Ext R. Decision (Unanimous)	4	3:00	52-6-2
2008-07-07	Win	(Armenia) Gago Drago	K-1 World MAX 2008 Final 8, Quarter-finals	Tokyo, Japan	Decision (Unanimous)	3	3:00	51-6-2
Qualifies for K-1 World MAX 2008 Final.
2008-04-09	Win	(South Africa) Virgil Kalakoda	K-1 World MAX 2008 Final 16	Tokyo, Japan	KO (Right Hook)	3	0:22	50-6-2
Qualifies for K-1 World MAX 2008 Final 8.
2007-12-31	Win	(South Korea) Yong Soo Choi	K-1 Premium 2007 Dynamite!!	Osaka, Japan	TKO (Corner Stoppage)	3	0:51	49-6-2
2007-10-03	Loss	(Netherlands) Andy Souwer	K-1 World MAX 2007 World Championship Final, Final	Tokyo, Japan	TKO (Corner Stoppage)	2	3:00	48-6-2
Fight was for K-1 World MAX 2007 World Championship title.
2007-10-03	Win	(Ukraine) Artur Kyshenko	K-1 World MAX 2007 World Championship Final, Semi-finals	Tokyo, Japan	KO (Left Hook)	2	0:41	48-5-2
2007-10-03	Win	(Thailand) Buakaw Por. Pramuk	K-1 World MAX 2007 World Championship Final, Quarter-finals	Tokyo, Japan	Decision (Unanimous)	3	3:00	47-5-2
2007-06-28	Win	(Brazil) Gesias Calvancante	K-1 World MAX 2007 Final Elimination	Tokyo, Japan	Decision (Unanimous)	3	3:00	46-5-2
Qualifies for K-1 World MAX 2007 Final.
2007-04-04	Win	(Philippines) Ole Laursen	K-1 World MAX 2007 World Elite Showcase	Yokohama, Japan	Decision (Unanimous)	3	3:00	45-5-2
2006-12-31	Win	(Japan) Satoru Suzuki	K-1 Premium 2006 Dynamite!!	Osaka, Japan	TKO (Referee Stoppage)	2	2:22	44-5-2
2006-06-30	Loss	(Netherlands) Andy Souwer	K-1 World MAX 2006 World Championship Final, Semi-finals	Yokohama, Japan	Decision (Unanimous)	3	3:00	43-5-2
2006-06-30	Win	(Japan) Takayuki Kohiruimaki	K-1 World MAX 2006 World Championship Final, Quarter-finals	Yokohama, Japan	Decision (Unanimous)	3	3:00	43-4-2
2006-04-05	Win	(Lithuania) Remigijus Morkevicius	K-1 World MAX 2006 World Tournament Open	Tokyo, Japan	TKO (Corner Stoppage)	2	1:56	42-4-2
Qualifies for K-1 World MAX 2006 Final.
2006-02-04	Win	(Australia) Ian Schaffa	K-1 World MAX 2006 Japan Tournament	Saitama, Japan	Decision (Unanimous)	3	3:00	41-4-2
2005-12-31	Win	(Japan) Akira Ohigashi	K-1 PREMIUM 2005 Dynamite!!	Osaka, Japan	TKO (Referee Stoppage)	2	1:58	40-4-2
2005-07-20	Win	(Greece) Mike Zambidis	K-1 World MAX 2005 Championship Final, Quarter-finals	Yokohama, Japan	Decision (Unanimous)	3	3:00	39-4-2
Masato withdrew from the tournament due to injury.
2005-05-04	Win	(South Korea) Chi Bin Lim	K-1 World MAX 2005 World Tournament Open	Tokyo, Japan	Decision (Unanimous)	3	3:00	38-4-2
Qualifies for K-1 World MAX 2005 Final.
2004-12-31	Win	(Japan) Norifumi Yamamoto	K-1 PREMIUM 2004 Dynamite!!	Osaka, Japan	Decision (Majority)	3	3:00	37-4-2
2004-07-07	Loss	(Thailand) Buakaw Por. Pramuk	K-1 World MAX 2004 World Tournament Final, Final	Tokyo, Japan	Ext R. Decision (Unanimous)	4	3:00	36-4-2
Fight was for K-1 World MAX 2004 World Championship title.
2004-07-07	Win	(Netherlands) Albert Kraus	K-1 World MAX 2004 World Tournament Final, Semi-finals	Tokyo, Japan	Decision (Unanimous)	3	3:00	36-3-2
2004-07-07	Win	(Mongolia) Jadamba Narantungalag	K-1 World MAX 2004 World Tournament Final, Quarter-finals	Tokyo, Japan	Decision (Unanimous)	3	3:00	35-3-2
2004-04-07	Win	(Turkey) Serkan Yilmaz	K-1 World MAX 2004 World Tournament Open	Tokyo, Japan	Decision (Unanimous)	3	3:00	34-3-2
Qualifies for K-1 World MAX 2004 Final.
2003-11-18	Win	(United States) Vince Phillips	K-1 World MAX 2003 Champions' Challenge	Tokyo, Japan	KO (Right Low-Kick)	2	0:15	33-3-2
2003-07-05	Win	(Netherlands) Albert Kraus	K-1 World MAX 2003 World Tournament Final, Final	Saitama, Japan	KO (Left Hook)	2	2:26	32-3-2
Wins K-1 World MAX 2003 World Championship title.
2003-07-05	Win	(Thailand) Sakeddaw Kiatputon	K-1 World MAX 2003 World Tournament Final, Semi-finals	Saitama, Japan	KO (Right uppercut)	2	2:55	31-3-2
2003-07-05	Win	(Greece) Mike Zambidis	K-1 World MAX 2003 World Tournament Final, Quarter-finals	Saitama, Japan	Decision (Split)	3	3:00	30-3-2
2003-03-01	Win	(Japan) Kozo Takeda	K-1 World MAX 2003 Japan Grand Prix, Final	Tokyo, Japan	Decision (Unanimous)	3	3:00	29-3-2
Wins K-1 Japan MAX 2003 tournament title.
2003-03-01	Win	(Japan) Takehiro Murahama	K-1 World MAX 2003 Japan Grand Prix, Semi-finals	Tokyo, Japan	Decision (Unanimous)	3	3:00	28-3-2
2003-03-01	Win	(Japan) Genki Sudo	K-1 World MAX 2003 Japan Grand Prix, Quarter-finals	Tokyo, Japan	Decision (Unanimous)	3	3:00	27-3-2
2002-10-11	Draw	(Netherlands) Albert Kraus	K-1 World MAX 2002 Champions' Challenge	Tokyo, Japan	Decision draw	5	3:00	26-3-2
2002-08-06	Win	(Canada) Melvin Murray	Wolf Revolution - Resurrection	Japan	TKO (Referee Stoppage)	2	2:59	26-3-1
2002-05-11	Loss	(Netherlands) Albert Kraus	K-1 World MAX 2002 World Tournament Final, Semi-finals	Tokyo, Japan	Decision (Unanimous)	3	3:00	25-3-1
2002-05-11	Win	(United States) Duane Ludwig	K-1 World MAX 2002 World Tournament Final, Quarter-finals	Tokyo, Japan	Decision (Unanimous)	3	3:00	25-2-1
2002-02-11	Win	(Japan) Takayuki Kohiruimaki	K-1 Japan MAX 2002, Final	Tokyo, Japan	Decision (Unanimous)	3	3:00	24-2-1
Wins K-1 Japan MAX 2002 tournament title.
2002-02-11	Win	(Japan) Ryuji Goto	K-1 Japan MAX 2002, Semi-finals	Tokyo, Japan	TKO (Referee Stoppage)	3	2:52	23-2-1
2002-02-11	Win	(Japan) Takehiro Murahama	K-1 Japan MAX 2002, Quarter-finals	Tokyo, Japan	TKO (Referee Stoppage)	3	0:30	22-2-1
2001-12-08	Win	(Cape Verde) Noel Soares	K-1 World Grand Prix 2001	Tokyo, Japan	KO (Right cross)	3	1:30	21-2-1
2001-08-23	Win	(Australia) Ben Burton	Black List 010 meets Wolf Revolution	Japan	KO (Right Low-Kick)	4	1:10	20-2-1
2001-06-22	Win	(Australia) Goran Danilovic	Wolf Revolution Third Wave	Japan	KO (Right Low-Kick)	2	2:06	19-2-1
2001-04-15	Win	(Sweden) Patrik Eriksson	K-1 Burning 2001	Kumamoto, Japan	Decision (Unanimous)	5	3:00	18-2-1
2001-01-21	Win	(Morocco) Mohamed Ouali	Wolf Revolution Second Wave	Japan	TKO (Corner Stoppage)	3	1:26	17-2-1
2000-12-05	Loss	(Thailand) Suriya Sor. Ploenchit	King's Birthday	Bangkok, Thailand	Decision	5	3:00	16-2-1
For the vacant title of IWM World Super welterweight championship.
2000-11-01	Win	(France) Morad Sari	K-1 J-MAX 2000	Tokyo, Japan	KO (Left hook)	2	0:48	16-1-1
Wins Sari's title of ISKA Oriental World Welterweight World championship.
2000-07-26	Win	(Australia) Clayton Collier	Wolf Revolution First Wave	Japan	KO (Left jab)	1	1:15	15-1-1
2000-05-26	Win	(Philippines) Melchor Menor	Colosseum 2000	Japan	TKO (Referee Stoppage)	4	2:59	14-1-1
2000-04-16	Win	(Thailand) Kongnapa Sor.Chalermsak		Thailand	KO (Left uppercut)	2	1:00	13-1-1
1999-11-22	Win	(United States) Eval Denton	All Japan Kickboxing 1999: WAVE-XIII	Japan	Decision	5	3:00	12-1-1
1999-10-08	Win	(New Zealand) Nick Misich	All Japan Kickboxing 1999: WAVE-XII	Japan	Decision	5	3:00	11-1-1
1999-08-17	Win	(New Zealand) Steve Misich	All Japan Kickboxing 1999: WAVE-V	Japan	TKO (Doctor stoppage)	2	2:15	10-1-1
1999-07-13	Win	(Italy) Matteo Trevisian	All Japan Kickboxing 1999: WAVE-IV	Japan	Decision	5	3:00	9-1-1
1999-05-11	Win	(France) James Schaser	All Japan Kickboxing 1999: WAVE-III	Japan	Decision (Unanimous)	5	3:00	8-1-1
1999-03-17	Win	(Japan) Tomoharu Chiba	All Japan Kickboxing 1999: WAVE-II	Japan	KO (Left hook)	3	0:34	7-1-1
Wins the vacant title of All Japan Kickboxing Federation Welterweight Championship.
1999-01-25	Draw	(Japan) Hiroyuki Doi	All Japan Kickboxing 1999: WAVE-I	Japan	Decision draw	5	3:00	6-1-1
1998-11-14	Win	(Japan) Tetsumasa Shimamura	Shoot Boxing Ground Zero Tokyo	Tokyo, Japan	KO (Left hook)	1	2:32	6-1
1998-10-16	Win	(Japan) Junji Tsuboi	All Japan Kickboxing 1998	Japan	Decision	5	3:00	5-1
1998-09-19	Win	(Japan) K-Takahashi	All Japan Kickboxing 1998: Kick Champion's Night	Japan	Decision	4	3:00	4-1
1998-07-08	Win	(Japan) Takami Kawano	All Japan Kickboxing 1998	Japan	Decision	3	3:00	3-1
1998-03-22	Win	(Japan) Tomohiro Chiba	All Japan Kickboxing 1998	Japan	KO (Left hook)	3	3:00	2-1
1997-05-30	Loss	(Japan) Takayuki Kohiruimaki	All Japan Kickboxing 1997: KICK OVER-V	Japan	TKO (Referee stoppage)	3	2:52	1-1
1997-03-23	Win	(Japan) Hutoshi Takehara	All Japan Kickboxing 1997: KICK OVER-IV	Japan	KO (Right cross)	1	2:52	1-0
Legend: Win Loss Draw/No contest Notes

== Wolf Revolution ==
Wolf Revolution is an event promoted by Masato himself. It mixes live bands with MMA and kickboxing matches.

== Acting ==
Masato has appeared in films such as Izo, Buyuden, Dead or Alive 2: Birds, Shukyoku Ninja and Shamo.

== See also ==
- List of K-1 events
- List of K-1 champions
- List of male kickboxers
