= Virgil Kalakoda =

South African boxer

- Born: 24 December 1977 (age 48); Cape Town, South Africa
- Other names: The Conqueror, Victorious
- Height: 1.78 m (5 ft 10 in)
- Weight: 70 kg (154 lb; 11 st 0 lb)
- Division: Welterweight
- Style: Boxing
- Stance: Orthodox
- Fighting out of: Sydney, Australia
- Team: Full Body Impact Gym; Steve's Gym; Warrior's MMA Academy
- Trainer: Tony Del Vecchio; Steve Kalakoda
- Years active: 1996–present

Professional boxing record
- Total: 36
- Wins: 25
- By knockout: 16
- Losses: 8
- By knockout: 3
- Draws: 3

Kickboxing record
- Total: 20
- Wins: 10
- By knockout: 3
- Losses: 10
- By knockout: 5

Amateur record
- Total: 10
- Wins: 9
- Losses: 1

Other information
- Notable relatives: Steve Kalakoda, Father
- Boxing record from BoxRec
- Last updated on: 26 December 2011

Virgil "The Conqueror" Kalakoda (born 24 December 1979) is a South African welterweight boxer and kickboxer, fighting out of Full Body Impact Gym in Sydney, Australia. He is former a light-middleweight boxing contender and competed in K-1 MAX.

== Early career ==
Virgil grew up in Cape Town, South Africa. His dad Steve Kalakoda was a boxer and he used to go to the gym with him, and learnt by watching, since he was about 4 years old. Growing up around the likes of Mike Bernardo when he was in his K-1 prime was a huge influence to him.

He had 10 amateur boxing fights, with only one loss to Ruben Groenewald in the final of the national tryouts.

== Professional boxing career ==
Virgil turned pro in 1996 at 18 years of age defeating Patrick Ngqoba by TKO on his debut in Cape Town. He went undefeated for his first seven professional bouts before suffering his first loss to Pascal Mtungu in 1997. In 2000 Virgil had his first professional title fight losing to Joseph Makaringe by tenth round TKO for the South African welterweight title. Virgil responded well to this setback winning his next thirteen fights between 2000 and 2003 and picked up the International Boxing Council (IBC) light middleweight world title and I.B.F. and W.B.N. intercontinental light middleweight titles. He suffered his first defeat in four years when he lost via split decision to fellow South African William Gare in a non-title fight in Cape Town. After a win against Wahab Adebisi he decided to move into the world of kickboxing.

== Kickboxing career ==
Virgil made his K-1 MAX debut on 4 May 2005 at the K-1 World MAX 2005 World Tournament Open against former champion Albert Kraus with the prize being a place at the quarter-final stage of the 2005 K-1 MAX final. Virgil was unable to defeat the 2002 champion but impressed enough to be offered a super fight at the final event. After racking up a couple of wins with the promotion he was invited back the following year to take place in qualifying only to lose to the 2004 champion Buakaw Por. Pramuk. Once again Virgil impressed in the split decision extension round defeat and was invited to take part in the quarter-finals despite the loss. At the final he met Andy Souwer in the quarter-finals and suffered his first stoppage defeat.

Later that year Virgil made his first (and so far only) appearance in Shoot boxing's number one event – the S-Cup. He met fellow boxer Daniel Dawson in the quarter-final stage but was unable to proceed losing by unanimous decision. Despite early initial promise with the K-1 organization Virgil's record has been patchy – mixing good wins against the likes of Takayuki Kohiruimaki and Ole Laursen with a number of defeats including a shock loss against Se Ki Kim at the K-1 Fighting Network Khan in 2007.

== Titles ==
- 2002-03 W.B.N. light middleweight Inter-continental champion (2 title defences)
- 2002 I.B.F. light middleweight Inter-Continental champion
- 2001 IBC light middleweight world champion

== Kickboxing record ==
Kickboxing Record
10 Wins (3 (T)KO's), 10 Losses
Date	Result	Opponent	Event	Location	Method	Round	Time	Record
2010-06-06	Loss	(Japan) Hiroki Shishido	Shoot Boxing 25th Anniversary - Ishin 3rd Battle	Tokyo, Japan	KO (Straight Left)	3	2:15	10-10
2009-11-27	Win	(South Korea) Jae Gil Noh	The Khan 2	Seoul, South Korea	Ext.R Decision (Unanimous)	4	3:00	10-9
2009-11-20	Loss	(Turkey) Ali Gunyar	War of the Worlds	Melbourne, Australia	Decision (Unanimous)	3	3:00	9-9
2009-08-08	Win	(Japan) Kozo Mitsuyama	Xplosion Super Fight 19	Gold Coast, Australia	Ext.R KO (Punch)	4		9-8
2008-10-01	Loss	(Netherlands) Nieky Holzken	K-1 World MAX 2008 Final, Opening Fight	Tokyo, Japan	KO (Right Hook)	1	1:42	8-8
2008-05-31	Win	(Philippines) Ole Laursen	K-1 Scandinavia MAX 2008, Super Fight	Stockholm, Sweden	Ext.R Decision (Unanimous)	4	3:00	8-7
2008-04-09	Loss	(Japan) Masato	K-1 World MAX 2008 Final 16	Hiroshima, Japan	KO (Right Hook)	3	0:22	7-7
Fails to qualify for K-1 World MAX 2008 Final 8.
2008-02-24	Win	(South Korea) Se Ki Kim	K-1 Asia MAX 2008, Super Fight	Seoul, South Korea	Ext.R Decision (Split)	4	3:00	7-6
2007-10-03	Win	(Japan) Takayuki Kohiruimaki	K-1 World MAX 2007 Final, Reserve Fight	Tokyo, Japan	TKO (Referee Stoppage)	3	1:56	6-6
2007-07-21	Loss	(South Korea) Se Ki Kim	K-1 Fighting Network KHAN 2007	Seoul, South Korea	KO	2	1:48	5-6
2007-06-28	Loss	(Netherlands) Albert Kraus	K-1 World MAX 2007 Final Elimination	Tokyo, Japan	Decision (Unanimous)	3	3:00	5-5
Fails to qualify for K-1 World MAX 2007 Final although will be invited to take part in a reserve fight.
2007-04-04	Win	(Japan) Hiroyuki Maeda	K-1 MAX 2007 World Elite Showcase	Yokohama, Japan	Decision (Unanimous)	3	3:00	5-4
2006-11-03	Loss	(Australia) Daniel Dawson	S-Cup 2006, Quarter-finals	Tokyo, Japan	Decision (Unanimous)	3	3:00	4-4
2006-09-16	Win	(South Korea) Chi Bin Lim	K-1 KHAN 2006 Seoul	Seoul, South Korea	Ext.R Decision (Majority)	4	3:00	4-3
2006-09-04	Win	(Japan) Hiroyuki Maeda	K-1 World MAX 2006 Champions Challenge	Tokyo, Japan	TKO (Doc Stop/Cut)	2	0:33	3-3
2006-06-30	Loss	(Netherlands) Andy Souwer	K-1 World MAX 2006 Final, Quarter-finals	Yokohama, Japan	TKO (Ref Stop/3 Knockdowns)	3	2:23	2-3
2006-04-05	Loss	(Thailand) Buakaw Por.Pramuk	K-1 World MAX 2006 Open	Tokyo, Japan	Ext.R Decision (Split)	4	3:00	2-2
Despite defeat is invited to the K-1 World MAX 2006 Final to take part in the quarter-finals.
2006-02-25	Win	(Thailand) Sinbi Taewoong	K-1 KHAN 2006 Busan, Super Fight	Busan, South Korea	Ext.R Decision (Split)	4	3:00	2-1
2005-07-20	Win	(Japan) Yoshihiro Sato	K-1 World MAX 2005 Final, Super Fight	Yokohama, Japan	Decision (Majority)	3	3:00	1-1
2005-05-04	Loss	(Netherlands) Albert Kraus	K-1 World MAX 2005 Open	Tokyo, Japan	Decision (Unanimous)	3	3:00	0-1
Fails to qualify for K-1 World MAX 2005 Final although will be invited to take part in a super fight.
Legend: Win Loss Draw/No contest Notes

== Boxing record ==
Boxing Record
25 Wins (16 (T)KO's), 8 Losses, 3 Draws
Date	Result	Opponent	Venue	Location	Method	Round	Time	Record
2012-12-09	Loss	(Australia) Yao Yi Ma	Olympic Park Sports Centre	Homebush, Australia	TKO	8(12)	1:42	25-8-3
For IBF Pan Pacific light middleweight title.
2011-12-09	Loss	(Australia) Daniel Dawson	WA Italian Club	Perth, Australia	Decision (Majority)	12(12)	3:00	25-7-3
For vacant PABA light middleweight title. For vacant WBA Pan African light middleweight title.
2011-07-23	Draw	(Australia) Daniel Dawson	WA Italian Club	Perth, Australia	Decision (Split)	12(12)	3:00	25-6-3
For interim PABA light middleweight title.
2011-04-29	Draw	(Australia) John Akauola	Roundhouse	Kensington, New South Wales, Australia	Decision (Majority)	6(6)	3:00	25-6-2
2011-03-25	Loss	(Australia) Leroy Brown	Cronulla Sutherland Leagues Club	Cronulla, New South Wales, Australia	Decision (Unanimous)	6(6)	3:00	25-6-1
2009-10-30	Loss	(Australia) King Davidson	Roundhouse	Sydney, Australia	Decision (Unanimous)	12(12)	3:00	25-5-1
For vacant W.B.O. Africa light middleweight title.
2004-04-10	Win	(Nigeria) Wahab Adebisi	U.J. Esuene Stadium	Calabar, Nigeria	KO	2(10)		25-4-1
2004-01-27	Loss	(South Africa) William Gare	Ratanga Junction	Cape Town, South Africa	Decision (Split)	10(10)	3:00	24-4-1
2003-09-09	Win	(Finland) Kai Kauramaki	Club Albena	Varna, Bulgaria	Decision (Unanimous)	10(10)	3:00	24-3-1
2003-06-24	Win	(Bulgaria) Djemal Mehmedov	Sala Sporturilor Olympia	Ploiești, Romania	KO	1(10)		23-3-1
2003-03-04	Win	(Panama) Elvis Guerrero	Sala Sporturilor	Iaşi, Romania	Decision (Unanimous)	12(12)	3:00	22-3-1
Retains W.B.N. light middleweight Inter-continental title.
2002-12-10	Win	(Czech Republic) Tomas Kugler	Sala Sporturilor	Constanta, Romania	TKO	11(12)		21-3-1
Retains W.B.N. light middleweight Inter-continental title.
2002-10-29	Win	(Romania) Cristian Zamfir	Wynberg Military Sport Complex	Cape Town, South Africa	KO	1(8)		20-3-1
2002-07-09	Win	(Bulgaria) Stefan Dimitrov	Club Albena	Varna, Bulgaria	Decision (Unanimous)	12(12)	3:00	19-3-1
Wins inaugural W.B.N. light middleweight Inter-continental title.
2001-02-27	Win	(Cameroon) Dieudonne Takou Kotonang		Somerset West, South Africa	Decision (Unanimous)	12(12)	3:00	18-3-1
Wins vacant IBF light middleweight Inter-continental title.
2001-09-25	Win	(South Africa) Alex Cabinga	Wynberg Military Sport Complex	Cape Town, South Africa	TKO	5(6)		17-3-1
2001-06-08	Win	(Nigeria) Cyprian Emeti	Grand West Casino	Cape Town, South Africa	KO	2(12)	1:33	16-3-1
Wins vacant IBC light middleweight world title.
2001-02-27	Win	(Cameroon) Dieudonne Takou Kotonang	Parow Civic Centre	Cape Town, South Africa	TKO	2(6)		15-3-1
2001-01-27	Win	(United States) Altoria Horne	The Moon	Tallahassee, Florida, USA	Decision (Unanimous)	8(8)	3:00	14-3-1
2000-09-03	Win	(South Africa) Kholisile Mavatha	Bellville Velodrome	Cape Town, South Africa	TKO	2(10)		13-3-1
2000-08-13	Win	(South Africa) Morris Dakada	Wynberg Military Sport Complex	Cape Town, South Africa	KO	1(10)		12-3-1
2000-02-20	Loss	(South Africa) Joseph Makaringe	Wembley Indoor Arena	Johannesburg, South Africa	TKO	8(10)		11-3-1
For vacant South African welterweight title.
1999-09-24	Win	(England) Robert Wright	Rhydycar Leisure Centre	Merthyr Tydfil, Wales, UK	Decision	6(6)	3:00	11-2-1
1999-04-20	Loss	(Hungary) Zoltan Szili	Carousel Hotel & Casino	Temba, South Africa	KO	1(8)		10-2-1
1999-02-27	Win	(England) Paul Miles	York Hall	London, England, UK	Decision	6(6)	3:00	10-1-1
1998-11-09	Win	(South Africa) Oupa Ntshangulu	Carousel Hotel & Casino	Temba, South Africa	KO	1(6)		9-1-1
1998-07-28	Win	(South Africa) Andile Professor Blom	Carousel Hotel & Casino	Temba, South Africa	KO	1(6)		8-1-1
1998-02-21	Win	(South Africa) Andile Professor Blom	Great Centenary Hall	New Brighton, South Africa	TKO	4(6)		7-1-1
1997-11-08	Loss	(South Africa) Pascal Mtungu	Village Green	Durban, South Africa	Decision	4(4)	3:00	6-1-1
1997-10-08	Win	(South Africa) Thomas Pisan	Carousel Hotel & Casino	Temba, South Africa	Decision	4(4)	3:00	6-0-1
1997-08-28	Win	(South Africa) Michael Ramabele		Johannesburg, South Africa	Decision	4(4)	3:00	5-0-1
1997-08-23	Win	(South Africa) Zana Mlenzana	Nasrec Indoor Arena	Johannesburg, South Africa	Decision	6(6)	3:00	4-0-1
1997-06-28	Win	(South Africa) Zana Mlenzana	Nasrec Indoor Arena	Johannesburg, South Africa	TKO	3(6)	3:00	3-0-1
1996-07-21	Draw	(South Africa) Michael Mbasane	Wynberg Military Sports Centre	Cape Town, South Africa	Draw	4(4)	3:00	2-0-1
1996-05-12	Win	(South Africa) Sakhiwo Saxie Kilani		Cape Town, South Africa	TKO	1(4)		2-0
1996-03-17	Win	(South Africa) Patrick Ngqoba	3 Arts Theatre	Cape Town, South Africa	TKO	1(4)		1-0
Professional debut.
Legend: Win Loss Draw/No contest Notes

== See also ==
- List of male kickboxers
- List of K-1 Events
