= K-1 World MAX 2003 World Tournament final =

K-1 martial arts event in 2003

K-1 World MAX 2003 World Tournament Final
- Promotion: K-1
- Date: July 5, 2003
- Venue: Saitama Super Arena
- City: Saitama, Japan
- Attendance: 15,600

Event chronology
K-1 Beast II 2003	K-1 World MAX 2003 World Tournament Final	K-1 World Grand Prix 2003 in Fukuoka

K-1 World MAX 2003 World Tournament Final was a kickboxing event promoted by the K-1 organization. It was the second ever K-1 MAX final for middleweight kickboxers (70 kg/154 lb weight class) involving eight finalists and two reserve fighters, with all bouts fought under K-1 rules. The tournament fighters had qualified via preliminary tournaments, had been involved in the previous years final, or had been invited due to their achievements in kickboxing and Muay Thai (more information on the fighters is detailed by the bulleted list below). As well as tournament bouts there was also a super fight, also fought under K-1 rules. In total there were twelve fighters at the event, representing seven countries.

The tournament winner was the home favourite Masato who defeated reigning champion Albert Kraus by knockout, in what was a very entertaining event with five stoppages in the eight bouts. Both Masato and Kraus had challenging routes to the final with Masato having a close decision victory over Mike Zambidis and Kraus overcoming up and comer and future K-1 MAX champion Andy Souwer in the quarter-finals. The event was held in Saitama at the Saitama Super Arena, on Saturday, 5 July 2003.

Finalists

- Marfio Canoletti - K-1 MAX Brazil 2002 champion, W.K.N. Brazil Muay Thai champion
- (Netherlands) Albert Kraus - reigning K-1 World MAX 2002 champion, W.K.A. world champion '01
- (United States) Duane Ludwig - invitee, K-1 MAX USA 2002 champion, x2 I.K.F. U.S.A. national Muay Thai amateur champion
- Masato - K-1 MAX Japan 2003 champion, I.S.K.A. oriental rules welterweight world champion '00, A.J.K.F welterweight champion '99
- (Thailand) Sakeddaw Kiatputon - invitee, Rajadamnern Stadium champion
- (Netherlands) Andy Souwer - S-Cup 2002 champion, multiple Muay Thai and kickboxing world champion
- Kozo Takeda - K-1 MAX Japan 2003 runner up, former Rajadamnern Stadium champion
- (Greece) Mike Zambidis - K-1 Oceania MAX 2002 champion, multiple world champion (Kings of the Ring, W.O.K.A)

Reservists

- Yasuhiro Kazuya - K-1 MAX Japan 2003 3rd place, national karate champion
- (Russia) Viatcheslav Nesterov - invitee, Kyokushin Karate Oyama Cup 3rd place

== K-1 World MAX 2003 World Tournament Final ==
Quarter-finals
(Japan) Masato	DEC
(Greece) Mike Zambidis
(Brazil) Marfio Canoletti
(Thailand) Sakeddaw Kiatputon	DEC
(United States) Duane Ludwig	KO
(Japan) Kozo Takeda
(Netherlands) Albert Kraus	TKO
(Netherlands) Andy Souwer

Semi-finals
(Japan) Masato	KO
(Thailand) Sakeddaw Kiatputon
(United States) Duane Ludwig
(Netherlands) Albert Kraus	KO

Final
(Japan) Masato	KO
(Netherlands) Albert Kraus

== Results ==
K-1 World MAX 2003 World Tournament Final Results
K-1 World MAX Tournament Reserve Fight -70 kg: K-1 Rules / 3Min. 3R Ext.1R
(Japan) Yasuhiro Kazuya def. Viatcheslav Nesterov (Russia)
Kazuya defeated Nesterov by 3rd round Unanimous Decision 3-0.
K-1 World MAX Tournament Quarter-finals -70 kg: K-1 Rules / 3Min. 3R Ext.1R
(Japan) Masato def. Mike Zambidis (Greece)
Masato defeated Zambidis by 3rd round Split Decision 2-1.
(Thailand) Sakeddaw Kiatputon def. Marfio Canoletti (Brazil)
Kiatputon defeated Canoletti by 3rd round Unanimous Decision 3-0.
(United States) Duane Ludwig def. Kozo Takeda (Japan)
Ludwig defeated Takeda by KO (Left Hook) at 0:46 of the 2nd round.
(Netherlands) Albert Kraus def. Andy Souwer (Netherlands)
Kraus defeated Souwer by TKO (Doctor Stoppage, Cut) at 3:00 of the 1st round.
K-1 World MAX Tournament Semi-finals -70 kg: K-1 Rules / 3Min. 3R Ext.1R
(Japan) Masato def. Sakeddaw Kiatputon (Thailand)
Masato defeated Kiatputon by KO (Right Uppercut) at 2:55 of the 2nd round.
(Netherlands) Albert Kraus def. Duane Ludwig (United States)
Kraus defeated Ludwig by KO (Left Hook) at 1:33 of the 3rd round.
Super Fight -70 kg: K-1 Rules / 3Min. 3R Ext.1R
(Turkey) Serkan Yilmaz def. Takashi Ohno (Japan)
Yilmaz defeated Ohno by 3rd round Unanimous Decision 3-0.
K-1 World MAX Tournament Final -70 kg: K-1 Rules / 3Min. 3R Ext.2R
(Japan) Masato def. Albert Kraus (Netherlands)
Masato defeated Kraus by KO (Left Hook) at 2:26 of the 2nd round.

== See also ==
- List of K-1 events
- List of K-1 champions
- List of male kickboxers
