= Kozo Takeda =

Japanese actor and kickboxer (born 1972)

- Born: Kōzō Takeda; December 27, 1972 (age 53); Adachi, Tokyo, Japan
- Native name: 武田 幸三
- Other names: Chōgōkin (超合筋, Super Alloy Muscle)
- Nationality: Japanese
- Height: 1.73 m (5 ft 8 in)
- Weight: 70 kg (150 lb; 11 st)
- Division: Welterweight
- Style: Kickboxing, Karate
- Fighting out of: Misato, Saitama, Japan
- Team: Jiseikan
- Trainer: Kunimasa Nagae
- Rank: 5th dan black belt in Karate
- Years active: 1995–2009

Kickboxing record
- Total: 72
- Wins: 45
- By knockout: 34
- Losses: 20
- By knockout: 12
- Draws: 7

Other information
- Website: ameblo.jp/takeda-kozo/
- Last updated on: December 17, 2010

Kozo Takeda (Japanese: 武田幸三 Japanese pronunciation: [takeda koːzoː]; born December 27, 1972) is a Japanese actor and former welterweight kickboxer who was competing in K-1 MAX. He won Rajadamnern Stadium champion at welterweight in Muay Thai on January 21, 2001. He has made both the Welterweight and Super Welterweight Rajadamnern Stadium rankings. He is currently a chief adviser of International Sohgoh Budo Federation (ISBF) and he was certified as black belt of the 5th dan in karate by ISBF.

== Biography ==
=== Student era ===
Kozo Takeda was born in Adachi, Tokyo, Japan on December 27, 1972. He played rugby when he was in high school, and entered Kokushikan University by recommendation, but dropped out as soon as he watched bouts of Branko Cikatić fight K-1 on television. He started practicing kickboxing at the Jiseikan Gym in Saitama. He joined Seido-Kaikan and increased his weight to 90 kg to enter K-1 as a heavyweight kickboxer, but he rejoined Jiseikan and debuted as a welterweight kickboxer of Shin Nihon Kickboxing Association (SNKA) on March 19, 1995.

He became an actor post his kickboxing career.

== Fight record ==
Professional kickboxing record
72 Fights 45 Wins (34 KOs), 20 Losses, 7 Draws
Date	Result	Opponent	Event	Location	Method	Round	Time	Record
2010-05-16	Ex	(Japan) Yoshihiro Satō	SNKA "FINAL Takeda Kozo Retirement Memorial Event"	Bunkyō, Tokyo, Japan	No Decision	1	3:00	
2009-10-26	Loss	(Netherlands) Albert Kraus	K-1 World MAX 2009 World Championship Tournament Final, Super fight	Yokohama, Kanagawa, Japan	TKO (Cut)	2	2:19	72-45-20-7
2009-08-30	Ex	(Japan) Yōsuke Nishijima	SNKA "Brave Hearts 12"	Kōtō, Tokyo, Japan	No Decision	1	2:00	
2009-05-31	Win	(Thailand) Laitai Muay Thai Plaza	SNKA "Brave Hearts 11"	Bunkyō, Tokyo, Japan	Decision (Unanimous)	3	3:00	71-45-19-7
2009-01-18	Win	(Thailand) Litidet Wor.Slapol	SNKA "Brave Hearts 10"	Bunkyō, Tokyo, Japan	KO (leg kicks)	1	2:58	70-44-19-7
2008-12-31	Loss	(Japan) Tatsuya Kawajiri	Dynamite!! 2008	Saitama, Saitama, Japan	KO (Left hook)	1	2:47	69-43-19-7
2008-05-25	Win	(Scotland) Sean Wright	SNKA "Brave Hearts 8"	Bunkyō, Tokyo, Japan	Decision (2–0)	3	3:00	68-43-18-7
2008-01-20	Loss	(Australia) John Wayne Parr	SNKA "Brave Hearts 7"	Bunkyō, Tokyo, Japan	KO (Right hook)	4	1:20	67-42-18-7
The bout was for Parr's title of WKBA World Super welterweight championship.
2007-05-20	Win	(Thailand) Sanmuk Sippapon	SNKA BRAVE HEARTS 5	Tokyo, Japan	KO (Low Kick)	2	2:15	65-41-19-6
2007-04-04	Loss	(Greece) Mike Zambidis	K-1 World MAX 2007 World Elite Showcase	Yokohama, Japan	Decision (Unanimous)	3	3:00	64-40-19-6
2007-01-21	Win	(South Korea) Che Yon	SNKA BRAVE HEARTS 4	Tokyo, Japan	KO (Low Kick)	2	0:55	63-40-18-6
2006-06-30	Loss	(United States) Fernando Calleros	K-1 World MAX 2006 World Championship Final	Yokohama, Japan	Decision 3-0	3	3:00	62-39-18-6
2006-05-21	Draw	(Korea) Kim Song Sik	SNKA BRAVE HEARTS 2	Tokyo, Japan	Decision	3	3:00	61-39-17-6
2006-04-28	Loss	(Thailand) Jomtap Kransenmaharsarakarm	SNKA TITANS 3rd	Tokyo, Japan	Decision (Unanimous)	3	3:00	60-39-17-5
2005-12-18	Draw	(Thailand) Kondet Singpakor	SNKA FINAL 2005	Tokyo, Japan	Decision	3	3:00	59-39-16-5
2005-10-12	Loss	(Netherlands) Andy Souwer	K-1 World MAX 2005 Champions' Challenge	Tokyo, Japan	KO (Punches)	2	0:31	58-39-16-4
2005-08-22	Loss	(Australia) John Wayne Parr	SNKA "Titans 2nd"	Shibuya, Tokyo, Japan	KO (Right hook)	3	2:24	57-39-15-4
The bout was for the vacant title of WKBA World Super welterweight championship.
2005-05-29	Win	(Thailand) Fetpayak Saktawin	SNKA SLEDGE HAMMER	Tokyo, Japan	TKO (Low Kick)	1	0:33	56-39-14-4
2005-02-23	Win	(Japan) Kazuyuki Miyata	K-1 World MAX 2005 Japan Tournament	Tokyo, Japan	KO	3	0:39	56-38-14-4
2005-01-16	Win	(Thailand) Techakarin Chuwattana	SNKA ONWARD OPERATION II	Tokyo, Japan	TKO (Leg Injury)	3		55-37-14-4
2004-10-13	Loss	(Thailand) Buakaw Por. Pramuk	K-1 World MAX 2004 Champions' Challenge	Tokyo, Japan	2 Ext R. Decision (Unanimous)	5	3:00	54-36-14-4
2004-07-11	Loss	(Thailand) Techakarin Chuwattana	SNKA Full Spark's Part 2	Tokyo, Japan	TKO (Doctor Stoppage)	1	2:44	53-36-13-4
2004-07-11	Win	(Thailand) Petnakun Sor.Saluaisamchok	SNKA MAGNUM 5	Tokyo, Japan	Disqualification	2		52-36-12-4
2004-05-30	Win	(Thailand) Chuchai Bor.Chor.Ror.Sorn	SNKA Super-Hybrid	Tokyo, Japan	KO (Right Cross)	2	0:07	51-35-12-4
2004-02-24	Loss	(Japan) Takayuki Kohiruimaki	K-1 World MAX 2004 Japan Tournament Semi Finals	Tokyo, Japan	KO (Flying Knee)	2	1:05	50-34-12-4
2004-02-24	Win	(Japan) Kenichi Ogata	K-1 World MAX 2004 Japan Tournament	Shibuya, Tokyo, Japan	TKO (Towel thrown)	1	3:00	49-34-11-4
2004-01-25	Win	(Mexico) Jose Garcia	SNKA Onward Operation	Tokyo, Japan	KO (Right Low Kick)	1	0:25	48-33-11-4
2003-09-07	Loss	(Australia) Paul Lee	SNKA Full Sparrk's	Tokyo, Japan	Decision (Majority)	5	3:00	47-32-11-4
2003-07-05	Loss	(United States) Duane Ludwig	K-1 World MAX 2003 World Tournament Final, Quarter Finals	Saitama, Japan	KO (Left Hook)	2	0:46	46-32-10-4
2003-03-01	Loss	(Japan) Masato	K-1 World MAX 2003 Japan Grand Prix, Final	Kōtō, Tokyo, Japan	Decision (Unanimous)	3	3:00	45-32-9-4
For the K-1 World Max 2008 Japan tournament title. Fails to qualify for K-1 World MAX 2008 Final 16.
2003-03-01	Win	(Japan) Yasuhiro Kazuya	K-1 World MAX 2003 Japan Grand Prix, Semi-final	Kōtō, Tokyo, Japan	Decision (Unanimous)	3	3:00	44-32-8-4
2003-03-01	Win	(Japan) Kojirō	K-1 World MAX 2003 Japan Grand Prix, Quarter-Final	Kōtō, Tokyo, Japan	Decision (Unanimous)	3	3:00	43-31-8-4
2003-01-26	Draw	(Thailand) Chaowalit Jockygym	SNKA DOWN BY LOW	Tokyo, Japan	Decision	5	3:00	42-30-8-4
2002-12-01	Draw	(Thailand) Petpayak Sor.Sungtong		Thailand	Decision	5	3:00	41-30-8-3
2002-09-22	Win	(Thailand) Mekkenar Sor.Kingstar	SNKA Advance Attack!	Tokyo, Japan	KO (Low kick)	1	1:12	40-30-8-2
2002-07-27	Loss	(Thailand) Burnan Sakhomsing	SNKA BREAK A WAY!	Tokyo, Japan	TKO (Doctor Stoppage)	3	1:11	39-29-8-2
2002-05-26	Loss	(Thailand) Sagetdao Kiatputon	SNKA LOCK ON!	Tokyo, Japan	KO (Left Cross)	1	0:58	38-29-7-2
2002-03-24	Win	(Thailand) Big Ben Nopparatfarm	SNKA GET FORWARD!	Tokyo, Japan	KO (Low Kick)	3	1:04	37-29-6-2
2002-01-27	Win	(Thailand) Saibetnoi Kiatsidar	SNKA STRIKE BACK!	Tokyo, Japan	KO (Low Kick)	3	0:19	36-28-6-2
2001-11-26	Win	(Thailand) Joknoi Davy	Rajadamnern Stadium	Bangkok, Thailand	TKO (Low Kick)	2		35-27-6-2
2001-09-16	Loss	(Thailand) Charnvit Kiat Tor.Bor.Ubon	SNKA "Take One"	Tokyo, Japan	TKO (Doctor stoppage/Cut)	3	3:00	34-26-6-2
Loses the Rajadamnern Stadium Welterweight championship.
2001-05-27	Win	(Thailand) Sitthichok Sor Upon	SNKA The Star Fleet	Bunkyō, Tokyo, Japan	KO (Low Kicks)	2	2:26	33-26-5-2
2001-03-31	Win	(Thailand) Kaoklai Kaennorsing	SNKA "Real Champion Appearance"	Bunkyō, Tokyo, Japan	Decision (Unanimous)	5	3:00	32-25-5-2
2001-01-21	Win	(Thailand) Chalarmdam Sittrattrakarn	SNKA	Tokyo, Japan	KO (Right hook)	2		31-24-5-2
Wins the Rajadamnern Stadium Welterweight championship.
2000-12-03	Loss	(Thailand) Chaowalit Jockygym	SNKA Fight to Muay-Thai 2000	Tokyo, Japan	Decision (Unanimous)	5	3:00	30-23-5-2
2000-10-28	Win	(Australia) Eugene Elkkeboom	SNKA ROAD TO MUAY-THAI 2000	Tokyo, Japan	KO (Right Hook)	1	1:16	29-23-4-2
2000-07-29	Win	(Thailand) Jacksin Chuwattana	SNKA NO KICK, NO LIFE	Tokyo, Japan	KO (Punches)	5	1:43	28-22-4-2
2000-05-05	Draw	(Thailand) Chalarmdam Sittrattrakarn	SNKA	Tokyo, Japan	Decision	5	3:00	27-21-4-2
For the Rajadamnern Stadium Welterweight championship.
2000-03-26	Win	(Thailand) Kongfak Lookmekrong	SNKA "Speed King"	Kōtō, Tokyo, Japan	KO (Punches)	2	1:29	26-21-4-1
2000-01-23	Win	(Japan) Masaru Kitazawa	SNKA "Double Impact"	Kōtō, Tokyo, Japan	Decision (Unanimous)	3	3:00	25-20-4-1
Retains title of SNKA Japanese Welterweight Championship.(1)
1999-11-28	Win	(Thailand) Yongsak Kungwanbrai	Rajadamnern Stadium	Bangkok, Thailand	KO	2		24-19-4-1
1999-10-30	Win	(United Kingdom) James Fler	SNKA "Road to Muay-Thai 2nd"	Kōtō, Tokyo, Japan	KO (3 Knockdowns/Low Kicks)	1	2:56	23-18-4-1
1999-07-24	Win	(Thailand) Chunchai Kaewsamrit	SNKA "Ha-Oh-Den"	Kōtō, Tokyo, Japan	TKO	2	1:53	22-17-4-1
1999-05-05	Win	(Thailand) Wanchai Ted-udom	SNKA "Japan-Thailand Battle PartIII -The big four Arrives-"	Kōtō, Tokyo, Japan	KO	2	1:49	21-16-4-1
1999-03-13	Win	(Thailand) Darnsai Suito-or	SNKA	Kōtō, Tokyo, Japan	KO	1	1:38	20-15-4-1
1999-01-30	Loss	(Thailand) Artsnalong Borkhorsor	SNKA	Kōtō, Tokyo, Japan	Decision (Unanimous)	3	3:00	19-14-4-1
1998-10-31	Loss	(Thailand) Payaklek Yutakit	SNKA	Kōtō, Tokyo, Japan	Decision (2–0)	3	3:00	18-14-3-1
1998-09-20	Win	(Japan) Shigeo Takasugi	SNKA	Koshigaya, Saitama, Japan	TKO (Corner Stop/Low Kicks)	4	2:25	17-14-2-1
1998-07-25	Win	(Japan) Yoshihiro Teraoka	SNKA	Kōtō, Tokyo, Japan	KO (Right hook)	2	2:23	16-13-2-1
1998-06-14	Win	(Thailand) Chentainoi Sor.Gedalinchai	SNKA	Akishima, Tokyo, Japan	Decision (2–0)	3	3:00	15-12-2-1
1998-05-05	Win	(Australia) Jay Duncan	SNKA	Kōtō, Tokyo, Japan	KO (Low Kick)	2		14-11-2-1
1998-04-19	Win	(South Korea) Song-O Yuh	SNKA	Koshigaya, Saitama, Japan	KO (Left hook)	1	1:35	13-10-2-1
1998-01-31	Win	(United States) Fernando Calleros	SNKA	Kōtō, Tokyo, Japan	KO	3		12-9-2-1
1997-10-18	Loss	(Thailand) Plawei Chuwattana	SNKA	Kōtō, Tokyo, Japan	KO	3	0:13	11-9-1-1
1997-08-02	Win	(South Korea) Jung-I Park	SNKA	Koshigaya, Saitama, Japan	KO	2	2:00	10-9-0-1
1997-06-27	Win	(Thailand) Jalwat Oenjai	SNKA	Ichihara, Chiba, Japan	KO	1	1:50	9-8-0-1
1997-03-09	Win	(Australia) Joe Sexton	SNKA	Kōtō, Tokyo, Japan	KO	2	1:17	8-7-0-1
1997-01-11	Win	(Japan) Keizō Matsuba	SNKA	Kōtō, Tokyo, Japan	TKO	3	0:26	7-6-0-1
Wins vacant title of SNKA Japanese Welterweight Championship.
1996-12-01	Win	(Japan) Hiromi Terada	SNKA	Aichi, Japan	KO	2	3:00	6-5-0-1
1996-09-21	Win	(Japan) Katsumori Maita	SNKA	Koshigaya, Saitama, Japan	Decision (2–0)	3	3:00	5-4-0-1
1996-05-25	Win	(Japan) Yūto Ōhira	SNKA	Tsu, Mie, Japan	KO	3		4-3-0-1
1996-04-29	Win	(Japan) Susumu Iwama	SNKA	Kōtō, Tokyo, Japan	Decision (Unanimous)	3	3:00	3-2-0-1
1995-03-31	Draw	(Japan) Toshiyuki Kinami	SNKA	Kōtō, Tokyo, Japan	Decision (0-0)	3	3:00	2-1-0-1
1995-03-19	Win	(Japan) Tadao Sugiyama	SNKA	Japan	KO	3	3:00	1-1-0-0
Legend: Win Loss Draw/No contest Notes

== Titles ==
- 2003 K-1 World MAX Japan tournament runner-up
- 2001 Rajadamnern Stadium Welterweight champion
- Shin Nihon Kickboxing Association Welterweight champion

== Filmography ==
- Sanada Maru (2016, TV), Ōno Harufusa
- Awaiting Kirin (2021, TV), Hongan-ji Kennyo
- The Legend and Butterfly (2023, Film), Mori Yoshinari
- What Will You Do, Ieyasu? (2023, TV), Hachisuka Iemasa
- Yuko Side B, and Hereafter (2025, Film)

== See also ==
- List of male kickboxers
- List of K-1 events
