= K-1 World MAX 2004 World Tournament final =

K-1 martial arts event in 2004

K-1 World MAX 2004 World Tournament Final
- Promotion: K-1
- Date: July 7, 2004
- Venue: Yoyogi National Gymnasium
- City: Tokyo, Japan
- Attendance: 14,819

Event chronology
K-1 Beast 2004 in Shizuoka	K-1 World MAX 2004 World Tournament Final	Kings of Oceania 2004

K-1 World MAX 2004 World Tournament Final was a kickboxing and martial arts event promoted by the K-1 organization. It was the third K-1 MAX final for middleweight kickboxers (70 kg/154 lb weight class) involving eight finalists and two reserve fighters, with all bouts fought under K-1 rules. Seven of the eight finalists had won elimination fights at the K-1 World MAX 2004 World Tournament Open, while the last finalist and both reserve fighters were invited despite suffering defeats. As well as tournament matches there was also an opening fight, fought under K-1 rules and a super fight fought under K-1 mixed rules (2 rounds of kickboxing, 2 rounds of MMA). In total there were fourteen fighters at the event, representing nine countries.

The tournament winner was Buakaw Por. Pramuk who won the ten million yen first prize by defeating reigning K-1 MAX champion and pre-tournament favourite Masato in the final by unanimous decision after an extra extension round. It was an excellent victory for the relatively unknown Thai who would burst on to the global kickboxing scene and would go on to become a real force in the middleweight division. The other notable result saw popular local MMA fighter Norifumi "Kid" Yamamoto defeat kickboxer Yasuhiro Kazuya in their special MMA vs kickboxing match. The event was held in Tokyo at the Yoyogi National Gymnasium, on Wednesday, 7 July 2004 in front of 14,000 spectators.

== K-1 World MAX 2004 World Tournament Final ==
K-1 World MAX Open
(Portugal) Paolo Balicha
(Japan) Takayuki Kohiruimaki	DEC
(Japan) Hayato
(Greece) Mike Zambidis	DEC
(United States) Duane Ludwig
(Australia) John Wayne Parr	DEC
(Thailand) Buakaw Por. Pramuk	DEC
(New Zealand) Jordan Tai
(Japan) Masato	DEC
(Turkey) Serkan Yilmaz
(Brazil) Marfio Canoletti
(Russia) Shamil Gaidarbekov	DEC
(Netherlands) Albert Kraus	DEC
(Mongolia) Jadamba Narantungalag

Quarter Finals
(Japan) Takayuki Kohiruimaki	DEC
(Greece) Mike Zambidis
(Australia) John Wayne Parr
(Thailand) Buakaw Por. Pramuk	DEC
(Japan) Masato	DEC
(Mongolia) Jadamba Narantungalag *
(Russia) Shamil Gaidarbekov
(Netherlands) Albert Kraus	DEC

Semi Finals
(Japan) Takayuki Kohiruimaki
(Thailand) Buakaw Por. Pramuk	KO
(Japan) Masato	DEC
(Netherlands) Albert Kraus

Final
(Thailand) Buakaw Por. Pramuk	DEC
(Japan) Masato

* Despite defeat Jadamba Narantungalag is invited to tournament as finalist

== Results ==
K-1 World MAX 2004 World Tournament Final Results
Opening Fight -70 kg: K-1 Rules / 3Min. 3R
(Japan) Takashi Ohno def. Vincent Swaans (Netherlands)
Ohno defeated Swaans by TKO (Referee Stoppage) at 2:56 of the 1st Round.
K-1 World MAX Tournament Reserve Fight -70 kg: K-1 Rules / 3Min. 3R Ext.1R
(United States) Duane Ludwig def. Serkan Yilmaz (Turkey)
Ludwig defeated Yilmaz by 3rd Round Unanimous Decision 3-0 (28-27, 30-29, 30-28).
K-1 World MAX Tournament Quarter Finals -70 kg: K-1 Rules / 3Min. 3R Ext.1R
(Japan) Takayuki Kohiruimaki def. Mike Zambidis (Greece)
Kohiruimaki defeated Zambidis by 3rd Round Unanimous Decision 3-0 (30-28, 29-28, 29-28).
(Thailand) Buakaw Por. Pramuk def. John Wayne Parr (Australia)
Por. Pramuk defeated Parr by Extra Round Split Decision 2-1 (10-9, 9-10, 10-9). After 3 rounds it was scored a draw (30-30, 30-30, 30-30).
(Japan) Masato def. Jadamba Narantungalag (Mongolia)
Masato defeated Narantungalag by 3rd Round Majority Decision 2-0 (30-29, 30-30, 30-29).
(Netherlands) Albert Kraus def. Shamil Gaidarbekov (Russia)
Kraus defeated Gaidarbekov by 3rd Round Majority Decision 2-0 (30-29, 30-30, 30-29).
K-1 World MAX Tournament Semi Finals -70 kg: K-1 Rules / 3Min. 3R Ext.1R
(Thailand) Buakaw Por. Pramuk def. Takayuki Kohiruimaki (Japan)
Por. Pramuk defeated Kohiruimaki by KO (Knees) at 0:42 of the 2nd Round.
(Japan) Masato def. Albert Kraus (Netherlands)
Masato defeated Kraus by 3rd Round Unanimous Decision 3-0 (29-28, 29-28, 30-28).
Super Fight -70 kg: K-1 Special Mixed Rules / 3Min. 4R
(Japan) Norifumi Yamamoto def. Yasuhiro Kazuya (Japan)
Yamamoto defeated Kazuya by Submission (Armbar) at 2:40 of the 2nd Round.
K-1 World MAX Tournament Final -70 kg: K-1 Rules / 3Min. 3R Ext.2R
(Thailand) Buakaw Por. Pramuk def. Masato (Japan)
Por. Pramuk defeated Masato by Extra Round Unanimous Decision 3-0. After 3 rounds the judges had scored it a draw.

== See also ==
- List of K-1 events
- List of K-1 champions
- List of male kickboxers
