= K-1 World MAX 2008 World Championship Tournament final =

K-1 kickboxing events in 2008

K-1 World MAX 2008 World Championship Tournament Final
- The poster for K-1 World MAX 2008 World Championship Tournament Final
- Promotion: K-1
- Date: October 1, 2008
- Venue: Nippon Budokan
- City: Tokyo, Japan
- Attendance: 15,321

Event chronology
K-1 World Grand Prix 2008 in Seoul Final 16	K-1 World MAX 2008 World Championship Tournament Final	K-1 Scandinavia Rumble of the Kings 2008

K-1 World MAX 2008 World Championship Tournament - Final - was a martial arts event promoted by the K-1 organization. It took place on Wednesday, October 1, 2008 at the Nippon Budokan Arena in Tokyo, Japan. It was the 7th annual K-1 World Max (70 kg/154 lbs weight class) World Championship Final, featuring four quarter final winners of K-1 World MAX 2008 Final 8 held on July 7, 2008 in Tokyo, Japan. The card also included a couple of tournament reserve bouts, two Superfights between Takayuki Kohiruimaki vs Joerie Mes and Nieky Holzken vs. Virgil Kalakoda, the ISKA World Lightweight Title Match plus the quarterfinals in K-1's new Koshien King of U-18 series. The four quarter final winners of the K-1 Koshien bouts would qualify for the semi-finals at the Dynamite!! 2008 event.

The K-1 World Max 2008 Final attracted a sellout crowd of 15,321 to the Nippon Budokan and was broadcast live in Japan on the TBS network.

== Rule changes ==
In a press conference at Tokyo's Laforet Hotel, prior to the event, the Event Producer Sadaharu Tanikawa announced a number of rule changes effective on October 1, 2008.

- K-1 World MAX fighter costumes may not cover the body below the knee or above the waist.
- No oil, lotion or potentially stimulative or irritating substances can be applied to any part of the body. Only a minimal amount of vaseline can only be applied to the face and ears.
- Introducing an "open-scoring" system, whereby the judges' cards will be revealed for the fighters and their cornermen as well as fans at the conclusion of each round.

== K-1 World MAX 2008 Tournament ==
Final 16
(Japan) Masato	KO
(South Africa) Virgil Kalakoda
(Armenia) Gago Drago	KO
(Northern Mariana Islands) Gori (kickboxer)
(Japan) Yoshihiro Sato	DEC
(Turkey) Murat Direkci
(Thailand) Buakaw Por. Pramuk	DEC
(Netherlands) Albert Kraus
(Netherlands) Andy Souwer	KO
(Greece) Mike Zambidis
(Italy) Rosario Presti
(South Africa) Warren Stevelmans	KO
(South Korea) Chi Bin Lim
(Japan) Yasuhiro Kido	KO
(Ukraine) Artur Kyshenko	DEC
(New Zealand) Jordan Tai

Final 8
(Japan) Masato	DEC
(Armenia) Gago Drago
(Japan) Yoshihiro Sato	KO
(Thailand) Buakaw Por. Pramuk
(Netherlands) Andy Souwer	DEC
(South Africa) Warren Stevelmans
(Japan) Yasuhiro Kido
(Ukraine) Artur Kyshenko	DEC

Final 4
(Japan) Masato	DEC
(Japan) Yoshihiro Sato
(Netherlands) Andy Souwer
(Ukraine) Artur Kyshenko	DEC

Final
(Japan) Masato	DEC
(Ukraine) Artur Kyshenko

== Results ==
- Opening Fight: K-1 Rules / 3Min. 3R Ext.1R

Nieky Holzken (Netherlands) def. Virgil Kalakoda (South Africa)
Holzken defeated Kalakoda by KO (Right Hook) at 1:42 of the 1st round.

- K-1 Koushien Final 8 (60 kg): K-1 Rules / 3Min. 3R

Koya Urabe (Japan) def. Yusuke Tsuboi (Japan)
Urabe defeated Tsuboi by TKO (Corner Stoppage) at 0:54 of the 3rd round.

Shota Shimada (Japan) def. Ryo Murakoshi (Japan)
Shimada defeated Murakoshi by 3rd round Unanimous Decision 3-0 (30-26, 30-26, 30-26).

Ryuya Kusakabe (Japan) def. Daizo Sasaki (Japan)
Kusakabe defeated Sasaki by TKO at 2:43 of the 1st round.

Hiroya (Japan) def. Taishi Hiratsuka (Japan)
Hiroya defeated Hiratsuka by KO (Left Hook) at 0:24 of the 1st round.

- Super Fights: K-1 Rules / 3Min. 3R Ext.1R

Joerie Mes (Netherlands) def. Taishin Kohiruimaki (Japan)
Mes defeated Kohiruimaki by KO (Left Hook) at 2:59 of the 3rd round.

- Reserve Fight 1: K-1 MAX Rules / 3Min. 3R Ext.1R

Albert Kraus (Netherlands) def. Yasuhiro Kido (Japan)
Kraus defeated Kido by TKO (Doctor Stoppage) at 0:48 of the 2nd round.

- Semi-finals: K-1 MAX Rules / 3Min. 3R Ext.1R

Masato (Japan) def. Yoshihiro Sato (Japan)
Masato defeated Sato by Extra Round Unanimous Decision 3-0 (10-9, 10-9, 10-9). After 3 rounds the judges scored it a Majority Draw 1-0 (29-28, 28-28, 28-28) in favour of Sato.

Artur Kyshenko (Ukraine) def. Andy Souwer (Netherlands)
Kyshenko defeated Souwer by Extra Round Unanimous Decision 3-0 (10-9, 10-9, 10-9). After 3 rounds the judges scored it a Decision Draw 0-0, (30-30, 30-30, 30-30).

- Reserve Fight 2: K-1 MAX Rules / 3Min. 3R Ext.1R

Buakaw Por. Pramuk (Thailand) def. Kultar Gill (India)
Por. Pramuk defeated Gill by KO (Right Hook) at 2:18 of the 1st round.

- Super Fight (60 kg): K-1 Rules / 3Min. 3R Ext.1R

Haruaki Otsuki (Japan) def. Ryuji Kajiwara (Japan)
Otsuki defeated Kajiwara by 3rd round Unanimous Decision 3-0 (30-28, 30-28, 30-28).

- ISKA Lightweight World Title Fight (60 kg): Kickboxing Rules / 3Min. 3R Ext.2R

Daisuke Uematsu (Japan) def. Susumu Daiguji (Japan)
Uematsu defeated Daiguji by KO (Left Knee) at 0:29 of the 1st round.

- Final: K-1 MAX Rules / 3Min. 3R Ext.2R

Masato (Japan) def. Artur Kyshenko (Ukraine)
Masato defeated Kyshenko by Extra Round Unanimous Decision 3-0 (10-9, 10-9, 10-9). After 3 rounds the judges scored it a Majority Draw 1-0 (28-28, 28-27, 28-28) in favor of Masato. Masato is the K-1 World MAX 2008 tournament champion.

== See also ==
- List of K-1 Events
- List of male kickboxers
