= Daniel Dawson =

Australian boxer, kickboxer and muay thai fighter

- Born: 15 October 1977 (age 49); Kalgoorlie, Western Australia, Australia
- Other names: The Rock
- Nationality: Australian
- Height: 1.76 m (5 ft 9 in)
- Weight: 70 kg (154 lb; 11 st)
- Division: Light middleweight
- Reach: 69.5 in (177 cm)
- Style: Muay Thai, kickboxing, boxing
- Stance: Orthodox
- Fighting out of: Perth, Western Australia, Australia

Professional boxing record
- Total: 46
- Wins: 40
- By knockout: 26
- Losses: 5
- By knockout: 1
- Draws: 1

Kickboxing record
- Total: 68
- Wins: 54
- By knockout: 31
- Losses: 14

Other information
- Occupation: Personal trainer and master combat sports striking coach

Daniel "The Rock" Dawson (born 15 October 1977) is an Australian super welterweight kickboxer and boxer, fighting out of Perth, Western Australia.

== Boxing career ==
Dawson has a boxing record of 40 wins, five losses, and one draw. He made history in 2013 when he won the World Boxing Foundation light middleweight title, becoming the first man in history to win world titles in Muay Thai, kickboxing and boxing.

Dawson made his professional boxing debut on 9 November 2002, defeating Michael Kilmurray by seventh-round technical knockout.

He captured his first title when he defeated Frank Marzano by seventh-round technical knockout for the West Australia light middleweight championship.

== Kickboxing career ==
Daniel has had a successful kickboxing career, and has fought in matches from Australia, China, Thailand, Hawaii, New Zealand, the United States, and Japan. He has fought under a diverse range of styles including Muay Thai, K-1 and shoot boxing. In his career as a kickboxer, he has fought and beaten fighters in the Oceania region, Japan, and the world, picking up victories against John Wayne Parr, Sam Soliman, Taishin Kohiruimaki, Kenichi Ogata, Shane Chapman and Jordan Tai.

Dawson is a former two time world champion, having held both the I.S.K.A. and World Muay Thai Association W.M.T.A belts, having defended them a total of seven times. He has also done well in tournaments, being the back-to-back Judgement Day Oceania eight man tournament winner in 2001 and 2002.

In 2016, Dawson reportedly returned to Muay Thai.

On 14 October 2016, he fought John Wayne Parr in Perth, Western Australia. On 8 September 2018, he made his debut for ONE Championship, where he lost to Mustapha Haida in the third round at ONE Championship: Beyond the Horizon. On 17 May 2019, Dawson defeated Brown Pinas by split decision at ONE Championship: Enter the Dragon in an alternate bout for the ONE Featherweight Kickboxing World Grand Prix.

== Titles ==
Boxing

- World Boxing Foundation
  - 2013 WBF world light middleweight champion
  - 2004 WBF International middleweight champion
- Pan Asian Boxing Association
  - 2012 PABA light middleweight champion (2 title defences)
  - 2011 PABA light middleweight champion
  - 2011 PABA Interim light middleweight champion
  - 2009 PABA light middleweight champion
  - 2008 PABA light middleweight champion (3 title defences)
  - 2007 PABA light middleweight champion (1 title defence, then vacated due to world title fight)
  - 2004 PABA light middleweight champion (0 title defences – vacated)
- World Boxing Association
  - 2011 WBA Pan African light middleweight champion
  - 2008 WBA Pan African light middleweight champion
- International Boxing Federation
  - 2009 IBF Pan Pacific light middleweight champion
- Australian National Boxing Federation
  - 2004 Australian light middleweight champion
  - 2003 Australian light middleweight champion (0 title defences – moved up in weight)
  - 2003 West Australia light middleweight champion (1 title defence)
- World Boxing Organization
  - 2004 WBO Asia Pacific light middleweight champion

Kickboxing

- Judgement Day
  - 2003 Judgement Day 3 "Super 8 Eliminator" tournament champion -72 kg
  - 2002 Judgement Day 2 "Super 8 Eliminator" tournament champion -72 kg
- World Muay Thai Association
  - 2001 World Muay Thai Association WMTA Kickboxing super welterweight world champion
  - 2001 World Muay Thai Association WMTA Muaythai super welterweight world champion (2 title defences)
- International Sport Karate Association
  - 2001 ISKA Muaythai super welterweight world champion (2 title defences)
  - 2000 ISKA Muaythai super welterweight world champion

== Kickboxing record ==
Kickboxing record
54 wins (31 (T)KOs), 13 losses
Date	Result	Opponent	Event	Location	Method	Round	Time
2019-05-17	Win	(Netherlands) Brown Pinas	ONE Championship: Enter the Dragon	Kallang, Singapore	Decision (split)	3	3:00
2018-09-08	Loss	(Morocco) Mustapha Haida	ONE Championship: Beyond The Horizon	Shanghai, China	KO (straight left)	3	2:14
2016-10-14	Loss	(Australia) John Wayne Parr	Origins 8: Dawson vs JWP III	Perth, Western Australia	Decision (unanimous)	5	3:00
2008-10-24	Loss	(Australia) Bruce Macfie	No Contest Thai Boxing Challenge '08	Brisbane, Australia	Decision (unanimous)	5	3:00
2008-03-03	Loss	(Greece) Mike Zambidis	No Respect 4	Melbourne, Australia	Decision (split)	5	3:00
Fight was for A-1 World Combat Cup super welterweight world title.
2007-06-22	Win	(Australia) Bruce Macfie	X-Plosion 16 Super Fights	Gold Coast, Australia	TKO (ref stop/3 knockdowns)	3	
2007-03-25	Win	(New Zealand) Jordan Tai	K-1 MAX '07 World Elite Showcase	Yokohama, Japan	Decision (unanimous)	3	3:00
2006-11-03	Loss	(Netherlands) Andy Souwer	S-Cup 2006, Semi Final	Tokyo, Japan	Decision (unanimous)	3	3:00
2006-11-03	Win	(South Africa) Virgil Kalakoda	S-Cup 2006, Quarter Final	Tokyo, Japan	Decision (unanimous)	3	3:00
2006-03-18	Win	(South Korea) Park Byoung Kyu	X-Plosion 13 Super Fights	Sydney, Australia	Decision (unanimous)	3	3:00
2003-11-18	Win	(Japan) Kojiro	K-1 World MAX 2003 Champions' Challenge	Tokyo, Japan	Decision (majority)	3	3:00
2003-02-02	Win	(Belgium) Gunther Baelen	Shoot Boxing "S" Of The World Vol.1	Tokyo, Japan	Decision (unanimous)	5	3:00
2002-12-15	Win	(Australia) Ryland Mahoney	X-Plosion Boonchu S-Cup	Gold Coast, Australia	KO	4	
2002-09-00	Win	(Australia) Jeremy Allen	Judgement Day 3, Final	Melbourne, Australia	2 ext.R TKO	5	
Wins Judgement Day 3 "Super 8 Eliminator" tournament -70 kg.
2002-09-00	Win	(Australia) Warren Elson	Judgement Day 3, Semi Final	Melbourne, Australia	TKO (kick)	1	
2002-09-00	Win	(Morocco) Hamid Boujaoub	Judgement Day 3, Quarter Final	Melbourne, Australia	TKO (kicks)	2	
2002-07-07	Loss	(China) Zheng Yuhao	S-Cup 2002, Semi Final	Yokohama, Japan	TKO (corner stop)	1	1:04
2002-07-07	Win	(Japan) Ryuji Goto	S-Cup 2002, Quarter Final	Yokohama, Japan	Decision (unanimous)	3	3:00
2001-11-20	Loss	(Japan) Hiroyuki Doi	Shoot Boxing: Be a Champ 4th Stage	Tokyo, Japan	Decision (unanimous)	3	3:00
2002-03-23	Loss	(Thailand) Jongsanan Fairtex	Master Toddy Show @ Stardust Casino	Las Vegas, NV, USA	Decision	5	3:00
2001-07-15	Win	(New Zealand) Shane Chapman	Judgement Day 2, Final	Melbourne, Australia	TKO	2	
Wins Judgement Day 2 "Super 8 Eliminator" tournament -70 kg.
2001-07-15	Win	(Australia) Sam Soliman	Judgement Day 2, Semi Final	Melbourne, Australia	Decision	3	3:00
2001-07-15	Win	(Australia) Andrew Keogh	Judgement Day 2, Quarter Final	Melbourne, Australia	TKO	2	2:15
2001-07-09	Win	(Japan) Kenichi Ogata	X-Plosion on Jupiter	Gold Coast, Australia	TKO (corner stop/knee to body)	3	
Retains W.M.T.A. super welterweight world title.
2001-01-12	Win	(Japan) Taishin Kohiruimaki	Wolf Revolution: 2nd Wave	Japan	Decision (majority)	5	3:00
2000-02-04	Win	(Australia) John Wayne Parr	Judgement Day Super 8, Quarter Final	Melbourne, Australia	Ext.R decision (unanimous)	4	3:00
Despite win, had to withdraw from tournament as too injured to continue.
1999-05-23	Loss	(Australia) John Wayne Parr	X-plosion I	Gold Coast, Australia	Decision (split)	3	5:00
Wins W.M.T.C. Muaythai junior middleweight Australian title.
Legend: Win Loss Draw/no contest Notes

== Professional boxing record ==
46 fights	40 wins	5 losses
By knockout	26	2
By decision	14	3
Draws	1	

No.	Result	Record	Opponent	Type	Round, time	Date	Location	Notes
46	Loss	40–5–1	(United States) Glen Tapia	TKO	3 (10)	2015-03-07	(Macau) Cotai Arena, Venetian Resort, Macao	For WBO–NABO light middleweight title
45	Loss	40–4–1	(United States) Austin Trout	UD	10	2014-08-22	(United States) Pechanga Resort & Casino, Temecula	
44	Win	40–3–1	(Democratic Republic of the Congo) Alex Bunema	UD	12	2013-09-20	(Australia) WA Italian Club, Perth	Retained PABA light middleweight title and won vacant WBF light middleweight title
43	Win	39–3–1	(Philippines) Eusebio Baluarte	TKO	4 (12)	2012-12-16	(Australia) WA Italian Club, Perth	Retained PABA light middleweight title
42	Win	38–3–1	(Indonesia) Marco Tuhumury	KO	5 (12)	2012-08-17	(Australia) WA Italian Club, Perth	Retained PABA light middleweight title
41	Win	37–3–1	(South Africa) Virgil Kalakoda	MD	12	2011-12-09	(Australia) WA Italian Club, Perth	Won vacant WBA Pan African and PABA light middleweight titles
40	Draw	36–3–1	(South Africa) Virgil Kalakoda	SD	12	2011-07-23	(Australia) WA Italian Club, Perth	For interim PABA light middleweight title
39	Win	36–3	(Philippines) Arnel Tinampay	MD	8	2011-03-12	(Australia) WA Italian Club, Perth	
38	Win	35–3	(United States) Jason LeHoullier	UD	8	2010-12-12	(Australia) WA Italian Club, Perth	
37	Loss	34–3	(Australia) Frank LoPorto	UD	12	2010-10-09	(Australia) Joondalup Arena, Joondalup	Won vacant PABA light middleweight title
36	Loss	34–2	(Ukraine) Serhiy Dzyndzyruk	TKO	10 (12)	2010-05-14	(United States) Chumash Casino, Santa Ynez	For WBO light middleweight title
35	Win	34–1	(Argentina) Ariel Gerardo Aparicio	KO	3 (12)	2009-02-01	(Australia) WA Italian Club, Perth	Retained PABA light middleweight title and won IBF Pan Pacific light middleweight title
34	Win	33–1	(Thailand) Plaisakda Singwancha	KO	1 (12)	2008-10-11	(Australia) Perth Convention Centre, Perth	Retained PABA light middleweight title
33	Win	32–1	(South Africa) Welcome Ntshingila	UD	12	2008-09-20	(Australia) Courtside Multisports Complex, Canning Vale, Perth	Retained PABA light middleweight title
32	Win	31–1	(Thailand) Dechapon Suwannalert	KO	2 (10)	2008-07-12	(Australia) Craigie Leisure Centre, Craigie, Perth	
31	Win	30–1	(Thailand) Sintung Kietbusaba	TKO	8 (12)	2008–05-04	(Australia) Goldfields Oasis Recreation Centre, Kalgoorlie	Won vacant PABA light middleweight title
30	Loss	29–1	(Australia) Daniel Geale	UD	12	2007-12-14	(Australia) Wests Campbelltown, Leumeah	For IBO middleweight title
29	Win	29–0	(Australia) Anton Solopov	KO	1 (12)	2007-08-31	(Australia) Croatian Club, Punchbowl, Sydney	Retained PABA light middleweight title
28	Win	28–0	(New Zealand) Lee Oti	KO	5 (12)	2007-04-28	(Australia) ords Sports Club, Subiaco, Perth	Won vacant PABA light middleweight title
27	Win	27–0	(Thailand) Saknarong Chachotirat	TKO	2 (6)	2007-03-24	(Australia) Herb Graham Rec & Fit Centre, Mirrabooka, Perth	
26	Win	23–2–1	(Thailand) Jakkrit Suwannalert	UD	6	2007-02-17	(Australia) Oasis Leisure Centre, Belmont, Perth	
25	Win	22–2–1	(Fiji) Abhay Chand	KO	1 (12)	2006-12-02	(Australia) Craigie Leisure Centre, Craigie, Perth	
24	Draw	24–0	(Philippines) Dindo Castanares	TKO	2 (8)	2006-09-20	(Australia) Challenge Stadium, Perth	
23	Win	23–0	(Thailand) Mike Wanprasert	TKO	4 (8)	2005-12-11	(Australia) Challenge Stadium, Perth	
22	Win	22–0	(Australia) Josh Clenshaw	UD	10	2005-08-07	(Australia) Panthers World of Entertainment, Penrith	
21	Win	21–0	(Paraguay) Jorge Dario David Gomez	UD	8	2005–07–03	(Australia) Challenge Stadium, Perth	
20	Win	20–0	(Indonesia) David Koswara	UD	10	2005-04-22	(Indonesia) Britama Arena, Kelapa Gading, Jakarta	Won PABA super featherweight title
19	Win	19–0	(Indonesia) Jack Sloday	KO	5 (10)	2005-03-05	(Australia) Hellenic Community Centre, Northbridge	
18	Win	18–0	(Australia) Josh Clenshaw	UD	10	2004-12-12	(Australia) Panthers World of Entertainment, Penrith	Won Australian middleweight title
17	Win	17–0	(Thailand) Fahbancha Siththaroon	KO	1 (6)	2004-10-13	(Australia) Sports Complex, Carrara, Gold Coast	
16	Win	16–0	(Thailand) Chaowalit Jockygym	TKO	2 (8)	2004-09-08	(Australia) E.G. Whitlam Recreation Center, Liverpool	
15	Win	15–0	(Kenya) Fred Kinuthia	RTD	8 (12)	2004-07-09	(Australia) Badgery's Pavilion, Homebush Bay, Sydney	Won WBO Asia Pacific light middleweight title
14	Win	14–0	(Australia) Ian McLeod	SD	12	2004-05-21	(Australia) Badgery's Pavilion, Homebush Bay, Sydney	Retained PABA light middleweight title
13	Win	13–0	(Australia) Nick Lundh	TKO	4 (12)	2004-03-21	(Australia) Challenge Stadium, Perth	Won vacant PABA light middleweight title
12	Win	12–0	(Indonesia) Elvin Marbun	KO	5 (12)	2004-02-15	(Australia) WA Italian Club, Perth	Won WBF International middleweight title
11	Win	11–0	(Australia) Mike Cope	UD	6	2003-10-03	(Australia) Badgery's Pavilion, Homebush Bay, Sydney	
10	Win	10–0	(Indonesia) Yasir Siagian	MD	10	2003-08-15	(Indonesia) Indosiar Studio, Jakarta	
9	Win	9–0	(Australia) Stephen Ng	TKO	8 (12)	2003-07-28	(Australia) WA Italian Club, Perth	Won Australian light middleweight title
8	Win	8–0	(Australia) Chris Collard	TKO	3 (10)	2003-06-27	(Australia) Metro City, Northbridge	Retained West Australia light middleweight title
7	Win	7–0	(Australia) Ian Schaffa	KO	4 (6)	2003-06-13	(Australia) Auburn RSL Club, Auburn, Sydney	
6	Win	6–0	(Indonesia) Moechrody	TKO	7 (10)	2003-05-30	(Indonesia) Indosiar Studio, Jakarta	
5	Win	5–0	(Australia) Frank Marzano	TKO	7 (10)	2003-04-24	(Australia) Metro City, Northbridge	Won West Australia light middleweight title
4	Win	4–0	(Australia) Garry Comer	UD	6	2003-03-15	(Australia) Challenge Stadium, Perth	
3	Win	3–0	(Australia) Barry Hancock	KO	1 (4)	2003-02-21	(Australia) Metro City, Northbridge	
2	Win	2–0	(Indonesia) Henry Aritonang	TKO	3 (10)	2003-01-09	(Indonesia) Jakarta	
1	Win	1–0	(Australia) Michael Kilmurray	TKO	3 (6)	2002-11-09	(Australia) Challenge Stadium, Perth	Professional debut
