= Ole Laursen =

Danish kickboxer and mixed martial artist

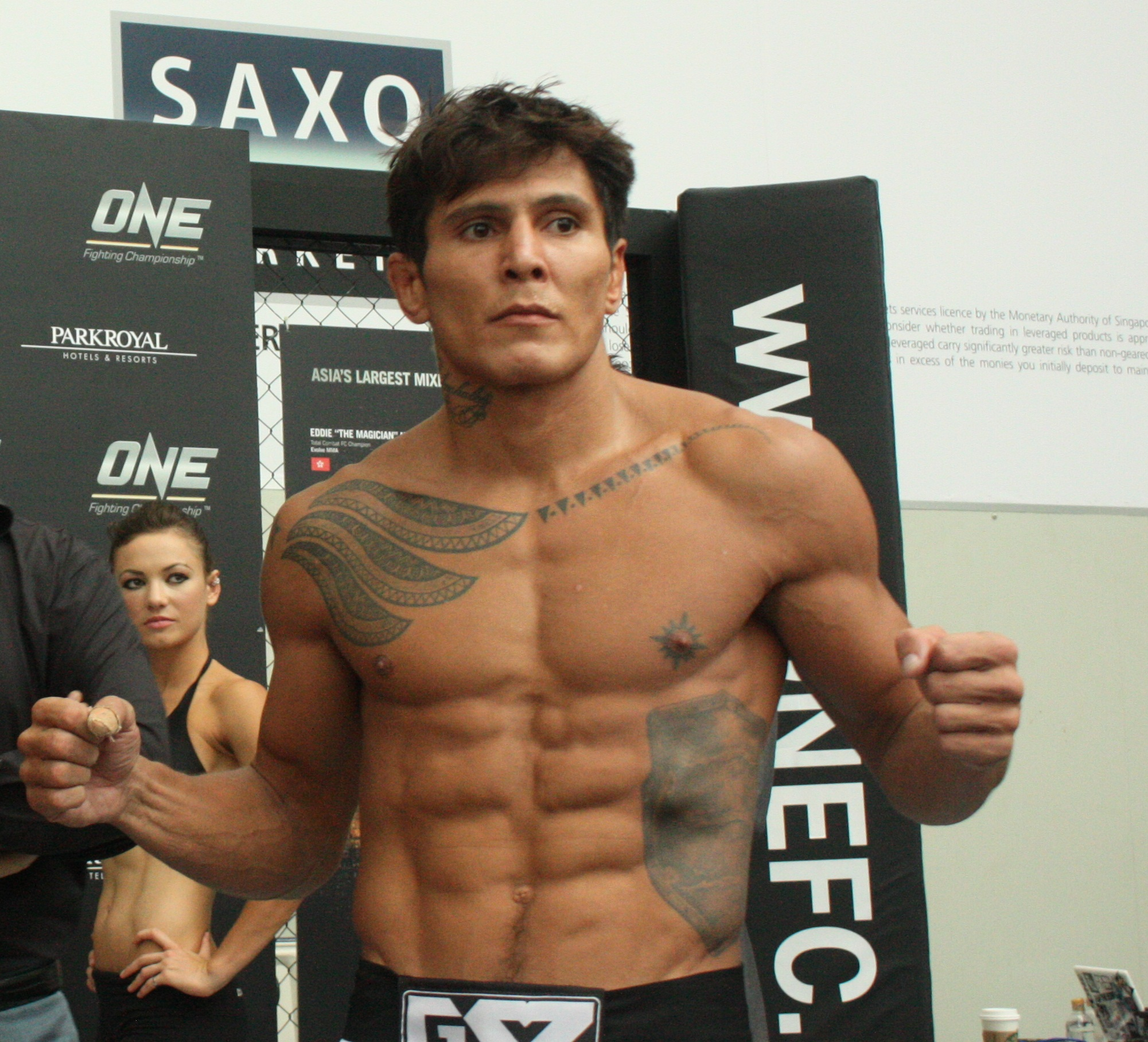
- Born: Ole Baguio Laursen; August 21, 1977 (age 49); Manila, Philippines
- Other names: Iron Fist
- Nationality: Danish
- Height: 1.77 m (5 ft 10 in)
- Weight: 72 kg (159 lb; 11.3 st)
- Division: Welterweight
- Style: Muay Thai
- Fighting out of: Ubon Ratchatani, Thailand
- Team: Legacy Gym
- Years active: 1998–present

Kickboxing record
- Total: 56
- Wins: 36
- By knockout: 12
- Losses: 20

Mixed martial arts record
- Total: 13
- Wins: 9
- By knockout: 3
- By submission: 4
- By decision: 2
- Losses: 4
- By submission: 3
- By decision: 1

Amateur record
- Total: 6
- Wins: 5
- By knockout: 5
- Losses: 1

Ole 'Iron Fist' Laursen (born August 21, 1977) is a Filipino-born Danish Welterweight Muay Thai kickboxer and mixed martial artist, he competed in K-1 and in ONE Championship.

== Early life ==
Laursen was born in Manila, Philippines to a Danish father and a Spanish-Filipino mother and moved to Denmark with his family when he was two years old. Laursen got involved with martial arts through his older brother Christian, and was 15 when he began training in Muay Thai.

Laursen currently lives in Ubon Ratchatani, Thailand and fights out of his own Legacy Gym.

Laursen trained with Peter J McCarthy, the subject, director and producer of the documentary, Fight of Flight which won "Best Foreign Documentary" at the Long Island Film Festival, New York as well as three other "Best Documentary" awards at festivals in Hamburg, Toronto and California. Laursen assisted the production team in Ubon Ratchatani.

== Kickboxing career ==
As an amateur Laursen had six fights before turning professional. He lost his first amateur bout, took a year off, and then came back with five straight wins – all by knockout, winning the 1998 Danish amateur kickboxing title in the process. He made his professional debut in 2000 and picked up his first major honour that summer, defeating Eval Denton to win the I.K.F. European title. Laursen relocated from Europe to San Diego in the United States, where he won the vacant I.M.T.C. Championship in 2001. However, he was unable to defend his title later on that year, losing a controversial decision to the Thai fighter Kongnapa in what many thought was a Laursen victory.

=== K-1 ===
In 2002 Laursen made his first appearance for the K-1 organization at the K-1 World MAX 2002 USA in Denver, Colorado, where he made the final only to lose to U.S rival Duane Ludwig. This defeat meant that Laursen was unable to participate in the inaugural K-1 MAX final but he made up somewhat for that defeat by winning the prestigious King's Cup in Bangkok, Thailand at the end of the year. In 2003 Laursen signed up with the newly formed European promotion SuperLeague where he faced Shane Chapman on his debut only to lose by decision. Despite this defeat Laursen had some initial success in SuperLeague with his Muay Thai style favouring five-round matches, going 4 and 2 with the organization by the end of 2004 and beating world champions such as Peter Crooke and Kamal El Amrani.

Over the following years Laursen spent much of his fighting time flicking back and forth between SuperLeague and K-1, although the increased competition (and shorter fight times introduced by SuperLeague) meant that he had little success with either promotion – finishing with an overall record of 4-5 SuperLeague, and 2-6 in K-1.

He returned to kickboxing to face pound-for-pound great Giorgio Petrosyan in Trieste, Italy on March 2, 2013. Severely overmatched, he was dropped with a knee to the liver before being knocked out with a left high kick immediately after in round one.

== Boxing career ==
Laursen had a trial with the Philippines National Boxing Team and was accepted but decided to move to Thailand instead of staying in the Philippines to pursue a career in boxing.

== Mixed martial arts career ==
=== Hero's ===
Laursen made his professional MMA debut in 2006 and had two fights with the K-1 Hero's promotion in Japan. He lost his first fight against Genki Sudo by decision and his second fight to Caol Uno by third round submission. Laursen was suffering from a knee injury and was not able to train properly for the fight with Uno.

Laursen did not begin to fight MMA regularly again until 2010 because he was focused on his K-1 and Muay Thai career, a decision he has subsequently said he regrets. His next two fights were both in China, with Laursen submitting Liu Guang Yao in 2007 and knocking out Shawn David in 2009.

=== Martial Combat ===
In 2010 he signed with ESPN Star Sports promotion Martial Combat in Singapore. He defeated Eduardo Pachu in the third round of their five-round 'super fight' at Martial Combat 1. His second fight was against Nick LeConte at Martial Combat 8 and Laursen won by majority decision in a controversial decision. His final fight for Martial Combat was against Malaysian Muay Thai champion Jian Kai Chee at Martial Combat 12 and Laursen won by TKO in the first round.

In November 2010 MMA website Bloody Elbow ranked Laursen number eight on a list of the top lightweight prospects in the world.

=== ONE Fighting Championship ===
On July 15, 2011 it was announced that Laursen had signed with One Fighting Championship. On July 18 it was announced that Laursen would be facing fellow Filipino Eduard Folayang at ONE Fighting Championship: Champion vs. Champion at the Singapore Indoor Stadium on September 3. On August 17, 2011 it was announced that Laursen had injured his knee in training and would be unable to fight Folayang at ONE Fighting Championship: Champion vs. Champion. He was replaced by South Korean fighter A Sol Kwon.

On February 4, 2012 it was announced that Laursen would be facing Felipe Enomoto at ONE Fighting Championship: Battle of Heroes in Jakarta, Indonesia on February 11, 2012. He lost the fight via submission in the second round.

== Championships and Accomplishments ==
=== Kickboxing ===
- King's Cup
  - 2002 King's Cup Muay Thai Champion -70 kg
- K-1
  - 2002 K-1 World MAX USA runner up -70 kg
- International Muay Thai Council
  - 2001 I.M.T.C. Muay Thai Super Welterweight World Champion -70 kg
- International Kickboxing Federation
  - 2000 I.K.F. Pro Muay Thai European Champion -70 kg
- Danish Kickboxing Association
  - 1998 Danish Amateur Kickboxing Champion

=== Mixed martial arts ===
- Martial Combat
  - 2010 Martial Combat Superfight Lightweight Champion -73 kg
- ONE Fighting Championship
  - Fight of the Night (1 Time)

== Fight record(incomplete) ==
Professional Lethwei record
36 wins (12 (T)KOs), 20 losses
Date	Result	Opponent	Event	Location	Method	Round	Time
2013-03-02	Loss	(Italy) Giorgio Petrosyan	Gotti Promotions	Trieste, Italy	KO (left high kick)	1	2:10
2013-01-25	Win	(Thailand) Local thai fighter	Fight Night	Ubon Ratchatani, Thailand	KO (Legkick)	1	
2013-01-11	Win	(Thailand) Local thai fighter	Fight Night	Ubon Ratchatani, Thailand	KO (Bodyshoot)	2	
2008-06-14	Loss	(Czech Republic) Jiri Zak	Eight Brawl, Quarter Finals	Copenhagen, Denmark	Ref stopped fight (Leg Injury)	3	
2008-05-31	Loss	(South Africa) Virgil Kalakoda	K-1 Scandinavia MAX 2008, Super Fight	Stockholm, Sweden	Ext.R Decision (Unanimous)	4	3:00
2007-06-28	Loss	(Netherlands) Andy Souwer	K-1 World MAX 2007 Final Elimination	Tokyo, Japan	TKO (Foot injury)	1	2:07
Fails to qualify for K-1 World MAX 2007 Final.
2007-04-04	Loss	(Japan) Masato	K-1 World MAX 2007 World Elite Showcase	Yokohama, Japan	Decision (Unanimous)	3	3:00
2006-09-24	Loss	(Thailand) Buakaw Por. Pramuk	K-1 MAX North European Qualification, Super Fight	Stockholm, Sweden	TKO (Ref Stop/Left Hook)	2	2:49
2006-05-20	Win	(France) Jean-Charles Skarbowsky	K-1 Scandinavia Grand Prix 2006	Stockholm, Sweden	Ext.R Decision (Unanimous)	4	3:00
2006-04-05	Loss	(Armenia) Gago Drago	K-1 World MAX 2006 World Tournament Open	Tokyo, Japan	Decision (Unanimous)	3	3:00
Fails to qualify for K-1 World MAX 2006 Final.
2006-01-14	Loss	(France) Farid Villaume	The Night of the Superfights III	Villebon-sur-Yvette, France	KO	2	
2005-10-22	Loss	(Austria) Foad Sadeghi	SuperLeague Heavy Knockout 2005	Vienna, Austria	Decision	3	3:00
2005-09-24	Loss	(Turkey) Ali Gunyar	SuperLeague Turkey 2005, Quarter Finals	Tokyo, Japan	Decision	3	3:00
2005-04-09	Loss	(Portugal) José Reis	SuperLeague Austria 2005	Vienna, Austria	Decision	5	3:00
2005-01-23	Loss	(Japan) Hiroki Shishido	Shoot Boxing Ground Zero	Fukuoka, Japan	KO (Right High Kick)	3	0:22
2004-10-22	Win	(Germany) Kamal El Amrani	SuperLeague Germany 2004	Oberhausen, Germany	KO (Knees)	5	
2004-09-19	Loss	(Netherlands) Andy Souwer	S-Cup 2004, Quarter Finals	Yokohama, Japan	TKO (Ref Stop)	1	2:37
2004-05-22	Win	(Assyrian homeland) Fadi Merza	SuperLeague Switzerland 2004	Winterthur, Switzerland	Decision	5	3:00
2004-03-30	Loss	(Belgium) Gregory Swerts	SuperLeague Italy 2004	Padua, Italy	Decision	5	3:00
2004-03-04	Loss	(Thailand) Nuengtrakarn Por.Muang Ubon	S1 World Championships 2004, Quarter Finals	Bangkok, Thailand	Decision	3	3:00
2003-12-06	Win	(Assyrian homeland) Fadi Merza	SuperLeague Netherlands 2003	Rotterdam, Netherlands	Decision	5	3:00
2003-09-27	Win	(England) Peter Crooke	SuperLeague Germany 2003	Wuppertal, Germany	TKO	2	
2003-05-10	Loss	(New Zealand) Shane Chapman	SuperLeague Austria 2003	Vienna, Austria	Decision	5	3:00
2003-03-15	Loss	(Thailand) Jomhod Kiatadisak	K-1 World GP 2003 Scandinavia	Stockholm, Sweden	Decision	3	3:00
2003-02-15	Win	(Suriname) Imro Main	VF3 - Rumble in the West	Aarhus, Denmark	Decision	5	3:00
2002-12-05	Win	(Sudan) Faisal Zakaria	King's Birthday 2002, Final	Bangkok, Thailand	KO	2	
Wins King's Cup 2002 tournament -70 kg.
2002-12-05	Win	(Romania) Florin Vintilă	King's Birthday 2002, Semi Finals	Bangkok, Thailand	KO	1	
2002-03-15	Loss	(United States) Duane Ludwig	K-1 World MAX 2002 USA, Final	Denver, Colorado, USA	Ext.R Decision (Unanimous)	4	3:00
Fight was for K-1 World MAX 2002 USA tournament -70 kg. Fails to qualify for K-1 World MAX 2002 Final.
2002-03-15	Win	(Canada) Jason Jillian	K-1 World MAX 2002 USA, Semi Finals	Denver, Colorado, USA	KO (Punch)	1	0:43
2001-10-12	Win	(Thailand) BM Sasiprappa	Warriors Cup 4	Culver City, California, USA	KO		
2001-06-03	Loss	(Thailand) Kongnapa Watcharawit	Warriors Cup 3	Burbank, California, USA	Decision (Split)	5	3:00
Loses I.M.T.C. Muay Thai Super Welterweight World title -70 kg.
2001-02-25	Win	(Thailand) Khunpon Dechkampu	Warriors Cup 2	Burbank, California, USA	Decision (Unanimous)	5	3:00
Wins vacant I.M.T.C. Muay Thai Super Welterweight World title -70 kg.
2000-06-29	Win	(England) Eval Denton	I.K.F. Night of Champions	St Helens, England, UK	Decision (Unanimous)	5	3:00
Wins Denton's I.K.F. Pro Muay Thai Middleweight European title -75 kg.
2000-04-15	Loss	(Finland) Petri Martinez		Copenhagen, Denmark	TKO	3	
Legend: Win Loss Draw/No contest Notes

== Mixed martial arts record ==
Professional record breakdown
12 matches	8 wins	4 losses
By knockout	3	0
By submission	3	3
By decision	2	1

Res.	Record	Opponent	Method	Event	Date	Round	Time	Location	Notes
Win	8–4	Cheik Kone	KO (punch)	KFWC World Cup	January 24, 2017	1	N/A	Ningxiang, China	
Win	7–4	Ansagan Kuseinov	Submission (Kimura)	Art of War 16	January 16, 2016	1	N/A	Beijing, China	
Loss	6–4	Joe Ray	Submission (guillotine choke)	Dare Fight Sports: Rebels of MMA	October 12, 2013	3	N/A	Bangkok, Thailand	
Win	6–3	Eduard Folayang	Decision (split)	ONE FC: War of the Lions	March 31, 2012	3	5:00	Kallang, Singapore	Earned Fight of the Night bonus.
Loss	5–3	Felipe Enomoto	Submission (rear-naked choke)	ONE FC: Battle of Heroes	February 11, 2012	2	3:49	Jakarta, Indonesia	
Win	5–2	Jian Kai Chee	TKO (punches)	Martial Combat 12	October 16, 2010	1	2:18	Sentosa, Singapore	
Win	4–2	Nick LeConte	Decision (majority)	Martial Combat 8	August 19, 2010	3	5:00	Sentosa, Singapore	
Win	3–2	Eduardo Pachu	Submission (rear-naked choke)	Martial Combat 1	May 12, 2010	3	0:50	Sentosa, Singapore	Won Martial Combat Lightweight Championship
Win	2–2	Shawn David	KO (punch)	AOW 12: Invincible	May 23, 2009	1	3:39	Beijing, China	
Win	1–2	Liu Guang Yao	Submission (rear-naked choke)	AOW 9: Fists of Fury	November 25, 2007	1	5:27	Beijing, China	
Loss	0–2	Caol Uno	Submission (rear-naked choke)	Hero's 5	May 3, 2006	2	4:36	Tokyo, Japan	Hero's 2006 Lightweight Grand Prix opening round.
Loss	0–1	Genki Sudo	Decision (unanimous)	Hero's 4	March 15, 2006	3	5:00	Tokyo, Japan	

== See also ==
- List of male kickboxers
