= Taishin Kohiruimaki =

Japanese martial artist (born 1977)

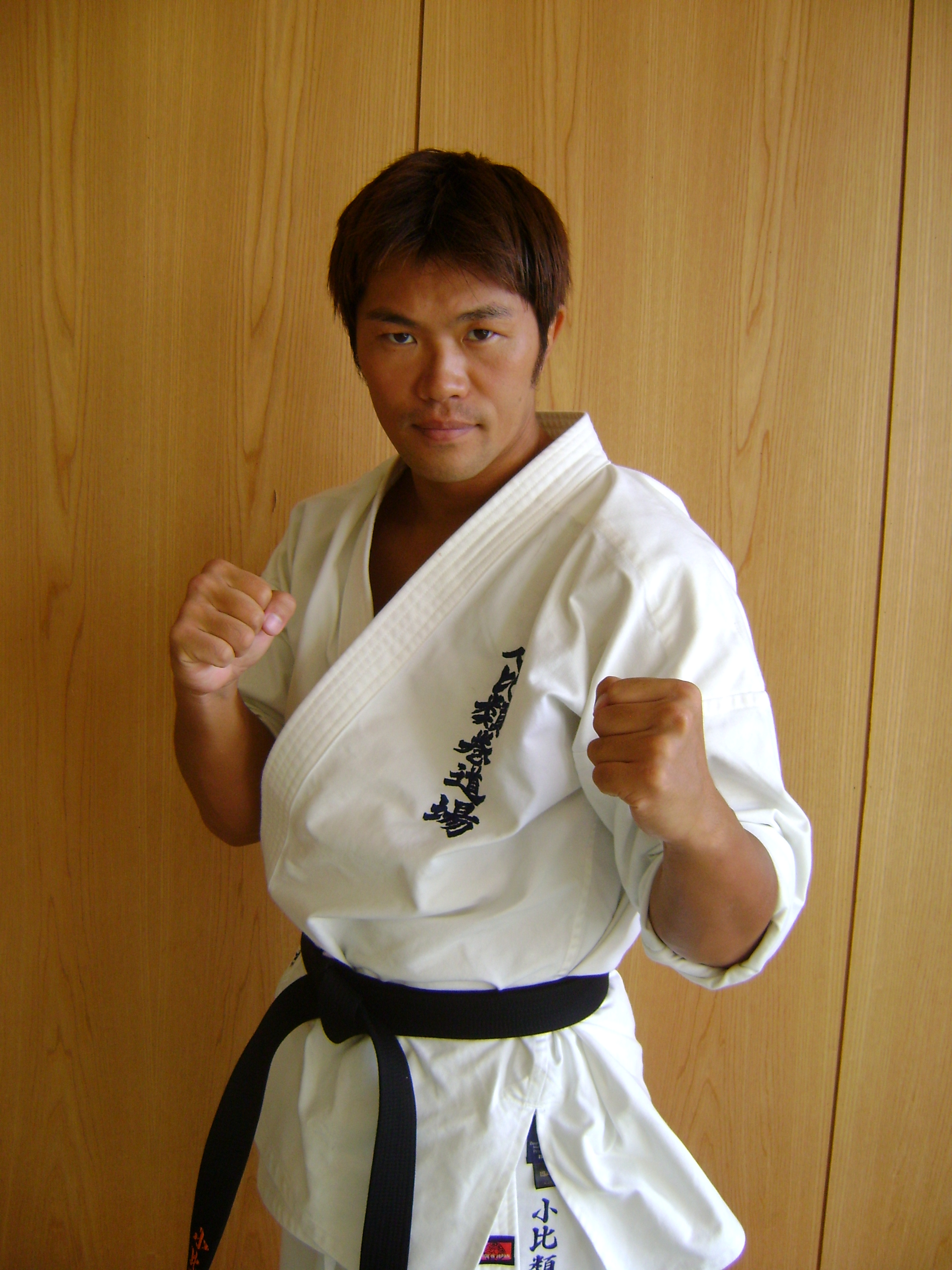
- Born: Takayuki Kohiruimaki 小比類巻 貴之; November 7, 1977 (age 48); Misawa, Aomori, Japan
- Native name: 小比類巻 太信
- Other names: Kohi
- Nationality: (Japan) Japanese
- Height: 1.80 m (5 ft 11 in)
- Weight: 70 kg (154 lb; 11 st 0 lb)
- Division: Welterweight
- Style: Kyokushin Karate, Kickboxing
- Stance: Orthodox
- Team: Bravi Ragazzi
- Trainer: Kensaku Maeda
- Rank: Black belt in Kyokushin Karate
- Years active: 1997–present

Kickboxing record
- Total: 62
- Wins: 40
- By knockout: 25
- Losses: 20
- By knockout: 7
- Draws: 2

Other information
- Website: kohi.jp
- Last updated on: March 4, 2010

Taishin Kohiruimaki (小比類巻 太信, Kohiruimaki Taishin; born November 7, 1977) is a Japanese welterweight kickboxer and karateka competing in K-1 MAX. His real name is Takayuki Kohiruimaki. He started calling himself Taishin Kohiruimaki in 2008.

== Biography ==
=== Young age ===
Taishin Kohiruimaki was born as Takayuki Kohiruimaki in Misawa, Aomori, November 7, 1977. He started learning karate at the branch of Kyokushin kaikan, and then he started kickboxing at Active J, a kickboxing gym in Tokyo.

=== Early career ===
On January 31, 1997, he debuted as a professional kickboxer of All Japan Kickboxing Federation(AJKF), and he won his first bout by KO at 3R. On May 30, 1997, he fought and won against Masato (a future K-1 tournament champion.) Kohiruimaki won by TKO at 3R with knee strikes. On October 26, he fought against Tatsuya Suzuki who was the current champion of AJKF at welterweight, and he won by TKO at 2R. After this bout, he left AJKF because his gym, Active J, decided to leave AJKF and established J-Network, a new kickboxing organization.

=== K-1 ===
On October 3, 1999, Kohiruimaki was recruited by K-1, and fought against Kotetsu Boku at the special match of K-1 World GP '99 Opening. The bout was ended as a draw after five rounds.

On August 28, 2008, he announced that he had changed his fighting name. He named himself "Taishin Kohiruimaki".

== Titles ==
- 2009 K-1 World MAX Japan tournament champion
- 2005 K-1 World MAX Japan tournament champion
- 2004 K-1 World MAX Japan tournament champion
- 2000 ISKA World Oriental Super welterweight champion

== Kickboxing record ==
Kickboxing Record
40 Wins (25 (T) KO's, 15 decisions), 20 Losses, 2 Draws
Date	Result	Opponent	Event	Location	Method	Round	Time	Record
2009-10-26	Loss	(Armenia) Gago Drago	K-1 World MAX 2009 Championship Tournament Final Super Fight	Yokohama, Japan	Decision (unanimous)	3	3:00	40-20-2
2009-02-23	Win	(Japan) Yuya Yamamoto	K-1 World MAX 2009 Japan Tournament Final	Tokyo, Japan	Decision (unanimous)	3	3:00	40-19-2
Wins K-1 World MAX 2009 Japan Tournament.
2009-02-23	Win	(Japan) Yasuhiro Kido	K-1 World MAX 2009 Japan Tournament semi-finals	Tokyo, Japan	TKO (referee stoppage)	2	0:58	39-19-2
2009-02-23	Win	(Nigeria) Andy Ologun	K-1 World MAX 2009 Japan Tournament quarter-finals	Tokyo, Japan	Decision (majority)	3	3:00	38-19-2
2008-12-05	Win	(Japan) Ash-Ra	A.J.K.F. Huziwara Fujiwara Festival '08	Japan	Decision (unanimous)	3	3:00	37-19-2
2008-10-01	Loss	(Netherlands) Joerie Mes	K-1 World MAX 2008 Championship Final Super Fight	Tokyo, Japan	KO (left hook)	3	2:59	36-19-2
2007-10-03	Loss	(South Africa) Virgil Kalakoda	K-1 World MAX 2007 Championship Super Fight	Tokyo, Japan	TKO (referee stoppage)	3	1:56	36-18-2
2007-06-28	Win	(Mongolia) Tsogto Amara	K-1 World MAX 2007 Tournament Final Elimination Super Fight	Tokyo, Japan	Decision (unanimous)	3	3:00	36-17-2
2007-02-05	Loss	(Nigeria) Andy Ologun	K-1 World MAX 2007 Japan Tournament quarter-finals	Tokyo, Japan	Ext.R decision (unanimous)	4	3:00	35-17-2
2006-09-04	Loss	(Netherlands) Andy Souwer	K-1 World MAX 2006 Champions Challenge	Tokyo, Japan	Decision (unanimous)	3	3:00	34-15-2
2006-06-30	Loss	(Japan) Masato	K-1 World MAX 2006 Championship quarter-finals	Yokohama, Japan	Decision (unanimous)	3	3:00	35-15-2
2006-04-05	Win	(South Korea) Chi Bin Lim	K-1 World MAX 2006 World Tournament Open	Tokyo, Japan	TKO (3 Knockdowns/Low Kick)	3	2:46	35-14-2
Qualifies for K-1 World MAX 2006 Championship.
2005-07-20	Loss	(Netherlands) Andy Souwer	K-1 World MAX 2005 Championship quarter-finals	Yokohama, Japan	Decision (majority)	3	3:00	34-14-2
2005-05-04	Win	(Lithuania) Darius Skliaudys	K-1 World MAX 2005 World Tournament Open	Tokyo, Japan	TKO (corner stoppage)	2	1:29	34-13-2
Qualifies for K-1 World MAX 2005 Championship.
2005-02-23	Win	(Japan) Akeomi Nitta	K-1 World MAX 2005 Japan Tournament Final	Tokyo, Japan	KO (right Front Kick)	1	0:36	33-13-2
Wins K-1 World MAX 2005 Japan Tournament title.
2005-02-23	Win	(Japan) Kojiro	K-1 World MAX 2005 Japan Tournament semi-finals	Tokyo, Japan	TKO (2 Knockdowns/Right Hook)	2	1:13	32-13-2
2005-02-23	Win	(Japan) Kazuya Yasuhiro	K-1 World MAX 2005 Japan Tournament quarter-finals	Tokyo, Japan	Ext.R decision (split)	4	3:00	31-13-2
2004-10-13	Win	(Netherlands) Albert Kraus	K-1 World MAX 2004 Champions' Challenge	Tokyo, Japan	Decision (unanimous)	3	3:00	30-13-2
2004-07-07	Loss	(Thailand) Buakaw Por. Pramuk	K-1 World MAX 2004 World Tournament semi-finals	Tokyo, Japan	KO (Knee Strike)	2	0:42	29-13-2
2004-07-07	Win	(Greece) Mike Zambidis	K-1 World MAX 2004 World Tournament quarter-finals	Tokyo, Japan	Decision (unanimous)	3	3:00	29-12-2
2004-04-07	Win	(Portugal) Paolo Balicha	K-1 World MAX 2004 World Tournament Open	Tokyo, Japan	Decision (unanimous)	3	3:00	28-12-2
Qualifies for K-1 World MAX 2004 World Tournament.
2004-02-24	Win	(Turkey) Serkan Yilmaz	K-1 World MAX 2004 Japan Tournament Final	Tokyo, Japan	Decision (unanimous)	3	3:00	27-12-2
Wins K-1 World MAX 2004 Japan Tournament title.
2004-02-24	Win	(Japan) Kozo Takeda	K-1 World MAX 2004 Japan Tournament semi-finals	Tokyo, Japan	KO (flying knee)	2	1:05	26-12-2
2004-02-24	Win	(Japan) Hayato	K-1 World MAX 2004 Japan Tournament quarter-finals	Tokyo, Japan	Decision (unanimous)	3	3:00	25-12-2
2003-11-18	Win	(United States) Tony Valente	K-1 World MAX 2003 Champions' Challenge	Tokyo, Japan	KO (Body kick)	3	0:59	24-12-2
2003-08-30	Loss	(Thailand) Funfa Luktabfah	Future Fighter IKUSA 4 - FIREWORKS	Japan	2nd Ext.R decision (majority)	5	3:00	23-12-2
2003-06-08	Win	(Tunisia) Karimi Shonan	Future Fighter IKUSA 3 - Suicide Broken Arrow	Japan	Decision (unanimous)	3	3:00	23-11-2
2003-03-01	Loss	(Japan) Yasuhiro Kazuya	K-1 World MAX 2003 Japan Grand Prix quarter-finals	Tokyo, Japan	Decision (unanimous)	3	3:00	22-11-2
2002-10-11	Loss	(England) Peter Crooke	K-1 World MAX 2002 Champions' Challenge	Tokyo, Japan	KO (left hook)	5	1:06	22-10-2
2002-05-11	Loss	(Thailand) Kaolan Kaovichit	K-1 World MAX 2002 World Tournament Final semi-finals	Tokyo, Japan	KO (knee strikes)	2	2:42	22-9-2
2002-05-11	Win	(Switzerland) Marino Deflorin	K-1 World MAX 2002 World Tournament Final quarter-finals	Tokyo, Japan	KO (left knee)	1	1:12	22-8-2
2002-02-11	Loss	(Japan) Masato	K-1 Japan MAX 2002 Final	Tokyo, Japan	Decision (unanimous)	3	3:00	21-8-2
Fight was for K-1 Japan MAX 2002 title.
2002-02-11	Win	(Japan) Takashi Ono	K-1 Japan MAX 2002 semi-finals	Tokyo, Japan	Decision (unanimous)	3	3:00	21-7-2
2002-02-11	Win	(Japan) Genki Sudo	K-1 Japan MAX 2002 quarter-finals	Tokyo, Japan	TKO (referee stoppage)	3	1:27	20-7-2
2001-11-11	Win	(Australia) Ben Smullen	K-1 Oceania MAX 2001	Melbourne, Australia	KO (right low kick)	4		19-7-2
2001-04-29	Win	(France) Samir Berbachi	K-1 World Grand Prix 2001 in Osaka	Osaka, Japan	KO (left knee)	3	0:24	18-7-2
2001-03-30	Win	(Russia) Maxim Grechkin	M.A.J.K.F. "ODYSSEY-1 Ito Takashi Retirement Memorial Match"	Tokyo, Japan	Decision (unanimous)	5	3:00	17-7-2
2001-01-12	Loss	(Australia) Daniel Dawson	Wolf Revolution: 2nd Wave	Japan	Decision (majority)	5	3:00	16-7-2
2000-12-10	Win	(France) Wilreid Montargne	K-1 World Grand Prix 2000 Final	Tokyo, Japan	KO (kick)	5	1:46	16-6-2
2000-11-01	Win	(England) Neil Woods	K-1 J-MAX 2000	Tokyo, Japan	KO (right high kick)	3	0:47	15-6-2
Wins vacant title of I.S.K.A. Oriental World Super Welterweight title.
2000-07-20	Win	(Australia) Luke Kenton	M.A.J.K.F. "Combat 2000"	Japan	Decision (unanimous)	5	3:00	14-6-2
2000-06-03	Loss	(Switzerland) Marino Deflorin	K-1 Fight Night 2000	Zurich, Switzerland	Decision (unanimous)	5	3:00	13-6-2
Fight was for Deflorin's title of W.K.A. Muay Thai World Middleweight title.
2000-04-29	Draw	(Japan) Ryuji Goto	M.A.J.K.F.	Japan	Decision Draw	5	3:00	13-5-2
2000-01-25	Win	(Netherlands) Ramon Dekkers	K-1 Rising 2000	Nagasaki, Japan	TKO (doctor stoppage)	1	3:00	13-5-1
1999-12-24	Win	(Australia) Shannon Forrester	M.A.J.K.F. "Tornado Warning Tornado Invasion"	Japan	TKO (doctor stoppage)	2	2:26	12-5-1
1999-10-03	Draw	(Japan) Hideki Boku	K-1 World Grand Prix '99 opening round	Osaka, Japan	Decision Draw	5	3:00	11-5-1
1999-06-01	Loss	(South Korea) Kim Hoon	A.J.K.F. "WAVE-II"	Japan	Decision (split)	5	3:00	11-5
1999-03-17	Loss	(Thailand) Chanapek Gatyindee	A.J.K.F. "WAVE-II"	Japan	KO	3	2:24	11-4
1999-02-05	Win	(Thailand) JMTC Pittinoi	J-Network "Kick the Kick" '99 Stage 1	Tokyo, Japan	TKO (corner stoppage)	3	2:01	11-3
1999-01-16	Loss	(Thailand) Mangondam Por Pongsahan	Omnoi Stadium	Bangkok, Thailand	Decision (unanimous)	5	3:00	10-3
1998-12-22	Win	(Japan) Tomohiro Chiba	J-Network "Kick the Kick" '98 Final	Tokyo, Japan	KO (Knee Strike)	2	2:56	10-2
1998-11-14	Win	(Japan) Hiroyuki Doi	GROUND ZERO TOKYO ~ Shoot Boxing	Tokyo, Japan	TKO (doctor stoppage)	5	3:00	9-2
1998-09-26	Win	(France) Karim Souda	J-Network "Kick the Kick" '98 Stage 4	Tokyo, Japan	Decision (unanimous)	5	3:00	8-2
1998-04-25	Loss	(Australia) John Wayne Parr	J-Network	Tokyo, Japan	Decision (unanimous)	5	3:00	7-2
1998-02-28	Win	(Canada) Mark Brackenbury	J-Network "Kick the Kick" '98 Stage 1	Tokyo, Japan	TKO (doctor stoppage)	2	2:51	7-1
1998-01-24	Win	(Thailand) Swat Nuhi	Omnoi Stadium	Bangkok, Thailand	KO (Knees)	4		6-1
1997-12-21	Loss	(Japan) Akeomi Nitta	J-Network "J-Prestage"	Tokyo, Japan	KO (Low Kicks)	4	2:13	5-1
1997-10-26	Win	(Japan) Tatsuya Suzuki	A.J.K.F.	Tokyo, Japan	KO	2	1:55	5-0
1997-07-25	Win	(Japan) Tomohiro Chiba	A.J.K.F. "Kick Over-VIII"	Tokyo, Japan	KO (knee strikes)	3	1:47	4-0
1997-07-12	Win	(Thailand) G Kianuanjai	Omnoi Boxing Stadium	Samut Sakhon, Thailand	KO	3		3-0
1997-05-30	Win	(Japan) Masato	A.J.K.F. "Kick Over-VI"	Tokyo, Japan	TKO (referee stoppage)	3	2:52	2-0
1997-01-31	Win	(Japan) Yuzo Shinozaki	A.J.K.F. "Kick Over-I"	Tokyo, Japan	KO	3	1:54	1-0
Legend: Win Loss Draw/No contest Notes

== See also ==
- List of K-1 events
- List of male kickboxers
