= Ryōji =

- Gender: Male

Origin
- Origin: Japanese
- Meaning: Different meanings depending on the kanji used

Ryōji, Ryoji, Ryouji or Ryohji (written: 良二, 良治, 良司, 良仁, 良次, 涼至, 亮二, 亮司, 亮志, 諒時, 諒司, 了滋 or 領二) is a masculine Japanese given name. Notable people with the name include:

- Ryoji Aikawa (相川 亮二; born 1976), Japanese baseball player
- Ryōji Akiyama (秋山 亮二; born 1942), Japanese photographer
- Ryōji Arai (荒井 良二; born 1956), Japanese illustrator
- Ryōji Chūbachi (中鉢 良治; born 1947), Japanese businessman
- Ryoji Fujiki (藤木 良司; born 1951), Japanese cross-country skier
- Ryoji Fujimori (藤森 亮志; born 1997), Japanese footballer
- Ryoji Fukui (福井 諒司; born 1987), Japanese footballer
- Ryoji Fukunaga (福永 亮次; born 1986), Japanese retired professional boxer
- Ryoji Ikeda (池田 亮司; born 1966), Japanese sound artist
- Ryoji Isaoka (砂岡 良治; born 1962), Japanese retired weightlifter
- Kaihō Ryōji (海鵬 涼至; born 1973), Japanese sumo wrestler
- Ryoji Katsuki (香月 良仁; born 1984), Japanese baseball player
- Ryoji Kawamoto (川本 良二; born 1982), Japanese footballer
- Ryoji Kuribayashi (栗林 良吏; born 1996), Japanese professional baseball pitcher
- Ryōji Minagawa (皆川 亮二; born 1964), Japanese manga artist
- Ryoji Morimoto (森本 亮治; born 1982), Japanese actor
- Ryoji Moriyama (森山 良二; born 1963), Japanese professional baseball Coach and former pitcher
- Ryoji Nakagawa (中川 了滋; born 1939), Japanese judge
- Ryoji Nakata (中田 亮二; born 1987), Japanese baseball player
- Ryoji Naraoka (奈良岡 良二; 1908–1992), Japanese racewalker
- Ryōji Noyori (野依 良治; born 1938), Japanese chemist
- Ryoji Sai (崔 領二; born 1980), Japanese professional wrestler
- Tamakasuga Ryōji (玉春日 良二; born 1972), Japanese sumo wrestler
- Ryōji Uehara (上原 良司; 1922–1945), Imperial Japanese Army flight captain
- Ryoji Ujihara (氏原 良二; born 1981), Japanese footballer
- Ryoji Yamagishi (山岸 良二; born 1951), Japanese archaeologist, national director
- Ryoji Yamashita (山下 諒時; born 2000), Japanese footballer
- Ryoji Yamazaki (山崎 良次; born 1963), Japanese bobsledder

== Fictional characters ==
- Ryoji Mochizuki (望月 綾時), a character in the video game Persona 3
