= K-1 World MAX 2010 -70kg World Championship Tournament final =

K-1 kickboxing events in 2010

K-1 World MAX 2010 -70kg World Championship Tournament Final
- The poster for K-1 World MAX 2010 -70kg World Championship Tournament Final
- Promotion: K-1
- Date: November 08, 2010
- Venue: Ryōgoku Kokugikan
- City: Tokyo, Japan
- Attendance: 9,189

Event chronology
K-1 World MAX 2010 -70kg World Championship Tournament Final 16 in Seoul	K-1 World MAX 2010 -70kg World Championship Tournament Final	KOK World GP 2010 in Warsaw

K-1 World MAX 2010 –70 kg World Championship Tournament Final was a martial arts event to be held by the K-1 on Monday, November 8, 2010 at the Ryōgoku Kokugikan in Tokyo, Japan. It will be the 9th inaugural K-1 World Max Final, the culmination of a year full of regional elimination tournaments. All fights will follow K-1's classic tournament format and be conducted under K-1 Rules, three rounds of three minutes each, with a possible tiebreaker.

The qualification for the top eight fighters was held at the K-1 World MAX 2010 Final 16 Part 1 on July 5, 2010 in Tokyo, Japan and the K-1 World MAX 2010 Final 16 Part 2 on October 3, 2010 in Seoul, Korea.

== Final 8 Participating Fighters ==
=== Qualifiers - Finalists ===
- (Netherlands) Albert Kraus
- (Japan) Yoshihiro Sato
- Yuichiro "Jienotsu" Nagashima (K-1 World MAX 2010 –70 kg Japan Tournament Champion)
- (Italy) Giorgio Petrosyan (Reigning K-1 World MAX 2009 Champion)
- (Morocco) Mohammed Khamal (K-1 World MAX 2010 West Europe Champion)
- (Greece) Mike Zambidis
- (Poland) Michał Głogowski
- (Armenia) Gago Drago

== K-1 World Max 2010 Final bracket ==
Final 16 - Part 1 Final 16 - Part 2
(Greece) Mike Zambidis	DEC
(Morocco) Chahid Oulad El Hadj	4r.
(Brazil) Andre Dida	3r.
(Japan) Yuichiro Nagashima	DEC
(Netherlands) Albert Kraus	DEC
(Japan) Hiroki Nakajima	3r.
(Italy) Giorgio Petrosyan	DEC
(Belarus) Vitaly Gurkov	3r.
(Armenia) Gago Drago	KO
(South Korea) Su Hwan Lee	2r.
(Ukraine) Artur Kyshenko	3r.
(Morocco) Mohammed Khamal	DEC
(Thailand) Sagatpetch IngramGym	4r.
(Poland) Michał Głogowski	DEC
(Japan) Yoshihiro Sato	DEC
(Japan) Yuya Yamamoto	3r.

Quarter Finals
(Greece) Mike Zambidis	KO
(Japan) Yuichiro Nagashima	3r.
(Netherlands) Albert Kraus	3r.
(Italy) Giorgio Petrosyan	DEC
(Armenia) Gago Drago	DEC
(Morocco) Mohammed Khamal	3r.
(Poland) Michał Głogowski	3r.
(Japan) Yoshihiro Sato	DEC

Semi Finals
(Greece) Mike Zambidis	3r.
(Italy) Giorgio Petrosyan	DEC
(Armenia) Gago Drago	3r.
(Japan) Yoshihiro Sato	DEC

Final
(Italy) Giorgio Petrosyan	DEC
(Japan) Yoshihiro Sato	3r.

== FightCard ==
K-1 World MAX 2010 Final 8 Fight Card
Opening Fight(1): K-1 Rules / 3Min. 3R Ext. 1R (85 kg)
(Brazil) Fabiano Da Silva vs. Jan Kaszuba (Canada)
Da Silva defeated Kaszuba by three round unanimous decision 3-0.
Opening Fight(2): K-1 Rules / 3Min. 3R Ext. 1R (63 kg)
(Japan) Shunsuke Oishi vs. Makoto Nishiyama (Japan)
Nishiyama defeated Oishi by KO at 0:54 of the second round.
Reserve Fight: K-1 Rules / 3Min. 3R Ext. 1R
(Japan) Hinata Watanabe vs. Andre Dida (Brazil)
Watanabe defeated Dida by three round unanimous decision 3-0.
Super Fight Free Weight: Dream MMA Rules / 1R-10Min. 2R-5Min
(Japan) Satoshi Ishii vs. Katsuyori Shibata (Japan)
Ishii defeated Shibata by submission (ArmLock) at 3:30 of the first round.
Quarter Finals: K-1 Rules / 3Min. 3R Ext. 1R
(Greece) Mike Zambidis vs. Yuichiro Nagashima (Japan)
Zambidis defeated Nagashima by KO at 0:53 of the third round.
(Netherlands) Albert Kraus vs. Giorgio Petrosyan (Italy)
Petrosyan defeated Kraus by three round unanimous decision 3-0.
(Armenia) Gago Drago vs. Mohammed Khamal (Morocco)
Drago defeated Khamal by three round unanimous decision 3-0.
(Poland) Michał Głogowski vs. Yoshihiro Sato (Japan)
Sato defeated Głogowski by three round unanimous decision 3-0.
Super Fight: K-1 Rules / 3Min. 3R Ext. 1R (63 kg)
(Japan) Yuta Kubo vs. Hiroya (Japan)
Kubo defeated Hiroya by three round unanimous decision 3-0.
Semi Finals: K-1 Rules / 3Min. 3R Ext. 1R
(Greece) Mike Zambidis vs. Giorgio Petrosyan (Italy)
Petrosyan defeated Zambidis by three round unanimous decision 3-0.
(Armenia) Gago Drago vs. Yoshihiro Sato (Japan)
Sato defeated Drago by three round unanimous decision 3-0.
Super Fight: K-1 Rules / 3Min. 3R Ext. 1R (70 kg)
(Japan) Yuya Yamamoto vs. Seichi Ikemoto (Japan)
Yamamoto defeated Ikemoto by KO at 2:22 of the second round.
Final: K-1 Rules / 3Min. 3R Ext. 1R
(Italy) Giorgio Petrosyan vs. Yoshihiro Sato (Japan)
Petrosyan defeated Sato by three round unanimous decision 3-0.

== See also ==
- List of K-1 events
- List of K-1 champions
- List of male kickboxers
