= Xu Yan (kickboxer) =

Chinese Sanda kickboxer

- Born: November 22, 1987 (age 38); Binzhou, China
- Native name: 徐琰
- Other names: The Chinese Tiger; Phoenix
- Height: 1.84 m (6 ft 1/2 in)
- Weight: 70 kg (150 lb; 11 st)
- Division: Welterweight; Middleweight
- Style: Sanda, Kickboxing
- Stance: Orthodox
- Fighting out of: Beijing, China
- Team: Beijing Shenghua International Fighting Club
- Years active: 2003-present

Kickboxing record
- Total: 69
- Wins: 47
- By knockout: 25
- Losses: 21
- By knockout: 8
- Draws: 1
- Last updated on: December 31, 2017

Xu Yan (Chinese: 徐琰; pinyin: Xǔ Yán; born November 22, 1987) is a Chinese Sanda, kickboxer who competes in the middleweight division. A multiple time provincial and national Sanshou titlist in his home country, Xu later made the switch to Oriental rules kickboxing and gained recognition fighting internationally in promotions such as Fight Code, K-1 and Shootboxing.

== Career ==
=== Early career ===
Xu Yan began sanshou training at an early age and rose to prominence by winning provincial titles in his native Shandong three years consecutively; he won the Shandong Province Sanshou Championships at -65 kg/143 lb in 2003 and 2004 and at -70 kg/154 lb in 2005. Staying at -70 kg/154 lb, he then won the Chinese National Sanshou club Championships in 2005 and 2006, and affirmed himself as the country's top middleweight by winning a tournament held by Heroes of Legends in January 2007. Fighting for the first time internationally, Xu was part of a team of sanshou fighters that challenged shoot boxing at Shoot Boxing 2007 Mu-So 2nd in Tokyo, Japan, on May 25, 2007. He lost to Kenichi Ogata via a knee to the body knockout in the third round, the first loss of his professional career. In September 2007, he won the IFB International Sanda Tournament in Guangzhou, China, defeating Muay Thai stylist Akarn Sannaha by decision in the final. A month later on October 13, 2007, Xu beat Joey Pagliuso by unanimous decision in Shenzhen, China, using his height and reach advantage to outpoint the American.

Xu won a second Legend of Heroes tournament in December 2008 before losing a unanimous decision to Vuyisile Colossa in the same promotion in Beijing, China on January 18, 2009. Making the foray into Oriental rules kickboxing, he debuted in K-1 on March 20, 2009, at K-1 Award & MAX Korea 2009 in Seoul, South Korea where he lost to Kim Se-Ki by technical knockout after being dropped twice in the second round. On May 31, 2009, he competed in the four man middleweight tournament at The Challenger event held at The Venetian Macao in Macau. After beating Keiji Ozaki by unanimous decision in the semi-finals, he lost to Heung Pak-Wing by first-round knockout in the final.

=== SportAccord and King's Cup tournament ===
Xu Yan then rebounded with a split decision win over Baxter Humby in Las Vegas, Nevada, United States on August 30, 2009, before returning to K-1 to fight Yuichiro Nagashima in a non-tournament bout at the K-1 World MAX 2009 World Championship Tournament Final in Tokyo on October 26, 2009. Although a heavy underdog, he scored an upset win by knocking Nagashima down with a left hook inside the opening thirty seconds of the fight before finishing him with the same technique soon after. He was then set to face Lim Chi-Bin at The Khan 2 in Seoul on November 27, 2009, but Lim was replaced by Lee Su-Hwan. He lost to Lee by TKO in round two.

After beginning the year with wins over Ben Barwise and Lewis Corris, Xu was given the toughest test of his career in the form of Buakaw Por. Pramuk in a Wu Lin Feng promoted event at Henan Provincial Stadium in Zhengzhou, China on June 19, 2010. Xu was outfought and lost on points. He also received a controversial count by the referee in round two after going down from a low blow. He fought and beat another Thai in his next outing, outpointing Malaipet Sasiprapa at Legends of Heroes: Muaythai vs. Kung Fu at the Arena of Stars in Pahang, Malaysia on October 9, 2010. In his second appearance on US soil, Xu was scheduled to fight Raul Rodriguez at Wu Lin Feng: Battle of Las Vegas II on November 13, 2010, in Las Vegas but a change occurred as Rodriguez was replaced by Shane Oblonsky. He lost via unanimous decision. Three weeks later, Xu Yan was drafted into the 2010 edition of the King's Cup Muay Thai tournament as one of three replacement fighters. Going down in Bangkok, Thailand on December 5, 2010, Xu was eliminated at the quarter-finals when he lost to Alexander Vogel on points.

=== Fight Code tournaments ===
On March 12, 2011, Xu faced Sudsakorn Sor Klinmee on the Oktagon 2011 card in Milan, Italy. Round one was close but Sudsakorn asserted his dominance early on with a throw and only got better in the second. Xu faded in round three and received a somewhat controversial standing eight count before losing the decision. He put a halt to his three-fight losing streak five months later when he knocked out Adil Abbas at a Legends of Heroes event in Nanchang, China before returning to Europe to compete for the Fight Code promotion and entered into the organization's 2011 Dragons Series -70 kg/154 lb tournament at the quarter-finals stage when he took the place of Dzhabar Askerov who withdrew due to scheduling conflicts. He lost to Abdallah Mabel via split decision on October 15, 2011, in Marseille, France but it later emerged that the French sporting commission had not allowed Fight Code's complete rule set just hours before the event and so a rematch was set for Geneva, Switzerland on November 26, 2011. Three weeks before the rematch, Xu suffered a first-round KO loss to Lamsongkram Chuwattana in Changsha, China. Against Mabel, Xu Yan rallied back in round three but the Frenchman dominated the first two and took the unanimous judges' decision.

=== K-1 tournaments ===
He stopped another three-fight skid with a win over Yuya Yamamoto at Krush.16 in Tokyo on February 17, 2012. Xu got off to a good start, landing against the defensively flawed Yamamoto and took over in the second by scoring three knockdowns and earning him the TKO victory. Xu Yan outpointed Quinton Arendse on a Legends of Heroes show in his native country on April 21, 2012 before making a return to K-1 after an almost three-year absence to compete in the K-1 World MAX 2012 World Championship Tournament. At the K-1 World MAX 2012 World Championship Tournament Final 16 in Madrid, Spain on May 27, 2012, he fought Yasuhiro Kido in the tournament's opening stage. The fight got off to a rather lackluster start and had the crowd booing at one point in the first round before Xu fell victim to Kido's patented spinning backfist late in the third.

After rebounding with a high kick knockout of a Japanese opponent in Legends of Heroes in Kunshan, China two months later, Xu Yan was soundly beaten to a unanimous decision in the tournament reserve match at the K-1 World MAX 2012 World Championship Tournament Final in Athens, Greece on December 15, 2012.

=== WMC and Hero Legends titles ===
Xu Yan scored a first-round knockout over Ton Kunchat at Combat Renaissance in Hong Kong on September 17, 2013.

He defeated Mike Zambidis by unanimous decision, dropping him in rounds one and two, at Hero Legends in Jinan, China on December 3, 2014.

=== Hero Legends title reign ===
After winning the Hero Legends title, Yan fought with the organization five more times in non-title bouts. In May 2014, he fought Yoshihiro Sato to a draw. A year later, he knocked out Kraisorn Singmamor, and a month after this fight, he scored a TKO win over Yodpichai SorSaksri. In July 2015, he fought twice in the span of two weeks, he won a unanimous decision against Munguntsooj Nandin-Erdene and defeated Ryota Kojima by first-round TKO. A month later, he stepped in on short notice to replace Yodsanklai Fairtex against Giorgio Petrosyan, with Hero Legends making the fight a title bout. Petrosyan won the fight by knockout, after dropping Yan by a knee in the third round.

== Championships and awards ==
=== Kickboxing ===
- The Challenger
  - The Challenger -70 kg/154 lb Tournament Runner-up
- Hero Legends
  - Hero Legends World -70 kg/154 lb Championship (1 Time)
  - 2012 Hero Legends -70 kg/154 lb Tournament Championship
  - 2011 Hero Legends -70 kg/154 lb Tournament Championship
  - 2010 Hero Legends -70 kg/154 lb Tournament Championship
  - 2007 Hero Legends -70 kg/154 lb Tournament Championship
- IFB International Sanda Tournament
  - IFB International Sanda Tournament Championship
- Shandong Province Sanshou Championships
  - 2003 Shandong Province Sanshou Championships -65 kg/143 lb Championship
  - 2004 Shandong Province Sanshou Championships -65 kg/143 lb Championship
  - 2005 Shandong Province Sanshou Championships -70 kg/154 lb Championship
- World Muaythai Council
  - WMC World Super Welterweight (-70 kg/154 lb) Championship

== Kickboxing record ==
Kickboxing record
47 wins (25 KOs), 21 losses, 1 draws
Date	Result	Opponent	Event	Location	Method	Round	Time
2018-04-07	Loss	(Brazil) Natta William	East of Dragon	Weifang, China	Decision (unanimous)	3	3:00
2018-01-05	Win	(Iran) Suhela	Wang zhe hui meng-MMC	Shenzhen, China	TKO	3	
2017-12-31	Win	(Japan) Hiroto	Hero Legends 2017	Shenyang, China	Decision (unanimous)	3	3:00
2017-09-09	Win	(Russia) Kushkov Asgel	The World Boxing Championship of Wang zhe hui meng	Guangzhou, China	TKO	2	
2017-04-29	Win	(Brazil) Victor H.Nunes	Hero Legends 2017	Tai'an, China	Decision (unanimous)	3	3:00
2017-01-07	Loss	(Russia) Khambakhadov Saifullah	WBK-22	Hangzhou, China	Decision (unanimous)	5	3:00
2016-10-30	Win	(Brazil) Castro	Hero Legends-Heroic soul	Shanghai, China	TKO (low kicks)	3	2:36
2016-10-02	Win	(Thailand) Duangpikard Kor Sampaothong	Hero Legends	Alxa, Inner Mongolia, China	Decision (unanimous)	3	3:00
2016-09-11	Win	(Japan) Yamashita	Hero Legends	Fuqing, Fujian, China	KO (punches)	1	1:33
2016-07-09	Win	(France) Cyber Balma	Hero Legends	Beijing, China	TKO (ref.stop/3 knockdowns)	1	2:00
2016-04-02	Loss	(Canada) Josh Jauncey	Glory of Heroes 1	Shenzhen, China	KO (high kick)	2	
2016-01-16	Win	(Japan) Asami Zaurus	Hero Legends	Hainan, China	Decision (unanimous)	3	3:00
2015-08-28	Loss	(Italy) Giorgio Petrosyan	Hero Legends	Dunhuang, China	KO (left knee to the body)	3	1:17
Losses the Hero Legends -70kg Championship.
2015-07-24	Win	(Japan) Ryota Kojima	Hero Legends	Chongqing, China	KO (punches)	1	1:00
2015-07-10	Win	(Mongolia) Munguntsooj Nandin-Erdene	Hero Legends	Chongqing, China	Decision (unanimous)	3	3:00
2015-06-05	Win	(Thailand) Yodpichai SorSaksri	Hero Legends	Shenzhen, China	TKO (punches)	2	0:40
2015-05-08	Win	(Thailand) Kraisorn Singmamor	Hero Legends	Shenzhen, China	KO (punches)	1	0:40
2014-05-17	Draw	(Japan) Yoshihiro Sato	Hero Legends	Shenzhen, China	Decision	3	3:00
2014-01-03	Win	(Greece) Mike Zambidis	Hero Legends	Jinan, China	Decision (unanimous)	3	3:00
Wins the Hero Legends World -70 kg/154 lb Championship.
2013-09-17	Win	(Thailand) Ton Kunchat	Combat Renaissance	Hong Kong	KO (high kick and punches)	1	
Wins the WMC World Super Welterweight (-70kg/154 lb) Championship.
2012-12-15	Loss	(Spain) Abraham Roqueñi	K-1 World MAX 2012 World Championship Tournament Final, Reserve Match	Athens, Greece	Decision (unanimous)	3	3:00
2012-07-08	Win	(Japan) Hareruya	Legends of Heroes	Kunshan, China	KO (high kick)	1	
2012-05-27	Loss	(Japan) Yasuhiro Kido	K-1 World MAX 2012 World Championship Tournament Final 16, First Round	Madrid, Spain	KO (spinning backfist)	3	2:46
2012-04-21	Win	(South Africa) Quinton Arendse	Legends of Heroes	China	Decision	3	3:00
2012-02-17	Win	(Japan) Yuya Yamamoto	Krush.16	Tokyo, Japan	TKO (punches)	2	1:39
2011-11-26	Loss	(France) Abdallah Mabel	Fight Code Rhinos Series 2011 Part 5, Quarter Finals	Geneva, Switzerland	Decision (unanimous)	3	3:00
2011-11-05	Loss	(Thailand) Lamsongkram Chuwattana	Legends of Heroes: Muaythai vs. King Fu	Changsha, China	TKO (knee)	1	
2011-10-15	Loss	(France) Abdallah Mabel	Fight Code Dragon Series 2011 Part 4, Quarter Finals	Marseille, France	Decision (split)	3	3:00
2011-08-13	Win	(France) Adil Abbas	Legends of Heroes	Nanchang, China	KO		
2011-03-12	Loss	(Thailand) Sudsakorn Sor Klinmee	Oktagon 2011	Milan, Italy	Decision	3	3:00
2010-12-05	Loss	(Germany) Alexander Vogel	King's Cup 2010, Quarter Finals	Bangkok, Thailand	Decision	3	3:00
2010-11-13	Loss	(United States) Shane Oblonsky	Wu Lin Feng: Battle of Las Vegas II	Las Vegas, Nevada, USA	Decision (unanimous)	3	3:00
2010-10-09	Win	(Thailand) Malaipet Sasiprapa	Legends of Heroes: Muaythai vs. Kung Fu	Pahang, Malaysia	Decision (unanimous)	3	3:00
2010-09-03	Loss	(Slovenia) Stračanek Gregor	SportAccord World Combat Games, Quarter Finals -71 kg	Beijing, China	Decision	3	3:00
2010-06-19	Loss	(Thailand) Buakaw Por. Pramuk	Wu Lin Feng	Zhengzhou, China	Decision	3	3:00
2010-05-11	Win	(Mexico) Luis Bio	WCK Muay Thai Show	Sichuan, China	Decision (unanimous)	3	3:00
2010-04-25	Win	(England) Ben Barwise	Wu Lin Feng	Luoyang, China	Extension round decision	4	3:00
2009-11-27	Loss	(South Korea) Lee Su-Hwan	The Khan 2	Seoul, South Korea	TKO (left cross)	2	2:10
2009-10-26	Win	(Japan) Yuichiro Nagashima	K-1 World MAX 2009 World Championship Tournament Final	Yokohama, Japan	KO (left hook)	1	1:04
2009-08-30	Win	(Canada) Baxter Humby	WCK Muay Thai	Las Vegas, Nevada, USA	Decision (split)	3	3:00
2009-05-31	Loss	(Hong Kong) Heung Pak-Wing	The Challenger, Final	Macau	KO (right head kick)	1	0:15
For The Challenger -70 kg/154 lb Tournament Championship.
2009-05-31	Win	(Japan) Keiji Ozaki	The Challenger, Semi Finals	Macau	Decision (unanimous)	3	3:00
2009-03-20	Loss	(South Korea) Kim Se-Ki	K-1 Award & MAX Korea 2009	Seoul, South Korea	TKO (punches)	2	1:30
2009-01-18	Loss	(South Africa) Vuyisile Colossa	Legends of Heroes	Beijing, China	Decision (unanimous)	5	3:00
2008-01-12	Loss	(Thailand) Malaipet Sasiprapa	WCK: Full Rules Muaythai	Las Vegas, Nevada, USA	TKO (elbow injury)	1	2:43
2007-10-13	Win	(United States) Joey Pagliuso	Legends of Heroes	Shenzhen, China	Decision (unanimous)	3	3:00
2007-09-00	Win	(Thailand) Akarn Sannaha	IFB International Sanda Tournament, Final	Guangzhou, China	Decision	3	3:00
Wins the IFB International Sanda Tournament Championship.
2007-05-25	Loss	(Japan) Kenichi Ogata	Shoot Boxing 2007 Mu-So 2nd	Tokyo, Japan	KO (left knee to the body)	3	0:56
2007-01-27	Loss	(China) Zhao Zhao	Legends of Heroes	Beijing, China	Decision (unanimous)	3	3:00
Legend: Win Loss Draw/No contest Notes

== See also ==
- List of male kickboxers
