= Yuichiro Nagashima =

Japanese kickboxer

Yuichiro "Jienotsu" Nagashima
- Born: Nagashima Yūichirō; July 2, 1984 (age 42); Nishinomiya, Hyogo, Japan
- Native name: 長島☆自演乙☆雄一郎
- Other names: Jienotsu (short for Jisaku-Jien Otsukaresan)
- Nationality: (Japan) Japanese
- Height: 1.75 m (5 ft 9 in)
- Weight: 70.0 kg (154.3 lb; 11.02 st)
- Division: Middleweight
- Style: Nippon Kempo, Karate, Kickboxing
- Team: Sakigake Juku
- Rank: 2nd dan Black Belt in Nippon Kempo
- Years active: (2005-2018)

Kickboxing record
- Total: 38
- Wins: 19
- By knockout: 13
- Losses: 17
- By knockout: 7
- Draws: 2

Mixed martial arts record
- Total: 7
- Wins: 4
- By knockout: 3
- Losses: 3
- By knockout: 1
- By submission: 1

Other information
- University: University of Marketing and Distribution Sciences
- Notable relatives: Kengo Nagashima, brother
- Mixed martial arts record from Sherdog
- Last updated on: November 15, 2013

Yuichiro "Jienotsu" Nagashima (長島☆自演乙☆雄一郎, Nagashima Jien'otsu Yūichirō; born July 2, 1984) is a Japanese cosplayer, retired kickboxer, mixed martial artist, known for his career in K-1.

== Biography ==
Yuichiro Nagashima was born in 1984 in the city of Nishinomiya, Hyogo. He started learning Judo when he was an elementary school. He continued training Judo until the graduation of Middle School. During his High School life, he practiced Karate, but he attended training only once or twice a week. He first intended to become a Professional Wrestler, but was deemed too short, so he decided to be a fighter instead.

=== Mixed martial arts ===
Nagashima joined the team of Nippon Kempo and started training seriously when he was matriculated in University of Marketing and Distribution Sciences. In addition, Nagashima started participating professional mixed martial arts bouts. He also started cosplaying anime characters during his entrance to the ring.

=== Kickboxing ===
In 2007, Nagashima shifted his focus to kickboxing and has gone on to become known as the "Otaku Kickboxer" due to his love of anime and cosplay entrances before bouts. He won ten consecutive victories to start his career, fighting for Deep, Mars and New Japan Kickboxing Federation. On November 9, 2008, he defeated Teruaki Furukawa for the vacant NJKF Super welterweight title; this marked the first time a kickboxer from a non-NJKF affiliated gym had won an NJKF title. On January 25, 2009, he was chosen and awarded 2008 Outstanding Performance Award by NJKF, and also given 3 more awards certified combat sports medias.

==== K-1 ====
After winning the title, Nagashima was offered by K-1. He participated K-1 World MAX 2009 Japan Tournament on February 23, 2009, and he knocked out Hayato at 2R at the quarterfinal, but he was beaten by Yuya Yamamoto and lost by TKO because of being cut at the semifinal.

After the Japanese tournament, Nagashima was offered to fight against Albert Kraus from Netherlands on April 21. They engaged in a heated war of words before the bout where Kraus said "he seems to be a gay", while Nagashima demanded Kraus to cosplay Yoko Littner from Gurren Lagann if he lost the bout. The fight ended in Nagashima losing by knockout in round one. On October 26, Nagashima was offered to fight against Xu Yan from China. Although he trained at Masato's gym, he was knocked out at round one. In December, he was awarded the 2009 Walkout of the Year by Inside MMA of HDNet.

On March 27, 2010, Nagashima participated to K-1 World Max 2010 Japan tournament. He won the tournament with 3 consecutive knock outs. Although he wanted to defend his NJKF title after this tournament, he returned his title as on 1 April because he was going to participate the world tournament and it was hard to arrange his schedule for defending title.

On December 31, 2010, Nagashima took part in a "mixed rules" bout against Judo and Brazilian Jiu-Jitsu expert Shinya Aoki at Dynamite!! 2010, the annual New Year's Eve fight festival. One round was to be held under Kickboxing rules and the other under Mixed Martial Arts rules. A Coin Toss decided that the Kickboxing round was to commence first. Aoki took advantage of the fact that he only had to survive through a single three-minute round of Kickboxing and thus threw pointless attacks like flying dropkicks and rolling heel kicks while holding onto the ring ropes in order to run the clock down. As the second round began, and Aoki now in his element under MMA rules, he dropped immediately for a Double Leg Takedown, while Nagashima launched a Flying Knee square into Aoki's jaw. The blow instantly knocked out Aoki, after which Nagashima followed up with a number of hammerfists on the supine Aoki. The referee stepped in and stopped the fight four seconds into the period.

He faced Henri van Opstal at REBELS 13 in Tokyo on October 28, 2012 with a place at the Shoot Boxing World Tournament 2012 on the line. He lost via unanimous decision (30-29, 30-29, 29-28).

He lost a one-sided unanimous decision to Robin van Roosmalen at Glory 4: Tokyo - 2012 Heavyweight Grand Slam in Saitama, Japan on December 31, 2012 after being dropped in round one.

He lost to Yoshihiro Sato by unanimous decision at Hoost Cup: Kings in Nagoya, Japan on June 16, 2013.

Nagashima stopped a three-fight skid when he beat Hiroki Shishido by unanimous decision at Shoot Boxing Battle Summit Ground Zero Tokyo 2013 in Tokyo, Japan on November 15, 2013.

=== Professional wrestling ===
On March 6, 2011, Nagashima appeared in the puroresu promotion Pro Wrestling Zero1 to challenge fellow rookie Daichi Hashimoto, who was scheduled to face Masahiro Chono, and said that he had also made his debut in wrestling and soon would be Daichi's rival. Nagashima began training in the Zero1 dojo under Shinjiro Otani, who was also Hashimoto's trainer. Although Daichi was the original target to Yuichiro, veteran wrestler Kohei Sato offered to wrestle Nagashima first, so Yuichiro had his debut on May 5 at the Korakuen Hall against him, with th Otaku Kickboxer winning the bout. The match was highly praised and some said that Yuichiro's skill was such that he seemed to have years of experience. Later, on June 14, Yuichiro had his first match against Daichi, teaming with former yokozuna and K-1 fighter Akebono to defeat Hashimoto & Otani. Two months after, Nagashima teamed up with Hashimoto and Otani to defeat Ryoji Sai, Kamikaze & Munenori Sawa.

After their last meeting, Nagashima announced his intention to face Masahiro Chono, who had wrestled against Hashimoto. Chono agreed and the match was held in Inoki Genome Federation, with Nagashima in the losing side. Thereafter, Yuichiro began competing actively for IGF, achieving significant victories over Munenori Sawa and Bob Sapp. Upon his return to Zero1, Nagashima came in a feud with Fujita Hayato, being defeated by Fujita in a singles match. This was his final match of the year, as Nagashima returned to kickboxing shortly after.

In 2013, Nagashima made a return to pro wrestling in IGF, beating Black Tiger in two consecutive matches.

=== Lethwei ===
In February 2020, Nagashima made his debut in Lethwei rules against Burmese Aut Chin Thwai. Nagashima lost after he injured his leg at the third round. He entered the match wearing the first anime cosplay he wore in his career, that of Haruhi Suzumiya from the eponymous franchise, and suggested this was his last fight.

=== Retirement ===
On September 23, 2021, Nahashima was scheduled to face Shohei Asahara, Yasuomi Soda and Yusaku Nakamura in his retirement exhibition match at DEEP☆KICK 55. As in the previous occasion, he came to the match wearing a significant cosplay, the same Miku Hatsune costume he wore in his K-1 championship in November 2008, and thanked the fans for their support in his 14 years career.

== Titles ==
- Professional
  - 2010 K-1 World MAX 2010 -70kg Japan Tournament winner
  - 2008 The 1st New Japan Kickboxing Federation Super welterweight champion
  - 2008 MARS Blaster bout tournament A block winner
  - 2006 RR Lightweight tournament winner
- Amateur
  - 2006 Kempo 7th West Japan Championship 4th place
  - Kakuto Yuseikai Karate 8th championship winner
  - 2006 Nippon Kempo 61st National Sports Festival Runner Up

== Awards ==
- 2008 Outstanding Performance Award (NJKF, January 25, 2009)
- 2008 Kakutogi Tsushin Award (NJKF, January 25, 2009)
- 2008 Fullcontact KARATE Award (NJKF, January 25, 2009)
- 2008 BoutReview Award (NJKF, January 25, 2009)
- 2009 Walkout of the Year (Inside MMA of HDNet, December 2009)

== Lethwei record ==
Professional Lethwei record
0 wins, 1 losses, 0 draws
Date	Result	Opponent	Event	Location	Method	Round
2020-02-22	Loss	(Myanmar) Aut Chin Thwai	Lethwei in Japan 15: Kizuna	Osaka, Japan	KO	3
Legend: Win Loss Draw Notes

== Kickboxing record ==
Professional Kickboxing record
21 Wins (13 (T)KO's), 18 Losses, 2 Draw
Date	Result	Opponent	Event	Location	Method	Round	Time
2018-01-27	Loss	(China) Qiu Jianliang	Glory of Heroes: Qingdao	Qingdao, China	TKO (Punches)	3	1:23
2017-11-26	Loss	(Thailand) Chuchai Kaewsamrit	HOOST CUP KINGS OSAKA 2	Osaka, Japan	Decision (unanimous)	3	3:00
2017-04-23	Loss	(Russia) Artem Pashporin	Kunlun Fight 60 – 70 kg World Max 2017 Group G Tournament Semi-Finals	Zunyi, China	TKO (Ref.stop/3 Knockdowns)	2	1:22
2016-12-05	Loss	(Japan) Takuya Imamura	KNOCK OUT Vol.0	Japan	KO (Right Cross)	2	
2016-10-30	Draw	(China) Tian Xin	Kunlun Fight 54 - Super Fight	Wuhan, China	Extra Round Decision (Draw)	4	3:00
2016-06-05	Loss	(China) Gu Hui	Kunlun Fight 45 - Qualification tournament for 70 kg 16 man Tournament Group E Semi Final	Chengdu, China	Decision (Unanimous)	3	3:00
2015-10-03	Loss	(China) Li Yankun	XTREME MUAY THAI 2015 The Venetian Macao	Macao, China	Decision (unanimous)	3	3:00
2015-04-05	Loss	(Japan) Nishikawa Yasuhira	DEEP	Tokyo, Japan	Decision (unanimous)	3	3:00
2015-02-21	Loss	(Japan) Yuki Sakamoto	Shoot Boxing 2015 act. I	Tokyo, Japan	Decision (unanimous)	3	3:00
2015-01-31	Draw	(China) Yi Long	Wu Lin Feng World Championship 2015	Chongqing, China	Decision (Unanimous)	3	3:00
2014-12-29	Loss	(Japan) Hinata	Blade 1	Tokyo, Japan	Decision	3	3:00
2014-11-16	Loss	(Thailand) Jenrop Punpanmuang	HOOST CUP KINGS WEST	Osaka, Japan	Decision (Unanimous)	3	3:00
2014-09-09	Win	(China) Yi Long	Wu Lin Feng	Khorgos, China	Decision (Unanimous)	3	3:00
2014-06-16	Loss	(Brazil) Danilo Zanolini	RISE 100 - Blade 0 -	Tokyo, Japan	DQ (Fouls)		
2014-04-29	Win	(Japan) Daiki Watabe	RISE 99	Tokyo, Japan	Ext.R Decision (Unanimous)	4	3:00
2013-11-15	Win	(Japan) Hiroki Shishido	Shoot Boxing Battle Summit Ground Zero Tokyo 2013	Tokyo, Japan	Decision (Unanimous)	3	3:00
2013-10-14	Win	(Thailand) Tanansak SuranareeGym	M-FIGHT ～Shuken 13～ Part 2	Tokyo, Japan	Decision (Unanimous)	3	3:00
2013-06-16	Loss	(Japan) Yoshihiro Sato	Hoost Cup: Kings	Nagoya, Japan	Decision (unanimous)	3	3:00
2012-12-31	Loss	(Netherlands) Robin van Roosmalen	Glory 4: Tokyo	Saitama, Japan	Decision (Unanimous)	3	3:00
2012-10-28	Loss	(Netherlands) Henri van Opstal	REBELS.13	Tokyo, Japan	Decision (Unanimous)	3	3:00
2011-09-25	Win	(Japan) Kenmun	K-1 World MAX 2011 –70 kg Japan Tournament Final	Osaka, Japan	Decision (Unanimous)	3	3:00
2010-11-08	Loss	(Greece) Mike Zambidis	K-1 World MAX 2010 Final Quarter-final	Tokyo, Japan	TKO (Referee Stoppage)	3	0:53
2010-07-05	Win	(Brazil) Andre Dida	K-1 World MAX 2010 Final 16 - Part 1	Tokyo, Japan	Decision (Majority)	3	3:00
Qualifies for K-1 World MAX 2010 Final.
2010-03-27	Win	(Japan) Hiroki Nakajima	K-1 World MAX 2010 -70kg Japan Tournament Final	Saitama, Japan	KO (Right Hook)	3	1:58
Wins K-1 World Max 2010 Japan Tournament.
2010-03-27	Win	(Japan) Ryuji	K-1 World MAX 2010 -70kg Japan Tournament Semifinal	Saitama, Japan	TKO (Referee Stoppage)	1	1:44
2010-03-27	Win	(Japan) Yuji Nashiro	K-1 World MAX 2010 -70kg Japan Tournament Quarterfinal	Saitama, Japan	TKO (Referee Stoppage)	1	0:39
2009-10-26	Loss	(China) Xu Yan	K-1 World MAX 2009 World Championship Tournament Final	Yokohama, Japan	KO (Left Hook)	1	1:04
2009-04-21	Loss	(Netherlands) Albert Kraus	K-1 World MAX 2009 World Championship Tournament Final 16	Tokyo, Japan	KO (Punches)	1	1:07
2009-02-23	Loss	(Japan) Yuya Yamamoto	K-1 World MAX 2009 Japan Tournament Semi-final	Tokyo, Japan	TKO (Doctor Stoppage)	3	0:59
2009-02-23	Win	(Japan) Hayato	K-1 World MAX 2009 Japan Tournament Quarter-final	Tokyo, Japan	TKO (Referee Stoppage)	2	0:36
2008-12-22	Win	(Thailand) Sakushi	DEEP Protect Impact 2008	Tokyo, Japan	TKO (Doctor Stoppage)	2	0:39
2008-11-09	Win	(Japan) Teruaki Furukawa	NJKF "Start of the New Legend XIII"	Tokyo, Japan	TKO (Referee Stoppage)	1	1:04
Winning the vacant 1st NJKF Super welterweight championship.
2008-09-27	Win	(Japan) Soichiro Miyakoshi	NJKF "Start of the New Legend XI"	Tokyo, Japan	TKO (Referee Stoppage)	1	1:50
2008-06-08	Win	(Japan) Kenta	NJKF West Swell	Osaka, Japan	Decision (Majority 2-1)	5	3:00
2008-05-03	Win	(Thailand) Marmai	Khaolak stadium	Khao Lak, Thailand	KO	4	
2008-02-11	Win	(South Korea) Shine Soo	'MARS 11 2nd Anniversary MARS Blaster Bout Tournament A block Final	Tokyo, Japan	KO (Left Hook)	3	0:18
Winning MARS Blaster Bout Tournament A block. MARS was dissolved before fighting against the winner from B block.
2008-02-11	Win	(Thailand) K.Worwanchai	"MARS 11 2nd Anniversary MARS Blaster Bout Tournament A block" Semi-final	Tokyo, Japan	Decision (Unanimous)	2	3:00
2007-12-09	Win	(Japan) Norimasa Iwasaki	MARS 10 "All-Out War"	Tokyo, Japan	Decision (Unanimous)	3	3:00
2007-10-13	Win	(Japan) Junichi Maruyama	MARS 09	Osaka, Japan	TKO (Referee Stoppage)	1	2:27
2007-07-08	Win	(Japan) Kenji Ueda	DEEP 30 Impact	Osaka, Japan	KO	1	1:38
2007-04-15	Win	(Japan) Fumihito Fukano	NJKF "Fighting Evolution IV Kenshinjuku 10th anniversary event"	Osaka, Japan	KO (Right High Kick)	1	2:04

== Mixed martial arts record ==
Professional record breakdown
7 matches	4 wins	3 losses
By knockout	4	1
By submission	0	1
By decision	0	1

Res.	Record	Opponent	Method	Event	Date	Round	Time	Location	Notes
Loss	4-3	Andy Souwer	KO (punches)	Rizin Fighting Federation 2	December 31, 2015	1	5:28	Saitama, Japan	
Loss	4-2	Hiroshi Shiba	Decision (Unanimous)	Real Rhythm: 5th Stage	November 18, 2006	2	5:00	Osaka, Japan	
Win	4-1	Hiromu Nagado	KO (Punch)	Pancrase: Blow 8	October 1, 2006	1	0:12	Osaka, Japan	
Win	3-1	Yusuke Kagiyama	KO (Punches)	Real Rhythm: 4th Stage	July 30, 2006	1	3:45	Osaka, Japan	
Win	2-1	Tsuneo Kimura	TKO (Punches)	Double R: 3rd Stage	April 29, 2006	1	0:41	Osaka, Japan	
Win	1-1	Tsuyoshi Ono	TKO (Punches)	Double R: 3rd Stage	April 29, 2006	1	0:37	Osaka, Japan	
Loss	0-1	Satoru Takadaya	Submission (Armbar)	Powergate 2: War Cry Of Soul	August 27, 2005	1	1:59	Osaka, Japan	

== Mixed rules record ==
Professional record breakdown
3 matches	1 win	2 losses
By knockout	1	2
By submission	0	0
By decision	0	0

Res.	Record	Opponent	Method	Event	Date	Round	Time	Location	Notes
Loss	1-2	Xu Xiaodong	TKO (Punches)	Lumpinee Boxing Stadium	November 22, 2019	2	0:35	Bangkok, Thailand	
Loss	1-1	Katsunori Kikuno	TKO (Punches)	Fight For Japan: Genki Desu Ka Omisoka 2011	December 31, 2011	2	2:34	Saitama City, Saitama, Japan	
Win	1–0	Shinya Aoki	KO (Flying Knee)	Dynamite!! 2010	December 31, 2010	2	0:04	Chūō-ku, Saitama, Japan	

Legend: Win Loss Draw/No contest Notes

== See also ==
- List of male kickboxers
- List of K-1 events
