= Giorgio Petrosyan =

Italian-Armenian kickboxer (born 1985)

Giorgio Petrosyan Գևորգ Պետրոսյան
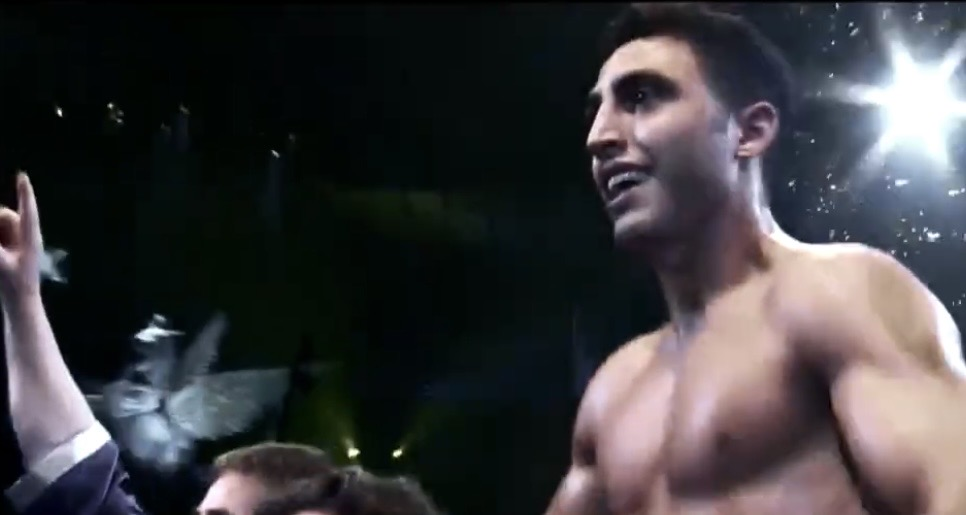
- Born: Gevorg Petrosyan; December 10, 1985 (age 40); Yerevan, Armenian SSR, Soviet Union
- Nickname: The Doctor
- Nationality: Armenian; Italian
- Height: 1.78 m (5 ft 10 in)
- Weight: 70 kg (154 lb; 11 st)
- Division: Bantamweight; Featherweight; Lightweight; Welterweight; Middleweight
- Reach: 73.0 in (185 cm)
- Style: Kickboxing, Muay Thai
- Stance: Southpaw
- Fighting out of: Gorizia, Italy
- Team: Fight1
- Years active: 2002–2025

Kickboxing record
- Total: 116
- Wins: 109
- By knockout: 43
- Losses: 3
- By knockout: 2
- Draws: 2
- No contests: 2

Other information
- Notable relatives: Armen Petrosyan (brother)
- Website: giorgiopetrosyan.it

Gevorg "Giorgio" Petrosyan (Armenian: Գևորգ Պետրոսյան; born December 10, 1985) is an Armenian-Italian former kickboxer who competed in the middleweight division. Nicknamed "The Doctor", he is noted for supreme technical skills, ringsmanship, and defensive prowess which has seen him defeat some of the best strikers in the world while taking little damage. He is widely regarded as one of the greatest kickboxers of all time.

After immigrating to Italy from Armenia at thirteen years old, Petrosyan began his professional career as a Muay Thai fighter at sixteen, starting out as a -54 kg/119 lb bantamweight before moving up through the weight classes and settling at the -70 kg/154 lb middleweight division, taking numerous titles along the way. Following a decision loss to Nonthanan Por. Pramuk at Lumpinee Stadium in January 2007, he went on a six-year, forty-two fight undefeated streak considered to be one of the most dominant reigns in the history of the sport which was eventually ended by Andy Ristie at Glory 12: New York in November 2013.

His switch to kickboxing rules and subsequent ascent began in 2008 when he began competing for It's Showtime and K-1, and he established himself as the world's top middleweight with two consecutive K-1 World MAX World Championship Tournament Championships in 2009 and 2010. He then joined Glory in 2012 following It's Showtime and K-1's demise and further cemented his place as the elite -70 kg/154 lb kickboxer by winning the Glory 2012 Lightweight Slam tournament.

== Early life ==
Petrosyan was Born in Yerevan, Armenian Soviet Socialist Republic, Soviet Union (now Armenia) to Armenian parents on December 10, 1985, as Gevorg Petrosyan, he emigrated to Italy at the age of thirteen with his father, Andranik, and older brother, Stepan, arriving illegally in the country in the back of a truck. They initially lived homeless in Milan, sleeping in train stations and on the streets, but were later taken in by a family in Gorizia who offered them work as night watchmen at their factory. After settling in Italy, he was soon joined by his mother, Karine, sister, Lianna, and younger brother, Armen, who is also a world champion kickboxer.

Inspired by Bruce Lee and Jean-Claude Van Damme martial arts films, Petrosyan decided to begin training in Muay Thai at fourteen years old but was initially turned away from the gym for being too small. He persisted, however, and eventually started his training under Alfio Romanut at the Satori Gladiatorium Nemesis gym and had his first fight at the age of sixteen. He continues to reside in Gorizia in Northern Italy and worked as a bricklayer early in his career.

== Career ==
=== Muay Thai beginnings and early career (2002–2006) ===
Giorgio Petrosyan started his career as a -54 kg/119 lb bantamweight at the age of sixteen and defeated a local Italian fighter in his February 2002 debut, breaking his toes while doing so. He turned professional shortly after and would compete almost exclusively under Muay Thai rules for the next five years. In his first title fight on November 9, 2003, he scored a third round knockout over Gionata Zarbo to be crowned the Muay Thai Association (MTA) Italian national champion. Steadily moving up in weight and competition level, he captured the MTA European -65 kg/143 lb Championship by outpointing Fabio Pinca in 2004 before making his only successful defence of the belt in February 2005 with another points win over Shemsi Beqiri in his home town of Gorizia. He fought to a draw with three-time Lumpinee Stadium champion Pinsinchai in Bologna, Italy on April 10, 2005, but soon returned to the win column and defeated Olivier Tchétché by second round technical knockout in a WMC Intercontinental Welterweight (-66.7 kg/147 lb) Championship match in Nova Gorica, Slovenia on June 25, 2005.

Petrosyan then made the journey to Thailand to train, visiting the WMC Samui Gym in Ko Samui and Tor. Silachai in Nakhon Ratchasima. He stopped Thai fighter Petch with a low kick in round three at Phetch Buncha Samui Stadium in Ko Samui in February 2006 before returning to Italy to compete in the Italian Extreme IV four-man tournament in Modena on April 1, 2006, which he ran through, finishing both opponents in the first round. He floored Richard Barnhill with a left hook before putting him away with a low kick in the semi-finals and gave an almost identical performance in the final when he dispatched Roel Rink with a leg kick shortly after knocking him down with a right hook. This also marked the third consecutive fight in which Petrosyan had stopped opponents with low kicks. He became a world champion for the first time on June 10, 2006, by knocking out Benito Caupain with a first round high kick to win the vacant Kombat League World -66.7 kg/147 lb Muay Thai Championship in Nova Gorica. He would go on to successfully defend this title three times before the end of the year; TKOing Johnny Tancray in round four in Sardinia, Italy on August 5, KOing Frankie Hudders in round two in Pordenone, Italy on September 5 and winning a unanimous decision over Imro Main in Enschede, Netherlands on November 19.

Moving up to middleweight, Petrosyan marked his arrival in the weight class that he would go on to dominate by winning the eight-man 72 kg/158 lb tournament at Janus Fight Night 2006 in Padua, Italy, on December 2, 2006. He took a unanimous decision win against Cédric Muller in the quarter-finals and TKO'd Frane Radnić in the semis, knocking him down twice in round one with a left cross to the solar plexus, before beating Marco Piqué via another unanimous decision in the final.

=== First defeat and subsequent kickboxing breakthrough (2007–2008) ===
Petrosyan fought at the historic Lumpinee Stadium in Bangkok, Thailand for the first time on January 23, 2007, where he was also handed the first loss of his career, dropping a decision to Nonthanan Por. Pramuk. In an interview, Petrosyan said the promoters required him to drink an extra two litres of water after he weighed in at 70 kg, two kilograms below the agreed upon weight of 72 kg. The drink given to Petrosyan caused him to have stomach cramps and made it very difficult for him to fight, though he decided to go through with it anyway. After the bout, Nonthanan retired, quickly ending the possibility of a rematch.

He was able to bounce back from this loss by recording back-to-back wins, a third-round TKO of Sadio Cissoko on March 17, 2007, and a unanimous decision over Arslan Magomedov on April 14, 2007, at K-1 Italy Oktagon 2007, both fights taking place in Milan, Italy. From there, he was offered the biggest fight of his career at that point when he replaced John Wayne Parr, who withdrew after injuring his ribs training with Nathan Corbett, to challenge Buakaw Por. Pramuk for his WMC World Junior Middleweight (-69.8 kg/154 lb) Championship at K-1 Fighting Network Scandinavian Qualification 2007 in Stockholm, Sweden on May 19, 2007. After five rounds, the fight was ruled a split draw and, consequently, Buakaw retained his title.

Petrosyan then went on to defeat Abdallah Mabel twice within two months in his next couple of fights, decisioning him in Padua on May 26, 2007, and then TKOing him in Trieste on July 27, 2007. After a first-round knockout of Behrouz Rastagar in Arnhem, Netherlands on October 13, 2007, he entered the Janus Fight Night 2007 -72 kg/158 lb tournament (the event he had won a year previously) on November 24, 2007. In the quarter-finals, he beat José Reis by unanimous decision. Then, in the semis, he met Abdallah Mabel for the third time in six months and bested the Frenchman once again, winning another unanimous decision. In the final, Petrosyan defeated another familiar opponent by unanimous decision, Marco Piqué, who he had also faced in the final the previous year.

In early 2008, Petrosyan made the transition to Oriental rules kickboxing when he signed with the It's Showtime organization, making his promotional debut with a unanimous decision victory over Luís Reis at Balans: It's Showtime 75MAX Trophy Final 2008 in 's-Hertogenbosch, Netherlands on March 15, 2008. April 2008 was another pivotal month in Petrosyan's career as he made his first foray onto the K-1 circuit, TKOing Mikel Colaj in five at K-1 Italy Oktagon 2008 in Milan on the twelfth and forcing two second round standing eight counts en route to taking a unanimous decision over Chris Ngimbi at the K-1 World Grand Prix 2008 in Amsterdam supercard at the Amsterdam ArenA on the twenty sixth.

Following a brief return to the Muay Thai scene with wins over Çağrı Ermiş in Tilburg, Netherlands, on May 24, 2008, and Rafik Bakkouri in Abano Terme, Italy, on June 28, 2008, Petrosyan did not fight again until November when he took to the ring twice within three weeks. On November 8, he beat Naruepol Fairtex by unanimous decision at Janus Fight Night: The Legend. Then, on November 29, he took another decision over Warren Stevelmans at It's Showtime 2008 Eindhoven.

=== Consecutive K-1 World MAX Tournament Championships (2009–2010) ===
Petrosyan took the World Kickboxing Network (WKN) Intercontinental Welterweight (-69.9 kg/154 lb) Oriental Championship on January 31, 2009, when he stopped David Javakhia with a liver kick inside the opening stanza in Turin, Italy. On March 14, 2009, at Oktagon presents: It's Showtime 2009 in Milan, he scored his first win over a truly elite fighter, taking a points victory against Andy Souwer. Using just about everything in his arsenal to keep Andy Souwer off-balance and out of his range, Petrosyan was seemingly in control of the exchanges. However, the fight got dramatic when the judges unexpectedly ruled it a draw after three rounds, sending the fight into an extension round to decide the winner. Things got even more heated when Souwer was dropped by a punch in the extension round and referee Joop Ubeda declined to give him a count. In the end, the judges saw things the way of Petrosyan and gave him the unanimous decision, in what was considered a major upset.

Sporting an impressive 53-1-2 record and now holding a victory over a two-time K-1 MAX champion in Souwer, Petrosyan was invited to compete in the annual K-1 World MAX Tournament for the first time. At the tournament's opening round at the K-1 World MAX 2009 World Championship Tournament Final 16 in Fukuoka, Japan on April 21, 2009, he controlled Dzhabar Askerov for two rounds before putting him away with a knee to the midsection in three.

Following a unanimous decision win against Faldir Chahbari at It's Showtime 2009 Amsterdam on May 16, 2009, Petrosyan faced another one-time K-1 MAX champion in the form of Albert Kraus in the tournament's quarter-final stage at the K-1 World MAX 2009 World Championship Tournament Final 8 in Tokyo, Japan on July 13, 2009. Petrosyan defeated him soundly, winning a unanimous decision and qualifying for the round of four three months later. On October 26, 2009, at the K-1 World MAX 2009 World Championship Tournament Final in Yokohama, Japan, he defeated Yuya Yamamoto in the semi-finals but suffered a broken hand in the process. In round one, he dropped Yamamoto with a left hook, but the Japanese fighter was able to return to his feet following the referee's count. He was still visibly hurt, however, and Petrosyan swarmed to knock him out with a right hook seconds later. Advancing to the final despite his hand injury, he met Andy Souwer for the second time. Petrosyan dominated all three rounds, and dropped Souwer with a knee to the body in the second, en route to a unanimous decision victory, clinching the coveted K-1 World MAX Tournament Championship.

As the reigning K-1 MAX champion, Petrosyan was scheduled to face Masato in the Japanese legend's retirement match at Dynamite!! 2009 in Saitama, Japan on December 31, 2009 but his broken hand kept him out of the fight and he was replaced by Andy Souwer. He instead returned to the ring on January 30, 2010, defending his WKN intercontinental title against Mohamed Diaby in Turin. Although giving up a sizable reach advantage to the lanky Diaby, Petrosyan was able to get inside and constantly connect. Midway through round one, he connected with a clean punch, dropping the Frenchman. In round two, he continued the pressure, peppering Diaby with shots and earning a second knockdown when Diaby simply could not stand any longer. Diaby gamely made it to his feet, but his corner had seen enough and threw in the towel.

He earned a unanimous decision win against Kem Sitsongpeenong in a competitive match, the Thai fighter's first under kickboxing the rule set, at Oktagon presents: It's Showtime 2010 in Milan on March 13, 2010 but reinjured his hand in doing so and thus two more proposed matchups, a March 27 meeting with Yoshihiro Sato at the K-1 World MAX 2010 –70 kg Japan Tournament in Saitama and a fight with Nieky Holzken at It's Showtime 2010 Amsterdam on May 29, were shelved.

After healing up from his injuries, Petrosyan made his comeback to K-1 and entered into the K-1 World MAX 2010 Tournament, winning a unanimous decision against Vitaly Gurkov in the round of sixteen at the K-1 World MAX 2010 in Seoul World Championship Tournament Final 16 in Seoul, South Korea on October 3, 2010. After a clear 10-9 opening round, the reigning champion began really picking the tall Belarusian apart with counterpunches, catching kicks and slipping punches en route to another dominant second frame. By the third round, Gurkov's nose was bloodied and busted, and the Belarusian could offer up no reply to "The Doctor's" surgical strikes. A fighter with an extensive Muay Thai background, Gurkov also spent much of the fight clinched up and was eventually yellow carded for such action.

At the K-1 World MAX 2010 World Championship Tournament Final in Tokyo on November 8, 2010, he again met with Albert Kraus in the quarter-finals and the match was identical to the pair's first meeting a year earlier as the Dutchman found himself being countered for the majority of the fight and lost a wide unanimous decision. Against Mike Zambidis in the semis, while the short Greek aggressively pursued him around the ring with leaping hooks and haymakers, Petrosyan evaded and further countered him with punches and step knees en route to another UD victory. In the final, he faced off against home town fighter Yoshihiro Sato. Although Sato's height and reach advantage caused him some problems, Petrosyan was still able to dominate the match and took the unanimous decision victory to be crowned the K-1 World MAX champion for the second year in-a-row and become the only fighter ever to defend a K-1 MAX title.

Just as in the 2009 K-1 MAX Tournament, Petrosyan broke his hand for the third time during the 2010 edition. This injury caused him to withdraw from a planned fight with Pajonsuk SuperPro Samui at Yiannis Evgenikos presents: It's Showtime Athens in Athens, Greece on December 11, 2010, in which he was replaced by Andy Souwer.

=== Further hand injuries and promotional problems (2011–2012) ===
Giorgio Petrosyan was initially due to take on Yohan Lidon at Thai Boxe Mania 2011 in Turin on January 29, 2011, but the Frenchman withdrew in advance after conceding that he would be unable to make the -70 kg/154 lb weight limit. Sudsakorn Sor Klinmee stepped in as his replacement and ran the Petrosyan relatively close in match that showed why both men are where they are in the sport but Petrosyan nonetheless had the upper hand throughout the fight and was able to pull off the unanimous decision victory. He then defeated Cosmo Alexandre by UD at the Fight Code: Dragon Series 2011 - Round 2 in Milan on March 12, 2013.

Although a fourth match with Abdallah Mabel was rumoured for the May 14, 2011 It's Showtime 2011 Lyon event in Lyon, France, Petrosyan eventually fought Chahid Oulad El Hadj and, after dominating the first two rounds, accidentally kicked El Hadj in the groin in round three. El Hadj could not continue and the bout was ruled a no contest.

On July 18, 2011, in Tokyo at REBELS 8 & It's Showtime Japan Countdown-1, Petrosyan dominated Hinata to a unanimous points victory, controlling the fight by slipping almost all of Hinata's punches, checking low kicks and catching body kicks to disrupt his opponent's rhythm. The Japanese fighter's lack of head movement also made him an easy target for Petrosyan's superior boxing. However, he broke his hand a fourth time in the match.

With K-1 experiencing extreme financial difficulties, the K-1 World MAX was not organized in 2011 and It's Showtime instead held its own high-level middleweight tournament, It's Showtime "Fast & Furious 70MAX", in Brussels, Belgium on September 25, 2011. Petrosyan was set to take part but his broken hand forced him to withdraw and he was replaced by Robin van Roosmalen who went on to win the competition.

After having surgery on his hand, he took to the ring again in a fight with an unheralded Zeben Díaz at Street Culture, Fight Club Group & Canary Kickboxing Federation presents: It's Showtime 53 in Tenerife, Spain on November 12, 2011. The Spanish judges scored the bout a split decision in favour of Petrosyan in a fight more straightforward than the scorecards may suggest.

In January 2012, Petrosyan terminated his contract with It's Showtime, which acted as his management team as well as his promoter, due to them not being able to secure the money he was owed by K-1 for winning the 2010 K-1 World MAX tournament. He stated "I think I have shown enough patience. I have been repeatedly guaranteed the compensation due. Twelve months have passed without anything, following a number of promises to pay. I remain willing to fight for anyone interested in giving me his gala tournaments, with no limits or proprietary."

Now a free agent, he returned to Italy to fight independently and in his first outing since leaving It's Showtime defeated Abraham Roqueñi via unanimous decision at Yokkao Extreme 2012 in Milan on January 21, 2012. Then, in a much anticipated match-up with Artur Kyshenko at Oktagon 2012 in Milan on March 24, 2012, Petrosyan once again displayed his dominance, outworking the Ukrainian every step of the way to take the win on all three judges scorecards.

=== Glory (2012–2015) ===
Petrosyan signed with the newly founded Glory organization a week after the Kyshenko fight and was immediately entered into the forthcoming Glory 2012 Lightweight (-70 kg/154 lb) Slam tournament. At the Lightweight Slam's opening round at Glory 1: Stockholm on May 26, 2012, Petrosyan was drawn against Fabio Pinca in a rematch eight years in the making. Petrosyan went to work from the beginning, attacking his opponent. Pinca was able to withstand the onslaught, however, and even pressed the issue on becoming more offensive minded in the fight. As the match went on, Petrosyan used this as an advantage and methodically countered with hooks and liver kicks. Petrosyan's elusiveness was also on display as he ducked and weaved out of the way of Pinca's punches and answered with a counter strike every time before winning a unanimous decision to advance to the round of eight.

Moving on to Glory 3: Rome on November 3, 2012, in Rome, Italy, Petrosyan went up against Ky Hollenbeck in the quarter-finals, winning by TKO when Hollenbeck suffered a torn anterior cruciate ligament in the second round after dropping the American with a perfectly timed left hook in the first. He then beat Davit Kiria by unanimous decision in the semis and, in the final, faced Robin van Roosmalen in a highly anticipated showdown. Petrosyan was able to nullify the hard-punching Dutchman by using rangy jabs and lead teep kicks to control the distance while landing power combos at will and took the unanimous points victory to win the third major tournament of his career.

In a one-off match outside of Glory in Trieste on March 2, 2013, he turned in an uncharacteristically aggressive performance against Ole Laursen as he dropped Laursen with a knee to the liver before knocking him out with a high kick immediately after, leaving the outmatched Dane unconscious on the canvas for several minutes. This was Petrosyan's his first legitimate stoppage win in three years.

Cruising to a UD against Hafid El Boustati at Glory 7: Milan on April 20, 2013, Petrosyan put on a lesson in footwork, timing, and ring generalship as El Boustati landed maybe two or three shots the entire fight, while simultaneously getting countered, punched, kneed, and body-kicked.

Competing in the Glory 12: New York - Lightweight World Championship Tournament in New York City, New York, United States on November 23, 2013, Petrosyan was knocked out for the first time by eventual champion Andy Ristie in the semi-finals. He was unable to find his rhythm due to the Surinamese fighter's pressure but nonetheless remained in control for the first two rounds of the match. In the third, however, Ristie came out aggressively, landing a right hand by way of a switch-step that had Petrosyan stunned and following up with a left uppercut, putting an end to Petrosyan's forty-two fight, six year undefeated streak. After the fight, Petrosyan revealed that he had broken his hand early in the first round.

Petrosyan faced Artem Pashporin for the W5 71 kg world title on February 18, 2017, at W5 Grand Prix Kitek in Russia. He won the fight by unanimous decision.

In his second bout for Bellator Kickboxing, Petrosyan faced Amansio Paraschiv at Bellator Kickboxing 5 on April 8, 2017. He won the fight by unanimous decision.

Petrosyan was scheduled to fight Jonay Risco for the ISKA Super Welterweight (-70 kg/154 lb) K-1 Rules World Championship at PetrosyanMania in Monza, Italy on October 14, 2017. However, Risco withdrew due to injury and Petrosyan instead fought Chris Ngimbi for the vacant title. Petrosyan won via unanimous decision and became the new ISKA Super Welterweight K-1 World Champion.

On July 14, 2018, at Bellator Kickboxing 10 in Rome, Italy, Petrosyan defeated Chingiz Allazov by unanimous decision, scoring a knock down in the first round.

=== ONE Championship (since 2018) ===
In April 2018, Petrosyan signed with ONE Championship, unveiling their Super Series segment as a figurehead, a venture which would intertwine kickboxing and Muay Thai bouts within their MMA based events. Petrosyan found himself in the co-main event slot for ONE: Heroes of Honor in Manila, Philippines, squaring off against Lion Fight veteran Jo Nattawut, a bout the Armenian-Italian won with his technical defensive kickboxing expertise via a unanimous decision.

After securing the Bellator Kickboxing lightweight championship on a one-fight stint in July, Petrosyan returned to the Asian stage in November, for ONE: Heart Of a Lion, taking on Lumpinee Stadium Muay Thai champion Sorgraw Petchyindee Academy.

Petrosyan returned in February 2019, competing for a second time in his brother Armen's kickboxing promotion, PetrosyanMania. He successfully defended his ISKA Super Welterweight (-70 kg/154 lb) K-1 Rules World Championship against Japanese kickboxer Atsushi Tamefusa. Petrosyan was expected to return to ONE later that year, having recently being announced as a participant in the upcoming ONE Super Series Kickboxing Featherweight Grand Prix. The event was expected to start around May.

In the Grand Prix Quarter-Finals, he faced Phetmorakot Petchyindee Academy on May 17, 2019, at ONE Championship: Enter the Dragon. Petrosyan lost by split decision but the result was reversed to a no contest due to illegal clinching and a rematch was scheduled for ONE Championship: Masters of Destiny. On July 12, 2019, Petrosyan defeated Phetmorakot by unanimous decision to advance to the Grand Prix Semi-Finals, where he was scheduled to face Jo Nattawut for a second time. On August 16, 2019, Petrosyan defeated Jo Nattawut by KO in the first round at ONE Championship: Dreams of Gold. In doing so, he advanced to the ONE Super Series Kickboxing Featherweight Grand Prix Final, where he is scheduled to face Samy Sana at ONE Championship: Century.

On October 13, 2019, Petrosyan defeated Samy Sana by unanimous decision in the Grand Prix Final to become the inaugural ONE Kickboxing Featherweight World Grand Prix Champion, in addition to winning a USD$1 million cash prize.

Petrosyan next faced former Glory and Kunlun Fight champion Davit Kiria, who made his ONE debut, at ONE Championship: Fists Of Fury on February 26, 2021. Petrosyan won the fight by unanimous decision.

Petrosyan was next scheduled to face Superbon Banchamek for the inaugural ONE Featherweight Kickboxing World Championship at ONE Championship: First Strike on October 15, 2021. Petrosyan, the heavy favorite, lost via second-round right high kick knockout, suffering his first loss since 2013 and the second-ever knockout loss of his career. Petrosyan was later revealed to have suffered a broken jaw, for which he would undergo surgery to repair.

Petrosyan was expected to face Khambakhadov Saifullah for the ISKA Super Welterweight K-1 Rules World Championship at PetrosyanMania on December 4, 2021. However, the event was postponed due to Petrosyans's injury and is now scheduled to take place on April 30, 2022. Khambakhadov was replaced by Fatih Aydin. Petrosyan won the fight by TKO in the second round.

Petrosyan challenged the WAKO Pro K-1 World Super Welterweight (69.1 kg) champion Sergio Sanchez at PetrosyanMania GOLD EDITION on May 18, 2024. He won the fight by unanimous decision.

== Championships and accomplishments ==
- World Association of Kickboxing Organizations
  - 2024 WAKO Pro K-1 World Super Welterweight (69.1 kg) Championship
    - Two successful title defenses
- ONE Championship
  - 2019 ONE Kickboxing Featherweight (-70 kg/155 lb) World Grand Prix Champion
- World version W5
  - 2017 W5 World -71 kg Champion
- Glory
  - Glory 2012 70kg Slam Tournament Championship
- Hero Legends
  - 2015 Hero Legends -70 kg Championship
- International Sport Karate Association
  - 2017 ISKA K-1 World Super Welterweight (-70 kg/154 lb) Championship
    - Two successful title defence
- Italian Extreme
  - Italian Extreme IV Tournament Championship
- Janus Fight Night
  - JFN 2006 −72 kg/158 lb Tournament Championship
  - JFN 2007 −72 kg/158 lb Tournament Championship
- K-1
  - K-1 World MAX 2009 World Championship Tournament (-70 kg/154 lb) Championship
  - K-1 World MAX 2010 World Championship Tournament (-70 kg/154 lb) Championship
- Kombat League
  - KL World -66.7 kg/147 lb Muay Thai Championship (One time)
    - Three successful title defences
- Italian Muay Thai Association
  - MTA Italian Championship (One time)
  - MTA European -65 kg/143 lb Championship (One time)
    - One successful title defence
- World Kickboxing Network
  - 2009 WKN Intercontinental Welterweight (-69.9 kg/154 lb) Oriental Championship (One time)
    - One successful title defence
- World Muaythai Council
  - 2005 WMC Intercontinental Welterweight (-66.7 kg/147 lb) Championship (One time)

Awards

- LiverKick.com
  - 2012 Fighter of the Year
- BloodyElbow.com
  - 2011 Kickboxer of the Year

== Kickboxing record ==
Professional Kickboxing record
109 Wins (43 (T)KOs), 3 Losses, 2 Draws, 2 No Contest
Date	Result	Opponent	Event	Location	Method	Round	Time
2025-11-22	Win	(Portugal) Jose Sousa	PetrosyanMania - The Last Fight	Milan, Italy	Decision (Unanimous)	3	3:00
2025-05-24	Win	(France) Aymeric Lazizi	PetrosyanMania GOLD EDITION	Milan, Italy	Decision (Unanimous)	5	3:00
Defends the WAKO Pro K-1 World Super Welterweight (69.1kg) Championship.
2024-11-30	Win	(France) Nasser Boungab	PetrosyanMania GOLD EDITION	Monza, Italy	KO (Left cross)	1	
Defends the WAKO Pro K-1 World Super Welterweight (69.1kg) Championship.
2024-05-18	Win	(Spain) Sergio Sanchez	PetrosyanMania GOLD EDITION	Milan, Italy	Decision (Unanimous)	5	3:00
Wins the WAKO Pro K-1 World Super Welterweight (69.1kg) Championship.
2022-04-30	Win	(Turkey) Fatih Aydin	PetrosyanMania GOLD EDITION	Milan, Italy	TKO (Referee stoppage)	2	
2021-10-15	Loss	(Thailand) Superbon Banchamek	ONE Championship: First Strike	Kallang, Singapore	KO (Right High Kick)	2	0:20
For the inaugural ONE Kickboxing Featherweight Championship.
2021-02-26	Win	(Georgia (country)) Davit Kiria	ONE Championship: Fists Of Fury	Kallang, Singapore	Decision (Unanimous)	3	3:00
2020-02-01	Win	(France) Gaetan Dambo	Petrosyanmania: Gold Edition	Milan, Italy	Decision (Unanimous)	5	3:00
Retains ISKA Super Welterweight (-70 kg/154 lb) K-1 Rules World Championship.(2)
2019-10-13	Win	(France) Samy Sana	ONE Championship 100: Century	Tokyo, Japan	Decision (Unanimous)	3	3:00
Kickboxing Featherweight Grand-Prix Finals – Wins ONE Kickboxing Featherweight World Grand Prix Title.
2019-08-16	Win	(Thailand) Jo Nattawut	ONE Championship 98: Dreams of Gold, Featherweight Grand-Prix Semi-Finals	Bangkok, Thailand	KO (Punch)	1	2:44
2019-07-12	Win	(Thailand) Phetmorakot Petchyindee Academy	ONE Championship 96: Masters of Destiny, Featherweight Grand-Prix Quarter-Finals	Kuala Lumpur, Malaysia	Decision (Unanimous)	3	3:00
2019-05-17	NC	(Thailand) Phetmorakot Petchyindee Academy	ONE Championship 94: Enter the Dragon	Kallang, Singapore	No contest	3	3:00
Originally a split decision loss overturned due to illegal clinching.
2019-02-16	Win	(Japan) Atsushi Tamefusa	Petrosyan Mania	Italy	TKO (Referee Stoppage/Hooks)	1	2:40
Retains ISKA Super Welterweight (-70 kg/154 lb) K-1 Rules World Championship.(1)
2018-11-09	Win	(Thailand) Sorgraw Petchyindee	ONE Championship 81: Heart of the Lion	Kallang, Singapore	Decision (Unanimous)	3	3:00
2018-07-14	Win	(Belarus) Chingiz Allazov	Bellator Kickboxing 10	Rome, Italy	Decision (Unanimous)	5	3:00
2018-04-20	Win	(Thailand) Jo Nattawut	ONE Championship 69: Heroes of Honor	Manila, Philippines	Decision (Unanimous)	3	3:00
2017-10-14	Win	(Democratic Republic of the Congo) Chris Ngimbi	Petrosyan Mania	Monza, Italy	Decision (unanimous)	5	3:00
Wins the vacant ISKA Super Welterweight (-70 kg/154 lb) K-1 Rules World Championship.
2017-04-08	Win	(Romania) Amansio Paraschiv	Bellator Kickboxing 5 at Bellator 176	Turin, Italy	Decision (unanimous)	3	3:00
2017-02-18	Win	(Russia) Artem Pashporin	W5 Grand Prix KITEK XXXIX	Moscow, Russia	Decision (unanimous)	5	3:00
Wins the W5 World Championship Title (-71 kg).
2016-12-10	Win	(England) Jordan Watson	Bellator Kickboxing 4 at Bellator 168	Florence, Italy	TKO (Referee Stoppage)	3	0:52
2016-04-16	Win	(Brazil) Ravy Brunow	Oktagon 2016: Turin	Turin, Italy	Decision (unanimous)	3	3:00
2016-01-23	Win	(China) Jiao Fukai	Wu Lin Feng 2016: World Kickboxing Championship in Shanghai	Shanghai, China	TKO (Towel Throw)	3	3:00
2015-11-06	Win	(Canada) Josh Jauncey	Glory 25: Milan	Monza, Italy	Decision (unanimous)	3	3:00
2015-08-28	Win	(China) Xu Yan	Hero Legends	Dunhuang, China	KO (left knee to the body)	3	1:17
Wins the Hero Legends -70kg Championship.
2015-04-11	Win	(Germany) Enriko Kehl	Oktagon 2015: 20 Years Edition	Milan, Italy	Decision (majority)	3	3:00
2015-01-24	Win	(Turkey) Erkan Varol	Thai Boxe Mania 2015	Turin, Italy	Decision (unanimous)	3	3:00
2013-11-23	Loss	(Suriname) Andy Ristie	Glory 12: New York - Lightweight World Championship Tournament, Semi Finals	New York City, United States	KO (left uppercut)	3	0:43
2013-04-20	Win	(Morocco) Hafid El Boustati	Glory 7: Milan	Milan, Italy	Decision (unanimous)	3	3:00
2013-03-02	Win	(Denmark) Ole Laursen	Gotti Promotions	Trieste, Italy	KO (left high kick)	1	1:13
2012-11-03	Win	(Netherlands) Robin van Roosmalen	Glory 3: Rome - 70 kg Slam Tournament, Final	Rome, Italy	Decision (unanimous)	3	3:00
Wins the Glory 70kg Slam Tournament.
2012-11-03	Win	(Georgia (country)) Davit Kiria	Glory 3: Rome - 70 kg Slam Tournament, Semi Finals	Rome, Italy	Decision (unanimous)	3	3:00
2012-11-03	Win	(United States) Ky Hollenbeck	Glory 3: Rome - 70 kg Slam Tournament, Quarter Finals	Rome, Italy	TKO (knee injury)	2	0:34
2012-05-26	Win	(France) Fabio Pinca	Glory 1: Stockholm - 70 kg Slam Tournament, First Round	Stockholm, Sweden	Decision (unanimous)	3	3:00
2012-03-24	Win	(Ukraine) Artur Kyshenko	Oktagon 2012	Milan, Italy	Decision (unanimous)	3	3:00
2012-01-21	Win	(Spain) Abraham Roqueñi	Yokkao Extreme 2012	Milan, Italy	Decision (unanimous)	3	3:00
2011-11-12	Win	(Spain) Zeben Díaz	It's Showtime 53	Tenerife, Spain	Decision (split)	3	3:00
2011-07-18	Win	(Japan) Hinata	REBELS 8 & It's Showtime Japan Countdown-1	Tokyo, Japan	Decision (unanimous)	3	3:00
2011-05-14	NC	(Morocco) Chahid Oulad El Hadj	It's Showtime 2011 Lyon	Lyon, France	No contest (Low Blow)	3	1:05
2011-03-12	Win	(Brazil) Cosmo Alexandre	Fight Code: Dragon Series 2011 - Round 2	Milan, Italy	Decision (unanimous)	3	3:00
2011-01-29	Win	(Thailand) Sudsakorn Sor Klinmee	Thai Boxe Mania 2011	Turin, Italy	Decision (unanimous)	3	3:00
2010-11-08	Win	(Japan) Yoshihiro Sato	K-1 World MAX 2010 World Championship Tournament Final, Final	Tokyo, Japan	Decision (unanimous)	3	3:00
Wins the K-1 World MAX 2010 World Championship Tournament (-70 kg/154 lb) Championship.
2010-11-08	Win	(Greece) Mike Zambidis	K-1 World MAX 2010 World Championship Tournament Final, Semi Finals	Tokyo, Japan	Decision (unanimous)	3	3:00
2010-11-08	Win	(Netherlands) Albert Kraus	K-1 World MAX 2010 World Championship Tournament Final, Quarter Finals	Tokyo, Japan	Decision (unanimous)	3	3:00
2010-10-03	Win	(Belarus) Vitaly Gurkov	K-1 World MAX 2010 in Seoul World Championship Tournament Final 16, First Round	Seoul, South Korea	Decision (unanimous)	3	3:00
2010-03-13	Win	(Thailand) Kem Sitsongpeenong	Oktagon presents: It's Showtime 2010	Milan, Italy	Decision (unanimous)	3	3:00
2010-01-30	Win	(France) Mohamed Diaby	Campionato Mondiale Thai Boxe	Turin, Italy	TKO (corner stoppage)	2	2:35
Retains the WKN Intercontinental Welterweight (-69.9 kg/154 lb) Oriental Championship.
2009-10-26	Win	(Netherlands) Andy Souwer	K-1 World MAX 2009 World Championship Tournament Final, Final	Yokohama, Japan	Decision (unanimous)	3	3:00
Wins the K-1 World MAX 2009 World Championship Tournament (-70 kg/154 lb) Championship.
2009-10-26	Win	(Japan) Yuya Yamamoto	K-1 World MAX 2009 World Championship Tournament Final, Semi Finals	Yokohama, Japan	KO (right hook)	1	2:09
2009-07-13	Win	(Netherlands) Albert Kraus	K-1 World MAX 2009 World Championship Tournament Final 8, Quarter Finals	Tokyo, Japan	Decision (unanimous)	3	3:00
2009-05-16	Win	(Morocco) Faldir Chahbari	It's Showtime 2009 Amsterdam	Amsterdam, Netherlands	Decision (unanimous)	3	3:00
2009-04-21	Win	(Russia) Dzhabar Askerov	K-1 World MAX 2009 World Championship Tournament Final 16, First Round	Fukuoka, Japan	KO (left knee to the body)	3	0:49
2009-03-14	Win	(Netherlands) Andy Souwer	Oktagon presents: It's Showtime 2009	Milan, Italy	Extension round decision (unanimous)	4	3:00
2009-01-31	Win	(Georgia (country)) David Javakhia	Campionato Mondiale Thai Boxe	Turin, Italy	KO (left body kick)	1	1:44
Wins the WKN Intercontinental Welterweight (-69.9 kg/154 lb) Oriental Championship.
2008-11-29	Win	(South Africa) Warren Stevelmans	It's Showtime 2008 Eindhoven	Eindhoven, Netherlands	Decision (unanimous)	3	3:00
2008-11-08	Win	(Thailand) Naruepol Fairtex	Janus Fight Night: The Legend	Padua, Italy	Decision (unanimous)	5	3:00
2008-06-28	Win	(France) Rafik Bakkouri	Thai Boxe Abano GP 2008	Abano Terme, Italy	KO (right hook)	1	2:17
2008-05-24	Win	(Germany) Çağrı Ermiş	Gentleman Promotions Fightnight	Tilburg, Netherlands	Decision (unanimous)	5	3:00
2008-04-26	Win	(Democratic Republic of the Congo) Chris Ngimbi	K-1 World Grand Prix 2008 in Amsterdam	Amsterdam, Netherlands	Decision (unanimous)	3	3:00
2008-04-12	Win	(Albania) Mikel Colaj	K-1 Italy Oktagon 2008	Milan, Italy	TKO (referee stoppage)	5	1:55
2008-03-15	Win	(Portugal) Luís Reis	Balans: It's Showtime 75MAX Trophy Final 2008	's-Hertogenbosch, Netherlands	Decision (unanimous)	3	3:00
2007-11-24	Win	(Suriname) Marco Piqué	Janus Fight Night 2007, Final	Padua, Italy	Decision (unanimous)	3	3:00
Wins the Janus Fight Night 2007 -72 kg/158 lb Tournament Championship.
2007-11-24	Win	(Cameroon) Abdallah Mabel	Janus Fight Night 2007, Semi Finals	Padua, Italy	Decision (unanimous)	3	3:00
2007-11-24	Win	(Portugal) José Reis	Janus Fight Night 2007, Quarter Finals	Padua, Italy	Decision (unanimous)	3	3:00
2007-10-13	Win	(Morocco) Behrouz Rastagar	Battle of Arnhem 6	Arnhem, Netherlands	KO	1	
2007-07-27	Win	(Cameroon) Abdallah Mabel	Serata Muaythai Gala	Trieste, Italy	TKO (left cross)	5	1:50
2007-05-26	Win	(Cameroon) Abdallah Mabel	Muay Thai Event in Padova	Padua, Italy	Decision (unanimous)	3	3:00
2007-05-19	Draw	(Thailand) Buakaw Por. Pramuk	K-1 Fighting Network Scandinavian Qualification 2007	Stockholm, Sweden	Draw (split)	5	3:00
For the WMC World Junior Middleweight (-69.8 kg/154 lb) Championship.
2007-04-14	Win	(Russia) Arslan Magomedov	K-1 Italy Oktagon 2007	Milan, Italy	Decision (unanimous)	5	3:00
2007-03-17	Win	(Cameroon) Sadio Cissoko	King of Kings	Milan, Italy	TKO (left hook)	3	
2007-01-23	Loss	(Thailand) Nonthanan Por.Pramuk	Por. Pramuk Fights, Lumpinee Stadium	Bangkok, Thailand	Decision (unanimous)	5	3:00
2006-12-02	Win	(Suriname) Marco Piqué	Janus Fight Night 2006, Final	Padua, Italy	Decision (unanimous)	3	3:00
Wins the Janus Fight Night 2006 -72 kg/158 lb Tournament Championship.
2006-12-02	Win	(Croatia) Frane Radnić	Janus Fight Night 2006, Semi Finals	Padua, Italy	TKO (left cross to the body)	1	2:32
2006-12-02	Win	(France) Cédric Muller	Janus Fight Night 2006, Quarter Finals	Padua, Italy	Decision (unanimous)	3	3:00
2006-11-19	Win	(Suriname) Imro Main	Rings Kickboxing Gala	Enschede, Netherlands	Decision (unanimous)	5	3:00
Retains the Kombat League World -66.7 kg/147 lb Muay Thai Championship.
2006-09-12	Win	(England) Frankie Hudders	Kombat League	Pordenone, Italy	KO	2	
Retains the Kombat League World -66.7 kg/147 lb Muay Thai Championship.
2006-08-05	Win	(France) Johnny Tancray	The Night of Superfights	Sardinia, Italy	TKO	4	
Retains the Kombat League World -66.7 kg/147 lb Muay Thai Championship.
2006-06-10	Win	(Netherlands) Benito Caupain	S-1 Muay Thai Middle Europe Tournament	Nova Gorica, Slovenia	KO (left high kick)	1	2:46
Wins the Kombat League World -66.7 kg/147 lb Muay Thai Championship.
2006-04-01	Win	(Netherlands) Roel Rink	Italian Extreme IV, Final	Modena, Italy	TKO (left low kick)	1	1:11
Wins the Italian Extreme IV Tournament Championship.
2006-04-01	Win	(England) Richard Barnhill	Italian Extreme IV, Semi Finals	Modena, Italy	KO (left low kick)	1	1:45
2006-02-00	Win	(Thailand) Petch	Phetch Buncha Samui Stadium	Ko Samui, Thailand	KO (left low kick)	3	0:13
2006-01-14	Win	(France) Mohamed Bourkhis	The Night of Superfights III	Villebon, France	Decision (unanimous)	5	3:00
2005-10-22	Win	(France) Tarik Benfkih	The Night of Superfights II	Villebon, France	TKO (left low kick)	2	
2005-06-25	Win	(France) Olivier Tchétché		Nova Gorica, Slovenia	TKO (referee stoppage)	2	
Wins the WMC Intercontinental Welterweight (-66.7 kg/147 lb) Championship.
2005-04-30	Win	(France) Gaetan Ferre	Muaythai Mondiale a Trieste	Trieste, Italy	KO (left elbow)	4	
2005-04-10	Draw	Thailand Pinsinchai	Bologna Fight Night	Bologna, Italy	Decision	5	3:00
2005-02-00	Win	(Albania) Shemsi Beqiri	Gotti Promotions	Gorizia, Italy	Decision	5	
Retains the MTA European -65 kg/143 lb Championship.
2004-07-17	Win	(France) Anis Kabouri	France vs. Italy	Italy	TKO	2	
2004-00-00	Win	(France) Fabio Pinca			Decision	5	3:00
Wins the MTA European -65 kg/143 lb Championship.
2004-00-00	Win	(Thailand) Tavenlek	Thailand vs. Europe	Trieste, Italy	Decision (unanimous)	5	3:00
2004-00-00	Win	(Thailand) Supan		Trieste, Italy	KO	2	
2003-11-09	Win	(Italy) Gionata Zarbo	Thaiboxing in Trieste	Trieste, Italy	KO	3	
Wins the MTA Italian Championship.
2003-06-00	Win	(Italy) Patrik Carta	Thaiboxing Gala in Mestre	Mestre, Italy	KO	1	
2003-04-00	Win	(Italy) Riccardo Cumani	La Bangkok Italiana	Trieste, Italy	Decision	5	2:00
2003-00-00	Win	(France) Mickaël Lallemand			TKO	2	
Legend: Win Loss Draw/No contest Notes

== See also ==
- List of male kickboxers
- List of K-1 events
