= K-1 World MAX 2009 World Championship Tournament final =

K-1 kickboxing events in 2009

K-1 World MAX 2009 World Championship Tournament Final
- Promotion: K-1
- Date: October 26, 2009
- Venue: Yokuhama Arena
- City: Yokohama, Japan
- Attendance: 11,231

Event chronology
K-1 ColliZion 2009 Final Elimination	K-1 World MAX 2009 World Championship Tournament Final	K-1 Rumble of the Kings 2009 in Stockholm

K-1 World MAX 2009 World Championship Tournament - Final - was a martial arts event promoted by the K-1 organization. It took place on Monday, October 26, 2009 at the Yokohama Arena in Yokohama, Japan. It was the 8th annual K-1 World Max (70 kg/154 lbs weight class) World Championship Final, featuring four quarter final winners of K-1 World MAX 2009 Final 8 held on July 13, 2009 in Tokyo, Japan. It was broadcast in North America on October 31 by HDNet.

== K-1 MAX World Grand Prix 2009 Final bracket ==
Final 16
(Japan) Yoshihiro Sato	4r.
(Armenia) Gago Drago	Dec
(Japan) Yuya Yamamoto	DEC
(South Korea) Chi Bin Lim	3r.
(Italy) Giorgio Petrosyan	KO
(United Arab Emirates) Dzhabar Askerov	3r.
(Netherlands) Albert Kraus	KO
(Japan) Yuichiro Nagashima	1r.
(Ukraine) Artur Kyshenko	KO
(Cape Verde) Alviar Lima	1r.
(Netherlands) Andy Souwer	DEC
(Netherlands) Leroy Kaestner	3r.
(Netherlands) Nieky Holzken	DEC
(Morocco) Chaid Oulad El Hadj	3r.
(Thailand) Buakaw Por.Pramuk	DEC
(Brazil) Andre Dida	4r.

Final 8
(Armenia) Gago Drago	3r.
(Japan) Yuya Yamamoto	DEC
(Italy) Giorgio Petrosyan	DEC
(Netherlands) Albert Kraus	3r.
(Ukraine) Artur Kyshenko	4r.
(Netherlands) Andy Souwer	DEC
(Netherlands) Nieky Holzken	3r.
(Thailand) Buakaw Por.Pramuk	DEC

Semi Finals
(Japan) Yuya Yamamoto	1r.
(Italy) Giorgio Petrosyan	KO
(Netherlands) Andy Souwer	DEC
(Thailand) Buakaw Por.Pramuk	4r.

Final
(Italy) Giorgio Petrosyan	DEC
(Netherlands) Andy Souwer	3r.

== Results ==
K-1 World MAX 2009 World Championship Tournament Final
Opening fights K-1 Koshien Final 8: K-1 Koshien Rules / 2Min. 3R/62 kg
(Japan) Masaaki Noiri def. Keisuke Miyamoto (Japan)
Noiri defeated Miyamoto by three round unanimous decision (3-0).
(Japan) Shota Shimada def. Hiroki Akimoto (Japan)
Shimada defeated Akimoto by three round unanimous decision (3-0).
(Japan) Katsuki Ishida def. Tsukasa Fuji (Japan)
Ishida defeated Fuji by three round unanimous decision (3-0).
(Japan) Hiroya def. Ryuya Kusakabe (Japan)
Hiroya defeated Kusakabe by three round split decision (2-1).
Super fight: K-1 Rules / 3Min. 3R Ext. 1R
(China) Xu Yan def. Yuichiro Nagashima (Japan)
Yan defeated Nagashima by KO (left hook) at 1:04 of the first round.
K-1 World MAX 2009 Final 4: K-1 Rules / 3Min. 3R Ext. 1R
(Italy) Giorgio Petrosyan vs. Yuya Yamamoto (Japan)
Petrosyan defeated Yamamoto by KO (right hook) at 2:09 of the first round.
(Netherlands) Andy Souwer def. Buakaw Por. Pramuk (Thailand)
Souwer defeated Por Pramuk by extra round split decision 2–1 (10-9, 9-10, 10-9). After three rounds, judges scored it a unanimous draw 0-0 (30-30, 30-30, 29-29).
Reserve fight: K-1 Rules / 3Min. 3R Ext. 1R
(Japan) Yoshihiro Sato def. Yasuhiro Kido (Japan)
Sato defeated Kido by KO (right hook) at 2:23 of the second round.
Super fights: K-1 Rules / 3Min. 3R Ext. 1R
(South Korea) Jae Hee Cheon def. Kazuhisa Watanabe (Japan)
Cheon defeated Watanabe by three round split decision (2-1).
(Netherlands) Albert Kraus def. Kozo Takeda (Japan)
Kraus defeated Takeda by TKO (referee stoppage) at 2:19 of the second round.
(Armenia) Gago Drago def. Taishin Kohiruimaki (Japan)
Drago defeated Kohiruimaki by three round unanimous decision (3-0).
(Ukraine) Artur Kyshenko def. Toofan Salafzoon (Iran)
Kyshenko defeated Salafzoon by KO (straight right) at 1:50 of the third round.
(Japan) Hinata Watanabe vs. Mike Zambidis (Greece)
Watanabe defeated Zambidis by three round unanimous decision (3-0).
K-1 World MAX 2009 Final: K-1 Rules / 3Min. 3R Ext. 1R
(Italy) Giorgio Petrosyan def. Andy Souwer (Netherlands)
Petrosyan defeated Souwer by three round unanimous decision (3-0).

== See also ==
- List of K-1 events
- List of K-1 champions
- List of male kickboxers
