= Mike Zambidis =

Greek kickboxer

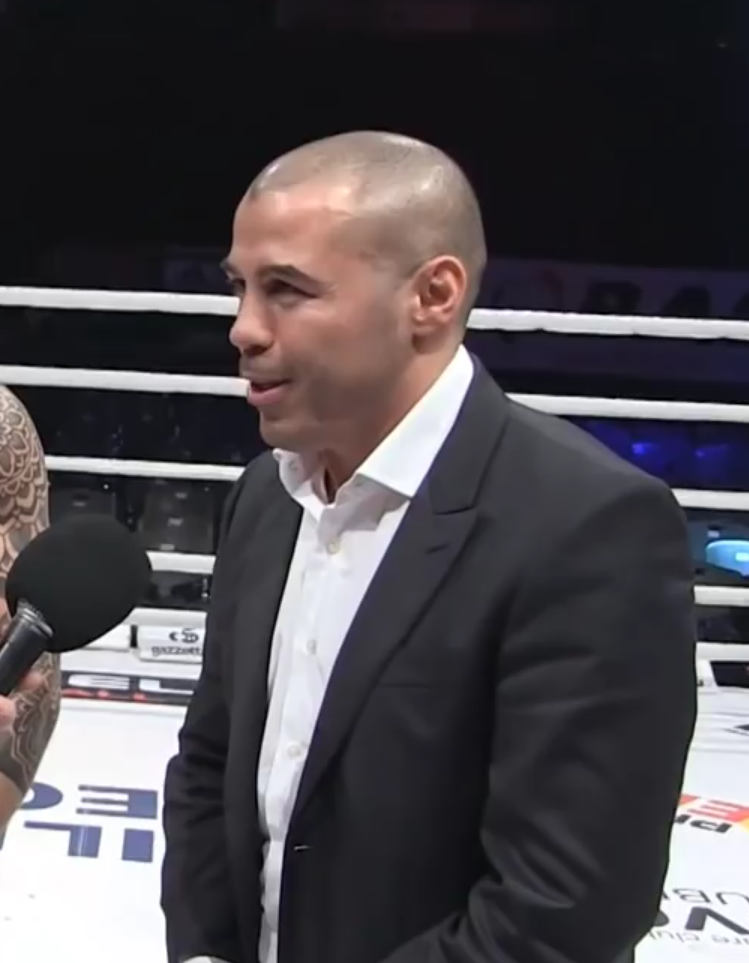
- Born: Michális Zambídis; 15 July 1980 (age 46); Porto Rafti, Athens, Greece
- Native name: Μιχάλης Ζαμπίδης
- Other names: Iron Mike, Turkofagos (Turkeater)
- Height: 1.67 m (5 ft 5 1/2 in)
- Weight: 70 kg (154 lb; 11 st 0 lb)
- Division: Welterweight; Middleweight
- Style: K-1, Kickboxing
- Team: Zambidis Club
- Trainer: Kru Mario Barbatsas
- Years active: 2000–2015

Kickboxing record
- Total: 181
- Wins: 157
- By knockout: 87
- Losses: 24
- By knockout: 7

Other information
- Website: www.ironmikezambidis.com
- Last updated on: 28 June 2015

Michalis "Iron Mike" Zambidis (Greek: Μιχάλης Ζαμπίδης; born 15 July 1980) is a professional Greek kickboxer and martial artist. He is an 18-time Champion, including former World version W5, SUPERKOMBAT and fought in a series of K-1 Tournaments and Grand Prix. He mostly competed in the K-1 MAX where he scored mostly knockouts.

He's considered a very notable kickboxer and was a fighter who fought in top competitions.

== Biography and career ==
Mike Zambidis started training in martial arts before he was nine years old with his brother Spiros Zambidis and his best friend Lazaros Filipas. He has trained in Shotokan Karate, Boxing, Kickboxing, Muay Thai, Sanda and Pankration. He started competing professionally in 2000, scoring a string of victories over notable opponents. He was given the nickname Turkofagos (Turkeater) after his 11th win over Turkish fighters due to the fact that he never lost to a Turk. He has been technically knocked out twice himself early in his career due to cuts, but after 2002, his next technical knock-out defeat came in 2008 against Andy Souwer in an extra round.

From 2000 till 2002, Zambidis defeated notable kickboxer Jenk Behic twice, Gürkan Özkan twice who outweighed Mike by over 50 lbs in two rare open-weight fights, Kara Murat twice, Baris Nezif, Wanlop Sosathopan, Bakari Tounkara, Matteo Sciacca and Petr Polak. In 2002, he knocked out the strong and experienced Dutch-Moroccan Hassan Kassrioui. On 26 November 2002 he won the K-1 Oceania MAX 2002 title after defeating John Wayne Parr in the final.

In 2003, promoter Tarik Solak arranged Zambidis' debut fight in Japan against 2002 World K-1 Max Champion Albert Kraus, whom he knocked out in the 2nd round. In April 2005, Zambidis knocked out the popular Norifumi "Kid" Yamamoto with a right hook, in front of thousands of the Japanese kickboxer's fans. Zambidis' weakness seems to be receiving low kicks, as was seen in his 2006 defeat by Japanese Yoshihiro Sato, who, despite getting hurt by Zambidis' punches, managed to land many kicks and knees which racked up enough points to "secure a unanimous decision." Zambidis is a 4 time national champion in kickboxing as well as holding a large number of international titles. In addition to his many outstanding fights, the K-1 World MAX 2010 Final 16 match on October the 3rd, 2010 against Chahid Oulad El Hadj was notable as being one of the most exciting of his career. In addition, as stated by ring side commentators "Sugar" Ray Sefo and Michael Schiavello, this contest was one by which a standard was set for other K-1 fights. However, Zambidis did not make it to the final as he lost to Giorgio Petrosyan by unanimous decision. Zambidis knocked down Petrosyan in the fight, but it was controversially ruled a slip by the referee.

Zambidis fought a rubber match (both having won 1 match apiece) with Australian Muay Thai champion John Wayne Parr in May 2011. He lost by TKO (three knockdowns) in round 1.

He defeated Reece McAllister by unanimous decision in the quarter-finals of the K-1 World MAX 2012 World Championship Tournament Final in Athens, Greece on 15 December 2012. He then lost to the eventual champion Murthel Groenhart in the semis. The much larger Groenhart won the fight with knees and punches, forcing his corner to stop the fight at the end of round two.

He was expected to compete in a four-man tournament in Russia on 25 May 2013, facing Dzhabar Askerov in the semi-finals. However, he was replaced by Enriko Gogokhia.

Zambidis beat Harun Kina by unanimous decision for the vacant SUPERKOMBAT Middleweight Championship at SUPERKOMBAT VIP Edition in Bucharest, Romania on 31 August 2013.

He was scheduled to fight Elam Ngor at the K-1 World MAX 2013 World Championship Tournament Final 16 in Majorca, Spain on 14 September 2013. However, he withdrew from the tournament and was replaced by Ismat Aghazade.

He lost to Xu Yan by unanimous decision, suffering controversial knockdowns in rounds one and two as he received below blows in both occasions, at Hero Legends in Jinan, China on 3 January 2014.

Zambidis and Batu Khasikov had a rematch fight and challenge the WKN Heavyweight Kickboxing World Championship at Fight Night: Battle of Moscow XV event in Moscow, Russia on 28 March 2014. The Russian Batu Khasikov won the battle again for the second time.

He won his first defence of his SUPERKOMBAT middleweight title against Harun Kina on 17 January at Iron Challenge 2015 from Athens, Greece.

In May 2015 he announced he would retire after his final fight in June against Steve Moxon, in his home country of Greece. This happened on 5 June 2015.

In October 2017, he participated in the reality game Nomads.

In March 2019, returned to active action after 3.5 years off abstention for a professional boxing match vs Venezuelan Antonio Gomez. Although Zambidis sustained an injury during the 1st round that forced him to fight with only one hand, he was victorious after a gruelling fight.

Zambidis was scheduled to box Floyd Mayweather in a boxing exhibition bout which was set to take place on June 27, 2026. The fight got cancelled two days before the scheduled bout.

== Titles ==
- 2019 BREAKOUT. Champion
- 2015 World W.K.U. Champion
- 2015 W.I.P.U. "King of the Ring" Oriental Rules Super Welterweight World Champion −71 kg (6th title defence)
- 2015 SUPERKOMBAT Middleweight Championship -71 kg/156.5lb (2nd title defence)
- 2013 SUPERKOMBAT Middleweight Championship -71 kg/156.5lb (One time)
- 2012 K-1 World MAX 3rd Place
- 2012 W.I.P.U. "King of the Ring" Oriental Rules Super Welterweight World Champion -71 kg (5th title defence)
- 2011 W5 World Grand Prix KO World Champion -71 kg
- 2011 W.I.P.U. "King of the Ring" Oriental Rules Super Welterweight World Champion -70 kg (4th title defence)
- 2010 K-1 World MAX 3rd Place
- 2009 World PROFI World Champion (1st title defence)
- 2008 W.I.P.U. "King of the Ring" Oriental Rules Super Welterweight World Champion -70 kg (3rd title defence)
- 2008 A-1 Combat Cup Super Welterweight World Champion
- 2006 W.I.P.U. "King of the Ring" Oriental Rules Super Welterweight World Champion -70 kg (2nd title defence)
- 2005 World PROFI World Champion
- 2005 W.K.B.F. Super Welterweight World Champion
- 2005 W.I.P.U. "King of the Ring" Oriental Rules Super Welterweight World Champion -70 kg (1st title defence)
- 2004 A-1 World Combat Cup Champion -76 kg
- 2003 W.I.P.U. "King of the Ring" Oriental Rules Super Welterweight World Champion -70 kg
- 2002 W.O.K.A Super Welterweight World Champion (4th title defence)
- 2002 K-1 World Max Oceania Champion
- 2002 W.I.P.U. "King of the Ring" Thai Boxing Tournament Champion
- 2001 W.O.K.A Super Welterweight World Champion (3 title defences that year)
- 2000 W.O.K.A Super Welterweight World Champion
- 1998 World PROFI Europe Champion
- 1997 I.S.K.A. Balkan Champion
- 1996/1998/1999/2000 Greek Boxing Champion

== Kickboxing record ==
Kickboxing Record
157 Wins (87 (T)KOs), 24 Losses
Date	Result	Opponent	Event	Location	Method	Round	Time
2015-06-27	Win	(Australia) Steve Moxon	Iron Challenge	Athens, Greece,	Decision	5	3:00
2015-05-09	Win	(Turkey) Erkan Varol	Iron Challenge 2015	Limassol, Cyprus	Decision	5	3:00
2015-01-17	Win	(Turkey) Harun Kina	Iron Challenge 2015	Athens, Greece	KO (Right Kick/Left Hook)	5	
Defended the SUPERKOMBAT Middleweight Championship
2014-03-28	Loss	(Russia) Batu Khasikov	Fight Nights: Battle of Moscow 15	Moscow, Russia	Decision (Split)	5	3:00
For WKN Super Welterweight Oriental Rules World Championship -72.6 kg.
2014-01-03	Loss	(China) Xu Yan	Hero Legends	Jinan, China	Decision (Unanimous)	3	3:00
For the Hero Legends World Championship Title (-70 kg)
2013-08-31	Win	(Turkey) Harun Kina	SUPERKOMBAT VIP Edition	Bucharest, Romania	Decision (Unanimous)	3	3:00
Won the vacant SUPERKOMBAT Middleweight Championship
2012-12-15	Loss	(Netherlands) Murthel Groenhart	K-1 World MAX 2012 World Championship Tournament Final, Semi Finals	Athens, Greece	TKO (Doctor Stoppage, Cut)	2	3:00
2012-12-15	Win	(England) Reece McAllister	K-1 World MAX 2012 World Championship Tournament Final, Quarter Finals	Athens, Greece	Decision (Unanimous)	3	3:00
2012-05-27	Win	(Netherlands) Chahid Oulad El Hadj	K-1 World MAX 2012 World Championship Tournament Final 16, First Round	Madrid, Spain	KO (Left Hook)	3	1:34
Qualifies for K-1 World MAX 2012 Final.
2012-04-29	Win	(Syria) Fadi Merza	Iron Challenge	Athens, Greece	Decision (Unanimous)	3	3:00
2011-11-05	Loss	(Russia) Batu Khasikov	W5	Moscow, Russia	TKO (Doctor Stoppage)	1	1:51
Losses W5 World Title (-71 kg)
2011-10-01	Win	(Russia) Danila Utenkov	Kings of the Ring	Cyprus	Decision (Unanimous)	3	-
2011-05-27	Loss	(Australia) John Wayne Parr	Payback Time: "The Decider"	Melbourne, Australia	TKO (Referee Stoppage)	1	
2011-04-09	Win	(Russia) Dzhabar Askerov	W5 Grand Prix K.O, Final	Moscow, Russia	Decision (Unanimous)	3	3:00
Wins W5 World Grand Prix KO world title -71 kg
2011-04-09	Win	(Ukraine) Enriko Gogokhia	W5 Grand Prix K.O, Semi Final	Moscow, Russia	Ext R. Decision (Unanimous)	4	3:00
2011-03-12	Win	(Turkey) Ali Gunyar	Iron Challenge	Athens, Greece	Decision (Unanimous)	5	3:00
Retains W.I.P.U. "King of the Ring" Oriental Rules Super Welterweight World title.
2010-11-08	Loss	(Italy) Giorgio Petrosyan	K-1 World MAX 2010 Final Semi-final	Tokyo, Japan	Decision (Unanimous)	3	3:00
2010-11-08	Win	(Japan) Yuichiro Nagashima	K-1 World MAX 2010 Final Quarter-final	Tokyo, Japan	TKO (Referee Stoppage)	3	0:53
2010-10-03	Win	(Netherlands) Chahid Oulad El Hadj	K-1 World MAX 2010 Final 16 - Part 2	Seoul, South Korea	Ext.R Decision (Unanimous)	4	3:00
Qualifies for K-1 World MAX 2010 Final.
2010-03-20	Win	(South Africa) Warren Stevelmans	Kickboxing Superstar XIX	Milan, Italy	Decision (Unanimous)	3	3:00
2009-11-20	Win	(Russia) Dzhabar Askerov	War of the Worlds	Brunswick, Australia	Decision (Majority)	5	3:00
2009-10-26	Loss	(Japan) Hinata Watanabe	K-1 World MAX 2009 World Championship Super Fight	Yokohama, Japan	Decision (Unanimous)	3	3:00
2009-05-07	Loss	(Australia) John Wayne Parr	Payback Time	Melbourne, Australia	Decision (Unanimous)	5	3:00
2009-01-31	Win	(Denmark) Rhassan Muhareb	Athletic Club "Minoas"	Heraklion, Crete, Greece	Decision (Unanimous)	3	3:00
Retains World PROFI World title.
2008-07-07	Loss	(Netherlands) Albert Kraus	K-1 World MAX 2008 World Championship Final 8 Super Fight	Tokyo, Japan	TKO (Doctor Stoppage)	3	3:00
2008-06-23	Win	(Croatia) Sanel Muslic	Iron Challenge	Athens, Greece	TKO (Referee Stoppage)	3	2:00
Retains W.I.P.U. "King of the Ring" Oriental Rules Super Welterweight World title.
2008-04-09	Loss	(Netherlands) Andy Souwer	K-1 World MAX 2008 World Championship Final 16	Hiroshima, Japan	Ext.R KO (Left High Kick)	4	2:05
Fails to qualify for K-1 World MAX 2008 World Championship although he will be invited to take part in a Super Fight.
2008-03-03	Win	(Australia) Daniel Dawson	No Respect 4	Melbourne, Australia	Decision (Split)	5	3:00
Wins A-1 World Combat Cup Super Welterweight World title.
2007-12-09	Win	(Spain) Bernardo Marban De La Horra	Urban Fighters	Athens, Greece	KO (Right Hooks)	3	1:05
2007-10-03	Loss	(Ukraine) Artur Kyshenko	K-1 World MAX 2007 World Championship Quarter Finals	Tokyo, Japan	Ext.R Decision (Unanimous)	4	3:00
2007-06-28	Win	(Armenia) Gago Drago	K-1 World MAX 2007 World Tournament Final Elimination	Tokyo, Japan	Ext.R Decision (Unanimous)	4	3:00
Qualifies for K-1 World MAX 2007 World Championship.
2007-04-04	Win	(Japan) Kozo Takeda	K-1 World MAX 2007 World Elite Showcase	Yokohama, Japan	Decision (Unanimous)	3	3:00
2006-09-04	Win	(Japan) Tatsuji	K-1 World MAX 2006 Champions Challenge	Tokyo, Japan	Decision (Unanimous)	3	3:00
2006-04-05	Loss	(Japan) Yoshihiro Sato	K-1 World MAX 2006 World Tournament Open	Tokyo, Japan	Decision (Split)	3	3:00
Fails to qualify for K-1 World MAX 2006 Championship.
2006-03-12	Win	(Czech Republic) Michal Hansgut	Great Kickboxing Spectacle in Greece	Thessaloniki, Greece	Decision (Unanimous)	3	3:00
Retains W.I.P.U. "King of the Ring" Oriental Rules Super Welterweight World title.
2006-02-04	Loss	(Thailand) Buakaw Por. Pramuk	K-1 World MAX 2006 Japan Tournament	Saitama, Japan	Decision (Unanimous)	3	3:00
2005-11-07	Win	(Turkey) Kara Murat	No Respect 3	Melbourne, Australia	Decision (Unanimous)	5	3:00
2005-10-12	Win	(Japan) Satoru Suzuki	K-1 World MAX 2005 Champions' Challenge	Tokyo, Japan	KO	2	1:17
2005-07-20	Loss	(Japan) Masato	K-1 World MAX 2005 Championship Quarter Finals	Yokohama, Japan	Decision (Unanimous)	3	3:00
2005-06-05	Win	(Turkey) Kara Murat	Professional Title Gala	Athens, Greece	Decision (Unanimous)	5	3:00
2005-05-04	Win	(Japan) Norifumi Yamamoto	K-1 World MAX 2005 World Tournament Open	Tokyo, Japan	KO (Right Hook)	3	0:39
Qualifies for K-1 World MAX 2005 Championship.
2005-03-12	Win	(Croatia) Goran Borović	Greece and Serbia Fight the World	Sydney, Australia	KO (Overhand Right)	5	
Retains W.I.P.U. "King of the Ring" Oriental Rules Super Welterweight World title and wins W.K.B.F. Super Welterweight world title.
2005-02-20	Win	(Papua New Guinea) Stanley Nandex	Kicker vs Boxer	Melbourne, Australia	KO	1	
2004-10-13	Win	(Japan) Kojiro	K-1 World MAX 2004 Champions' Challenge	Tokyo, Japan	KO (3 Knockdowns, Punches)	1	2:21
2004-11-28	Win	(Turkey) Gurkan Ozkan	A-1 World Combat Cup 2004, Final	Melbourne, Australia	Decision (Unanimous)	3	3:00
Wins A-1 World Combat Cup 2004 title -76 kg.
2004-11-28	Win	(Morocco) Hamid Boujaoub	A-1 World Combat Cup 2004, Semi Finals	Melbourne, Australia	Decision (Unanimous)	3	3:00
2004-11-28	Win	(United States) Pete Spratt	A-1 World Combat Cup 2004, Quarter Finals	Melbourne, Australia	TKO (Ref Stop/3 Knockdowns)	2	
2004-04-07	Loss	(Japan) Takayuki Kohiruimaki	K-1 World MAX 2004 World Tournament Quarter Finals	Tokyo, Japan	Decision (Unanimous)	3	3:00
2004-04-07	Win	(Japan) Hayato	K-1 World MAX 2004 World Tournament Open	Tokyo, Japan	Decision (Unanimous)	3	3:00
Qualifies for K-1 World MAX 2004 World Tournament.
2003-11-30	Win	(Turkey) Gurkan Ozkan	No Respect 2	Melbourne, Australia	KO (Overhand Right)	12	
2003-07-05	Loss	(Japan) Masato	K-1 World MAX 2003 World Tournament Quarter Finals	Saitama, Japan	Decision (Split)	3	3:00
2003-05-17	Win	(Thailand) Wanlop SitPholek	Kickboxing Superstar XII	Milan, Italy	Decision	5	3:00
Wins W.I.P.U. "King of the Ring" Oriental Rules Super Welterweight World title.
2003-03-01	Win	(Netherlands) Albert Kraus	K-1 World MAX 2003 Japan Grand Prix	Tokyo, Japan	KO (Right Hook)	2	0:16
2003-02-18	Win	(Finland) Niklas Winberg	K-1 No Respect 2003	Melbourne, Australia	KO	3	1:12
2002-12-08	Win	(Turkey) Jenk Behic	W.O.K.A. Super Welterweight World Title Fight	Melbourne, Australia	KO	6	1:46
Retains W.O.K.A. Super Welterweight World title.
2002-11-26	Win	(Australia) John Wayne Parr	K-1 Oceania MAX 2002 Final	Melbourne, Australia	Decision	3	3:00
Wins K-1 Oceania MAX 2002 title.
2002-11-26	Win	(Turkey) Jenk Behic	K-1 Oceania MAX 2002 Semi Finals	Melbourne, Australia	TKO (Referee Stoppage)	5	2:48
2002-11-26	Win	(Papua New Guinea) Billy Mamu	K-1 Oceania MAX 2002 Quarter Finals	Melbourne, Australia	TKO (Corner Stoppage)	2	
2002-11-03	Loss	(Netherlands) Youness El Mhassani	Tulp Thaiboks gala	Hoofddorp, Netherlands	Decision (Unanimous)	5	3:00
2002-10-05	Loss	(Netherlands) Noel Soares	Thaiboxing @ Topsportcentrum	Rotterdam, Netherlands	Decision (Unanimous)	5	3:00
2002-05-19	Win	(Netherlands) Hassan Kassrioui	Kickboxing Mania	Athens, Greece	KO (Punches)	6	
2002	Win	(Czech Republic) Petr Polak	"King Of The Ring" Italy Thai Boxing Tournament, Final	Italy	KO (Left Hook)	1	
Wins W.I.P.U. "King Of The Ring" 2002 Italy Thai Boxing Tournament title.
2002	Win	(Italy) Matteo Sciacca	"King Of The Ring" Italy Thai Boxing Tournament, Semi Finals	Italy	KO (Right Hook)	2	
2002	Win	(France) Bakari Tounkara	"King Of The Ring" Italy Thai Boxing Tournament, Quarter Finals	Italy	TKO (Referee Stoppage)	1	
2002-03-02	Loss	(France) Alain Zankifo	Le Grand Tournoi	Paris, France	TKO (Referee Stoppage, Cut)	3	
2001-11-11	Loss	(Australia) Mike Cope	K-1 Oceania MAX 2001 Quarter Finals	Melbourne, Australia	TKO (Corner Stoppage, Cut)	1	
2001-09-08	Win	(Australia) Shannon Forrester	W.O.K.A. Super Welterweight World Title Fight	Gold Coast, Australia	KO (Punches)	3	
Retains W.O.K.A. Super Welterweight World title.
2001-09-01	Win	(Australia) Paul Shearing	W.O.K.A. Super Welterweight World Title Fight	Sydney, Australia	KO	1	
Retains W.O.K.A. Super Welterweight World title.
2001-04-03	Win	(Thailand) Krongsak Lek	W.O.K.A. Super Welterweight World Title Fight	Melbourne, Australia	TKO (Referee Stoppage, Punches)	8	1:46
Retains W.O.K.A. Super Welterweight World title.
2000-11-19	Win	(Turkey) Baris Nezif	K-1 Oceania Star Wars 2000	Melbourne, Australia	KO (Punches)	12	1:46
Wins W.O.K.A. Super Welterweight World title.
Legend: Win Loss Draw/No contest Notes

== See also ==
- List of K-1 Events
- List of K-1 champions
- List of male kickboxers
