= Albert Kraus =

Dutch kickboxer

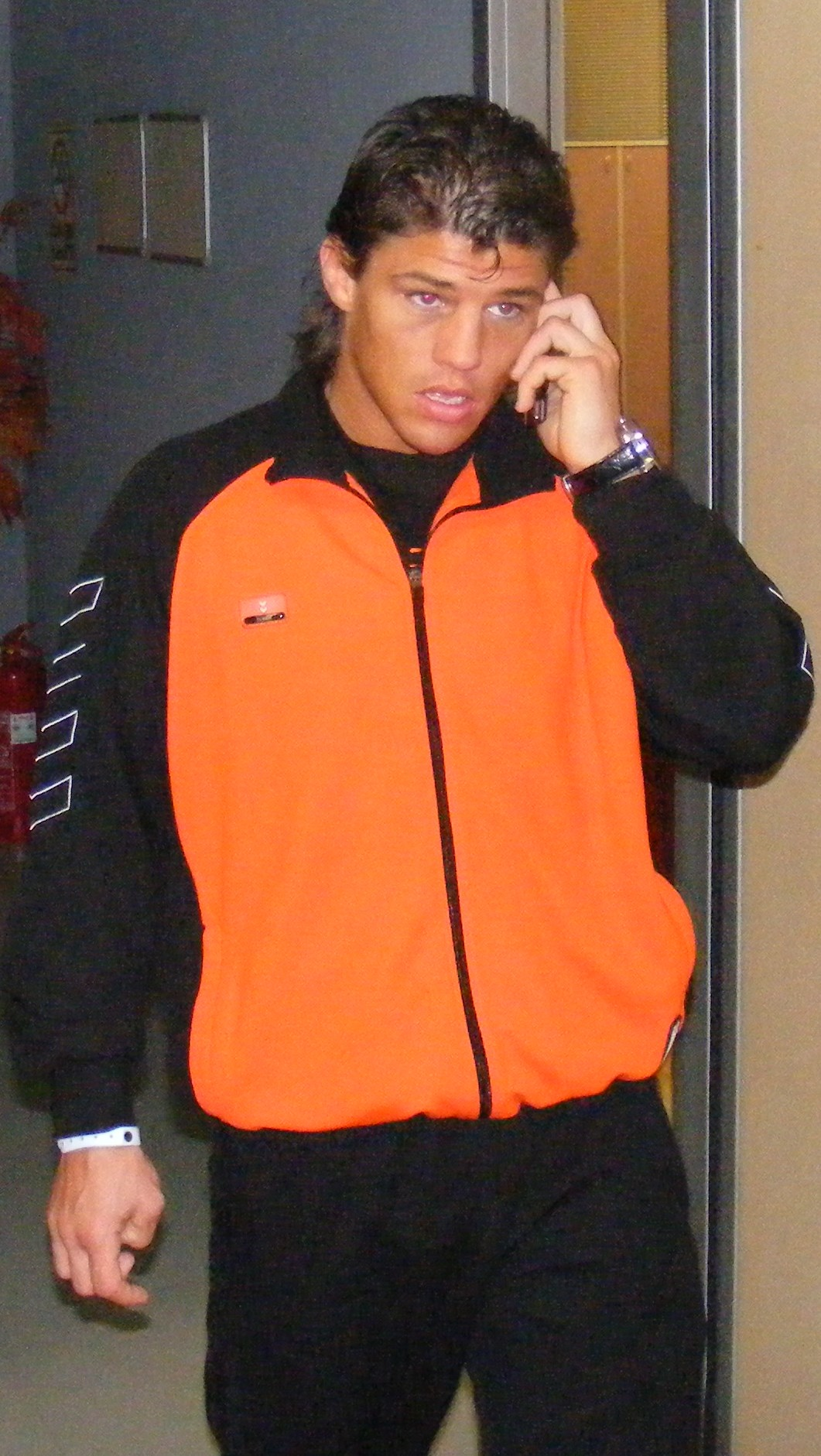
- Kraus at the backstage of K-1 Turkey in 2007
- Born: August 3, 1980 (age 46); Oss, Netherlands
- Other names: The Hurricane
- Height: 1.75 m (5 ft 9 in)
- Weight: 72.5 kg (160 lb; 11.42 st)
- Division: Welterweight; Middleweight
- Style: Boxing, Kickboxing
- Team: Super Pro Gym
- Trainer: Dennis Krauweel
- Years active: 1997–present

Professional boxing record
- Total: 7
- Wins: 7
- By knockout: 5
- Losses: 0
- Draws: 0

Kickboxing record
- Total: 148
- Wins: 115
- By knockout: 79
- Losses: 30
- By knockout: 4
- Draws: 3

Other information
- Children: Son Gradus Kraus
- Website: http://www.albert-kraus.com
- Last updated on: November 20, 2017

Albert “The Hurricane” Kraus (born August 3, 1980) is a Dutch kickboxer. He was the first K-1 World MAX Tournament Champion in 2002 and also the first SUPERKOMBAT Middleweight Champion. Kraus has also held four separate world titles in kickboxing and Muay Thai. He is currently fighting out of Super Pro Gym.

== Biography and career ==
Albert Kraus started boxing at 14 years old, later switching over to kickboxing aged 17 fighting out of Gino Albert Gym in Oss. In 1997 he had his first amateur fight, winning convincingly by first-round knockout. After numerous amateur victories Kraus switched to Bully's Gym in Rhenen. He made his professional debut in 1999 in Rotterdam, defeating his opponent Kany via second-round knockout. By 2001 he had won the Dutch F.I.M.A.C, European I.K.B.F and W.K.A World titles.

Kraus made his K-1 debut on February 24, 2002, at the K-1 World Grand Prix 2002 Preliminary Netherlands and was invited to the inaugural K-1 MAX World Championship on May 11, 2002. In the tournament quarter finals he faced Shane Chapman from New Zealand and won the evenly fought battle by a single point on the three judges' cards to take a unanimous decision. In the semi-finals Albert Kraus met local crowd favourite Masato. Kraus scored a down with a punch at 2:31 into the first round and held on to earn his second consecutive unanimous decision and advance to the finals. He needed just one minute to put Kaolan Kaovichit down with a punch combination to become the first-ever K-1 World Max Champion.

In 2003 Kraus switched to Super Pro Gym. He entered the K-1 World MAX 2003 World Tournament as reigning champion and tournament favourite. Kraus defeated both of his opponents by stoppage en route to the final but was unable to retain his title, losing to Masato by knockout at 2:26 of the second round. After the tournament Albert Kraus would continue fighting in a number of events in K-MAX and Super League, winning seven straight bouts through 2003 and 2004 and qualifying for the K-1 World MAX 2004 World Tournament Final where he would reach the semi-finals. The following year, Albert Kraus would once more take part in the K-1 World MAX 2005 Championship defeating John Wayne Parr in the quarter-finals only to lose to Thai fighter Buakaw Por. Pramuk in the semi-finals. Despite the disappointment of another semi final defeat, Kraus would finish the year on a high by defeating Menno Dijkstra at Kraus's hometown of Oss to win the I.K.B.A. world title.

2006 would be a mixed year for Albert Kraus. He suffered an early exit at the quarter-final stage of the K-1 World MAX 2006 World Championship to Gago Drago but did manage to regain his I.K.B.A. World title by defeating James Martinez. 2007 started badly for Albert as he lost two straight fights, including a shock decision loss to little known Japanese fighter Tatsuji. He improved as the year progressed qualifying for the 6th annual K-1 World MAX Final on October 3, 2007. Kraus fought and defeated Yoshihiro Sato by decision in the quarter-finals and in the semis he met 2005 Champion Andy Souwer and lost the battle by majority decision. Souwer went on to fight Masato in the finals and eventually won the championship.

Kraus had a stuttering start to 2008, losing his World Full Contact Association (W.F.C.A.) Thai Boxing junior middleweight world title fight to Faldir Chahbari and missing out on qualification for the K-1 MAX World Final for the very first time by losing to Buakaw Por. Pramuk at the K-1 World MAX 2008 World Championship Tournament Final 16. Losing out on a place at the final seemed to re-invigorate Kraus as he went on a seven match winning streak throughout 2008 and the beginning of 2009 – a streak that included winning the 2008 "King Of The Ring" Welterweight World title. He finally tasted defeat at the K-1 World MAX 2009 Final 8 quarter final stage to eventual champion Giorgio Petrosyan. Since that defeat Albert Kraus has won five straight and has booked his place in the quarter-finals of the forthcoming K-1 World MAX 2010 Final by defeating Hiroki Nakajima by decision at the K-1 World MAX 2010 World Championship Tournament Final 16. He again tasted defeat at the K-1 World MAX 2010 quarter final stage to the reigning champion Giorgio Petrosyan who would go on to win the tournament.

He knocked out Ekapop Sor Klinmee in round 1 at Fighterzone Kickboxing World Series MAX in Singapore on February 25, 2012.

He lost against Abraham Roqueñi on April 28, 2012, in Torrelavega, Spain at a 70 kg contest.

He was drawn against Sanny Dahlbeck in the quarter-finals of the Glory 3: Rome - 2012 Middleweight Slam Final 8 to be held on November 3, 2012, in Rome, Italy. However, he was struck down with the flu in the week leading up to tournament and had to be replaced by Yoshihiro Sato.

On December 31, 2012, Kraus won a Wu Lin Feng eight-man tournament in Beijing, China. He was drawn against 18-year-old Zhang Zhao Yu in the quarter-finals, and was able to wear the youngster down and stop him in the third round with a series of body punches. In the semis, he forced two first-round referee counts on Wang Wei Hao, who was also deducted a point for using a Sanshou-style takedown on Kraus. Behind heavily on the scorecards, Wang's corner stopped him from continuing at the end of round one and Kraus marched into the finals to face Dong Wen Fei. Kraus dropped Dong three times before finishing him off with a high kick in round two to win the tournament and $100,000 prize money.

He was set to fight Andy Ristie at Glory 5: London on March 23, 2013, in London, England but Ristie was forced to withdraw due to visa issues and replaced by Warren Stevelmans. Kraus defeated Stevelmans via unanimous decision.

The Kraus-Ristie fight was rescheduled for Glory 8: Tokyo - 2013 65kg Slam on May 3, 2013. Ristie KO'd Kraus with a knee in round two.

Kraus was to fight Jordan Watson at Glory 10: Los Angeles - Middleweight World Championship Tournament in Ontario, California, United States on September 28, 2013 but Watson was unable to compete due to visa issues and was replaced by Ky Hollenbeck. He lost by unanimous decision.

He lost to Aikpracha Meenayothin by split decision at Glory 14: Zagreb in Zagreb, Croatia on March 8, 2014.

Kraus rematched Zheng Zhaoyu at Kunlun 5 in Chengdu, China on June 1, 2014, and defeated him once again, knocking him out with a second round knee.

He beat Erkan Varol via unanimous decision at Qabala Fight Series #1 in Qabala, Azerbaijan on June 29, 2014.

== Titles ==
- 2012 WLF-World 8 Man Tournament Champion (-70 kg)
- 2011 SUPERKOMBAT Middleweight Championship (-72 kg)
- 2008 W.I.P.U. "King Of The Ring" Muay Thai Super Welterweight World Champion (-70 kg)
- 2005-06 I.K.B.A. Thai-Boxing World Champion -70 kg (1 title defense)
- 2003 K-1 World MAX Finalist
- 2002 K-1 World MAX Champion
- 2001 W.K.A. World Champion
- W.P.K.A. Benelux Champion 2000

== Professional kickboxing record ==
Professional Kickboxing Record
115 Wins (79 (T)KO's), 30 Losses, 3 Draw, No Contest
Date	Result	Opponent	Event	Location	Method	Round	Time
2022-12-28	Loss	(Japan) Meison Hide Usami	INOKI BOM-BA-YE × Ganryujima	Tokyo, Japan	Decision (Unanimous)	3	3:00
2019-05-24	Loss	(Czech Republic) Michael Krcmar	Heroes Gate 22	Prague, Czech Republic	Decision	3	3:00
2018-07-13	Loss	(Russia) Adsalam Barkinkhoev	ACB KB 16	Romania	Decision	3	3:00
2018-05-13	Loss	(China) Li Zhuangzhuang	Kunlun Fight 74	China	Decision (Split)	3	3:00
2018-02-17	Loss	(Morocco) Nordin Ben Moh	Enfusion 5th Anniversary	Eindhoven, Netherlands	Decision (Unanimous)	3	3:00
2017-11-05	Win	(China) Li Zhuangzhuang	Kunlun Fight 66	China	Decision (Unanimous)	3	3:00
2016-09-24	Win	(China) Ma Shuo	Kunlun Fight 53	Beijing, China	KO (Left Body Hook)	2	2:15
2016-08-07	Loss	(Japan) Hinata Watanabe	Kunlun Fight 49 / Rebels 45	Tokyo, Japan	Decision (Unanimous)	3	3:00
2016-06-25	Win	(China) Li Zhuangzhuang	Kunlun Fight 46	Kunming, China	Decision	3	3:00
2016-03-20	Loss	(China) Gu Hui	Kunlun Fight 39	Dongguan, China	Ext. R Decision (Split)	4	3:00
2016-01-09	Win	(China) Liu Mingzhi	Kunlun Fight 36	Shanghai, China	KO	3	
2015-10-16	Win	(Romania) Marius Tiţă	ACB KB 3: Grand Prix Final	Sibiu, Romania	Decision (unanimous)	3	3:00
2015-07-19	Win	(China) Zhao Yan	Kunlun Fight 28	Nanjing, China	TKO	2	
2015-03-08	Win	(Japan) Yokoyama Gō	K-LEGEND 2015 Okayama	Okayama, Japan	KO (punches)	3	2:47
2015-01-31	Loss	(China) Zhou Zhipeng	Wu Lin Feng World Championship 2015	Chongqing, China	Decision (unanimous)	3	3:00
2014-11-16	Win	(China) Li Yankun	Kunlun Fight 13	Hohhot, China	Decision (unanimous)	3	3:00
2014-06-29	Win	(Turkey) Erkan Varol	Qabala Fight Series #1	Qabala, Azerbaijan	Decision (unanimous)	3	3:00
2014-06-01	Win	(China) Zheng Zhaoyu	Kunlun Fight 5	Chengdu, China	KO (right knee)	2	0:55
2014-03-08	Loss	(Thailand) Aikpracha Meenayothin	Glory 14: Zagreb	Zagreb, Croatia	Decision (split)	3	3:00
2014-01-18	Loss	(Iran) Seyedisa Alamdarnezam	WLF World 70 kg 8 Man Tournament, Quarter-finals	Hubei, China	Decision (majority)	3	3:00
2013-09-28	Loss	(United States) Ky Hollenbeck	Glory 10: Los Angeles	Ontario, California, USA	Decision (unanimous)	3	3:00
2013-05-03	Loss	(Suriname) Andy Ristie	Glory 8: Tokyo	Tokyo, Japan	KO (knee)	2	2:27
2013-03-23	Win	(South Africa) Warren Stevelmans	Glory 5: London	London, England	Decision (unanimous)	3	3:00
2013-01-01	Win	(China) Dong Wenfei	Wu Lin Feng 70 kg Tournament, Final	Beijing, China	KO (right high kick)	2	2:45
Wins WLF-World 8 Man Tournament -70 kg Final.
2012-12-31	Win	(China) Wang Weihao	Wu Lin Feng 70 kg Tournament, Semi-finals	Beijing, China	TKO (corner stoppage)	1	3:00
2012-12-31	Win	(China) Zheng Zhaoyu	Wu Lin Feng 70 kg Tournament, Quarter-finals	Beijing, China	TKO (punches to the body)	3	
2012-05-26	Win	(Denmark) Mohamed El-Mir	Glory 1: Stockholm – 70 kg Slam Tournament, First Round	Stockholm, Sweden	Decision	3	3:00
2012-04-14	Loss	(Spain) Abraham Roqueñi	Born To Fight	Torrelavega, Spain	Decision (unanimous)	3	3:00
2012-02-25	Win	(Thailand) Ekapop Sor Klinmee	Fighterzone Kickboxing World Series MAX	Singapore	KO (right uppercut)	1	
2011-11-19	Win	(Germany) Alexander Schmitt	SUPERKOMBAT World Grand Prix 2011 Final	Darmstadt, Germany	KO (punches)	2	2:37
Wins Vacant SUPERKOMBAT Middleweight Championship.
2011-09-25	Loss	(Japan) Yūji Nashiro	K-1 World MAX 2011 -70kg Japan Tournament Final, Quarter-final	Osaka, Japan	Decision (Unanimous)	3	3:00
2011-06-25	Loss	(Japan) Yoshihiro Sato	K-1 World MAX 2011 –63 kg Japan Tournament Final, Super fight	Tokyo, Japan	Decision (Majority)	3	3:00
2011-05-21	Win	(Romania) Marius Tiţă	SUPERKOMBAT World Grand Prix I 2011	Bucharest, Romania	KO (right high kick)	1	1:55
2011-03-12	Loss	(Russia) Batu Khasikov	Fight Nights: Battle of Moscow 3	Moscow, Russia	Decision (unanimous)	3	3:00
2010-11-27	Win	(Germany) Mohammed Gur	Mix Fight Gala XI	Sindelfingen, Germany	Decision	3	3:00
2010-11-08	Loss	(Italy) Giorgio Petrosyan	K-1 World MAX 2010 Final	Tokyo, Japan	Decision (unanimous)	3	3:00
2010-07-05	Win	(Japan) Hiroki Nakajima	K-1 World MAX 2010 Final 16 – Part 1	Tokyo, Japan	Decision (unanimous)	3	3:00
Qualifies for K-1 World MAX 2010 Final.
2010-06-12	Win	(Turkey) Tefik Sucu	Beast of the East 2010 Poland	Gdynia, Poland	KO (left + right hook)	1	0:31
2010-03-07	Win	(Netherlands) William Diender	Time For Action presents: Team SuperPro 10 Year Anniversary	Nijmegen, Netherlands	Decision (Unanimous)	3	3:00
2009-12-12	Win	(Slovakia) Jan Mazur	K-1 ColliZion 2009 Final Tournament, Super Fight	Prague, Czech Republic	TKO (ref stop/3 knockdowns)	3	1:30
2009-10-26	Win	(Japan) Kozo Takeda	K-1 World MAX 2009 World Championship Final	Yokohama, Japan	TKO (Ref Stop)	2	2:19
2009-07-13	Loss	(Italy) Giorgio Petrosyan	K-1 World MAX 2009 Final 8	Fukuoka, Japan	Decision (unanimous)	3	3:00
Fails to qualify for K-1 World MAX 2009 World Championship Final.
2009-04-21	Win	(Japan) Yuichiro Nagashima	K-1 World MAX 2009 Final 16	Fukuoka, Japan	KO (punches)	1	1:04
Qualifies for K-1 World MAX 2009 Final 8.
2009-02-23	Win	(South Korea) Su-hwan Lee	K-1 World MAX 2009 Japan Tournament	Tokyo, Japan	Decision (unanimous)	3	3:00
2009-01-24	Win	(South Africa) Warren Stevelmans	Beast Of The East 2009	Zutphen, Netherlands	Decision	3	3:00
2008-11-29	Win	(Thailand) Buakaw Por. Pramuk	It's Showtime 2008 Eindhoven	Eindhoven, Netherlands	Decision	3	3:00
2008-10-01	Win	(Japan) Yasuhiro Kido	K-1 World MAX 2008 World Championship Tournament Reserve Fight	Tokyo, Japan	TKO (doc stop)	2	0:48
2008-07-07	Win	(Greece) Mike Zambidis	K-1 World MAX 2008 World Championship Tournament Final 8	Tokyo, Japan	TKO (doc stop/cut)	3	3:00
2008-05-24	Win	(Turkey) Ali Gunyar	Gentleman Promotions Fightnight	Tilburg, Netherlands	KO (knee strike)	2	
Wins vacant W.I.P.U. "King Of The Ring" Muay Thai Super Welterweight world title -70 kg.
2008-04-09	Loss	(Thailand) Buakaw Por. Pramuk	K-1 World MAX 2008 World Championship Tournament Final 16	Tokyo, Japan	Ext.R Decision (unanimous)	4	3:00
Fails to qualify for the K-1 World MAX 2008 World Championship Tournament Final 8.
2008-01-26	Loss	(Morocco) Faldir Chahbari	Beast of the East 2008	Zutphen, Netherlands	Decision	5	3:00
Fight was for vacant W.F.C.A. Thai-boxing junior middleweight world title -69.85 kg.
2007-12-16	Win	(Turkey) Özkan Kose	KlasH Champions Battlefield IV	Oss, Netherlands	Decision	3	3:00
2007-10-03	Loss	(Netherlands) Andy Souwer	K-1 World MAX 2007 World Championship Semi-finals	Tokyo, Japan	Decision (majority)	3	3:00
2007-10-03	Win	(Japan) Yoshihiro Sato	K-1 World MAX 2007 World Championship Quarter-finals	Tokyo, Japan	Decision (unanimous)	3	3:00
2007-07-21	Win	(South Korea) Han-wul Kim	K-1 Fighting Network KHAN 2007	Seoul, South Korea	KO (high kick)	1	2:03
2007-06-28	Win	(South Africa) Virgil Kalakoda	K-1 World MAX 2007 World Tournament Final Elimination	Tokyo, Japan	Decision (unanimous)	3	3:00
Qualifies for K-1 World MAX 2007 World Championship.
2007-05-20	Win	(England) Peter Crooke	K-1 UK MAX Tournament 2007 Pain & Glory, Super Fight	London, England	Decision	3	3:00
2007-04-04	Loss	(Japan) Tatsuji	K-1 World MAX 2007 World Elite Showcase	Yokohama, Japan	Decision (unanimous)	3	3:00
2007-02-05	Loss	(Turkey) Murat Direkci	K-1 World MAX 2007 Japan Tournament	Tokyo, Japan	KO (right hook)	1	1:27
2006-12-17	Win	(United States) James Martinez	IKBO World Title Fight	Oss, Netherlands	TKO	2	
Retains I.K.B.A. Thai-Boxing World Title -70 kg.
2006-11-24	Win	(Sweden) Osvaldo Palma	K-1 World MAX North European Qualification 2007	Stockholm, Sweden	KO (punches)	1	2:29
2006-09-04	Win	(Japan) Yoshihiro Sato	K-1 World MAX 2006 Champions' Challenge	Tokyo, Japan	Decision (majority)	3	3:00
2006-06-30	Loss	(Armenia) Gago Drago	K-1 World MAX 2006 World Championship Quarter-finals	Yokohama, Japan	Decision (unanimous)	3	3:00
2006-04-05	Win	(Turkey) Ali Gunyar	K-1 World MAX 2006 World Tournament Open	Tokyo, Japan	Decision (unanimous)	3	3:00
Qualifies for K-1 World MAX 2006 World Championship.
2005-12-18	Win	(Netherlands) Menno Dijkstra	I.K.B.A. World Championships	Oss, Netherlands	Decision (unanimous)	5	3:00
Wins I.K.B.A. Thai-Boxing World Title -70 kg.
2005-11-05	Win	(South Korea) Chi-bin Lim	K-1 Fighting Network Korea MAX 2005	Seoul, South Korea	Decision (unanimous)	3	3:00
2005-10-12	Win	(Japan) Akira Ohigashi	K-1 World MAX 2005 Champions' Challenge	Tokyo, Japan	KO (punches)	2	1:31
2005-07-20	Loss	(Thailand) Buakaw Por. Pramuk	K-1 World MAX 2005 Championship Semi-finals	Yokohama, Japan	Decision (unanimous)	3	3:00
2005-07-20	Win	(Australia) John Wayne Parr	K-1 World MAX 2005 Championship Quarter-finals	Yokohama, Japan	Decision (unanimous)	3	3:00
2005-05-04	Win	(South Africa) Virgil Kalakoda	K-1 World MAX 2005 World Tournament Open	Tokyo, Japan	Decision (unanimous)	3	3:00
Qualifies for K-1 World MAX 2005 World Championship.
2005-02-23	Win	(Thailand) Buakaw Por. Pramuk	K-1 World MAX 2005 Japan Tournament	Tokyo, Japan	Ext.R Decision (split)	4	3:00
2004-12-18	Win	(Portugal) Jose Barradas	SuperLeague Netherlands 2004	Uden, Netherlands	TKO (ref stop/3 knockdowns)	1	2:37
2004-10-13	Loss	(Japan) Takayuki Kohiruimaki	K-1 World MAX 2004 Champions' Challenge	Tokyo, Japan	Decision (unanimous)	3	3:00
2004-09-19	Win	(Thailand) Changpuek Chorsepasert	Shoot Boxing World Tournament 2004, Quarter Finals	Yokohama, Japan	Ext.R Decision (Unanimous)	4	3:00
Had to withdraw from tournament despite winning bout due to injury.
2004-07-07	Loss	(Japan) Masato	K-1 World MAX 2004 World Tournament Semi-finals	Tokyo, Japan	Decision (unanimous)	3	3:00
2004-07-07	Win	(Russia) Shamil Gaidarbekov	K-1 World MAX 2004 World Tournament Quarter-finals	Tokyo, Japan	Decision (majority)	3	3:00
2004-05-22	Win	(Switzerland) Mikel Colaj	SuperLeague Switzerland 2004	Winterthur, Switzerland	TKO	4	3:00
2004-04-07	Win	(Mongolia) Jadamba Narantungalag	K-1 World MAX 2004 World Tournament Open	Tokyo, Japan	Ext.R Decision (unanimous)	4	3:00
Qualifies for K-1 World MAX 2004 World Tournament.
2004-02-24	Win	(Japan) Takashi Ohno	K-1 World MAX 2004 Japan Tournament	Tokyo, Japan	KO (punches)	1	2:31
2003-12-06	Win	(Germany) Roman Logish	SuperLeague Netherlands 2003	Rotterdam, Netherlands	TKO (corner stop)	3	
2003-11-18	Win	(Japan) Genki Sudo	K-1 World MAX 2003 Champions' Challenge	Tokyo, Japan	Decision (unanimous)	3	3:00
2003-09-27	Win	(France) Moussa Konaté	SuperLeague Germany 2003	Wuppertal, Germany	TKO (corner stop)	2	3:00
2003-07-05	Loss	(Japan) Masato	K-1 World MAX 2003 World Tournament Final	Saitama, Japan	KO (left hook)	2	2:26
Fight was for K-1 World MAX 2003 World Championship title.
2003-07-05	Win	(United States) Duane Ludwig	K-1 World MAX 2003 World Tournament Semi-finals	Saitama, Japan	KO (left hook)	3	1:33
2003-07-05	Win	(Netherlands) Andy Souwer	K-1 World MAX 2003 World Tournament Quarter-finals	Saitama, Japan	TKO (Doc Stop)	3	3:00
2003-05-24	Win	(Czech Republic) Martin Karaivanov	Heaven or Hell	Prague, Czech Republic	KO	2	
2003-03-01	Loss	(Greece) Mike Zambidis	K-1 World MAX 2003 Japan Grand Prix	Tokyo, Japan	KO (right hook)	2	0:16
2002-10-11	Draw	(Japan) Masato	K-1 World MAX 2002 Champions' Challenge	Tokyo, Japan	Decision Draw	5	3:00
2002-05-11	Win	(Thailand) Kaolan Kaovichit	K-1 World MAX 2002 World Tournament Final	Tokyo, Japan	KO (punches)	1	1:00
Wins K-1 World MAX 2002 World Championship title.
2002-05-11	Win	(Japan) Masato	K-1 World MAX 2002 World Tournament Semi-finals	Tokyo, Japan	Decision (Unanimous)	3	3:00
2002-05-11	Win	(New Zealand) Shane Chapman	K-1 World MAX 2002 World Tournament Quarter-finals	Tokyo, Japan	Decision (Unanimous)	3	3:00
2002-02-24	Win	(Israel) Francis Itay	K-1 World Grand Prix 2002 Preliminary Netherlands	Arnhem, Netherlands	TKO	2	1:46
2001-09-23	Loss	(Germany) Kamal El Amrani	Battle of Arnhem III	Arnhem, Netherlands	Decision	7	2:00
2000-09-03	Win	(Netherlands) Franklin Beuk	"Veselic meets Dejpitak"	Rotterdam, Netherlands	Decision	5	2:00
1999-02-07	Win	(Netherlands) Kany	Matter of Honour	Rotterdam, Netherlands	KO	2	
Legend: Win Loss Draw/No contest Notes

== Professional Boxing record ==
5 Wins (4 knockouts, 1 decision), 0 Losses,0 Draws
Res.	Record	Opponent	Type	Rd., Time	Date	Location	Notes
Win	9-39-1	(Slovakia) Miroslav Kvocka	TKO	3 (6), 2:38	2014-10-04	(Germany) Fulda, Hessen	
Win	4-23-1	(Slovakia) Vladimir Tazik	KO	3 (6)	2013-12-14	(Belgium) Essen, Antwerpen	
Win	6-6-0	(United Kingdom) Nicky Jenman	PTS	4	2013-11-06	(United Kingdom) Bluewater, Greenhithe, Kent	
Win	0-10-0	(Wales) Joe Jones	TKO	1 (4), 1:57	2013-06-08	(United Kingdom) Bluewater, Greenhithe, Kent	
Win	0-0-0	(Romania) Valentin Cimpoeru	RTD	4 (6)	2012-09-02	(Netherlands) De Uithof, Den Haag	Kraus boxing debut.

== See also ==
- List of K-1 events
- List of male kickboxers
- List of K-1 champions
