= K-1 World MAX 2002 World Tournament final =

K-1 kickboxing events in 2002

K-1 World MAX 2002 World Tournament Final
- Promotion: K-1
- Date: May 11, 2002
- Venue: Nippon Budokan
- City: Tokyo, Japan
- Attendance: 8,450

Event chronology
K-1 World Grand Prix 2002 Preliminary Ukraine	K-1 World MAX 2002 World Tournament Final	K-1 World Grand Prix 2002 in Paris

K-1 World MAX 2002 World Tournament Final was a kickboxing event promoted by the K-1 Organisation. It was the inaugural K-1 World MAX final for middleweight kickboxers (70 kg/154 lb weight class), consisting of eight finalists and two reserve fighters, with all bouts fought under K-1 rules. The tournament fighters had qualified via preliminary tournaments or had been invited due to their achievements in the world of kickboxing and Muay Thai (more information on the fighters is displayed by the bulleted list below). In total there were ten fighters at the event, representing seven countries.

The tournament winner was Albert Kraus who defeated Kaolan Kaovichit by first round knockout to become the first ever K-1 MAX champion. Of the two fighters, Kraus had the tougher path to the final having had to beat Shane Chapman and home favourite Masato en route to the final. The event was held at the Nippon Budokan in Tokyo, Japan on Saturday, 11 May 2002.

Finalists

- (New Zealand) Shane Chapman - K-1 Oceania MAX 2001 champion, x2 Muay Thai world champion
- (Switzerland) Marino Deflorin - invitee, multiple Muay Thai world champion (W.A.K.O. Pro, W.K.A., W.K.N., I.K.B.O.)
- (Thailand) Kaolan Kaovichit - invitee, Lumpinee Stadium finalist
- Takayuki Kohiruimaki - K-1 Japan MAX 2002 runner up, I.S.K.A. oriental rules super welterweight world champion '00
- (Netherlands) Albert Kraus - invitee, W.K.A. world champion '01
- (United States) Duane Ludwig - K-1 World MAX 2002 USA champion, x2 I.K.F. U.S.A. national Muay Thai amateur champion
- Masato - K-1 Japan MAX 2002 champion, I.S.K.A. oriental rules welterweight world champion '00, A.J.K.F welterweight champion '99
- (China) Zhang Jiapo - invitee, Sanda fighter

Reservists

- (Japan) Ohno 崇

- K-1 Japan MAX 2002  3rd place, I.S.K.A. Muay Thai middleweight world champion 

- (Thailand) Changpuak Weerasaklek - invitee, Rajadamnern Stadium finalist

== K-1 World MAX 2002 World Tournament Final ==
Quarter Finals
(United States) Duane Ludwig
(Japan) Masato	DEC
(New Zealand) Shane Chapman
(Netherlands) Albert Kraus	DEC
(Switzerland) Marino Deflorin
(Japan) Takayuki Kohiruimaki	KO
(Thailand) Kaolan Kaovichit	DEC
(China) Zhang Jiapo

Semi Finals
(Japan) Masato
(Netherlands) Albert Kraus	DEC
(Japan) Takayuki Kohiruimaki
(Thailand) Kaolan Kaovichit	KO

Final
(Netherlands) Albert Kraus	KO
(Thailand) Kaolan Kaovichit

== Results ==
K-1 World MAX 2002 World Tournament Final Results
K-1 World MAX Tournament Reserve Fight -70 kg: K-1 Rules / 3Min. 3R Ext.1R
(Thailand) Changpuak Weerasaklek def. Takashi Ohno (Japan)
Weerasaklek defeated Ohno by KO at 1:48 of the 1st Round.
K-1 World MAX Tournament Quarter Finals -70 kg: K-1 Rules / 3Min. 3R Ext.1R
(Japan) Masato def. Duane Ludwig (United States)
Masato defeated Ludwig by 3rd Round Unanimous Decision 3-0 (30-28, 30-27, 30-28).
(Netherlands) Albert Kraus def. Shane Chapman (New Zealand)
Kraus defeated Chapman by 3rd Round Unanimous Decision 3-0 (30-29, 30-29, 30-29).
(Japan) Takayuki Kohiruimaki def. Marino Deflorin (Switzerland)
Kohiruimaki defeated Deflorin by KO (Left Knee) at 1:12 of the 1st Round.
(Thailand) Kaolan Kaovichit def. Zhang Jiapo (China)
Kaovichit defeated Zhang by 3rd Round Unanimous Decision 3-0 (30-28, 30-27, 30-27).
K-1 World MAX Tournament Semi Finals -70 kg: K-1 Rules / 3Min. 3R Ext.1R
(Netherlands) Albert Kraus def. Masato (Japan)
Kraus defeated Masato by 3rd Round Unanimous Decision 3-0 (29-28, 29-28, 30-28).
(Thailand) Kaolan Kaovichit def. Takayuki Kohiruimaki (Japan)
Kaovichit defeated Kohiruimaki by KO (Right Knee) at 2:42 of the 2nd Round.
K-1 World MAX Tournament Final -70 kg: K-1 Rules / 3Min. 3R Ext.2R
(Netherlands) Albert Kraus def. Kaolan Kaovichit (Thailand)
Kraus defeated Kaovichit by KO (Punches) at 1:00 of the 1st Round .

== See also ==
- List of K-1 events
- List of K-1 champions
- List of male kickboxers
