= Nashiro =

Nashiro (written: 名城) is a Japanese surname. Notable people with the surname include:

- Nobuo Nashiro (名城 信男, born 1981), Japanese boxer
- Yūji Nashiro (名城 裕司, born 1983), Japanese kickboxer
