= University of Marketing and Distribution Sciences =

Coordinates: 34.686916°N 135.057356°E

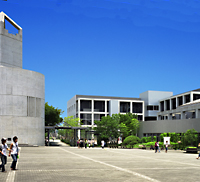
University of Marketing and Distribution Sciences

University of Marketing and Distribution Sciences (流通科学大学, Ryūtsū kagaku daigaku) is a private university in Kobe, Hyōgo, Japan, established in 1988.
