= Hiroya =

- Gender: Male

Origin
- Origin: Japanese
- Meaning: Different meanings depending on the kanji used

Hiroya is a masculine Japanese given name. Notable people with the name include:

== Written forms ==
- 博也, "command, to be (classical)"
- 弘也, "vast, to be (classical)"
- 浩哉, "wide expanse, how"
- 裕哉, "abundant, how"
- 寛也, "tolerant, to be (classical)"
- 寛弥, "tolerant, all the more"
- 大也, "large, to be (classical)"
- 裕也, "abundant, to be (classical)"
- 碩哉, "great, how"
- ひろや in hiragana
- ヒロヤ in katakana

== People ==
- Hiroya (kickboxer) (弘也; born 1992), Japanese kickboxer
- Hiroya Ebina (蝦名 大也; 1959–2026), Japanese mayor
- Hiroya Hatsushiba (初芝 弘也), Japanese video game musician
- Hiroya Ino (井野 碩哉; 1891–1980), Japanese politician
- Hiroya Ishimaru (石丸 博也; born 1941), Japanese voice actor
- Hiroya Masuda (増田 寛也; born 1951), Japanese politician
- Hiroya Matsumoto (松本 寛也; born 1986), Japanese actor
- Hiroya Nodake (野嶽 寛也; born 2000), Japanese footballer
- Hiroya Oku (奥 浩哉; born 1967), Japanese manga artist
- Hiroya Ozaki (尾崎 裕哉; born 1989), Japanese singer-songwriter
- Hiroya Saito (斉藤 浩哉; born 1970), Japanese ski jumper
- Hiroya Sato (佐藤 寛弥; born 1976), Japanese rower

== Fictional Characters ==
- Hiroya (ヒロヤ), a character from Digimon Fusion
- Hiroya Aikawa (相川 ひろや), a character from Fancy Lala
- Hiroya Matsumoto (松本 広哉), a character from The Special Duty Combat Unit Shinesman
- Hiroya Okuyama (奥山 広也), a character from Initial D
- Hiroya Sakai (坂井 弘也), a character from Dive!!
- Hiroya Yoshizumi (吉住 比呂哉), a character from Gakuen Heaven
