= Outpoint =

Outpoint is a term frequently used in boxing to describe a situation in which one boxer is awarded more points than their opponent by the judges, but does not knock out that opponent.
