= Shoot Boxing World Tournament 2010 =

- The poster for Shoot Boxing World Tournament 2010
- Promotion: Shoot boxing
- Date: November 23, 2010
- Venue: JCB Hall
- City: Tokyo, Japan

Event chronology
Shoot Boxing World Tournament 2008	Shoot Boxing World Tournament 2010

Shoot Boxing World Tournament 2010 or S-Cup 2010 was a shoot boxing event promoted by Caesar Takeshi. It was the seven bi-annual (70kg/154lbs weight class) Shoot Boxing World Tournament, featuring an eight-man single elimination format, with one reserve fight, all fought under Shoot Boxing Rules. The eight finalists and two reserve fighters were a mixture of invitees or had been involved in previous events (for more detail on this see the bulleted list below). As well as tournament matches there were also two 'Opening Fights', a 'Women's Fight' and three 'Super Fights' all fought under Shoot Boxing Rules (various weight classes). In total there were twenty-two fighters at the event, representing six countries.

The tournament winner was Buakaw Por. Pramuk who defeated Toby Imada in the final by second round technical knockout. Both fighters were shoot boxing debutants, with Buakaw entering as the result of a dispute with K-1 and Imada a MMA fighter who was a late substitute for Charles "Krazy Horse" Bennett who was unable to attend due to legal issues which prevented him from leaving the United States. Although Buakaw won the event it was Imada who had the biggest effect on the tournament, defeating three time S-Cup champion Andy Souwer in the semi-finals in what was the biggest upset ever experienced in the sport. The event was held at the JCB Hall in Tokyo, Japan on Tuesday, November 23, 2010.

S-Cup 2010 Finalists

- (United States) Toby Imada - Invitee, Bellator Fighter (MMA), late replacement for Charles Bennett who was unable to participate due to legal issues
- (Netherlands) Henry van Opstal - Invitee, W.M.C. European Super Welterweight Champion
- (Thailand) Buakaw Por. Pramuk - Invitee, 2004, 2006 K-1 World MAX Champion
- (Australia) Rhyse Saliba - Invitee, W.M.C. Australian Super Welterweight Champion
- (Japan) Hiroki Shishido - S-Cup 2004 Runner-up
- (Netherlands) Andy Souwer - S-Cup 2008, S-Cup 2004 and S-Cup 2002 Champion
- (Thailand) Bovy Sor Udomsorn - Invitee
- (Japan) Takaaki Umeno - Invitee, Shoot Boxing Japanese Super Welterweight Champion

S-Cup 2010 Reservists

- (Japan) Kenji Kanai - Invitee, S-Cup 2008 Quarter-finalist
- (South Korea) Jun Hyuk Song - Invitee

== Bracket ==
Quarter-finals
(Netherlands) Andy Souwer	TKO
(Thailand) Bovy Sor Udomsorn
(Japan) Takaaki Umeno
(United States) Toby Imada	KO
(Thailand) Buakaw Por. Pramuk	DEC
(Japan) Hiroki Shishido
(Australia) Rhyse Saliba
(Netherlands) Henry van Opstal	DEC

Semi-finals
(Netherlands) Andy Souwer
(United States) Toby Imada	DEC
(Thailand) Buakaw Por. Pramuk	DEC
(Netherlands) Henry van Opstal

Final
(United States) Toby Imada
(Thailand) Buakaw Por. Pramuk	TKO

== Results ==
Shoot Boxing World Tournament 2010 Results
Opening Fight 1 –60 kg: Shoot Boxing Rules / 3Min. 3R
(Japan) Yuji Sugawara def. Masaya Matsuhana (Japan)
Sugawara defeated Matsuhana by KO (Body Shots) at 2:32 of the 1st round.
Opening Fight 2 –55 kg: Shoot Boxing Rules / 3Min. 3R
(Japan) Kazuyuki Fushimi def. Hiroaki Okuwa (Japan)
Fushimi defeated Okuwa by 3rd round Unanimous Decision 3-0.
Super Fight 1 –95 kg: Shoot Boxing Rules / 3Min. 3R
(Japan) Kengo Shimizu def. Shunsuke Inoue (Japan)
Shimizu defeated Inoue by TKO (Corner Stoppage) at 0:35 of the 3rd round.
S-Cup '10 Quarter-finals: Shoot Boxing Rules / 3Min. 3R Ext.1R
(Netherlands) Andy Souwer def. Bovy Sor. Udomsorn (Thailand)
Souwer defeated Sor. Udomsorn by KO (right hook) at 0:47 of the 3rd round.
(United States) Toby Imada def. Takaaki Umeno (Japan)
Imada defeated Umeno by KO (Uppercut) at 3:00 of the 3rd round.
(Thailand) Buakaw Por. Pramuk def. Hiroki Shishido (Japan)
Por. Pramuk defeated Shishido by 3rd round Unanimous Decision 3-0.
(Netherlands) Henri van Opstal def. Rhyse Saliba (Australia)
Van Opstal defeated Saliba by 3rd round Unanimous Decision 3-0.
S-Cup '10 Reserve Fight: Shoot Boxing Rules / 3Min. 3R Ext.1R
(South Korea) Jun Hyuk Song def. Kenji Kanai (Japan)
Song defeated Kanai by KO (Kick) at 1:59 of the 2nd round.
Women's Fight -54 kg: Shoot Boxing Rules / 3Min. 3R
(Japan) Ai Takahashi def. Karina Hallinan (United States)
Takahashi defeated Hallinan by 3rd round Unanimous Decision 3-0.
S-Cup '10 Semi-finals: Shoot Boxing Rules / 3Min. 3R Ext.1R
(United States) Toby Imada def. Andy Souwer (Netherlands)
Imada defeated Souwer by 3rd round Split Decision 2-1.
(Thailand) Buakaw Por. Pramuk def. Henri van Opstal (Netherlands)
Por. Pramuk defeated van Opstal by 3rd round Unanimous Decision 3-0.
Super Fight 2 –62 kg: Shoot Boxing Rules / 3Min. 3R
(Japan) Hiroaki Suzuki def. Mitsuhiro Ishida (Japan)
Suzuki defeated Ishida by KO at 2:21 of the 2nd round.
Super Fight 3 –65 kg: Shoot Boxing Rules / 3Min. 3R
(Japan) Daiki Hata def. Tomohiro Oikawa (Japan)
Hata defeated Oikawa by KO at 0:18 of the 3rd round.
S-Cup '10 Final: Shoot Boxing Rules / 3Min. 3R Ext.2R
(Thailand) Buakaw Por. Pramuk def. Toby Imada (United States)
Por. Pramuk defeated Imada by TKO (Leg Kicks) at 2:29 of the 2nd round.

== See also ==
- List of male kickboxers
