= Yamada: The Samurai of Ayothaya =

- Film poster
- Directed by: Nopporn Watin
- Written by: Nopporn Watin; Thanatat Kongthong; Thanawat Thirayaowapapong; Viroj Sukchu
- Produced by: Nopporn Watin; Salinee Phakdeephol
- Starring: Seigi Ozeki; Sorapong Chatree; Kanokkorn Jaicheun; Buakaw Por. Pramuk; Thanawut Kessaro; Mukuda Hann; Yonthida Nak-ong
- Production companies: Mahagaap Co., Ltd.
- Release date: December 2, 2010
- Running time: 100 minutes
- Country: Thailand
- Languages: Thai; Japanese; Burmese
- Budget: 100 million baht

Yamada: The Samurai of Ayothaya (Thai: ซามูไร อโยธยา) is a 2010 Thai action movie directed by Nopporn Watin. The film features renowned Muay Thai boxers Buakaw Por. Pramuk, Saenchai Sor. Kingstar, Yodsanklai Fairtex, and Anuwat Kaewsamrit along with the main cast of actors.

== Plot ==
Attacked and wounded by a group of traitorous Japanese ninja, a mercenary samurai named Yamada (Ozeki) is rescued and nursed back to health by a group of Thai warriors, in service to the King of Ayothaya. Confused by the mysterious identity of his assailants, Yamada stays with the warriors, befriending them, learning their art, and eventually pledging his loyalty and life to their cause and kingdom.

== Historical basis ==
The lead character in the film is based on Yamada Nagamasa, a Japanese adventurer who later became a governor in the Ayutthaya Kingdom.

== Cast ==
- Seigi Ozeki as Yamada Nagamasa
- Sorapong Chatree as Phra Khru
- Kanokkorn Jaicheun as Jumpa
- Buakaw Por. Pramuk as Ai-Seua
- Thanawut Ketsaro as Kham
- Mukuda Hann as Kuroda
- Yonthida Nak-ong as Krathin

=== Guest appearance ===
- Winai Kraibutr as King Naresuan
- Bin Bunluerit as King Nanda
- Somjit Jongjohor as Bodyguard of King Naresuan
- Charoenthong Kiatbanchong as Bodyguard of King Naresuan
- Yodsanklai Fairtex as Bodyguard of King Naresuan
- Saenchai Sor. Kingstar as Bodyguard of King Naresuan
- Anuwat Kaewsamrit as Bodyguard of King Naresuan
