= João Cunha (jiu-jitsu) =

L Brazilian Jiu-Jitsu practitioner

- Born: Rio de Janeiro, Brazil
- Nationality: Brazilian

João Cunha is a professional Brazilian Jiu-Jitsu practitioner.

== Pan American Brazilian Jiu Jitsu Championship ==
| Placed: | Weight: | Year: | Belt: |
|---|---|---|---|
| Gold | Middle | 2006 | Black |
| Bronze | Open Class | 2006 | Black |
| Gold | Middle | 2007 | Black |
| Gold | Light | 2008 | Black |
| Bronze | Middle | 2009 | Black |
| Gold | Light | 2010 | Black |
| Bronze | Light | 2012 | Black |

== Pan American NO-GI Championship ==
| Placed: | Weight: | Year: | Belt: |
|---|---|---|---|
| Gold | Light | 2006 | Black |
| Bronze | Light | 2007 | Black |
| Gold | Light | 2009 | Black |

== World NO-GI Championship ==
| Placed: | Weight: | Year: | Belt: |
|---|---|---|---|
| Bronze | Light | 2007 | Black |
| Bronze | Middle | 2008 | Black |
| Silver | Light | 2009 | Black |

== Brazilian National Jiu Jitsu Championship ==
| Placed: | Weight: | Year: | Belt: |
|---|---|---|---|
| Bronze | Middle | 2008 | Black |
| Silver | Middle | 2009 | Black |

== International Masters e Seniors ==
| Placed: | Weight: | Year: | Belt: |
|---|---|---|---|
| Bronze | Middle | 2008 | Black |

== International Masters e Seniors: No - Gi ==
| Placed: | Weight: | Year: | Belt: |
|---|---|---|---|
| Gold | Middle | 2007 | Black |
| Silver | Middle | 2009 | Black |

== American National Championship ==
| Placed: | Weight: | Year: | Belt: |
|---|---|---|---|
| Gold | Middle | 2007 | Black |
| Gold | Middle | 2008 | Black |
| Silver | Light | 2009 | Black |

== American National NO-GI Championship ==
| Placed: | Weight: | Year: | Belt: |
|---|---|---|---|
| Gold | Middle | 2008 | Black |
| Gold | Open Class | 2008 | Black |
| Gold | Light | 2009 | Black |
| Gold | Open Class | 2009 | Black |

== New York International Open Championship ==
| Placed: | Weight: | Year: | Belt: |
|---|---|---|---|
| Gold | Light | 2010 | Black |

== Las Vegas International Open Championship ==
| Placed: | Weight: | Year: | Belt: |
|---|---|---|---|
| Gold | Light | 2011 | Black |

== Mixed martial arts record ==
Professional record breakdown
| 2 matches | 2 wins | 0 losses |
| By knockout | 0 | 0 |
| By submission | 2 | 0 |
| By decision | 0 | 0 |

| Res. | Record | Opponent | Method | Event | Date | Round | Time | Location | Notes |
|---|---|---|---|---|---|---|---|---|---|
| Win | 2-0 | Toby Imada | Submission (Armbar) | Cage of Fire 5 | January 27, 2007 | 2 | 2:30 | Tijuana, Mexico | |
| Win | 1–0 | Steve Gomm | Decision | GC 5 - Rumble in the Rockies | August 19, 2001 | 2 | 5:00 | Denver, Colorado, United States | Pro Debut. |
