= Henri van Opstal =

Dutch kickboxer (born 1989)

- Born: February 20, 1989 (age 37) 's-Hertogenbosch, Netherlands
- Other names: The Japanese Killer
- Height: 1.82 m (5 ft 11 1/2 in)
- Weight: 70.0 kg (154.3 lb; 11.02 st)
- Division: Lightweight; Welterweight; Middleweight
- Style: Kickboxing, Muay Thai, Shoot boxing
- Stance: Orthodox
- Fighting out of: 's-Hertogenbosch, Netherlands
- Team: Souwer Sports Institute
- Years active: 2006-present

Kickboxing record
- Total: 35
- Wins: 25
- By knockout: 9
- Losses: 10
- By knockout: 1
- Draws: 0
- Last updated on: May 17, 2014

Henri van Opstal (born February 20, 1989) is a Dutch kickboxer who competes in the middleweight division. Van Opstal came to prominence by winning the WMC European Junior Middleweight Championship but found further success competing in Japan, taking wins over a number of the countries' top middleweights and finishing as runner-up in the Shoot Boxing World Tournament 2012.

His entrance music is "Proud Mary" by Tina Turner.

== Career ==
After building up an undefeated record on the Dutch kickboxing and Muay Thai scene, Henri van Opstal challenged Martin Akhtar for the WMC World Junior Welterweight (-63.5 kg/140 lb) Championship in Sweden, losing for the first time in his professional career by decision. Afterwards, he began moving up to the weight divisions, settling at middleweight and taking wins over the likes of Harut Grigorian and Denis Schneidmiller while becoming the WMC European Junior Middleweight (-69.85 kg/154 lb) Champion.

He made his K-1 debut at the K-1 World MAX 2010 West Europe Tournament in Utrecht, Netherlands on March 21, 2010, where faced Robin van Roosmalen in the quarter-finals. The bout was ruled a draw after the regulation three rounds and so it went into an extension round to decide the winner, after which van Roosmalen was given the nod and inflicted van Opstal's first loss in three years. He lost to another future star in Andy Ristie by decision at Fighting with the Stars in Paramaribo, Suriname on August 29, 2010. Venturing into the shoot boxing rule set, van Opstal received the call-up to his first S-Cup at the Shoot Boxing World Tournament 2010 in Tokyo, Japan on November 21, 2010. He easily outclassed Rhyse Saliba in the quarter-finals, knocking him down inside the opening thirty seconds and causing problems with his boxing throughout the match and winning by unanimous decision. He then lost to eventual champion Buakaw Por. Pramuk by the same margin in the semis, unable to rival the Thai's powerful kicks.

Van Opstal rematched Harut Grigorian at War of the Ring in Amsterdam, Netherlands on February 2, 2011, losing by unanimous decision but he soon made a successful return to Japan where he would go on to have a string of wins over some of the nation's top middleweights and earn the moniker of "the Japanese Killer". At Shoot Boxing 2011: Act 3 on June 5, 2011, he stopped former boxer Satoru Suzuki with low kicks in round two. He then beat Mohammed Aouragh by decision at Muay Thai Mania 4 in Rijswijk, Netherlands on October 23, 2011 before ending the year with a third straight win with a unanimous decision over Akihiro Gono at Shooto the Shoot 2011 on November 6, 2011.

In his first and only appearance in the It's Showtime promotion, van Opstal lost to Hafid el Boustati by unanimous decision at It's Showtime 2012 in Leeuwarden in Leeuwarden, Netherlands on January 28, 2012. Replacing Vahid Roshani, van Opstal took on Hinata at RISE 88 in Tokyo on June 2, 2012. After an even first two rounds, the Dutchman ended the fight with a high kick nineteen seconds in the third to score something of an upset. In the main event of REBELS.12 & It's Showtime Japan Countdown-2 in Tokyo on July 29, 2012, van Opstal improved to 4-0 over Japanese competition with a majority decision win over Hiroki Nakajima. Nakajima scored early to the body, but his lack of defense allowed van Opstal to find openings throughout the fight and pick apart his opponent. On October 28, 2012, he faced Yuichiro "Jienotsu" Nagashima at REBELS.13 in Tokyo with a place in the Shoot Boxing World Tournament 2012 on the line and he booked his spot in his second consecutive S-Cup by defeating Nagashima by unanimous decision. The 2012 S-Cup was held on November 17, 2012, and van Opstal outpointed tough Thai Bovy Sor Udomson to a unanimous decision in the quarter-finals. He was then set to take on Hiroaki Suzuki in the semi-finals but Suzuki could not continue in the tournament due to injury and so van Opstal instead fought reserve fighter Satoru Suzuki in a rematch. Van Opstal stopped Suzuki for a second time, dropping him twice in under a minute in round one and forcing the referee to call the fight off, setting up a match with his stable mate and mentor Andy Souwer in the final. Souwer beat van Opstal by way of unanimous decision.

Van Opstal lost to a Japanese foe for the first time at Shootboxing 2013: Act 1 on February 22, 2013, when he dropped a close majority decision to Yoshihiro Sato. On March 24, 2013, van Opstal participated in an eight man tournament to crown the WMTA World Super Welterweight (-69.85 kg/154 lb) Champion at Haarlem Fight Night IV in Haarlem, Netherlands. He cruised to decision wins over Kevin Hessling and Maiki Karathanasis in the quarter-finals and semi-finals, respectively, and met Armen Petrosyan in a five rounder in the final. Petrosyan caused damage with low kicks over the course of the fight and, after being thrown to the canvas a few times, van Opstal found it increasingly difficult to get up due to his legs being battered and his corner threw in the towel at the end of the third round. He made his return to K-1 to compete against Enriko Kehl in the K-1 World MAX 2013 World Championship Tournament Final 16 in Majorca, Spain on September 24, 2013, losing a unanimous decision.

After his successful boxing career, Henri switched to training others. "It gave me a kick to share my knowledge and transfer it to others."

When after a while he saw people change both physically and mentally, he was certain that this was what he wanted to continue. He decided to delve into training courses so that he could also help people in other specific areas. For example, he has his diploma as a fitness instructor and diploma as a personal trainer and medical fitness.

After completing the courses, Van Opstal began offering private lessons and established a boot camp group. In 2015, he opened HVO Personal Training, which offered personal training, private kickboxing and boxing lessons, and group classes. He also introduced the Get Fit with HVO group sessions that year.

== Championships and awards ==
=== Kickboxing ===
- Haarlem Fight Night
  - Haarlem Fight Night IV 70 kg/154 lb Tournament Runner-up
- World Muaythai Council
  - WMC European Junior Middleweight (-69.85 kg/154 lb) Championship
- World Shoot Boxing Association
  - Shoot Boxing World Tournament 2012 Runner-up

== Kickboxing record ==
Kickboxing record
25 wins (9 KOs), 10 losses, 0 draws
Date	Result	Opponent	Event	Location	Method	Round	Time	Record
2014-05-17	Win	(Netherlands) Jay de Veiga	A1 World Combat Cup, First Round	Eindhoven, Netherlands	Decision	3	3:00	25-10
Was unable to continue the tournament because of an injury.
2013-09-24	Loss	(Germany) Enriko Kehl	K-1 World MAX 2013 World Championship Tournament Final 16	Majorca, Spain	Decision (unanimous)	3	3:00	24-10
2013-03-24	Loss	(Italy) Armen Petrosyan	Haarlem Fight Night IV, Final	Haarlem, Netherlands	TKO (corner stoppage)	3	3:00	24-9
For the Haarlem Fight Night IV 70 kg/154 lb Tournament Championship and the WMTA World Super Welterweight (-69.85 kg/154 lb) Championship.
2013-03-24	Win	(Netherlands) Maiki Karathanasis	Haarlem Fight Night IV, Semi Finals	Haarlem, Netherlands	Decision	3	3:00	24-8
2013-03-24	Win	(Netherlands) Kevin Hessling	Haarlem Fight Night IV, Quarter Finals	Haarlem, Netherlands	Decision	3	3:00	23-8
2013-02-22	Loss	(Japan) Yoshihiro Sato	Shootboxing 2013: Act 1	Tokyo, Japan	Decision (majority)	3	3:00	22-8
2012-11-17	Loss	(Netherlands) Andy Souwer	Shoot Boxing World Tournament 2012, Final	Tokyo, Japan	Decision (unanimous)	3	3:00	22-7
For the Shoot Boxing World Tournament 2012 Championship.
2012-11-17	Win	(Japan) Satoru Suzuki	Shoot Boxing World Tournament 2012, Semi Finals	Tokyo, Japan	TKO (punches)	1	0:42	22-6
2012-11-17	Win	(Thailand) Bovy Sor Udomson	Shoot Boxing World Tournament 2012, Quarter Finals	Tokyo, Japan	Decision (majority)	3	3:00	21-6
2012-10-28	Win	(Japan) Yuichiro Nagashima	REBELS.13	Tokyo, Japan	Decision (unanimous)	3	3:00	20-6
2012-07-29	Win	(Japan) Hiroki Nakajima	REBELS.12 & It's Showtime Japan Countdown-2	Tokyo, Japan	Decision (majority)	3	3:00	19-6
2012-06-02	Win	(Japan) Hinata	RISE 88	Tokyo, Japan	KO (right high kick)	3	0:19	18-6
2012-01-28	Loss	(Morocco) Hafid el Boustati	It's Showtime 2012 in Leeuwarden	Leeuwarden, Netherlands	Decision (unanimous)	3	3:00	17-6
2011-11-06	Win	(Japan) Akihiro Gono	Shooto the Shoot 2011	Tokyo, Japan	Decision (unanimous)	3	3:00	
2011-10-23	Win	(Netherlands) Mohammed Aouragh	Muay Thai Mania 4	Rijswijk, Netherlands	Decision	3	3:00	
2011-06-05	Win	(Japan) Satoru Suzuki	Shoot Boxing 2011: Act 3	Tokyo, Japan	KO (right low kick)	2	0:36	
2011-02-12	Loss	(Armenia) Harut Grigorian	War of the Ring	Amsterdam, Netherlands	Decision (unanimous)	3	3:00	
2010-11-21	Loss	(Thailand) Buakaw Por. Pramuk	Shoot Boxing World Tournament 2010, Semi Finals	Tokyo, Japan	Decision (unanimous)	3	3:00	
2010-11-21	Win	(Australia) Rhyse Saliba	Shoot Boxing World Tournament 2010, Quarter Finals	Tokyo, Japan	Decision (unanimous)	3	3:00	
2010-08-29	Loss	(Suriname) Andy Ristie	Fighting with the Stars	Paramaribo, Suriname	Decision	3	3:00	
2010-03-21	Loss	(Netherlands) Robin van Roosmalen	K-1 World MAX 2010 West Europe Tournament, Quarter Finals	Utrecht, Netherlands	Extension round decision	4	3:00	
2010-01-30	Win	(Germany) Denis Schneidmiller	Beast of the East	Zutphen, Netherlands	Decision	3	3:00	
2009-11-14	Win	(Poland) Piotr Kobylański	Beast of the East	Gdynia, Poland	Decision	3	3:00	
2007-12-16	Win	(Armenia) Harut Grigorian	KlasH 4	Oss, Netherlands	Decision	3	3:00	
2007-11-24	Win	(Albania) Nedrim Ismaili	Shootboxing in the Autotron	Rosmalen, Netherlands	Decision	3	3:00	
2007-10-26	Win	(Romania) David	Klash III: Show No Mercy	Sibiu, Romania	TKO			
2006-10-21	Loss	(Sweden) Martin Akhtar		Sweden	Decision	5	3:00	
For the WMC World Junior Welterweight (-63.5 kg/140 lb) Championship.
2005-11-13	Win	(Netherlands) Moustafa Elfarissi	Time for Action	Nijmegen, Netherlands	Decision	5	3:00	
Legend: Win Loss Draw/No contest Notes
