= Toby Imada =

American mixed martial arts fighter

- Born: Timoteo Tobias Imada; April 20, 1978 (age 48); Los Angeles, California, United States
- Height: 5 ft 8 in (1.73 m)
- Weight: 145 lb (66 kg; 10 st 5 lb)
- Division: Light Heavyweight; Middleweight; Welterweight; Lightweight; Featherweight
- Reach: 69 in (175 cm)
- Style: Judo, wrestling, Brazilian jiu-jitsu, shootboxing
- Stance: Orthodox
- Fighting out of: Austin, Texas, United States
- Team: The Alliance MMA; Victory MMA
- Rank: Black Belt in Judo; Black Belt in Brazilian Jiu-Jitsu
- Years active: 1998–2013

Kickboxing record
- Total: 8
- Wins: 5
- By knockout: 2
- Losses: 3
- By knockout: 1

Mixed martial arts record
- Total: 49
- Wins: 30
- By knockout: 8
- By submission: 20
- By decision: 2
- Losses: 18
- By knockout: 4
- By submission: 6
- By decision: 7
- Unknown: 1
- Draws: 1

Other information
- Mixed martial arts record from Sherdog
- Last updated on: November 17, 2012

Timoteo Tobias Imada (born April 20, 1978) is a retired American mixed martial artist, grappler and kickboxer of Japanese and Mexican descent. A professional from 1998 until 2013, Imada competed for Bellator, King of the Cage, and the RFA. Imada won the 2009 Submission of the Year award for an inverted triangle choke, defeating Jorge Masvidal.

== Mixed martial arts career ==
=== Bellator ===
In the first season Bellator Lightweight Tournament, Imada advanced to the finals after defeating Alonzo Martinez and Jorge Masvidal. The upset win over Masvidal was notable for Imada's bizarre inverse triangle choke while Masvidal was standing up. The submission has been acknowledged by many MMA mediums as the Submission of the Year for 2009. He was awarded a Bazzie award from Inside MMA on HDNet for the unorthodox submission victory and Submission of the Year Honors at the World MMA Awards.

At Bellator 12, Imada fought top five ranked Eddie Alvarez for the chance to become the first Bellator Lightweight Champion. Alvarez got the better of the battle and won the fight in the second round via rear-naked choke.

Imada returned to Bellator the following April, entering the Lightweight Tournament for the second time. His first fight was originally to be a rematch against Jorge Masvidal. He was then scheduled to fight against Ferrid Kheder at Bellator 15, but an injury forced Kheder out of the bout. Instead, at Bellator 14 Imada fought James Krause and won via armbar submission. With the win over Krause, Imada moved onto the semi-final round against Carey Vanier. In the second round after Vanier lost his footing, Imada capitalized and applied an armbar that caused Vanier to tap out.

Imada then moved on to the finals taking place at Bellator 22. There, Imada fought Pat Curran in the Season Two Lightweight Tournament finals to see who would advance to fight champion Eddie Alvarez. Curran defeated Imada via controversial split decision. Immediately following the decision, some in the crowd began booing. Bellator Lightweight Champion Eddie Alvarez weighed in on the decision, saying "It was a tough fight. It could’ve gone either way.”

Bellator again signed Imada for their Lightweight Tournament taking place during their fourth season. Imada had his quarterfinal fight at Bellator 36. He was originally set to fight Ferrid Kheder who was overweight and decided to leave the arena and not weigh-in. Imada instead fought replacement Josh Shockley. Imada won the fight in the first round after Shockley verbally submitted from Imada's reverse omaplata. The win moved Imada into the semifinals. In the semifinals Imada fought Brazilian jiu-jitsu black belt Patricky Freire at Bellator 39. He was knocked out at 2:53 of the first round with a flying knee followed by a left hook.

Imada has also fought professionally in kickboxing. In his most recent bout, he defeated Mostafa Abdollahi by majority decision (27–27, 29–27, 29–27) in a non-tournament bout at the Shoot Boxing World Tournament 2012 in Tokyo, Japan on November 17, 2012.

== Championships and accomplishments ==
=== Mixed martial arts ===
- Bellator Fighting Championships
  - Bellator Season One Lightweight Tournament runner-up
  - Bellator Season Two Lightweight Tournament runner-up
- Total Combat
  - Total Combat Lightweight Championship (one time)
- Neutral Grounds
  - Neutral Grounds 6 Four-Man Tournament runner-up
  - Neutral Grounds 13 Four-Man Tournament runner-up
- Sports Illustrated
  - 2009 Submission of the Year vs. Jorge Masvidal at Bellator 5
- World MMA Awards
  - 2009 Submission of the Year vs. Jorge Masvidal at Bellator 5
- Sherdog
  - 2009 Submission of the Year vs. Jorge Masvidal on May 1
- Bloody Elbow
  - 2009 Submission of the Year vs. Jorge Masvidal at Bellator 5
- HDNet
  - 2009 Bazzie Awards: Submission of the Year vs. Jorge Masvidal on May 1
- FIGHT! Magazine
  - 2009 Submission of the Year vs. Jorge Masvidal on May 1
- Inside Fights
  - 2009 Submission of the Year vs. Jorge Masvidal on May 1
- Cagewriters
  - 2009 Submission of the Year vs. Jorge Masvidal at Bellator 5

=== Kickboxing ===
- Shoot Boxing
  - Shoot Boxing World Tournament 2010 runner-up

== Mixed martial arts record ==
Professional record breakdown
49 matches	30 wins	18 losses
By knockout	8	4
By submission	20	6
By decision	2	8
Draws	1	

Res.	Record	Opponent	Method	Event	Date	Round	Time	Location	Notes
Draw	30–18–1	Hiroyuki Takaya	Draw (majority)	Shoot Boxing: Ground Zero Tokyo 2013	November 16, 2013	3	5:00	Tokyo, Japan	Featherweight debut.
Loss	30–18	James Krause	Decision (unanimous)	Resurrection Fighting Alliance 6	January 18, 2013	3	5:00	Kansas City, Missouri, United States	
Loss	30–17	Luiz Firmino	Decision (unanimous)	CFA 08: Araujo vs. Bradley	October 6, 2012	3	5:00	Hollywood, Florida, United States	
Win	30–16	Sean Wilson	TKO (punches)	C3 Fights: Rumble at Red Rock	August 18, 2012	2	1:51	Red Rock, Oklahoma, United States	
Loss	29–16	Patricky Freire	KO (flying knee and punches)	Bellator 39	April 2, 2011	1	2:53	Newkirk, Oklahoma, United States	Bellator Season Four Lightweight Tournament Semifinal.
Win	29–15	Josh Shockley	Submission (armbar)	Bellator 36	March 12, 2011	1	1:36	Shreveport, Louisiana, United States	Bellator Season Four Lightweight Tournament Quarterfinal.
Win	28–15	Ludwing Salazar	Submission (armbar)	Fite Nite 14	November 9, 2010	2	1:49	San José, Costa Rica	
Loss	27–15	Pat Curran	Decision (split)	Bellator 21	June 10, 2010	3	5:00	Hollywood, Florida, United States	Bellator Season Two Lightweight Tournament Final.
Win	27–14	Carey Vanier	Submission (armbar)	Bellator 17	May 6, 2010	2	3:33	Boston, Massachusetts, United States	Bellator Season Two Lightweight Tournament Semifinal.
Win	26–14	James Krause	Submission (armbar)	Bellator 14	April 15, 2010	2	2:44	Chicago, Illinois, United States	Bellator Season Two Lightweight Tournament Quarterfinal.
Win	25–14	Daisuke Hanazawa	KO (punch)	KOTC: Toryumon	January 30, 2010	2	0:29	Okinawa Prefecture, Japan	
Loss	24–14	Eddie Alvarez	Submission (rear-naked choke)	Bellator 12	June 19, 2009	2	0:38	Hollywood, Florida, United States	Bellator Season One Lightweight Tournament Final; For Bellator Lightweight Championship.
Win	24–13	Jorge Masvidal	Technical Submission (inverted triangle choke)	Bellator 5	May 1, 2009	3	3:22	Dayton, Ohio, United States	Bellator Season One Lightweight Tournament Semifinal; Submission of the Year (2009).
Win	23–13	Alonzo Martinez	Submission (rear-naked choke)	Bellator 1	April 3, 2009	1	3:26	Hollywood, Florida, United States	Bellator Season One Lightweight Tournament Quarterfinal.
Win	22–13	Jason Meaders	TKO (corner stoppage)	UnleashedFIGHT	October 11, 2008	1	5:00	Alpine, California, United States	
Win	21–13	Shad Smith	TKO (punches)	Total Combat: Nevada	May 10, 2008	1	2:25	Laughlin, Nevada, United States	Defended Total Combat Lightweight Championship; Smith tested positive for marijuana
Win	20–13	Preston Scharf	TKO (submission to punches)	Total Combat 26	February 16, 2008	1	4:29	San Diego, California, United States	Defended the Total Combat Lightweight Championship.
Win	19–13	David Gardner	Submission (rear-naked choke)	Total Combat 22	August 3, 2007	2	N/A	San Diego, California, United States	Won the Total Combat Lightweight Championship.
Win	18–13	Zach Light	Submission (armbar)	Total Combat 21	June 8, 2007	1	2:35	San Diego, California, United States	Welterweight bout.
Win	17–13	Randy Velarde	Submission (armbar)	KOTC: Caged Chaos	March 10, 2007	2	2:23	Laughlin, Nevada, United States	
Loss	16–13	João Cunha	Submission (armbar)	Cage of Fire 5	January 27, 2007	2	2:30	Tijuana, Mexico	
Win	16–12	Brandon Adamson	TKO (cut)	TC 18: Nightmare	November 4, 2006	1	3:00	San Diego, California, United States	
Win	15–12	Danny Affleje	KO (punches)	Proving Ground	October 21, 2006	1	N/A	Yuma, Arizona, United States	
Loss	14–12	Tetsuji Kato	TKO (punches)	FFCF 6: Undisputed	June 21, 2006	1	0:13	Mangilao, Guam	
Loss	14–11	Hermes França	Submission (armbar)	TC 14: Throwdown	May 13, 2006	1	0:53	Del Mar, California, United States	Return to Lightweight.
Win	14–10	Akbarh Arreola	Decision (unanimous)	Total Combat 12	December 13, 2005	3	5:00	Tijuana, Mexico	
Win	13–10	Jerimiah Carson	TKO (punches)	Total Combat 11	December 10, 2005	2	N/A	Yuma, Arizona, United States	
Loss	12–10	Jake Shields	Decision (unanimous)	Kage Kombat	November 12, 2005	3	5:00	California, United States	
Win	12–9	Tim Carey	Submission (rear-naked choke)	Total Combat 10	October 15, 2005	1	2:25	San Diego, California, United States	
Win	11–9	Akbarh Arreola	TKO (corner stoppage)	Total Combat 9	July 30, 2005	2	5:00	Tijuana, Mexico	
Loss	10–9	Cassio Werneck	Submission (triangle choke)	WEC 15	May 19, 2005	2	2:54	Lemoore, California, United States	Return to Welterweight.
Loss	10–8	Antonio McKee	Decision (unanimous)	Ultimate Cage Fighting 1	May 9, 2002	2	5:00	Los Angeles, California, United States	Lightweight bout.
Loss	10–7	Jason Miller	Decision	Xtreme Pankration 2	April 12, 2002	2	5:00	Los Angeles, California, United States	
Loss	10–6	Dennis Asche	Submission (triangle choke)	IFC: Warriors Challenge 12	April 11, 2001	2	3:42	Friant, California, United States	Middleweight debut.
Loss	10–5	Joe Stevenson	Decision	KOTC 3: Knockout Nightmare	April 15, 2000	2	5:00	San Jacinto, California, United States	Lightweight bout.
Win	10–4	Sean McCaan	Submission (armbar)	IFC: Warriors Challenge 6	March 25, 2000	1	2:51	Friant, California, United States	
Loss	9–4	Dave Strasser	Submission (armbar)	Neutral Grounds 13	November 20, 1999	1	N/A	Lakeside, California, United States	Neutral Grounds 13 Four-Man Tournament Final.
Win	9–3	David Harris	Decision (unanimous)	Neutral Grounds 13	November 20, 1999	3	5:00	Lakeside, California, United States	Return to Welterweight; Neutral Grounds 13 Four-Man Tournament Semifinal.
Win	8–3	Brennan Kamaka	Submission (armbar)	Rage in the Cage 2	October 15, 1999	1	6:00	Honolulu, Hawaii, United States	Lightweight bout.
Win	7–3	Ken Tonaria	Submission (armbar)	Ready to Rumble	October 13, 1999	N/A	N/A	Woodland Hills, California, United States	
Loss	6–3	Steve Heath	Decision (unanimous)	Extreme Challenge 27	September 18, 1999	2	5:00	Fresno, California, United States	Light Heavyweight debut.
Loss	6–2	Adrian Serrano	TKO (corner stoppage)	Extreme Challenge 27	August 21, 1999	2	5:00	Davenport, Iowa, United States	Welterweight debut.
Win	6–1	Jason Von Flue	Submission (armbar)	IFC: Warriors Challenge 4	August 7, 1999	2	5:08	Jackson, California, United States	
Win	5–1	Johnny Molano	Submission (triangle armbar)	Kage Kombat 18	May 28, 1999	1	4:03	United States	
Win	4–1	Thiago De Fritas	Submission (heel hook)	Neutral Grounds 12	May 28, 1999	1	N/A	United States	
Win	3–1	Giovanni Francioso	Submission (armbar)	Neutral Grounds 11	March 31, 1999	1	5:01	Los Angeles, California, United States	
Win	2–1	Ken Kellenberger	Submission (rear-naked choke)	Neutral Grounds 9	January 10, 1999	1	0:45	United States	
Loss	1–1	Jason Dallas	TKO (punches)	Neutral Grounds 6	August 2, 1998	1	N/A	United States	Neutral Grounds 6 Four-Man Tournament Final.
Win	1–0	Lee Cox	Submission (armbar)	Neutral Grounds 6	August 2, 1998	1	N/A	United States	Neutral Grounds 6 Four-Man Tournament Semifinal.

== Kickboxing and shootboxing record ==
Kickboxing record
5 wins (2 (T)KOs, 3 decisions), 3 losses, 0 draws
Result	Record	Opponent	Method	Event	Date	Round	Time	Location
Win	5-3	(Iran) Mostafa Abdollahi	Decision (majority)	Shoot Boxing World Tournament 2012	November 17, 2012	3	3:00	(Japan) Tokyo
Win	4-3	(Japan) Satoru Suzuki	KO (front choke)	Shoot Boxing 2012 - Act 3	June 3, 2012	2	3:00	(Japan) Tokyo
Loss	3-3	(Netherlands) Andy Souwer	Decision (unanimous)	Shoot the Shooto 2011	October 9, 2011	3	3:00	(Japan) Bunkyō, Tokyo
Loss	3-2	(Thailand) Bovy Sor Udomson	Decision (unanimous)	Shootboxing 2011 - Act 4	September 10, 2011	3	3:00	(Japan) Koto, Tokyo
Win	3-1	(Japan) Hiroki Shishido	Decision (unanimous)	Shootboxing 2011 - Act 3	June 5, 2011	3	3:00	(Japan) Bunkyō, Tokyo
Loss	2-1	(Thailand) Buakaw Por. Pramuk	TKO (leg kicks)	S-Cup 2010	November 23, 2010	2	2:29	(Japan) Bunkyō, Tokyo
Shoot Boxing World Tournament 2010 Final
Win	2-0	(Netherlands) Andy Souwer	Decision (split)	S-Cup 2010	November 23, 2010	3	3:00	(Japan) Bunkyō, Tokyo
Shoot Boxing World Tournament 2010 Semifinal
Win	1-0	(Japan) Takaaki Umeno	KO (uppercut)	S-Cup 2010	November 23, 2010	3	3:00	(Japan) Bunkyō, Tokyo
Shoot Boxing World Tournament 2010 Quarterfinal
Legend: Win Loss Draw/no contest Notes

== Submission grappling record ==
Result	Opponent	Method	Event	Date	Round	Time	Notes
Loss	(Brazil) Ricardo Morais	Choke	1998 ADCC World Championships	March 20, 1998	1	9:22	
Loss	(Russia) Karimula Barkalaev	Choke	1998 ADCC World Championships	March 20, 1998	1	3:05	
Win	(Palestine Liberation Organization) Lafee Al Ajloony	Shoulder Injury	1998 ADCC World Championships	March 20, 1998	1	3:46	
