= K-1 World MAX 2005 Championship final =

K-1 martial arts event in 2005

K-1 World MAX 2005 Championship Final
- Promotion: K-1
- Date: July 20, 2005
- Venue: Yokohama Arena
- City: Yokohama, Japan
- Attendance: 17,720

Event chronology
K-1 Challenge 2005 Xplosion X	K-1 World MAX 2005 Championship Final	K-1 World Grand Prix 2005 in Hawaii

K-1 World MAX 2005 Championship Final was a kickboxing event promoted by the K-1 organization. It was the fourth K-1 World MAX final for middleweight kickboxers (70 kg/152 lb weight class), involving eight finalists and two reserve fighters, with all bouts fought under K-1 rules. All eight of the finalists had won elimination fights at the K-1 World MAX 2005 World Tournament Open, while the reserve fighters were invited despite suffering defeats. As well as tournament matches there were also three super fights fought under K-1 rules (70 kg/152 lb weight class). In total there were sixteen fighters at the event, representing nine countries.

The tournament winner was shoot boxing standout Andy Souwer who defeated reigning champion and tournament favorite Buakaw Por. Pramuk by split decision in a grueling final that went into two extension rounds. Souwer was helped in his route to the final by the fact that local hero (and one of the favorites) Masato was injured in his quarter final match and replaced by the much less renowned Yasuhiro Kazuya, who had suffered a cut in his reserve match win, something Souwer took full advantage of, winning by technical knockout. In the super fights the most notable result saw legendary Muay Thai champion Ramon Dekkers outclass former K-1 USA winner Duane Ludwig, winning via a wide unanimous decision. The event was held in Yokohama, Japan at the Yokohama Arena on Wednesday, July 20, 2005.

== K-1 World MAX 2005 Championship Final Tournament ==
K-1 World MAX Open
(South Korea) Chi Bin Lim
(Japan) Masato	DEC
(Japan) Norifumi Yamamoto
(Greece) Mike Zambidis	KO
(Japan) Takayuki Kohiruimaki	KO
(Lithuania) Darius Skliaudys
(Brazil) Marfio Canoletti
(Netherlands) Andy Souwer	DEC
(South Africa) Virgil Kalakoda
(Netherlands) Albert Kraus	DEC
(New Zealand) Shane Chapman
(Australia) John Wayne Parr	KO
(Mongolia) Jadamba Narantungalag	DEC
(Japan) Yasuhiro Kazuya
(Thailand) Buakaw Por.Pramuk	DEC
(Belarus) Vasily Shish

Quarter Finals
(Japan) Masato	DEC
(Greece) Mike Zambidis
(Japan) Takayuki Kohiruimaki
(Netherlands) Andy Souwer	DEC
(Netherlands) Albert Kraus	DEC
(Australia) John Wayne Parr
(Mongolia) Jadamba Narantungalag
(Thailand) Buakaw Por.Pramuk	DEC

Semi Finals
(Japan) Kazuya Yasuhiro *
(Netherlands) Andy Souwer	TKO
(Netherlands) Albert Kraus
(Thailand) Buakaw Por.Pramuk	DEC

Final
(Netherlands) Andy Souwer	DEC
(Thailand) Buakaw Por.Pramuk

* Reserve Fight Kazuya Yasuhiro replaced Masato who had to withdraw from the competition due to injury

== Results ==
K-1 World MAX 2005 Championship Final Results
Super Fight 1 –70 kg: K-1 Rules / 3Min. 3R
(Japan) Akeomi Nitta def. Kotetsu Boku (Japan)
Nitti defeated Boku by 3rd Round Unanimous Decision 3-0 (29-28, 30-28, 30-28).
K-1 World MAX Tournament Reserve Fight -70 kg: K-1 Rules / 3Min. 3R Ext.1R
(Japan) Yasuhiro Kazuya def. Darius Skliaudys (Lithuania)
Kazuya defeated Skliaudys by 2nd Round Unanimous Decision 3-0 (20-19, 20-19, 20-19). The match was stopped in the 2nd Round due to cut suffered by Yasuhiro and the bout went to the judges score cards.
K-1 World MAX Tournament Quarter Finals -70 kg: K-1 Rules / 3Min. 3R Ext.1R
(Japan) Masato def. Mike Zambidis (Greece)
Masato defeated Zambidis by 3rd Round Unanimous Decision 3-0 (30-28, 30-28, 29-28) but had to withdraw from the competition due to a fractured ankle - his place was taken by reserve fight winner Kazuya Yasuhiro.
(Netherlands) Andy Souwer def. Takayuki Kohiruimaki (Japan)
Souwer defeated Kohiruimaki by 3rd Round Majority Decision 2-0 (30-28, 30-29, 30-30).
(Netherlands) Albert Kraus def. John Wayne Parr (Australia)
Kraus defeated Parr by 3rd Round Unanimous Decision 3-0 (30-29, 30-29, 30-29).
(Thailand) Buakaw Por. Pramuk def. Jadamba Narantungalag (Mongolia)
Por. Pramuk defeated Narantungalag by 3rd Round Majority Decision 2-0 (30-28, 30-30, 30-27).
Super Fight 2 –70 kg: K-1 Rules / 3Min. 3R Ext.2R
(Netherlands) Ramon Dekkers def. Duane Ludwig (United States)
Dekkers defeated Ludwig by 3rd Round Unanimous Decision 3-0 (30-24, 30-24, 30-25).
K-1 World MAX Tournament Semi Finals -70 kg: K-1 Rules / 3Min. 3R Ext.1R
(Netherlands) Andy Souwer def. Yasuhiro Kazuya (Japan)
Souwer defeated Kazuya by TKO (Referee Stoppage, Cut) at 2:24 of the 1st Round.
(Thailand) Buakaw Por. Pramuk def. Albert Kraus (Netherlands)
Por. Pramuk defeated Kraus by 3rd Round Unanimous Decision 3-0 (30-28, 30-28, 30-28).
Super Fight 3 –70 kg: K-1 Rules / 3Min. 3R Ext.2R
(South Africa) Virgil Kalakoda def. Yoshihiro Sato (Japan)
Kalakoda defeated Sato by 3rd Round Majority Decision 2-0 (30-29, 30-29, 29-29).
K-1 World MAX Tournament Final -70 kg: K-1 Rules / 3Min. 3R Ext.2R
(Netherlands) Andy Souwer def. Buakaw Por. Pramuk (Thailand)
Souwer defeated Por. Pramuk by 2nd Extra Round Split Decision 2-1 (10-9, 10-9, 9-10). After 3 rounds it was scored a Decision Draw 0-0 (30-30, 30-30, 30-30), while the 1st Extra round was scored a Decision Draw 0-0 (10-10, 10-10, 10-10).

== See also ==
- List of K-1 events
- List of K-1 champions
- List of male kickboxers
