= Andy Ologun =

Nigerian martial artist

- Born: June 12, 1983 (age 43); Ibadan, Nigeria
- Height: 5 ft 11 1/2 in (1.82 m)
- Weight: 164 lb (74 kg; 11.7 st)
- Division: Welterweight; Lightweight
- Style: Kickboxing, Wrestling
- Stance: Orthodox
- Fighting out of: Saitama, Saitama, Japan
- Team: Team Ologun; Grabaka; Hiranaka Boxing School Gym
- Rank: Blue belt in Brazilian Jiu-Jitsu
- Years active: 2006–2011

Professional boxing record
- Total: 3
- Wins: 1
- By knockout: 1
- Losses: 2
- By knockout: 1

Kickboxing record
- Total: 8
- Wins: 2
- Losses: 6
- Draws: 0

Mixed martial arts record
- Total: 4
- Wins: 3
- By knockout: 1
- By decision: 2
- Losses: 1
- By submission: 1

Other information
- Notable relatives: Bobby Ologun (brother)
- Boxing record from BoxRec
- Mixed martial arts record from Sherdog

Andy Ologun (born June 12, 1983) is a Nigerian professional boxer, mixed martial artist, kickboxer and actor who has fought for K-1 and DREAM. He is the younger brother of television personality and mixed martial artist, Bobby Ologun.

Ologun holds a notable K-1 kickboxing win over Takayuki Kohiruimaki and a win at Dynamite!! 2010 against former pro baseball Yokohama DeNA BayStars player turned mixed martial artist Katsuaki Furuki. Ologun most notably fought Thai kickboxer Buakaw Por. Pramuk at K-1 World MAX 2007 World Elite Showcase, a fight Ologun lost via decision. Later same year Ologun fought 2 times and reigning K-1 champion Andy Souwer at SHOOT BOXING BATTLE SUMMIT GROUND ZERO TOKYO. Ologun managed to score a first round knockdown on Souwer and also damaged Souwer's nose and bleed the opponent. However Souwer caught up later and dominated Ologun in second & third round to secure a decision win. Andy was to have a rematch with Buakaw Por. Pramuk in 2010, but the fight was delayed due to scheduling conflicts.

Andy is also popular in Japan for his fashion modeling, having modeled in Japan for Comme des Garçons, Sean John, Puma, Dior and Michael Kors, as well as several appearances on Japanese television programs SASUKE and Ninja Warrior. He was also a film extra in the movies Babel, Catch a Fire and Inception. Ologun also made a cameo appearance in a Buju Banton music video. As of 2010 his current K-1 kickboxing record is 2-5.

Ologun turned to professional boxing in mid-2011. Fighting out of Hiranaka Boxing School Gym, he made his debut with a second-round technical knockout in a 163-pound bout at the Nippon Budokan in Tokyo.

== Mixed martial arts record ==
Professional record breakdown
4 matches	3 wins	1 loss
By knockout	1	0
By submission	0	1
By decision	2	0

Res.	Record	Opponent	Method	Event	Date	Round	Time	Location	Notes
Win	3–1	Katsuaki Furuki	Decision (unanimous)	Dynamite!! 2010	December 31, 2010	3	5:00	Saitama, Japan	
Win	2–1	Yukio Sakaguchi	KO (punches)	Fields Dynamite!! 2008	December 31, 2008	1	3:52	Saitama, Japan	
Loss	1–1	Daisuke Nakamura	Submission (flying armbar)	Dream 5: Lightweight Grand Prix 2008 Final Round	July 21, 2008	1	3:41	Osaka, Japan	
Win	1–0	Ken Kaneko	Decision (unanimous)	K-1 Premium Dynamite!! 2006	December 31, 2006	3	5:00	Osaka, Japan	

== Kickboxing record ==
2 Wins - 5 Losses - 0 Draw
Date	Result	Record	Opponent	Event	Method	Round Time
2/23/2009	Loss	2-6	(Japan) Takayuki Kohiruimaki	K-1 World MAX 2009 Japan Tournament	3R Decision (29-28, 29-28, 28-28)	Round 3
2/2/2008	Loss	2-5	(Japan) Yasuhiro Kido	K-1 World MAX 2008 Japan Tournament	3R Decision	Round 3
2/2/2008	Win	2-4	(Japan) Yuya Yamamoto	K-1 World MAX 2008 Japan Tournament	3R Decision	Round 3
10/28/2007	Loss	1-4	(Netherlands) Andy Souwer	SHOOT BOXING BATTLE SUMMIT GROUND ZERO	3R Decision	Round 3
6/28/2007	Loss	1-3	(Japan) Tatsuji	K-1 World MAX 2007 World Tournament Final Elimination	3R Decision	Round 3
6/04/2007	Loss	1-2	(Thailand) Buakaw Por.Pramuk	K-1 World MAX 2007 World Elite Showcase	3R Decision	Round 3
5/02/2007	Win	1-1	(Japan) Takayuki Kohiruimaki	K-1 World MAX 2007 Japan Tournament	3R Decision	Round 3
4/9/2006	Loss	0-1	(Japan) Kazuya Yasuhiro	K-1 World MAX 2006 Champions Challenge	3R Decision (29-28, 29-29, 30-28)	Round 3
