= Buakaw Banchamek =

Thai kickboxer (born 1982)

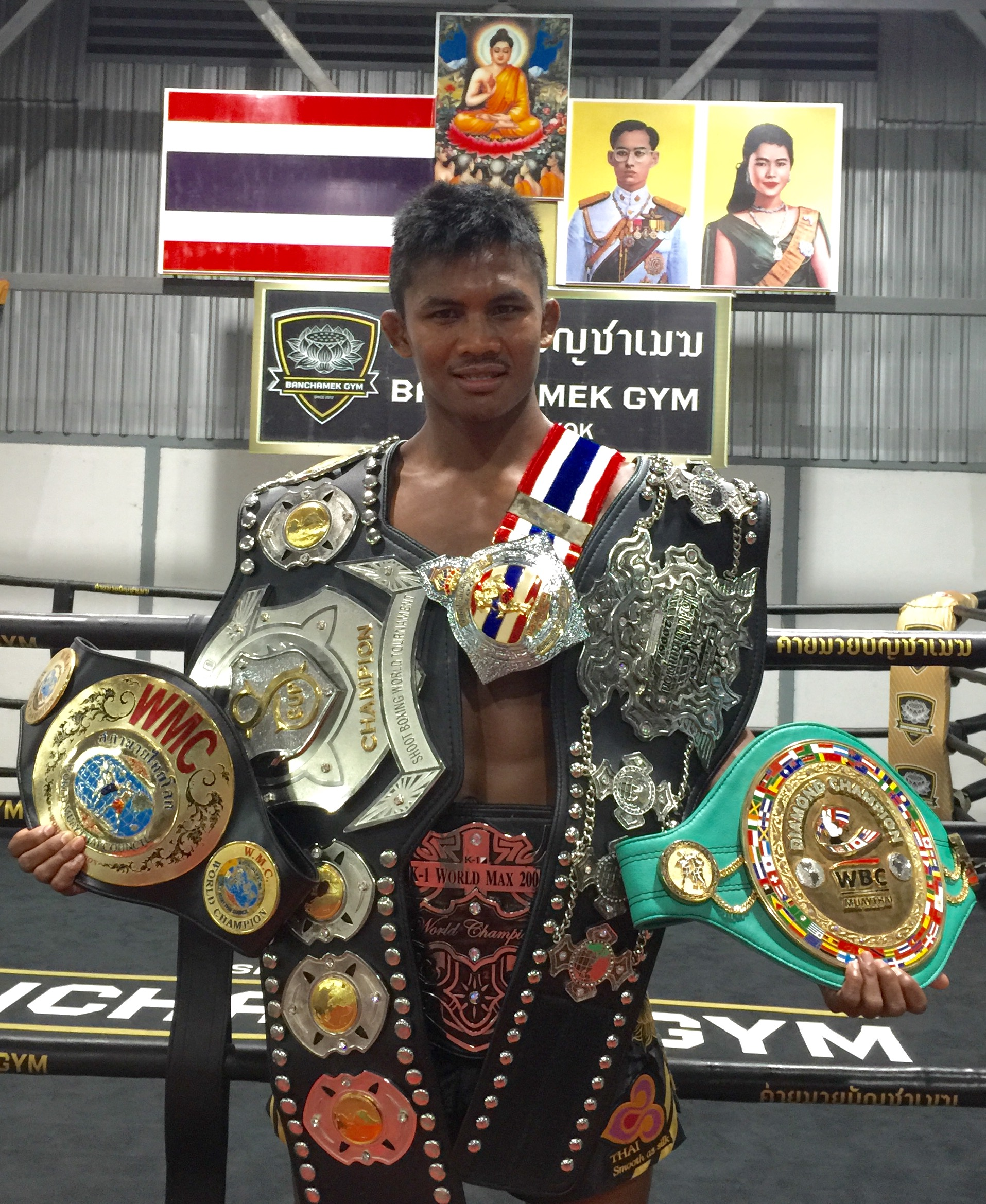
- Buakaw in 2015
- Born: Sombat Banchamek; May 8, 1982 (age 44); Ban Song Nong County, Samrong Thap, Surin, Thailand
- Native name: บัวขาว บัญชาเมฆ
- Other names: Buakaw Por.Pramuk (บัวขาว ป. ประมุข); The White Lotus; Black Gold
- Height: 1.74 m (5 ft 8 1/2 in)
- Weight: 71.5 kg (158 lb; 11.26 st)
- Division: Featherweight; Lightweight; Welterweight; Middleweight
- Style: Muay Thai (Muay Tae), Kickboxing
- Stance: Orthodox
- Fighting out of: Surin, Thailand
- Team: Por. Pramuk Gym (1997–2012); Banchamek Gym (2012–present)
- Trainer: Lt. Teerawat Yioyim
- Rank: Captain, Royal Thai Army
- Years active: 1990–present

Kickboxing record
- Total: 287
- Wins: 246
- By knockout: 74
- Losses: 25
- Draws: 14
- No contests: 2

Other information
- Notable students: Superbon Banchamek
- Website: www.banchamekgym.com
- Last updated on: June 16, 2017

Sombat Banchamek (Thai: สมบัติ บัญชาเมฆ, born May 8, 1982), also known by his ring name Buakaw Banchamek (Thai: บัวขาว บัญชาเมฆ, Buakaw meaning "white lotus") and mononymously as Buakaw, is a Thai professional Muay Thai fighter and kickboxer. Known for his fierce fighting style, he is regarded as one of the greatest Muay Thai fighters of all time.

His time at Por Pramuk gym, which started in 1997, saw him collect several belts and championships. He won the featherweight title at Omnoi Stadium, and would later take the lightweight belt at Omnoi. In late 2002, he won the highly-regarded Toyota Marathon at 140lbs which was held at Lumpini Stadium. He entered the Japanese fighting promotion K-1 Max in 2004. Banchamek won the tournament in 2004 defeating John Wayne Parr and Masato Kobayashi. In 2006, he gained the K-1 Max belt for a second time. The marketing of K-1 and its promotion on the international stage saw Banchamek become a household name in his home country and abroad. After his time with K-1, Banchamek became the Shoot Boxing S-Cup Champion in 2010. He also participated in Max Muay Thai fights and in 2012 and 2011 was the Thai Fight Tournament Champion.

Apart from his competitive career, Banchamek has also been an ambassador for Muay Thai, actively promoting the sport and helping it gain recognition on the global stage. In 2023, he led the largest Wai Kru performance, setting a Guinness World Record. He has also embarked on an acting career, starring in the Thai action films Yamada: The Samurai of Ayothaya (2010) and Thong Dee Fun Khao (2017).

== Biography and career ==
=== Early career ===
Born Sombat Banchamek (Thai: สมบัติ บัญชาเมฆ) in Surin, Thailand, Buakaw started his fighting career at the age of eight in his home province of Surin in the northeastern Thailand. He moved to Chachoengsao when he was 15 and trained with the Por. Pramuk Gym. His first fight name was Damtamin Kiat-anan.

Buakaw has collected several belts to his name fighting in Bangkok. The Omnoi Stadium featherweight title was his first belt. After that, he would go on to take the featherweight champion of Thailand title. Buakaw then proceeded to win another Omnoi Stadium title belt, this time in the lightweight division. In December 2002, Buakaw won the Toyota Marathon 140 lb. tournament at Lumpinee Boxing Stadium, beating the highly regarded Satoshi Kobayashi of Japan in the finals.

=== K-1 ===
In July 2004, Buakaw became the K-1 World MAX 2004 champion beating John Wayne Parr, Takayuki Kohiruimaki and previous champion Masato in the finals. In 2005, he nearly repeated his run for tournament champion but lost the extra round in a controversial decision to Dutch shoot-boxer Andy Souwer in the finals. In the K-1 World MAX 2006, Buakaw again faced Andy Souwer in the finals but this time defeated Souwer by TKO with a flurry of punches; thereby winning his second K-1 World MAX title and becoming the first man to win such title twice.

Buakaw lost to Masato by unanimous decision at the K-1 World MAX 2007 quarterfinals. Despite Buakaw being able to land vicious leg kicks throughout the match, Masato scored a knockdown in the first round and continued to land numerous punch combinations throughout the fight which earned him a unanimous decision victory.

In 2010, Buakaw co-starred in the martial arts movie Yamada: The Samurai of Ayothaya based on the life of Yamada Nagamasa, a Japanese adventurer who gained considerable influence in Thailand at the beginning of the 17th century and became the governor of the Nakhon Si Thammarat province in southern Thailand.

Although Buakaw was a semi-finalist of the K-1 World MAX 2009 Final Buakaw did not compete in the K-1 World MAX 2010 in Seoul World Championship Tournament Final 16 because he was displeased with the K-1 official's biased decision. Instead he entered the Shoot Boxing World Tournament 2010 along with the former three time tournament champion Andy Souwer. However Toby Imada defeated Souwer in the semi-finals to face Buakaw in the final. Buakaw defeated Imada via TKO in the second round to become the new 2010 Shoot Boxing S-Cup World champion.

=== Thai Fight ===
In 2011, Buakaw had seven fights; four of which ended by way of stoppage. In the semi-finals of the 2011 Thai Fight 70 kg Tournament, he won by KO in the 3rd round via elbow against Mickael Piscitello. On December 18, 2011, he fought Frank Giorgi for the 2011 Thai Fight 70 kg Tournament Title and won by unanimous decision.

In the same year, Buakaw was signed as a sponsored fighter by Yokkao founder, Phillip Villa. He led the Muay Thai Combat Fan Expo to showcase the sport in Rimini Italy with Saenchai, Sudsakorn Sor Klinmee, Dzhabar Askerov and many others.

=== Leaving Por. Pramuk, retirement and comeback ===
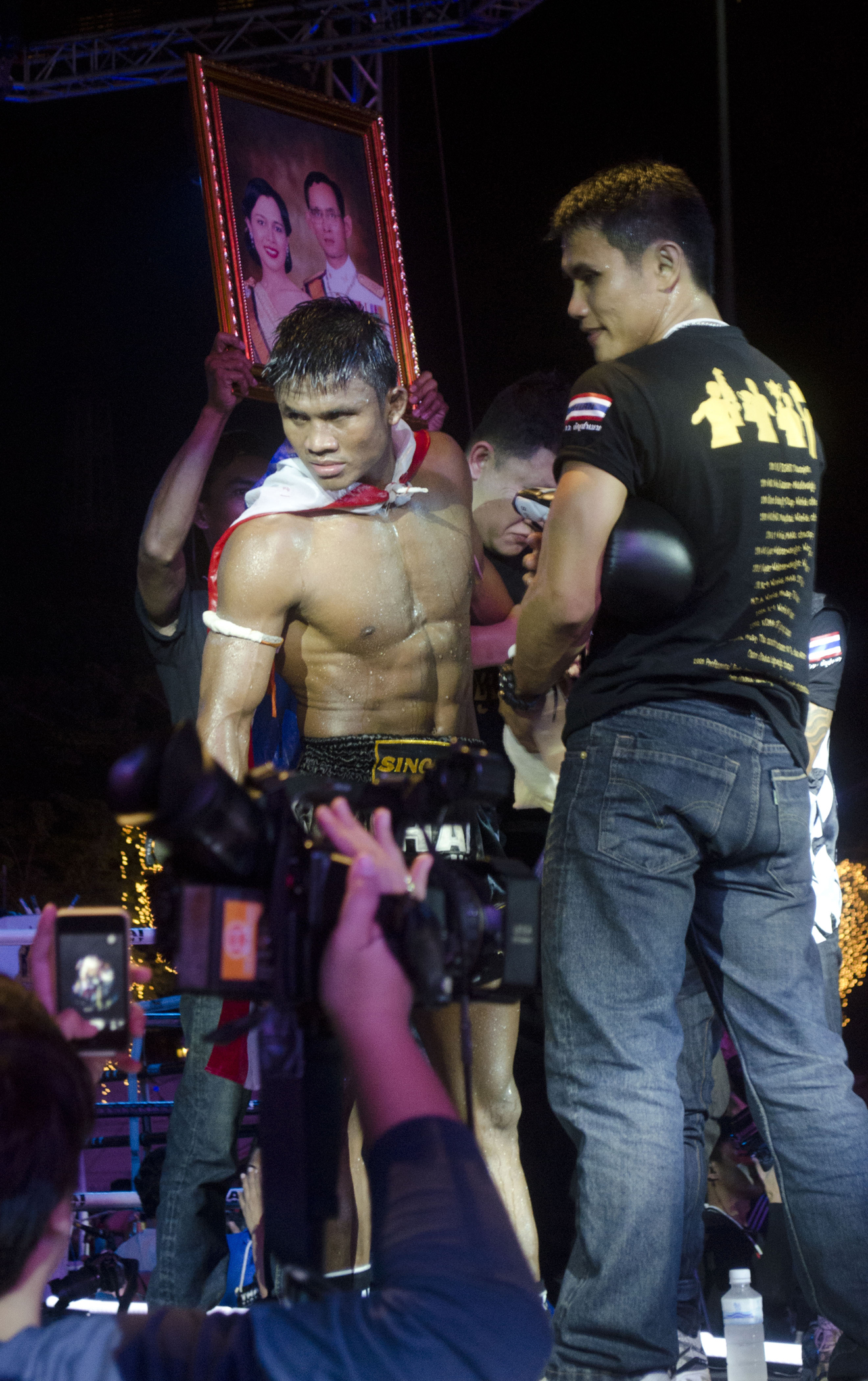
Buakaw, December 2012

On January 21, 2012, Buakaw headlined Yokkao Extreme 2012 in Milan Italy in front of 12,000 attendees. He defeated Dzhabar Askerov by points in the main event.

On March 1, 2012, he was notably absent from his training camp. On March 12, he appeared on a Thai TV talk show to apologize to the fans and explain his disappearance, stating that he had recurring problems in Por. Pramuk Gym since 2009 and felt insulted by the behavior of the management there. He had been scheduled to visit Japan with the Prime Minister Yingluck Shinawatra for an exhibition match but it was canceled in favor of another fight. As a result of the complication, he decided to part ways with the gym. He said "I can stand tough training, but not poor treatment. It is about the mind, not the body."

On March 17, 2012, Buakaw's sponsor Yokkao Boxing announced that he would return to training. It was at this time that they began referring to him as Buakaw Banchamek. He had resumed training at the "newly-built" Banchamek gym (named after him), as of March 22, 2012. He was scheduled to fight Mickael Cornubet at ThaiFight on April 17, 2012.

On March 30, 2012, Buakaw was prevented from fighting at Thai Fight in April 2012, until he filed a complaint with the Sports Authority of Thailand proving his claims of unfair treatment by Por. Pramuk. On April 4, he said that his fight name for the fight later that month would be "Buakaw", and that he "may not use the name of the boxing camp Por. Pramuk."

Buakaw's first fight after leaving Por Pramuk Gym was a success. He knocked out Rustem Zaripov at 2:45 of the 2nd round with accurate punches. On May 31, 2012, Buakaw told the press that he wanted to end the dispute between him and Por. Pramuk Gym. For a time, Buakaw was seen in jiujitsu, judo, and wrestling classes. An MMA career would have allowed Buakaw to fight without breaching his contract with the Por. Pramuk boxing camp. Nevertheless, Buakaw returned to the ring on August 17, 2012, when he defeated Abdoul Toure by way of TKO in round 2.

Buakaw beat Mauro Serra via TKO in the quarter-finals of the 2012 Thai Fight 70 kg Tournament at Thai Fight 2012: King of Muay Thai in Bangkok, Thailand, on October 23, 2012. He then defeated Tomoyuki Nishikawa by unanimous decision in the tournament semi-finals in Nakhon Ratchasima on November 25, 2012. He fought Vitaly Gurkov in the final on December 16, 2012, and won the Thai Fight tournament via decision.

On March 27, 2013, Buakaw faced his friend and teammate Harlee Avison in a staged exhibition match, which was free to the public, at the brand new Beeline Arena in Cambodia. On May 6, 2013, Buakaw again went off script to KO Malik Watson in round two in an exhibition match at MAX Muay Thai 1 in Surin, Thailand.

Buakaw made his return to legitimate fighting with a decision win over Dong Wen Fei in a three-round kickboxing match at MAX Muay Thai 3 in China on August 10, 2013. He re-signed with K-1 in August 2013 and returned with a first round body shot KO of David Calvo at the K-1 World MAX 2013 World Championship Tournament Final 16 in Mallorca, Spain, on September 14, 2013. In their fourth meeting, Buakaw bested Yoshihiro Sato on points at MAX Muay Thai 4 in Sendai, Japan, on October 6, 2013. He beat Enriko Kehl by decision at MAX Muay Thai 5: The Final Chapter in Khon Kaen, Thailand on December 10, 2013.

Buakaw defeated Zhou Zhi Peng on points after an extension round at the K-1 World MAX 2013 World Championship Tournament Quarter-finals - Part 1 in Foshan, China, on December 28, 2013. Zhou attempted to turn the fight into a brawl, and despite Buakaw doing enough to win the decision, the judges sent it to an extra round in which Buakaw suffered a cut from a head butt. In spite of this, Buakaw was able to establish dominance to take the fight and advance in the tournament. At the K-1 World MAX 2013 World Championship Tournament Final 4 in Baku, Azerbaijan, on February 23, 2014, he beat Lee Sung-Hyun by unanimous decision in the semi-finals.

Buakaw beat Victor Nagbe via unanimous decision at Combat Banchamek in Surin, Thailand, on April 14, 2014. He knocked out Adaylton Parreira De Freitas in round two at Muay Thai in Macau on June 6, 2014. Buakaw was scheduled to fight Fabio Pinca for the vacant WMC World Junior Middleweight (-69.9 kg/154 lb) Championship at Monte Carlo Fighting Masters 2014 in Monte Carlo, Monaco, on June 14, 2014. However, Pinca was injured in a bout with Thongchai Sitsongpeenong in February and was replaced by Djime Coulibaly. Buakaw defeated Coulibaly via unanimous decision to take the belt.

Buakaw was initially set to rematch Enriko Kehl in the K-1 World MAX 2013 World Championship Tournament Final in Pattaya, Thailand, on 26 July 2014. However, the event was postponed due to the 2014 Thai coup d'état. On 12 October 2014 he lost to Kehl by forfeit in the K-1 World Max Final event in Pattaya.

Buakaw lost the TopKing World Series Semifinal Tournament (TK4) against Russian fighter Khayal Dzhaniev in a controversial decision. Many Muay Thai journalists have stated that Buakaw should have won the match. Buakaw also suffered from deep cuts in his head inflicted by Khayal's elbows, while Khayal suffered broken ribs. Khayal was later hospitalized upon being forced to forfeit the final match that same night.

=== 2017 ===
==== Kunlun Fight 2017 ====
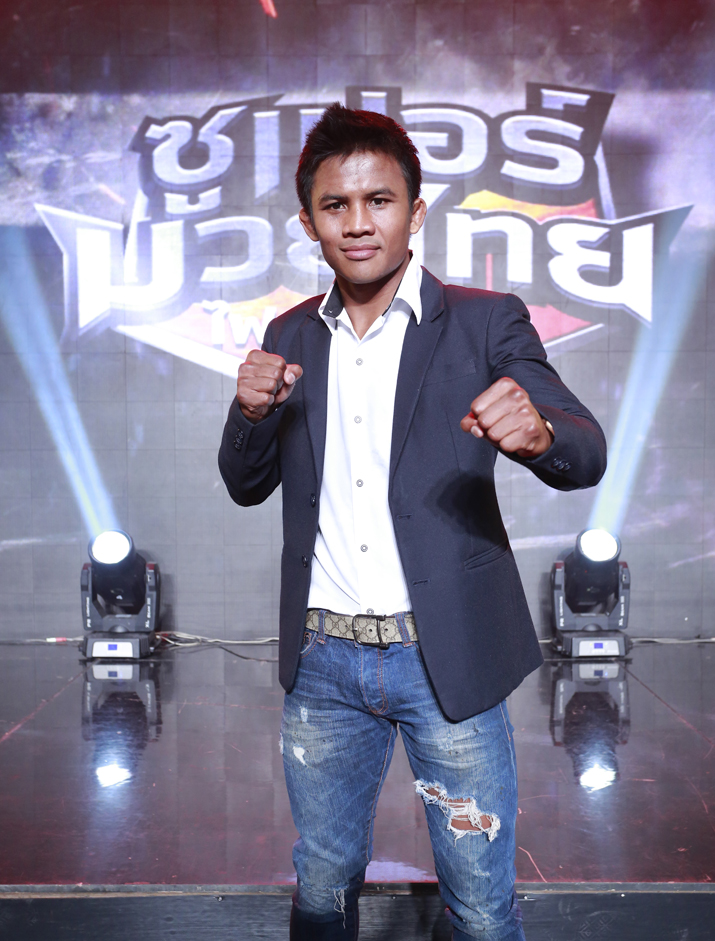
Buakaw Banchamek in 2016

Buakaw fought Chinese fighter Kong Lingfeng in the main event at Kunlun Fight 62 on June 10, 2017, in Bangkok, Thailand. He won the fight by decision.

Buakaw was expected to headline the debut of Kunlun Fight in France on November 11 in Paris. The event didn't happen and Buakaw fought in China at Kunlun Fight 67 where he knocked out Dutch Marouan Toutouh in the second round with punches.

==== All Star Fight ====
Buakaw defeated French Azize Hlali by knockout in the first round in the headline bout at All Star Fight on August 20, 2017, in Bangkok, Thailand.

On September 30 Buakaw scored the decision against Sergey Kuliaba of Ukraine at All Star Fight 2 in Bangkok.

On December 10 Buakaw was expected to fight Fabio Pinca at All Star Fight 3 held in Paris, but the Frenchman pulled out after suffering the knockout defeat against Uzbekistan's Anvar Boynazarov at Glory 47 Lyon on October 28, 2017.

=== 2018 ===
Buakaw faced Nayanesh Ayman in China at Kunlun Fight 69 on February 4, 2018, where he won via first-round knockout.

Buakaw is expected to challenge Spanish Jonay Risco for 70 kg title on March 9, 2018, at Enfusion kickboxing promotion in Abu Dhabi.

Buakaw fought Portuguese Luis Passos on 28 of April 2018 on All Star Fight 3 in Bangkok Thailand where he won via unanimous decision.

He fought three more times in 2018 on All Star Fight events held in Hong Kong, Prague and Pattaya respectively. He won on all three occasions by points.

=== 2019 ===
Buakaw headlined All Star Fight: World Soldier on March 9, 2019, in Bangkok Thailand. The show was organized in partnership with the Royal Thai Army to promote the national sport of Muay Thai as well as the fighters, several of whom are soldiers including Buakaw. He fought against Russian kickboxer, Artem Pashporin and won by unanimous decision.

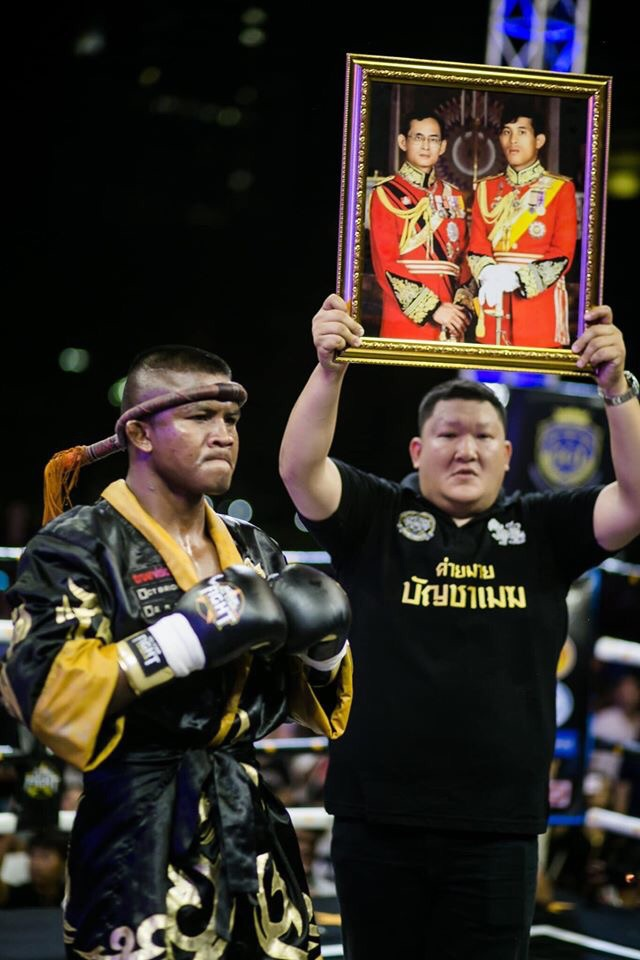
Buakaw in 2020

Buakaw was scheduled to face Chris Ngimbi at MAS Fight Muay Thai under MAS Fight rules (1 round of 9 minutes) on October 27, 2019, in Phnom Penh, Cambodia. He defeated Ngimbi by technical knockout at 4:10 of the fight.

=== 2021 ===
In 2021, Buakaw was named the executive director for the Kickboxing Association of Thailand. He would serve as the manager for the Thailand national kickboxing team, leading them to 2 gold medals and 12 total medals at the 2021 SEA Games in Hanoi.

=== 2022 ===
After a nearly three-year-long hiatus, Buakaw made his return to competition against Dmitry Varats at World Fight Tournament in Phnom Penh, Cambodia on July 6, 2022. He won the fight via unanimous decision.

==== Exhibition matches at Rajadamnern Stadium ====
In 2022, Buakaw was named chairman of the Board of Development of Rajadamnern Stadium, where he would oversee the development of both Muay Thai and competition within the stadium.

That year, Buakaw also participated in a series of exhibition kickboxing matches that headlined the newly launched Rajadamnern World Series (RWS) promotion at Rajadamnern Stadium.

On August 19, 2022, Buakaw defeated Kota Miura by third-round knockout.

Buakaw was scheduled to face Yoshihiro Sato in a rematch of their K-1 World MAX 2008 quarter-final match, which he lost by knockout, on October 28, 2022. Buakaw went on to defeat Sato by first-round knockout in an exhibition match.

On December 9, 2022, Buakaw faced Ukrainian fighter Oleksandr Yefimenko. With neither fighter unable to produce a knockout after three rounds, the fight was declared a draw.

=== 2023 ===
On April 13, 2023, it was announced that Buakaw would be facing Rukiya Anpo at Rizin 42 on May 6, 2023. The fight was ruled a draw by unanimous decision. Two judges scored the bout an even 30–30, while the third ringside official awarded Anpo and Buakaw a round each for a 29–29 scorecard.

Buakaw faced Yasuhiro Kido in a kickboxing match at Legend of Rajadamnern: Last of the Generation on September 9, 2023. The bout ended in the second round after Buakaw accidentally headbutted Kido, opening a cut in his forehead, leading to a no contest.

Buakaw then faced Wang Yanlong at Grandview International Fight Super Competition on September 24, 2023. In the first round Yanlong hit Buakaw's groin several times, leading Buakaw to launch an assault of knees at Yanlong. Yanlong criticized the knees and refused to continue fighting, thus the bout was declared a no contest.

Buakaw was scheduled to face Nayanesh Ayman at Legend of Rajadamnern: The Revenge on December 2, 2023. Buakaw won the bout via unanimous decision.

=== 2024 ===
Buakaw faced Minoru Kimura at Rizin Landmark 9 on March 23, 2024. Buakaw defeated Kimura by second-round knockout.

==== Exhibition fight with Manny Pacquiao ====
Buakaw was initially expected to fight boxing legend Manny Pacquiao in an exhibition match in January 2024. On July 21, 2023, Pacquiao and Buakaw met in a press conference held in Bangkok, Thailand to promote their exhibition superfight in January 2024. However, on December 31, 2023, it was published that the bout will now take place on April 20, 2024. On March 9, 2024, the fight's promoter Fresh Air Festival announced that the fight would be further postponed from the original date of April 20. According to the promoter, discussions for a new date are still ongoing.

Their exhibition match is set to take place at a 155 lbs catchweight, and will be under the international boxing rules. The fight was scheduled for six three-minute rounds, with two-minute break in between rounds. According to the promoter of the event, the Pacquiao vs. Buakaw match has a total investment of $25 million.

==== K-1 World Max tournament ====
After the exhibition bout with Pacquiao was postponed, Buakaw entered the K-1 World MAX 2024 tournament, initially expected to face Ouyang Feng in the first round. However, Feng withdrew from the bout due to a rib injury. Buakaw ultimately faced the to-be tournament winner Stoyan Koprivlenski, losing via unanimous decision.

== Bare-knuckle boxing ==
=== Bare Knuckle Fighting Championship ===
On July 13, 2022, it was announced by David Feldman, president and founder of Bare Knuckle Fighting Championship, that Buakaw had signed a deal to fight for BKFC. He made his debut headlining BKFC Thailand 3: Moment of Truth on September 3, 2022, where he defeated Erkan Varol by first-round knockout.

On October 26, 2022, it was announced that Buakaw was scheduled to face Muay Thai legend Saenchai in a bare-knuckle Muay Thai bout in March 2023 at a BKFC event. In mid-February 2023, it was announced that due to legal implications regarding the use of the name muay thai in marketing material, the bout was indefinitely postponed and effectively canceled. In June 2023, BKFC Asia CEO Nick Chapman announced that the fight with Saenchai was on again, this time taking place at BKFC Thailand 5: Legends of Siam on November 5, 2023, with the bout promoted as a Special Rules Bare Knuckle Thai Fight. Buakaw won the fight by unanimous decision.

== Football career ==
Buakaw Banchamek
Personal information
- Height: 1.74 m (5 ft 9 in)
- Position: Forward

Team information
- Current team: RBAC
- Number: 16

Senior career*
Years	Team	Apps	(Gls)
2014–2015	RBAC	1	(0)
- * Club domestic league appearances and goals

=== RBAC ===
Buakaw enrolled in Rattana Bundit University's business administration, he graduated in 2016 . In February 2014, he signed for RBAC F.C., the association football club representing Rattana Bundit University, which plays in the Regional League Division 2 and is the reserve team of BEC Tero Sasana F.C., who plays in the Thai Premier League. Buakaw is a graduate in Bachelor of Business Administration from Rattana Bundit University (RBAC). Playing as a forward, he made his debut on February 16.

== Buakaw Village ==
He owns a resort-style development project called Buakaw Village in Mae Taeng, Chiang Mai province, Thailand. The project was founded in April 2018 after Banchamek Gym, previously located in Bangkok, was deemed incapable of handling the influx of Thais and foreigners who came to train at the gym. Its facilities include a Muay Thai gym, a restaurant, and bungalows that can be rented by people who come to train at the Muay Thai gym.

== Titles ==
=== Kickboxing ===
- K-1
  - 2014 K-1 Global/ K-1 Rising World MAX runner-up
  - 2006 K-1 World MAX Champion
  - 2005 K-1 World MAX runner-up
  - 2004 K-1 World MAX Champion
- Wu Lin Feng
  - 2015 Wu Lin Feng 70 kg World Championship

=== Muay Thai ===
- Rajadamnern Stadium
  - 2026 Rajadamnern Stadium Hall of Fame
- Omnoi Stadium
  - 2001 Omnoi Stadium Featherweight Champion
  - 2003 Omnoi Stadium Lightweight Champion
- Professional Boxing Association of Thailand
  - 2001 Thailand (PAT) Featherweight Champion
- Toyota Cup
  - 2002 Toyota Muay Thai Marathon Tournament 140 lbs Champion
- World Muaythai Council
  - 2014-2015 WMC Muaythai Junior Middleweight World Champion
  - 2011 WMC Muaythai Junior Middleweight World Champion
  - 2009 WMC/MAD Muaythai Super Welterweight World Champion
  - 2006-2007 WMC Muaythai Super Welterweight World Champion
- WBC Muay Thai
  - 2014 WBC Muaythai Diamond World Championship
- Thai Fight
  - 2012 Thai Fight 70 kg Tournament Champion
  - 2011 Thai Fight 70 kg Tournament Champion
  - 11–0 record
- S-1 Muaythai
  - 2005 S-1 Super Welterweight World Champion
- Muay Thai Association
  - 2005 MTA World Champion
- Kunlun Fight
  - 2016 Kunlun Fight Muaythai Middleweight World Championship
- Phoenix Fighting Championship
  - 2016 PFC Junior Middle Weight Championship
- King of Martial Arts
  - 2003 KOMA GP Lightweight Champion

=== Shoot Boxing ===
- S-cup
  - 2010 Shoot Boxing S-Cup World champion

=== Accomplishments ===
- LiverKick.com
  - 2013 LiverKick.com Comeback of the Year
- Martial Arts History Museum Hall of Fame
  - 2016 Hall of Fame - Martial Arts History Museum

== Fight record ==
Kickboxing / Muay Thai record
246 wins (74 (T)KOs), 25 losses, 14 draws, 2 no contests
Date	Result	Opponent	Event	Location	Method	Round	Time
2026-10-03	Win	(China) Meng Gaofeng	MAX Muay Thai	Pattaya, Thailand	Decision	3	3:00
2026-04-24	Win	(China) Meng Gaofeng	T Fight All Star	Kuala Lumpur, Malaysia	Decision (unanimous)	3	3:00
2024-12-21	Win	(China) Han Wenbao	Rajadamnern World Series, Rajadamnern Stadium	Bangkok, Thailand	Decision (unanimous)	3	3:00
2024-07-07	Loss	(Bulgaria) Stoyan Koprivlenski	K-1 World MAX 2024 - World Championship Tournament Final, Quarter Finals	Tokyo, Japan	Decision (unanimous)	3	3:00
2024-03-23	Win	(Brazil) Minoru Kimura	Rizin Landmark 9	Kobe, Japan	KO (right cross)	2	1:19
2023-12-02	Win	(Spain) Nayanesh Ayman	Legend of Rajadamnern: The Revenge	Bangkok, Thailand	Decision (unanimous)	3	3:00
2023-09-24	NC	(China) Wang Yanlong	Grandview International Fight Super Competition	Guangzhou, China	No contest (ruleset confusion)	1	3:00
2023-09-09	NC	(Japan) Yasuhiro Kido	Legend of Rajadamnern: Last of the Generation, Rajadamnern Stadium	Bangkok, Thailand	Doctor stoppage (head clash)	2	
2023-05-06	Draw	(Japan) Rukiya Anpo	Rizin 42	Tokyo, Japan	Decision (unanimous)	3	3:00
2022-07-06	Win	(Belarus) Dmitry Varats	World Fight Kun Khmer Series	Phnom Penh, Cambodia	Decision (unanimous)	3	3:00
2019-10-27	Win	(Democratic Republic of the Congo) Chris Ngimbi	MAS Kun Khmer	Phnom Penh, Cambodia	TKO (referee stoppage)	1	4:10
2019-03-09	Win	(Russia) Artem Pashporin	All Star Fight 8	Thailand	Decision (unanimous)	3	3:00
2019-01-27	Win	(Denmark) Niclas Larsen	All Star Fight 7	Phuket, Thailand	TKO (referee stoppage)	3	3:00
2018-11-04	Win	(France) Gaetan Dambo	All Star Fight 6	Pattaya, Thailand	Decision (unanimous)	3	3:00
2018-07-06	Win	(Czech Republic) Michael Krcmar	All Star Fight 5	Prague, Czech Republic	Decision (unanimous)	3	3:00
2018-05-21	Win	(Australia) Victor Nagbe	All Star Fight 4	Hong Kong, China	Decision (unanimous)	3	3:00
2018-04-28	Win	(Portugal) Luis Passos	All Star Fight 3	Bangkok, Thailand	Decision (unanimous)	3	3:00
2018-03-05	Loss	(Spain) Jonay Risco	Enfusion 63	Abu Dhabi, United Arab Emirates	Decision	5	3:00
For the Enfusion -70kg World Championship.
2018-02-04	Win	(Democratic Republic of the Congo) Nayanesh Ayman	Kunlun Fight 69	Guiyang, China	KO (left hook)	1	2:06
2017-11-12	Win	(Morocco) Marouan Toutouh	Kunlun Fight 67	Sanya, China	KO (left hook)	2	1:03
2017-09-30	Win	(Ukraine) Sergey Kulyaba	All Star Fight 2	Bangkok, Thailand	Decision (unanimous)	3	3:00
2017-08-20	Win	(France) Azize Hlali	All Star Fight	Bangkok, Thailand	KO (left hook)	1	2:52
2017-06-11	Win	(China) Kong Lingfeng	Kunlun Fight 62	Bangkok, Thailand	Decision (unanimous)	3	3:00
2017-01-01	Win	(China) Tian Xin	Kunlun Fight 56	Sanya, China	Decision (unanimous)	3	3:00
2016-12-10	Win	(Belarus) Andrei Kulebin	Phoenix Fighting Championship	Zouk Mikael, Lebanon	Decision (unanimous)	3	3:00
Wins the PFC Junior Middle Weight Championship.
2016-11-05	Loss	(China) Yi Long	Wu Lin Feng 2016: Fight of the Century	Zhengzhou, China	Decision (unanimous)	3	3:00
Lost the Wu Lin Feng World Championship.
2016-09-24	Win	(France) Dylan Salvador	Kunlun Fight 53 - Muay Thai 70kg Championship	Beijing, China	Decision	3	3:00
Wins the Kunlun Fight Muaythai Middleweight World Championship.
2016-06-05	Win	(China) Wang Weihao	Kunlun Fight 45	Chengdu, China	TKO (right high kick)	1	2:35
2016-03-20	Win	(China) Kong Lingfeng	Kunlun Fight 39	Dongguan, China	Decision (unanimous)	3	3:00
2016-01-09	Win	(China) Liu Hainan	Kunlun Fight 36	Shanghai, China	Decision (unanimous)	3	3:00
2015-10-28	Win	(China) Gu Hui	Kunlun Fight 32	Dazhou, China	TKO (knees)	2	1:54
2015-07-28	Loss	(Russia) Khayal Dzhaniev	Topking World Series 4 – 70 kg Tournament, Semi-finals	Hong Kong, China	Decision	3	3:00
2015-07-01	Win	(Russia) Artem Pashporin	T-one Muay Thai 2015	Beijing, China	Decision (unanimous)	3	3:00
2015-06-06	Win	(China) Yi Long	Wu Lin Feng 2015 – Fight of the Century	Jiyuan, China	Decision (unanimous)	3	3:00
Wins the Wu Lin Feng World Championship.
2015-05-02	Win	(China) Yuan Bin	Quanwei WMC Muaythai International Title 2015	Xiamen, China	Decision	3	3:00
Retains the WMC Junior Middleweight World championship.
2014-12-20	Win	(Ukraine) Dmytro Konstantinov	Topking World Series 3 – 70 kg Tournament, Quarter-finals	Hong Kong, China	Decision (unanimous)	3	3:00
2014-11-15	Win	(Australia) Steve Moxon	Topking World Series 2	Paris, France	TKO (elbow)	3	1:07
2014-10-11	Loss	(Germany) Enriko Kehl	K-1 World MAX 2014 World Championship Tournament Final	Pattaya, Thailand	Retirement (left before ext.round)	3	3:00
For the K-1 World MAX 2014 World Championship Tournament title.
2014-09-13	Win	(China) Zhang Chunyu	Topking World Series - 70 kg Tournament, Final 16	Minsk, Belarus	Decision (unanimous)	3	3:00
2014-08-15	Win	(France) Abdoul Touré	Chiang Rai WBC Muaythai Championship	Chiang Rai, Thailand	TKO (right cross elbow)	3	0.44
Wins the WBC Muaythai Diamond World Championship
2014-06-14	Win	(France) Djime Coulibaly	Monte Carlo Fighting Masters 2014	Monte Carlo, Monaco	Decision (unanimous)	5	3:00
Wins the WMC Junior Middleweight World championship.
2014-06-06	Win	(Brazil) Adaylton Freitas	Muay Thai in Macau	Macau, China	KO (left high kick)	2	1:12
2014-04-14	Win	(Australia) Victor Nagbe	Combat Banchamek	Surin, Thailand	Decision (unanimous)	3	3:00
2014-02-23	Win	(South Korea) Lee Sung-Hyun	K-1 World MAX 2013 Final 4	Baku, Azerbaijan	Decision (unanimous)	3	3:00
For The K-1 World MAX 2013 World Tournament Semi-Final.
2013-12-28	Win	(China) Zhou Zhipeng	K-1 World MAX World Championship Tournament Quarter-final in Foshan	Foshan, China	Extension round decision	4	3:00
K-1 World MAX 2013 World Tournament Quarter-Final.
2013-12-10	Win	(Germany) Enriko Kehl	MAX Muay Thai 5: The Final Chapter	Khon Kaen, Thailand	Decision	3	3:00
2013-10-06	Win	(Japan) Yoshihiro Sato	MAX Muay Thai 4	Sendai, Japan	Decision	3	3:00
2013-09-14	Win	(Spain) David Calvo	K-1 World MAX 2013 Final 16	Mallorca, Spain	KO (left hook to the body)	1	2:20
K-1 World MAX 2013 World Championship Tournament Final 16.
2013-08-10	Win	(China) Dong Wenfei	Wu Lin Feng & MAX Muay Thai 3	Zhengzhou, China	Decision (2-1)	3	3:00
2013-05-06	Win	(United States) Malik Watson	MAX Muay Thai 1	Surin, Thailand	KO	2	
2012-12-16	Win	(Belarus) Vitaly Gurkov	THAI FIGHT 2012 - King of Muay Thai Tournament Finals	Bangkok Thailand	Decision	3	3:00
Wins the 2012 THAI FIGHT -70 kg/154 lb Tournament Championship Final.
2012-11-25	Win	(Japan) Tomoyuki Nishikawa	THAI FIGHT 2012 - King of Muay Thai Tournament 2nd round	Nakhon Ratchasima, Thailand	Decision (unanimous)	3	3:00
70 kg Tournament Semi-finals.
2012-10-23	Win	(Italy) Mauro Serra	THAI FIGHT 2012 - King of Muay Thai Tournament 1st round	Bangkok, Thailand	TKO (right knee to the body)	3	
70 kg Tournament Quarter-finals .
2012-08-17	Win	(France) Toure Abdoul	THAI FIGHT EXTREME 2012: England	Leicester, England	TKO (right knee to the body)	2	1:02
2012-04-17	Win	(Russia) Rustem Zaripov	THAI FIGHT EXTREME 2012: Pattaya	Pattaya, Thailand	KO (punches)	2	2:45
2012-01-21	Win	(Russia) Dzhabar Askerov	Yokkao Extreme 2012	Milan, Italy	Decision	3	3:00
2011-12-18	Win	(Australia) Frank Giorgi	THAI FIGHT 2011 – 70 kg Tournament Final	Bangkok, Thailand	Decision	3	3:00
Wins the 2011 THAI FIGHT -70 kg/154 lb Tournament Championship.
2011-11-27	Win	(France) Mickaël Piscitello	THAI FIGHT 2011 – 70 kg Tournament Semi-final	Bangkok, Thailand	KO (right elbow)	3	
2011-09-25	Win	(France) Abdallah Mabel	THAI FIGHT 2011 – 70 kg Tournament Quarter-final	Bangkok, Thailand	Decision	3	3:00
2011-09-02	Win	(South Africa) Warren Stevelmans	Muaythai Premier League: Round 1	Long Beach, United States	TKO (referee stoppage)	4	
Wins WMC World Junior Middleweight title.
2011-08-07	Win	(Japan) Tomoaki Makino	THAI FIGHT EXTREME 2011: Japan	Ariake, Japan	TKO	2	2:49
2011-07-17	Win	(Brazil) Gilmar China	THAI FIGHT EXTREME 2011: Hong Kong	Hong Kong, China	Decision (unanimous)	3	3:00
2011-05-14	Win	(France) Djime Coulibaly	THAI FIGHT EXTREME 2011: France	Cannes, France	Decision	3	3:00
2011-02-12	Win	(Morocco) Youssef Boughanem	La Nuit des Titans 6, Palais des Sports	Tours, France	TKO (dislocated shoulder)	1	1:32
2010-12-30	Win	(Japan) Hiroki Nakajima	World Victory Road Presents: Soul of Fight	Tokyo, Japan	Decision (unanimous)	3	3:00
2010-11-23	Win	(United States) Toby Imada	Shoot Boxing World Tournament 2010, Final	Tokyo, Japan	TKO (low kick)	2	
Wins the Shoot Boxing World Tournament S-Cup 2010.
2010-11-23	Win	(Netherlands) Henry van Opstal	Shoot Boxing World Tournament 2010, Semi-finals	Tokyo, Japan	Decision (unanimous)	3	3:00
2010-11-23	Win	(Japan) Hiroki Shishido	Shoot Boxing World Tournament 2010, Quarter-finals	Tokyo, Japan	Decision (unanimous)	3	3:00
2010-06-19	Win	(China) Xu Yan	Wu Lin Feng	Zhengzhou, China	Decision	3	3:00
2010-05-29	Win	(England) Jordan Watson	MSA Muaythai Premier League 3	London, England	Decision (unanimous)	5	3:00
2009-10-26	Loss	(Netherlands) Andy Souwer	K-1 World MAX 2009 Final, Semi-finals	Yokohama, Japan	Ext. R decision (split)	4	3:00
2009-07-13	Win	(Netherlands) Nieky Holzken	K-1 World MAX 2009 Final 8	Tokyo, Japan	Decision (unanimous)	3	3:00
Qualifies for K-1 World MAX 2009 Final.
2009-06-26	Win	(Australia) John Wayne Parr	Champions of Champions 2	Montego Bay, Jamaica	Decision (unanimous)	5	3:00
Wins WMC/MAD Muaythai Super Welterweight World title.
2009-04-21	Win	(Brazil) Andre Dida	K-1 World MAX 2009 Final 16	Fukuoka, Japan	Ext. R decision (unanimous)	4	3:00
Qualifies for K-1 World MAX 2009 Final 8.
2008-11-29	Loss	(Netherlands) Albert Kraus	It's Showtime 2008 Eindhoven	Eindhoven, Netherlands	Decision	3	3:00
2008-10-01	Win	(India) Black Mamba	K-1 World MAX 2008 Final, Reserve Fight	Tokyo, Japan	KO (right hook)	1	2:18
2008-07-07	Loss	(Japan) Yoshihiro Sato	K-1 World MAX 2008 Final 8	Tokyo, Japan	KO (right hook)	3	1:50
Fails to qualify for K-1 World MAX 2008 Final.
2008-04-26	Win	(Morocco) Faldir Chahbari	K-1 World Grand Prix 2008 in Amsterdam	Amsterdam, Netherlands	Decision (split)	3	3:00
2008-04-09	Win	(Netherlands) Albert Kraus	K-1 World MAX 2008 Final 16	Tokyo, Japan	Ext R. decision (unanimous)	4	3:00
Qualifies for K-1 World MAX 2008 Final 8.
2008-02-24	Win	(South Korea) Joon Kim	K-1 Asia MAX 2008 in Seoul	Seoul, South Korea	KO (right hook)	2	0:37
2008-02-02	Win	(Japan) Yoshihiro Sato	K-1 World MAX 2008 Japan Tournament	Tokyo, Japan	Ext R. decision (split)	4	3:00
2007-10-03	Loss	(Japan) Masato	K-1 World MAX 2007 World Championship Final, Quarter-finals	Tokyo, Japan	Decision (unanimous)	3	3:00
2007-06-28	Win	(Netherlands) Nieky Holzken	K-1 World MAX 2007 Final Elimination	Tokyo, Japan	Decision (unanimous)	3	3:00
Qualifies for K-1 World MAX 2007 World Tournament Final.
2007-05-19	Draw	(Italy) Giorgio Petrosyan	K-1 Scandinavia GP 2007	Stockholm, Sweden	Decision draw	5	3:00
Retains WMC Muaythai Super Welterweight World title.
2007-04-04	Win	(Nigeria) Andy Ologun	K-1 World MAX 2007 World Elite Showcase	Yokohama, Japan	Decision (unanimous)	3	3:00
2007-03-17	Win	(Russia) Dzhabar Askerov	K-1 East Europe MAX 2007	Vilnius, Lithuania	Decision (unanimous)	3	3:00
2007-02-05	Win	(Mongolia) Tsogto Amara	K-1 World MAX 2007 Japan Tournament	Tokyo, Japan	Decision (unanimous)	3	3:00
2006-11-24	Win	(Philippines) Ole Laursen	K-1 World MAX North European Qualification 2007	Stockholm, Sweden	TKO (referee stoppage)	2	2:49
2006-09-04	Win	(Japan) Hiroki Shishido	K-1 World MAX 2006 Champions' Challenge	Tokyo, Japan	KO (left hook)	1	0:15
2006-06-30	Win	(Netherlands) Andy Souwer	K-1 World MAX 2006 World Championship Final, Final	Yokohama, Japan	TKO (right cross/3 knockdowns)	2	2:13
Wins K-1 World MAX 2006 World Championship title.
2006-06-30	Win	(Armenia) Gago Drago	K-1 World MAX 2006 World Championship Final, Semi-finals	Yokohama, Japan	Decision (unanimous)	3	3:00
2006-06-30	Win	(Japan) Yoshihiro Sato	K-1 World MAX 2006 World Championship Final, Quarter-finals	Yokohama, Japan	KO (left hook)	2	0:18
2006-05-26	Draw	(France) Morad Sari	K-1 Rules "Le Grand Tournoi" 2006	Paris, France	Decision	5	3:00
2006-04-05	Win	(South Africa) Virgil Kalakoda	K-1 World MAX 2006 World Tournament Open	Tokyo, Japan	Ext R. decision (split)	4	3:00
Qualifies for K-1 World MAX 2006 World Championship Final.
2006-03-19	Win	(Suriname) Marco Pique	SLAMM "Nederland vs Thailand"	Almere, Netherlands	Decision (unanimous)	5	3:00
2006-02-18	Win	(Thailand) Jomhod Kiatadisak	WMC Explosion III	Stockholm, Sweden	KO (right hook to the body)	2	3:00
Wins WMC Muaythai Super Welterweight World title.
2006-02-04	Win	(Greece) Mike Zambidis	K-1 World MAX 2006 Japan Tournament	Saitama, Japan	Decision (unanimous)	3	3:00
2005-11-05	Win	(Morocco) Youssef Akhnikh	Muay Thai	Trieste, Italy	TKO (corner stoppage)	1	3:00
2005-09-09	Win	(France) Jean-Charles Skarbowsky	Xplosion Hong Kong	Hong Kong, China	Decision (unanimous)	5	3:00
Wins S1 Super-Welterweight World title.
2005-07-20	Loss	(Netherlands) Andy Souwer	K-1 World MAX 2005 Championship Final, Final	Yokohama, Japan	2 ext R. decision (split)	5	3:00
Fight was for K-1 World MAX 2005 World Championship title.
2005-07-20	Win	(Netherlands) Albert Kraus	K-1 World MAX 2005 Championship Final, Semi-finals	Yokohama, Japan	Decision (unanimous)	3	3:00
2005-07-20	Win	(Mongolia) Jadamba Narantungalag	K-1 World MAX 2005 Championship Final, Quarter-finals	Yokohama, Japan	Decision (majority)	3	3:00
2005-05-04	Win	(Belarus) Vasily Shish	K-1 World MAX 2005 World Tournament Open	Tokyo, Japan	Decision (unanimous)	3	3:00
Qualifies for K-1 World MAX 2005 Championship Final.
2005-04-01	Win	(United Kingdom) Kieran Keddle	Thailand Boxing Sport Board "Muaythai Cultural Festival 2005"	Bangkok, Thailand	Decision	4	3:00
2005-02-23	Loss	(Netherlands) Albert Kraus	K-1 World MAX 2005 Japan Tournament	Tokyo, Japan	Ext R. decision (split)	4	3:00
2004-11-06	Win	(Japan) Katsumori Maita	Titans 1st	Kitakyushu, Japan	TKO (corner stoppage)	2	1:26
2004-10-13	Win	(Japan) Kozo Takeda	K-1 World MAX 2004 Champions' Challenge	Tokyo, Japan	2 ext R. decision (unanimous)	5	3:00
2004-07-07	Win	(Japan) Masato	K-1 World MAX 2004 World Tournament Final, Final	Tokyo, Japan	Ext R. decision (unanimous)	4	3:00
Wins K-1 World MAX 2004 World Championship title.
2004-07-07	Win	(Japan) Takayuki Kohiruimaki	K-1 World MAX 2004 World Tournament Final, Semi-final	Tokyo, Japan	KO (knee strikes)	2	0:42
2004-07-07	Win	(Australia) John Wayne Parr	K-1 World MAX 2004 World Tournament Final, Quarter-finals	Tokyo, Japan	Ext R. decision (split)	4	3:00
2004-05-20	Win	(Thailand) Munkong Kiatsomkuan	Kiatsingnoi, Rajadamnern Stadium	Bangkok, Thailand	Decision (unanimous)	5	3:00
2004-04-07	Win	(New Zealand) Jordan Tai	K-1 World MAX 2004 World Tournament Open	Tokyo, Japan	Decision (unanimous)	3	3:00
Qualifies for K-1 World MAX 2004 World Tournament Final.
2004-03-21	Win	(Thailand) Fuji Chalmsak	Magnum 4, NJKF	Tokyo, Japan	Decision (majority)	3	3:00
2003-11-18	Win	(Thailand) Khunsuk Phetsupaphan	Por.Pramuk, Lumpinee Stadium	Bangkok, Thailand	Decision (unanimous)	5	3:00
2003-10-10	Win	(China) Sun Tao	Chinese police VS Thai police kickboxing Championship	Guangzhou, China	TKO (corner stoppage)	2	1:25
2003-09-05	Win	(Thailand) Khunsuk Phetsupaphan	Omnoi Stadium	Samut Sakhon, Thailand	Decision	5	3:00
Wins the vacant Omnoi Stadium Lightweight title.
2003-08-31	Win	(Australia) Timor Daal	K.O.M.A. "King of Martial Arts" GP	Seoul, South Korea	KO (left elbow)	3	1:42
2003-05-31	Win	(Thailand) Khunsuk Phetsupaphan	Omnoi Stadium	Bangkok, Thailand	Decision	5	3:00
2003-04-08	Win	(Thailand) Nontachai Kiatwanlop	Lumpinee Stadium	Bangkok, Thailand	KO (high kick)	3	
2003-01-10	?	(Thailand) Pethnamek Sor Siriwat	Lumpinee Stadium	Bangkok, Thailand			
2002-12-14	Win	(Japan) Satoshi Kobayashi	D4D Toyota Marathon, Final Lumpinee Stadium	Bangkok, Thailand	Decision (unanimous)	3	3:00
Wins the Toyota Muay Thai Marathon 140 lbs Tournament title.
2002-12-14	Win	(Thailand) Khunsuk Phetsupaphan	D4D Toyota Marathon, Semi-finals Lumpinee Stadium	Bangkok, Thailand	Decision (unanimous)	3	3:00
2002-12-14	Win	(Thailand) Saengmorakot Waenaisapit	D4D Toyota Marathon, Quarter-finals Lumpinee Stadium	Bangkok, Thailand	Decision (unanimous)	3	3:00
2002-11-22	Win	(Thailand) Thongthai Por.Burapha	Por.Pramuk, Lumpinee Stadium	Bangkok, Thailand	KO (right high kick)	2	
2002-10-26	Loss	(Thailand) Pethnamek Sor Siriwat	Lumpinee Stadium	Bangkok, Thailand	Decision	5	3:00
2002-09-12	Draw	(Thailand) Thewaritnoi S.K.V. Gym	Lumpinee Stadium	Bangkok, Thailand	Draw	5	3:00
2002	Win	(Thailand) Panpetch		Bangkok, Thailand	TKO	3	
2002-06-09	Win	(Thailand) Phetarun Sor.Suwanpakdee	Lumpinee Stadium	Bangkok, Thailand	Decision (unanimous)	5	3:00
2002-05-10	Loss	(Thailand) Orono Majestic Gym	Lumpinee Stadium	Bangkok, Thailand	Decision	5	3:00
2002-04-21	Win	(Japan) Mikitada Igarashi	J-Network "J-Bloods"	Tokyo, Japan	TKO (doctor stoppage)	3	0:47
2002-03-29	Win	(Thailand) Banphot Sor.Boonya	Lumpinee Stadium	Bangkok, Thailand	Decision	5	3:00
2002-03-01	Win	(Thailand) Phetarun Sor.Suwanpakdee	Lumpinee Stadium	Bangkok, Thailand	Decision (unanimous)	5	3:00
2002-01-05	Loss	(Thailand) Sattaban Tor. Rattanakiat	Lumpinee Stadium	Bangkok, Thailand	Decision	5	3:00
2001-12-07	Loss	(Thailand) Charlie Sor Chaitamin	Lumpinee 45th Anniversary, Lumpinee Stadium	Bangkok, Thailand	Decision	5	3:00
For the vacant Lumpinee Stadium Featherweight title.
2001-11-16	?	(Thailand)	Lumpinee Stadium	Bangkok, Thailand			
2001-10-06	Loss	(Thailand) Tewaritnoi S.K.V. Gym	Lumpinee Stadium	Bangkok, Thailand	Decision	5	3:00
2001-09-07	Win	(Thailand) Sakchai Rungruangbua	Lumpinee Stadium	Bangkok, Thailand	Decision	5	3:00
2001-08-07	Loss	(Thailand) Orono Majestic Gym	Por.Pramuk, Lumpinee Stadium	Bangkok, Thailand	Decision	5	3:00
2001-07-14	Win	(Thailand) PetchArun Sor Ploenjit	Lumpinee Stadium	Bangkok, Thailand	Decision	5	3:00
2001-06-29	Win	(Thailand) Sinchainoi Sor Kittichai	Saengmorakot , Lumpinee Stadium	Bangkok, Thailand	KO (left high kick)	4	
Wins the vacant Thailand Featherweight title.
2001-05-19	Win	(Thailand) Pethek Sor.Suwanpakdee	Omnoi Stadium	Bangkok, Thailand	Decision	5	3:00
Wins the Omnoi Stadium Featherweight title.
2001-03-30	Win	(Thailand) Mangkornyok Mor Somnuk	Lumpinee Stadium	Bangkok, Thailand	KO (right elbow)	3	
2001	Win	(Thailand) Phetarun Sor.Suwanpakdee	Lumpinee Stadium	Bangkok, Thailand	Decision (unanimous)	5	3:00
2001-01-21	Loss	(Thailand) Mahakarn Por. Pongsawang	Channel 7 Stadium	Bangkok, Thailand	Decision	5	3:00
2001	Win	(Thailand) Seelaa Tor Bangsean	Channel 7 Stadium	Bangkok, Thailand	Decision (unanimous)	5	3:00
	Win	(Thailand) Pethnamek Sor Siriwat	Lumpinee Stadium	Bangkok, Thailand	Decision	5	3:00
2000-09-26	Loss	(Thailand) Petch-Ek Sor.Suwanphakdee	Por.Pramuk Lumpinee Stadium	Bangkok, Thailand	Decision	5	3:00
2000-09-01	?	(Thailand)	Por.Pramuk, Lumpinee Stadium	Bangkok, Thailand			
2000-08-11	Loss	(Thailand) Dokmaifai TorSitthichai	Fairtex, Lumpinee Stadium	Bangkok, Thailand	Decision	5	3:00
2000-06-17	Win	(Thailand) Hongthong Na.Muengkao	Omnoi Stadium	Bangkok, Thailand	Decision	5	3:00
2000-05-29	Win	(Thailand) Verhard lookphabath	Rajadamnern Stadium	Bangkok, Thailand	KO (elbow)	4	
2000-05-09	?	(Thailand)	Por.Pramuk, Lumpinee Stadium	Bangkok, Thailand			
2000-04-07	Win	(Thailand) Sakwitoon Royal Map Ta Phut	Por.Pramuk, Lumpinee Stadium	Bangkok, Thailand	Decision	5	3:00
2000-03-14	Loss	(Thailand) Krairat Por.Paoin	Thahan Suea, Lumpinee Stadium	Bangkok, Thailand	Decision	5	3:00
2000-02-01	Loss	(Thailand) Sod Looknongyangtoy	Lumpinee Stadium	Bangkok, Thailand	Decision	5	3:00
2000-01-07	Win	(Thailand) Coke Fairtex	Por.Pramuk, Lumpinee Stadium	Bangkok, Thailand	Decision (unanimous)	5	3:00
2000-01-01	Win	(Thailand) Sagatpetch Sor.Sakulpan	Lumpinee Stadium	Bangkok, Thailand	TKO (right elbow)	3	
1999-12-17	?	(Thailand)	Por.Pramuk, Lumpinee Stadium	Bangkok, Thailand			
1999-11-02	Win	(Thailand) Fahsitong Wor.Thaweekat	Lumpinee Stadium	Bangkok, Thailand	Decision	5	3:00
1999-09-17	Loss	(Thailand) Rattanasak Kratindaeng	Por.Pramuk, Lumpinee Stadium	Bangkok, Thailand	Decision	5	3:00
1999-07-30	Win	(Thailand) Deachkalon Sor Sumalee	Lumpinee Stadium	Bangkok, Thailand	Decision	5	3:00
1999-07-04	Win	(Thailand) Anusorn Luksurtatarn		Chachoengsao Province, Thailand	Decision	5	3:00
Legend: Win Loss Draw/no contest Notes

== Exhibition kickboxing record ==
Exhibition kickboxing record
Date	Result	Opponent	Event	Location	Method	Round	Time
2022-12-09	Draw	(Ukraine) Oleksandr Yefimenko	Rajadamnern World Series	Bangkok, Thailand	Draw	3	3:00
2022-10-28	Win	(Japan) Yoshihiro Sato	Rajadamnern World Series	Bangkok, Thailand	KO (right cross)	1	2:17
2022-08-19	Win	(Japan) Kota Miura	Rajadamnern World Series	Bangkok, Thailand	TKO (referee stoppage)	3	2:25
Legend: Win Loss Draw/no contest Notes

== Bare knuckle Muay Thai record ==
Professional record breakdown
1 match	1 win	0 losses
By decision	1	0

Res.	Record	Opponent	Method	Event	Date	Round	Time	Location	Notes
Win	1–0	Saenchai	Decision (unanimous)	BKFC Thailand 5: Legends of Siam	November 4, 2023	5	2:00	Bangkok, Thailand	

== Bare knuckle boxing record ==
Professional record breakdown
1 match	1 win	0 losses
By knockout	1	0

Res.	Record	Opponent	Method	Event	Date	Round	Time	Location	Notes
Win	1–0	Erkan Varol	KO (punches)	BKFC Thailand 3	September 3, 2022	1	1:50	Bangkok, Thailand	

== Exhibition boxing record ==
1 fight	0 wins	0 losses
Non-scored	1	

No.	Result	Record	Opponent	Type	Round, time	Date	Age	Location	Notes
1	—N/a	0–0 (1)	Kouzi	—N/a	3	19 Oct 2024	42 years, 164 days	Yokohama Cultural Gymnasium, Yokohama, Japan	Non-scored bout

== Filmography ==
Year	Title	Role	Notes	Ref.
2010	Yamada: The Samurai of Ayothaya	Ai-Seua	Thai debut film	
2012	Crazy Crying Lady	Colonel Chuchai	Guest appearance	
2013	Buakaw – Boxer, Legend, Legacy	Himself	Documentary	
2017	Thong Dee Fun Khao	Thongdee	Main role	

== See also ==
- List of K-1 events
- List of K-1 champions
- List of male kickboxers

Sporting positions
Preceded by Andy Souwer	S-Cup 2010 Winner; November 23, 2010	Succeeded by N/A
