= Andy Souwer =

Dutch kickboxer and mixed martial artist

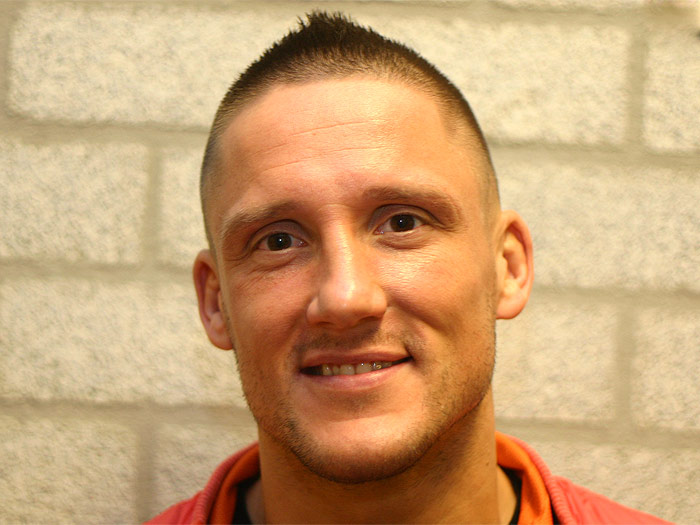
- Souwer in 2011
- Born: Andy Souwer; November 9, 1982 (age 43); Den Bosch, Netherlands
- Other names: The Destroyer; Souwer Power
- Height: 1.76 m (5 ft 9 1/2 in)
- Weight: 70 kg (154 lb; 11 st 0 lb)
- Division: Welterweight
- Style: Shootboxing, Kickboxing, Boxing, Muay Thai (Muay Mat/Muay Bouk)
- Stance: Orthodox
- Fighting out of: Den Bosch, Netherlands
- Team: Ling Ho Gym (1989–August 2005); Mejiro Gym (2005–2012); Team Souwer (2005–2021)
- Trainer: Paul Lamoth; John De Ling (1989–August 2005); Andre Mannaart (2005–2012)
- Years active: 1998–2021

Professional boxing record
- Total: 1
- Wins: 1
- By knockout: 1

Kickboxing record
- Total: 184
- Wins: 161
- By knockout: 98
- Losses: 22
- By knockout: 6
- Draws: 1

Mixed martial arts record
- Total: 5
- Wins: 2
- By knockout: 1
- By submission: 1
- Losses: 3
- By submission: 2
- By decision: 1

Other information
- Occupation: Souwer Sport Institute; Gym owner/trainer
- Website: http://www.andysouwer.com
- Last updated on: January 1, 2015

Andy Souwer (born 9 November 1982) is a Dutch former kickboxer and mixed martial artist of Cypriot origins He is a two-time K-1 World MAX champion (2005, 2007) and four-time Shootboxing World tournament champion as well as former It's Showtime 70MAX world champion, fighting out of Mejiro Gym in Amsterdam.

== Biography and career ==
Souwer started kickboxing when he was 7 years old at Ling Ho Gym in Den Bosch. He had his first kickboxing fight when he was 8 years old. He won all his fights, in all the weight classes he fought and became Dutch Champion.

In 1998, only 16 years old, Souwer fought his first A-Class MTBN Title match, which he won on points. When he was 18 he had three different World titles.

Souwer first went to Japan in 2002 to compete in the S-Cup 2002 shoot boxing competition where he became the winner after defeating Chinese sanshou title challenger Zheng Yuhao. He made his K-1 debut the next year and won his first K-1 World Max champion title in 2005.

Andy Souwer is the 2007 K-1 World Max Champion. He defeated Gago Drago followed by Albert Kraus and finally Masato to win the championship. He faced Masato again in Masato's retirement match at the Dynamite!! 2009 event, and lost.

He was scheduled to face Naruepol Fairtex at Fighterzone Kickboxing World Series MAX in Singapore on 25 February 2012. However, they were not paid by the promoter and the fight did not happen.

He won the Shoot Boxing World Tournament 2012 in Tokyo, Japan on 17 November 2012 After beating Kem Sitsongpeenong by majority decision (29-29, 29-28, 30-28) at the quarter-final stage and knocking out Hiroki Shishido in the semis, he defeated stablemate and student Henri van Opstal by unanimous decision (30-29, 30-29, 30-28) in the final.

At the K-1 World MAX 2012 World Championship Tournament Final in Athens, Greece on 15 December 2012, Souwer outpointed Andy Ristie in the quarter-finals before losing a unanimous decision to Artur Kyshenko in the semis, in what was the fourth fight of their rivalry.

He lost to Dzhabar Askerov by split decision in the main event of Yokkao Extreme 2013 in Milan, Italy on 26 January 2013.

Souwer led a team of shoot boxers against a team of Pancrase fighters at Shoot Boxing 2013 - Act 4 on 23 June 2013. There was some controversy leading up to the event, with Souwer saying of the Pancrase representatives "in Holland, they are what we call B-level fighters" and Shoot Boxing founder and president Caesar Takeshi storming out of a pre-fight press conference, apparently so upset at Pancrase's disrespectful selection of opponents that he could no longer bear to be a part of the proceedings. Souwer knocked out his opponent, Kota Okazawa, with a left hook in round one.

Souwer was scheduled to fight Maximo Suarez at Enfusion Live: Tenerife in Tenerife, Spain on 13 July 2013 but withdrew for undisclosed reasons.

He took a unanimous decision over Yasuhiro Kido at the K-1 World MAX 2013 World Championship Tournament Final 16 in Mallorca, Spain on 14 September 2013.

He defeated Steve Moxon by unanimous decision at Shoot Boxing Battle Summit Ground Zero Tokyo 2013 in Tokyo, Japan on 15 November 2013.

He was scheduled to fight Enriko Kehl at the K-1 World MAX 2013 World Championship Tournament Quarter Finals - Part 1 in Foshan, China on 28 December 2013. However, he was unable to compete after suffering from a bout of appendicitis in the weeks prior to the event which forced him into hospital where they had to perform a routine but emergency surgical procedure to remove the troubled organ. His opponent, Kehl, was also unable to fight on the card after suffering numerous cuts in a fight with Buakaw earlier that month and was moved to K-1 World MAX 2013 World Championship Tournament Quarter Finals - Part 2 and matched with Shane Campbell.

Andy Souwer and Shemsi Beqiri were set to fight at SuperPro Fight Night VI in Basel, Switzerland on 25 January 2014 but Souwer withdrew due to his bout of appendicitis and was replaced by Foad Sadeghi.

He lost a split decision to Tsukuru Midorikawa at Rikix: No Kick, No Life 2014 in Tokyo, Japan on 11 February 2014.

Souwer made his professional boxing debut on 17 March 2014, winning by TKO after his opponent Paata Varduashvili retired in his corner at the end of the fourth round in Den Bosch, Netherlands.

He defeated Yuri Bessmertny via UD at Legend 3: Pour Homme in Milan, Italy on 5 April 2014.

Souwer announced his retirement following his loss to Marat Grigorian at ONE Championship: First Strike Kallang, Singapore on 15 October 2021.

== Titles ==
=== Kickboxing ===
- World Full Contact Association
  - 2010 W.F.C.A. World Thaiboxing Super Welterweight (-70 kg) Champion
- It's Showtime
  - 2012 It's Showtime "70kg MAX" World Champion
- K-1
  - K-1 World MAX 2009 Runner Up
  - K-1 World MAX 2007 Champion
  - K-1 World MAX 2006 Runner Up
  - K-1 World MAX 2005 Champion
- A.R.D.D.D.
  - A.R.D.D.D. World Super welterweight Champion
- F.I.M.C.
  - F.I.M.C. World Super welterweight Champion
- World Professional Kickboxing Association
  - W.P.K.A. World Super welterweight Champion
- International Sport Karate Association
  - I.S.K.A. World Super welterweight Champion
- World Kickboxing Association
  - W.K.A. World Super welterweight Champion
- World Muay Thai Association
  - W.M.T.A. World Super welterweight Champion

=== Shoot boxing ===
- S-Cup
  - 2012 S-cup World Champion
  - 2008 S-cup World Champion
  - 2006 S-cup Runner Up
  - 2004 S-cup World Champion
  - 2002 S-cup World Champion
- World Shoot Boxing Association
  - W.S.B.A. World Super Welterweight Champion

== Kickboxing record ==
Professional Kickboxing Record
'161 Wins 98 (T)KO's, 22 Losses, 1 Draw
Date	Result	Opponent	Event	Location	Method	Round	Time
2021-10-15	Loss	(Armenia) Marat Grigorian	ONE Championship: First Strike	Kallang, Singapore	TKO (Leg Injury)	2	2:26
Kickboxing Featherweight Grand Prix Quarter Final
2020-12-04	Win	(China) Zhang Chunyu	ONE Championship: Big Bang	Kallang, Singapore	Decision (Unanimous)	3	3:00
2019-03-31	Loss	(Thailand) Yodsanklai Fairtex	ONE Championship 93: A New Era	Tokyo, Japan	TKO (Punches)	2	0:51
2018-10-06	Loss	(Nigeria) Anthony Njokuani	ONE Championship: Kingdom of Heroes	Bangkok, Thailand	Decision (Split)	3	3:00
2018-02-17	Loss	(Turkey) Tayfun Özcan	Enfusion Live 62	Eindhoven, Netherlands	KO (Overhand Right)	4	2:12
For the Enfusion Live World -72.5 kg title.
2016-11-11	Win	(Japan) Miyakoshi Souichiro	Shootboxing 2016	Tokyo, Japan	Decision (unanimous)	3	3:00
2016-04-03	Win	(Morocco) Mohamed Khamal	World Fighting League	Hoofddorp, Netherlands	Decision(Unanimous)	3	3:00
2016-01-23	Win	(Argentina) Damian Segovia	Golden Fight League	Rosario, Argentina	TKO (Arm Injury)	1	3:00
2015-12-01	Win	(Japan) Kuniyoshi Hironaka	Shootboxing 30th Anniversary	Tokyo, Japan	Decision (Unanimous)	3	3:00
2015-09-16	Loss	(Japan) Hinata Watanabe	Rebels. 38	Tokyo, Japan	Decision (Unanimous)	3	3:00
2015-08-22	Ex	(Japan) Caesar Takeshi	Shoot Boxing 30th Anniversary “Caesar Time!”	Ota, Tokyo, Japan	No Decision	1	3:00
2015-04-18	Loss	(Spain) Jonay Risco	Enfusion Live 27	Tenerife, Spain	Decision(Extra Round)	4	
2015-04-04	Win	(China) Dong Wenfei	Wu Lin Feng	China	Decision (Unanimous)	3	3:00
2015-02-11	Win	(Japan) Hideya Tanaka	No Kick, No Life 2015	Tokyo, Japan	KO (Left High Kick)	3	0:11
2015-01-03	Loss	(Thailand) Sitthichai Sitsongpeenong	Kunlun Fight 15: The World MAX Return - Middleweight Tournament, Final	Nanjing, China	Decision(Unanimous)	3	3:00
2015-01-03	Win	(China) Jiao Fukai	Kunlun Fight 15: The World MAX Return - Middleweight Tournament, Semi Finals	Nanjing, China	TKO (retirement)	3	3:00
2014-11-30	Win	(Japan) Kuniyoshi Hironaka	S-cup 2014	Tokyo, Japan	TKO (second stoppage)	3	0:32
2014-11-23	Win	(Iran) Ardalan Sheikholeslami	Enfusion Live 22	Groningen, Netherlands	TKO (punches)	4	2:40
Wins W.F.C.A. World K-1 Junior Middleweight (-69.85 kg) Championship
2014-10-18	Win	(Germany) Max Baumert	It's Fight Time	Darmstadt, Germany	TKO (Strikes)	2	1:56
2014-07-27	Loss	(Italy) Mustapha Haida	Kunlun Fight 7 - World MAX 2014 Final 16	Zhoukou, China	Decision(Unanimous)	4	3:00
2014-07-12	Win	(Japan) Yasuhiro Kido	RISE 100 - Blade 0	Tokyo, Japan	Decision	4	3:00
2014-04-05	Win	(Belarus) Yuri Bessmertny	Legend 3: Pour Homme	Milan, Italy	Decision (unanimous)	3	3:00
2014-02-11	Loss	(Japan) Tsukuru Midorikawa	Rikix: No Kick, No Life 2014	Tokyo, Japan	Decision (split)	3	3:00
2013-11-16	Win	(Australia) Steve Moxon	Shoot Boxing Battle Summit Ground Zero Tokyo 2013	Tokyo, Japan	Decision (unanimous)	3	3:00
2013-09-14	Win	(Japan) Yasuhiro Kido	K-1 World MAX 2013 World Championship Tournament Final 16	Mallorca, Spain	Decision (unanimous)	3	3:00
2013-06-23	Win	(Japan) Kota Okazawa	Shoot Boxing 2013 - Act 4	Tokyo, Japan	KO (left hook)	1	1:43
2013-01-26	Loss	(Russia) Dzhabar Askerov	Yokkao Extreme 2013	Milan, Italy	Decision (split)	3	3:00
2012-12-15	Loss	(Ukraine) Artur Kyshenko	K-1 World MAX 2012 World Championship Tournament Final, Semi Finals	Athens, Greece	Decision (unanimous)	3	3:00
2012-12-15	Win	(Suriname) Andy Ristie	K-1 World MAX 2012 World Championship Tournament Final, Quarter Finals	Athens, Greece	Decision (unanimous)	3	3:00
2012-11-17	Win	(Netherlands) Henri van Opstal	Shoot Boxing World Tournament 2012, Final	Tokyo, Japan	Decision (unanimous)	3	3:00
Wins Shoot Boxing World Tournament 2012 title.
2012-11-17	Win	(Japan) Hiroki Shishido	Shoot Boxing World Tournament 2012, Semi Finals	Tokyo, Japan	TKO (punches)	1	2:00
2012-11-17	Win	(Thailand) Kem Sitsongpeenong	Shoot Boxing World Tournament 2012, Quarter Finals	Tokyo, Japan	Decision (majority)	3	3:00
2012-07-21	Win	(Spain) Zeben Diaz	It's Showtime 59	Tenerife, Spain	Decision	3	3:00
2012-06-30	Win	(Democratic Republic of the Congo) Chris Ngimbi	It's Showtime 57&58	Brussels, Belgium	Decision	5	3:00
Wins It's Showtime 70MAX World Title -70kg
2012-05-27	Win	(Spain) Abraham Roqueñi	K-1 World MAX 2012 World Championship Tournament Final 16, First Round	Madrid, Spain	Decision (2-1)	3	3:00
Qualifies for K-1 World MAX 2012 Final.
2012-04-13	Win	(Japan) Satoru Suzuki	Road to S-Cup Act 2	Tokyo, Japan	TKO (Strikes)	4	1:09
2011-11-06	Win	(United States) Toby Imada	Shoot the Shooto 2011	Bunkyō, Tokyo, Japan	Decision (Unanimous)	3	3:00
2011-09-24	Loss	(Ukraine) Artur Kyshenko	It's Showtime "Fast & Furious 70MAX", Semi Finals	Brussels, Belgium	Decision (Unanimous)	3	3:00
2011-09-24	Win	(Armenia) Harut Grigorian	It's Showtime "Fast & Furious 70MAX", Quarter Finals	Brussels, Belgium	Ext. Round Decision (Split)	4	3:00
2011-04-23	Win	(Japan) Yoshihiro Sato	Shootboxing 2011 Act 2	Tokyo, Japan	Decision (3-0)	3	3:00
2011-03-06	Win	(Morocco) L'houcine Ouzgni	It's Showtime Sporthallen Zuid	Amsterdam, Netherlands	Decision (Unanimous)	3	3:00
2011-02-05	Loss	(Spain) Abraham Roqueñi	El Desafio K-1 Rules	Málaga, Spain	Decision(Decision)	3	3:00
2010-12-11	Win	(Thailand) Pajonsuk	Yiannis Evgenikos presents: It’s Showtime Athens	Athens, Greece	Decision (5-0)	3	3:00
2010-11-23	Loss	(United States) Toby Imada	Shoot Boxing World Tournament 2010, Semi-final	Bunkyō, Tokyo, Japan	Decision (Split)	3	3:00
2010-11-23	Win	(Thailand) Bovy Sor Udomson	Shoot Boxing World Tournament 2010, Quarter-final	Bunkyō, Tokyo, Japan	KO (Right hook)	3	0:47
2010-09-18	Win	(Japan) Hinata Watanabe	Shoot Boxing "Ishin 4"	Bunkyō, Tokyo, Japan	KO (Choke)	1	0:48
2010-01-30	Win	(Morocco) Faldir Chahbari	Beast of the East	Zutphen, Netherlands	Decision	5	3:00
Wins Chahbari's W.F.C.A. World Thaiboxing Junior Middleweight (-69.85 kg) title
2009-12-31	Loss	(Japan) Masato	Dynamite!! 2009	Saitama (city), Japan	Decision (Unanimous)	5	3:00
2009-10-26	Loss	(Italy) Giorgio Petrosyan	K-1 World MAX 2009 Final, Final	Yokohama, Japan	Decision (Unanimous)	3	3:00
Fight was for K-1 World MAX 2009 World Championship title.
2009-10-26	Win	(Thailand) Buakaw Banchamek	K-1 World MAX 2009 Final, Semi Finals	Yokohama, Japan	Ext. R Decision (Split)	4	3:00
2009-07-13	Win	(Ukraine) Artur Kyshenko	K-1 World MAX 2009 Final 8	Tokyo, Japan	Ext. R Decision (Unanimous)	4	3:00
Qualifies for K-1 World MAX 2009 Final.
2009-05-16	Win	(Morocco) Chaid Oulad El Hadj	It's Showtime 2009 Amsterdam	Amsterdam, Netherlands	Decision (Unanimous)	3	3:00
2009-04-21	Win	(Netherlands) Leroy Kaestner	K-1 World MAX 2009 Final 16	Fukuoka, Japan	Decision (Unanimous)	3	3:00
Qualifies for K-1 World MAX 2008 Final 8.
2009-03-14	Loss	(Italy) Giorgio Petrosyan	Oktagon presents: It's Showtime 2009	Milan, Italy	Ext. R Decision (Unanimous)	4	3:00
2008-11-24	Win	(Japan) Kenichi Ogata	Shoot Boxing World Tournament 2008, Final	Saitama, Japan	KO (Left high kick)	2	2:11
Wins Shoot Boxing World Tournament 2008 title.
2008-11-24	Win	(Japan) Hiroki Shishido	Shoot Boxing World Tournament 2008, Semi Finals	Saitama, Japan	Decision (Unanimous)	3	3:00
2008-11-24	Win	(Estonia) Edvin-Erik Kibus	Shoot Boxing World Tournament 2008, Quarter Finals	Saitama, Japan	TKO (Ref. stop/2 knockdowns)	1	2:44
2008-10-01	Loss	(Ukraine) Artur Kyshenko	K-1 World MAX 2008 Final, Semi Finals	Tokyo, Japan	Ext. R Decision (Unanimous)	4	3:00
2008-07-07	Win	(South Africa) Warren Stevelmans	K-1 World MAX 2008 Final 8	Tokyo, Japan	Decision (Unanimous)	3	3:00
2008-04-09	Win	(Greece) Mike Zambidis	K-1 World MAX 2008 Final 16	Hiroshima, Japan	Ext.R KO (Left high kick)	4	2:05
Qualifies for K-1 World MAX 2008 Final.
2008-03-02	Win	(Thailand) Yodsaenklai Fairtex	SLAMM "Nederland vs Thailand IV"	Almere, Netherlands	Ext.R Decision (Unanimous)	4	3:00
2007-11-24	Win	(Netherlands) Nieky Holzken	Shootboxing in the Autotron	Rosmalen, Netherlands	Decision (Unanimous)	3	3:00
2007-10-28	Win	(Nigeria) Andy Ologun	Shoot Boxing Battle Summit "Ground Zero"	location?, Japan	Decision (Unanimous)	3	3:00
2007-10-03	Win	(Japan) Masato	K-1 World MAX 2007 Final, Final	Tokyo, Japan	TKO (Corner stop)	2	3:00
Wins K-1 World MAX 2007 World Championship title.
2007-10-03	Win	(Netherlands) Albert Kraus	K-1 World MAX 2007 Final, Semi Finals	Tokyo, Japan	Decision (Majority)	3	3:00
2007-10-03	Win	(Armenia) Gago Drago	K-1 World MAX 2007 Final, Quarter Finals	Tokyo, Japan	KO (Right hook)	2	1:43
2007-06-28	Win	(Philippines) Ole Laursen	K-1 World MAX 2007 Final 16	Tokyo, Japan	KO (Overhand Right)	1	2:07
Qualifies for K-1 World MAX 2007 Final.
2007-05-25	Win	(China) Wei Shoulei	Shootboxing vs Sanda	Japan	Decision (Unanimous)	3	3:00
2007-05-06	Win	(Netherlands) Joerie Mes	SLAMM "Nederland vs Thailand III"	Haarlem, Netherlands	Decision (Unanimous)	3	3:00
2007-04-04	Win	(Japan) Yoshihiro Sato	K-1 World MAX 2007 World Elite Showcase	Yokohama, Japan	Decision (Unanimous)	3	3:00
2006-11-03	Loss	(Japan) Kenichi Ogata	Shoot Boxing World Tournament 2006, Final	Tokyo, Japan	Decision (Unanimous)	3	3:00
Fight was for Shoot Boxing World Tournament 2006 title.
2006-11-03	Win	(Australia) Daniel Dawson	Shoot Boxing World Tournament 2006, Semi Finals	Tokyo, Japan	Decision (Unanimous)	3	3:00
2006-11-03	Win	(Brazil) Marfio Canoletti	Shoot Boxing World Tournament 2006, Quarter Finals	Tokyo, Japan	Decision (Unanimous)	3	3:00
2006-09-04	Win	(Japan) Takayuki Kohiruimaki	K-1 World MAX 2006 Champions' Challenge	Tokyo, Japan	Decision (Unanimous)	3	3:00
2006-06-30	Loss	(Thailand) Buakaw Por.Pramuk	K-1 World MAX 2006 Final, Final	Yokohama, Japan	TKO (Referee Stoppage)	2	2:13
Fight was for K-1 World MAX 2006 World Championship title.
2006-06-30	Win	(Japan) Masato	K-1 World MAX 2006 Final, Semi Finals	Yokohama, Japan	Decision (Unanimous)	3	3:00
2006-06-30	Win	(South Africa) Virgil Kalakoda	K-1 World MAX 2006 Final, Quarter Finals	Yokohama, Japan	TKO (Ref. stop/3 knockdowns)	3	2:23
2006-05-26	Win	(Japan) Takashi Ono	Shootboxing: NEO OPOPOZ Series 3rd.	Tokyo, Japan	Decision (Unanimous)	5	3:00
2006-04-05	Win	(Mongolia) Tsogto Amara	K-1 World MAX 2006 World Tournament Open	Tokyo, Japan	Ext. R Decision (Unanimous)	4	3:00
Qualifies for K-1 World MAX 2006 Final.
2006-02-25	Win	(South Korea) Pan-Soo Kim	K-1 Fighting Network KHAN 2006 in Busan	Busan, South Korea	Decision (Unanimous)	3	3:00
2005-11-25	Win	(Mongolia) Jadamba Narantungalag	Shootboxing: 20th Anniversary Series Final	location?, Japan	Decision (Unanimous)	5	3:00
2005-10-12	Win	(Japan) Kozo Takeda	K-1 World MAX 2005 Champions' Challenge	Tokyo, Japan	KO (Punches)	2	0:31
2005-07-20	Win	(Thailand) Buakaw Por.Pramuk	K-1 World MAX 2005 Final, Final	Yokohama, Japan	2 Ext. R Decision (Split)	5	3:00
Wins K-1 World MAX 2005 World Championship title.
2005-07-20	Win	(Japan) Yasuhiro Kazuya	K-1 World MAX 2005 Final, Semi Finals	Yokohama, Japan	TKO (Doc stop)	1	2:24
2005-07-20	Win	(Japan) Takayuki Kohiruimaki	K-1 World MAX 2005 Final, Quarter Finals	Yokohama, Japan	Decision (Unanimous)	3	3:00
2005-05-04	Win	(Brazil) Marfio Canoletti	K-1 World MAX 2005 Open	Tokyo, Japan	Decision (Unanimous)	3	3:00
Qualifies for K-1 World MAX 2005 Final.
2005-03-26	Draw	(Cape Verde) Alviar Lima	East Side 4	Amsterdam, Netherlands	Decision draw	5	3:00
2004-11-05	Win	(Thailand) Kuntap Weerasakreck	Shootboxing: Infinity-S Vol.5	location?, Japan	KO (Punches)	5	2:12
2004-09-19	Win	(Japan) Hiroki Shishido	Shoot Boxing World Tournament 2004, Final	Yokohama, Japan	TKO	2	0:50
Wins Shoot Boxing World Tournament 2004 title.
2004-09-19	Win	(Thailand) Changpuek Chorsepasert	Shoot Boxing World Tournament 2004, Semi Finals	Yokohama, Japan	Decision (Unanimous)	3	3:00
2004-09-19	Win	(Philippines) Ole Laursen	Shoot Boxing World Tournament 2004, Quarter Finals	Yokohama, Japan	KO (Punches)	1	2:55
2004-02-01	Win	(Japan) Hiroyuki Doi	Shoot boxing: Infinity-S Vol.1	Japan	TKO	4	1:11
Wins vacant 1st Shoot Boxing World Super welterweight (-70 kg) title.
2003-11-18	Win	(Japan) Takehiro Murahama	K-1 World MAX 2003 Champions' Challenge	Tokyo, Japan	Decision (Unanimous)	3	3:00
2003-09-23	Win	(United States) Carlos Condit	Shootboxing: "S" of the World Vol. 5	location?, Japan	TKO (Low Kicks)	5	2:43
2003-07-05	Loss	(Netherlands) Albert Kraus	K-1 World MAX 2003 Final, Quarter Finals	Saitama, Japan	TKO (Doc stop)	1	3:00
2003-04-13	Win	(New Zealand) Shane Chapman	Shootboxing: "S" of the World Vol. 2	Tokyo, Japan	Ext. R Disq. (Low Blow)	6	1:01
2002-11-05	Win	(Japan) Kenichi Ogata	Shootboxing: The Age of "S" Vol.5	Tokyo, Japan	Decision (Unanimous)	5	3:00
2002-09-22	Win	(Japan) Ryuji Goto	Shootboxing: The Age of "S" Vol.4	location?, Japan	Decision (Unanimous)	5	3:00
2002-07-07	Win	(China) Zheng Yuhao	Shoot Boxing World Tournament 2002, Final	Yokohama, Japan	Ext. R Decision (Majority)	4	3:00
Wins Shoot Boxing World Tournament 2002 title.
2002-07-07	Win	(Japan) Hiroyuki Doi	Shoot Boxing World Tournament 2002, Semi Finals	Yokohama, Japan	KO (Punch)	1	1:59
2002-07-07	Win	(Brazil) Manoel Fonseca	Shoot Boxing World Tournament 2002, Quarter Finals	Yokohama, Japan	TKO (Ref Stop/2 Knockdowns)	2	2:58
2002-06-08	Loss	(Morocco) Najim Ettouhlali	Muay Thai Champions League VII	Rotterdam, Netherlands	TKO (Doctor Stoppage)	4	3:00
2002-02-17	Win	(Morocco) Najim Ettouhlali	WPKL Gala in Hogendorphal	Amsterdam, Netherlands	Decision (Unanimous)	5	3:00
2001-11-03	Win	(Netherlands) Abdel Bchiri	Gala in Breidushal	Amsterdam, Netherlands	KO	1	
2001-09-23	Win	(Turkey) Ozkan Kose	Battle of Arnhem III	Arnhem, Netherlands	Decision	7	2:00
2001-03-24	Win	(Netherlands) Chris van Venrooij	WKPL Gala	Maastricht, Netherlands			
2001-01-27	Win	(Spain) Rafi Zouheir	Thaiboxing from Rabat	Rabat, Morocco	Decision	5	3:00
2000-06-04	Loss	(Croatia) Stjepan Veselic	Night of Revenge	Haarlem, Netherlands	KO	1	
1999-02-07	Win	(Netherlands) Chris van Venrooij	Matter of Honor	Rotterdam, Netherlands	Decision	5	3:00
Legend: Win Loss Draw/No contest Notes

== Professional Boxing record ==
Boxing Record
1 Win (1 (T)KO's), 0 Losses, 0 Draws
Date	Result	Opponent	Event	Location	Method	Round	Time
2014-03-17	Win	(Georgia (country)) Paata Varduashvili	Theater aan de Parade	Den Bosch, Netherlands	TKO (retirement)	4	3:00
Legend: Win Loss Draw/No contest Notes

== Mixed martial arts record ==
Professional record breakdown
5 matches	2 wins	3 losses
By knockout	1	0
By submission	1	2
By decision	0	1

Res.	Record	Opponent	Method	Event	Date	Round	Time	Location	Notes
Loss	2–3	Akiyo Nishiura	Decision (unanimous)	Rizin World Grand Prix 2017: Opening Round - Part 2	October 15, 2017	3	5:00	Fukuoka, Japan	
Win	2–2	Massaro Glunder	Submission (armbar)	World Fighting League MMA	May 27, 2017	3	N/A	Almere, Netherlands	
Loss	1–2	Kazuyuki Miyata	Submission (armbar)	Rizin World Grand-Prix 2016: Second Round	December 29, 2016	1	4:39	Saitama, Japan	
Loss	1–1	Daron Cruickshank	Submission (rear-naked choke)	Rizin World Grand-Prix 2016: First Round	September 25, 2016	1	4:09	Saitama, Japan	
Win	1–0	Yuichiro Nagashima	TKO (punches)	Rizin Fighting Federation - Iza no Mai	December 31, 2015	1	5:29	Saitama, Japan	

== See also ==
- List of male kickboxers
- List of K-1 champions
- List of It's Showtime (kickboxing) champions
- Shoot boxing

Sporting positions
Preceded by Rayen Simson	S-Cup 2002 Winner; July 7, 2002	Succeeded by Andy Souwer
Preceded by Andy Souwer	S-Cup 2004 Winner; September 19, 2004	Succeeded by Kenichi Ogata
Preceded by Kenichi Ogata	S-Cup 2008 Winner; November 24, 2008	Succeeded by Buakaw Por. Pramuk
Preceded by Super welterweight was established in November 2001.	1st Shoot Boxing World Super welterweight Champion; February 1, 2004 – Current	Succeeded by N/A
Preceded by Faldir Chahbari	2nd WFCA Thaiboxing World Junior middleweight Champion; January 30, 2010 – Current	Succeeded by N/A
