= K-1 World MAX 2006 World Championship final =

K-1 martial arts event in 2006

K-1 World MAX 2006 World Championship Final
- Promotion: K-1
- Date: June 30, 2006
- Venue: Yokohama Arena
- City: Yokohama, Japan
- Attendance: 16,918

Event chronology
K-1 Kings of Oceania 2006 Round 1	K-1 World MAX 2006 World Championship Final	K-1 World Grand Prix 2006 in Sapporo

K-1 World MAX 2006 World Championship Final was a kickboxing event promoted by the K-1 organization. It was the fifth K-1 World MAX final for middleweight kickboxers (70 kg/154 lb weight class), involving eight finalists and two reserve fighters, with all bouts fought under K-1 rules. Seven of the finalists had won elimination fights at the K-1 World MAX 2005 World Tournament Open, while the eighth, Virgil Kalakoda, had been invited despite losing his elimination match. The two reserve fighters had qualified via preliminary tournaments; Artur Kyshenko had won the K-1 East Europe MAX and Rayen Simson had won the K-1 MAX Netherlands. As well as tournament matches there were also a two opening fights and two super fights fought under K-1 rules (middleweight and heavyweight). In total there were eighteen fighters at the event, representing nine countries.

The tournament was won by Buakaw Por. Pramuk who defeated Andy Souwer in the final. Prior to the tournament both fighters had stated their intention to be the first fighter to win two K-1 MAX finals, with Buakaw becoming the first two-time champion defeating Souwer via KO in the second round of their match. Other results saw Muay Thai world champion Yodsanklai Fairtex defeat SuperLeague starlet Kamal El Amrani and Kenpo Karate expert Fernando Calleros defeated local fighter Kozo Takeda, both by decision. The event was held at the Yokohama Arena in Yokohama, Japan on Friday, 30 June 2006, in front of a sellout crowd of 16,918 and was broadcast live across Japan on TBS.

== K-1 World MAX 2006 World Championship Final Tournament ==
K-1 World MAX Open
(Japan) Masato	TKO
(Lithuania) Remigijus Morkevičius
(South Korea) Chi Bin Lim
(Japan) Takayuki Kohiruimaki	TKO
(Mongolia) Tsogto Amara
(Netherlands) Andy Souwer	DEC
(Turkey) Ali Gunyar
(Netherlands) Albert Kraus	DEC
(Armenia) Gago Drago	DEC
(Denmark) Ole Laursen
(South Africa) Virgil Kalakoda
(Thailand) Buakaw Por. Pramuk	DEC
(Japan) Yoshihiro Sato	DEC
(Greece) Mike Zambidis

Quarter Finals
(Japan) Masato	DEC
(Japan) Takayuki Kohiruimaki
(Netherlands) Andy Souwer	TKO
(South Africa) Virgil Kalakoda *
(Netherlands) Albert Kraus
(Armenia) Gago Drago	DEC
(Thailand) Buakaw Por. Pramuk	KO
(Japan) Yoshihiro Sato

Semi Finals
(Japan) Masato
(Netherlands) Andy Souwer	DEC
(Armenia) Gago Drago
(Thailand) Buakaw Por. Pramuk	DEC

Final
(Netherlands) Andy Souwer
(Thailand) Buakaw Por. Pramuk	KO

* Virgil Kalakoda was invited to the Final despite his elimination fight defeat

== Results ==
K-1 World MAX 2006 World Championship Final Results
Opening Fight 1 –100 kg: K-1 Rules / 3Min. 3R Ext.1R
(Japan) Mitsugu Noda def. Keiichi Nishiwaki (Japan)
Noda defeated Nishiwaki by KO at 1:45 of the 1st Round.
Opening Fight 2 –70 kg: K-1 Rules / 3Min. 3R Ext.1R
(Thailand) Yodsanklai Fairtex def. Kamal El Amrani (Germany)
Fairtex defeated El Amrani by 3rd Round Unanimous Decision 3-0 (30-26, 30-26, 30-26).
K-1 World MAX Tournament Reserve Fight -70 kg: K-1 Rules / 3Min. 3R Ext.1R
(Ukraine) Artur Kyshenko def. Rayen Simson (Suriname)
Kyshenko defeated Simson by 3rd Round Majority Decision 2-0 (30-30, 30-28, 30-28).
K-1 World MAX Tournament Quarter Finals -70 kg: K-1 Rules / 3Min. 3R Ext.1R
(Japan) Masato def. Takayuki Kohiruimaki (Japan)
Masato defeated Kohiruimaki by 3rd Round Unanimous Decision 3-0 (30-28, 30-28, 30-28).
(Netherlands) Andy Souwer def. Virgil Kalakoda (South Africa)
Souwer defeated Kalakoda by TKO (Referee Stoppage, 3 Knockdowns) at 2:23 of the 3rd Round.
(Armenia) Gago Drago def. Albert Kraus (Netherlands)
Drago defeated Kraus by 3rd Round Unanimous Decision 3-0 (30-28, 30-28, 30-28).
(Thailand) Buakaw Por. Pramuk def. Yoshihiro Sato (Japan)
Por. Pramuk defeated Sato by KO (Left hook) at 0:18 of the 2nd Round.
Super Fight 1 –70 kg: K-1 Rules / 3Min. 3R Ext.1R
(Japan) Tatsuji def. Yasuhito Shirasu (Japan)
Tatsuji defeated Shirasu by 3rd Round Unanimous Decision 3-0 (30-28, 30-29, 30-28).
K-1 World MAX Tournament Semi Finals -70 kg: K-1 Rules / 3Min. 3R Ext.1R
(Netherlands) Andy Souwer def. Masato (Japan)
Souwer defeated Masato by 3rd Round Unanimous Decision 3-0 (30-29, 30-28, 30-28).
(Thailand) Buakaw Por. Pramuk def. Gago Drago (Armenia)
Por. Pramuk defeated Drago by 3rd Round Unanimous Decision 3-0 (30-27, 30-28, 30-27).
Super Fight 2 –70 kg: K-1 Rules / 3Min. 3R Ext.1R
(United States) Fernando Calleros def. Kozo Takeda (Japan)
Calleros defeated Takeda by 3rd Round Unanimous Decision 3-0 (28-26, 28-27, 28-26).
K-1 World MAX Tournament Final -70 kg: K-1 Rules / 3Min. 3R Ext.1R
(Thailand) Buakaw Por. Pramuk def. Andy Souwer (Netherlands)
Por. Pramuk defeated Souwer by KO (Punches) at 2:13 of the 2nd Round.

== See also ==
- List of K-1 events
- List of K-1 champions
- List of male kickboxers
