= Shunichi Shimizu =

Japanese mixed martial artist

- Born: January 31, 1985 (age 41); Tokyo, Japan
- Other names: Rolling Stone; Mr. SWAT! The Ironman of ZST
- Nationality: Japanese
- Height: 5 ft 6 in (1.68 m)
- Weight: 145 lb (66 kg; 10.4 st)
- Division: Flyweight; Bantamweight; Featherweight; Lightweight
- Team: Uruno Dojo
- Years active: 2005 - present

Mixed martial arts record
- Total: 87
- Wins: 40
- By knockout: 6
- By submission: 21
- By decision: 12
- By disqualification: 1
- Losses: 33
- By knockout: 5
- By submission: 8
- By decision: 20
- Draws: 12
- No contests: 2

Other information
- Mixed martial arts record from Sherdog

Shunichi Shimizu (清水 俊一, Shimizu Shun'ichi; born January 31, 1985) is a Japanese mixed martial arts and Lethwei fighter who currently competes in the bantamweight division.

== Career ==
Shimizu is a veteran of the Japanese mixed martial arts scene and primarily fought in Pancrase and ZST, the latter where he earned the nicknames Mr. SWAT! and the Ironman of ZST. Shimizu has also competed for Deep, GLADIATOR, Road Fighting Championship, Ultimate Fighting Championship and World Victory Road.

On February 21, 2018, Shimizu fought Tun Lwin Moe to a draw at Lethwei in Japan 7: Yuki under traditional Lethwei rules.

On November 14, 2018, Shimizu fought Makoto under Lethwei rules also known as BASTA at Lethwei in Japan 10 at the Korakuen Hall in Tokyo. Shimizu lost by TKO.

== Professional Lethwei record ==
Professional Lethwei record
0 wins, 0 losses, 1 draws
Date	Result	Opponent	Event	Location	Method	Round
2018-10-14	Loss	(Myanmar) Makoto aka BASTA	Lethwei in Japan 10	Tokyo, Japan	TKO	3
2018-02-21	Draw	(Myanmar) Tun Lwin Moe	Lethwei in Japan 7: Yuki	Tokyo, Japan	Draw	5
Legend: Win Loss Draw Notes

== Mixed martial arts record ==
Professional record breakdown
87 matches	40 wins	33 losses
By knockout	6	4
By submission	21	9
By decision	12	20
By disqualification	1	0
Draws	12	
No contests	2	

Res.	Record	Opponent	Method	Event	Date	Round	Time	Location	Notes
Loss	40–33–12 (2)	Takaya Takemoto	Submission (kimura)	Roots of Martial Arts Network 6	November 14, 2026	1	10:16	Ōta, Japan	
Win	40–32–12 (2)	Keisuke Hashimoto	KO (soccer kick)	Roots of Martial Arts Network 5	July 12, 2026	1	4:44	Tokyo, Japan	
Win	39–32–12 (2)	Xie Longlong	TKO (submission to punches)	Dragon FC: Longsan Fight – Day 2	December 21, 2025	2	N/A	Jinhua, China	Catchweight (141 lb) bout.
Loss	38–32–12 (2)	Trent Girdham	Decision (unanimous)	HEX Fight Series 37	November 22, 2025	3	5:00	Melbourne, Australia	
Loss	38–31–12 (2)	Erick Meneghin	Submission (triangle choke)	Roots of Martial Arts Network 3	October 11, 2025	1	6:26	Tokyo, Japan	
Loss	38–30–12 (2)	Semakadde Kakembo	Decision (unanimous)	HEX Fight Series 36	August 30, 2025	3	5:00	Melbourne, Australia	
Win	38–29–12 (2)	Rahmiddin Bekov	Decision (split)	Longsan Fight: China-Japan-Korea Competition	July 26, 2025	3	5:00	Jinhua, China	Bantamweight bout.
Loss	37–29–12 (2)	Justin van Heerden	Decision (unanimous)	HEX Fight Series 35	May 31, 2025	3	5:00	Melbourne, Australia	Return to Featherweight.
Win	37–28–12 (2)	Tomoya Omura	Submission (hammerlock)	Roots of Martial Arts Network 2	April 27, 2025	1	12:00	Tokyo, Japan	
Draw	36–28–12 (2)	Reo Hitomi	Draw (unanimous)	Shooto 2025 Opening Game	January 19, 2025	3	5:00	Tokyo, Japan	Return to Bantamweight.
Win	36–28–11 (2)	Gexi Pengchu	Submission (rear-naked choke)	Longsan Fight: China Cup International MMA Tournament	November 9, 2024	3	1:02	Guangzhou, China	Catchweight (139 lb) bout.
Draw	35–28–11 (2)	Daisuke Matsumoto	Draw (unanimous)	Roots of Martial Arts Network 1	October 14, 2024	2	5:00	Tokyo, Japan	
Win	35–28–10 (2)	Quàng Văn Minh	DQ (knee to groin)	Angel's FC 32 / HEAT 54	July 6, 2024	2	0:28	Vũng Tàu, Vietnam	An illegal knee to the groin rendered Shimizu unable to continue.
Loss	34–28–10 (2)	Song Young-jae	KO (punches)	Angel's FC 29	December 8, 2023	1	1:46	Vũng Tàu, Vietnam	For the interim AFC Featherweight Championship.
Win	34–27–10 (2)	Major Overall	Decision (unanimous)	SEAFC: Empire	November 5, 2023	3	5:00	Bangkok, Thailand	Won the SEAFC Masters Featherweight Championship.
Draw	33–27–10 (2)	Lee Hae-won	Draw (time limit)	Brawl International 3	October 13, 2023	2	5:00	Tumon Bay, Guam	For the vacant Brawl Bantamweight Championship.
Loss	33–27–9 (2)	Kim Min-woo	Decision (split)	Ring FC 2	June 17, 2023	3	5:00	Anseong, South Korea	
Loss	33–26–9 (2)	Yoo Joo-sang	Decision (unanimous)	Angel's FC 22	December 30, 2022	3	5:00	Ilsan, South Korea	Return to Featherweight.
Win	33–25–9 (2)	Jun Doi	Decision (split)	Gladiator 017 in Osaka	April 30, 2022	2	5:00	Osaka, Japan	
Loss	32–25–9 (2)	Seiji Akao	Decision (unanimous)	DEEP Osaka Impact 2021	April 4, 2021	3	5:00	Fukushima, Japan	
Loss	32–24–9 (2)	Takeya Takemoto	Decision (unanimous)	Gladiator 013 in Osaka	February 7, 2021	3	5:00	Toyonaka, Japan	For the Gladiator Bantamweight Championship.
Win	32–23–9 (2)	Takuya Ishibashi	Submission (leg scissor choke)	Chakuriki 6	May 17, 2020	1	3:58	Sakai, Japan	
Win	31–23–9 (2)	Masahiro Oishi	Submission (armbar)	Gladiator 012	February 23, 2020	2	4:48	Osaka, Japan	
Loss	30–23–9 (2)	Kosuke Terashima	Decision (unanimous)	DEEP 92 Impact	October 22, 2019	2	5:00	Tokyo, Japan	
Win	30–22–9 (2)	Ashkan Mokhtarian	Decision (unanimous)	HEX Fight Series 19	September 6, 2019	3	5:00	Melbourne, Australia	
NC	29–22–9 (2)	Mark Striegl	NC (accidental groin strike)	URCC 77: Raw Fury	April 27, 2019	2	N/A	Manila, Philippines	For the URCC MMA Featherweight Championship.
Loss	29–22–9 (1)	Takeshi Kasugai	Submission (guillotine choke)	HEAT 44	March 2, 2019	1	0:28	Nagoya, Japan	
Loss	29–21–9 (1)	Takuya Ogura	Decision (unanimous)	Global Fightingsports Game 1	July 1, 2018	3	5:00	Goshogawara, Japan	
Loss	29–20–9 (1)	Taiyo Hayashi	Decision (unanimous)	Pancrase 296	May 20, 2018	3	3:00	Tokyo, Japan	
Loss	29–19–9 (1)	Go Kashiwazaki	Decision (unanimous)	ZST 58: 15th Anniversary	November 25, 2017	2	5:00	Tokyo, Japan	
Win	29–18–9 (1)	Daiki Gojima	Decision (split)	Pancrase 290	October 8, 2017	3	3:00	Tokyo, Japan	
Win	28–18–9 (1)	Zhang Nanyan	Submission (triangle choke)	Chin Woo Men: 2016-2017 Season: Glory Gate	April 7, 2017	1	2:15	Guangzhou, China	
Loss	27–18–9 (1)	Mikael Silander	Decision (unanimous)	Cage 38	February 18, 2017	3	5:00	Helsinki, Finland	
Loss	27–17–9 (1)	Soo Chul Kim	Submission (armbar)	Road FC 035	December 10, 2016	2	3:49	Seoul, South Korea	
Loss	27–16–9 (1)	Alan Yoshihiro Yamaniha	Decision (split)	Pancrase 281	October 2, 2016	3	3:00	Tokyo, Japan	
Loss	27–15–9 (1)	Amurijirigala	Decision (unanimous)	Art of War 17	April 30, 2016	2	5:00	Beijing, China	
Loss	27–14–9 (1)	Tadahiro Harada	Submission (armbar)	Pancrase 276	March 13, 2016	2	2:09	Tokyo, Japan	Return to Bantamweight.
Loss	27–13–9 (1)	Xian Ji	TKO (spinning back kick and punches)	Bullets Fly FC 2	January 1, 2016	2	0:54	Beijing, China	Featherweight debut.
Loss	27–12–9 (1)	Yasutaka Koga	Technical Decision (split)	Pancrase 274	December 20, 2015	3	0:11	Fukuoka, Japan	
Draw	27–11–9 (1)	Rasul Tezekbayev	Draw	Alash Pride: The Golden Horde	October 17, 2015	3	5:00	Almaty, Kazakhstan	Bantamweight bout.
NC	27–11–8 (1)	Yusuke Ogikubo	NC (overturned)	Pancrase 270	October 4, 2015	3	5:00	Tokyo, Japan	Originally a unanimous decision win for Shimizu; later overturned by promoter due to illegal soccer kick.
Win	27–11–8	Hiroaki Ijima	Decision (split)	Pancrase 267	May 31, 2015	3	3:00	Tokyo, Japan	
Win	26–11–8	Toshihiro Komiya	Decision (unanimous)	Pancrase 264	February 1, 2015	3	3:00	Osaka, Japan	
Loss	25–11–8	Hiroki Yamashita	KO (punch)	Pancrase 261	October 5, 2014	2	2:59	Tokyo, Japan	
Loss	25–10–8	Yosuke Saruta	Decision (unanimous)	GRANDSLAM 1: Way of the Cage	July 13, 2014	3	5:00	Tokyo, Japan	Flyweight debut.
Loss	25–9–8	Kang Kyung-ho	Submission (arm-triangle choke)	UFC Fight Night: Saffiedine vs. Lim	January 4, 2014	3	3:53	Mariana Bay, Singapore	Kang was deducted 2 point in round one due to illegal elbows.
Win	25–8–8	Yuki Baba	Submission (armbar)	Pancrase 247	May 19, 2013	3	1:20	Tokyo, Japan	
Win	24–8–8	Keisuke Fujiwara	Decision (unanimous)	Fighting Network ZST 33: 10th Anniversary	November 23, 2012	3	5:00	Tokyo, Japan	
Win	23–8–8	Yuta Numakura	Submission (triangle choke)	Pancrase: Progress Tour 10	September 1, 2012	1	1:53	Tokyo, Japan	
Win	22–8–8	Toshihiro Shimizu	Submission (armbar)	Fighting Network ZST: Battle Hazard 6	July 16, 2012	2	1:30	Tokyo, Japan	
Win	21–8–8	Yerzhan Estanov	Submission (triangle choke)	Bushido Lithuania: vol. 51	June 8, 2012	2	1:45	Astana, Kazakhstan	
Loss	20–8–8	Motonobu Tezuka	Decision (unanimous)	Pancrase: Progress Tour 5	April 28, 2012	3	5:00	Tokyo, Japan	
Win	20–7–8	Rob McCrum	Submission (armbar)	Fighting Network ZST 31	March 17, 2012	1	1:23	Tokyo, Japan	
Win	19–7–8	Alan Yoshihiro Yamaniwa	Submission (triangle choke)	Rings Japan: Battle Genesis 9	January 22, 2012	3	1:15	Tokyo, Japan	
Loss	18–7–8	Kohei Kuraoka	Decision (unanimous)	Fighting Network ZST 30	November 23, 2011	2	5:00	Tokyo, Japan	
Win	18–6–8	Yoshitaka Abe	KO (head kick)	Fighting Network ZST 29	September 11, 2011	1	2:18	Tokyo, Japan	
Draw	17–6–8	Shigeki Osawa	Draw (time limit)	Fighting Network ZST: Battle Hazard 5	July 17, 2011	2	5:00	Tokyo, Japan	
Win	17–6–7	Masayuki Okude	KO (head kick)	Fighting Network ZST 28	May 22, 2011	1	1:30	Tokyo, Japan	
Win	16–6–7	Manabu Inoue	Decision (unanimous)	Sengoku 16: Soul of Fight	December 30, 2010	2	5:00	Tokyo, Japan	2010 Sengoku Bantamweight Grand Prix Semifinal.
Win	15–6–7	Wataru Takahashi	Decision (unanimous)	Sengoku 15	October 30, 2010	2	5:00	Tokyo, Japan	2010 Sengoku Bantamweight Grand Prix Quarterfinal.
Draw	14–6–7	Masamitsu Nakamura	Draw (time limit)	Fighting Network ZST: Swat! 36	August 15, 2010	2	5:00	Tokyo, Japan	
Win	14–6–6	Shin Katayama	Submission (kneebar)	Fighting Network ZST: Battle Hazard 4	July 3, 2010	1	4:13	Tokyo, Japan	
Draw	13–6–6	Tetsuya Yamada	Draw (time limit)	Fighting Network ZST 24	April 18, 2010	3	5:00	Tokyo, Japan	
Loss	13–6–5	Keisuke Fujiwara	Decision (unanimous)	Fighting Network ZST: Zst 23	February 20, 2010	5	5:00	Tokyo, Japan	
Win	13–5–5	Yasuo Munakata	Submission (kneebar)	Fighting Network ZST: Swat! 31	December 20, 2009	2	2:42	Tokyo, Japan	
Loss	12–5–5	Koichiro Matsumoto	Decision (unanimous)	Deep: 43 Impact	August 23, 2009	2	5:00	Tokyo, Japan	
Draw	12–4–5	Isamu Sugiuchi	Draw (time limit)	Fighting Network ZST: Swat! 24	April 5, 2009	2	5:00	Tokyo, Japan	
Win	12–4–4	Takeaki Miyakawa	Submission (armbar)	Fighting Network ZST 19	January 25, 2009	1	3:30	Tokyo, Japan	
Loss	11–4–4	Keisuke Fujiwara	KO (punch)	Fighting Network ZST 18: Sixth Anniversary	November 23, 2008	2	0:56	Tokyo, Japan	
Win	11–3–4	Tetsuya Nishi	Submission (armbar)	Fighting Network ZST: Swat! 21	October 5, 2008	2	0:45	Tokyo, Japan	
Win	10–3–4	Kosuke Sakai	Submission (triangle choke)	Fighting Network ZST: Swat! 20	September 7, 2008	2	1:30	Tokyo, Japan	
Win	9–3–4	Takahiro Ichijo	TKO (doctor stoppage)	Fighting Network ZST: Swat! 18	June 15, 2008	2	1:49	Tokyo, Japan	
Win	8–3–4	Kenichi Ito	KO (punch)	Fighting Network ZST 17	May 18, 2008	2	4:49	Tokyo, Japan	
Win	7–3–4	Yoshitaka Abe	Decision (unanimous)	Fighting Network ZST: Swat! 17	May 4, 2008	3	3:00	Tokyo, Japan	
Loss	6–3–4	Masanori Kanehara	Submission (armbar)	Fighting Network ZST 16	February 24, 2008	2	0:42	Tokyo, Japan	
Win	6–2–4	Kohei Kuraoka	Submission (neck scissors)	Fighting Network ZST: Swat! 15	December 23, 2007	1	4:36	Tokyo, Japan	
Win	5–2–4	Masanori Hirata	Submission (triangle choke)	Fighting Network ZST: Swat! 14	October 28, 2007	1	4:08	Tokyo, Japan	
Loss	4–2–4	Emerson Azuma	Submission (triangle choke)	Fighting Network ZST: Swat! 12	July 15, 2007	2	2:33	Tokyo, Japan	
Win	4–1–4	Kei Tanigawa	Submission (triangle choke)	Fighting Network ZST: Swat! 11	May 20, 2007	1	2:26	Tokyo, Japan	
Win	3–1–4	Kenichi Ito	Decision (unanimous)	Fighting Network ZST: Swat! 10	April 1, 2007	2	5:00	Tokyo, Japan	
Win	2–1–4	Masayuki Iida	Submission (armbar)	Fighting Network ZST: Swat! 8	December 17, 2006	1	1:31	Tokyo, Japan	
Draw	1–1–4	Yasutomo Tanaka	Draw (time limit)	Fighting Network ZST: Swat! 7	October 1, 2006	2	5:00	Tokyo, Japan	
Win	1–1–3	Akira Omura	Submission (armbar)	Fighting Network ZST: Swat! 6	August 27, 2006	2	1:17	Tokyo, Japan	
Draw	0–1–3	Tetsuya Nishi	Draw (time limit)	Fighting Network ZST: Swat! 5	June 4, 2006	2	5:00	Tokyo, Japan	
Draw	0–1–2	Shin Katayama	Draw (time limit)	Fighting Network ZST: Swat! 4	April 23, 2006	2	5:00	Tokyo, Japan	
Loss	0–1–1	Tetsuo Uehata	Submission (kneebar)	Fighting Network ZST: Swat! 3	October 23, 2005	1	0:24	Tokyo, Japan	
Draw	0–0–1	Tomoya Miyashita	Draw (time limit)	Fighting Network ZST: Swat! 2	July 24, 2005	2	5:00	Tokyo, Japan	Bantamweight debut.

== Submission grappling record ==
Result	Record	Opponent	Method	Event	Date	Round	Time	Location	Notes
Loss	0–1	(South Korea) Soo Chul Kim & Yoon Jun Lee	Submission (Guillotine choke)	ROAD FC 057	December 14, 2019	Ext	1:14	Seoul, South Korea	Japan vs. South Korea team Submission wrestling match. Teamed up with Takumi Nakayama. Shimizu faced Yoon Jun Lee in the 1st match and Nakayama faced Soo Chul Kim in the 2nd match, both ending in a 5-minute time-limit draw. In the extension round, Shimizu stepped up again but was defeated by Soo Chul Kim via submission.

== See also ==
- List of male mixed martial artists
