= Lim Hyun-gyu =

South Korean mixed martial artist (born 1985)

Lim Hyun-Gyu
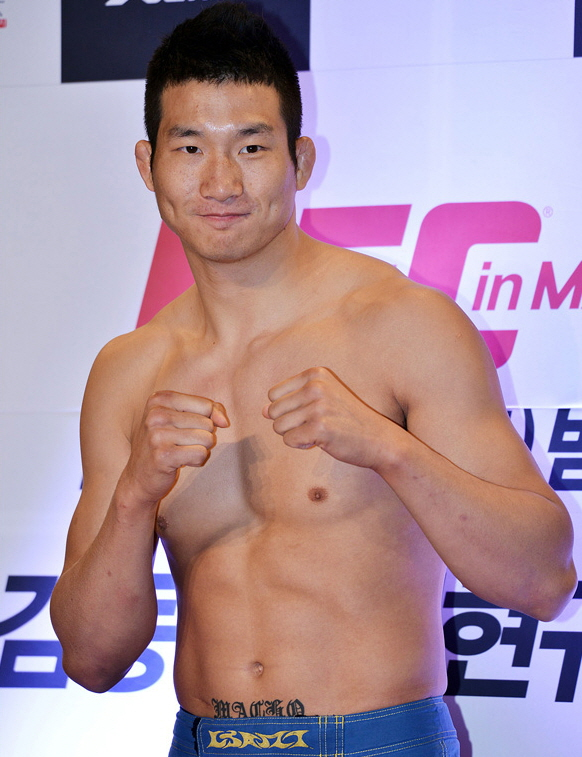
- Hyun-Gyu in 2012
- Born: January 16, 1985 (age 41)
- Other names: The Ace
- Nationality: South Korean
- Height: 6 ft 2 in (188 cm)
- Weight: 185 lb (84 kg; 13 st 3 lb)
- Division: Welterweight; Middleweight
- Reach: 77 in (196 cm)
- Style: Taekwondo, Boxing, Ssireum
- Stance: Orthodox
- Fighting out of: Seoul, South Korea
- Team: Team Macho
- Rank: Black belt in Taekwondo
- Years active: 2006–present

Mixed martial arts record
- Total: 22
- Wins: 14
- By knockout: 10
- By submission: 2
- By decision: 2
- Losses: 7
- By knockout: 2
- By submission: 2
- By decision: 3
- Draws: 1

Other information
- Mixed martial arts record from Sherdog
- Last updated on: December 5, 2013

Lim Hyun-Gyu (born January 16, 1985), often anglicized to Hyun Gyu Lim, is a South Korean mixed martial artist, who formerly competed in the UFC Welterweight division.

== Mixed martial arts career ==
=== Biography and early career ===
He first experienced martial arts when he was 13 years old training in Boxing, and started training in Taekwondo in his midteens. But these trainings were just as hobbies. So later he felt eagerness to pursue martial arts as a professional. After finishing a mandatory military service in his country, he was scouted by the head coach of his current team while training in his boxing gym. After only three months scouted, Lim made his professional MMA debut in February 2006 in the Spirit MC promotion in his native South Korea. Over the next few years, he also fought for the Heat, DEEP, M-1 Global and Pacific Xtreme Combat promotions. After beating Ryan Biglar at the PXC 32 event in July 2012, he became the PXC welterweight champion.

=== Ultimate Fighting Championship ===
In August 2012, the UFC announced that they had signed Lim. Lim was originally set to make his UFC debut against Marcelo Guimarães on November 10, 2012, at UFC on Fuel TV 6. However, Guimarães was forced out of the bout with an injury and replaced by David Mitchell. Then, just prior to the weigh in for the event, the bout was scrapped after Lim was declared medically unfit to compete by UFC doctors.

Lim vs. Guimarães was then rescheduled for March 3, 2013, at UFC on Fuel TV 8. Lim was successful in his debut, winning via KO in the second round.

Lim faced Pascal Krauss on August 31, 2013, at UFC 164. He defeated Krauss by KO with a knee and follow up punches in the first round. The win also earned Lim his first Fight of the Night bonus award.

Lim was expected to face Kiichi Kunimoto on January 4, 2014, at UFC Fight Night 34. However, in late November, event headliner Jake Ellenberger pulled out of the event citing an injury and Lim stepped up to face Tarec Saffiedine in the main event. He lost the fight via unanimous decision. Despite the loss on the scorecards, the bout brought Lim his second consecutive Fight of the Night bonus award.

Lim next faced Takenori Sato on September 20, 2014, at UFC Fight Night 52. He won the fight via TKO in the first round.

Lim faced Neil Magny on May 16, 2015, at UFC Fight Night 66. He lost the fight via TKO in the second round.

Lim was expected to face Dominique Steele on November 28, 2015, at UFC Fight Night 79. However, Lim pulled out of the fight in the week leading up to the event and was replaced by promotional newcomer Dong Hyun Kim.

Lim was expected to face Sultan Aliev on August 20, 2016, at UFC 202. However, Aliev pulled out of the fight in early August citing a wrist injury. Lim faced promotional newcomer Mike Perry. He lost the fight via TKO in the first round.

Lim faced Daichi Abe at UFC Fight Night 117 on September 23, 2017. He lost the fight by unanimous decision.

On October 23, 2018, it was reported that Lim was released from UFC.

=== Double G FC ===
On November 18, 2018, Lim faced Igor Svirid at Double G FC's inaugural event in Seoul, South Korea. He won the fight via unanimous decision.

== Championships and accomplishments ==
- Pacific Xtreme Combat
  - PXC Welterweight Championship (One time)
- Ultimate Fighting Championship
  - Fight of the Night (Two times)
  - UFC.com Awards
    - 2013: Ranked #5 Newcomer of the Year
- MMA Junkie
  - 2014 January Fight of the Month vs. Tarec Saffiedine
- Bleacher Report
  - 2014 #9 Ranked Fight of the Year vs. Tarec Saffiedine at UFC Fight Night: Saffiedine vs. Lim

== Mixed martial arts record ==
Professional record breakdown
22 matches	14 wins	7 losses
By knockout	10	2
By submission	2	2
By decision	2	3
Draws	1	

Res.	Record	Opponent	Method	Event	Date	Round	Time	Location	Notes
Win	14–7–1	Igor Svirid	Decision (unanimous)	Double G FC 1	November 18, 2018	3	5:00	Seoul, South Korea	Middleweight bout.
Loss	13–7–1	Daichi Abe	Decision (unanimous)	UFC Fight Night: Saint Preux vs. Okami	September 23, 2017	3	5:00	Saitama, Japan	
Loss	13–6–1	Mike Perry	TKO (punches)	UFC 202	August 20, 2016	1	3:38	Las Vegas, Nevada, United States	
Loss	13–5–1	Neil Magny	TKO (punches)	UFC Fight Night: Edgar vs. Faber	May 16, 2015	2	1:24	Pasay, Philippines	
Win	13–4–1	Takenori Sato	TKO (elbows)	UFC Fight Night: Hunt vs. Nelson	September 20, 2014	1	1:18	Saitama, Japan	
Loss	12–4–1	Tarec Saffiedine	Decision (unanimous)	UFC Fight Night: Saffiedine vs. Lim	January 4, 2014	5	5:00	Marina Bay, Singapore	Fight of the Night.
Win	12–3–1	Pascal Krauss	KO (knee and punches)	UFC 164	August 31, 2013	1	3:58	Milwaukee, Wisconsin, United States	Fight of the Night.
Win	11–3–1	Marcelo Guimarães	KO (knee and punches)	UFC on Fuel TV: Silva vs. Stann	March 3, 2013	2	4:00	Saitama, Japan	
Win	10–3–1	Ryan Biglar	Submission (guillotine choke)	Pacific Xtreme Combat 32	July 28, 2012	1	0:53	Mangilao, Guam	Won the PXC Welterweight Championship.
Win	9–3–1	Takahiro Kawanaka	TKO (corner stoppage)	Pacific Xtreme Combat 30	March 3, 2012	1	1:12	Mangilao, Guam	
Win	8–3–1	Ferrid Kheder	TKO (punches)	Pacific Xtreme Combat 27	October 29, 2011	1	N/A	Mangilao, Guam	
Win	7–3–1	Ross Ebanez	TKO (punches)	Pacific Xtreme Combat 26	August 20, 2011	1	1:44	Manila, Philippines	
Win	6–3–1	Slade Adelbai	TKO (punches)	Rites of Passage 8: Fearless	February 12, 2010	1	3:10	Saipan, Northern Mariana Islands	Middleweight bout.
Loss	5–3–1	Dmitry Samoilov	Decision (unanimous)	M-1 Challenge 12: USA	February 21, 2009	2	5:00	Tacoma, Washington, United States	Middleweight bout.
Loss	5–2–1	Max Fernandez	Submission (Achilles lock)	Heat 8	December 14, 2008	1	1:22	Tokyo, Japan	
Win	5–1–1	Brandon Magana	Submission (armbar)	M-1 Challenge 6: Korea	August 29, 2008	2	3:58	South Korea	Middleweight bout.
Win	4–1–1	Noboru Onishi	TKO (doctor stoppage)	Deep: 35 Impact	May 19, 2008	2	0:48	Tokyo, Japan	Middleweight bout.
Win	3–1–1	Lucio Linhares	KO (punch)	M-1 Challenge 2: Russia	April 3, 2008	1	0:17	Saint Petersburg, Russia	Middleweight bout.
Win	2–1–1	Hiroshi Masabuchi	TKO (punches)	Heat 6	March 30, 2008	1	3:47	Aichi, Japan	
Loss	1–1–1	Greg Soto	Submission (armbar)	World Best Fighter: USA vs. Asia	February 3, 2007	1	0:58	Atlantic City, New Jersey, United States	Welterweight debut.
Draw	1–0–1	Jick-Yong Kim	Draw	Spirit MC: Interleague 4	August 19, 2006	3	5:00	Seoul, South Korea	Spirit MC Middleweight (80kg) bout.
Win	1–0	Seong-Yeol Ahn	Decision (unanimous)	Spirit MC: Interleague 3	February 11, 2006	2	5:00	Seoul, South Korea	Spirit MC Middleweight (80kg) bout.

== See also ==
- List of current UFC fighters
- List of male mixed martial artists
