= Kang Kyung-ho =

South Korean mixed martial artist

Kang Kyung-Ho
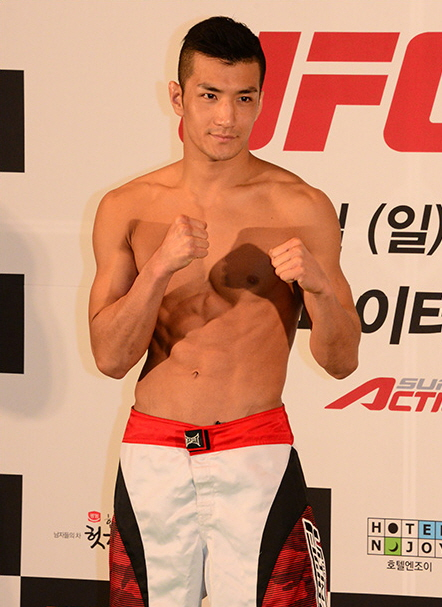
- Kang Kyung-Ho on February 22, 2013.
- Born: September 9, 1987 (age 39); Pusan, South Korea
- Native name: 강경호（姜京鎬）
- Other names: Mr. Perfect; Typhoon
- Height: 5 ft 9 in (175 cm)
- Weight: 135 lb (61 kg; 9 st 9 lb)
- Division: Bantamweight (2011–present); Featherweight (2009–2011); Lightweight (2007–2008)
- Reach: 72 in (183 cm)
- Style: Ssireum, BJJ, Taekwondo
- Fighting out of: Busan, South Korea
- Team: Busan Team M.A.D.
- Rank: Purple belt in Brazilian Jiu-Jitsu under Yang Sung-hoon
- Years active: 2007–present

Mixed martial arts record
- Total: 32
- Wins: 19
- By knockout: 2
- By submission: 12
- By decision: 5
- Losses: 12
- By knockout: 1
- By submission: 2
- By decision: 8
- By disqualification: 1
- No contests: 1

Other information
- University: Dong-Eui University
- Mixed martial arts record from Sherdog

- Korean name
- Hangul: 강경호
- Hanja: 姜京鎬
- RR: Gang Gyeongho
- MR: Kang Kyŏngho

Kang Kyung-ho (Korean: 강경호; born September 9, 1987), often anglicized Kyung Ho Kang, is a South Korean mixed martial artist who competed in the UFC's bantamweight division.

== Background ==
Kang started training Brazilian jiu-jitsu in 2006, proceeding rapidly to mixed martial arts. He graduated from Dong-Eui University, majoring in physical education and physiology.

== Career ==
Kang started his professional career in 2007. He fought mainly for international promotions, such as Spirit Martial Challenge, Art of War and DEEP.

=== Road Fighting Championship ===
Kang faced Shoko Sato in the quarterfinal match of ROAD FC bantamweight tournament on March 24, 2012, at Road FC 7. He won via submission due to an armbar in the second round.

In the semifinal on June 16, 2012, at Road FC 8, Kang faced Jae Hoon Moon. He won via submission due to a rear-naked choke in the second round. On the same day, Kang faced Andrew Leone in the final. Once again Kang won via submission due to a rear-naked choke in round two and was crowned the first-ever Road FC bantamweight champion.

In July 2012, it was announced that Kang had signed a contract to compete in the Bantamweight division of the Ultimate Fighting Championship.

=== Ultimate Fighting Championship ===
Kang was expected to face Alex Caceres on November 10, 2012, at UFC on Fuel TV: Franklin vs. Le. However, Kang was removed from the event due to injury and was replaced by promotional newcomer Motonobu Tezuka.

Kang/Caceres finally took place on March 3, 2013, at UFC on Fuel TV: Silva vs. Stann. Caceres originally won the fight via split decision, but the result was later changed to a no contest after Caceres tested positive for marijuana.

Kang faced Chico Camus on August 31, 2013, at UFC 164. He lost the fight via unanimous decision (29–28, 29–28, 30–27).

Kang faced Shunichi Shimizu on January 4, 2014, at UFC Fight Night: Saffiedine vs. Lim. He won the fight via submission due to an arm-triangle choke in the third round.

Kang was expected to face Chris Holdsworth on May 24, 2014, at UFC 173. However, Kang pulled out of the bout and was replaced by Chico Camus.

Kang faced Michinori Tanaka on September 20, 2014, at UFC Fight Night 52. He won the fight via split decision, and both fighters would earn Fight of the Night honors for their efforts.

Kang put a hold on his career to serve his two-year commitment for mandatory South Korean military service. In December 2017 he returned from hiatus to face Guido Cannetti on January 14, 2018, at UFC Fight Night: Stephens vs. Choi. He won the fight via submission in the first round.

Kang faced Ricardo Ramos on August 4, 2018, at UFC 227. He lost the fight by split decision.

Kang faced Teruto Ishihara on February 10, 2019, at UFC 234. He won the fight via a submission in round one.

Kang faced Brandon Davis on August 17, 2019, at UFC 241. He won the fight via split decision.

Kang faced Liu Pingyuan on December 21, 2019, at UFC on ESPN+ 23. He won the fight via split decision.

Kang was scheduled to face Rani Yahya on July 31, 2021, at UFC on ESPN 28. However the bout was cancelled a few hours before happening due to Yahya testing positive for COVID-19. The bout was ultimately rebooked to take place on November 20, 2021, at UFC Fight Night 198. He lost the bout via unanimous decision.

Kang was scheduled to face Saimon Oliveira on June 11, 2022, at UFC 275. However, Oliveira withdrew from the event for unknown reasons and he was replaced by Danaa Batgerel. He won the bout via unanimous decision.

Kang faced Cristian Quiñónez on June 17, 2023, at UFC on ESPN 47. He won the bout in the first round, submitting Cristian via rear-naked choke in the first round after knocking him down with a punch.

Kang was initially scheduled to face John Castañeda on November 18, 2023, at UFC Fight Night 232. However, the bout was shifted to take place one week earlier on November 11, 2023, at UFC 295. He lost the bout via unanimous decision.

Kang faced Muin Gafurov on June 22, 2024, at UFC on ABC 6. He lost the fight by unanimous decision.

On January 7, 2025, it was announced that Kang was released by the UFC.

== Personal life ==
Kang and his wife have a son (born 2022).

== Championships and accomplishments ==
=== Mixed martial arts ===
- ROAD Fighting Championship
  - ROAD FC bantamweight title (one time)
  - ROAD FC bantamweight tournament winner (2012)
- Spirit Martial Challenge
  - Go! Super-Korean season three winner
- Ultimate Fighting Championship
  - Fight of the Night (One time) vs. Michinori Tanaka
  - Tied (Aljamain Sterling, Mario Bautista & Marlon Vera) for third most submissions in UFC Bantamweight division history (4)

== Mixed martial arts record ==
Professional record breakdown
32 matches	19 wins	12 losses
By knockout	2	1
By submission	12	2
By decision	5	8
By disqualification	0	1
No contests	1	

Res.	Record	Opponent	Method	Event	Date	Round	Time	Location	Notes
Loss	19–12 (1)	Kim Jae-woong	Submission (rear-naked choke)	Black Combat 17	November 21, 2026	1	2:38	Seoul, South Korea	For the Black Combat Bantamweight Championship.
Loss	19–11 (1)	Muin Gafurov	Decision (unanimous)	UFC on ABC: Whittaker vs. Aliskerov	June 22, 2024	3	5:00	Riyadh, Saudi Arabia	
Loss	19–10 (1)	John Castañeda	Decision (unanimous)	UFC 295	November 11, 2023	3	5:00	New York City, New York, United States	Catchweight (138 lb) bout.
Win	19–9 (1)	Cristian Quiñónez	Submission (rear-naked choke)	UFC on ESPN: Vettori vs. Cannonier	June 17, 2023	1	2:25	Las Vegas, Nevada, United States	
Win	18–9 (1)	Danaa Batgerel	Decision (unanimous)	UFC 275	June 11, 2022	3	5:00	Kallang, Singapore	
Loss	17–9 (1)	Rani Yahya	Decision (unanimous)	UFC Fight Night: Vieira vs. Tate	November 20, 2021	3	5:00	Las Vegas, Nevada, United States	
Win	17–8 (1)	Liu Pingyuan	Decision (split)	UFC Fight Night: Edgar vs. The Korean Zombie	December 21, 2019	3	5:00	Busan, South Korea	
Win	16–8 (1)	Brandon Davis	Decision (split)	UFC 241	August 17, 2019	3	5:00	Anaheim, California, United States	
Win	15–8 (1)	Teruto Ishihara	Technical Submission (rear-naked choke)	UFC 234	February 10, 2019	1	3:59	Melbourne, Australia	
Loss	14–8 (1)	Ricardo Ramos	Decision (split)	UFC 227	August 4, 2018	3	5:00	Los Angeles, California, United States	
Win	14–7 (1)	Guido Cannetti	Submission (triangle choke)	UFC Fight Night: Stephens vs. Choi	January 14, 2018	1	4:53	St. Louis, Missouri, United States	
Win	13–7 (1)	Michinori Tanaka	Decision (split)	UFC Fight Night: Hunt vs. Nelson	September 20, 2014	3	5:00	Saitama, Japan	Fight of the Night. Tanaka tested positive for banned substances
Win	12–7 (1)	Shunichi Shimizu	Submission (arm-triangle choke)	UFC Fight Night: Saffiedine vs. Lim	January 4, 2014	3	3:53	Marina Bay, Singapore	Kang was deducted two point in round 1 due to illegal elbows.
Loss	11–7 (1)	Chico Camus	Decision (unanimous)	UFC 164	August 31, 2013	3	5:00	Milwaukee, Wisconsin, United States	
NC	11–6 (1)	Alex Caceres	NC (overturned)	UFC on Fuel TV: Silva vs. Stann	March 3, 2013	3	5:00	Saitama, Japan	Originally a split decision win for Caceres; overturned after he tested positive for marijuana.
Win	11–6	Andrew Leone	Submission (rear-naked choke)	Road FC 008	June 16, 2012	2	1:19	Wonju, South Korea	Won the 2012 Road FC Bantamweight Tournament and the inaugural Road FC Bantamweight Championship.
Win	10–6	Moon Jae-hoon	Submission (rear-naked choke)	Road FC 008	June 16, 2012	2	4:27	Wonju, South Korea	2012 Road FC Bantamweight Tournament Semifinal.
Win	9–6	Shoko Sato	Submission (armbar)	Road FC 007	March 24, 2012	2	2:38	Seoul, South Korea	2012 Road FC Bantamweight Tournament Quarterfinal.
Loss	8–6	Andrew Leone	Technical Decision (unanimous)	Road FC 006	February 5, 2012	3	5:00	Seoul, South Korea	
Win	8–5	Song Min-jung	Submission (armbar)	Road FC 005	December 3, 2011	1	4:55	Seoul, South Korea	
Win	7–5	Lee Kil-woo	TKO (corner stoppage)	Road FC 003	July 24, 2011	1	0:52	Seoul, South Korea	Bantamweight debut.
Loss	6–5	Kwon Bae-young	Submission (triangle armbar)	Road FC 002	April 16, 2011	1	4:05	Seoul, South Korea	
Win	6–4	Kazutoshi Fujita	Submission (rear-naked choke)	Grachan 5	November 7, 2010	1	2:10	Tokyo, Japan	
Loss	5–4	Munehiro Kin	DQ (knee to downed opponent)	Gladiator 11	October 9, 2010	1	4:56	Tokyo, Japan	
Win	5–3	Makoto Kamaya	Submission (rear-naked choke)	KOF: The Beginning of Legend	April 24, 2010	3	4:19	Jinju, South Korea	
Loss	4–3	Shigeki Osawa	Decision (unanimous)	World Victory Road Presents: Sengoku 12	March 7, 2010	3	5:00	Tokyo, Japan	
Loss	4–2	Atsushi Yamamoto	Decision (unanimous)	Deep: Fan Thanksgiving Festival 2	November 10, 2009	2	5:00	Tokyo, Japan	Catchweight (138 lb) bout.
Win	4–1	Ning Guangyou	Submission (triangle choke)	AOW 13	July 18, 2009	1	7:34	Beijing, China	Featherweight debut.
Win	3–1	Kim Nam-sun	TKO (doctor stoppage)	Spirit MC 17	June 29, 2008	1	4:08	Seoul, South Korea	
Loss	2–1	Lee Kwang-hee	KO (soccer kicks)	Spirit MC 14	January 20, 2008	1	2:45	Seoul, South Korea	For the Spirit MC Welterweight Championship (155 lb).
Win	2–0	Jang Duk-young	Submission (triangle choke)	Spirit MC 13	October 14, 2007	1	2:45	Seoul, South Korea	
Win	1–0	So Jae-hyun	Decision (unanimous)	Spirit MC 11	April 22, 2007	2	5:00	Seoul, South Korea	Lightweight debut.

== Filmography ==
=== Television show ===
Year	Title	Role	Ref.
2022	The First Business in the World	Contestant	

== See also ==
- List of male mixed martial artists
