= Tarec Saffiedine =

Belgian mixed martial arts fighter

- Born: 6 September 1986 (age 40); Brussels, Belgium
- Other names: Sponge
- Height: 5 ft 9 in (1.75 m)
- Weight: 170 lb (77 kg; 12 st)
- Division: Welterweight; Middleweight
- Reach: 70 1/2 in (179 cm)
- Stance: Southpaw
- Fighting out of: Temecula, California, United States
- Team: Tristar Gym; Team Quest; Evolve MMA; Tiger Muay Thai
- Rank: Black belt in Shihaishinkai Karate; Black belt in Brazilian Jiu-Jitsu
- Years active: 2007–2017

Mixed martial arts record
- Total: 23
- Wins: 16
- By knockout: 1
- By submission: 5
- By decision: 10
- Losses: 7
- By knockout: 1
- By submission: 0
- By decision: 6
- Draws: 0
- No contests: 0

Amateur kickboxing record
- Total: 14
- Wins: 12
- Losses: 1
- Draws: 1

Other information
- Mixed martial arts record from Sherdog

Tarec Robert Saffiedine (born 6 September 1986) is a Belgian former professional mixed martial artist who competed in the Welterweight division of the Ultimate Fighting Championship. A professional MMA competitor since 2007, Saffiedine has also formerly competed for DREAM and Strikeforce, and was the last Strikeforce Welterweight Champion.

== Background ==
Saffiedine was born to a Lebanese father, who emigrated to Belgium to study as an ophthalmologist, and a Belgian mother. His father was a Taekwondo practitioner, and since the age of ten Saffiedine has trained in Judo, Wing Chun and Taekwondo. Saffiedine grew up in Woluwe-Saint-Lambert in Brussels and also played basketball in his youth. Inspired by the Japanese comic book Tough, he finally took up Karate at age 16, and in 2005 received a black belt in Shihaishinkai, a style of knockdown karate that includes striking, throws and ground fighting. He also has an amateur kickboxing record of 12–1–1 and later began training in Brazilian Jiu-Jitsu and Muay Thai, and then Wrestling when he emigrated to the United States. Early in his career he worked a number of jobs including in a restaurant, a cinema, as a gardener, and a security guard. He received his nickname, "Sponge", from one of his coaches because he learns quickly. He is also known to switch stances frequently.

== Mixed martial arts career ==
=== Early career ===
Saffiedine made his professional mixed martial arts debut in March 2007, beating his opponent Guillaume Janvier with a kimura submission. He went on to fight a further three times that year, all in promotions in his native Belgium and France. In January 2008, he relocated to the United States and began training with Team Quest. His first fight since his trans-Atlantic move came in June that year at Ultimate Cage Wars 12 in Canada, where he defeated his opponent Rich Bondoc with an armbar submission. In 2009, he had two fights in the United States and won both.

=== DREAM ===
From there, Saffiedine went to Japan to compete in DREAM. His first fight came against Seichi Ikemoto at DREAM 10: Welterweight Grand Prix 2009 Final. The bout was not part of the Welterweight Grand Prix, but was a reserve bout. Saffiedine went on to win a unanimous decision.

His next opponent under the promotion's banner was Yoon Dong-Sik, which took place at DREAM 12. He replaced former WEC Middleweight Champion Paulo Filho in the match on short notice, and lost by way of split decision. Saffiedine normally competes as a Welterweight (170 lbs.), but since he was replacing Filho, he fought as a Middleweight (185 lbs.).

=== Strikeforce ===
He then returned to the United States to compete at Strikeforce Challengers: Kaufman vs. Hashi, where he defeated James Terry by way of unanimous decision. He used effective striking to keep his opponent off balance, going as far as to open a cut under Terry's left eye that was bleeding profusely by early in the third round. Though his opponent, an experienced wrestler, did attempt some takedowns, Saffiedine shrugged off most of them or got to his feet quickly when the action did hit the mat. All three judges scored the fight 30–27 in favor of Saffiedine.

Saffiedine was next scheduled to face off against Nate Moore on 21 May 2010 at Strikeforce Challengers: Lindland vs. Casey. The opening round provided some back-and-forth action with Moore pushing forward with a wrestling attack, then responding well when Saffiedine began to take control with his strikes. That changed in the second, as Moore returned to his takedown-heavy strategy, but Saffiedine stood tall in the face of the attack and delivered powerful punches while remaining on his feet. A well placed punch by Saffiedine ended the fight by knockout at 1:21 of the second round – his first career knockout win.

He then faced grappler Brock Larson on 11 September 2010 at Shark Fights 13, on loan from Strikeforce. After a minute-long feeling-out period, Larson shot out of the gate with punches and was dropped by a side-stepping Saffiedine's first strike. From there, Saffiedine continued to outstrike Larson and was also able to defend against takedowns for all three rounds. All judges scored the fight 30–27 in favour of Saffiedine as he won via unanimous decision.

Saffiedine's next fight was against Tyron Woodley at Strikeforce Challengers: Woodley vs. Saffiedine. He and Woodley squared off in the main event. He lost the fight via unanimous decision.

Saffiedine was supposed to face Evangelista Santos at Strikeforce: Feijao vs. Henderson but the fight was cancelled.

Saffiedine fought Scott Smith at Strikeforce: Fedor vs. Henderson. He was the replacement for Paul Daley, who was the original opponent for Saffiedine. He defeated Smith via unanimous decision.

Saffiedine fought Tyler Stinson to a split decision victory at Strikeforce: Rockhold vs. Jardine.

Saffiedine defeated Roger Bowling via unanimous decision at Strikeforce: Rousey vs. Kaufman.

In the last ever bout in Strikeforce history, Saffiedine utilized powerful leg kicks to win a 5-round unanimous decision against Nate Marquardt at Strikeforce: Marquardt vs. Saffiedine to become the final Strikeforce Welterweight Champion.

=== Ultimate Fighting Championship ===
It was announced shortly after the final Strikeforce event that Saffiedine would be amongst the promotion's former fighters brought over to the UFC.

Saffiedine was expected to face former EliteXC Middleweight Champion Robbie Lawler on 27 July 2013 at UFC on Fox 8. However, Saffiedine was forced out of the bout with an injury and was replaced by Siyar Bahadurzada. Bahadurzada also suffered an injury and was then replaced by Bobby Voelker.

Saffiedine was expected to face Jake Ellenberger on 4 January 2014 at UFC Fight Night 34. However, in late November, Ellenberger pulled out of the bout citing a hamstring injury and was replaced by Hyun Gyu Lim. Saffiedine won via unanimous decision. The win also earned Saffiedine his first Fight of the Night bonus award.

A fight with Jake Ellenberger was rebooked for UFC 172. However, Saffiedine had to pull out of the fight due to an undisclosed injury suffered in training.

Saffiedine faced Rory MacDonald on 4 October 2014 at UFC Fight Night: MacDonald vs. Saffiedine. After being out-struck the first two rounds, Saffiedine was finished for the first time in his career via TKO in the third round, as he was dropped by an uppercut and follow up punches leading to the stoppage.

A bout with Matt Brown was expected to take place on 14 February 2015 at UFC Fight Night 60. However, it was announced on 1 January 2015 that Saffiedine had pulled out of the bout, citing a groin injury.

After an extended hiatus spent rehabbing a litany of injuries, Saffiedine returned to face Jake Ellenberger on 30 January 2016 at UFC on Fox 18. He won the fight by unanimous decision.

Saffiedine faced Rick Story on 29 May 2016 at UFC Fight Night 88. He lost the fight by unanimous decision.

A pairing with Matt Brown was rescheduled, and was expected to take place on 30 December 2016 at UFC 207. However, Brown was pulled from the fight on 11 November in favor of a matchup with Donald Cerrone three weeks earlier at UFC 206. Saffiedine instead faced Dong Hyun Kim. Kim was awarded a split decision victory.

Saffiedine faced Rafael dos Anjos on 17 June 2017 at UFC Fight Night: Holm vs. Correia. He lost the fight via unanimous decision.

On 26 November 2019, it was reported that Saffiedine was released by the UFC.

== Championships and accomplishments ==
- Strikeforce
  - Strikeforce Welterweight Championship (One time, Last)
  - Fought the last fight in Strikeforce History
- Ultimate Fighting Championship
  - Fight of the Night (One time)
  - Performance of the Night (One time)
- MMA Junkie
  - 2014 January Fight of the Month vs. Hyun Gyu Lim
  - 2016 December Knockout of the Month vs. Dong Hyun Kim
- Bleacher Report
  - 2014 #9 Ranked Fight of the Year vs. Lim Hyun-gyu at UFC Fight Night: Saffiedine vs. Lim

== Mixed martial arts record ==
Professional record breakdown
23 matches	16 wins	7 losses
By knockout	1	1
By submission	5	0
By decision	10	6

Res.	Record	Opponent	Method	Event	Date	Round	Time	Location	Notes
Loss	16–7	Rafael dos Anjos	Decision (unanimous)	UFC Fight Night: Holm vs. Correia	17 June 2017	3	5:00	Kallang, Singapore	
Loss	16–6	Dong Hyun Kim	Decision (split)	UFC 207	30 December 2016	3	5:00	Las Vegas, Nevada, United States	
Loss	16–5	Rick Story	Decision (unanimous)	UFC Fight Night: Almeida vs. Garbrandt	29 May 2016	3	5:00	Las Vegas, Nevada, United States	
Win	16–4	Jake Ellenberger	Decision (unanimous)	UFC on Fox: Johnson vs. Bader	30 January 2016	3	5:00	Newark, New Jersey, United States	
Loss	15–4	Rory MacDonald	TKO (punches)	UFC Fight Night: MacDonald vs. Saffiedine	4 October 2014	3	1:28	Halifax, Nova Scotia, Canada	
Win	15–3	Hyun Gyu Lim	Decision (unanimous)	UFC Fight Night: Saffiedine vs. Lim	4 January 2014	5	5:00	Marina Bay, Singapore	Fight of the Night.
Win	14–3	Nate Marquardt	Decision (unanimous)	Strikeforce: Marquardt vs. Saffiedine	12 January 2013	5	5:00	Oklahoma City, Oklahoma, United States	Won the Strikeforce Welterweight Championship.
Win	13–3	Roger Bowling	Decision (unanimous)	Strikeforce: Rousey vs. Kaufman	18 August 2012	3	5:00	San Diego, California, United States	
Win	12–3	Tyler Stinson	Decision (split)	Strikeforce: Rockhold vs. Jardine	7 January 2012	3	5:00	Las Vegas, Nevada, United States	
Win	11–3	Scott Smith	Decision (unanimous)	Strikeforce: Fedor vs. Henderson	30 July 2011	3	5:00	Hoffman Estates, Illinois, United States	
Loss	10–3	Tyron Woodley	Decision (unanimous)	Strikeforce Challengers: Woodley vs. Saffiedine	7 January 2011	3	5:00	Nashville, Tennessee, United States	
Win	10–2	Brock Larson	Decision (unanimous)	Shark Fights 13: Jardine vs Prangley	11 September 2010	3	5:00	Amarillo, Texas, United States	
Win	9–2	Nate Moore	KO (punch)	Strikeforce Challengers: Lindland vs. Casey	21 May 2010	2	1:21	Portland, Oregon, United States	
Win	8–2	James Terry	Decision (unanimous)	Strikeforce Challengers: Kaufman vs. Hashi	26 February 2010	3	5:00	San Jose, California, United States	Return to Welterweight.
Loss	7–2	Yoon Dong-Sik	Decision (split)	DREAM 12	25 October 2009	3	5:00	Osaka, Japan	Middleweight bout.
Win	7–1	Seichi Ikemoto	Decision (unanimous)	DREAM 10	20 July 2009	2	5:00	Saitama, Japan	
Win	6–1	Mike Arellano	Submission (americana)	War Gods 5	30 May 2009	1	2:44	Alpine, California, United States	
Win	5–1	Scott Rose	Submission (arm-triangle choke)	Long Beach Fight Night 4	19 April 2009	1	0:58	Long Beach, California, United States	
Win	4–1	Rich Bondoc	Submission (armbar)	Ultimate Cage Wars 12	27 June 2008	1	2:18	Winnipeg, Manitoba, Canada	
Win	3–1	Raymond Jarman	Decision (unanimous)	Shooto Belgium: Encounter the Braves	15 December 2007	3	5:00	Charleroi, Belgium	
Win	2–1	Sebastian Grandin	Submission (armbar)	Xtreme Gladiators 3	9 June 2007	1	2:38	Paris, France	
Loss	1–1	Kamil Uygun	Decision (unanimous)	Night of the Gladiators	21 April 2007	2	5:00	Brakel, Belgium	
Win	1–0	Guillaume Janvier	Submission (kimura)	Shooto Belgium: Consecration	31 March 2007	1	1:15	Charleroi, Belgium	

== See also ==
- List of current UFC fighters
- List of Strikeforce alumni
- List of male mixed martial artists

Preceded by Nate Marquardt	3rd and final Strikeforce Welterweight Champion; 12 January 2013 – 12 January 2013	Vacant Strikeforce banner dissolved into UFC
