= Pascal Krauss =

German mixed martial arts fighter

- Born: April 19, 1987 (age 39); Breisach, West Germany (now Breisach, Germany)
- Other names: Panzer
- Nationality: German
- Height: 6 ft 1 in (1.85 m)
- Weight: 170 lb (77 kg; 12 st)
- Division: Welterweight (MMA)
- Reach: 74.0 in (188 cm)
- Style: Boxing, Brazilian Jiu-Jitsu, Judo, Freestyle Wrestling
- Fighting out of: Milwaukee, Wisconsin, U.S.
- Team: Roufusport
- Rank: Black belt in Brazilian Jiu-Jitsu; Black belt in Judo
- Years active: 2008–2013

Mixed martial arts record
- Total: 13
- Wins: 11
- By knockout: 2
- By submission: 7
- By decision: 2
- Losses: 2
- By knockout: 1
- By decision: 1

Other information
- Website: www.PascalKrauss.com
- Mixed martial arts record from Sherdog

Pascal "Panzer" Krauss (born April 19, 1987) is a German retired mixed martial artist who competed in the welterweight division of the Ultimate Fighting Championship (UFC). His German nickname translates to 'tank' in English.

== Early life and education ==
Krauss was born on April 19, 1987, in Breisach, West Germany. He developed an interest for martial arts was woken when he started boxing at the age of 14. His five-year commitment to the sport earned him a German junior boxing title and a second place in the International German Championships. The latter being the only loss in his 18-fight amateur boxing career. He was also a member in the youth team of Freiburg's first division wrestling club 'RKG Freiburg 2000'. Krauss studied sport science at the University of Freiburg.

== Career ==
=== Mixed martial arts ===
After an encounter with German Judo black belt and MMA practioneer Gregor Herb in 2007 Pascal also started training Brazilian Jiu-Jitsu (BJJ) and MMA. He made his professional MMA debut in January 2008 in his native Germany.

In 2009, Pascal spent some time in Rio de Janeiro, Brazil, to train under BJJ master Roberto “Gordo” Correa. After eight weeks of training alongside Antonio Braga Neto, Rafael dos Anjos, Delson Heleno and MMA-legend Vitor Belfort, amongst others, he was awarded a BJJ blue belt. A 2010 trip to the United States lead Pascal to spend some time at Renzo Gracie's MMA academy in New York City and the Cesar Gracie MMA team - home to renowned fighters such as Jake Shields, Nick Diaz, Nate Diaz and Gilbert Melendez.

After beating John Quinn at the May 22, 2010 Cage Warriors Fighting Championship Right to Fight event he became the Cage Warriors welterweight champion. He succeeded Dan Hardy, who had to vacate the title after signing with the UFC in 2008.

The MMA-website Sherdog released an interview with Pascal on July 24 for their "Prospect Watch"-column. Sherdog also named him in a July 2010 article on 'the top 10 undefeated European prospects'.

==== Ultimate Fighting Championship ====
In August 2010, Pascal signed a four-fight contract with the Ultimate Fighting Championship. He was expected to make his promotional debut at UFC 122 in Oberhausen, Germany against the likewise undefeated Kenny Robertson. In mid October, Robertson backed out of the fight due to injury and was replaced by fellow undefeated UFC newcomer Mark Scanlon. Krauss won via unanimous decision.

Krauss was expected to face John Hathaway on November 5, 2011, at UFC 138. However, Krauss pulled out of the bout citing a shoulder injury, and was replaced by Matt Brown.

Krauss/Hathaway eventually took place on May 5, 2012, at UFC on Fox 3. Krauss lost the fight via unanimous decision.

Krauss was expected to face UFC newcomer Gunnar Nelson on September 29, 2012, at UFC on Fuel TV 5. However, Krauss was forced to pull out of the fight after he received a strong knee strike to the ribcage while sparring and had to be rushed to the hospital after complaining of chest pain. Doctors at Freiburg University Hospital diagnosed him with severely bruised ribs, an inflamed chest muscle and a dislocated vertebra, rendering Krauss unable to compete and was replaced on the card by DaMarques Johnson.

Krauss faced Mike Stumpf on January 26, 2013, at UFC on Fox 6. He won the fight via unanimous decision.

Krauss faced Hyun Gyu Lim on August 31, 2013, at UFC 164. He lost by KO in the first round. Despite the loss, the fight earned Krauss his second Fight of the Night bonus award.

Krauss was expected to face promotional newcomer Adam Khaliev on January 25, 2014, at UFC on Fox 10. However, the bout was scrapped in the weeks leading up to the event as Khaliev had not been granted clearance for the fight.

== Championships and accomplishments ==
- Cage Warriors
  - Cage Warriors Welterweight Championship (One time)
- Ultimate Fighting Championship
  - Fight of the Night (Two times)

== Mixed martial arts record ==
Professional record breakdown
13 matches	11 wins	2 losses
By knockout	2	1
By submission	7	0
By decision	2	1

Res.	Record	Opponent	Method	Event	Date	Round	Time	Location	Notes
Loss	11–2	Hyun Gyu Lim	KO (knee and punches)	UFC 164	August 31, 2013	1	3:58	Milwaukee, Wisconsin, United States	Fight of the Night.
Win	11–1	Mike Stumpf	Decision (unanimous)	UFC on Fox: Johnson vs. Dodson	January 26, 2013	3	5:00	Chicago, Illinois, United States	
Loss	10–1	John Hathaway	Decision (unanimous)	UFC on Fox: Diaz vs. Miller	May 5, 2012	3	5:00	East Rutherford, New Jersey, United States	
Win	10–0	Mark Scanlon	Decision (unanimous)	UFC 122	November 13, 2010	3	5:00	Oberhausen, Germany	Fight of the Night.
Win	9–0	John Quinn	Submission (rear-naked choke)	Cage Warriors 37: Right to Fight	May 22, 2010	2	4:47	Birmingham, United Kingdom	Won the vacant Cage Warriors Welterweight Championship.
Win	8–0	Srdjan Sekulic	TKO (punches)	WFC 9: Restart	December 20, 2009	2	2:24	Ljubljana, Slovenia	
Win	7–0	Mehdi Mahouche	Submission (rear-naked choke)	Fight Night Freiburg 2	October 10, 2009	1	4:23	Freiburg, Germany	
Win	6–0	Gökmen Dali	Submission (D'Arce choke)	Shooto: Switzerland 6	September 19, 2009	2	4:33	Zurich, Switzerland	
Win	5–0	Dominique Stetefeld	Submission (rear-naked choke)	La Onda: Fight Night Special 3	August 23, 2009	1	1:09	Halberstadt, Germany	
Win	4–0	Kamil Lipinski	TKO (punches)	Hamburger Käfig: Second Strike	March 1, 2009	2	2:33	Hamburg, Germany	
Win	3–0	Kristian Ozimec	Submission (rear-naked choke)	Fight Night Freiburg	December 6, 2008	1	3:24	Freiburg, Germany	
Win	2–0	Michael Heist	Submission (americana)	Gorilla Fight 2	April 5, 2008	1	4:45	Mannheim, Germany	
Win	1–0	Manuel Sagmeister	Submission (kimura)	This is Shido 3	January 27, 2008	1	3:30	Lossburg, Germany	

== See also ==
- List of current UFC fighters
- List of male mixed martial artists
