= Mosab Amrani =

Dutch martial artist

- Born: October 25, 1987 (age 38); Amsterdam, Netherlands
- Other names: Jaguar
- Nationality: Dutch; Moroccan
- Height: 1.70 m (5 ft 7 in)
- Weight: 65 kg (143 lb; 10.2 st)
- Division: Featherweight; Lightweight
- Reach: 67.7 in (172 cm)
- Style: Muay Thai
- Stance: Orthodox
- Fighting out of: Rabat, Morocco
- Team: Team Amrani
- Trainer: Team Amrani
- Years active: 2003-2016

Kickboxing record
- Total: 72
- Wins: 55
- By knockout: 18
- Losses: 13
- By knockout: 0
- Draws: 4
- Last updated on: June 29, 2014

Mosab "Jaguar" Amrani (born 25 October 1987 in Amsterdam, Netherlands), is a Moroccan-Dutch former Featherweight-Lightweight Muay Thai kickboxer fighting out of Morocco for Team Amrani.

== Biography/Career ==
Born in Amsterdam, Mosab began most of his early career fighting at around the 61 kg mark on the local scene in the Netherlands and became one of the countries top prospects in the lower weight classes. He made the transition up in weight to 63.5 kg and made his first impact on the international Muay Thai scene by defeating the legendary Anuwat Kaewsamrit via technical knockout at a SLAMM!! event in 2008 to win his first major honour - the W.M.C. world title.

He held on to his W.M.C. world belt for just seven months when he lost his first title defence against the highly decorated Andrei Kulebin at the Champions of Champions II event in Jamaica. Mosab made up for this disappointment in the Autumn of 2009 when he beat one of the world's top Muay Thai fighters, Bovy Sor Udomson, to win the W.M.C. intercontinental title, stopping him in the first round in an extremely impressive victory.

Recently Mosab moved up to the 70 kg division. Under the It's Showtime organization, he has beaten the experienced Chris van Venrooij and dropped a decision in what was a contender for 'fight of the year' against close friend Mohammed Khamal at the end of 2010.

Amrani knocked out Liam Harrison with a liver punch in round one at Glory 5: London on March 23, 2012.

He fought in the eight-man, 65 kg tournament at Glory 8: Tokyo - 2013 65kg Slam in Tokyo, Japan on May 3, 2013. After outpointing Marcus Vinicius in the quarter-finals, he was defeated by Masaaki Noiri via unanimous decision in the semis.

He defeated Yuta Kubo by unanimous decision at Glory 13: Tokyo - Welterweight World Championship Tournament in Tokyo, Japan on December 21, 2013.

He defeated Lim Chi-bin at Qabala Fight Series #1 in Qabala, Azerbaijan on June 29, 2014, dropping the Korean with a knee to the body before finishing him a kick to the same spot shortly after.

== Titles ==
- 2009 W.M.C. featherweight intercontinental champion -63.5 kg
- 2009 W.M.C. featherweight world champion -63 kg (0 title defences)
- 2015 Glory Featherweight Contender Tournament winner

== Kickboxing record ==
Kickboxing record
55 wins (18 (T)KOs), 13 losses, 4 draws
Date	Result	Opponent	Event	Location	Method	Round	Time
2016-12-10	Loss	(France) Fabio Pinca	Glory 36: Oberhausen	Oberhausen, Germany	Decision (split)	3	3:00
2016-03-12	Loss	(Ukraine) Serhiy Adamchuk	Glory 28: Paris	Paris, France	Decision (unanimous)	5	3:00
For the Glory Featherweight Championship.
2015-12-04	Win	(Brazil) Maykol Yurk	Glory 26: Amsterdam - Featherweight Contender Tournament, Final	Amsterdam, Netherlands	KO	1	1:51
Wins the Glory Featherweight Contender Tournament.
2015-12-04	Win	(South Korea) Lim Chi-bin	Glory 26: Amsterdam - Featherweight Contender Tournament, Semi Finals	Amsterdam, Netherlands	KO	1	1:32
2015-11-07	Loss	(China) Qiu Jianliang	Wulinfeng World Championship	Shenyang, China	TKO (doctor stoppage)	2	0:00
2015-04-03	Loss	(Canada) Gabriel Varga	Glory 20: Dubai	Dubai, UAE	Decision (unanimous)	5	3:00
For the inaugural Glory Featherweight Championship.
2014-11-30	Loss	(Japan) Hiroaki Suzuki	SHOOT BOXING WORLD TOURNAMENT S-cup 2014, Semi Final	Tokyo, Japan	Decision (majority)	3	3:00
2014-11-30	Win	(Japan) Akiyo Nishiura	SHOOT BOXING WORLD TOURNAMENT S-cup 2014, Quarter Final	Tokyo Japan	Decision (unanimous)	3	3:00
2014-06-29	Win	(South Korea) Lim Chi-bin	Qabala Fight Series #1	Qabala, Azerbaijan	KO (left body kick)	1	1:28
2013-12-21	Win	(Japan) Yuta Kubo	Glory 13: Tokyo	Tokyo, Japan	Decision (unanimous)	3	3:00
2013-05-03	Loss	(Japan) Masaaki Noiri	Glory 8: Tokyo - 65 kg Slam Tournament, Semi Finals	Tokyo, Japan	Decision (unanimous)	3	3:00
2013-05-03	Win	(Brazil) Marcus Vinicius	Glory 8: Tokyo - 65 kg Slam Tournament, Quarter Finals	Tokyo, Japan	Decision (unanimous)	3	3:00
2013-03-23	Win	(England) Liam Harrison	Glory 5: London	London, England	KO (body punch)	1	1:20
2011-11-27	Loss	(France) Fabio Pinca	Thai Fight 2011 67 kg Tournament, Semi Final	Bangkok, Thailand	Decision	3	3:00
2011-09-25	Win	(Morocco) Ibrahim Chiahou	Thai Fight 2011 67 kg Tournament, Quarter Final	Bangkok, Thailand	Decision	3	3:00
2011-07-18	Loss	(South Korea) Lim Chi-bin	REBELS 8 & It's Showtime Japan	Tokyo, Japan	Ext.R decision (unanimous)	4	3:00
Fight will be for It's Showtime 65MAX top contender spot to face the current 65MAX champion Orono Wor Petchpun.
2011-05-14	Loss	(Algeria) Houcine Bennoui	It's Showtime 2011 Lyon	Lyon, France	TKO (injury)	4	
2011-02-19	Win	(Turkey) Fatih Ozkan	Badboys	Utrecht, Netherlands	Decision (unanimous)	3	3:00
2010-12-18	Loss	(Morocco) Mohammed Khamal	Fightclub presents: It's Showtime 2010	Amsterdam, Netherlands	Ext.R decision (4–1)	4	3:00
2010-09-24	Win	(Russia) Evgeniy Kurovskoy	FNFN @ The Sand	Amsterdam, Netherlands	Decision	3	3:00
2010-09-12	Win	(Netherlands) Chris van Venrooij	Fightingstars presents: It's Showtime 2010	Amsterdam, Netherlands	Decision (5–0)	3	3:00
2010-02-27	Win	(Morocco) Abid Boudhan	Amsterdam Fight Club	Amsterdam, Netherlands	Decision	5	3:00
2009-11-29	Win	(Thailand) Bovy Sor Udomson	SLAMM "Nederland vs Thailand VI"	Almere, Netherlands	KO	1	
Wins W.M.C. featherweight intercontinental title -63.5 kg.
2009-06-09	Loss	(Belarus) Andrei Kulebin	Champions of Champions II	Montego Bay, Jamaica	Decision (unanimous)	5	3:00
Loses W.M.C. featherweight world title -63 kg.
2009-04-09	Win	(Netherlands) Reuben Narain	Amsterdam Fight Club	Amsterdam, Netherlands	Decision	5	3:00
2009-03-01	Win	(Netherlands) Robert van Nimwegen	K-1 World MAX 2009 Europe, Super Fight	Utrecht, Netherlands	Decision (unanimous)	3	3:00
2008-11-30	Win	(Thailand) Anuwat Kaewsamrit	SLAMM "Nederland vs Thailand V"	Almere, Netherlands	TKO (doc. stop/cut)	4	1:52
Wins W.M.C. featherweight world title -63 kg.
2008-09-21	Win	(Sweden) Martin Akhtar	SLAMM "Back to the Old Skool"	Amsterdam, Netherlands	Decision	5	3:00
2007-11-07	Win	(Suriname) Rodney Doorje	Morocco vs Suriname	Netherlands	Decision	5	3:00
2007-06-02	Win	(Netherlands) Arjum Muradian	Muaythai Gala "Best of West", Sporthal Aristos	Amsterdam, Netherlands	Decision	5	3:00
2006-11-19	Win	(Ghana) Richard Asare	Rumble of Amsterdam IV	Amsterdam, Netherlands	Decision	5	3:00
2006-09-24	Draw	(Netherlands) Derryl Misiedjan	Muaythai Gala Zonnehuis	Amsterdam, Netherlands	Decision draw	5	3:00
2006-05-27	Win	(Netherlands) Samuel Wia	Beatdown	Amsterdam, Netherlands	Decision	5	3:00
2006-03-18	Win	(Suriname) Rodney Doorje	Beatdown, Zonnehuis	Amsterdam, Netherlands	Decision (unanimous)	5	3:00
2005-11-20	Win	(Morocco) Nordin Kassrioui	Event Plaza II	Rijswijk, Netherlands	Decision	5	2:00
2005-04-23	Win	(Netherlands) Charlton Gijsbertha	N.K.A. Youth Cup, Semi Finals -63.5 kg	Amsterdam, Netherlands	Decision	4	2:00
Despite victory, has to withdraw from tournament.
2005-02-27	Loss	(England) Jordan Watson	Master Sken's Fight Night	Manchester, England, UK	TKO (cut/elbow)	4	
2005-02-19	Win	(Morocco) Hamza Rahmani	Test of Talent 4	Mortsel, Belgium	Decision	5	2:00
2004-12-18	Win	(Denmark) Mohamed El-Mir	El Otmani Gym Gala, Sporthal Jan van Galen	Amsterdam, Netherlands	Decision	5	2:00
2004-12-03	Win	(Turkey) Mustafa Gunes	Muay Thai Gala	Katwijk, Netherlands	TKO (gave up)	1	
2004-10-10	Loss	(Morocco) Chafik Salahedine	Jellema	Netherlands	Decision		
2004-06-05	Draw	(Morocco) Youssouf Aknenni		Netherlands	Decision draw	5	2:00
2004-04-24	Win	(Netherlands) Kees Vergouwen	Fight Club, Wellness Profi Center	Purmerend, Netherlands	Decision	5	2:00
2004-04-12	Draw	(France) Ben Simmed	Morocco Earthquake Benefit Gala	Amsterdam, Netherlands	Decision draw	5	2:00
2004-?-?	Win	(England) Phil Ireland			KO		
2003-11-23	Win	(Turkey) Kazim Celen	Veni Vici Vedi II	Veenendaal, Netherlands	TKO (doctor stoppage)		
2003-11-02	Draw	(Morocco) Adil Ait Ali	Immortality	Netherlands	Decision draw	3	2:00
2003-02-02	Win	(Morocco) Said Lahri	Killer Dome II	Amsterdam, Netherlands	Decision	2	1:30
Legend: Win Loss Draw/no contest Notes

== See also ==
- List of K-1 events
- List of It's Showtime events
- List of male kickboxers
