= Remigijus Morkevičius =

Lithuanian kickboxer and MMA fighter

- Born: Remigijus Morkevičius; 10 August 1982; Kaunas, Lithuanian SSR, Soviet Union
- Died: 21 December 2016 (aged 34); Kaunas, Lithuania; Gunshot
- Other names: Remyga, Maklaudas
- Height: 5 ft 6 in (1.68 m)
- Weight: 143 lb (65 kg; 10.2 st)
- Division: Featherweight
- Style: Kickboxing
- Stance: Southpaw
- Fighting out of: Garliava, Lithuania
- Team: Titanas Gym
- Years active: 2000–2015

Kickboxing record
- Total: 13
- Wins: 10
- By knockout: 7
- Losses: 2
- By knockout: 2
- Draws: 1

Mixed martial arts record
- Total: 21
- Wins: 16
- By knockout: 12
- By submission: 4
- Losses: 5
- By knockout: 1
- By submission: 3
- By decision: 1

Other information
- Mixed martial arts record from Sherdog

Remigijus Morkevičius (10 August 1982 – 21 December 2016) was a Lithuanian mixed martial artist and kickboxer. He has fought for the Lithuanian branch of RINGS, ZST, and K-1 World MAX.

== Career and biography ==
Morkevičius began kickboxing and Muay Thai at age of 12. He started off his career in Lithuania as a kickboxer becoming a national champion in both kickboxing and Muay Thai. He transitioned across to MMA in 2002 defeating Darius Baliulis at a local event. This win led to his being signed by Japanese promotion ZST and he would make a quick impact in Japan, knocking out his first four opponents in brutal fashion (mostly with his trademark knees) and qualifying for the 2004 ZST Grand Prix where he would suffer his first MMA defeat to Marcus Aurélio in the Semi Finals.

Morkevičius would continue to have success with the ZST promotion, bar a couple of submission defeats, culminating in his victory at the 2005 ZST Grand Prix 2 where he defeated Masahiro Oishi by knockout to win the featherweight title. Morkevičius later signed with Hero's where he would becoming increasingly re-involved in the kickboxing world with K-1 MAX.

Morkevičius' first foray into K-1 MAX began at the 2005 K-1 MAX Champions Challenge where he defeated local fighter Yasuhiro Kazuya. Morkevičius would have great initial success, winning his first four fights (including an 8-second stoppage of Shingo Garyu) and earned a shot at qualification for the 2006 K-1 MAX World Final at the 2006 K-1 MAX World Open. He faced legendary Japanese fighter Masato at this event but was unable to qualify, losing instead by technical knockout in the second round. After this defeat his kickboxing career would go on the backburner for a while as he refocused back on MMA.

Morkevičius had mixed success with Hero's, winning 2 and losing 2 before returning to ZST in 2006. Additionally, problems outside of the ring have limited his fighting opportunities as of late. A return to K-1 MAX in 2008 has resulted in varying results, a crushing knockout defeat to Andre Dida.

== Death ==
On December 21, 2016, Morkevičius was shot seven times with an automatic rifle, near his home in Kaunas, County Šilainiai, Lithuania. His body was found on the steps of the front doors of the apartment complex where he was living. The murder occurred on Wednesday, by an unidentified man waiting for him in the car. On January 20, 2025, the Estonian Imre Arakas was sentenced in the Kaunas regional court for his murder.

== Titles ==
- 2005 ZST-Grand Prix 2 Featherweight champion
- BUSHIDO Lithuania Muay Thai champion
- BUSHIDO Lithuania Kickboxing champion

== Mixed martial arts record ==
Professional record breakdown
| 21 matches | 16 wins | 5 losses |
| By knockout | 12 | 1 |
| By submission | 4 | 3 |
| By decision | 0 | 1 |
| By disqualification | 0 | 0 |
| Draws | 0 | |
| No contests | 0 | |

| Res. | Record | Opponent | Method | Event | Date | Round | Time | Location | Notes |
|---|---|---|---|---|---|---|---|---|---|
| Win | 16-5 | (Japan) Wataru Inatsu | KO (punches) | ZST 9 - The Battle Field 9 | February 18, 2006 | 1 | 1:15 | Tokyo, Japan | |
| Loss | 15-5 | (Japan) Katsuhiko Nagata | Decision (unanimous) | K-1 PREMIUM 2005 Dynamite!! | December 31, 2005 | 2 | 5:00 | Osaka, Japan | |
| Win | 15-4 | (Georgia (country)) Ramazi Jakharydze | KO (head kick) | Hero's Lithuania 2005 | November 19, 2005 | 1 | N/A | Vilnius, Lithuania | |
| Loss | 14-4 | (Japan) Hiroyuki Takaya | TKO (punches) | Hero's 3 | October 23, 2005 | 2 | 4:16 | Tokyo, Japan | Hero's 2005 Lightweight Grand Prix quarter-final. |
| Win | 14-3 | (Japan) Takehiro Murahama | KO (left hook) | Hero's 2 | July 6, 2005 | 1 | 1:14 | Tokyo, Japan | |
| Win | 13-3 | (Netherlands) Danny van Bergen | Submission (armbar) | Shooto Lithuania - Chaosas | April 7, 2005 | 1 | N/A | Vilnius, Lithuania | |
| Win | 12-3 | (Japan) Masahiro Oishi | KO (punches) | ZST Grand Prix 2 - Final Round, Final | January 23, 2005 | 1 | 3:13 | Tokyo, Japan | Wins ZST Grand Prix - Final Round. |
| Win | 11-3 | (Japan) Hirotaka Miyakawa | KO (knee) | ZST Grand Prix 2 - Final Round, Semi Finals | January 23, 2005 | 1 | 0:48 | Tokyo, Japan | |
| Win | 10-3 | (Netherlands) Jakob Shaap | Submission (triangle choke) | Shooto Lithuania - Bushido | November 20, 2004 | 1 | | Vilnius, Lithuania | |
| Win | 9-3 | (Morocco) Boulem Belaini | KO (knee & punches) | ZST Grand Prix 2 - Opening Round | November 3, 2004 | 1 | 0:05 | Tokyo, Japan | Qualifies for ZST Grand Prix 2 - Final Round. |
| Loss | 8-3 | (Japan) Naoyuki Kotani | Submission (armbar) | ZST - Battle Hazard 1 | July 4, 2004 | 1 | 2:07 | Tokyo, Japan | |
| Loss | 8-2 | (Japan) Hideo Tokoro | Submission (triangle choke) | ZST 5 - The Battle Field 5 | May 5, 2004 | 1 | 3:30 | Tokyo, Japan | |
| Win | 8-1 | (Lithuania) Artemij Sitenkov | Submission (guillotine choke) | Shooto Lithuania - Vendetta | April 4, 2004 | 1 | 1:28 | Vilnius, Lithuania | |
| Win | 7-1 | (Japan) Takahiro Uchiyama | KO (punch) | ZST - GT-F | March 7, 2004 | 1 | 1:48 | Tokyo, Japan | |
| Loss | 6-1 | (Brazil) Marcus Aurélio | Submission (triangle choke) | ZST Grand Prix - Final Round, Semi Finals | January 11, 2004 | 1 | 2:48 | Tokyo, Japan | |
| Win | 6-0 | (Japan) Takumi Yano | KO (slam) | ZST Grand Prix - Final Round, Quarter Finals | January 11, 2004 | 1 | 4:36 | Tokyo, Japan | |
| Win | 5-0 | (Netherlands) Menno Dijkstra | KO (knee) | ZST Grand Prix - Opening Round | November 23, 2003 | 1 | 0:20 | Tokyo, Japan | Qualifies for ZST Grand Prix - Final Round. |
| Win | 4-0 | (Japan) Atsuhiro Tsuboi | KO (knee) | ZST 4 - The Battle Field 4 | September 7, 2003 | 1 | 0:41 | Tokyo, Japan | |
| Win | 3-0 | (Japan) Hideo Tokoro | KO (knees) | ZST 3 - The Battle Field 3 | June 1, 2003 | 1 | 2:54 | Tokyo, Japan | |
| Win | 2-0 | (Japan) Atsuhiro Tsuboi | KO (knee) | ZST 2 - The Battle Field 2 | March 9, 2003 | 2 | 1:37 | Tokyo, Japan | |
| Win | 1-0 | (Lithuania) Darius Balulis | Submission (rear-naked choke) | RF 2002 - Vol. 2 | April 28, 2002 | 2 | 1:37 | Lithuania | |

== Kickboxing record ==
Kickboxing Record
10 Wins (7 (T)KO's, 3 Decisions), 2 Losses, 1 Draw
| Date | Result | Opponent | Event | Location | Method | Round | Time | Record |
| 2014-11-15 | Win | (Spain) Juan Martos | HERO'S World GP 2014 Lithuania | Vilnius, Lithuania | TKO (Knees) | 2 | | 10-2-1 |
| 2011-11-19 | Win | (Poland) Eliasz Jankowski | HERO'S World GP 2011 Lithuania | Vilnius, Lithuania | KO (Spinning Heel kick & Flying Knee) | 1 | 0:29 | 9-2-1 |
| 2010-04-10 | Win | (Germany) Joel Knoch | K-1 World Grand Prix 2010 in Vilnius | Vilnius, Lithuania | TKO (Punches) | 1 | 0:39 | 8-2-1 |
| 2010-03-28 | Draw | (Poland) Michał Głogowski | K-1 World Grand Prix 2010 in Warsaw | Warsaw, Poland | Decision Draw | 3 | 3:00 | 7-2-1 |
| 2008-11-08 | Win | (Germany) Leo Boninger | MMA Bushido HERO'S 2008 | Vilnius, Lithuania | Decision (Unanimous) | 3 | 3:00 | 7-2 |
| 2008-07-07 | Loss | (Brazil) Andre Dida | K-1 World MAX 2008 World Championship Tournament Final 8 | Tokyo, Japan | TKO (3 Knockdowns) | 1 | 1:43 | 6-2 |
First fight after more than 2 years break due to back injury.
| 2006-04-05 | Loss | (Japan) Masato | K-1 World MAX 2006 World Tournament Open | Tokyo, Japan | TKO (Corner Stoppage) | 2 | 1:56 | 6-1 |
Fails to qualify for K-1 World MAX 2006 World Championship Final.
| 2006-03-10 | Win | (Germany) Denis Schneidmiller | K-1 East Europe MAX 2006 | Vilnius, Lithuania | Decision (Unanimous) | 3 | 2:00 | 6-0 |
| 2006-02-04 | Win | (Japan) Shingo Garyu | K-1 World MAX 2006 Japan Tournament | Saitama, Japan | KO (Flying Knee) | 1 | 0:08 | 5-0 |
| 2005-11-05 | Win | (South Korea) Su Hwan Lee | K-1 Fighting Network Korea MAX 2005 | Seoul, South Korea | KO (Left hook) | 2 | 2:50 | 4-0 |
| 2005-10-12 | Win | (Japan) Yasuhiro Kazuya | K-1 World MAX 2005 Champions Challenge | Tokyo, Japan | Decision (Unanimous) | 3 | 3:00 | 3-0 |
| 2003-05-10 | Win | (Lithuania) Aurelijus Guogis | MUAY THAI super fights - "SPROGIMAS" | N/A | TKO (Doctor stoppage) | 1 | N/A | 2-0 |
| 2002-12-14 | Win | (Russia) Dmitrij Vasiljev | 6th BUSHIDO-RINGS tournament "DINAMITAS" | N/A | KO (Knee) | 1 | N/A | 1-0 |
Legend: Win Loss Draw/No contest Notes

== See also ==
- List of male kickboxers
- List of male mixed martial artists
