= Lim Chi-bin =

Lim Chi-Bin
- Born: October 9, 1979 (age 47); Boryeong, Chungcheongnam-do, South Korea
- Native name: 임치빈
- Nationality: South Korean
- Height: 1.75 m (5 ft 9 in)
- Weight: 70 kg (154 lb; 11 st 0 lb)
- Division: Lightweight; Welterweight
- Style: Muay Thai
- Fighting out of: Seoul, South Korea
- Team: Khan Gym; Team Chi Bin

Kickboxing record
- Total: 37
- Wins: 23
- By knockout: 14
- Losses: 14
- By knockout: 9
- Last updated on: June 29, 2014

Lim Chi-Bin (born October 9, 1979), often anglicised to Chi-Bin Lim, is a South Korean welterweight kickboxer fighting out of Khan Gym / Team Chi Bin in Seoul. He is the three times Korea K-1 MAX champion currently competing in K-1 MAX.

== Biography ==
Chi Bin Lim made his K-1 debut at the K-1 World MAX 2005 Open in an elimination fight for a place at the K-1 World MAX Final against K-1 MAX legend Masato, whom he lost to by unanimous decision. The next year Lim entered and won the K-1 Fighting Network KHAN 2006 in Busan event, defeating Su Hwan Lee in the final by technical knockout and qualifying for the K-1 World MAX 2006 Open. As with the previous year Lim would be unable to progress to the final, losing to Takayuki Kohiruimaki via technical knockout.

Lim would return to tournament action at the K-1 Fighting Network KHAN 2007 in Seoul. Due to the previous years win he would be the event favourite. He managed to progress to the final but lost in a re-match of last years final by knockout to Su Hwan Lee. This meant that he was unable to participate in the K-1 World MAX Final Elimination. In 2008 Chi Bin Lim won the K-1 Asia MAX 2008 in Seoul Asia Tournament in devastating fashion, stopping all three of his opponents and earning himself a spot at the K-1 World MAX Final 16. As with his previous attempts he was unable to make the final, losing to Yasuhiro Kido by knockout.

2009 would again see Lim enter and win his regional qualifying event - beating local rival Su Hwan Lee in the final and qualifying for the K-1 World MAX Final 16. Once again Chi Bin Lim was unable to make the grade, losing a close decision to yet another Japanese fighter, Yuya Yamamoto. Due to an injury he found his opportunities limited in 2010 and was not given an opportunity to qualify for the K-1 World MAX final . He did have one highlight of that year, however, defeating Valdet Gashi in just 16 seconds at the 2010 W.A.K.O. PRO World Challenge.

He competed in the eight-man tournament at Glory 8: Tokyo - 2013 65kg Slam on May 3, 2013, losing to eventual champion Yuta Kubo via a second round body shot KO in the quarter-finals.

He lost to Mosab Amrani at Qabala Fight Series #1 in Qabala, Azerbaijan on June 29, 2014, suffering a knockdown with a knee to the body before being finished him a kick to the same spot shortly after.

He participated in the 2015 Glory Featherweight tournament. In the semifinals, he rematched Mosab Amrani. Amrani won the fight by a first round TKO.

He likewise took part in the 2016 Featherweight tournament. Lim lost by a second round TKO to Matt Embree in the semifinals.

== Titles ==
- 2009 K-1 Award & MAX Korea champion
- 2008 K-1 Asia MAX in Seoul Asia Tournament champion
- 2007 K-1 Fighting Network KHAN in Seoul runner up
- 2006 K-1 Fighting Network KHAN in Busan champion
- 2011 M-1 Welterweight champion
- 2011 W.A.K.O Pro Super Welterweight champion

== Kickboxing record ==
Kickboxing Record
23 Wins (14 (T)KO's, 9 Decisions), 14 Losses
Date	Result	Opponent	Event	Location	Method	Round	Time
2016-09-09	Loss	(Canada) Matt Embree	Glory 33: New Jersey - Featherweight Contender Tournament, Semi Finals	Trenton, New Jersey	TKO	2	3:00
2015-12-04	Loss	(Morocco) Mosab Amrani	Glory 26: Amsterdam - Featherweight Contender Tournament, Semi Finals	Amsterdam, Netherlands	TKO	1	1:32
2014-06-29	Loss	(Morocco) Mosab Amrani	Qabala Fight Series #1	Qabala, Azerbaijan	KO (left body kick)	1	1:28
2013-05-03	Loss	(Japan) Yuta Kubo	Glory 8: Tokyo - 65 kg Slam Tournament, Quarter Finals	Tokyo, Japan	KO (body shot)	2	
2011-09-06	Win	(Canada) Wesley Wein	2011 W.A.K.O World Championship in Chun Ju Chiu Cheon	Chun Ju, South Korea	KO	1	2:00
Wins W.A.K.O Pro Super Welterweight Title.
2011-07-18	Win	(Morocco) Mosab Amrani	REBELS 8 & It's Showtime	Tokyo, Japan	Ext.R Decision (Unanimous)	4	3:00
Fight will be for It's Showtime 65MAX top contender spot to face the current 65MAX champion Orono Wor Petchpun.
2011-04-24	Win	(Japan) Daiki Watabe	REBELS 7	Tokyo, Japan	Decision (Unanimous)	3	3:00
2010-10-03	Win	(Japan) Hideaki Kikkawa	K-1 World MAX 2010 Final 16 - Part 2, Super Fight	Seoul, South Korea	Decision (Unanimous)	3	3:00
2010-08-21	Win	(Germany) Valdet Gashi	2010 W.A.K.O. PRO World Challenge	Seoul, South Korea	KO	1	0:16
2009-09-26	Win	(Albania) Tahir Menxhiqi	K-1 World Grand Prix 2009 in Seoul Final 16	Seoul, South Korea	Decision (Unanimous)	3	3:00
2009-07-26	Win	(Japan) Tatsuji	Rise 57	Japan	Decision (Unanimous)	3	3:00
2009-04-21	Loss	(Japan) Yuya Yamamoto	K-1 World MAX 2009 World Championship Tournament Final 16	Fukuoka, Japan	Decision (Unanimous)	3	3:00
Fails to qualify for K-1 World MAX 2009 Final 8.
2009-03-20	Win	(South Korea) Su Hwan Lee	K-1 Award & MAX Korea 2009 Final	Seoul, South Korea	KO	3	1:50
Wins K-1 Award & MAX Korea 2009 and qualifies for K-1 World MAX 2009 Final 16.
2009-03-20	Win	(South Korea) Se Ki Kim	K-1 Award & MAX Korea 2009 Semi Final	Seoul, South Korea	KO	1	1:30
2009-03-20	Win	(South Korea) Min Sook Kwon	K-1 Award & MAX Korea 2009 Quarter Final	Seoul, South Korea	Decision (Unanimous)	3	3:00
2008-04-09	Loss	(Japan) Yasuhiro Kido	K-1 World MAX 2008 World Championship Tournament Final 16	Hiroshima, Japan	KO (Right Knee Strike)	1	0:40
Fails to qualify for K-1 World MAX 2008 Final 8.
2008-02-24	Win	(South Korea) K.MAX	K-1 Asia MAX 2008 in Seoul Asia Tournament Final	Seoul, South Korea	KO (Left Hook)	3	2:06
Wins K-1 Asia MAX 2008 in Seoul Asia Tournament and qualifies for K-1 World MAX 2008 Final 16.
2008-02-24	Win	(South Korea) Doo Suk Oh	K-1 Asia MAX 2008 in Seoul Asia Tournament Semi Final	Seoul, South Korea	TKO (Referee Stoppage)	2	0:33
2008-02-24	Win	(Japan) Satoru Suzuki	K-1 Asia MAX 2008 in Seoul Asia Tournament Quarter Final	Seoul, South Korea	TKO (Low Kick)	3	0:38
2007-07-21	Loss	(Ukraine) Artur Kyshenko	K-1 Fighting Network KHAN 2007	Seoul, South Korea	KO (Low Kicks)	2	1:04
2007-02-18	Loss	(South Korea) Su Hwan Lee	K-1 Fighting Network KHAN 2007 in Seoul Final	Seoul, South Korea	KO	1	1:50
Fails to qualify for K-1 World MAX 2007 Final Elimination.
2007-02-18	Win	(South Korea) Yeon Jong Kim	K-1 Fighting Network KHAN 2007 in Seoul Semi Final	Seoul, South Korea	KO	3	1:40
2007-02-18	Win	(Japan) Naoki Samukawa	K-1 Fighting Network KHAN 2007 in Seoul Quarter Final	Seoul, South Korea	Decision (Unanimous)	3	3:00
2006-09-16	Loss	(South Africa) Virgil Kalakoda	K-1 Fighting Network KHAN 2006 in Seoul	Seoul, South Korea	Ext.R Decision (Unanimous)	4	3:00
2006-05-05	Loss	(Japan) Takayuki Kohiruimaki	K-1 World MAX 2006 World Tournament Open	Tokyo, Japan	TKO	3	2:46
Fails to qualify for K-1 World MAX 2006 World Championship Final.
2006-02-25	Win	(South Korea) Su Hwan Lee	K-1 Fighting Network KHAN 2006 in Busan Final	Busan, South Korea	TKO	3	1:30
Wins K-1 Fighting Network KHAN 2006 in Busan and qualifies for K-1 World MAX 2006 World Tournament Open.
2006-02-25	Win	(South Korea) Sung Hwan Park	K-1 Fighting Network KHAN 2006 in Busan Semi Final	Busan, South Korea	Decision (Majority)	3	3:00
2006-02-25	Win	(South Korea) Jong Yoon Choi	K-1 Fighting Network KHAN 2006 in Busan Quarter Final	Busan, South Korea	Decision (Unanimous)	3	3:00
2005-11-05	Loss	(Netherlands) Albert Kraus	K-1 Fighting Network Korea MAX 2005	Seoul, South Korea	Decision (Unanimous)	3	3:00
2005-09-25	Loss	(Japan) Hiroki Shishido	WSBA "Shoot Boxing 20th Anniversary Series 4th"	Tokyo, Japan	Decision (Unanimous)	5	3:00
2005-06-26	Win	(Japan) Kenichi Ogata	WSBA "Shoot Boxing 20th Anniversary Series 3rd"	Tokyo, Japan	TKO (Doctor Stoppage, Cut)	2	3:00
2005-06-04	Win	(Spain) David Fernandez	KOMA(King Of Martial Arts) MS 'The Fame'	South Korea	KO	1	0:10
2005-05-04	Loss	(Japan) Masato	K-1 World MAX 2005 World Tournament Open	Tokyo, Japan	Decision (Unanimous)	3	3:00
Fails to qualify for K-1 World MAX 2005 Final.
2004-10-13	Loss	(Thailand) Namsaknoi Yudthagarngamtorn	XENIA X-Fighter	Seoul, Korea	KO	4	2:15
2003-01-04	Win	(Japan) Atsushi Otsuki	AJKF KICK ENERGY	Tokyo, Japan	KO (Corner Stoppage)	4	0:33
2003-03-08	Win	(Japan) Satoshi Kobayashi	AJKF Lightweight Tournament	Tokyo, Japan	KO	2	1:53
2002-12-01	Win	(Japan) Yuya Yamamoto	龍PROMOTION I.K.M.F. Korea - Japan 4VS4 Match	South Korea	Decision	5	3:00
2002-10-17	Win	(Japan) Takahito Fujimasa	AJKF Brandnew Fight	Tokyo, Japan	KO	2	0:25
Legend: Win Loss Draw/No contest Notes

== See also ==
- List of male kickboxers
- List of K-1 events
