= Tun Lwin Moe =

Burmese Lethwei fighter

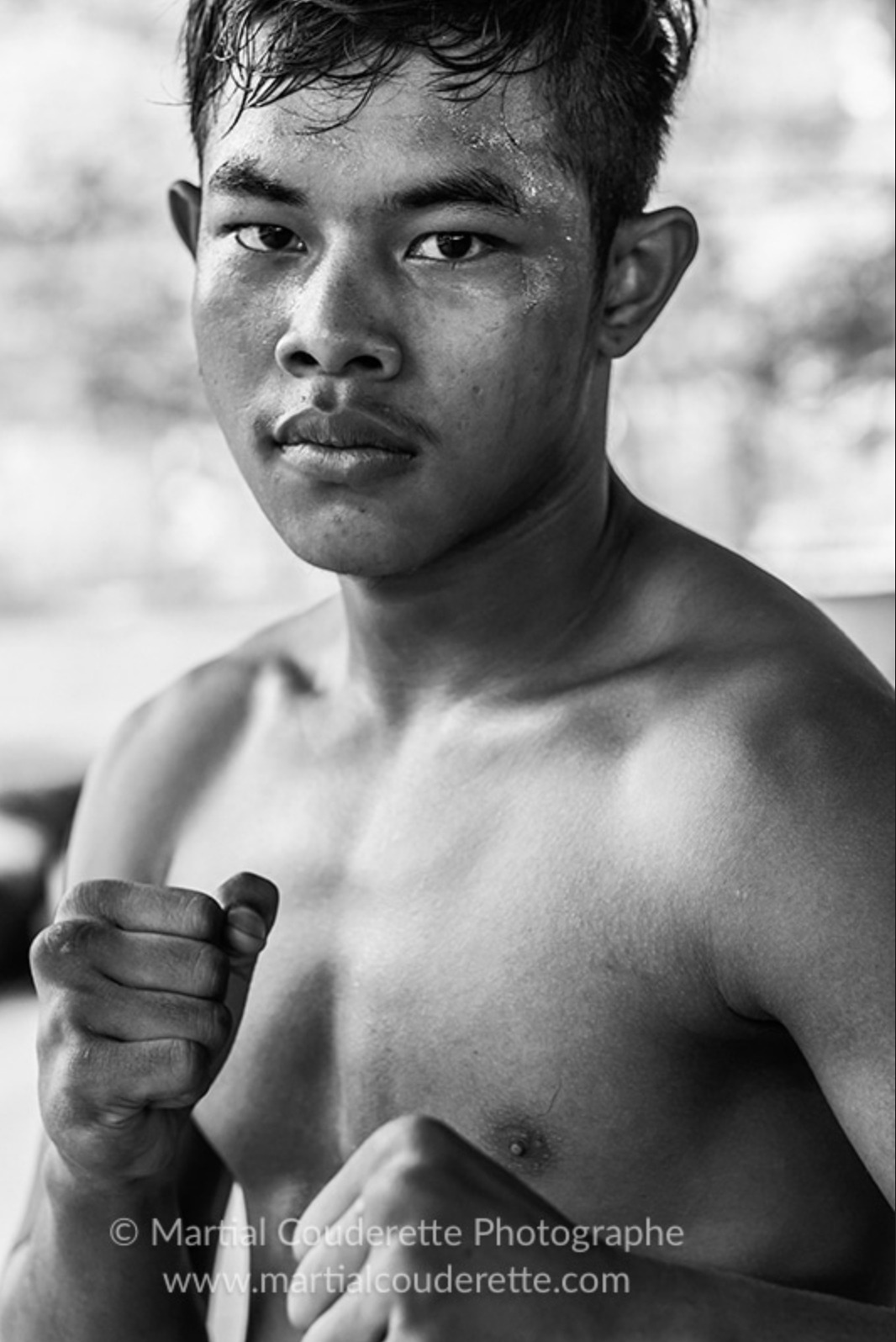
- Tun Lwin Moe in 2017
- Born: March 8, 1999 (age 27); Daw Nyein village, Pyapon Township, Ayeyarwady Region, Myanmar
- Native name: ထွန်းလွင်မိုး
- Nationality: Burmese
- Height: 1.65 m (5 ft 5 in)
- Weight: 64 kg (141 lb; 10 st 1 lb)
- Stance: Orthodox
- Fighting out of: Myanmar
- Team: Nagamahn Lethwei Club, Yangon; Tawwinirra Lethwei Club, Bogale
- Trainer: Kyaw Soe
- Years active: 2015–2021

Other information
- Spouse: Ma Min Pa Pa Aung (m. 2019)
- Children: 1

Tun Lwin Moe (Burmese: ထွန်းလွင်မိုး; born 8 March 1999) is a retired undefeated Burmese Lethwei fighter. He was signed to the International Lethwei Federation Japan and was the 60 kg (130 lb) Lethwei World Champion under traditional rules.

== Lethwei career ==
Tun Lwin Moe has been trained by Kyaw Soe, the head coach at Nagamahn and father of Lethwei Champion Too Too. (Burmese: နဂါးမာန်) and was formerly employed at the now-defunct Lethwei camp Kyaw Lin Naing. He is one of the few boxers who started their careers in Lethwei without having competed before for Region-, State- or government-funded Golden Belt Championship titles. Starting with a few under-card fights in Yangon in 2015, he already competed in the following year against top talents.

=== Eye problem ===
In November 2018, it was announced that Tun Lwin Moe had been removed from the Lethwei in Japan 10: Nori event by ILFJ officials. The reason was an abnormality in his left eye that was discovered during a medical examination on October 28. Tun Lwin Moe had a fight in Thailand on the day and the discovery sparked a minor debate on fighter safety and whether the officials in Myanmar had been negligent over his and other individual's well-being. Tun Lwin Moe had eye surgery on November 14.

In October 2019, Tun Lwin Moe and his father said in an interview that Tun Lwin Moe's vision had not yet fully returned and that the recovery could take up to 2 years. In the meantime, they would focus on the career of his younger brother Thant Zin instead.

In January 2020, Tun Lwin Moe announced an upcoming fight with Yokpetch Petchkasem on short notice which got cancelled. He took a replacement fight in facing Saw Min Naing in February. He has since retired from competition due to lasting eye damage.

== Outside the ring ==
In 2022, Tun Lwin Moe opened a Lethwei gym called Tawwinirra in the Irrawaddy Division, Bogale where he trains aspiring Lethwei fighters.

== Titles ==
- 60 kg Myanmar Lethwei World Championship Belt: 2016
- 60 kg Myanmar Lethwei World Championship Belt: 2017

== Professional Lethwei record ==
Professional Lethwei record
19 wins, 0 losses, 16 draws
Date	Result	Opponent	Event	Location	Method	Round
2020-02-19	Draw	(Myanmar) Saw Min Naing	Andin village Challenge Fights	Ye Township, Myanmar	Draw	5
2018-10-28	Draw	(Thailand) Jaising CMA Gym	Diamond Super Fight	Mahachai, Thailand	Draw	5
2018-09-13	Win	(Japan) Sojun Ikkyu	Lethwei in Japan 9: Kodo	Tokyo, Japan	TKO	3
2018-08-19	Draw	(Thailand) Keerati Sririttidet (Meeboon)	2018 Myanmar Lethwei World Championship	Yangon, Myanmar	Draw	5
2018-06-29	Win	(South Korea) Hwang Chang-hwan	Lethwei in Japan 8: Samurai	Tokyo, Japan	TKO	3
2018-03-31	Win	(Myanmar) Saw Hla Kyi Htoo	Kya-In Seikkyi Challenge Fights	Kyainseikgyi Township, Myanmar	TKO	3
2018-03-25	Win	(Thailand) Daj Jitmuangnon	Lethwei in Thailand	Mahachai, Thailand	KO	2
2018-02-28	Win	(Thailand) Petchsit	Magha Puja Challenge Fights	Lamaing Township, Myanmar	KO	1
2018-02-21	Draw	(Japan) Shunichi Shimizu	Lethwei in Japan 7: Yuki	Tokyo, Japan	Draw	5
2018-02-10	Win	(Myanmar) Kyar Ba Hein	Andin village Challenge Fights	Ye Township, Myanmar	KO	1
2017-11-15	Draw	(Japan) Higashi Shuhei	Lethwei Grand Prix Japan 2017	Tokyo, Japan	Draw	5
2017-10-08	Draw	(Myanmar) Saw Min Min	Great Tiger Group: Clash of Lethwei Tiger 5	Mandalay, Myanmar	Draw	5
2017-08-20	Win	(New Zealand) Alexi Serepisos	2017 Myanmar Lethwei World Championship	Yangon, Myanmar	TKO (Cut)	2
Wins 60kg Myanmar Lethwei World Championship belt
2017-03-26	Draw	(Myanmar) Ye Thway Ni	Great Tiger Group: Clash of Lethwei Tiger 4	Yangon, Myanmar	Draw	5
2017-03-12	Win	(Thailand) Petchmai SV Terbolek	Lamaing Challenge Fights	Lamaing, Ye, Myanmar	KO	5
2017-03-02	Draw	(Myanmar) Ye Thway Ni	Lethwei Challenge Fights	Mandalay, Myanmar	Draw	5
2017-01-06	Win	(Laos) Hnung Lan Lex	International Lethwei Challenge Fights	Mandalay, Myanmar	KO	2
2016-11-27	Draw	(Myanmar) Mite Yine	Mandalay Rumbling Challenge Fight	Yangon, Myanmar	Draw	5
2016-10-27	Draw	(Myanmar) Saw Htoo Aung	Lethwei in Japan GP 2016	Tokyo, Japan	Draw	5
2016-10-09	Win	(Myanmar) Nat Khat Aung	Great Tiger Group: Challenge Fights 2016	Yangon, Myanmar	KO	1
2016-08-21	Win	(Japan) Ouka	2016 Myanmar Lethwei World Championship	Yangon, Myanmar	TKO	2
Wins 60kg Myanmar Lethwei World Championship belt
2016-06-19	Win	(Myanmar) Joker	Myanmar Fight XIV	Yangon, Myanmar	KO	2
2016-06-05	Win	(Myanmar) Saw Yar Zar	Great Tiger Group: Clash of Lethwei Tigers 2016	Yangon, Myanmar	KO	2
2016-05-20	Draw	(Myanmar) Kyar Ba Hein	Lethwei Challenge Fights	Mandalay, Myanmar	Draw	5
2016-04-02	Win	(Myanmar) Htal Gyi	Max Thingyan Fight	Yangon, Myanmar	KO	2
2016-03-04	Draw	(Myanmar) Ye Thway Ni	Great Tiger Group: Clash of Lethwei Tiger	Mandalay, Myanmar	Draw	5
2016-02-14	Win	(Myanmar) Saw Darwait	Heroes vs. Samurais; Myanmar-Japan Challenge Fights	Yangon, Myanmar	TKO	3
2016-01-17	Win	(Myanmar) Kyaw Win Aung	Challenge to Myanmar Champion	Yangon, Myanmar	KO	1
2015-11-26	Draw	(Myanmar) Sin Yine Lay	Bagan Fight at Shwezigon Pagoda	Bagan, Myanmar	Draw	5
2015-11-06	Draw	(Myanmar) Htal Gyi	Taikkyi (Myaungmya) Challenge Fights	Ayeyarwady, Myanmar	Draw	5
2015-11-01	Win	(Myanmar) Zaw Chit Aung	New Generation Challenge Fights	Yangon, Myanmar	KO	2
2015-09-27	Draw	(Myanmar) Saw Thurein	Mandalay Rumbling Mega Fights	Yangon, Myanmar	Draw	5
2015-07-26	Win	(Myanmar) Phi Phyo Aung	Monsoon Fight	Yangon, Myanmar	KO	3
2015-06-21	Win	(Myanmar) Soe Moe Aung	Myanmar Fight	Yangon, Myanmar	KO	2
2015-03-03	Draw	(Myanmar)	Mon-Myanmar-Thai Challenge Fights, Kyaik Kelasa Pagoda stadium	Lamaing, Ye, Mon State, Myanmar	Draw	3
Legend: Win Loss Draw Notes
