= UFC 164 =

UFC mixed martial arts event in 2013

UFC 164: Henderson vs. Pettis 2
- The poster for UFC 164: Henderson vs. Pettis 2
- Promotion: Ultimate Fighting Championship
- Date: August 31, 2013
- Venue: BMO Harris Bradley Center
- City: Milwaukee, Wisconsin
- Attendance: 9,178
- Total gate: $907,116
- Buyrate: 270,000

Event chronology
UFC Fight Night: Condit vs. Kampmann 2	UFC 164: Henderson vs. Pettis 2	UFC Fight Night: Teixeira vs. Bader

UFC 164: Henderson vs. Pettis 2 was a mixed martial arts event held on August 31, 2013, at the BMO Harris Bradley Center in Milwaukee, Wisconsin.

== Background ==
The main event was expected to be a UFC Lightweight Championship bout between the current champion Benson Henderson and top contender T. J. Grant. However, Grant was forced out of the bout with an injury and was replaced by Anthony Pettis. Henderson and Pettis met in 2010 at the final event for World Extreme Cagefighting, WEC 53. Pettis defeated Henderson via unanimous decision to win the final WEC Lightweight title in a bout that was widely praised by MMA fans and pundits alike as the fight of the year.

Co-featured was a bout between two former UFC Heavyweight Champions, Frank Mir and Josh Barnett.

Ryan Couture was expected to face Quinn Mulhern at this event. However, Mulhern was forced out with a hand injury and was replaced by Al Iaquinta.

Yoel Romero was expected to face Derek Brunson at this event. However, Brunson was forced out with an injury and was replaced by newcomer Brian Houston. Houston ended up also getting injured and Romero was removed from the card.

== Results ==
Main card
Weight class				Method	Round	Time	Notes
Lightweight	Anthony Pettis	def.	Benson Henderson (c)	Submission (armbar)	1	4:31	(Note: For the UFC Lightweight Championship.)
Heavyweight	Josh Barnett	def.	Frank Mir	TKO (knee)	1	1:56
Featherweight	Chad Mendes	def.	Clay Guida	TKO (punches)	3	0:30
Heavyweight	Ben Rothwell	def.	Brandon Vera	TKO (punches and knees)	3	1:54
Featherweight	Dustin Poirier	def.	Erik Koch	Decision (unanimous) (29–28, 29–27, 29–27)	3	5:00
Preliminary card (Fox Sports 1)
Lightweight	Gleison Tibau	def.	Jamie Varner	Decision (split) (29–28, 27–29, 29–28)	3	5:00
Flyweight	Tim Elliott	def.	Louis Gaudinot	Decision (unanimous) (30–27, 30–26, 30–26)	3	5:00
Welterweight	Lim Hyun-gyu	def.	Pascal Krauss	TKO (knee and punches)	1	3:58
Bantamweight	Chico Camus	def.	Kang Kyung-ho	Decision (unanimous) (29–28, 29–28, 30–27)	3	5:00
Preliminary card (Facebook/YouTube)
Heavyweight	Soa Palelei	def.	Nikita Krylov	TKO (punches)	3	1:34
Lightweight	Al Iaquinta	def.	Ryan Couture	Decision (unanimous) (30–27, 30–27, 30–27)	3	5:00
Middleweight	Magnus Cedenblad	def.	Jared Hamman	Submission (guillotine choke)	1	0:57

== Bonus awards ==
The following fighters received $50,000 bonuses.

- Fight of The Night: Pascal Krauss vs. Hyun Gyu Lim
- Knockout of The Night: Chad Mendes
- Submission of the Night: Anthony Pettis

== Reported payout ==
The following is the reported payout to the fighters as reported to the Wisconsin's Department of Safety and Professional Services. It does not include sponsor money or "locker room" bonuses often given by the UFC and also do not include the UFC's traditional "fight night" bonuses.

- Anthony Pettis: $54,000 ($27,000 win bonus) def. Benson Henderson: $110,000
- Josh Barnett: $160,000 (no win bonus) def. Frank Mir: $200,000
- Chad Mendes: $62,000 ($31,000 win bonus) def. Clay Guida: $44,000
- Ben Rothwell: $108,000 ($54,000 win bonus) def. Brandon Vera: $70,000
- Dustin Poirier: $40,000 ($20,000 win bonus) def. Erik Koch: $15,000
- Gleison Tibau: $74,000 ($37,000 win bonus) def. Jamie Varner: $17,000
- Tim Elliott: $16,000 ($8,000 win bonus) def. Louis Gaudinot: $8,000
- Hyun Gyu Lim: $20,000 ($10,000 win bonus) def. Pascal Krauss: $15,000
- Chico Camus: $16,000 ($8,000 win bonus) def. Kyung Ho Kang: $8,000
- Soa Palelei: $20,000 ($10,000 win bonus) def. Nikita Krylov: $8,000
- Al Iaquinta: $20,000 ($10,000 win bonus) def. Ryan Couture: $15,000
- Magnus Cedenblad: $12,000 ($6,000 win bonus) def. Jared Hamman: $14,000

== See also ==
- List of UFC events
- 2013 in UFC
