= Lee Su-hwan (kickboxer) =

South Korean kickboxer (born 1983)

- Born: January 26, 1983 (age 43)
- Nationality: (South Korea) South Korean
- Height: 1.80 m (5 ft 11 in)
- Weight: 69.5 kg (153 lb; 10.94 st)
- Division: Welterweight; Middleweight
- Style: Kickboxing, Shoot boxing
- Fighting out of: Seoul, South Korea
- Team: Khan Gym / Inchoen Moobi Gym

Kickboxing record
- Total: 27
- Wins: 16
- By knockout: 9
- Losses: 11
- By knockout: 6
- Last updated on: May 27, 2012

Lee Su-hwan (Korean: 이수환; born January 26, 1983), often anglicised to Su-hwan Lee, is a South Korean middleweight kickboxer currently fighting out of Khan Gym in Seoul. He is the K-1 Fighting Network KHAN 2007 in Seoul champion currently fighting in K-1 MAX and Shoot boxing.

== Biography and career ==
Su Hwan Lee made his K-1 MAX debut against Remigijus Morkevičius in 2005 at K-1 Fighting Network Korea MAX 2005. Su Hwan Lee came into this fight holding a number of local honours such as being the reigning MBC ESPN Young-Ji Medicine Cup champion but found Morkevičius a higher level of opponent than what he was used to - losing by knockout in the second round. Lee would return to action the following year at the K-1 Fighting Network KHAN 2006 in Busan where he would reach the final, losing to Chi Bin Lim by technical knockout and missing out at a place at the K-1 World MAX 2006 World Tournament Open. He would finish the year strongly, winning two Super Fights and go 4 and 1 for 2006.

2007 would be a successful year for Lee. He won the K-1 Fighting Network KHAN 2007 in Seoul tournament gaining revenge on Chi Bin Lim and qualified for the K-1 World MAX 2007 Final Elimination. Lee faced Artur Kyshenko at this event but lost by knockout. His performance, however, earned him a Super Fight place at the K-1 World MAX 2007 World Final. Lee would win this fight and finish 2007 with a 3 and 1 record. Su Hwan Lee had a disappointing 2008 - he could only make the semi-finals at the K-1 Asia MAX 2008 in Seoul Asia Tournament losing to K. MAX by majority decision. He had one other fight that year - a win - and finished with a 2 and 1 record.

In 2009 Lee managed to reach the final of the K-1 Award & MAX Korea 2009 event, losing to nemesis Chi Bin Lim by knockout. Despite his loss, Lee would be invited to the K-1 World MAX 2009 Final 16 as a reservist. He would lose this fight and taking into consideration Super Fight results (a loss against Albert Kraus and an excellent win against Xan Yu) would finish 2009 with a 3 and 3 record. In 2010 Lee won two fights against Japanese opposition prior to being invited to the K-1 World MAX 2010 Final 16 - Part 2 for a chance of qualifying for that year's final. He was unable to proceed after being knocked out in devastating fashion by popular K-1 MAX veteran Gago Drago.

On December 17, 2012, Lee faced Danilo Zanolini for the HEAT Middleweight (-70 kg) Championship but was knocked out in the second round.

== Titles ==
- 2009 K-1 Award & Max Korea runner up
- 2007 K-1 Fighting Network KHAN in Seoul champion
- 2006 K-1 Fighting Network KHAN in Busan runner up
- 2005 MBC ESPN Young-Ji Medicine Cup 70 kg champion
- 2003 Korea Middleweight champion
- 2002 Korea Grand Prix 65 kg champion
- 2001 Korea Junior Welterweight champion

== Kickboxing record ==
Kickboxing Record
16 Wins (9 (T)KO's, 6 decisions), 11 Losses
Date	Result	Opponent	Event	Location	Method	Round	Time	Record
2012-05-27	Loss	(Ukraine) Artur Kyshenko	K-1 World MAX 2012 World Championship Tournament Final 16	Madrid, Spain	KO (Left hook)	2	2:05	16-11
2012-01-15	Loss	(South Korea) Woo Yong Choi	The Khan 3	Seoul, South Korea	Decision	3	3:00	16-10
2011-12-17	Loss	(Brazil) Danilo Zanolini	HEAT 20	Tokyo, Japan	KO	2	2:37	16-9
For the HEAT Middleweight (-70kg) Championship.
2011-01-15	Win	(China) Yang Zhuo	Wu Lin Feng	Henan, China	Decision	3	3:00	16-8
2010-10-03	Loss	(Armenia) Gago Drago	K-1 World MAX 2010 Final 16 - Part 2	Seoul, South Korea	KO (Right High Kick)	2	2:52	15-8
Fails to qualify for K-1 World MAX 2010 Final.
2010-05-16	Win	(Japan) Yukihiro Komiya	RISE 65	Tokyo, Japan	Ext.R Decision (Unanimous)	4	3:00	15-7
2010-04-11	Win	(Japan) Kenji Kanai	Shoot Boxing 25th Anniversary - Ishin 2nd Battle	Tokyo, Japan	TKO	1	0:38	14-7
2009-11-27	Win	(China) Xu Yan	The Khan 2	Seoul, South Korea	TKO (Left Straight)	2	2:10	13-7
2009-04-21	Loss	(Japan) Yasuhiro Kido	K-1 World MAX 2009 Final 16, Reserve Fight	Fukuoka, Japan	Decision (Unanimous)	3	3:00	12-7
2009-03-20	Loss	(South Korea) Chi Bin Lim	K-1 Award & MAX Korea 2009 Final	Seoul, South Korea	KO	3	1:50	12-6
Fails to qualify for K-1 World MAX 2009 Final 16. He will later be invited to take part in a Reserve Fight at the event.
2009-03-20	Win	(South Korea) Jae Gil No	K-1 Award & MAX Korea 2009 Semi-finals	Seoul, South Korea	KO	1	1:30	12-5
2009-03-20	Win	(Mongolia) Munguntsooj Nandin-Erdene	K-1 Award & MAX Korea 2009 Quarter-finals	Seoul, South Korea	KO	1	1:25	11-5
2009-02-23	Loss	(Netherlands) Albert Kraus	K-1 World MAX 2009 Japan Tournament	Tokyo, Japan	Decision (Unanimous)	3	3:00	10-5
2008-11-08	Win	(Japan) Keiji Ozaki	AJKF "Krush! -Kickboxing Destruction-"	Tokyo, Japan	Ext.R Decision (Split)	4	3:00	10-4
2008-02-24	Loss	(South Korea) K. MAX	K-1 Asia MAX 2008 in Seoul Asia Tournament Semi-finals	Seoul, South Korea	Decision (Majority)	3	3:00	9-4
2008-02-24	Win	(Thailand) Sirimongkol Singwangcha	K-1 Asia MAX 2008 in Seoul Asia Tournament Quarter-finals	Seoul, South Korea	Ext.R Decision (Split)	4	3:00	9-3
2007-10-03	Win	(Japan) Kazuya Yasuhiro	K-1 World MAX 2007 World Championship Final	Tokyo, Japan	Decision (Unanimous)	3	3:00	8-3
2007-06-28	Loss	(Ukraine) Artur Kyshenko	K-1 World MAX 2007 World Tournament Final Elimination	Tokyo, Japan	KO (Left Hook)	3	1:26	7-3
Fails to qualify for K-1 World MAX 2007 World Final. He will later be invited to take part in a Super Fight at the tournament.
2007-02-18	Win	(South Korea) Chi Bin Lim	K-1 Fighting Network KHAN 2007 in Seoul Final	Seoul, South Korea	KO	1	1:50	7-2
Wins K-1 Fighting Network KHAN 2007 in Seoul and qualifies for K-1 World MAX 2007 Final Elimination.
2007-02-18	Win	(South Korea) Jin Hwan Lee	K-1 Fighting Network KHAN 2007 in Seoul Semi-final	Seoul, South Korea	Decision (Majority)	3	3:00	6-2
2007-02-18	Win	(South Korea) Sung Hoon Kim	K-1 Fighting Network KHAN 2007 in Seoul Quarter-final	Seoul, South Korea	KO	1	0:30	5-2
2006-10-14	Win	(South Africa) Juante Steyn	K-1 Rules Africa Bomba-Yaa 2006	Johannesburg, South Africa	Decision (Unanimous)	3	3:00	4-2
2006-09-16	Win	(Japan) Shingo Garyu	K-1 Fighting Network KHAN 2006 in Seoul	Seoul, South Korea	TKO	1	0:27	3-2
2006-02-25	Loss	(South Korea) Chi Bin Lim	K-1 Fighting Network KHAN 2006 in Busan Final	Busan, South Korea	TKO	3	1:30	2-2
Fails to qualify for K-1 World MAX 2006 World Tournament Open.
2006-02-25	Win	(South Korea) Jung Woong Moon	K-1 Fighting Network KHAN 2006 in Busan Semi-final	Busan, South Korea	TKO	1	1:53	2-1
2006-02-25	Win	(South Korea) Jae Sik Choi	K-1 Fighting Network KHAN 2006 in Busan Quarter-final	Busan, South Korea	KO	1	0:24	1-1
2005-11-05	Loss	(Lithuania) Remigijus Morkevičius	K-1 Fighting Network Korea MAX 2005	Seoul, South Korea	KO	2	2:50	0-1
Legend: Win Loss Draw/No contest Notes

== See also ==
- List of male kickboxers
- List of K-1 Events
