= 2018 in ILFJ =

Information
- First date: February 21, 2018
- Last date: September 13, 2018

Events
- Total events: 4

Fights
- Total fights: 18

The year 2018 is the third year in the history of the ILFJ, a Japanese Lethwei promotion and the year started with Lethwei in Japan 7: Yuki. The events are streamed online by FITE TV, AbemaTV in Japan and through television agreements with MNTV in Myanmar.

== List of events ==
#	Event	Date	Venue	Location	Attendance
1	Lethwei in Japan 7: Yuki	February 21, 2018	Korakuen Hall	Tokyo, Japan	
2	Lethwei in Japan 8: Samurai	June 29, 2018	Korakuen Hall	Tokyo, Japan	
3	Lethwei in Japan 9: Kodo	September 13, 2018	Korakuen Hall	Tokyo, Japan	
4	Lethwei in Japan 10: Inori	November 14, 2018	Korakuen Hall	Tokyo, Japan	

== Lethwei in Japan 7: Yuki ==
Lethwei in Japan 7: Yuki
- Promotion: ILFJ
- Date: February 21, 2018
- Venue: Korakuen Hall
- City: Tokyo, Japan

Event chronology
Lethwei Grand Prix in Japan 2017	Lethwei in Japan 7: Yuki	Lethwei in Japan 8: Samurai

Lethwei in Japan 7: Yuki was a Lethwei event held on February 21, 2018 at the Korakuen Hall in Tokyo, Japan.

=== Background ===
For the main event, Myanmar rising star Tun Lwin Moe faced UFC, ROAD FC, Pancrase MMA veteran Shunichi Shimizu. Professional wrestler YABU and ZERO 1 athlete Chris Vice competed in the first 100 kg bout of the promotion.

=== Results ===
Lethwei in Japan 7: Yuki
Weight Class				Method	Round	Time	Notes
Featherweight 63 kg	(Myanmar) Tun Lwin Moe	-	(Japan) Shunichi Shimizu	Draw	5		
Middleweight 73 kg	(Japan) Kohei Tokeshi	def.	(Myanmar) Min Htet Aung	TKO	2	2:47	
Lightweight 70 kg	(Myanmar) Soe Lin Oo	def.	(Japan) Hareruya	KO	2	0:32	
Openweight 100 kg	(Australia) Chris Vice	def.	(Japan) YABU	TKO	4	0:56	
Featherweight 63 kg	(South Korea) Hwang Chang-hwan	def.	(Japan) Taiki Fukuda	KO	4	1:01	
Lightweight 66 kg	(Myanmar) Kyal Sin Phyo	def.	(Japan) Renji Kagamitsu	TKO	4	2:19	

== Lethwei in Japan 8: Samurai ==
Lethwei in Japan 8: Samurai
- Promotion: ILFJ
- Date: June 29, 2018
- Venue: Korakuen Hall
- City: Tokyo, Japan

Event chronology
Lethwei in Japan 7: Yuki	Lethwei in Japan 8: Samurai	Lethwei in Japan 9: Kodo

Lethwei in Japan 8: Samurai was a Lethwei event held on June 29, 2018 at the Korakuen Hall in Tokyo, Japan.

=== Background ===
This event marked the ILFJ debut of Myanmar Lethwei Champion Daiki Kaneko and the second fight of heavyweight Chris Vice in the organization. Japanese fighter Tokeshi Kohei defeated Lethwei veteran Saw Gaw Mu Do.

=== Results ===
Lethwei in Japan 8: Samurai
Weight Class				Method	Round	Time	Notes
Middleweight 73 kg	(Japan) Tokeshi Kohei	def.	(Myanmar) Saw Gaw Mu Do	KO	4	2:24	
Middleweight 75 kg	(Myanmar) Aung Paing	def.	(Japan) Keisuke Okuda	KO	1	2:30	
Weltertweight 67 kg	(Japan) Daiki Kaneko	def.	(Myanmar) Kyal Zin Phy	TKO	2	1:50	
Featherweight 64 kg	(Myanmar) Tun Lwin Moe	def.	(South Korea) Hwang Chang-hwan	TKO	2		
Openweight 100 kg	(Australia) Chris Vice	def.	(Taiwan) Dong Xing Wu	TKO	1	2:07	
Featherweight 61 kg	(Japan) Ikkyu Soujun	def.	(Japan) Hannya Hashimoto	TKO	1		

== Lethwei in Japan 9: Kodo ==
Lethwei in Japan 9: Kodo
- Promotion: ILFJ
- Date: September 13, 2018
- Venue: Korakuen Hall
- City: Tokyo, Japan

Event chronology
Lethwei in Japan 8: Samurai	Lethwei in Japan 9: Kodo	Lethwei in Japan 10: Inori

Lethwei in Japan 9: Kodo was a Lethwei event held on September 13, 2018 at the Korakuen Hall in Tokyo, Japan.

=== Background ===
Former UFC fighter Will Chope made his Lethwei debut against Lethwei veteran Shan Ko. Saw Min Aung vs. Tokeshi Kohei is a rematch from last years Air KBZ Aung Lan Championship that ended in a draw. The event was broadcast live on Japan’s AbemaTV and in Myanmar's MNTV.

=== Results ===
Lethwei in Japan 9: Kodo
Weight Class				Method	Round	Time	Notes
Featherweight 61.5 kg	(Japan) Makoto	-	(Japan) Teleca∞	Draw	4		
Featherweight 61 kg	(Myanmar) Voronika	-	(Japan) Marina Kumagai	Draw	4		
Lightweight 72 kg	(Myanmar) Shan Ko	-	(United States) Will Chope	Draw	5		
Featherweight 64 kg	(Myanmar) Tun Lwin Moe	def.	(Japan) Sojun Ikkyu	TKO	3		
Featherweight 62 kg	(Myanmar) Tauk Shar	-	(Japan) Shunichi Shimizu	Draw	2		
Welterweight 73 kg	(Myanmar) Saw Min Aung	-	(Japan) Tokeshi Kohei	Draw	5		

== Lethwei in Japan 10: Inori ==
Lethwei in Japan 10: Inori
- Promotion: ILFJ
- Date: November 14, 2018
- Venue: Korakuen Hall
- City: Tokyo, Japan

Event chronology
Lethwei in Japan 9: Kodo	Lethwei in Japan 10: Inori	Lethwei in Japan 11: Millenium Force

Lethwei in Japan 10: Nori will be a Lethwei event held on November 14, 2018 at the Korakuen Hall in Tokyo, Japan.

=== Results ===
Lethwei in Japan 10: Inori
Weight Class				Method	Round	Time	Notes
Featherweight 61.5 kg	(Japan) Kohei Tokeshi	-	(Myanmar) Soe Htet Oo	Draw	4		
Featherweight 61 kg	(Myanmar) Shuhei Azuma	-	(Japan) Char Bar Haein	Draw	4		
Lightweight 72 kg	(Myanmar) Kane Conlan	-	(United States) Pak Cau Lin Nine	Draw	5		
Featherweight 64 kg	(Myanmar) Makoto aka BASTA	def.	(Japan) Shunichi Shimizu	TKO	3		
Featherweight 62 kg	(Myanmar) Yuto Nakajima	-	(Japan) Mt. Tenjo	Draw	2		
Welterweight 73 kg	(Taiwan) Wu Dong Xing	-	(Japan) YABU	Draw	5		

== See also ==
- 2018 in K-1
- 2018 in Kunlun Fight
- 2018 in World Lethwei Championship
