= UFC Fight Night: Saffiedine vs. Lim =

UFC mixed martial arts event in 2014

- The poster for UFC Fight Night: Saffiedine vs. Lim
- Promotion: Ultimate Fighting Championship
- Date: January 4, 2014
- Venue: Marina Bay Sands
- City: Marina Bay, Singapore
- Attendance: 5,216

Event chronology
| UFC 168: Weidman vs. Silva 2 | UFC Fight Night: Saffiedine vs. Lim | UFC Fight Night: Rockhold vs. Philippou |

UFC Fight Night: Saffiedine vs. Lim (also known as UFC Fight Night 34) was a mixed martial arts event held on January 4, 2014, at the Marina Bay Sands in Marina Bay, Singapore.

== Background ==
This event was the first event the UFC held in Singapore. It was the first Fight Night card that wasn't aired on television in the United States market. Instead, the UFC offered fans based in North America, Australia and New Zealand the option to watch it via a new subscription service dubbed "UFC Fight Pass".

The event was expected to be headlined by a welterweight bout between Jake Ellenberger and Tarec Saffiedine. However, in late November, Ellenberger pulled out of the bout citing an injury and was replaced by Lim Hyun-gyu. Lim's original opponent, Kiichi Kunimoto instead faced Luiz Dutra Jr.

Hacran Dias was expected to face Tatsuya Kawajiri at the event. However, Dias pulled out of the bout citing an injury. Kawajiri instead faced promotional newcomer Sean Soriano.

UFC newcomer Will Chope was originally scheduled to face fellow newcomer Bekbulat Magomedov on this card. However, Magomedov was removed from the card and was replaced by Max Holloway.

== Results ==
Main Card (UFC Fight Pass)
| Weight class | | | | Method | Round | Time | Notes |
|---|---|---|---|---|---|---|---|
| Welterweight | Tarec Saffiedine | def. | Lim Hyun-gyu | Decision (unanimous) (49–46, 48–47, 48–47) | 5 | 5:00 |
| Featherweight | Tatsuya Kawajiri | def. | Sean Soriano | Submission (rear-naked choke) | 2 | 0:50 |
| Welterweight | Kiichi Kunimoto | def. | Luiz Dutra Jr. | Disqualification (illegal elbows) | 1 | 2:57 |
| Bantamweight | Kang Kyung-ho | def. | Shunichi Shimizu | Submission (arm-triangle choke) | 3 | 3:53 | (Note: Kang had 2 points deducted in round 1 due to two 12-6 elbows.) |
Preliminary card (UFC Fight Pass)
| Featherweight | Max Holloway | def. | Will Chope | TKO (punches) | 2 | 2:27 | (Note: This bout aired on the broadcast following the Kawajiri vs Soriano bout.) |
| Lightweight | Katsunori Kikuno | def. | Quinn Mulhern | Decision (unanimous) (30–27, 30–27, 30–27) | 3 | 5:00 |
| Bantamweight | Royston Wee | def. | Dave Galera | Decision (unanimous) (30–26, 30–26, 30–26) | 3 | 5:00 | (Note: Galera had 1 point deducted in round 3 due to an illegal upkick.) |
| Lightweight | Mairbek Taisumov | def. | Tae Hyun Bang | Decision (unanimous) (30–27, 30–27, 30–27) | 3 | 5:00 |
| Bantamweight | Dustin Kimura | def. | Jon Delos Reyes | Submission (armbar) | 1 | 2:13 |
| Bantamweight | Russell Doane | def. | Leandro Issa | Technical Submission (triangle choke) | 2 | 4:59 |

== Bonus awards ==
The following fighters received $50,000 bonuses.

- Fight of The Night: Tarec Saffiedine vs. Hyun Gyu Lim
- Knockout of The Night: Max Holloway
- Submission of the Night: Russell Doane

== See also ==
- List of UFC events
- 2014 in UFC
