= Keisuke Fujiwara =

Japanese martial artist

- Born: September 17, 1982 (age 44); Fukaya, Saitama, Japan
- Native name: 藤原 敬典
- Other names: Fighting Sculptor; Strong Arm from ZST
- Nationality: Japanese
- Height: 1.66 m (5 ft 5 1/2 in)
- Weight: 60 kg (130 lb; 9.4 st)
- Division: Bantamweight(MMA); Bantamweight (ZST)
- Stance: Orthodox
- Fighting out of: Tokyo, Japan
- Team: Akimoto Dojo Jungle Junction
- Years active: 2006–present

Kickboxing record
- Total: 5
- Wins: 2
- By knockout: 1
- Losses: 2
- Draws: 1

Mixed martial arts record
- Total: 29
- Wins: 16
- By knockout: 7
- By submission: 4
- By decision: 5
- Losses: 8
- By knockout: 1
- By submission: 1
- By decision: 6
- Draws: 5

Other information
- Website: http://blog.livedoor.jp/zst_fujiwara/
- Mixed martial arts record from Sherdog
- Last updated on: April 16, 2011

Keisuke Fujiwara (Japanese: 藤原敬典 Fujiwara Keisuke,IPA: [ɸɯʑiwaɾa keꜜːsɯ̥ke]; born September 17, 1982) is a Japanese mixed martial artist with a background in kickboxing.

== Biography ==
=== Kickboxing ===
While studying at art school, Fujiware joined Oguni-Gym to learn kickboxing. He got a license as a professional kickboxer. In 2004, he moved to Akimoto Dojo Jungle Junction and started leaning MMA.

=== Debut in 3 rules ===
On November 23, 2006, Fujiwara made a debut in a grappling match of ZST. He fought against Masato Arai, but the bout was decided as a draw because of time over.

On August 26, 2007, he made a debut in a MMA match of ZST. He fought against Hitoshi Makino and won by submission with triangle choke.

On May 20, 2007, he knocked out Ichiro Sugita during the 1st round, and won the Genesis tournament at bantamweight in ZST.

On February 24, 2008, he made a debut in kickboxing match under shoot boxing rule against Tatsuya Umemiya. He won by TKO when he cut Umemiya's right eye during 1st round.

=== Winning first title ===
On May 24, 2009, he fought against Yukito for the vacant 1st bantamweight title of ZST. He won by TKO with punches and became the 1st champion.

On October 25, 2009, he was offered to fight against Tomoya Miyashita in DREAM, but lost by unanimous decision after 3rd round.

On February 20, 2010, he had a rematch against Shunichi Shimizu to defend his ZST title, and retained his title by decision after 5th round. After the bout, he announced that he wanted to challenge DREAM again.

On November 25, 2010, he fought against Mariusz Cieśliński, a Polish kickboxer, in Poland under K-1 rule, but lost by unanimous decision.

On February 6, 2011, he had a rematch against Toshihiro Shimizu to defend his ZST title, and retained his title by submission with triangle choke during 5th round.

On May 29, 2011, he challenged DREAM again to participate in the bantamweight tournament.

== Mixed martial arts record ==
Professional record breakdown
30 matches	16 wins	9 losses
By knockout	7	1
By submission	4	1
By decision	5	7
Draws	5	

Res.	Record	Opponent	Method	Event	Date	Round	Time	Location	Notes
Win	16–9–5	Kohei Kuraoka	TKO (punches)	Zst 43: 12th Anniversary	November 23, 2014	3	4:28	Tokyo, Japan	
Draw	15–9–5	Alan Yoshihiro Yamaniwa	Draw (time limit)	Zst: Zst in Yokosuka Vol.1	June 29, 2014	3	5:00	Yokosuka, Japan	
Loss	15–9–4	Naohiro Mizuno	Decision (Split)	Shooto - 2nd Round 2014	March 16, 2014	2	5:00	Tokyo, Japan	
Loss	15–8–4	Ulka Sasaki	Submission (rear-naked choke)	Shooto - 1st Round 2014	January 13, 2014	1	4:35	Tokyo, Japan	
Win	15–7–4	Takumi Murata	Decision (unanimous)	ZST.37	September 23, 2013	2	5:00	Tokyo, Japan	
Win	14–7–4	Hideto Okada	Decision (majority)	ZST.36	July 14, 2013	2	5:00	Tokyo, Japan	
Loss	13–7–4	Shunichi Shimizu	Decision (unanimous)	ZST.33 - 10th Anniversary	November 23, 2012	2	5:00	Tokyo, Japan	
Loss	13–6–4	Aslan Toktarbaev	Decision (unanimous)	Rings - Vol.2: Conquisito	September 23, 2012	2	5:00	Tokyo, Japan	
Win	13–5–4	Kenichi Ito	TKO (corner stoppage)	ZST - Battle Hazard 6	July 16, 2012	2	5:00	Tokyo, Japan	
Win	12–5–4	Tetsuya Fusano	Decision (unanimous)	ZST.31	March 17, 2012	5	5:00	Tokyo, Japan	
Loss	11–5–4	Melvin Blumer	Decision (unanimous)	ZST.30	November 23, 2011	2	5:00	Tokyo, Japan	
Loss	11–4–4	Kenji Osawa	Decision (unanimous)	Dream.17	July 16, 2011	2	5:00	Tokyo, Japan	
Loss	11–3–4	Masakazu Imanari	Decision (unanimous)	Dream: Fight for Japan!	May 29, 2011	2	5:00	Saitama, Saitama, Japan	Dream Japan GP Bantamweight Japanese tournament, Quarter-final
Win	11–2–4	Toshihiro Shimizu	Submission (triangle choke)	ZST.27	February 6, 2011	5	3:46	Shinjuku, Tokyo, Japan	Retains ZST Bantamweight title.(2)
Win	10–2–4	Naohiro Hasegawa	Submission (triangle choke)	ZST.25	September 26, 2010	2	2:06	Shinjuku, Tokyo, Japan	
Draw	9–2–4	Tatsumitsu Wada	Draw	ZST Battle Hazard 04	July 3, 2010	2	5:00	Shinjuku, Tokyo, Japan	
Win	9–2–3	Ichiro Sugita	KO (punch)	ZST.24	April 18, 2010	2	1:20	Kōtō, Tokyo, Japan	
Win	8–2–3	Shunichi Shimizu	Decision (unanimous)	ZST.23	February 20, 2010	5	5:00	Shinjuku, Tokyo, Japan	Retains ZST Bantamweight title.(1)
Loss	7–2–3	Tomoya Miyashita	Decision (unanimous)	Dream 12	October 25, 2009	3	5:00	Osaka, Osaka, Japan	
Draw	7–1–3	Wataru Inatsu	Draw	ZST.21	September 21, 2009	2	5:00	Shinjuku, Tokyo, Japan	
Win	7–1–2	Yuichiro Shirai	TKO (punches)	ZST.20	May 24, 2009	2	4:37	Kōtō, Tokyo, Japan	Wins vacant 1st ZST Bantamweight title.
Win	6–1–2	Ryosuke Tamura	KO (punch)	ZST.19	January 25, 2009	2	2:33	Shinjuku, Tokyo, Japan	
Win	5–1–2	Shunichi Shimizu	KO (punch)	ZST.18	November 23, 2008	2	0:56	Kōtō, Tokyo, Japan	
Win	4–1–2	Tokuaki Ninomiya	Submission (guillotine choke)	ZST.15	November 23, 2007	1	1:04	Kōtō, Tokyo, Japan	
Loss	3–1–2	Ranki Kawana	TKO (doctor stoppage)	ZST.14	October 7, 2007	1	2:59	Kōtō, Tokyo, Japan	
Win	3–0–2	Toshihiro Shimizu	Submission (triangle choke)	ZST SWAT! 13	August 26, 2007	2	1:22	Tokyo, Japan	
Draw	2–0–2	Ranki Kawana	Draw	ZST.13	June 10, 2007	2	5:00	Kōtō, Tokyo, Japan	
Win	2–0–1	Ichiro Sugita	KO (front kick)	ZST SWAT! 11, Tournament Final	May 20, 2007	1	0:29	Ōta, Tokyo, Japan	Wins ZST Genesis Tournament 2007 Bantamweight.
Win	1–0–1	Satoshi Shinhori	Decision (unanimous)	ZST SWAT! 10, Tournament Semi-final	April 1, 2007	2	5:00	Ota, Tokyo, Japan	
Draw	0–0–1	Hitoshi Makino	Draw	ZST SWAT! 09	February 4, 2007	2	5:00	Ōta, Tokyo, Japan	

=== Professional grappling ===
Professional grappling record
1 Fights, 0 Wins, 0 Losses, 1 Draw
Date	Result	Opponent	Event	Location	Method	Round	Time
2006-11-23	Draw	(Japan) Masato Arai	ZST.11	Kōtō, Tokyo, Japan	Time Over	1	5:00
Legend: Win Loss Draw/No contest Notes

=== Professional kickboxing ===
Professional kickboxing Record
5 Fights, 2 Wins (1 TKO), 2 Losses, 1 Draw
Date	Result	Opponent	Event	Location	Method	Round	Time
2010-11-25	Loss	(Poland) Mariusz Cieśliński	KOK World GP 2010 in Warsaw	Warsaw, Poland	Decision (Unanimous)	3	3:00
2008-09-12	Loss	(Japan) Koya Shimada	Shoot boxing 2008 Road to S-cup 5	Tokyo, Japan	Decision (Unanimous)	3	3:00
2008-06-28	Win	(Japan) Akihiro Okuwa	Shoot boxing Young Caesar Cup 2007	Tokyo, Japan	Decision (Unanimous)	3	2:00
2008-05-18	Draw	(Japan) Akihiro Okuwa	ZST.17	Tokyo, Japan	Time Over	2	3:00
2008-02-24	Win	(Japan) Tatsuya Uematsu	ZST.16	Tokyo, Japan	TKO (Cut)	1	1:58
Legend: Win Loss Draw/No contest Notes

== Titles ==
- ZST Genesis Tournament 2007 Bantamweight winner
- ZST Bantamweight champion

Sporting positions
Preceded by ZST was established in 2002.	1st ZST Bantamweight Champion; May 24, 2009 - Current	Succeeded by N/A
