= ZST =

MMA promoter based in Tokyo, Japan

Fighting Network ZST
- Type: Private
- Industry: Mixed martial arts promotion
- Founded: 2002; 24 years ago
- Founder: Kōki Hioki
- Headquarters: Yoyogi, Shibuya, Tokyo, Japan
- Key people: Jō Uehara
- Website: http://www.zst.jp/

Fighting Network ZST (pronounced Zest) is a Japan-based mixed martial arts promotion and sanctioning organization holding amateur and semi-professional MMA events. Founded in 2002 as an offshoot of Fighting Network RINGS, on its early yeats ZST provided a platform for former RINGS fighters and developed a distinctive ruleset influenced by its predecessor. The promotion became known for its unusual rules and, particularly in its early years, tag-team MMA matches. The promotion served as a pathway for Japanese fighters to organizations including K-1 HERO'S, DREAM, DEEP and RIZIN.

ZST has not held a recorded event since ZST 70 in April 2021; no formal announcement of the promotion's closure or hiatus has been reported.

== History ==
=== Before establishment ===
ZST was conceived in efforts to accommodate fighters of shoot-style puroresu MMA promotion RINGS that went defunct in February 2002. On September 22, 2002, Takeshi Caesar, the president of Shoot Boxing Association (SBA), and Koki Hioki, representative of ZST, had a conversation after a Shoot Boxing event, and they announced that SBA would support ZST. For this reason, ZST promoted some matches under shoot boxing rule early on.

=== First event ===
The first ZST event "The Battle Field ZST Opening Event" was arranged on November 23, 2002 in Tokyo, and it has since experienced a dramatic increase in popularity possibly in large part due to their highly different rule format. In this event, not only usual MMA matches but MMA tag match also was held among Takumi Yano, Masakazu Imanari and Remigijus Morkevicius, Mindaugas Stankos .

=== ZST GP ===
On November 23, 2003, "ZST GP Opening" was held in Tokyo.

On May 17, 2008, ZST announced a major partnership with DEEP. The partnership will allow the two organizations to co-promote shows, share fighters and eventually unify the organizations.

Following its partnership with Deep, ZST continued to hold regular events throughout the 2010s, including its numbered ZST series, the developmental SWAT! series and amateur PRE STAGE events. The promotion expanded its championship divisions and continued to develop fighters who went on to compete in larger Japanese organizations. ZST held its 10th anniversary event in 2012 and continued its regular event schedule into the late 2010s, eventually reaching ZST 70 in April 2021.

ZST's most recent event was ZST 70, held on April 18, 2021. The organization has not held an event since.

== Rules ==
=== ZST Rule ===
Bouts consist of three rounds with a rest period of one and a half minutes. The first and second rounds are five minutes in duration and the third round is three minutes in duration, but the third round is an extra round. Punches, elbow strikes, knees and kicks are allowed to the head and body when both fighters are standing. On the ground punches, elbow strikes, knees and kicks are only allowed to the body. Bouts are not judged. In the event that the bout goes the full-time, the bout is ruled a draw.

=== Grappling rule (GT-F Rule) ===
Bouts consist of two rounds with a rest period of one and two minutes. The first and second rounds are five minutes in duration. The positioning is not regarded for scoring as important factor and any motions including clinching and holding which impedes bouts are prohibited. GT-F came from "Grappling Tournament - Featherweight".

== Events ==
ZST holds various types of events depending on their theme.

- ZST
  The main events held regularly under ZST rule for the top contenders.
- ZST GP
  The tournament events under KOK rule. The events are divided to twice.
- Battle Hazard
  The events focusing the matches which are not under ZST rule.
- GT-F
  The tournament events of grappling.
- Genesis
  The opening matches of ZST and Battle Hazard for the fresh professional contenders.
- SWAT!
  The events focusing the fresh professional contenders who currently participate Genesis matches. It holds "Genesis tournament" every year, and it is an actual freshmen tournament.
- Pre Stage
  The events of grappling for the amateur contenders.

== Weight division ==
ZST sets 11 weight divisions.

Weight division	Weight limit	No.	Name of Champion	Nationality
Absoluteweight	No weight restrictions	-	Vacant	-
Super heavyweight	Unlimited	-	Vacant	-
Heavyweight	105 kg (231.5 lb)	-	Vacant	-
Cruiserweight	95 kg (209.4 lb)	-	Vacant	-
Light heavyweight	85 kg (187.4 lb)	-	Vacant	-
Middleweight	80 kg (176.4 lb)	-	Vacant	-
Welterweight	75 kg (165.3 lb)	-	Tetsuya Yamada	Japan
Lightweight	70 kg (154.3 lb)	3rd	Sho Kogane	Japan
Featherweight	65 kg (143.3 lb)	4th	Tetsuya Seki	Japan
Bantamweight	60 kg (132.3 lb)	1st	Keisuke Fujiwara	Japan
Flyweight	55 kg (121.3 lb)	4th	Tatsuki Saomoto	Japan
