= 2009 in DREAM =

Mixed martial arts events

Information
- First date: March 8, 2009
- Last date: December 31, 2009

Events
- Total events: 7

Fights
- Total fights: 67
- Title fights: 3

Chronology
| 2008 in DREAM | 2009 in DREAM | 2010 in DREAM |

The year 2009 was the 2nd year in the history of DREAM, a mixed martial arts promotion based in Japan. In 2009 DREAM held 7 events beginning with, Dream 7: Featherweight Grand Prix 2009 First Round.

== Title fights ==
Title fights in 2009
| Weight class | | | | Method | Round | Time | Event | Notes |
|---|---|---|---|---|---|---|---|---|
| Welterweight | Marius Zaromskis | def. | Jason High | KO (Head Kick) | 1 | 2:22 | Dream 10: Welterweight Grand Prix 2009 Final Round | (Note: For the Dream Welterweight Championship.) |
| Lightweight | Shinya Aoki | def. | Joachim Hansen (c) | Submission (Armbar) | 2 | 4:56 | Dream 11: Featherweight Grand Prix 2009 Final Round | (Note: For the Dream Lightweight Championship.) |
| Featherweight | Bibiano Fernandes | def. | Hiroyuki Takaya | Decision (Split) | 2 | 5:00 | Dream 11: Featherweight Grand Prix 2009 Final Round | (Note: For the Dream Featherweight Championship.) |

== Events list ==
| # | Event Title | Date | Arena | Location | Attendees | Broadcast |
|---|---|---|---|---|---|---|
| 14 | Fields Dynamite!! The Power of Courage 2009 | December 31, 2009 | Saitama Super Arena | Saitama, Saitama, Japan | 45,606 | Tokyo Broadcasting System; HDNet |
| 13 | Dream 12: Cage of Dreams | October 25, 2009 | Osaka-jo Hall | Osaka, Osaka, Japan | 10,112 | Tokyo Broadcasting System; HDNet |
| 12 | Dream 11: Featherweight Grand Prix 2009 Final Round | October 6, 2009 | Yokohama Arena | Yokohama, Kanagawa, Japan | 14,039 | Tokyo Broadcasting System; HDNet |
| 11 | Dream 10: Welterweight Grand Prix 2009 Final Round | July 20, 2009 | Saitama, Saitama, Japan | Saitama Super Arena | 11,970 | Tokyo Broadcasting System; HDNet |
| 10 | Dream 9: Featherweight Grand Prix 2009 Second Round | May 26, 2009 | Yokohama Arena | Yokohama, Kanagawa, Japan | 15,009 | Tokyo Broadcasting System; HDNet |
| 9 | Dream 8: Welterweight Grand Prix 2009 First Round | April 5, 2009 | Nippon Gaishi Hall | Nagoya, Aichi, Japan | 9,129 | Tokyo Broadcasting System; HDNet |
| 8 | Dream 7: Featherweight Grand Prix 2009 First Round | March 8, 2009 | Saitama Super Arena | Saitama, Saitama, Japan | 19,528 | Tokyo Broadcasting System; HDNet |

== Dream 7: Featherweight Grand Prix 2009 First Round ==
Dream 7: Featherweight Grand Prix 2009 First Round was an event held on March 8, 2009 at the Saitama Super Arena in Saitama, Saitama, Japan.

=== Results ===
Main Card
| Weight class | | | | Method | Round | Time | Notes |
|---|---|---|---|---|---|---|---|
| Lightweight | Tatsuya Kawajiri | def. | Ross Ebanez | Submission (Rear-Naked Choke) | 1 | 4:03 |
| Welterweight | Shinya Aoki | def. | David Gardner | Submission (Rear-Naked Choke) | 1 | 5:58 |
| Lightweight | Mitsuhiro Ishida | def. | Daisuke Nakamura | Decision (Unanimous) | 2 | 5:00 |
Featherweight Grandprix 1st round
| Featherweight | Masakazu Imanari | def. | Atsushi Yamamoto | Decision (Split) | 2 | 5:00 |
| Featherweight | Hiroyuki Takaya | def. | Jong Won Kim | TKO (Punches) | 2 | 0:40 |
| Featherweight | Yoshiro Maeda | def. | Micah Miller | Decision (Unanimous) | 2 | 5:00 |
| Featherweight | Abel Cullum | def. | Akiyo Nishiura | Decision (Unanimous) | 2 | 5:00 |
| Featherweight | Joe Warren | def. | Chase Beebe | TKO (Doctor Stoppage) | 1 | 10:00 |
| Featherweight | Bibiano Fernandes | def. | Takafumi Otsuka | Decision (Unanimous) | 2 | 5:00 |

== Dream 8: Welterweight Grand Prix 2009 First Round ==
Dream 8: Welterweight Grand Prix 2009 First Round was an event held on April 5, 2009 at Nippon Gaishi Hall in Nagoya, Aichi, Japan.

=== Results ===
Welterweight Grand Prix 1st Round
| Weight class | | | | Method | Round | Time | Notes |
|---|---|---|---|---|---|---|---|
| Welterweight | Hayato Sakurai | def. | Shinya Aoki | TKO (Knees and Punches) | 1 | 0:27 |
| Welterweight | Jason High | def. | Yuya Shirai | Submission (Rear-Naked Choke) | 1 | 0:59 |
| Welterweight | Marius Zaromskis | def. | Seichi Ikemoto | Decision (Unanimous) | 2 | 5:00 |
| Welterweight | Andre Galvao | def. | John Alessio | Submission (Armbar) | 1 | 7:34 |
Featherweight Grandprix 1st round
| Featherweight | Daiki Hata | def. | Hideo Tokoro | Decision (Unanimous) | 2 | 5:00 |
Preliminary card
| Heavyweight | Jeff Monson | def. | Sergei Kharitonov | Submission (North-South Choke) | 1 | 1:42 |
| Catchweight (89kg) | Riki Fukuda | def. | Murilo Rua | Decision (Unanimous) | 2 | 5:00 |
| Lightweight | Vítor Ribeiro | def. | Katsuhiko Nagata | TKO (Doctor Stoppage) | 1 | 7:58 |
| Middleweight | Andrews Nakahara | def. | Shungo Oyama | TKO (Punches) | 1 | 2:00 |
| Catchweight (88 kg) | Katsuyori Shibata | def. | Ikuhisa Minowa | Decision (Unanimous) | 2 | 5:00 |

== Dream 9: Featherweight Grand Prix 2009 Second Round ==
Dream 9: Featherweight Grand Prix 2009 Second Round was an event held on May 26, 2009 at Yokohama Arena in Yokohama, Kanagawa, Japan.

=== Results ===
Dream Middleweight title fight
| Weight class | | | | Method | Round | Time | Notes |
|---|---|---|---|---|---|---|---|
| | Ronaldo Souza | vs. | Jason Miller | NC (Cut from an Illegal Kick) | 1 | 2:33 |
Second Round Feather Weight Grand Prix
| | Hideo Tokoro | def. | Abel Cullum | Submission (Rear-Naked Choke) | 2 | 1:38 |
| | Hiroyuki Takaya | def. | Yoshiro Maeda | TKO (Punches) | 1 | 9:40 |
| | Bibiano Fernandes | def. | Masakazu Imanari | Decision (Unanimous) | 2 | 5:00 |
| | Joe Warren | def. | Norifumi Yamamoto | Decision (Split) | 2 | 5:00 |
Lightweight bout
| Lightweight | Tatsuya Kawajiri | def. | Gesias Cavalcante | Decision (Unanimous) | 2 | 5:00 |
First Round Super Hulk Grand Prix
| Super Heavyweight | Gegard Mousasi | def. | Mark Hunt | Submission (Straight Armbar) | 1 | 1:19 |
| Super Heavyweight | Rameau Thierry Sokoudjou | def. | Jan Nortje | TKO (Punches) | 1 | 2:29 |
| Super Heavyweight | Hong Man Choi | def. | Jose Canseco | Submission (Punches) | 1 | 1:17 |
| Super Heavyweight | Ikuhisa Minowa | def. | Bob Sapp | Submission (Achilles Lock) | 1 | 1:15 |

== Dream 10: Welterweight Grand Prix 2009 Final Round ==
Dream 10: Welterweight Grand Prix 2009 Final Round was an event held on July 20, 2009 at the Saitama Super Arena in Saitama, Saitama, Japan.

=== Results ===
Welterweight Grand Prix 2009 final
| Weight class | | | | Method | Round | Time | Notes |
|---|---|---|---|---|---|---|---|
| Welterweight | Marius Zaromskis | def. | Jason High | KO (Head Kick) | 1 | 2:22 | (Note: For the Dream Welterweight Championship.) |
Main Card
| Lightweight | Shinya Aoki | def. | Vítor Ribeiro | Decision (Unanimous) | 2 | 5:00 |
| Middleweight | Jesse Taylor | def. | Dong Sik Yoon | Submission (Foot Injury) | 1 | 1:02 |
| Middleweight | Paulo Filho | def. | Melvin Manhoef | Submission (Armbar) | 1 | 2:36 |
| Lightweight | Katsunori Kikuno | def. | Andre Amado | TKO (Punches) | 1 | 3:47 |
Welterweight Grand Prix 2009 semi-final
| Welterweight | Marius Zaromskis | def. | Hayato Sakurai | TKO (Head Kick and Punches) | 1 | 4:03 |
| Welterweight | Jason High | def. | Andre Galvao | Decision (Split) | 2 | 5:00 |
Welterweight Grand Prix reserve bout
| Welterweight | Tarec Saffiedine | def. | Seichi Ikemoto | Decision (Unanimous) | 2 | 5:00 |

== Dream 11: Featherweight Grand Prix 2009 Final Round ==
Dream 11: Featherweight Grand Prix 2009 Final Round was an event held on October 6, 2009 at Yokohama Arena in Yokohama, Kanagawa, Japan.

=== Results ===
Featherweight Grand Prix 2009 Final
| Weight class | | | | Method | Round | Time | Notes |
|---|---|---|---|---|---|---|---|
| Featherweight | Bibiano Fernandes | def. | Hiroyuki Takaya | Decision (Split) | 2 | 5:00 | (Note: For the Dream Featherweight Championship.) |
Dream Lightweight Championship bout
| Lightweight | Shinya Aoki | def. | Joachim Hansen (c) | Submission (Armbar) | 2 | 4:56 | (Note: For the Dream Lightweight Championship.) |
Super Fights
| Lightweight | Kazushi Sakuraba | def. | Rubin Williams | Submission (Kimura) | 1 | 2:53 |
| Middleweight | Tatsuya Kawajiri | def. | Melchor Manibusan | TKO (Punches) | 1 | 3:48 |
Super Hulk Grand Prix 2009 Semi-Finals
| Super Heavyweight | Rameau Thierry Sokoudjou | def. | Bob Sapp | TKO (Punches) | 1 | 1:31 |
| Super Heavyweight | Ikuhisa Minowa | def. | Hong Man Choi | Submission (Heel Hook) | 2 | 1:27 |
Featherweight Grand Prix 2009 Semi-Finals
| Featherweight | Bibiano Fernandes | def. | Joe Warren | Submission (Armbar) | 1 | 0:42 |
| Featherweight | Hiroyuki Takaya | def. | Hideo Tokoro | TKO (Punches) | 2 | 0:32 |
Featherweight Grand Prix 2009 Reserve bout
| Featherweight | Kazuyuki Miyata | def. | Daiki Hata | Decision (Unanimous) | 2 | 5:00 |

== Dream 12: Cage of Dreams ==
Dream 12: Cage of Dreams was an event held on October 25, 2009 at Osaka-jo Hall in Osaka, Osaka, Japan.

=== Results ===
Main card
| Weight class | | | | Method | Round | Time | Notes |
|---|---|---|---|---|---|---|---|
| Featherweight | Tomoya Miyashita | def. | Keisuke Fujiwara | Decision (unanimous) | 3 | 5:00 |
| Lightweight | Kuniyoshi Hironaka | def. | Won Sik Park | TKO (corner stoppage) | 1 | 5:00 |
| Featherweight | Yoshiro Maeda | def. | Chase Beebe | Submission (rear naked choke) | 1 | 3:26 |
| Middleweight | Dong Sik Yoon | def. | Tarec Saffiedine | Decision (split) | 3 | 5:00 |
| Middleweight | Kazushi Sakuraba | def. | Zelg Galesic | Submission (kneebar) | 1 | 1:40 |
| Welterweight | Marius Zaromskis | def. | Myeon Ho Bae | KO (head kick) | 1 | 0:19 |
| Lightweight | Eddie Alvarez | def. | Katsunori Kikuno | Submission (arm triangle choke) | 2 | 3:42 |
| Heavyweight | Alistair Overeem | def. | James Thompson | Submission (guillotine choke) | 1 | 0:33 |
| Middleweight | Katsuyori Shibata | def. | Tokimitsu Ishizawa | TKO (punches) | 1 | 4:52 |

== Dynamite!! The Power of Courage 2009 ==
Dynamite!! The Power of Courage 2009 was a mixed martial arts and kickboxing event promoted by Fighting and Entertainment Group, was an event held on December 31, 2009 at the Saitama Super Arena in Saitama, Japan. The event included bouts that encompass the DREAM, Sengoku Raiden Championship, K-1, and K-1 World MAX banners. The event aired on HDNet in North America.

=== Results ===
DREAM Super Hulk Grand Prix 2009 Final
| Weight class | | | | Method | Round | Time | Notes |
|---|---|---|---|---|---|---|---|
| Super Heavyweight | Ikuhisa Minowa | def. | Rameau Thierry Sokoudjou | TKO (Punches) | 3 | 3:29 |
Sengoku Raiden Championship Heavyweight bout
| Heavyweight | Hidehiko Yoshida | def. | Satoshi Ishii | Decision (Unanimous) | 3 | 5:00 |
DREAM Heavyweight bout
| Heavyweight | Gegard Mousasi | def. | Gary Goodridge | TKO (Punches) | 1 | 1:34 |
DREAM vs Sengoku Raiden Championship MMA bouts
| Heavyweight | Hiroshi Izumi | def. | Katsuyori Shibata | Decision (Unanimous) | 3 | 5:00 |
| Featherweight | Michihiro Omigawa | def. | Hiroyuki Takaya | TKO (Punches) | 1 | 2:54 |
| Welterweight | Akihiro Gono | def. | Hayato Sakurai | Submission (Armbar) | 2 | 3:56 |
| Middleweight | Melvin Manhoef | def. | Kazuo Misaki | TKO (Punches) | 1 | 1:49 |
| Featherweight | Hideo Tokoro | def. | Jong Man Kim | Decision (Unanimous) | 3 | 5:00 |
| Lightweight | Tatsuya Kawajiri | def. | Kazunori Yokota | Decision (Unanimous) | 3 | 5:00 |
| Featherweight | Masanori Kanehara | def. | Norifumi Yamamoto | Decision (Unanimous) | 3 | 5:00 |
| Heavyweight | Alistair Overeem | def. | Kazuyuki Fujita | KO (Knee) | 1 | 1:15 |
| Lightweight | Shinya Aoki | def. | Mizuto Hirota | Technical Submission (Hammerlock) | 1 | 1:17 |
K-1 card
| K-1 MAX | Masato | def. | Andy Souwer | unanimous decision | 5 | 3:00 |
| K-1 Heavyweight | Ray Sefo | def. | Yosuke Nishijima | unanimous decision (3-0) | 3 | 3:00 |
K-1 KOSHIEN 62 kg Class Tournament Final
| K-1 KOSHIEN 62 kg | Masaaki Noiri | def. | Shota Shimada | unanimous decision (3-0) | 3 | 2:00 |
K-1 KOSHIEN 62 kg Class Tournament Semi-Finals
| K-1 KOSHIEN 62 kg | Shota Shimada | def. | Katsuki Ishida | majority decision (2-0) | 3 | 2:00 |
| K-1 KOSHIEN 62 kg | Masaaki Noiri | def. | Hiroya | unanimous decision (3-0) | 3 | 2:00 |
K-1 KOSHIEN 62 kg Class Tournament Reserve Fight
| K-1 KOSHIEN 62 kg | Tsukasa Fuji | def. | Tatuya Kusakabe | majority decision (2-0) | 3 | 2:00 |
