= Dream 11 =

Mixed martial arts event in 2009

Dream 11: Feather Weight Grand Prix 2009 Final Round
- The poster for Dream 11: Feather Weight Grand Prix 2009 Final Round
- Promotion: Dream
- Date: October 6, 2009
- Venue: Yokohama Arena
- City: Yokohama, Japan
- Attendance: 14,039

Event chronology
Dream 10	Dream 11: Feather Weight Grand Prix 2009 Final Round	Dream 12

Dream 11: Feather Weight Grand Prix 2009 Final Round was a mixed martial arts event promoted by Fighting and Entertainment Group's mixed martial arts promotion Dream held on October 6, 2009.

== Background ==
Dream 11 was the culmination of the Feather Weight Grand Prix, where both the semifinals and finals took place in the same night. It also featured the semifinals of the Super Hulk Grand Prix 2009. Additionally, there was a championship bout: Joachim Hansen defended the Dream Lightweight Championship against Shinya Aoki.

Dream's featherweight division has a 63 kilograms (139 lb) weight limit.

== Results ==
Featherweight Grand Prix 2009 Final
Weight class				Method	Round	Time	Notes
Featherweight	Bibiano Fernandes	def.	Hiroyuki Takaya	Decision (Split)	2	5:00	(Note: For the Dream Featherweight Championship.)
Dream Lightweight Championship bout
Lightweight	Shinya Aoki	def.	Joachim Hansen (c)	Submission (Armbar)	2	4:56	(Note: For the Dream Lightweight Championship.)
Super Fights
Lightweight	Kazushi Sakuraba	def.	Rubin Williams	Submission (Kimura)	1	2:53
Middleweight	Tatsuya Kawajiri	def.	Melchor Manibusan	TKO (Punches)	1	3:48
Super Hulk Grand Prix 2009 Semi-Finals
Super Heavyweight	Rameau Thierry Sokoudjou	def.	Bob Sapp	TKO (Punches)	1	1:31
Super Heavyweight	Ikuhisa Minowa	def.	Hong Man Choi	Submission (Heel Hook)	2	1:27
Featherweight Grand Prix 2009 Semi-Finals
Featherweight	Bibiano Fernandes	def.	Joe Warren	Submission (Armbar)	1	0:42
Featherweight	Hiroyuki Takaya	def.	Hideo Tokoro	TKO (Punches)	2	0:32
Featherweight Grand Prix 2009 Reserve bout
Featherweight	Kazuyuki Miyata	def.	Daiki Hata	Decision (Unanimous)	2	5:00

== See also ==
- Dream (mixed martial arts)
- List of Dream champions
- 2009 in DREAM

== Notes ==
- Dream 11 was the second and last Dream event to be shown live in primetime on Tokyo Broadcasting System during 2009.
- Eddie Alvarez and Gesias Cavalcante were briefly rumored to meet at Dream 11. However, due to Eddie Alvarez's contractual obligations to Bellator Fighting Championships, the fight was scrapped early in negotiations.
- Kazuyuki Miayata and Takeshi Yamazaki fought at DEEP 42 IMPACT to decide who would fight DJ.Taiki in the Feather Weight Grand Prix Reserve bout.
- An early rumored bout placed Ronaldo Souza against Jason "Mayhem" Miller in a rematch for the Dream Middleweight Championship. However, the bout was scrapped after Ronaldo Souza signed with Strikeforce.
- Though featured on the Dream 11 promotion material, Norifumi "KID" Yamamoto did not participate in the event, as he is taking a hiatus to train outside Japan, and will return to MMA competition at Dynamite!! 2009.
- Gegard Mousasi advanced to the Second Round of the Super Hulk Grand Prix after defeating Mark Hunt at Dream 9, but had to pull out of the tournament due to an injury.
- A bout between Daisuke Nakamura and Gesias Cavalcante had original been planned for Dream 11. However, due to a knee injury sustained by Calvancante, the bout was reportedly scrapped. This resulted in Nakamura being moved to Dream 12.

== 2009 Featherweight Grand Prix Bracket ==
First round
(Brazil)	Bibiano Fernandes	W Dec
(Japan)	Takafumi Otsuka
(Japan)	Masakazu Imanari	W Dec
(Japan)	Atsushi Yamamoto
(United States)	Chase Beebe
(United States)	Joe Warren	W TKO
(Japan)	Norifumi Yamamoto*
13	-Bye-
(Japan)	Yoshiro Maeda	W Dec
(United States)	Micah Miller
(South Korea)	Jong Won Kim
(Japan)	Hiroyuki Takaya	W TKO
(United States)	Abel Cullum	W Dec
(Japan)	Akiyo Nishiura
(Japan)	Daiki Hata	W Dec
(Japan)	Hideo Tokoro**

Quarterfinals
(Brazil)	Bibiano Fernandes	W Dec
(Japan)	Masakazu Imanari
(United States)	Joe Warren	W Dec
(Japan)	Norifumi Yamamoto
(Japan)	Yoshiro Maeda
(Japan)	Hiroyuki Takaya	W TKO
(United States)	Abel Cullum
(Japan)	Hideo Tokoro	W Sub

Semifinals
(Brazil)	Bibiano Fernandes	W Sub
(United States)	Joe Warren
(Japan)	Hiroyuki Takaya	W TKO
(Japan)	Hideo Tokoro

Final
(Brazil)	Bibiano Fernandes	W Dec
(Japan)	Hiroyuki Takaya

- Note: Norifumi Yamamoto was given a first-round bye so he could recover from an ankle injury he received in 2008.
- Note: Hideo Tokoro replaced Daiki Hata after Hata was unable to continue due to an eye injury.

Dream Featherweight Grand Prix Reserve Bouts:

(Japan) Kazuyuki Miyata def. (Japan) Daiki Hata at Dream 11

== Super Hulk Grand Prix 2009 Bracket ==
Quarter-finals
(Japan) Ikuhisa Minowa	W
(United States) Bob Sapp	SUB
(Cuba) José Canseco	SUB
(South Korea) Hong Man Choi	W
(South Africa) Jan Nortje	TKO
(Cameroon) Rameau Thierry Sokoudjou	W
(New Zealand) Mark Hunt	SUB
(Armenia) Gegard Mousasi	W

Semi-finals
(Japan) Ikuhisa Minowa	W
(South Korea) Hong Man Choi	SUB
(Cameroon) Rameau Thierry Sokoudjou	W
(United States) Bob Sapp*	TKO

Final
(Japan) Ikuhisa Minowa	W
(Cameroon) Rameau Thierry Sokoudjou	KO

- Note: Bob Sapp was brought back into the tournament replacing Gegard Mousasi after Mousasi was injured
