= Dream: Japan GP Final =

Mixed martial arts event in 2011

- The poster for Dream: Japan GP Final
- Promotion: Dream
- Date: July 16, 2011
- Venue: Ariake Coliseum
- City: Tokyo, Japan
- Attendance: 8,142

Event chronology
Dream: Fight for Japan!	Dream: Japan GP Final	Dream 17

Dream: Japan GP Final, also known as Dream Japan GP – 2011 Bantamweight Japan Tournament Final, was a mixed martial arts event held by Fighting and Entertainment Group's mixed martial arts promotion Dream. The event took place on July 16, 2011 at the Ariake Coliseum in Tokyo, Japan.

== Background ==
The Kenji Osawa-Keisuke Fujiwara fight was planned as a qualifier for the worldwide Dream bantamweight Grand Prix later that year.

Willamy Freire suffered a hand injury during training that forced him out of his bout with Kawajiri. He was replaced with Drew Fickett.

Todd Duffee was scheduled to face Nick Gaston at this event, but was forced out of the bout due to an undisclosed injury.

Hayato Sakurai was scheduled to fight Marius Žaromskis at this event, however an unspecified leg injury forced him out of the bout. Žaromskis instead faced Eiji Ishikawa at a catchweight of 79 kg (175 lbs).

== Results ==
Main card
Weight class				Method	Round	Time	Notes
Lightweight	Eiji Mitsuoka	def	Bruno Carvalho	unanimous decision	3	5:00
Catchweight (175 lbs)	Marius Žaromskis	def	Eiji Ishikawa	unanimous decision	3	5:00
Light Heavyweight	Tatsuya Mizuno	def	Trevor Prangley	TKO (knee and punches)	1	4:41
Bantamweight	Kenji Osawa	def	Keisuke Fujiwara	unanimous decision	3	5:00
Lightweight	Tatsuya Kawajiri	def	Drew Fickett	TKO (punches)	1	4:41
Light Heavyweight	Gegard Mousasi (c)	def	Hiroshi Izumi	TKO (punches)	1	3:28	(Note: For the Light Heavyweight Championship.)
Bantamweight Tournament Final	Hideo Tokoro	def	Masakazu Imanari	unanimous decision	3	5:00
Featherweight	Hiroyuki Takaya (c)	def	Kazuyuki Miyata	split decision	3	5:00	(Note: For the Featherweight Championship.)

== Japan Bantamweight Grand Prix 2011 Bracket ==
Quarter-finals
(Japan) Masakazu Imanari	W
(Japan) Keisuke Fujiwara	DEC
(Japan) Takafumi Otsuka	DEC
(Japan) Kenji Osawa	W
(Japan) Atsushi Yamamoto	W
(Japan) Yusaku Nakamura	TKO
(Japan) Yoshiro Maeda	SUB
(Japan) Hideo Tokoro	W

Semi-finals
(Japan) Masakazu Imanari	W
(Japan) Kenji Osawa	SUB
(Japan) Atsushi Yamamoto	DEC
(Japan) Hideo Tokoro	W

Final
(Japan) Masakazu Imanari	DEC
(Japan) Hideo Tokoro	W
