= Dynamite!! 2009 =

K-1 martial arts event

- The poster for Dynamite!! 2009
- Promotion: DREAM, K-1, Sengoku Raiden Championship
- Date: December 31, 2009
- Venue: Saitama Super Arena
- City: Saitama, Japan
- Attendance: 45,606

Event chronology
Dynamite!! 2008	Dynamite!! 2009	Dynamite!! 2010

Dynamite!! 2009 was a mixed martial arts and kickboxing event promoted by Fighting and Entertainment Group, held in the Saitama Super Arena in Saitama, Japan on December 31, 2009. The event included bouts that encompass the DREAM, Sengoku Raiden Championship, K-1, and K-1 World MAX banners. The event aired on HDNet in North America.

The event had the conclusion of the U18 K-1 KOSHIEN 62 kg Class Tournament. The Final Four, as decided from eight participants at K-1 World MAX 2009 World Championship Tournament Final in October, faced off in a one-night tournament to decide the K-1 KOSHIEN 2009 Champion.

Also, the conclusion of the DREAM Super Hulk tournament was held, continuing from the previous round which took place at Dream 11.

== Background ==
On November 25, 2009, a press conference was held to announce co-promotion between DREAM and Sengoku for Dynamite!! 2009. Currently, there are plans for seven different "DREAM vs. Sengoku" fights on the card. The planned bout between Hidehiko Yoshida and Satoshi Ishii was officially moved from Sengoku's New Year's Eve show to Dynamite!! 2009. On December 22, 2009, it was announced that DREAM Lightweight champion Shinya Aoki would not be taking on fellow DREAM fighter Tatsuya Kawajiri in a challenge for the title belt, but instead would be fighting Lightweight Champion, Mizuto Hirota to fit the DREAM vs Sengoku card, but was not a unification bout.

Masato was originally intended to face Giorgio Petrosyan, the 2009 MAX Champion, but Petrosyan fractured a bone in his right hand during his semi-final bout versus Yuya Yamamoto. The fight was billed as Masato's retirement fight.

Hideo Tokoro was scheduled to face Marlon Sandro, but Sandro pulled out on short notice due to an injury. Jong Man Kim filled in for Sandro against Tokoro.

== Results ==
DREAM Super Hulk Grand Prix 2009 Final
Weight class				Method	Round	Time	Notes
Super Heavyweight	Ikuhisa Minowa	def.	Rameau Thierry Sokoudjou	KO (Punch)	3	3:29
Sengoku Raiden Championship Heavyweight bout
Heavyweight	Hidehiko Yoshida	def.	Satoshi Ishii	Decision (Unanimous)	3	5:00
DREAM Heavyweight bout
Heavyweight	Gegard Mousasi	def.	Gary Goodridge	TKO (Punches)	1	1:34
DREAM vs Sengoku Raiden Championship MMA bouts
Heavyweight	Hiroshi Izumi	def.	Katsuyori Shibata	Decision (Unanimous)	3	5:00
Featherweight	Michihiro Omigawa	def.	Hiroyuki Takaya	TKO (Punches)	1	2:54
Welterweight	Akihiro Gono	def.	Hayato Sakurai	Submission (Armbar)	2	3:56
Middleweight	Melvin Manhoef	def.	Kazuo Misaki	TKO (Punches)	1	1:49
Featherweight	Hideo Tokoro	def.	Jong Man Kim	Decision (Unanimous)	3	5:00
Lightweight	Tatsuya Kawajiri	def.	Kazunori Yokota	Decision (Unanimous)	3	5:00
Featherweight	Masanori Kanehara	def.	Norifumi Yamamoto	Decision (Unanimous)	3	5:00
Heavyweight	Alistair Overeem	def.	Kazuyuki Fujita	KO (Knee)	1	1:15
Lightweight	Shinya Aoki	def.	Mizuto Hirota	Technical Submission (Hammerlock)	1	1:17	(Note: Shinya Aoki submitted Mizuto Hirota using a hammerlock that broke Hirota's arm.)
K-1 card
K-1 MAX	Masato	def.	Andy Souwer	Unanimous Decision	5	3:00
K-1 Heavyweight	Ray Sefo	def.	Yosuke Nishijima	Unanimous Decision (3-0)	3	3:00
K-1 KOSHIEN 62 kg Class Tournament Final
K-1 KOSHIEN 62 kg	Masaaki Noiri	def.	Shota Shimada	Unanimous Decision (3-0)	3	2:00
K-1 KOSHIEN 62 kg Class Tournament Semi-Finals
K-1 KOSHIEN 62 kg	Shota Shimada	def.	Katsuki Ishida	Majority Decision (2-0)	3	2:00
K-1 KOSHIEN 62 kg	Masaaki Noiri	def.	Hiroya	Unanimous Decision (3-0)	3	2:00
K-1 KOSHIEN 62 kg Class Tournament Reserve Fight
K-1 KOSHIEN 62 kg	Tsukasa Fuji	def.	Tatuya Kusakabe	Majority Decision (2-0)	3	2:00

== Super Hulk Grand Prix 2009 Bracket ==
Quarter-finals
(Japan) Ikuhisa Minowa	SUB
(United States) Bob Sapp
(Cuba) José Canseco
(South Korea) Hong Man Choi	SUB
(South Africa) Jan Nortje
(Cameroon) Rameau Thierry Sokoudjou	TKO
(New Zealand) Mark Hunt
(Armenia) Gegard Mousasi	SUB

Semi-finals
(Japan) Ikuhisa Minowa	SUB
(South Korea) Hong Man Choi
(Cameroon) Rameau Thierry Sokoudjou	TKO
(United States) Bob Sapp*

Final
(Japan) Ikuhisa Minowa	TKO
(Cameroon) Rameau Thierry Sokoudjou

- Note: Bob Sapp was brought back into the tournament replacing Gegard Mousasi due to injury.

== K-1 KOSHIEN 62kg 2009 Bracket ==
Quarter-finals
(Japan) Katsuki Ishida	DEC
(Japan) Tsukasa Fuji	3–0
(Japan) Hiroki Akimoto	3–0
(Japan) Shota Shimada	DEC
(Japan) Masaaki Noiri	DEC
(Japan) Keisuke Miyamoto	3–0
(Japan) Hiroya	DEC
(Japan) Ryuya Kusakabe	3–0

Semi-finals
(Japan) Katsuki Ishida	3–0
(Japan) Shota Shimada	DEC
(Japan) Masaaki Noiri	DEC
(Japan) Hiroya	3–0

Final
(Japan) Shota Shimada	3–0
(Japan) Masaaki Noiri	DEC

== DREAM vs. Sengoku results ==
This event marked the first inter-promotional fights between Japanese MMA organizations DREAM and Sengoku Raiden Championship. Leading into the main event, each organization had won 4 respective bouts. Shinya Aoki's submission victory resulted in the tie-breaking win, giving DREAM the final winning result of 5 wins and 4 losses.

Contestants	Results	
Contestants	Dream	Sengoku
Shinya Aoki vs. Mizuto Hirota	WIN	LOSS
Alistair Overeem vs. Kazuyuki Fujita	WIN	LOSS
Norifumi Yamamoto vs. Masanori Kanehara	LOSS	WIN
Tatsuya Kawajiri vs. Kazunori Yokota	WIN	LOSS
Hideo Tokoro vs. Jong Man Kim	WIN	LOSS
Melvin Manhoef vs. Kazuo Misaki	WIN	LOSS
Hayato Sakurai vs. Akihiro Gono	LOSS	WIN
Hiroyuki Takaya vs. Michihiro Omigawa	LOSS	WIN
Katsuyori Shibata vs. Hiroshi Izumi	LOSS	WIN

== See also ==
- Dream (mixed martial arts)
- List of Dream champions
- 2009 in DREAM
