= Fight For Japan: Genki Desu Ka Omisoka 2011 =

Martial arts event in 2011

- The poster for Fight For Japan: Genki Desu Ka Omisoka 2011
- Promotion: Dream, Inoki Genome Federation, M-1 Global
- Date: December 31, 2011
- Venue: Saitama Super Arena
- City: Saitama, Japan
- Attendance: 24,606

Event chronology
Dynamite!! 2010	Fight For Japan: Genki Desu Ka Omisoka 2011	GSI Presents Dream 18 - Special NYE 2012

Fight For Japan: Genki Desu Ka Omisoka 2011, also known as Fight for Japan. How are you! New Year! 2011 was a mixed martial arts, puroresu and kickboxing event in the annual New Year's Eve event promoted by FEG, M-1 Global and the Inoki Genome Federation that took place on December 31, 2011 at the Saitama Super Arena in Saitama, Japan.

== Background ==
The event included bouts that encompassed the Dream, K-1 World MAX and IGF banners. The event aired live on HDNet in North America, SKY PerfecTV! in Japan, and also online through Nico Nico Douga.

The semi-finals and finals of Dream's World Bantamweight Grand Prix were held at this event.

The Nagashima/Kikuno mixed rules bout consisted of a three-minute first round under K-1 rules and a five-minute second round under Dram rules.

Kazushi Sakuraba was rumoured to be involved in a puroresu bout on this card.

Tim Sylvia was expected to face Brett Rogers at this event, however the bout was scrapped because Rogers was unable to obtain a visa to enter Japan. This was due to Rogers's domestic violence charge which was followed by a series of what were known as 'shaft grabbing' incidents.

== Results ==
DREAM Rules
Weight class				Method	Round	Time	Notes
Heavyweight	Fedor Emelianenko	def.	Satoshi Ishii	KO (Punches)	1	2:29
Lightweight	Shinya Aoki (c)	def.	Satoru Kitaoka	Decision (Unanimous)	3	5:00	(Note: For the DREAM Lightweight Championship.)
Featherweight	Hiroyuki Takaya	def.	Takeshi Inoue	Decision (unanimous)	3	5:00	(Note: For the DREAM Featherweight Championship)
IGF Rules Bout	Kazushi Sakuraba and Katsuyori Shibata	def.	Atsushi Sawada and Shinichi Suzukawa	TKO (Referee Stoppage)	1	13:46
IGF Rules Bout	Kazuyuki Fujita	def.	Peter Aerts	Submission (Boston crab)	1	3:36
Special Rules bout	Yuichiro Nagashima	def.	Katsunori Kikuno	TKO (punches)	2	2:34
IGF Rules Bout	Josh Barnett	def.	Hideki Suzuki	Pinfall	1	11:47
Women's Strawweight	Megumi Fujii	def.	Karla Benitez	Submission (armbar)	1	1:15
Featherweight	Tatsuya Kawajiri	def.	Kazuyuki Miyata	Submission (Arm triangle choke)	2	4:54
Welterweight	Hayato Sakurai	def.	Ryo Chonan	Decision (Unanimous)	3	5:00
Kickboxing(-63 kg)	Yuta Kubo	def.	Nils Widlund	KO (High Kick)	3	1:10
DREAM/Kickboxing Special Rules
Kickboxing(-63 kg)	Masaaki Noiri	def.	Kengo Sonoda	Decision (unanimous)	3	3:00
Kickboxing Rules
Bantamweight Tournament Final	Bibiano Fernandes	vs.	Antonio Banuelos	TKO (punches)	1	1:21
Bantamweight Tournament Semifinal Bout	Bibiano Fernandes	def.	Rodolfo Marques	Decision (unanimous)	3	5:00
Bantamweight Tournament Semifinal Bout	Antonio Banuelos	def.	Masakazu Imanari	Decision (split)	3	5:00
Bantamweight Tournament Reserve Bout	Yusup Saadulaev	def.	Hideo Tokoro	KO (slam)	1	0:42

== World Bantamweight Grand Prix 2011 Bracket ==
Quarterfinals (Dream 17)
(Japan) Masakazu Imanari	W
(United States) Abel Cullum	SUB
(Japan) Hideo Tokoro	DEC
(United States) Antonio Banuelos	W
(Brazil) Bibiano Fernandes	W
(Japan) Takafumi Otsuka	SUB
(Russia) Yusup Saadulaev	DEC
(Brazil) Rodolfo Marques	W

Semifinals (Fight For Japan: Genki Desu Ka Omisoka)
(Japan) Masakazu Imanari	DEC
(United States) Antonio Banuelos	W
(Brazil) Bibiano Fernandes	W
(Brazil) Rodolfo Marques	DEC

Final (Fight For Japan: Genki Desu Ka Omisoka)
(United States) Antonio Banuelos	TKO
(Brazil) Bibiano Fernandes	W
