= List of Dream champions =

This is a list of champions in the Dream organization at each weight class. Dream was a Japanese mixed martial arts organization, originally promoted by Fighting and Entertainment Group, and over management of Glory Sports International since October 2012. The first two champions were crowned after the 2008 Lightweight and Middleweight Grand Prix, while the 2009 Welterweight and Featherweight GPs have crowned the champions at those weights. The 2010 Light Heavyweight Grand Prix crowned the first Dream Light Heavyweight Champion at Dream 16. The 2011 World Bantamweight Grand Prix crowned the first ever Dream Bantamweight Champion at Dynamite!!! 2011.

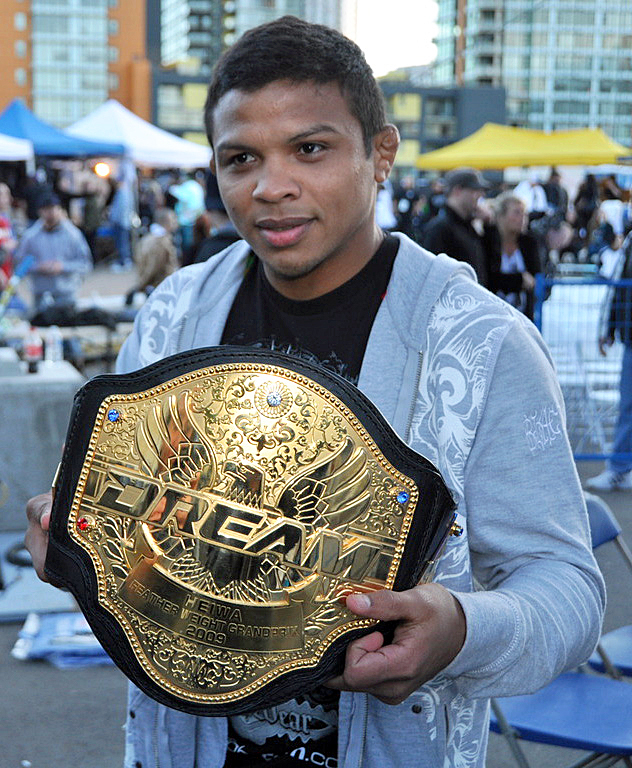
Former two division champion Bibiano Fernandes.

== Last champions ==
Division	Champion	Since	Defenses
Heavyweight	(Netherlands) Alistair Overeem	December 31, 2010	0
Light Heavyweight	(Netherlands) Gegard Mousasi	September 25, 2010	1
Middleweight	(Netherlands) Gegard Mousasi	September 23, 2008	0
Welterweight	(Lithuania) Marius Zaromskis	July 20, 2009	1
Lightweight	(Japan) Shinya Aoki	October 6, 2009	2
Featherweight	(Japan) Hiroyuki Takaya	December 31, 2010	2
Bantamweight	(Brazil) Bibiano Fernandes	December 31, 2011	0

== Title history ==
=== Heavyweight championship ===
Weight limit: Unlimited

No.	Name	Event	Date	Reign	Defenses
1	(Netherlands) Alistair Overeem def. Todd Duffee	Dynamite!! 2010; Saitama, Saitama, Japan	December 31, 2010	521 days	

=== Light heavyweight championship ===
Weight limit: 95 kg (209.4 lb)

No.	Name	Event	Date	Reign	Defenses
1	(Netherlands) Gegard Mousasi def. Tatsuya Mizuno	Dream 16; Nagoya, Aichi, Japan	September 25, 2010	618 days	1. def. Hiroshi Izumi at Dream: Japan GP Final on Jul 16, 2011 in Saitama, Japan

=== Middleweight championship ===
Weight limit: 85 kg (187.4 lb)

No.	Name	Event	Date	Reign	Defenses
1	(Netherlands) Gegard Mousasi def. Ronaldo Souza	Dream 6 Saitama, Saitama, Japan	September 23, 2008	267 days	
Title vacated after Mousasi moved up to light heavyweight.
Ronaldo Souza and Jason Miller fought to a No-Contest (cut via illegal soccer kick) on May 26, 2009, at Dream 9 in Yokohama, Japan for the vacant title.

=== Welterweight championship ===
Weight limit: 77 kg (169.8 lb)

No.	Name	Event	Date	Reign	Defenses
1	(Lithuania) Marius Zaromskis def. Jason High	Dream 10; Saitama, Saitama, Japan	July 20, 2009	1050 days	1. def. Kazushi Sakuraba at Dynamite!! 2010 on Dec 31, 2010 in Saitama, Japan

=== Lightweight championship ===
Weight limit: 70 kg (154.3 lb)

No.	Name	Event	Date	Reign	Defenses
1	(Norway) Joachim Hansen def. Shinya Aoki	Dream 5 Osaka, Osaka, Japan	July 21, 2008	442 days	
2	(Japan) Shinya Aoki	Dream 11; Yokohama, Kanagawa, Japan	October 6, 2009	972 days	1. def. Tatsuya Kawajiri at Dream 15 on Jul 10, 2010 in Saitama, Japan; 2. def. Satoru Kitaoka at Fight For Japan: Genki Desu Ka Omisoka 2011 on Dec 31, 2011 in Saitama, Japan

=== Featherweight championship ===
Weight limit: 65 kg (143.3 lb)

No.	Name	Event	Date	Reign	Defenses
1	(Brazil) Bibiano Fernandes def. Hiroyuki Takaya	Dream 11; Yokohama, Kanagawa, Japan	October 6, 2009	451 days	1. def. Joachim Hansen at Dream 13 on Mar 22, 2010 in Yokohama, Japan
2	(Japan) Hiroyuki Takaya	Dynamite!! 2010; Saitama, Saitama, Japan	December 31, 2010	521 days	1. def. Kazuyuki Miyata at Dream: Japan GP Final on Jul 16, 2011 in Saitama, Japan; 2. def. Takeshi Inoue at Fight for Japan 2011 on Dec 31, 2011 in Saitama, Japan

=== Bantamweight championship ===
Weight limit: 60 kg (132.3 lb)

No.	Name	Event	Date	Reign	Defenses
1	(Brazil) Bibiano Fernandes def. Antonio Banuelos	Fight For Japan: Genki Desu Ka Omisoko 2011; Saitama, Saitama, Japan	December 31, 2011	156 days	

== Tournament winners ==
Division	Event	Date	Winner	Runner-up
Lightweight	Dream 5	Jul 21, 2008	(Norway) Joachim Hansen	(Japan) Shinya Aoki
Middleweight	Dream 6	Sep 23, 2008	(Netherlands) Gegard Mousasi	(Brazil) Ronaldo Souza
Welterweight	Dream 10	Jul 20, 2009	(Lithuania) Marius Zaromskis	(United States) Jason High
Featherweight	Dream 11	Oct 6, 2009	(Brazil) Bibiano Fernandes	(Japan) Hiroyuki Takaya
Open-weight	Dynamite!! 2009	Dec 31, 2009	(Japan) Ikuhisa Minowa	(Cameroon) Rameau Thierry Sokoudjou
Light Heavyweight	Dream 16	Sep 25, 2010	(Netherlands) Gegard Mousasi	(Japan) Tatsuya Mizuno
Bantamweight	Dream: Japan GP Final	Jul 26, 2011	(Japan) Hideo Tokoro	(Japan) Masakazu Imanari
Bantamweight	Dynamite!! 2011	Dec 31, 2011	(Brazil) Bibiano Fernandes	(United States) Antonio Banuelos

== By nationality ==
Fighters with multiple title reigns in a specific division are only counted once. Interim champions who never became linear champions are only listed in parentheses.

Country	Division	Tournament	Total
Netherlands	3	2	5
Japan	2	2	4
Brazil	2	2	4
Norway	1	1	2
Lithuania	1	1	2

== See also ==
- List of current mixed martial arts champions
- List of Bellator MMA champions
- List of EliteXC champions
- List of Invicta FC champions
- List of ONE Championship champions
- List of Pancrase champions
- List of Pride champions
- List of PFL champions
- List of Shooto champions
- List of Strikeforce champions
- List of UFC champions
- List of WEC champions
- Mixed martial arts weight classes
