= Norifumi Yamamoto =

Japanese martial artist (1977–2018)

- Born: March 15, 1977; Kawasaki, Japan
- Died: September 18, 2018 (aged 41); Dededo, Guam
- Other names: KID
- Height: 5 ft 4 in (1.63 m)
- Weight: 135 lb (61 kg; 9 st 9 lb)
- Division: Bantamweight (2010–2018); Featherweight (2002–2009); Lightweight (2001)
- Reach: 66 in (168 cm)
- Style: Kickboxing, Wrestling, Shotokan Karate, Shootfighting, Combat wrestling
- Fighting out of: Tokyo, Japan
- Team: Krazy Bee; Purebred Tokyo Killer Bee (2003–2007); Purebred Omiya (2001–2002)
- Years active: 2001–2018

Kickboxing record
- Total: 5
- Wins: 1
- By knockout: 1
- Losses: 4
- By knockout: 2

Mixed martial arts record
- Total: 26
- Wins: 18
- By knockout: 13
- By submission: 2
- By decision: 3
- Losses: 6
- By knockout: 1
- By submission: 1
- By decision: 4
- No contests: 2

Other information
- Spouse: Malia (m. 2004; div. 2009)
- Children: 3
- Notable school: Marcos de Niza High School
- Mixed martial arts record from Sherdog

Norifumi Yamamoto (山本 徳郁, Yamamoto Norifumi; March 15, 1977 – September 18, 2018) was a Japanese mixed martial artist and kickboxer who competed in the bantamweight division of the UFC. He quickly gained popularity in the Shooto organization due to his aggressive, well-rounded style and controversial persona. He moved on to K-1 Hero's, where he became the K-1 Hero's 2005 Middleweight Grand Prix Tournament Champion in December, 2005 after defeating Genki Sudo via a controversial TKO due to punches.

Though by most measures he was a natural bantamweight, many of Yamamoto's most significant bouts came in the lightweight division as it was the lightest division in Hero's. Later in his career, Yamamoto competed in the Ultimate Fighting Championship in the bantamweight division, although he did not perform well there, going winless in his four fights with the promotion.

== Background ==
Yamamoto came from a wrestling family. His father Ikuei Yamamoto represented Japan at the 1972 Olympic games in Munich and his sisters Miyuu Yamamoto and Seiko both won world championships in freestyle wrestling. Kid received his education in the United States and wrestled at Marcos de Niza High School in Tempe, Arizona, capturing three state championships (with a third-place finish as a freshman). During that time he lived and received training from Townsend and Tricia Saunders. He also trained briefly under Choi Mu Bae. At the age of 21, Yamamoto made a transition from wrestling to mixed martial arts despite his father's opinion that MMA is not a real sport. His first trainer in the sport was Enson Inoue, fiancé of Yamamoto's sister at the time.

== Mixed martial arts career ==
=== Shooto ===
Yamamoto made his professional mixed martial arts debut on March 2, 2001, against Masato Shiozawa at Shooto - To The Top 2, where he won by unanimous decision. He would go on to win his next two fights, both by TKO in the first round.

During this time Yamamoto faced future Strikeforce Lightweight Champion Josh Thomson in Honolulu, Hawaii, at Shogun 1. Yamamoto dominated Thomson with takedowns and strikes but caught an accidental kick to the groin three minutes into round two, causing the bout to be ruled a no contest.

On May 5, 2002, Yamamoto suffered his first loss by TKO to Stephen Palling. As Yamamoto shot in for a double-leg takedown, Palling countered with a knee, opening a huge cut to Yamamoto's face. Though Yamamoto succeeded in slamming Palling, blood began pouring out of the cut and the referee stopped the fight. The doctors determined that Yamamoto was unable to continue and Palling was declared the winner.

Kid went on to win his next three fights over Tetsuo Katsuta, Jeff Curran and Caleb Mitchell.

=== Hero's ===
Yamamoto made his K-1 Hero's debut on April 7, 2004, at the K-1 World MAX 2004 World Tournament Open, where he choked out Tony Valente only 58 seconds into the fight. Over the next year, Yamamoto's popularity grew as he went on to defeat Kazuya Yasuhiro, Jadamba Narantungalag and Ian James Schaffa in exciting fashion.

Yamamoto would then write his name into K-1 Hero's history by defeating three highly regarded fighters—Royler Gracie, Caol Uno and Genki Sudo—to win the 2005 Middleweight Grand Prix.

==== Four-second knockout ====
On May 3, 2006, Yamamoto made mixed martial arts history when he knocked out Kazuyuki Miyata four seconds into the fight with a flying knee moments after the bell sounded. It was the fastest ever knockout in a major MMA promotion.

=== Olympic freestyle wrestling ===
In early 2007, Yamamoto announced an indefinite leave of absence from MMA to go back to his roots and train for and compete in freestyle wrestling for the 2008 Summer Olympics in Beijing. He had hoped to win the Olympic Gold medal for freestyle wrestling ever since he was a child, as his father Ikuei Yamamoto represented Japan in the 1972 Olympic games in Munich. In qualifying, Yamamoto began with an impressive win over Japanese Self Defense Forces member Akihiro Tsuchida. Yamamoto looked nimble and explosive against Tsuchida, who had taken third in the 132-pound freestyle class at the 2006 Emperor's Cup. However disaster struck in the semifinals against 2004 Athens Bronze Medalist Kenji Inoue, when in the first move of the match, an arm-whip takedown by Inoue, Yamamoto dislocated his right elbow, and was consequently prone for the easy pinfall. With this injury, Yamamoto had no choice but to leave his hopes of competing in the Olympic Games and return to mixed martial arts.

=== Return to Hero's ===
Yamamoto's return to MMA came on September 17, 2007, against future Dream Featherweight Champion Bibiano Fernandes at K-1 Hero's 10. Yamamoto won the fight by unanimous decision. At K-1 Hero's Dynamite!! 2007 on December 31 Yamamoto faced WEC veteran Rani Yahya at Bantamweight . Yamamoto won in the second round via TKO due to soccer and ground kicks.

=== DREAM ===
In February 2008, Fighting and Entertainment Group launched Dream, a new MMA promotion intended to be the successor to Hero's. Norifumi Yamamoto was one of the many former Pride and Hero's fighters that was announced to be competing in the new promotion.. He was supposed to make his Dream debut at Dream 5 against Joseph Benavidez, but the bout was abruptly called off three days before the event to a knee injury suffered by Yamamoto.

Yamamoto next announced his participation in the Dream Featherweight Grand Prix, which began at Dream.7. Due to an injury, he did not compete until the second round where, at Dream.9 on May 26, he faced future Bellator Champion Joe Warren. Despite having a significant experience advantage against the newcomer Warren, Yamamoto lost by split decision. This was regarded as a huge upset at the time considering Warren (2-0 MMA record at the time) ended Yamamoto's 14-fight winning streak.

Yamamoto lost to SRC Featherweight Champion Masanori Kanehara via unanimous decision at Dynamite!! 2009 on New Year's Eve.

Yamamoto was expected to make his Strikeforce debut against Team Quest fighter Federico Lopez at Strikeforce: Heavy Artillery, but was later pulled out by DREAM and fought Lopez at Dream 14 instead. Yamamoto defeated Lopez via TKO (Punches), claiming his first victory after two consecutive upset losses. In preparation for the fight Yamamoto decided to "reinvent" himself, moving to Okinawa to train under former WBA Light Welterweight Champion Akinobu Hiranaka.

=== Ultimate Fighting Championship ===
Yamamoto made his UFC debut against future UFC Flyweight Champion Demetrious Johnson at UFC 126. Unable to fend off Johnson's constant takedowns, he lost the fight via unanimous decision.

He was then expected to face Chris Cariaso on May 28, 2011, at UFC 130. However, Yamamoto was forced out of the bout with an injury and replaced by Michael McDonald. Another bout was scheduled with Damacio Page at UFC 135 on September 24, 2011. It too was scrapped on September 1 after both fighters sustained injuries in training.

Yamamoto then fought Darren Uyenoyama on November 12, 2011, at UFC on Fox: Velasquez vs. Dos Santos. Despite hurting Uyenoyama several times, including a knockdown in the second round, Yamamoto lost via unanimous decision after Uyenoyama controlled him on the ground for the majority of the fight.

Yamamoto's next bout was against Vaughan Lee on February 26, 2012, at UFC 144. Yamamoto rocked Lee early in the opening round with a right hand, but minutes later was wobbled by a right hook-uppercut combination from the Brit. He immediately took Lee down, but got caught in a triangle choke; Lee then switched to an armbar, handing Yamamoto his first ever loss by submission.

Yamamoto was expected to face Ivan Menjivar on September 21, 2013, at UFC 165. However, Yamamoto was removed from the bout and was replaced by Wilson Reis.

Yamamoto returned from a three-year hiatus to face Roman Salazar on February 28, 2015, at UFC 184. The bout was declared a no contest after an accidental eye poke by Yamamoto rendered Salazar unable to continue midway through the second round.

Yamamoto was expected to face Matt Hobar on September 27, 2015, at UFC Fight Night 75. However, the bout was scrapped as both fighters suffered injuries during the week leading up to the event.

Yamamoto was scheduled to face Chris Beal on June 18, 2016, at UFC Fight Night 89. However, Yamamoto was scratched from the bout on May 26 for an undisclosed injury. He was replaced by Joe Soto.

== Kickboxing career ==
Yamamoto faced Masato at K-1 Premium 2004 Dynamite!! in a highly anticipated match up under K-1 Rules, and lost via decision. The fight did a 31.6 rating and was watched by more than 34 million viewers.

Kid Yamamoto lost to Amateur Kickboxer Percy Ramos, at the Fighter of the Year tournament, 2006 by TKO into the fourth round.

Yamamoto then faced Mike Zambidis at the K-1 World Max 2005 Tournament, he would also lose this bout by KO early into the third round.

On July 13, 2009, Yamamoto was defeated by Korean kickboxer Jae Hee Cheon via KO at K-1 World MAX 2009 World Championship Tournament Final 8. He is now 1-3 under K-1 Rules.

== Personal life ==
Yamamoto was married to Japanese female fashion model MALIA (マリア,新保真里有), with whom he had two sons and a daughter. They divorced in 2009.

== Death ==
On August 26, 2018, Yamamoto wrote on his Instagram that he had been diagnosed with cancer. On September 18, 2018, Yamamoto died from stomach cancer. The type of cancer was revealed by Rizin founder Nobuyuki Sakakibara, with permission from Yamamoto's father. In the same interview, Sakakibara revealed that the cancer was diagnosed as early as 2016, but Yamamoto hid it from the public. In the beginning of 2018, Yamamoto's condition worsened to a point where his father flew him to Guam to receive treatment for his terminal cancer.

== Championships and accomplishments ==
=== Mixed martial arts ===
- K-1 Hero's
  - Hero's 2005 Middleweight Grand Prix Tournament Winner
  - Fastest Recorded Knockout (0:04)
- Shooto
  - All Japan Amateur Shooto Tournament Winner
- MMA Fighting
  - 2005 Featherweight Fighter of the Year

=== Amateur wrestling ===
- Japan Wrestling Federation
  - All-Japan Emperor's Cup Senior Freestyle National Championship 4th Place (2007)
  - All-Japan Emperor's Cup Senior Freestyle National Championship Runner-up (1999)
- Arizona Interscholastic Association
  - AIA High School State Championship (1995, 1996, 1997)
  - AIA High School State Championship 3rd Place (1994)
  - Scholastic Career Record: 112-4 (1993-1997)

== Mixed martial arts record ==
Professional record breakdown
26 matches	18 wins	6 losses
By knockout	13	1
By submission	2	1
By decision	3	4
No contests	2	

Res.	Record	Opponent	Method	Event	Date	Round	Time	Location	Notes
NC	18–6 (2)	Roman Salazar	NC (accidental eye poke)	UFC 184	February 28, 2015	2	2:37	Los Angeles, California, United States	Accidental eye poke rendered Salazar unable to continue.
Loss	18–6 (1)	Vaughan Lee	Submission (armbar)	UFC 144	February 26, 2012	1	4:29	Saitama, Japan	
Loss	18–5 (1)	Darren Uyenoyama	Decision (unanimous)	UFC on Fox: Velasquez vs. Dos Santos	November 12, 2011	3	5:00	Anaheim, California, United States	
Loss	18–4 (1)	Demetrious Johnson	Decision (unanimous)	UFC 126	February 5, 2011	3	5:00	Las Vegas, Nevada, United States	Return to Bantamweight.
Win	18–3 (1)	Federico Lopez	KO (punches)	Dream 14	May 29, 2010	1	1:41	Saitama, Japan	Catchweight (132 lb) bout.
Loss	17–3 (1)	Masanori Kanehara	Decision (unanimous)	Dynamite!! 2009	December 31, 2009	3	5:00	Saitama, Japan	
Loss	17–2 (1)	Joe Warren	Decision (split)	Dream 9	May 26, 2009	2	5:00	Yokohama, Japan	Return to Featherweight. 2009 Dream Featherweight Grand Prix Quarterfinal.
Win	17–1 (1)	Rani Yahya	TKO (punches and soccer kicks)	K-1 Premium 2007 Dynamite!!	December 31, 2007	2	3:11	Osaka, Japan	
Win	16–1 (1)	Bibiano Fernandes	Decision (unanimous)	K-1 Hero's: Grand Prix Final	September 17, 2007	3	5:00	Yokohama, Japan	
Win	15–1 (1)	István Majoros	TKO (punches)	K-1 PREMIUM 2006 Dynamite!!	December 31, 2006	1	3:46	Osaka, Japan	
Win	14–1 (1)	Kazuyuki Miyata	KO (flying knee)	Hero's 5	May 3, 2006	1	0:04	Tokyo, Japan	
Win	13–1 (1)	Genki Sudo	TKO (punches)	K-1 PREMIUM 2005 Dynamite!!	December 31, 2005	1	4:39	Osaka, Japan	Won the 2005 Hero's Lightweight Grand Prix and the inaugural K-1 Hero's Lightweight Championship.
Win	12–1 (1)	Caol Uno	TKO (doctor stoppage)	Hero's 3	September 7, 2005	2	4:04	Tokyo, Japan	2005 Hero's Lightweight Grand Prix Semifinal.
Win	11–1 (1)	Royler Gracie	KO (punch)	Hero's 3	September 7, 2005	2	0:38	Tokyo, Japan	2005 Hero's Lightweight Grand Prix Quarterfinal.
Win	10–1 (1)	Ian James Schaffa	TKO (punches)	Hero's 2	July 6, 2005	3	1:23	Tokyo, Japan	2005 Hero's Lightweight Grand Prix Round of 16.
Win	9–1 (1)	Jadamba Narantungalag	KO (punches)	K-1 MAX: Champions Challenge 2004	October 13, 2004	1	1:55	Tokyo, Japan	
Win	8–1 (1)	Kazuya Yasuhiro	Submission (armbar)	K-1 MAX: 2004 World Grand Prix Final	July 7, 2004	2	2:40	Tokyo, Japan	
Win	7–1 (1)	Tony Valente	Submission (rear-naked choke)	K-1 MAX: 2004 World Grand Prix Opening Round	April 7, 2004	1	0:58	Tokyo, Japan	Lightweight debut.
Win	6–1 (1)	Caleb Mitchell	KO (punch)	Shooto: 9/5 in Korakuen Hall	September 5, 2003	1	0:40	Tokyo, Japan	Bantamweight bout.
Win	5–1 (1)	Jeff Curran	Decision (unanimous)	SuperBrawl 29	May 9, 2003	3	5:00	Honolulu, Hawaii, United States	Featherweight debut.
Win	4–1 (1)	Tetsuo Katsuta	TKO (punches)	Shooto: Treasure Hunt 10	September 16, 2002	1	2:45	Yokohama, Japan	
Loss	3–1 (1)	Stephen Palling	TKO (doctor stoppage)	Shooto: Treasure Hunt 6	May 5, 2002	1	0:30	Tokyo, Japan	Return to Bantamweight.
NC	3–0 (1)	Josh Thomson	NC (accidental groin kick)	Shogun 1	December 15, 2001	2	2:00	Honolulu, Hawaii, United States	Accidental groin kick rendered Yamamoto unable to continue.
Win	3–0	Hideki Kadowaki	KO (punches)	Shooto - To The Top 8	September 2, 2001	1	4:02	Tokyo, Japan	Lightweight debut.
Win	2–0	Masashi Kameda	KO (punch)	Shooto: To The Top 6	July 6, 2001	1	4:17	Tokyo, Japan	
Win	1–0	Masato Shiozawa	Decision (unanimous)	Shooto: To The Top 2	March 2, 2001	2	5:00	Tokyo, Japan	Bantamweight debut.

== Kickboxing record ==
Professional record breakdown
5 matches	1 win	4 losses
By knockout	1	3
By decision	0	1

Date	Result	Opponent	Event	Method	Round	Time	Location
December 31, 2015	Ex.	Masato	Kyokugen	Exhibition	3	3:00	Japan
July 13, 2009	Loss	Jae hee Cheon	K-1 World MAX 2009 World Championship Tournament Final 8	KO (Left Hook)	1	1:20	Nippon Budokan, Tokyo, Japan
May 4, 2005	Loss	Mike Zambidis	K-1 World Max 2005 Opening	KO (Right Hook)	3	2:09	Ariake Coliseum, Tokyo, Japan
December 31, 2004	Loss	Masato	K-1 Premium Dynamite 2004	Decision (Majority)	3	5:00	Kyocera Dome, Osaka, Japan
February 24, 2004	Win	Takehiro Murahama	K-1 World MAX 2004 Japan Tournament	TKO (Referee Stoppage)	2	2:38	Yoyogi National Gymnasium, Tokyo, Japan
Dec 26, 2006	Loss	Percy Ramos	Fighter of the Year Tournament	TKO	4	2:16	Los Angeles Memorial Coliseum, Los Angeles, California

== Submission grappling record ==
Result	Opponent	Method	Event	Date	Round	Time	Notes
Loss	(United States) Baret Yoshida	TKO (corner stoppage)	THE CONTENDERS Millennium-1	2001			
Win	(Japan) Jiro Wakabayashi	Decision (unanimous)	THE CONTENDERS Millennium-1	2001			
Win	(Japan) Koji Komuro	Decision (unanimous)	THE CONTENDERS Millennium-1	2001			

== See also ==
- List of male mixed martial artists
