= Sadaharu Tanikawa =

Japanese journalist (born 1961)

Sadaharu Tanikawa (谷川貞治, Tanikawa Sadaharu) (27 September 1961 in Nagoya) is a Japanese combat sports promoter and was previously the president of Fighting and Entertainment Group.

== Early life ==
Tanikawa graduated from Nihon University College of Law and worked as a journalist and executive at various sports media, most notably puroresu.

== Career as a promoter ==
After K-1 founder Kazuyoshi Ishii's resignation, Tanikawa became the president of the newly founded Fighting and Entertainment Group that was established in September 2003 to encompass K-1 as well as subsidiary mixed martial arts and puroresu promotions.

In January 2011, Tanikawa announced that current conditions indicated that the Fighting and Entertainment Group was likely to end. On April 5, 2012, Tanikawa announced that he resigned from his position in K-1, which was mostly sold to the real estate firm Barbizon Co. Ltd. on July 28, 2011. On May 16, 2012, Tanikawa officially declared the bankruptcy of FEG.

== See also ==
- Kazuyoshi Ishii
- Pierre Andurand
- Chatri Sityodtong
- Simon Rutz
- Eduard Irimia
