= Dynamite!! 2010 =

K-1 martial arts event in 2010

- The poster for Dynamite!! 2010
- Promotion: DREAM, K-1
- Date: December 31, 2010
- Venue: Saitama Super Arena
- City: Saitama, Japan
- Attendance: 26,729

Event chronology
Dynamite!! 2009	Dynamite!! 2010	Dynamite!! 2011

Dynamite!! 2010 was a mixed martial arts and kickboxing event in the annual New Year's Eve event promoted by Fighting and Entertainment Group that took place on December 31, 2010 at the Saitama Super Arena in Saitama, Japan. The event included bouts that encompass the DREAM, K-1 and K-1 World MAX banners. Just as the previous Dynamite!! 2009, with the official commentator Nozomi Sasaki, the event aired on TBS in Japan and HDNet in North America.

== Background ==
FEG president Tanikawa had stated that the company planned on holding an event together with Sengoku Raiden Championship and this event may have a similar DREAM vs SRC format as Dynamite!! 2009. However, this did not happen as SRC held its own event, World Victory Road Presents: Soul of Fight.

Tanikawa has also stated that this Dynamite!! event will most likely be shortened (to around three hours) and the annual K-1 Koshien tournament will not take place at this event.

The title fight between Bibiano Fernandes and Hiroyuki Takaya was the last in the 63 kg. (139 lbs) weight class before it gets broken into the standard MMA bantamweight and featherweight divisions. DREAM plans on holding a Grand Prix in whichever of the two weight classes the champion does not decide to fight in. After winning the title, Hiroyuki Takaya stated that he would become the Featherweight (145 lbs) Champion.

The Aoki/Nagashima fight was first announced that there would be an alternate of four rounds, with one round under MMA rules and the next round, then they will change gloves and, fight under kickboxing rules. A coin toss will determine what rules they start under. However, it has later announced that the fight will feature one three-minute kickboxing round, followed by a standard five-minute MMA round. The fighters used open-fingered gloves throughout. If no winner were decided in the eight minutes of competition, the fight would have been declared an automatic draw.

A fight between Bob Sapp and Shinichi Suzukawa held under super-heavyweight “IGF rules” was scheduled for the event. The fight was set to feature a rule set similar to MMA, but with no closed fist strikes. However, the fight was canceled due to Sapp attempting to re-negotiate his contract backstage prior to the event and eventually electing to withdraw from the contest.

== Results ==
DREAM Rules
Weight class				Method	Round	Time	Notes
Featherweight	Hiroyuki Takaya	def.	Bibiano Fernandes (c)	Decision (unanimous)	3	5:00	(Note: For the Dream Featherweight Championship.)
Lightweight	Tatsuya Kawajiri	def.	Josh Thomson	Decision (unanimous)	3	5:00
Welterweight	Jason High	def.	Hayato Sakurai	Decision (split)	3	5:00
Welterweight	Marius Zaromskis	def.	Kazushi Sakuraba	TKO (doctor stoppage)	1	2:16	(Note: For the Dream Welterweight Championship.)
Heavyweight	Satoshi Ishii	def.	Jerome Le Banner	Decision (unanimous)	3	5:00
Heavyweight	Alistair Overeem	def.	Todd Duffee	KO (punches)	1	0:19	(Note: For the Dream Heavyweight Championship.)
Heavyweight	Sergei Kharitonov	def.	Tatsuya Mizuno	KO (knee)	1	1:25
Openweight	Hiroshi Izumi	def.	Ikuhisa Minowa	TKO (punches)	3	2:50
Featherweight	Hideo Tokoro	def.	Kazuhisa Watanabe	Submission (armbar)	3	2:50
Featherweight	Kazuyuki Miyata	def.	Caol Uno	Decision (unanimous)	3	5:00
Welterweight	Andy Ologun	def.	Katsuaki Furuki	Decision (unanimous)	3	5:00
DREAM/K-1 Special Rules
	Yuichiro Nagashima	def.	Shinya Aoki	KO (flying knee and punches)	2	0:04
K-1 Rules
	Akiyo Nishiura	vs.	Tetsuya Yamato	Majority Draw (30–30, 30–30, 29–30)	3	5:00
	Gegard Mousasi	def.	Kyotaro	Decision (30–28, 29–28, 29–28)	3	5:00

== See also ==
- Dream (mixed martial arts)
- List of Dream champions
- 2010 in DREAM
