= MFC 31 =

Maximum Fighting Championship MMA event in 2011

MFC 31: Rundown
- Promotion: Maximum Fighting Championship
- Date: October 7, 2011
- Venue: Mayfield Inn Trade and Conference Centre
- City: Edmonton, Alberta

Event chronology
MFC 30: Up Close and Personal	MFC 31: Rundown	MFC 32: Bitter Rivals

MFC 31: Rundown was a mixed martial arts event held by the Maximum Fighting Championship (MFC) on October 7, 2011 at the Mayfield Inn Trade and Conference Centre in Edmonton, Alberta. The event was broadcast live on HDNet.

== Background ==
Antonio McKee and Brian Cobb were expected to fight for the MFC Lightweight Championship on this card. However, that bout was moved to MFC 32.

This event used a half-point scoring system.

== Results ==
Main Card:

- MFC Light Heavyweight Championship bout: (Canada) Ryan Jimmo vs. (Cameroon) Rameau Thierry Sokoudjou

Jimmo defeated Sokoudjou via unanimous decision (49–48, 49–48, 49–48).

- Lightweight bout: (Canada) Kajan Johnson vs. (United States) Richie Whitso]

Johnson defeated Whitson via submission (rear naked choke) at 3:52 of round 1.

- Lightweight bout: (United States) Adam Lynn vs. (Canada) Curtis Demarce

Lynn defeated Demarce via KO (elbow) at 1:38 of round 1.

- Lightweight bout: (Canada) Sabah Fadai vs. (Zimbabwe) Mukai Maromo

Maromo defeated Fadai via unanimous decision (30–27, 30–27, 30–27).

- Middleweight bout: (Canada) Allen Hope vs. (United States) Terry Martin

Martin defeated Hope via TKO (punches and elbows) at 2:13 of round 1.

- Catchweight (175 lb.) bout: (Canada) Ryan Chiappe vs. (Canada) Cody Krahn

Krahn defeated Chiappe via submission (guillotine choke) at 3:45 of round 1.

Preliminary Card:

- Catchweight (175 lb.) bout: (Canada) Mike Froese vs. (Canada) Dajan Kajic

Froese and Kajic ended in a No Contest at 0:31 of round 1 after Froese was poked in the eye.

- Lightweight bout: (Canada) Garret Nybakken vs. (Canada) James Haddad

Haddad defeated Nybakken via submission (guillotine choke) at 4:12 of round 1.

- Lightweight bout: (Canada) Neal Anderson vs. (Canada) Dan Ring

Ring defeated Anderson via unanimous decision.
