= Bibiano Fernandes =

Brazilian-Canadian mixed martial artist

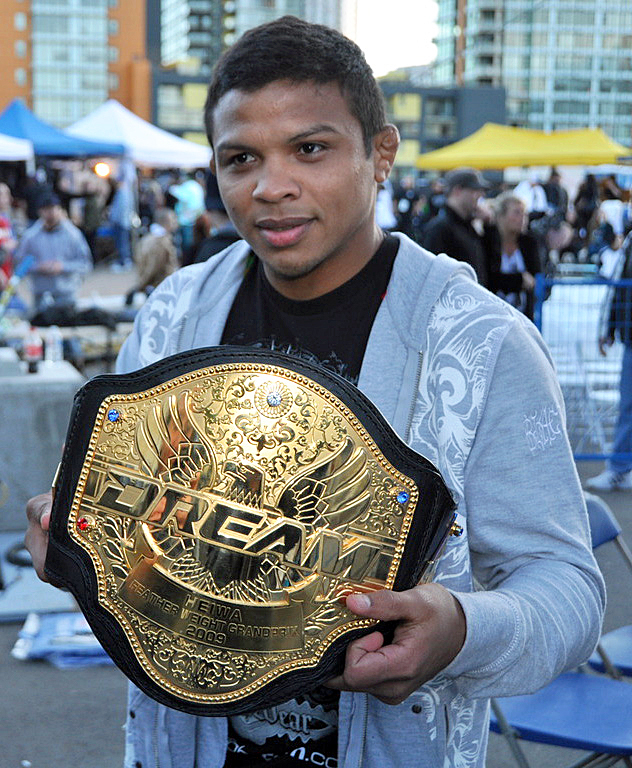
- Fernandes with his DREAM Featherweight Grand Prix championship belt, 2010
- Born: Bibiano Fernandes da Silva Neto; March 30, 1980 (age 46); Manaus, Amazonas, Brazil
- Other names: The Flash
- Nationality: Brazilian & Canadian
- Height: 5 ft 7 in (1.70 m)
- Weight: 145 lb (66 kg; 10.4 st)
- Division: Bantamweight; Featherweight
- Reach: 67.5 in (171 cm)
- Style: Brazilian Jiu-Jitsu, Pankration
- Fighting out of: Langley, Canada
- Team: Flash Academy BJJ, in Canadá
- Trainer: Faustino Neto, Osvaldo Alves
- Rank: 1st degree black belt in Brazilian Jiu-Jitsu under Oswaldo Alves
- Years active: 2004–2025

Mixed martial arts record
- Total: 31
- Wins: 25
- By knockout: 2
- By submission: 9
- By decision: 13
- By disqualification: 1
- Losses: 6
- By knockout: 2
- By decision: 4

Other information
- Mixed martial arts record from Sherdog

Bibiano Fernandes da Silva Neto (born March 30, 1980) is a Brazilian-Canadian former professional mixed martial artist and black belt Brazilian jiu-jitsu (BJJ) practitioner. A professional from 2004 to 2025, he most notably competed in the Bantamweight division of ONE Championship, where he was the two-time and longest reigning ONE Bantamweight MMA World Champion, along with being the interim ONE FC Bantamweight Champion in 2013. He formerly competed in the Bantamweight and Featherweight divisions of DREAM, where he was the inaugural and last DREAM Bantamweight Champion, and the inaugural DREAM Featherweight Champion. He also won the DREAM 2009 Featherweight Grand Prix, and the DREAM 2011 Bantamweight World Grand Prix. Bibiano was the company’s second two-weight champion.

A five time World jiu-jitsu champion (Note: in black and coloured belts) and three time Pan American champion, Fernandes was considered the top light-featherweight of his generation before transitioning to mixed martial arts (MMA). He previously competed for K-1, DREAM, and King of the Cage. He was once ranked as the #5 bantamweight in the world by MMA Weekly.

== Background ==
Fernandes was born in Manaus and grew up in a neighborhood called Coroado with his family. Fernandes played soccer throughout his childhood. Bibiano Fernandes' mother fell ill and eventually died when he was seven years old. His father, Inacio, didn't want to raise the children, so Bibiano and his siblings were sent to live with their aunt in the Amazon rainforest, by the Ituxi River. However, Bibiano caught malaria during their stay in the rainforest and his father was alerted to bring him back to Manaus for treatment. After returning to Manaus, Fernandes attended school for the first time in his life at the age of nine.

== Mixed martial arts career ==
At the age of 13, Bibiano was introduced to BJJ, but coming from a poor family he was unable to pay for training. His instructor said he'd continue to train him, as long as he cleaned the gym after the class. This gave Bibiano a profound respect and gratitude for the gym and what it taught. Bibiano says that he'd say to himself when he was a child: "Good job! You held your ground and believed what you believed."

=== Early career ===
Fernandes fought against world-class competition early in his MMA career. In his second professional fight, Fernandes lost due to a doctor's stoppage to Urijah Faber in a King of the Cage event in Nevada. After dominating the first 2 minutes of the round, even taking Faber's back, he was reversed and received a barrage of elbows that opened up a deep cut on his forehead. Though the fight was officially ruled a doctor stoppage, it was actually stopped by the referee, due to the cut. In his very next fight, Fernandes lost to Norifumi "Kid" Yamamoto at a K-1 Hero's event in Japan. After losing to Faber and Yamamoto, Fernandes won four consecutive fights before entering into the DREAM Featherweight Grand Prix.

=== DREAM ===
Bibiano defeated Joe Warren and Hiroyuki Takaya at DREAM 11 to win the DREAM Featherweight Grand Prix and become the first DREAM Featherweight Champion. After defeating Warren by first round armbar, Fernandes' fight against Takaya was very close, and he won by split decision.

Fernandes fought former DREAM Lightweight Champion Joachim Hansen on March 22, 2010, at DREAM 13 for his first title defense. He won the match in a split decision. At K-1 Dynamite!! 2010, Fernandes had a rematch with Takaya for the DREAM featherweight championship. Fernandes lost his title to Takaya via unanimous decision.

Fernandes next faced Takafumi Otsuka at DREAM 17 in the quarterfinals of the bantamweight tournament. He won the fight via submission in the first round. At Fight For Japan: Genki Desu Ka Omisoka 2011, he defeated Rodolfo Marques via unanimous decision in the semifinal round. In the finals, Fernandes defeated Antonio Banuelos via TKO in the first round to win the Dream World Bantamweight Grand Prix and become the first ever DREAM Bantamweight champion.

=== Ultimate Fighting Championship ===
On June 4, 2012, it was announced that Fernandes had signed with the UFC and was briefly linked to a bout against Roland Delorme on July 21, 2012, at UFC 149. However, the UFC claimed Fernandes pulled out of the bout, citing an injury. Bibiano subsequently clarified that he had been in negotiations with the UFC, but a contract was never signed.

=== ONE Championship ===
In June 2012 it was announced that Fernandes had signed with ONE Championship instead of the UFC.

Fernandes made his debut for the promotion at ONE FC 5 against Gustavo Falciroli. He won the fight via unanimous decision.

==== Interim ONE Bantamweight Championship ====
Fernandes next fight was at ONE FC 9: Rise to Power against Koetsu Okazaki for the Interim ONE Bantamweight Championship. He won via unanimous decision.

==== Undisputed ONE Bantamweight Championship ====
Fernandes next fought at ONE FC 11: Total Domination against Soo Chul Kim to unify the ONE Bantamweight Championship. He won the bout via unanimous decision and became the undisputed champion.

Fernandes headlined ONE Fighting Championship: Rise of Heroes on May 2, 2014, against Masakatsu Ueda. He won via unanimous decision.

Bibiano faced Dae Hwan Kim at ONE Fighting Championship: Warrior's Way on December 5, 2014, once again successfully defending his world title by defeating Kim via rear-naked choke in the second round.

In his fourth title defense, Fernandes faced Kevin Belingon at ONE Championship: Dynasty of Champions on January 23, 2016. He successfully defended his title, winning by kimura submission in the first round.

In his fifth title defense, Fernandes faced Reece McLaren at ONE Championship: Age of Domination on December 2, 2016. He won the fight by split decision.

On February 17, 2017, it was announced that Fernandes re-signed with ONE Championship.

==== Title loss and second reign ====
Fernandes fought Kevin Belingon for the second time at ONE Championship 78: Heart of the Lion on November 9, 2018, in a title unification bout. He lost the fight via split decision.

Fernandes faced Belingon in a trilogy match at ONE Championship: A New Era on March 30, 2019. He won the bout via disqualification when he could not continue after Belingon landed an illegal elbow to the back of Fernandes's head, once again regaining the bantamweight title.

Fernandes faced Belingon for the fourth time at ONE Championship: Century on October 13, 2019. He won the fight via a rear-naked choke submission in the second round.

Fernandes was scheduled to face John Lineker at ONE: X on December 3, 2021. However due to the pandemic, the event was postponed and the bout was moved to ONE: Bad Blood on February 11, 2022. Lineker tested positive for COVID days before the event and the bout was pulled. The bout was rescheduled for ONE: Lights Out on March 11, 2022. Fernandes lost the title by second-round knockout.

Fernandes faced Stephen Loman on November 19, 2022, at ONE on Prime Video 4. At weigh-ins, the pair failed to make weight in the bantamweight division and agreed to compete in the 153.25 lbs catchweight. He lost the fight via unanimous decision.

==== Parting ways with ONE, retirement, and Hall Of Fame induction ====
On December 23, 2023, Fernandes announced that he was no longer under contract with ONE, also warning fighters to ‘think twice before you decide to go there’.

Fernandes faced Kevin Belingon on February 20, 2025, at ONE 171. Fernandes won the bout via split decision and announced his retirement from competition after the bout.

After Bibiano’s retirement at ONE 171, it was announced on February 21, the day after his retirement, that he was going to be the second inductee to the ONE Hall of Fame. On March 23, 2025, the day when ONE 171 went on air, Bibiano was inducted into the ONE Hall of Fame by Chatri Sityodtong, the co-founder, chairman, and CEO of ONE Championship.

== Grappling career ==
Fernandes is a three-time IBJJF World Champion and three-time IBJJF Pan Champion.

Fernandes returned to Brazilian jiu-jitsu competition at the IBJJF Pan Championship 2024, in the Master 3 featherweight division. He won a gold medal.

Fernandes faced Urijah Faber in the main event of ADXC 5 on August 3, 2024. He lost the match by decision.

Also, he is an instructor of Brazilian Jiu-Jitsu, training and teaching former UFC Flyweight Champion, former ONE Flyweight World Champion, and ONE Flyweight World Grand Prix Champion, Demetrious Johnson, who is a black belt under Fernandes and Yan McCane, a Brazilian 3rd-degree BJJ instructor and practitioner. The pair awarded Demetrious his first-degree black belt, in April 2024.

== Personal life ==
Fernandes and his wife, Amanda, have three sons: Elijah, Gabriel and Lucas.

== Brazilian jiu-jitsu lineage ==
Mitsuyo "Count Koma" Maeda → Carlos Gracie, Sr. → Reyson Gracie → Osvaldo Alves → Faustino 'Pina' Neto → Bibiano Fernandes

== Championships and accomplishments ==
=== Mixed martial arts ===
- DREAM
  - DREAM Bantamweight Championship (One time; only)
  - DREAM 2011 Bantamweight World Grand Prix Champion
  - DREAM Featherweight Championship (One time; first)
    - One successful title defense
  - DREAM 2009 Featherweight World Grand Prix Champion
- ONE Championship
  - ONE Bantamweight Championship (Two times)
    - Seven successful title defenses (first reign)
    - One successful title defense (second reign)
  - Interim ONE Bantamweight Championship (One time)
  - Most title fights in ONE history (13)
  - Most title fight wins in ONE history (11)
  - Tied most consecutive title defenses in ONE history (seven, with Xiong Jing Nan and Nong-O Gaiyanghadao)
  - Most title defenses in ONE's bantamweight division (seven)
- Sherdog
  - 2011 All-Violence Second Team

=== Brazilian jiu-jitsu ===
- International Brazilian Jiu-Jitsu Federation
  - 2024 Pan American Jiu-Jitsu Championship Master 3 Featherweight Gold Medalist
  - 2007 Pan American Jiu-Jitsu Championship Black Belt Bronze Medalist
  - 2006 World Jiu-Jitsu Championship Black Belt Gold Medalist
  - 2006 Pan American Jiu-Jitsu Championship Black Belt Gold Medalist
  - 2005 World Jiu-Jitsu Championship Black Belt Gold Medalist
  - 2005 Pan American Jiu-Jitsu Championship Black Belt Gold Medalist
  - 2004 World Jiu-Jitsu Championship Black Belt Silver Medalist
  - 2004 Pan American Jiu-Jitsu Championship Black Belt Gold Medalist
  - 2003 World Jiu-Jitsu Championship Black Belt Gold Medalist
  - 2003 Brazil National Jiu-Jitsu Championship Black Belt Gold Medalist
  - 2002 World Jiu-Jitsu Championship Brown Belt Gold Medalist
  - 2002 Brazil National Jiu-Jitsu Championship Brown Belt Gold Medalist
  - 2001 Brazil National Jiu-Jitsu Championship Purple Belt Gold Medalist
  - 1998 World Jiu-Jitsu Championship Blue Belt Bronze Medalist
  - 1997 Brazil National Jiu-Jitsu Championship Blue Belt Gold Medalist

== Mixed martial arts record ==
Professional record breakdown
31 matches	25 wins	6 losses
By knockout	2	2
By submission	9	0
By decision	13	4
By disqualification	1	0

Res.	Record	Opponent	Method	Event	Date	Round	Time	Location	Notes
Win	25–6	Kevin Belingon	Decision (split)	ONE 171	February 20, 2025	3	5:00	Lusail, Qatar	
Loss	24–6	Stephen Loman	Decision (unanimous)	ONE on Prime Video 4	November 19, 2022	3	5:00	Kallang, Singapore	Catchweight (153.25 lb) bout; both fighters missed weight.
Loss	24–5	John Lineker	KO (punch)	ONE: Lights Out	March 11, 2022	2	3:40	Kallang, Singapore	Lost the ONE Bantamweight Championship (145 lb).
Win	24–4	Kevin Belingon	Submission (rear-naked choke)	ONE: Century – Part 2	October 13, 2019	2	2:16	Tokyo, Japan	Defended the ONE Bantamweight Championship (145 lb).
Win	23–4	Kevin Belingon	DQ (illegal elbows)	ONE: A New Era	March 31, 2019	3	3:40	Tokyo, Japan	Won the ONE Bantamweight Championship (145 lb). An illegal elbows to the back of the head rendered Fernandes unable to continue.
Loss	22–4	Kevin Belingon	Decision (split)	ONE: Heart of the Lion	November 9, 2018	5	5:00	Kallang, Singapore	Lost the ONE Bantamweight Championship (145 lb.)
Win	22–3	Martin Nguyen	Decision (split)	ONE: Iron Will	March 24, 2018	5	5:00	Bangkok, Thailand	Defended the ONE Bantamweight Championship (145 lb.)
Win	21–3	Andrew Leone	Submission (rear-naked choke)	ONE: Kings & Conquerors	August 5, 2017	1	1:47	Macau, SAR, China	Defended the ONE Bantamweight Championship.
Win	20–3	Reece McLaren	Decision (split)	ONE: Age of Domination	December 2, 2016	5	5:00	Pasay, Philippines	Defended the ONE Bantamweight Championship.
Win	19–3	Kevin Belingon	Submission (kimura)	ONE: Dynasty of Champions	January 23, 2016	1	4:04	Changsha, China	Defended the ONE Bantamweight Championship.
Win	18–3	Toni Tauru	KO (punch)	ONE: Kingdom of Warriors	July 18, 2015	3	1:02	Yangon, Myanmar	Defended the ONE Bantamweight Championship.
Win	17–3	Kim Dae-hwan	Submission (rear-naked choke)	ONE FC: Warrior's Way	December 5, 2014	2	1:16	Pasay, Philippines	Defended the ONE Bantamweight Championship.
Win	16–3	Masakatsu Ueda	Decision (unanimous)	ONE FC: Rise of Heroes	May 2, 2014	5	5:00	Pasay, Philippines	Defended the ONE Bantamweight Championship.
Win	15–3	Soo Chul Kim	Decision (unanimous)	ONE FC: Total Domination	October 18, 2013	5	5:00	Kallang, Singapore	Won and unified the ONE Bantamweight Championship.
Win	14–3	Koetsu Okazaki	Decision (unanimous)	ONE FC: Rise to Power	May 31, 2013	5	5:00	Pasay, Philippines	Won the interim ONE Bantamweight Championship.
Win	13–3	Yoshiro Maeda	Technical Submission (triangle choke)	Dream 18	December 31, 2012	1	1:46	Tokyo, Japan	Non-title bout.
Win	12–3	Gustavo Falciroli	Decision (unanimous)	ONE FC: Pride of a Nation	August 31, 2012	3	5:00	Quezon City, Philippines	
Win	11–3	Antonio Banuelos	TKO (punches)	Fight For Japan: Genki Desu Ka Omisoka 2011	December 31, 2011	1	1:21	Saitama, Japan	Won the 2011 DREAM Bantamweight Grand Prix and the inaugural DREAM Bantamweight Championship.
Win	10–3	Rodolfo Marques	Decision (unanimous)	Fight For Japan: Genki Desu Ka Omisoka 2011	December 31, 2011	2	5:00	Saitama, Japan	2011 DREAM Bantamweight Grand Prix Semifinal.
Win	9–3	Takafumi Otsuka	Technical Submission (rear-naked choke)	Dream 17	September 24, 2011	1	0:41	Saitama, Japan	Bantamweight debut. 2011 DREAM Bantamweight Grand Prix Quarterfinal.
Loss	8–3	Hiroyuki Takaya	Decision (unanimous)	Dynamite!! 2010	December 31, 2010	3	5:00	Saitama, Japan	Lost the DREAM Featherweight Championship.
Win	8–2	Joachim Hansen	Decision (split)	Dream 13	March 22, 2010	2	5:00	Yokohama, Japan	Defended the DREAM Featherweight Championship.
Win	7–2	Hiroyuki Takaya	Decision (split)	Dream 11	October 6, 2009	2	5:00	Yokohama, Japan	2009 DREAM Featherweight Grand Prix and the inaugural DREAM Featherweight Championship.
Win	6–2	Joe Warren	Submission (armbar)	Dream 11	October 6, 2009	1	0:42	Yokohama, Japan	2009 DREAM Featherweight Grand Prix Semifinal.
Win	5–2	Masakazu Imanari	Decision (unanimous)	Dream 9	May 26, 2009	2	5:00	Yokohama, Japan	2009 DREAM Featherweight Grand Prix Quarterfinal.
Win	4–2	Takafumi Otsuka	Decision (unanimous)	Dream 7	March 8, 2009	2	5:00	Saitama, Japan	Return to Featherweight. 2009 DREAM Featherweight Grand Prix Opening Round.
Win	3–2	Len Tam	Submission (triangle choke)	Raw Combat: Redemption	October 25, 2008	1	0:58	Calgary, Alberta, Canada	
Win	2–2	Juan Barrantes	Decision (unanimous)	Raw Combat: Resurrection	June 20, 2008	3	5:00	Calgary, Alberta, Canada	
Loss	1–2	Norifumi Yamamoto	Decision (unanimous)	Hero's 10	September 17, 2007	3	5:00	Kanagawa, Japan	Lightweight debut.
Loss	1–1	Urijah Faber	TKO (punches)	KOTC: All Stars	October 28, 2006	1	4:16	Reno, Nevada, United States	For the KOTC Bantamweight Championship (145 lb).
Win	1–0	Luis Figueroa	Submission (rear-naked choke)	Jungle Fight 3	October 23, 2004	1	0:31	Manaus, Brazil	Featherweight debut.

== See also ==
- List of current mixed martial arts champions
- List of male mixed martial artists
- List of multi-sport athletes
- List of multi-sport champions

== Notes ==
New championship	1st Dream Featherweight Champion; October 6, 2009 - December 31, 2010	Succeeded by Hiroyuki Takaya
New championship	1st Dream Bantamweight Champion; December 31, 2011 - Present	
