= Hiroyuki Takaya =

Japanese martial artist

- Born: June 10, 1977 (age 49); Narashino, Chiba, Japan
- Other names: Streetfight Bancho
- Nationality: Japanese
- Height: 5 ft 6 in (1.68 m)
- Weight: 145.4 lb (66 kg; 10 st 5 lb)
- Division: Featherweight; Lightweight
- Style: Kickboxing
- Team: Wajyutsu Keisyukai; Takaya Gundan
- Years active: 2003 - present

Kickboxing record
- Total: 3
- Losses: 3

Mixed martial arts record
- Total: 39
- Wins: 23
- By knockout: 15
- By decision: 8
- Losses: 14
- By knockout: 5
- By submission: 1
- By decision: 8
- Draws: 2

Other information
- Mixed martial arts record from Sherdog
- Last updated on: April 20, 2013

Hiroyuki Takaya (Japanese: 高谷裕之, Takaya Hiroyuki, born June 10, 1977) is a Japanese mixed martial artist currently competing in the Featherweight division. A professional competitor since 2003, Takaya has fought in the WEC, Strikeforce, DREAM, Shooto, K-1 HERO'S, Pancrase, RIZIN, Vale Tudo Japan, and Cage Force. Takaya is the former DREAM Featherweight Champion. He also competed at the Japanese MMA events Fight For Japan: Genki Desu Ka Omisoka 2011 and Dynamite!! 2010. Due to his experience in street fighting, Takaya is known as the "Streetfight Bancho".

== Mixed martial arts career ==
Takaya made his professional debut in the Shooto organization in a fight against Hayate Usul in 2003. After a 9-4-1 record in Shooto, Hero's, and Cage Force including bouts against top mixed martial artists like current Strikeforce Lightweight Champion Gilbert Melendez, Hero's Lightweight runner up Genki Sudo, and former Hero's Middleweight Champion Gesias Calvancante Takaya made his American debut at WEC 32 where he fought, and lost to, Leonard Garcia by knockout. Takaya then lost to Cub Swanson at WEC 37 losing by Unanimous Decision but won fight of the night honours.

=== DREAM ===
Takaya was a participant in the DREAM Featherweight Grand Prix. Takaya beat Jong Won Kim, Yoshiro Maeda and Hideo Tokoro en route to the finals, before losing to Bibiano Fernandes via split decision become the runner up of the tournament.

Takaya scored perhaps the biggest win of his career over former DREAM Lightweight Champion Joachim Hansen on May 29, 2010 at DREAM.14 with 28 seconds left in the first round. It was the first knockout defeat in the 10½-year career of Hansen.

On December 31, 2010, Takaya defeated Bibiano Fernandes via unanimous decision and became the DREAM Featherweight Champion.

He fought at Dream: Japan GP Final against Kazuyuki Miyata and successfully defended the DREAM Featherweight Championship.

Takaya defended his title on December 31, 2011 at Fight For Japan: Genki Desu Ka Omisoka 2011, defeating Takeshi Inoue via unanimous decision.

=== Strikeforce ===
Takaya fought on April 9, 2011 at Strikeforce: Diaz vs. Daley. He lost his fight against Robbie Peralta via split decision.

=== Rizin Fighting Federation ===
In his debut for the Rizin Fighting Federation, Takaya faced Daiki Hata on December 29, 2015. He won the fight via unanimous decision.

== Kickboxing ==
He lost to Hiroki Shishido by unanimous decision after being knocked down twice in round one at Shootboxing 2013: Act 2 in Tokyo on April 20, 2013.

== Personal life ==
Takaya is married to Japanese fashion model Maho Miura.

== Championships and accomplishments ==
- DREAM
  - DREAM Featherweight Championship (One time, last)
  - 2009 DREAM Featherweight Grand Prix Runner-Up
- K-1 HERO'S
  - 2005 K-1 HERO'S Middleweight Grand Prix Semifinalist
- Shooto
  - 2003 Shoot Lightweight Rookie Tournament Winner
- World Extreme Cagefighting
  - Fight of the Night (One time)

== Mixed martial arts record ==
Professional record breakdown
39 matches	23 wins	14 losses
By knockout	15	5
By submission	0	1
By decision	8	8
Draws	2	

Res.	Record	Opponent	Method	Event	Date	Round	Time	Location	Notes
Win	23–14–2	Baataryn Azjavkhlan	Decision (unanimous)	Rizin World Grand Prix 2017: 2nd Round	December 29, 2017	3	5:00	Saitama Super Arena, Saitama, Japan	
Win	22–14–2	Hatsu Hioki	KO (punches)	Pancrase 290	October 8, 2017	1	1:12	Tokyo, Japan	
Loss	21–14–1	Isao Kobayashi	Decision (unanimous)	Pancrase 283	December 18, 2016	3	5:00	Tokyo, Japan	
Loss	21–13–1	Alan Omer	Decision (unanimous)	Euro FC 1: The New Era	October 1, 2016	3	5:00	Espoo, Finland	
Loss	21–12–1	Nazareno Malegarie	Decision (unanimous)	Pancrase 278	June 12, 2016	3	5:00	Tokyo, Japan	
Win	21–11–2	Daiki Hata	Decision (unanimous)	Rizin Fighting Federation 1: Day 1	December 29, 2015	3	5:00	Saitama, Japan	
Win	20–11–2	Guy Delumeau	TKO (punches)	Pancrase 266	April 26, 2015	3	4:11	Tokyo, Japan	
Win	19–11–2	Ryogo Takahashi	KO (punches)	Vale Tudo Japan: VTJ 6th	October 4, 2014	2	0:38	Tokyo, Japan	
Win	18–11–2	Yojiro Uchimara	TKO (punches)	Vale Tudo Japan: VTJ 4th	February 23, 2014	1	1:27	Tokyo, Japan	
Draw	17–11–2	Toby Imada	Draw (majority)	Shoot Boxing: Ground Zero Tokyo 2013	November 16, 2013	3	5:00	Tokyo, Japan	
Loss	17–11–1	Daniel Romero	TKO (punches)	Vale Tudo Japan: VTJ 2nd	June 22, 2013	1	3:21	Tokyo, Japan	
Loss	17–10–1	Georgi Karakhanyan	Decision (split)	DREAM 18	December 31, 2012	3	5:00	Tokyo, Japan	Non-title bout.
Win	17–9–1	Takeshi Inoue	Decision (unanimous)	Fight For Japan: Genki Desu Ka Omisoka 2011	December 31, 2011	5	5:00	Tokyo, Japan, Japan	Defended DREAM Featherweight Championship.
Win	16–9–1	Kazuyuki Miyata	Decision (split)	DREAM: Japan GP Final	July 16, 2011	3	5:00	Tokyo, Japan, Japan	Defended DREAM Featherweight Championship.
Loss	15–9–1	Robbie Peralta	Decision (split)	Strikeforce: Diaz vs. Daley	April 9, 2011	3	5:00	San Diego, California, United States	
Win	15–8–1	Bibiano Fernandes	Decision (unanimous)	Dynamite!! 2010	December 31, 2010	3	5:00	Saitama, Japan	Won DREAM Featherweight Championship.
Win	14–8–1	Chase Beebe	KO (punches)	DREAM 16	September 25, 2010	1	1:45	Nagoya, Japan	
Win	13–8–1	Joachim Hansen	KO (punches)	DREAM 14	May 29, 2010	1	4:32	Saitama, Japan	
Loss	12–8–1	Michihiro Omigawa	TKO (punches)	Dynamite!! The Power of Courage 2009	December 31, 2009	1	2:54	Saitama, Japan	
Loss	12–7–1	Bibiano Fernandes	Decision (split)	DREAM 11	September 6, 2009	2	5:00	Yokohama, Japan	DREAM Featherweight Grand Prix Final.
Win	12–6–1	Hideo Tokoro	TKO (punches)	DREAM 11	September 6, 2009	2	0:32	Yokohama, Japan	DREAM Featherweight Grand Prix Semifinal.
Win	11–6–1	Yoshiro Maeda	TKO (punches)	DREAM 9	May 26, 2009	1	9:39	Yokohama, Japan	DREAM Featherweight Grand Prix Quarterfinal.
Win	10–6–1	Jong Won Kim	TKO (punches)	DREAM 7	March 8, 2009	2	0:40	Saitama, Saitama, Japan	DREAM Featherweight Grand Prix Opening Round.
Loss	9–6–1	Cub Swanson	Decision (unanimous)	WEC 37	December 3, 2008	3	5:00	Las Vegas, Nevada, United States	Won Fight of the Night.
Loss	9–5–1	Leonard Garcia	KO (punch)	WEC 32	February 13, 2008	1	1:31	Rio Rancho, New Mexico, United States	
Win	9–4–1	Antonio Carvalho	TKO (knees and punches)	Shooto: Back To Our Roots 6	November 8, 2007	3	1:58	Tokyo, Japan	
Win	8–4–1	Jarrod Card	KO (punch)	GCM: Cage Force 4	September 8, 2007	1	3:02	Tokyo, Japan	Return to Featherweight.
Loss	7–4–1	Andre Amade	TKO (broken nose)	HERO'S 8	March 12, 2007	1	3:29	Nagoya, Japan	
Loss	7–3–1	Gesias Cavalcante	KO (flying knee)	HERO'S 6	August 5, 2006	1	0:30	Tokyo, Japan	Hero's 2006 Middleweight Grand Prix Quarterfinal.
Win	7–2–1	Do Hyung Kim	Decision (unanimous)	HERO'S 2005 in Seoul	November 5, 2005	2	5:00	Seoul, South Korea	
Loss	6–2–1	Genki Sudo	Submission (triangle choke)	HERO'S 3	September 7, 2005	2	3:47	Tokyo, Japan	K-1 HERO'S 2005 Middleweight Grand Prix Semifinal.
Win	6–1–1	Remigijus Morkevicius	TKO (punches)	HERO'S 3	September 7, 2005	2	4:16	Tokyo, Japan	K-1 HERO'S 2005 Middleweight Grand Prix Quarterfinal.
Win	5–1–1	Jani Lax	TKO (punch)	HERO'S 2	July 6, 2005	1	1:56	Tokyo, Japan	Moves up to Lightweight.
Loss	4–1–1	Gilbert Melendez	Decision (unanimous)	Shooto: Year End Show 2004	December 14, 2004	3	5:00	Tokyo, Japan	
Win	4–0–1	Stephen Palling	KO (head kick)	Shooto 2004: 5/3 in Korakuen Hall	May 3, 2004	1	2:11	Tokyo, Japan	
Draw	3–0–1	João Roque	Draw	Shooto 2004: 1/24 in Korakuen Hall	January 24, 2004	3	5:00	Tokyo, Japan	
Win	3–0	Seigi Fujioka	Decision (unanimous)	Shooto: Wanna Shooto 2003	November 3, 2003	2	5:00	Tokyo, Japan	
Win	2–0	Hatsu Hioki	Decision (unanimous)	Shooto: 7/13 in Korakuen Hall	July 13, 2003	2	5:00	Tokyo, Japan	
Win	1–0	Hayate Usui	TKO (punches)	Shooto: 2/6 in Kitazawa Town Hall	February 6, 2003	2	2:06	Tokyo, Japan	

== Kickboxing record ==
Kickboxing record
0 wins, 3 losses
Date	Result	Opponent	Event	Location	Method	Round	Time	Record	Notes
April 20, 2013	Loss	(Japan) Hiroki Shishido	Shootboxing 2013: Act 2	Tokyo, Japan	Decision (unanimous)			0-3	
September 23, 2004	Loss	(Japan) Yuya Yamamoto	AJKF: "Danger Zone"	Tokyo, Japan	Decision (unanimous)	3	3:00	0-2	
March 13, 2004	Loss	(Japan) Satoruvashicoba	AJKF: "Strongest Tournament 2004 All Japan Lightweight 1st Stage"	Japan	Decision (unanimous)	3	3:00	0-1	Lightweight Tournament opening round.
Legend: Win Loss Draw/No contest

== Notes and references ==
Preceded by Bibiano Fernandes	2nd DREAM Featherweight Champion; December 31, 2010 – present	Current holder
