= Sokoudjou =

Cameroonian mixed martial arts fighter

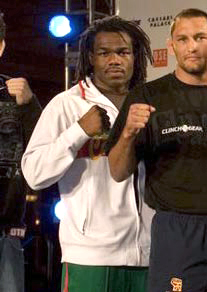
- Sokoudjou in 2007
- Born: Rameau Thierry Sokoudjou Nkamhoua; April 18, 1984 (age 42); Hom'la, Cameroon
- Other names: The African Assassin
- Nationality: French; American
- Height: 5 ft 10 in (1.78 m)
- Weight: 205 lb (93 kg; 14 st 9 lb)
- Division: Super Heavyweight; Heavyweight; Light Heavyweight
- Reach: 78 in (198 cm)
- Fighting out of: Oceanside, California, United States
- Team: Team Quest; MMA Factory
- Rank: Second dan black belt in Judo; Purple belt in Brazilian Jiu-Jitsu
- Years active: 2006–2017

Kickboxing record
- Total: 2
- Losses: 2

Mixed martial arts record
- Total: 37
- Wins: 19
- By knockout: 13
- By submission: 1
- By decision: 4
- By disqualification: 1
- Losses: 18
- By knockout: 13
- By submission: 2
- By decision: 3

Amateur Muay Thai record
- Total: 5
- Wins: 4
- Losses: 1

Other information
- Mixed martial arts record from Sherdog
- Last updated on: February 23, 2013

Rameau Thierry Sokoudjou Nkamhoua (French pronunciation: [ʁamo tjɛʁi sɔkudʒu]; born April 18, 1984), mostly billed simply as Sokoudjou, is a Cameroonian-born French and American former professional mixed martial artist. A professional competitor from 2006 to 2017, Sokoudjou is the former KSW Light Heavyweight Champion, and has also competed for PRIDE, the UFC, WEC, Affliction, Strikeforce, K-1, DREAM and Bellator.

== Background ==
Born and raised in Cameroon, Sokoudjou began training in judo at the age of five and was talented, winning three consecutive junior national championships from 1997 to 1999 in his home country. Growing up, he had actually wanted to get involved with boxing or kickboxing but his parents would not allow it because they thought the competition was too violent. Sokoudjou moved to the United States in 2001 to pursue his career in judo.

== Mixed martial arts career ==
=== PRIDE Fighting Championships ===
In his PRIDE debut at PRIDE 33, Sokoudjou fought Brazilian fighter Antônio Rogério Nogueira, and the much-less experienced Sokoudjou was a 16-1 underdog. To start the match, the Cameroonian threw a series of high kicks before landing an excellent combination that knocked out "Lil Nog" at just 23 seconds into the first round in a shocking upset. This made Sokoudjou the first fighter to finish the younger Nogueira brother. Sokoudjou's victory is considered to be one of the biggest upsets in mixed martial arts history, as well as arguably the biggest win of Sokoudjou's career to date.

=== Ultimate Fighting Championship ===
Sokoudjou was released from the UFC on November 28, 2008.

=== Independent Promotions ===
Sokoudjou defeated the South-African kickboxer Jan Nortje at Dream 9 by TKO (strikes) in round 1 of the Dream Super Hulk Tournament. Sokoudjou was heavily criticized for his post-fight actions where he landed a barrage of extra punches after the referee had already stepped in to stop the fight. Sokoudjou did, however, express remorse for his actions, and apologized to Nortje for the incident. Sokoudjou was slated to face Gegard Mousasi in the semifinals at Dream 11, however, due to an injury, Super heavyweight Bob Sapp stood in for Mousasi.

Sokoudjou fought Ryan Jimmo for the MFC Light Heavyweight Championship at MFC 31 on October 7 at the Mayfield Conference Centre in Edmonton, Canada, losing by a controversial unanimous decision.

Sokoudjou fought Heavyweight prospect Konstantin Erokhin at Fight Nights: Battle Of Moscow 14, on December 7, 2013. He lost via KO in the first round.

=== Strikeforce ===
Sokoudjou was defeated by former Strikeforce Light Heavyweight Champion Gegard Mousasi via second-round TKO due to ground and pound on November 7, 2009, at Strikeforce: Fedor vs. Rogers.

=== KSW and others ===
Sokoudjou faced European prospect Jan Błachowicz at KSW XV for the KSW Light Heavyweight Championship, After two rounds Sokoudjou landed 12 leg kicks, making Błachowicz unable to continue the fight.

=== Bellator MMA ===
In June 2015, it was revealed that Sokoudjou was released from the promotion.

== Kickboxing career ==
Sokoudjou faced Maxim Grishin in a kickboxing match on February 23, 2013, at Fight Nights 10 in Moscow, Russia. He lost via split decision(29–28, 28–29, 28–29).

== Personal life ==
Sokoudjou speaks French, as well as a few dialects in his home country of Cameroon. He currently lives in Southern California and has a brother. Before becoming a professional mixed martial arts fighter, Sokoudjou worked as a bouncer.

== Championships and accomplishments ==
=== Mixed martial arts ===
- ADFC
  - 2010 ADFC Openweight Grand Prix Semifinalist
- DREAM
  - DREAM Super Hulk Grand Prix Runner-Up
- Konfrontacja Sztuk Walki
  - KSW Light Heavyweight Championship (One time)
  - Fight of the Night (One Time)
- Shark Fights
  - Fight of the Night (One Time)
- Australian Fighting Championship
  - AFC Light Heavyweight Championship (One time, current)

== Mixed martial arts record ==
Professional record breakdown
37 matches	19 wins	18 losses
By knockout	13	13
By submission	1	2
By decision	4	3
By disqualification	1	0

Res.	Record	Opponent	Method	Event	Date	Round	Time	Location	Notes
Win	19–18	Jamie Abdullah	TKO (punches)	AFC / Kunlun Fight - Kunlun Fight MMA 16	October 28, 2017	2	2:42	Melbourne, Australia	Won the AFC Light Heavyweight Championship.
Loss	18–18	Sergei Kharitonov	KO (punch)	M-1 Challenge 80: Kharitonov vs. Sokoudjou	June 15, 2017	1	0:40	Harbin, China	Heavyweight bout.
Loss	18–17	Łukasz Jurkowski	Decision (majority)	KSW 39: Colosseum	May 27, 2017	3	5:00	Warsaw, Poland	
Win	18–16	Marcelo Tenorio	TKO (punches and elbows)	Australian FC 18: Night 1	April 14, 2017	1	N/A	Shanghai, China	
Loss	17–16	Thiago Silva	TKO (punches)	F2N: Fight2Night	November 4, 2016	3	2:37	Rio de Janeiro, Brazil	
Loss	17–15	Tomasz Narkun	TKO (punches)	KSW 36: Materla vs. Palhares	Oct 1, 2016	1	4:38	Zielona Góra, Poland	For the KSW Light Heavyweight Championship.
Win	17–14	Matt Hamill	KO (punches)	Venator FC 3: Palhares vs. Meek	May 21, 2016	1	0:37	Milan, Italy	
Loss	16–14	Paul Buentello	KO (punch)	Abu Dhabi Warriors 3	October 4, 2015	3	3:12	Abu Dhabi, United Arab Emirates	Heavyweight bout.
Loss	16–13	Linton Vassell	TKO (punches)	Bellator 134	February 27, 2015	2	3:18	Uncasville, Connecticut, United States	
Win	16–12	Malik Merad	TKO (elbows)	Bellator 127	October 3, 2014	2	4:04	Temecula, California, United States	
Win	15–12	Terry Davinney	Submission (rear-naked choke)	Bellator 121	June 6, 2014	1	4:16	Thackerville, Oklahoma, United States	
Loss	14–12	Konstantin Erokhin	KO (punches)	Fight Nights: Battle of Moscow 14	December 7, 2013	1	2:28	Moscow, Russia	Heavyweight bout.
Loss	14–11	Evgeny Erokhin	TKO (punches and elbows)	Pankration: Mayor Cup 2013	May 25, 2013	3	4:40	Khabarovsk, Russia	Heavyweight bout.
Win	14–10	Seung Bae Whi	Decision (unanimous)	Road FC 011	April 13, 2013	3	5:00	Seoul, South Korea	
Win	13–10	Denis Komkin	KO (head kick)	Pankration: Battle Of Empires 2	December 15, 2012	1	1:00	Khabarovsk, Russia	Heavyweight bout.
Loss	12–10	Jan Błachowicz	Decision (unanimous)	KSW 17: Revenge	November 26, 2011	3	5:00	Łódź, Poland	Lost the KSW Light Heavyweight Championship. Fight of the Night.
Loss	12–9	Ryan Jimmo	Decision (unanimous)	MFC 31	October 7, 2011	5	5:00	Edmonton, Alberta, Canada	For MFC Light Heavyweight Championship.
Win	12–8	Roy Boughton	Decision (unanimous)	Score Fighting Series 1	June 10, 2011	3	5:00	Mississauga, Ontario, Canada	
Win	11–8	Jan Błachowicz	TKO (leg injury)	KSW 15: Contemporary Gladiators	March 19, 2011	2	5:00	Warsaw, Poland	Won the vacant KSW Light Heavyweight Championship.
Win	10–8	Valdas Pocevicius	Decision (unanimous)	Israel FC: Genesis	November 9, 2010	3	5:00	Tel Aviv, Israel	
Loss	9–8	Shamil Abdurakhimov	TKO (punches)	ADFC: Round 2	October 22, 2010	3	2:17	Abu Dhabi, United Arab Emirates	2010 Openweight Grand Prix Semifinal.
Loss	9–7	Houston Alexander	TKO (punches)	Shark Fights 13: Jardine vs Prangley	September 11, 2010	2	1:31	Amarillo, Texas, United States	Fight of the Night.
Win	9–6	Joaquim Ferreira	TKO (punches)	Impact FC 1	July 10, 2010	1	1:20	Brisbane, Australia	Return to Light Heavyweight.
Win	8–6	Dave Herman	DQ (illegal knees)	ADFC: Round 1	May 14, 2010	2	N/A	Abu Dhabi, United Arab Emirates	Heavyweight debut. 2010 Grand Prix Quarterfinal; Herman was DQ'd for kneeing Sokoudjou in the head while grounded.
Loss	7–6	Ikuhisa Minowa	TKO (punches)	Dynamite!! 2009	December 31, 2009	3	3:29	Saitama, Japan	DREAM Super Hulk Grand Prix Final.
Loss	7–5	Gegard Mousasi	TKO (punches)	Strikeforce: Fedor vs. Rogers	November 7, 2009	2	3:43	Hoffman Estates, Illinois, United States	Light Heavyweight bout.
Win	7–4	Bob Sapp	TKO (punches)	DREAM 11	October 6, 2009	1	1:31	Yokohama, Japan	DREAM Super Hulk Grand Prix Semifinal.
Win	6–4	Jan Nortje	TKO (punches)	DREAM 9	May 26, 2009	1	2:30	Yokohama, Japan	Super Heavyweight debut; DREAM Super Hulk Grand Prix Opening Round.
Loss	5–4	Renato Sobral	Submission (brabo choke)	Affliction: Day of Reckoning	January 24, 2009	2	2:38	Anaheim, California, United States	
Loss	5–3	Luiz Cané	TKO (punches)	UFC 89	October 18, 2008	2	4:15	Birmingham, England	
Win	5–2	Kazuhiro Nakamura	TKO (leg injury)	UFC 84	May 24, 2008	1	5:00	Las Vegas, Nevada, United States	
Loss	4–2	Lyoto Machida	Submission (arm-triangle choke)	UFC 79	December 29, 2007	2	4:20	Las Vegas, Nevada, United States	
Win	4–1	Ricardo Arona	KO (punches)	PRIDE 34	April 8, 2007	1	1:59	Saitama, Japan	
Win	3–1	Antônio Rogério Nogueira	KO (punch)	PRIDE 33	February 24, 2007	1	0:23	Las Vegas, Nevada, United States	
Loss	2–1	Glover Teixeira	KO (punches)	WEC 24: Full Force	October 12, 2006	1	1:41	Lemoore, California, United States	
Win	2–0	Paul Weremecki	TKO (head kick and punches)	SF 17: Hot Zone	August 5, 2006	1	2:11	Portland, Oregon, United States	
Win	1–0	Gary Padilla	Decision (split)	Total Combat 15	July 15, 2006	3	5:00	San Diego, California, United States	

== Kickboxing record ==
0 wins, 2 losses
Date	Result	Opponent	Event	Location	Method	Round	Time	Record
Loss	Maxim Grishin	Decision (split)	Fight Nights: Battle of Moscow 10	February 23, 2013	3	3:00	Moscow, Russia
Loss	Maxim Osipov	Decision (majority)	UWC 20	September 1, 2012	3	3:00	Southend-on-Sea, England

Legend: Win Loss Draw/No contest

== Bare-Knuckle Boxing ==
Professional record breakdown
1 match	0 wins	1 loss
By knockout	0	1
By decision	0	0
By disqualification	0	0
Draws	0	

Res.	Record	Opponent	Method	Event	Date	Round	Time	Location	Notes
Loss	0–1	Mighty Mo	TKO (punches)	VKB-Valor Bare Knuckle 1	21 September 2019	3	1:26	New Town, ND, USA, 4 Bears Casino and Lodge	Heavyweight Tournament Semi-Finals
