= Kazuyuki Miyata =

Japanese martial artist

- Born: Miyata Kazuyuki; 29 January 1976 (age 50); Ibaraki, Japan
- Native name: 宮田 和幸
- Other names: Little Hercules
- Nationality: Japanese
- Height: 5 ft 7 in (170 cm)
- Weight: 153.3 lb (69.5 kg; 10.95 st)
- Division: Featherweight; Lightweight
- Team: Brave

Kickboxing record
- Total: 3
- Wins: 1
- Losses: 2
- By knockout: 2

Mixed martial arts record
- Total: 25
- Wins: 16
- By knockout: 1
- By submission: 9
- By decision: 6
- Losses: 9
- By knockout: 1
- By submission: 6
- By decision: 2

Other information
- Mixed martial arts record from Sherdog

Kazuyuki Miyata ( Japanese: 宮田 和幸 Miyata Kazuyuki) is a retired Japanese mixed martial artist. A professional competitor since 2004, Miyata has competed for Rizin, DREAM, K-1 HERO'S, DEEP, RINGS, and made an appearance at K-1 PREMIUM 2007 Dynamite!!

== Background ==
Originally from the Ibaraki Prefecture of Japan, Miyata began wrestling from a young age and was talented. Miyata won national and regional championships during his middle school years and later high school years at Tsuchiuranichidai High School, where he befriended future professional mixed martial arts fighters, Hayato Sakurai and Michihiro Omigawa. Miyata continued his wrestling career at Nippon University where he was a collegiate champion in the 139 lbs. weight class in 1999.

=== Olympic career ===
Miyata competed in Freestyle Wrestling for Japan at the 2000 Summer Olympics in Sydney and was ranked 13th overall. He made it past the 1st round against Otar Tushishvili but lost the second round by decision to Carlos Ortíz. Miyata also finished 17th at the 2001 World Championship 69.0 kg division and 4th at the 2000 Asian Championship 63.0 kg division.

=== Mixed martial arts career ===
Miyata made his MMA debut at Rumble on the Rock 6 in 2004, against Royler Gracie where despite dominating the majority of the fight he was caught by submission due to a triangle choke in the second round. Miyata continued his career by fighting in the Japanese promotion, K-1 HERO'S where he held notable wins over Kultar Gill and Ian James Schaffa.

Miyata also fought in the Japanese promotion DEEP but returned to DREAM on October 6, 2009 where he faced Daiki Hata in a reserve bout for the Featherweight Grand Prix. Miyata defeated Hata via unanimous decision. Miyata then defeated Takafumi Otsuka at DREAM 14 by split decision and Takeshi Inoue at DREAM 16 by unanimous decision. He also walks around 71 kg at 7-8% body fat.

== Mixed martial arts record ==
Professional record breakdown
| 25 matches | 16 wins | 9 losses |
| By knockout | 1 | 1 |
| By submission | 9 | 6 |
| By decision | 6 | 2 |

| Res. | Record | Opponent | Method | Event | Date | Round | Time | Location | Notes |
|---|---|---|---|---|---|---|---|---|---|
| Win | 16–9 | Erson Yamamoto | Submission (hammerlock) | Rizin 14 | December 31, 2018 | 2 | 3:23 | Saitama, Japan | |
| Win | 15–9 | Andy Souwer | Submission (armbar) | Rizin World Grand-Prix 2016: Second Round | December 29, 2016 | 1 | 4:39 | Saitama, Japan | |
| Win | 14–9 | Askar Umbetov | Submission (arm-triangle choke) | Real 1 | December 23, 2014 | 2 | 1:26 | Tokyo, Japan | |
| Win | 13–9 | Jae Eun Kim | Submission (guillotine choke) | DEEP: Haleo Impact | December 22, 2012 | 1 | 2:46 | Tokyo, Japan | |
| Win | 12–9 | Erzan Estanov | Decision (Unanimous) | RINGS: Vol. 2: Conquisito | September 23, 2012 | 2 | 5:00 | Tokyo, Japan | |
| Loss | 11–9 | Tatsuya Kawajiri | Submission (arm-triangle choke) | Fight For Japan: Genki Desu Ka Omisoka 2011 | December 31, 2011 | 2 | 4:54 | Saitama, Japan | |
| Loss | 11–8 | Hiroyuki Takaya | Decision (split) | DREAM: Japan GP Final | July 16, 2011 | 3 | 5:00 | Tokyo, Japan | For DREAM Featherweight Championship |
| Win | 11–7 | Caol Uno | Decision (unanimous) | Dynamite!! 2010 | December 31, 2010 | 3 | 5:00 | Saitama, Japan | |
| Win | 10–7 | Takeshi Inoue | Decision (unanimous) | DREAM 16 | September 25, 2010 | 2 | 5:00 | Nagoya, Japan | |
| Win | 9–7 | Takafumi Otsuka | Decision (split) | DREAM 14 | May 29, 2010 | 3 | 5:00 | Saitama, Japan | |
| Win | 8–7 | Daiki Hata | Decision (unanimous) | DREAM 11 | October 6, 2009 | 2 | 5:00 | Yokohama, Japan | DREAM Featherweight Grand Prix reserve bout |
| Win | 7–7 | Takeshi Yamazaki | Decision (unanimous) | DEEP: 42 Impact | June 30, 2009 | 3 | 5:00 | Tokyo, Japan | |
| Win | 6–7 | Jae Hyun So | Submission (guillotine choke) | DEEP: 41 Impact | April 16, 2009 | 1 | 2:31 | Tokyo, Japan | |
| Loss | 5–7 | Luiz Firmino | Submission (rear-naked choke) | DREAM 1: Lightweight Grand Prix 2008 First Round | March 15, 2008 | 1 | 7:37 | Tokyo, Japan | DREAM Lightweight Grand Prix Opening Round |
| Loss | 5–6 | Joachim Hansen | Submission (rear-naked choke) | K-1 PREMIUM 2007 Dynamite!! | December 31, 2007 | 2 | 1:33 | Osaka, Japan | |
| Win | 5–5 | Harvey Harra | Submission (armbar) | HERO'S 10 | September 17, 2007 | 1 | 1:13 | Yokohama, Kanagawa, Japan | |
| Loss | 4–5 | Vítor Ribeiro | Submission (arm-triangle choke) | HERO'S 9 | July 16, 2007 | 2 | 1:54 | Yokohama, Kanagawa, Japan | HERO'S 2007 Middleweight Grand Prix Quarterfinal. |
| Win | 4–4 | Kultar Gill | Submission (guillotine choke) | HERO'S 8 | March 12, 2007 | 1 | 5:00 | Nagoya, Japan | |
| Win | 3–4 | Ian James Schaffa | TKO (cut) | HERO'S 7 | October 9, 2006 | 1 | 0:49 | Yokohama, Kanagawa, Japan | |
| Loss | 2–4 | Norifumi Yamamoto | KO (flying knee) | HERO'S 5 | May 3, 2006 | 1 | 0:04 | Tokyo, Japan | |
| Win | 2-3 | Erikas Petraitis | Submission (armbar) | HERO'S 4 | March 15, 2006 | 1 | 3:59 | Tokyo, Japan | |
| Loss | 1–3 | Genki Sudo | Submission (armbar) | HERO'S 3 | September 7, 2005 | 2 | 4:45 | Tokyo, Japan | HERO'S 2005 Middleweight Grand Prix Quarterfinal. |
| Win | 1–2 | Shamil Gaydarbekov | Submission (rear-naked choke) | HERO'S 2 | July 6, 2005 | 1 | 2:49 | Tokyo, Japan | |
| Loss | 0–2 | Ian James Schaffa | Decision (split) | HERO'S 1 | March 26, 2005 | 3 | 5:00 | Saitama, Saitama, Japan | |
| Loss | 0–1 | Royler Gracie | Submission (triangle choke) | Rumble on the Rock | November 20, 2004 | 2 | 2:46 | Honolulu, Hawaii, United States | |
