= Hiroshi Izumi =

Japanese judoka and mixed martial arts fighter

Hiroshi Izumi 泉浩
- Born: June 22, 1982 (age 44); Shimokita District Aomori, Japan
- Height: 5 ft 8 in (1.73 m)
- Weight: 203 lb (92 kg; 14 st 7 lb)
- Division: Light Heavyweight (205 lb)
- Style: Judo
- Fighting out of: Shimokita District Aomori, Japan
- Years active: 2009 – present

Mixed martial arts record
- Total: 6
- Wins: 4
- By knockout: 2
- By decision: 2
- Losses: 2
- By knockout: 2

Other information
- Mixed martial arts record from Sherdog
- Judo career
- Weight class: ‍–‍90 kg
- Rank: 6th dan black belt

Judo achievements and titles
- Olympic Games: (silver) (2004)
- World Champ.: (gold) (2005)
- Asian Champ.: (gold) (2008)
Medal record
Men's judo
Representing Japan
Olympic Games
Silver medal – second place	2004 Athens	‍–‍90 kg
World Championships
Gold medal – first place	2005 Cairo	‍–‍90 kg
Asian Games
Bronze medal – third place	2006 Doha	‍–‍90 kg
Asian Championships
Gold medal – first place	2008 Jeju	‍–‍90 kg
Bronze medal – third place	2004 Almaty	‍–‍90 kg
East Asian Championships
Gold medal – first place	2007 Shenzhen	‍–‍90 kg
Summer Universiade
Gold medal – first place	2003 Jeju	‍–‍90 kg
Silver medal – second place	2002 Novi Sad	‍–‍90 kg

Profile at external judo databases
- IJF: 52687
- JudoInside.com: 13540
- Last updated on: July 7, 2011

Hiroshi Izumi (Japanese: 泉浩; born June 22, 1982, in Shimokita District Aomori) is a Japanese judoka and mixed martial artist. He has fought in World Victory Road and had a one-fight stint in the Dream promotion for the Dream Light Heavyweight Championship. Izumi also appeared in both Dynamite!! 2009 and Dynamite!! 2010 New Year's Eve events.

== Background ==
Izumi was born in Aomori, Japan, and comes from a fishing family in the Shimokita Peninsula. His father, who can often be seen spectating his son's judo and MMA matches, still fishes for bluefin tuna at over 70 years of age. Izumi began judo at a young age and is known as a very accomplished judoka, winning the men's –90 kg category silver medal at the Athens Olympics in 2004 and the gold medal at the World Judo Championship Games in Cairo, Egypt, in 2005.

== Mixed martial arts ==
Izumi made his mixed martial arts debut against New Zealand kickboxing specialist, Antz Nansen for Japan's Sengoku promotion in September 2009 after Izumi signed with World Victory Road. Instead of using his judo techniques to his advantage during his debut, Izumi attempted to trade punches with the world-class striker. Izumi was beaten badly in his debut and lost the fight by TKO.

After his poor performance in his debut, Izumi began turning his mixed martial arts career around. At Dynamite!! 2009, representing Sengoku, he won via unanimous decision over Katsuyori Shibata. After being dominated through the first few rounds, Izumi came back in the second half of the very final round, landing a great sequence of punches and controlling Shibata on the ground, where he utilized many hammerfists. This win was very significant because Izumi's father was vocal in saying that if Izumi was defeated again, that he would take his son out of MMA and return to judo.

Izumi followed this win up with three more wins, including one at Dynamite!! 2010, against former PRIDE veteran and Dream Super Hulk Tournament Champion Ikuhisa Minowa by TKO. This is perhaps the biggest win of his career to date.

Izumi then earned a title shot at Gegard Mousasi for the Dream Light Heavyweight Championship, but lost by TKO.

== Mixed martial arts record ==
Professional record breakdown
6 matches	4 wins	2 losses
By knockout	2	2
By decision	2	0

Res.	Record	Opponent	Method	Event	Date	Round	Time	Location	Notes
Loss	4–2	Gegard Mousasi	TKO (punches)	Dream: Japan GP Final	July 16, 2011	1	3:28	Tokyo, Japan	For Dream Light Heavyweight Championship
Win	4–1	Ikuhisa Minowa	TKO (punches)	Dynamite!! 2010	December 31, 2010	3	2:50	Saitama, Saitama, Japan	Openweight bout
Win	3–1	James Zikic	Decision (split)	World Victory Road Presents: Sengoku Raiden Championships 15	October 30, 2010	3	5:00	Tokyo, Japan	
Win	2–1	Chang Seob Lee	TKO (punches)	World Victory Road Presents: Sengoku Raiden Championships 13	June 20, 2010	1	4:37	Tokyo, Japan	
Win	1–1	Katsuyori Shibata	Decision (unanimous)	Dynamite!! 2009	December 31, 2009	3	5:00	Saitama, Saitama, Japan	
Loss	0–1	Antz Nansen	TKO (punches)	World Victory Road Presents: Sengoku 10	September 23, 2009	1	2:56	Saitama, Saitama, Japan	
