= Hideo Tokoro =

Japanese martial artist

- Born: August 22, 1977 (age 49); Gifu, Japan
- Other names: Little Volk Han, The Magician of the Ring
- Nationality: Japanese
- Height: 5 ft 7 in (1.70 m)
- Weight: 156 lb (71 kg; 11.1 st)
- Division: Heavyweight; Middleweight; Welterweight; Lightweight; Featherweight; Bantamweight; Flyweight
- Fighting out of: Gifu, Japan
- Team: Reversal Gym Tokoro Plus
- Teachers: Kenichi Yamamoto; Akira Maeda

Mixed martial arts record
- Total: 71
- Wins: 36
- By knockout: 6
- By submission: 21
- By decision: 9
- Losses: 34
- By knockout: 14
- By submission: 7
- By decision: 13
- Draws: 1

Other information
- Mixed martial arts record from Sherdog

Hideo Tokoro (born August 22, 1977) is a Japanese mixed martial artist who last competed in the Bantamweight division. A professional competitor since 2000, Tokoro has also formerly competed for Vale Tudo Japan, ZST, Shooto, Rings and K-1 Hero's. He is notable for holding the record for most weight divisions competed in by a professional MMA fighter, at seven, ranging from flyweight through to heavyweight.

== Mixed martial arts career ==
Tokoro got his first contact with mixed martial arts in 1999, joining Kenichi Yamamoto's Power of Dream gym. He debuted in Titan Fighting Championship in 2000 and moved to multiple promotions, among them Fighting Network Rings, Shooto, ZST and K-1, the latter of which signed him up for its Hero's MMA promotion. Up to that point, as fighting wasn't enough to make a living, Tokoro had worked part-time as a janitor, an aspect which K-1 promoted heavily in order to show him as a humble, hard-working underdog figure.

=== Hero's ===
Tokoro had his debut in Hero's in 2005 in the Lightweight Grand Prix Quarterfinal. He went against the well regarded Alexandre Franca Nogueira, and shocked pundits by knocking him out with a spinning backfist at the end of a fast-paced, back and forth match. Tokoro advanced round against Shooto veteran Caol Uno, but he was controlled and damaged for a unanimous decision loss.

On December 31, 2005, Tokoro faced Royce Gracie from the Gracie family at the K-1 Premium Dynamite!!! event in a much publicized match. The bout had special stipulations, as Royce had demanded no judge decision and 10-minute rounds, and was fought at openweight, with the Brazilian outweighing Tokoro by 40 lbs. Still, Hideo gave an excellent performance, controlling the stand-up and forcing Gracie to play conservatively on his own field of strength.

Immediately landing a punch combo and a high kick, the Japanese passed the first round in Gracie's guard, slamming him several times and bloodying his opponent's face with ground and pound, while Gracie kept himself active with heel kicks and short hammerfists. At the second, Tokoro fell in bad position upon trying a spinning kick, becoming entangled in a series of reversals both in the clinch and on the ground and being forced to defend a rear naked choke, but he ended the match again attacking Royce's guard. The match ended in a draw as stipulated, but Tokoro was seen by many as a moral victor, which boosted his popularity.

At K-1 Premium Dynamite!!! 2006, Tokoro faced another member of the Gracie family, this time Royce's brother, Royler, more similar to Tokoro in size and under regular rules. The Brazilian was successful in taking the fight to the mat, but Tokoro counterattacked from the bottom with unceasing submission attempts. Returning to their feet, Gracie tried to clinch, but Hideo landed a heavy jumping knee and knocked Royler down with punches. The Japanese would be momentarily thwarted after failing a flying Kimura lock attempt, but he swept Gracie and controlled him for the rest of the match, winning a unanimous decision.

Tokoro also participated in Dynamite!! USA in 2007, submitting Brad Pickett by armbar.

Also in 2007, Tokoro faced Rings legend Kiyoshi Tamura at the Dynamite!!! event. The heavier Tamura capitalized on his striking and wrestling advantage to control the bout, which forced Tokoro to absorb punishment and use every opportunity to scramble to try to get his game. At the third round, Tamura tried a Kimura lock, and although he couldn't twist the arm, he stretched it. Tokoro refused to tap out, but the match was eventually called off by submission.

=== Dream ===
Tokoro competed in Dream's Featherweight Grand Prix where he lost in the first round to Daiki Hata, but was brought back into the tournament and defeated Abel Cullum in the second round, before losing to Hiroyuki Takaya in the semi-finals.

Tokoro faced Antonio Banuelos in the opening Bantamweight Grand Prix round at Dream 17 at Saitami Super Arena in Saitama, Japan, on Sept. 24. He lost the fight via split decision.

Tokoro lost to Yusup Saadulaev in a tournament reserve bout on December 31, 2011, at Fight For Japan: Genki Desu Ka Omisoka 2011 via KO (slam) in the first round.

=== Vale Tudo Japan ===
Tokoro faced Rumina Sato at Vale Tudo Japan 2012 on December 24, 2012. Tokoro defeated Sato by TKO in the first round.

He then faced Taylor McCorriston at Vale Tudo Japan: VTJ 2nd on June 22, 2013. Tokoro won the fight via heel hook submission.

In his latest fight, Tokoro faced UFC veteran Will Campuzano at Vale Tudo Japan: VTJ 3rd on October 5, 2013. He lost the fight via split decision.

=== Other promotions ===
Fighting outside of Vale Tudo Japan, Tokoro faced Victor Henry at Grandslam MMA: Way of the Cage on July 13, 2014. He lost the fight via second-round TKO.

=== Bellator MMA ===
Tokoro made his Bellator debut against LC Davis on March 27, 2015 at Bellator 135. He lost the back-and-forth fight via split decision.

=== Rizin Fighting Federation ===
In his debut for the Rizin Fighting Federation, Tokoro faced Kizaemon Siaga on December 29, 2015. He won the fight via submission due to an armbar in the first round.

In his second fight for the promotion, Tokoro faced Kron Gracie on September 25, 2016 at Rizin World Grand-Prix 2016: First Round. He lost the fight via submission in the first round.

In his third fight for the promotion, Tokoro faced Erson Yamamoto on December 31, 2016 at Rizin World Grand-Prix 2016: Final Round. He won the fight via submission in the first round.

==== Rizin FF Bantamweight GP ====
In his next fight for Rizin, Tokoro faced Kyoji Horiguchi in the first round of the 2017 Rizin Bantamweight Grand Prix on July 30, 2017 at Rizin 6. He lost the fight via knockout in the first round.

==== Hiatus and post-GP tenure ====
Tokoro returned to MMA, after a three year hiatus, to fight the Olympic wrestling silver medalist Shinobu Ota at Rizin 26. He won the fight by submission, snatching an armbar midway through the second round.

Tokoro faced Makoto Takahashi at Rizin 37 - Saitama on July 31, 2022, following a two-year absence from the sport. He lost the fight by unanimous decision.

Tokoro faced John Dodson on December 31, 2022 at Rizin 40. He lost the bout by knockout in the first round via punches.

Tokoro headlined Rizin Landmark 6 against Alan Yamaniha on October 1, 2023. He lost the bout via unanimous decision.

== Fighting style ==
Tokoro uses a style described as "breakneck paced" and "exciting." A skilled grappler, he works at high-speed on the ground and takes all risks with bold submission attempts, often leaving himself open to counterattacks in order to seek a chance to win. He favors shoot wrestling-inspired entries and leglocks, but is known for his brilliant positional work too. Despite this, he is also dangerous on his feet, counting on fast punches and jumping knees, as well as unorthodox attacks like spinning backfists and even spinning heel kicks.

== Championships and accomplishments ==
- Dream
  - 2011 Dream Japanese Bantamweight Grand Prix Champion
  - 2009 Dream Featherweight Grand Prix Semifinalist
- Yahoo! Sports
  - 2015 Best Fight of the Half-Year vs. LC Davis

== Mixed martial arts record ==
Professional record breakdown
| 71 matches | 36 wins | 34 losses |
| By knockout | 6 | 14 |
| By submission | 21 | 7 |
| By decision | 9 | 13 |
| Draws | 1 | |

| Res. | Record | Opponent | Method | Event | Date | Round | Time | Location | Notes |
|---|---|---|---|---|---|---|---|---|---|
| Loss | 36–34–1 | Jinnosuke Kashimura | Technical Submission (anaconda choke) | Rizin 52 | March 7, 2026 | 1 | 1:26 | Tokyo, Japan | |
| Win | 36–33–1 | Hiroya Kondo | TKO (punch and elbows) | Super Rizin 3 | July 28, 2024 | 1 | 3:20 | Saitama, Japan | Catchweight (130 lb) bout. |
| Loss | 35–33–1 | Alan Yamaniha | Decision (unanimous) | Rizin Landmark 6 | October 1, 2023 | 3 | 5:00 | Nagoya, Japan | Return to Bantamweight. |
| Loss | 35–32–1 | John Dodson | KO (punches) | Rizin 40 | December 31, 2022 | 1 | 1:43 | Saitama, Japan | |
| Loss | 35–31–1 | Makoto Takahashi | Decision (unanimous) | Rizin 37 | July 31, 2022 | 3 | 5:00 | Saitama, Japan | Return to Flyweight. |
| Win | 35–30–1 | Shinobu Ota | Submission (armbar) | Rizin 26 | December 31, 2020 | 2 | 2:23 | Saitama, Japan | |
| Loss | 34–30–1 | Kyoji Horiguchi | KO (punches) | Rizin World Grand Prix 2017: 1st Round | July 30, 2017 | 1 | 1:49 | Saitama, Japan | 2017 Rizin Bantamweight Grand Prix First Round. |
| Win | 34–29–1 | Asen Yamamoto | Submission (armbar) | Rizin World Grand Prix 2016: Final Round | December 31, 2016 | 1 | 1:19 | Saitama, Japan | |
| Loss | 33–29–1 | Kron Gracie | Submission (rear-naked choke) | Rizin World Grand Prix 2016: 1st Round | September 25, 2016 | 1 | 9:45 | Saitama, Japan | Featherweight bout. |
| Win | 33–28–1 | Kizaemon Siaga | Submission (armbar) | Rizin World Grand Prix 2015: Part 1 - Saraba | December 29, 2015 | 1 | 5:15 | Saitama, Japan | |
| Loss | 32–28–1 | LC Davis | Decision (split) | Bellator 135 | March 27, 2015 | 3 | 5:00 | Thackerville, Oklahoma, United States | |
| Loss | 32–27–1 | Victor Henry | TKO (punches) | Grandslam MMA: Way of the Cage | July 13, 2014 | 2 | 1:52 | Tokyo, Japan | Return to Featherweight. |
| Loss | 32–26–1 | Will Campuzano | Decision (split) | Vale Tudo Japan: VTJ 3rd | October 5, 2013 | 3 | 5:00 | Tokyo, Japan | Flyweight debut. |
| Win | 32–25–1 | Taylor McCorriston | Submission (inverted heel hook) | Vale Tudo Japan: VTJ 2nd | June 22, 2013 | 2 | 2:34 | Tokyo, Japan | |
| Win | 31–25–1 | Rumina Sato | TKO (punches and elbows) | Vale Tudo Japan: VTJ 1st | December 24, 2012 | 1 | 0:39 | Tokyo, Japan | |
| Loss | 30–25–1 | Yusup Saadulaev | KO (slam) | Fight For Japan: Genki Desu Ka Omisoka 2011 | December 31, 2011 | 1 | 0:42 | Saitama, Japan | 2011 Dream Bantamweight Tournament Reserve bout. |
| Loss | 30–24–1 | Antonio Banuelos | Decision (split) | Dream 17 | September 24, 2011 | 3 | 5:00 | Saitama, Japan | 2011 Dream Bantamweight Tournament Quarterfinal. |
| Win | 30–23–1 | Masakazu Imanari | Decision (unanimous) | Dream: Japan GP Final | July 16, 2011 | 2 | 5:00 | Tokyo, Japan | Won the Dream Japan Bantamweight Grand Prix. |
| Win | 29–23–1 | Atsushi Yamamoto | Decision (split) | Dream: Fight for Japan! | May 29, 2011 | 2 | 5:00 | Saitama, Japan | Dream Japan Bantamweight Grand Prix Semifinal. |
| Win | 28–23–1 | Yoshiro Maeda | TKO (corner stoppage) | Dream: Fight for Japan! | May 29, 2011 | 2 | 0:43 | Saitama, Japan | Return to Bantamweight. Dream Japan Bantamweight Grand Prix Quarterfinal. |
| Win | 27–23–1 | Kazuhisa Watanabe | Submission (armbar) | Dynamite!! 2010 | December 31, 2010 | 3 | 2:50 | Saitama, Japan | |
| Loss | 26–23–1 | Joachim Hansen | Submission (triangle choke) | Dream 16 | September 25, 2010 | 1 | 2:48 | Nagoya, Japan | |
| Loss | 26–22–1 | Akiyo Nishiura | TKO (punches) | Dream 14 | May 29, 2010 | 1 | 2:51 | Saitama, Japan | |
| Win | 26–21–1 | Kim Jong-man | Decision (unanimous) | Dynamite!! 2009 | Dec 31, 2009 | 3 | 5:00 | Saitama, Japan | |
| Loss | 25–21–1 | Hiroyuki Takaya | TKO (punches) | Dream 11 | Oct 6, 2009 | 2 | 0:32 | Yokohama, Japan | 2009 Dream Featherweight Grand Prix Semifinal. |
| Win | 25–20–1 | Abel Cullum | Submission (rear-naked choke) | Dream 9 | May 26, 2009 | 2 | 1:38 | Yokohama, Japan | 2009 Dream Featherweight Grand Prix Quarterfinal. |
| Loss | 24–20–1 | Daiki Hata | Decision (unanimous) | Dream 8 | April 5, 2009 | 2 | 5:00 | Nagoya, Japan | 2009 Dream Featherweight Grand Prix Round of 16. |
| Loss | 24–19–1 | Daisuke Nakamura | Submission (armbar) | Dynamite!! 2008 | December 31, 2008 | 1 | 2:23 | Saitama, Japan | Catchweight (150 lb) bout. |
| Loss | 24–18–1 | Atsushi Yamamoto | Decision (unanimous) | Dream 6 | September 23, 2008 | 2 | 5:00 | Saitama, Japan | |
| Win | 24–17–1 | Takeshi Yamazaki | Decision (unanimous) | Dream 5 | July 21, 2008 | 2 | 5:00 | Osaka, Japan | |
| Win | 23–17–1 | Darren Uyenoyama | Decision (unanimous) | Dream 4 | June 15, 2008 | 2 | 5:00 | Yokohama, Japan | Return to Featherweight. |
| Loss | 22–17–1 | Kiyoshi Tamura | Submission (kimura) | K-1 Premium 2007 Dynamite!! | December 31, 2007 | 3 | 3:08 | Osaka, Japan | Middleweight debut. |
| Win | 22–16–1 | Wataru Inatsu | Submission (armbar) | K-1 PREMIUM 2006 Dynamite!! | November 23, 2007 | 1 | 1:35 | Tokyo, Japan | |
| Loss | 21–16–1 | Kultar Gill | TKO (punches) | Hero's 9 | July 16, 2007 | 1 | 4:47 | Yokohama, Japan | 2007 Hero's Lightweight Grand Prix Quarterfinal. |
| Win | 21–15–1 | Brad Pickett | Submission (armbar) | Dynamite!! USA | June 2, 2007 | 1 | 2:41 | Los Angeles, California, United States | |
| Win | 20–15–1 | Kazuya Yasuhiro | Submission (armbar) | Hero's 8 | March 12, 2007 | 1 | 3:00 | Nagoya, Japan | |
| Win | 19–15–1 | Royler Gracie | Decision (unanimous) | K-1 PREMIUM 2006 Dynamite!! | December 31, 2006 | 3 | 5:00 | Osaka, Japan | |
| Win | 18–15–1 | Ken Kaneko | Submission (armbar) | Hero's 7 | October 9, 2006 | 1 | 1:50 | Tokyo, Japan | Return to Lightweight. |
| Loss | 17–15–1 | Ivan Menjivar | Decision (majority) | Hero's 6 | August 5, 2006 | 2 | 5:00 | Tokyo, Japan | 2006 Hero's Welterweight Grand Prix Quarterfinal. |
| Loss | 17–14–1 | Kultar Gill | KO (knee and punches) | Hero's 5 | May 3, 2006 | 1 | 0:43 | Tokyo, Japan | Return to Welterweight. |
| Win | 17–13–1 | Yoshinori Ikeda | Technical Submission (triangle choke) | Hero's 4 | March 15, 2006 | 1 | 0:49 | Tokyo, Japan | Light Heavyweight debut. |
| Loss | 16–13–1 | Erikas Petraitis | KO (knee) | Fighting Network ZST 9 | February 18, 2006 | 2 | 4:03 | Tokyo, Japan | Lightweight bout. |
| Draw | 16–12–1 | Royce Gracie | Draw (unanimous) | K-1 PREMIUM 2005 Dynamite!! | December 31, 2005 | 2 | 10:00 | Osaka, Japan | Welterweight debut. |
| Win | 16–12 | Gabe Lemley | Submission (triangle choke) | K-1 World MAX 2005 Champions Challenge | October 12, 2005 | 1 | 1:12 | Tokyo, Japan | |
| Loss | 15–12 | Caol Uno | Decision (unanimous) | Hero's 3 | September 7, 2005 | 2 | 5:00 | Tokyo, Japan | 2005 Hero's Lightweight Grand Prix Quarterfinal. |
| Win | 15–11 | Alexandre Franca Nogueira | KO (spinning backfist) | Hero's 2 | July 6, 2005 | 3 | 0:08 | Tokyo, Japan | 2005 Hero's Lightweight Grand Prix Round of 16. |
| Win | 14–11 | Erikas Petraitis | Decision | Shooto Lithuania: Chaosas | April 7, 2005 | 2 | 5:00 | Vilnius, Lithuania | |
| Loss | 13-11 | Masahiro Oishi | Decision (split) | Fighting Network ZST: Grand Prix 2 Final Round | January 23, 2005 | 3 | 3:00 | Tokyo, Japan | |
| Loss | 13–10 | Darius Skliaudys | Decision | Shooto Lithuania: Bushido | November 20, 2004 | 2 | 5:00 | Vilnius, Lithuania | |
| Win | 13–9 | Shuichiro Katsumura | Technical Submission (guillotine choke) | Fighting Network ZST: Grand Prix 2 Opening Round | November 3, 2004 | 1 | 0:38 | Tokyo, Japan | |
| Loss | 12–9 | Naoyuki Kotani | Submission (heel hook) | Fighting Network ZST 6 | September 12, 2004 | 1 | 1:44 | Tokyo, Japan | Return to Lightweight. |
| Win | 12–8 | Shinya Sato | Submission (triangle choke) | Fighting Network ZST: Battle Hazard 1 | July 4, 2004 | 1 | 3:23 | Tokyo, Japan | |
| Win | 11–8 | Remigijus Morkevicius | Submission (triangle choke) | Fighting Network ZST 5 | May 5, 2004 | 1 | 3:30 | Tokyo, Japan | Featherweight bout. |
| Win | 10–8 | Erikas Petraitis | Submission (rear-naked choke) | Shooto Lithuania: Vendetta | April 4, 2004 | 2 | 3:40 | Vilnius, Lithuania | Bantamweight debut. |
| Loss | 9–8 | Tomomi Iwama | TKO (head kicks) | Fighting Network ZST: Grand Prix Final Round | January 11, 2004 | 1 | 0:53 | Tokyo, Japan | 2003 ZST Lightweight Grand Prix Semifinal. |
| Win | 9–7 | Masahiro Oishi | Submission (armbar) | Fighting Network ZST: Grand Prix Opening Round | November 23, 2003 | 1 | 3:13 | Tokyo, Japan | 2003 ZST Lightweight Grand Prix Quarterfinal. |
| Win | 8–7 | Taiyo Nakahara | Submission (armbar) | Fighting Network ZST: The Battlefield 4 | September 7, 2003 | 1 | 4:56 | Tokyo, Japan | |
| Loss | 7–7 | Remigijus Morkevicius | KO (knees) | Fighting Network ZST: The Battlefield 3 | June 1, 2003 | 1 | 2:54 | Tokyo, Japan | |
| Loss | 7–6 | Antanas Jazbutis | Decision (1–0 points) | Rings Lithuania: Bushido Rings 7 | April 5, 2003 | 2 | 5:00 | Vilnius, Lithuania | Return to Lightweight. |
| Win | 7–5 | Hidehiko Matsumoto | Decision (split) | Fighting Network ZST: The Battlefield 2 | March 9, 2003 | 3 | 3:00 | Tokyo, Japan | Featherweight debut. |
| Win | 6–5 | Atsuhiro Tsuboi | Submission (armbar) | Fighting Network ZST: The Battlefield 1 | November 23, 2003 | 2 | 4:09 | Tokyo, Japan | |
| Win | 5–5 | Masaya Takita | TKO (doctor stoppage) | Greatest Common Multiple: Demolition 020908 | September 8, 2002 | 1 | 1:41 | Yokohama, Japan | |
| Win | 4–5 | Takumi Yano | Decision (unanimous) | Premium Challenge 1 | May 6, 2002 | 1 | 10:00 | Tokyo, Japan | |
| Loss | 3–5 | Naoyuki Kotani | Decision (majority) | Rings Japan: Battle Genesis Vol. 8 | September 21, 2001 | 3 | 5:00 | Tokyo, Japan | |
| Loss | 3–4 | Takayuki Yamamoto | TKO (punches) | Titan FC 4 | July 1, 2001 | 1 | 3:50 | Tokyo, Japan | |
| Win | 3–3 | Akira Nitagai | Submission (heel hook) | Titan FC 4 | July 1, 2001 | 1 | 5:12 | Tokyo, Japan | |
| Win | 2–3 | Sumio Koyano | TKO (punches) | Titan FC 4 | July 1, 2001 | 1 | 0:56 | Tokyo, Japan | |
| Loss | 1–3 | Masashi Suzuki | TKO (punches) | Titan FC 3 | April 30, 2001 | 1 | 1:57 | Tokyo, Japan | |
| Loss | 1–2 | Yuji Hisamatsu | TKO (punches) | Titan FC 2 | January 21, 2001 | 1 | 0:56 | Tokyo, Japan | |
| Win | 1–1 | Wataru Yoshikawa | Submission (armbar) | Titan FC 2 | January 21, 2001 | 1 | 2:19 | Tokyo, Japan | |
| Loss | 0–1 | Naoto Ichikawa | Submission (rear-naked choke) | Titan FC 1 | September 29, 2000 | 2 | 3:59 | Tokyo, Japan | Lightweight debut. |

== Submission grappling record ==
KO PUNCHES

| Result | Opponent | Method | Event | Date | Round | Time | Notes |
|---|---|---|---|---|---|---|---|
| Loss | (Japan) Ikuhisa Minowa | Submission (ankle hold) | Quintet Fight Night 4 | November 30, 2019 | 1 | | |
| Loss | (Japan) Shutaro Debana | Submission (sode guruma jime) | Quintet Fight Night 2 | February 3, 2019 | 1 | | |
| Loss | (United Kingdom) Dan Strauss | Submission (guillotine choke) | Quintet | April 11, 2018 | 1 | | |
| Loss | (South Korea) Dong Sik Yoon | Submission (sode guruma jime) | Quintet | April 11, 2018 | 1 | | |
| Win | (South Korea) Hyun Jun Kim | Submission (armbar) | Quintet | April 11, 2018 | 1 | | |
| Draw | (Brazil) Wanderlei Silva and (Japan) Kiyoshi Tamura | Draw | Rizin FF 1 | 2016 | 1 | 15:00 | Partnered with (Japan) Kazushi Sakuraba |
