= Fighting and Entertainment Group =

Japanese combat sport promoter

Fighting and Entertainment Group (FEG)
- Type: Private
- Industry: Sports promotion
- Founded: 2003
- Founder: Sadaharu Tanikawa
- Defunct: 2012
- Fate: Bankruptcy
- Headquarters: Tokyo, Japan
- Key people: Sadaharu Tanikawa (President)
- Subsidiaries: Dream

K-1 logo, formerly promoted by the Fighting and Entertainment Group

Fighting and Entertainment Group (FEG) was the leading Japanese combat sport promoter founded on September 3, 2003. Its last president was Sadaharu Tanikawa and it was the parent company behind the now-defunct mixed martial arts series Dream and formerly, the largest kickboxing promotion in the world, K-1.

FEG was founded in order to administrate K-1 after its founder and president Kazuyoshi Ishii was arrested for money laundering. Sports journalist and Ishii's acquaintance Sadaharu Tanikawa was his successor and created FEG as a holding company for K-1, eventually including other events under its umbrella, such as MMA promotions Rumble on the Rock, Hero's and Dream, as well doing co-productions with Dream Stage Entertainment, the parent company of PRIDE Fighting Championships.

== Financial crisis ==
On December 31, 2010, after the Dream event Dynamite!! 2010, Tanikawa announced a three-month hiatus for FEG, stating, "2011 is a comeback year for us. We will restructure the company for three months and start holding events in the spring."

In January 2011, Sadaharu Tanikawa told a Japanese publication that, "The current course is that FEG will die", leading to further speculation about the future of FEG. FEG USA's Mike Kogan added, "[U]nless the money comes now, meaning the investors that have been talking commit and we start to move forward, the company will die. There is no way for it to survive, we have exhausted all good will."

On July 28, 2011, FEG sold K-1 along with most of its trademarks to Japanese real estate firm Barbizon Co. Ltd.

On May 16, 2012, Tanikawa officially declared the bankruptcy of FEG.

== See also ==
- Yarennoka!
- Hero's
