= Jani Lax =

Swedish mixed martial artist

- Born: October 26, 1977 (age 48); Gävle, Sweden
- Nationality: Swedish
- Height: 5 ft 10 in (1.78 m)
- Weight: 153 lb (69 kg; 10.9 st)
- Division: Lightweight
- Style: Kickboxing
- Fighting out of: Karlstad, Sweden
- Team: Team Scandinavia
- Years active: 1999–present

Mixed martial arts record
- Total: 18
- Wins: 10
- By knockout: 2
- By submission: 6
- By decision: 2
- Losses: 8
- By knockout: 5
- By submission: 3

Other information
- Mixed martial arts record from Sherdog
- Last updated on: September 10, 2010

Jani Lax (born October 26, 1977) is a Swedish professional mixed martial artist and occasional kickboxer, who competes in the Lightweight division. He has fought around the world in a number of promotions including Finnfight, K-1, M-1 Global and Shooto.

== Career ==
Lax began his mixed martial arts career in 1999 with Finnfight, one of the largest promotions in the Nordic countries and known for its brutal no-holds-barred rules. He lost his debut against Marcus Peltonen by knockout in the first round, but went on to defeat Joachim Hansen in his next bout.

After Finnfight, he fought in M-1 Global in Russia, where he had one win and one loss. He then went to Japan to fight with Shooto, where his promotional debut came against Akira Kikuchi. Kikuchi was able to submit him in the first round. After this loss, he had a four-fight winning streak spanning across Europe and Japan. It was halted, however, when he came up against Tatsuya Kawajiri in April 2005. He also lost his next two bouts, against Hiroyuki Takaya and Alexandre Izidro.

In May 2010, he returned to the ring for the first time in almost three years and submitted Danny van Bergen at an M-1 Global event in Helsinki. His next bout was scheduled to be in the British Association of Mixed Martial Arts promotion against Rob Sinclair for the BAMMA Lightweight Championship at BAMMA 4: Reid vs. Watson on September 25, 2010. However, just three days before the fight, Lax withdrew with an injury.

== Mixed martial arts record ==
Professional record breakdown
18 matches	10 wins	8 losses
By knockout	2	5
By submission	6	3
By decision	2	0

Res.	Record	Opponent	Method	Event	Date	Round	Time	Location	Notes
Win	10–8	Bobby McVittie	KO (punches)	Vision FC - Fight Night 1	May 5, 2012	1	0:59	Karlstad, Sweden	
Loss	9–8	Kenichiro Togashi	TKO (doctor stoppage)	Shooto: The Way of Shooto 4: Like a Tiger, Like a Dragon	July 19, 2010	3	1:30	Tokyo, Japan	
Win	9–7	Danny van Bergen	Submission (armbar)	M-1 Selection 2010: Western Europe Round 3	May 29, 2010	1	2:40	Helsinki, Finland	
Loss	8–7	Takashi Nakakura	Submission (achilles lock)	Shooto: Back To Our Roots 4	July 15, 2007	1	2:54	Tokyo, Japan	
Win	8–6	John Mahlow	Decision (split)	Ironheart Crown 11: Apocalypse	November 18, 2006	3	5:00	Hammond, Indiana, United States	
Loss	7–6	Alexandre Izidro	Submission (guillotine choke)	CWFC: Strike Force 3	October 1, 2005	1	2:58	Coventry, England	For the vacant Cage Warriors Lightweight Championship.
Loss	7–5	Hiroyuki Takaya	TKO (punch)	K-1 Hero's 2	July 6, 2005	1	1:56	Tokyo, Japan	
Loss	7–4	Tatsuya Kawajiri	TKO (punches)	Shooto: 4/23 in Hakata Star Lanes	April 23, 2005	1	4:42	Hakata, Japan	
Win	7–3	Metin Yakut	Submission (armbar)	G-Shooto: G-Shooto 02	March 12, 2005	1	3:28	Stockholm, Sweden	
Win	6–3	Kohei Yasumi	Submission (guillotine choke)	Shooto: Wanna Shooto 2004	November 12, 2004	2	3:25	Tokyo, Japan	
Win	5–3	Oliver Ellis	Submission (rear-naked choke)	Shooto Sweden: Initial Collision	October 3, 2004	1	2:24	Stockholm, Sweden	
Win	4–3	Mikael Lähdesmäki	Decision (unanimous)	Shooto Finland: Capital Punishment 2	April 5, 2004	2	5:00	Helsinki, Finland	
Loss	3–3	Akira Kikuchi	Submission (kimura)	Shooto - Wanna Shooto 2002	April 14, 2002	1	2:51	Tokyo, Japan	
Win	3–2	Musail Allaudinov	Submission (rear-naked choke)	M-1 MFC - European Championship 2002	February 15, 2002	1	0:44	St. Petersburg, Russia	
Loss	2–2	Sergei Bytchkov	TKO (punches)	M-1 MFC - Russia vs. the World 2	November 11, 2001	1	3:00	St. Petersburg, Russia	
Win	2–1	Toni Stenman	KO	Finnfight 4	December 2, 2000	1	5:37	Turku, Finland	
Win	1–1	Joachim Hansen	Submission (rear-naked choke)	Finnfight 4	December 2, 2000	1	9:25	Turku, Finland	
Loss	0–1	Marcus Peltonen	KO (headkick)	Finnfight 3	November 6, 1999	1	0:58	Turku, Finland	

== Kickboxing record ==
Kickboxing record
Result	Record	Opponent	Method	Event	Date	Round	Time	Location	Notes
Loss	0-1	(Japan) Hayato Sakurai	Decision (unanimous)	Shootboxing Battle Summit Ground Zero Tokyo 2007	October 28, 2007	3	3:00	Tokyo, Japan

Legend: Win Loss Draw/No contest
