= Dream 9 =

Mixed martial arts event in 2009

Dream.9: Feather Weight Grand Prix 2009 Second Round
- The poster for Dream.9: Feather Weight Grand Prix 2009 Second Round
- Promotion: Dream
- Date: May 26, 2009
- Venue: Yokohama Arena
- City: Yokohama, Kanagawa, Japan
- Attendance: 15,009

Event chronology
Dream.8: Welter Weight Grand Prix 2009 First Round	Dream.9: Feather Weight Grand Prix 2009 Second Round	Dream 10: Welter Weight Grand Prix 2009 Final Round

Dream.9: Feather Weight Grand Prix 2009 Second Round was a mixed martial arts event promoted by Fighting and Entertainment Group's mixed martial arts promotion Dream on May 26, 2009. It featured the second round of the promotion's featherweight (63 kilograms (139 lb)) grand prix and saw the return of Norifumi Yamamoto, who was given a first round bye, as well as a middleweight title fight between Ronaldo Souza and Jason Miller.

== Results ==
Dream Middleweight title fight
Weight class				Method	Round	Time	Notes
Middleweight	Ronaldo Souza	vs.	Jason Miller	NC (Cut from an Illegal Kick)	1	2:33
Second Round Featherweight Grand Prix
Featherweight	Hideo Tokoro	def.	Abel Cullum	Submission (Rear-Naked Choke)	2	1:38
Featherweight	Hiroyuki Takaya	def.	Yoshiro Maeda	TKO (Punches)	1	9:40
Featherweight	Bibiano Fernandes	def.	Masakazu Imanari	Decision (Unanimous)	2	5:00
Featherweight	Joe Warren	def.	Norifumi Yamamoto	Decision (Split)	2	5:00
Lightweight bout
Lightweight	Tatsuya Kawajiri	def.	Gesias Cavalcante	Decision (Unanimous)	2	5:00
First Round Super Hulk Grand Prix
Super Heavyweight	Gegard Mousasi	def.	Mark Hunt	Submission (Straight Armbar)	1	1:19
Super Heavyweight	Rameau Thierry Sokoudjou	def.	Jan Nortje	TKO (Punches)	1	2:29
Super Heavyweight	Hong Man Choi	def.	Jose Canseco	TKO (submission to punches)	1	1:17
Super Heavyweight	Ikuhisa Minowa	def.	Bob Sapp	Submission (Achilles Lock)	1	1:15

== See also ==
- Dream (mixed martial arts)
- List of Dream champions
- 2009 in DREAM

== Notes ==
- Norifumi "Kid" Yamamoto entered the second round of the grand prix after receiving a first round bye at Dream 7 due to recovering from reconstructive knee surgery.
- Hideo Tokoro and Daiki Hata fought at Dream.8 after Hata was unable to fight at Dream 7.
- Tokoro replaced the injured Daiki Hata.
- Dream 9 was the first Dream event to air in prime time on Tokyo Broadcasting System since Dream 6 in September 2008. During the same time slot WBC Flyweight Champion Daisuke Naito defended his title against Xiong Zhao Zhong.
- Dream 9 aired live on North American based cable network HDNet at 5 am EST and again on tape delay later in the day.
