= Joachim Hansen (fighter) =

Norwegian mixed martial artist

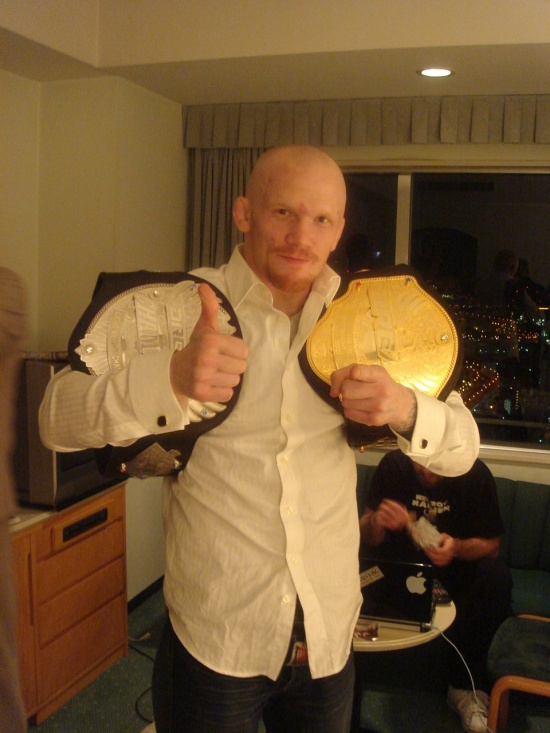
- Born: 26 May 1979 (age 47); Oslo, Norway
- Other names: Hellboy
- Height: 5 ft 10 in (1.78 m)
- Weight: 155 lb (70 kg; 11.1 st)
- Division: Featherweight; Lightweight
- Stance: Southpaw
- Fighting out of: Oslo, Norway
- Team: Hellboy Hansen MMA; 357 MMA
- Rank: Black belt in Brazilian jiu-jitsu
- Years active: 1999–2016

Kickboxing record
- Total: 2
- Wins: 1
- Losses: 1

Mixed martial arts record
- Total: 38
- Wins: 23
- By knockout: 7
- By submission: 8
- By decision: 8
- Losses: 14
- By knockout: 3
- By submission: 5
- By decision: 5
- By disqualification: 1
- Draws: 1

Other information
- Mixed martial arts record from Sherdog
- Last updated on: 22 February 2013

Joachim B. Hansen (born 26 May 1979) is a retired Norwegian mixed martial artist. He began his career fighting for FinnFight before moving on to fight for Shooto where he became the first Scandinavian person to hold an MMA world title after winning the Shooto World Lightweight Championship in 2003 from Takanori Gomi. Hansen later fought for the Pride Fighting Championship and most recently Dream where he became the Dream Lightweight Champion.

== Background ==
Hansen was born in Oslo, Norway, to a Norwegian father and a Scottish mother. Aside from his career as a fighter, he has a job delivering goods in Oslo. Hansen's passion in martial arts began after seeing Jackie Chan films in his youth, and he began training in Brazilian jiu-jitsu when he was 19 years old. He is good friends with former UFC veteran and Norwegian-Brazilian jiu-jitsu specialist John Olav Einemo.

== Mixed martial arts career ==
=== FinnFight and Shooto ===
Joachim "Hellboy" Hansen began his career fighting for Finnish promotion FinnFight before moving on to fight for Shooto's Finnish branch. His performance got him invited to Shooto's year-end show in 2002, where he, with a 3–1 record, faced Takumi Nakayama who at the time had 14 fights under his belt. Hansen won a majority decision. Hansen's performance impressed Shooto veteran Rumina Sato who challenged Hansen after the match. Three months later the two met, with Hansen defeating the Japanese fighter two minutes into the bout by TKO. The win set him up for a title shot against the Shooto Lightweight Champion, and at the time 14–0, Takanori Gomi. The fight went the distance with Hansen being awarded a majority decision, making him the Shooto Lightweight Champion and first Scandinavian person to hold a MMA world title. Hansen's first title defense was against another undefeated fighter in Vítor Ribeiro who took away Hansen's title by submitting him two minutes into the second round.

=== Pride Fighting championships ===
Hansen went on to win his next seven fights, most notably against Gesias Calvancanti, Caol Uno, Masakazu Imanari and Yves Edwards, before losing a decision to Hayato Sakurai in the semi-finals of the Pride 2005 Lightweight tournament. He then challenged Tatsuya Kawajiri for the Shooto Welterweight Championship, but lost by disqualification due to a kick to the groin of Kawajiri. Hansen then went 2–2 in his next four fights, losing to Shinya Aoki and Eiji Mitsuoka, before his next big win against Kazuyuki Miyata at K-1 Premium 2007 Dynamite!!.

=== Dream ===
On 15 March 2008 Hansen entered Dream's 16-man 2008 Lightweight Grand-Prix tournament. In the first round of the tournament he faced and defeated Japanese fighter Kotetsu Boku by unanimous decision at Dream 1. The win set him up for a quarterfinal bout against Eddie Alvarez, at Dream 3. Hansen and Alvarez were given a standing ovation for their "outstanding fights" by the entire crowd after their match. After a close fight Alvarez was awarded a unanimous decision and advanced to the Dream 5: Lightweight Grand Prix 2008 Final Round. The fight was described by MMAWeekly as "a fifteen-minute war" and that it would be a "fight of the year candidate", while Sherdog called it a "riveting 15-minute war" and an "epic battle".

At Dream 5 Hansen defeated Kultar Gill in a reserve bout for the tournament. This became Hansen's ticket to the final after Alvarez, who went on to defeat Tatsuya Kawajiri in the semi-final, but was forced to withdraw due to a cut under his right eye. In the final, Hansen faced Japanese submission-specialist Shinya Aoki, who had previously defeated Hansen at Pride Shockwave 2006. In the fight Aoki used his grappling experience to try and submit Hansen after taking him down, but the Norwegian escaped and responded with powerful ground-and-pound which hurt Aoki and eventually forced the referee to step in. The win made Hansen the 2008 Dream Lightweight Grand Prix Champion and the first ever Dream Lightweight Champion. After the bout Hansen told the crowd he wanted his first title defense to be against Eddie Alvarez whom he replaced, and who had previously eliminated him from the tournament.

Hansen's next fight was set to be against Gesias Calvancante at Dynamite!! 2008 on 31 December 2008, but the bout was canceled the day of the event due to Hansen not passing pre-fight medicals and subsequently being hospitalized for a "head injury". It was later clarified that the injury stemmed from a teammate landing awkwardly on Hansen's head after a takedown during warm-up, resulting with Hansen being rushed to the hospital where he was diagnosed with a concussion. In February 2009 Hansen was reported as being healthy and was in negotiations with Dream about his first title defense. His first title defense was on 6 October 2009 when he lost the title to Shinya Aoki.

Hansen faced Bibiano Fernandes on 22 March 2010 at Dream 13 for the Dream Featherweight Championship. He lost the match in a split decision.

Hansen lost to Hiroyuki Takaya on 29 May 2010 at Dream 14 by Knockout

Hansen defeated Hideo Tokoro on 25 September at Dream 16 with a Submission (Triangle Choke) 2:48 in the first round.

Returning to Scandinavia, Hansen fought Usama Aziz at Superior Challenge 6 29 October 2010. Hansen defeated Aziz 3:47 in the second round by submission.

Hansen fought Mitsuhiro Ishida on 29 May 2011 at Dream: Fight for Japan!. Hansen won via split decision.

Hansen faced Tatsuya Kawajiri in a featherweight bout at Dream 17 at Saitama Super Arena in Saitama, Japan, on 24 Sept. He lost the fight via submission in the third round.

Despite having an almost two-year hiatus, Hansen then faced Doo Won Seo (on a six fight winning streak) at ROAD FC 11 in Seo's backyard Seoul, South Korea. in which he defeated Seo via submission (arm triangle choke) at 2:24 into the second round.

== Kickboxing career ==
Hansen debuted as a professional kickboxer at the Shoot Boxing World Tournament 2012 in Tokyo, Japan on 17 November 2012. The Shoot Boxing World Tournament, or "S-Cup", is an eight-man, 70 kg standing vale tudo tournament that combines striking, throws and submissions held by the Shoot Boxing Association once every two years. He was drawn against Hiroaki Suzuki at the quarter-final stage and lost by unanimous decision after an extension round.

In his sophomore apprearence as a shootboxer, Hansen gained his first win as he took a unanimous decision victory over Kenji Kanai at Shoot Boxing 2013 - Act 1 in Tokyo on 22 February 2013.

== Personal life ==
Hansen has various tattoos. The tattoo on his right arm is an odal rune and it stands for spiritual heritage. The tattoo on his left arm is Viking art mixed with Celtic art. This relates to his bloodline as his grandmother is a descendant of a Scottish clan. On the inside of his left arm is Thor's hammer. Hansen enjoys heavy metal music and playing the guitar. Hansen retired from MMA in December 2016. In a Facebook message from his then manager Aron Jahnsen, Hansen suffered a stroke and despite later being offered a fight for a European organization, he reportedly turned it down.

== Championships and accomplishments ==
=== Martial arts ===
Brazilian Jiu-Jitsu

- 2nd place in European Cup (1999), 74 kg (163 lb) advanced division.
- 1st place in Finnish Open (1999), 75 kg (165 lb) division
- 3rd place in European Cup (1999), 80 kg (176 lb) division
- Did not place in BJJ Munidals (2000)
- 2nd place in BJJ Open in London (2001), 73 kg (161 lb) blue belt division.
- 3rd place in BJJ Open in London (2001), absolute/open weight blue/purple belt division.

Submission grappling

- 2nd place in Helsinki Submission Wrestling (1999), 65 kg (143 lb) division.
- 1st place in Finnish Open (1999), 70 kg (154 lb) division.
- 1st place in Finnish Open (2000), 70 kg (154 lb) division.
- 1st place in Scandinavian Open (2000), 76 kg (167 lb) division.
- 1st place in Bad Boy Cup (2000), 70 kg (154 lb) division.
- 1st place in Finnish Open (2001), 79 kg (174 lb) division.
- 1st place in Frank Shamrock Invitational (2001), 70 kg (154 lb) division.
- 1st place in King of the Beach (2001), 78 kg (172 lb) division.
- 1st place in Scandinavian Open (2002), 73 kg (161 lb) division.
- Scandinavia Wrestling Submission Wrestling Champion (1999 and 2000).

=== Mixed martial arts ===
- DREAM
  - DREAM Lightweight Championship (1 time, first)
  - 2008 DREAM Lightweight Grand Prix Champion
- Professional Shooto Japan
  - Shooto Welterweight Champion (1 time)
- MMA Fighting
  - 2008 Fight of the Year vs. Eddie Alvarez at Dream 3
- Rear Naked News
  - 2008 Fight of the Year vs. Eddie Alvarez at Dream 3
- FIGHT! Magazine
  - 2008 Fight of the Year vs. Eddie Alvarez at Dream 3
- Inside MMA
  - 2008 Fight of the Year Bazzie Award vs. Eddie Alvarez at Dream 3

== Kickboxing record ==
Kickboxing record
1 win (0 KOs), 1 loss, 0 draws
Date	Result	Opponent	Event	Location	Method	Round	Time	Record
2013-02-22	Win	(Japan) Kenji Kanai	Shoot Boxing 2013 - Act 1	Tokyo, Japan	Decision (unanimous)	3	3:00	1-1
2012-11-17	Loss	(Japan) Hiroaki Suzuki	Shoot Boxing World Tournament 2012, Quarter Finals	Tokyo, Japan	Extension round decision (unanimous)	4	3:00	0-1
Legend: Win Loss Draw/No contest Notes

== Mixed martial arts record ==
Professional record breakdown
38 matches	23 wins	14 losses
By knockout	7	3
By submission	8	5
By decision	8	5
By disqualification	0	1
Draws	1	

Res.	Record	Opponent	Method	Event	Date	Round	Time	Location	Notes
Loss	23–14–1	Tsuneo Kimura	Decision (unanimous)	Shooto: Fight Collection in Okinawa	27 March 2016	3	5:00	Okinawa, Japan	
Loss	23–13–1	Diego Nunes	KO (punch)	Superior Challenge 11	29 November 2014	2	1:51	Södertälje, Sweden	For Superior Challenge Featherweight Championship
Loss	23–12–1	Doo Won Seo	KO (punches)	ROAD FC 15	31 May 2014	1	0:15	Wonju, South Korea	
Win	23–11–1	Doo Won Seo	Submission (arm-triangle choke)	ROAD FC 11	13 April 2013	2	3:14	Seoul, South Korea	
Loss	22–11–1	Tatsuya Kawajiri	Submission (arm-triangle choke)	Dream 17	24 September 2011	3	2:30	Saitama, Japan	
Win	22–10–1	Mitsuhiro Ishida	Decision (split)	Dream: Fight for Japan!	29 May 2011	2	5:00	Saitama, Japan	
Win	21–10–1	Sami Aziz	Submission (armbar)	Super Challenge 6	29 October 2010	2	3:47	Stockholm, Sweden	
Win	20–10–1	Hideo Tokoro	Submission (triangle choke)	DREAM 16	25 September 2010	1	2:48	Nagoya, Japan	
Loss	19–10–1	Hiroyuki Takaya	KO (punches)	DREAM 14	29 May 2010	1	4:27	Saitama, Japan	
Loss	19–9–1	Bibiano Fernandes	Decision (split)	DREAM 13	22 March 2010	2	5:00	Yokohama, Japan	For the DREAM Featherweight Championship.
Loss	19–8–1	Shinya Aoki	Submission (armbar)	DREAM 11	6 October 2009	2	4:56	Yokohama, Japan	Lost DREAM Lightweight Championship.
Win	19–7–1	Shinya Aoki	TKO (punches)	Dream 5: Lightweight Grand Prix 2008 Final Round	21 July 2008	1	4:19	Osaka, Japan	DREAM Lightweight Tournament Final; Won DREAM Lightweight Championship.
Win	18–7–1	Kultar Gill	Submission (armbar)	Dream 5: Lightweight Grand Prix 2008 Final Round	21 July 2008	1	2:33	Osaka, Japan	DREAM Lightweight Tournament Reserve bout.
Loss	17–7–1	Eddie Alvarez	Decision (unanimous)	Dream 3: Lightweight Grand Prix 2008 Second Round	11 May 2008	2	5:00	Saitama, Saitama, Japan	DREAM Lightweight Tournament Quarterfinal.
Win	17–6–1	Kotetsu Boku	Decision (unanimous)	Dream 1: Lightweight Grand Prix 2008 First Round	15 March 2008	2	5:00	Saitama, Saitama, Japan	DREAM Lightweight Tournament Opening round.
Win	16–6–1	Kazuyuki Miyata	Submission (rear-naked choke)	Dynamite!! 2007	31 December 2007	2	1:33	Osaka, Japan	
Loss	15–6–1	Eiji Mitsuoka	Decision (majority)	Shooto: Back To Our Roots 6	8 November 2007	3	5:00	Tokyo, Japan	
Win	15–5–1	Jason Ireland	Submission (armbar)	Pride 33 - The Second Coming	24 February 2007	3	2:33	Las Vegas, Nevada, United States	
Loss	14–5–1	Shinya Aoki	Submission (gogoplata)	Pride Shockwave 2006	31 December 2006	1	2:24	Saitama, Japan	
Win	14–4–1	Luiz Azeredo	KO (knee)	Pride - Bushido 10	2 April 2006	1	7:09	Tokyo, Japan	
Loss	13–4–1	Tatsuya Kawajiri	DQ (kick to groin)	Shooto: The Victory of the Truth	17 February 2006	1	0:08	Tokyo, Japan	For the Shooto Welterweight (154 lb) Title.
Loss	13–3–1	Hayato Sakurai	Decision (unanimous)	Pride: Bushido 9	25 September 2005	2	5:00	Tokyo, Japan	Semifinal of Pride Lightweight Grandprix.
Win	13–2–1	Yves Edwards	Decision (split)	Pride: Bushido 9	25 September 2005	2	5:00	Tokyo, Japan	Opening Round of Pride Lightweight Grandprix.
Win	12–2–1	Kenichiro Togashi	Decision (unanimous)	Shooto: Alive Road	20 August 2005	3	5:00	Yokohama, Japan	
Win	11–2–1	Masakazu Imanari	KO (knee)	Pride: Bushido 8	17 July 2005	1	2:34	Nagoya, Japan	
Win	10–2–1	Caol Uno	KO (knee)	K-1 - Hero's 1	26 March 2005	3	4:48	Saitama, Japan	
Win	9–2–1	Sergey Golyaev	Submission (rear-naked choke)	Euphoria – Road to the Titles	15 October 2004	1	3:24	Atlantic City, New Jersey, United States	
Win	8–2–1	Gesias Cavalcante	Decision (majority)	Shooto: 7/16 in Korakuen Hall	16 July 2004	3	5:00	Tokyo, Japan	
Win	7–2–1	Metin Yakut	TKO (punches)	Shooto Finland: Capital Punishment 2	5 April 2004	2	3:50	Helsinki, Finland	
Loss	6–2–1	Vítor Ribeiro	Submission (arm-triangle choke)	Shooto - Year End Show 2003	14 December 2003	2	2:37	Chiba, Chiba, Japan	Lost Shooto Welterweight (154 lb) Title.
Win	6–1–1	Takanori Gomi	Decision (majority)	Shooto - 8/10 in Yokohama Cultural Gymnasium	10 August 2003	3	5:00	Yokohama, Japan	Won Shooto Welterweight (154 lb) Title.
Win	5–1–1	Rumina Sato	TKO (punches)	Shooto - 3/18 in Korakuen Hall	18 March 2003	1	2:09	Tokyo, Japan	
Win	4–1–1	Takumi Nakayama	Decision (majority)	Shooto: Year End Show 2002	14 December 2002	3	5:00	Chiba, Japan	
Win	3–1–1	Sami Hyyppa	Submission	Shooto Finland: The First Time	19 October 2002	1	4:00	Turku, Finland	
Draw	2–1–1	Rafles la Rose	Draw	CW 3	31 August 2002	2	5:00	Galway, Ireland	
Win	2–1	Olof Inger	Decision	Finnfight 5	24 November 2001	N/A	N/A	Turku, Finland	
Loss	1–1	Jani Lax	Submission (rear-naked choke)	Finnfight 4	2 December 2000	1	9:25	Turku, Finland	
Win	1–0	Marcus Peltonen	TKO	Finnfight 3	6 November 1999	1	1:38	Turku, Finland	

== See also ==
- List of male mixed martial artists

New championship	1st Dream Lightweight Champion; 21 July 2008 – 6 October 2009	Succeeded by Shinya Aoki
