= Eddie Alvarez =

American mixed martial artist

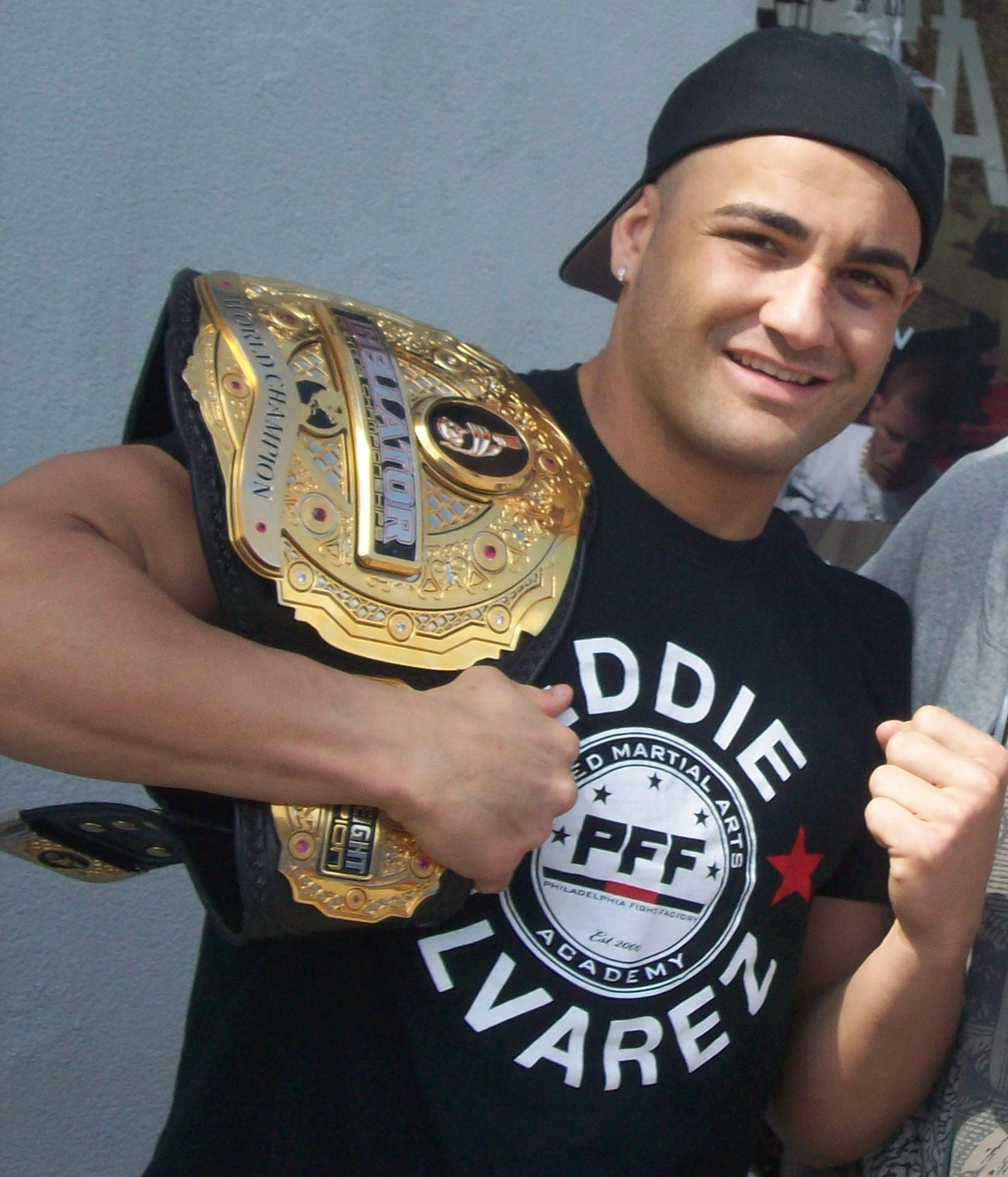
- Alvarez in 2011
- Born: Edward Alvarez; January 11, 1984 (age 42); Philadelphia, Pennsylvania, U.S.
- Nickname: The Underground King
- Height: 5 ft 9 in (175 cm)
- Weight: 170 lb (77 kg; 12 st 2 lb)
- Division: Lightweight (2007–2018); Welterweight (2003–2007, 2018–present) (Note: ONE Championship refers to their 170 lb class as Lightweight, but under the Association of Boxing Commissions in the United States, 170 lbs is considered Welterweight.)
- Reach: 71 in (180 cm)
- Stance: Orthodox
- Fighting out of: Philadelphia, Pennsylvania, United States
- Team: Ricardo Almeida BJJ; Nick Catone MMA; Blackzilians (formerly)
- Trainer: Boxing: Mark Henry; Catch wrestling: Neil Melanson; Grappling: Ricardo Almeida
- Rank: Black belt in Brazilian Jiu-Jitsu under Ricardo Almeida
- Years active: 2003–present

Mixed martial arts record
- Total: 40
- Wins: 30
- By knockout: 17
- By submission: 7
- By decision: 6
- Losses: 8
- By knockout: 4
- By submission: 2
- By decision: 2
- No contests: 2

Other information
- Notable school: Northeast Catholic High School
- Mixed martial arts record from Sherdog

Edward Alvarez (born January 11, 1984) is an American professional mixed martial artist and bare-knuckle boxer who most recently competed in the Welterweight division of BKFC. He formerly competed in the Lightweight divisions of the UFC and Bellator MMA, where he was the UFC Lightweight Champion, and the inaugural and two-time Bellator Lightweight Champion. He also competed for the Japanese DREAM promotion, where he fought in their inaugural Lightweight Grand Prix, along with fighting in ONE FC, where he competed in their 2019 Lightweight World Grand Prix. Alvarez has also competed in EliteXC.

Alvarez is the first fighter to have won championships in both Bellator MMA and the UFC. He holds notable wins over former world champions Pat Curran, Michael Chandler, Shinya Aoki, Gilbert Melendez, Justin Gaethje, Anthony Pettis, Eduard Folayang, Patricky Freire and Rafael dos Anjos. Fight Matrix ranks him #4 All-Time Lightweight in the world (behind Khabib Nurmagomedov, Islam Makhachev, and B.J. Penn).

== Early life ==
Edward Alvarez was born on January 11, 1984, in Philadelphia, Pennsylvania, to Louis and Lillian Alvarez. He is of Puerto Rican and Irish descent. He started boxing at Front Street Gym at the age of eight under his father and Frank Kubach. At the age of 11, Alvarez started wrestling in a youth wrestling program.

He went to Northeast Catholic High School, excelling and becoming a varsity letterman in football, wrestling and track. Despite receiving partial scholarship offers to wrestle in various colleges after graduating in 2001, he decided to pursue a career in mixed martial arts.

Alvarez has a younger brother, Albert, who is a former mixed martial artist.

== Mixed martial arts career ==
Alvarez claims to have fought over 100 unsanctioned bouts before starting as a professional fighter as there were no amateur fights available. He paid $250 for a slot in Ring of Combat 5 to start his professional mixed martial arts career in 2003.

Alvarez won the MFC Welterweight Championship in his seventh professional fight in June 2006, when he defeated Derrick Noble via KO at 1:01 of the first round. The MFC Welterweight Championship would later be re-branded the BodogFIGHT Welterweight Championship.

In spite of the fact that many insiders did not consider 170 pounds to be Alvarez's best competitive fighting weight, he continued to fight larger opponents, as he relished testing his mettle against bigger fighters. At Bodog Fight's "Clash of the Nations" pay per view in Russia on April 14, 2007, Alvarez's size disadvantage would be exposed, as he suffered his first career loss when he was TKO'd by UFC veteran Nick Thompson at 4:32 into round 2. After deciding to leave Bodog, Alvarez signed with EliteXC. He competed in their 160-pound division against Ross Ebanez, winning by TKO.

A few weeks prior to the first event, it was announced that the Japanese promotion DREAM, started by the minds behind PRIDE FC and K-1 had signed Alvarez to compete in their 154-pound grand prix.

His first fight was against Andre Amade, who hailed from the Chute Boxe Academy. Alvarez won via TKO due to strikes late in the first round.

Alvarez advanced to the second round of the tournament, where he defeated top-ranked Lightweight fighter Joachim Hansen on May 11, 2008, by unanimous decision.

In his fight at the Dream 5: Lightweight Grand Prix 2008 Final Round, Alvarez knocked out top-ranked Lightweight fighter Tatsuya Kawajiri in the tournament's semi-finals. The fight was awarded Fight of the Year by Sherdog for 2008. However, he was unable to advance in the tournament due to a cut and severe swelling under his right eye. Alvarez's replacement was Joachim Hansen, whom he defeated two months earlier. Hansen went on to win the tournament and capture the DREAM lightweight title.

Alvarez was scheduled to face UFC and PRIDE veteran Nick Diaz for the EliteXC 160 pound title on November 8, 2008. However, the fight was canceled when EliteXC's parent ProElite filed for bankruptcy. On New Year's Eve 2008, Alvarez fought Shinya Aoki at K-1 Dynamite!! 2008, losing by submission in the first round. He was subsequently signed to an exclusive contract with Bellator Fighting Championships.

=== Bellator Fighting Championships ===
Alvarez entered Bellator's lightweight tournament at Bellator's inaugural event on April 3, 2009. He fought Northern Irishman Greg Loughran, whom he submitted with a guillotine choke. His next fight at the tournament's semi-finals took place four weeks later at Bellator 5, against Eric Reynolds. After controlling the bout for two rounds, Alvarez used a rear-naked choke to submit Reynolds in the third.

Alvarez advanced to the lightweight tournament's finals, which took place at Bellator 12 on June 19, 2009. He fought and defeated Toby Imada, via a rear naked choke submission early in the second round, to become Bellator's first ever lightweight champion.

Alvarez faced Josh Neer in a non-title "Super fight" on May 6, 2010, at Bellator 17, in which he defeated Neer via rear-naked choke at 2:08 of round 2.

Alvarez was supposed to fight the Season 2 Lightweight Tournament Winner Pat Curran in a defense of his title, but his opponent was pulled from the card due to an injury in his right shoulder. He instead faced Roger Huerta at Bellator 33 held in his hometown of Philadelphia, Pennsylvania. He won the fight via TKO (doctor stoppage) between the 2nd and 3rd rounds. Alvarez then publicly stated that he wanted his next fight to be against the Strikeforce Lightweight Champion, Gilbert Melendez.

Alvarez defeated Pat Curran on April 2, 2011, via unanimous decision (49–46, 50–45, 50–45) to retain the Bellator Lightweight Championship at Bellator 39.

Alvarez faced Michael Chandler on November 19, 2011, at Bellator 58 in what was called by many publications as the '2011 Fight of the Year'. He was defeated by Chandler by rear naked choke in the fourth round. Chandler came in very aggressive in the first round, nearly finishing Alvarez.

Alvarez faced Shinya Aoki in a rematch at Bellator 66. He won the fight via TKO in the first round.

Alvarez faced Patricky Freire at Bellator 76, and defeated Freire in the first round via KO. This was the last fight on Alvarez's contract with Bellator and he passed the organization's contractual period of exclusive negotiation. Alvarez agreed in principle to signing with the UFC, reportedly including a share of pay-per-view revenue in addition to show and win money. Bellator, however, invoked a clause in the original contract to match the UFC's offer and re-sign Alvarez, matching the show and win purse and alleging that the pay-per-view cut in the UFC's offer to be strictly hypothetical. Alvarez and his management subsequently filed two lawsuits against Bellator.

On August 13, 2013, it was announced that Alvarez and Bellator had reached an agreement regarding his contract status. Alvarez faced Michael Chandler on November 2, 2013, at Bellator 106. He won via split decision in a close fight to become the Bellator Lightweight Champion for the second time. Much like the first time they met, Alvarez and Chandler engaged in another highly praised, back and forth battle. In the early rounds, Alvarez's jab and punching combinations found their home, damaging the left eye of Chandler, while Chandler was able to land multiple take down attempts and slams, and threatened a rear naked choke. The third round saw Eddie land with some crisp combinations. In the fourth round, Chandler landed a flying knee and some brutal ground and pound which hurt Eddie. By the fifth round, both fighters were busted up and bleeding badly. Chandler caught Alvarez in a neck crank, but Alvarez escaped and nearly finished the fight two times with rear-naked choke attempts. Bellator CEO Bjorn Rebney called the fight the best he'd ever seen. The decision was not without some controversy, with several media outlets scoring the fight for Chandler.

Rebney stated in the post fight press conference that the two would meet again in a rubber match, possibly on pay-per-view, once they both have recuperated. A third fight with Michael Chandler was set up for the main event of Bellator 120 on May 17, 2014. However, a week before the fight, it was announced that Alvarez had suffered a concussion and was forced to pull out of the fight.

In August 2014, new Bellator MMA president Scott Coker announced that Alvarez had been released from his contract with the promotion.

=== Ultimate Fighting Championship ===
On August 19, 2014, the UFC announced that they had signed Alvarez to a contract. He made his promotional debut against fan favorite and top contender Donald Cerrone in the co-main event at UFC 178 on September 27, 2014. Despite absorbing several flurries of clinch strikes from Alvarez through the first round, Cerrone recovered from a slow start and ended up controlling the rest of the fight with leg kicks that eventually hurt Alvarez. Alvarez lost the fight via a unanimous decision.

Alvarez was expected to face Benson Henderson on January 18, 2015, at UFC Fight Night 59. However, Alvarez pulled out of the bout and was replaced by Donald Cerrone.

Alvarez faced Gilbert Melendez on June 13, 2015, at UFC 188. Alvarez won the fight by split decision.

Alvarez faced Anthony Pettis on January 17, 2016, at UFC Fight Night 81. Despite being a heavy underdog going into the fight Alvarez was able to pressure and control Pettis. Alvarez won the fight by split decision.

==== UFC Lightweight Champion ====
In his fourth UFC fight, Alvarez faced Rafael dos Anjos on July 7, 2016, at UFC Fight Night 90 for the UFC Lightweight Championship. Despite being a three-to-one underdog going into the fight, Alvarez found his range early and rocked dos Anjos with a right hand just past the halfway point of the first round. He then swarmed dos Anjos and landed a barrage of unanswered punches before the fight was stopped via TKO. The win also earned Alvarez his first Performance of the Night bonus award.

Alvarez made his first title defense against the then UFC Featherweight Champion Conor McGregor on November 12, 2016, at UFC 205 in Madison Square Garden in New York City. It was a historic event for the UFC as it was the first UFC event in New York since the lifting of the state's long-standing ban on MMA. He lost the fight via TKO in the second round, after being outstruck in the first round.

==== Post-championship ====
In his first fight after losing the Lightweight title, Alvarez faced Dustin Poirier on May 13, 2017, at UFC 211. Poirier rocked Alvarez in the second round, but was subsequently dropped when Alvarez landed two illegal knees while Poirier was against the fence. With the Texas commission not operating under the new unified rules, referee Herb Dean declared the fight a No Contest as he did not believe Alvarez knew Poirier was a grounded opponent at the time.

In July 2017, it was announced that Alvarez would be a coach on The Ultimate Fighter 26 against former WSOF Lightweight Champion Justin Gaethje. A bout with Gaethje took place on December 2, 2017, at UFC 218. Alvarez won the fight via knockout in the third round. The fight earned both participants the Fight of the Night bonus award.

In the last fight of his UFC contract, Alvarez faced Dustin Poirier on July 28, 2018, in a rematch in the main event at UFC on Fox 30. He lost the fight via TKO in the second round.

=== ONE Championship ===
On October 15, 2018, it was announced that Alvarez signed with ONE Championship, set to make his promotional debut some time in early 2019 as part of their Lightweight division.

On November 7, 2018, it was announced that Alvarez would be one of eight participants in the ONE Lightweight World Grand Prix. On December 19, 2018, it was announced that Alvarez faced Timofey Nastyukhin at ONE Championship: A New Era on March 31, 2019, in promotion's inaugural event in Japan. He lost the fight by TKO in the first round.

Alvarez returned at ONE Championship: Dawn of Heroes on August 2, 2019, against former ONE lightweight champion Eduard Folayang. He won the fight via first round rear-naked choke after being dropped by a leg kick early in the round.

Alvarez was expected to face Saygid Arslaniev in the ONE Lightweight World Grand Prix final, but on September 26, 2019, news surfaced that he had to withdraw from the bout due to an injury. He was replaced by ONE Lightweight Champion Christian Lee. The bout with Arslaniev was to be rebooked for ONE Infinity 2 on June 26, 2020, but canceled due to the Impact of the COVID-19 pandemic on sports.

Alvarez faced former ONE lightweight title challenger Iuri Lapicus at ONE on TNT 1 on April 7, 2021. The event took place in Singapore and aired in a primetime slot in the United States on TNT. He was disqualified after repeatedly throwing punches to the back of Lapicus's head. The call to disqualify Alvarez was considered controversial by multiple outlets and professional fighters as it appeared he was striking Lapicus's ear before Lapicus started turning his head. Alvarez appealed the final decision and the result was later overturned to a no contest.

Three weeks after his last bout, Alvarez faced Ok Rae Yoon at ONE on TNT 4 on April 28, 2021. He lost a close bout via unanimous decision.

On September 21, 2022, it was announced that Alvarez had agreed to be released from his contract with ONE Championship.

== Bare-knuckle boxing career ==
=== Bare Knuckle Fighting Championship ===
On March 1, 2023, it was announced by BKFC president Dave Feldman that Alvarez had signed with Bare Knuckle Fighting Championship. He made his debut against Chad Mendes at BKFC 41 on April 29, 2023, and won by split decision. This fight earned him the Fight of the Night award.

Alvarez faced Mike Perry on December 2, 2023, at BKFC 56 for the symbolic "King of Violence" championship and lost by corner stoppage after the second round.

Alvarez faced Jeremy Stephens at BKFC Knucklemania 5 on January 25, 2025. He lost the fight by technical knockout via corner stoppage at the end of the third round.

== Personal life ==
Alvarez married his high school sweetheart, Jamie, in 2008. They have three sons and a daughter. Alvarez utilized his financial success to move his family out of Kensington and into Southampton, PA following the birth of his first son.

Alvarez made two appearances on the television show Bully Beatdown on MTV, where he knocked out both of his opponents.

== Championships and accomplishments ==
=== Amateur wrestling ===
- National Prep School Wrestling Championships
  - National Prep All-American (2000, 2001)

=== Mixed martial arts ===
- Ultimate Fighting Championship
  - UFC Lightweight Championship (One time)
  - Performance of the Night (One time) vs. Rafael dos Anjos
  - Fight of the Night (One time) vs. Justin Gaethje
  - Holds wins over three former UFC champions — vs. Anthony Pettis, Rafael dos Anjos and Justin Gaethje
  - UFC.com Awards
    - 2017: Ranked #2 Fight of the Year vs. Justin Gaethje
- Bellator Fighting Championships
  - Bellator Lightweight World Championship (Two times; First)
    - One successful title defense
  - Bellator Season 1 Lightweight Tournament Winner
- BodogFIGHT
  - BodogFIGHT Welterweight Championship (One time; First)
- Mixed Fighting Championships
  - MFC Welterweight Championship (One time; First; Last; Only)
- Reality Fighting
  - Reality Fighting Welterweight Championship (One time; First)
- MMA Fighting
  - 2008 Fight of the Year vs. Joachim Hansen at Dream 3
- FIGHT! Magazine
  - 2008 Fight of the Year vs. Joachim Hansen at Dream 3
- Inside MMA
  - 2008 Fight of the Year Bazzie Award vs. Joachim Hansen at Dream 3
- Fight Booth
  - 2012 King of Violence Award
- Fight Matrix
  - Lineal MMA Lightweight Championship (Two times)
- Sherdog
  - 2008 Fight of the Year vs. Tatsuya Kawajiri on July 21
- Sports Illustrated
  - 2008 Round of the Year Round 1 vs. Tatsuya Kawajiri on July 21
- Yahoo! Sports
  - 2011 Fight of the Year vs. Michael Chandler on November 19
- MMADNA.nl
  - 2017 Fight of the Year vs. Justin Gaethje
- World MMA Awards
  - 2015 Comeback of the Year vs. Gilbert Melendez at UFC 188
  - 2017 Fight of the Year vs. Justin Gaethje at UFC 218
- MMA HQ
  - 2008 #3 Ranked Fighter of the Year
- Rear Naked News
  - 2008 Fight of the Year vs. Joachim Hansen at Dream 3
- MMA Junkie
  - 2017 #3 Ranked Fight of the Year vs. Justin Gaethje at UFC 218

=== Bare-knuckle boxing ===
- Bare Knuckle Fighting Championship
  - Fight of the Night (One time) vs. Chad Mendes
  - Fight of the Year (2023) (vs. Chad Mendes)

== Mixed martial arts record ==
Professional record breakdown
40 matches	30 wins	8 losses
By knockout	17	4
By submission	7	2
By decision	6	2
No contests	2	

Res.	Record	Opponent	Method	Event	Date	Round	Time	Location	Notes
Loss	30–8 (2)	Ok Rae-yoon	Decision (unanimous)	ONE on TNT 4	April 28, 2021	3	5:00	Kallang, Singapore	
NC	30–7 (2)	Iuri Lapicus	NC (overturned)	ONE on TNT 1	April 7, 2021	1	1:02	Kallang, Singapore	Originally ruled a DQ (punches to the back of head) win for Lapicus; overturned to a no contest after Alvarez appealed the decision.
Win	30–7 (1)	Eduard Folayang	Submission (rear-naked choke)	ONE: Dawn of Heroes	August 2, 2019	1	2:16	Pasay, Philippines	ONE Lightweight Grand-Prix Semifinal round. Later withdrew from tournament due to injury.
Loss	29–7 (1)	Timofey Nastyukhin	TKO (punches)	ONE: A New Era	March 31, 2019	1	4:05	Tokyo, Japan	Return to 170 lbs. ONE Lightweight Grand-Prix Quarterfinal round.
Loss	29–6 (1)	Dustin Poirier	TKO (punches)	UFC on Fox: Alvarez vs. Poirier 2	July 28, 2018	2	4:05	Calgary, Alberta, Canada	
Win	29–5 (1)	Justin Gaethje	KO (knee)	UFC 218	December 2, 2017	3	3:59	Detroit, Michigan, United States	Fight of the Night.
NC	28–5 (1)	Dustin Poirier	NC (illegal knees)	UFC 211	May 13, 2017	2	4:12	Dallas, Texas, United States	Alvarez landed illegal knees to the head of Poirier who was a downed opponent.
Loss	28–5	Conor McGregor	TKO (punches)	UFC 205	November 12, 2016	2	3:04	New York City, New York, United States	Lost the UFC Lightweight Championship.
Win	28–4	Rafael dos Anjos	TKO (punches)	UFC Fight Night: dos Anjos vs. Alvarez	July 7, 2016	1	3:49	Las Vegas, Nevada, United States	Won the UFC Lightweight Championship. Performance of the Night.
Win	27–4	Anthony Pettis	Decision (split)	UFC Fight Night: Dillashaw vs. Cruz	January 17, 2016	3	5:00	Boston, Massachusetts, United States	
Win	26–4	Gilbert Melendez	Decision (split)	UFC 188	June 13, 2015	3	5:00	Mexico City, Mexico	Melendez tested positive for performance-enhancing drugs.
Loss	25–4	Donald Cerrone	Decision (unanimous)	UFC 178	September 27, 2014	3	5:00	Las Vegas, Nevada, United States	
Win	25–3	Michael Chandler	Decision (split)	Bellator 106	November 2, 2013	5	5:00	Long Beach, California, United States	Won the Bellator Lightweight World Championship. Later vacated title.
Win	24–3	Patricky Pitbull	KO (head kick)	Bellator 76	October 12, 2012	1	4:54	Windsor, Ontario, Canada	
Win	23–3	Shinya Aoki	TKO (punches)	Bellator 66	April 20, 2012	1	2:14	Cleveland, Ohio, United States	
Loss	22–3	Michael Chandler	Submission (rear-naked choke)	Bellator 58	November 19, 2011	4	3:06	Hollywood, Florida, United States	Lost the Bellator Lightweight World Championship.
Win	22–2	Pat Curran	Decision (unanimous)	Bellator 39	April 2, 2011	5	5:00	Uncasville, Connecticut, United States	Defended the Bellator Lightweight World Championship.
Win	21–2	Roger Huerta	TKO (doctor stoppage)	Bellator 33	October 21, 2010	2	5:00	Philadelphia, Pennsylvania, United States	Non-title bout.
Win	20–2	Josh Neer	Technical Submission (standing rear-naked choke)	Bellator 17	May 6, 2010	2	2:08	Boston, Massachusetts, United States	Catchweight (160 lbs) bout.
Win	19–2	Katsunori Kikuno	Submission (arm-triangle choke)	Dream 12	October 26, 2009	2	3:42	Osaka, Japan	
Win	18–2	Toby Imada	Submission (rear-naked choke)	Bellator 12	June 19, 2009	2	2:34	Hollywood, Florida, United States	Bellator Season One Lightweight Tournament Final. Won the inaugural Bellator Lightweight World Championship.
Win	17–2	Eric Reynolds	Submission (rear-naked choke)	Bellator 5	May 1, 2009	3	1:30	Dayton, Ohio, United States	Bellator Season One Lightweight Tournament Semifinal.
Win	16–2	Greg Loughran	Submission (guillotine choke)	Bellator 1	April 3, 2009	1	2:44	Hollywood, Florida, United States	Bellator Season One Lightweight Tournament Quarterfinal.
Loss	15–2	Shinya Aoki	Submission (heel hook)	Fields Dynamite!! 2008	December 31, 2008	1	1:32	Saitama, Japan	For the WAMMA Lightweight Championship.
Win	15–1	Tatsuya Kawajiri	TKO (punches)	Dream 5: Lightweight Grand Prix 2008 Final Round	July 21, 2008	1	7:35	Osaka, Japan	Dream Lightweight Grand Prix Semifinal. Didn't compete in final round due to an arm injury.
Win	14–1	Joachim Hansen	Decision (unanimous)	Dream 3: Lightweight Grand Prix 2008 Second Round	May 11, 2008	2	5:00	Saitama, Japan	Dream Lightweight Grand Prix Quarterfinal.
Win	13–1	Andre Amade	TKO (punches)	Dream 1: Lightweight Grand Prix 2008 First Round	March 15, 2008	1	6:47	Saitama, Japan	Dream Lightweight Grand Prix Opening Round.
Win	12–1	Ross Ebañez	KO (punches)	ShoXC: Elite Challenger Series	January 25, 2008	2	2:32	Atlantic City, New Jersey, United States	Catchweight (165 lbs) bout.
Win	11–1	Matt Lee	Decision (unanimous)	BodogFight: Alvarez vs. Lee	July 14, 2007	3	5:00	Trenton, New Jersey, United States	
Loss	10–1	Nick Thompson	TKO (punches)	BodogFight: Clash of the Nations	April 14, 2007	2	4:32	Saint Petersburg, Russia	Lost the BodogFIGHT Welterweight Championship.
Win	10–0	Scott Henze	TKO (corner stoppage)	BodogFight: Costa Rica Combat	February 16, 2007	1	4:13	Playa Tambor, Costa Rica	
Win	9–0	Aaron Riley	KO (punches)	BodogFight: USA vs. Russia	December 2, 2006	1	1:05	Vancouver, British Columbia, Canada	Won the MFC Welterweight Championship; Later promoted to BodogFIGHT Welterweight Champion.
Win	8–0	Hidenobu Koike	TKO (punches)	MARS 4: New Deal	August 26, 2006	1	1:26	Tokyo, Japan	
Win	7–0	Derrick Noble	KO (punches)	MFC: Russia vs. USA	June 3, 2006	1	1:01	Atlantic City, New Jersey, United States	
Win	6–0	Daisuke Hanazawa	TKO (punches)	Euphoria: USA vs. Japan	November 5, 2005	1	4:00	Atlantic City, New Jersey, United States	
Win	5–0	Danil Veselov	TKO (punches)	Euphoria: USA vs. Russia	May 14, 2005	2	2:15	Atlantic City, New Jersey, United States	
Win	4–0	Seichi Ikemoto	TKO (punches)	Euphoria: USA vs. The World	February 26, 2005	2	4:25	Atlantic City, New Jersey, United States	
Win	3–0	Chris Schlesinger	Submission (guillotine choke)	Reality Fighting 7	October 16, 2004	1	1:00	Atlantic City, New Jersey, United States	Won the inaugural Reality Fighting Welterweight Championship.
Win	2–0	Adam Fearon	TKO (submission to punches)	Ring of Combat 6	April 24, 2004	1	2:06	Elizabeth, New Jersey, United States	
Win	1–0	Anthony Ladonna	KO (punch)	Ring of Combat 5	December 14, 2003	1	3:57	Elizabeth, New Jersey, United States	

== Pay-per-view bouts ==
No.	Event	Fight	Date	Venue	City	PPV Buys
1.	UFC 205	Alvarez vs. McGregor	November 12, 2016	Madison Square Garden	New York City, New York, United States	1,300,000
2.	BKFC 56	Perry vs. Alvarez	December 2, 2023	Maverik Center	Salt Lake City, Utah	100,000

== Bare knuckle record ==
Professional record breakdown
3 matches	1 win	2 losses
By knockout	0	2
By decision	1	0

Res.	Record	Opponent	Method	Event	Date	Round	Time	Location	Notes
Loss	1–2	Jeremy Stephens	TKO (corner stoppage)	BKFC Knucklemania V	January 25, 2025	3	2:00	Philadelphia, Pennsylvania, United States	
Loss	1–1	Mike Perry	TKO (corner stoppage)	BKFC 56	December 2, 2023	2	2:00	Salt Lake City, Utah, United States	Middleweight debut 175 lbs. For the symbolic King of Violence Championship.
Win	1–0	Chad Mendes	Decision (split)	BKFC 41	April 29, 2023	5	2:00	Broomfield, Colorado, United States	Welterweight debut 165 lbs. Fight of the Night. Fight of the Year.

== See also ==
- List of Bellator MMA alumni
- List of male mixed martial artists

== Notes ==
Awards and achievements
New title	1st Bellator Lightweight Word Champion; June 19, 2009 – November 19, 2011	Succeeded by Michael Chandler
Preceded by Michael Chandler	3rd Bellator Lightweight World Champion; November 2, 2013 – August 19, 2014; Vacated	Vacant Title next held by Will Brooks
Preceded by Rafael dos Anjos	8th UFC Lightweight Champion; July 7 – November 13, 2016	Succeeded by Conor McGregor
