= Dream 5 =

Mixed martial arts event in 2008

DREAM.5: Light Weight Grandprix 2008 Final Round
- The poster for DREAM.5: Light Weight Grandprix 2008 Final Round
- Promotion: DREAM
- Date: July 21, 2008
- Venue: Osaka-jo Hall
- City: Osaka, Japan
- Attendance: 11,986

Event chronology
DREAM.4: Middle Weight Grandprix 2008 2nd Round	DREAM.5: Light Weight Grandprix 2008 Final Round	DREAM.6: Middle Weight Grandprix 2008 Final Round

DREAM.5 Light Weight Grandprix 2008 Final Round was a mixed martial arts event promoted by Fighting and Entertainment Group's mixed martial arts promotion DREAM. The event took place on Monday July 21, 2008 at the Osaka-jo Hall in Osaka, Japan and hosted the final round of the promotion's Lightweight tournament.

The DREAM.5 attracted a crowd of 11,986 to the Osaka Jo Hall and was broadcast live in Japan on the TBS network and SkyPerfect and on HDNet Fights in the United States.

== Results ==
Lightweight Grand Prix Final
Weight class				Method	Round	Time	Notes
Lightweight	Joachim Hansen	def.	Shinya Aoki	TKO (punches)	1	4:19
Main Card
Heavyweight	Alistair Overeem	def.	Mark Hunt	Submission (keylock)	1	1:11
Middleweight	Yoshihiro Akiyama	def.	Katsuyori Shibata	Submission (ezekiel choke)	1	6:34
Featherweight	Hideo Tokoro	def.	Takeshi Yamazaki	Decision (unanimous)	2	5:00
Welterweight	Kuniyoshi Hironaka	def.	Motoki Miyazawa	TKO (doctor stoppage)	1	8:57
Featherweight	Joseph Benavidez	def.	Junya Kodo	Submission (guillotine choke)	1	2:42
Lightweight Grand Prix reserve match
Lightweight	Joachim Hansen	def.	Kultar Gill	Submission (armbar)	1	2:33
Lightweight Grand Prix Semi Final
Lightweight	Eddie Alvarez	def.	Tatsuya Kawajiri	TKO (punches)	1	7:35
Lightweight	Shinya Aoki	def.	Caol Uno	Decision (unanimous)	2	5:00
Undercard
Lightweight	Daisuke Nakamura	def.	Andy Ologun	Submission (flying armbar)	1	3:41

* Hansen replaced Alvarez due to a cut received in his fight with Kawajiri.

== 2008 Lightweight Grand Prix bracket ==
First round
(Japan)	Shinya Aoki	W Dec
(Brazil)	Gesias Calvancanti
(Japan)	Katsuhiko Nagata	W Dec
(Russia)	Artur Oumakhanov
(Japan)	Mitsuhiro Ishida	W Dec
(South Korea)	Jung Bu-Kyung
(Japan)	Caol Uno
13	Bye
(United States)	Eddie Alvarez	W TKO
(Brazil)	Andre "Dida" Amade
(Norway)	Joachim Hansen	W Dec
(Japan)	Koutetsu Boku
(Japan)	Tatsuya Kawajiri	W Dec
(Canada)	Kultar Gill
(Brazil)	Luiz Firmino	W Sub
(Japan)	Kazuyuki Miyata

Quarterfinals
(Japan)	Shinya Aoki	W Sub
(Japan)	Katsuhiko Nagata
(Japan)	Mitsuhiro Ishida
(Japan)	Caol Uno	W Sub
(United States)	Eddie Alvarez	W Dec
(Norway)	Joachim Hansen
(Japan)	Tatsuya Kawajiri	W Dec
(Brazil)	Luiz Firmino

Semifinals
(Japan)	Shinya Aoki	W Dec
(Japan)	Caol Uno
(United States)	Eddie Alvarez	W TKO
(Japan)	Tatsuya Kawajiri

Finals
(Japan)	Shinya Aoki
(Norway)	Joachim Hansen**	W TKO

** Replacement.

Dream Lightweight Grand Prix Reserve Bouts:

(Norway) Joachim Hansen def. (Canada) Kultar Gill at DREAM.5

== Notes ==
- The 8th matchup was initially to be postponed until DREAM.2 due to the injuries of Vítor Ribeiro and Caol Uno along with Gilbert Melendez's prior commitment to Strikeforce. Dream officials decided to directly seed Caol Uno into the 2nd round against Mitsuhiro Ishida as the 8th fighter.
- Nick Diaz was originally scheduled to fight Hayato Sakurai to determine the Dream Welterweight Champion, but Diaz had to pull out due to contractual obligations to EliteXC.
- Mirko "Crocop" Filipovic had been a long rumored participant. Originally scheduled to face Jerome LeBanner, and later Mighty Mo Siligia, Mirko had to pull out due to a recovering shoulder injury and minor impending knee surgery. Mirko expressed interest in fighting at DREAM.6 in September.
- Denis Kang had been another long rumored participant. With one fight left on his FEG contract, Denis Kang would have become an unrestricted free agent at the conclusion of this bout. However, he was pulled from the card late in July for unknown reasons.
- After his bout with Mirko "Crocop" Filipovic was scrapped, Jérôme Le Banner was scheduled to fight Mark Hunt. However, LeBanner had to pull out late due to injury.
- Appearing on the original DREAM.5 banner, Minowaman was pulled from the card to instead fight at Deep: Gladiators.
- The bout between Norifumi "KID" Yamamoto and Joseph Benavidez has been canceled due to a knee injury Yamamoto suffered in training. Yamamoto has been replaced by Junya Kodo.
- Reports indicate Dream.5 scored a 10.0 rating for network TV on the TBS broadcast in Japan. The rating peaked at 13.9 during the Akiyama-Shibata fight.

== See also ==
- Dream (mixed martial arts)
- List of Dream champions
- 2008 in DREAM
