= Dream 17 =

Mixed martial arts event in 2011

- The poster for Dream 17
- Promotion: Dream
- Date: September 24, 2011
- Venue: Saitama Super Arena
- City: Saitama, Japan
- Attendance: 13,200

Event chronology
Dream: Japan GP Final	Dream 17	Dream 18

Dream 17 was a mixed martial arts event held by Fighting and Entertainment Group's mixed martial arts promotion Dream. The event took place on September 24, 2011, at the Saitama Super Arena in Saitama, Japan.

== Background ==
Contrary to previous events, Dream used the card to launch a new rule change: the use of three, five-minute rounds.

This event featured the opening round in Dream's World Bantamweight Grand Prix.

== Results ==
Main card
Weight class				Method	Round	Time	Notes
Open-weight	Ikuhisa Minowa	def	Baru Harn	submission (scarf hold arm-lock and neck crank)	1	4:39
Bantamweight Tournament Quarterfinal	Rodolfo Marques	def	Yusup Saadulaev	unanimous decision	3	5:00
Bantamweight Tournament Quarterfinal	Masakazu Imanari	def	Abel Cullum	submission (armbar)	3	0:46
Bantamweight Tournament Quarterfinal	Bibiano Fernandes	def	Takafumi Otsuka	technical submission (rear naked choke)	1	0:41
Bantamweight Tournament Quarterfinal	Antonio Banuelos	def	Hideo Tokoro	split decision	3	5:00
Middleweight	Gerald Harris	def	Kazuhiro Nakamura	split decision	3	5:00
Lightweight	Satoru Kitaoka	def	Willamy Freire	split decision	3	5:00
Welterweight	Yan Cabral	def	Kazushi Sakuraba	submission (arm triangle choke)	2	2:42
Featherweight	Takeshi Inoue	def	Caol Uno	KO (head kick)	1	4:17
Featherweight	Tatsuya Kawajiri	def	Joachim Hansen	submission (arm triangle choke)	3	2:30
Lightweight	Shinya Aoki	def	Rob McCullough	submission (neck crank)	1	4:57

== World Bantamweight Grand Prix 2011 Bracket ==
Quarterfinals (DREAM 17)
(Japan) Masakazu Imanari	W
(United States) Abel Cullum	SUB
(Japan) Hideo Tokoro	DEC
(United States) Antonio Banuelos	W
(Brazil) Bibiano Fernandes	W
(Japan) Takafumi Otsuka	SUB
(Russia) Yusup Saadulaev	DEC
(Brazil) Rodolfo Marques	W

Semifinals (Fight For Japan: Genki Desu Ka Omisoka 2011)

Final (Fight For Japan: Genki Desu Ka Omisoka 2011)
