= Tatsuya Kawajiri =

Japanese mixed martial arts fighter (born 1978)

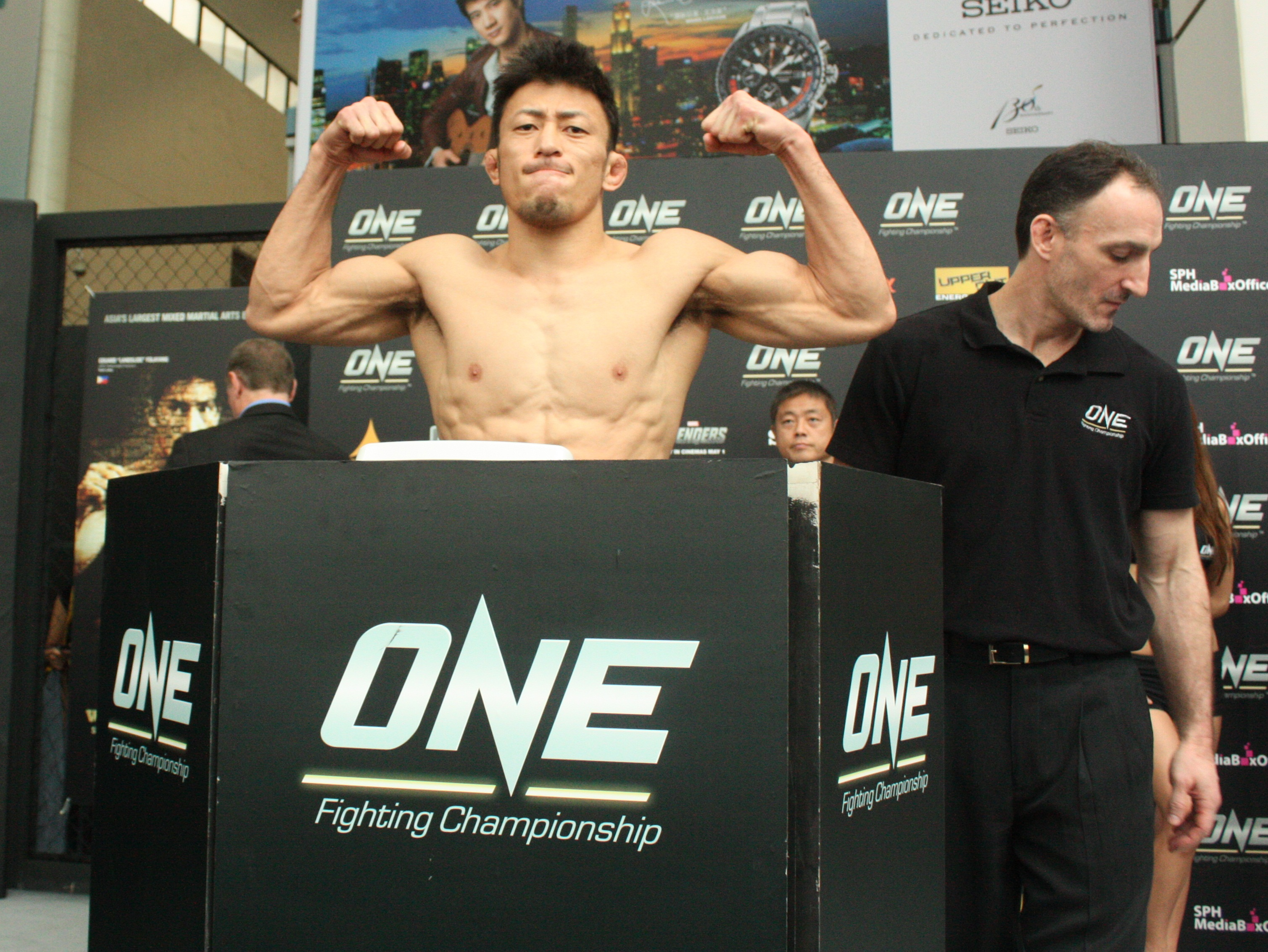
- Born: Tatsuya Kawajiri (川尻達也, Kawajiri Tatsuya); 8 May 1978 (age 48); Inashiki District, Ibaraki, Japan
- Other names: Crusher
- Height: 170 cm (5 ft 7 in)
- Weight: 66 kg (146 lb; 10 st 6 lb)
- Division: Welterweight; Lightweight; Featherweight
- Reach: 69 in (180 cm)
- Style: Kickboxing judo
- Team: T-BLOOD
- Rank: A-Class Shootist
- Years active: 2000-present

Kickboxing record
- Total: 3
- Wins: 2
- By knockout: 1
- Losses: 1
- By knockout: 1

Mixed martial arts record
- Total: 53
- Wins: 37
- By knockout: 12
- By submission: 10
- By decision: 14
- By disqualification: 1
- Losses: 14
- By knockout: 4
- By submission: 4
- By decision: 6
- Draws: 2

Other information
- Mixed martial arts record from Sherdog

Tatsuya Kawajiri (Japanese: 川尻達也, Kawajiri Tatsuya; born May 8, 1978) is a Japanese mixed martial artist who competes in the Bantamweight division. He is a former Shooto Lightweight Champion, and has also competed in the UFC, PRIDE, DREAM, Strikeforce, ONE FC, and Rizin Fighting Federation. Kawajiri also participated in the Yarennoka! event as well as Dynamite!! 2009 and Dynamite!! 2010, representing DREAM in both events.

Kawajiri's fight at PRIDE Bushido 9 with Takanori Gomi was voted as PRIDE Fighting Championship's Fight of the Year for 2005. In the same year, Kawajiri was considered by many mixed martial arts publications to be the #1 Lightweight fighter in the world.

== Background ==
Kawajiri was born in the Inashiki District of Ibaraki Prefecture and competed in baseball from elementary school through middle school before he transitioned into track and field in high school. At the age of 19, Kawajiri viewed the 1997 K-1 World Grand Prix Semifinal match between Ernesto Hoost and Francisco Filho, persuading him to begin training in combat sports. Kawajiri graduated from Chuo Gakuin University.

== Mixed martial arts career ==
=== Shooto ===
Kawajiri's professional career started in Japan's Shooto organization where he lost to Takumi Nakayama via rear-naked choke submission at 2:44 of the first round. After this loss Kawajiri went on to fight Yohei Suzuki to a Draw at Shooto's "Wanna Shooto 2001." He would then remain undefeated in Shooto until a disappointing decision loss to future Shooto Lightweight Champion Vítor Ribeiro in 2002. He would then continue on a new winning streak eventually re-matching Ribeiro to capture the Lightweight Championship at Shooto's 2004 Year-End show.

=== PRIDE FC ===
On May 22, 2005, Kawajiri made his debut in PRIDE and score a quick TKO over In Seok Kim. He went on to score a one-sided victory over Luis Firmino at PRIDE Bushido 8 on July 17, 2005. On 25 September, he entered PRIDE's inaugural Lightweight tournament in hopes of eventually being crowned the first PRIDE Lightweight Champion as well as holding the Shooto Championship at the same time. His first match in the tournament was against superstar Takanori Gomi. Gomi ended up knocking down Kawajiri after a flurry of punches and proceeded to submit him with a rear-naked choke 7:42 into the first round.

=== In between Shooto and PRIDE ===
Kawajiri went back to Shooto to defend his Shooto Lightweight Champion against Norwegian Joachim Hansen. The match was stopped eight seconds into the first round when Hansen was disqualified for kicking Kawajiri in the groin, making Kawajiri the victor. Kawajiri came back to PRIDE in a fight against Charles Bennett whom he submitted by kneebar after 2:30 in the first round. He then made another PRIDE appearance in which he fought Chris Brennan and scored an even quicker victory 29 seconds in the first round by TKO. His next fight was a non-title bout against Per Eklund in Shooto where he scored a TKO at 4:10 into the first round.

Kawajiri return to PRIDE was at PRIDE Shockwave 2006 on New Year's Eve. There he lost a controversial decision to at the time undefeated American fighter and rising star in the Lightweight division, Gilbert Melendez.

On January 23, 2007, Kawajiri relinquished his Shooto title because he could not defend his title by the next Shooto event due to a thumb injury that occurred with his fight against Melendez.

=== Fighting and Entertainment Group ===
In March 2008 Kawajiri entered the DREAM Lightweight Grand Prix, where he has advanced to the semifinals after back to back victories over Kultar Gill, and Brazilian Top Team fighter Luiz Firmino.

At DREAM 5 Kawajiri lost a semi-final match-up to Eddie Alvarez by TKO at 7:35 of the first round. This slugfest with Alvarez saw both men dropping the other repeatedly with punches and the fight was named 2008 Fight of the Year by several MMA outlets, including Sherdog.

On March 5, 2009, at DREAM 7, Kawajiri faced EliteXC veteran Ross Ebañez. Kawajiri won via rear-naked choke submission just over four minutes into the first round.

On May 26, 2009, Kawajiri defeated Gesias Cavalcante via unanimous decision. Kawajiri used his strong wrestling and ground and pound to great effect, and he was also able to frustrate Cavalcante by matching him in the striking game on the feet.

Kawajiri next faced Guam's Melchor Manibusan, who had not fought in several years in a match that was not expected to be competitive for Kawajiri. Indeed, on October 5, 2009, at DREAM 11, Kawajiri overwhelmed his opponent. Kawajiri easily took down his foe after a wild start in which Manibusan rushed Kawajiri with a flurry of punches, then used his trademark ground and pound to force the TKO via strikes at 3:48 of the first round. On December 22, 2009, it was announced that Kawajiri would be taking on Sengoku Lightweight Kazunori Yokota in a Sengoku vs. DREAM fight at the annual Dynamite!! event on New Year's Eve in Saitama, Japan. He went on to defeat Yokota via unanimous decision.

Kawajiri faced Champion Shinya Aoki at DREAM 15 for the Lightweight Championship in a highly anticipated match up as the two are both from PRIDE and were meant to have fought in the now defunct organization. Kawajiri lost via submission at 1:53 into the first round.

Kawajiri faced UFC veteran Drew Fickett at DREAM: Japan GP Final. Kawajiri rebounded from his loss against Strikeforce Champion Gilbert Melendez by pounding out Fickett (TKO). Kawajiri finished Fickett with strikes less than five minutes into the fight.

Kawajiri next fought Joachim Hansen at DREAM 17. He won the fight via submission in the third round.

After finishing two opponents consecutively, Kawajiri faced Kazuyuki Miyata at a tie-in event called Fight For Japan: Genki Desu Ka Omisoka 2011 promoted and presented by M-1 Global, DREAM, and the Inoki Genome Federation that took place on December 31, 2011, at the Saitama Super Arena in Saitama, Japan. Kawajiri defeated Miyata via submission (arm triangle choke) at 4:54 of the second round. This now making it three straight victories in a finishing fashion.

While still having something of a "joint-contract" with the DREAM organization, with his next bout being at DREAM 18 on December 31, 2012, he faced long time World Victory Road and UFC veteran Michihiro Omigawa. Kawajiri defeated Omigawa via unanimous decision. This started Kawajiri's longest win streak since mid-2005.

=== K-1 ===
Kawajiri fought K-1 veteran Kozo Takeda at Dynamite!! 2008 winning by 1st-round KO. His next K-1 fight was at K-1 World Max 2009 Final 8 against Masato who defeated Kawajiri by TKO at 1:43 in the second round.

=== Dynamite!! 2010 ===
At Dynamite!! Kawajiri returned to form against former Strikeforce Lightweight Champion Josh Thomson, repeatedly taking him down and unleashing ground and pound, winning a clear unanimous decision.

=== Strikeforce ===
A rematch between Kawajiri and Strikeforce Lightweight Champion Gilbert Melendez took place on April 9, 2011, at Strikeforce 33. Kawajiri lost the fight via TKO in the first round.

=== ONE Fighting Championship ===
In 2012, after long stints with Japanese MMA organizations and more specifically DREAM, Pride Fighting Championships, he signed a contract to an up-and-coming Vale Tudo, incorporated with Unified Rules, organization named ONE Fighting Championship - much like Pride - with its intent to revive that aspect of mixed martial arts, based out of Kallang, Singapore.

Kawajiri's debut bout was with the ONE FC organization on March 31, 2012, in the event ONE Fighting Championship: War of the Lions against Donald Sanchez, in which he added to his winning streak by defeating Sanchez via submission (triangle choke) at 3:27 of the first round.

=== Ultimate Fighting Championship ===
On October 22, 2013, it was announced that Kawajiri has signed with the UFC. Kawajiri was expected to face Hacran Dias on January 4, 2014, at UFC Fight Night 34, however, Dias pulled out of the bout citing an injury. Kawajiri eventually faced promotional newcomer Sean Soriano at the event. He won the fight via technical submission in the second round.

Kawajiri faced Clay Guida at UFC Fight Night 39. He lost the fight by unanimous decision in a performance that earned both participants Fight of the Night honors.

Kawajiri was briefly linked to a matchup with Darren Elkins on September 20, 2014, at UFC Fight Night 52, but the bout never materialized as Kawajiri was sidelined indefinitely with a detached retina.

Kawajiri faced Dennis Siver on June 20, 2015, at UFC Fight Night 69. He won the fight by unanimous decision.

Kawajiri was expected to face Mirsad Bektic on December 11, 2015, at The Ultimate Fighter 22 Finale. However, Bektic pulled out of the fight on November 27 citing injury. Kawajiri remained on the card and faced promotional newcomer Jason Knight. He won the fight by unanimous decision.

Kawajiri next faced Dennis Bermudez on February 21, 2016, at UFC Fight Night 83. He lost the fight by unanimous decision.

Kawajiri faced Cub Swanson on August 6, 2016, at UFC Fight Night 92. He lost the back and forth fight via unanimous decision.

Kawajiri announced on October 17, 2016, that he has asked for his release from the UFC.

=== Rizin FF ===
After his release from the UFC, Kawajiri immediately signed with Rizin Fighting Federation on October 26, 2016. Just a few days after signing with Rizin FF, it was announced that Kawajiri will be fighting Kron Gracie at Rizin World Grand-Prix 2016: 2nd Round. He lost the bout against Gracie via submission.

== Championships and accomplishments ==
- Shooto
  - Shooto Welterweight Championship (One time)
  - 2002 Shooto Welterweight Rookie Tournament Winner
  - 1999 Amateur Shooto Eastern Japan Open Tournament Winner
- PRIDE Fighting Championships
  - 2005 PRIDE Lightweight Grand Prix Semifinalist
  - 2005 Fight of the Year- vs. Takanori Gomi on September 25
- DREAM
  - 2008 DREAM Lightweight Grand Prix Semifinalist
- Ultimate Fighting Championship
  - Fight of the Night (One time)
- Sports Illustrated
  - 2008 Round of the Year Round 1 vs. Eddie Alvarez on July 21
- Sherdog
  - 2008 Fight of the Year vs. Eddie Alvarez on July 21

== Mixed martial arts record ==
Professional record breakdown
| 53 matches | 37 wins | 14 losses |
| By knockout | 12 | 4 |
| By submission | 10 | 4 |
| By decision | 14 | 6 |
| By disqualification | 1 | 0 |
| Draws | 2 | |

| Res. | Record | Opponent | Method | Event | Date | Round | Time | Location | Notes |
|---|---|---|---|---|---|---|---|---|---|
| Loss | 37–14–2 | Patricky Freire | KO (flying knee and punches) | Rizin 19 | October 12, 2019 | 1 | 1:10 | Osaka, Japan | Lightweight Grand Prix Quarter-Finals |
| Win | 37–13–2 | Ali Abdulkhalikov | Decision (unanimous) | Rizin 17 | July 28, 2019 | 3 | 5:00 | Saitama, Japan | |
| Loss | 36–13–2 | Satoru Kitaoka | Decision (split) | Rizin - Heisei's Last Yarennoka! | December 31, 2018 | 3 | 5:00 | Saitama, Japan | Return to Lightweight. |
| Loss | 36–12–2 | Gabriel Oliveira | KO (knee) | Rizin World Grand Prix 2017: Opening Round - Part 2 | October 15, 2017 | 2 | 1:00 | Fukuoka, Japan | Catchweight (63 kg) bout. |
| Win | 36–11–2 | Anthony Birchak | Decision (unanimous) | Rizin FF 5: Sakura | April 16, 2017 | 2 | 15:00 | Yokohama, Japan | |
| Loss | 35–11–2 | Kron Gracie | Submission (rear-naked choke) | Rizin FF 4: Rizin World Grand Prix 2016: Final Round | December 31, 2016 | 2 | 2:04 | Saitama, Japan | |
| Loss | 35–10–2 | Cub Swanson | Decision (unanimous) | UFC Fight Night: Rodríguez vs. Caceres | August 6, 2016 | 3 | 5:00 | Salt Lake City, Utah, United States | |
| Loss | 35–9–2 | Dennis Bermudez | Decision (unanimous) | UFC Fight Night: Cowboy vs. Cowboy | February 21, 2016 | 3 | 5:00 | Pittsburgh, Pennsylvania, United States | |
| Win | 35–8–2 | Jason Knight | Decision (unanimous) | The Ultimate Fighter: Team McGregor vs. Team Faber Finale | December 11, 2015 | 3 | 5:00 | Las Vegas, Nevada, United States | |
| Win | 34–8–2 | Dennis Siver | Decision (unanimous) | UFC Fight Night: Jędrzejczyk vs. Penne | June 20, 2015 | 3 | 5:00 | Berlin, Germany | |
| Loss | 33–8–2 | Clay Guida | Decision (unanimous) | UFC Fight Night: Nogueira vs. Nelson | April 11, 2014 | 3 | 5:00 | Abu Dhabi, United Arab Emirates | Fight of the Night. |
| Win | 33–7–2 | Sean Soriano | Technical Submission (rear-naked choke) | UFC Fight Night: Saffiedine vs. Lim | January 4, 2014 | 2 | 0:50 | Marina Bay, Singapore | |
| Win | 32–7–2 | Michihiro Omigawa | Decision (unanimous) | DREAM 18 | December 31, 2012 | 3 | 5:00 | Tokyo, Japan | |
| Win | 31–7–2 | Donald Sanchez | Submission (triangle choke) | ONE Fighting Championship: War of the Lions | March 31, 2012 | 1 | 3:27 | Kallang, Singapore | |
| Win | 30–7–2 | Kazuyuki Miyata | Submission (arm-triangle choke) | Fight For Japan: Genki Desu Ka Omisoka 2011 | December 31, 2011 | 2 | 4:54 | Saitama, Japan | |
| Win | 29–7–2 | Joachim Hansen | Submission (arm-triangle choke) | Dream 17 | September 24, 2011 | 3 | 2:30 | Saitama, Japan | Return to Featherweight. |
| Win | 28–7–2 | Drew Fickett | TKO (punches) | Dream: Japan GP Final | July 16, 2011 | 1 | 4:41 | Tokyo, Japan | |
| Loss | 27–7–2 | Gilbert Melendez | TKO (elbows) | Strikeforce: Diaz vs. Daley | April 9, 2011 | 1 | 3:14 | San Diego, California, United States | For the Strikeforce Lightweight Championship. |
| Win | 27–6–2 | Josh Thomson | Decision (unanimous) | Dynamite!! 2010 | December 31, 2010 | 3 | 5:00 | Saitama, Japan | |
| Loss | 26–6–2 | Shinya Aoki | Technical Submission (Achilles lock) | DREAM 15 | July 10, 2010 | 1 | 1:53 | Saitama, Japan | For the DREAM Lightweight Championship |
| Win | 26–5–2 | Kazunori Yokota | Decision (unanimous) | Dynamite!! The Power of Courage 2009 | December 31, 2009 | 3 | 5:00 | Saitama, Japan | |
| Win | 25–5–2 | Melchor Manibusan | TKO (punches) | DREAM 11 | October 6, 2009 | 1 | 3:48 | Yokohama, Japan | |
| Win | 24–5–2 | Gesias Cavalcante | Decision (unanimous) | DREAM 9 | May 26, 2009 | 2 | 5:00 | Yokohama, Japan | |
| Win | 23–5–2 | Ross Ebañez | Submission (rear-naked choke) | DREAM 7 | March 8, 2009 | 1 | 4:03 | Saitama, Japan | |
| Loss | 22–5–2 | Eddie Alvarez | TKO (punches) | Dream 5: Lightweight Grand Prix 2008 Final Round | July 21, 2008 | 1 | 7:35 | Osaka, Japan | DREAM Lightweight Grand Prix Semifinal. |
| Win | 22–4–2 | Luiz Firmino | Decision (unanimous) | Dream 3: Lightweight Grand Prix 2008 Second Round | May 11, 2008 | 2 | 5:00 | Saitama, Saitama, Japan | DREAM Lightweight Grand Prix Quarterfinal. |
| Win | 21–4–2 | Kultar Gill | Decision (unanimous) | Dream 1: Lightweight Grand Prix 2008 First Round | March 15, 2008 | 2 | 5:00 | Saitama, Japan | DREAM Lightweight Grand Prix Opening Round. |
| Win | 20–4–2 | Luiz Azeredo | Decision (unanimous) | Yarennoka! | December 31, 2007 | 2 | 5:00 | Saitama, Japan | |
| Loss | 19–4–2 | Gilbert Melendez | Decision (unanimous) | Pride FC - Shockwave 2006 | December 31, 2006 | 2 | 5:00 | Saitama, Japan | |
| Win | 19–3–2 | Per Eklund | TKO (punches) | Shooto: Champion Carnival | October 14, 2006 | 1 | 4:10 | Yokohama, Japan | |
| Win | 18–3–2 | Chris Brennan | TKO (knee and punches) | Pride - Bushido 12 | August 26, 2006 | 1 | 0:29 | Nagoya, Japan | |
| Win | 17–3–2 | Charles Bennett | Submission (kneebar) | Pride - Bushido 11 | June 4, 2006 | 1 | 2:30 | Saitama, Japan | |
| Win | 16–3–2 | Joachim Hansen | DQ (kick to groin) | Shooto: The Victory of the Truth | February 17, 2006 | 1 | 0:08 | Tokyo, Japan | Defended the Shooto World Welterweight Championship. |
| Loss | 15–3–2 | Takanori Gomi | Submission (rear-naked choke) | Pride: Bushido 9 | September 25, 2005 | 1 | 7:42 | Tokyo, Japan | PRIDE 2005 Lightweight Grand Prix Quarterfinal. |
| Win | 15–2–2 | Luiz Firmino | Decision (unanimous) | Pride: Bushido 8 | July 17, 2005 | 2 | 5:00 | Nagoya, Japan | |
| Win | 14–2–2 | In Seok Kim | TKO (corner stoppage) | PRIDE: Bushido 7 | May 22, 2005 | 1 | 3:28 | Tokyo, Japan | |
| Win | 13–2–2 | Jani Lax | TKO (punches) | Shooto: 4/23 in Hakata Star Lanes | April 23, 2005 | 1 | 4:42 | Hakata, Japan | |
| Win | 12–2–2 | Vítor Ribeiro | TKO (punches) | Shooto: Year End Show 2004 | December 14, 2004 | 2 | 3:11 | Tokyo, Japan | Won the Shooto World Welterweight Championship. |
| Win | 11–2–2 | Mindaugas Laurinaitis | TKO (punches) | Shooto: 9/26 in Kourakuen Hall | September 26, 2004 | 2 | 2:00 | Tokyo, Japan | |
| Draw | 10–2–2 | Caol Uno | Draw | Shooto: 3/22 in Korakuen Hall | March 22, 2004 | 3 | 5:00 | Tokyo, Japan | Featherweight bout. |
| Win | 10–2–1 | Ryan Bow | TKO (punches) | Shooto: Year End Show 2003 | December 14, 2003 | 1 | 4:21 | Urayasu, Japan | |
| Win | 9–2–1 | Yves Edwards | Decision (unanimous) | Shooto: 8/10 in Yokohama Cultural Gymnasium | August 10, 2003 | 3 | 5:00 | Yokohama, Japan | |
| Win | 8–2–1 | Takumi Nakayama | TKO (punches) | Shooto: Shooter's Dream 2 | May 30, 2003 | 1 | 3:44 | Setagaya, Japan | Featherweight bout. |
| Loss | 7–2–1 | Vítor Ribeiro | Decision (unanimous) | Shooto: Year End Show 2002 | December 14, 2002 | 3 | 5:00 | Urayasu, Japan | |
| Win | 7–1–1 | Ken Omatsu | Submission (armbar) | Shooto: Gig West 3 | October 27, 2002 | 1 | 4:40 | Osaka, Japan | Return to Lightweight; Shooto Rookie Tournament Final. |
| Win | 6–1–1 | Tsutomu Shiiki | Submission (rear-naked choke) | Shooto: Treasure Hunt 8 | July 19, 2002 | 1 | 4:42 | Tokyo, Japan | Featherweight bout; Shooto Rookie Tournament Semifinal. |
| Win | 5–1–1 | Daisuke Sugie | TKO (punches) | Shooto: Gig East 9 | May 28, 2002 | 2 | 4:19 | Setagaya, Japan | Welterweight debut. |
| Win | 4–1–1 | Takeshi Yamazaki | Decision (unanimous) | Shooto: Wanna Shooto Japan | April 21, 2002 | 2 | 5:00 | Setagaya, Japan | |
| Win | 3–1–1 | Masaya Takita | TKO (swollen eye) | Shooto: Treasure Hunt 4 | March 13, 2002 | 2 | 1:22 | Setagaya, Japan | Shooto Rookie Tournament Quarterfinal. |
| Win | 2–1–1 | Kazumichi Takada | Technical Submission (triangle armbar) | Shooto: To The Top 9 | September 27, 2001 | 1 | 3:03 | Tokyo, Japan | |
| Win | 1–1–1 | Yohei Suzuki | Submission (rear-naked choke) | Shooto: Gig East 2 | May 22, 2001 | 1 | 2:42 | Setagaya, Japan | Return to Featherweight. |
| Draw | 0–1–1 | Yohei Suzuki | Draw | Shooto: Wanna Shooto 2001 | April 8, 2001 | 2 | 5:00 | Setagaya, Japan | Lightweight debut. |
| Loss | 0–1 | Takumi Nakayama | Submission (rear-naked choke) | Shooto: R.E.A.D. 4 | April 12, 2000 | 1 | 2:44 | Setagaya, Japan | |

== K-1 / Kickboxing record ==
2 Wins (1 (T)KO's), 1 Losses (1 (T)KO's)
| Record | Date | Result | Opponent | Event | Method | Round | Time | Location | Notes |
| 2–1 | 2014-01-12 | Win | (Japan) Kiren Handa | Hoost Cup: Spirit 3 | Decision (Unanimous) | 3 | 3:00 | Telepia Hall, Nagoya, Japan | |
| 1–1 | 2009-07-13 | Loss | (Japan) Masato Kobayashi | K-1 World Max 2009 Final 8 | TKO (Corner Stoppage) | 2 | 1:43 | Yokohama, Japan | |
| 1–0 | 2008-12-31 | Win | (Japan) Kozo Takeda | Dynamite!! 2008 | KO | 1 | 2:47 | Saitama, Japan | |

== See also ==
- List of male mixed martial artists
