= Dream 8 =

Mixed martial arts event in 2009

DREAM.8: Welter Weight Grand Prix 2009 First Round
- The poster for DREAM.8: Welter Weight Grand Prix 2009 First Round
- Promotion: DREAM
- Date: April 5, 2009
- Venue: Nippon Gaishi Hall
- City: Nagoya, Japan
- Attendance: 9,129

Event chronology
Dream.7: Feather Weight Grand Prix 2009 First Round	DREAM.8: Welter Weight Grand Prix 2009 First Round	Dream.9: Feather Weight Grand Prix Second Round

Dream.8: Welter Weight Grand Prix 2009 First Round was a mixed martial arts event promoted by Fighting and Entertainment Group's mixed martial arts promotion Dream on April 5, 2009. Unlike Dream's past tournaments, the Welter Weight Grand Prix is only scheduled to have eight participants. DREAM's welterweight division has a 76 kilograms (168 lb) weight limit.

== Results ==
Welterweight Grand Prix 1st Round
Weight class				Method	Round	Time	Notes
Welterweight	Hayato Sakurai	def.	Shinya Aoki	TKO (Knees and Punches)	1	0:27
Welterweight	Jason High	def.	Yuya Shirai	Submission (Rear-Naked Choke)	1	0:59
Welterweight	Marius Zaromskis	def.	Seichi Ikemoto	Decision (Unanimous)	2	5:00
Welterweight	Andre Galvao	def.	John Alessio	Submission (Armbar)	1	7:34
Featherweight Grandprix 1st round
Featherweight	Daiki Hata	def.	Hideo Tokoro	Decision (Unanimous)	2	5:00
Preliminary card
Heavyweight	Jeff Monson	def.	Sergei Kharitonov	Submission (North-South Choke)	1	1:42
Catchweight (89kg)	Riki Fukuda	def.	Murilo Rua	Decision (Unanimous)	2	5:00
Lightweight	Vítor Ribeiro	def.	Katsuhiko Nagata	TKO (Doctor Stoppage)	1	7:58
Middleweight	Andrews Nakahara	def.	Shungo Oyama	TKO (Punches)	1	2:00
Catchweight (88 kg)	Katsuyori Shibata	def.	Ikuhisa Minowa	Decision (Unanimous)	2	5:00

== See also ==
- Dream (mixed martial arts)
- List of Dream champions
- 2009 in DREAM

== Notes ==
- Nick Diaz was among the early rumored participants in Dream's Welterweight Grand Prix. However, his participation in April's Strikeforce event seems to have excluded him from Dream.8.
- Seichi Ikemoto defeated Hidetaka Monma at Deep 40 to qualify for the Welterweight Grand Prix.
- Yuya Shirai defeated Yoon Young Kim at clubDEEP Tokyo: Protect Cup Final to qualify for the Welterweight Grand Prix.
- One of the first announced bouts was a Middleweight fight between Andrews Nakahara and Zelg Galešić. However, after being admitted to a hospital in Croatia two weeks before DREAM.8, Zelg Galesic was not cleared to fight, and was replaced with Shungo Oyama.
- Another scrapped match was a Middleweight bout between debuting Murilo Rua and Dong Sik Yoon. Two days before DREAM.8 Dong Sik Yoon was pulled from the card due to an unknown injury. He was replaced a day before the event by Riki Fukuda. Fukuda couldn't make the Middleweight limit on such a short notice so the match was held at catchweight of 89kg.
