= Shinya Aoki =

Japanese professional wrestler and mixed martial arts fighter

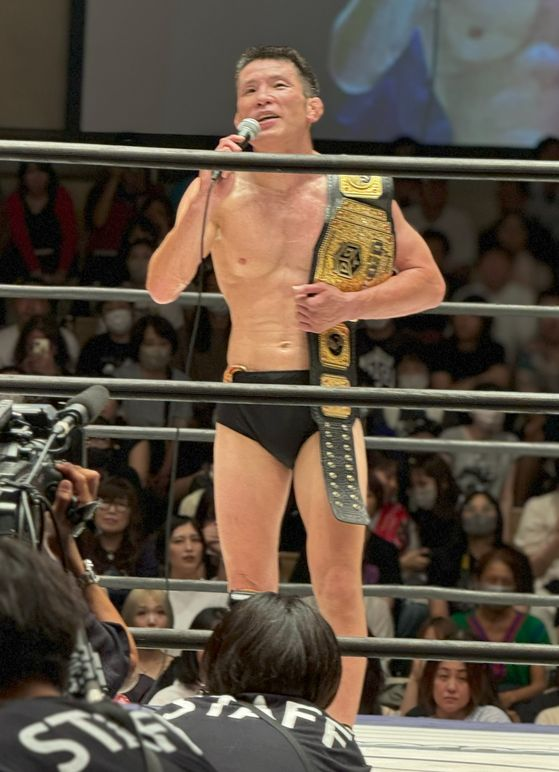
- Aoki in July 2024
- Born: May 9, 1983 (age 43); Shizuoka City, Japan
- Native name: 青木 真也
- Other names: Tobikan Jūdan (The Grand Master of Flying Submissions); The Baka Survivor
- Height: 180 cm (5 ft 11 in)
- Weight: 77 kg (170 lb; 12 st)
- Division: Middleweight; Welterweight; Lightweight; Featherweight
- Reach: 71 in (180 cm)
- Style: Kosen Judo, Catch Wrestling, Muay Thai, Brazilian Jiu-Jitsu, Shootfighting
- Fighting out of: Tanjong Katong, Singapore
- Team: RJJ; Team Roken; Evolve MMA/Paraestra Shooto Gym; Nippon Top Team
- Trainer: Yuki Nakai; Chatri Sityodtong
- Rank: A-Class Shootist; Third dan black belt in Kosen Judo black belt in Brazilian Jiu-Jitsu under Yuki Nakai
- Years active: 2003–present

Mixed martial arts record
- Total: 63
- Wins: 49
- By knockout: 4
- By submission: 32
- By decision: 11
- By disqualification: 2
- Losses: 13
- By knockout: 11
- By decision: 2
- No contests: 1

Other information
- University: Waseda University
- Mixed martial arts record from Sherdog
- Last updated on: April 1, 2019

Shinya Aoki (Japanese: 青木 真也, Hepburn: Aoki Shin'ya; born May 9, 1983) is a Japanese mixed martial artist, professional wrestler, and grappler who competes in Welterweight division of ONE Championship. He is also signed to Japanese promotion DDT Pro-Wrestling (DDT), where he is one-half of the current KO-D Tag Team Champions (with Junta Miyawaki) in their first reign as a team and individually.

A professional competitor since 2003, he is a former DREAM Lightweight Champion, former two-time ONE Lightweight World Champion, former WAMMA Lightweight Champion and former Shooto Welterweight Champion. Aoki is an A-class Shootist and BJJ black belt, both under his long-term mentor Yuki Nakai, as well as a black belt Judoka. In 2008, Aoki, along with DEEP champion Masakazu Imanari and Sengoku champion Satoru Kitaoka, founded the "Nippon Top Team", a group of elite Japanese grapplers competing in MMA.

Besides his MMA credentials, Aoki has garnered several submission grappling accolades including two All Japan Jiu-Jitsu Championships, a Japan Open Jiu-Jitsu Championship, a Budo Open Championship, and an ADCC Japan Championship.

== Early life and judo career ==
Aoki described himself as a problem child while growing up, which caused him to be isolated by his classmates. He found relief joining the judo club while in elementary school. In junior high school, Aoki found himself still below the level of his training partners, so he multiplied his training time, visiting other clubs and teams in his free time. He also researched wrestling and sambo techniques in books and magazines, which would lead to his signature eclectic style. His hard work paid off and his coach proposed him to aim for the national team, but he rejected it to spite his coach for previously looking down on him. Aoki even changed schools to the Shizuoka Gakuen Junior and Senior High School so he would be in a rival team.

Despite his success in competition, Aoki was criticized due to his unorthodox grappling style. He described his judo career as, "a battle against the tacit notion that a judoka's favorite moves must be seoi nage, uchi mata and osoto gari". He was also criticized once when he a struck a victory pose during a tournament, a practice frowned upon in judo. Aoki competed in national championships, rising as a star of the judo club of Waseda University. Even although his clash against his more traditional partners and teachers continued, he would score victories with unusual techniques like tobi-juji-gatame, waki-gatame and kakato-jime.

However, his interest began to move to the more liberal format of mixed martial arts, becoming a fan of Kazushi Sakuraba for his popularity and victories against much heavier opponents in Pride Fighting Championships. Aoki's conflicts in the judo team would only worsen. He admitted he would be disruptive, even keeping submission holds on after his opponents tapped out so he could get revenge on them. While in third year of university, he was finally kicked out of the team, but he was already training in mixed martial arts by this point. He made his professional debut the same year.

== Mixed martial arts career ==
Aoki initially joined the Judo-based RJJ gym before moving to Team Roken along with his longtime friend Masakazu Imanari, though he later moved to Paraestra Shooto Gym, where he trained under former Kosen representative Yuki Nakai. He earned both his A-class Shooto rank as well as his Brazilian Jiu-Jitsu black belt under Nakai, and became one of the team's main teachers.

=== DEEP and Shooto ===
Aoki had his MMA debut for DEEP in November 2003, winning a one night tournament by fast armbar submissions. He later would show further unorthodox grappling skills against veteran Seichi Ikemoto and Keith Wisniewski, who he defeated by breaking his arm with a standing wakigatame also known as a Fujiwara armbar. He also would face legendary Hayato Sakurai in a Shooto event, losing a decision which was seen as controversial. Aoki went to compete in both companies until 2007, also defeating Akira Kikuchi to win the Shooto Welterweight Championship.

=== PRIDE Fighting Championships ===
In August 2006, Aoki made his PRIDE Fighting Championships debut at Pride Bushido 12, submitting American fighter Jason Black in under two minutes with a triangle choke. Following that win, Aoki was booked to face rising Lightweight star Gilbert Melendez at the following Bushido card, Bushido 13. However, prior to the fight Melendez received an elbow injury (a burst bursa sac) in training and was forced to pull out of the fight. Aoki's opponent was changed to Clay French. Aoki submitted French in just under four minutes with a triangle choke. Afterwards, Melendez was shown in the crowd with a sling, and announced he would like to face Aoki at Pride Shockwave 2006 on New Year's Eve. Aoki agreed.

For unknown reasons, the proposed fight with Melendez did not take place. Instead, Aoki faced highly ranked Lightweight fighter Joachim Hansen. Aoki submitted Hansen with a gogoplata—this was the second successful gogoplata in MMA competition (the first by Ryusuke Uemura).

After his win over Hansen, Aoki was set to rematch Kikuchi in Shooto, with Aoki's Shooto Welterweight title (previously won from Kikuchi) on the line. Aoki successfully defended his title against Kikuchi, winning via split decision.

Following his victory, Aoki announced that he was to be the Shooto representative in the forthcoming Pride Lightweight Grand Prix tournament. Aoki's next fight was at Pride 34, where he faced little known Dutch fighter Brian Lo-A-Njoe. At the event Aoki submitted Lo-A-Njoe in the first round with an armbar. Following the fight, Aoki once again confirmed his participation in the Lightweight Grand Prix. With the purchase of Pride by the majority owners of Zuffa LLC, the Pride Lightweight Grand Prix was cancelled.

On November 21, 2007, Aoki's participation on the New Year's Eve MMA card Yarennoka! was announced. Originally, his opponent was to be two-time K-1 Hero's Middleweight Grand Prix champion Gesias "JZ Calvan" Cavalcante. Rumors that Cavalcante was injured surfaced only two weeks before the bout, though Cavalcante denied them before eventually admitting the injury and withdrawing from the fight. Aoki defeated Korean Olympic Judo silver medalist Jung Bu-Kyung, Cavalcante's replacement, via unanimous decision in what was Jung Bu-Kyung's mixed martial arts debut. Aoki had promised to use a never before seen submission in the match but was unable to finish the debut fighter.

=== Fighting and Entertainment Group ===
After the purchase of Pride by Zuffa LLC, most Japanese fighters signed to newly created mixed martial arts promotions, with Aoki signing to Dream. Here Aoki finally faced Cavalcante on March 15, 2008, at the opening round of the Dream Lightweight Grand Prix tournament. Early in the first round, the referee stopped the action when Cavalcante apparently landed illegal elbow strikes to the back of Aoki's neck. The ringside doctor announced that Aoki was unable to continue due to the injury and Cavalcante apologized for the incident. The fight resulted in a no contest. Elbow strikes to the neck and spine area are illegal under Dream rules. Aoki was later found to have sustained concussion of the cervical vertebra.

They had their rematch at Dream 2 on April 29, 2008. In that match, Aoki defeated Cavalcante via unanimous decision. He sustained a severely bruised rib and tore cartilage in his costal area during the match. At Dream 4, Aoki defeated Katsuhiko Nagata via a mounted gogoplata (possibly the first ever in professional competition, later to be dubbed "the Aoki-plata") submission to advance to the semi-finals of the Dream Lightweight Grand Prix. At Dream 5, Aoki defeated Caol Uno by unanimous decision. Later that night, Eddie Alvarez was set to fight Aoki, but had to bow out due to injury from his previous match that evening. Joachim Hansen took his place and defeated Aoki by TKO (punches) at 4:19 round 1 to become the first Dream Lightweight Champion.

At Dynamite!! 2008 on New Year's Eve, Aoki finally squared off against American Eddie Alvarez for the WAMMA Lightweight Championship. Aoki started quickly, securing Alvarez's back after catching a kick, before being thrown to the canvas by the stronger American. In a scramble, Aoki latched onto the foot of Alvarez and applied a heel hook. Alvarez fought the hold, but tapped out shortly after Aoki adjusted his grip. Alvarez also suffered ligament damage in his knee.

Aoki defeated David Gardner at the March 8, 2009, Featherweight Grand Prix card at Dream 7 at the Saitama Super Arena in Saitama, Japan. This fight is remembered for Gardner waving to the crowd as Aoki was controlling his back and saying "Hello, Japan!", thus allowing Aoki to secure a rear-naked choke from that position. Aoki, who was still recognized by Shooto as its Welterweight (168 pounds (76 kg)) Champion, also moved back to that weight to fight in Dream's Welterweight Grand Prix at Dream 8 in 2009. His first match in the tournament was a rematch with Hayato Sakurai. Aoki lost the fight in twenty-seven seconds via TKO due to punches and knees following a Sakurai reversal from a takedown by Aoki. As a result of the match, Aoki did not advance in the DREAM 2009 Welterweight Grand Prix.

Aoki met Fedor Emelianenko during a five-minute "special exhibition" at an April 29 M-1 Challenge (presented by Affliction) event in Tokyo. Emelianenko made Aoki tap out from an Achilles lock.

Aoki defeated Vítor Ribeiro at Dream 10 on July 20, 2009, which earned him a title fight against Joachim Hansen. Aoki faced Joachim Hansen in a rematch for the DREAM Lightweight Championship at Dream 11 on October 6, 2009. Last time they met, Aoki previously fought a tough match against Caol Uno on the same night which went on for both two rounds (15 minutes) when Hansen only fought for 2 minutes 35 seconds previously. Aoki ended up defeating Hansen in the second round for the title shot via submission (armbar) to become the new DREAM Lightweight Champion.

==== Hirota fight ====
On December 22, 2009, it was announced that Aoki would not be taking on fellow DREAM fighter Tatsuya Kawajiri, but would be fighting Sengoku Lightweight Champion, Mizuto Hirota. In his pre-fight interview Aoki stated that he felt insulted with the short notice changes as he was looking forward to battling it out with one of the world's other top lightweight competitors in Kawajiri. Aoki's opponent Hirota just came off a spectacular win over longtime friend of Aoki's, Satoru Kitaoka to become the new Sengoku Lightweight champion. The fight between Aoki and Hirota was considered to be one of the main events of the night along with Satoshi Ishii vs. Hidehiko Yoshida and the K-1 bout Masato vs Andy Souwer.

Aoki defeated Hirota with a brutal hammerlock submission that broke Hirota's arm in the first round at 1:17. In a moment which attracted great controversy, Aoki then proceeded to get in the face of his downed opponent and give him the finger, after which got up and ran excitedly around the ring doing the same to the crowd before leaving. Despite the crowd actually cheering him back, pundits found the act extremely offensive and unsportsmanlike. among them Dream executive Keiichi Sasahara and Aoki's own trainer Yuki Nakai.

Aoki would apologize for his behavior in his post fight interview, stating "after my fight, I was excited, and so I did something rude that I should apologize for. But that showed just how excited I was over that fight." He still defended his action: "when I had his arm behind his back, I could feel it popping, I thought, 'Well, this guy's pride just won't let him tap, will it?' So without hesitation, I broke it. I heard it break, and I thought, 'Ah, there, I just broke it.' I was stopped afterward, but even if I hadn't been, continuing to break it more would have been fine by me." As a result of his actions following his win, Aoki was dismissed as an instructor at the Paraestra Kasai gym, though he kept training under Nakai and representing Paraestra.

=== DREAM and Strikeforce ===
Aoki lost his US debut against then Strikeforce Lightweight Champion Gilbert Melendez on April 17, 2010, at Strikeforce: Nashville. The fight was broadcast live to a North American audience on CBS. After Aoki's defeat to Gilbert Melendez in Strikeforce he has expressed interest to train at Cesar Gracie's camp in northern California.

Aoki successfully defended his Lightweight title against top contender Tatsuya Kawajiri in just under two minutes of the first round via an Achilles lock submission, at Dream 15 on July 10, 2010.

Aoki defeated Marcus Aurélio by unanimous decision in a non-title bout on September 25, 2010, at Dream 16.

He then competed again at Deep: 50th Impact on October 24 against former PABA and WBA boxing champion Yokthai Sithoar. Aoki won by submission (americana) 1:00 into the first round against Sithoar.

After the proposed rematch with Melendez fell through due to contract issues on Melendez's part, Aoki faced K-1 kickboxer Yuichiro "Jienotsu" Nagashima in a special rules exhibition bout at Dynamite!! 2010. In the first 3-minute kickboxing round, Aoki evaded Nagashima's offense by breaking the rules via excessive clinching, falling to the ground, and going for takedowns in order to run out the clock and move onto the 5-minute mixed martial arts round. Aoki was warned repeatedly by the referee, however no points were deducted as there could not be a decision winner. The commentary team of Michael Schiavello and Frank Trigg were openly criticising Aoki for his rule breaking during the first round, while the Japanese crowd uncharacteristically booed him. At 0:04 of the second MMA rules round, Aoki was knocked out immediately as he went for a double leg takedown via flying knee and subsequent grounded strikes. Since the bout was contested as an exhibition, the loss is not reflected on Aoki's professional mixed martial arts record.

Aoki then defeated Lyle Beerbohm on April 9, 2011, at Strikeforce: Diaz vs. Daley via neck crank in the first round.

Aoki was expected to face Willamy Freire on May 29, 2011, at Dream: Fight for Japan!. Freire reportedly had trouble getting a visa, and it then appeared that he would be facing Antonio McKee instead, but then McKee chose to pull out of the card. It was then announced that Shane Nelson would fight Aoki, but he was quickly replaced with Rich Clementi. Aoki defeated Clementi by way of Neck Crank/Rear Naked Choke at the 2:32 mark of the second round.

Aoki defeated Rob McCullough by neck crank at the 4:57 point of Round 1 at Dream 17.

Aoki fought Satoru Kitaoka for the DREAM lightweight title at Fight For Japan: Genki Desu Ka Omisoka 2011. He won the fight via unanimous decision.

Aoki Took on former Maximum Fighting Championship Lightweight Champion, Antonio McKee at Dream 18 on December 31, 2012. He won via TKO in the second round.

=== Bellator Fighting Championships ===
Aoki faced Eddie Alvarez in a rematch at Bellator 66. He lost the fight via TKO in the first round.

=== ONE Championship ===
On June 27 it was revealed that Aoki had signed an exclusive contract with ONE Championship and would be making his debut at ONE Fighting Championship: Pride of a Nation in Manila on August 31. On August 16 it was revealed that Aoki would be fighting Arnaud Lepont in a lightweight super fight in the main event at ONE Fighting Championship: Rise of Kings He won the fight via triangle choke at the 1:25 point of the first round.

Aoki faced Kotetsu Boku at ONE Fighting Championship: Kings and Champions on April 5, 2013, for the Lightweight Championship. He stated that win or lose, he will be dropping to the Featherweight division after the fight. Aoki defeated his opponent at 2:01 of the second round via rear-naked choke, successfully avenging his Evolve teammate Zorobabel Moreira.

Aoki made his featherweight debut on October 18, 2013, at ONE FC: Total Domination when he took on Cody Stevens. He won the fight via unanimous decision.

Aoki later returned to lightweight and picked up a victory in the Inoki Bom-Ba-Ye promotion before successfully defending his ONE Lightweight World Championship against Kamal Shalorus by submission in the first round at ONE FC: Reign of Champions on August 29, 2014.

On December 31, he submitted Yuki Yamamoto in Inoki Bom-Ba-Ye, after which Aoki again taunted controversially his opponent and the crowd with a middle finger, while Yamamoto had to be restrained by his cornermen. Shinya left the arena without putting down the taunt. Aoki defended his title against Koji Ando at ONE Championship 28: Warrior's Quest on May 22, 2015.

=== RIZIN Fighting Federation ===
Rizin Fighting Federation announced Aoki would compete on December 29, 2015, against Kazushi Sakuraba in the main event of their inaugural event. He won the fight via TKO at 5:56 in the first round after Sakuraba's corner threw in the towel.

=== Return to ONE Championship ===
In the third defense of his title, Aoki faced Eduard Folayang at ONE: Defending Honor on November 11, 2016. He lost the bout and title via TKO in the third round.

Aoki faced Ben Askren for the ONE Welterweight World Championship on November 24, 2017, at ONE: Immortal Pursuit. He lost the fight via TKO in the fight's opening minute.

Aoki faced Ev Ting on October 6, 2018, at ONE: Kingdom of Heroes and won the fight via arm-triangle choke in the opening minute of the bout. Due to the victory, Aoki secured a fight for the vacant lightweight championship against the winner of Eduard Folayang and Amir Khan in the promotion's inaugural event in Tokyo, Japan on March 31, 2019.

On March 31, 2019, at ONE Championship: A New Era Aoki recaptured the lightweight title in a rematch with Eduard Folayang by defeating Folayang via technical submission.

Aoki lost the title in his first defense against Christian Lee at ONE Championship: Enter the Dragon on May 17, 2019.

He returned to defeat Honorio Banario via D'Arce choke at ONE: Century – Part 2.

Aoki next faced Kimihiro Eto at Road to One 3: Tokyo Fight Night on September 10, 2020. He won the fight via unanimous decision.

Aoki faced James Nakashima on January 22, 2021, at ONE Championship: Unbreakable He won the fight via submission in the first round.

Aoki was scheduled to face Sage Northcutt at ONE on TNT 4 on April 28, 2021. The bout was subsequently cancelled due to Sage still having lingering effects from COVID-19. A new bout was scheduled for the event with Aoki facing off against former rival Eduard Folayang. He won the bout via armbar in the first round.

Aoki faced Yoshihiro Akiyama at ONE: X on March 26, 2022. He lost the fight via TKO in the second round.

Aoki faced Saygid Izagakhmaev on November 19, 2022, at ONE 163. He lost the fight by a first-round technical knockout.

Aoki was scheduled to face Sage Northcutt on January 28, 2024, at ONE 165. However, Northcutt withdrew during the event due to two of his coaches (one being Urijah Faber) not having work visas. Northcutt was replaced by John Lineker in a openweight bout. Aoki defeated Lineker by rear-naked submission in the first round.

Aoki faced Eduard Folayang in a tetralogy bout on March 23, 2025, at ONE 172. Aoki defeated Folayang by armbar in the first round.

=== Rizin ===
Aoki is scheduled to face Mikuru Asakura on September 10, 2026 at Super Rizin 5.

== Professional wrestling career ==
=== Inoki Genome Federation (2013–2017) ===
Aoki began dabbling in pro wrestling in 2014 for Antonio Inoki's Inoki Genome Federation (IGF), competing in a series of MMA fights on his cards before eventually transitioning to pro wrestling. In 2017, Aoki was announced as a member of Next Exciting Wrestling (NEW), a new show under the IGF banner. Aoki competed on the first show, defeating Keisuke Okuda. Aoki competed for NEW until IGF announced its cancellation in July 2017. In his last match for NEW, Aoki lost to Tatsuhito Takaiwa.

=== DDT Pro Wrestling (2018–present) ===
After a short hiatus, Aoki announced his return to pro wrestling in 2018, and that he would be competing for DDT Pro Wrestling. Aoki made his in-ring debut at Maji Manji #15, quickly defeating Gota Ihashi. On October 28, at Maji Manji #21, Aoki defeated Harashima to win the DDT Extreme Championship. Aoki lost the title back to Harashima on February 19, 2019, at Judgement.

== Grappling career ==
At the Reversal Cup in 2004, Aoki fought Kuniyoshi Hironaka in a superfight and submitted him with a flying armbar that broke his arm.

Aoki was scheduled to compete against Gordon Ryan at a ONE Championship event in August, 2021 but the match was cancelled due to a stomach condition that Ryan was suffering from at the time. He was then booked to compete against Kade Ruotolo at ONE 157 on May 20, 2021, instead. Aoki lost the match by decision.

Aoki competed against Mikey Musumeci in an openweight grappling match at ONE Fight Night 15 on October 6, 2023. He lost the match by submission.

Aoki competed against Cole Abate at ONE Fight Night 26 on December 6, 2024. He lost the match by submission.

== Fighting style ==
Aoki is nicknamed "Tobikan Judan" (跳関十段 "The Grand Master of Flying Submissions") due to his use of dynamic and unconventional submission techniques. 4 Aoki is known for his heavy specialization in grappling, often prioritizing submission techniques over striking in his mixed martial arts approach. As a result, his stand-up game primarily focuses on taking opponents to the ground, utilizing chain wrestling and judo techniques from the clinch, as well as guard pulling.

Once on the mat, Aoki utilizes techniques from multiple disciplines, including Shooto shoot wrestling, judo, Brazilian jiu-jitsu, and Eddie Bravo's 10th Planet Jiu-Jitsu system. He is an active guard player, especially favouring the rubber guard due to his flexibility, and is known for his creative submission approach, utilizing armlocks, leglocks, neck cranks, and other joint locks.

Aoki typically pursus submission finishes rather than allowing fights to go to the judges' decision. He describes his fights ending in decisions as, "whenever I win, it's dumb luck, and whenever I lose, it's my fault". He is known for often injuring his opponents, cranking up submissions to achieve breaks rather than seeking to force fighters into tapping out. He gained attention by breaking Keith Wisniewski's arm by waki-gatame, then doing the same with Kuniyoshi Hironaka via flying armbar in a submission grappling match, sidelining him for a year.

== Championships and accomplishments ==
=== Mixed martial arts ===
- DEEP
  - DEEP West Chofu Tournament Winner
- DREAM
  - DREAM Lightweight Championship (One time, last)
  - two successful title defenses
- ONE Championship
  - ONE Lightweight World Championship (Two times)
  - two successful title defenses
  - Submission of the Year 2021 vs. James Nakashima
- Professional Shooto Japan
  - Shooto Middleweight Championship (One time)
  - one successful title defense
- World Alliance of Mixed Martial Arts
  - WAMMA Lightweight Championship (One time; first; last)
- MMA Fighting
  - 2006 Submission of the Year vs. Joachim Hansen at Pride Shockwave 2006
- Inside MMA
  - 2008 Submission of the Year Bazzie Award vs. Katsuhiko Nagata on June 15
- Sherdog
  - 2011 All-Violence Third Team
  - 2006 Submission of the Year vs. Joachim Hansen on December 31
- Bleacher Report
  - 2000s Grappler of the Decade
- fightmatrix.com
  - Lineal MMA Lightweight Championship (One time)
  - Six Successful Title defenses

=== Professional wrestling ===
- DDT Pro-Wrestling
  - DDT Extreme Championship (3 times)
  - Ironman Heavymetalweight Championship (3 times)
  - KO-D Openweight Championship (1 time)
  - KO-D Tag Team Championship (1 time) – with Junta Miyawaki
  - KO-D 6-Man Tag Team Championship (1 time) – with Super Sasadango Machine and Yuki Ueno
  - KO-D 8-Man/10-Man Tag Team Championship (2 times) – with Super Sasadango Machine, Antonio Honda and Kazuki Hirata (1) and Mao, Yuki Ueno, Shunma Katsumata and Toui Kojima (1)
  - King of DDT Tournament (2026)
- Tokyo Sports
  - Technique Award (2024)

=== Submission grappling ===
- ADCC Japan
  - 66–76 kg: 1st place
- Deep X
  - Deep X Superfight Champion (2007)
- Shooto
  - Shooto Grappling Champion (2006)
- Dumau/Kansai
  - Dumau/Kansai Cup Champion (2005)
- All Japan Jiu-Jitsu
  - All Japan Champion (2004-brown belt); (2005-black belt)
- Rickson Gracie's Budo Challenge
  - 2005 Middleweight Champion
- Rickson Gracie Invitational
  - 1st place
- Other Accolades
  - Top five collegiate Judoka
  - GI Grappling 05, 1st place
  - Reversal Cup Champion (2004)

== Mixed martial arts record ==
Professional record breakdown
63 matches	49 wins	13 losses
By knockout	4	11
By submission	32	0
By decision	11	2
By disqualification	2	0
No contests	1	

Res.	Record	Opponent	Method	Event	Date	Round	Time	Location	Notes
Loss	49–13 (1)	Mikuru Asakura	KO (punches)	Super Rizin 5	September 10, 2026	1	2:39	Osaka, Japan	Return to Lightweight.
Loss	49–12 (1)	Hiroyuki Tetsuka	TKO (punches and knees)	ONE 173	November 16, 2025	2	0:28	Tokyo, Japan	
Win	49–11 (1)	Eduard Folayang	Submission (armbar)	ONE 172	March 23, 2025	1	0:53	Saitama, Japan	
Win	48–11 (1)	John Lineker	Submission (rear-naked choke)	ONE 165	January 28, 2024	1	3:00	Tokyo, Japan	Openweight bout. Performance of the Night.
Loss	47–11 (1)	Saygid Izagakhmaev	TKO (punches)	ONE 163	November 19, 2022	1	1:26	Kallang, Singapore	
Loss	47–10 (1)	Yoshihiro Akiyama	TKO (punches)	ONE: X	March 26, 2022	2	1:50	Kallang, Singapore	
Win	47–9 (1)	Eduard Folayang	Submission (armbar)	ONE on TNT 4	April 28, 2021	1	4:20	Kallang, Singapore	
Win	46–9 (1)	James Nakashima	Submission (rear-naked choke)	ONE: Unbreakable	January 22, 2021	1	2:42	Kallang, Singapore	
Win	45–9 (1)	Kimihiro Eto	Decision (unanimous)	Road to ONE: 3rd Tokyo Fight Night	September 10, 2020	3	5:00	Tokyo, Japan	
Win	44–9 (1)	Honorio Banario	Technical Submission (brabo choke)	ONE: Century – Part 2	October 13, 2019	1	0:54	Tokyo, Japan	
Loss	43–9 (1)	Christian Lee	TKO (punches)	ONE: Enter the Dragon	May 17, 2019	2	0:51	Kallang, Singapore	Lost the ONE Lightweight Championship (170 lb).
Win	43–8 (1)	Eduard Folayang	Technical Submission (arm-triangle choke)	ONE: A New Era	March 31, 2019	1	2:34	Tokyo, Japan	Won the ONE Lightweight Championship (170 lb).
Win	42–8 (1)	Ev Ting	Submission (arm-triangle choke)	ONE: Kingdom of Heroes	October 6, 2018	1	0:57	Bangkok, Thailand	
Win	41–8 (1)	Shannon Wiratchai	TKO (elbows)	ONE: Reign of Kings	July 27, 2018	1	2:16	Pasay, Philippines	
Win	40–8 (1)	Rasul Yakhyaev	Submission (triangle choke)	ONE: Unstoppable Dreams	May 18, 2018	1	3:15	Kallang, Singapore	
Loss	39–8 (1)	Ben Askren	TKO (punches)	ONE: Immortal Pursuit	November 24, 2017	1	0:57	Kallang, Singapore	Return to Welterweight. For the ONE Welterweight Championship.
Loss	39–7 (1)	Eduard Folayang	TKO (knees and punches)	ONE: Defending Honor	November 11, 2016	3	0:41	Kallang, Singapore	Lost the ONE Lightweight Championship.
Win	39–6 (1)	Kazushi Sakuraba	TKO (corner stoppage)	Rizin World Grand Prix 2015: Part 1 - Saraba	December 29, 2015	1	5:56	Saitama, Japan	Welterweight bout.
Win	38–6 (1)	Koji Ando	Decision (unanimous)	ONE: Warrior's Quest	May 22, 2015	5	5:00	Kallang, Singapore	Defended the ONE Lightweight Championship.
Win	37–6 (1)	Yuki Yamamoto	Submission (twister)	Inoki Bom-Ba-Ye 2014	December 31, 2014	1	1:21	Tokyo, Japan	
Win	36–6 (1)	Kamal Shalorus	Submission (rear-naked choke)	ONE FC: Reign of Champions	August 29, 2014	1	2:15	Dubai, United Arab Emirates	Defended the ONE Lightweight Championship.
Win	35–6 (1)	Toshikatsu Harada	Technical Submission (triangle armbar)	Inoki Bom-Ba-Ye 2013	December 31, 2013	1	0:49	Tokyo, Japan	Return to Lightweight.
Win	34–6 (1)	Cody Stevens	Decision (unanimous)	ONE FC: Total Domination	October 18, 2013	3	5:00	Kallang, Singapore	Featherweight debut.
Win	33–6 (1)	Kotetsu Boku	Submission (rear-naked choke)	ONE FC: Kings and Champions	April 5, 2013	2	2:01	Kallang, Singapore	Won the ONE Lightweight Championship.
Win	32–6 (1)	Antonio McKee	TKO (submission to punch)	Dream 18	December 31, 2012	2	0:24	Tokyo, Japan	Non-title bout.
Win	31–6 (1)	Arnaud Lepont	Technical Submission (triangle choke)	ONE FC: Rise of Kings	October 6, 2012	1	1:25	Kallang, Singapore	
Loss	30–6 (1)	Eddie Alvarez	TKO (punches)	Bellator 66	April 20, 2012	1	2:14	Cleveland, Ohio, United States	
Win	30–5 (1)	Satoru Kitaoka	Decision (unanimous)	Fight For Japan: Genki Desu Ka Omisoka 2011	December 31, 2011	5	5:00	Saitama, Japan	Defended the Dream Lightweight Championship.
Win	29–5 (1)	Rob McCullough	Submission (neck crank)	Dream 17	September 24, 2011	1	4:57	Saitama, Japan	Non-title bout.
Win	28–5 (1)	Rich Clementi	Submission (neck crank)	DREAM: Fight for Japan!	May 29, 2011	2	2:32	Saitama, Japan	Non-title bout.
Win	27–5 (1)	Lyle Beerbohm	Submission (neck crank)	Strikeforce: Diaz vs. Daley	April 9, 2011	1	1:33	San Diego, California, United States	
Win	26–5 (1)	Yokthai Sithoar	Submission (keylock)	DEEP: 50 Impact	October 24, 2010	1	1:00	Tokyo, Japan	
Win	25–5 (1)	Marcus Aurélio	Decision (unanimous)	Dream 16	September 25, 2010	2	5:00	Nagoya, Japan	Non-title bout.
Win	24–5 (1)	Tatsuya Kawajiri	Submission (achilles lock)	Dream 15	July 10, 2010	1	1:53	Saitama, Japan	Defended the Dream Lightweight Championship.
Loss	23–5 (1)	Gilbert Melendez	Decision (unanimous)	Strikeforce: Nashville	April 17, 2010	5	5:00	Nashville, Tennessee, United States	For the Strikeforce Lightweight Championship.
Win	23–4 (1)	Mizuto Hirota	Technical Submission (hammerlock)	Dynamite!! 2009	December 31, 2009	1	1:17	Saitama, Japan	Non-title bout.
Win	22–4 (1)	Joachim Hansen	Submission (armbar)	Dream 11	October 6, 2009	2	4:56	Yokohama, Japan	Won the Dream Lightweight Championship.
Win	21–4 (1)	Vítor Ribeiro	Decision (unanimous)	Dream 10	July 20, 2009	2	5:00	Saitama, Japan	
Loss	20–4 (1)	Hayato Sakurai	KO (knees and punches)	Dream 8	April 5, 2009	1	0:27	Nagoya, Japan	Welterweight bout. 2009 Dream Welterweight Grand Prix Opening round.
Win	20–3 (1)	David Gardner	Submission (rear-naked choke)	Dream 7	March 8, 2009	1	5:58	Saitama, Japan	Catchweight (163 lb) bout.
Win	19–3 (1)	Eddie Alvarez	Submission (heel hook)	Dynamite!! 2008	December 31, 2008	1	1:32	Saitama, Japan	Won the inaugural WAMMA Lightweight Championship.
Win	18–3 (1)	Todd Moore	Submission (neck crank)	Dream 6	September 23, 2008	1	1:10	Saitama, Japan	
Loss	17–3 (1)	Joachim Hansen	TKO (punches)	Dream 5	July 21, 2008	1	4:19	Osaka, Japan	2008 Dream Lightweight Grand Prix Final. For the inaugural Dream Lightweight Championship.
Win	17–2 (1)	Caol Uno	Decision (unanimous)	Dream 5	July 21, 2008	2	5:00	Osaka, Japan	2008 Dream Lightweight Grand Prix Semifinal.
Win	16–2 (1)	Katsuhiko Nagata	Submission (gogoplata)	Dream 4	June 15, 2008	1	5:12	Yokohama, Japan	2008 Dream Lightweight Grand Prix Quarterfinal.
Win	15–2 (1)	Gesias Cavalcante	Decision (unanimous)	Dream 2	April 29, 2008	2	5:00	Saitama, Japan	2008 Dream Lightweight Grand Prix Opening round.
NC	14–2 (1)	Gesias Cavalcante	NC (Aoki injured by illegal elbows)	Dream 1	March 15, 2008	1	3:46	Saitama, Japan	2008 Dream Lightweight Grand Prix Opening round. Accidental illegal elbows rendered Aoki unable to continue.
Win	14–2	Jung Bu-kyung	Decision (unanimous)	Yarennoka!	December 31, 2007	2	5:00	Saitama, Japan	
Win	13–2	Brian Lo-A-Njoe	Submission (armbar)	Pride 34	April 8, 2007	1	1:33	Saitama, Japan	
Win	12–2	Akira Kikuchi	Decision (split)	Shooto: Back To Our Roots 1	February 17, 2007	3	5:00	Yokohama, Japan	Defended the Shooto Welterweight Championship.
Win	11–2	Joachim Hansen	Submission (gogoplata)	Pride Shockwave 2006	December 31, 2006	1	2:24	Saitama, Japan	
Win	10–2	Clay French	Submission (flying triangle choke)	Pride Bushido 13	November 5, 2006	1	3:57	Yokohama, Japan	
Win	9–2	George Sotiropoulos	DQ (groin kick)	Shooto: Champion Carnival	October 14, 2006	2	0:05	Yokohama, Japan	
Win	8–2	Jason Black	Submission (triangle choke)	Pride Bushido 12	August 26, 2006	1	1:58	Nagoya, Japan	
Win	7–2	Akira Kikuchi	Decision (unanimous)	Shooto: The Victory of the Truth	February 17, 2006	3	5:00	Tokyo, Japan	Won the Shooto Welterweight Championship.
Win	6–2	Kuniyoshi Hironaka	TKO (doctor stoppage)	Shooto 2005: 11/6 in Korakuen Hall	November 6, 2005	1	2:10	Tokyo, Japan	
Loss	5–2	Hayato Sakurai	Decision (unanimous)	Shooto: Alive Road	August 20, 2005	3	5:00	Yokohama, Japan	
Win	5–1	Shigetoshi Iwase	DQ (groin strike)	Shooto 2005: 7/30 in Korakuen Hall	July 30, 2005	1	0:35	Tokyo, Japan	
Win	4–1	Keith Wisniewski	Submission (standing armlock)	Shooto: 1/29 in Korakuen Hall	January 29, 2005	1	2:22	Tokyo, Japan	
Loss	3–1	Jutaro Nakao	KO (punch)	DEEP: 16th Impact	August 30, 2004	1	4:29	Tokyo, Japan	
Win	3–0	Seichi Ikemoto	Submission (armbar)	DEEP: 15th Impact	July 3, 2004	2	0:52	Tokyo, Japan	
Win	2–0	Yasutoshi Ryu	Submission (armbar)	Deep: clubDeep West Chofu	November 24, 2003	1	0:51	Tokyo, Japan	Won the clubDeep West Chofu Tournament.
Win	1–0	Dai Okimura	Submission (armbar)	Deep: clubDeep West Chofu	November 24, 2003	1	3:14	Tokyo, Japan	clubDeep West Chofu Tournament Semifinal.

=== Mixed rules record ===
Professional record breakdown
1 match	0 wins	1 loss
By knockout	0	1

Res.	Record	Opponent	Method	Event	Date	Round	Time	Location	Notes
Loss	0–1	Yuichiro Nagashima	KO (flying knee)	Dynamite!! 2010	December 31, 2010	2	0:04	Chūō-ku, Saitama City, Japan	

Legend: Win Loss Draw/No contest Notes |}

== Submission grappling record ==
Result	Opponent	Method	Event	Date	Round	Time	Notes
Loss	(United States) Mikey Musumeci	Submission (Achilles lock)	ONE Fight Night 15	October 7, 2023	1	3:05	
Loss	(United States) Kade Ruotolo	Decision	ONE 157	May 20, 2022	1	10:00	
Draw	(Japan) Tomoshige Sera	Decision	Road to ONE 2nd: Aoki vs Sera	April 17, 2020	1	10:00	
Win	(Russia) Marat Gafurov	Submission (rear-naked choke)	ONE Championship: Kings of Courage	January 20, 2018	1	12:22	
Loss	(United States) Garry Tonon	Submission (heel hook)	ONE Championship: Dynasty of Heroes	May 26, 2017	1	7:47	
Loss	(Brazil) Kron Gracie	Submission (guillotine choke)	Metamoris II: Gracie vs Aoki	June 9, 2013	1	6:50	
Win	(Brazil) Pedro Akira	Submission (rear-naked choke)	DEEP X 2007	2007	1	N/A	
Win	(United States) Cameron Earle	Submission (ankle hold)	Budo Challenge –77 kg	2006	1	N/A	
Win	(Egypt) Ali Abdelaziz	Submission (flying armbar)	Budo Challenge –77 kg	2006	1	2:48	
Win	(Japan) Hiroshi Tsuruya	Submission (gogoplata)	Shooto	2006	1	N/A	
Win	(Japan) Naoyoshi Watanabe	Decision (points)	Professional Jiu Kansai	2005	1	N/A	
Loss	(Brazil) Roger Gracie	Submission (ankle hold)	ADCC 2005 Absolute	2005	1	N/A	
Loss	(Brazil) Marcelo García	Submission	ADCC 2005 –77 kg	2005	1	N/A	
Win	(United States) Marcos Avellan	Submission	ADCC 2005 –77 kg	2005	1	N/A	
Win	(Japan) Masato Fujiwara	Submission (armbar)	ADCC 2005 Japan Qualifiers	2005	1	N/A	
Win	(Brazil) Mateus Irie Nechio	Submission (heel hook)	ADCC 2005 Japan Qualifiers	2005	1	N/A	
Win	(China) Jung Changyoru	Submission (spinning choke)	ADCC 2005 Japan Qualifiers	2005	1	N/A	
Win	(Japan) Koji Komuro	Submission (flying armbar)	Campeonato Japones de Jiu-Jitsu Abierto	2004	1	N/A	
Win	(Japan) Kuniyoshi Hironaka	Submission (flying armbar)	COPA Reversal 2004 〜Festa do Jiu-Jitsu〜	2004	1	N/A	
Loss	(Japan) Naoyoshi Watanabe	Decision (points)	Professional Jiu Ground Impact 〜Gi-05〜 Midday War	2004	1	N/A	

== See also ==
- List of current ONE fighters
- List of current mixed martial arts champions
- List of male mixed martial artists
- List of Brazilian Jiu-Jitsu practitioners

== Sources ==
- Aoki, Shinya (2016). Kuki o yonde wa ikenai (in Japanese). Gentosha. ISBN 978-4344029989.
- Yu, Al (August 25, 2006). "Miletich's Jason Black to Face Shooto Champion". MMAWeekly.com. Archived from the original on September 29, 2007.
- Yu, Al (December 29, 2006). "A Word from the Asian Sensation..." MMAWeekly.com. Archived from the original on September 26, 2007.

Preceded by Joachim Hansen	2nd DREAM Lightweight Champion; October 6, 2009 – June 3, 2012	Vacant Promotion ended
Preceded by Akira Kikuchi	Shooto Middleweight Champion; February 17, 2006 – May 21, 2010	Succeeded by Luis Ramos
