= Akira Kikuchi =

Japanese mixed martial arts fighter

Akira Kikuchi 菊地昭
- Born: July 23, 1978 (age 44); Miyagi-ken, Japan
- Nationality: Japanese
- Height: 5 ft 8 in (1.73 m)
- Weight: 167 lb (76 kg; 11.9 st)
- Division: Welterweight
- Fighting out of: Tokyo, Japan
- Team: Krazy Bee
- Rank: 3rd Dan Black Belt in Judo

Mixed martial arts record
- Total: 20
- Wins: 16
- By knockout: 5
- By submission: 7
- By decision: 4
- Losses: 4
- By knockout: 1
- By decision: 3

Other information
- Mixed martial arts record from Sherdog

Akira Kikuchi (Japanese: 菊地昭, Kikuchi Akira; born July 23, 1978) is a Japanese retired mixed martial artist and a former Shooto Welterweight (76 kg) Champion. He trained alongside Norifumi "Kid" Yamamoto with the Killer Bee team.

== Career ==
After a background in judo, Kikuchi began his mixed martial arts career in the Shooto leagues. As an amateur, Kikuchi won the 2001 All-Japan Shooto Championship. Turning professional, Kikuchi defeated his first five opponents in the organization and one additional opponent in Hawaii's SuperBrawl. He suffered his first loss in August 2003 to American Jake Shields in a bout that would determine a contender for the vacant Shooto Welterweight Championship; Shields went on to become the first Welterweight Champion in Shooto since 2001. Kikuchi met Shields in a rematch in December 2004 and was victorious in a unanimous judges' decision, becoming the Welterweight Champion.

Following the route of training partner Norifumi Yamamoto, Kikuchi debuted in the K-1 HERO'S promotion in July 2005, defeating Katsuya Inoue by first-round technical knockout. Kikuchi would secure another victory in HERO'S, overcoming a knockdown to take a decision over former Pancrase Welterweight Champion Kiuma Kunioku before returning to Shooto the next year.

Kikuchi was defeated in his first title defense against Shinya Aoki at Shooto: Victory of the Truth in February 2006, and controversy following the bout would result in the Killer Bee gym's suspension from Shooto. Norifumi Yamamoto, a key member of Killer Bee, allegedly struck and verbally assaulted a Shooto official. The official, who was examining a laceration on Kikuchi's face from the title bout immediately prior to the incident, appeared before the International Shooto Commission. In the hearings, Yamamoto apologized for the incident, and Killer Bee was relieved of the suspension six months later. Due to the suspension length, Kikuchi fought only once more in 2006.

On February 17, 2007, exactly one year after their first encounter, Kikuchi and Shinya Aoki met for a second time in the Professional Shooto league. Aoki, the champion, defeated Kikuchi and defended the Shooto Welterweight Championship by split judges' decision.

In January 2007, it was announced that Kikuchi was entered into a welterweight tournament to be held by the World Wide Cage Network. The WWCN anticipated that the tournament champion will be sent to compete among the Ultimate Fighting Championship's welterweight roster. Kikuchi's first bout in the tournament, against Jared Rollins, was scheduled for March 17 in Tokyo. Kikuchi was victorious in a second-round technical knockout, advancing him to the next round of the tournament. In the semi-finals of the tournament, Kikuchi fought fellow Shooto veteran Yoshiyuki Yoshida. In what was seen as an upset, Yoshida was victorious in a first-round technical knockout due to strikes on the ground.

In early 2008, Kikuchi announced his retirement from mixed martial arts.

== Mixed martial arts record ==
Professional record breakdown
20 matches	16 wins	4 losses
By knockout	5	1
By submission	7	0
By decision	4	3

Res.	Record	Opponent	Method	Event	Date	Round	Time	Location	Notes
Loss	16-4	Yoshiyuki Yoshida	TKO (elbows)	Greatest Common Multiple: Cage Force 4	September 8, 2007	1	4:33	Tokyo, Japan	
Win	16-3	Ju Pyo Hong	TKO (punches)	Greatest Common Multiple: Cage Force 3	June 9, 2007	1	3:06	Tokyo, Japan	
Win	15-3	Jared Rollins	TKO (punches)	Greatest Common Multiple: Cage Force 2	March 17, 2007	2	1:34	Tokyo, Japan	
Loss	14-3	Shinya Aoki	Decision (split)	Shooto: Back To Our Roots 1	February 17, 2007	3	5:00	Yokohama, Japan	For Shooto Welterweight Championship
Win	14-2	Ronald Jhun	Submission (armlock)	Shooto: Champion Carnival	October 14, 2006	1	1:58	Yokohama, Japan	
Loss	13-2	Shinya Aoki	Decision (unanimous)	Shooto: The Victory of the Truth	February 17, 2006	3	5:00	Tokyo, Japan	Lost Shooto Welterweight Championship
Win	13-1	Kiuma Kunioku	Decision (unanimous)	K-1 Hero's 3	September 7, 2005	3	5:00	Tokyo, Japan	
Win	12-1	Katsuya Inoue	TKO (punches)	K-1 Hero's 2	July 6, 2005	1	1:41	Tokyo, Japan	
Win	11-1	Jason Brudvik	TKO (punches)	Shooto: 4/23 in Hakata Star Lanes	April 23, 2005	1	2:32	Fukuoka, Japan	
Win	10-1	Jake Shields	Decision (unanimous)	Shooto: Year End Show 2004	December 14, 2004	3	5:00	Tokyo, Japan	Won Shooto Welterweight Championship
Win	9-1	Ramunas Komas	Submission (armbar)	Shooto: 9/26 in Kourakuen Hall	September 26, 2004	2	2:21	Tokyo, Japan	
Win	8-1	Jutaro Nakao	Decision (majority)	Shooto 2004: 5/3 in Korakuen Hall	May 3, 2004	3	5:00	Tokyo, Japan	
Win	7-1	Sammy Morgan	Submission (armbar)	Shooto: 3/4 in Kitazawa Town Hall	March 4, 2004	1	2:51	Tokyo, Japan	
Loss	6-1	Jake Shields	Decision (unanimous)	Shooto: 8/10 in Yokohama Cultural Gymnasium	August 10, 2003	3	5:00	Yokohama, Japan	
Win	6-0	Seichi Ikemoto	Submission (armbar)	Shooto 2003: 6/27 in Hiroshima Sun Plaza	June 27, 2003	2	1:28	Hiroshima, Japan	
Win	5-0	Toru Nakayama	TKO (punches)	Shooto: 2/23 in Korakuen Hall	February 23, 2003	1	2:53	Tokyo, Japan	
Win	4-0	Kolo Koka	Submission (keylock)	SuperBrawl 27	November 9, 2002	1	3:09	Honolulu, Hawaii, United States	
Win	3-0	Shigetoshi Iwase	Decision (unanimous)	Shooto: Treasure Hunt 9	July 27, 2002	2	5:00	Tokyo, Japan	
Win	2-0	Jani Lax	Submission (kimura)	Shooto: Wanna Shooto 2002	April 14, 2002	1	2:51	Tokyo, Japan	
Win	1-0	Yoichi Fukumoto	Submission (armbar)	Shooto: Treasure Hunt 2	January 25, 2002	1	3:18	Tokyo, Japan	

== See also ==
- List of male mixed martial artists

== References and footnotes ==
Preceded by Jake Shields	Shooto Welterweight champion December 14, 2004 – February 17, 2006	Succeeded by Shinya Aoki
