= Dream 7 =

Mixed martial arts event in 2009

Dream.7: Feather Weight Grandprix 2009 1st Round
- The poster for Dream.7: Feather Weight Grandprix 2009 1st Round
- Promotion: Dream
- Date: March 8, 2009
- Venue: Saitama Super Arena
- City: Saitama, Japan
- Attendance: 19,528

Event chronology
| Dream.6: Middle Weight Grandprix Final Round | Dream.7: Feather Weight Grandprix 2009 1st Round | Dream.8: Welter Weight Grandprix 2009 1st Round |

Dream.7: Feather Weight Grandprix 2009 1st Round was a mixed martial arts event promoted by Fighting and Entertainment Group's (FEG) mixed martial arts promotion Dream on March 8, 2009. This event featured six of the opening round fights of the tournament which is contested at a 63 kg (139 lb) weight limit.

== Event ==
The event consisted of nine mixed martial arts bout, all contested under Dream's MMA rules. Six of the bouts were part of Dream's 2009 Featherweight Grand Prix, with the remaining bout of the tournament's opening round (DJ Taiki's fight with Hideo Tokoro) taking place at Dream.8 due to DJ Taiki being injured. Norifumi "Kid" Yamamoto who is also participating in the tournament was given a first-round bye by FEG so he could recover from an ankle injury he received in 2008.

== Results ==
Main Card
| Weight class | | | | Method | Round | Time | Notes |
|---|---|---|---|---|---|---|---|
| Lightweight | Tatsuya Kawajiri | def. | Ross Ebanez | Submission (Rear-Naked Choke) | 1 | 4:03 |
| Welterweight | Shinya Aoki | def. | David Gardner | Submission (Rear-Naked Choke) | 1 | 5:58 |
| Lightweight | Mitsuhiro Ishida | def. | Daisuke Nakamura | Decision (Unanimous) | 2 | 5:00 |
Featherweight Grandprix 1st round
| Featherweight | Masakazu Imanari | def. | Atsushi Yamamoto | Decision (Split) | 2 | 5:00 |
| Featherweight | Hiroyuki Takaya | def. | Jong Won Kim | TKO (Punches) | 2 | 0:40 |
| Featherweight | Yoshiro Maeda | def. | Micah Miller | Decision (Unanimous) | 2 | 5:00 |
| Featherweight | Abel Cullum | def. | Akiyo Nishiura | Decision (Unanimous) | 2 | 5:00 |
| Featherweight | Joe Warren | def. | Chase Beebe | TKO (Doctor Stoppage) | 1 | 10:00 |
| Featherweight | Bibiano Fernandes | def. | Takafumi Otsuka | Decision (Unanimous) | 2 | 5:00 |

== See also ==
- Dream (mixed martial arts)
- List of Dream champions
- 2009 in DREAM
