= Finnfight =

Mixed martial arts promoter based in Turku, Finland

Finnfight or Scandinavian open NHB Championships (SNC) was an annual mixed martial arts competition in Turku, Finland. Contrary to most other mixed martial arts organizations and competitions, elbow strikes, knee strikes, and headbutts from any position were legal.

The first Finnfight event, FINNFIGHT 1, was held in 1998 at Rantasipi Hotelli (currently called Caribia Hotel), Turku, and featured fighters from Finland and Sweden.

FinnFight's last event, FinnFight 10, took place on December 6, 2008 and was the promotion's 10th event.

== Rules ==
(Translated extract from www.finnfightersgym.fi)

The fights took place in a ring or arena, which had a padded floor to increase the safety of the fighters. The bouts were 10 minutes long, with no round breaks. During the length of the bout, there was a referee in the competition area, who oversaw the rules. The referee had the right to stop the bout if necessary. The referee's decision was final. Protests led to the disqualification of the fighter.

=== Ways to win ===
- Knockout (KO)
- Submission (tapout, TO)
- Referee stoppage (TKO)
- Doctor stoppage (TKO)
- Cornerman stoppage (TKO)
- Disqualification for breaking the rules
- After the full bout time (10 minutes), three judges decide the winner (Criteria: stand-up, takedowns, ground techniques and fighting spirit)

=== Fouls ===
- Pushing fingers into the opponent's eyes, mouth, ears, or groin area.
- Biting.
- Grabbing the ropes.
- Strikes to the throat.
- Kicks while wearing shoes (allowed shoes are boxing- or wrestling shoes).
- Usage of doping or illegal substances.
- Small joint manipulation.
- Stomping or soccer kicking the head of a downed opponent while the other fighter is still standing.
- Strikes to the groin.
- Throwing or pushing the opponent out of the competition area.
- Unsportsmanlike conduct.

=== Equipment and other information ===
- Grappling-model gloves are supplied by the competition hosts.
- Groin protection is compulsory.
- Mouthguard is compulsory.
- Wrestling- or boxing-shoes are allowed, but the fighter using shoes is not allowed to kick the opponent.
- The fighter can wear, for instance, a gi, wrestling outfit, or shorts.
- The fighter can also wear protective equipment according to their particular style (knee or leg pads).
- Application of any kinds of lubricative substances on any body part except the face is disallowed.
- The fighters are subject to a medical exam both before and after the bouts.

== Weight divisions ==
Weigh-ins took place at the day of the competition (6h before).

Weight class	Upper weight limit
Lightweight	70 kg (154.3 lb; 11.0 st)
Welterweight	80 kg (176.4 lb; 12.6 st)
Middleweight	90 kg (198.4 lb; 14.2 st)
Heavyweight	Unlimited

== Notable fighters ==
- Alexander Gustafsson http://www.sherdog.com/fighter/Alexander-Gustafsson-26162
- Joachim Hansen (fighter) http://www.sherdog.com/fighter/Joachim-Hansen-3177
- Jari Heiskanen http://www.sherdog.com/fighter/Jari-Heiskanen-4188
- Jon-Olav Einemo http://www.sherdog.com/fighter/John-Olav-Einemo-2873
- Tom Niinimäki http://www.sherdog.com/fighter/Tom-Niinimaki-5639
- David Bielkheden http://www.sherdog.com/fighter/David-Bielkheden-3863
- Per Eklund http://www.sherdog.com/fighter/Per-Eklund-3707
- Tor Troeng http://www.sherdog.com/fighter/Tor-Troeng-6850
- Mikkel Guldbæk http://www.sherdog.com/fighter/Mikkel-Guldbaek-4311
- Assan Njie http://www.sherdog.com/fighter/Assan-Njie-6858
- Sauli Heilimö http://www.sherdog.com/fighter/Sauli-Heilimo-3709
- Jani Lax http://www.sherdog.com/fighter/Jani-Lax-2940
- Timo-Juhani Hirvikangas http://www.sherdog.com/fighter/TimoJuhani-Hirvikangas-41510
- Ykä Leino http://www.sherdog.com/fighter/Yka-Leino-2943
- Mikko Suvanto http://www.sherdog.com/fighter/Mikko-Suvanto-13935
- Jacob Lovstad http://www.sherdog.com/fighter/Jakob-Lovstad-4922
- Toni Linden
- Blazej Sawinski
- Tyrone Washington
- Olof Inger
- Jason Fields
- Jarmo Haimakainen
- Derek Renquist
- Hans Ersson
- Peder Söderlind
