= 2026 in UFC =

Mixed martial arts events

Information
- First date: January 24, 2026
- Last date: TBD

Events
- Total events: TBD
- UFC: TBD
- TUF Finale events: TBD

Fights
- Total fights: TBD
- Title fights: TBD

Chronology
2025 in UFC	2026 in UFC	2027 in UFC

The year 2026 is the 34th year in the history of the Ultimate Fighting Championship (UFC), a mixed martial arts promotion based in the United States.

== UFC in 2026 ==
=== Class action: anti-trust lawsuits ===
==== Johnson v. Zuffa ====
Based on court filings from late July 2025, the Johnson v. Zuffa antitrust lawsuit, originally filed in 2021, is proceeding, and status conference for the case is scheduled for late August 2025.

==== Cirkunovs v. Zuffa and Davis v. Zuffa ====
In May 2025, two antitrust lawsuits were filed against the UFC. One, led by former fighter Misha Cirkunov, specifically challenges the enforceability of arbitration clauses and class action waivers in UFC contracts. The other lawsuit, filed by former fighter Phil Davis, alleges that the UFC's anticompetitive practices also negatively impacted the ability of non-UFC fighters to secure fair wages.

=== Paramount and CBS partnership ===
On August 11, 2025, the UFC announced a seven-year media rights agreement with Paramount Skydance Corporation worth $7.7 billion. Paramount+ will exclusively stream all events for seven years, starting in 2026. Some numbered events will also air on CBS. The agreement will allow the UFC to move away from pay-per-view as events will stream on Paramount+ at no additional cost. All 13 of the UFC's flagship events and 30 Fight Nights a year will be streamed on the Paramount+ service. UFC CEO and President Dana White announced the UFC would produce four big events per year on CBS, and that the UFC's planned card for the White House on June 14, 2026, would be one of those events.

=== White House event ===
To commemorate the 250th anniversary of the United States, the UFC held a historic mixed martial arts event entitled UFC Freedom 250 on the grounds of the White House in June 2026, marking the first professional sporting event ever staged at the presidential residence.

The event was first announced by US President Donald Trump on July 3, 2025, during a rally at the Iowa State Fairgrounds: On August 29, 2025, UFC CEO Dana White confirmed via social media that plans for the event had been finalized, stating, "We had the meeting at the White House... The White House fight is on."

On October 6, 2025, President Trump announced that the event would take place on June 14, 2026, coinciding with his 80th birthday.

=== Post‑Fight bonus increases ===
Beginning in January 2026, starting with UFC 324, the UFC increased its post‑fight bonus structure, raising Performance of the Night and Fight of the Night awards from $50,000 to $100,000, and introducing additional $25,000 bonuses for any knockout or submission not selected among the standard four post‑fight awards.

=== New rankings system ===
The UFC introduced official rankings in February 2013 using a weekly media voting panel. On June 20, 2026, the promotion began replacing that system with the Meta UFC Rankings, an Elo‑based mathematical model designed to prioritize objectivity through factors such as opponent quality, activity, and decay for long layoffs or outdated wins. The new framework removes pound‑for‑pound rankings and minimizes human involvement, with the media panel continuing only during a transition period.

== Releases and retirements ==
These fighters have either been released from their UFC contracts, announced their retirement, or joined other promotions:

Month	Day	ISO	Fighter	Division	Reason	Ref
January	9	(United Arab Emirates)	Mohammad Yahya	Featherweight	Released	
January	23	(United States)	Tecia Pennington	Women's Strawweight	Retired	
January	28	(United States)	Darrius Flowers	Welterweight	Released	
January	29	(United States)	Patchy Mix	Bantamweight	Signed with Rizin FF	
February	5	(New Zealand)	Aaron Tau	Flyweight	Released	
February	5	(Brazil)	Rafael Cerqueira	Light Heavyweight	Released	
February	10	(United States)	Alex Morono	Welterweight	Released	
February	10	(Afghanistan)	Javid Basharat	Bantamweight	Contract expired	
February	11	(Brazil)	Lucas Almeida	Featherweight	Released	
February	11	(Brazil)	Jailton Almeida	Heavyweight	Released	
February	13	(United States)	Adam Fugitt	Welterweight	Released	
February	13	(Nigeria)	Mohammed Usman	Heavyweight	Released	
February	20	(United States)	AJ Cunningham	Bantamweight	Retired	
February	25	(England)	Nathan Fletcher	Bantamweight	Re-signed with Cage Warriors	
February	25	(Mexico)	Gianni Vázquez	Bantamweight	Released	
February	27	(Canada)	Gavin Tucker	Featherweight	Retired	
March	2	(Brazil)	Felipe Bunes	Flyweight	Released	
March	2	(Bolivia)	José Medina	Middleweight	Released	
March	10	(United States)	Philip Rowe	Welterweight	Released	
March	11	(Venezuela)	Erik Silva	Featherweight	Released	
March	11	(United States)	Kris Moutinho	Bantamweight	Released	
March	14	(United States)	Eryk Anders	Middleweight	Retired	
March	26	(Brazil)	Luan Lacerda	Bantamweight	Released	
March	26	(Mexico)	Montserrat Rendon	Women's Bantamweight	Released	
March	28	(United States)	Michael Chiesa	Welterweight	Retired	
March	28	(United States)	Niko Price	Welterweight	Retired	(Note: Returned at UFC Fight Night 290 and retired a second time.)
April	1	(Brazil)	Antonio Trócoli	Middleweight	Released	
April	1	(Brazil)	Bruna Brasil	Women's Strawweight	Released	
April	1	(Brazil)	Luana Carolina	Women's Bantamweight	Released	
April	11	(United States)	Cub Swanson	Featherweight	Retired	
April	18	(Brazil)	Gilbert Burns	Welterweight	Retired	
April	21	(Brazil)	Pedro Munhoz	Bantamweight	Released	
April	21	(England)	Shaqueme Rock	Lightweight	Released	
May	18	(New Zealand)	Brad Riddell	Lightweight	Released	
May	18	(Brazil)	Mayra Bueno Silva	Women's Bantamweight	Released	
May	18	(United States)	Colby Covington	Welterweight	Retired	
May	22	(Spain)	Daniel Barez	Flyweight	Released	
May	22	(Brazil)	Ketlen Vieira	Women's Bantamweight	Released	
May	22	(Croatia)	Ivan Erslan	Light Heavyweight	Released	
May	22	(England)	Tuco Tokkos	Light Heavyweight	Released	
May	22	(Zimbabwe)	Themba Gorimbo	Welterweight	Retired	
May	27	(United States)	Austen Lane	Heavyweight	Retired	
May	27	(Mexico)	Jesús Santos Aguilar	Flyweight	Released	
May	28	(United States)	Max Griffin	Welterweight	Released	
May	30	(Peru)	Daniel Marcos	Bantamweight	Contract Concluded	
May	30	(United States)	Vince Morales	Bantamweight	Released	
May	30	(Australia)	Jamie Mullarkey	Lightweight	Released	
May	30	(United States)	Lando Vannata	Lightweight	Released	
May	31	(Sweden)	Andreas Gustafsson	Welterweight	Released	
June	7	(United States)	Matt Schnell	Flyweight	Retired	
June	18	(United States)	Cameron Smotherman	Bantamweight	Released	
June	18	(Brazil)	Ariane Carnelossi	Women's Strawweight	Released	
June	18	(Brazil)	Thiago Moisés	Lightweight	Released	
June	24	(Guyana)	Carlston Harris	Welterweight	Released	
June	30	(United States)	Trey Waters	Welterweight	Signed with PFL	
July	14	(Brazil)	Michel Pereira	Middleweight	Contract concluded	
July	14	(United States)	Sedriques Dumas	Middleweight	Released	
July	17	(United States)	Victor Martinez	Lightweight	Released	
July	17	(Mexico)	Irene Aldana	Women's Bantamweight	Retired	
August	1	(United States)	Hailey Cowan	Women's Bantamweight	Retired	
August	3	(Brazil)	Allan Nascimento	Flyweight	Passed away	
August	8	(Australia)	Stewart Nicoll	Flyweight	Released	
August	8	(United States)	Darren Elkins	Featherweight	Retired	
August	11	(Romania)	Daniel Frunza	Welterweight	Signed with LFA	
August	12	(Mexico)	Jessie Rosas	Featherweight	Released	
August	12	(United States)	Cody Gibson	Bantamweight	Released	
August	12	(Kazakhstan)	Bekzat Almakhan	Bantamweight	Released	
August	12	(China)	Shayilan Nuerdanbieke	Featherweight	Requested his release	
August	15	(Brazil)	Edson Barboza	Lightweight	Retired	
August	21	(Brazil)	Ravena Oliveira	Women's Flyweight	Released	
September	5	(China)	Aori Qileng	Bantamweight	Released	
September	7	(England)	Michael Page	Middleweight	Contract concluded	
September	10	(Brazil)	Bruno Lopes	Light Heavyweight	Released	
September	17	(United States)	Lyman Good	Welterweight	Released	
September	17	(Russia)	Saygid Izagakhmaev	Welterweight	Released	
October	3	(United States)	Court McGee	Welterweight	Retired	
October	10	(United States)	Gerald Meerschaert	Middleweight	Retired	
October	12	(Brazil)	Ismael Bonfim	Lightweight	Released	
October	14	(Islamic Republic of Afghanistan)	Farid Basharat	Bantamweight	Contract concluded	
October	16	(Tajikistan)	Muhammad Naimov	Featherweight	Released	
October	16	(United States)	Dennis Buzukja	Featherweight	Released	
October	31	(United States)	Julian Erosa	Featherweight	Retired	
November	10	(Brazil)	Norma Dumont	Women's Bantamweight	Released	
November	14	(United States)	Stephen Thompson	Welterweight	Retired	
November	18	(Brazil)	Virna Jandiroba	Women's Strawweight	Released	
November	18	(Brazil)	Wellington Turman	Middleweight	Released	
November	18	(United States)	Ryan Hall	Featherweight	Released	
November	20	(South Korea)	Lee Jeong-yeong	Featherweight	Retired	
November	20	(Brazil)	Douglas Silva de Andrade	Featherweight	Released	
November	20	(Georgia (country))	Giga Chikadze	Featherweight	Released	
November	20	(France)	William Gomis	Featherweight	Released	
November	21	(United States)	Brian Ortega	Featherweight	Retired	

== Debut UFC fighters ==
The following fighters fought their first UFC fight in 2026:

Month	Day	ISO	Fighter	Division	Event	Ref
January	24	(United States)	Ty Miller	Welterweight	UFC 324	
February	1	(Australia)	Dom Mar Fan	Lightweight	UFC 325	
February	1	(South Korea)	Kim Sang-wook	Lightweight	UFC 325	
February	1	(Japan)	Keiichiro Nakamura	Featherweight	UFC 325	
February	1	(Australia)	Sebastian Szalay	Featherweight	UFC 325	
February	1	(New Zealand)	Lawrence Lui	Bantamweight	UFC 325	
February	1	(China)	Sulang Rangbo	Bantamweight	UFC 325	
February	7	(Mexico)	Gianni Vázquez	Bantamweight	UFC Fight Night 266	
February	21	(United States)	Jean-Paul Lebosnoyani	Welterweight	UFC Fight Night 267	
February	21	(United States)	Josiah Harrell	Welterweight	UFC Fight Night 267	
February	28	(Aruba)	Damian Pinas	Middleweight	UFC Fight Night 268	
February	28	(United States)	Wesley Schultz	Middleweight	UFC Fight Night 268	
February	28	(Mexico)	Regina Tarín	Women's Flyweight	UFC Fight Night 268	
February	28	(Colombia)	Javier Reyes	Featherweight	UFC Fight Night 268	
February	28	(Brazil)	Ryan Gandra	Middleweight	UFC Fight Night 268	
February	28	(Mexico)	Imanol Rodríguez	Flyweight	UFC Fight Night 268	
March	7	(United States)	Luke Fernandez	Light Heavyweight	UFC 326	
March	7	(Brazil)	Rafael Tobias	Light Heavyweight	UFC 326	
March	7	(Venezuela)	Alberto Montes	Featherweight	UFC 326	
March	14	(Spain)	Hecher Sosa	Bantamweight	UFC Fight Night 269	
March	14	(Brazil)	Manoel Sousa	Lightweight	UFC Fight Night 269	
March	14	(Morocco)	Marwan Rahiki	Featherweight	UFC Fight Night 269	
March	21	(England)	Shanelle Dyer	Women's Strawweight	UFC Fight Night 270	
March	21	(Lithuania)	Mantas Kondratavičius	Middleweight	UFC Fight Night 270	
March	21	(Brazil)	Felipe Franco	Heavyweight	UFC Fight Night 270	
March	21	(Belgium)	Losene Keita	Featherweight	UFC Fight Night 270	
March	21	(England)	Kurtis Campbell	Featherweight	UFC Fight Night 270	
March	28	(United States)	Tyrell Fortune	Heavyweight	UFC Fight Night 271	
March	28	(Brazil)	Lerryan Douglas	Featherweight	UFC Fight Night 271	
April	4	(United States)	Dakota Hope	Lightweight	UFC Fight Night 272	
April	4	(Brazil)	José Mauro Delano	Featherweight	UFC Fight Night 272	
April	4	(United States)	Tommy McMillen	Featherweight	UFC Fight Night 272	
April	18	(Canada)	Jamie Siraj	Bantamweight	UFC Fight Night 273	
April	18	(Russia)	Mark Vologdin	Bantamweight	UFC Fight Night 273	
April	18	(Turkey)	Gökhan Saricam	Heavyweight	UFC Fight Night 273	
April	18	(Canada)	Julien Leblanc	Middleweight	UFC Fight Night 273	
April	18	(Brazil)	Márcio Barbosa	Featherweight	UFC Fight Night 273	
April	18	(Canada)	Mandel Nallo	Lightweight	UFC Fight Night 273	
April	25	(United States)	Lucas Brennan	Lightweight	UFC Fight Night 274	
April	25	(Chile)	Victor Valenzuela	Welterweight	UFC Fight Night 274	
April	25	(Ecuador)	Adrián Luna Martinetti	Bantamweight	UFC Fight Night 274	
May	2	(Australia)	Ben Johnston	Middleweight	UFC Fight Night 275	
May	2	(New Zealand)	Ollie Schmid	Featherweight	UFC Fight Night 275	
May	16	(United States)	Thomas Gantt	Lightweight	UFC Fight Night 276	
May	16	(Ukraine)	Artur Minev	Lightweight	UFC Fight Night 276	
May	16	(United States)	Christian Edwards	Light Heavyweight	UFC Fight Night 276	
May	16	(Peru)	Juan Díaz	Bantamweight	UFC Fight Night 276	
May	30	(Peru)	Rodrigo Vera	Featherweight	UFC Fight Night 277	
May	30	(China)	Zhu Kangjie	Featherweight	UFC Fight Night 277	
May	30	(China)	Xiong Jingnan	Women's Strawweight	UFC Fight Night 277	
May	30	(China)	Ding Meng	Welterweight	UFC Fight Night 277	
May	30	(Brazil)	José Henrique Souza	Welterweight	UFC Fight Night 277	
May	30	(Brazil)	Luis Felipe Dias	Middleweight	UFC Fight Night 277	
May	30	(South Korea)	Lee Yi-sak	Middleweight	UFC Fight Night 277	
June	6	(Brazil)	Jeisla Chaves	Women's Flyweight	UFC Fight Night 278	
June	20	(United States)	Shane Collins	Featherweight	UFC Fight Night 279	
June	20	(Georgia (country))	Otari Tanzilovi	Featherweight	UFC Fight Night 279	
June	20	(Georgia (country))	Levan Chokheli	Welterweight	UFC Fight Night 279	
June	20	(United States)	Leon Shahbazyan	Welterweight	UFC Fight Night 279	
June	20	(Kyrgyzstan)	Murtazali Magomedov	Featherweight	UFC Fight Night 279	
June	27	(Azerbaijan)	Tahir Abdullayev	Welterweight	UFC Fight Night 280	
June	27	(Brazil)	Jefferson Nascimento	Welterweight	UFC Fight Night 280	
June	27	(Sweden)	Theodor Berggren	Welterweight	UFC Fight Night 280	
June	27	(Azerbaijan)	Farman Hasanov	Welterweight	UFC Fight Night 280	
July	11	(United States)	John Garza	Bantamweight	UFC 329	
July	11	(United States)	Gable Steveson	Heavyweight	UFC 329	
July	18	(United States)	Anna Melisano	Women's Flyweight	UFC Fight Night 281	
July	18	(United States)	RJ Harris	Heavyweight	UFC Fight Night 281	
July	18	(United States)	Damien Anderson	Featherweight	UFC Fight Night 281	
July	18	(United States)	Ezra Elliott	Featherweight	UFC Fight Night 281	
July	18	(Brazil)	Levi Rodrigues Jr.	Light Heavyweight	UFC Fight Night 281	
July	25	(Finland)	Abdul Hussein	Bantamweight	UFC Fight Night 282	
July	25	(Russia)	Magomed Tuchalov	Light Heavyweight	UFC Fight Night 282	
July	25	(Russia)	Muhammad Saidov	Light Heavyweight	UFC Fight Night 282	
July	25	(Russia)	Abubakar Vagaev	Welterweight	UFC Fight Night 282	
July	25	(Russia)	Magomed Zaynukov	Lightweight	UFC Fight Night 282	
July	25	(Poland)	Damian Rzepecki	Lightweight	UFC Fight Night 282	
August	1	(Serbia)	Marina Spasić	Women's Strawweight	UFC Fight Night 283	
August	1	(Serbia)	Jovan Leka	Heavyweight	UFC Fight Night 283	
August	1	(Germany)	Alexander Poppeck	Heavyweight	UFC Fight Night 283	
August	1	(Serbia)	Nina Nikolija Milošević	Women's Bantamweight	UFC Fight Night 283	
August	1	(Serbia)	Borislav Nikolić	Bantamweight	UFC Fight Night 283	
August	1	(Brazil)	Michael Oliveira	Welterweight	UFC Fight Night 283	
August	1	(Montenegro)	Miloš Janičić	Lightweight	UFC Fight Night 283	
August	1	(France)	Noah Gugnon	Lightweight	UFC Fight Night 283	
August	1	(Serbia)	Vlasto Čepo	Middleweight	UFC Fight Night 283	
August	8	(Brazil)	Giovanna Canuto	Women's Strawweight	UFC Fight Night 284	
August	8	(Brazil)	Carol Foro	Women's Strawweight	UFC Fight Night 284	
August	8	(United States)	Richie Miranda	Lightweight	UFC Fight Night 284	
August	8	(Brazil)	José Luiz	Heavyweight	UFC Fight Night 284	
August	15	(Brazil)	Lucas Fernando	Light Heavyweight	UFC 330	
August	15	(Brazil)	Eduardo Henrique	Flyweight	UFC 330	
August	22	(United States)	Stanley Dorsainvil	Lightweight	UFC Fight Night 285	
August	22	(United States)	Ryan Kuse	Featherweight	UFC Fight Night 285	
August	22	(United States)	Anthony Wint	Heavyweight	UFC Fight Night 285	
August	22	(United States)	Terrance Chatman	Heavyweight	UFC Fight Night 285	
August	28	(China)	Yilizhati Maimaitijiang	Middleweight	Road to UFC Season 5: Semifinals	
August	29	(Canada)	Cameron Nelson	Welterweight	UFC Fight Night 286	
August	29	(Brazil)	Hector Santiago	Bantamweight	UFC Fight Night 286	
August	29	(Italy)	Francesco Nuzzi	Bantamweight	UFC Fight Night 286	
August	29	(Mongolia)	Namsrai Batbayar	Flyweight	UFC Fight Night 286	
August	29	(Indonesia)	Bilal Hasan	Flyweight	UFC Fight Night 286	
August	29	(Peru)	Nilson Rojas	Flyweight	UFC Fight Night 286	
August	29	(China)	Liu Ce	Light Heavyweight	UFC Fight Night 286	
September	5	(Argentina)	Sofia Montenegro	Women's Strawweight	UFC Fight Night 287	
September	5	(France)	Delphine Benouaich	Women's Strawweight	UFC Fight Night 287	
September	5	(France)	Matthieu Letho Duclos	Middleweight	UFC Fight Night 287	
September	5	(France)	Michael Aljarouj	Flyweight	UFC Fight Night 287	
September	5	(Spain)	Fabià Sintes	Flyweight	UFC Fight Night 287	
September	5	(Moldova)	Pavel Andrusca	Featherweight	UFC Fight Night 287	
September	5	(France)	Salahdine Parnasse	Lightweight	UFC Fight Night 287	
September	12	(Mexico)	Jessie Rosas	Featherweight	UFC Fight Night 288	
September	12	(United States)	Sean King III	Featherweight	UFC Fight Night 288	
September	26	(Brazil)	Valesca Machado	Women's Strawweight	UFC Fight Night 289	
September	26	(United States)	Melissa Amaya	Women's Strawweight	UFC Fight Night 289	
September	26	(Kyrgyzstan)	Ilimbek Akylbek Uulu	Bantamweight	UFC Fight Night 289	
September	26	(Azerbaijan)	Mehemmedeli Osmanli	Bantamweight	UFC Fight Night 289	
September	26	(United States)	Luis Hernandez	Light Heavyweight	UFC Fight Night 289	
October	3	(United States)	Bruce Whitehead	Welterweight	UFC 332	
October	3	(United States)	Lucas Armand	Heavyweight	UFC 332	
October	3	(United States)	Anthony Romero	Featherweight	UFC 332	
October	3	(Croatia)	Roberto Soldić	Welterweight	UFC 332	
October	17	(Canada)	Cody Chovancek	Bantamweight	UFC Fight Night 292	
October	17	(United States)	Mackenzie Stiller	Women's Flyweight	UFC Fight Night 292	
October	17	(United States)	Joel Faglier	Heavyweight	UFC Fight Night 292	
October	17	(Canada)	Javad Mahjoub	Heavyweight	UFC Fight Night 292	
October	17	(United States)	Nick Galanti	Middleweight	UFC Fight Night 292	
October	17	(Canada)	Louis Jourdain	Bantamweight	UFC Fight Night 292	
October	17	(Mexico)	Cristian Pérez	Lightweight	UFC Fight Night 292	
October	24	(Azerbaijan)	Asaf Chopurov	Bantamweight	UFC 333	
October	31	(Slovakia)	Lucia Szabová	Women's Flyweight	UFC Fight Night 292	
October	31	(United States)	Joseph Kropschot	Middleweight	UFC Fight Night 292	
November	7	(United States)	Carlos Calderon	Featherweight	UFC Fight Night 293	
November	7	(Brazil)	Gabriel Lorenço	Heavyweight	UFC Fight Night 293	
November	7	(Brazil)	Marcos Degli	Flyweight	UFC Fight Night 293	
November	14	(Brazil)	Samuel Sanches	Lightweight	UFC 334	
November	21	(England)	Shoaib Yousaf	Lightweight	UFC Fight Night 294	
November	21	(Republic of Ireland)	John Mitchell	Lightweight	UFC Fight Night 294	
November	21	(United States)	Alik Lorenz	Light Heavyweight	UFC Fight Night 294	

== Suspended fighters ==
The list below is based on fighters suspended either by (1) United States Anti-Doping Agency (USADA) or World Anti-Doping Agency (WADA) for violation of taking prohibited substances or non-analytical incidents, (2) by local commissions on misconduct during the fights or at event venues, or (3) by the UFC for reasons also stated below.

ISO	Name	Nickname	Division	From	Duration	Tested positive for / Info	By	Eligible to fight again	Ref.	Notes
(Republic of Ireland)	Conor McGregor	Notorious	Lightweight	September 20, 2024	18 months	Three anti-doping whereabout failures on June 13, September 19, and September 20, 2024.	CSAD	March 20, 2026		
(Uzbekistan)	Ramazan Temirov	Temurlan	Flyweight	July 5, 2025	1 year	Trimetazidine	CSAD	July 5, 2026		
(Nigeria)	Mohammed Usman	The Motor	Heavyweight	October 9, 2025	30 months	Testosterone and BPC-157	CSAD	April 9, 2028		Removed from the UFC Roster on February 12, 2026
(Brazil)	Iasmin Lucindo		Women's Strawweight	September 24, 2025	9 months	Mesterolone	CSAD	June 24, 2026		
(Brazil)	Levi Rodrigues		Light Heavyweight	October 14, 2025	9 months	Nandrolone	NSAC	July 14, 2026		
(Kazakhstan)	Alibi Idiris		Flyweight	February 21, 2026	12 months	Hydrochlorothiazide	CSAD	February 21, 2027		Result vs. Ode Osbourne overturned.
(United States)	Bassil Hafez	The Habibi	Welterweight	March 20, 2026	12 months	Ipamorelin	CSAD	March 20, 2027		
(Switzerland)	Volkan Oezdemir	No Time	Light Heavyweight	February 16, 2026	16 months	Erythropoietin	CSAD	June 17, 2027		
(France)	Manon Fiorot	The Beast	Women's Flyweight	October 19, 2026	3 months	Ostarine	CSAD	January 19, 2027		

== The Ultimate Fighter ==
The following The Ultimate Fighter season is scheduled for broadcast in 2026:

Season	Division	Winner	Runner-up	Ref
The Ultimate Fighter 34	Bantamweight	Ilimbek Akylbek Uulu	Mehemmedeli Osmanli	
The Ultimate Fighter 34	Women's Strawweight	Valesca Machado	Melissa Amaya	

== Title fights ==
Title fights in 2026
Weight class				Method	Round	Time	Event	Notes
Lightweight	Justin Gaethje	def.	Paddy Pimblett	Decision (unanimous) (48–47, 49–46, 49–46)	5	5:00	UFC 324	(Note: For the interim UFC Lightweight Championship.)
Featherweight	Alexander Volkanovski (c)	def.	Diego Lopes	Decision (unanimous) (49–46, 49–46, 50–45)	5	5:00	UFC 325	(Note: For the UFC Featherweight Championship.)
Light Heavyweight	Carlos Ulberg	def.	Jiří Procházka	KO (punches)	1	3:45	UFC 327	(Note: For the vacant UFC Light Heavyweight Championship.)
Flyweight	Joshua Van (c)	def.	Tatsuro Taira	TKO (punches)	5	1:32	UFC 328	(Note: For the UFC Flyweight Championship.)
Heavyweight	Ciryl Gane	def.	Alex Pereira	TKO (punches)	2	1:27	UFC Freedom 250	(Note: For the interim UFC Heavyweight Championship.)
Lightweight	Justin Gaethje (ic)	def.	Ilia Topuria (c)	TKO (corner stoppage)	4	5:00	UFC Freedom 250	(Note: For the UFC Lightweight Championship.)
Women's Strawweight	Mackenzie Dern (c)	def.	Gillian Robertson	Decision (unanimous) (49–46, 49–46, 48–47)	5	5:00	UFC 330	(Note: For the UFC Women's Strawweight Championship.)
Welterweight	Islam Makhachev (c)	def.	Ian Machado Garry	Decision (unanimous) (49–46, 49–46, 48–47)	5	5:00	UFC 330	(Note: For the UFC Welterweight Championship.)
Flyweight	Joshua Van (c)	def.	Alexandre Pantoja	Decision (unanimous) (49–46, 49–47, 50–45)	5	5:00	UFC 331	(Note: For the UFC Flyweight Championship.)
Women's Flyweight	Natália Silva	def.	Wang Cong	Decision (unanimous) (48–47, 48–47, 48–46)	5	5:00	UFC 332	(Note: For the vacant UFC Women's Flyweight Championship.)
Bantamweight	Petr Yan (c)	def.	Merab Dvalishvili	Decision (unanimous) (48–47, 48–47, 48–47)	5	5:00	UFC 333	(Note: For the UFC Bantamweight Championship.)
Featherweight	Alexander Volkanovski (c)	def.	Movsar Evloev	TKO (punches)	2	4:54	UFC 333	(Note: For the UFC Featherweight Championship.)
Women's Bantamweight	Kayla Harrison (c)	def.	Amanda Nunes	Submission (rear-naked choke)	4	1:29	UFC 334	(Note: For the UFC Women's Bantamweight Championship.)
Heavyweight	Ciryl Gane (c)	def.	Josh Hokit	Decision (unanimous) (48–47, 48–47, 48–47)	5	5:00	UFC 334	(Note: For the UFC Heavyweight Championship.)

== Events list ==
=== Scheduled events ===
Event	Date	Venue	City	Country	Ref.
UFC 335: Oliveira vs. Lopes	Dec 12, 2026	T-Mobile Arena	Las Vegas, Nevada	United States	
UFC Fight Night: Adesanya vs. Magomedov	Dec 5, 2026	ANB Arena	Riyadh	Saudi Arabia	

=== Past events ===
#	Event	Date	Venue	City	Country	Atten.	Ref.	Fight of the Night			Performance of the Night		Bonus	Ref.
799	UFC Fight Night: Procházka vs. Stirling	Nov 21, 2026	Ali Bin Hamad al-Attiyah Arena	Al Rayyan	Qatar	—N/a		—N/a			Navajo Stirling	Amir Albazi	$100,000	
799	UFC Fight Night: Procházka vs. Stirling	Nov 21, 2026	Ali Bin Hamad al-Attiyah Arena	Al Rayyan	Qatar	—N/a		—N/a			Diyar Nurgozhay	John Mitchell	$100,000	
798	UFC 334: Gane vs. Hokit	Nov 14, 2026	Madison Square Garden	New York City, New York	United States	19,740		Ciryl Gane	vs.	Josh Hokit	Kayla Harrison	Stephen Thompson	$100,000	
797	UFC Fight Night: Cortes-Acosta vs. Walker	Nov 7, 2026	Meta Apex	Las Vegas, Nevada	United States	—N/a		Johnny Walker	vs.	Waldo Cortes-Acosta	Elijah Smith	Thomas Petersen	$100,000	
796	UFC Fight Night: Moicano vs. Nolan	Oct 31, 2026	Meta Apex	Las Vegas, Nevada	United States	—N/a		—N/a			Tom Nolan	Julian Erosa	$100,000	
796	UFC Fight Night: Moicano vs. Nolan	Oct 31, 2026	Meta Apex	Las Vegas, Nevada	United States	—N/a		—N/a			Joseph Kropschot	Lucia Szabová	$100,000	
795	UFC 333: Volkanovski vs. Evloev	Oct 24, 2026	Etihad Arena	Abu Dhabi	United Arab Emirates	—N/a		Petr Yan	vs.	Merab Dvalishvili	Alexander Volkanovski	Lone'er Kavanagh	$100,000	
794	UFC Fight Night: Buckley vs. Malott	Oct 17, 2026	Rogers Place	Edmonton, Alberta	Canada	16,903		—N/a			Mike Malott	Marc-André Barriault	$100,000	
794	UFC Fight Night: Buckley vs. Malott	Oct 17, 2026	Rogers Place	Edmonton, Alberta	Canada	16,903		—N/a			Mandel Nallo	Joel Faglier	$100,000	
793	UFC Fight Night: Allen vs. Duncan	Oct 10, 2026	Meta Apex	Las Vegas, Nevada	United States	—N/a		—N/a			Brendan Allen	Andre Fili	$100,000	
793	UFC Fight Night: Allen vs. Duncan	Oct 10, 2026	Meta Apex	Las Vegas, Nevada	United States	—N/a		—N/a			Otari Tanzilovi	Alice Pereira	$100,000	
792	UFC 332: Silva vs. Wang	Oct 3, 2026	Delta Center	Salt Lake City, Utah	United States	16,492		—N/a			Roman Kopylov	Imanol Rodríguez	$100,000	
792	UFC 332: Silva vs. Wang	Oct 3, 2026	Delta Center	Salt Lake City, Utah	United States	16,492		—N/a			Damian Pinas	Johnny Walker	$100,000	
791	UFC Fight Night: Rosas Jr. vs. Barcelos	Sep 26, 2026	Meta Apex	Las Vegas, Nevada	United States	—N/a		Raul Rosas Jr.	vs.	Raoni Barcelos	Yazmin Jauregui	Luis Hernandez	$100,000	
790	UFC 331: Van vs. Pantoja 2	Sep 19, 2026	Crypto.com Arena	Los Angeles, California	United States	19,357		Joshua Van	vs.	Alexandre Pantoja	Arman Tsarukyan	Casey O'Neill	$100,000^{1}	
790	UFC 331: Van vs. Pantoja 2	Sep 19, 2026	Crypto.com Arena	Los Angeles, California	United States	19,357		Joshua Van	vs.	Alexandre Pantoja	Sean Sharaf (Proper Chaos)	—N/a	$100,000^{1}	
789	UFC Fight Night: Silva vs. Delgado	Sep 12, 2026	Desert Diamond Arena	Glendale, Arizona	United States	16,928		Tommy McMillen	vs.	Marwan Rahiki	Jean Silva	Sean King III	$100,000	
788	UFC Fight Night: Hooker vs. Parnasse	Sep 5, 2026	Accor Arena	Paris	France	15,687		—N/a			Salahdine Parnasse	Axel Sola	$100,000	
788	UFC Fight Night: Hooker vs. Parnasse	Sep 5, 2026	Accor Arena	Paris	France	15,687		—N/a			Losene Keita	Mário Pinto	$100,000	
787	UFC Fight Night: Nurmagomedov vs. Song	Aug 29, 2026	Shanghai Oriental Sports Center	Shanghai	China	16,188		Liu Ce	vs.	Levi Rodrigues Jr.	Song Yadong	Bilal Hasan	$100,000	
786	UFC Fight Night: Hernandez vs. Rodrigues	Aug 22, 2026	Golden 1 Center	Sacramento, California	United States	16,867		Gregory Rodrigues	vs.	Anthony Hernandez	MarQuel Mederos	Carli Judice	$100,000	
785	UFC 330: Makhachev vs. Machado Garry	Aug 15, 2026	Xfinity Mobile Arena	Philadelphia, Pennsylvania	United States	19,236		—N/a			Jalin Turner	Dustin Stoltzfus	$100,000	
785	UFC 330: Makhachev vs. Machado Garry	Aug 15, 2026	Xfinity Mobile Arena	Philadelphia, Pennsylvania	United States	19,236		—N/a			Charles Johnson	Jeremiah Wells	$100,000	
784	UFC Fight Night: Gamrot vs. Salkilld	Aug 8, 2026	Meta Apex	Las Vegas, Nevada	United States	—N/a		Carlos Diego Ferreira	vs.	Billy Quarantillo	Quillan Salkilld	Ty Miller	$100,000	
783	UFC Fight Night: Medić vs. Rodriguez	Aug 1, 2026	Belgrade Arena	Belgrade	Serbia	18,623		—N/a			Uroš Medić	Navajo Stirling	$100,000	
783	UFC Fight Night: Medić vs. Rodriguez	Aug 1, 2026	Belgrade Arena	Belgrade	Serbia	18,623		—N/a			Gilbert Urbina	Nina Nikolija Milošević	$100,000	
782	UFC Fight Night: Ankalaev vs. Guskov	Jul 25, 2026	Etihad Arena	Abu Dhabi	United Arab Emirates	—N/a		Rizvan Kuniev	vs.	Tyrell Fortune	Ramazan Temirov	Valter Walker	$100,000	
781	UFC Fight Night: du Plessis vs. Usman	Jul 18, 2026	Paycom Center	Oklahoma City, Oklahoma	United States	17,173		Dricus du Plessis	vs.	Kamaru Usman	Tommy McMillen	Felipe Franco	$100,000	
780	UFC 329: McGregor vs. Holloway 2	Jul 11, 2026	T-Mobile Arena	Las Vegas, Nevada	United States	20,078		Brandon Royval	vs.	Lone'er Kavanagh	Paddy Pimblett	King Green	$100,000	
779	UFC Fight Night: Fiziev vs. Torres	Jun 27, 2026	Baku Crystal Hall	Baku	Azerbaijan	—N/a		—N/a			Rafael Fiziev	Asu Almabayev	$100,000	
779	UFC Fight Night: Fiziev vs. Torres	Jun 27, 2026	Baku Crystal Hall	Baku	Azerbaijan	—N/a		—N/a			Abdul-Rakhman Yakhyaev	Daniil Donchenko	$100,000	
778	UFC Fight Night: Kape vs. Horiguchi	Jun 20, 2026	Meta Apex	Las Vegas, Nevada	United States	—N/a		Vinicius Oliveira	vs.	Andre Fili	Manel Kape	Murtazali Magomedov	$100,000	
777	UFC Freedom 250	Jun 14, 2026	White House	Washington, D.C.	United States	—N/a		Justin Gaethje	vs.	Ilia Topuria	Justin Gaethje	Ciryl Gane	$400,000 (FOTN) $425,000 (POTN)	
776	UFC Fight Night: Muhammad vs. Bonfim	Jun 6, 2026	Meta Apex	Las Vegas, Nevada	United States	—N/a		Brendan Allen	vs.	Edmen Shahbazyan	Iwo Baraniewski	Édgar Cháirez	$100,000	
775	UFC Fight Night: Song vs. Figueiredo	May 30, 2026	Galaxy Arena	Macau, SAR	China	12,647		Alonzo Menifield	vs.	Zhang Mingyang	Song Yadong	Kai Asakura	$100,000	
774	UFC Fight Night: Allen vs. Costa	May 16, 2026	Meta Apex	Las Vegas, Nevada	United States	—N/a		Choi Doo-ho	vs.	Daniel Santos	Juan Díaz	Alice Ardelean	$100,000	
773	UFC 328: Chimaev vs. Strickland	May 9, 2026	Prudential Center	Newark, New Jersey	United States	17,783		Joshua Van	vs.	Tatsuro Taira	Yaroslav Amosov	Jim Miller	$100,000	
772	UFC Fight Night: Della Maddalena vs. Prates	May 2, 2026	RAC Arena	Perth	Australia	13,839		Shamil Gaziev	vs.	Brando Peričić	Carlos Prates	Quillan Salkilld	$100,000	
771	UFC Fight Night: Sterling vs. Zalal	Apr 25, 2026	Meta Apex	Las Vegas, Nevada	United States	—N/a		Davey Grant	vs.	Adrián Luna Martinetti	Ryan Spann	Jackson McVey	$100,000	
770	UFC Fight Night: Burns vs. Malott	Apr 18, 2026	Canada Life Centre	Winnipeg, Manitoba	Canada	14,051		Charles Jourdain	vs.	Kyler Phillips	Mike Malott	Márcio Barbosa	$100,000	
769	UFC 327: Procházka vs. Ulberg	Apr 11, 2026	Kaseya Center	Miami, Florida	United States	17,741		Josh Hokit	vs.	Curtis Blaydes	Carlos Ulberg	Josh Hokit	$100,000	
768	UFC Fight Night: Moicano vs. Duncan	Apr 4, 2026	Meta Apex	Las Vegas, Nevada	United States	—N/a		Tommy McMillen	vs.	Manolo Zecchini	Alessandro Costa	Alice Pereira	$100,000	
767	UFC Fight Night: Adesanya vs. Pyfer	Mar 28, 2026	Climate Pledge Arena	Seattle, Washington	United States	17,854		Ignacio Bahamondes	vs.	Tofiq Musayev	Joe Pyfer	Alexa Grasso	$100,000	
766	UFC Fight Night: Evloev vs. Murphy	Mar 21, 2026	The O_{2} Arena	London, England	United Kingdom	18,629		Mason Jones	vs.	Axel Sola	Iwo Baraniewski	Shanelle Dyer	$100,000	
765	UFC Fight Night: Emmett vs. Vallejos	Mar 14, 2026	Meta Apex	Las Vegas, Nevada	United States	—N/a		Marwan Rahiki	vs.	Harry Hardwick	Kevin Vallejos	Manoel Sousa	$100,000	
764	UFC 326: Holloway vs Oliveira 2	Mar 7, 2026	T-Mobile Arena	Las Vegas, Nevada	United States	19,480		—N/a			Drew Dober	Gregory Rodrigues	$100,000	
764	UFC 326: Holloway vs Oliveira 2	Mar 7, 2026	T-Mobile Arena	Las Vegas, Nevada	United States	19,480		—N/a			Alberto Montes	Rodolfo Bellato	$100,000	
763	UFC Fight Night: Moreno vs. Kavanagh	Feb 28, 2026	Arena CDMX	Mexico City	Mexico	16,454		Regina Tarin	vs.	Ernesta Kareckaitė	Lone'er Kavanagh	Imanol Rodríguez	$100,000	
762	UFC Fight Night: Strickland vs. Hernandez	Feb 21, 2026	Toyota Center	Houston, Texas	United States	17,160		—N/a			Sean Strickland	Uroš Medić	$100,000	
762	UFC Fight Night: Strickland vs. Hernandez	Feb 21, 2026	Toyota Center	Houston, Texas	United States	17,160		—N/a			Melquizael Costa	Jacobe Smith	$100,000	
761	UFC Fight Night: Bautista vs. Oliveira	Feb 7, 2026	Meta Apex	Las Vegas, Nevada	United States	—N/a		Michał Oleksiejczuk	vs.	Marc-André Barriault	Mario Bautista	Jakub Wikłacz	$100,000	
760	UFC 325: Volkanovski vs. Lopes 2	Feb 1, 2026	Qudos Bank Arena	Sydney	Australia	18,102		Alexander Volkanovski	vs.	Diego Lopes	Maurício Ruffy	Quillan Salkilld	$100,000	
759	UFC 324: Gaethje vs. Pimblett	Jan 24, 2026	T-Mobile Arena	Las Vegas, Nevada	United States	19,481		Justin Gaethje	vs.	Paddy Pimblett	Josh Hokit	Ty Miller	$100,000	

1. Sean Sharaf was awarded a one-time "Proper Chaos" bonus at UFC 331 selected by Dana White tied to the season two premiere of Paramount+ TV series MobLand.

== See also ==
- List of UFC champions
- List of UFC events
- List of current UFC fighters
- 2026 in Professional Fighters League
- 2026 in ONE Championship
- 2026 in Konfrontacja Sztuk Walki
- 2026 in Legacy Fighting Alliance
- 2026 in Absolute Championship Akhmat
- 2026 in Rizin Fighting Federation
- 2026 in LUX Fight League
- 2026 in Oktagon MMA
- 2026 in Cage Warriors
