= UFC Fight Night: Rosas Jr. vs. Barcelos =

Mixed martial arts event in 2026

- The poster for UFC Fight Night: Rosas Jr. vs. Barcelos
- Promotion: Ultimate Fighting Championship
- Date: September 26, 2026
- Venue: Meta Apex
- City: Enterprise, Nevada, United States
- Attendance: Not announced

Event chronology
UFC 331: Van vs. Pantoja 2	UFC Fight Night: Rosas Jr. vs. Barcelos	UFC 332: Silva vs. Wang

UFC Fight Night: Rosas Jr. vs. Barcelos (also known as UFC Fight Night 289 and UFC Vegas 121) was a mixed martial arts event produced by the Ultimate Fighting Championship that took place on September 26, 2026, at the Meta Apex in Enterprise, Nevada, part of the Las Vegas Valley, United States.

== Background ==
A bantamweight bout between Raoni Barcelos and Raul Rosas Jr. headlined the event. At 21 and 39 years old respectively, Rosas Jr. and Barcelos set the record for the largest age gap in UFC main event history at 17 years, surpassing the previous mark set at UFC Fight Night: Emmett vs. Vallejos in March 2026.

The bantamweight and women's strawweight finals of The Ultimate Fighter: Team Cormier vs. Team Bisping took place at this event.

Road to UFC Season 1 bantamweight winner Rinya Nakamura faced Brady Hiestand in a bantamweight bout. They were originally scheduled to compete at UFC 298 in February 2024, but Hiestand pulled out due to injury.

A middleweight bout between Mickey Gall and Sedriques Dumas was scheduled for the event. However, Gall was removed from the bout two days before the event due to medical issues and was replaced by promotional newcomer Luis Hernandez, in what became a light heavyweight bout.

== Results ==
Main card (Paramount+)
Weight class				Method	Round	Time	Notes
Bantamweight	Raul Rosas Jr.	def.	Raoni Barcelos	KO (slam)	5	1:38
Women's Bantamweight	Ailín Pérez	def.	Norma Dumont	Decision (unanimous) (29–28, 29–28, 29–28)	3	5:00
Light Heavyweight	Luis Hernandez	def.	Sedriques Dumas	Submission (guillotine choke)	1	0:57
Bantamweight	Ilimbek Akylbek uulu	def.	Mehemmedeli Osmanli	DQ (illegal knee)	1	2:19	(Note: The Ultimate Fighter 34 bantamweight tournament final. An illegal knee to a downed opponent rendered Akylbek unable to continue.)
Women's Strawweight	Valesca Machado	def.	Melissa Amaya	TKO (punches)	2	3:19	(Note: The Ultimate Fighter 34 women's strawweight tournament final.)
Preliminary card (Paramount+)
Bantamweight	Brady Hiestand	def.	Rinya Nakamura	Submission (rear-naked choke)	2	4:07
Middleweight	Rodolfo Vieira	def.	Robert Bryczek	Decision (unanimous) (30–27, 30–27, 30–27)	3	5:00
Light Heavyweight	Christian Edwards	def.	Rodolfo Bellato	TKO (punches)	3	1:47
Lightweight	Elves Brener	def.	Josiah Harrell	TKO (punches)	1	4:14
Bantamweight	Montel Jackson	def.	Ricky Simón	KO (punches)	2	2:39
Bantamweight	Alateng Heili	def.	John Castañeda	Decision (split) (29–28, 28–29, 29–28)	3	5:00
Women's Strawweight	Yazmin Jauregui	def.	Vanessa Demopoulos	KO (punches)	1	1:02

== Bonus awards ==
The following fighters received $100,000 bonuses. The other finishes received $25,000 additional bonuses.

- Fight of the Night: Raul Rosas Jr. vs. Raoni Barcelos
- Performance of the Night: Luis Hernandez and Yazmin Jauregui

== See also ==
- 2026 in UFC
- List of current UFC fighters
- List of UFC events
