= Peter Queally =

Peter Queally may refer to:

- Peter Queally (fighter) (born 1985)
- Peter Queally (hurler)
