= Valesca =

Valesca is a given female name. Notable people with the name include:

- Valesca Machado (born 1996), Brazilian mixed martial artist
- Valesca Popozuda (born 1978), Brazilian singer, dancer and reality show contestant
