= Bellator 275 =

MMA event

Bellator 275: Mousasi vs. Vanderford
- The poster for Bellator 275: Mousasi vs. Vanderford
- Promotion: Bellator MMA
- Date: February 25, 2022
- Venue: 3Arena
- City: Dublin, Ireland

Event chronology
| Bellator 274: Gracie vs. Storley | Bellator 275: Mousasi vs. Vanderford | Bellator 276: Borics vs. Burnell |

Bellator 275: Mousasi vs. Vanderford was a mixed martial arts event produced by Bellator MMA that took place on February 25, 2022, at the 3Arena in Dublin, Ireland.

== Background ==
The event marked the promotion's seventh visit to Dublin and first since Bellator 270 in November 2021.

A Bellator Middleweight World Championship bout between current two-time champion (also former Strikeforce Light Heavyweight Champion) Gegard Mousasi and undefeated contender Austin Vanderford headlined the event.

A middleweight bout between Fabian Edwards and Marian Dimitrov was scheduled for this event. However, the bout was scrapped a week before for unknown reason. Edwards was rebooked against former UFC Light Heavyweight Champion Lyoto Machida at Bellator London.

A lightweight bout between Peter Queally and Kane Mousah and welterweight bout between Stefano Paternò and Luca Poclit were expected to take place at the event. However, Queally and Paternò both pulled out off their bouts due to injury.

At the weigh-ins, Jamie Hay missed weight for his bout, weighing in at 146.8 pounds, .8 pounds over the featherweight non-title fight limit. The bout proceeded at catchweight and Hay was fined a percentage of his purse, which went to his opponent Lee Hammond.

== Results ==
Main Card (Showtime)
| Weight class | | | | Method | Round | Time | Notes |
|---|---|---|---|---|---|---|---|
| Middleweight | Gegard Mousasi (c) | def. | Austin Vanderford | TKO (punches) | 1 | 1:25 | (Note: For the Bellator Middleweight World Championship.) |
| Women's Featherweight | Sinead Kavanagh | def. | Leah McCourt | Decision (unanimous) (29–28, 29–28, 30–27) | 3 | 5:00 |
| Featherweight | Ciaran Clarke | def. | Abou Tounkara | TKO (shoulder injury) | 1 | 5:00 |
| Featherweight | Khasan Magomedsharipov | def. | José Sanchez | Decision (unanimous) (30–26, 30–27, 30–27) | 3 | 5:00 |
| Bantamweight | Jornel Lugo | def. | Brian Moore | Decision (unanimous) (30–27, 29–28, 29–28) | 3 | 5:00 |
Preliminary card (Youtube/Pluto TV)
| Bantamweight | Brett Johns | def. | Khurshed Kakhorov | TKO (punches) | 3 | 3:00 |
| Lightweight | Davy Gallon | def. | Charlie Leary | TKO (punches) | 2 | 3:01 |
| Women's Strawweight | Stéphanie Page | def. | Danni McCormack | TKO (punches) | 1 | 1:46 |
| Lightweight | Darragh Kelly | def. | Junior Morgan | Submission (guillotine choke) | 1 | 1:47 |
| Lightweight | Vladimir Tokov | def. | Daniele Scatizzi | Decision (unanimous) (29–28, 29–28, 29–28) | 3 | 5:00 |
| Heavyweight | Gokhan Saricam | def. | Kirill Sidelnikov | Decision (unanimous) (30–27, 30–27, 30–27) | 3 | 5:00 |
| Featherweight | Nathan Kelly | def. | Scott Pedersen | Decision (unanimous) (30–27, 29–28, 29–28) | 3 | 5:00 |
| Catchweight (146.8 lb) | Lee Hammond | def. | Jamie Hay | TKO (knee and punches) | 1 | 3:32 | (Note: Originally a featherweight bout; Hay missed weight) |

== See also ==
- 2022 in Bellator MMA
- List of Bellator MMA events
- List of current Bellator fighters
