= Anita Karim =

Pakistani mixed martial arts (MMA) fighter

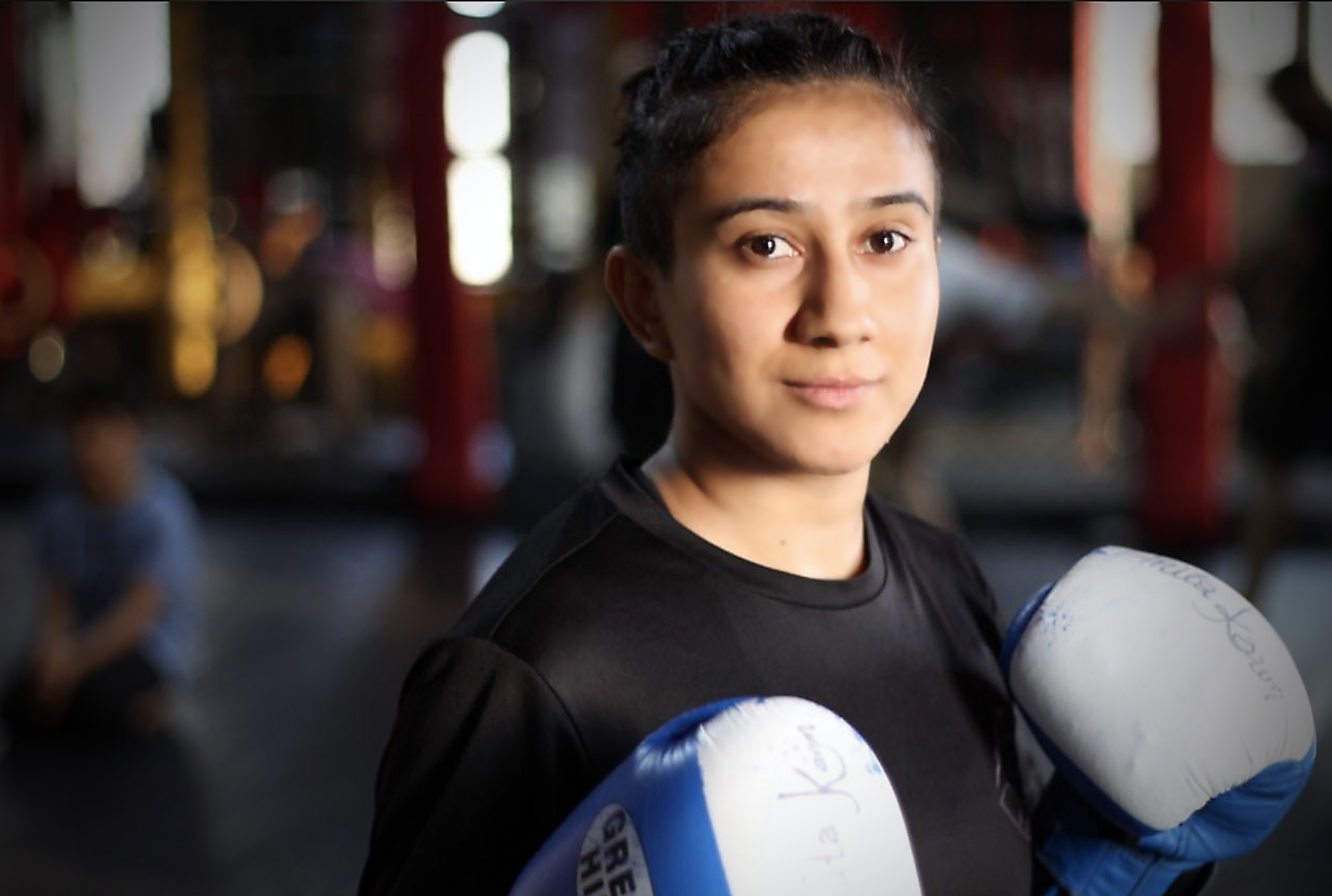
- Born: Anita Karim; October 2, 1996 (age 30); Hunza Valley, Pakistan
- Native name: انیتا کریم
- Other names: The Arm Collector
- Nationality: Pakistani
- Height: 5 ft 0 in (152 cm)
- Weight: 115 lb (52 kg; 8 st 3 lb)
- Division: Atomweight
- Fighting out of: Islamabad, Pakistan
- Team: Team Fight Fortress (TFF), Fairtex Gym
- Years active: 2017–present

Mixed martial arts record
- Total: 8
- Wins: 6
- By knockout: 1
- By submission: 2
- By decision: 3
- Losses: 2
- By submission: 1
- By decision: 1
- Draws: 0

Other information
- Notable relatives: Uloomi Karim (brother)
- Mixed martial arts record from Sherdog

Anita Karim (Urdu: انیتا کریم) is a Pakistani mixed martial artist. She is the first international female Mixed Martial Arts (MMA) fighter from Pakistan to win multiple national and international-level bouts.

== Early years ==
Karim was born in Karimabad, Hunza Valley, Gilgit-Baltistan, Pakistan, in a family of MMA fighters. Karim, along with her brothers, Uloomi Karim _{[ur]}, Ehtisham Karim, and Ali Sultan, founded the MMA gym, "Fight Fortress", which is one of the first MMA training centers in Pakistan.

== Achievements ==
Karim emerged victorious with 7 gold medals and 1 silver medal at the Pakistan Grappling Challenge (PGC) 2017–2018.

On 28 February 2019, Karim won her One Warrior Series 4 (OWS) bout against Indonesia's Gita Suharsono. For this victory, she was awarded Rs. 100,000 by the Chief Minister of Gilgit-Baltistan, Hafiz Hafeezur Rehman. Karim also was given a shield as appreciation for her representation of Pakistan by the Governor of Gilgit-Baltistan, Raja Jalal Hussain Maqpoon.

On 19 February 2020, Karim unanimously won her match against Estonia's Marie Ruumet in One Warrior Series 10.

== Mixed martial arts record ==
Professional record breakdown
8 matches	6 wins	2 losses
By knockout	1	0
By submission	2	1
By decision	3	1

Res.	Record	Opponent	Method	Event	Date	Round	Time	Location	Notes
Win	6–2	Pariza Zarei	TKO (punches)	Infinite Championship 3	January 10, 2026	1	2:30	Islamabad, Pakistan	Won the inaugural IC Strawweight Championship.
Win	5–2	Adriana Fusini	Submission (keylock)	ONE Friday Fights 49	January 26, 2024	1	2:20	Bangkok, Thailand	
Win	4–2	Luknam Bunson	Submission (rear-naked choke)	8 Suek Muay Thai YuenTien x Legend Fighting Championship	September 2, 2023	2	1:25	Samut Sakhon, Thailand	
Win	3–2	Uyen Ha	Decision (unanimous)	Fairtex Fight Promotion: Domination	June 11, 2022	3	5:00	Bangkok, Thailand	
Loss	2–2	Noelle Grandjean	Decision (unanimous)	Fairtex Fight Promotion: Descendents of the Empire 2	March 11, 2022	3	5:00	Bangkok, Thailand	
Win	2–1	Marie Ruumet	Decision (unanimous)	ONE Warrior Series 10	February 19, 2020	3	5:00	Kallang, Singapore	
Win	1–1	Gita Suharsono	Decision (unanimous)	ONE Warrior Series 4	February 28, 2019	3	5:00	Kallang, Singapore	
Loss	0–1	Nyrene Crowley	Submission (rear-naked choke)	ONE Warrior Series 2	July 19, 2018	2	1:54	Jurong East, Singapore	Strawweight debut.

== Mixed martial arts exhibition record ==
Exhibition record breakdown		
1 match	0 wins	1 loss
By knockout	0	1

Res.	Record	Opponent	Method	Event	Date	Round	Time	Location	Notes
Loss	0–1	Giovanna Canuto	TKO	The Ultimate Fighter: Team Cormier vs. Team Bisping	April 21, 2026	1	0:28	Las Vegas, Nevada, United States	The Ultimate Fighter 34 Quarterfinal round.

== See also ==
- List of female mixed martial artists
