= UFC Fight Night: Strickland vs. Hernandez =

2026 mixed martial arts event in Houston, Texas

- The poster for UFC Fight Night: Strickland vs. Hernandez
- Promotion: Ultimate Fighting Championship
- Date: February 21, 2026
- Venue: Toyota Center
- City: Houston, Texas, United States
- Attendance: 17,160
- Total gate: $3,300,000

Event chronology
UFC Fight Night: Bautista vs. Oliveira	UFC Fight Night: Strickland vs. Hernandez	UFC Fight Night: Moreno vs. Kavanagh

UFC Fight Night: Strickland vs. Hernandez (also known as UFC Fight Night 267) was a mixed martial arts event produced by the Ultimate Fighting Championship that took place on February 21, 2026 at the Toyota Center in Houston, Texas, United States.

== Background ==
The event marked the promotion's tenth visit to Houston and first since UFC 271 in February 2022.

A middleweight bout between former UFC Middleweight Champion Sean Strickland and former LFA Middleweight Champion Anthony Hernandez headlined the event.

A women's flyweight bout between The Ultimate Fighter: Team Peña vs. Team Nunes flyweight winner Juliana Miller and Carli Judice took place at the event. They were scheduled to meet at UFC Fight Night: Cannonier vs. Rodrigues in February 2025, but Miller withdrew from the fight due to an injury.

A heavyweight bout between Serghei Spivac and 2022 PFL Heavyweight Tournament winner Ante Delija was initially scheduled for UFC 325, but was later rescheduled to this event.

A welterweight bout between Austin Vanderford and promotional newcomer Jean-Paul Lebosnoyani was scheduled for this event. However, Vanderford withdrew for undisclosed reasons and was replaced by Philip Rowe.

A welterweight bout between Geoff Neal and Kevin Holland was reportedly scheduled for this event. The pairing would have marked a rematch of their first meeting in January 2017 at an independent promotion, where Neal lost by technical knockout in the third round. However, for undisclosed reasons, Holland was replaced by Uroš Medić.

A welterweight bout between undefeated prospect Jacobe Smith and Ko Seok-hyeon was scheduled for this event. However, Ko withdrew due to an injury and was replaced by undefeated promotional newcomer Josiah Harrell.

== Results ==
Main card (Paramount+)
Weight class				Method	Round	Time	Notes
Middleweight	Sean Strickland	def.	Anthony Hernandez	TKO (punches)	3	2:23
Welterweight	Uroš Medić	def.	Geoff Neal	KO (punches)	1	1:19
Featherweight	Melquizael Costa	def.	Dan Ige	TKO (spinning back kick and punches)	1	4:56
Heavyweight	Serghei Spivac	def.	Ante Delija	Decision (unanimous) (30–27, 29–28, 29–28)	3	5:00
Welterweight	Jacobe Smith	def.	Josiah Harrell	KO (punches)	1	3:01
Middleweight	Michel Pereira	def.	Zachary Reese	Decision (split) (29–28, 28–29, 29–28)	3	5:00
Preliminary card (Paramount+ / UFC Fight Pass)
Welterweight	Carlos Leal	def.	Chidi Njokuani	Decision (unanimous) (30–27, 29–28, 29–28)	3	5:00
Flyweight	Alibi Idiris	vs.	Ode' Osbourne	NC (overturned)	3	5:00	(Note: Originally a unanimous decision (29–28, 30–27, 30–27) win for Idiris; overturned after he tested positive for hydrochlorothiazide.)
Flyweight	Alden Coria	def.	Luis Gurule	Decision (unanimous) (30–27, 30–27, 30–27)	3	5:00
Women's Bantamweight	Joselyne Edwards	def.	Nora Cornolle	Submission (rear-naked choke)	2	2:44
Welterweight	Punahele Soriano	def.	Ramiz Brahimaj	Decision (unanimous) (29–28, 29–28, 29–28)	3	5:00
Welterweight	Jean-Paul Lebosnoyani	def.	Philip Rowe	Decision (split) (29–28, 28–29, 29–28)	3	5:00
Featherweight	Jordan Leavitt	def.	Yadier del Valle	Decision (unanimous) (29–28, 29–28, 29–28)	3	5:00
Women's Flyweight	Carli Judice	def.	Juliana Miller	Decision (unanimous) (29–28, 29–28, 30–27)	3	5:00

== Bonus awards ==
The following fighters received $100,000 bonuses. $25,000 was given to Joselyne Edwards for the additional finish bonus.

- Fight of the Night: No bonus awarded.
- Performance of the Night: Sean Strickland, Uroš Medić, Melquizael Costa, and Jacobe Smith

== Aftermath ==
On March 31, it was announced that Alibi Idiris has accepted a 12-month suspension after failing an in-competition test submitted to Combat Sports Anti-Doping (CSAD) on fight day. Idiris tested positive for hydrochlorothiazide, a prohibited diuretic in the Diuretics and Masking Agents class of substances on the UFC Prohibited List. Furthermore, Idiris' victory against Ode' Osbourne was overturned. That decision came separately from the Texas Department of Licensing and Regulation (TDLR), which also lists hydrochlorothiazide as a banned substance.

== See also ==
- List of UFC events
- List of current UFC fighters
- 2026 in UFC
