= Austin Vanderford =

American mixed martial arts fighter

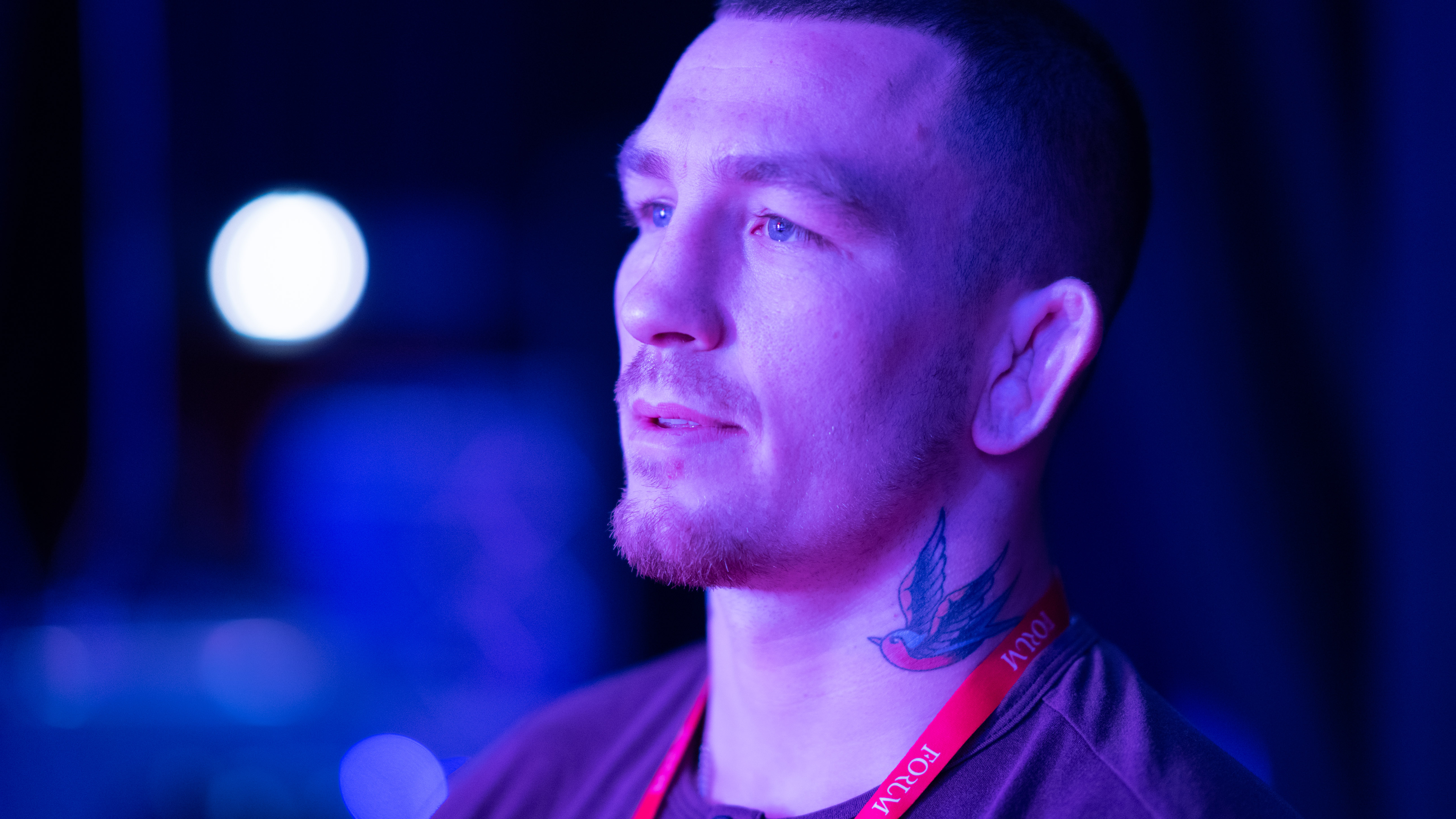
- Vanderford at the 2018 Web Summit
- Born: March 21, 1990 (age 36); Santa Rosa, California, U.S.
- Nickname: The Gentleman
- Height: 5 ft 11 in (1.80 m)
- Weight: 185 lb (84 kg; 13 st 3 lb)
- Division: Middleweight; Welterweight
- Reach: 74 in (188 cm)
- Style: Wrestling
- Fighting out of: Portland, Oregon, U.S.
- Team: Gracie Barra Portland
- Years active: 2017–present

Mixed martial arts record
- Total: 16
- Wins: 13
- By knockout: 5
- By submission: 3
- By decision: 5
- Losses: 3
- By knockout: 2
- By submission: 1

Amateur record
- Total: 4
- Wins: 4
- By knockout: 1
- By submission: 2
- By decision: 1

Other information
- Spouse: Paige VanZant (m. 2018)
- Mixed martial arts record from Sherdog
Medal record
Men's collegiate wrestling
Representing Southern Oregon University
NAIA Championships
Gold medal – first place	2012 Des Moines	184 lb

Austin Vanderford (born March 21, 1990) is an American professional mixed martial artist, who competes in the Middleweight division of the Ultimate Fighting Championship (UFC). He previously fought in Bellator MMA, where he contended for the Bellator Middleweight World Championship.

== Background ==
Vanderford was born in Santa Rosa, California, before moving at the age of 9 months old to Ninilchik, Alaska. He would develop a taste for competitive sport while wrestling for his high school team, where he became a 2-time Alaska State Wrestling Champion (2007-160 lbs, 2006-152 lbs) in his junior and senior years.

Vanderford wrestled at Southern Oregon University, becoming the NAIA National Wrestling Champion in 2012 (184 lbs.) and was a 2-time NAIA All-American wrestler. After finishing his college career graduating with a bachelor's degree, he took up a coaching job with the university for a couple of years, before following his desire to fight competitively. Vanderford would win all four bouts of his amateur career as a welterweight.

== Mixed martial arts career ==
=== Early career ===
Making his professional debut at Prime Fighting 9 on March 11, 2017, Vanderford faced Sol Renato, going on to defeat him via TKO in first round. He went on to defeat his next two opponents, Adam Fugitt and Ben Fodor, both via unanimous decisions, winning the CageSport Welterweight title against the later at CageSport 47. He would go on to tap out Kenny Licea in the second round via rear-naked choke at VFC 59, before he was invited to face Angelo Trevino on July 17, 2018, at Dana White's Contender Series 13. He won the fight via a rear-naked choke in round two, however did not secure a contract with the UFC. In his last bout on the regionals, Vanderford faced Brazil's Edmilson Freitas, knocking him out in the first round.

=== Bellator MMA ===
After going undefeated in 6 bouts on the regional scene, Vanderford signed a multi-fight contract with Bellator MMA.

In his debut appearance with Bellator MMA at Bellator 215 on February 15, 2019, he took on Cody Jones and submitted him via arm-triangle choke in the first round.

Vanderford faced Joseph Creer at Bellator 225 on August 25, 2019, winning the bout after the doctor stopped the fight after the second round.

On November 15, 2019, at Bellator 234, he faced Russian submission specialist Grachik Bozinyan, defeating him via unanimous decision.

Vanderford was scheduled to face Daniel Madrid on September 12, 2020, at Bellator 246. However, he had to pull out of the bout for unknown reasons.

Vanderford was scheduled to face Chris Curtis on November 5, 2020, at Bellator 251. However, Curtis had to pull out of the bout due to a positive COVID test and was replaced by Vinicius de Jesus. Vanderford won the bout via unanimous decision.

Vanderford faced Fabian Edwards on May 21, 2021, at Bellator 259, defeating him via unanimous decision.

Vanderford fought for the Bellator Middleweight World Championship against Gegard Mousasi at Bellator 275 on February 25, 2022, at the 3Arena in Dublin, Ireland. He lost the fight via technical knockout in round one.

Vanderford was scheduled to face Anthony Adams at Bellator 284 on August 12, 2022. After Adams pulled out of the bout 2 weeks before the event, Aaron Jeffery stepped in on short notice. He lost the bout in the first round via TKO stoppage.

Vanderford was scheduled to face Imamshafi Aliev on June 16, 2023 at Bellator 297. However, at the beginning of June, the bout was scrapped for unknown reasons.

On February 14, 2024, Vanderford revealed that he negotiated his release from Bellator MMA.

=== Ultimate Fighting Championship ===
On February 18, 2025, it was reported that Vanderford had signed with the Ultimate Fighting Championship. He faced Nikolay Veretennikov on February 22, 2025 at UFC Fight Night 252 in a 175-pound catchweight bout. He won the fight by technical knockout in the second round.

Vanderford was scheduled to face Ramiz Brahimaj on October 4, 2025 at UFC 320. He lost the fight via a guillotine choke submission in the second round.

Vanderford was scheduled to face Jean-Paul Lebosnoyani on February 21, 2026, at UFC Fight Night 267. However, Vanderford withdrew for undisclosed reasons and was replaced by Philip Rowe.

== Personal life ==
In September 2018, Vanderford married Paige VanZant, a former UFC strawweight. The couple began dating the previous year, and Vanderford proposed to VanZant in January 2018.

== Championships and accomplishments ==
- CageSport
  - CS Welterweight Championship (One time; former)

== Mixed martial arts record ==
Professional record breakdown
16 matches	13 wins	3 losses
By knockout	5	2
By submission	3	1
By decision	5	0

Res.	Record	Opponent	Method	Event	Date	Round	Time	Location	Notes
Loss	13–3	Ramiz Brahimaj	Submission (guillotine choke)	UFC 320	October 4, 2025	2	2:24	Las Vegas, Nevada, United States	
Win	13–2	Nikolay Veretennikov	TKO (punches)	UFC Fight Night: Cejudo vs. Song	February 22, 2025	2	4:13	Seattle, Washington, United States	Catchweight (175 lb) bout.
Win	12–2	Victor Romero	TKO (punch and elbows)	LFA 194	October 18, 2024	1	1:05	Niagara Falls, New York, United States	Return to Welterweight.
Loss	11–2	Aaron Jeffery	TKO (punches)	Bellator 284	August 12, 2022	1	1:25	Sioux Falls, South Dakota, United States	
Loss	11–1	Gegard Mousasi	TKO (punches)	Bellator 275	February 25, 2022	1	1:25	Dublin, Ireland	For the Bellator Middleweight World Championship.
Win	11–0	Fabian Edwards	Decision (unanimous)	Bellator 259	May 21, 2021	3	5:00	Uncasville, Connecticut, United States	
Win	10–0	Vinicius de Jesus	Decision (unanimous)	Bellator 251	November 5, 2020	3	5:00	Uncasville, Connecticut, United States	
Win	9–0	Grachik Bozinyan	Decision (unanimous)	Bellator 234	November 15, 2019	3	5:00	Tel Aviv, Israel	
Win	8–0	Joseph Creer	TKO (doctor stoppage)	Bellator 225	August 24, 2019	2	5:00	Bridgeport, Connecticut, United States	Middleweight debut.
Win	7–0	Cody Jones	Submission (arm-triangle choke)	Bellator 215	February 15, 2019	1	4:49	Uncasville, Connecticut, United States	Catchweight (175 lb) bout.
Win	6–0	Edmilson Freitas	KO (punch)	Final Fight Championship 32	October 19, 2018	1	1:38	Las Vegas, Nevada, United States	
Win	5–0	Angelo Trevino	Submission (rear-naked choke)	Dana White's Contender Series 13	July 17, 2018	2	2:42	Las Vegas, Nevada, United States	
Win	4–0	Kenny Licea	Submission (rear-naked choke)	Victory FC 59	December 16, 2017	2	4:03	Omaha, Nebraska, United States	
Win	3–0	Ben Fodor	Decision (unanimous)	CageSport 47	October 14, 2017	5	5:00	Tacoma, Washington, United States	Won the CS Welterweight Championship.
Win	2–0	Adam Fugitt	Decision (unanimous)	Arena Wars: Total Kombat	July 8, 2017	3	5:00	Medford, Oregon, United States	
Win	1–0	Sol Renato	TKO (punches)	Prime Fighting 9	March 11, 2017	1	2:33	Ridgefield, Washington, United States	Welterweight debut.

=== Amateur mixed martial arts record ===
Amateur record breakdown		
4 matches	4 wins	0 losses
By knockout	1	0
By submission	2	0
By decision	1	0

Res.	Record	Opponent	Method	Event	Date	Round	Time	Location	Notes
Win	4–0	Erik Herman	Decision (unanimous)	Arena Wars: Redemption	April 9, 2016	5	3:00	Grants Pass, Oregon, United States	Won the RPMMA Welterweight Championship.
Win	3–0	Daniel Pihl	Submission (triangle choke)	Rumble at the Roseland 85	January 23, 2016	2	1:15	Portland, Oregon, United States	Won the FCFF Middleweight Championship.
Win	2–0	Michael Collazo	TKO (punches)	Budo Fights 13	October 24, 2015	1	2:59	Bend, Oregon, United States	Middleweight debut.
Win	1–0	Eric McConico	Submission (arm-triangle choke)	Battle in the Burg 3	September 12, 2015	1	2:30	Roseburg, Oregon, United States	Light Heavyweight debut.

== Submission grappling record ==
? Matches, ? Wins (? Submissions), ? Losses (? Submissions), ? Draws
Result	Rec.	Opponent	Method	Event	Division	Date	Location
Loss	2–2–0	(United States) Gabriel Checco	Submission (rear-naked choke)	Submission Underground 14		May 31, 2020	Portland, Oregon, U.S.
win	2–1–0	(United States) Richie Martinez	Submission (arm triangle choke)	Submission Underground 13		April 26, 2020	Portland, Oregon, U.S.
win	1–1–0	(United States) Micah Brakefield	Submission (arm triangle choke)	Submission Underground 11		February 23, 2020	Portland, Oregon, U.S.
Loss	0–1–0	(United States) Jake Shields	Fastest Escape Time	Submission Underground 8		May 12, 2019	Portland, Oregon, U.S.

== See also ==
- List of male mixed martial artists
