= Gegard Mousasi =

Dutch kickboxer and mixed martial arts fighter (born 1985)

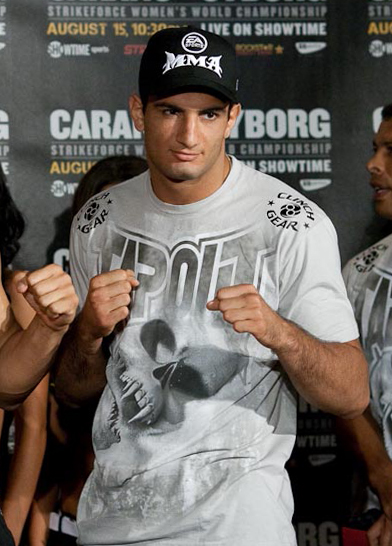
- Gegard Mousasi in 2009, at the weigh-in before the Strikeforce: Carano vs. Cyborg event.
- Born: August 1, 1985 (age 41); Tehran, Iran
- Other names: The Dreamcatcher
- Nationality: Dutch
- Height: 6 ft 2 in (1.88 m)
- Weight: 185 lb (84 kg; 13 st 3 lb)
- Division: Heavyweight/Openweight (2009); Light Heavyweight (2009–2013); Middleweight (2003–2008, 2014–present)
- Reach: 76 in (193 cm)
- Style: Kickboxing
- Fighting out of: Leiden, Netherlands
- Team: Sportschool Jurojin; Red Devil International; Kops Gym
- Teachers: Chris Dolman; Joop Kruis
- Trainer: Bert Kops Jr.
- Rank: Black belt in Judo
- Years active: 2003–present

Kickboxing record
- Total: 8
- Wins: 8
- By knockout: 3

Mixed martial arts record
- Total: 60
- Wins: 49
- By knockout: 28
- By submission: 12
- By decision: 9
- Losses: 9
- By knockout: 1
- By submission: 3
- By decision: 5
- Draws: 2

Amateur boxing record
- Total: 13
- Wins: 12
- By knockout: 9
- Losses: 1

Other information
- Mixed martial arts record from Sherdog

Gegard Mousasi (born 1 August 1985) is a Dutch mixed martial artist and former kickboxer. Mousasi most recently competed in Bellator MMA, where he is the former two-time Bellator Middleweight Champion. He is also the former DREAM Light Heavyweight Champion, former DREAM Middleweight Champion, former Cage Warriors World Middleweight Champion, and the former Strikeforce Light Heavyweight Champion, thus making Mousasi an overall six-time MMA world champion. At the moment of his departure from the UFC in July 2017, he was #4 in the official UFC middleweight rankings.

== Background ==
Mousasi was born in Tehran, Iran to ethnic Armenian parents during the Iran–Iraq War. His family name was changed in Iran long before his birth from Mofsesian to Mousasi. After spending a year in refugee camps, at the age of four, Mousasi and his family relocated to Leiden, Netherlands where he finished grade school before developing an interest in martial arts. Mousasi began training in judo at the age of eight and later boxing at age 15; a year later he became the amateur boxing champion of the Netherlands with a 12–1 record, earning nine knockouts. Mousasi then transitioned into kickboxing and then eventually to mixed martial arts.

== Mixed martial arts career ==
=== Pride FC Welterweight Grand Prix ===
In 2006 Mousasi signed with Pride FC to take part in Pride's Welterweight Grand Prix. In the opening round Mousasi faced Makoto Takimoto, at Pride Bushido 11, beating the Japanese fighter by TKO as the result of a broken eye socket in the first round. In the quarterfinals Mousasi went on to face Akihiro Gono, but was submitted in the second round by an armbar. After losing to Gono, Mousasi fought Héctor Lombard in the Grand Prix Alternate bout and took a unanimous decision victory over the Cuban-born fighter.

=== Dream Middleweight Grand Prix ===
In the first round of the Dream's 2008 Middleweight Grand Prix at Dream 2, Gegard defeated Brazilian jiu-jitsu black belt Denis Kang by triangle choke. Kang had defeated Gono in the semifinals of the Pride Welterweight Grand Prix. In the second round of the tournament, at Dream 4, Mousasi won a decision victory over Yoon Dong-sik and advanced to the final round, which took place at Dream 6. There he fought and submitted K-1 veteran Melvin Manhoef in the semifinals before meeting up with submission specialist Ronaldo Souza in the final. Mousasi defeated Souza by an upkick after being taken down by the Brazilian, thus becoming the first Dream Middleweight Champion and 2008 Middleweight Grand Prix tournament winner. Souza went on to win the Dream Middleweight Championship and later the Strikeforce Middleweight Championship.

=== ADCC Championships ===
On November 21, 2008, ADCC Europe president Marko Leistén confirmed the signing of Mousasi as one of ADCC's 2009 competitors. It was rumored he would fight in the -88 kg category. For unknown reasons, Mousasi never participated in the ADCC 2009 Championships.

=== M-1 Global ===
Gegard Mousasi next made an appearance at M-1 Global's Breakthrough event at August 28, 2009, where he sparred with former Pride Heavyweight and current WAMMA Heavyweight Champion Fedor Emelianenko, a friend and teammate, in an exhibition match. The two friends fought a competitive and friendly spirited exhibition with several Judo throws from both Emelianenko and Mousasi. Mousasi was defeated with a straight armbar.

In February 2010, Mousasi left M-1 Global Management. Mousasi was quoted as saying "After careful consideration, I have decided that it is in my best interest to part ways with M-1 Global," Mousasi wrote in the e-mail. "During the time I spent under their wing, M-1 Global, as a promoter and management company, allowed me to achieve many great things. I appreciate all they have done for me. My management is being taken care of by someone close to me."

=== Dream Super Hulk Grand Prix ===
In interviews from early 2009, Mousasi stated the weight he put on after winning Dream's middleweight tournament was too much for him to cut back down to middleweight and that his next fights would be at light heavyweight and eventually heavyweight instead.

Then he signed for a place at Dream's openweight Grand Prix, the Super Hulk Grand Prix, being scheduled to face Mark Hunt in the opening round. Mousasi submitted Hunt in the first round of the Super Hulk Grand Prix at Dream 9. Mousasi was then expected to face Rameau Thierry Sokoudjou at Dream 11, but he had to step down due to injury.

=== Affliction ===
Mousasi was set to fight Renato Sobral at Affliction: Trilogy on August 1, 2009, but the event was canceled after losing its main event 10 days prior to the event. It was originally planned for him to face Vitor Belfort at that event, but there was a disagreement between both fighters over which weight class the fight would be fought at.

=== Strikeforce and Dream ===
On Monday July 27, 2009 it was announced that the cancelled bout between Sobral and Mousasi would take place on the August 15 Strikeforce: Carano vs. Cyborg card and the fight became a contest for the Strikeforce Light Heavyweight Championship. Mousasi defeated Sobral via KO in the first minute of the first round to become the Strikeforce Light Heavyweight Champion.

Mousasi would go on to win his second Strikeforce bout by TKO (punches), three minutes and forty-three seconds into the 2nd round against Rameau Thierry Sokoudjou, who Mousasi was previously supposed to fight at Dream 11, on November 7, 2009, at Strikeforce: Fedor vs. Rogers. Mousasi was originally slated to defend his Strikeforce Light Heavyweight Championship, but eventually competed in a non-title bout.

Mousasi quickly defeated journeyman Gary Goodridge under MMA rules at Dynamite!! 2009.

On April 17, 2010, Mousasi lost the Strikeforce Light Heavyweight Championship belt in his first defense to Muhammed Lawal by way of unanimous decision. Lawal landed 11 of 14 takedowns, however Mousasi had outlanded Lawal in Total Punches 171 to 125. Mousasi was also given a point deduction following an illegal up-kick. Lawal would later test positive for anabolic steroids following a fight with Lorenz Larkin.

=== Dream Light Heavyweight Grand Prix ===
The 1st round took place at Dream 15, where Mousasi faced Jake O'Brien, who came in overweight to their bout. Dream officials made it a catchweight fight, but allowed the fight to be part of the tournament. Mousasi won the fight early in the first round by submission via standing guillotine choke. In the final, Mousasi faced Tatsuya Mizuno. Mousasi dominated the whole fight and finished the Japanese fighter in the first round via rear-naked choke.

=== Last of Strikeforce ===
Mousasi was expected to face Mike Kyle on April 9, 2011, at Strikeforce 33. However, Kyle was forced off the card with an injury and was replaced by Keith Jardine. The fight resulted in a majority draw due to an illegal upkick in the first round which resulted in a point deduction for Mousasi. Otherwise the bout would've been a unanimous decision victory for Mousasi. According to Fightmetric statistics, Mousasi outstruck Jardine 146 to 21. After the fight in an interview with Ariel Helwani of MMA Fighting.com, Strikeforce CEO Scott Coker stated "I've got a lot of respect for Keith Jardine, but I think Gegard won the fight." In the same interview, Coker also stated that a rematch between Mousasi and Jardine was definitely a possibility for the future. MMA Fighting.com named this fight their Runner-Up for "Robbery of the Half-Year."

Mousasi returned to Strikeforce to face Ovince Saint Preux on December 17, 2011, at Strikeforce: Melendez vs. Masvidal. He won the fight via unanimous decision, showing improved takedown defense and wrestling.

Mousasi was expected to face Mike Kyle at Strikeforce: Tate vs. Rousey, but Kyle once again withdrew due to injury.

Mousasi was later recovering from knee surgery following a torn ACL and was expected to fully recover by November, 2012. He also signed a new contract for six more fights with the organization, making a total of seven. However, with Strikeforce having shut down, this contract was likely now null and void.

Mousasi faced Mike Kyle at Strikeforce: Marquardt vs. Saffiedine on January 12, 2013. After avoiding most of Kyle's strikes in the early going, Mousasi took the fight to the ground and went on to finish the fight via rear-naked choke submission late in the first round. This was the fourth time a fight between Mousasi and Kyle was scheduled and the first time it wasn't canceled.

=== Ultimate Fighting Championship ===
On January 15, 2013, the UFC announced Mousasi would be joining 19 other Strikeforce fighters in a move to the UFC after his win over Mike Kyle at the promotion's last event, Strikeforce: Marquardt vs. Saffiedine.

Mousasi was expected to make his promotional debut against Alexander Gustafsson on April 6, 2013, at UFC on Fuel TV 9. However, on March 30, Gustafsson suffered a cut in training and, on April 2, was deemed unclear to participate by the Swedish MMA Federation. Gustafsson was replaced by Ilir Latifi, a UFC newcomer and training partner of Gustafsson. Mousasi won by unanimous decision, avoiding his opponent's takedown attempts and dominating the fight on the feet. He fought with an injured knee and underwent surgery after the fight. UFC President Dana White praised Mousasi for going through with the fight injured and in his opponents home, as well as accepting a late change of opponents.

==== Drop to middleweight ====
For his second fight with the promotion, Mousasi moved down to middleweight to face former light heavyweight champion Lyoto Machida on February 15, 2014, in the main event at UFC Fight Night 36. He lost the fight via unanimous decision. Despite the loss, the bout won Mousasi his first Fight of the Night bonus award.

Mousasi faced Mark Muñoz on May 31, 2014, in the main event at UFC Fight Night 41. He won the fight via submission in the first round and became the first fighter to submit Muñoz. The win also earned Mousasi his first Performance of the Night bonus award.

Mousasi was expected to rematch Ronaldo Souza on August 2, 2014, at UFC 176. However, after UFC 176, was cancelled, Mousasi/Souza was rescheduled and took place on September 5, 2014, at UFC Fight Night 50. Souza defeated Mousasi via submission in the third round.

Mousasi faced Dan Henderson on January 24, 2015, in the co-main event at UFC on Fox 14. He won the fight via TKO in the first round. The win also earned Mousasi his second Performance of the Night bonus award.

Mousasi faced Costas Philippou on May 16, 2015, at UFC Fight Night 66. He won the fight by unanimous decision.

Mousasi was expected to face Roan Carneiro on September 27, 2015, at UFC Fight Night 75. However, Carneiro pulled out due to injury and was subsequently replaced by Uriah Hall. After dominating the opening round, Mousasi was finished early in the second after absorbing a jumping spinning back kick, flying knee and follow-up punches.

Mousasi was briefly linked to a fight with Michael Bisping on February 27, 2016, at UFC Fight Night 84. However, on December 24, 2015, Bisping was pulled from the bout in favor of a matchup with Anderson Silva at the same event. Mousasi instead faced Thales Leites. He won the fight via unanimous decision.

Mousasi was expected to face Derek Brunson on July 9, 2016, at UFC 200. It was later revealed that Brunson was forced to pull out of the fight, and that Thiago Santos would replace him to fight Mousasi. He won the fight via TKO in the first round and was awarded a Performance of the Night bonus.

A long-discussed fight with former light heavyweight champion Vitor Belfort took place on October 8, 2016, at UFC 204. Mousasi won the fight via TKO in the second round.

Mousasi next faced Uriah Hall in a rematch on November 19, 2016, at UFC Fight Night 99. He won the fight via TKO in the first round.

Mousasi faced Chris Weidman at UFC 210 on April 8, 2017. In the second round, Mousasi hit Weidman with two knees to the head, the latter of which had referee Dan Miragliotta interrupt the fight because he mistakenly thought it was illegal. However, upon consultation with another referee "Big" John McCarthy, both knees appeared to be legal under the new unified rules introduced since 2017. Ultimately, the bout was ended and deemed a TKO win for Mousasi. Mousasi accused Weidman of trying to win the fight by disqualification. Weidman admitted he was expecting to win the fight by disqualification. He was only willing to continue when told the knee was legal after almost two minutes of the allotted five to recover by Miragliotta under the assumption the knee was illegal. Audio from Weidman's corner revealed Matt Serra saying Weidman told physicians he thought it was February. Being unable to tell medical staff the correct date possibly influenced their decision not to let him continue. The NYSAC released a statement that instant replay had been used legally to determine if the knee was legal, disproving the claim of UFC Vice President of Regulatory Affairs Marc Ratner who had told Joe Rogan otherwise on the live pay-per-view.

=== Bellator MMA ===
On 10 July 2017, Mousasi announced that he had signed with Bellator MMA for a six-fights deal and should compete for the middleweight title later in 2017. He also announced that his goal would be also to obtain the light heavyweight belt as well, after becoming the Bellator middleweight champion first.

During the Bellator 181 main card, it was announced by the promotion that Mousasi would make his debut against Alexander Shlemenko at Bellator 185 on 20 October 2017. In the opening minute a punch from Shlemenko broke Mousasi's right orbital, causing Mousasi to fight with one eye for almost the entire bout. The rest of the first round mainly consisted of Mousasi scoring multiple takedowns, landing many strikes, and attempting several neck cranks and rear naked chokes. A doctor inspected Mousasi's eye before the second round and deemed him fit to continue. In the second round, both fighters landed strikes in short exchanges for the first three minutes until Mousasi landed two takedowns and spent most of the last two minutes making submission attempts and landing strikes, which caused Shlemenko's face to bleed. When the round ended, Mousasi was still in a back mount dominant position over Shlemenko. In the third and final round, Schlemenko landed the better of strikes standing up and Mousasi's only takedown attempt was unsuccessful. Mousasi won the fight via unanimous decision. Seven out of eleven MMA media outlets scored the fight as a decision win for Shlemenko.

==== Bellator MMA Middleweight Champion ====
Mousasi faced Rafael Carvalho on 25 May 2018 at Bellator 200 in London, England for the Bellator Middleweight World Championship. After scoring a takedown early, Mousasi used ground and pound to win the fight via TKO in the first round. Mousasi became the first fighter to win a world title in both Strikeforce and Bellator MMA.

Mousasi made his first title defense against current Bellator Welterweight Champion Rory MacDonald on 29 September 2018 at Bellator 206. Mousasi stuffed MacDonald's takedown attempt and delivered ground and pound, eventually winning the fight via technical knockout in round two.

Mousasi was expected to make his second title defense against Rafael Lovato Jr. in the co-headliner of Bellator 214 on 26 January 2019. However, on 20 December 2018, it was reported that Mousasi pulled from the fight, citing a back injury. The fight eventually took place at Bellator 223 on 22 June 2019. Mousasi lost the bout and his title by majority decision.

After losing the title, Mousasi rematched prior UFC opponent Lyoto Machida at Bellator 228 on 28 September 2019. He was victorious by way of split decision.

==== Second title reign ====
In February 2020, it was announced that Rafael Lovato Jr. was forced to relinquish the Bellator Middleweight World Championship due to a cerebral cavernoma. Bellator then announced that Mousasi would face current Bellator Welterweight Champion Douglas Lima for the vacant Bellator Middleweight World Championship at Bellator 242 on 9 May 2020. At the time, Mousasi also signed a new, eight-fight contract with Bellator. However, it was announced that Bellator 242 and Mousasi's fight against Lima would be postponed due to the COVID-19 pandemic. Mousasi's bout against Lima was rescheduled to take place at Bellator 250. Mousasi won the fight via unanimous decision and claimed the title for a second time.

Mousasi made the first title defense of his second reign against John Salter on August 13, 2021, at Bellator 264. He won the bout via TKO in round three.

Mousasi made his second middleweight title defence against Austin Vanderford at Bellator 275 on February 25, 2022, at the 3Arena in Dublin, Ireland. He won the fight via technical knockout in round one.

Mousasi attempted his third middleweight title defence against Johnny Eblen at Bellator 282 on June 24, 2022 He lost the bout via 50-45 unanimous decision on all judges' scorecards.

Mousasi faced Fabian Edwards on May 12, 2023, at Bellator 296. He lost the bout via unanimous decision.

==== Departure ====
On November 20, 2023, Bellator MMA was purchased by the Professional Fighters League (PFL), and Mousasi's contract was assumed by PFL management. Approximately six months after the purchase, Mousasi expressed displeasure with PFL management, citing a lack of fights being offered and PFL's unwillingness to pay Mousasi the money guaranteed in his Bellator contract as the source of his frustration. On May 23, 2024, Mousasi was released from his PFL/Bellator contract.

On October 18, 2024, Mousasi filed a lawsuit against PFL subsidiaries Bellator Sport Worldwide LLC and New Bellator LLC, along with several key individuals from PFL/Bellator management. Mousasi alleges a variety of claims that include breach of contract, breach of the implied covenant of good faith and fair dealing, unjust enrichment, and a significant antitrust allegation of "monopsonization" under the Sherman Antitrust Act. He claims that he was misclassified as an independent contractor, which forms part of the basis for his lawsuit. Mousasi is seeking $15 million in compensatory damages, in addition to punitive damages. The lawsuit specifically targets prominent executives in the PFL organization, including PFL founder and chairman Donn Davis, PFL CEO Peter Murray, matchmaker Mike Kogan, President of Fighter Operations Ray Sefo, PFL Executive Vice President Of Business Affairs Jim Branson, and PFL VP, Business Affairs & Deputy General Counsel George Pineda.

=== Global Fight League ===
On December 11, 2024, it was announced that Mousasi was signed by Global Fight League. On January 24, 2025, Mousasi was Team London's first draft pick in the inaugural edition of Global Fight League.

Replacing Maurício Rua who withdrew for unknown reasons, Mousasi is scheduled to face former UFC Middleweight Championship challenger Yoel Romero at a to be announced date and location. In turn, in April 2025, it was reported that all GFL events were cancelled indefinitely.

== Kickboxing ==
=== K-1 Dynamite!! 2008 ===
In somewhat of a surprise to the MMA world, Mousasi agreed to take on Japanese K-1 fighter Musashi in a K-1 rules fight at Dynamite!! 2008. Being an open weight fight Mousasi weighed in at 97.8 kg/216 lb, all but confirming his desire to move up in weight classes. Mousasi stated after winning the Dream Middleweight Grand Prix he would no longer fight at middleweight due to the large weight cut. Mousasi was the rank outsider to win the match against the more experienced Musashi, but came out fast and scored a first-round KO. Mousasi went undefeated in 2008, going 6–0 in MMA and 1–0 in K-1.

=== K-1 Dynamite!! 2010 ===
After a lot of speculation about Mousasi's opponent for 2010 New Year's Eve, Mousasi was set to face Kyotaro, the K-1 Heavyweight Champion, in a K-1 rules bout. He brought the fight to Kyotaro and in the second round Mousasi knocked the Japanese fighter down, almost finishing him. Mousasi then won a unanimous decision victory from the judges.

== 2012 Summer Olympics ==
It was revealed on January 31, 2011, that Mousasi was considering trying out for the 2012 Summer Olympics at the category of boxing. Mousasi would try to qualify himself through Netherlands qualifiers. His management said that it would make him a better fighter. Mousasi is already known in amateur boxing, being a former Netherlands amateur boxing champion.

Following an injury and the signing of a new contract with Strikeforce, he gave up interest in competing in the Olympics.

== Personal life ==
Mousasi has relatives in both Iran and Armenia. He is an Armenian Apostolic Christian.

His older brother Gewik was a mixed martial artist before him, and Gegard decided to follow in his footsteps. Gewik is currently a prolific MMA trainer in Holland. He also currently handles the finances for Gegard's career payments.

Mousasi is the godfather of Satoshi Ishii's son Mousasi Ishi, who is named after him.

Mousasi's moniker, "Dream Catcher", was given by a friend which he was not fond of as he considered his style of fighting could not be named.

My friend came up with it [nickname], so blame it on him. I don't like nicknames, to be honest. I have a lot of nicknames. They called me Kingo in Japan, they called me the Young Vagabond, but that sounds bad, then Soldier of Fortune, now they call me the Dream Catcher. He said that's a good name. It's original. I read on the internet that people don't like the name. I'd rather have no nickname, but with my style, you can't really put a name on it. A good nickname for me hasn't come up. I told Strikeforce that I didn't want to use a nickname, but they put it up anyway.

== Championships and accomplishments ==
=== Boxing ===
- Nederlandse Boks Bond
  - Netherlands Amateur Boxing National Championship (2001)

=== Mixed martial arts ===
- Bellator MMA
  - Bellator Middleweight World Championship (Two times; former)
    - Three successful title defenses (overall)
    - One successful title defense (first reign)
    - Two successful title defense (second reign)
- Cage Warriors Fighting Championship
  - Cage Warriors Middleweight Championship (One time)
- DREAM
  - DREAM Middleweight Championship (One time; First; Last; Only)
  - DREAM Light Heavyweight Championship (One time; First; Last; Only)
    - One successful title defense
  - First combatant to win DREAM Championships in multiple weight classes (Two)
- Strikeforce
  - Strikeforce Light Heavyweight Championship (One time)
  - Fastest stoppage in a Strikeforce title bout (1:00; vs. Renato Sobral)
- Ultimate Fighting Championship
  - Fight of the Night (One time) vs. Lyoto Machida
  - Performance of the Night (Three times) vs. Mark Muñoz, Dan Henderson, and Thiago Santos
  - UFC.com Awards
    - 2016: Ranked #8 Fighter of the Year
- MMA Fighting
  - 2008 Fighter of the Year
- MMA HQ
  - 2008 Fighter of the Year
- Inside MMA
  - 2008 Biggest Breakthrough Bazzie Award
- World MMA Awards
  - 2009 European Fighter of the Year
- MMADNA.nl
  - 2016 Dutch Fighter of the Year
  - 2017 Dutch Fighter of the Year
- Bloody Elbow
  - 2008 #3 Ranked Fighter of the Year
  - 2008 #3 Ranked Breakout Fighter of the Year
- CBS Sports
  - 2016 #9 Ranked UFC Fighter of the Year

== Mixed martial arts record ==
Professional record breakdown
60 matches	49 wins	9 losses
By knockout	28	1
By submission	12	3
By decision	9	5
Draws	2	

Res.	Record	Opponent	Method	Event	Date	Round	Time	Location	Notes
Loss	49–9–2	Fabian Edwards	Decision (unanimous)	Bellator 296	12 May 2023	5	5:00	Paris, France	Bellator Middleweight title eliminator.
Loss	49–8–2	Johnny Eblen	Decision (unanimous)	Bellator 282	24 June 2022	5	5:00	Uncasville, Connecticut, United States	Lost the Bellator Middleweight World Championship.
Win	49–7–2	Austin Vanderford	TKO (punches)	Bellator 275	25 February 2022	1	1:25	Dublin, Ireland	Defended the Bellator Middleweight World Championship.
Win	48–7–2	John Salter	TKO (punches)	Bellator 264	13 August 2021	3	2:07	Uncasville, Connecticut, United States	Defended the Bellator Middleweight World Championship.
Win	47–7–2	Douglas Lima	Decision (unanimous)	Bellator 250	29 October 2020	5	5:00	Uncasville, Connecticut, United States	Won the vacant Bellator Middleweight World Championship.
Win	46–7–2	Lyoto Machida	Decision (split)	Bellator 228	28 September 2019	3	5:00	Inglewood, California, United States	
Loss	45–7–2	Rafael Lovato Jr.	Decision (majority)	Bellator 223	22 June 2019	5	5:00	London, England	Lost the Bellator Middleweight World Championship.
Win	45–6–2	Rory MacDonald	TKO (elbows and punches)	Bellator 206	29 September 2018	2	3:23	San Jose, California, United States	Defended the Bellator Middleweight World Championship.
Win	44–6–2	Rafael Carvalho	TKO (punches)	Bellator 200	25 May 2018	1	3:35	London, England	Won the Bellator Middleweight World Championship.
Win	43–6–2	Alexander Shlemenko	Decision (unanimous)	Bellator 185	20 October 2017	3	5:00	Uncasville, Connecticut, United States	
Win	42–6–2	Chris Weidman	TKO (knees)	UFC 210	8 April 2017	2	3:13	Buffalo, New York, United States	
Win	41–6–2	Uriah Hall	TKO (punches)	UFC Fight Night: Mousasi vs. Hall 2	19 November 2016	1	4:37	Belfast, Northern Ireland	
Win	40–6–2	Vitor Belfort	TKO (punches)	UFC 204	8 October 2016	2	2:43	Manchester, England	
Win	39–6–2	Thiago Santos	KO (punches)	UFC 200	9 July 2016	1	4:32	Las Vegas, Nevada, United States	Performance of the Night.
Win	38–6–2	Thales Leites	Decision (unanimous)	UFC Fight Night: Silva vs. Bisping	27 February 2016	3	5:00	London, England	
Loss	37–6–2	Uriah Hall	TKO (flying knee and punches)	UFC Fight Night: Barnett vs. Nelson	27 September 2015	2	0:25	Saitama, Japan	
Win	37–5–2	Costas Philippou	Decision (unanimous)	UFC Fight Night: Edgar vs. Faber	16 May 2015	3	5:00	Pasay, Philippines	
Win	36–5–2	Dan Henderson	TKO (punches)	UFC on Fox: Gustafsson vs. Johnson	24 January 2015	1	1:10	Stockholm, Sweden	Performance of the Night.
Loss	35–5–2	Ronaldo Souza	Submission (guillotine choke)	UFC Fight Night: Jacaré vs. Mousasi	5 September 2014	3	4:30	Mashantucket, Connecticut, United States	
Win	35–4–2	Mark Muñoz	Submission (rear-naked choke)	UFC Fight Night: Muñoz vs. Mousasi	31 May 2014	1	3:57	Berlin, Germany	Performance of the Night.
Loss	34–4–2	Lyoto Machida	Decision (unanimous)	UFC Fight Night: Machida vs. Mousasi	15 February 2014	5	5:00	Jaraguá do Sul, Brazil	Return to Middleweight. Fight of the Night.
Win	34–3–2	Ilir Latifi	Decision (unanimous)	UFC on Fuel TV: Mousasi vs. Latifi	6 April 2013	3	5:00	Stockholm, Sweden	
Win	33–3–2	Mike Kyle	Submission (rear-naked choke)	Strikeforce: Marquardt vs. Saffiedine	12 January 2013	1	4:09	Oklahoma City, Oklahoma, United States	
Win	32–3–2	Ovince Saint Preux	Decision (unanimous)	Strikeforce: Melendez vs. Masvidal	17 December 2011	3	5:00	San Diego, California, United States	
Win	31–3–2	Hiroshi Izumi	TKO (punches)	Dream: Japan GP Final	16 July 2011	1	3:29	Tokyo, Japan	Defended the Dream Light Heavyweight Championship.
Draw	30–3–2	Keith Jardine	Draw (majority)	Strikeforce: Diaz vs. Daley	9 April 2011	3	5:00	San Diego, California, United States	Mousasi was deducted one point in round 1 due to an illegal upkick.
Win	30–3–1	Tatsuya Mizuno	Submission (rear-naked choke)	Dream 16	25 September 2010	1	6:10	Nagoya, Japan	Won the 2010 Dream Light Heavyweight Grand Prix and the inaugural Dream Light Heavyweight Championship.
Win	29–3–1	Jake O'Brien	Submission (guillotine choke)	Dream 15	10 July 2010	1	0:31	Saitama, Japan	2010 Dream Light Heavyweight Grand Prix Semifinal; O'Brien missed weight (211 lb).
Loss	28–3–1	Muhammed Lawal	Decision (unanimous)	Strikeforce: Nashville	17 April 2010	5	5:00	Nashville, Tennessee, United States	Lost the Strikeforce Light Heavyweight Championship. Mousasi was deducted one point in round 5 due to an illegal upkick.
Win	28–2–1	Gary Goodridge	TKO (punches)	Dynamite!! 2009	31 December 2009	1	1:34	Saitama, Japan	Heavyweight bout.
Win	27–2–1	Rameau Thierry Sokoudjou	TKO (punches)	Strikeforce: Fedor vs. Rogers	7 November 2009	2	3:43	Hoffman Estates, Illinois, United States	Non-title bout.
Win	26–2–1	Renato Sobral	KO (punches)	Strikeforce: Carano vs. Cyborg	15 August 2009	1	1:00	San Jose, California, United States	Return to Light Heavyweight. Won the Strikeforce Light Heavyweight Championship.
Win	25–2–1	Mark Hunt	Submission (straight armbar)	Dream 9	26 May 2009	1	1:19	Yokohama, Japan	2009 Dream Super Hulk Grand Prix Quarterfinal.
Win	24–2–1	Ronaldo Souza	KO (upkick)	Dream 6	23 September 2008	1	2:15	Saitama, Japan	Won the 2008 Dream Middleweight Grand Prix and the inaugural Dream Middleweight Championship.
Win	23–2–1	Melvin Manhoef	Submission (triangle choke)	Dream 6	23 September 2008	1	1:28	Saitama, Japan	2008 Dream Middleweight Grand Prix Semifinal.
Win	22–2–1	Yoon Dong-sik	Decision (unanimous)	Dream 4	15 June 2008	2	5:00	Yokohama, Japan	2008 Dream Middleweight Grand Prix Quarterfinal.
Win	21–2–1	Denis Kang	Submission (triangle choke)	Dream 2	29 April 2008	1	3:10	Saitama, Japan	2008 Dream Middleweight Grand Prix Opening round.
Win	20–2–1	Steve Mensing	TKO (punches)	M-1 Challenge 1	2 March 2008	1	2:44	Landsmeer, Netherlands	
Win	19–2–1	Evangelista Santos	TKO (punches)	Hardcore CF: Destiny	1 February 2008	1	3:42	Calgary, Alberta, Canada	Catchweight (194 lb) bout.
Win	18–2–1	Damir Mirenic	TKO (punches)	Hardcore CF: Title Wave	19 October 2007	1	4:46	Calgary, Alberta, Canada	
Win	17–2–1	Kyacey Uscola	TKO (punches)	BodogFight: Vancouver	25 August 2007	1	4:56	Vancouver, British Columbia, Canada	
Win	16–2–1	Alexander Kokoev	Submission (arm-triangle choke)	M-1: Battle on the Neva 1	21 July 2007	3	5:00	Saint Petersburg, Russia	
Win	15–2–1	Gregory Bouchelaghem	TKO (submission to punches)	Cage Warriors 26	9 December 2006	1	2:20	Nottingham, England	Won the vacant Cage Warriors Middleweight Championship.
Win	14–2–1	Héctor Lombard	Decision (unanimous)	Pride Bushido 13	5 November 2006	2	5:00	Yokohama, Japan	2006 Pride Welterweight Grand Prix Alternate bout.
Loss	13–2–1	Akihiro Gono	Submission (armbar)	Pride Bushido 12	26 August 2006	2	4:24	Nagoya, Japan	2006 Pride Welterweight Grand Prix Quarterfinal.
Win	13–1–1	Makoto Takimoto	TKO (broken eye socket)	Pride Bushido Survival 2006	4 June 2006	1	5:34	Saitama, Japan	2006 Pride Welterweight Grand Prix Opening Round.
Win	12–1–1	Hidetada Irie	TKO (corner stoppage)	DEEP 24 Impact	11 April 2006	2	1:29	Tokyo, Japan	Openweight bout.
Win	11–1–1	Sanjin Kadunc	TKO (punches)	Future Battle 1	5 March 2006	1	0:35	Bergen op Zoom, Netherlands	Heavyweight debut.
Win	10–1–1	Andre Fyeet	TKO (punches)	2 Hot 2 Handle: Maastricht Fight Night 2005	17 December 2005	1	0:40	Landsmeer, Netherlands	Catchweight (198 lb) bout.
Win	9–1–1	Tsuyoshi Kurihara	KO (knee and punches)	DEEP 22 Impact	2 December 2005	1	0:10	Tokyo, Japan	
Win	8–1–1	Stefan Klever	TKO (punches)	Bushido Europe: Rotterdam Rumble	9 October 2005	1	3:39	Rotterdam, Netherlands	Light Heavyweight debut.
Win	7–1–1	Chico Martinez	Submission (rear-naked choke)	Bushido Europe: Holland vs. Russia	24 April 2005	1	4:39	Landsmeer, Netherlands	
Win	6–1–1	John Donnelly	Submission (armbar)	Rings: Bushido Ireland	12 March 2005	1	1:02	Dublin, Ireland	
Loss	5–1–1	Petras Markevicius	Submission (armbar)	Fight Festival 13	28 February 2005	2	1:49	Helsinki, Finland	
Win	5–0–1	Erik Oganov	Submission (rear-naked choke)	M-1 : International Fight Night 4	5 February 2005	1	2:16	Saint Petersburg, Russia	
Win	4–0–1	Rody Trost	TKO (punches)	International Mix-Fight Association: Staredown City 2004	19 December 2004	1	3:18	Landsmeer, Netherlands	
Win	3–0–1	Niko Puhakka	Submission (rear-naked choke)	Fight Festival 11	11 September 2004	2	2:17	Helsinki, Finland	
Draw	2–0–1	Gilson Ferreira	Draw	Together Productions: Fight Gala 21	15 November 2003	2	5:00	Zaandam, Netherlands	
Win	2–0	Xander Nel	TKO (punches)	International Mix-Fight Association: Night of the Knights 4	12 October 2003	1	1:05	Badhoevedorp, Netherlands	
Win	1–0	Daniel Spek	TKO (punches)	2 Hot 2 Handle: 1st Open Team	27 April 2003	1	3:40	Amsterdam, Netherlands	Middleweight debut.

== Kickboxing record ==
Gegard Mousasi kickboxing record
5 wins (3 (T)KO's)
Date	Result	Opponent	Event	Location	Method	Round	Time	Record
2010-12-31	Win	(Japan) Kyotaro	Dynamite!! 2010	Saitama, Japan	Decision (unanimous)	3	3:00	5–0
K-1 rules 3 x 3.
2008-12-31	Win	(Japan) Musashi	Dynamite!! 2008	Saitama, Japan	TKO (referee stoppage)	1	2:32	4–0
K-1 rules 3 x 3.
2004-10-16	Win	(Netherlands) Enrico Grootenhuis	Muay Thai & Mixfight Gala	Emmen, Netherlands	KO (strikes)	1	0:35	3–0
Muay Thai rules (B-class 5 x 2).
2004-01-25	Win	(Netherlands) Arno Hilckmann	Muay Thai Gala	Alkmaar, Netherlands	Decision (unanimous)	3	2:00	2–0
Muay Thai rules (C-class 3 x 2).
2003-06-14	Win	(Netherlands) Surinder Baghola	Muay Thai Warrior	Rhoon, Netherlands	TKO (strikes)	1	1:04	1–0
Muay Thai rules (C-class 3 x 2).
Legend: Win Loss Draw/No contest Notes

== See also ==
- List of current mixed martial arts champions
- List of Strikeforce alumni
- List of male mixed martial artists

New championship	1st Dream Middleweight Champion; September 23, 2008 – May 26, 2009	Vacant Mousasi move to light heavyweight
New championship	1st Dream Light Heavyweight Champion; September 25, 2010 – Present	Incumbent
Preceded by Renato Sobral	3rd Strikeforce Light Heavyweight Champion; August 15, 2009 – April 17, 2010	Succeeded by Muhammed Lawal
Preceded by Rafael Carvalho	5th Bellator Middleweight Champion; May 25, 2018 – June 22, 2019	Succeeded by Rafael Lovato Jr.
Preceded by Rafael Lovato Jr.	7th Bellator Middleweight Champion; October 29, 2020 – Present	Incumbent
