= Danni McCormack =

Irish MMA fighter (born 1990)

- Born: 15 March 1990 (age 36); Castlecoote, County Roscommon, Ireland
- Height: 5 ft 6 in (1.68 m)
- Weight: 115 lb (52 kg; 8 st 3 lb)
- Division: Strawweight (2019–2023); Flyweight (2024)
- Fighting out of: Dublin, Ireland
- Team: SBG Ireland
- Years active: 2019–2024

Mixed martial arts record
- Total: 11
- Wins: 9
- By knockout: 1
- By submission: 2
- By decision: 6
- Losses: 2
- By knockout: 1
- By submission: 0
- By decision: 1

Other information
- Mixed martial arts record from Sherdog

Danni McCormack (née Neilan; born 15 March 1990) is an Irish former professional mixed martial artist. She competed in the strawweight division of Invicta FC where she is a former Invicta FC Strawweight Champion. She also had a stint in Bellator.

== Professional mixed martial arts career ==
=== Bellator ===
In her professional MMA debut, Neilan faced Camila Rivarola at Bellator 227 on 27 September 2019. She won the fight by unanimous decision.

Neilan faced Chiara Penco at Bellator 240 on 22 February 2020. She also won the fight by unanimous decision.

Neilan faced Claire Lopez at Bellator Milan 2 on 26 September 2020. She won the fight via a rear-naked choke submission in the second round.

Neilan faced Audrey Kerouche at Bellator 270 on 5 November 2021. She won the bout via third-round technical knockout.

McCormack faced Stéphanie Page on 25 February 2022, at Bellator 275. She lost the bout via first-round technical knockout, making it her first loss in her professional career.

=== Invicta FC ===
McCormack faced Maíra Mazar on 16 November 2022, at Invicta FC 50. She won the bout by unanimous decision.

==== Invicta FC Strawweight Champion ====
McCormack faced Valesca Machado for the Invicta FC Strawweight Championship on 15 March 2023, at Invicta FC 52. She won the bout and title via unanimous decision.

In the first title defense, McCormack faced Karolina Wójcik on 27 October 2023, at Invicta FC 54: McCormack vs. Wójcik. She won the fight via rear-naked choke in the fourth round.

=== Road to UFC and retirement ===
McCormack faced Yan Qihui on 23 August 2024, at Road to UFC Season 3: Episode 5. She won the bout by unanimous decision.

On 6 February 2026, McCormack announced her retirement from MMA competition.

== Personal life ==
McCormack is married to Alan McCormack who also trained her. They have a son who was born in 2025.

== Championships and accomplishments ==
=== Mixed martial arts ===
- Invicta Fighting Championships
  - Invicta FC Strawweight Championship (One time)
- Fight Matrix
  - 2020 Female Rookie of the Year

== Mixed martial arts record ==
Professional record breakdown
11 matches	9 wins	2 losses
By knockout	1	1
By submission	2	0
By decision	6	1

Res.	Record	Opponent	Method	Event	Date	Round	Time	Location	Notes
Win	9–2	Yan Qihui	Decision (unanimous)	Road to UFC Season 3: Episode 5	August 23, 2024	3	5:00	Las Vegas, Nevada, United States	Flyweight debut.
Win	8–2	Karolina Wójcik	Technical Submission (rear-naked choke)	Invicta FC 54	October 27, 2023	4	1:22	Boston, Massachusetts, United States	Defended the Invicta FC Strawweight Championship.
Win	7–2	Valesca Machado	Decision (unanimous)	Invicta FC 52	March 15, 2023	5	5:00	Denver, Colorado, United States	Won the Invicta FC Strawweight Championship.
Win	6–2	Maíra Mazar	Decision (unanimous)	Invicta FC 50	November 16, 2022	3	5:00	Denver, Colorado, United States	
Loss	5–2	Manuela Marconetto	Decision (split)	Centurion FC Malta 8	July 2, 2022	3	5:00	Fort Saint Elmo, Malta	
Loss	5–1	Stéphanie Page	TKO (punches)	Bellator 275	February 25, 2022	1	1:46	Dublin, Ireland	
Win	5–0	Audrey Kerouche	TKO (punches)	Bellator 270	November 5, 2021	3	3:58	Dublin, Ireland	
Win	4–0	Katharina Dalisda	Decision (unanimous)	National FC 4	July 25, 2021	3	5:00	Bonn, Germany	
Win	3–0	Claire Lopez	Submission (rear-naked choke)	Bellator Milan 2	September 26, 2020	2	3:45	Milan, Italy	
Win	2–0	Chiara Penco	Decision (unanimous)	Bellator 240	February 22, 2020	3	5:00	Dublin, Ireland	
Win	1–0	Camila Rivarola	Decision (unanimous)	Bellator 227	September 27, 2019	3	5:00	Dublin, Ireland	Strawweight debut.
