= Bellator 270 =

Bellator mixed martial arts event in 2021

Bellator 270: Queally vs. Pitbull 2
- The poster for Bellator 270: Queally vs. Pitbull 2
- Promotion: Bellator MMA
- Date: November 5, 2021
- Venue: 3Arena
- City: Dublin, Ireland

Event chronology
Bellator 269: Fedor vs. Johnson	Bellator 270: Queally vs. Pitbull 2	Bellator 271: Cyborg vs. Kavanagh

Bellator 270: Queally vs. Pitbull 2 (also known as Bellator Dublin) was a mixed martial arts event produced by Bellator MMA that took place on November 5, 2021 at 3Arena in Dublin, Ireland. The event marked Bellator's first return to Irish soil since February 2020.

== Background ==
A lightweight bout between #1 ranked Patricky Pitbull and #4 ranked Peter Queally served as the headliner for this event. This was a rematch of their first bout that was stopped by the doctor due to a cut on Patricky at Bellator 258. Originally set to be the co-headliner, the bout was promoted to the main event on October 6, 2021, when Patricky Pitbull's younger brother and Bellator MMA Lightweight World Champion Patrício Pitbull announced he was vacating the title, not wanting to get in the way of his older brothers title aspirations. Patricky Pitbull vs. Peter Queally was for the vacant Bellator Lightweight World Championship.

A bantamweight bout between Patchy Mix and James Gallagher served as the co-headliner for this event. The first scheduled booking between the two 135-pound contenders was supposed to take place at Bellator 258 on May 7, 2021. However, Gallagher withdrew from the bout for undisclosed reasons. Mix instead faced UFC alum Albert Morales, whom he defeated via third-round submission.

On September 2, Bellator announced that a matchup between former featherweight title challengers #6 ranked Daniel Weichel and #7 ranked Pedro Carvalho, and a middleweight bout between #6 ranked Charlie Ward and #9 ranked Norbert Növényi Jr. would appear on the main card as well. On October 6, Norbert announced that he had suffered a torn ACL and had to pull out of the bout and was replaced by #4 ranked Fabian Edwards. Ward had to pull out however due to a ruptured bicep and was replaced by promotional newcomer Robert Fonseca. Fonseca couldn't get paperwork sorted in time and the bout was scratched, with no replacement sought. Ilias Bulaid vs. Georges Sasu was moved to the main card.

A lightweight bout between Darragh Kelly and Junior Morgan was scheduled for this event, however Morgan fell the night of the event and concussed himself, leading to the bout being scrapped.

At the weigh-ins, Patchy Mix missed weight for his bout, weighing in at 137.8 pounds, 1.7 pounds over the bantamweight non-title fight limit. The bout proceeded at catchweight and Mix was fined a percentage of his purse which went to his opponent James Gallagher.

== Results ==
Fight card (Showtime)
Weight class				Method	Round	Time	Notes
Lightweight	Patricky Pitbull	def.	Peter Queally	TKO (punches)	2	1:05	(Note: For the vacant Bellator Lightweight World Championship.)
Catchweight (137.8 lb)	Patchy Mix	def.	James Gallagher	Submission (guillotine choke)	3	0:39	(Note: Originally a bantamweight bout; Mix missed weight.)
Featherweight	Pedro Carvalho	def.	Daniel Weichel	Decision (unanimous) (29-28, 29-28, 29-28)	3	5:00
Featherweight	Ilias Bulaid	def.	Georges Sasu	Decision (split) (29-28, 28-29, 30-27)	3	5:00
Preliminary card (Youtube/Pluto TV)
Featherweight	Ciaran Clarke	def.	Jordan Barton	Submission (rear-naked choke)	3	4:11
Lightweight	Daniele Scatizzi	def.	Brian Hooi	Decision (unanimous) (29-28, 29-28, 29-28)	3	5:00
Light Heavyweight	Lee Chadwick	def.	Arunas Andriuskevicus	Decision (split) (28-29, 30-27, 29-28)	3	5:00
Heavyweight	Gökhan Saricam	def.	Charlie Milner	KO (punches)	1	0:15
Welterweight	Nicolò Solli	vs.	Bobby Pallett	No Contest (Overturned)	3	5:00	(Note: Originally a split decision (30-27, 28-29, 29-28) victory for Solli, the result was overturned to a "No Contest")
Women's Strawweight	Danni McCormack	def.	Audrey Kerouche	TKO (punches)	3	3:58
Welterweight	Yusuf Nazokatov	def.	Stephen Costello	Submission (heel hook)	2	2:24

== See also ==
- 2021 in Bellator MMA
- List of Bellator MMA events
- List of current Bellator MMA fighters
