= The Ultimate Fighter: Team Cormier vs. Team Bisping =

UFC mixed martial arts television series

- Starring: Dana White
- Hosted by: Dana White
- Coaches: Daniel Cormier; Michael Bisping
- Location: Las Vegas, Nevada, United States
- No. of episodes: 12

Release
- Original network: Paramount+
- Original release: June 14, 2026

Season chronology
- ← Previous; The Ultimate Fighter: Team Cormier vs. Team Sonnen

The Ultimate Fighter: Team Cormier vs. Team Bisping (also known as The Ultimate Fighter 34 and TUF 34) is a 2026 installment of the Ultimate Fighting Championship (UFC)-produced reality television series The Ultimate Fighter on Paramount+. This season featured male bantamweights and women's strawweights. The casting call for the season ran from March 2, 2026, to March 27, 2026, and the show aired every Tuesday after its debut on June 14, 2026.

Former UFC Heavyweight and UFC Light Heavyweight Champion Daniel Cormier and former UFC Middleweight Champion Michael Bisping served as coaches for the season.

== Cast ==
=== Coaches ===
Team Cormier:

- Daniel Cormier, Head Coach

Team Bisping:

- Michael Bisping, Head Coach

=== Fighters ===
- Team Cormier
  - Men's Bantamweights: Artem Belakh, Micaias Ureña, Sean Mora, and Christian Strong.
  - Women's Strawweights: Valesca Machado, Delphine Benouaich, Melissa Amaya, and Anita Karim.
- Team Bisping
  - Men's Bantameights: Xavier Franklin, Mehemmedeli Osmanli, Ilimbek Akylbek uulu, and Marlon Jones.
  - Women's Strawweights: Anna Melisano, Giovanna Canuto, Mackenzie Stiller, and Natalia Alves.

Coach	1st Pick	2nd Pick	3rd Pick	4th Pick	5th Pick	6th Pick	7th Pick	8th Pick
Cormier	Artem Belakh (BW)	Valesca Machado (WSW)	Micaias Ureña (BW)	Delphine Benouaich (WSW)	Sean Mora (BW)	Melissa Amaya (WSW)	Christian Strong (BW)	Anita Karim (WSW)
Bisping	Xavier Franklin (BW)	Anna Melisano (WSW)	Mehemmedeli Osmanli (BW)	Giovanna Canuto (WSW)	Ilimbek Akylbek uulu (BW)	Mackenzie Stiller (WSW)	Marlon Jones (BW)	Natalia Alves (WSW)

== Tournament bracket ==
=== Bantamweight bracket ===
Quarter-finals
Christian Strong	UD
Marlon Jones	2
Artem Belakh	1
Mehemedeli Osmanli	SUB
Sean Mora	2
Ilimbek Akylbek uulu	SD
Micaias Ureña	1
Xavier Franklin	KO

Semi-finals
Christian Strong	2
Mehemedeli Osmanli	SUB
Ilimbek Akylbek uulu	UD
Xavier Franklin	3

Final
Mehemedeli Osmanli	1
Ilimbek Akylbek uulu	DQ

=== Women's Strawweight bracket ===
Quarter-finals
Melissa Amaya	SUB
Anna Melisano	1
Anita Karim	1
Giovanna Canuto	TKO
Valesca Machado	TKO
Natalia Alves	2
Delphine Benouaich	UD
Mackenzie Stiller	3

Semi-finals
Melissa Amaya	TKO
Giovanna Canuto	2
Valesca Machado	UD
Delphine Benouaich	3

Final
Melissa Amaya	2
Valesca Machado	TKO

	Team Cormier
	Team Bisping
UD	Unanimous Decision
MD	Majority Decision
SD	Split Decision
SUB	Submission
(T)KO	(Technical) Knock Out
DQ	Disqualification

== See also ==
- The Ultimate Fighter
- List of UFC events
- 2026 in UFC
- List of current UFC fighters
