= Peter Queally (fighter) =

Irish mixed martial arts fighter

- Born: February 19, 1985 (age 41); Dungarvan, Ireland
- Other names: The Showstopper
- Nationality: Irish
- Height: 5 ft 11 in (1.80 m)
- Weight: 155 lb (70 kg; 11 st 1 lb)
- Division: Welterweight; Lightweight
- Reach: 74.5 in (189 cm)
- Fighting out of: Dublin, Ireland
- Team: Straight Blast Gym Ireland
- Years active: 2012–present

Mixed martial arts record
- Total: 23
- Wins: 13
- By knockout: 3
- By decision: 10
- Losses: 8
- By knockout: 2
- By decision: 6
- Draws: 1
- No contests: 1

Other information
- Mixed martial arts record from Sherdog

Peter Queally (born February 19, 1985) is an Irish mixed martial artist currently competing in the Lightweight division. A professional competitor since 2012, he has also competed for Bellator MMA, Extreme Fighting Championship, BAMMA, Cage Warriors and Fight Nights Global.

== Background ==
Born in Dungarvan, County Waterford he is currently fighting out of Dublin, Ireland, he is a member of SBG Ireland with head coach John Kavanagh with notable teammates such as Conor McGregor, Artem Lobov & Gunnar Nelson. He is the owner/coach of SBG in Naas, County Kildare.

== Mixed martial arts career ==
=== Early career ===
Queally began training Brazilian jiu-jitsu at the age of 21, where he eventually achieved his blue belt.

Queally held an amateur record of 4–1 since the beginning of his Mixed Martial Artist career in 2010. Queally made his professional MMA debut in European based promotion Cage Contenders in 2012 and won via unanimous decision against opponent Kieran O'Donnell. Queally would quickly obtain three decision wins on the regional scene before making the step up to Cage Warriors, where he lost his first fight. Queally fought in South Africa for Extreme Fighting Championship, before fighting in Italy and Poland, where he won both of his fights.

In 2016 Queally had two bouts in BAMMA, where he went 1-1.

=== Fight Nights Global ===
Then, in 2017 came a series of bouts under the Fight Night Global banner which saw him compete in Russia and Kazakhstan. In his first bout, Queally faced Igor Egorov at Fight Nights Global 64 on April 27, 2017. He won the bout via unanimous decision.

After losing a close majority decision to Islam Begidov at Fight Nights Global 72, Queally faced Kuat Khamitov at Fight Nights Global 80. After the bout was originally ruled a majority decision win for Kuat, the bout was overturned to a draw by the Russian MMA Union after they decided that Khamitov did no damage with the takedowns and rarely looked like he was in control of Queally at any point. Arguably, Queally did more damage in his defensive positions than Khamitov did looking to secure the Irishman on his back.

His stint in Fight Nights Global culminated in a sensational first-round finish of the then 24-3 Armenian standout David Khachatryan at Fight Nights Global 87: Khachatryan vs. Queally.

After making controversial comments in a post-fight interview comparing Ireland to Allah Peter Queally's contract with Fight Nights Global was ended in the summer of 2018.

=== Bellator MMA ===
With a record of 11–4–1, Queally signed with renowned American mixed martial arts promotion Bellator in 2018 and lost his Bellator debut against fellow Irish fighter Myles Price at Bellator 217 on February 23, 2019, at the 3Arena Dublin, Ireland. The fight was labeled as the "biggest fight in Irish MMA history" by fellow coach John Kavanagh due to the pair of fighters having previously trained under Straight Blast Gyms which Myles Price leaving to American Kickboxing Academy in San Jose, California to help current UFC Lightweight Champion Khabib Nurmagomedov spar in Khabib's scheduled fight against Irish fighter Conor McGregor at UFC 229 on 7 October 2018. The fight ended with a split decision victory for Myles Price.

Queally face Ryan Scope on September 27, 2019, at Bellator 227. Making a come back, Queally defeated Scope via TKO in the second round.

Queally was scheduled to face Brent Primus at Bellator 240. However, Queally was forced to pull out on January 30, 2020, with a LCL tear. He stated that he was ‘absolutely devastated’ to not be featuring at the event.

Queally faced Patricky Pitbull at Bellator 258 on May 7, 2021. After Queally caused a cut on Patricky's forehead from an elbow while was on the bottom, the doctor stopped the fight between rounds after the cutman was unable to stop the bleeding.

Queally rematched against Patricky Pitbull for Bellator 270 on November 5, 2021. On October 6, 2021, Patricky's younger brother and Bellator MMA Lightweight Champion Patrício Pitbull announced he was vacating the title. Patricky Pitbull vs. Peter Queally was then set to be for the vacant Bellator MMA Lightweight Championship. Queally lost the bout via second-round technical knockout.

Queally was scheduled to face Kane Mousah on February 25, 2022, at Bellator 275. However, he was forced to withdraw due to an undisclosed injury.

Queally faced former UFC Lightweight champion Benson Henderson on September 23, 2022, at Bellator Dublin. He lost the bout via unanimous decision.

Queally faced Bryce Logan on February 25, 2023, at Bellator 291. He lost the fight via TKO in the second round.

Returning to welterweight, Queally faced Daniele Miceli on September 23, 2023, at Bellator 299. The bout ended in a no contest after an illegal soccer kick in the opening minute of round one rendered Queally unable to continue.

== Mixed martial arts record ==
Professional record breakdown
23 matches	13 wins	8 losses
By knockout	3	2
By decision	10	6
Draws	1	
No contests	1	

Res.	Record	Opponent	Method	Event	Date	Round	Time	Location	Notes
NC	13–8–1 (1)	Daniele Miceli	NC (illegal soccer kick)	Bellator 299	September 23, 2023	1	0:26	Dublin, Ireland	Return to Welterweight. Accidental illegal soccer kick rendered Queally unable to continue.
Loss	13–8–1	Bryce Logan	TKO (elbow and punches)	Bellator 291	February 25, 2023	2	2:32	Dublin, Ireland	
Loss	13–7–1	Benson Henderson	Decision (unanimous)	Bellator 285	September 23, 2022	5	5:00	Dublin, Ireland	Henderson was deducted one point in round 2 due to a groin strike.
Loss	13–6–1	Patricky Pitbull	TKO (punches)	Bellator 270	November 5, 2021	2	1:05	Dublin, Ireland	For the vacant Bellator Lightweight World Championship.
Win	13–5–1	Patricky Pitbull	TKO (doctor stoppage)	Bellator 258	May 7, 2021	2	5:00	Uncasville, Connecticut, United States	
Win	12–5–1	Ryan Scope	TKO (punches)	Bellator 227	September 27, 2019	2	3:07	Dublin, Ireland	
Loss	11–5–1	Myles Price	Decision (split)	Bellator 217	February 23, 2019	3	5:00	Dublin, Ireland	
Win	11–4–1	David Khachatryan	KO (punches)	Fight Nights Global 87: Khachatryan vs. Queally	May 19, 2018	1	3:52	Rostov-on-Don, Russia	
Draw	10–4–1	Kuat Khamitov	Draw (Overturned by Russian MMA Union)	Fight Nights Global 80: Khamitov vs. Queally	November 26, 2017	5	5:00	Almaty, Kazakhstan	Catchweight (165 lb) bout. Originally a majority decision win for Khamitov.
Loss	10–4	Islam Begidov	Decision (majority)	Fight Nights Global 72: Hill vs. Engibaryan	August 24, 2017	3	5:00	Sochi, Russia	
Win	10–3	Igor Egorov	Decision (unanimous)	Fight Nights Global 64: Nam vs. Bagautinov	April 28, 2017	3	5:00	Moscow, Russia	
Win	9–3	Decky Dalton	Decision (unanimous)	Cage Legacy Fighting Championship 1	October 28, 2016	3	5:00	Drogheda, Ireland	Return to Lightweight.
Loss	8–3	Joe McColgan	Decision (unanimous)	BAMMA 26: Saadeh vs. Young	September 10, 2016	3	5:00	Dublin, Ireland	
Win	8–2	Nathan Jones	Decision (unanimous)	BAMMA 24: Ireland vs. England	February 27, 2016	3	5:00	Dublin, Ireland	
Win	7–2	Roberto Rigamonti	Decision (unanimous)	Venator FC 2: Schiavolin vs. Barnatt	December 12, 2015	3	5:00	Rimini, Italy	
Win	6–2	Tomasz Jakubiec	Decision (unanimous)	XCage 8/PLMMA 57	September 9, 2015	3	5:00	Toruń, Poland	
Loss	5–2	Igeu Kabesa	Decision (split)	Extreme Fighting Championship 40	June 15, 2015	3	5:00	Johannesburg, South Africa	Lightweight bout.
Win	5–1	Francois Kabulu	Decision (unanimous)	Extreme Fighting Championship 35	November 6, 2014	3	5:00	Cape Town, South Africa	
Win	4–1	Konrad Iwanowski	Decision (unanimous)	Cage Warriors Fighting Championship 70	August 16, 2014	3	5:00	Dublin, Ireland	Welterweight debut.
Loss	3–1	Chris Boujard	Decision (unanimous)	Cage Warriors Fighting Championship 63	December 31, 2013	3	5:00	Dublin, Ireland	Catchweight (159 lb) bout.
Win	3–0	Diego Coloma	Decision (unanimous)	Cage Contender 16	February 23, 2013	3	5:00	Dublin, Ireland	
Win	2–0	Mick Kay	Decision (unanimous)	OMMAC 15: Legacy	October 16, 2012	3	5:00	Liverpool, England	
Win	1–0	Kieran O'Donnell	Decision (unanimous)	Cage Contender 12	February 25, 2012	3	5:00	Dublin, Ireland	Lightweight debut.

== See also ==
- List of male mixed martial artists
