= Josiah Harrell =

American mixed martial artist (born 1998)

- Born: November 13, 1998 (age 27); Columbus, Ohio, U.S.
- Other names: Muscle Hamster
- Height: 5 ft 7 in (170 cm)
- Weight: 155 lb (70 kg; 11 st 1 lb)
- Division: Lightweight
- Reach: 68 in (173 cm)
- Fighting out of: Grove City, Ohio, U.S.
- Team: Grove City BJJ Academy
- Rank: Brown belt in Brazilian jiu-jitsu
- Years active: 2018–present

Mixed martial arts record
- Total: 13
- Wins: 11
- By knockout: 6
- By submission: 4
- By decision: 1
- Losses: 2
- By knockout: 2

Other information
- Mixed martial arts record from Sherdog

Josiah Harrell (born November 13, 1998) is an American professional mixed martial artist. He currently competes in the Lightweight division of the Ultimate Fighting Championship (UFC).

== Early life and education ==
Harrell was born on November 13, 1998 in Columbus, Ohio. He graduated from Licking Heights High School in 2017, where he played football and collegiate wrestling. He initially intended to play football at the University of Cincinnati, but did not do so due to financial constraints. He would go on to start competing in mixed martial arts at the advice of a former wrestling coach. His nickname, the "Muscle Hamster", came from a joke made by his football coach and was inspired by Tampa Bay Buccaneers running back Doug Martin.

== Mixed martial arts career ==
=== Early and professional career ===
Harrell made his MMA debut in 2018, drawing against Jerald Spohn at a BCM Promotions event in Mansfield, Ohio. He fought multiple matches at events by various organizers, including BCM Promotions, the Ohio Combat League, Cage Fury Fighting Championships (CFFC), and the Legacy Fighting Alliance (LFA). During this time, he initially fought in the Welterweight class.

Harrell won by unanimous decision against Ashton Kirby as part of Ohio Combat League 3 in Columbus in 2019. He later won numerous fights, both in amateur MMA and in professional matches, primarily with the Ohio Combat League.

Harrell was initially slated to face Jack Della Maddalena at UFC 290 at T-Mobile Arena in Paradise, Nevada in 2023 after Della Maddalena's previous opponent, Sean Brady, withdrew due to a Streptococcus pyogenes infection on his elbow. However, during pre-medical screenings, it was discovered that Harrell had Moyamoya disease, a rare disease that constricts some arteries in the brain. He withdrew the day before the match as a result.

By 2025, he returned to fighting MMA, returning to fight matches in the Ohio Combat League, winning by TKO against Quinton Parks Jr. at Ohio Combat League 36 on March 1, 2025.

=== Ultimate Fighting Championship ===
Harrell made his debut at UFC at UFC Fight Night 267 at the Toyota Center in Houston, Texas against Jacobe Smith. Smith was slated to face Ko Seok-hyeon, but Ko withdrew due to injuries. Harrell replaced Ko for the match against Smith. Harrell lost to Smith by KO.

Harrell later faced Elves Brener at UFC Vegas 121 on September 26, 2026, at the Meta Apex in Enterprise, Nevada. Harrell moved down from Welterweight class to Lightweight class for this match. He was defeated by Brener by TKO.

== Personal life ==
In 2023, while doing routine medical exams for his planned debut fight with Della Maddalena, it was discovered Harrell had Moyamoya disease, a rare disease that constricts certain arteries in the brain. He underwent brain surgery at Stanford Medical Center in Stanford, California to treat the disease in 2024. After experiencing complications in the recovery process, including seizures, Harrell began to recover from the surgery. He received support from fellow MMA fighter Vince Murdock, who similarly was diagnosed with Moyamoya during his MMA career. By 2025, he had recovered sufficiently enough from the surgery to return to fighting MMA.

Harrell identifies as Christian.

== Mixed martial arts record ==
Professional record breakdown
13 matches	11 wins	2 losses
By knockout	6	2
By submission	4	0
By decision	1	0

Res.	Record	Opponent	Method	Event	Date	Round	Time	Location	Notes
Loss	11–2	Elves Brener	TKO (punches)	UFC Fight Night: Rosas Jr. vs. Barcelos	September 26, 2026	1	4:14	Las Vegas, Nevada, United States	Return to Lightweight.
Loss	11–1	Jacobe Smith	KO (punches)	UFC Fight Night: Strickland vs. Hernandez	February 21, 2026	1	3:01	Houston, Texas, United States	
Win	11–0	Bekmyrza Dosmatov	TKO (corner stoppage)	LFA 224	January 16, 2026	3	3:28	Prior Lake, Minnesota, United States	
Win	10–0	Kegan Gennrich	Decision (unanimous)	Ohio Combat League 39	August 2, 2025	3	5:00	Newport, Kentucky, United States	Won the vacant OCL Welterweight Championship.
Win	9–0	Melvin Guillard	Submission (rear-naked choke)	Ohio Combat League 38	May 17, 2025	1	3:25	Newport, Kentucky, United States	
Win	8–0	Quinton Parks Jr.	TKO (punches)	Ohio Combat League 36	March 1, 2025	2	3:34	Columbus, Ohio, United States	
Win	7–0	Michael Roberts	TKO (punches)	LFA 160	June 16, 2023	3	3:27	Owensboro, Kentucky, United States	Catchweight (162 lb) bout.
Win	6–0	Tracey Reeder	TKO (punches)	Cage Fury FC 113	October 8, 2022	2	2:59	Atlantic City, New Jersey, United States	Lightweight bout.
Win	5–0	John Ramirez	TKO (punches)	Ohio Combat League 18	March 5, 2022	3	2:23	Columbus, Ohio, United States	Welterweight debut. Won the vacant OCL Welterweight Championship.
Win	4–0	Homer Mangram	Submission (rear-naked choke)	Ohio Combat League 16	November 20, 2021	1	2:59	Grove City, Ohio, United States	Catchweight (160 lb) bout.
Win	3–0	Timothy Tyler	TKO (knee injury)	Ohio Combat League 14	July 14, 2021	1	5:00	Newark, Ohio, United States	Catchweight (165 lb) bout.
Win	2–0	Carlos Garnett Jr.	Submission (rear-naked choke)	Ohio Combat League 10	March 5, 2021	2	4:56	Newark, Ohio, United States	
Win	1–0	William Worley	Submission (armbar)	Ohio Combat League 7	March 7, 2020	2	4:25	Columbus, Ohio, United States	Lightweight debut.
