= Valesca Machado =

Brazilian mixed martial artist (born 1996)

- Valesca Machado in 2025
- Born: May 6, 1996 (age 30); Rio de Janeiro, Brazil
- Other names: Tina Black
- Height: 5 ft 4 in (1.63 m)
- Weight: 115 lb (52 kg; 8 st 3 lb)
- Division: Strawweight
- Fighting out of: Rio de Janeiro, Brazil
- Team: Team Alpha Male
- Years active: 2016–present

Mixed martial arts record
- Total: 21
- Wins: 16
- By knockout: 6
- By submission: 1
- By decision: 9
- Losses: 4
- By decision: 4
- No contests: 1

Other information
- Mixed martial arts record from Sherdog

Valesca Machado (born May 6, 1996), better known by her ring name Tina Black, is a Brazilian mixed martial artist (MMA) who currently competes in the strawweight division. She previously competed in the Invicta Fighting Championships, where she is a former Invicta FC Strawweight Champion.

== Early life ==
Machado grew up in a favela and was given the childhood nickname "Tinininha" by her brother. As she grew older, people began calling her "Tina." When she began her fighting career, she initially competed under the name "Tina Silva." Her friend, former UFC fighter Poliana Botelho, suggested she change her surname to "Black" due to her large afro hair. Machado has stated that while many assume the name refers to her skin color, it was originally inspired by her hair. She has since adopted the name as a statement against prejudice and a way to represent Black people in MMA.

== Mixed martial arts career ==
=== Early career ===
Machado began her professional MMA career in 2016 and mainly fought in Brazil until 2022. She amassed a record of 9–3 prior to being signed by Invicta.

Machado faced Piera Rodríguez at Dana White's Contender Series 44 on October 19, 2021. She lost the fight via split decision.

=== Invicta Fighting Championships ===
Machado made her Invicta debut on September 28, 2022, at Invicta FC 49 against Liz Tracy. She won the fight via unanimous decision.

Machado faced Ediana Silva in the Invicta FC Flyweight Championship semi-final match at Invicta FC 50 on November 16. She won the fight via split decision. Later in the night, Machado faced Karolina Wójcik in the tournament final. She won the fight via unanimous decision.

Valesco defended the title against Danni McCormack on March 15, 2023 at Invicta FC 52. She lost the fight via unanimous decision.

After losing the title, Machado was scheduled to face Isis Verbeek on October 27, 2023, at Invicta FC 54: McCormack vs. Wójcik. However, Verbeek withdrew for unknown reasons and was replaced by Kalindra Faria.

Machado faced Taylor Mauldin for the A1 Combat Strawweight Championship at A1 Combat 18 on February 22, 2024. She won the bout by knockout via punches in the first round to win the title.

Machado faced Yulia Ostroverkhova on August 9, 2024, at Invicta FC 56: Maia vs. Cantuária. She won the bout via unanimous decision.

Machado faced Yasmin Castanho at Invicta FC 59 on December 13, 2024. She won the bout by unanimous decision.

=== The Ultimate Fighter ===
Machado faced Melissa Amaya on September 26, 2026 in the The Ultimate Fighter 34 women's strawweight final at UFC Fight Night 289. She won the fight via a knockout in the second round, securing a contract with the UFC.

== Championships and accomplishments ==
=== Mixed martial arts ===
- Ultimate Fighting Championship
  - The Ultimate Fighter 34 Women's Strawweight winner
- A1 Combat
  - A1 Combat Women's Strawweight Championship (One time)
- Invicta Fighting Championships
  - Invicta FC Strawweight Championship (One time)
- TF Team
  - TF Team Women's Strawweight Championship (One time)
- Cageside Press
  - 2022 Women's Strawweight Prospect of the Year

== Mixed martial arts record ==
Professional record breakdown
21 matches	16 wins	4 losses
By knockout	6	0
By submission	1	0
By decision	9	4
No contests	1	

Res.	Record	Opponent	Method	Event	Date	Round	Time	Location	Notes
Win	16–4 (1)	Melissa Amaya	TKO (punches)	UFC Fight Night: Rosas Jr. vs. Barcelos	26 September 2026	2	3:19	Las Vegas, Nevada, United States	Won The Ultimate Fighter 34 Women's Strawweight Tournament.
Win	15–4 (1)	Yasmin Castanho	Decision (unanimous)	Invicta FC 59	13 December 2024	3	5:00	Atlanta, Georgia, United States	
Win	14–4 (1)	Yulia Ostroverkhova	Decision (unanimous)	Invicta FC 56	9 August 2024	3	5:00	Denver, Colorado, United States	
Win	13–4 (1)	Taylor Mauldin	KO (punches)	Urijah Faber's A1 Combat 18	22 February 2024	1	0:50	Lemoore, California, United States	Won the A1 Combat Strawweight Championship.
Loss	12–4 (1)	Danni McCormack	Decision (unanimous)	Invicta FC 52	15 March 2023	5	5:00	Denver, Colorado, United States	Lost the Invicta FC Strawweight Championship.
Win	12–3 (1)	Karolina Wójcik	Decision (unanimous)	Invicta FC 50	16 November 2022	3	5:00	Denver, Colorado, United States	Won the Invicta FC Strawweight Tournament and the vacant Invicta FC Strawweight Championship.
Win	11–3 (1)	Ediana Silva	Decision (split)	Invicta FC 50	16 November 2022	3	5:00	Denver, Colorado, United States	Invicta FC Strawweight Tournament Semifinal.
Win	10–3 (1)	Liz Tracy	Decision (unanimous)	Invicta FC 49	28 September 2022	3	5:00	Hinton, Oklahoma, United States	
Win	9–3 (1)	Janelice Moraes	Submission (rear-naked choke)	Arena Global 16	19 February 2022	1	4:56	Rio de Janeiro, Brazil	
Loss	8–3 (1)	Piera Rodríguez	Decision (unanimous)	Dana White's Contender Series 44	19 October 2021	3	5:00	Las Vegas, Nevada, United States	
Win	8–2 (1)	Karen Thalita	TKO (punches)	Shooto Brasil: Solidariedade	26 July 2020	2	2:12	Rio de Janeiro, Brazil	Return to Strawweight.
Win	7–2 (1)	Maria Ribeiro	TKO (punches)	Future FC 6	28 June 2019	3	4:03	São Paulo, Brazil	
Win	6–2 (1)	Janaina Soares	TKO (punches)	Watch Out Combat Show 54	18 May 2019	1	1:00	Rio de Janeiro, Brazil	Catchweight (110 lb) bout.
Win	5–2 (1)	Lohayne Lopes	TKO (punches)	Warriors Mix Challenger 1	30 March 2019	2	2:37	Rio de Janeiro, Brazil	
Win	4–2 (1)	Monique Adriane	Decision (split)	Shooto Brasil 88	28 September 2018	3	5:00	Rio de Janeiro, Brazil	Atomweight debut.
Win	3–2 (1)	Julia Polastri	Decision (unanimous)	Shooto Brasil 84	26 May 2018	3	5:00	Rio de Janeiro, Brazil	
Loss	2–2 (1)	Marcela Giantomassi Aguiar	Decision (split)	Shooto Brasil 78	26 November 2017	3	5:00	Rio de Janeiro, Brazil	
Loss	2–1 (1)	Maria Oliveira	Decision (split)	Angels & Fight Contest 1	10 June 2017	3	5:00	Rio de Janeiro, Brazil	For the inaugural BFS Women's Strawweight Championship.
Win	2–0 (1)	Elaine Leal	Decision (split)	Champions Fight 5	8 October 2016	3	5:00	Belo Horizonte, Brazil	Won the vacant TF Team Women's Strawweight Championship.
Win	1–0 (1)	Cleudilene Costa	Decision (split)	Fury Fight 1	7 May 2016	3	5:00	Rio de Janeiro, Brazil	
NC	0–0 (1)	Nayara Hemily	NC (missed weight)	New Corpore Extreme 4	30 January 2016	3	5:00	Rio de Janeiro, Brazil	Strawweight debut; Machado missed weight (116 lb).

== Mixed martial arts exhibition record ==
Exhibition record breakdown		
2 matches	2 wins	0 losses
By knockout	1	0
By decision	1	0

Res.	Record	Opponent	Method	Event	Date	Round	Time	Location	Notes
Win	2–0	Delphine Benouaich	Decision (unanimous)	The Ultimate Fighter: Team Cormier vs. Team Bisping	12 May 2026	3	5:00	Las Vegas, Nevada, United States	The Ultimate Fighter 34 Semi-final round.
Win	1–0	Natalia Alves	TKO (punches)	The Ultimate Fighter: Team Cormier vs. Team Bisping	27 April 2026	2	4:08	Las Vegas, Nevada, United States	The Ultimate Fighter 34 Quarterfinal round.

== See also ==
- List of current UFC fighters
- List of Dana White's Contender Series alumni
- List of female mixed martial artists
