= 2010 in DREAM =

Mixed martial arts events

Information
- First date: March 22, 2010
- Last date: December 31, 2010

Events
- Total events: 5

Fights
- Total fights: 43
- Title fights: 4

Chronology
| 2009 in DREAM | 2010 in DREAM | 2011 in DREAM |

The year 2010 was the 3rd year in the history of DREAM, a mixed martial arts promotion based in Japan. In 2010 DREAM held 5 events beginning with, Dream 13.

== Title fights ==
Title fights in 2010
| Weight class | | | | Method | Round | Time | Event | Notes |
|---|---|---|---|---|---|---|---|---|
| Featherweight | Bibiano Fernandes (c) | def. | Joachim Hansen | Decision (Split) | 2 | 5:00 | Dream 13 | (Note: For the Dream Featherweight Championship.) |
| Light Heavyweight | Gegard Mousasi | def. | Tatsuya Mizuno | Submission (Rear-Naked Choke) | 1 | 6:10 | Dream 16 | (Note: For the Light Heavyweight Championship.) |
| Featherweight | Hiroyuki Takaya | def. | Bibiano Fernandes (c) | Decision (Unanimous) | 3 | 5:00 | Dynamite!! 2010 | (Note: For the Dream Featherweight Championship.) |
| Heavyweight | Alistair Overeem | def. | Todd Duffee | KO (Punches) | 1 | 0:19 | Dynamite!! 2010 | (Note: For the Dream Heavyweight Championship.) |

== Events list ==
| # | Event Title | Date | Arena | Location | Attendees | Broadcast |
|---|---|---|---|---|---|---|
| 19 | Dynamite!! 2010 | December 31, 2010 | Saitama Super Arena | Saitama, Saitama, Japan | 26,729 | Tokyo Broadcasting System; HDNet |
| 18 | Dream 16 | September 25, 2010 | Nippon Gaishi Hall | Nagoya, Aichi, Japan | 9,304 | Tokyo Broadcasting System; HDNet |
| 17 | Dream 15 | Jul 10, 2010 | Saitama Super Arena | Saitama, Saitama, Japan | 13,028 | Tokyo Broadcasting System; HDNet |
| 16 | Dream 14 | May 29, 2010 | Saitama Super Arena | Saitama, Saitama, Japan | 12,712 | Tokyo Broadcasting System; HDNet |
| 15 | Dream 13 | March 22, 2010 | Yokohama Arena | Yokohama, Kanagawa, Japan | 13,712 | Tokyo Broadcasting System; HDNet |

== Dream 13 ==
Dream 13 was an event held on March 22, 2010 at the Yokohama Arena in Yokohama, Kanagawa, Japan.

=== Results ===
Main Card
| Weight class | | | | Method | Round | Time | Notes |
|---|---|---|---|---|---|---|---|
| Featherweight | Bibiano Fernandes (c) | def. | Joachim Hansen | Decision (Split) | 2 | 5:00 | (Note: For the Dream Featherweight Championship.) |
| Heavyweight | Josh Barnett | def. | Siala-Mou Siliga | Submission (Kimura) | 1 | 4:41 |
| Catchweight (72 kg) | K. J. Noons | def. | André Amado | Decision (Unanimous) | 2 | 5:00 |
| Welterweight | Ryo Chonan | def. | Andrews Nakahara | Decision (Unanimous) | 2 | 5:00 |
| Featherweight | Cole Escovedo | def. | Yoshiro Maeda | KO (Head Kick) | 1 | 2:29 |
| Lightweight | Katsunori Kikuno | def. | Kuniyoshi Hironaka | KO (Punch) | 1 | 1:26 |
| Openweight | Ikuhisa Minowa | def. | Jimmy Ambriz | Submission (Toe Hold) | 2 | 2:42 |

== Dream 14 ==
Dream 14 was an event held on May 29, 2010 at the Saitama Super Arena in Saitama, Saitama, Japan.

=== Results ===
Main Card
| Weight class | | | | Method | Round | Time | Notes |
|---|---|---|---|---|---|---|---|
| Welterweight | Nick Diaz | def. | Hayato Sakurai | Submission (Armbar) | 1 | 3:54 |
| Middleweight | Ralek Gracie | def. | Kazushi Sakuraba | Decision (Unanimous) | 3 | 5:00 |
| Featherweight | Hiroyuki Takaya | def. | Joachim Hansen | KO (Punches) | 1 | 4:27 |
| Featherweight | Norifumi Yamamoto | def. | Federico Lopez | KO (Punches) | 1 | 1:41 |
| Featherweight | Akiyo Nishiura | def. | Hideo Tokoro | TKO (Punches) | 1 | 2:51 |
| Featherweight | Kazuyuki Miyata | def. | Takafumi Otsuka | Decision (Split) | 3 | 5:00 |
| Featherweight | Kenji Osawa | def. | Yoshiro Maeda | Decision (Split) | 3 | 5:00 |
| Openweight | Ikuhisa Minowa | def. | Imani Lee | Submission (Rear-Naked Choke) | 1 | 4:16 |

== Dream 15 ==
Dream 15 was an event held on July 10, 2010 at the Saitama Super Arena in Saitama, Saitama, Japan.

=== Results ===
Main Card
| Weight class | | | | Method | Round | Time | Notes |
|---|---|---|---|---|---|---|---|
| Lightweight | Shinya Aoki | def. | Tatsuya Kawajiri | Submission (Achilles Lock) | 1 | 1:53 |
| Lightweight | Gesias Cavalcante | def. | Katsunori Kikuno | Decision (Split) | 2 | 5:00 |
| Light Heavyweight | Gegard Mousasi | def. | Jake O'Brien | Submission (Guillotine Choke) | 1 | 0:31 |
| Light Heavyweight | Tatsuya Mizuno | def. | Melvin Manhoef | Submission (Kimura) | 1 | 7:38 |
| Featherweight | Michihiro Omigawa | def. | Young Sam Jung | Submission (Guillotine Choke) | 1 | 7:31 |
| Featherweight | Mitsuhiro Ishida | def. | Daiki Hata | Decision (Unanimous) | 2 | 5:00 |
| Middleweight | Kazuhiro Nakamura | def. | Karl Amoussou | Decision (Unanimous) | 2 | 5:00 |

== Dream 16 ==
Dream 16 was an event held on September 25, 2010 at the Nippon Gaishi Hall in Nagoya, Aichi, Japan.

=== Results ===
Main Card
| Weight class | | | | Method | Round | Time | Notes |
|---|---|---|---|---|---|---|---|
| Light Heavyweight | Gegard Mousasi | def. | Tatsuya Mizuno | Submission (Rear-Naked Choke) | 1 | 6:10 | (Note: For the Light Heavyweight Championship.) |
| Middleweight | Jason Miller | def. | Kazushi Sakuraba | Submission (Arm-Triangle Choke) | 1 | 2:09 |
| Lightweight | Shinya Aoki | def. | Marcus Aurelio | Decision (Unanimous) | 2 | 5:00 |
| Openweight | Satoshi Ishii | def. | Ikuhisa Minowa | Decision (Unanimous) | 2 | 5:00 |
| Featherweight | Hiroyuki Takaya | def. | Chase Beebe | KO (Punches) | 1 | 1:45 |
| Featherweight | Michihiro Omigawa | def. | Cole Escovedo | Submission (Inverted Armbar) | 1 | 2:30 |
| Featherweight | Joachim Hansen | def. | Hideo Tokoro | Submission (Triangle Choke) | 1 | 2:48 |
| Featherweight | Kazuyuki Miyata | def. | Takeshi Inoue | Decision (Unanimous) | 2 | 5:00 |
| Featherweight | Mitsuhiro Ishida | def. | Akiyo Nishiura | Decision (Split) | 2 | 5:00 |
| Heavyweight | Yusuke Kawaguchi | def. | James Thompson | Decision (Split) | 2 | 5:00 |

== Dynamite!! 2010 ==
Dynamite!! 2010 was an event held on December 31, 2010 at the Saitama Super Arena in Saitama, Saitama, Japan.

=== Results ===
DREAM Rules
| Weight class | | | | Method | Round | Time | Notes |
|---|---|---|---|---|---|---|---|
| Featherweight | Hiroyuki Takaya | def. | Bibiano Fernandes (c) | Decision (Unanimous) | 3 | 5:00 | (Note: For the Dream Featherweight Championship.) |
| Lightweight | Tatsuya Kawajiri | def. | Josh Thomson | Decision (Unanimous) | 3 | 5:00 |
| Welterweight | Jason High | def. | Hayato Sakurai | Decision (Split) | 3 | 5:00 |
| Welterweight | Marius Zaromskis | def. | Kazushi Sakuraba | TKO (Doctor Stoppage) | 1 | 2:16 |
| Heavyweight | Satoshi Ishii | def. | Jerome Le Banner | Decision (Unanimous) | 3 | 5:00 |
| Heavyweight | Alistair Overeem | def. | Todd Duffee | KO (Punches) | 1 | 0:19 | (Note: For the Dream Heavyweight Championship.) |
| Heavyweight | Sergei Kharitonov | def. | Tatsuya Mizuno | KO (Knee) | 1 | 1:25 |
| Openweight | Hiroshi Izumi | def. | Ikuhisa Minowa | TKO (Punches) | 3 | 2:50 |
| Featherweight | Hideo Tokoro | def. | Kazuhisa Watanabe | Submission (Armbar) | 3 | 2:50 |
| Featherweight | Kazuyuki Miyata | def. | Caol Uno | Decision (Unanimous) | 3 | 5:00 |
| Welterweight | Andy Ologun | def. | Katsuaki Furuki | Decision (Unanimous) | 3 | 5:00 |
DREAM/K-1 Special Rules
| | Yuichiro Nagashima | def. | Shinya Aoki | KO (flying knee and punches) | 2 | 0:04 |
K-1 Rules
| | Akiyo Nishiura | vs. | Tetsuya Yamato | Majority Draw (30-30, 30-30, 29-30) | 3 | 5:00 |
| | Gegard Mousasi | def. | Kyotaro | Decision (30-28, 29-28, 29-28) | 3 | 5:00 |

== See also ==
- DREAM
