= Dream 13 =

Mixed martial arts event in 2010

- The poster for Dream 13
- Promotion: Dream
- Date: March 22, 2010
- Venue: Yokohama Arena
- City: Yokohama, Japan
- Attendance: 13,712

Event chronology
Dream 12	Dream 13	Dream 14

Dream 13 was a mixed martial arts event held by Fighting and Entertainment Group's mixed martial arts promotion Dream. The event took place on Monday, March 22, 2010 at the Yokohama Arena in Yokohama, Japan. The event aired live in North America on HDNet.

== Background ==
This event marked the beginning of co-promotion between DREAM and US organization Strikeforce. The event would also mark the return of K. J. Noons to Mixed Martial Arts in his first fight since 2008.

While not officially announced, Tim Sylvia was planning on participating in this event. However, Dream officials allegedly tried to change his opponent roughly two weeks before the bout was planned to take place.

Marius Žaromskis was in discussions to defend his Dream Welterweight Championship against Kiyoshi Tamura at this event, but would instead appear at Dream 15 on May 30, 2010.

== Results ==
Main Card
Weight class				Method	Round	Time	Notes
Featherweight	Bibiano Fernandes (c)	def.	Joachim Hansen	Decision (Split)	2	5:00	(Note: For the Dream Featherweight Championship.)
Heavyweight	Josh Barnett	def.	Siala-Mou Siliga	Submission (Kimura)	1	4:41
Catchweight (72 kg)	K. J. Noons	def.	André Amado	Decision (Unanimous)	2	5:00
Welterweight	Ryo Chonan	def.	Andrews Nakahara	Decision (Unanimous)	2	5:00
Featherweight	Cole Escovedo	def.	Yoshiro Maeda	KO (Head Kick)	1	2:29
Lightweight	Katsunori Kikuno	def.	Kuniyoshi Hironaka	KO (Punch)	1	1:26
Openweight	Ikuhisa Minowa	def.	Jimmy Ambriz	Submission (Toe Hold)	2	2:42

== Notes ==
KJ Noons and Andre Amade both weighed in at more than the 70 kg Lightweight limit and agreed to fight at 72 kg.

== See also ==
- Dream (mixed martial arts)
- List of Dream champions
- 2010 in DREAM
