= Dream 14 =

Mixed martial arts event in 2010

Dream 14: Diaz vs. Sakurai
- The poster for Dream 14: Diaz vs. Sakurai
- Promotion: Dream
- Date: May 29, 2010
- Venue: Saitama Super Arena
- City: Saitama, Japan
- Attendance: 12,712

Event chronology
Dream 13	Dream 14: Diaz vs. Sakurai	Dream 15

Dream 14 was a mixed martial arts event held by Fighting and Entertainment Group's mixed martial arts promotion Dream. The event took place on May 29, 2010 in Japan. The event aired live in North America on HDNet.

== Background ==
This event was originally expected to be held in Seoul, South Korea on April 24, 2010. However, many factors, including the issue that many top Korean stars such as Denis Kang and Hong Man Choi were not available in April, contributed to the Korea event being cancelled.

This was the second Dream event to take place in a cage.

== Results ==
Main card
Weight class				Method	Round	Time	Notes
Openweight	Ikuhisa Minowa	def	Imani Lee	submission (rear naked choke)	1	4:16
Featherweight	Kenji Osawa	def	Yoshiro Maeda	split decision	3	5:00
Featherweight	Kazuyuki Miyata	def	Takafumi Otsuka	split decision	3	5:00
Featherweight	Akiyo Nishiura	def	Hideo Tokoro	TKO (punches)	1	2:51
Featherweight	Norifumi Yamamoto	def	Federico Lopez	KO (punches)	1	1:41
Featherweight	Hiroyuki Takaya	def	Joachim Hansen	KO (punches)	1	4:27
Middleweight	Ralek Gracie	def	Kazushi Sakuraba	unanimous decision	3	5:00
Welterweight	Nick Diaz	def	Hayato Sakurai	submission (armbar)	1	3:54

== See also ==
- Dream (mixed martial arts)
- List of Dream champions
- 2010 in DREAM
