= 2011 in DREAM =

Mixed martial arts events

Information
- First date: May 29, 2011
- Last date: December 31, 2011

Events
- Total events: 4

Fights
- Total fights: 47
- Title fights: 5

Chronology
2010 in DREAM	2011 in DREAM	2012 in DREAM

The year 2011 was the 4th year in the history of DREAM, a mixed martial arts promotion based in Japan. In 2011 DREAM held 4 events beginning with, Dream: Fight for Japan!.

== Title fights ==
Title fights in 2011
Weight class				Method	Round	Time	Event	Notes
Light Heavyweight	Gegard Mousasi (c)	def.	Hiroshi Izumi	TKO (punches)	1	3:28	Dream: Japan GP Final	(Note: For the Light Heavyweight Championship.)
Featherweight	Hiroyuki Takaya (c)	def.	Kazuyuki Miyata	split decision	3	5:00	Dream: Japan GP Final	(Note: For the Featherweight Championship.)
Lightweight	Shinya Aoki (c)	def.	Satoru Kitaoka	Decision (Unanimous)	5	5:00	Fight For Japan: Genki Desu Ka Omisoko 2011	(Note: For the Lightweight Championship.)
Featherweight	Hiroyuki Takaya (c)	def.	Takeshi Inoue	Decision (Unanimous)	5	5:00	Fight For Japan: Genki Desu Ka Omisoko 2011	(Note: For the Featherweight Championship.)
Bantamweight	Bibiano Fernandes (c)	def.	Antonio Banuelos	TKO (Punches)	1	1:21	Fight For Japan: Genki Desu Ka Omisoko 2011	(Note: For the Bantamweight Championship.)

== Events list ==
#	Event title	Date	Arena	Location	Attendees	Broadcast
23	Fight For Japan: Genki Desu Ka Omisoko 2011	December 31, 2011	Saitama Super Arena	Saitama, Saitama, Japan	24,606	Tokyo Broadcasting System; HDNet
22	Dream 17	September 24, 2011	Saitama Super Arena	Saitama, Saitama, Japan	9,270	HDNet
21	Dream: Japan GP Final	July 16, 2011	Ariake Coliseum	Tokyo, Japan	8,142	HDNet
20	Dream: Fight for Japan!	May 29, 2011	Saitama Super Arena	Saitama, Saitama, Japan	6,522	HDNet

== Dream: Fight for Japan! ==
Dream: Fight for Japan! was an event held on May 29, 2011, at the Saitama Super Arena in Saitama, Saitama, Japan.

=== Results ===
Main Card
Weight class				Method	Round	Time	Notes
	Masakazu Imanari	def.	Kenji Osawa	Submission (Achilles Lock)	2	0:58
	Hideo Tokoro	def.	Atsushi Yamamoto	Decision (Split)	2	5:00
	Shinya Aoki	def.	Rich Clementi	Submission (Neck Crank)	2	2:17
	Katsunori Kikuno	def.	Daisuke Nakamura	Decision (Unanimous)	2	5:00
	Caol Uno	def.	Akiyo Nishiura	Decision (Unanimous)	2	5:00
	Takeshi Inoue	def.	Koichiro Matsumoto	TKO (Punches)	1	6:51
	Joachim Hansen	def.	Mitsuhiro Ishida	Decision (Split)	2	5:00
	Kenji Osawa	def.	Takafumi Otsuka	Decision (Split)	2	5:00
	Masakazu Imanari	def.	Keisuke Fujiwara	Decision (Unanimous)	2	5:00
	Hideo Tokoro	def.	Yoshiro Maeda	TKO (Corner Stoppage)	2	0:43
	Atsushi Yamamoto	def.	Yusaku Nakamura	TKO (Punches)	1	8:43

== Dream: Japan GP Final ==
Dream: Japan GP Final was an event held on July 16, 2011, at the Ariake Coliseum in Tokyo, Japan.

=== Results ===
Main card
Weight class				Method	Round	Time	Notes
Lightweight	Eiji Mitsuoka	def	Bruno Carvalho	unanimous decision	3	5:00
Catchweight (175 lbs)	Marius Žaromskis	def	Eiji Ishikawa	unanimous decision	3	5:00
Light Heavyweight	Tatsuya Mizuno	def	Trevor Prangley	TKO (knee and punches)	1	4:41
Bantamweight	Kenji Osawa	def	Keisuke Fujiwara	unanimous decision	3	5:00
Lightweight	Tatsuya Kawajiri	def	Drew Fickett	TKO (punches)	1	4:41
Light Heavyweight	Gegard Mousasi (c)	def	Hiroshi Izumi	TKO (punches)	1	3:28	(Note: For the Light Heavyweight Championship.)
Bantamweight Tournament Final	Hideo Tokoro	def	Masakazu Imanari	unanimous decision	3	5:00
Featherweight	Hiroyuki Takaya (c)	def.	Kazuyuki Miyata	split decision	3	5:00	(Note: For the Featherweight Championship.)

== Dream 17 ==
Dream 17 was an event held on September 24, 2011, at the Saitama Super Arena in Saitama, Saitama, Japan.

=== Results ===
Main card
Weight class				Method	Round	Time	Notes
Open-weight	Ikuhisa Minowa	def	Baru Harn	submission (scarf hold arm-lock and neck crank)	1	4:39
Bantamweight Tournament Quarterfinal	Rodolfo Marques	def	Yusup Saadulaev	unanimous decision	3	5:00
Bantamweight Tournament Quarterfinal	Masakazu Imanari	def	Abel Cullum	submission (armbar)	3	0:46
Bantamweight Tournament Quarterfinal	Bibiano Fernandes	def	Takafumi Otsuka	technical submission (rear naked choke)	1	0:41
Bantamweight Tournament Quarterfinal	Antonio Banuelos	def	Hideo Tokoro	split decision	3	5:00
Middleweight	Gerald Harris	def	Kazuhiro Nakamura	split decision	3	5:00
Lightweight	Satoru Kitaoka	def	Willamy Freire	split decision	3	5:00
Welterweight	Yan Cabral	def	Kazushi Sakuraba	submission (arm triangle choke)	2	2:42
Featherweight	Takeshi Inoue	def	Caol Uno	KO (head kick)	1	4:17
Featherweight	Tatsuya Kawajiri	def	Joachim Hansen	submission (arm triangle choke)	3	2:30
Lightweight	Shinya Aoki	def	Rob McCullough	submission (neck crank)	1	4:57

== Fight For Japan: Genki Desu Ka Omisoko 2011 ==
Fight For Japan: Genki Desu Ka Omisoko 2011 was an event held on December 31, 2011, at the Saitama Super Arena in Saitama, Saitama, Japan.

=== Results ===
Main Card - MMA Rules
Weight class				Method	Round	Time	Notes
Heavyweight	Fedor Emelianenko	def.	Satoshi Ishii	KO (Punches)	1	2:29
Lightweight	Shinya Aoki (c)	def.	Satoru Kitaoka	Decision (Unanimous)	5	5:00	(Note: For the Light Heavyweight Championship.)
Featherweight	Hiroyuki Takaya (c)	def.	Takeshi Inoue	Decision (Unanimous)	5	5:00	(Note: For the Featherweight Championship.)
IGF Rules
	Kazushi Sakuraba and Katsuyori Shibata	def.	Atsushi Sawada and Shinichi Suzukawa	TKO (referee stoppage)	1	13:46
	Kazuyuki Fujita	def.	Peter Aerts	submission (Boston crab)	1	3:36
	Jerome Le Banner	def.	Tim Sylvia	TKO (referee stoppage)	1	2:57
DREAM/K-1 Special Rules
	Katsunori Kikuno	def.	Yuichiro Nagashima	TKO (punches)	2	2:34
IGF Rules
	Josh Barnett	def.	Hideki Suzuki	pinfall	1	11:47
MMA Rules
Women's (115 lbs)	Megumi Fujii	def.	Karla Benitez	Submission (Armbar)	1	1:15
Featherweight	Tatsuya Kawajiri	def.	Kazuyuki Miyata	Submission (Arm-Triangle Choke)	2	4:54
Welterweight	Hayato Sakurai	def.	Ryo Chonan	Decision (Unanimous)	3	5:00
K-1 MAX Rules
-63 kg	Yuta Kubo	def.	Nils Widlund	KO (High Kick)	3	1:10
-63 kg	Masaaki Noiri	def.	Kengo Sonoda	unanimous decision	3	5:00
Bantamweight Tournament
Bantamweight	Bibiano Fernandes (c)	def.	Antonio Banuelos	TKO (Punches)	1	1:21	(Note: For the Bantamweight Championship.)
Bantamweight	Bibiano Fernandes	def.	Rodolfo Marques Diniz	Decision (Unanimous)	2	5:00
Bantamweight	Antonio Banuelos	def.	Masakazu Imanari	Decision (Split)	2	5:00
Bantamweight	Yusup Saadulaev	def.	Hideo Tokoro	KO (Slam)	1	0:42
