= Dream 16 =

Mixed martial arts event in 2010

- The poster for Dream 16
- Promotion: Dream
- Date: September 25, 2010
- Venue: Nippon Gaishi Hall
- City: Nagoya, Japan
- Attendance: 9,304

Event chronology
| Dream 15 | Dream 16 | Fight For Japan: Genki Desu Ka Omisoka 2011 |

Dream 16 was a mixed martial arts event held by Fighting and Entertainment Group's mixed martial arts promotion Dream. The event took place on September 25, 2010, in Nagoya, Japan. The event aired live in North America on HDNet.

== Background ==
This event served as the final for Dream's Light Heavyweight Grand Prix and crowned the first Dream Light Heavyweight Champion. Gegard Mousasi and Tatsuya Mizuno who won their opening round bouts at Dream 15 fought for the title.

A previously announced featherweight bout with Joe Warren fighting Michihiro Omigawa has been scrapped from this card.

Ikuhisa Minowa was previously reported to be fighting James Thompson, but instead fought Judo Olympic Gold Medalist Satoshi Ishii. Thompson's last minute opponent ending up being Deep Megaton Champion Yusuke Kawaguchi.

== Results ==
Main card
| Weight class | | | | Method | Round | Time | Notes |
|---|---|---|---|---|---|---|---|
| Light Heavyweight | Gegard Mousasi | def | Tatsuya Mizuno | submission (rear naked choke) | 1 | 6:10 | (Note: For the Light Heavyweight Championship.) |
| Middleweight | Jason Miller | def | Kazushi Sakuraba | submission (arm-triangle choke) | 1 | 2:09 |
| Lightweight | Shinya Aoki | def | Marcus Aurélio | unanimous decision | 2 | 5:00 |
| Openweight | Satoshi Ishii | def | Ikuhisa Minowa | unanimous decision | 2 | 5:00 |
| Featherweight | Hiroyuki Takaya | def | Chase Beebe | KO | 1 | 1:45 |
| Featherweight | Michihiro Omigawa | def | Cole Escovedo | submission (straight armbar) | 1 | 2:30 |
| Featherweight | Joachim Hansen | def | Hideo Tokoro | submission (triangle choke) | 1 | 2:48 |
| Featherweight | Kazuyuki Miyata | def | Takeshi Inoue | unanimous decision | 2 | 5:00 |
| Featherweight | Mitsuhiro Ishida | def | Akiyo Nishiura | split decision | 2 | 5:00 |
| Heavyweight | Yusuke Kawaguchi | def | James Thompson | split decision | 2 | 5:00 |

== 2010 Light Heavyweight Grand Prix Bracket ==
Semi-finals
Gegard Mousasi | SUB
Jake O'Brien | 1
Melvin Manhoef | 1
Tatsuya Mizuno | SUB

Final
Gegard Mousasi | SUB
Tatsuya Mizuno | 1

== See also ==
- Dream (mixed martial arts)
- List of Dream champions
- 2010 in DREAM
