= Dream 12 =

Mixed martial arts event in 2009

Dream 12: Cage of Dreams
- The poster for Dream 12: Cage of Dreams
- Promotion: Dream
- Date: October 25, 2009
- Venue: Osaka-jo Hall
- City: Osaka, Japan
- Attendance: 10,112

Event chronology
Dream 11	Dream 12: Cage of Dreams	Dream 13

Dream 12 was a mixed martial arts event promoted by Fighting and Entertainment Group's mixed martial arts promotion Dream that took place on October 25, 2009 in Osaka, Japan. The event marked the first time Dream used a hexagon cage. Fights consisted of three five-minute rounds, as used in the North American system, though elbows remained illegal.

== Results ==
Main card
Weight class				Method	Round	Time	Notes
Heavyweight	Alistair Overeem	def.	James Thompson	Submission (guillotine choke)	1	0:33
Lightweight	Eddie Alvarez	def.	Katsunori Kikuno	Submission (arm-triangle choke)	2	3:42
Welterweight	Marius Zaromskis	def.	Myeon Ho Bae	KO (head kick)	1	0:19
Middleweight	Kazushi Sakuraba	def.	Zelg Galesic	Submission (kneebar)	1	1:40
Middleweight	Katsuyori Shibata	def.	Tokimitsu Ishizawa	TKO (punches)	1	4:52
Middleweight	Dong Sik Yoon	def.	Tarec Saffiedine	Decision (split)	3	5:00
Featherweight	Yoshiro Maeda	def.	Chase Beebe	Submission (rear-naked choke)	1	3:36
Lightweight	Kuniyoshi Hironaka	def.	Won Sik Park	TKO (eye injury)	1	5:00
Featherweight	Tomoya Miyashita	def.	Keisuke Fujiwara	Decision (unanimous)	3	5:00

== See also ==
- Dream (mixed martial arts)
- List of Dream champions
- 2009 in DREAM

== Notes ==
- On August 12, 2009, it was announced the event would take place October 25 at the Osaka Castle Hall in Osaka, Japan. Dream's EP Sasahara hinted at a "big surprise" which he said had a 70% chance of actually happening. This "big surprise" turn out to be the introduction of a cage as Dream's fighting platform.
- Prior to Dream 12, Dream utilized their official YouTube channel to provide hype for the event. On August 21, 2009, a brief promotional video teasing viewers with the first appearance of a cage was uploaded. A month later, on September 23, 2009, another Dream 12 promotional video was uploaded, this time depicting potential participants intertwined with footage showing the construction of Dream's white cage. The show, Event Producer Seiichi Sasahara said Sakuraba could potentially fight again later in the month, though no official decision has yet to be made. A week out from the event, Sakuraba was confirmed for Dream 12.
- The Ultimate Fighter 9 competitor Richie Whitson was set to face Daisuke Nakamura however scheduling issues forced Whitson out of the bout.
- A bout between Melvin Manhoef and Zelg Galesic was scrapped after Manhoef had to pull out due to injury. Manhoef was replaced by Kazushi Sakuraba.
- A bout between Paulo Filho and Dong Sik Yoon was scrapped after Filho failed to show up. Tarec Saffiedine replaced Filho.
