= Dream 10 =

Mixed martial arts event in 2009

Dream.10: Welter Weight Grand Prix 2009 Final Round
- The poster for Dream.10: Welter Weight Grand Prix 2009 Final Round
- Promotion: Dream
- Date: July 20, 2009
- Venue: Saitama Super Arena
- City: Saitama, Japan
- Attendance: 11,970

Event chronology
Dream.9: Feather Weight Grand Prix 2009 Second Round	Dream.10: Welter Weight Grand Prix 2009 Final Round	Dream.11: Feather Weight Grand Prix 2009 Final Round

Dream.10: Welter Weight Grand Prix 2009 Final Round was a mixed martial arts event promoted by Fighting and Entertainment Group's mixed martial arts promotion Dream on July 20, 2009. Dream's welterweight division has a 76 kilograms (168 lb) weight limit. The event was broadcast live in North America on HDNet.

== Results ==
Welterweight Grand Prix 2009 final
Weight class				Method	Round	Time	Notes
Welterweight	Marius Zaromskis	def.	Jason High	KO (Head Kick)	1	2:22	(Note: For the Dream Welterweight Championship.)
Main Card
Lightweight	Shinya Aoki	def.	Vítor Ribeiro	Decision (Unanimous)	2	5:00
Middleweight	Jesse Taylor	def.	Dong Sik Yoon	Submission (Foot Injury)	1	1:02
Middleweight	Paulo Filho	def.	Melvin Manhoef	Submission (Armbar)	1	2:36
Lightweight	Katsunori Kikuno	def.	Andre Amado	TKO (Punches)	1	3:47
Welterweight Grand Prix 2009 semi-final
Welterweight	Marius Zaromskis	def.	Hayato Sakurai	TKO (Head Kick and Punches)	1	4:03
Welterweight	Jason High	def.	Andre Galvao	Decision (Split)	2	5:00
Welterweight Grand Prix reserve bout
Welterweight	Tarec Saffiedine	def.	Seichi Ikemoto	Decision (Unanimous)	2	5:00

== See also ==
- Dream (mixed martial arts)
- List of Dream champions
- 2009 in DREAM

== Notes ==
- An early report suggested that Joachim Hansen would defend his DREAM Light Weight Championship against Shinya Aoki at DREAM.10.
- Three undercard bouts were announced for DREAM.10 during the intermission of DREAM.9. These bouts included Shinya Aoki versus Vítor Ribeiro, Melvin Manhoef versus Paulo Filho, and Katsunori Kikuno versus Andre Amade. Following a short promotional video, Shinya Aoki, Katsunori Kikuno, and Hayato Sakurai each entered the ring, and gave brief addresses to the audience.
- After fulfilling a one-fight contract with Zuffa, LLC at UFC 99, Mirko Filipović was rumored to have re-signed with FEG for participation at DREAM.10. Siala-Mou "Mighty Mo" Siligia was rumored to be Filipovic's opponent on the card. However, the bout was scrapped after Zuffa Chairman Lorenzo Fertitta flew to Zagreb, Croatia to reopen contract negotiations with Filipovic.

== Welterweight Grand Prix 2009 Bracket ==
First round
(Japan)	Seiichi Ikemoto
(Lithuania)	Marius Zaromskis	W Dec
(Japan)	Hayato Sakurai	W TKO
(Japan)	Shinya Aoki
(Japan)	Yuya Shirai
(United States)	Jason High	W Sub
(Canada)	John Alessio
(Brazil)	Andre Galvao	W Sub

Semifinals
(Lithuania)	Marius Zaromskis	W TKO
(Japan)	Hayato Sakurai
(United States)	Jason High	W Dec
(Brazil)	Andre Galvao

Final
(Lithuania)	Marius Zaromskis	W KO
(United States)	Jason High

Dream Welterweight Grand Prix Reserve Bouts:

(Belgium) Tarec Saffiedine def. (Japan) Seichi Ikemoto at DREAM.10
