= Yoshiro Maeda =

Japanese mixed martial artist (born 1981)

- Born: October 31, 1981 (age 44); Takamatsu, Kagawa, Japan
- Native name: 前田 吉朗
- Other names: Hitman from Naniwa
- Nationality: Japanese
- Height: 5 ft 7 in (1.70 m)
- Weight: 125 lb (57 kg; 8.9 st)
- Division: Bantamweight; Flyweight (2014–present)
- Style: MMA, Hybrid martial arts
- Fighting out of: Osaka, Japan
- Team: Pancrase Inagakigumi
- Years active: 2002–present

Mixed martial arts record
- Total: 62
- Wins: 40
- By knockout: 15
- By submission: 9
- By decision: 15
- By disqualification: 1
- Losses: 19
- By knockout: 9
- By submission: 6
- By decision: 4
- Draws: 3

Other information
- Mixed martial arts record from Sherdog

Yoshiro Maeda (Japanese: 前田吉朗, Maeda Yoshirō; born October 31, 1981) is a Japanese mixed martial artist who currently competes in DEEP's flyweight division, and formerly fought in DEEP's bantamweight division, the latter of which he is a former champion, recently losing the title to Daiki Hata who is still the reigning champion. With a professional career spanning 10 years, Maeda has competed in notable Japanese promotions such as Pancrase, PRIDE FC and DREAM, as well as the WEC in America.

== Mixed martial arts career ==
=== Early career ===
Going 0–1–2 as an amateur in 2002, Maeda made his professional debut in 2003 with a second round technical submission of Shigeyuki Umeki. Between his pro debut and 2005, Maeda racked a record of 17–2–1, with wins coming under the Pancrase and DEEP banners.

=== World Extreme Cagefighting ===
Following a drop in weight to the bantamweight division, Maeda debuted in the WEC with a first-round KO due to a kick to the body against King of the Cage champion, Charlie Valencia. With this win, Maeda was given a title shot against bantamweight champion, Miguel Torres. In a back and forth battle, both men landed hard shots on the feet and exchanged submission attempts on the ground. Maeda would lose due to doctor stoppage in the third round due to severe swelling of his right eye. The fight earned Fight of the Night honors.

Maeda would then face BJJ black belt, Rani Yahya, in a catchweight bout of 137 pounds at WEC 36. Maeda lost by submission due to a guillotine choke in the first round. Following this loss, Maeda would be released from his WEC contract after going 1–2 in the promotion.

=== DREAM ===
In his first bout under the DREAM banner, Maeda defeated Micah Miller by unanimous decision. Followed by a controversial first-round KO loss to Hiroyuki Takaya, he rebounded with a win over former WEC champion Chase Beebe. Once again, Maeda would lose by KO, this time to former WEC champion Cole Escovedo. Maeda is 0-4 within DREAM since his loss to Escovedo in 2010.

=== World Victory Road ===
Yoshiro Maeda fought former Sengoku featherweight champion, Masanori Kanehara, in December 2010. Maeda won by first-round TKO.

== Championships and accomplishments ==
=== Mixed martial arts ===
- Deep
  - Deep Bantamweight Championship (one time; former)
  - One successful title defense
  - 2005 Deep Bantamweight Championship Tournament Runner Up
- Pancrase
  - King of Pancrase Featherweight Championship (one time; former)
  - One successful title defense
  - 2006 King of Pancrase Featherweight Championship Tournament Winner
  - 2003 Pancrase Neo Blood Featherweight Tournament Winner
- World Extreme Cagefighting
  - Fight of the Night (One time) vs. Miguel Torres
- Sports Illustrated
  - 2008 Fight of the Year vs. Miguel Torres at WEC 34
- MMA Fighting
  - 2008 #2 Ranked UFC Fight of the Year vs. Miguel Torres at WEC 34

== Mixed martial arts record ==
Professional record breakdown
61 matches	39 wins	19 losses
By knockout	15	9
By submission	8	6
By decision	15	4
By disqualification	1	0
Draws	3	

Res.	Record	Opponent	Method	Event	Date	Round	Time	Location	Notes
Win	40–19–3	Sanou Yokouchi	Submission (rear-naked choke)	Rizin 50	March 29, 2025	3	2:55	Takamatsu, Japan	Catchweight (130 lb) bout.
Win	39–19–3	Mitsuhisa Sunabe	Decision (unanimous)	Rizin 32	November 20, 2021	3	5:00	Okinawa, Japan	Catchweight (129 lb) bout.
Loss	38–19–3	Tatsuro Taira	Technical Submission (rear-naked choke)	Shooto 2021 Vol.2	March 20, 2021	1	1:01	Tokyo, Japan	Bantamweight bout.
Loss	38–18–3	Ryuya Fukuda	TKO (Punches)	Shooto 2020 Vol.4	July 12, 2020	3	4:57	Osaka, Japan	For the interim Shooto Flyweight Championship.
Win	38–17–3	Payoongsak Singchalad	Submission (rear-naked choke)	DEEP & Pancrase: Osaka Tournament 2019	November 17, 2019	1	3:18	Osaka, Japan	
Win	37–17–3	Koki Naito	Decision (split)	Shooto: 30th Anniversary Tour 5th Round	June 30, 2019	3	5:00	Osaka, Japan	
Loss	36–17–3	Kiyotaka Shimizu	TKO (punches)	Shooto 1/27 at Korakuen Hall	January 27, 2019	1	4:37	Tokyo, Japan	
Win	36–16–3	Tadaaki Yamamoto	Decision (unanimous)	Shooto in Osaka 2018	June 17, 2018	3	5:00	Osaka, Japan	
Win	35–16–3	Kim Young-han	KO (punches)	Shooto in Osaka 2017	June 25, 2017	1	0:54	Osaka, Japan	Catchweight (129 lb) bout.
Loss	34–16–3	Hayato Ishii	Decision (unanimous)	Shooto 1/29	January 29, 2017	3	5:00	Tokyo, Japan	
Win	34–15–3	Kosuke Suzuki	Submission (rear-naked choke)	Shooto: Mobstyles Presents Fight & Mosh	April 23, 2016	2	2:43	Urayasu, Japan	
Win	33–15–3	Takaki Soya	Decision (unanimous)	Vale Tudo Japan 7th	September 13, 2015	3	5:00	Urayasu, Japan	
Win	32–15–3	Kentaro Watanabe	Decision (unanimous)	Vale Tudo Japan in Osaka	June 21, 2015	3	5:00	Osaka, Japan	
Win	31–15–3	Haruo Ochi	Decision (majority)	DEEP DREAM Impact 2014: Omisoka Special	December 31, 2014	3	5:00	Saitama, Japan	
Loss	30–15–3	Yuki Motoya	Submission (armbar)	DEEP 67 Impact	June 22, 2014	1	4:59	Tokyo, Japan	
Loss	30–14–3	Ryuichi Miki	Decision (unanimous)	Vale Tudo Japan 4th	February 23, 2014	3	5:00	Tokyo, Japan	
Draw	30–13–3	Mamoru Yamaguchi	Draw (majority)	DEEP: Tribe Tokyo Fight	October 20, 2013	3	5:00	Tokyo, Japan	Flyweight debut.
Loss	30–13–2	Daiki Hata	TKO (punches)	DEEP 62 Impact	April 26, 2013	2	1:41	Tokyo, Japan	Lost the DEEP Bantamweight Championship.
Loss	30–12–2	Bibiano Fernandes	Technical Submission (triangle choke)	Dream 18	December 31, 2012	1	1:46	Tokyo, Japan	Catchweight (138 lb) bout.
Win	30–11–2	Tatsumitsu Wada	Submission (rear-naked choke)	DEEP 59 Impact	August 18, 2012	3	2:32	Tokyo, Japan	Defended the DEEP Bantamweight Championship.
Win	29–11–2	Takafumi Otsuka	Submission (rear-naked choke)	DEEP 57 Impact	February 18, 2012	2	3:13	Tokyo, Japan	Won the DEEP Bantamweight Championship.
Loss	28–11–2	Hiroshi Nakamura	Decision (majority)	DEEP: Cage Impact 2011 in Tokyo, 2nd Round	October 29, 2011	3	5:00	Tokyo, Japan	
Loss	28–10–2	Hideo Tokoro	TKO (corner stoppage)	Dream: Fight for Japan!	May 29, 2011	2	0:23	Saitama, Saitama, Japan	2011 Dream Bantamweight Grand Prix Quarterfinal.
Win	28–9–2	Masanori Kanehara	TKO (punches)	World Victory Road Presents: Soul of Fight	December 30, 2010	1	1:27	Tokyo, Japan	Featherweight bout.
Win	27–9–2	Takafumi Otsuka	Decision (majority)	DEEP 50 Impact	October 24, 2010	3	5:00	Tokyo, Japan	
Loss	26–9–2	Kenji Osawa	Decision (split)	Dream 14	May 29, 2010	3	5:00	Saitama, Saitama, Japan	Return to Bantamweight.
Loss	26–8–2	Cole Escovedo	KO (head kick)	Dream 13	March 22, 2010	1	2:29	Yokohama, Japan	
Win	26–7–2	Chase Beebe	Submission (rear-naked choke)	Dream 12	October 25, 2009	1	3:26	Osaka, Japan	
Win	25–7–2	Kleber Koike Erbst	DQ (knee to groin)	DEEP: Osaka Impact	August 30, 2009	1	4:00	Osaka, Japan	
Loss	24–7–2	Hiroyuki Takaya	TKO (punches)	Dream 9	May 26, 2009	1	9:39	Yokohama, Japan	2009 Dream Featherweight Grand Prix Quarterfinal.
Win	24–6–2	Micah Miller	Decision (unanimous)	Dream 7	Mar 8, 2009	2	5:00	Saitama, Japan	2009 Dream Featherweight Grand Prix Round of 16.
Loss	23–6–2	Rani Yahya	Submission (guillotine choke)	WEC 36	November 5, 2008	1	3:30	Hollywood, Florida, United States	Catchweight (137 lb) bout; Yahya missed weight.
Loss	23–5–2	Miguel Torres	TKO (doctor stoppage)	WEC 34	June 1, 2008	3	5:00	Sacramento, California, United States	For the WEC Bantamweight Championship. Fight of the Night.
Win	23–4–2	Charlie Valencia	KO (kick to the body)	WEC 32	February 13, 2008	1	2:29	Rio Rancho, New Mexico, United States	Bantamweight debut.
Draw	22–4–2	Kim Jong-man	Draw (unanimous)	DEEP: Protect Impact 2007	December 22, 2007	3	5:00	Osaka, Japan	
Win	22–4–1	Johnny Frachey	TKO (kicks and punches)	Pancrase: Rising 6	September 5, 2007	1	3:38	Tokyo, Japan	
Win	21–4–1	Danny Batten	Decision (unanimous)	Pancrase: Rising 4	April 27, 2007	3	5:00	Tokyo, Japan	Defended the Pancrase Featherweight Championship.
Win	20–4–1	Manabu Inoue	TKO (punches)	Pancrase: Rising 1	February 4, 2007	1	4:36	Osaka, Japan	
Loss	19–4–1	Joe Pearson	Submission (guillotine choke)	Pride Bushido 13	November 5, 2006	1	0:54	Yokohama, Japan	
Win	19–3–1	Daiki Hata	Decision (split)	Pancrase: Blow 6	August 27, 2006	3	5:00	Yokohama, Japan	Won the inaugural Pancrase Featherweight Championship.
Win	18–3–1	Atsushi Yamamoto	KO (flying knee)	Pancrase: Blow 5	June 6, 2006	2	4:36	Tokyo, Japan	
Loss	17–3–1	Daiki Hata	TKO (punches)	Pancrase: Blow 2	March 19, 2006	2	0:35	Osaka, Japan	
Loss	17–2–1	Masakazu Imanari	Submission (toe hold)	DEEP 22 Impact	December 2, 2005	3	1:31	Tokyo, Japan	2005 DEEP Featherweight Tournament Final. For the inaugural DEEP Featherweight Championship.
Win	17–1–1	Muangfahlek Kiatwichian	KO (punches and soccer kick)	DEEP 22 Impact	December 2, 2005	1	2:26	Tokyo, Japan	2005 DEEP Featherweight Tournament Semifinal.
Win	16–1–1	Tomomi Iwama	KO (head kick)	DEEP 21 Impact	October 28, 2005	1	0:32	Tokyo, Japan	2005 DEEP Featherweight Tournament Quarterfinal.
Win	15–1–1	Miki Shida	KO (punches)	Pancrase: Spiral 7	September 4, 2005	3	2:17	Osaka, Japan	
Win	14–1–1	Colin Mannsur	TKO (punches)	Pancrase: Spiral 6	July 31, 2005	1	2:43	Tokyo, Japan	
Loss	13–1–1	Charles Bennett	KO (punch)	Pride Bushido 7	May 22, 2005	1	1:55	Osaka, Japan	Lightweight bout.
Win	13–0–1	Takumi Murata	Submission (armbar)	Pancrase: Spiral 3	April 10, 2005	1	4:16	Osaka, Japan	
Draw	12–0–1	Masakazu Imanari	Draw (majority)	DEEP 18 Impact	February 12, 2005	3	5:00	Tokyo, Japan	
Win	12–0	Minoru Tsuiki	KO (punch and head kick)	Pancrase: Brave 12	December 21, 2004	1	4:02	Tokyo, Japan	
Win	11–0	Fredson Paixão	Decision (unanimous)	Pancrase: Brave 7	August 22, 2004	3	5:00	Osaka, Japan	
Win	10–0	Isamu Sugiuchi	KO (punch)	Pancrase: Brave 5	May 28, 2004	1	1:32	Tokyo, Japan	
Win	9–0	Hiroshi Umemura	Submission (armbar)	DEEP 14 Impact	April 18, 2004	1	2:26	Osaka, Japan	Catchweight (139 lb) bout.
Win	8–0	Alexandre Freitas	TKO (flying knee and punches)	Pancrase: Brave 2	February 15, 2004	2	0:25	Osaka, Japan	
Win	7–0	Baret Yoshida	KO (punches)	Pancrase: Hybrid 10	November 30, 2003	1	1:29	Tokyo, Japan	Return to Featherweight.
Win	6–0	Satoshi Watanabe	Decision (unanimous)	Pancrase: Hybrid 8	October 4, 2003	2	5:00	Osaka, Japan	Lightweight debut.
Win	5–0	Miki Shida	Decision (unanimous)	Pancrase: 2003 Neo-Blood Tournament 2	July 27, 2003	2	5:00	Tokyo, Japan	Won the 2003 Pancrase Neo Blood Featherweight Tournament.
Win	4–0	Takahiro Sanehara	TKO (punches)	Pancrase: 2003 Neo Blood Tournament 1	July 27, 2003	2	1:06	Tokyo, Japan	2003 Pancrase Neo Blood Featherweight Tournament Semifinal.
Win	3–0	Shinya Sato	Decision (majority)	Pancrase: Hybrid 7	June 22, 2003	2	5:00	Osaka, Japan	
Win	2–0	Mitsuhisa Sunabe	Decision (unanimous)	Pancrase: Hybrid 5	May 18, 2003	2	5:00	Yokohama, Japan	
Win	1–0	Shigeyuki Umeki	Technical Submission (rear-naked choke)	Pancrase: Hybrid 2	February 16, 2003	2	1:49	Osaka, Japan	Featherweight debut.

=== Mixed martial arts exhibition record ===
Res.	Record	Opponent	Method	Event	Date	Round	Time	Location	Notes
Draw	0–0–2	Yasunori Yamada	Draw (time limit)	Pancrase - Spirit 6	August 25, 2002	2	5:00	Osaka, Japan	
Draw	0–0–1	Mikio Takeuchi	Draw (time limit)	Pancrase - Spirit 4	May 11, 2002	2	5:00	Osaka, Japan	

== See also ==
- List of current mixed martial arts champions
- List of male mixed martial artists
