= Akiyo Nishiura =

Japanese mixed martial artist

Akiyo Nishiura 西浦聡生
- Born: 8 August 1983 (age 43)
- Other names: Wicky Akiyo
- Nationality: Japanese
- Height: 5 ft 8 in (1.73 m)
- Weight: 139 lb (63 kg; 9.9 st)
- Division: Featherweight
- Fighting out of: Kirkland, Washington, United States
- Team: AMC Pankration, STGY

Kickboxing record
- Total: 4
- Wins: 1
- Losses: 2
- Draws: 1

Mixed martial arts record
- Total: 23
- Wins: 14
- By knockout: 5
- By decision: 9
- Losses: 8
- By decision: 8
- Draws: 1

Other information
- Mixed martial arts record from Sherdog

Akiyo Nishiura (西浦"ウィッキー"聡生, Nishiura "Wikkī" Akiyo) (born August 8, 1983) is a Japanese professional mixed martial artist and kickboxer. Nishiura currently competes in MMA for the DREAM organization as a Featherweight and has also fought for Shooto, Cage Force, and DEEP.

== Mixed martial arts career ==
=== DREAM ===
After compiling a record of 9-3-1 in organizations such as Shooto and Cage Force, Nishiura made his promotional debut with DREAM on March 8, 2009 against Abel Cullum at DREAM 7 in the opening round of the Featherweight Grand Prix, where he lost via unanimous decision. He returned at DREAM 14 in May 2010 and was able to cause an upset by defeating Hideo Tokoro via technical knockout within the first round.

In his next fight at DREAM 16, he faced Mitsuhiro Ishida. Ishida worked frequent takedowns almost exclusively in favor of striking for the 15-minute affair, though Nishiura was able to regain his feet quickly each time. In the second frame, Ishida was able to gain mount, but it was Nishiura who drew first blood with a successful sprawl in the final moments that led to a barrage of hammerfists to his opponent's face. It wasn't enough to sway the judges, who awarded Ishida a split decision win.

=== Road to UFC: Japan ===
In June 2015, Nishiura was announced as one of the eight featherweights competing on Road to UFC: Japan, a show in the style of The Ultimate Fighter. On the show he was scheduled to face Hiroto Uesako in the quarterfinals but Uesako had a hand injury. He was replaced by Hiroyuki Oshiro and Nishiura won the fight by TKO in the first round. He then faced Teruto Ishihara in the semifinals and lost by decision.

=== Kickboxing career ===
On December 31, 2010, he made his kickboxing debut on the annual New Year's Eve event Dynamite!! against K-1 veteran Tetsuya Yamato. After three rounds, the bout was scored as a draw.

Nishiura entered the 2013 –65 kg S-Cup held at Shoot Boxing Battle Summit Ground Zero Tokyo 2013 in Tokyo, Japan on November 15, 2013. After defeating Masaya by unanimous decision in the quarter-finals, he then faced fellow mixed martial artist Michihiro Omigawa in the semis. The fight was ruled a majority draw after the regulation three rounds and so went to an extension round to produce a winner, after which Omigawa was given the nod by all three judges.

== Mixed martial arts record ==
Professional record breakdown
23 matches	14 wins	8 losses
By knockout	5	0
By decision	9	8
Draws	1	

Res.	Record	Opponent	Method	Event	Date	Round	Time	Location	Notes
Win	14–8–1	Andy Souwer	Decision (unanimous)	Rizin World Grand Prix 2017: Opening Round - Part 2	October 15, 2017	2	15:00	Fukuoka, Japan	
Win	13–8–1	Ryogo Takahashi	Decision (unanimous)	Shooto: 4th Round 2014	May 5, 2014	3	5:00	Tokyo, Japan	
Win	12–8–1	Shigeki Osawa	Decision (split)	Vale Tudo Japan: VTJ 3rd	October 5, 2013	3	5:00	Tokyo, Japan	
Loss	11–8–1	Yuta Nezo	Decision (unanimous)	Vale Tudo Japan: VTJ 2nd	June 22, 2013	3	5:00	Tokyo, Japan	
Loss	11–7–1	Caol Uno	Decision (unanimous)	Dream: Fight for Japan!	May 29, 2011	2	5:00	Saitama, Japan	
Loss	11–6–1	Mitsuhiro Ishida	Decision (split)	DREAM 16	September 25, 2010	2	5:00	Nagoya, Japan	
Win	11–5–1	Hideo Tokoro	TKO (punches)	DREAM 14	May 29, 2010	1	2:51	Saitama, Japan	
Loss	10–5–1	Gustavo Falciroli	Decision (majority)	Shooto Australia: Superfight Australia 6	July 10, 2009	3	5:00	Joondalup, Australia	
Win	10–4–1	Takumi Ota	Decision (unanimous)	Shooto: Shooto Tradition Final	May 10, 2009	2	5:00	Tokyo, Japan	
Loss	9–4–1	Abel Cullum	Decision (unanimous)	DREAM 7	March 8, 2009	2	5:00	Saitama, Japan	Featherweight Grand Prix Quarterfinal
Loss	9–3–1	Yuji Hoshino	Decision (unanimous)	GCM: Cage Force 9	December 6, 2008	3	5:00	Tokyo, Japan	
Win	9–2–1	Fanjin Son	Decision (unanimous)	GCM: Cage Force 8	September 27, 2008	3	5:00	Tokyo, Japan	
Win	8–2–1	Matteus Lahdesmaki	TKO (punches)	Shooto: Shooto Tradition 2	July 18, 2008	3	2:17	Tokyo, Japan	
Win	7–2–1	Kim Jong-Man	KO (punches)	GCM: Cage Force EX Eastern Bound	February 11, 2008	1	2:13	Tokyo, Japan	
Draw	6–2–1	Joe Camacho	Draw	Shooto: The Arrival: This is Shooto	August 18, 2007	3	5:00	Irvine, California, United States	
Win	6–2	Hideki Kadowaki	Decision (split)	Shooto: Back To Our Roots 2	March 16, 2007	3	5:00	Tokyo, Japan	
Loss	5–2	Akitoshi Tamura	Decision (unanimous)	Shooto: Rookie Tournament Final	December 2, 2006	2	5:00	Tokyo, Japan	
Win	5–1	Daisuke Ishizawa	Decision (unanimous)	Shooto: Champion Carnival	October 14, 2006	2	5:00	Yokohama, Japan	
Win	4–1	Yuji Inoue	Decision (unanimous)	Shooto: Shooting Star	July 30, 2006	2	5:00	Tokyo, Japan	
Win	3–1	Tomonori Taniguchi	Decision (majority)	Shooto: 3/3 in Kitazawa Town Hall	March 3, 2006	2	5:00	Tokyo, Japan	
Loss	2–1	Sakae Kasuya	Decision (majority)	Shooto 2005: 11/6 in Korakuen Hall	November 6, 2005	2	5:00	Tokyo, Japan	
Win	2–0	Hiroshi Nakamura	KO (punch)	Shooto: 5/29 in Kitazawa Town Hall	May 29, 2005	2	3:57	Tokyo, Japan	
Win	1–0	Takshi Sato	KO (punch)	Deep: Chonan Festival	October 3, 2004	1	0:39	Yamagata, Japan	

== Kickboxing record ==
Kickboxing record
1 win, 2 losses, 1 draw
Date	Result	Opponent	Event	Location	Method	Round	Time	Record	Notes
December 29, 2015	Loss	(Japan) Hiroya	Rizin Fighting Federation 1	Saitama, Japan	KO	3		1-3-1	
November 15, 2013	Loss	(Japan) Michihiro Omigawa	Shoot Boxing Battle Summit Ground Zero Tokyo 2013	Tokyo, Japan	Extension round decision (unanimous)	4	3:00	1-2-1	2013 65 kg S-Cup semi-finals.
November 15, 2013	Win	(Japan) Masaya	Shoot Boxing Battle Summit Ground Zero Tokyo 2013	Tokyo, Japan	Decision (unanimous)	3	3:00	1-1-1	2013 65 kg S-Cup quarter-finals.
November 6, 2011	Loss	(Japan) Hiroaki Suzuki	Shooto the Shoot 2011	Tokyo, Japan	Decision (unanimous)	3	3:00	0-1-1	
December 31, 2010	Draw	(Japan) Tetsuya Yamato	Dynamite!! 2010	Saitama, Japan	Decision (majority draw)	3	3:00	0-0-1	
Legend: Win Loss Draw/No contest
