= Daisuke Nakamura (fighter) =

Japanese professional wrestler and mixed martial artist

Daisuke Nakamura 中村大介
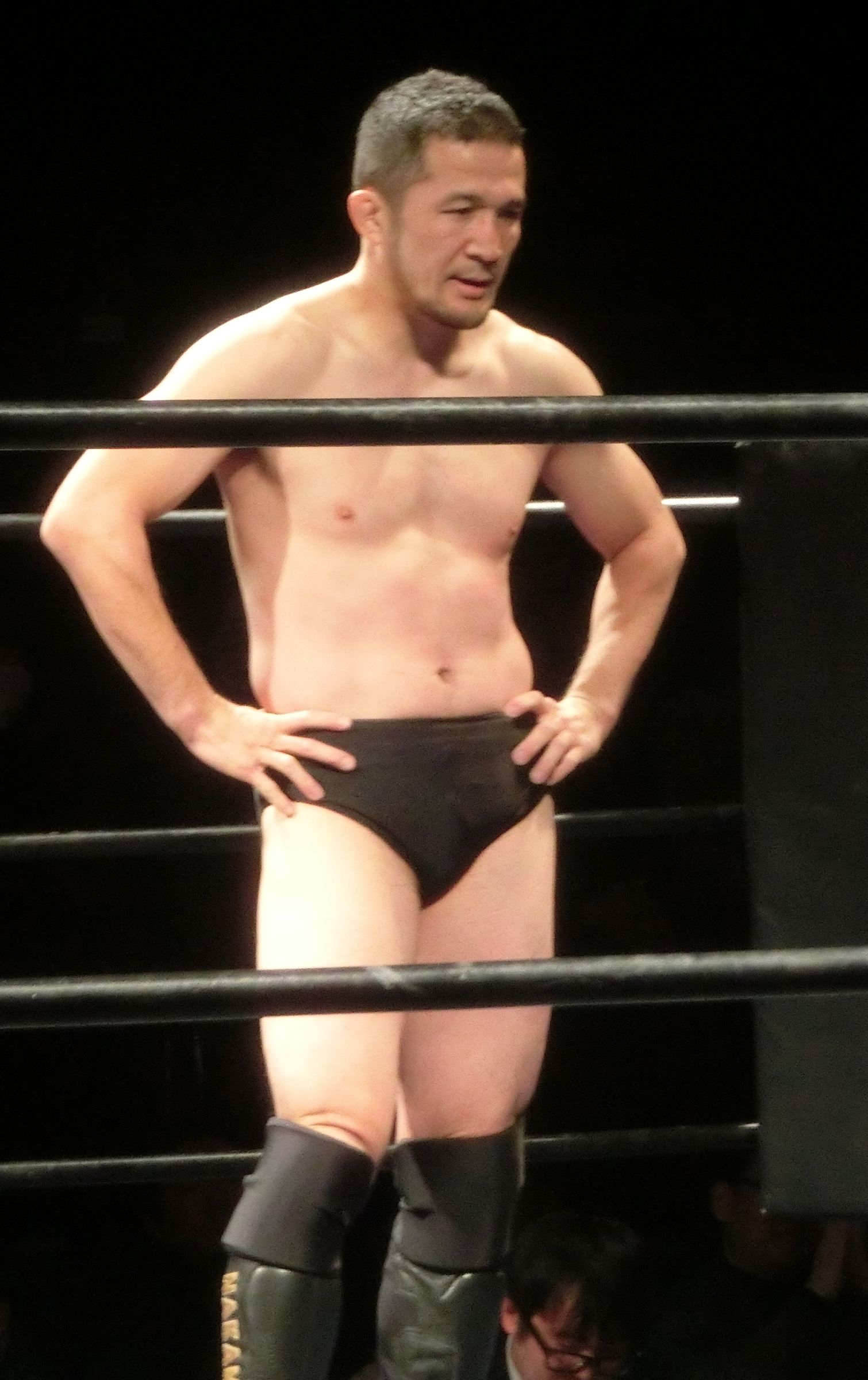
- Nakamura in 2018
- Born: June 10, 1980 (age 46); Adachi-ku, Tokyo, Japan
- Nickname: Die Hard Spirit
- Nationality: Japanese
- Height: 5 ft 9 in (1.75 m)
- Weight: 146 lb (66 kg; 10.4 st)
- Division: Featherweight; Lightweight; Welterweight
- Style: Submission wrestling, shoot wrestling
- Stance: Orthodox
- Fighting out of: Tokyo, Japan
- Team: U-File Camp (2002-present); Yoshida Dojo (2010); Uzukido Honpo
- Teacher: Kiyoshi Tamura
- Rank: A-Class Shootist
- Years active: 2002–2016, 2020–present

Mixed martial arts record
- Total: 66
- Wins: 36
- By knockout: 8
- By submission: 20
- By decision: 8
- Losses: 29
- By knockout: 5
- By submission: 3
- By decision: 21
- Draws: 1

Other information
- Mixed martial arts record from Sherdog

Daisuke Nakamura (Japanese: 中村大介, born June 10, 1980) is a Japanese professional wrestler, mixed martial artist and submission grappler, currently working for Pro Wrestling Noah. He has fought for DREAM, Strikeforce, M-1 Global, ZST, Cage Rage, PRIDE, Vale Tudo Japan, DEEP, K-1 and Cage Force promotions. He is the former DEEP Lightweight Champion. Nakamura is also known for his incredible armbar variations, with most of his wins coming by armbar, and is famous for his tributes to the shoot-style circuit, often wearing the style's signature knee boots and short-tights in his fights.

He has also competed in professional wrestling, working for the U-STYLE promotion led by his trainer Kiyoshi Tamura.

== Mixed martial arts career ==
=== Early career ===
Nakamura had his debut fight in PRIDE Fighting Championship against veteran journeyman Shannon Ritch at PRIDE The Best Vol.2. He showed his skill by submitting Ritch with an inverted armbar. He spent his next years fighting in GCM and DEEP, where he challenged for the Welterweight Championship, losing an effortful match by TKO at the third round. He would later enjoy an 8-match winning streak.

=== Dynamite!! ===
At December 31, 2008, Nakamura was slated to fight at the Dynamite!! event against Hideo Tokoro. This was a notable matchup because both Tokoro and Nakamura both sported similar fighting styles, were trained by former RINGS wrestlers and were seen by Japanese pundits as the heirs of the shoot-style circuit. The match was an exciting and fast-paced grappling contest, with Nakamura trying a flying kimura into an armbar immediately after Tokoro tried to take him down, and then Tokoro captured his back and performed a takedown similar to a German suplex. Daisuke kept trying for an armbar, and they rolled through the mat several times until Tokoro could attempt his own armbar. The bout stalled for several minutes, but it broke out again when Hideo rolled for a leglock. Nakamura, however, capitalized to transition the move into an armbar, making Tokoro finally tap out.

=== DEEP ===
He captured the DEEP Lightweight Championship against Yasuaki Kishimoto and defended it before Pancrase veteran Takafumi Ito, but he lost it to fellow Pancrase exponent Satoru Kitaoka.

Four years departed from his previous fight, Nakamura returned to face Tatsunao Nagakura at DEEP: 97 Impact. He won the fight via second-round knockout.

Nakamura then faced the reigning featherweight champion Juntaro Ushiku in a non-title bout at DEEP 100 on February 21, 2021. He won the fight via second-round knockout.

Nakamura then challenged Ushiku for the DEEP Featherweight Championship in a rematch at DEEP 102 on July 4, 2021. He lost the fight via split decision.

Nakamura faced Suguru Nii at Rizin 31 - Yokohama on October 24, 2021. He won the bout via his signature flying armbar in the first round.

Nakamura faced Michihiro Omigawa at DEEP 106 on February 26, 2022. He won the fight via armbar in the third.

Nakamura faced Sora Yamamoto at Rizin 34 on March 20, 2022. He lost the fight by split decision.

Nakamura faced Yuta Sato at Deep 108 Impact on July 10, 2022. He won the bout by unanimous decision.

Nakamura faced Kouya Kanda at Deep 110 Impact on November 12, 2022. He lost the bout by unanimous decision.

Nakamura faced Tatsuhiko Iwamoto on December 18, 2022 at DEEP Osaka Impact 2022 4th Round, winning the bout via reverse heel hook in the second round.

Nakamura faced Min Woo Kim at Black Combat 5: Song of the Sword on February 4, 2023. He was choked out in the third round via rear-naked choke.

On July 14, 2024, he faced Rikuto "Dark" Shirakawa at DEEP 120 IMPACT, and although it was a close and heated battle, he lost by split decision.

== Professional grappling career ==
Nakamura was scheduled to compete at Quintet 4 on September 10, 2023 where he would represent Team Sakuraba. Nakamura drew his only match and his team went out in the opening round.

== Championships and accomplishments ==
- DEEP
  - DEEP Lightweight Championship (One time; former)
    - One successful title defense

== Mixed martial arts record ==
Professional record breakdown
66 matches	36 wins	29 losses
By knockout	8	5
By submission	20	3
By decision	8	21
Draws	1	

Res.	Record	Opponent	Method	Event	Date	Round	Time	Location	Notes
Win	36–29–1	Asuka Tsubaki	Submission (kneebar)	DEEP 133 Impact	September 13, 2026	1	3:05	Tokyo, Japan	
Loss	35–29–1	Yu Karino	Decision (unanimous)	DEEP 131 Impact: 25th Anniversary	May 3, 2026	3	5:00	Yokohama, Japan	
Win	35–28–1	Taisei Sakuraba	Submission (armbar)	Rizin: Otoko Matsuri	May 4, 2025	2	2:01	Tokyo, Japan	Lightweight bout.
Loss	34–28–1	Hiroto Gomyo	Decision (unanimous)	DEEP 124 Impact	March 15, 2025	3	5:00	Tokyo, Japan	2025 DEEP Featherweight Grand Prix Quarterfinal.
Loss	34–27–1	Lim Jae-yoon	TKO (elbows and punches)	Black Combat Rise 5	October 26, 2024	3	1:22	Osan, South Korea	
Loss	34–26–1	Rikuto Shirakawa	Decision (split)	DEEP 120 Impact	July 14, 2024	3	5:00	Tokyo, Japan	
Loss	34–25–1	Park Chan-soo	Decision (unanimous)	Black Combat 10	January 20, 2024	3	5:00	Seoul, South Korea	
Loss	34–24–1	Jin Aoi	TKO (doctor stoppage)	DEEP 113 Impact	May 7, 2023	2	3:35	Tokyo, Japan	
Loss	34–23–1	Kim Min-woo	Technical Submission (rear-naked choke)	Black Combat 5	February 4, 2023	3	3:49	Incheon, South Korea	
Win	34–22–1	Tatsuhiko Iwamoto	Submission (reverse heel hook)	DEEP Osaka Impact 2022 4th Round	December 18, 2022	2	2:50	Fukushima, Japan	Catchweight (150 lb) bout.
Loss	33–22–1	Kouya Kanda	Decision (unanimous)	DEEP 110 Impact	November 12, 2022	3	5:00	Tokyo, Japan	
Win	33–21–1	Yuta Sato	Decision (unanimous)	DEEP 108 Impact	July 10, 2022	3	5:00	Tokyo, Japan	
Loss	32–21–1	Sora Yamamoto	Decision (split)	Rizin 34	March 20, 2022	3	5:00	Osaka, Japan	Catchweight (150 lb) bout.
Win	32–20–1	Michihiro Omigawa	Submission (armbar)	DEEP 106 Impact	February 26, 2022	3	0:51	Tokyo, Japan	
Win	31–20–1	Suguru Nii	Submission (flying armbar)	Rizin 31	October 24, 2021	1	2:16	Yokohama, Japan	
Loss	30–20–1	Juntaro Ushiku	Decision (split)	DEEP 102 Impact	July 4, 2021	3	5:00	Tokyo, Japan	For the DEEP Featherweight Championship.
Win	30–19–1	Juntaro Ushiku	KO (knee)	DEEP 100 Impact	February 21, 2021	2	0:26	Tokyo, Japan	Featherweight debut.
Win	29–19–1	Tatsunao Nagakura	KO (punch)	DEEP 97 Impact	September 20, 2020	2	0:16	Tokyo, Japan	
Loss	28–19–1	Tsogookhuu Amarsanaa	KO (punch)	MGL-1 vs. DEEP	September 24, 2016	3	1:50	Ulaanbaatar, Mongolia	
Loss	28–18–1	Yuki Kawana	TKO (punches)	Vale Tudo Japan: VTJ 7th	September 13, 2015	3	2:26	Tokyo, Japan	
Loss	28–17–1	Yuki Okano	Decision (unanimous)	DEEP 72 Impact	May 16, 2015	3	5:00	Tokyo, Japan	
Loss	28–16–1	Eiji Ishikawa	Decision (unanimous)	TTF Challenge 04	April 5, 2015	3	5:00	Tokyo, Japan	
Win	28–15–1	Yoichi Fukumoto	TKO (punches)	DEEP 70 Impact	December 21, 2014	3	0:11	Tokyo, Japan	
Draw	27–15-1	Shinji Sasaki	Draw (split)	DEEP 69 Impact	October 26, 2014	3	5:00	Tokyo, Japan	
Loss	27–15	Mizuto Hirota	Decision (unanimous)	DEEP 66 Impact	April 29, 2014	3	5:00	Tokyo, Japan	Catchweight (150 lb) bout.
Loss	27–14	Satoru Kitaoka	Decision (unanimous)	DEEP 62 Impact	April 26, 2013	3	5:00	Tokyo, Japan	Lost the DEEP Lightweight Championship.
Win	27–13	Takafumi Ito	TKO (flying knee and punches)	DEEP 60 Impact	October 19, 2012	2	0:35	Tokyo, Japan	Defended the DEEP Lightweight Championship.
Win	26–13	Yasuaki Kishimoto	Decision (unanimous)	DEEP 58 Impact	June 15, 2012	3	5:00	Tokyo, Japan	Won the vacant DEEP Lightweight Championship.
Win	25–13	Akihiro Gono	Decision (unanimous)	DEEP 57 Impact	February 18, 2012	3	5:00	Tokyo, Japan	
Win	24–13	Kim Chang-hyun	Submission (armbar)	DEEP: Cage Impact 2011 in Tokyo, 1st Round	October 29, 2011	3	3:19	Tokyo, Japan	
Loss	23–13	Katsunori Kikuno	Decision (unanimous)	DREAM: Fight for Japan!	May 29, 2011	3	5:00	Saitama, Japan	
Win	23–12	Toshikazu Iseno	Submission (flying armbar)	DEEP 51 Impact	December 11, 2010	2	1:54	Tokyo, Japan	
Win	22–12	Jai Bradney	Submission (armbar)	Nitro MMA 1	August 27, 2010	1	3:40	Brisbane, Australia	
Win	21–12	Ganjo Tentsuku	Decision (unanimous)	Astra: Yoshida's Farewell	April 25, 2010	3	5:00	Tokyo, Japan	
Loss	20–12	Justin Wilcox	Decision (unanimous)	Strikeforce: Evolution	December 19, 2009	3	5:00	San Jose, California, United States	
Loss	20–11	Naoyuki Kotani	Technical Submission (leg scissor choke)	Fighting Network ZST 22	November 23, 2009	1	1:37	Tokyo, Japan	Return to Lightweight.
Win	20–10	Ferrid Kheder	Decision (unanimous)	M-1 Global: Breakthrough	August 28, 2009	3	5:00	Kansas City, Missouri, United States	Middleweight debut.
Loss	19–10	Mitsuhiro Ishida	Decision (unanimous)	Dream 7	March 8, 2009	2	5:00	Saitama, Japan	
Win	19–9	Hideo Tokoro	Submission (armbar)	Dynamite!! 2008	December 31, 2008	1	2:23	Saitama, Japan	
Win	18–9	Carlos Valeri	Submission (flying armbar)	M-1 Challenge 8	October 29, 2008	1	0:26	Kansas City, Missouri, United States	
Win	17–9	Wim Deputter	Decision (unanimous)	M-1 Challenge 6	August 29, 2008	2	5:00	Seoul, South Korea	
Win	16–9	Andy Ologun	Submission (flying armbar)	Dream 5	July 21, 2008	1	3:41	Osaka, Japan	
Win	15–9	Bogdan Cristea	Decision (unanimous)	M-1 Challenge 5	July 17, 2008	2	5:00	Tokyo, Japan	
Win	14–9	Jung Bu-kyung	KO (punch)	Dream 3	May 11, 2008	2	1:05	Saitama, Japan	
Win	13–9	Yuri Ivlev	Decision (majority)	M-1 Challenge 2	April 3, 2008	2	5:00	Saint Petersburg, Russia	Welterweight bout.
Win	12–9	Kwon A-sol	Submission (armbar)	K-1 HERO'S: Hero's in Korea 2007	October 28, 2007	3	3:09	Seoul, South Korea	Catchweight (161 lb) bout.
Loss	11–9	Vítor Ribeiro	Technical Submission (straight armbar)	Cage Rage 19	December 9, 2006	1	3:55	London, England	For the Cage Rage Lightweight Championship.
Win	11–8	Seichi Ikemoto	Submission (armbar)	PRIDE Bushido 12	August 26, 2006	1	3:36	Nagoya, Japan	Return to Lightweight.
Win	10–8	Michael Johnson	Submission (kimura)	Cage Rage 16	April 22, 2006	1	2:54	London, England	
Win	9–8	Hirohide Fujinuma	Submission (armbar)	DEEP 23 Impact	February 5, 2006	1	0:52	Tokyo, Japan	
Loss	8–8	Hidehiko Hasegawa	Decision (unanimous)	DEEP 22 Impact	December 2, 2005	2	5:00	Yokohama, Japan	Return to Featherweight.
Loss	8–7	Marcus Aurélio	Decision (unanimous)	Pride Bushido 6	April 3, 2005	2	5:00	Yokohama, Japan	Lightweight debut.
Loss	8–6	Jutaro Nakao	TKO (punches)	DEEP: 16th Impact	October 30, 2004	3	3:16	Tokyo, Japan	2004 DEEP Welterweight Tournament Final. For the inaugural DEEP Welterweight Championship.
Win	8–5	Yuji Hoshino	KO (punch)	DEEP: 16th Impact	October 30, 2004	1	4:33	Tokyo, Japan	2004 DEEP Welterweight Tournament Semifinal.
Win	7–5	Tetsuya Onose	TKO (punches)	DEEP 15 Impact	July 3, 2004	1	0:50	Tokyo, Japan	2004 DEEP Welterweight Tournament Quarterfinal.
Loss	6–5	Keita Nakamura	Decision (unanimous)	Greatest Common Multiple: Demolition 040408	April 8, 2004	2	5:00	Tokyo, Japan	
Loss	6–4	Hikaru Sato	Decision (unanimous)	Greatest Common Multiple: Demolition 040118	January 18, 2004	2	5:00	Tokyo, Japan	
Win	6–3	Kazuhiro Hanada	Submission (armbar)	Greatest Common Multiple: Demolition 030923	September 23, 2003	1	4:21	Tokyo, Japan	
Win	5–3	Yutaro Miyamoto	TKO (knees to the body)	Greatest Common Multiple: Demolition 030629	June 29, 2003	2	0:38	Tokyo, Japan	
Loss	4–3	Hidehiko Hasegawa	Decision (unanimous)	Greatest Common Multiple: Demolition 030323	March 27, 2003	2	5:00	Tokyo, Japan	
Win	4–2	Sen Nakadai	Submission (flying armbar)	Greatest Common Multiple: Demolition 030223	February 23, 2003	1	2:54	Tokyo, Japan	
Win	3–2	Nobuhiro Tsurumaki	Submission (armbar)	Greatest Common Multiple: Demolition 030126	January 26, 2003	1	2:06	Tokyo, Japan	
Loss	2–2	Dai Moriyama	Decision (unanimous)	DEEP 7 Impact	December 8, 2002	2	5:00	Tokyo, Japan	2002 DEEP Future King Tournament Semifinal.
Win	2–1	Hitoyo Kimura	Submission (armbar)	DEEP 7 Impact	December 8, 2002	2	0:50	Tokyo, Japan	2002 DEEP Future King Tournament Quarterfinal.
Loss	1–1	Yuji Hisamatsu	Decision (unanimous)	Greatest Common Multiple: Demolition 021013	October 13, 2002	2	5:00	Tokyo, Japan	
Win	1–0	Shannon Ritch	Submission (armbar)	Pride FC: The Best, Vol. 2	July 20, 2002	1	4:28	Tokyo, Japan	Welterweight debut.

== Submission grappling record ==
Result	Opponent	Method	Event	Date	Round	Time	Notes
Win	(Japan) Yu Iizuka	Submission (arm triangle choke)	Gleat MMA Ver.0	December 14, 2022	1	6:06	
Draw	(Japan) Yukinari Tamura	Draw	Quintet Fight Night 4	November 30, 2019	1	N/A	
Win	(Japan) Yutaka Saito	Submission (kneebar)	Quintet Fight Night 4	November 30, 2019	1	N/A	
Win	(Japan) Yutaka Kobayashi	Submission (flying armbar)	Fighting NEXUS	September 22, 2019	1	10:18	
Draw	(Japan) Yoshiyuki Yoshida	Draw	Quintet Fight Night 2	February 3, 2019	1	10:00	
Draw	(Brazil) Antoine Jaoude	Draw	Quintet 3	October 5, 2018	1	N/A	
Draw	(United States) PJ Barch	Draw	Quintet 2	July 16, 2018	1	8:00	
Loss	(Brazil) Roberto Souza	Submission (rear-naked choke)	Quintet Fight Night 1	June 9, 2018	1	1:29	
Win	(Japan) Masanori Kanehara	Submission (armbar)	Quintet Fight Night 1	June 9, 2018	1	2:33	
Loss	(United States) Dan Strauss	Submission (rear-naked choke)	Quintet	April 11, 2018	1	N/A	
Draw	(Japan) Michihiro Omigawa	Draw	Quintet	April 11, 2018	1	10:00	
