= Katsunori Kikuno =

Japanese martial artist (born 1981)

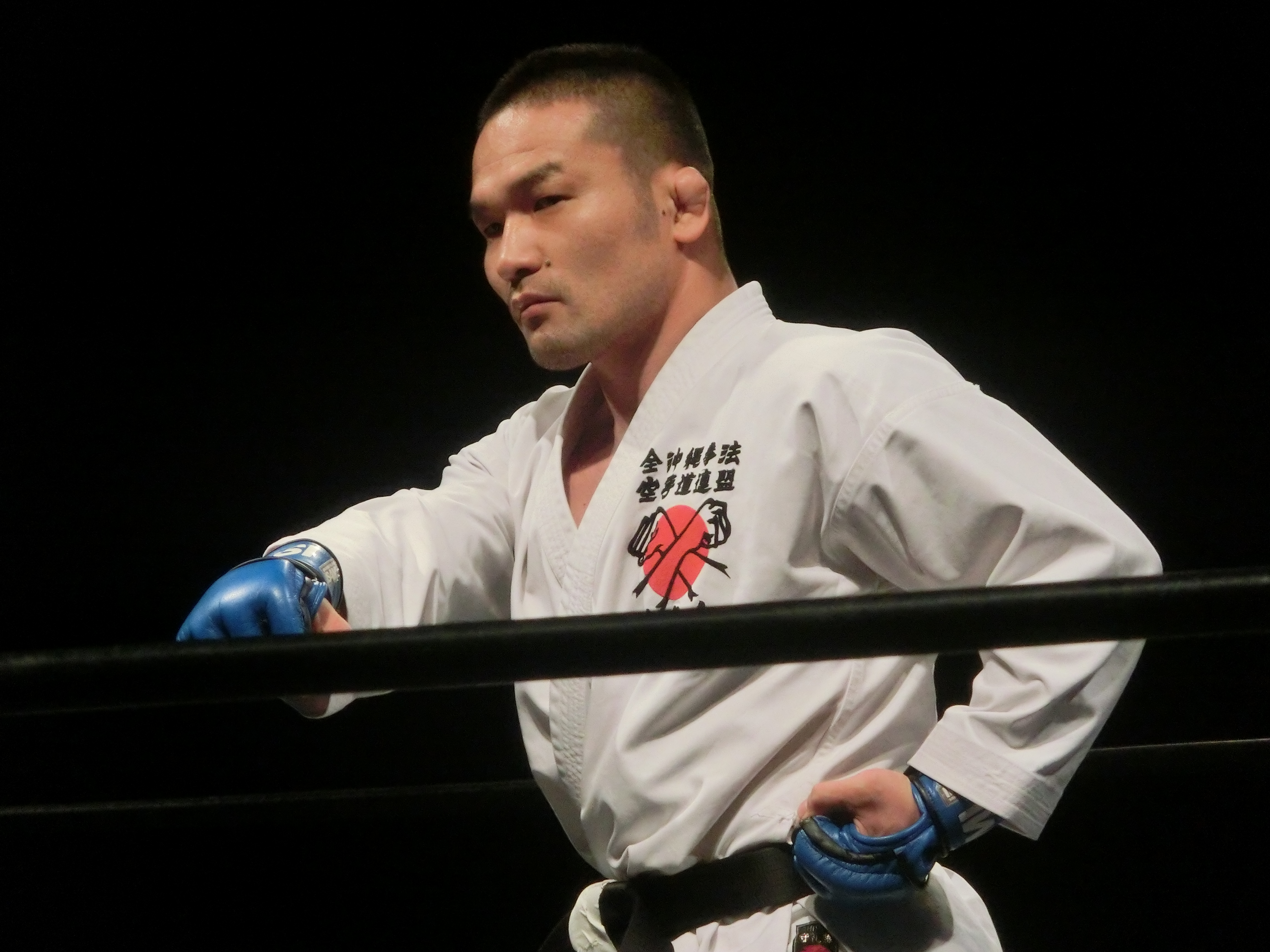
- Kikuno at the Hard Hit professional wrestling event in 2019.
- Born: 菊野克紀; October 30, 1981 (age 44); Kagoshima, Japan
- Nationality: Japanese
- Height: 5 ft 6 in (1.68 m)
- Weight: 145 lb (66 kg; 10 st 5 lb)
- Division: Lightweight; Featherweight
- Reach: 66.0 in (168 cm)
- Style: Okinawan Kenpo Karate, Kyokushin Karate
- Teacher: Ryko Take
- Trainer: Tsuyoshi Kohsaka; Yoshitomo Yamashiro
- Rank: Black belt in World Kyokushin Kaikan; Black belt in Okinawa-Kenpo Karate-Do Oki-Ken-Kai; Black belt in Judo

Mixed martial arts record
- Total: 34
- Wins: 24
- By knockout: 13
- By submission: 3
- By decision: 8
- Losses: 8
- By knockout: 3
- By submission: 1
- By decision: 4
- Draws: 2

Amateur record
- Total: 2
- Draws: 2

Other information
- Mixed martial arts record from Sherdog

Katsunori Kikuno (Japanese: 菊野 克紀, Kikuno Katsunori; born October 30, 1981) is a Japanese mixed martial artist. He was the former DEEP Lightweight Champion.

== Background ==
Kikuno started his martial arts training with judo when he was in high school, and was able to take third place in the Kyushu 66 kg tournament and first in Kagoshima Prefecture 66 kg tournament. After graduating from high school Kikuno took up Kyokushin Karate where he took first in the all Kyushu Tournament and a best 16 spot in the middle division of an All-Japan Tournament, Kikuno was trained under Hitoshi Kiyama. He joined Tsuyoshi Kohsaka’s A-Square MMA team in 2004 and began his career in 2005.

== Mixed martial arts ==
=== Deep ===
Kikuno made his professional mixed martial arts debut in Japanese promotion DEEP's Future King Tournament 2005 defeating Hitoki Tsuti via doctor stoppage and Masashi Takeda via knockout.

At the 2009 DEEP Lightweight Tournament Kikuno became champion after defeating Koichiro Matsumoto via knockout.

=== Dream ===
Kikuno signed with the DREAM promotion after becoming DEEP Lightweight Champion and made his debut against Andre Dida at Dream 10 on July 20, 2009. Kikuno defeated Dida via a flurry of punches, winning his DREAM debut.

=== Ultimate Fighting Championship ===
Kikuno faced Quinn Mulhern on January 4, 2014, at UFC Fight Night 34. He won the fight via unanimous decision.

In his second fight with the promotion, Kikuno faced Tony Ferguson on May 24, 2014, at UFC 173. He lost the fight via knockout in the first round.

Kikuno faced Sam Sicilia at UFC Fight Night 52 on September 20, 2014. He won the fight via submission in the second round.

Kikuno faced Kevin Souza on March 21, 2015, at UFC Fight Night 62. He lost the fight via knockout in the first round.

Kikuno faced Diego Brandão on September 27, 2015, at UFC Fight Night 75. He lost the fight via technical knockout in the first round and was subsequently released from the promotion.

== Championships and accomplishments ==
- DEEP
  - DEEP Lightweight Championship (One time)
  - One successful title defense
  - DEEP Lightweight Championship Tournament Winner
  - 2005 DEEP Future King Tournament Winner

== Mixed martial arts record ==
Professional record breakdown
34 matches	24 wins	8 losses
By knockout	13	3
By submission	3	1
By decision	8	4
Draws	2	

Res.	Record	Opponent	Method	Event	Date	Round	Time	Location	Notes
Win	24–8–2	Takuya Oyama	TKO (punches)	DEEP- 76 Impact	June 26, 2016	2	4:46	Tokyo, Japan	
Loss	23–8–2	Diego Brandão	TKO (punches)	UFC Fight Night: Barnett vs. Nelson	September 27, 2015	1	0:28	Saitama, Japan	
Loss	23–7–2	Kevin Souza	KO (punch)	UFC Fight Night: Maia vs. LaFlare	March 21, 2015	1	1:31	Rio de Janeiro, Brazil	
Win	23–6–2	Sam Sicilia	Submission (rear-naked choke)	UFC Fight Night: Hunt vs. Nelson	September 20, 2014	2	1:38	Saitama, Japan	Featherweight debut.
Loss	22–6–2	Tony Ferguson	KO (punch)	UFC 173	May 24, 2014	1	4:06	Las Vegas, Nevada, United States	
Win	22–5–2	Quinn Mulhern	Decision (unanimous)	UFC Fight Night: Saffiedine vs. Lim	January 4, 2014	3	5:00	Marina Bay, Singapore	
Win	21–5–2	Yong Jae Lee	Submission (rear-naked choke)	Deep: 63 Impact	August 25, 2013	1	4:12	Tokyo, Japan	
Win	20–5–2	Jutaro Nakao	KO (punch)	Deep: Cage Impact 2013	June 15, 2013	1	1:07	Tokyo, Japan	
Win	19–5–2	Takafumi Ito	KO (palm strike)	U-Spirits Again	March 9, 2013	1	0:29	Tokyo, Japan	
Win	18–5–2	Luiz Andrade I	KO (punch)	Deep: Cage Impact 2012 in Tokyo: Semifinals	December 8, 2012	1	0:08	Tokyo, Japan	
Win	17–5–2	Yasuaki Kishimoto	Decision (unanimous)	Deep: 60 Impact	October 19, 2012	3	5:00	Tokyo, Japan	
Loss	16–5–2	Satoru Kitaoka	Decision (unanimous)	Deep: 58 Impact	June 15, 2012	3	5:00	Tokyo, Japan	
Win	16–4–2	Kwang Hee Lee	TKO (punches)	Deep: Cage Impact 2011 in Tokyo, 1st Round	October 29, 2011	1	4:59	Tokyo, Japan	
Loss	15–4–2	Mizuto Hirota	Decision (unanimous)	Deep: 55 Impact	August 26, 2011	3	5:00	Tokyo, Japan	Lost DEEP Lightweight Championship
Win	15–3–2	Daisuke Nakamura	Decision (unanimous)	Dream: Fight for Japan!	May 29, 2011	3	5:00	Tokyo, Japan	
Win	14–3–2	Nobuhiro Obiya	Decision (split)	Deep: 50 Impact	October 24, 2010	3	5:00	Tokyo, Japan	Defended DEEP Lightweight Championship.
Loss	13–3–2	Gesias Cavalcante	Decision (split)	Dream 15	July 10, 2010	2	5:00	Saitama, Japan	
Win	13–2–2	Kuniyoshi Hironaka	KO (punch)	Dream 13	March 22, 2010	1	1:26	Yokohama, Japan	
Loss	12–2–2	Eddie Alvarez	Submission (arm-triangle choke)	Dream 12	October 26, 2009	2	3:42	Osaka, Japan	
Win	12–1–2	Andre Amade	TKO (punches)	Dream 10	July 20, 2009	1	3:47	Saitama, Japan	
Win	11–1–2	Koichiro Matsumoto	KO (punch)	Deep: 41 Impact	April 16, 2009	1	4:32	Tokyo, Japan	DEEP Lightweight Tournament Champion.
Win	10–1–2	Jung Bu-Kyung	TKO (body kick and soccer kicks)	Deep: 40 Impact	February 20, 2009	1	4:15	Tokyo, Japan	DEEP Lightweight Tournament Semifinal.
Win	9–1–2	Jang Yong Kim	Decision (unanimous)	Deep: 39 Impact	December 10, 2008	2	5:00	Tokyo, Japan	DEEP Lightweight Tournament Opening Round.
Win	8–1–2	Yoshihiro Tomioka	TKO (punches)	Deep: 37 Impact	August 17, 2008	2	2:34	Tokyo, Japan	
Win	7–1–2	Seigo Inoue	Decision (unanimous)	Deep: 35 Impact	May 19, 2008	2	5:00	Tokyo, Japan	
Win	6–1–2	Takuhiro Kamikozono	Decision (majority)	Deep: 29 Impact	April 13, 2007	2	5:00	Tokyo, Japan	
Win	5–1–2	Hiroki Nagaoka	Decision (majority)	Deep: 27 Impact	December 20, 2006	2	5:00	Tokyo, Japan	
Win	4–1–2	Yutaka Kobayashi	Submission (rear-naked choke)	Deep: 26 Impact	October 10, 2006	1	3:26	Tokyo, Japan	
Draw	3–1–2	Luiz Andrade I	Draw	Deep: clubDeep Tokyo	July 8, 2006	2	5:00	Tokyo, Japan	
Win	3–1–1	Ichiro Kojima	TKO (punches)	ZST: Swat! 5	June 4, 2006	1	1:18	Tokyo, Japan	
Loss	2–1–1	Yukinari Tamura	Decision (unanimous)	Deep: 23 Impact	February 5, 2006	2	5:00	Tokyo, Japan	
Win	2–0–1	Masashi Takeda	KO (punch)	Deep: Future King Tournament 2005	December 25, 2005	1	2:30	Tokyo, Japan	DEEP Lightweight Future King Tournament Champion.
Win	1–0–1	Hitoki Tsuti	TKO (doctor stoppage)	Deep: Future King Tournament 2005	December 25, 2005	1	5:00	Tokyo, Japan	
Draw	0–0–1	Junpei Chikano	Draw	ZST 8	November 23, 2005	1	5:00	Tokyo, Japan	

=== Mixed martial arts exhibition record ===
Exhibition record breakdown		
1 match	1 win	0 losses
By knockout	1	0

Res.	Record	Opponent	Method	Event	Date	Round	Time	Location	Notes
Win	1–0	Yuichiro Nagashima	TKO (punches)	Fight For Japan: Genki Desu Ka Omisoka 2011	December 31, 2011	2	2:34	Chuo-ku, Saitama City, Japan	

== See also ==
- List of current UFC fighters
- List of male mixed martial artists
