= Kazuhisa Watanabe =

Japanese martial artist

- Born: May 18, 1983 (age 43); Yamanashi, Japan
- Other names: Prince Danger
- Nationality: Japanese
- Height: 5 ft 6 in (1.68 m)
- Weight: 143 lb (65 kg; 10.2 st)
- Division: Featherweight
- Style: Kickboxing, Boxing
- Fighting out of: Tokyo, Japan
- Team: Watanabe Boxing Gym
- Years active: 2001-present

Professional boxing record
- Total: 18
- Wins: 15
- By knockout: 8
- Losses: 3
- By knockout: 2
- Draws: 0

Kickboxing record
- Total: 5
- Wins: 1
- By knockout: 1
- Losses: 4
- Draws: 0

Mixed martial arts record
- Total: 1
- Wins: 0
- Losses: 1
- By submission: 1

Other information
- Boxing record from BoxRec
- Mixed martial arts record from Sherdog

Kazuhisa Watanabe (渡邉 一久, Watanabe Kazuhisa; born May 18, 1983) is a Japanese boxer, kickboxer and mixed martial artist currently competing in K-1 and Dream in the featherweight division. He is known to be overly flamboyant in fights, often jeering and taunting opponents at every opportunity.

== Career ==
Watanabe began his career in professional boxing in 2002. On October 13, 2005, he defeated Norihisa Tomimoto by unanimous decision to claim the Japanese Featherweight Championship. He defended the title twice, against Motokazu Abe and Ikuto Kobayashi, before losing it to Koji Umetsu on October 14, 2006. Watanabe retired from the sport in 2007 with a record of 15 wins (8 by knock out) and 3 losses.

On February 23, 2009, he made his kickboxing debut against Daisuke Uematsu at the K-1 World MAX 2009 Japan Tournament, losing via unanimous decision. He returned at the K-1 World MAX 2009 World Championship Tournament Final 8 on July 13 and defeated Atsushi Yamamoto via technical knockout after knocking him down three times in the first round. This would be his first and only victory in K-1 as he went on to lose his next three bouts against Cheon Jae-Hee, Daiki Hata and Kazuyuki Miyata.

He then ventured into mixed martial arts on December 31, 2010 at Dynamite!! 2010, where he was submitted with an armbar by Hideo Tokoro in the third round.

== Titles ==
- Japanese Featherweight Boxing Champion (2005–2006, 2 defences)

== Boxing record ==
Boxing record
15 wins (8 KOs), 3 losses
Date	Result	Opponent	Venue	Location	Method	Round	Time	Record	Notes
September 26, 2007	Win	(Thailand) Saengcharoen Mahasapcondo	Korakuen Hall	Tokyo, Japan	KO	3	1:56	15-3	
May 24, 2007	Win	(Japan) Kota Suzushino	Korakuen Hall	Tokyo, Japan	Decision (unanimous)	8	3:00	14-3	
October 14, 2006	Loss	(Japan) Koji Umetsu	Korakuen Hall	Tokyo, Japan	Decision (majority)	10	3:00	13-3	Lost Japanese Featherweight Championship.
May 20, 2006	Win	(Japan) Ikuto Kobayashi	Korakuen Hall	Tokyo, Japan	Decision (unanimous)	10	3:00	12-2	Defended Japanese Featherweight Championship.
January 21, 2006	Win	(Japan) Motokazu Abe	Korakuen Hall	Tokyo, Japan	KO	1	1:59	12-2	Defended Japanese Featherweight Championship.
October 13, 2005	Win	(Japan) Norihisa Tomimoto	Korakuen Hall	Tokyo, Japan	Decision (unanimous)	8	3:00	11-2	Won Japanese Featherweight Championship.
September 22, 2005	Win	(Thailand) Runktawan Sor Vorapin	City Gymnasium	Akita City, Japan	KO	5	2:57	10-2	
April 18, 2005	Win	(Japan) Ryuta Miyagi	Korakuen Hall	Tokyo, Japan	Decision (unanimous)	10	3:00	9-2	
February 16, 2005	Win	(Thailand) Raisak Porfahkamron	Korakuen Hall	Tokyo, Japan	KO	1	1:42	8-2	
September 4, 2004	Win	(Japan) Atsushi Tsuburaya	Korakuen Hall	Tokyo, Japan	Decision (unanimous)	8	3:00	7-2	
May 23, 2004	Win	(Japan) Kenichi Nakayama	Kose Sports Park	Kōfu, Japan	TKO	6	2:52	6-2	
February 10, 2004	Win	(Japan) Yosuke Tsuda	Korakuen Hall	Tokyo, Japan	Decision (unanimous)	6	3:00	5-2	
November 15, 2003	Win	(Japan) Hajime Tanaka	Korakuen Hall	Tokyo, Japan	Decision (unanimous)	4	3:00	4-2	
July 29, 2003	Loss	(Japan) Atsushi Sakurai	Korakuen Hall	Tokyo, Japan	KO	1	0:43	3-2	
June 13, 2003	Win	(Japan) Shinya Saito	Korakuen Hall	Tokyo, Japan	KO	1	2:37	3-1	
May 3, 2003	Win	(Japan) Tatsuya Yokoyama	Korakuen Hall	Tokyo, Japan	KO	1	1:55	2-1	
February 10, 2003	Loss	(Japan) Atsushi Sakurai	Korakuen Hall	Tokyo, Japan	KO	3	0:31	1-1	
November 20, 2002	Win	(Japan) Ken Komuro	Korakuen Hall	Tokyo, Japan	KO	1	2:30	1-0	
Legend: Win Loss Draw/No contest

== Kickboxing record ==
Kickboxing record
1 win (1 KO), 4 losses
Date	Result	Opponent	Event	Location	Method	Round	Time	Record	Notes
July 5, 2010	Loss	(Japan) Kazuyuki Miyata	K-1 World MAX 2010 -70kg Tournament Final 16 -63kg Japan Tournament Final	Tokyo, Japan	Decision (unanimous)	3	3:00	1-4	
March 27, 2010	Loss	(Japan) Daiki Hata	K-1 World MAX 2010 –70 kg Japan Tournament	Saitama, Japan	Decision (unanimous)	3	3:00	1-3	
October 26, 2009	Loss	(South Korea) Cheon Jae-Hee	K-1 World MAX 2009 World Championship Tournament Final	Yokohama, Japan	Decision (split)	3	3:00	1-2	
July 13, 2009	Win	(Japan) Atsushi Yamamoto	K-1 World MAX 2009 World Championship Tournament Final 8	Tokyo, Japan	TKO (3 knockdowns)	1	2:40	1-1	
February 23, 2009	Loss	(Japan) Daisuke Uematsu	K-1 World MAX 2009 Japan Tournament	Tokyo, Japan	Decision (unanimous)	3	3:00	0-1	
Legend: Win Loss Draw/No contest

== Mixed martial arts record ==
Res.	Record	Opponent	Method	Event	Date	Round	Time	Location	Notes
Loss	0-1	(Japan) Hideo Tokoro	Submission (armbar)	Dynamite!! 2010	December 31, 2010	3	2:50	Saitama, Saitama, Japan	
