= Kuniyoshi Hironaka =

Japanese mixed martial artist

- Born: June 17, 1976 (age 50); Yamaguchi, Japan
- Nationality: Japanese
- Height: 5 ft 10 in (1.78 m)
- Weight: 155 lb (70 kg; 11.1 st)
- Division: Lightweight; Welterweight
- Style: Judo, BJJ, Shootboxing
- Team: Master Japan; Academia Az
- Rank: 2nd dan black belt in Judo; Black belt in Brazilian jiu-jitsu

Kickboxing record
- Total: 3
- Wins: 2
- By knockout: 2
- Losses: 1
- By knockout: 1

Mixed martial arts record
- Total: 32
- Wins: 23
- By knockout: 7
- By submission: 8
- By decision: 8
- Losses: 9
- By knockout: 6
- By submission: 1
- By decision: 2

Other information
- Mixed martial arts record from Sherdog
- Last updated on: November 15, 2013

Kuniyoshi Hironaka (Japanese: 弘中邦佳, Hironaka Kuniyoshi; born June 17, 1976) is a Japanese mixed martial artist who competes in the Lightweight division. He has formerly competed for the UFC, Shooto, DREAM, and Pancrase.

== Mixed martial arts career ==
=== Early career ===
Hironaka made his professional mixed martial arts debut in 2001 for the Shooto promotion and compiled a record of 10-2 with notable wins over Nick Diaz, Ryan Schultz, and Renato Verissimo before being signed by the UFC.

=== Ultimate Fighting Championship ===
Hironaka made his UFC debut at UFC 64 on October 14, 2006 against Jon Fitch. Hironaka lost via unanimous decision.

In his next appearance at UFC Fight Night 9, Hironaka defeated Forrest Petz via unanimous decision.

Hironaka then fought Thiago Alves at UFC Fight Night 11 and was defeated via TKO in the second round.

Hironaka faced Canadian Jonathan Goulet at UFC 83 and was defeated in the second round via TKO. Hironaka was then released from the promotion.

=== Post-UFC ===
In his first fight since his release from the UFC, Hironaka defeated Motoki Miyazawa at Dream 5 via TKO due to a cut. Hironaka then faced Hayato Sakurai at Dream 6 and was defeated via unanimous decision.

After the loss to Sakurai, Hironaka dropped down to the Lightweight division and won his next four consecutive fights, capturing the Cage Force Lightweight Championship after it had been vacated by Mizuto Hirota.

After dropping two consecutive losses to Katsunori Kikuno and Satoru Kitaoka, respectively, Hironaka bounced back with two consecutive wins, warranting a title shot for the newly vacated Shooto World Lightweight Championship against Kotetsu Boku. Hironaka won via unanimous decision, and then defended his title against Giovani Diniz via first-round TKO.

Hironaka then fought at Pancrase: 257 on March 30, 2014 against Isao Kobayashi. Hironaka was defeated via TKO in the third round.

== Grappling career ==
In 2004, Hironaka fought against Shinya Aoki in a superfight at the Reversal Cup. Hironaka was submitted with a flying armbar that broke his arm, preventing him from competing for several months.

== Kickboxing record ==
Kickboxing record
2 wins (2 KOs), 1 loss, 0 draws
Date	Result	Opponent	Event	Location	Method	Round	Time	Record
2013-11-15	Win	(Thailand) Bovy Sor Udomson	Shoot Boxing Battle Summit Ground Zero Tokyo 2013, Final	Tokyo, Japan	KO (right cross)	2		2-1
2011-02-19	Loss	(Japan) Satoru Suzuki	Shootboxing 2011: Act 1	Tokyo, Japan	TKO (right hook)	1	1:55	1-1
2010-02-13	Win	(Japan) Shinichiro Kuroki	Shoot Boxing 25th Anniversary	Tokyo, Japan	KO (punches)	2	2:24	1-0
Legend: Win Loss Draw/No contest Notes

== Mixed martial arts record ==
Professional record breakdown
32 matches	23 wins	9 losses
By knockout	7	6
By submission	8	1
By decision	8	2

Res.	Record	Opponent	Method	Event	Date	Round	Time	Location	Notes
Win	23–9	Dong Hyun Ma	Submission (arm-triangle choke)	Vale Tudo Japan: VTJ 6th	October 4, 2014	2	2:33	Tokyo, Japan	
Loss	22–9	Isao Kobayashi	TKO (punch and soccer kick)	Pancrase: 257	March 30, 2014	3	3:58	Yokohama, Kanagawa, Japan	
Win	22–8	Yoshihiro Koyama	Submission (armbar)	Shooto: 4th Round 2013	September 29, 2013	4	3:46	Tokyo, Japan	
Win	21–8	Carlo Prater	Decision (unanimous)	Vale Tudo Japan: VTJ 1st	December 24, 2012	3	5:00	Tokyo, Japan	
Win	20–8	Giovani Diniz	TKO (punches)	Shooto: 5th Round	May 18, 2012	1	4:05	Tokyo, Japan	Defended the Shooto World Lightweight Championship.
Win	19–8	Kotetsu Boku	Decision (unanimous)	Shooto: Shootor's Legacy 3	July 18, 2011	3	5:00	Osaka, Japan	Won the Shooto World Lightweight Championship.
Win	18–8	Takashi Nakakura	Decision (unanimous)	Shooto: Shooto Tradition 2011	April 29, 2011	3	5:00	Osaka, Japan	
Win	17–8	Kiyonobu Nishikata	Submission (rear-naked choke)	GCM: Demolition West in Yamaguchi 2	November 21, 2010	1	1:52	Osaka, Japan	
Loss	16–8	Satoru Kitaoka	Submission (guillotine choke)	Pancrase: Passion Tour 9	October 3, 2010	2	4:22	Tokyo, Japan	
Loss	16–7	Katsunori Kikuno	KO (punch)	Dream 13	Mar 22, 2010	1	1:26	Yokohama, Japan	
Win	16–6	Won Sik Park	TKO (corner stoppage)	Dream 12	October 25, 2009	1	5:00	Osaka, Japan	
Win	15–6	Yoshihiro Koyama	TKO (punches)	Cage Force	September 12, 2009	1	4:27	Tokyo, Japan	Won the Cage Force Lightweight Championship.
Win	14–6	Katsuhiko Nagata	TKO (punches)	Cage Force	June 27, 2009	1	3:41	Tokyo, Japan	
Win	13–6	Naoyuki Kotani	Submission (reverse full-nelson)	ZST	May 24, 2009	2	2:43	Tokyo, Japan	Lightweight debut.
Loss	12–6	Hayato Sakurai	Decision (unanimous)	Dream 6: Middleweight Grand Prix 2008 Final Round	September 23, 2008	2	5:00	Saitama, Saitama, Japan	
Win	12–5	Motoki Miyazawa	TKO (cut)	Dream 5: Lightweight Grand Prix 2008 Final Round	July 21, 2008	1	8:57	Osaka, Japan	
Loss	11–5	Jonathan Goulet	TKO (punches)	UFC 83	April 19, 2008	2	2:07	Montreal, Quebec, Canada	Fight of the Night.
Loss	11–4	Thiago Alves	TKO (punch and knee)	UFC Fight Night 11	September 19, 2007	2	4:04	Nevada, United States	
Win	11–3	Forrest Petz	Decision (unanimous)	UFC Fight Night: Stevenson vs. Guillard	April 5, 2007	3	5:00	Nevada, United States	
Loss	10–3	Jon Fitch	Decision (unanimous)	UFC 64: Unstoppable	October 14, 2006	3	5:00	Nevada, United States	
Win	10–2	Renato Verissimo	TKO (strikes)	ROTR 9: Rumble on the Rock 9	April 21, 2006	2	3:03	Hawaii, United States	
Win	9–2	Ryan Schultz	Submission (armbar)	MARS: MARS	February 4, 2006	2	1:40	Tokyo, Japan	
Win	8–2	Takuya Wada	Submission (triangle choke)	GCM: D.O.G. 4	December 11, 2005	1	4:29	Tokyo, Japan	
Loss	7–2	Shinya Aoki	TKO (cut)	Shooto 2005: 11/6 in Korakuen Hall	November 6, 2005	1	2:10	Tokyo, Japan	
Win	7–1	Ramunas Komas	Decision	Shooto Lithuania: Bushido	November 20, 2004	N/A		Lithuania	
Win	6–1	Mark Moreno	Submission (neck crank)	SB 29: SuperBrawl 29	May 9, 2003	1	2:50	Hawaii, United States	
Win	5–1	Nick Diaz	Decision (split)	Shooto: Year End Show 2002	December 14, 2002	3	5:00	Tokyo, Japan	
Win	4–1	Yasuyuki Tokuoka	Decision (unanimous)	Shooto: Treasure Hunt 11	November 15, 2002	2	5:00	Tokyo, Japan	
Win	3–1	Yuji Kusu	TKO (swollen eye)	Shooto: Gig East 10	August 27, 2002	2	3:47	Tokyo, Japan	
Loss	2–1	Hirofumi Hara	TKO (punches)	Shooto: Treasure Hunt 9	May 28, 2002	1	4:34	Tokyo, Japan	
Win	2–0	Toru Nakayama	Submission (triangle choke)	Shooto: Treasure Hunt 4	March 13, 2002	1	3:10	Tokyo, Japan	
Win	1–0	Takayuki Okochi	Decision (unanimous)	Shooto: GIG East 6	October 23, 2001	2	5:00	Tokyo, Japan	

== See also ==
- List of current mixed martial arts champions
- List of male mixed martial artists
