= Dream 15 =

Mixed martial arts event in 2010

- The poster for Dream 15
- Promotion: Dream
- Date: July 10, 2010
- Venue: Saitama Super Arena
- City: Saitama, Japan
- Attendance: 13,028

Event chronology
Dream 14	Dream 15	Dream 16

Dream 15 was a mixed martial arts event held by Fighting and Entertainment Group's mixed martial arts promotion Dream. The event took place on July 10, 2010, at the Saitama Super Arena in Saitama, Japan. The event aired live in North America on HDNet.

== Background ==
A Light Heavyweight Grand Prix was originally expected to start at Dream 14, with an eight-man tournament. However, Dream 15 hosted the opening round of the Grand Prix, with only a four-man tournament.

Alistair Overeem was briefly rumoured to be fighting Ricco Rodriguez, but the fight was called off.

== Results ==
Main Card
Weight class				Method	Round	Time	Notes
Lightweight	Shinya Aoki	def.	Tatsuya Kawajiri	Submission (Achilles Lock)	1	1:53
Lightweight	Gesias Cavalcante	def.	Katsunori Kikuno	Decision (Split)	2	5:00
Light Heavyweight	Gegard Mousasi	def.	Jake O'Brien	Submission (Standing Guillotine Choke)	1	0:31
Light Heavyweight	Tatsuya Mizuno	def.	Melvin Manhoef	Submission (Kimura)	1	7:38
Featherweight	Michihiro Omigawa	def.	Young Sam Jung	Submission (Guillotine Choke)	1	7:31
Featherweight	Mitsuhiro Ishida	def.	Daiki Hata	Decision (Unanimous)	2	5:00
Middleweight	Kazuhiro Nakamura	def.	Karl Amoussou	Decision (Unanimous)	2	5:00

== 2010 Light Heavyweight Grand Prix Bracket ==
Semi-finals
(Netherlands) Melvin Manhoef	1
(Japan) Tatsuya Mizuno	SUB
(Armenia) Gegard Mousasi	SUB
(United States) Jake O'Brien	1

Final
(Japan) Tatsuya Mizuno
(Armenia) Gegard Mousasi

== Notes ==
After Jake O'Brien failed to make weight, his Light Heavyweight Grand Prix Opening Round bout against Gegard Mousasi was made into a 212-lbs catchweight bout. O'Brien started with a yellow card, a point deduction and a 10% purse deduction.

== See also ==
- Dream (mixed martial arts)
- List of Dream champions
- 2010 in DREAM
