= Michihiro Omigawa =

Japanese mixed martial artist

Michihiro Omigawa 小見川道大
- Born: December 19, 1975 (age 50); Ibaraki Prefecture, Japan
- Other names: Michi
- Nationality: Japanese
- Height: 5 ft 6 in (1.68 m)
- Weight: 145 lb (66 kg; 10.4 st)
- Division: Featherweight; Lightweight
- Reach: 68 in (173 cm)
- Style: Judo, Boxing
- Fighting out of: Tokyo, Japan

Kickboxing record
- Total: 3
- Wins: 2
- Losses: 1
- By knockout: 1

Mixed martial arts record
- Total: 35
- Wins: 19
- By knockout: 5
- By submission: 5
- By decision: 9
- Losses: 15
- By knockout: 2
- By submission: 1
- By decision: 12
- Draws: 1

Other information
- Mixed martial arts record from Sherdog
- Judo career
- Weight class: ‍–‍66 kg
- Rank: 3rd dan black belt
- Club: Neo Judo Academy Omigawa Dojo

Judo achievements and titles
- Asian Champ.: (silver) (2001)
Medal record
Men's judo
Representing Japan
Asian Games
Bronze medal – third place	2002 Busan	‍–‍66 kg
Asian Championships
Silver medal – second place	2001 Ulaanbaatar	‍–‍66 kg
Summer Universiade
Gold medal – first place	1999 Palma de Mallorca	‍–‍66 kg

Profile at external judo databases
- JudoInside.com: 1040
- Last updated on: February 26, 2022

Michihiro Omigawa (Japanese: 小見川道大, Omigawa Michihiro; born December 19, 1975) is a retired Japanese mixed martial artist, judoka and submission grappler, who mainly competed in the Featherweight division. A professional competitor since 2005, Omigawa competed in the UFC, PRIDE, Cage Rage, World Victory Road, DREAM, DEEP, and Shooto.

== Background ==
Omigawa is from Ibaraki Prefecture, Japan and began training in judo when he was in elementary school. He attended Tsuchiuranichidai High School with fellow mixed martial artists Hayato Sakurai and Kazuyuki Miyata. Omigawa's grandfather, who he was named after, died the day before his graduation. Omigawa attended the International Budo University in the Chiba Prefecture of Japan.

Omigawa has won various judo tournaments and medals during his career. He received the silver medal at the 2001 Asian Judo Championships in Ulaanbaatar, Mongolia, and earned a bronze medal at the 2002 Asian Games in Busan, South Korea all for the 66 kg weight class division.

== Mixed martial arts career ==
Omigawa made his professional mixed martial arts debut in 2005 against future UFC veteran Aaron Riley at PRIDE Bushido 7. Omigawa and Riley traded punches before Omigawa was knocked out by a head kick six minutes into the first round. Omigawa then fought for the British Cage Rage organization against future two-time K-1 HERO'S Middleweight Champion Gesias Calvacante. He again lost this fight by knockout, this time from an overhand right.

After a majority decision loss to Kazunori Yokota brought Omigawa's record to 1-4, he then strung together three consecutive wins in the DEEP organization, before making his UFC debut at UFC 76 against Matt Wiman. He lost this fight via unanimous decision. Omigawa then fought again for the UFC at UFC Fight Night: Swick vs Burkman against Thiago Tavares and lost again via unanimous decision.

After cutting down to the Featherweight division, Omigawa's recognition and career began to take off. Though he lost his division debut against future WEC and UFC veteran Jung Chan-Sung, Omigawa made a resurgence when he entered the Sengoku Featherweight Grand Prix tournament promoted by World Victory Road. As a heavy underdog he defeated the likes of LC Davis via unanimous decision and Nam Phan via TKO. In the semi-final he faced then-undefeated Pancrase Featherweight Champion and future Sengoku Featherweight Champion Marlon Sandro. This fight was originally ruled as a majority draw before Omigawa was awarded the victory by split decision. This brought Omigawa to the final of the tournament against Masanori Kanehara (the semi-finalist loser) who stood in for Hatsu Hioki as Hioki could not continue to compete. Omigawa lost by a close split decision against Kanehara but in return earned him the recognition as a strong Featherweight.

After the tournament Omigawa continued to earn a spot as a world top five Featherweight, defeating the likes of Hatsu Hioki via a controversial split decision, Hiroyuki Takaya via TKO at Dynamite!! 2009, Micah Miller, and Cole Escovedo via armbar.

=== Return to the UFC ===
The 12-8-1 Omigawa re-signed with the UFC in the Featherweight division and he faced then-undefeated Chad Mendes on February 5, 2011 at UFC 126. He lost the fight via unanimous decision.

Omigawa was defeated by Darren Elkins via unanimous decision on June 11, 2011 at UFC 131. The decision was considered controversial, and despite the loss, UFC president Dana White stated on his Twitter account that both fighters would be paid a win bonus.

Omigawa faced British fighter Jason Young on November 5, 2011 at UFC 138 and won the fight via unanimous decision.

Omigawa next faced former Jungle Fight Lightweight Champion Yuri Alcântara on January 14, 2012 at UFC 142. Omigawa lost the fight via unanimous decision.

Omigawa fought fellow judoka Manny Gamburyan on August 4, 2012 at UFC on FOX 4. He lost via unanimous decision. After back-to-back losses in the UFC, Omigawa was released from the promotion yet again.

=== Post-UFC ===
Omigawa fought at DREAM 18 against Tatsuya Kawajiri on New Year's Eve 2012. Omigawa lost via unanimous decision. The loss puts Omigawa at 1-6 in his last seven fights, all of which have gone to a decision.

=== Road FC ===
In May 2013, it was announced that Omigawa had signed with Korea's ROAD FC and would debut against fellow judo practitioner, Bae Young Kwon at Road FC 12. After a back and forth fight, Omigawa lost a controversial decision.

=== Shootboxing ===
Bringing his boxing and judo skills to the kickboxing/grappling hybrid sport of shootboxing, Omigawa entered the 2013 –65 kg S-Cup held at Shoot Boxing Battle Summit Ground Zero Tokyo 2013 in Tokyo, Japan on November 15, 2013. After defeating Yuki Hiroshi Kimaya by unanimous decision in the quarter-finals, he then faced fellow mixed martial artist "Wicky" Akiyo Nishiura in the semis. The fight was ruled a majority draw after the regulation three rounds and so went to an extension round to produce a winner, after which Omigawa was given the nod by all three judges. In the tournament final, he fell victim to a flying knee from Hiroaki Suzuki, losing by knockout in round two.

=== Retirement Bout ===
After winning the next 6 bouts after his loss in Road FC, mostly fighting under the banner of DEEP, Omigawa announced that he would be facing Daisuke Nakamura in his retirement bout at DEEP 106 on February 26, 2022. He lost the bout the fight via armbar in the third and retired afterwards.

== Championships and accomplishments ==
=== Kickboxing ===
- World Shoot Boxing Association
  - 2013 65 kg S-Cup Runner-up

=== Mixed martial arts ===
- Sengoku Raiden Championships
  - 2009 Sengoku Featherweight Grand Prix Runner Up

== Kickboxing record ==
Kickboxing record
2 wins (0 KOs), 1 loss, 0 draws
Date	Result	Opponent	Event	Location	Method	Round	Time	Record
2013-11-15	Loss	(Japan) Hiroaki Suzuki	Shoot Boxing Battle Summit Ground Zero Tokyo 2013, Final	Tokyo, Japan	KO (right flying knee)	2		2-1
For the 2013 65kg S-Cup Championship.
2013-11-15	Win	(Japan) Akiyo Nishiura	Shoot Boxing Battle Summit Ground Zero Tokyo 2013, Semi Finals	Tokyo, Japan	Extension round decision (unanimous)	4	3:00	2-0
2013-11-15	Win	(Japan) Yuki Hiroshi Kimaya	Shoot Boxing Battle Summit Ground Zero Tokyo 2013, Quarter Finals	Tokyo, Japan	Decision (unanimous)	3	3:00	1-0
Legend: Win Loss Draw/No contest Notes

== Mixed martial arts record ==
Professional record breakdown
35 matches	19 wins	15 losses
By knockout	5	2
By submission	5	1
By decision	9	12
Draws	1	

Res.	Record	Opponent	Method	Event	Date	Round	Time	Location	Notes
Loss	19–15–1	Daisuke Nakamura	Submission (armbar)	DEEP 106 Impact	February 26, 2022	3	0:51	Tokyo, Japan	
Win	19–14–1	Akihiko Mouri	KO (punch)	DEEP 92 Impact	October 22, 2019	3	1:49	Tokyo, Japan	
Win	18–14–1	Yuka Ohara	Submission (head and arm choke)	DEEP 90 Impact	June 29, 2019	2	2:03	Tokyo, Japan	
Win	17–14–1	Teddy Violet	Decision (split)	WSOF Global Championship 2	February 7, 2016	3	5:00	Tokyo, Japan	
Win	16–14–1	Yoshifumi Nakamura	Decision (unanimous)	Grandslam MMA 3: Way of the Cage	September 12, 2015	3	5:00	Tokyo, Japan	
Win	15–14–1	Kosuke Umeda	Submission (guillotine choke)	DEEP Cage Impact 2015	July 20, 2015	1	1:26	Tokyo, Japan	
Win	14–14–1	Peter Cepeda	Submission (straight armbar)	DEEP 68 Impact	August 23, 2014	1	1:02	Tokyo, Japan	
Loss	13–14–1	Bae Young Kwon	Decision (unanimous)	Road FC 012	June 22, 2013	2	5:00	Gwandong, South Korea	
Loss	13–13–1	Tatsuya Kawajiri	Decision (unanimous)	DREAM 18	December 31, 2012	3	5:00	Tokyo, Japan	
Loss	13–12–1	Manvel Gamburyan	Decision (unanimous)	UFC on Fox: Shogun vs. Vera	August 4, 2012	3	5:00	Los Angeles, California, United States	
Loss	13–11–1	Iuri Alcântara	Decision (unanimous)	UFC 142	January 14, 2012	3	5:00	Rio de Janeiro, Brazil	
Win	13–10–1	Jason Young	Decision (unanimous)	UFC 138	November 5, 2011	3	5:00	Birmingham, England	
Loss	12–10–1	Darren Elkins	Decision (unanimous)	UFC 131	June 11, 2011	3	5:00	Vancouver, British Columbia, Canada	
Loss	12–9–1	Chad Mendes	Decision (unanimous)	UFC 126	February 5, 2011	3	5:00	Las Vegas, Nevada, United States	
Win	12–8–1	Cole Escovedo	Submission (inverted armbar)	DREAM 16	September 25, 2010	1	2:30	Nagoya, Japan	
Win	11–8–1	Young Sam Jung	Submission (guillotine choke)	DREAM 15	July 7, 2010	1	7:31	Saitama, Japan	
Win	10–8–1	Micah Miller	Decision (unanimous)	Astra: Yoshida's Farewell	April 25, 2010	3	5:00	Tokyo, Japan	
Win	9–8–1	Hiroyuki Takaya	TKO (punches)	Dynamite!! The Power of Courage 2009	December 31, 2009	1	2:54	Saitama, Japan	
Win	8–8–1	Hatsu Hioki	Decision (split)	World Victory Road Presents: Sengoku 11	November 6, 2009	3	5:00	Tokyo, Japan	
Loss	7–8–1	Masanori Kanehara	Decision (split)	World Victory Road Presents: Sengoku 9	August 2, 2009	3	5:00	Saitama, Japan	Sengoku Featherweight Grandprix Final, Hioki was unable to compete in finals.
Win	7–7–1	Marlon Sandro	Decision (split)	World Victory Road Presents: Sengoku 9	August 2, 2009	3	5:00	Saitama, Japan	Sengoku Featherweight Grandprix Semifinal; originally a majority draw.
Win	6–7–1	Nam Phan	TKO (punches)	World Victory Road Presents: Sengoku 8	May 2, 2009	1	4:52	Tokyo, Japan	Sengoku Featherweight Grandprix Second Round.
Win	5–7–1	LC Davis	Decision (unanimous)	World Victory Road Presents: Sengoku 7	March 30, 2009	3	5:00	Tokyo, Japan	Sengoku Featherweight Grandprix Opening Round.
Draw	4–7–1	Shintaro Ishiwatari	Draw	Shooto: Shooto Tradition 5	January 18, 2009	2	5:00	Tokyo, Japan	Featherweight debut.
Loss	4–7	Jung Chan-Sung	Decision (unanimous)	Deep: Gladiator	August 16, 2008	2	5:00	Okayama, Japan	
Loss	4–6	Thiago Tavares	Decision (unanimous)	UFC Fight Night: Swick vs Burkman	January 23, 2008	3	5:00	Las Vegas, Nevada, United States	
Loss	4–5	Matt Wiman	Decision (unanimous)	UFC 76	September 22, 2007	3	5:00	Anaheim, California, United States	
Win	4–4	Naoki Matsushita	TKO (punches)	Deep: 29 Impact	April 13, 2007	2	1:17	Tokyo, Japan	
Win	3–4	Woo Jin Eoh	TKO (punch)	Deep: 28 Impact	February 16, 2007	1	4:25	Tokyo, Japan	
Win	2–4	Takaaki Aoki	Decision (unanimous)	Deep: clubDeep Tokyo: Future King Tournament 2006	December 9, 2006	2	5:00	Tokyo, Japan	
Loss	1–4	Kazunori Yokota	Decision (majority)	Deep: 26 Impact	October 10, 2006	3	5:00	Tokyo, Japan	
Loss	1–3	Yoshihiro Tomioka	Decision (unanimous)	Deep: clubDeep Toyama: Barbarian Festival 4	June 18, 2006	3	5:00	Toyama, Toyama, Japan	
Win	1–2	Jason Chambers	Decision (split)	ICON Sport: Lawler vs. Niko 2	February 25, 2006	3	5:00	Honolulu, Hawaii, United States	
Loss	0–2	Gesias Cavalcante	KO (punches)	Cage Rage 14	December 3, 2005	1	0:49	London, England	
Loss	0–1	Aaron Riley	KO (head kick)	PRIDE: Bushido 7	May 22, 2005	1	6:00	Tokyo, Japan	

== Submission grappling record ==
KO PUNCHES

Result	Opponent	Method	Event	Date	Round	Time	Notes
Draw	(United States) Thomas Mietz	Draw	Quintet Fight Night 2	February 3, 2019	1	10:00	
Draw	(Japan) Daisuke Nakamura	Draw	Quintet	April 11, 2018	1	10:00	
