= André Amado =

Brazilian mixed martial artist and kickboxer

André Schervinski Amado
- Born: Andre Shervniski Amado; 9 October 1983 (age 43); Curitiba, Brazil
- Other names: Dida
- Height: 5 ft 8 in (1.73 m)
- Weight: 154 lb (70 kg; 11.0 st)
- Division: Lightweight
- Stance: Orthodox
- Fighting out of: Curitiba, Brazil
- Team: Evolução Thai; Kings MMA (formerly); Chute Boxe Academy (formerly)
- Rank: purple belt in Brazilian Jiu-Jitsu under Cristiano Marcello
- Years active: 2004–2010 (MMA); 2006–2014 (kickboxing)

Kickboxing record
- Total: 6
- Wins: 2
- By knockout: 1
- Losses: 4

Mixed martial arts record
- Total: 11
- Wins: 6
- By knockout: 4
- By decision: 2
- Losses: 4
- By knockout: 2
- By submission: 1
- By decision: 1
- Draws: 1

Other information
- Mixed martial arts record from Sherdog

André "Dida" Schervinski Amado (born 9 October 1983) is a Brazilian mixed martial artist and Muay Thai kickboxer who has competed in the Japanese promotions Dream and K-1 Hero's.

He is known for his fighting style, often utilizing flying knees and spinning kicks. His ring entrances often sporting a mask and dancing his way to the ring. He is the head trainer of Evolução Thai.

== Career ==
Amado made his professional debut in 2004, and started off his career 3–0–1 in his home country of Brazil before making his Japanese debut against future DREAM Featherweight Champion Hiroyuki Takaya for the K-1 Hero's organization. Amado received his first career loss against fellow Brazilian Gesias Calvacante by an armbar submission in the final of the 2007 K-1 Hero's Lightweight Grand Prix Tournament. Calvacante had won the tournament in the previous year as well.

Until late 2007 Amado trained at the Chute Boxe Academy in Curitiba, Brazil and was able to gain a purple belt BJJ under coach Cristiano Marcello during his time there. Amado formerly competed in K-1 HERO'S and entered the DREAM Lightweight Grand Prix, losing in the opening round of the tournament to Eddie Alvarez by first round TKO. He lost his last fight to Katsunori Kikuno at Dream 10 on 20 July 2009. Amado most recently faced former EliteXC Lightweight Champion K. J. Noons at DREAM.13 at 22 March 2010. He lost via unanimous decision.

In March 2014, Dida announced his plans to make a comeback to both MMA and kickboxing. He re-signed with K-1 in May 2014. On 16 July 2018, it was announced that Amado had signed with Rizin Fighting Federation and was expected to fight at the classic New Year's Eve card, namely Rizin 14.

== Controversy ==
During the filming of The Ultimate Fighter: Brazil 3, Amado was brought in as one of the coaches under Wanderlei Silva. During the brawl that broke out between coaches Silva and Chael Sonnen, while the rest of the cast were trying to separate the brawling coaches, Amado joined in the crowd and took the chance to punch Sonnen on the back of the head several times and rip his shirt off. In the aftermath of the brawl, he was filmed bragging to his team about his deeds. UFC president Dana White kicked him off the show after the incident, telling the media that Amado "ought to be arrested" for what he did.

== Mixed martial arts record ==
Professional record breakdown
11 matches	6 wins	4 losses
By knockout	4	2
By submission	0	1
By decision	2	1
Draws	1	

Res.	Record	Opponent	Method	Event	Date	Round	Time	Location	Notes
Loss	6–4–1	K. J. Noons	Decision (unanimous)	DREAM.13	22 Mar 2010	2	5:00	Yokohama, Japan	
Loss	6–3–1	Katsunori Kikuno	TKO (punches)	DREAM.10	20 July 2009	1	3:47	Saitama, Saitama, Japan	
Loss	6–2–1	Eddie Alvarez	TKO (punches)	Dream 1: Lightweight Grand Prix 2008 First Round	15 March 2008	1	6:47	Saitama, Saitama, Japan	DREAM Lightweight Grand Prix opening round
Loss	6–1–1	Gesias Cavalcante	Submission (armbar)	Hero's 10	17 September 2007	1	4:48	Yokohama, Japan	Hero's 2007 Lightweight Grand Prix final.
Win	6–0–1	Caol Uno	Decision (unanimous)	Hero's 10	17 September 2007	3	5:00	Yokohama, Japan	Hero's 2007 Lightweight Grand Prix semi-final.
Win	5–0–1	Artur Oumakhanov	TKO (punches)	Hero's 9	16 July 2007	1	1:20	Yokohama, Japan	Hero's 2007 Lightweight Grand Prix quarter-final.
Win	4–0–1	Hiroyuki Takaya	TKO (broken nose)	Hero's 8	12 March 2007	1	3:29	Nagoya, Japan	
Win	3–0–1	Felipe Borges	TKO (punches)	Storm Samurai 12	25 November 2006	1	0:20	Curitiba, Brazil	
Draw	2–0–1	Claudio Mattos	Draw	Storm Samurai 8	2 July 2005	3	5:00	Brasílial, Brazil	
Win	2–0	Sergio Vieira	KO (punch)	Storm Samurai 6	19 March 2005	1	0:43	Curitiba, Brazil	
Win	1–0	Leandro Sousa	Decision	Storm Samurai 4	7 August 2004	3	5:00	Curitiba, Brazil	

== Kickboxing record ==
Kickboxing record
2 wins (1 (T)KOs), 4 losses
Date	Result	Opponent	Event	Location	Method	Round	Time
2014-10-11	Win	(China) Li Yankun	K-1 World MAX 2014 World Championship Tournament Final	Pattaya, Thailand	Decision (majority)	3	3:00
2010-11-08	Loss	(Japan) Hinata Watanabe	K-1 World MAX 2010 Final, Super Fight	Tokyo, Japan	Decision (unanimous)	3	3:00
2010-07-05	Loss	(Japan) Yuichiro Nagashima	K-1 World MAX 2010 Final 16 – Part 1	Tokyo, Japan	Decision (majority)	3	3:00
Fails to qualify for K-1 World MAX 2010 Final although he will be invited to take part in a super fight.
2009-04-21	Loss	(Thailand) Buakaw Por. Pramuk	K-1 World MAX 2009 Final 16	Fukuoka, Japan	Ext.R decision (unanimous)	4	3:00
Fails to qualify for K-1 World MAX 2009 Final 8.
2008-07-07	Win	(Lithuania) Remigijus Morkevičius	K-1 World MAX 2008 Final 8, Super Fight	Tokyo, Japan	TKO (3 knockdowns)	1	1:43
2006-02-09	Loss	(Japan) Hiroki Shishido	WSBA "Shoot Boxing 2006 Neo ΟΡΘΡΟΣ Series 1st"	Tokyo, Japan	Decision (unanimous)	5	3:00
Legend: Win Loss Draw/no contest Notes

== See also ==
- List of K-1 events
- List of male kickboxers
