= Tatsuya Mizuno =

Japanese kickboxer & mixed martial arts fighter (born 1981)

- Born: June 2, 1981 (age 45); Ibaraki, Japan
- Native name: 水野竜也
- Other names: Vicious
- Nationality: Japanese
- Height: 6 ft 1 in (1.85 m)
- Weight: 215 lb (98 kg; 15.4 st)
- Division: Heavyweight; Light Heavyweight Middleweight
- Team: Tribe Tokyo MMA; U-File Camp
- Rank: Third degree black belt in Judo
- Years active: 2006–2026

Mixed martial arts record
- Total: 44
- Wins: 27
- By knockout: 10
- By submission: 12
- By decision: 4
- By disqualification: 1
- Losses: 16
- By knockout: 10
- By submission: 3
- By decision: 3
- Draws: 1

Other information
- Mixed martial arts record from Sherdog

Tatsuya Mizuno (Japanese: 水野 竜也, Hepburn: Mizuno Tatsuya; born June 2, 1981) is a retired Japanese mixed martial artist. A professional competitor from 2006 to 2026, he has fought for DREAM, Pancrase, DEEP, M-1 Global, ProElite, ONE FC, K-1, and also participated in the Dynamite!! 2010 event.

== Background ==
Mizuno started competing in judo in high school, and currently holds a 3rd dan black belt in the discipline. On April 29, 2005, he became the champion of fifth Shooto East amateur mixed martial arts tournament, and on December 23, 2005, he took part in the U-FILE CAMP amateur tournament as member of Pankurasu geto.

On September 16, 2006, he defeated Yuji Sakuragi in his MMA debut at Pancrase: Blow 7. He fought against the likes Thiago Silva, Assuério Silva and Mirko Cro Cop early on in his career.

=== DREAM ===
In 2010 Mizuno took part in the DREAM Light Heavyweight Grand Prix. He defeated Melvin Manhoef at DREAM 15, in the Light Heavyweight Grand Prix semifinal. In the final he fought with Gegard Mousasi, and lost to him by rear-naked choke submission.

Mizuno fought Sergei Kharitonov at DREAM's Dynamite!! 2010 New Year's Eve event and lost the fight via first-round KO.

On July 16, 2011, Mizuno defeated Trevor Prangley by KO (knee to the body) in the first round at Dream: Japan GP Final. Former UFC Middleweight Yushin Okami was present as his cornerman.

=== Post-DREAM ===
On January 21, 2012, Mizuno defeated Ilima Maiava via submission (arm-triangle choke) in the second round.

In June 2012, Mizuno faced MMA veteran Renato Sobral at ONE Fighting Championship: Destiny of Warriors. Mizuno lost via armbar submission in 31 seconds of the first round.

He then faced fellow judoka Jason Jones at Glory 2: Brussels on October 6, 2012 in Brussels, Belgium. He lost the fight by unanimous decision.

Mizuno returned to the One FC promotion on October 18, 2013 against Rafael Silva. Mizuno won a three-round unanimous decision.

In Mizuno's next bout, he faced undefeated Brazilian Leandro Ataides at ONE Fighting Championship: Rise of Heroes on May 2, 2014. Mizuno was stopped by strikes at 0:47 of round one.

Mizuno faced Brayan Rafiq at ONE Fighting Championship: Battle of the Lions on November 7, 2014. He won the fight via unanimous decision.

Mizuno then faced João Batista Yoshimura at DEEP 98 on November 1, 2020. He lost the fight via second-round knockout.

Mizuno made his first title defense attempt in a rematch against Yoshimura at DEEP 102 on July 4, 2021. He lost the bout via second-round knockout.

Mizuno faced Seigo Mizuguchi on December 12, 2021 at DEEP 105 Impact, winning the bout in the first round after soccer kicking Mizuguchi.

Mizuno returned a year later to face Masashi Inada at DEEP 111 Impact on December 11, 2022, winning 19 seconds into the bout after dropping Inada with a knee and finishing him with ground and pound.

Mizuno faced Ryo Sakai for the interim Deep Super Heavyweight Championship on July 2, 2023 at DEEP 114 Impact, losing the bout in 42 seconds via TKO stoppage.

Mizuno retired on May 4, 2026 in a ceremony at DEEP 131 IMPACT: 25th Anniversary where he fought in an exhibition grappling match between Heavyweight MMA fighters Shoma Shibisai and Mikio Ueda.

== Championships and Accomplishments ==
- Deep
  - Deep Middleweight Championship (one time; former)
- DREAM
  - 2010 DREAM Light Heavyweight Grand Prix Runner Up

== Mixed martial arts record ==
Professional record breakdown
44 matches	27 wins	16 losses
By knockout	10	10
By submission	12	3
By decision	4	3
By disqualification	1	0
Draws	1	

Res.	Record	Opponent	Method	Event	Date	Round	Time	Location	Notes
Win	27–16–1	Masashi Inada	Submission (kimura)	DEEP 129 Impact	December 14, 2025	2	0:43	Tokyo, Japan	
Loss	26–16–1	Taisei Sekino	TKO (soccer kicks and punches)	Deep 121 Impact	September 16, 2024	1	3:12	Tokyo, Japan	
Win	26–15–1	Koji Shikuwa	Decision (unanimous)	DEEP 119 Impact	May 3, 2024	3	5:00	Tokyo, Japan	
Win	25–15–1	Lawdlain Saint Ilme	KO (knee)	DEEP Tokyo Impact 2023 6th Round	November 23, 2023	2	0:17	Tokyo, Japan	
Loss	24–15–1	Ryo Sakai	TKO (punches)	DEEP 114 Impact	July 2, 2023	1	0:42	Tokyo, Japan	For the interim DEEP Megatonweight Championship.
Win	24–14–1	Masashi Inada	TKO (knee and punches)	DEEP 111 Impact	December 11, 2022	1	0:19	Tokyo, Japan	
Win	23–14–1	Seigo Mizuguchi	TKO (punch and soccer kick)	DEEP 105 Impact	December 12, 2021	1	1:15	Tokyo, Japan	Super Heavyweight debut.
Loss	22–14–1	João Batista Yoshimura	KO (punches)	DEEP: 102 Impact	July 4, 2021	2	0:32	Tokyo, Japan	Lost the DEEP Middleweight Championship.
Loss	22–13–1	João Batista Yoshimura	TKO (punches)	DEEP: 98 Impact	November 1, 2020	2	4:40	Tokyo, Japan	
Win	22–12–1	Joshua Robison	Submission (rear naked choke)	DEEP 93 Impact	December 15, 2019	2	3:28	Tokyo, Japan	Light Heavyweight bout.
Win	21–12–1	Ryo Sakai	Disqualification	DEEP 92 Impact	October 22, 2019	2	3:41	Tokyo, Japan	Light Heavyweight bout.
Win	20–12–1	Mitsuyoshi Nakai	Submission (head and arm choke)	DEEP 90 Impact	June 29, 2019	1	4:58	Tokyo, Japan	
Win	19–12–1	Ryuta Sakurai	Submission (sleeper choke)	DEEP 87 Impact	December 22, 2018	2	2:53	Tokyo, Japan	
Win	18–12–1	Lee Eun-Su	Submission (rear naked choke)	Road FC 049	August 18, 2018	2	2:32	Seoul, South Korea	
Win	17–12–1	Taisuke Okuno	Submission (sleeper choke)	DEEP 82 Impact	February 24, 2018	3	4:34	Tokyo, Japan	Won the vacant Deep Middleweight Championship.
Win	16–12–1	Genpei Hayashi	Decision (unanimous)	DEEP 79 Impact	September 16, 2017	2	5:00	Tokyo, Japan	
Win	15–12–1	Jung Kyo Park	Submission (rear naked choke)	DEEP Cage Impact 2017	May 13, 2017	2	1:55	Tokyo, Japan	
Loss	14–12–1	Gilberto Galvao	Decision (unanimous)	ONE FC 47: Unbreakable Warriors	September 2, 2016	3	5:00	Kuala Lumpur, Malaysia	
Win	14–11–1	Mohamed Ali	TKO (knee and punches)	ONE FC 42: Ascent To Power	May 6, 2016	2	3:52	Kallang, Singapore	Catchweight (209 lbs) bout.
Loss	13–11–1	Jake Butler	TKO (elbows)	ONE FC 38: Clash of Heroes	January 29, 2016	1	4:38	Kuala Lumpur, Malaysia	Light Heavyweight bout.
Win	13–10–1	Jun Hee Moon	TKO (retirement)	DEEP 73 Impact	October 17, 2015	2	5:00	Tokyo, Japan	
Draw	12–10–1	Young Choi	Technical Draw	DEEP: Cage Impact 2015	July 20, 2015	1	5:00	Tokyo, Japan	
Win	12–10	Brayan Rafiq	Decision (unanimous)	ONE FC: Battle of the Lions	November 7, 2014	3	5:00	Kallang, Singapore	
Loss	11–10	Leandro Ataides	KO (punches)	ONE FC: Rise of Heroes	May 2, 2014	1	0:47	Pasay, Philippines	
Win	11–9	Rafael Silva	Decision (unanimous)	ONE FC: Total Domination	October 18, 2013	3	5:00	Kallang, Singapore	Middleweight debut.
Loss	10–9	Jason Jones	Decision (unanimous)	Glory World Series: Glory 2	October 12, 2012	3	5:00	Brussels, Belgium	
Loss	10–8	Renato Sobral	Submission (armbar)	ONE FC: Destiny of Warriors	June 24, 2012	1	0:31	Kuala Lumpur, Malaysia	
Win	10–7	Ilima Maiava	Submission (arm-triangle choke)	ProElite 3	January 21, 2012	2	1:47	Honolulu, Hawaii, United States	
Win	9–7	Trevor Prangley	TKO (knee to the body)	Dream: Japan GP Final	July 16, 2011	1	4:41	Tokyo, Japan	
Loss	8–7	Sergei Kharitonov	KO (knee)	Dynamite!! 2010	December 31, 2010	1	1:25	Saitama, Japan	Heavyweight debut.
Loss	8–6	Gegard Mousasi	Submission (rear-naked choke)	DREAM 16	September 25, 2010	1	6:10	Nagoya, Japan	DREAM Light Heavyweight GP Final; DREAM Light Heavyweight Championship.
Win	8–5	Melvin Manhoef	Submission (kimura)	DREAM 15	July 10, 2010	1	7:38	Saitama, Japan	DREAM Light Heavyweight GP Semifinal.
Win	7–5	Ilir Latifi	TKO (knee and punches)	K-1: Rumble of the Kings	November 20, 2009	3	0:15	Stockholm, Sweden	
Win	6–5	Rafael Rodríguez	Submission (rear-naked choke)	M-1 Challenge 18: Netherlands Day Two	August 16, 2009	1	2:20	Hilversum, Netherlands	
Loss	5–5	Tom Blackledge	Submission (rear-naked choke)	M-1 Challenge 14: Japan	April 29, 2009	1	3:22	Tokyo, Japan	
Win	5–4	Jose Beltran Martinez	TKO (punches)	M-1 Challenge 8: USA	October 29, 2008	1	1:53	Kansas City, Missouri, United States	
Loss	4–4	Bruno Carvalho	Decision (unanimous)	M-1 Challenge 6: Korea	August 29, 2008	2	5:00	South Korea	
Win	4–3	Yoshiyuki Nakanishi	KO (punches)	M-1 Challenge 5: Japan	July 17, 2008	1	4:13	Tokyo, Japan	
Loss	3–3	Mirko Cro Cop	TKO (punches)	DREAM 1: Lightweight Grand Prix 2008 First Round	March 15, 2008	1	0:56	Saitama, Saitama, Japan	
Win	3–2	Masayuki Kono	TKO (punches)	Pancrase: Rising 9	November 28, 2007	1	3:28	Tokyo, Japan	
Loss	2–2	Assuério Silva	TKO (punches)	Pancrase: Rising 5	May 30, 2007	2	2:08	Tokyo, Japan	For the vacant Pancrase Heavyweight Championship.
Loss	2–1	Thiago Silva	KO (soccer kick)	Pancrase: Rising 2	February 28, 2007	1	4:29	Tokyo, Japan	
Win	2–0	Yasuaki Miura	Technical Submission (kimura)	Pancrase: Blow 10	December 2, 2006	1	1:47	Tokyo, Japan	
Win	1–0	Yuji Sakuragi	Submission (rear-naked choke)	Pancrase: Blow 7	September 16, 2006	2	3:20	Tokyo, Japan	
