= 2009 in World Victory Road =

Mixed martial arts events

Information
- First date: January 4, 2009
- Last date: December 31, 2009

Events
- Total events: 9

Fights
- Total fights: 84
- Title fights: 4

Chronology
2008 in World Victory Road	2009 in World Victory Road	2010 in World Victory Road

The year 2009 was the 2nd year in the history of World Victory Road, a mixed martial arts promotion based in Japan. In 2009 World Victory Road held 9 events beginning with, World Victory Road Presents: Sengoku Rebellion 2009.

== Title fights ==
Title fights in 2009
Weight class				Method	Round	Time	Event	Notes
Lightweight	Satoru Kitaoka	def.	Takanori Gomi	Submission (Achilles Lock)	1	1:41	World Victory Road Presents: Sengoku no Ran 2009	(Note: For the Lightweight Championship.)
Middleweight	Jorge Santiago	def.	Kazuo Misaki	Technical Submission (Rear-Naked Choke)	5	3:26	World Victory Road Presents: Sengoku no Ran 2009	(Note: For the Middleweight Championship.)
Lightweight	Mizuto Hirota	def.	Satoru Kitaoka (c)	TKO (Knees)	4	2:50	World Victory Road Presents: Sengoku Gold Cup Semi-finals	(Note: For the Lightweight Championship.)
Featherweight	Masanori Kanehara	def.	Michihiro Omigawa	Decision (Split)	3	5:00	World Victory Road Presents: Sengoku 9	(Note: For the Featherweight Championship.)

== Events list ==
#	Event title	Date	Arena	Location
15	Dynamite!! The Power of Courage 2009	December 31, 2009	Saitama Super Arena	Saitama, Japan
14	World Victory Road Presents: Sengoku 11	November 7, 2009	Ryogoku Kokugikan	Tokyo, Japan
13	World Victory Road Presents: Sengoku 10	September 23, 2009	Saitama Super Arena	Saitama City, Japan
12	World Victory Road Presents: Sengoku 9	September 2, 2009	Saitama Super Arena	Saitama City, Japan
11	World Victory Road Presents: Sengoku Gold Cup Semi-finals	June 16, 2009	PS Lab	Yokohama, Japan
10	World Victory Road Presents: Sengoku 8	May 2, 2009	Yoyogi National Gymnasium	Tokyo, Japan
9	World Victory Road Presents: Sengoku 7	March 20, 2009	Yoyogi National Gymnasium	Tokyo, Japan
8	World Victory Road Presents: Gold Rush Korea	March 11, 2009	Team Maru Training Center	Seoul, South Korea
7	World Victory Road Presents: Sengoku no Ran 2009	January 4, 2009	Saitama Super Arena	Saitama City, Japan

== World Victory Road Presents: Sengoku no Ran 2009 ==
World Victory Road Presents: Sengoku no Ran 2009
- Promotion: World Victory Road
- Date: January 4, 2009
- Venue: Saitama Super Arena
- City: Saitama, Japan

Event chronology
World Victory Road Presents: Sengoku 6	World Victory Road Presents: Sengoku no Ran 2009	Gold Rush Korea

World Victory Road Presents: Sengoku no Ran 2009 was an event held on January 4, 2009 at the Saitama Super Arena in Saitama City, Japan.

=== Results ===
Main Card
Weight class				Method	Round	Time	Notes
Lightweight	Satoru Kitaoka	def.	Takanori Gomi	Submission (Achilles Lock)	1	1:41	(Note: For the Lightweight Championship.)
Middleweight	Jorge Santiago	def.	Kazuo Misaki	Technical Submission (Rear-Naked Choke)	5	3:26	(Note: For the Middleweight Championship.)
Light heavyweight	Sanae Kikuta	def.	Hidehiko Yoshida	Decision (Split)	3	5:00
Light heavyweight	Muhammed Lawal	def.	Yukiya Naito	TKO (Punches)	1	3:54
Heavyweight	Antonio Silva	def.	Yoshihiro Nakao	TKO (Knee Injury)	1	1:42
Lightweight	Eiji Mitsuoka	def.	Sergey Golyaev	Submission (Armbar)	1	4:22
Heavyweight	Mu Bae Choi	def.	Dave Herman	TKO (Punches)	2	2:22
Lightweight	Maximo Blanco	def.	Seigo Inoue	KO (Stomps)	1	0:38
Light heavyweight	Hidetada Irie	def.	Minoru Kato	TKO (Punches)	2	4:21

== World Victory Road Presents: Gold Rush Korea ==
World Victory Road Presents: Gold Rush Korea was an event held on March 11, 2009 at the team Maru Training Center in Seoul, South Korea.

=== Results ===
Main Card
Weight class				Method	Round	Time	Notes
	Ki Hyun Kim	def.	Jin Hyun Kim	TKO (Corner Stoppage)	1	4:58
	Nam Jin Jo	def.	Jae Hyun So	TKO (Punches)	2	2:06
	Woo Hyon Baek	def.	Cheol Hyun Park	Submission (Rear-Naked Choke)	1	1:13
	Ki Hyun Kim	def.	Seong Hyun Yoon	Submission (Armbar)	1	0:45
	Jin Hyun Kim	def.	Takayuki Kishi	TKO (Punches)	1	0:45
	Nam Jin Jo	def.	Shin Hyuk Kang	TKO (Punches)	1	0:29
	Jae Hyun So	def.	Gil Woo Lee	Submission (Rear-Naked Choke)	1	1:52

== World Victory Road Presents: Sengoku 7 ==
World Victory Road Presents: Sengoku 7 was an event held on March 20, 2009 at the Yoyogi National Gymnasium in Tokyo, Japan.

=== Results ===
Main Card
Weight class				Method	Round	Time	Notes
Light Heavyweight	Muhammed Lawal	def.	Ryo Kawamura	Decision (Unanimous)	3	5:00
Heavyweight	Jim York	def.	James Thompson	KO (Punch)	1	4:33
Featherweight Grandprix 1st Round
Featherweight	Hatsu Hioki	def.	Chris Manuel	Submission (Triangle Armbar)	1	4:12
Featherweight	Nam Phan	def.	Hideki Kadowaki	TKO (Punches)	1	3:09
Featherweight	Michihiro Omigawa	def.	L.C. Davis	Decision (Unanimous)	3	5:00
Featherweight	Marlon Sandro	def.	Matt Jaggers	Submission (Arm-Triangle Choke)	2	2:57
Featherweight	Masanori Kanehara	def.	Jong Man Kim	Decision (Unanimous)	3	5:00
Featherweight	Chan Sung Jung	def.	Shintaro Ishiwatari	Submission (Rear-Naked Choke)	1	4:29
Featherweight	Ronnie Mann	def.	Tetsuya Yamada	Decision (Unanimous)	3	5:00
Featherweight	Nick Denis	def.	Seiya Kawahara	TKO (Punches)	1	2:36

== World Victory Road Presents: Sengoku 8 ==
World Victory Road Presents: Sengoku 8 was an event held on May 2, 2009 at the Yoyogi National Gymnasium in Tokyo, Japan.

=== Results ===
Main Card
Weight class				Method	Round	Time	Notes
Featherweight	Hatsu Hioki	def.	Ronnie Mann	Submission (Triangle Choke)	1	3:09
Featherweight	Michihiro Omigawa	def.	Nam Phan	TKO (Punches)	1	4:52
Lightweight	Kazunori Yokota	def.	Leonardo Santos	Decision (Split)	3	5:00
Light heavyweight	Alexandre Ribeiro	def.	Keiichiro Yamamiya	KO (Punch)	3	0:51
Featherweight	Masanori Kanehara	def.	Chan Sung Jung	Decision (Unanimous)	3	5:00
Featherweight	Marlon Sandro	def.	Nick Denis	KO (Punches)	1	0:19
Welterweight	Makoto Takimoto	def.	Michael Costa	Submission (Heel Hook)	1	3:31
Light Heavyweight	Stanislav Nedkov	def.	Travis Wiuff	TKO (Punches)	3	0:42
Welterweight	Akihiko Mori	def.	Maximo Blanco	DQ (Illegal Soccer Kick)	1	4:20
Bantamweight	Shigeki Osawa	def.	Kota Ishibashi	Decision (Unanimous)	2	5:00
Lightweight	Hirotoshi Saito	def.	Yoshitaka Abe	Submission (Armbar)	1	2:52

== World Victory Road Presents: Sengoku Gold Cup Semi-finals ==
World Victory Road Presents: Sengoku Gold Cup Semi-finals was an event held on June 16, 2009 at PS Lab in Yokohama, Japan.

=== Results ===
Main Card
Weight class				Method	Round	Time	Notes
	Koji Ando	def.	Kohei Maruyama	TKO (Punch)	1	4:20

== World Victory Road Presents: Sengoku 9 ==
World Victory Road Presents: Sengoku 9 was an event held on September 2, 2009 at the Saitama Super Arena in Saitama City, Japan.

=== Results ===
Featherweight Grand Prix Final
Weight class				Method	Round	Time	Notes
Featherweight	Masanori Kanehara	def.	Michihiro Omigawa	Decision (Split)	3	5:00	(Note: For the Featherweight Championship.)
Non-Grand Prix bouts
Featherweight	Hatsu Hioki	def.	Masanori Kanehara	Decision (Unanimous)	3	5:00
Featherweight	Michihiro Omigawa	def.	Marlon Sandro	Decision (Split)	3	5:00
Featherweight Grand Prix reserve bout
Featherweight	Chan Sung Jung	def.	Matt Jaggers	Submission (Triangle Choke)	2	1:25
Non-Grand Prix bouts
Lightweight	Mizuto Hirota	def.	Satoru Kitaoka (c)	TKO (Knees)	4	2:50	(Note: For the Lightweight Championship.)
Middleweight	Kazuo Misaki	def.	Kazuhiro Nakamura	Technical Submission (Guillotine Choke)	1	3:03
Heavyweight	Blagoy Ivanov	def.	Kazuyuki Fujita	Decision (Split)	3	5:00
Welterweight	Dan Hornbuckle	def.	Akihiro Gono	KO (Head Kick)	3	2:50
Lightweight	Eiji Mitsuoka	def.	Clay French	Submission (Guillotine Choke)	1	1:51
Heavyweight	Yoshihiro Nakao	def.	Mu Bae Choi	Decision (Unanimous)	3	5:00
Sengoku Gold Cup finals
Featherweight	Shigeki Osawa	def.	Toru Harai	TKO (Punches)	1	4:24
Bantamweight	Ryosuke Komori	def.	Takeshi Numajiri	TKO (Punch)	1	3:25
Lightweight	Ikuo Usuda	def.	Koji Ando	Decision (Unanimous)	2	5:00

== World Victory Road Presents: Sengoku 10 ==
World Victory Road Presents: Sengoku 10 was an event held on September 23, 2009 at the Saitama Super Arena in Saitama City, Japan.

=== Results ===
Main Card
Weight class				Method	Round	Time	Notes
Light Heavyweight	Antz Nansen	def.	Hiroshi Izumi	TKO (Punches)	1	2:56
Heavyweight	Antonio Silva	def.	Jim York	Submission (Arm-Triangle Choke)	1	3:51
Welterweight	Makoto Takimoto	def.	Jae Sun Lee	Decision (Unanimous)	3	5:00	(Note: Judge Kenichi Serizawa scored the bout even at 30-30, but game a "must" to Takimoto.)
Lightweight	Kazunori Yokota	def.	Ryan Schultz	KO (Punch)	1	2:31
Light Heavyweight	Fábio Silva	def.	Ryo Kawamura	TKO (Corner Stoppage)	1	2:28
Welterweight	Dan Hornbuckle	def.	Nick Thompson	TKO (Punches)	2	1:30
Middleweight	Joe Doerksen	def.	Takenori Sato	TKO (Punches)	2	4:27
Lightweight	Maximo Blanco	def.	Tetsuya Yamada	TKO (Punches)	2	1:12
Gold Cup bouts
Lightweight	Ikuo Usuda	def.	Woo Hyon Baek	TKO (Punches)	1	4:59
Featherweight	Shigeki Osawa	def.	Ki Hyun Kim	Decision (Unanimous)	2	5:00
Bantamweight	Jae Hyun So	def.	Ryosuke Komori	Decision (Unanimous)	2	5:00	(Note: Judge Tenshin Matsumoto scored the bout for So, but his score was not announced.)

== World Victory Road Presents: Sengoku 11 ==
World Victory Road Presents: Sengoku 11 was an event held on November 7, 2009 at Ryogoku Kokugikan in Tokyo, Japan.

=== Results ===
Main Card
Weight class				Method	Round	Time	Notes
	Michihiro Omigawa	def.	Hatsu Hioki	Decision (Split)	3	5:00
	Mamed Khalidov	def.	Jorge Santiago	TKO (Punches)	1	1:45
	Jorge Masvidal	def.	Satoru Kitaoka	KO (Punches)	2	3:23
	Tomoaki Ueyama	def.	Hirokazu Konno	Technical Submission (Rear-Naked Choke)	1	4:29
	Kazunori Yokota	def.	Eiji Mitsuoka	Decision (Unanimous)	3	5:00
	Stanislav Nedkov	def.	Kevin Randleman	Decision (Split)	3	5:00
	Akihiro Gono	def.	Yoon Young Kim	Decision (Unanimous)	3	5:00
	Marlon Sandro	def.	Yuji Hoshino	KO (Punches)	1	2:33
	Dave Herman	def.	Jim York	KO (Axe Kicks)	1	2:25
	Ronnie Mann	def.	Shigeki Osawa	Decision (Unanimous)	3	5:00
	Ryota Uozumi	def.	Yuichiro Yajima	Submission (Armbar)	2	1:06

== Dynamite!! The Power of Courage 2009 ==
Dynamite!! The Power of Courage 2009 was a mixed martial arts and kickboxing event promoted by Fighting and Entertainment Group, was an event held on December 31, 2009 at the Saitama Super Arena in Saitama, Japan. The event included bouts that encompass the DREAM, Sengoku Raiden Championship, K-1, and K-1 World MAX banners. The event aired on HDNet in North America.

=== Results ===
DREAM Super Hulk Grand Prix 2009 Final
Weight class				Method	Round	Time	Notes
Super Heavyweight	Ikuhisa Minowa	def.	Rameau Thierry Sokoudjou	TKO (Punches)	3	3:29
Sengoku Raiden Championship Heavyweight bout
Heavyweight	Hidehiko Yoshida	def.	Satoshi Ishii	Decision (Unanimous)	3	5:00
DREAM Heavyweight bout
Heavyweight	Gegard Mousasi	def.	Gary Goodridge	TKO (Punches)	1	1:34
DREAM vs Sengoku Raiden Championship MMA bouts
Heavyweight	Hiroshi Izumi	def.	Katsuyori Shibata	Decision (Unanimous)	3	5:00
Featherweight	Michihiro Omigawa	def.	Hiroyuki Takaya	TKO (Punches)	1	2:54
Welterweight	Akihiro Gono	def.	Hayato Sakurai	Submission (Armbar)	2	3:56
Middleweight	Melvin Manhoef	def.	Kazuo Misaki	TKO (Punches)	1	1:49
Featherweight	Hideo Tokoro	def.	Jong Man Kim	Decision (Unanimous)	3	5:00
Lightweight	Tatsuya Kawajiri	def.	Kazunori Yokota	Decision (Unanimous)	3	5:00
Featherweight	Masanori Kanehara	def.	Norifumi Yamamoto	Decision (Unanimous)	3	5:00
Heavyweight	Alistair Overeem	def.	Kazuyuki Fujita	KO (Knee)	1	1:15
Lightweight	Shinya Aoki	def.	Mizuto Hirota	Technical Submission (Hammerlock)	1	1:17
K-1 card
K-1 MAX	Masato	def.	Andy Souwer	unanimous decision	5	3:00
K-1 Heavyweight	Ray Sefo	def.	Yosuke Nishijima	unanimous decision (3-0)	3	3:00
K-1 KOSHIEN 62 kg Class Tournament Final
K-1 KOSHIEN 62 kg	Masaaki Noiri	def.	Shota Shimada	unanimous decision (3-0)	3	2:00
K-1 KOSHIEN 62 kg Class Tournament Semi-finals
K-1 KOSHIEN 62 kg	Shota Shimada	def.	Katsuki Ishida	majority decision (2-0)	3	2:00
K-1 KOSHIEN 62 kg	Masaaki Noiri	def.	Hiroya	unanimous decision (3-0)	3	2:00
K-1 KOSHIEN 62 kg Class Tournament Reserve Fight
K-1 KOSHIEN 62 kg	Tsukasa Fuji	def.	Tatuya Kusakabe	majority decision (2-0)	3	2:00

== See also ==
- World Victory Road
