= 和徳 =

和徳 or 和德, meaning 'peace, virtue', may refer to:

- Hede, Chinese given name of Chinese Roman Catholic Bishop Cheng Hede
- Kazunori, a masculine Japanese given name

== See also ==
- Hede (disambiguation)
