= Kazunori Yokota =

Japanese judoka and mixed martial artist

- Born: April 3, 1978 (age 48); Funabashi, Chiba, Japan
- Height: 5 ft 8 in (1.73 m)
- Weight: 154 lb (70 kg; 11.0 st)
- Division: Lightweight; Featherweight
- Style: Judo, Shooto
- Stance: Orthodox
- Team: Team Grabaka
- Rank: Black belt in Judo
- Years active: 2004–2018

Mixed martial arts record
- Total: 38
- Wins: 26
- By knockout: 4
- By submission: 5
- By decision: 17
- Losses: 9
- By knockout: 3
- By submission: 2
- By decision: 4
- Draws: 3

Other information
- Spouse: Fabyola
- Children: 1
- Mixed martial arts record from Sherdog

Kazunori Yokota (横田 一則, Yokota Kazunori; born April 3, 1978) is a Japanese mixed martial artist and judoka. Yokota fought for the Japanese MMA promotions DEEP and WVR Sengoku.

== Career and background ==
Yokota has a background in Judo and fights for Team Grabaka with notable training partners such as Akihiro Gono and Kazuo Misaki. Yokota debuted MMA in GCM demolition in September 2004 where he faced off against Keita Nakamura, the 2 round fight resulted in a draw. After his first fight Yokota debuted the Japanese promotion DEEP and went undefeated in his next eight fights till he suffered his first loss by knockout at the hands of Tae Hyun Bang. His most famous fight was against former Sengoku 155 pound champion, Satoru Kitaoka, which he lost by unanimous decision. His next fight will be against Eiji Mitsuoka in Sengoku 11. On December 22, 2009, it was announced that Yokota would be taking on DREAM Lightweight Tatsuya Kawajiri in a Sengoku vs. DREAM fight at the annual Dynamite!! event on New Year's Eve in Saitama, Japan.

== Championships and accomplishments ==
- Deep
  - Deep Featherweight Championship (one time)
  - One Successful Title Defense
  - Deep Lightweight Championship (one time)
- Sengoku Raiden Championship
  - 2008 Sengoku Lightweight Grand Prix Runner Up

== Mixed martial arts record ==
Professional record breakdown
38 matches	26 wins	9 losses
By knockout	4	3
By submission	5	2
By decision	17	4
Draws	3	

Res.	Record	Opponent	Method	Event	Date	Round	Time	Location	Notes
Loss	26–9–3	Eiji Ishikawa	Decision (split)	Deep - 84 Impact: Differ Ariake Final Day	June 30, 2018	3	5:00	Tokyo, Japan	
Loss	26–8–3	Christian Lee	Submission (guillotine choke)	ONE Championship: Visions of Victory	March 9, 2018	2	4:34	Kuala Lumpur, Malaysia	
Win	26–7–3	Da Won Yoon	Decision (split)	Deep - 81 Impact	December 23, 2017	3	5:00	Tokyo, Japan	Return to Lightweight.
Loss	25–7–3	Martin Nguyen	KO (punch)	ONE Championship: Quest For Power	January 14, 2017	1	3:36	Jakarta, Indonesia	
Loss	25–6–3	Marat Gafurov	Submission (rear-naked choke)	ONE Championship: Kingdom of Champions	May 27, 2016	2	4:25	Bangkok, Thailand	For the ONE Featherweight Championship.
Win	25–5–3	Masakazu Imanari	Decision (unanimous)	Deep - 74 Impact	December 20, 2015	3	5:00	Tokyo, Japan	
Win	24–5–3	Kenjiro Takahashi	Decision (unanimous)	Deep - Cage Impact 2015	August 29, 2015	3	5:00	Tokyo, Japan	
Win	23–5–3	Juri Ohara	Decision (unanimous)	Deep - Funabashi Bom-Ba-Ye	May 8, 2015	2	10:00	Funabashi, Chiba, Japan	Lightweight bout.
Win	22–5–3	Isao Kobayashi	Decision (unanimous)	Deep - Dream Impact 2014: Omisoka Special	December 31, 2014	3	5:00	Saitama, Japan	
Win	21–5–3	Yusuke Kagiyama	Submission (kimura)	Deep: 68 Impact	August 23, 2014	1	2:38	Tokyo, Japan	
Win	20–5–3	Katsunori Tsuda	Decision (unanimous)	Deep: 66 Impact	April 29, 2014	3	5:00	Tokyo, Japan	Defended Deep Featherweight Championship.
Win	19–5–3	Doo Ri Song	TKO (punches)	Deep: Cage Impact 2013	November 24, 2013	2	4:00	Tokyo, Japan	
Win	18–5–3	Woon Gyeom Kim	Submission (armlock)	Deep Cage Impact 2013: Korakuen Hall	June 15, 2013	1	4:02	Tokyo, Japan	
Win	17–5–3	Shoji Maruyama	Decision (unanimous)	Deep: 61 Impact	February 16, 2013	3	5:00	Tokyo, Japan	
Win	16–5–3	Anatoly Safronov	Submission (rear-naked choke)	Abu Dhabi Warriors 1	November 2, 2012	3	4:07	Abu Dhabi, UAE	
Win	15–5–3	Hideki Kadowaki	Decision (unanimous)	Deep - 57 Impact	February 18, 2012	3	5:00	Tokyo, Japan	Won vacant Deep Featherweight Championship.
Win	14–5–3	Katsuya Toida	TKO (soccer kicks and punches)	Deep: Cage Impact 2011 in Tokyo, 1st Round	October 29, 2011	2	0:25	Tokyo, Japan	
Win	13–5–3	Shoji Maruyama	Decision (unanimous)	Deep: 54 Impact	June 24, 2011	3	5:00	Tokyo, Japan	Featherweight debut.
Loss	12–5–3	Jadamba Narantungalag	KO (punch)	World Victory Road Presents: Soul of Fight	December 30, 2010	1	2:03	Tokyo, Japan	
Loss	12–4–3	Brian Cobb	Decision (split)	World Victory Road Presents: Sengoku Raiden Championships 15	October 30, 2010	3	5:00	Tokyo, Japan	Cobb came in heavy at 161.3lbs & 157.2 lbs on his second try.
Loss	12–3–3	Tatsuya Kawajiri	Decision (unanimous)	Dynamite!! The Power of Courage 2009	December 31, 2009	3	5:00	Saitama, Japan	
Win	12–2–3	Eiji Mitsuoka	Decision (unanimous)	World Victory Road Presents: Sengoku 11	November 7, 2009	3	5:00	Tokyo, Japan	
Win	11–2–3	Ryan Schultz	KO (punch)	World Victory Road Presents: Sengoku 10	September 23, 2009	1	2:31	Saitama, Japan	
Win	10–2–3	Leonardo Santos	Decision (split)	World Victory Road Presents: Sengoku 8	May 2, 2009	3	5:00	Saitama, Japan	
Loss	9–2–3	Satoru Kitaoka	Decision (unanimous)	World Victory Road Presents: Sengoku 6	November 1, 2008	3	5:00	Saitama, Japan	Sengoku Lightweight Grand Prix Final.
Win	9–1–3	Mizuto Hirota	Decision (unanimous)	World Victory Road Presents: Sengoku 6	November 1, 2008	3	5:00	Saitama, Japan	Sengoku Lightweight Grand Prix Semifinal.
Win	8–1–3	Bojan Kosednar	Decision (unanimous)	World Victory Road Presents: Sengoku 4	August 24, 2008	3	5:00	Saitama, Japan	Sengoku Lightweight Grand Prix Quarterfinal.
Loss	7–1–3	Tae Hyun Bang	KO (punches)	Deep: 35 Impact	May 19, 2008	1	3:38	Tokyo, Japan	Lost Deep Lightweight Championship.
Win	7–0–3	Minoru Tavares Tsuchiya	Submission (armbar)	Deep: 31 Impact	August 5, 2007	1	3:53	Tokyo, Japan	
Win	6–0–3	Nobuhiro Obiya	Decision (unanimous)	Deep: 28 Impact	February 16, 2007	3	5:00	Tokyo, Japan	Won Deep Lightweight Championship.
Win	5–0–3	Yoshihiro Tomioka	Decision (majority)	Deep: 27 Impact	December 20, 2006	2	5:00	Tokyo, Japan	
Win	4–0–3	Michihiro Omigawa	Decision (majority)	Deep: 26 Impact	October 10, 2006	3	5:00	Tokyo, Japan	
Draw	3–0–3	Milton Vieira	Draw	Deep: 24 Impact	April 11, 2006	2	5:00	Tokyo, Japan	
Win	3–0–2	Kosuto Umeda	TKO (punches)	Deep: 23 Impact	February 5, 2006	2	4:05	Tokyo, Japan	
Draw	2–0–2	Yoshihiro Tomioka	Draw	Deep: clubDeep Toyama: Barbarian Festival 3	October 30, 2005	2	5:00	Toyama, Japan	
Win	2–0–1	Hiroki Nagaoka	Decision (unanimous)	Deep: 20th Impact	September 9, 2005	2	5:00	Tokyo, Japan	
Win	1–0–1	Daigo Ishijima	Technical Submission (armbar)	Pancrase: Spiral 5	July 10, 2005	1	4:41	Yokohama, Japan	
Draw	0–0–1	Keita Nakamura	Draw	GCM - Demolition 040919	September 19, 2004	2	5:00	Tokyo, Japan	

== See also ==
- List of current mixed martial arts champions
- List of male mixed martial artists
