= Rodrigo Damm =

Brazilian mixed martial arts fighter

- Born: 3 February 1980 (age 46); Afonso Cláudio, Brazil
- Height: 5 ft 7 in (1.70 m)
- Weight: 170 lb (77 kg; 12 st)
- Division: Welterweight; Lightweight; Featherweight
- Reach: 71.0 in (180 cm)
- Stance: Orthodox
- Fighting out of: São Paulo, Brazil
- Team: X-Gym; Team Damm; Alliance Jiu-Jitsu
- Rank: 3rd degree black belt in Brazilian Jiu-Jitsu
- Wrestling: Former member of the Brazilian National Wrestling team
- Years active: 2004–2015 (MMA)

Mixed martial arts record
- Total: 21
- Wins: 12
- By knockout: 2
- By submission: 6
- By decision: 4
- Losses: 9
- By knockout: 4
- By submission: 1
- By decision: 4

Other information
- Mixed martial arts record from Sherdog

Rodrigo Damm (Portuguese pronunciation: [ʁoˈdɾiɡu ˈdɐ̃]; born 3 February 1980) is a Brazilian retired professional mixed martial artist who last competed in the Lightweight division of the UFC. A professional since 2004, he also competed for World Victory Road, Strikeforce, Jungle Fight, Shooto, and was a competitor on The Ultimate Fighter: Brazil.

== Background ==
Damm began training in Brazilian jiu-jitsu when he was 16 years old, and also competed in wrestling. He is a seven-time national champion in both sports as well as a world champion in Brazilian jiu-jitsu.

== Mixed martial arts career ==
=== Early career ===
Damm made his professional mixed martial arts debut in October 2004, losing via split decision to Luciano Azevedo. In the years following that loss, he went on an 8 fight win streak while fighting all over the world including Japan, Russia and South Korea.

=== Strikeforce ===
Damm made his United States MMA debut at Strikeforce: Shamrock vs. Diaz against Gilbert Melendez for the Strikeforce Interim Lightweight Championship.

Damm returned to the promotion in 2011, where he faced Justin Wilcox in the main event at Strikeforce Challengers: Wilcox vs. Damm. He lost the fight via doctor stoppage between the first and second round due to a cut.

=== The Ultimate Fighter ===
In March 2012, Damm appeared as a fighter on The Ultimate Fighter: Brazil. In the opening elimination fight, he defeated Fabrício Guerreiro by submission (rear naked choke) in round 2 to get into the TUF house.

Damm was selected fourth (eighth overall) by Vitor Belfort to be a part of Team Vitor. During the show, Damm often came to blows with Anistavio "Gasparzinho" Medeiros, as Gasparzinho's prankster attitude constantly annoyed the more serious Damm. In the quarterfinals, Damm was matched up against undefeated John Teixeira. After three closely contested rounds, Damm won via split decision.

=== Ultimate Fighting Championship ===
Damm made his UFC debut at UFC 147 on 23 June 2012 where he faced his rival from the TUF, Gasparzinho. He won the fight via submission in the first round, earning a Submission of the Night bonus in the process.

Damm fought Antonio Carvalho on 17 November 2012 at UFC 154. Damm lost a back and forth fight via split decision.

Damm next fought Mizuto Hirota at UFC on Fuel TV 10 on 8 June 2013. He won the back-and-forth fight via split decision.

Damm was expected to face Hacran Dias at UFC Fight Night 29. However, the bout was scrapped just days prior to the event after Damm was sidelined due to a kidney stone attack.

Damm moved back to Lightweight and faced Ivan Jorge on 15 February 2014 at UFC Fight Night 36. He won the fight via unanimous decision.

Damm faced Rashid Magomedov on 31 May 2014 at The Ultimate Fighter Brazil 3 Finale He lost the fight via unanimous decision.

Damm faced Al Iaquinta at UFC Fight Night 50 on 5 September 2014. Iaquinta defeated Damm via third-round TKO.

Damm faced Evan Dunham on 3 January 2015 at UFC 182. He lost the fight by unanimous decision and was subsequently released from the promotion.

Following his release, Damm posted this statement to social media.

"I stopped, retired from MMA. I'm not training hard enough for quite some time. I go to my BJJ gym two or three times a week, when I can. I keep training but for my own pleasure. I'm enjoying my family. I spent a lot of time away from home and traveling, now I can watch my kids grow up. I think I'm gonna start doing business with my dad at his woodshop. This should be my future"

== Personal life ==
Rodrigo's sister Carina Damm is also a mixed martial artist.

== Championships and accomplishments ==
=== Mixed martial arts ===
- Ultimate Fighting Championship
  - Submission of the Night (One time) vs. Anistavio Medeiros

== Mixed martial arts record ==
Professional record breakdown
21 matches	12 wins	9 losses
By knockout	2	4
By submission	6	1
By decision	4	4

Res.	Record	Opponent	Method	Event	Date	Round	Time	Location	Notes
Loss	12–9	Evan Dunham	Decision (unanimous)	UFC 182	3 January 2015	3	5:00	Las Vegas, Nevada, United States	
Loss	12–8	Al Iaquinta	TKO (punches and elbows)	UFC Fight Night: Jacare vs. Mousasi	5 September 2014	3	2:26	Mashantucket, Connecticut, United States	
Loss	12–7	Rashid Magomedov	Decision (unanimous)	The Ultimate Fighter Brazil 3 Finale: Miocic vs. Maldonado	31 May 2014	3	5:00	São Paulo, Brazil	
Win	12–6	Ivan Jorge	Decision (unanimous)	UFC Fight Night: Machida vs. Mousasi	15 February 2014	3	5:00	Jaraguá do Sul, Brazil	Return to Lightweight.
Win	11–6	Mizuto Hirota	Decision (split)	UFC on Fuel TV: Nogueira vs. Werdum	8 June 2013	3	5:00	Fortaleza, Brazil	
Loss	10–6	Antonio Carvalho	Decision (split)	UFC 154	17 November 2012	3	5:00	Montreal, Quebec, Canada	
Win	10–5	Anistavio Medeiros	Submission (rear-naked choke)	UFC 147	23 June 2012	1	2:12	Belo Horizonte, Brazil	Featherweight debut. Submission of the Night.
Loss	9–5	Justin Wilcox	TKO (doctor stoppage)	Strikeforce Challengers: Wilcox vs. Damm	1 April 2011	1	5:00	Stockton, California, United States	
Loss	9–4	Maximo Blanco	TKO (punches)	World Victory Road Presents: Sengoku Raiden Championships 13	20 June 2010	2	0:45	Tokyo, Japan	
Win	9–3	Ivan Iberico	Decision (unanimous)	Jungle Fight 17: Vila Velha	27 February 2010	3	5:00	Vila Velha, Brazil	
Loss	8–3	Gilbert Melendez	KO (punches)	Strikeforce: Shamrock vs. Diaz	11 April 2009	2	2:02	San Jose, California, United States	For Strikeforce Interim Lightweight Championship.
Loss	8–2	Eiji Mitsuoka	Submission (rear-naked choke)	World Victory Road Presents: Sengoku 4	24 August 2008	1	3:13	Saitama, Japan	
Win	8–1	Jorge Masvidal	TKO (punch)	World Victory Road Presents: Sengoku 3	8 June 2008	2	4:38	Saitama, Japan	
Win	7–1	Johil de Oliveira	Decision	Universidade Fight Show 1	7 October 2007	3	5:00	Espírito Santo, Brazil	
Win	6–1	Ryan Bow	KO (punches)	BodogFIGHT: Vancouver	24 August 2007	2	1:03	Vancouver, British Columbia, Canada	
Win	5–1	Santino DeFranco	Submission (rear-naked choke)	BodogFIGHT Series II: Clash of the Nations	14 April 2007	2	1:58	Saint Petersburg, Russia	
Win	4–1	Kultar Gill	Submission (rear-naked choke)	BodogFIGHT: Clash of the Nations I	16 December 2006	2	2:11	Saint Petersburg, Russia	
Win	3–1	Naoki Seki	Submission (armbar)	MARS 4: New Deal	26 August 2006	1	1:48	Tokyo, Japan	
Win	2–1	Jyu Do Fan	Submission (rear-naked choke)	MARS Attack 1	21 July 2006	1	3:56	Seoul, South Korea	
Win	1–1	Luciano Silva	Submission (rear-naked choke)	Night of Fight 1	23 July 2005	1	1:26	Vila Velha, Brazil	
Loss	0–1	Luciano Azevedo	Decision (split)	Shooto Brazil: Never Shake	23 October 2004	2	5:00	São Paulo, Brazil	

=== Mixed martial arts exhibition record ===
Exhibition record breakdown		
2 matches	2 wins	0 losses
By submission	1	0
By decision	1	0

Res.	Record	Opponent	Method	Event	Date	Round	Time	Location	Notes
Win	2–0	John Macapá	Decision (split)	The Ultimate Fighter: Brazil		3	5:00	Brazil	TUF Brazil Quarter-finals bout.
Win	1–0	Fabrício Guerreiro	Submission (rear-naked choke)	The Ultimate Fighter: Brazil		2	N/A	Brazil	TUF Brazil elimination bout.
