= World Victory Road Presents: Sengoku 10 =

Mixed martial arts event

- The poster for World Victory Road Presents: Sengoku 10
- Promotion: World Victory Road
- Date: September 23, 2009
- Venue: Saitama Community Center
- City: Saitama, Japan
- Attendance: 7,456

Event chronology
World Victory Road Presents: Sengoku 9	World Victory Road Presents: Sengoku 10	World Victory Road Presents: Sengoku 11

World Victory Road Presents: Sengoku 10 was a mixed martial arts event promoted by World Victory Road on September 23, 2009. The event included three Gold Cup matches featuring the winners of Sengoku: Gold Cup South Korea versus the winners of Sengoku: Gold Cup Japan. It was broadcast live in North America on HDNet.

== Results ==
Main card
Weight class				Method	Round	Time	Notes
Light Heavyweight	Antz Nansen	def.	Hiroshi Izumi	TKO (punches)	1	2:56
Heavyweight	Antônio Silva	def.	Jim Yorke	Submission (arm-triangle choke)	1	3:51
Welterweight	Makoto Takimoto	def.	Jae Sun Lee	Decision (unanimous) (30-30, 30-28, 30-29)	3	5:00	(Note: Judge Kenichi Serizawa scored the bout even at 30-30, but game a "must" to Takimoto.)
Lightweight	Kazunori Yokota	def.	Ryan Schultz	KO (punch)	1	2:31
Light Heavyweight	Fábio Silva	def.	Ryo Kawamura	TKO (corner stoppage)	1	2:28
Welterweight	Dan Hornbuckle	def.	Nick Thompson	TKO (punches)	2	1:30
Middleweight	Joe Doerksen	def.	Takenori Sato	TKO (punches)	2	4:27
Lightweight	Maximo Blanco	def.	Tetsuya Yamada	TKO (punches)	2	1:12
Gold Cup bouts
Weight class				Method	Round	Time	Notes
Lightweight	Ikuo Usuda	def.	Woo Hyon Baek	TKO (punches)	1	4:59
Featherweight	Shigeki Osawa	def.	Ki Hyun Kim	Decision (unanimous) (20-19, 20-19, 20-18)	2	5:00
Bantamweight	Jae Hyun So	def.	Ryosuke Komori	Decision (unanimous) (20-18, 20-17)	2	5:00	(Note: Judge Tenshin Matsumoto scored the bout for So, but his score was not announced.)

== See also ==
- World Victory Road
- List of Sengoku champions
- 2009 in World Victory Road
