= Kim Gi-hyeon (disambiguation) =

Kim Gi-hyeon or Kim Ki-hyon (Korean: 김기현) may refer to:

- Kim Ki-hyeon (born 1945), South Korean actor
- Kim Gi-hyeon (born 1959), South Korean politician
- Ki Hyun Kim (born 1991), South Korean mixed martial artist
