= Marlon Sandro =

Brazilian mixed martial arts fighter

- Born: 8 March 1977 (age 49); Rio de Janeiro, Brazil
- Other names: The Gladiator
- Height: 1.73 m (5 ft 8 in)
- Weight: 145 lb (66 kg; 10.4 st)
- Division: Featherweight
- Reach: 67 in (170 cm)
- Fighting out of: Curitiba, Brazil
- Team: Nova União (former)
- Rank: Second degree Black belt in Brazilian Jiu-Jitsu
- Years active: 2006–2017

Mixed martial arts record
- Total: 38
- Wins: 29
- By knockout: 9
- By submission: 8
- By decision: 12
- Losses: 7
- By knockout: 2
- By decision: 5
- Draws: 2

Other information
- Mixed martial arts record from Sherdog

Marlon Sandro (born 8 March 1977) is a retired Brazilian mixed martial artist. He has competed for Bellator, Pancrase, Shooto, and World Victory Road. He is the former King of Pancrase Featherweight Champion and former Sengoku Featherweight Champion.

== Background ==
Sandro is from Morro de Santo Amaro, a famous slum in Rio de Janeiro, Brazil. Growing up poor, Sandro worked several jobs as a teenager. Before being introduced to Brazilian jiu-jitsu, Sandro had trained in Capoeira and also competed in surfing.

== Mixed martial arts career ==
=== Early career ===
Sandro made his professional MMA debut in November 2004. He fought primarily in his native Brazil, amassing an undefeated streak of 12–0 before debuting for the World Victory Road Presents: Sengoku promotion.

=== King of Pancrase ===
Sandro made his Pancrase debut at Pancrase Rising 9 against Daiki Hata. He won by unanimous decision.

Sandro next fought Miki Shida at Pancrase: Shining 2. He won by KO.

In his next fight Sandro fought for the vacant King of Pancrase Featherweight Championship against Masaya Takita. He won via unanimous decision.

=== Sengoku ===
Sandro participated in World Victory Road's Sengoku Featherweight Championship Tournament, losing by a "must decide" decision in the semi-finals to judo specialist and former UFC veteran Michihiro Omigawa. Scores were 30–30, 30–30, 30–29 Sandro (i.e. majority draw) but the judges with draws selected Omigawa in a "must decide" decision, giving him the "must decide split decision" 2–1.

His challenged Sengoku Featherweight Champion, Masanori Kanehara at World Victory Road Presents: Sengoku 13. Sandro won via KO 38 seconds into the first round. Kanehara was sent out of the ring in a stretcher. After the fight Sandro was ranked the No. 5 Featherweight in the world by Sherdog. On a side note, Marlon weighted 166 lbs one week before the fight.

Sandro lost the Sengoku Featherweight Championship to Hatsu Hioki at World Victory Road Presents: Soul of Fight on 30 December 2010, by unanimous decision (49–47, 48–47, 48–47). Hioki dominated nearly every round of the fight, and Sandro was given a yellow card in the first round. Sandro was nearly submitted several times in the final round by a chicken wing armlock, then by an armbar.

=== Bellator Fighting Championships ===
On 23 February, it was announced Sandro had signed a multi-fight deal with Bellator Fighting Championships, and will be competing in their Season Four Tournament fights. Sandro made his debut with the promotion at Bellator 46 against Genair da Silva in his quarterfinal match of the Bellator Fighting Championships: 2011 Summer Series Featherweight Tournament. While a seemingly clear-cut decision win, Sandro won the fight on only two scorecards (via 30–27 and 29–28 scores). A third judge scored the bout 29–28 for da Silva, which resulted in a split decision victory for Sandro.

Sandro faced Nazareno Malegarie in the semifinals at Bellator 47. He dominated Malegarie, and won the fight via unanimous decision.

Sandro fought Pat Curran at Bellator 48 in the finals of the tournament. After controlling the fight with his superior striking, Sandro lost via head kick KO late in the second round.

Sandro rebounded from the first KO loss of his career by submitting fellow Brazilian Rafael Dias in the first round at Bellator 58.

In March 2012, Sandro entered the Bellator Season Six Featherweight Tournament, where he defeated Roberto Vargas by submission in the first round. In the semifinals at Bellator 64, Sandro defeated Alexandre Bezerra via split decision. Sandro faced Daniel Mason-Straus in the tournament finals at Bellator 68. He lost the fight via unanimous decision.

Sandro faced TUF 14 contestant Dustin Neace on 16 November 2012, at Bellator 81. Sandro won the fight via technical submission due to a rear-naked choke in the first round.

Sandro then participated in the Bellator Season Eight Featherweight Tournament at Bellator 88 on 7 February 2013, he faced Akop Stepanyan in the quarterfinal round. Sandro won the fight via majority decision. In the semifinal, Sandro faced Magomedrasul Khasbulaev at Bellator 92 and lost via third-round TKO.

=== Return To Pancrase ===
After a five-year absence, the former King of Pancrase Featherweight Champion returns at Pancrase 252: 20th Anniversary. Sandro took on Yojiro Uchimura. The fight went to a draw.

Next Sandro fought the current King of Pancrase Lightweight Champion in a Featherweight bout in the main event of Pancrase 266, but came up short losing by split decision.

=== Bellator return ===
On 9 May 2014, over a year since his last fight in Bellator, Sandro faced Chris Horodecki at Bellator 119 in Ontario, Canada. He won the fight via unanimous decision.

Following the victory in his Bellator return, he had a mix of wins, losses, and even a draw in the following years. In 2015, Sandro faced Isao Kobayashi in Pancrase 266, where he pulled off a victory in a split decision. Later in the year, he had a match with Soo Chul Kim in Road FC 025, which ended in a unanimous draw. Despite this setback, Sandro bounced back with a win against Wanderson Michel in November 2015 during Shooto Brasil 59: Bahia. The victory was marked by a submission due to Michel's shoulder injury.

In 2016, Sandro experienced a significant loss against Mu Gyeom Choi via unanimous decision at Road FC 029, a fight that was for the ROAD FC Featherweight Championship. Despite this loss, Sandro finished the year on a positive note, defeating Koyomi Matsushima by TKO in Pancrase 283.

Sandro's winning streak continued into 2017, where he beat Diego Arturo Huerto Jauregui with an arm-triangle choke submission in Shooto Brazil 74. After this fight, Sandro's career was put on hold due to legal troubles; he was imprisoned due to domestic violence charges against his then-fiance. This led to a lengthy hiatus from his MMA career.

After serving a six- layoff, Sandro made a remarkable comeback to the ring in April 2023. Despite being 46 years old, he faced Alexandre Castro in Shooto Brazil 117 and won the bout, knocking out Castro with a front kick in the first round. This victory marked a significant moment in Sandro's career, signaling his return to MMA after overcoming personal and legal challenges.

== Championships and accomplishments ==
- Bellator Fighting Championships
  - Bellator 2011 Summer Series Featherweight Tournament Runner-up
  - Bellator Season Six Featherweight Tournament Runner-up
- World Victory Road
  - Sengoku Featherweight Championship (One time)
  - Sengoku 2009 Featherweight Grand Prix Semifinalist
- Pancrase
  - King of Pancrase Featherweight Champion (One time)
- Arena Combat Cup
  - ACC 1 Featherweight Tournament Winner
- Sherdog
  - 2010 All-Violence 1st Team

== Mixed martial arts record ==
Professional record breakdown
38 matches	29 wins	7 losses
By knockout	10	2
By submission	7	0
By decision	12	5
Draws	2	

Res.	Record	Opponent	Method	Event	Date	Round	Time	Location	Notes
Win	29–7–2	Alexandre Castro	KO	Shooto Brasil 117	28 April 2023	1	2:38	Rio de Janeiro, Brazil	
Win	28–7–2	Diego Arturo Huerto Jauregui	Submission (arm-triangle choke)	Shooto Brazil 74	27 August 2017	1	1:56	Rio de Janeiro, Brazil	
Win	27–7–2	Koyomi Matsushima	TKO (elbows and punches)	Pancrase 283	18 December 2016	1	2:51	Tokyo, Japan	
Loss	26–7–2	Mu Gyeom Choi	Decision (unanimous)	Road FC 029	12 March 2016	3	5:00	Wonju, South Korea	For the ROAD FC Featherweight Championship.
Win	26–6–2	Wanderson Michel	TKO (punches)	Shooto Brasil 59: Bahia	13 November 2015	1	1:19	Bahia, Brazil	
Draw	25–6–2	Soo Chul Kim	Draw (unanimous)	Road FC 025	22 August 2015	3	5:00	Wonju, South Korea	
Loss	25–6–1	Isao Kobayashi	Decision (split)	Pancrase 266	26 April 2015	3	5:00	Tokyo, Japan	
Win	25–5–1	Chris Horodecki	Decision (unanimous)	Bellator 119	9 May 2014	3	5:00	Rama, Ontario Canada	
Draw	24–5–1	Yojiro Uchimura	Draw (unanimous)	Pancrase 252: 20th Anniversary	29 September 2013	3	5:00	Yokohama, Kanagawa, Japan	
Loss	24–5	Magomedrasul Khasbulaev	TKO (punches)	Bellator 92	7 March 2013	3	2:38	Temecula, California, United States	Bellator Season Eight Featherweight Tournament Semifinal
Win	24–4	Akop Stepanyan	Decision (majority)	Bellator 88	7 February 2013	3	5:00	Duluth, Georgia, United States	Bellator Season Eight Featherweight Tournament Quarterfinal.
Win	23–4	Dustin Neace	Technical Submission (rear-naked choke)	Bellator 81	16 November 2012	1	2:05	Kingston, Rhode Island, United States	
Loss	22–4	Daniel Mason-Straus	Decision (unanimous)	Bellator 68	11 May 2012	3	5:00	Atlantic City, New Jersey, United States	Bellator Season Six Featherweight Tournament Final.
Win	22–3	Alexandre Bezerra	Decision (split)	Bellator 64	6 April 2012	3	5:00	Windsor, Ontario, Canada	Bellator Season Six Featherweight Tournament Semifinal.
Win	21–3	Roberto Vargas	Submission (rear-naked choke)	Bellator 60	9 March 2012	1	3:35	Hammond, Indiana, United States	Bellator Season Six Featherweight Tournament Quarterfinal.
Win	20–3	Rafael Dias	Submission (arm triangle choke)	Bellator 58	19 November 2011	1	3:56	Hollywood, Florida, United States	
Loss	19–3	Pat Curran	KO (head kick and punches)	Bellator 48	20 August 2011	2	4:00	Uncasville, Connecticut, United States	Bellator 2011 Summer Series Featherweight Tournament Final.
Win	19–2	Nazareno Malegarie	Decision (unanimous)	Bellator 47	23 July 2011	3	5:00	Rama, Ontario, Canada	Bellator 2011 Summer Series Featherweight Tournament Semifinal.
Win	18–2	Genair da Silva	Decision (split)	Bellator 46	25 June 2011	3	5:00	Hollywood, Florida, United States	Bellator 2011 Summer Series Featherweight Tournament Quarterfinal.
Loss	17–2	Hatsu Hioki	Decision (unanimous)	World Victory Road Presents: Soul of Fight	30 December 2010	5	5:00	Koto, Tokyo, Japan	Lost the Sengoku Featherweight Championship.
Win	17–1	Masanori Kanehara	KO (punch)	World Victory Road Presents: Sengoku Raiden Championships 13	20 June 2010	1	0:38	Sumida, Tokyo, Japan	Won the Sengoku Featherweight Championship.
Win	16–1	Tomonari Kanomata	KO (punch)	World Victory Road Presents: Sengoku Raiden Championships 12	7 March 2010	1	0:09	Sumida, Tokyo, Japan	
Win	15–1	Yuji Hoshino	KO (punches)	World Victory Road Presents: Sengoku 11	7 November 2009	1	2:33	Sumida, Tokyo, Japan	
Loss	14–1	Michihiro Omigawa	Decision (split)	World Victory Road Presents: Sengoku 9	2 August 2009	3	5:00	Saitama, Saitama, Japan	Sengoku 2009 Featherweight Grand Prix Semifinal; Originally a majority draw.
Win	14–0	Nick Denis	KO (punches)	World Victory Road Presents: Sengoku 8	2 May 2009	1	0:19	Shibuya, Tokyo, Japan	Sengoku 2009 Featherweight Grand Prix Quarterfinal.
Win	13–0	Matt Jaggers	Submission (standing arm-triangle choke)	World Victory Road Presents: Sengoku 7	20 March 2009	2	2:57	Shibuya, Tokyo, Japan	Sengoku 2009 Featherweight Grand Prix Opening Round.
Win	12–0	Masaya Takita	Decision (unanimous)	Pancrase: Shining 9	26 October 2008	3	5:00	Koto, Tokyo, Japan	Won the vacant Pancrase Featherweight Championship.
Win	11–0	Miki Shida	KO (flying knee and punches)	Pancrase: Shining 2	26 March 2008	2	4:19	Bunkyo, Tokyo, Japan	
Win	10–0	Daiki Hata	Decision (unanimous)	Pancrase: Rising 9	28 November 2007	3	5:00	Bunkyo, Tokyo, Japan	
Win	9–0	Marcos dos Santos	Decision (unanimous)	Shooto Brazil 3: The Evolution	7 July 2007	3	5:00	Rio de Janeiro, Brazil	
Win	8–0	William Vianna	Decision (unanimous)	Shooto: Brazil 2	24 March 2007	3	5:00	Flamengo, Rio de Janeiro, Brazil	
Win	7–0	Erinaldo Rodriguez	Decision (unanimous)	Shooto Brazil 1: The Return	3 December 2006	3	5:00	Flamengo, Rio de Janeiro, Brazil	
Win	6–0	Marcelo Ferreira	Decision (unanimous)	Minotauro Fights 4	4 August 2006	3	5:00	Salvador, Bahia, Brazil	
Win	5–0	Alexandre Aranha	KO (punches)	Arena Combat Cup 2	5 November 2005	1	1:20	Brazil	
Win	4–0	Fabricio Medeiros	Decision (unanimous)	Shooto: Brazil 8	30 April 2005	3	5:00	Brazil	
Win	3–0	Orley de Oliveira	KO (punches)	Shooto: Brazil 7	19 March 2005	1	0:21	Brazil	
Win	2–0	Antonio Carlos Lima	Submission (triangle choke)	Arena Combat Cup 1	6 November 2004	2	N/A	São Paulo, Brazil	ACC 1 Featherweight Tournament Final.
Win	1–0	Tatu Nunes	Submission (rear-naked choke)	Arena Combat Cup 1	6 November 2004	1	N/A	São Paulo, Brazil	ACC 1 Featherweight Tournament Semifinal.

== See also ==
- List of male mixed martial artists
