= Shigeki Osawa =

Japanese mixed martial artist

Shigeki Osawa 大澤茂樹
- Born: Shigeki Osawa; May 2, 1986 (age 40)
- Nationality: Japanese
- Height: 5 ft 5 in (1.65 m)
- Weight: 143 lb (65 kg; 10.2 st)
- Division: Featherweight
- Style: Freestyle wrestling, Shootboxing
- Fighting out of: Ushiku, Ibaraki, Japan
- Team: Yoshida Dojo
- Years active: 2002–present

Mixed martial arts record
- Total: 24
- Wins: 14
- By knockout: 8
- By decision: 6
- Losses: 6
- By knockout: 1
- By decision: 5
- Draws: 3
- No contests: 1

Other information
- Mixed martial arts record from Sherdog

Shigeki Osawa Japanese: 大澤茂樹 (born May 2, 1986) is a Japanese professional mixed martial artist who competes in the featherweight division.

== Mixed martial arts career ==
=== Background ===
Osawa is a training partner of Japanese MMA veteran Michihiro Omigawa.

Osawa is a successful wrestler. Amongst his successes was his participation in the 8th World University Wrestling Championship in Greece where he won gold in the 60 kg division. He also won the All-Japan Freestyle Wrestling Championship 60 kg division in 2007, which gave him his entry into Sengoku.

=== Sengoku ===
In May 2009, Osawa made his Sengoku debut at Sengoku 8 against Kota Ishibashi. Osawa won the bout via unanimous decision (20–18, 20–19, 20–19).

Three months later, Osawa returned at Sengoku 9 against Toru Harai. Late in the first round, Osawa defeated Harai via TKO (punches).

After defeating Ki Hyun Kim at Sengoku 10, Osawa faced Ronnie Mann at Sengoku 11. Mann dominated the fight and claimed a unanimous decision victory, handing Osawa his first professional loss.

At Sengoku 12, Osawa returned to face Kyung Ho Kang. In another three round fight, Osawa once again won via decision.

In June 2010, Osawa faced Katsuya Toida at Sengoku 13. In the third round, the bout was ended after accidental kicks to the groin by Toida and ruled a "no contest".

Since his last fight with Sengoku, Osawa has competed in Pancrase, ZST, RINGS, Shooto, and Grachan.

== Mixed martial arts record ==
Professional record breakdown
24 matches	14 wins	6 losses
By knockout	8	1
By decision	6	5
Draws	3	
No contests	1	

Res.	Record	Opponent	Method	Event	Date	Round	Time	Location	Notes
Win	14–6–3 (1)	Caol Uno	TKO (punches)	Shooto: Professional Shooto 7/26	July 26, 2015	2	4:03	Tokyo, Japan	
Win	13–6–3 (1)	Wataru Miki	Decision (unanimous)	Shooto: 1st Round 2015	January 25, 2015	3	5:00	Tokyo, Japan	
Win	12–6–3 (1)	Keiji Sakuta	TKO (punches)	Grachan: Grachan 15	November 30, 2014	3	4:15	Tokyo, Japan	
Loss	11–6–3 (1)	Joji Mikami	KO (punch)	Vale Tudo Japan: VTJ 6th	October 4, 2014	1	2:01	Ota, Tokyo, Japan	
Win	11–5–3 (1)	Satoshi Murata	TKO (doctor stoppage)	Grachan 14 - Mach Matsuri	July 20, 2014	1	3:34	Tokyo, Japan	
Draw	10–5–3 (1)	Fumiya Sasaki	Draw (majority)	Shooto - 4th Round 2014	May 5, 2014	2	5:00	Tokyo, Japan	
Win	10–5–2 (1)	Kazuhiro Ito	Decision (unanimous)	Shooto - 1st Round 2014	January 13, 2014	3	5:00	Tokyo, Japan	
Loss	9–5–2 (1)	Akiyo Nishiura	Decision (split)	Vale Tudo Japan - VTJ 3rd	October 5, 2013	3	5:00	Tokyo, Japan	
Win	9–4–2 (1)	Kazuya Satomoto	TKO (doctor stoppage)	Shooto - 1st Round 2013	January 20, 2013	2	3:44	Tokyo, Japan	
Loss	8–4–2 (1)	Yoshifumi Nakamura	Decision (majority)	Shooto: Gig Tokyo 12	October 27, 2012	3	5:00	Tokyo, Japan	
Win	8–3–2 (1)	Hiroyuki Abe	TKO (punches)	Shooto: 10th Round	September 30, 2012	1	4:12	Tokyo, Japan	
Loss	7–3–2 (1)	Yusuke Yachi	Decision (unanimous)	Shooto: 3rd Round	March 10, 2012	3	5:00	Tokyo, Japan	
Win	7–2–2 (1)	Young Sam Jung	TKO (punches)	Rings: Battle Genesis Vol. 9	January 22, 2012	2	4:34	Tokyo, Japan	
Loss	6–2–2 (1)	Akitoshi Tamura	Decision (unanimous)	Shooto: Shooto the Shoot 2011	November 5, 2011	3	5:00	Tokyo, Japan	
Draw	6–1–2 (1)	Shunichi Shimizu	Draw	Zst: Battle Hazard 5	July 17, 2011	2	5:00	Tokyo, Japan	
Draw	6–1–1 (1)	Tomonari Kanomata	Draw (unanimous)	Pancrase: Passion Tour 10	November 3, 2010	3	5:00	Tokyo, Japan	
Win	6–1 (1)	Masaomi Saito	TKO (punches)	Pancrase: Passion Tour 9	October 3, 2010	1	1:42	Tokyo, Japan	
NC	5–1 (1)	Katsuya Toida	No Contest (accidental kicks to the groin)	World Victory Road Presents: Sengoku Raiden Championships 13	June 20, 2010	3	1:35	Tokyo, Japan	
Win	5–1	Kyung Ho Kang	Decision (unanimous)	World Victory Road Presents: Sengoku Raiden Championships 12	March 7, 2010	3	5:00	Tokyo, Japan	
Loss	4–1	Ronnie Mann	Decision (unanimous)	World Victory Road Presents: Sengoku 11	November 7, 2009	3	5:00	Tokyo, Japan	
Win	4–0	Ki Hyun Kim	Decision (unanimous)	World Victory Road Presents: Sengoku 10	September 23, 2009	2	5:00	Saitama, Japan	
Win	3–0	Toru Harai	TKO (punches)	World Victory Road Presents: Sengoku 9	August 2, 2009	1	4:24	Saitama, Japan	
Win	2–0	Kota Ishibashi	Decision (unanimous)	World Victory Road Presents: Sengoku 8	May 2, 2009	2	5:00	Tokyo, Japan	
Win	1–0	Hideo Matsui	Decision (unanimous)	Pancrase: Changing Tour 2	April 5, 2009	2	5:00	Tokyo, Japan	
