= List of World Victory Road champions =

This is a list of 'champions in the World Victory Road organization at each weight class. World Victory Road' is a Japanese mixed martial arts (MMA) organization.

== Title histories ==
=== Middleweight Championship ===
Weight limit: 85 kg (185.2 lb)

No.	Name	Event	Date	Defenses
1	(Brazil) Jorge Santiago def. Kazuo Misaki	Sengoku no Ran 2009; Saitama City, Japan	January 4, 2009	1. def. Mamed Khalidov at Sengoku 12 on Mar 7, 2010 in Tokyo, Japan; 2. def. Kazuo Misaki at Sendoku 14 on Aug 22, 2010 in Tokyo, Japan
The title was vacated on February 8, 2011 after Santiago was granted his release and signed with the UFC.

=== Welterweight Championship ===
Weight limit: 77 kg (169.7 lb)

No.	Name	Event	Date	Defenses
1	(Japan) Keita Nakamura def. Yasubey Enomoto	Soul of Fight; Tokyo, Japan	December 30, 2010	

=== Lightweight Championship ===
Weight limit: 70 kg (154.3 lb)

No.	Name	Event	Date	Defenses
1	(Japan) Satoru Kitaoka def. Takanori Gomi	Sengoku no Ran 2009; Saitama City, Japan	January 4, 2009	
2	(Japan) Mizuto Hirota	Sengoku 9 Saitama City, Japan	August 2, 2009	
Hirota vacated title on March 7, 2010 at Sengoku 12 after losing to DREAM champion Shinya Aoki at Dynamite!! 2009.

=== Featherweight Championship ===
Weight limit: 65 kg (143.3 lb)

No.	Name	Event	Date	Defenses
1	(Japan) Masanori Kanehara def. Michihiro Omigawa	Sengoku 9 Saitama City, Japan	August 2, 2009	
2	(Brazil) Marlon Sandro	Sengoku 13; Tokyo, Japan	June 20, 2010	
3	(Japan) Hatsu Hioki	Soul of Fight; Yokyo, Japan	December 30, 2010	
The title was vacated on June 25, 2011 after Hioki signed with the UFC.

== Tournament Winners ==
Event	Date	Division	Winner	Runner-up
World Victory Road Presents: Sengoku 6	November 1, 2008	Lightweight	(Japan) Satoru Kitaoka	(Japan) Kazunori Yokota
World Victory Road Presents: Sengoku 6	November 1, 2008	Middleweight	(Brazil) Jorge Santiago	(Japan) Kazuhiro Nakamura
Sengoku 9	August 2, 2009	Featherweight	(Japan) Masanori Kanehara	(Japan) Michihiro Omigawa
Soul of Fight	December 30, 2010	Welterweight	(Japan) Keita Nakamura	(Switzerland) Yasubey Enomoto

== See also ==
- List of current mixed martial arts champions
- List of Sengoku events
- Mixed martial arts weight classes
