= Kazunori =

- Gender: Male

Origin
- Origin: Japanese
- Meaning: Different meanings depending on the kanji used

Kazunori (written: 一慶, 一典, 一則, 一謙, 一徳, 一矩, 一紀, 和典, 和則, 和徳, 和行, 和範 or 和憲) is a masculine Japanese given name. Notable people with the name include:

- Aoki Kazunori (青木 一矩; 1541–1600), Japanese samurai
- Kazunori Iio (飯尾 一慶; born 1982), Japanese footballer
- Kazunori Itō (伊藤 和典; born 1954), Japanese anime screenwriter and artist
- Kazunori Kan (菅 和範; born 1985), Japanese footballer
- Kanechika Kazunori (金親 和行; born 1969), Japanese sumo wrestler
- Kazunori Koshikawa (越川 一紀; born 1956), Japanese high jumper
- Kazunori Kubota (窪田 和則; born 1975), Japanese judoka
- Kazunori Tanaka (田中 和徳; born 1949), Japanese politician
- Kazunori Tani (谷 和憲; born 1985), Japanese actor
- Kazunori Yamamoto (山本 一徳; born 1983), Japanese baseball player
- Kazunori Yamanoi (山井 和則; born 1962), Japanese politician
- Kazunori Yamauchi (山内 一典; born 1967), Japanese video game designer
- Kazunori Yokoo (横尾 和則), Japanese actor
- Kazunori Yokota (横田 一則; born 1978), Japanese mixed martial artist and judoka
- Kazunori Yoshimoto (吉本 一謙; born 1988), Japanese footballer
