= Hede =

Hede may refer to:

- Hede, Sheyang County (合德镇), town in and seat of Sheyang County, Jiangsu, China
- Hédé-Bazouges, commune in Ille-et-Vilaine, France
- Hede, Sweden, locality in Härjedalen Municipality, Jämtland County
- Deborah Hede (born 1959), American artist
