= 2010 in World Victory Road =

Mixed martial arts events

Information
- First date: March 7, 2010
- Last date: December 30, 2010

Events
- Total events: 6

Fights
- Total fights: 67
- Title fights: 4

Chronology
2009 in World Victory Road	2010 in World Victory Road

The year 2010 was the 3rd year in the history of World Victory Road, a mixed martial arts promotion based in Japan. In 2010 World Victory Road held 6 events beginning with, World Victory Road Presents: Sengoku Raiden Championships 12.

== Title fights ==
Title fights in 2010
Weight class				Method	Round	Time	Event	Notes
Middleweight	Jorge Santiago (c)	def.	Mamed Khalidov	Decision (Unanimous)	5	5:00	World Victory Road Presents: Sengoku Raiden Championships 12	(Note: For the Middleweight Championship.)
Featherweight	Marlon Sandro	def.	Masanori Kanehara (c)	KO (Punch)	1	0:38	World Victory Road Presents: Sengoku Raiden Championships 13	(Note: For the Featherweight Championship.)
Middleweight	Jorge Santiago (c)	def.	Kazuo Misaki	TKO (Corner Stoppage)	5	4:31	World Victory Road Presents: Sengoku Raiden Championships 14	(Note: For the Middleweight Championship.)
Welterweight	Keita Nakamura	def.	Yasubey Enomoto	Submission (Rear-Naked Choke)	2	3:48	World Victory Road Presents: Soul of Fight	(Note: For the Welterweight Championship.)

== Events list ==
#	Event Title	Date	Arena	Location
20	World Victory Road Presents: Soul of Fight	December 30, 2010	Ariake Coliseum	Tokyo, Japan
19	World Victory Road Presents: Sengoku Raiden Championships 15	October 30, 2010	Ryogoku Kokugikan	Tokyo, Japan
18	World Victory Road Presents: Sengoku Raiden Championships 14	August 22, 2010	Ryogoku Kokugikan	Tokyo, Japan
17	World Victory Road Presents: Asia Vol. 1	July 4, 2010	Differ Ariake	Tokyo, Japan
16	World Victory Road Presents: Sengoku Raiden Championships 13	June 20, 2010	Ryogoku Kokugikan	Tokyo, Japan
15	World Victory Road Presents: Sengoku Raiden Championships 12	March 7, 2010	Ryogoku Kokugikan	Tokyo, Japan

== World Victory Road Presents: Sengoku Raiden Championships 12 ==
World Victory Road Presents: Sengoku Raiden Championships 12 was an event held on March 7, 2010 at the Ryogoku Kokugikan in Tokyo, Japan.

=== Results ===
Main Card
Weight class				Method	Round	Time	Notes
Middleweight	Jorge Santiago (c)	def.	Mamed Khalidov	Decision (Unanimous)	5	5:00	(Note: For the Middleweight Championship.)
	Akihiro Gono	def.	Diego Gonzalez	Decision (Unanimous)	3	5:00
	Maximo Blanco	def.	Chang Hyun Kim	KO (Head Kick and Punches)	1	1:10
	Marlon Sandro	def.	Tomonari Kanomata	KO (Punch)	1	0:09
	Yoshihiro Nakao	def.	Sentoryū Henri	TKO (Punches)	2	3:27
	Yuji Hoshino	def.	Nick Denis	Submission (Guillotine Choke)	2	0:47
	Leonardo Santos	def.	Kiuma Kunioku	Submission (Rear-Naked Choke)	1	3:06
	Shigeki Osawa	def.	Kyung Ho Kang	Decision (Unanimous)	3	5:00

== World Victory Road Presents: Sengoku Raiden Championships 13 ==
World Victory Road Presents: Sengoku Raiden Championships 13 was an event held on June 20, 2010 at the Ryogoku Kokugikan in Tokyo, Japan.

=== Results ===
Main Card
Weight class				Method	Round	Time	Notes
Featherweight	Marlon Sandro	def.	Masanori Kanehara (c)	KO (Punch)	1	0:38	(Note: For the Featherweight Championship.)
	Hiroshi Izumi	def.	Chang Seob Lee	TKO (Punches)	1	4:37
	Yasubey Enomoto	def.	Sanae Kikuta	TKO (Punches)	1	3:57
	Maximo Blanco	def.	Rodrigo Damm	TKO (Punches)	2	0:45
	Keita Nakamura	def.	Omar de la Cruz	TKO (Punches)	2	3:53
	Takuya Wada	def.	Jae Sun Lee	Decision (Split)	3	5:00
	Shigeki Osawa	vs.	Katsuya Toida	NC (Accidental Kicks to the Groin)	3	1:35
	Choi Doo-ho	def.	Ikuo Usuda	Decision (Split)	3	5:00
	Ryo Kawamura	def.	Hidetada Irie	TKO (Punches)	2	3:00
	Kazuki Tokudome	def.	Yuma Ishizuka	TKO (Punches)	1	3:22
	Ye Won Nam	def.	Ikkei Nagamura	Submission (Rear-Naked Choke)	1	3:03

== World Victory Road Presents: Asia Vol. 1 ==
World Victory Road Presents: Asia Vol. 1 was an event held on July 4, 2010 at Differ Ariake in Tokyo, Japan.

=== Results ===
Main Card
Weight class				Method	Round	Time	Notes
	Koji Kanechika	def.	Sang Soo Lee	Decision (Unanimous)	3	5:00
	Masahiro Toryu	def.	Noah Villanueva	Submission (Heel Hook)	1	2:54
	Gil Woo Lee	def.	Ayato Taneichi	KO (Punches)	1	0:10
	Shintaro Ishiwatari	def.	Nobuhiro Yamauchi	TKO (Punches)	1	3:13
	Takuya Eizumi	def.	Takumi Shimazaki	Decision (Unanimous)	2	5:00
	Shoko Sato	def.	Hiryu Okamoto	Decision (Unanimous)	2	5:00
	Tatsuya So	def.	Min Jong Song	Decision (Unanimous)	2	5:00
	Wataru Takahashi	def.	Shohei Kondo	Submission (Rear-Naked Choke)	2	1:22
	Hirokazu Nishimura	def.	Wataru Inatsu	Decision (Unanimous)	2	5:00
	Jae Hyun So	def.	Ichiro Sugita	Decision (Unanimous)	2	5:00

== World Victory Road Presents: Sengoku Raiden Championships 14 ==
World Victory Road Presents: Sengoku Raiden Championships 14 was an event held on August 22, 2010 at the Ryogoku Kokugikan in Tokyo, Japan.

=== Results ===
Main Card
Weight class				Method	Round	Time	Notes
Middleweight	Jorge Santiago (c)	def.	Kazuo Misaki	TKO (Corner Stoppage)	5	4:31	(Note: For the Middleweight Championship.)
	Jadamba Narantungalag	def.	Akihiro Gono	Decision (Unanimous)	3	5:00
	Hatsu Hioki	def.	Jeff Lawson	Submission (Triangle Choke)	1	2:09
	Leonardo Santos	def.	Sotaro Yamada	DQ (Knees to the Groin)	1	3:56
	Taisuke Okuno	def.	Nick Thompson	KO (Punch)	3	0:27
	Yasubey Enomoto	def.	Kenta Takagi	Submission (Bulldog Choke)	2	0:53
	Takuya Sato	def.	Motoki Miyazawa	Decision (Unanimous)	3	5:00
	Shintaro Ishiwatari	def.	Gil Woo Lee	Submission (Guillotine Choke)	1	2:20
	Shoko Sato	def.	Takuya Eizumi	TKO (Doctor Stoppage)	2	1:38
	Wataru Takahashi	def.	Tatsuya So	Submission (Rear-Naked Choke)	2	4:34
	Jae Hyun So	def.	Hirokazu Nishimura	Decision (Unanimous)	2	5:00

== World Victory Road Presents: Sengoku Raiden Championships 15 ==
World Victory Road Presents: Sengoku Raiden Championships 15 was an event held on October 30, 2010 at the Ryogoku Kokugikan in Tokyo, Japan.

=== Results ===
Main Card
Weight class				Method	Round	Time	Notes
	Hiroshi Izumi	def.	James Zikic	Decision (Split)	3	5:00
	Brian Cobb	def.	Kazunori Yokota	Decision (Split)	3	5:00
	Maximo Blanco	def.	Kiuma Kunioku	KO (Punches)	1	4:26
	Kazuo Takahashi	def.	Chang Seob Lee	Submission (Scarf Hold Armlock)	1	2:28
	Keita Nakamura	def.	Takuya Wada	Submission (Punches)	1	3:30
	Yasubey Enomoto	def.	Taisuke Okuno	Decision (Unanimous)	3	5:00
	Taiyo Nakahara	def.	Shintaro Ishiwatari	Decision (Split)	2	5:00
	Akitoshi Tamura	def.	Shoko Sato	Decision (Split)	2	5:00
	Shunichi Shimizu	def.	Wataru Takahashi	Decision (Unanimous)	2	5:00
	Manabu Inoue	def.	Jae Hyun So	Decision (Unanimous)	2	5:00

== World Victory Road Presents: Soul of Fight ==
World Victory Road Presents: Soul of Fight was an event held on December 30, 2010 at the Ariake Coliseum in Tokyo, Japan.

=== Results ===
Main Card
Weight class				Method	Round	Time	Notes
	Hatsu Hioki	def.	Marlon Sandro	Decision (Unanimous)	5	5:00
	Kazuo Misaki	def.	Mike Seal	TKO (Punches)	1	1:15
	Megumi Fujii	def.	Emi Fujino	Decision (Unanimous)	3	5:00
	Yoshiro Maeda	def.	Masanori Kanehara	TKO (Punches)	1	1:27
	Taisuke Okuno	def.	Ryo Chonan	KO (Punch)	1	0:19
	Maximo Blanco	def.	Won Sik Park	Decision (Unanimous)	3	5:00
Welterweight	Keita Nakamura	def.	Yasubey Enomoto	Submission (Rear-Naked Choke)	2	3:48	(Note: For the Welterweight Championship.)
	Jadamba Narantungalag	def.	Kazunori Yokota	KO (Punch)	1	2:03
	Mamed Khalidov	def.	Yuki Sasaki	TKO (Punches)	1	2:22
	Dave Herman	def.	Yoshihiro Nakao	Decision (Unanimous)	3	5:00
	Taiyo Nakahara	def.	Akitoshi Tamura	DQ (Low Blows)	1	2:07
	Shunichi Shimizu	def.	Manabu Inoue	Decision (Unanimous)	2	5:00
	Rin Nakai	def.	Mika Harigai	Submission (Keylock)	1	2:09
	Misaki Takimoto	def.	Amy Davis	Decision (Split)	2	5:00
	Yukio Sakaguchi	def.	Jin Suk Jung	Decision (Unanimous)	1	5:00
	Kiyotaka Shimizu	def.	Ichiro Sugita	Decision (Split)	1	5:00
	Sotaro Yamada	def.	Yi Sak Kim	TKO (Punches)	1	1:40

== See also ==
- World Victory Road
