= 2008 in World Victory Road =

Mixed martial arts events

Information
- First date: March 5, 2008
- Last date: September 1, 2008

Events
- Total events: 6

Fights
- Total fights: 51

Chronology
2008 in World Victory Road	2009 in World Victory Road

The year 2008 was the 1st year in the history of World Victory Road, a mixed martial arts promotion based in Japan. In 2008 World Victory Road held 6 events beginning with, World Victory Road Presents: Sengoku Vanguard.

== Events list ==
#	Event title	Date	Arena	Location
6	World Victory Road Presents: Sengoku 6	September 1, 2008	Saitama Super Arena	Saitama City, Japan
5	World Victory Road Presents: Sengoku 5	September 28, 2008	Yoyogi National Gymnasium	Tokyo, Japan
4	World Victory Road Presents: Sengoku 4	September 24, 2008	Saitama Super Arena	Saitama City, Japan
3	World Victory Road Presents: Sengoku 3	June 8, 2008	Saitama Super Arena	Saitama City, Japan
2	World Victory Road Presents: Sengoku 2	May 18, 2008	Ariake Coliseum	Tokyo, Japan
1	World Victory Road Presents: Sengoku First Battle	March 5, 2008	Yoyogi National Gymnasium	Tokyo, Japan

== World Victory Road Presents: Sengoku First Battle ==
World Victory Road Presents: Sengoku First Battle was an event held on March 5, 2008 at the Yoyogi National Gymnasium in Tokyo, Japan.

=== Results ===
Main Card
Weight class				Method	Round	Time	Notes
	Josh Barnett	def.	Hidehiko Yoshida	Submission (Heel Hook)	3	3:23
	Takanori Gomi	def.	Duane Ludwig	TKO (Doctor Stoppage)	1	2:28
	Kazuo Misaki	def.	Siyar Bahadurzada	Submission (Guillotine Choke)	2	2:02
	Kazuyuki Fujita	def.	Peter Graham	Submission (North-South Choke)	1	1:23
	Evangelista Santos	def.	Makoto Takimoto	Submission (Achilles Lock)	1	4:51
	Ryo Kawamura	def.	Antônio Braga Neto	Decision (Unanimous)	3	5:00
	Nick Thompson	def.	Fabricio Monteiro	Decision (Unanimous)	3	5:00

== World Victory Road Presents: Sengoku 2 ==
World Victory Road Presents: Sengoku 2 was an event held on May 18, 2008 at the Ariake Coliseum in Tokyo, Japan.

=== Results ===
Main Card
Weight class				Method	Round	Time	Notes
	Josh Barnett	def.	Jeff Monson	Decision (Unanimous)	3	5:00
	Roger Gracie	def.	Yuki Kondo	Submission (Rear-Naked Choke)	1	2:40
	Kevin Randleman	def.	Ryo Kawamura	Decision (Unanimous)	3	5:00
	Yoshihiro Nakao	def.	Jim York	KO (Punches)	2	0:45
	Jorge Santiago	def.	Yuki Sasaki	Submission (Armbar)	3	2:10
	Eiji Mitsuoka	def.	Kwang Hee Lee	Submission (Rear-Naked Choke)	1	4:15
	Mike Pyle	def.	Dan Hornbuckle	Submission (Triangle Choke)	1	4:52
	Satoru Kitaoka	def.	Ian James Schaffa	Submission (Guillotine Choke)	1	0:50

== World Victory Road Presents: Sengoku 3 ==
World Victory Road Presents: Sengoku 3 was an event held on June 8, 2008 at the Saitama Super Arena in Saitama City, Japan.

=== Results ===
Main Card
Weight class				Method	Round	Time	Notes
	Hidehiko Yoshida	def.	Maurice Smith	Submission (Neck Crank)	1	2:23
	Travis Wiuff	def.	Kazuyuki Fujita	KO (Punches)	1	1:24
	Kazuo Misaki	def.	Logan Clark	Decision (Unanimous)	3	5:00
	Nick Thompson	def.	Michael Costa	Submission (Kimura)	2	4:13
	Sanae Kikuta	def.	Chris Rice	Submission (Armbar)	2	3:54
	Marcio Cruz	def.	Mu Bae Choi	Submission (Triangle Armbar)	1	4:37
	Rodrigo Damm	def.	Jorge Masvidal	TKO (Punch)	2	4:38
	Fábio Silva	def.	Kazuo Takahashi	KO (Knee)	2	0:24

== World Victory Road Presents: Sengoku 4 ==
World Victory Road Presents: Sengoku 4 was an event held on September 24, 2008 at the Saitama Super Arena in Saitama City, Japan.

=== Results ===
Main Card
Weight class				Method	Round	Time	Notes
	Takanori Gomi	def.	Tae Hyun Bang	Decision (Unanimous)	3	5:00
	Frank Trigg	def.	Makoto Takimoto	Decision (Unanimous)	3	5:00
	Satoru Kitaoka	def.	Clay French	Submission (Achilles Lock)	1	0:31
	Eiji Mitsuoka	def.	Rodrigo Damm	Submission (Rear-Naked Choke)	1	3:13
	Kazunori Yokota	def.	Bojan Kosednar	Decision (Unanimous)	3	5:00
	Mizuto Hirota	def.	Ryan Schultz	KO (Superman Punch)	2	4:25
	Dongi Yang	def.	Pawel Nastula	TKO (Exhaustion)	2	2:15
	Moise Rimbon	def.	Peter Graham	Submission (Rear-Naked Choke)	2	0:42
	Valentijn Overeem	def.	Kazuo Takahashi	KO (Flying Knee)	1	2:42

== World Victory Road Presents: Sengoku 5 ==
World Victory Road Presents: Sengoku 5 was an event held on September 28, 2008 at the Yoyogi National Gymnasium in Tokyo, Japan.

=== Results ===
Main Card
Weight class				Method	Round	Time	Notes
Light heavyweight	Alexandre Ribeiro	def.	Takashi Sugiura	TKO (Knees and Punches)	3	4:18
Heavyweight	Muhammed Lawal	def.	Travis Wiuff	TKO (Punches)	1	2:11
Lightweight	Kiuma Kunioku	def.	A-Sol Kwon	Decision (Unanimous)	3	5:00
Middleweight Grand Prix
Middleweight	Yuki Sasaki	def.	Yuki Kondo	Submission (Rear-Naked Choke)	2	1:08
Middleweight	Kazuhiro Nakamura	def.	Paul Cahoon	Decision (Unanimous)	3	5:00
Middleweight	Jorge Santiago	def.	Logan Clark	Submission (Arm-Triangle Choke)	2	3:55
Middleweight	Siyar Bahadurzada	def.	Evangelista Santos	TKO (Arm Injury)	1	0:22
Lightweight Grand Prix Reserve
Lightweight	Jorge Masvidal	def.	Ryan Schultz	TKO (Punches)	1	1:57

== World Victory Road Presents: Sengoku 6 ==
World Victory Road Presents: Sengoku 6 was an event held on November 1, 2008 at the Saitama Super Arena in Saitama City, Japan.

=== Results ===
Lightweight Grand Prix Final
Weight class				Method	Round	Time	Notes
Lightweight	Satoru Kitaoka	def.	Kazunori Yokota	Decision (Unanimous)	3	5:00
Middleweight Grand Prix Final
Middleweight	Jorge Santiago	def.	Kazuhiro Nakamura	TKO (Punches)	3	0:49
Main Card
Lightweight	Sergey Golyaev	def.	Takanori Gomi	Decision (Split)	3	5:00
Heavyweight	Muhammed Lawal	def.	Fábio Silva	TKO (Punches)	3	0:41
Light heavyweight	Antônio Rogério Nogueira	def.	Moise Rimbon	Decision (Unanimous)	3	5:00
Lightweight Grand Prix Reserve
Lightweight	Jorge Masvidal	def.	Tae Hyun Bang	Decision (Unanimous)	3	5:00
Middleweight Grand Prix Reserve
Middleweight	Joe Doerksen	def.	Izuru Takeuchi	TKO (Punches)	3	4:13
Lightweight Grand Prix Semi-Finals
Lightweight	Satoru Kitaoka	def.	Eiji Mitsuoka	Submission (Heel Hook)	1	1:16
Lightweight	Kazunori Yokota	def.	Mizuto Hirota	Decision (Unanimous)	3	5:00
Middleweight Grand Prix Semi-Finals
Middleweight	Kazuhiro Nakamura	def.	Yuki Sasaki	Decision (Unanimous)	3	5:00
Middleweight	Jorge Santiago	def.	Siyar Bahadurzada	Submission (Heel Hook)	1	1:10

== See also ==
- World Victory Road
