= Maximo Blanco =

Venezuelan mixed martial arts fighter

- Born: Maximo Ernis Blanco Visazno; October 16, 1983 (age 43); Falcón, Venezuela
- Other names: Maxi
- Height: 5 ft 8 in (1.73 m)
- Weight: 146 lb (66 kg; 10.4 st)
- Division: Lightweight; Featherweight (current)
- Reach: 71 in (180 cm)
- Fighting out of: Albuquerque, New Mexico, United States
- Team: Greg Jackson's Submission Fighting; Yoshida Dojo; Sengoku Training Players (formerly)
- Rank: Green belt in Tae Kwon Do
- Years active: 2008–2016

Mixed martial arts record
- Total: 22
- Wins: 12
- By knockout: 8
- By decision: 4
- Losses: 8
- By submission: 4
- By decision: 2
- By disqualification: 2
- Draws: 1
- No contests: 1

Other information
- Mixed martial arts record from Sherdog

Maximo Blanco (born October 16, 1983) is a Venezuelan professional mixed martial artist who last competed in the Featherweight division of the Ultimate Fighting Championship. A professional competitor since 2008, Blanco is the former Lightweight King of Pancrase and has also competed in Strikeforce and World Victory Road.

== Background ==
Blanco, originally from Venezuela, trained in Tae Kwon Do for three years, reaching the rank of green belt, before being introduced to wrestling at the age of 14 by his cousin. Blanco competed in the sport for a year at German Villalobos High School, before being recruited to compete for the inaugural team at Sendai Ikuei Gakuen High School in Japan along with three other Venezuelans. Blanco faced problems with bullying and fitting into a new society, but continued to excel at wrestling, winning All-Japan honors before being recruited again to compete at Nihon University. Upon graduating, Blanco continued competing and won International Championships in Venezuela, China, and Azerbaijan. Blanco was also a competitor at the 2007 Pan American Games and came close to winning a Bronze Medal in the 144 lb weight division, he later lost the third place match via points to Peruvian grappler Aldo Parimango.

== Mixed martial arts career ==
=== Pancrase ===
Blanco made his mixed martial arts debut on August 27, 2008, against Yuki Yashima at Pancrase: Shining 6. The bout ended in a no contest after an accidental headbutt.

He returned to the promotion at Pancrase: Shining 8 on October 1, 2008, and knocked out Hiroki Aoki with a slam and punches in just 22 seconds.

Blanco faced Daisuke Hanazawa at Pancrase: Shining 10 on December 7, 2008, and was defeated by submission due to an arm-triangle choke in the second round.

He faced Koji Oishi at Pancrase: Changing Tour 2 on April 5, 2009. The fight was ruled a draw after two rounds.

=== Sengoku Raiden Championship ===
Blanco made his debut for Sengoku Raiden Championship at World Victory Road Presents: Sengoku no Ran 2009 on January 4, 2009, and knocked out standout wrestler Seigo Inoue with stomps in 38 seconds, it was later revealed in a SRC press conference that Blanco had broken Seigo's orbital bone with the stomps and Inoue was later forced into a 3-year retirement to rehabilitate his injury.

Blanco returned to SRC at Sengoku 8 on May 2, 2009, against Akihiko Mori. He was disqualified after striking Mori with an illegal soccer kick after knocking him down with a punch.

In his next fight, Blanco became the Lightweight King of Pancrase by defeating veteran Katsuya Inoue, older brother of Seigo Inoue, with punches in the second round at Pancrase: Changing Tour 4 on August 8, 2009.

Blanco faced Tetsuya Yamada at Sengoku 10 on September 23, 2009. He won the fight by TKO in the second round.

On March 7, 2010, Blanco knocked out Chang Hyun Kim with a head kick at Sengoku Raiden Championships 12.

Blanco was matched up against Rodrigo Damm at Sengoku Raiden Championships 13 on June 20, 2010. He defeated Damm by TKO early in the second round.

Blanco faced Kiuma Kunioku at Sengoku Raiden Championship 15 on October 30, 2010. He won the fight via KO late in the first round.

On April 11, 2011, Pancrase announced Blanco had vacated his title, due to an inability to defend his belt because of numerous injuries.

=== Strikeforce ===
Blanco next signed a three-fight deal with Strikeforce.

Blanco was expected to face Josh Thomson at Strikeforce 36 but a foot injury caused Thompson to drop out. Pat Healy stepped in for the injured Thomson. Blanco lost the bout via submission in the second round.

=== Ultimate Fighting Championship ===
On September 14, 2011, Blanco's management stated that he would be moving down to the Featherweight division and that his next fight would be in the UFC.

In his debut, Blanco faced Marcus Brimage on April 21, 2012, at UFC 145. He lost the fight via split decision.

For his second fight with the promotion, Blanco took on Sam Sicilia on April 13, 2013, at The Ultimate Fighter 17 Finale. He won the back-and-forth fight via unanimous decision.

Blanco faced Akira Corassani on November 30, 2013, at The Ultimate Fighter 18 Finale. Early in the opening round Blanco landed an illegal knee to the head of Corassani when he had a knee and hand on the ground. Corassani indicated that he was unable to continue, so Blanco lost the bout via disqualification.

Blanco faced Felipe Arantes on February 15, 2014, at UFC Fight Night 36. He lost the fight via unanimous decision.

Blanco then faced Andy Ogle on May 31, 2014, at UFC Fight Night 41. He won the fight by unanimous decision.

Blanco next faced Dan Hooker on September 20, 2014, at UFC Fight Night 52. He won the fight via unanimous decision.

Blanco next faced Mike De La Torre on July 12, 2015, at The Ultimate Fighter 21 Finale. He won the fight via TKO in the first round.

Blanco was expected to face Dennis Bermudez on January 17, 2016, at UFC Fight Night 81. However, Bermudez pulled out of the fight in early December citing injury and was replaced by promotional newcomer Luke Sanders. He lost the fight via submission in the first round.

Blanco returned to face Chas Skelly on September 17, 2016, at UFC Fight Night 94. He lost the fight via submission in the fight's opening minute.

== Championships and accomplishments ==
=== Mixed martial arts ===
- Pancrase
  - Pancrase Lightweight Championship (One time)
- Sherdog
  - 2010 All-Violence Second Team

== Mixed martial arts record ==
Professional record breakdown
22 matches	12 wins	8 losses
By knockout	8	0
By submission	0	4
By decision	4	2
By disqualification	0	2
Draws	1	
No contests	1	

Res.	Record	Opponent	Method	Event	Date	Round	Time	Location	Notes
Loss	12–8–1 (1)	Chas Skelly	Technical Submission (anaconda choke)	UFC Fight Night: Poirier vs. Johnson	September 17, 2016	1	0:19	Hidalgo, Texas, United States	
Loss	12–7–1 (1)	Luke Sanders	Submission (rear-naked choke)	UFC Fight Night: Dillashaw vs. Cruz	January 17, 2016	1	3:38	Boston, Massachusetts, United States	
Win	12–6–1 (1)	Mike De La Torre	TKO (punches)	The Ultimate Fighter: American Top Team vs. Blackzilians Finale	July 12, 2015	1	0:16	Las Vegas, Nevada, United States	Catchweight (148.5 lbs) bout; Blanco missed weight.
Win	11–6–1 (1)	Dan Hooker	Decision (unanimous)	UFC Fight Night: Hunt vs. Nelson	September 20, 2014	3	5:00	Saitama, Japan	
Win	10–6–1 (1)	Andy Ogle	Decision (unanimous)	UFC Fight Night: Munoz vs. Mousasi	May 31, 2014	3	5:00	Berlin, Germany	
Loss	9–6–1 (1)	Felipe Arantes	Decision (unanimous)	UFC Fight Night: Machida vs. Mousasi	February 15, 2014	3	5:00	Jaraguá do Sul, Brazil	
Loss	9–5–1 (1)	Akira Corassani	DQ (illegal knee)	The Ultimate Fighter: Team Rousey vs. Team Tate Finale	November 30, 2013	1	0:25	Las Vegas, Nevada, United States	
Win	9–4–1 (1)	Sam Sicilia	Decision (unanimous)	The Ultimate Fighter: Team Jones vs. Team Sonnen Finale	April 13, 2013	3	5:00	Las Vegas, Nevada, United States	
Loss	8–4–1 (1)	Marcus Brimage	Decision (split)	UFC 145	April 21, 2012	3	5:00	Atlanta, Georgia, United States	Featherweight debut.
Loss	8–3–1 (1)	Pat Healy	Submission (rear-naked choke)	Strikeforce: Barnett vs. Kharitonov	September 10, 2011	2	4:27	Cincinnati, Ohio, United States	
Win	8–2–1 (1)	Won Sik Park	Decision (unanimous)	World Victory Road Presents: Soul of Fight	December 30, 2010	3	5:00	Tokyo, Japan	
Win	7–2–1 (1)	Kiuma Kunioku	KO (punches)	World Victory Road Presents: Sengoku Raiden Championships 15	October 30, 2010	1	4:26	Tokyo, Japan	
Win	6–2–1 (1)	Rodrigo Damm	TKO (punches)	World Victory Road Presents: Sengoku Raiden Championships 13	June 20, 2010	2	0:45	Saitama, Japan	
Win	5–2–1 (1)	Chang Hyun Kim	KO (head kick and punches)	World Victory Road Presents: Sengoku Raiden Championships 12	March 7, 2010	1	1:10	Tokyo, Japan	
Win	4–2–1 (1)	Tetsuya Yamada	TKO (punches)	World Victory Road Presents: Sengoku 10	September 23, 2009	2	1:12	Saitama, Japan	
Win	3–2–1 (1)	Katsuya Inoue	TKO (punches)	Pancrase: Changing Tour 4	August 8, 2009	2	4:38	Tokyo, Japan	Won the Pancrase Lightweight Championship.
Loss	2–2–1 (1)	Akihiko Mori	DQ (illegal soccer kick)	World Victory Road Presents: Sengoku 8	May 2, 2009	1	4:20	Tokyo, Japan	
Draw	2–1–1 (1)	Koji Oishi	Draw	Pancrase: Changing Tour 2	April 5, 2009	2	5:00	Tokyo, Japan	
Win	2–1 (1)	Seigo Inoue	KO (stomps)	World Victory Road Presents: Sengoku no Ran 2009	January 4, 2009	1	0:38	Saitama, Japan	
Loss	1–1 (1)	Daisuke Hanazawa	Submission (arm-triangle choke)	Pancrase: Shining 10	December 7, 2008	2	2:19	Tokyo, Japan	
Win	1–0 (1)	Hiroki Aoki	TKO (slam and punches)	Pancrase: Shining 8	October 1, 2008	1	0:22	Tokyo, Japan	
NC	0–0 (1)	Yuki Yashima	NC (accidental headbutt)	Pancrase: Shining 6	August 27, 2008	1	0:56	Tokyo, Japan	

== See also ==
- List of current UFC fighters
- List of male mixed martial artists
