= Ki Hyun Kim =

South Korean mixed martial arts fighter

- Born: January 15, 1991 (age 35); South Korea
- Nationality: South Korean
- Height: 5 ft 7 in (1.70 m)
- Weight: 145 lb (66 kg; 10 st 5 lb)
- Division: Featherweight
- Fighting out of: South Korea
- Team: CMA Korea; Jon Fighter
- Years active: 2009

Mixed martial arts record
- Total: 3
- Wins: 2
- By knockout: 1
- By submission: 1
- Losses: 1
- By decision: 1

Other information
- Mixed martial arts record from Sherdog

Korean name
- Hangul: 김기현
- RR: Gim Gihyeon
- MR: Kim Kihyŏn

Ki Hyun Kim (born January 15, 1991) is a South Korean former mixed martial artist who competed in the featherweight division of World Victory Road.

== Mixed martial arts career ==
=== World Victory Road ===
Kim made his professional mixed martial arts debut against Seong Hyun Yoon on March 11, 2009 at World Victory Road Presents: Gold Rush Korea. He won the bout via armbar submission in the first round. Later on the same event, Kim faced Jin Hyun Kim. He won the bout via TKO following a corner stoppage in the first round.

Kim then faced Shigeki Osawa on September 23, 2009 at World Victory Road Presents: Sengoku 10. He lost the bout via unanimous decision.

== Mixed martial arts record ==
Professional record breakdown
| 3 matches | 2 wins | 1 loss |
| By knockout | 1 | 0 |
| By submission | 1 | 0 |
| By decision | 0 | 1 |

| Res. | Record | Opponent | Method | Event | Date | Round | Time | Location | Notes |
|---|---|---|---|---|---|---|---|---|---|
| Loss | 2–1 | Shigeki Osawa | Decision (unanimous) | World Victory Road Presents: Sengoku 10 | September 23, 2009 | 2 | 5:00 | Saitama, Japan | |
| Win | 2–0 | Kim Jin-hyun | TKO (corner stoppage) | World Victory Road Presents: Sengoku Gold Rush Korea | March 11, 2009 | 1 | 4:58 | Seoul, South Korea | Won the Sengoku Gold Rush Korea Featherweight Tournament. |
| Win | 1–0 | Yoon Seong-hyun | Submission (armbar) | World Victory Road Presents: Sengoku Gold Rush Korea | March 11, 2009 | 1 | 0:45 | Seoul, South Korea | Featherweight debut. Sengoku Gold Rush Korea Featherweight Tournament Semifinal. |

== See also ==
- List of male mixed martial artists
