= Masanori Kanehara =

Japanese mixed martial arts fighter

- Born: November 18, 1982 (age 43); Musashimurayama, Tokyo, Japan
- Native name: 金原正徳
- Other names: Kincyan
- Nationality: Japanese
- Height: 5 ft 8 in (1.73 m)
- Weight: 145 lb (66 kg; 10.4 st)
- Division: Lightweight; Featherweight; Bantamweight
- Reach: 67 in (170 cm)
- Fighting out of: Hachioji, Tokyo, Japan
- Team: Alpha; Paraestra Hachioji
- Rank: Black belt in Brazilian Jiu-Jitsu
- Years active: 2003–present

Mixed martial arts record
- Total: 52
- Wins: 31
- By knockout: 11
- By submission: 11
- By decision: 9
- Losses: 16
- By knockout: 7
- By submission: 4
- By decision: 4
- By disqualification: 1
- Draws: 5

Other information
- Mixed martial arts record from Sherdog

Masanori Kanehara (Japanese: 金原正徳; born November 18, 1982) is a Japanese mixed martial artist currently competing the Bantamweight division in DEEP and Rizin FF. A professional competitor since 2003, Kanehara has formerly competed for World Victory Road, K-1, the UFC, Pancrase, ZST, and also made an appearance at Dynamite!! 2009. Kanehara is the 2009 Sengoku Featherweight Grand Prix Champion and inaugural Sengoku Featherweight Champion.

== Mixed martial arts career ==
=== Early career ===
Kanehara made his professional mixed martial arts debut in 2003, and compiled a record of 13–6–5 before being signed by World Victory Road.

=== Sengoku Featherweight Grand Prix ===
Kanehara was announced as a participant in World Victory Road's Featherweight Grand Prix. He advanced to the semi-final round with a pair of closely contested decision victories over Jong Man Kim in the first round and Chan Sung Jung in the second round.

Kanehara lost in the semi-finals to Hatsu Hioki, but ended up replacing Hioki in the final against judoka Michihiro Omigawa after Hioki was not medically cleared due to a concussion. A 17-to-1 long shot, Kanehara ended up winning the tournament, making him the 2009 Sengoku Featherweight Grand Prix Champion and Sengoku Featherweight Champion.

Following the announcement that Sengoku Lightweight Champion Mizuto Hirota would vacate his belt, Kanehara accepted a challenge from Marlon Sandro. The two met in a Featherweight title bout at World Victory Road Presents: Sengoku 13. Kanehara lost via KO in the first round.

=== Post-Sengoku ===
After the demise of Sengoku, Kanehara compiled a record of 7–2 which included a 21-second knockout of Joe Pearson at Pancrase 252.

=== Ultimate Fighting Championship ===
In July 2014, it was announced that Kanehara had signed with the UFC. Kanehara was briefly linked to a bout with Urijah Faber on September 20, 2014, at UFC Fight Night 52. However, before the bout was officially announced, Faber was removed and Kanehara instead faced Alex Caceres. He was successful in his debut winning via unanimous decision.

Kanehara was expected to face Rani Yahya on June 27, 2015, at UFC Fight Night 70. However, as the event approached, several international fighters experienced travel restrictions due to technical issues within the Bureau of Consular Affairs division of the U.S. State Department which produces travel visas. The issue lead to a major altering of the card as multiple fights were postponed. Yahya/Kanehara eventually took place on July 15, 2015, at UFC Fight Night 71. Kanehara lost the fight by split decision.

Kanehara faced Michael McDonald on January 2, 2016, at UFC 195. After a dominant first round and catching McDonald with an arm triangle in round two, McDonald slipped out and found a choke of his own. Kanehara lost the fight via submission in the second round and was subsequently released from the promotion following the loss.

=== Post-UFC career ===
After the release from the UFC, Kanehara returned to Deep and was expected to face Roman Alvarez in his promotional debut at Deep Cage Impact 2016: DEEP vs. WSOF-GC on December 17, 2016. Alvarez was replaced by Charlie Alaniz, whom Kanehara won via first-round doctor stoppage.

Next he faced Jomhod Chuwattana at DEEP Hachioji Chojin Matsuri 2018 on April 1, 2020. Kanehara won the fight via submission in the first round.

After the two victories in a row, Kanehara signed with Rizin FF and made his promotional debut against Victor Henry at Rizin 21 – Hamamatsu on February 22, 2020. Kanehara lost the fight via second-round knockout.

Kanehara faced Takahiro Ashida at Rizin 31 - Yokohama on October 24, 2021. He won the bout via TKO in the second round.

Kanehara was booked to face Kazumasa Majima on April 16, 2022, at Rizin Trigger 3. He won the fight by a third-round technical knockout.

Kanehara faced Sora Yamamoto at Rizin Landmark 5 on April 29, 2023, winning the fight by unanimous decision.

Kanehara faced Kleber Koike Erbst at Rizin 44 on September 24, 2023, winning the bout via unanimous decision using his wrestling to nullify Kleber's BJJ skills.

Kanehara faced reigning champion Chihiro Suzuki for the Rizin Featherweight Championship at Rizin 46 on April 29, 2024. He lost the bout by a first-round technical knockout.

== Championships and Accomplishments ==
- Sengoku
  - Sengoku Featherweight Championship (1 Time, First)
  - 2009 Sengoku Featherweight Grand Prix Winner

== Mixed martial arts record ==
Professional record breakdown
| 48 matches | 29 wins | 14 losses |
| By knockout | 11 | 7 |
| By submission | 10 | 2 |
| By decision | 8 | 4 |
| By disqualification | 0 | 1 |
| Draws | 5 | |

| Res. | Record | Opponent | Method | Event | Date | Round | Time | Location | Notes |
|---|---|---|---|---|---|---|---|---|---|
| Loss | 29–14–5 | YA-MAN | KO (punches) | Super Rizin 4 | July 27, 2025 | 3 | 2:51 | Saitama, Japan | |
| Loss | 29–13–5 | Chihiro Suzuki | TKO (punches) | Rizin 46 | April 29, 2024 | 1 | 4:20 | Tokyo, Japan | For the Rizin Featherweight Championship. |
| Win | 29–12–5 | Kleber Koike Erbst | Decision (unanimous) | Rizin 44 | September 24, 2023 | 3 | 5:00 | Saitama, Japan | |
| Win | 28–12–5 | Sora Yamamoto | Decision (unanimous) | Rizin Landmark 5 | April 29, 2023 | 3 | 5:00 | Tokyo, Japan | |
| Win | 27–12–5 | Kazumasa Majima | TKO (punches) | Rizin Trigger 3 | April 16, 2022 | 3 | 3:37 | Chōfu, Japan | |
| Win | 26–12–5 | Takahiro Ashida | TKO (punches and elbows) | Rizin 31 | October 24, 2021 | 2 | 1:18 | Yokohama, Japan | |
| Loss | 25–12–5 | Victor Henry | TKO (punches) | Rizin 21 | February 22, 2020 | 2 | 0:45 | Hamamatsu, Japan | Bantamweight bout. |
| Win | 25–11–5 | Jomhod Chuwattana | Submission (arm-triangle choke) | DEEP Hachioji Chojin Matsuri 2018 | April 1, 2018 | 1 | 1:55 | Tokyo, Japan | Return to Featherweight. |
| Win | 24–11–5 | Charlie Alaniz | TKO (doctor stoppage) | DEEP Cage Impact 2016 | December 17, 2016 | 1 | 0:30 | Tokyo, Japan | |
| Loss | 23–11–5 | Michael McDonald | Submission (rear-naked choke) | UFC 195 | January 2, 2016 | 2 | 2:09 | Las Vegas, Nevada, United States | |
| Loss | 23–10–5 | Rani Yahya | Decision (split) | UFC Fight Night: Mir vs. Duffee | July 15, 2015 | 3 | 5:00 | San Diego, California, United States | |
| Win | 23–9–5 | Alex Caceres | Decision (unanimous) | UFC Fight Night: Hunt vs. Nelson | September 20, 2014 | 3 | 5:00 | Saitama, Japan | |
| Loss | 22–9–5 | Toshiaki Kitada | DQ (fighter thrown from ring) | DEEP 66 Impact | April 29, 2014 | 1 | 1:37 | Tokyo, Japan | |
| Win | 22–8–5 | Joe Pearson | KO (punch) | Pancrase 252 | September 29, 2013 | 1 | 0:21 | Yokohama, Japan | |
| Win | 21–8–5 | Wade Choate | Submission (arm-triangle choke) | DEEP 62 Impact | April 26, 2013 | 1 | 4:16 | Tokyo, Japan | |
| Win | 20–8–5 | Tom McKenna | KO (punch to the body) | DEEP: Haleo Impact | December 22, 2012 | 1 | 2:45 | Tokyo, Japan | |
| Win | 19–8–5 | Tony Reyes | TKO (punches) | DEEP Tokyo Impact 2012 | July 21, 2012 | 1 | 4:28 | Tokyo, Japan | Bantamweight debut. |
| Win | 18–8–5 | Jake Hattan | Submission (rear-naked choke) | HEAT 22 | April 8, 2012 | 1 | 3:16 | Tokyo, Japan | Lightweight bout. |
| Win | 17–8–5 | Brady Harrison | Submission (rear-naked choke) | Xplode Fight Series: Hillside Havoc | November 19, 2011 | 3 | 3:59 | Valley Center, California, United States | Catchweight (140 lb) bout. |
| Loss | 16–8–5 | Rasul Mirzaev | TKO (punches) | Fight Nights: Battle of Moscow 4 | July 7, 2011 | 1 | 1:44 | Moscow, Russia | |
| Win | 16–7–5 | Motoshi Miyaji | KO (punches) | Pancrase: Impressive Tour 5 | June 5, 2011 | 2 | 0:09 | Tokyo, Japan | |
| Loss | 15–7–5 | Yoshiro Maeda | TKO (punches) | World Victory Road Presents: Soul of Fight | December 30, 2010 | 1 | 1:27 | Tokyo, Japan | |
| Loss | 15–6–5 | Marlon Sandro | KO (punch) | World Victory Road Presents: Sengoku 13 | June 20, 2010 | 1 | 0:38 | Tokyo, Japan | Lost the Sengoku Featherweight Championship. |
| Win | 15–5–5 | Norifumi Yamamoto | Decision (unanimous) | Dynamite!! 2009 | December 31, 2009 | 3 | 5:00 | Saitama, Japan | Non-title bout. |
| Win | 14–5–5 | Michihiro Omigawa | Decision (split) | World Victory Road Presents: Sengoku 9 | August 2, 2009 | 3 | 5:00 | Saitama, Japan | Won the 2009 Sengoku Featherweight Grand Prix and the inaugural Sengoku Featherweight Championship. |
| Loss | 13–5–5 | Hatsu Hioki | Decision (unanimous) | World Victory Road Presents: Sengoku 9 | August 2, 2009 | 3 | 5:00 | Saitama, Japan | 2009 Sengoku Featherweight Grand Prix Semifinal. |
| Win | 13–4–5 | Jung Chan-sung | Decision (unanimous) | World Victory Road Presents: Sengoku 8 | May 2, 2009 | 3 | 5:00 | Tokyo, Japan | 2009 Sengoku Featherweight Grand Prix Quarterfinal. |
| Win | 12–4–5 | Kim Jong-man | Decision (unanimous) | World Victory Road Presents: Sengoku 7 | March 20, 2009 | 3 | 5:00 | Tokyo, Japan | 2009 Sengoku Featherweight Grand Prix Round of 16. |
| Win | 11–4–5 | Kenji Arai | KO (punches) | Pancrase: Changing Tour 1 | February 1, 2009 | 1 | 3:14 | Tokyo, Japan | |
| Loss | 10–4–5 | Takafumi Otsuka | Decision (split) | DEEP 38 Impact | October 23, 2008 | 2 | 5:00 | Tokyo, Japan | Featherweight debut. |
| Win | 10–3–5 | Isamu Sugiuchi | KO (punches) | Fighting Network ZST: Battle Hazard 03 | August 24, 2008 | 1 | 0:47 | Tokyo, Japan | |
| Loss | 9–3–5 | Erikas Petraitis | Decision (unanimous) | Shooto Lithuania: Bushido 2008 | March 16, 2008 | 2 | 5:00 | Vilnius, Lithuania | |
| Win | 9–2–5 | Shunichi Shimizu | Submission (armbar) | Fighting Network ZST 16 | February 24, 2008 | 2 | 0:42 | Tokyo, Japan | |
| Draw | 8–2–5 | Naoyuki Kotani | Draw (time limit) | Fighting Network ZST 15 | November 23, 2007 | 2 | 5:00 | Tokyo, Japan | |
| Win | 8–2–4 | Yoichiro Karsuyama | Submission (rear-naked choke) | Fighting Network ZST 14 | October 7, 2007 | 1 | 3:45 | Tokyo, Japan | |
| Loss | 7–2–4 | Tashiro Nishiuchi | KO (head kick and punch) | Fighting Network ZST 13 | June 10, 2007 | 1 | 3:59 | Tokyo, Japan | |
| Win | 7–1–4 | Arunas Jurgelenas | Submission (choke) | Shooto Estonia: Bushido | April 14, 2007 | 1 | 1:47 | Tallinn, Estonia | |
| Win | 6–1–4 | Tetsu Suzuki | Decision (majority) | K-1 Hero's 8 | March 12, 2007 | 2 | 5:00 | Nagoya, Japan | |
| Win | 5–1–4 | Shinya Sato | Submission (armbar) | Fighting Network ZST 12 | February 12, 2007 | 1 | 0:56 | Tokyo, Japan | |
| Win | 4–1–4 | Taro Himura | Submission (armbar) | Fighting Network ZST: Swat! 08 | December 17, 2006 | 1 | 2:20 | Tokyo, Japan | |
| Win | 3–1-4 | Kenichi Ito | KO (punch) | Fighting Network ZST: Swat! 07 | October 1, 2006 | 2 | 1:00 | Tokyo, Japan | |
| Draw | 2–1–4 | Hiroyuki Ota | Draw (time limit) | Fighting Network ZST: Swat! 06 | August 27, 2006 | 2 | 5:00 | Tokyo, Japan | |
| Win | 2–1–3 | Hisashi Hiyama | Submission (armbar) | Fighting Network ZST: Swat! 05 | June 4, 2006 | 1 | 0:56 | Tokyo, Japan | |
| Win | 1–1–3 | Toshiyuki Saito | TKO (knee) | Fighting Network ZST: Swat! 04 | April 23, 2006 | 1 | 1:37 | Tokyo, Japan | |
| Loss | 0–1–3 | Shinya Sato | Submission (kimura) | Fighting Network ZST 8 | November 23, 2005 | 2 | 2:47 | Tokyo, Japan | |
| Draw | 0–0–3 | Norimasa Isozaki | Draw (time limit) | ZST: Battle Hazard 2 | September 10, 2005 | 2 | 5:00 | Tokyo, Japan | |
| Draw | 0–0–2 | Hiroyuki Ota | Draw (time limit) | Fighting Network ZST: Swat! 02 | July 24, 2005 | 2 | 5:00 | Tokyo, Japan | |
| Draw | 0–0–1 | Masayuki Okude | Draw (time limit) | Fighting Network ZST: Swat! 01 | April 17, 2005 | 2 | 5:00 | Tokyo, Japan | Lightweight debut. |

== See also ==
- List of current UFC fighters
- List of male mixed martial artists

| New championship | 1st Sengoku Featherweight Champion; August 2, 2009 - June 20, 2010 | Succeeded by Marlon Sandro |
