= Makoto Takimoto =

Japanese judoka and mixed martial arts fighter

- Born: December 8, 1974 (age 51); Iwai, Japan
- Nationality: Japanese
- Height: 1.74 m (5 ft 9 in)
- Weight: 81 kg (179 lb; 12.8 st)
- Division: Middleweight (formerly); Welterweight
- Style: MMA, Judo
- Team: Yoshida Dojo

Mixed martial arts record
- Total: 11
- Wins: 6
- By submission: 2
- By decision: 4
- Losses: 5
- By knockout: 1
- By submission: 1
- By decision: 3

Other information
- University: Nihon University
- Mixed martial arts record from Sherdog
- Judo career
- Weight class: ‍–‍81 kg
- Rank: 4th dan black belt

Judo achievements and titles
- Olympic Games: (gold) (2000)
- World Champ.: 13th (1997)
- Asian Champ.: (gold) (1995)
Medal record
Men's judo
Representing Japan
Olympic Games
Gold medal – first place	2000 Sydney	‍–‍81 kg
Asian Championships
Gold medal – first place	1995 New Delhi	‍–‍78 kg
Bronze medal – third place	2000 Osaka	‍–‍81 kg
East Asian Games
Bronze medal – third place	1997 Busan	‍–‍78 kg

Profile at external judo databases
- IJF: 53202
- JudoInside.com: 2969

Makoto Takimoto (瀧本 誠, Takimoto Makoto; born December 8, 1974) is a Japanese retired judoka and mixed martial artist from Nihon University. He won a gold medal at the Half Middleweight category of the 2000 Summer Olympics.

== Judo career ==
Takimoto was relatively unknown entering the 2000 Summer Olympics in Sydney, Australia with his biggest victory before 2000 coming in the 1995 Asian Games. He recorded a Sode tsurikomi goshi and two Yukos in the gold medal match vs. In-Chul Cho. Throughout his career, Takimoto defeated many notable judoka, including Olympic medalists Djamel Bouras, Bertrand Damaisin and Flávio Canto.

== Mixed martial arts career ==
Takimoto began to consider a career in MMA after attending Pride 28 on October 31, 2004 and seeing his friends and fellow judoka have success in the sport. He announced on December 7, 2004 that he would make his debut at Pride Shockwave 2004 against any fighter at any weight, as long as it was a "non-judo fighter." He got his wish and made his debut vs. former Sumo Maegashira Henry Miller, winning via unanimous decision. He outlanded Miller almost 2-to-1 in significant strikes and took him down twice despite being significantly outweighed. He fought for Pride six times in his career, posting a 3-3 record with the organization. His victories came against the aforementioned Miller, fellow judoka Dong-Sik Yoon and Taekwondo expert Zelg Galešić.

After Pride was disbanded in 2007, Takimoto earned the biggest victory of his MMA career, a split decision win over former UFC Middleweight Champion Murilo Bustamante at Yarennoka on December 31, 2007. He then joined the Sengoku Raiden Championship and fought four times with the organization. Takimoto was expected to participate in ASTRA, the farewell event for Hidehiko Yoshida on April 25, 2010. However, he pulled out of the event and announced his retirement alongside Yoshida.

== Mixed martial arts record ==
Professional record breakdown
11 matches	6 wins	5 losses
By knockout	0	1
By submission	2	1
By decision	4	3

Res.	Record	Opponent	Method	Event	Date	Round	Time	Location	Notes
Win	6–5	Jae Sun Lee	Decision (unanimous)	World Victory Road Presents: Sengoku 10	September 23, 2009	3	5:00	Saitama, Japan	
Win	5–5	Michael Costa	Submission (heel hook)	World Victory Road Presents: Sengoku 8	May 2, 2009	1	3:31	Tokyo, Japan	Welterweight debut
Loss	4–5	Frank Trigg	Decision (unanimous)	World Victory Road Presents: Sengoku 4	August 24, 2008	3	5:00	Saitama, Japan	
Loss	4–4	Evangelista Santos	Submission (achilles lock)	World Victory Road Presents: Sengoku First Battle	March 5, 2008	1	4:51	Tokyo, Japan	
Win	4–3	Murilo Bustamante	Decision (split)	Yarennoka!	December 31, 2007	2	5:00	Saitama, Japan	
Win	3–3	Zelg Galešic	Submission (kimura)	Pride 34	April 8, 2007	1	5:40	Saitama, Japan	
Loss	2–3	Gegard Mousasi	TKO (broken eye socket)	Pride - Bushido 11	June 4, 2006	1	5:34	Saitama, Japan	
Loss	2–2	Sanae Kikuta	Decision (unanimous)	Pride Shockwave 2005	December 31, 2005	3	5:00	Saitama, Japan	
Win	2–1	Dong-Sik Yoon	Decision (unanimous)	Pride 30	October 23, 2005	3	5:00	Saitama, Japan	
Loss	1–1	Kiyoshi Tamura	Decision (unanimous)	Pride Critical Countdown 2005	June 26, 2005	3	5:00	Saitama, Japan	
Win	1–0	Henry Miller	Decision (unanimous)	Pride Shockwave 2004	December 31, 2004	3	5:00	Saitama, Japan	
