= Kazunori Tani =

Japanese actor

- Born: October 4, 1985 (age 40); United States
- Other name: Mike Tani
- Occupation: Actor
- Years active: 2003–2008

Kazunori Tani (谷 和憲, Tani Kazunori; born October 4, 1985) is an American-born Japanese former actor.

== Biography ==
Tani was born to an American father and a Japanese mother. His family moved to Ibaraki Prefecture when Tani was two years-old. As a child actor, he was part of the 26-member Precoci, a performing group. His stage name at that time was Mike Tani (マイク谷). In 2003, Tani won the grand prize at the 16th Annual Junon Super Boy Contest and changed his stage name to Tani Kazunori. He currently lives in America, and it's unclear whether he's still working as an actor.

== Films ==
- Hideshi Hino's Occult Detective Club: The Doll Cemetery (2004), as Makihara Daisuke (牧原 大介)
- Schoolboy Crush (2007), as Hanazono Riku (花園 陸)
- Koisuru Ketsuekigata (恋する血液型)

== Television dramas ==
- Ginza Kōkyū Kurabu Mama Aoyama Miyuki 3 (銀座高級クラブママ青山みゆき3)

== Commercials ==
- Kit Kat (2002)
- Coca-Cola (2004)

== Theatre ==
- Dear Boys, the Musical (2007), as Moriyama Atsushi (森山 敦司)
- Swing
- Itazura na Kiss: Koi no Mikata no Gakuen Densetsu (2008, イタズラなKiss〜恋の味方の学園伝説), at the Theatre Sun-Mall in Tokyo
- Hiiro no Kakera, the Musical (2008–2009, 緋色の欠片), as Kutani Ryō (狗谷 遼)

== Awards ==
- 2003 Junon Super Boy Contest - Grand Prize
