= Deborah Hede =

American artist

Deborah Hede (born 1959) is an American artist. Her work is included in the collections of the Whitney Museum of American Art and the Los Angeles County Museum of Art. Hede received The Pollock-Krasner Foundation, Inc., award in 2013. The Drawing Center Viewing Program, New York, features selections of her art.
