= Kazuo Misaki =

Japanese mixed martial arts fighter

Kazuo Misaki 三崎和雄
- Born: April 25, 1976 (age 50); Katori, Chiba, Japan
- Other names: The Grabaka Hitman
- Height: 1.78 m (5 ft 10 in)
- Weight: 77 kg (170 lb; 12.1 st)
- Division: Middleweight; Welterweight
- Style: Judo, Kickboxing
- Stance: Orthodox
- Fighting out of: Chiba Prefecture, Japan
- Team: Haleo Top Team; Katori Dojo
- Teacher: Sanae Kikuta
- Rank: 3rd Dan Black Belt in Judo
- Years active: 2001–2013

Mixed martial arts record
- Total: 39
- Wins: 25
- By knockout: 6
- By submission: 9
- By decision: 10
- Losses: 11
- By knockout: 3
- By submission: 2
- By decision: 6
- Draws: 2
- No contests: 1

Other information
- Mixed martial arts record from Sherdog

Kazuo Misaki (Japanese: 三崎和雄, born April 25, 1976) is a retired Japanese professional mixed martial artist. A professional competitor from 2001 until 2013, he was the 2006 PRIDE Welterweight (183 lbs) Grand Prix Champion, and also competed in Sengoku, Pancrase, DEEP, and Strikeforce. His 2010 bout with Jorge Santiago for the Sengoku Middleweight Championship was InsideMMA's "Fight of the Year."

== Mixed martial arts career ==
=== Early career ===
Misaki started training judo in middle school. He later added kickboxing training in the Katori Dojo, and was finally introduced to mixed martial arts by Sanae Kikuta as part of his Grabaka team.

=== PRIDE ===
En route to the 2006 PRIDE Welterweight Grand Prix finals he defeated Phil Baroni and Dan Henderson in a non-title bout. Misaki was eliminated in the semifinals by Paulo Filho, but Filho injured his knee during the contest and was unable to continue to the finals. Misaki was named as his replacement and defeated Denis Kang by split decision.

His last fight in PRIDE was a unanimous decision loss to Frank Trigg at PRIDE 33 on February 24, 2007.

=== Post-PRIDE ===
At the Yarennoka event on New Year's Eve 2007, he fought Yoshihiro Akiyama. The original result of the match was a knockout victory for Misaki, but Akiyama protested the finish. The knockout kick came as Akiyama attempted to get back to his feet after being knocked down by Misaki. Akiyama contested that one or more of his hands were on the mat at the time of the kick, which would make the kick illegal under Yarennoka! rules. After reviewing video of the knockout, the Yarennoka executive committee agreed; the official result was then changed to "no contest."

=== Sengoku ===
He went on to fight in World Victory Road's inaugural event "Sengoku", on March 5, 2008, where he defeated Siyar Bahadurzada. and won by guillotine choke at 2:02 of the second round.

His next fight was at Sengoku 3 on June 8, 2008, where he beat Logan Clark by unanimous decision.

He then signed with Strikeforce in 2008, where he was scheduled to fight Joe Riggs but was forced to pull out due to injury.

Misaki then faced off against MWGP winner Jorge Santiago to determine WVR's first MW champion. Misaki was utilizing striking to keep Santiago at a distance, countering his kicks and punches. Misaki was dominating the fight until he got taken down and submitted in the final round.

On November 8, 2009 Misaki announced he was leaving his long-time gym GRABAKA.

Misaki recently lost to K-1 fighter Melvin Manhoef via a controversial stoppage at Dynamite!! 2009. Misaki was dropped by a punch from Manhoef and the referee stopped the fight before Manhoef could follow him to the ground.

=== Strikeforce ===
In his Welterweight debut, Misaki faced Paul Daley at Strikeforce: Tate vs. Rousey. He won the fight via split decision.

=== Retirement ===
After beating Paul Daley, Misaki retired from MMA competition.

== Personal life ==
=== Legal troubles ===
On March 19, 2009, Misaki was pulled over by a police officer for talking on his cellphone while driving, when pulling over Misaki attempted to flee the scene, knocking into the arresting officers' car. On June 26, the Tokyo District Court sentenced him to one year of prison, which has been suspended for three years.

Misaki fought and beat Kazuhiro Nakamura at Sengoku 9, however he did not receive pay, and went on immediate indefinite suspension after the fight.

== Championships and accomplishments ==
- PRIDE Fighting Championships
  - 2006 PRIDE Welterweight Grand Prix Champion
- Sherdog
  - 2010 Fight of the Year vs. Jorge Santiago
- Inside MMA
  - 2010 Bazzie Award for Fight of the Year vs. Jorge Santiago
- Bleacher Report
  - 2010 Fight of the Year vs. Jorge Santiago

== Mixed martial arts record ==
Professional record breakdown
39 matches	25 wins	11 losses
By knockout	6	3
By submission	9	2
By decision	10	6
Draws	2	
No contests	1	

Res.	Record	Opponent	Method	Event	Date	Round	Time	Location	Notes
Win	25–11–2 (1)	Paul Daley	Decision (split)	Strikeforce: Tate vs. Rousey	March 3, 2012	3	5:00	Columbus, Ohio, United States	Welterweight debut.
Win	24–11–2 (1)	Akira Shoji	TKO (punches)	DEEP: 53 Impact	April 22, 2011	2	1:13	Tokyo, Japan	
Win	23–11–2 (1)	Mike Seal	TKO (punches)	World Victory Road Presents: Soul of Fight	December 30, 2010	1	1:15	Tokyo, Japan	
Loss	22–11–2 (1)	Jorge Santiago	TKO (corner stoppage)	World Victory Road Presents: Sengoku Raiden Championships 14	August 22, 2010	5	4:30	Tokyo, Japan	For the Sengoku Middleweight Championship; Fight of the Year.
Loss	22–10–2 (1)	Melvin Manhoef	TKO (punches)	Dynamite!! 2009	December 31, 2009	1	1:49	Saitama, Japan	
Win	22–9–2 (1)	Kazuhiro Nakamura	Technical Submission (guillotine choke)	World Victory Road Presents: Sengoku 9	August 2, 2009	1	3:03	Saitama, Japan	
Loss	21–9–2 (1)	Jorge Santiago	Technical Submission (rear-naked choke)	World Victory Road Presents: Sengoku no Ran 2009	January 4, 2009	5	3:26	Saitama, Japan	For the Sengoku Middleweight Championship.
Win	21–8–2 (1)	Joe Riggs	TKO (punches)	Strikeforce: At The Mansion II	September 20, 2008	2	2:29	Beverly Hills, California, United States	
Win	20–8–2 (1)	Logan Clark	Decision (unanimous)	World Victory Road Presents: Sengoku 3	June 8, 2008	3	5:00	Saitama, Japan	
Win	19–8–2 (1)	Siyar Bahadurzada	Submission (guillotine choke)	World Victory Road Presents: Sengoku First Battle	March 5, 2008	2	2:02	Tokyo, Japan	
NC	18–8–2 (1)	Yoshihiro Akiyama	No Contest	Yarennoka	December 31, 2007	1	7:48	Saitama, Japan	Originally knockout win; Akiyama was hit with illegal soccer kick.
Loss	18–8–2	Frank Trigg	Decision (unanimous)	PRIDE 33	February 24, 2007	3	5:00	Nevada, United States	
Win	18–7–2	Denis Kang	Decision (split)	PRIDE Bushido 13	November 5, 2006	2	5:00	Yokohama, Japan	Won PRIDE 2006 Welterweight Grand Prix; replaced Filho.
Loss	17–7–2	Paulo Filho	Submission (armbar)	PRIDE Bushido 13	November 5, 2006	1	9:43	Yokohama, Japan	PRIDE 2006 Welterweight Grand Prix Semifinal.
Win	17–6–2	Dan Henderson	Decision (unanimous)	PRIDE Bushido 12	August 26, 2006	2	5:00	Nagoya, Japan	PRIDE 2006 Welterweight Grand Prix Quarterfinal.
Win	16–6–2	Phil Baroni	Decision (unanimous)	PRIDE Bushido 11	June 4, 2006	2	5:00	Saitama, Japan	PRIDE 2006 Welterweight Grand Prix Opening Round.
Loss	15–6–2	Dan Henderson	Decision (unanimous)	PRIDE Bushido 10	April 2, 2006	2	5:00	Tokyo, Japan	
Win	15–5–2	Akira Shoji	Technical Submission (guillotine choke)	DEEP: 23 Impact	February 5, 2006	1	2:32	Tokyo, Japan	
Loss	14–5–2	Daniel Acacio	Decision (Unanimous)	PRIDE Bushido 8	July 17, 2005	2	5:00	Nagoya, Japan	
Win	14–4–2	Flavio Luiz Moura	Submission (north-south choke)	Pancrase: Spiral 2	March 6, 2005	2	2:13	Yokohama, Japan	
Loss	13–4–2	Nate Marquardt	Decision (unanimous)	Pancrase: Brave 10	November 7, 2004	3	5:00	Tokyo, Japan	For the vacant Pancrase Middleweight Championship.
Win	13–3–2	Ed Herman	Technical Submission (arm-triangle choke)	Pancrase: 2004 Neo-Blood Tournament Final	July 25, 2004	2	3:31	Tokyo, Japan	
Win	12–3–2	Jorge Patino	Decision (unanimous)	PRIDE Bushido 3	May 23, 2004	2	5:00	Yokohama, Japan	
Win	11–3–2	Kiuma Kunioku	TKO (doctor stoppage)	Pancrase: Brave 1	February 6, 2004	2	1:31	Tokyo, Japan	
Draw	10–3–2	Jake Shields	Draw	Pancrase: Hybrid 10	November 30, 2003	3	5:00	Tokyo, Japan	
Loss	10–3–1	Ricardo Almeida	Decision (majority)	Pancrase: 10th Anniversary Show	August 31, 2003	3	5:00	Tokyo, Japan	
Win	10–2–1	Yuji Hisamatsu	Submission (rear-naked choke)	Pancrase: Hybrid 5	May 18, 2003	3	2:34	Yokohama, Japan	
Draw	9–2–1	Yuji Hisamatsu	Draw	Pancrase: Hybrid 3	March 8, 2003	2	5:00	Tokyo, Japan	
Win	9–2	Joe D'Arce	TKO (punches)	Pancrase: Hybrid 1	January 26, 2003	2	4:51	Tokyo, Japan	
Win	8–2	Masaya Kojima	Submission (armbar)	Pancrase: Spirit 8	November 30, 2002	1	4:40	Yokohama, Japan	
Win	7–2	Kousei Kubota	Decision (unanimous)	Pancrase: 2002 Anniversary Show	September 29, 2002	3	5:00	Yokohama, Japan	
Loss	6–2	Nate Marquardt	TKO (broken arm)	Pancrase: Spirit 3	March 25, 2002	1	0:29	Tokyo, Japan	
Win	6–1	Ryuki Ueyama	Decision (unanimous)	Pancrase: Spirit 2	February 17, 2002	3	5:00	Umeda Stella Hall	
Loss	5–1	Chris Lytle	Decision (unanimous)	Pancrase: Proof 7	December 1, 2001	3	5:00	Yokohama, Japan	
Win	5–0	Takaku Fuke	KO (punches)	Pancrase: Proof 6	October 30, 2001	1	0:08	Tokyo, Japan	
Win	4–0	Hiroki Nagaoka	Submission (guillotine choke)	Pancrase: 2001 Neo-Blood Tournament Second Round	July 29, 2001	2	1:21	Tokyo, Japan	
Win	3–0	Seiki Ryo	Decision (split)	Pancrase: 2001 Neo-Blood Tournament Second Round	July 29, 2001	3	5:00	Tokyo, Japan	
Win	2–0	Hikaru Sato	Submission (rear naked choke)	Pancrase: 2001 Neo-Blood Tournament Opening Round	July 29, 2001	1	4:08	Tokyo, Japan	Middleweight debut.
Win	1–0	Kenichi Serizawa	Decision (unanimous)	Pancrase: 2001 Neo-Blood Tournament Eliminations	May 5, 2001	3	5:00	Osaka, Japan	

== See also ==
- List of male mixed martial artists
