= Nick Thompson (fighter) =

American mixed martial arts fighter

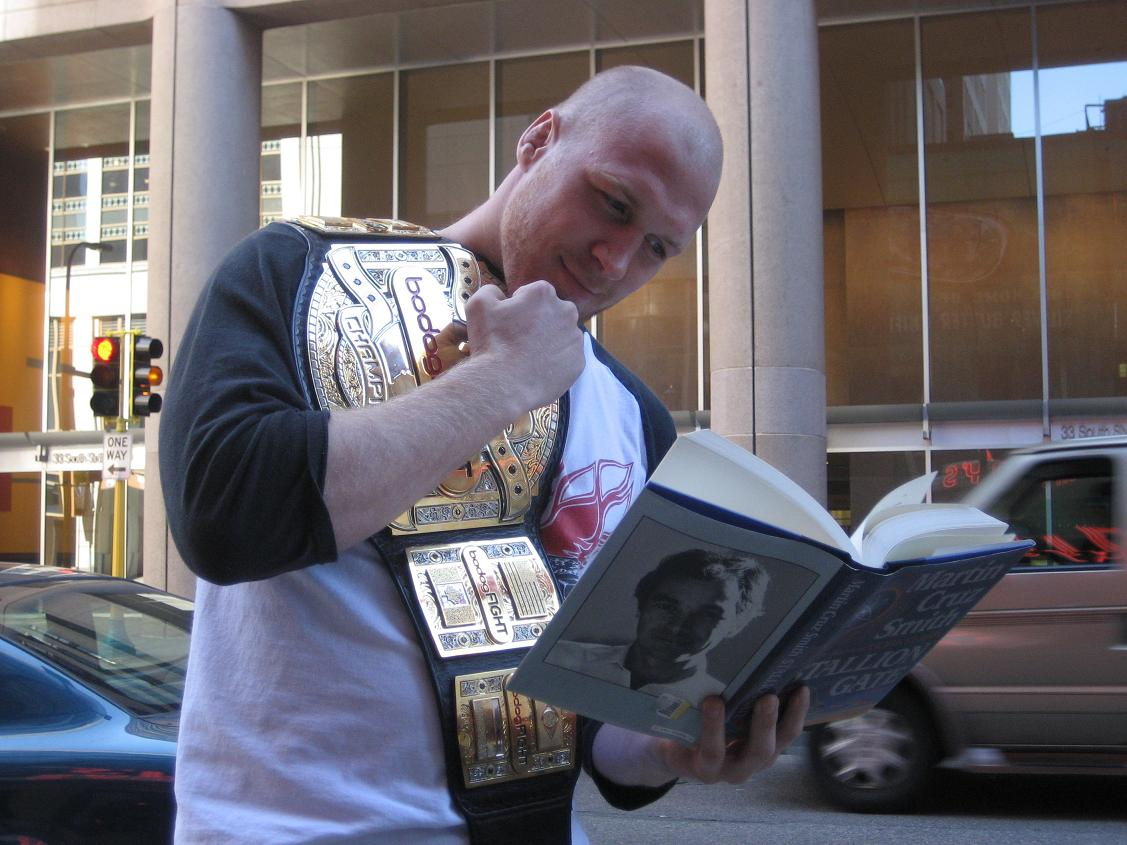
- Nick Thompson
- Born: June 23, 1981 (age 45); Newport News, Virginia, U.S.
- Other names: The Goat
- Height: 6 ft 1 in (1.85 m)
- Weight: 170 lb (77 kg; 12 st)
- Division: Middleweight; Welterweight; Lightweight
- Stance: Orthodox
- Fighting out of: Brooklyn Park, Minnesota, United States
- Team: Minnesota Martial Arts Academy
- Years active: 2003–2011

Mixed martial arts record
- Total: 53
- Wins: 38
- By knockout: 14
- By submission: 18
- By decision: 6
- Losses: 14
- By knockout: 9
- By submission: 4
- By decision: 1
- Draws: 1

Other information
- Mixed martial arts record from Sherdog

Nicholas Delton Thompson (born June 23, 1981) is a retired American mixed martial artist. A professional from 2003 until 2011, he competed for the Ultimate Fighting Championship (UFC), Strikeforce, Bellator Fighting Championships, and Bodog Fight. He is the former Bodog Fight Welterweight Champion.

== Background ==
While attending college, Nick wrestled at the University of Wisconsin from 2000–2002. He then began training with coach Dave Strasser at Dave Strasser’s Freestyle Academy in Kenosha, Wisconsin. While there, he trained with manager Pat O'Malley, Ron Faircloth, Nick Agallar, and Brian Geraghty. In 2005, Nick moved to attend the University of Minnesota Law School. He began training under coach Greg Nelson at Minnesota Martial Arts Academy. Nelson is closely affiliated with Erik Paulson, founder of Combat Submission Wrestling. While there, Nick trained with fighters Sean Sherk, Brock Lesnar, Brock Larson, Nik Lentz, Derrick Noble, Paul Bradley, and Kaitlin Young. Thereafter, he was awarded a black belt in jiujitsu by James Peterson.

== Mixed martial arts career ==
=== UFC ===
He made his UFC debut at UFC 56 where he defeated Keith Wisniewski. He returned to the UFC on April 15, 2006, where he lost against the highly ranked and seasoned judoka Karo Parisyan at UFC 59.

=== Bodog Fight ===
Following his fights in the UFC, and after three warm-up fights with smaller organizations, Thompson signed with Bodog Fight, a former MMA organisation. After cutting through three Bodog opponents, Thompson was offered his title fight with Eddie Alvarez, a previously undefeated fighter. After winning his fight against Alvarez on April 14, 2007, Thompson has since defended his title twice.

=== World Victory Road ===
Nick's final title defense against John Troyer was the last fight on his contract with Bodog. Rumors of his intent to sign with World Victory Road were confirmed with his addition to the organization's March 3, 2008 inaugural Sengoku show. Nick was scheduled to face Fabricio Monteiro in his debut. He won this debut against Monteiro via three-round unanimous decision.

=== EliteXC ===
Nick fought Jake Shields on July 26, 2008 for the newly created EliteXC Welterweight title, losing via submission in the first round.

=== Strikeforce ===
On February 25, 2009 in a radio interview, Thompson confirmed that he has signed on with California-based Mixed Martial Arts promotion Strikeforce. Thomson stated in his interview that he could be fighting as early as April 11, 2009.

=== Shine Fights ===
Nick signed a multi-fight deal with upstart, Ohio and Florida based promotion, Shine Fights. Before even making his debut, he was requested to a new deal.

=== Ultimate Glory ===
Nick was supposed to fight Siyar Bahadurzada at Ultimate Glory 12 on Oct. 16th, 2010 in Amsterdam, Netherlands, but had to pull out at the last minute due to an injury. He was replaced by Derrick Noble.

== Personal life ==
Thompson and his wife live in Lake Elmo, Minnesota He is a founding partner of Casey Jones Law, which represents railroad employees who have been injured or discriminated against.

=== Nickname ===
Thompson was originally nicknamed "The Fainting Goat" by his teammates because he was frequently knocked out during training and would "faint away" like a fainting goat. As Thompson improved his defense and became less susceptible to knockouts, the nickname was shortened to "The Goat".

== Mixed martial arts record ==
Professional record breakdown
56 matches	41 wins	14 losses
By knockout	17	9
By submission	18	4
By decision	6	1
Draws	1	

Res.	Record	Opponent	Method	Event	Date	Round	Time	Location	Notes
Loss	38–14–1	Ben Askren	Decision (unanimous)	Bellator 40	April 9, 2011	3	5:00	Newkirk, Oklahoma, United States	
Loss	38–13–1	Taisuke Okuno	KO (punch)	World Victory Road Presents: Sengoku Raiden Championships 14	August 22, 2010	3	0:27	Saitama, Japan	
Loss	38–12–1	Dan Hornbuckle	TKO (punches)	World Victory Road Presents: Sengoku 10	September 23, 2009	2	1:30	Saitama, Japan	
Loss	38–11–1	Tim Kennedy	TKO (submission to punches)	Strikeforce Challengers: Villasenor vs. Cyborg	June 19, 2009	2	2:37	Kent, Washington, United States	Middleweight bout.
Win	38–10–1	Paul Daley	Decision (unanimous)	MFC 20	February 20, 2009	3	5:00	Edmonton, Alberta, Canada	
Win	37–10–1	Travis McCullough	TKO (submission to punches)	MT 18	January 17, 2009	1	2:38	Madison, Wisconsin, United States	
Loss	36–10–1	Jake Shields	Submission (guillotine choke)	EliteXC: Unfinished Business	July 26, 2008	1	1:03	Stockton, California, United States	For the EliteXC Welterweight Championship.
Win	36–9–1	Michael Costa	Submission (kimura)	World Victory Road Presents: Sengoku 3	June 8, 2008	2	4:13	Saitama, Japan	
Win	35–9–1	Fabricio Monteiro	Decision (unanimous)	World Victory Road Presents: Sengoku First Battle	March 5, 2008	3	5:00	Tokyo, Japan	
Win	34–9–1	John Troyer	Submission (rear-naked choke)	Bodog Fight: Thompson vs. Troyer	February 1, 2008	1	3:46	Las Vegas, Nevada, United States	Defended the Bodog Fight Welterweight Championship.
Win	33–9–1	Mark Weir	TKO (punches)	Bodog Fight: Vancouver	August 24, 2007	1	4:01	Vancouver, British Columbia, Canada	
Win	32–9–1	Eddie Alvarez	TKO (punches)	Bodog Fight: Clash of the Nations	April 14, 2007	2	4:32	St. Petersburg, Russia	Won the Bodog Fight Welterweight Championship.
Win	31–9–1	Dustin Denes	TKO (punches)	Bodog Fight: Costa Rica	February 18, 2007	1	1:27	Costa Rica	
Win	30–9–1	Ansar Chalangov	Submission (rear-naked choke)	Bodog Fight: USA vs Russia	December 2, 2006	1	4:59	St. Petersburg, Russia	
Win	29–9–1	Joe Winterfeldt	TKO (referee stoppage)	Twin Cities Throwdown 3	October 21, 2006	1	N/A	Burnsville, Minnesota, United States	
Win	28–9–1	Davion Peterson	Submission (rear-naked choke)	Bodog Fight: Costa Rica	August 22, 2006	3	N/A	Costa Rica	
Win	27–9–1	Steven Bratland	Submission (rear-naked choke)	XKK: St. Joseph	July 15, 2006	1	N/A	St. Joseph, Minnesota, United States	
Win	26–9–1	Yancy Cuellar	TKO (punches)	XKK: St. Joseph	July 15, 2006	1	N/A	St. Joseph, Minnesota, United States	
Win	25–9–1	Chris Wilson	Submission (kimura)	Absolute Fighting Championships 17	February 1, 2006	2	2:08	Fort Lauderdale, Florida, United States	
Loss	24–9–1	Karo Parisyan	TKO (submission to punches)	UFC 59: Reality Check	April 15, 2006	1	4:44	Anaheim, California, United States	
Win	24–8–1	Alex Carter	Submission (triangle choke)	EFX: Fury	December 2, 2006	1	N/A	Minnesota, United States	
Win	23–8–1	Anthony White	TKO (submission to punches)	Madtown Throwdown 6	January 13, 2006	1	N/A	Madison, Wisconsin, United States	
Win	22–8–1	Keith Wisniewski	Decision (unanimous)	UFC 56	November 19, 2005	3	5:00	Las Vegas, Nevada, United States	
Win	21–8–1	Josh Neer	Submission (rear-naked choke)	Extreme Challenge 64	October 15, 2005	2	2:19	Osceola, Iowa, United States	
Win	20–8–1	Dereck Keasley	Submission (choke)	Freestyle Fighting Championship 16	September 24, 2005	1	3:48	Tunica, Mississippi, United States	
Win	19–8–1	Victor Moreno	Submission (guillotine choke)	Freestyle Fighting Championship 16	September 24, 2005	2	0:52	Tunica, Mississippi, United States	
Win	18–8–1	Chris Connelly	Decision (unanimous)	Freestyle Fighting Championship 16	September 24, 2005	2	5:00	Tunica, Mississippi, United States	
Win	17–8–1	Brian Fitzsimmons	KO (punches)	Madtown Throwdown 4	July 9, 2005	1	N/A	Madison, Wisconsin, United States	
Loss	16–8–1	Ed Herman	TKO (injury)	Hand 2 Hand Combat	June 17, 2005	1	N/A	Canton, Ohio, United States	
Loss	16–7–1	Yushin Okami	Submission (elbow injury)	GCM: D.O.G. 2	June 11, 2005	1	0:29	Tokyo, Japan	
Win	16–6–1	Marcel Ferreira	TKO (punches)	Absolute Fighting Championships 12	April 30, 2005	3	2:48	Fort Lauderdale, Florida, United States	
Win	15–6–1	Joey Clark	Submission (armbar)	XKK: St. Paul	April 23, 2005	1	3:01	St. Paul, Minnesota, United States	
Win	14–6–1	Nuri Shakir	Submission (triangle choke)	CZ 10: Ground War	April 2, 2005	2	3:07	Revere, Massachusetts, United States	Won the vacant CZ Welterweight Championship.
Loss	13–6–1	Paul Purcell	KO (punches)	Freestyle Combat Challenge 18	March 5, 2005	2	N/A	Racine, Wisconsin, United States	
Win	13–5–1	Brian Green	TKO (punches)	Madtown Throwdown 2	February 19, 2005	1	N/A	Madison, Wisconsin, United States	
Win	12–5–1	Brian Gassaway	Decision (unanimous)	Combat: Do Fighting Challenge 2	February 5, 2005	3	3:00	Illinois, United States	
Win	11–5–1	Jesse Chilton	Submission (rear-naked choke)	Freestyle Combat Challenge 17	January 8, 2005	3	N/A	Racine, Wisconsin, United States	
Win	10–5–1	Darren Hines	Submission (guillotine choke)	Xtreme Fighting Organization 4	December 3, 2004	1	0:19	McHenry, Illinois, United States	
Draw	9–5–1	Daryl Guthmiller	Draw	XKK: Fridley	November 5, 2004	3	5:00	Fridley, Minnesota, United States	
Loss	9–5	Brian Ebersole	TKO (punches)	Freestyle Fighting Championships 12	September 24, 2004	1	N/A	Racine, Wisconsin, United States	
Win	9–4	Sean Huffman	Submission (choke)	Freestyle Fighting Championships 12	September 24, 2004	2	N/A	Racine, Wisconsin, United States	
Win	8–4	John Renken	TKO (punches)	Freestyle Fighting Championships 12	September 24, 2004	1	N/A	Racine, Wisconsin, United States	
Win	7–4	Ricky Seleuce	Submission (twister)	Madtown Throwdown 1	August 21, 2004	1	N/A	Madison, Wisconsin, United States	
Win	6–4	Thiago Goncalves	TKO (submission to punches)	Freestyle Combat Challenge 15	June 12, 2004	2	2:39	Racine, Wisconsin, United States	
Win	5–4	Brian Moore	Submission (guillotine choke)	Ultimate Battleground	June 4, 2004	1	0:28	Madison, Wisconsin, United States	
Win	4–4	Jeff Doyle	TKO (corner stoppage)	XKK: Mayhem in Marshfield	May 15, 2004	2	N/A	Marshfield, Wisconsin, United States	
Loss	3–4	Mike Quinlan	Submission (rear-naked choke)	Absolute Fighting Championships 8	May 1, 2004	2	0:16	Fort Lauderdale, Florida, United States	
Win	3–3	Emyr Bussade	Decision (unanimous)	Freestyle Combat Challenge 14	March 6, 2004	2	5:00	Racine, Wisconsin, United States	
Win	2–3	Kyle Helsper	Submission (rear-naked choke)	Freestyle Combat Challenge 13	January 10, 2004	2	2:16	Racine, Wisconsin, United States	
Loss	1–3	Dan Hart	Submission (guillotine choke)	Freestyle Combat Challenge 12	October 18, 2003	1	0:17	Racine, Wisconsin, United States	
Loss	1–2	Dustin Denes	Submission (triangle choke)	Absolute Fighting Championships 5	September 5, 2003	1	1:45	Fort Lauderdale, Florida, United States	
Win	1–1	Kyle Helsper	TKO (submission to punches)	Freestyle Combat Challenge 11	June 28, 2003	1	N/A	Racine, Wisconsin, United States	
Loss	0–1	Dan Hart	KO (punches)	Freestyle Combat Challenge 10	March 22, 2003	1	N/A	Racine, Wisconsin, United States	

== See also ==
- List of male mixed martial artists
