= World Victory Road =

MMA promoter based in Japan

- Company type: Private
- Industry: Mixed martial arts promotion
- Founded: 2007
- Defunct: 2011
- Headquarters: Tokyo, Japan
- Website: http://www.src-official.com/pc/

World Victory Road (WVR) was a Japanese mixed martial arts (MMA) organization which promoted the Sengoku Raiden Championship (SRC) in Japan. The organization was formed in 2007 following the purchase of PRIDE FC by Zuffa. It operated in conjunction with the Japan Mixed Martial Arts Federation (JMM). The Sengoku championship was broadcast on Fuji TV and pay-per-view in Japan, and on HDNet in United States.

Beginning with the December 31 show, Sengoku was known as Sengoku Raiden Championship. "Raiden" means "thunder and lightning" and refers to legendary 18th century rikishi, Raiden Tameemon. WVR exec Kokuho said they hoped the initials "SRC" will be more palatable to international audiences.

On March 12, 2011, it was reported that Don Quijote, a Japanese discount store chain serving as the primary sponsor of the promotion, had ceased all funding to WVR. That same day, WVR officials issued a press release stating that, barring the sudden emergence of a new primary sponsor, the promotion was effectively finished.

== Broadcast ==
The promotion received a boost in visibility in their endeavor to compete with DREAM when it reached a broadcast agreement for Fuji TV to televise matches in Japan. It was significant given the fact that this is the first MMA promotion to be televised on the network since it dropped PRIDE FC from its lineup in mid-2006. The events will be shown live on Fuji TV 739 and then a two-hour version later in the night on Fuji TV.

On February 6, 2009, HDNet announced they had reached and agreement with WVR to broadcast its Sengoku-events in America starting March 20, 2009.

== Rules ==
WVR's rules differ somewhat from the Mixed martial arts rules#Unified Rules of Mixed Martial Arts. Among the differences are the allowance of knees and stomps to the head of downed opponent while elbows to the head and soccer kicks are prohibited. Similar to the Unified Rules, fights have three rounds each lasting five minutes.

== Sengoku events ==
| # | Event title | Date | Arena | Location |
|---|---|---|---|---|
| 20 | World Victory Road Presents: Soul of Fight | December 30, 2010 | Ariake Coliseum | Tokyo, Japan |
| 19 | World Victory Road Presents: Sengoku Raiden Championships 15 | October 30, 2010 | Ryogoku Kokugikan | Tokyo, Japan |
| 18 | World Victory Road Presents: Sengoku Raiden Championships 14 | August 22, 2010 | Ryogoku Kokugikan | Tokyo, Japan |
| 17 | World Victory Road Presents: Asia Vol. 1 | July 4, 2010 | Differ Ariake | Tokyo, Japan |
| 16 | World Victory Road Presents: Sengoku Raiden Championships 13 | June 20, 2010 | Ryogoku Kokugikan | Tokyo, Japan |
| 15 | World Victory Road Presents: Sengoku Raiden Championships 12 | March 7, 2010 | Ryogoku Kokugikan | Tokyo, Japan |
| 15 | Dynamite!! The Power of Courage 2009 | December 31, 2009 | Saitama Super Arena | Saitama, Japan |
| 14 | World Victory Road Presents: Sengoku 11 | November 7, 2009 | Ryogoku Kokugikan | Tokyo, Japan |
| 13 | World Victory Road Presents: Sengoku 10 | September 23, 2009 | Saitama Super Arena | Saitama City, Japan |
| 12 | World Victory Road Presents: Sengoku 9 | September 2, 2009 | Saitama Super Arena | Saitama City, Japan |
| 11 | World Victory Road Presents: Sengoku Gold Cup Semi Finals | June 16, 2009 | PS Lab | Yokohama, Japan |
| 10 | World Victory Road Presents: Sengoku 8 | May 2, 2009 | Yoyogi National Gymnasium | Tokyo, Japan |
| 9 | World Victory Road Presents: Sengoku 7 | March 20, 2009 | Yoyogi National Gymnasium | Tokyo, Japan |
| 8 | World Victory Road Presents: Gold Rush Korea | March 11, 2009 | Team Maru Training Center | Seoul, South Korea |
| 7 | World Victory Road Presents: Sengoku no Ran 2009 | January 4, 2009 | Saitama Super Arena | Saitama City, Japan |
| 6 | World Victory Road Presents: Sengoku 6 | November 1, 2008 | Saitama Super Arena | Saitama City, Japan |
| 5 | World Victory Road Presents: Sengoku 5 | September 28, 2008 | Yoyogi National Gymnasium | Tokyo, Japan |
| 4 | World Victory Road Presents: Sengoku 4 | September 24, 2008 | Saitama Super Arena | Saitama City, Japan |
| 3 | World Victory Road Presents: Sengoku 3 | June 8, 2008 | Saitama Super Arena | Saitama City, Japan |
| 2 | World Victory Road Presents: Sengoku 2 | May 18, 2008 | Ariake Coliseum | Tokyo, Japan |
| 1 | World Victory Road Presents: Sengoku First Battle | March 5, 2008 | Yoyogi National Gymnasium | Tokyo, Japan |

== Notable fighters ==
=== Final champions ===
| Division | Upper weight limit | Champion | Since | Title Defenses |
|---|---|---|---|---|
| Featherweight | 65 kg (143.3 lb) | Vacant | 25 June 2011 | |
| Lightweight | 70 kg (154.3 lb) | Vacant | 7 March 2010 (Sengoku Raiden Championship 12) | |
| Welterweight | 77 kg (169.8 lb) | (Japan) Keita Nakamura | 30 December 2010 (Soul of Fight) | 0 |
| Middleweight | 84 kg (185.2 lb) | Vacant | 8 February 2011 | |

=== Notable fighters ===
- (Japan) Yoshihiro Nakao – Former PRIDE fighter
- (Japan) Sanae Kikuta – Former ADCC Submission Wrestling World Champion
- (Japan) Hidehiko Yoshida – 1992 Judo Olympic Gold Medalist -78 kg
- (Japan) Kazuo Misaki – 2006 PRIDE Welterweight Grand Prix winner
- (Japan) Makoto Takimoto – 2000 Judo -81 kg Olympic Gold Medalist
- (Japan) Satoru Kitaoka – Sengoku Lightweight Grand Prix and former Lightweight champion
- (Japan) Hatsu Hioki – Current TKO Featherweight Champion
- (Japan) Satoshi Ishii – 2008 Olympic Judo Gold Medalist +99 kg
- (Japan) Eiji Mitsuoka – Former PRIDE fighter
- (Japan) Kazuyuki Fujita – Former PRIDE fighter
- (Japan) Satoshi Ishii − 2008 Judo Olympic Gold Medalist +100 kg
- (United States) Muhammed Lawal – a.k.a. King Mo Former NCAA Division II Champion, 2004 U.S. Olympic alternate -84 kg
- (United States) Kevin Randleman – Former UFC Heavyweight Champion
- (United States) Travis Wiuff – YAMMA Pit Fighting Heavyweight Tournament Champion
- (United States) Nick Thompson – Former BodogFight welterweight champion
- (United States) Josh Barnett – former UFC heavyweight champion, PRIDE veteran
- (United States) Jeff Monson – 2005 –99 kg ADCC champion
- (United States) Dave Herman – Elite XC, and Bellator veteran
- (United States) Logan Clark – UFC and WEC veteran
- (Brazil) Antônio Silva – Last EliteXC Heavyweight Champion
- (Brazil) Xande Ribeiro – 2007 –99 kg ADCC champion
- (Brazil) Antonio Braga Neto – 2008 World Jiu-Jitsu Gold Medalist
- (Brazil) Evangelista Santos – Former PRIDE fighter
- (South Korea) Chan Sung Jung – 2007 Pancrase Korea Neo-Blood Tournament Champion
- (South Korea) Mu Bae Choi – 1990 Asian Games -100 kg Greco-Roman wrestling Medalist
- (Poland) Paweł Nastula – 1995 and 1997 Judo World Champion, 1996 Olympic Gold Medalist, -99 kg
- (Poland) Mamed Khalidov – KSW champion, EliteXC veteran
- (Bulgaria) Stanislav Nedkov – Bulgarian jiu jitsu champion
- (Bulgaria) Blagoi Ivanov – 2008 World Sambo champion, +99 kg
- (Morocco) Badr Hari − K-1 World Grand Prix 2008 & 2009 Finalist
- (Venezuela) Maximo Blanco -2007 Pan American Games Bronze Medalist, Lightweight King of Pancrase and current UFC fighter.
