= Pride Shockwave 2006 =

Pride FC MMA event in 2006

Pride: Shockwave 2006
- The poster for Pride: Shockwave 2006
- Promotion: Pride Fighting Championships
- Date: December 31, 2006
- Venue: Saitama Super Arena
- City: Saitama, Japan
- Attendance: 48,709

Event chronology
Pride: Bushido 13	Pride: Shockwave 2006	Pride 33

Pride Shockwave 2006 was a mixed martial arts event held by Pride Fighting Championships on December 31, 2006.

== Background ==
The main event was scheduled to be heavyweight Champion Fedor Emelianenko defending his heavyweight championship against the winner of the Absolute Grand Prix, but Mirko Filipović was recovering from foot surgery he underwent on October 26 and could not fight at Shockwave.

Josh Barnett, the Absolute Grand Prix runner up, was also a contender to face Emelianenko, as mentioned by the heavyweight champion in a Pride 32 post-fight press conference, but was "not in the best condition" to compete and instead fought Antônio Rodrigo Nogueira in a rematch and lost that fight to. Ultimately, Fedor defended his title against Mark Hunt.

The event was the first outside of tournaments, title bouts, and fights under the NSAC jurisdiction to feature concrete weight classes. All Lightweight (-73 kg) and Welterweight (-83 kg) bouts were fought under Bushido rules with one ten-minute and one five-minute round. The sole exception however was the fight between Minowa and Tamura, as both had requested to fight under full Pride rules as well as fight in the opening fight of the night.

The gospel choir during the opening ceremony was led by Mika Arisaka and Fubito Endo.

== Results ==
Main card
Weight class				Method	Round	Time	Notes
Heavyweight	Fedor Emelianenko (c)	def.	Mark Hunt	Submission (kimura)	1	8:16	(Note: For the Pride Heavyweight Championship.)
Heavyweight	Antônio Rodrigo Nogueira	def.	Josh Barnett	Decision (unanimous)	3	5:00
Heavyweight	James Thompson	def.	Hidehiko Yoshida	TKO (punches)	1	7:50
Lightweight	Takanori Gomi	def.	Mitsuhiro Ishida	TKO (soccer kicks and punches)	1	1:14	(Note: Non-title bout.)
Heavyweight	Kazuyuki Fujita	def.	Eldar Kurtanidze	TKO (Submission to punches)	1	2:09
Lightweight	Gilbert Melendez	def.	Tatsuya Kawajiri	Decision (unanimous)	2	5:00
Middleweight	Maurício Rua	def.	Kazuhiro Nakamura	Decision (unanimous)	3	5:00
Welterweight	Akihiro Gono	def.	Yuki Kondo	Decision (split)	2	5:00
Lightweight	Shinya Aoki	def.	Joachim Hansen	Submission (gogoplata)	1	2:24
Welterweight	Kiyoshi Tamura	def.	Ikuhisa Minowa	KO (soccer kicks)	1	1:18

== See also ==
- Pride Fighting Championships
- List of Pride Fighting Championships champions
- List of Pride FC events
- 2006 in Pride FC
