= 2006 in Pride FC =

Mixed martial arts events

Information
- First date: February 26, 2006
- Last date: December 31, 2006

Events
- Total events: 10

Fights
- Total fights: 101
- Title fights: 2

Chronology
2005 in Pride	2006 in Pride FC	2007 in Pride

The year 2006 was the 10th year in the history of the Pride Fighting Championships, a mixed martial arts promotion based in Japan. 2006 had 10 events beginning with, Pride 31 - Unbreakable.

== Title fights ==
Title fights in 2006
Weight class				Method	Round	Time	Event	Notes
Lightweight	Takanori Gomi (c)	def.	Marcus Aurelio	Decision (Split)	2	5:00	Pride - Bushido 13	(Note: For the Pride Fighting Championship World Lightweight Championship.)
Heavyweight	Fedor Emelianenko (c)	def.	Mark Hunt	Submission (Kimura)	1	8:16	Pride FC - Shockwave 2006	(Note: For the Pride Fighting Championship World Heavyweight Championship.)

== Debut Pride FC fighters ==
The following fighters fought their first Pride FC fight in 2006:

- Clay French
- Cristiano Marcello
- Cyrille Diabate
- Dae Won Kim
- David Baron
- David Bielkheden
- Edson Claas Vieira
- Eldari Kurtanidze
- Eric Esch
- Eun-Su Lee
- Evangelista Santos
- Gegard Mousasi
- Gilbert Melendez
- Gregory Bouchelaghem
- Hatsu Hioki
- Hector Lombard
- Jason Black
- Jean-Francois Lenogue
- Jeff Curran
- Joe Pearson
- Joey Villasenor
- John Olav Einemo
- Kenji Arai
- Luciano Azevedo
- Mark Weir
- Mike Plotcheck
- Mitsuhiro Ishida
- Naoki Matsushita
- Nobuhiro Obiya
- Olaf Alfonso
- Paul Rodriguez
- Robbie Lawler
- Sean O'Haire
- Seichi Ikemoto
- Shinya Aoki
- Tae Hyun Lee
- Travis Galbraith
- Won Jin Eoh
- Yoshihiro Nakao
- Yosuke Nishijima

== Events list ==
#	Event	Japanese name	Date held	Venue	City	Attendance
66	Pride FC - Shockwave 2006	Otoko Matsuri - Fumetsu	December 31, 2006	Saitama Super Arena	Saitama, Japan	48,709
65	Pride FC - Bushido 13	—N/a	November 5, 2006	Yokohama Arena	Yokohama, Japan	—N/a
64	Pride 32 - The Real Deal	—N/a	October 21, 2006	Thomas & Mack Center	Las Vegas, Nevada, United States	11,727
63	Pride FC - Final Conflict Absolute	—N/a	September 10, 2006	Saitama Super Arena	Saitama, Japan	—N/a
62	Pride FC - Bushido 12	2nd Round	August 27, 2006	Nagoya Rainbow Hall	Nagoya, Japan	—N/a
61	Pride FC - Critical Countdown Absolute	—N/a	July 1, 2006	Saitama Super Arena	Saitama, Japan	—N/a
60	Pride FC - Bushido 11	—N/a	June 4, 2006	Saitama Super Arena	Saitama, Japan	—N/a
59	Pride FC - Total Elimination Absolute	—N/a	May 5, 2006	Osaka Dome	Osaka, Japan	—N/a
58	Pride FC - Bushido 10	—N/a	April 2, 2006	Ariake Coliseum	Tokyo, Japan	—N/a
57	Pride 31 - Unbreakable	Dreamers	February 26, 2006	Saitama Super Arena	Saitama, Japan	—N/a

== Pride 31: Unbreakable ==
Pride 31
- Promotion: Pride Fighting Championships
- Date: February 26, 2006
- Venue: Saitama Super Arena
- City: Saitama

Event chronology
Pride: Shockwave 2005	Pride 31	Pride: Bushido 10

Pride 31: Unbreakable was an event held on February 26, 2006, at the Saitama Super Arena in Saitama, Japan.

=== Results ===
Main Card
Weight class				Method	Round	Time	Notes
	(New Zealand) Mark Hunt	def.	(Japan) Yosuke Nishijima	KO (Punch)	3	1:18
	(United States) Mark Coleman	def.	(Brazil) Maurício Rua	TKO (Broken Arm)	1	0:49
	(Brazil) Antônio Rodrigo Nogueira	def.	(Japan) Kiyoshi Tamura	Submission (Armbar)	1	2:24
	(United States) Josh Barnett	def.	(Japan) Kazuhiro Nakamura	Submission (Rear-Naked Choke)	1	8:10
	(Netherlands) Alistair Overeem	def.	(Russia) Sergei Kharitonov	TKO (Knees)	1	5:13
	(Japan) Tsuyoshi Kosaka	def.	(Brazil) Mario Sperry	TKO (Punches)	1	1:20
	(Brazil) Fabrício Werdum	def.	(Norway) John Olav Einemo	Decision (Unanimous)	3	5:00
	(United States) Quinton Jackson	def.	(South Korea) Dong Sik Yoon	Decision (Unanimous)	3	5:00
	(Russia) Roman Zentsov	def.	(Brazil) Pedro Rizzo	KO (Punch)	1	0:25

== Pride FC: Bushido 10 ==
Pride: Bushido 10
- Promotion: Pride Fighting Championships
- Date: April 2, 2006
- Venue: Ariake Coliseum
- City: Tokyo

Event chronology
Pride 31	Pride: Bushido 10	Pride: Total Elimination Absolute

Pride FC: Bushido 10 was an event held on April 2, 2006, at Ariake Coliseum in Tokyo, Japan.

=== Results ===
Main Card
Weight class				Method	Round	Time	Notes
	(Brazil) Marcus Aurelio	def.	(Japan) Takanori Gomi	Technical Submission (Arm-Triangle Choke)	1	4:34
	(United States) Dan Henderson	def.	(Japan) Kazuo Misaki	Decision (Unanimous)	2	5:00
	(Japan) Ikuhisa Minowa	def.	(Brazil) Paulo Cesar Silva	TKO (Knees)	1	2:23
	(United States) Phil Baroni	def.	(Japan) Yuki Kondo	KO (Punch)	1	0:25
	(Japan) Akihiro Gono	def.	(South Korea) Dae Won Kim	Submission (Armbar)	1	9:00
	(Brazil) Paulo Filho	def.	(Brazil) Murilo Rua	Decision (Unanimous)	2	5:00
	(Norway) Joachim Hansen	def.	(Brazil) Luiz Azeredo	KO (Knee)	1	7:09
	(Canada) Denis Kang	def.	(United Kingdom) Mark Weir	Submission (Knees)	1	4:55
	(United States) Jens Pulver	def.	(Japan) Kenji Arai	KO (Soccer Kick)	1	3:59
	(Japan) Mitsuhiro Ishida	def.	(United States) Paul Rodriguez	Submission (Guillotine Choke)	1	2:29
	(The Bahamas) Yves Edwards	def.	(Japan) Seichi Ikemoto	Decision (Unanimous)	2	5:00

== Pride FC: Total Elimination Absolute ==
Pride: Total Elimination Absolute
- Promotion: Pride Fighting Championships
- Date: May 5, 2006
- Venue: Osaka Dome
- City: Osaka

Event chronology
Pride: Bushido 10	Pride: Total Elimination Absolute	Pride: Bushido 11

Pride FC: Total Elimination Absolute was an event held on May 5, 2006, at Osaka Dome in Osaka, Japan.

This event featured the first round of Pride's 2006 Open-Weight tournament. Seven tournament matches were held along with one alternate match. The seven winning participants advanced to the second round, Pride Critical Countdown Absolute. The winner of the alternate bout will take the place of any fighter who is unable to participate in subsequent matches.

Pride Heavyweight Champion and 2004 Heavyweight Grand Prix winner Fedor Emelianenko was originally set to enter the tournament with a first round bye, but a hand injury prevented him from participating. Wanderlei Silva, then current Pride middleweight champion, received his bye into the second round.

=== Results ===
Openweight Grand Prix Opening Round
Weight class				Method	Round	Time	Notes
Openweight	Hidehiko Yoshida	def.	Yosuke Nishijima	Submission (Triangle Choke)	1	2:33
	Antônio Rodrigo Nogueira	def.	Wagner da Conceicao Martins	Submission (Armbar)	1	2:17
	Mirko Cro Cop	def.	Ikuhisa Minowa	TKO (Punches)	1	1:10
	Kazuyuki Fujita	def.	James Thompson	KO (Punch)	1	8:25
	Josh Barnett	def.	Alexander Emelianenko	Submission (Keylock)	2	1:57
	Mark Hunt	def.	Tsuyoshi Kosaka	TKO (Punches)	2	4:15
	Fabrício Werdum	def.	Alistair Overeem	Submission (Kimura)	2	3:43
Alternate Bout
	Roman Zentsov	def.	Gilbert Yvel	KO (Punch)	1	4:55

=== 2006 Pride Open-Weight Grand Prix Bracket ===
Pride: Total Elimination Absolute
(United States)	Josh Barnett	SUB
(Russia)	Alexander Emelianenko	11:57
(New Zealand)	Mark Hunt	TKO
(Japan)	Tsuyoshi Kohsaka	14:15
(Brazil)	Fabrício Werdum	SUB
(Netherlands)	Alistair Overeem	13:43
(Brazil)	Antônio Rodrigo Nogueira	SUB
(Brazil)	Wagner da Conceicao Martins	2:17
(Croatia)	Mirko Cro Cop	TKO
(Japan)	Ikuhisa Minowa	1:10
(Japan)	Hidehiko Yoshida	SUB
(Japan)	Yosuke Nishijima	2:33
(Japan)	Kazuyuki Fujita	KO
(England)	James Thompson	8:25
(Russia)	Fedor Emelianenko	BYE

Pride: Critical Countdown Absolute
(United States)	Josh Barnett
(New Zealand)	Mark Hunt
(Brazil)	Fabrício Werdum
(Brazil)	Antônio Rodrigo Nogueira
(Croatia)	Mirko Cro Cop
(Japan)	Hidehiko Yoshida
(Japan)	Kazuyuki Fujita
(Brazil)	Wanderlei Silva^{1}

Pride: Final Conflict Absolute

Pride: Final Conflict Absolute

^{1}Fedor Emelianenko suffered a hand injury and could not participate in the tournament. He was replaced by Wanderlei Silva.

== Pride FC: Bushido 11 ==
Pride: Bushido 11
- Promotion: Pride Fighting Championships
- Date: June 4, 2006
- Venue: Saitama Super Arena
- City: Saitama

Event chronology
Pride: Total Elimination Absolute	Pride: Bushido 11	Pride: Critical Countdown Absolute

Pride FC: Bushido 11 was an event held on June 4, 2006, at Saitama Super Arena in Saitama, Japan.

=== Results ===
Welterweight Grand Prix Opening round
Weight class				Method	Round	Time	Notes
Welterweight	Kazuo Misaki	def.	Phil Baroni	Decision (Unanimous)	2	5:00
Welterweight	Denis Kang	def.	Murilo Rua	KO (Punches)	1	0:15
Welterweight	Akihiro Gono	def.	Hector Lombard	Decision (Unanimous)	2	5:00
Welterweight	Gegard Mousasi	def.	Makoto Takimoto	TKO (Broken Eye Socket)	1	5:34
Welterweight	Ryo Chonan	def.	Joey Villasenor	Decision (Split)	2	5:00
Welterweight	Paulo Filho	def.	Gregory Bouchelaghem	Decision (Unanimous)	2	5:00
Welterweight	Amar Suloev	def.	Murilo Bustamante	Decision (Unanimous)	2	5:00
Non Tournament Bouts
	Hayato Sakurai	def.	Olaf Alfonso	KO (Punch)	1	1:54
	Tatsuya Kawajiri	def.	Charles Bennett	Submission (Kneebar)	1	2:30
	Mitsuhiro Ishida	def.	Marcus Aurelio	Decision (Unanimous)	2	5:00
	Jason Black	def.	Won Jin Eoh	TKO (Corner Stoppage)	1	4:25

=== Pride 2006 Welterweight Grand Prix Bracket ===
Pride: Bushido 11
(Japan)	Kazuo Misaki	UD
(United States)	Phil Baroni	15:00
(United States)	Dan Henderson	BYE
(Japan)	Ryo Chonan	DD
(United States)	Joey Villasenor	15:00
(Brazil)	Paulo Filho	UD
(France)	Gregory Bouchelaghem	15:00
(Japan)	Akihiro Gono	UD
(Cuba)	Hector Lombard	15:00
(Netherlands)	Gegard Mousasi	TKO
(Japan)	Makoto Takimoto	5:34
(Armenia)	Amar Suloev	UD
(Brazil)	Murilo Bustamante	15:00
(Canada)	Denis Kang	KO
(Brazil)	Murilo Rua	0:15

Pride: Bushido 12
(Japan)	Kazuo Misaki
(United States)	Dan Henderson
(Japan)	Ryo Chonan
(Brazil)	Paulo Filho
(Japan)	Akihiro Gono
(Netherlands)	Gegard Mousasi
(Armenia)	Amar Suloev
(Canada)	Denis Kang

Pride: Bushido 13

Pride: Bushido 13

== Pride FC: Critical Countdown Absolute ==
Pride: Critical Countdown Absolute
- Promotion: Pride Fighting Championships
- Date: July 1, 2006
- Venue: Saitama Super Arena
- City: Saitama

Event chronology
Pride: Bushido 11	Pride: Critical Countdown Absolute	Pride: Bushido 12

Pride FC: Critical Countdown Absolute was an event held on July 1, 2006, at Saitama Super Arena in Saitama, Japan.

=== Results ===
Openweight Grand Prix Quarterfinals
Weight class				Method	Round	Time	Notes
Openweight	Mirko Cro Cop	def.	Hidehiko Yoshida	TKO (Leg Kicks)	1	7:38
Openweight	Josh Barnett	def.	Mark Hunt	Submission (Kimura)	1	2:02
Openweight	Wanderlei Silva	def.	Kazuyuki Fujita	TKO (Punches and Soccer Kicks)	1	9:21
Openweight	Antônio Rodrigo Nogueira	def.	Fabrício Werdum	Decision (Unanimous)	3	5:00
Non Tournament Bouts
Middleweight	Kazuhiro Nakamura	def.	Evangelista Santos	Submission (Keylock)	1	4:49
Light Heavyweight	Antônio Rogério Nogueira	def.	Alistair Overeem	TKO (Corner Stoppage)	2	2:13
Light Heavyweight	Vitor Belfort	def.	Kazuo Takahashi	KO (Punch)	1	0:36
Heavyweight	Yoshihiro Nakao	def.	Eun-Su Lee	TKO (Doctor Stoppage)	1	4:16
Heavyweight	Pawel Nastula	def.	Edson Claas Vieira	Submission (Armbar)	1	4:33

=== 2006 Pride Open-Weight Grand Prix Bracket ===
Pride: Total Elimination Absolute
(United States)	Josh Barnett	SUB
(Russia)	Alexander Emelianenko	11:57
(New Zealand)	Mark Hunt	TKO
(Japan)	Tsuyoshi Kohsaka	14:15
(Brazil)	Fabrício Werdum	SUB
(Netherlands)	Alistair Overeem	13:43
(Brazil)	Antônio Rodrigo Nogueira	SUB
(Brazil)	Wagner da Conceicao Martins	2:17
(Croatia)	Mirko Cro Cop	TKO
(Japan)	Ikuhisa Minowa	1:10
(Japan)	Hidehiko Yoshida	SUB
(Japan)	Yosuke Nishijima	2:33
(Japan)	Kazuyuki Fujita	KO
(England)	James Thompson	8:25
(Russia)	Fedor Emelianenko	BYE

Pride: Critical Countdown Absolute
(United States)	Josh Barnett	SUB
(New Zealand)	Mark Hunt	2:02
(Brazil)	Fabrício Werdum	20:00
(Brazil)	Antônio Rodrigo Nogueira	UD
(Croatia)	Mirko Cro Cop	TKO
(Japan)	Hidehiko Yoshida	7:38
(Japan)	Kazuyuki Fujita	9:21
(Brazil)	Wanderlei Silva^{1}	TKO

Pride: Final Conflict Absolute
(United States)	Josh Barnett
(Brazil)	Antônio Rodrigo Nogueira
(Croatia)	Mirko Cro Cop
(Brazil)	Wanderlei Silva

Pride: Final Conflict Absolute

^{1}Fedor Emelianenko suffered a hand injury and could not participate in the tournament. He was replaced by Wanderlei Silva.

== Pride FC: Bushido 12 ==
Pride: Bushido 12
- Promotion: Pride Fighting Championships
- Date: August 26, 2006
- Venue: Nagoya Rainbow Hall
- City: Nagoya

Event chronology
Pride: Critical Countdown Absolute	Pride: Bushido 12	Pride: Final Conflict Absolute

Pride FC: Bushido 12 was an event held on August 27, 2006, at Nagoya Rainbow Hall in Nagoya, Japan.

=== Results ===
Welterweight Grand Prix Quarterfinals
Weight class				Method	Round	Time	Notes
Welterweight	Kazuo Misaki	def.	Dan Henderson	Decision (Unanimous)	2	5:00
Welterweight	Akihiro Gono	def.	Gegard Mousasi	Submission (Armbar)	2	4:24
Welterweight	Paulo Filho	def.	Ryo Chonan	Submission (Armbar)	1	2:30
Welterweight	Denis Kang	def.	Amar Suloev	Submission (Rear-Naked Choke)	1	4:10
Non Tournament Bouts
	Takanori Gomi	def.	David Baron	Submission (Rear-Naked Choke)	1	7:10
	Ikuhisa Minowa	def.	Eric Esch	Submission (Armbar)	1	4:25
	Hayato Sakurai	def.	Luciano Azevedo	TKO (Doctor Stoppage)	1	4:35
	Mitsuhiro Ishida	def.	Cristiano Marcello	Decision (Unanimous)	2	5:00
	Tatsuya Kawajiri	def.	Chris Brennan	TKO (Knee and Punches)	1	0:29
	Gilbert Melendez	def.	Nobuhiro Obiya	Decision (Unanimous)	2	5:00
	Shinya Aoki	def.	Jason Black	Submission (Triangle Choke)	1	1:58
	Hatsu Hioki	def.	Jeff Curran	Decision (Unanimous)	2	5:00
	Hiroyuki Abe	vs.	Naoki Matsushita	Draw	2	5:00
	Daisuke Nakamura	def.	Seichi Ikemoto	Submission (Armbar)	1	3:36

=== Pride 2006 Welterweight Grand Prix Bracket ===
Pride: Bushido 11
(Japan)	Kazuo Misaki	UD
(United States)	Phil Baroni	15:00
(United States)	Dan Henderson	BYE
(Japan)	Ryo Chonan	DD
(United States)	Joey Villasenor	15:00
(Brazil)	Paulo Filho	UD
(France)	Gregory Bouchelaghem	15:00
(Japan)	Akihiro Gono	UD
(Cuba)	Hector Lombard	15:00
(Netherlands)	Gegard Mousasi	TKO
(Japan)	Makoto Takimoto	5:34
(Armenia)	Amar Suloev	UD
(Brazil)	Murilo Bustamante	15:00
(Canada)	Denis Kang	KO
(Brazil)	Murilo Rua	0:15

Pride: Bushido 12
(Japan)	Kazuo Misaki	UD
(United States)	Dan Henderson	15:00
(Japan)	Ryo Chonan	2:30
(Brazil)	Paulo Filho	SUB
(Japan)	Akihiro Gono	SUB
(Netherlands)	Gegard Mousasi	4:24
(Armenia)	Amar Suloev	4:10
(Canada)	Denis Kang	SUB

Pride: Bushido 13
(Japan)	Kazuo Misaki
(Brazil)	Paulo Filho
(Japan)	Akihiro Gono
(Canada)	Denis Kang

Pride: Bushido 13

== Pride FC: Final Conflict Absolute ==
Pride: Final Conflict Absolute
- Promotion: Pride Fighting Championships
- Date: September 10, 2006
- Venue: Saitama Super Arena
- City: Saitama

Event chronology
Pride: Bushido 12	Pride: Final Conflict Absolute	Pride 32

Pride FC: Final Conflict Absolute was an event held on September 10, 2006, at Saitama Super Arena in Saitama, Japan.

This event comprised the semifinal and final rounds of the Pride Open-Weight Grand Prix tournament. The tournament began on May 5, 2006, at the Total Elimination Absolute event and then continued on July 1, 2006, at Critical Countdown Absolute.

On August 5, 2006, Mirko Cro Cop announced his withdrawal from the tournament following a dispute over pay with Pride. On August 7, 2006, it was reported that the matter had been resolved and Cro Cop would once again take his place in the finals.

=== Results ===
Openweight Grand Prix Finals
Weight class				Method	Round	Time	Notes
Openweight	Mirko Cro Cop	def.	Josh Barnett	TKO (Submission to Punches)	1	7:32
Openweight Grand Prix Semifinals
Openweight	Josh Barnett	def.	Antônio Rodrigo Nogueira	Decision (Split)	2	5:00
Openweight	Mirko Cro Cop	def.	Wanderlei Silva	KO (Head Kick)	1	5:26
Non Tournament Bouts
Light Heavyweight	Ricardo Arona	def.	Alistair Overeem	TKO (Submission to Punches)	1	4:28
Light Heavyweight	Maurício Rua	def.	Cyrille Diabate	TKO (Stomps)	1	5:29
Middleweight	Kazuhiro Nakamura	def.	Yoshihiro Nakao	Decision (Unanimous)	3	5:00
Heavyweight	Ricardo Morais	def.	Tae Hyun Lee	TKO (Corner Stoppage)	1	8:08
Heavyweight	Alexander Emelianenko	def.	Sergei Kharitonov	TKO (Punches)	1	6:45
Middleweight	Evangelista Santos	def.	Yosuke Nishijima	Submission (Rear-Naked Choke)	1	3:24

=== 2006 Pride Open-Weight Grand Prix Bracket ===
Pride: Total Elimination Absolute
(United States)	Josh Barnett	SUB
(Russia)	Alexander Emelianenko	11:57
(New Zealand)	Mark Hunt	TKO
(Japan)	Tsuyoshi Kohsaka	14:15
(Brazil)	Fabrício Werdum	SUB
(Netherlands)	Alistair Overeem	13:43
(Brazil)	Antônio Rodrigo Nogueira	SUB
(Brazil)	Wagner da Conceicao Martins	2:17
(Croatia)	Mirko Cro Cop	TKO
(Japan)	Ikuhisa Minowa	1:10
(Japan)	Hidehiko Yoshida	SUB
(Japan)	Yosuke Nishijima	2:33
(Japan)	Kazuyuki Fujita	KO
(England)	James Thompson	8:25
(Russia)	Fedor Emelianenko	BYE

Pride: Critical Countdown Absolute
(United States)	Josh Barnett	SUB
(New Zealand)	Mark Hunt	2:02
(Brazil)	Fabrício Werdum	20:00
(Brazil)	Antônio Rodrigo Nogueira	UD
(Croatia)	Mirko Cro Cop	TKO
(Japan)	Hidehiko Yoshida	7:38
(Japan)	Kazuyuki Fujita	9:21
(Brazil)	Wanderlei Silva^{1}	TKO

Pride: Final Conflict Absolute
(United States)	Josh Barnett	SD
(Brazil)	Antônio Rodrigo Nogueira	15:00
(Croatia)	Mirko Cro Cop	KO
(Brazil)	Wanderlei Silva	5:26

Pride: Final Conflict Absolute
(United States)	Josh Barnett	7:32
(Croatia)	Mirko Cro Cop	SUB

^{1}Fedor Emelianenko suffered a hand injury and could not participate in the tournament. He was replaced by Wanderlei Silva.

== Pride FC: Bushido 13 ==
Pride: Bushido 13
- Promotion: Pride Fighting Championships
- Date: November 5, 2006
- Venue: Yokohama Arena
- City: Yokohama

Event chronology
Pride 32	Pride: Bushido 13	Pride: Shockwave 2006

Pride FC: Bushido 13 was an event held on November 5, 2006, at Yokohama Arena in Yokohama, Japan.

This event consisted of the semifinal and final rounds of the Bushido Welterweight Grand Prix.

In a lightweight championship bout, Takanori Gomi faced Marcus Aurélio, who had defeated Gomi in a non-title fight at Pride Bushido 10.

Originally Gilbert Melendez was set to face Shinya Aoki but an injury during training forced Melendez to withdraw from the fight. Clay French replaced Melendez in the fight.

=== Results ===
Welterweight Grand Prix Finals
Weight class				Method	Round	Time	Notes
Welterweight	Kazuo Misaki	def.	Denis Kang	Decision (Split)	2	5:00
Welterweight Grand Prix Semifinals
Welterweight	Paulo Filho	def.	Kazuo Misaki	Submission (Armbar)	1	9:43	(Note: Paulo Filho dropped from the Grand Prix due to injuries sustained during his bout with Kazuo Misaki, who replaced him in the final round against Denis Kang.)
Welterweight	Denis Kang	def.	Akihiro Gono	Decision (Unanimous)	2	5:00
Welterweight Grand Prix Alternate bout
Welterweight	Gegard Mousasi	def.	Hector Lombard	Decision (Unanimous)	2	5:00
Non Tournament Bouts
Lightweight	Takanori Gomi (c)	def.	Marcus Aurelio	Decision (Split)	2	5:00	(Note: For the Pride Fighting Championship World Lightweight Championship.)
Lightweight	Shinya Aoki	def.	Clay French	Submission (Flying Triangle Choke)	1	3:57
Lightweight	Mitsuhiro Ishida	def.	David Bielkheden	Decision (Unanimous)	2	5:00
Heavyweight	Ikuhisa Minowa	def.	Mike Plotcheck	Decision (Unanimous)	2	5:00
Middleweight	Sanae Kikuta	def.	Jean-Francois Lenogue	Decision (Unanimous)	2	5:00
Bantamweight	Joe Pearson	def.	Yoshiro Maeda	Submission (Guillotine Choke)	1	0:54
Lightweight	Luiz Firmino	def.	Nobuhiro Obiya	Decision (Unanimous)	2	5:00
Middleweight	Murilo Bustamante	def.	Dong Sik Yoon	Decision (Unanimous)	2	5:00

=== 2006 Welterweight Grand Prix bracket ===
Pride: Bushido 11
(Japan)	Kazuo Misaki	UD
(United States)	Phil Baroni	15:00
(United States)	Dan Henderson	BYE
(Japan)	Ryo Chonan	DD
(United States)	Joey Villasenor	15:00
(Brazil)	Paulo Filho	UD
(France)	Gregory Bouchelaghem	15:00
(Japan)	Akihiro Gono	UD
(Cuba)	Hector Lombard	15:00
(Netherlands)	Gegard Mousasi	TKO
(Japan)	Makoto Takimoto	5:34
(Armenia)	Amar Suloev	UD
(Brazil)	Murilo Bustamante	15:00
(Canada)	Denis Kang	KO
(Brazil)	Murilo Rua	0:15

Pride: Bushido 12
(Japan)	Kazuo Misaki	UD
(United States)	Dan Henderson	15:00
(Japan)	Ryo Chonan	2:30
(Brazil)	Paulo Filho	SUB
(Japan)	Akihiro Gono	SUB
(Netherlands)	Gegard Mousasi	4:24
(Armenia)	Amar Suloev	4:10
(Canada)	Denis Kang	SUB

Pride: Bushido 13
(Japan)	Kazuo Misaki	9:43
(Brazil)	Paulo Filho	SUB
(Japan)	Akihiro Gono	15:00
(Canada)	Denis Kang	UD

Pride: Bushido 13
(Japan)	Kazuo Misaki ^{1}	DD
(Canada)	Denis Kang	15:00

^{1} Paulo Filho dropped from the Grand Prix due to injuries sustained during his bout with Kazuo Misaki, who replaced him in the final round against Denis Kang.

== See also ==
- Pride Fighting Championships
- List of Pride Fighting Championships champions
- List of Pride Fighting events
