= World Victory Road Presents: Sengoku 6 =

Mixed martial arts event

- The poster for World Victory Road Presents: Sengoku 6
- Promotion: World Victory Road
- Date: November 1, 2008
- Venue: Saitama Super Arena
- City: Saitama City, Japan
- Attendance: 12,456

Event chronology
World Victory Road Presents: Sengoku 5	World Victory Road Presents: Sengoku 6	World Victory Road Presents: Sengoku Rebellion 2009

World Victory Road Presents: Sengoku 6 was a mixed martial arts event promoted by World Victory Road. The event took place on November 1, 2008, at the Saitama Super Arena in Saitama City, Japan. It featured the semi-final and final matches of the organization's Lightweight- and Middleweight Grand Prix tournaments, allowing each tournament winner the opportunity to fight for the promotions championship.

== Results ==
Lightweight Grand Prix Final
Weight class				Method	Round	Time	Notes
Lightweight	Satoru Kitaoka	def.	Kazunori Yokota	Decision (Unanimous)	3	5:00
Middleweight Grand Prix Final
Middleweight	Jorge Santiago	def.	Kazuhiro Nakamura	TKO (Punches)	3	0:49
Main Card
Lightweight	Sergey Golyaev	def.	Takanori Gomi	Decision (Split)	3	5:00
Heavyweight	Muhammed Lawal	def.	Fabio Silva	TKO (Punches)	3	0:41
Light heavyweight	Antônio Rogério Nogueira	def.	Moise Rimbon	Decision (Unanimous)	3	5:00
Lightweight Grand Prix Reserve
Lightweight	Jorge Masvidal	def.	Tae Hyun Bang	Decision (Unanimous)	3	5:00
Middleweight Grand Prix Reserve
Middleweight	Joe Doerksen	def.	Izuru Takeuchi	TKO (Punches)	3	4:13
Lightweight Grand Prix Semi-Finals
Lightweight	Satoru Kitaoka	def.	Eiji Mitsuoka	Submission (Heel Hook)	1	1:16
Lightweight	Kazunori Yokota	def.	Mizuto Hirota	Decision (Unanimous)	3	5:00
Middleweight Grand Prix Semi-Finals
Middleweight	Kazuhiro Nakamura	def.	Yuki Sasaki	Decision (Unanimous)	3	5:00
Middleweight	Jorge Santiago	def.	Siyar Bahadurzada	Submission (Heel Hook)	1	1:10

== Tournament brackets ==
=== Lightweight Grand Prix Tournament ===
Sengoku 4
(United States)	Clay French
(Japan)	Satoru Kitaoka	W Sub
(Brazil)	Rodrigo Damm
(Japan)	Eiji Mitsuoka	W Sub
(Slovenia)	Bojan Kosednar
(Japan)	Kazunori Yokota	W Dec
(Japan)	Mizuto Hirota	W KO
(United States)	Ryan Schultz

Semifinals
(Japan)	Satoru Kitaoka	W Sub
(Japan)	Eiji Mitsuoka
(Japan)	Kazunori Yokota	W Dec
(Japan)	Mizuto Hirota

Final
(Japan)	Satoru Kitaoka	W Dec
(Japan)	Kazunori Yokota

Lightweight Grand Prix Reserve Bouts:

(United States) Jorge Masvidal def. (United States) Ryan Schultz at Sengoku 5
(United States) Jorge Masvidal def. (South Korea) Seung Hwan Bang at Sengoku 6

=== Middleweight Grand Prix Tournament ===
Sengoku 5
(Brazil)	Jorge Santiago	W Sub
(United States)	Logan Clark
(Brazil)	Evangelista Santos
(Afghanistan)	Siyar Bahadurzada	W TKO
(Japan)	Yuki Kondo
(Japan)	Yuki Sasaki	W Sub
(England)	Paul Cahoon
(Japan)	Kazuhiro Nakamura	W Dec

Semifinals
(Brazil)	Jorge Santiago	W Sub
(Afghanistan)	Siyar Bahadurzada
(Japan)	Yuki Sasaki
(Japan)	Kazuhiro Nakamura	W Dec

Final
(Brazil)	Jorge Santiago	W TKO
(Japan)	Kazuhiro Nakamura

Middleweight Grand Prix Reserve Bouts:

(Canada) Joe Doerksen def. (Japan) Izuru Takeuchi at Sengoku 6

== See also ==
- World Victory Road
- List of Sengoku champions
- 2008 in World Victory Road
