= Kazuhiro Nakamura =

Japanese mixed martial artist

Kazuhiro Nakamura 中村和裕
- Born: July 16, 1979 (age 47); Fukuyama, Hiroshima, Japan
- Other names: King Kaz, Kaz
- Height: 5 ft 11 in (1.80 m)
- Weight: 185 lb (84 kg; 13 st 3 lb)
- Division: Middleweight; Light heavyweight Heavyweight
- Reach: 70 in (180 cm)
- Stance: Orthodox
- Team: Yoshida Dojo; Team Kaz
- Trainer: Hidehiko Yoshida; Tsuyoshi Kohsaka
- Rank: 3rd dan black belt in Judo
- Years active: 2003–2014

Mixed martial arts record
- Total: 34
- Wins: 21
- By knockout: 5
- By submission: 3
- By decision: 13
- Losses: 13
- By knockout: 4
- By submission: 3
- By decision: 6

Other information
- Mixed martial arts record from Sherdog

Kazuhiro Nakamura (Japanese: 中村和裕 , born July 16, 1979) is a Japanese retired mixed martial artist who competed as a middleweight in DREAM, and is a former DEEP middleweight champion. He fought out of the Yoshida Dojo and also competed in the Pride Fighting Championships, the Ultimate Fighting Championship and the Sengoku Raiden Championship. His primary style was judo, in which he holds a third dan black belt under Hidehiko Yoshida.

== Career ==
Starting judo at 10 years old, Nakamura went to train under Katsuhiko Kashiwazaki and enter the Fukuyama University team. He became a professional judoka under the sponsorship of Keiyo Gas and competed at national and international level, placing third at the Japanese championships at 100+. His career in judo lasted until 2002, when he met Hidehiko Yoshida and became a member of his Yoshida Dojo.

=== PRIDE Fighting Championships ===
Nakamura made his MMA debut at PRIDE 25 against Antônio Rogério Nogueira, losing by submission in the second round. He has also lost to Nogueira in a rematch at PRIDE Bushido 4. His career in PRIDE was notable for fighting many of PRIDE's top fighters, including Wanderlei Silva, Maurício Rua, Dan Henderson, and Josh Barnett. His final fight in PRIDE was a decision loss to Maurício Rua at PRIDE Shockwave 2006. He was known for his flashy entrances, often coming to the ring wearing sunglasses and accompanied by penguin mascots.

=== Ultimate Fighting Championship ===
Nakamura made his debut in the UFC at UFC 76 against Lyoto Machida. His first appearance in the promotion was specially notable for his entrance and attire choices, coming to the cage wearing an ornated kimono, a jingasa hat and a gas mask before taking them off to reveal floral print shorts. He also carried a wagasa umbrella and exhibited a haircut adopted from Japanese comedian Toru Hotohara. During the fight, Nakamura absorbed punishment and avoided several possible finishes, but he lost by unanimous decision. After the contest, Nakamura would be suspended and fined $500 by the CSAC for failing a drug test for marijuana. Kazuhiro would protest the results, but it was not revoked.

His next fight in the UFC was a loss by TKO (injury) to Rameau Thierry Sokoudjou at UFC 84. He was subsequently released by the promotion.

=== Sengoku Raiden Championship ===
After a three-fight losing stint which included losses to future UFC Light Heavyweight Champions Lyoto Machida and Maurício Rua, Nakamura decided to debut at a new weight class Middleweight (185 lbs) after having spent his entire career at Light Heavyweight.

Nakamura debuted at Sengoku: Fifth Battle as an entrant in the inaugural Middleweight Grand prix eliminating British Paul Cahoon. He returned at Sengoku - Sixth battle as part of the final four. Kazuhiro Nakamura defeated fellow countryman Yuki Sasaki via unanimous decision and booked a spot later that evening in the final. Nakamura fought against tournament favourite Jorge Santiago and took him to the third round before losing via KO at 0:49 of the third round.

Nakamura Returned at Sengoku: Ninth Battle in a title eliminator that saw the winner rematch champion Jorge Santiago. Nakamura was stunned by Kazuo Misaki and lost via submission in the first round.

=== DREAM ===
A farewell event for Nakamura's teacher, Hidehiko Yoshida, was held on April 25, 2010. Nakamura defeated Yoshida via unanimous decision.

Nakamura made his return at Dream 17 to face UFC vet Gerald Harris. He lost the fight via split decision.

=== DEEP ===
On October 19, 2012, Nakamura made his debut in DEEP, where he defeated Ryuta Sakurai by majority decision. On February 16, 2013, Nakamura defeated Young Choi to win the vacant DEEP Middleweight Championship which is the first title of his career.

Nakamura faced Daijiro Matsui on June 30, 2013, at DEEP: King Kaz Fight in Fukuyama. Nakamura won via KO in the first round.

On August 25, 2013, Nakamura faced Henry Miller at DEEP: 63 Impact. Nakamura won the bout via first-round knockout.

Nakamura then faced Yuji Sakuragi at DEEP: Cage Impact 2013 on November 24, 2013. Nakamura won by arm triangle choke submission in the third round.

Nakamura was defeated by Ken Hasegawa via majority decision on March 22, 2014, at DEEP: 65 Impact.

On July 21, 2014, Nakamura faced Seigo Mizuguchi at DEEP: Cage Impact 2014 and won via second round corner stoppage.

Nakamura faced Yoshiyuki Nakanishi on December 21, 2014, in DEEP. He lost the fight by unanimous decision and retired from MMA competition after the fight.

=== Professional wrestling ===
On February 22, 2014, Nakamura made a one-off professional wrestling appearance for the Wrestle-1 promotion, teaming with Masakatsu Funaki, Manabu Soya and Seiya Sanada in an eight-man tag team match, where they defeated Desperado (Masayuki Kono, Kazma Sakamoto, René Duprée and Ryouji Sai).

== Championships and accomplishments ==
- DEEP
  - DEEP Middleweight Championship (1 time)
- Sengoku
  - 2008 Sengoku Middleweight Gran Prix Runner Up
- PRIDE FC
  - 2005 PRIDE Middleweight Grand Prix Quarterfinalist

== Mixed martial arts record ==
Professional record breakdown
34 matches	21 wins	13 losses
By knockout	5	4
By submission	3	3
By decision	13	6

Res.	Record	Opponent	Method	Event	Date	Round	Time	Location	Notes
Loss	21–13	Yoshiyuki Nakanishi	Decision (unanimous)	Deep: 70 Impact	December 21, 2014	3	5:00	Tokyo, Japan	Loss DEEP Middleweight Championship.
Win	21–12	Seigo Mizuguchi	TKO (corner stoppage)	Deep: Cage Impact 2014	July 21, 2014	2	3:25	Tokyo, Japan	
Loss	20–12	Ken Hasegawa	Decision (majority)	Deep: 65 Impact	March 22, 2014	3	5:00	Tokyo, Japan	For the DEEP Megaton Championship.
Win	20–11	Yuji Sakuragi	Submission (arm-triangle choke)	Deep: Cage Impact 2013	November 24, 2013	3	2:49	Tokyo, Japan	
Win	19–11	Henry Miller	KO (punch)	Deep: 63 Impact	August 25, 2013	1	4:42	Tokyo, Japan	
Win	18–11	Daijiro Matsui	KO (knee and punches)	Deep: King Kaz Fight in Fukuyama	June 30, 2013	1	1:30	Hiroshima, Japan	
Win	17–11	Young Choi	Decision (unanimous)	Deep: 61 Impact	February 16, 2013	3	5:00	Tokyo, Japan	Won vacant DEEP Middleweight Championship.
Win	16–11	Ryuta Sakurai	Decision (majority)	Deep: 60 Impact	October 19, 2012	3	5:00	Tokyo, Japan	
Loss	15–11	Gerald Harris	Decision (split)	Dream 17	September 24, 2011	3	5:00	Saitama, Japan	
Win	15–10	Karl Amoussou	Decision (unanimous)	Dream 15	July 10, 2010	2	5:00	Saitama, Saitama, Japan	
Win	14–10	Hidehiko Yoshida	Decision (unanimous)	Astra: Yoshida's Farewell	April 25, 2010	3	5:00	Tokyo, Japan	
Loss	13–10	Kazuo Misaki	Technical Submission (guillotine choke)	World Victory Road Presents: Sengoku 9	August 2, 2009	1	3:03	Saitama, Saitama, Japan	
Loss	13–9	Jorge Santiago	TKO (punches)	World Victory Road Presents: Sengoku 6	November 1, 2008	3	0:49	Saitama, Saitama, Japan	Sengoku Middleweight Grandprix 2008 Final Round.
Win	13–8	Yuki Sasaki	Decision (unanimous)	World Victory Road Presents: Sengoku 6	November 1, 2008	3	5:00	Saitama, Saitama, Japan	Sengoku Middleweight Grandprix 2008 Semifinal Round.
Win	12–8	Paul Cahoon	Decision (unanimous)	World Victory Road Presents: Sengoku 5	September 28, 2008	3	5:00	Tokyo, Japan	Sengoku Middleweight Grandprix 2008 Opening Round. Drops to Middleweight.
Loss	11–8	Rameau Thierry Sokoudjou	TKO (leg injury)	UFC 84	May 24, 2008	1	5:00	Las Vegas, Nevada, United States	Light heavyweight bout
Loss	11–7	Lyoto Machida	Decision (unanimous)	UFC 76	September 22, 2007	3	5:00	Anaheim, California, United States	Light heavyweight bout
Loss	11–6	Maurício Rua	Decision (unanimous)	Pride FC - Shockwave 2006	December 31, 2006	3	5:00	Saitama, Saitama, Japan	Light heavyweight bout
Win	11–5	Travis Galbraith	TKO (knee and punches)	Pride 32 - The Real Deal	October 21, 2006	2	1:16	Las Vegas, Nevada, United States	
Win	10–5	Yoshihiro Nakao	Decision (unanimous)	Pride FC - Final Conflict Absolute	September 10, 2006	3	5:00	Saitama, Saitama, Japan	
Win	9–5	Evangelista Santos	Submission (americana)	Pride FC - Critical Countdown Absolute	July 1, 2006	1	4:49	Saitama, Saitama, Japan	
Loss	8–5	Josh Barnett	Submission (rear-naked choke)	Pride 31 - Dreamers	February 26, 2006	1	8:10	Saitama, Saitama, Japan	Heavyweight bout.
Win	8–4	Yuki Kondo	Decision (unanimous)	PRIDE Shockwave 2005	December 31, 2005	3	5:00	Saitama, Saitama, Japan	
Win	7–4	Igor Vovchanchyn	Decision (unanimous)	PRIDE Final Conflict 2005	August 28, 2005	2	5:00	Saitama, Saitama, Japan	
Loss	6–4	Wanderlei Silva	TKO (punches)	PRIDE Critical Countdown 2005	June 26, 2005	1	5:24	Saitama, Saitama, Japan	PRIDE 2005 Middleweight Grand Prix Quarterfinal.
Win	6–3	Kevin Randleman	Decision (unanimous)	PRIDE Total Elimination 2005	April 23, 2005	3	5:00	Osaka, Japan	PRIDE 2005 Middleweight Grand Prix Opening Round.
Win	5–3	Stefan Leko	TKO (punches)	PRIDE 29	February 20, 2005	1	0:54	Saitama, Saitama, Japan	
Loss	4–3	Dan Henderson	TKO (shoulder injury)	PRIDE 28	October 31, 2004	1	1:15	Saitama, Saitama, Japan	
Win	4–2	Murilo Bustamante	Decision (unanimous)	PRIDE Final Conflict 2004	August 15, 2004	3	5:00	Saitama, Saitama, Japan	
Loss	3–2	Antônio Rogério Nogueira	Decision (split)	PRIDE Bushido 4	July 19, 2004	2	5:00	Nagoya, Japan	
Win	3–1	Chalid Arrab	Submission (armbar)	PRIDE Bushido 3	May 23, 2004	1	4:45	Yokohama, Japan	
Win	2–1	Dos Caras Jr.	Decision (unanimous)	PRIDE 27	February 1, 2004	3	5:00	Osaka, Japan	
Win	1–1	Daniel Gracie	Decision (unanimous)	PRIDE Bushido 1	October 5, 2003	2	5:00	Saitama, Saitama, Japan	
Loss	0–1	Antônio Rogério Nogueira	Submission (armbar)	PRIDE 25	March 16, 2003	2	3:49	Yokohama, Japan	
