= 2005 in Pride FC =

Mixed martial arts events

Information
- First date: February 20, 2005
- Last date: December 31, 2005

Events
- Total events: 10

Fights
- Total fights: 98
- Title fights: 4

Chronology
2004 in Pride	2005 in Pride FC	2006 in Pride

The year 2005 was the 9th year in the history of the Pride Fighting Championships, a mixed martial arts promotion based in Japan. 2005 had 10 events beginning with, Pride 29 - Fists of Fire.

== Title fights ==
Title fights in 2005
Weight class				Method	Round	Time	Event	Notes
Heavyweight	Fedor Emelianenko (c)	def.	Mirko Cro Cop	Decision (Unanimous)	3	5:00	Pride FC - Final Conflict 2005	(Note: For the Pride Fighting Championship World Heavyweight Championship.)
Middleweight	Wanderlei Silva (c)	def.	Ricardo Arona	Decision (Split)	3	5:00	Pride FC - Shockwave 2005	(Note: For the Pride Middleweight Championship.)
Lightweight	Takanori Gomi	def.	Hayato Sakurai	KO (Punches)	1	3:56	Pride FC - Shockwave 2005	(Note: For the Pride Fighting Championship World Lightweight Championship.)
Welterweight	Dan Henderson	def.	Murilo Bustamante	Decision (Split)	2	5:00	Pride FC - Shockwave 2005	(Note: For the Pride Fighting Championship World Welterweight Championship.)

== Debut Pride FC fighters ==
The following fighters fought their first Pride FC fight in 2005:

- Alexandru Lungu
- Aliev Makhmud
- Andrei Semenov
- Daisuke Sugie
- Daniel Acacio
- David Abbott
- Denis Kang
- Dong Sik Yoon
- Fabrício Werdum
- Ibragim Magomedov
- In Seok Kim
- Jean Silva
- Joachim Hansen
- Josh Thomson
- Jutaro Nakao
- Ken Kaneko
- Luiz Azeredo
- Masanori Suda
- Michihiro Omigawa
- Milton Vieira
- Murad Chunkaiev
- Naoyuki Kotani
- Pawel Nastula
- Pedro Rizzo
- Phil Baroni
- Roman Zentsov
- Ryuichi Murata
- Tatsuya Kawajiri
- Tomomi Iwama
- Tsuyoshi Kosaka
- Wagner da Conceicao Martins
- Yoshiro Maeda
- Yves Edwards
- Aaron Riley

== Events list ==
#	Event	Japanese name	Date held	Venue	City	Attendance
56	Pride FC - Shockwave 2005	Otokomatsuri - Itadaki	December 31, 2005	Saitama Super Arena	Saitama, Japan	49,801
55	Pride 30 - Fully Loaded	Starting Over	October 23, 2005	Saitama Super Arena	Saitama, Japan	—N/a
54	Pride - Bushido 9	The Tournament	September 25, 2005	Ariake Coliseum	Tokyo, Japan	10,775
53	Pride FC - Final Conflict 2005	Ketsushosen	August 28, 2005	Saitama Super Arena	Saitama, Japan	—N/a
52	Pride - Bushido 8	—N/a	July 17, 2005	Nagoya Rainbow Hall	Nagoya, Japan	—N/a
51	Pride FC - Critical Countdown 2005	2nd Round	June 26, 2005	Saitama Super Arena	Saitama, Japan	—N/a
50	Pride - Bushido 7	—N/a	May 22, 2005	Ariake Coliseum	Tokyo, Japan	—N/a
49	Pride FC - Total Elimination 2005	Kaimakusen	April 23, 2005	Osaka Dome	Osaka, Japan	45,423
48	Pride - Bushido 6	—N/a	April 3, 2005	Yokohama Arena	Yokohama, Japan	—N/a
47	Pride 29 - Fists of Fire	Survival	February 20, 2005	Saitama Super Arena	Saitama, Japan	22,047

== Pride 29: Fists of Fire ==
Pride 29
- Promotion: Pride Fighting Championships
- Date: February 20, 2005
- Venue: Saitama Super Arena
- City: Saitama
- Attendance: 22,047

Event chronology
Pride: Shockwave 2004	Pride 29	Pride: Bushido 6

Pride 29: Fists of Fire was an event held on February 20, 2005 at Osaka-jo Hall in Osaka, Japan.

=== Results ===
Fight Card
Weight Class				Method	Round	Time	Notes
Heavyweight 120 kg	(Croatia) Mirko Filipovic	def.	(United States) Mark Coleman	KO (punches)	1	3:40	
Middleweight 93 kg	(United States) Quinton Jackson	def.	(Brazil) Murilo Rua	Decision (split)	3	20:00	
Middleweight 93 kg	(Brazil) Antônio Rogério Nogueira	def.	(Netherlands) Alistair Overeem	Decision (unanimous)	3	20:00	
Welterweight 83 kg	(Japan) Kiyoshi Tamura	def.	(Azerbaijan) Aliev Makhmud	TKO (retirement)	1	7:09	
Heavyweight 120 kg	(Russia) Sergei Kharitonov	def.	(South Korea) Mu Bae Choi	KO (punches)	1	3:24	
Middleweight 93 kg	(Japan) Kazuhiro Nakamura	def.	(Germany) Stefan Leko	TKO (punches)	1	0:54	
Middleweight 93 kg	(Ukraine) Igor Vovchanchyn	def.	(Japan) Kazuo Takahashi	KO (punch)	1	1:10	
Middleweight 93 kg	(Brazil) Maurício Rua	def.	(Japan) Hiromitsu Kanehara	TKO (stomp)	1	1:40	
Heavyweight 120 kg	(Brazil) Fabrício Werdum	def.	(United States) Tom Erikson	Submission (RNC)	1	5:11	
Middleweight 93 kg	(Brazil) Mario Sperry	def.	(Japan) Hirotaka Yokoi	TKO (knees)	1	9:08	

== Pride FC: Bushido 6 ==
Pride: Bushido 6
- Promotion: Pride Fighting Championships
- Date: April 3, 2005
- Venue: Yokohama Arena
- City: Yokohama

Event chronology
Pride 29	Pride: Bushido 6	Pride: Total Elimination 2005

Pride FC: Bushido 6 was an event held on April 3, 2005 at Osaka-jo Hall in Osaka, Japan.

=== Results ===
Main Card
Weight class				Method	Round	Time	Notes
	Fedor Emelianenko	def.	Tsuyoshi Kosaka	TKO (Doctor Stoppage)	1	10:00
	Ikuhisa Minowa	def.	Gilbert Yvel	Submission (Toe Hold)	1	1:10
	Murilo Bustamante	def.	Ryuta Sakurai	Decision (Unanimous)	2	5:00
	Alexander Emelianenko	def.	Ricardo Morais	KO (Punches)	1	0:15
	Daniel Acacio	def.	Daiju Takase	TKO (Soccer Kicks)	2	3:34
	Luiz Azeredo	def.	Luiz Firmino	Decision (Split)	2	5:00
	Marcus Aurelio	def.	Daisuke Nakamura	Decision (Unanimous)	2	5:00
	Dean Lister	def.	Akira Shoji	Submission (Triangle Choke)	1	3:13
	Paulo Filho	def.	Amar Suloev	Submission (Armbar)	1	4:22
	Denis Kang	def.	Takahiro Oba	Submission (Armbar)	1	4:24

== Pride FC: Total Elimination 2005 ==
Pride: Total Elimination 2005
- Promotion: Pride Fighting Championships
- Date: April 23, 2005
- Venue: Osaka Dome
- City: Osaka
- Attendance: 45,423

Event chronology
Pride: Bushido 6	Pride: Total Elimination 2005	Pride: Bushido 7

Pride FC: Total Elimination 2005 was an event held on April 23, 2005 at Osaka-jo Hall in Osaka, Japan.

=== Results ===
Fight Card
Weight Class				Method	Round	Time	Notes
Middleweight 93 kg	(Brazil) Wanderlei Silva	def.	(Japan) Hidehiko Yoshida	Decision (Split)	3	5:00	
Middleweight 93 kg	(Brazil) Maurício Rua	def.	(United States) Quinton Jackson	TKO (Soccer Kicks)	1	4:47	
Middleweight 93 kg	(Japan) Kazushi Sakuraba	def.	(South Korea) Dong Sik Yoon	TKO (Punches)	1	0:38	
Middleweight 93 kg	(Brazil) Antônio Rogério Nogueira	def.	(United States) Dan Henderson	Submission (Armbar)	1	8:05	
Middleweight 93 kg	(Netherlands) Alistair Overeem	def.	(Brazil) Vitor Belfort	Submission (Guillotine Choke)	1	9:36	
Middleweight 93 kg	(Ukraine) Igor Vovchanchyn	def.	(Japan) Yuki Kondo	Decision (Unanimous)	3	5:00	
Middleweight 93 kg	(Brazil) Ricardo Arona	def.	(United States) Dean Lister	Decision (Unanimous)	3	5:00	
Middleweight 93 kg	(Japan) Kazuhiro Nakamura	def.	(United States) Kevin Randleman	Decision (Unanimous)	3	5:00	

=== Pride GP 2005 Middleweight Bracket ===
Total Elimination
(Japan)	Kazushi Sakuraba	KO
(South Korea)	Dong-Sik Yoon	0:38
(Brazil)	Ricardo Arona	UD
(United States)	Dean Lister	20:00
(Japan)	Kazuhiro Nakamura	UD
(United States)	Kevin Randleman	20:00
(Brazil)	Wanderlei Silva	DD
(Japan)	Hidehiko Yoshida	20:00
(Netherlands)	Alistair Overeem	SUB
(Brazil)	Vitor Belfort	9:36
(Ukraine)	Igor Vovchanchyn	UD
(Japan)	Yuki Kondo	20:00
(Brazil)	Antônio Rogério Nogueira	SUB
(United States)	Dan Henderson	8:05
(Brazil)	Maurício Rua	TKO
(United States)	Quinton Jackson	4:47

Critical Countdown
(Japan)	Kazushi Sakuraba
(Brazil)	Ricardo Arona
(Japan)	Kazuhiro Nakamura
(Brazil)	Wanderlei Silva
(Netherlands)	Alistair Overeem
(Ukraine)	Igor Vovchanchyn
(Brazil)	Antônio Rogério Nogueira
(Brazil)	Maurício Rua

Final Conflict

Final Conflict

== Pride FC: Bushido 7 ==
Pride: Bushido 7
- Promotion: Pride Fighting Championships
- Date: May 22, 2005
- Venue: Differ Ariake
- City: Tokyo

Event chronology
Pride: Total Elimination 2005	Pride: Bushido 7	Pride: Critical Countdown 2005

Pride FC: Bushido 7 was an event held on May 22, 2005 at Osaka-jo Hall in Osaka, Japan.

=== Results ===
Main Card
Weight class				Method	Round	Time	Notes
	(Japan) Takanori Gomi	def.	(Brazil) Luiz Azeredo	KO (Punches)	1	3:46
	(United States) Phil Baroni	def.	(Japan) Ikuhisa Minowa	TKO (Stomps)	2	2:04
	(Japan) Ryo Chonan	def.	(Brazil) Antônio Schembri	Decision (Unanimous)	2	5:00
	(Japan) Tatsuya Kawajiri	def.	(South Korea) In Seok Kim	TKO (Corner Stoppage)	1	3:28
	(Japan) Akihiro Gono	def.	(Brazil) Crosley Gracie	Decision (Unanimous)	2	5:00
	(Japan) Hayato Sakurai	def.	(Brazil) Milton Vieira	Decision (Unanimous)	2	5:00
	(United States) Aaron Riley	def.	(Japan) Michihiro Omigawa	KO (Head Kick)	1	6:00
	(The Bahamas) Yves Edwards	def.	(Japan) Dokonjonosuke Mishima	Submission (Armbar)	1	4:36
	(United States) Jens Pulver	def.	(Japan) Tomomi Iwama	KO (Punch)	1	1:00
	(United States) Charles Bennett	def.	(Japan) Yoshiro Maeda	KO (Punch)	1	1:55

== Pride FC: Critical Countdown 2005 ==
Pride: Critical Countdown 2005
- Promotion: Pride Fighting Championships
- Date: June 26, 2005
- Venue: Saitama Super Arena
- City: Saitama

Event chronology
Pride: Bushido 7	Pride: Critical Countdown 2005	Pride: Bushido 8

Pride FC: Critical Countdown 2005 was an event held on June 26, 2005 at Osaka-jo Hall in Osaka, Japan.

=== Results ===
Main Card
Weight class				Method	Round	Time	Notes
	(Brazil) Wanderlei Silva	def.	(Japan) Kazuhiro Nakamura	TKO (Punches)	1	5:24
	(Brazil) Ricardo Arona	def.	(Japan) Kazushi Sakuraba	TKO (Corner Stoppage)	2	5:00
	(Brazil) Antônio Rodrigo Nogueira	def.	(Poland) Pawel Nastula	TKO (Punches)	1	8:38
	(Japan) Kiyoshi Tamura	def.	(Japan) Makoto Takimoto	Decision (Unanimous)	3	5:00
	(Croatia) Mirko Cro Cop	def.	(Russia) Ibragim Magomedov	KO (Kick to the Body)	1	3:53
	(Netherlands) Alistair Overeem	def.	(Ukraine) Igor Vovchanchyn	Submission (Guillotine Choke)	1	1:20
	(Brazil) Maurício Rua	def.	(Brazil) Antônio Rogério Nogueira	Decision (Unanimous)	3	5:00
	(Russia) Sergei Kharitonov	def.	(Brazil) Pedro Rizzo	TKO (Soccer Kick and Punches)	1	2:02

=== Pride GP 2005 Middleweight Bracket ===
Total Elimination
(Japan)	Kazushi Sakuraba	KO
(South Korea)	Dong-Sik Yoon	0:38
(Brazil)	Ricardo Arona	UD
(United States)	Dean Lister	20:00
(Japan)	Kazuhiro Nakamura	UD
(United States)	Kevin Randleman	20:00
(Brazil)	Wanderlei Silva	DD
(Japan)	Hidehiko Yoshida	20:00
(Netherlands)	Alistair Overeem	SUB
(Brazil)	Vitor Belfort	9:36
(Ukraine)	Igor Vovchanchyn	UD
(Japan)	Yuki Kondo	20:00
(Brazil)	Antônio Rogério Nogueira	SUB
(United States)	Dan Henderson	8:05
(Brazil)	Maurício Rua	TKO
(United States)	Quinton Jackson	4:47

Critical Countdown
(Japan)	Kazushi Sakuraba	15:00
(Brazil)	Ricardo Arona	TKO
(Japan)	Kazuhiro Nakamura	5:24
(Brazil)	Wanderlei Silva	TKO
(Netherlands)	Alistair Overeem	SUB
(Ukraine)	Igor Vovchanchyn	1:20
(Brazil)	Antônio Rogério Nogueira	20:00
(Brazil)	Maurício Rua	UD

Final Conflict
(Brazil)	Ricardo Arona
(Brazil)	Wanderlei Silva
(Netherlands)	Alistair Overeem
(Brazil)	Maurício Rua

Final Conflict

== Pride FC: Bushido 8 ==
Pride: Bushido 8
- Promotion: Pride Fighting Championships
- Date: July 17, 2005
- Venue: Nagoya Rainbow Hall
- City: Nagoya

Event chronology
Pride: Critical Countdown 2005	Pride: Bushido 8	Pride: Final Conflict 2005

Pride FC: Bushido 8 was an event held on July 17, 2005 at Nagoya Rainbow Hall in Nagoya, Japan.

=== Results ===
Main Card
Weight class				Method	Round	Time	Notes
	Takanori Gomi	def.	Jean Silva	Decision (Unanimous)	2	5:00
	Phil Baroni	def.	Ryo Chonan	KO (Punch)	1	1:40
	Ikuhisa Minowa	def.	Kimo Leopoldo	Submission (Achilles Lock)	1	3:11
	Tatsuya Kawajiri	def.	Luiz Firmino	Decision (Unanimous)	2	5:00
	Daniel Acacio	def.	Kazuo Misaki	Decision (Unanimous)	2	5:00
	Joachim Hansen	def.	Masakazu Imanari	KO (Knee)	1	2:34
	James Thompson	def.	Henry Miller	KO (Punch)	1	1:21
	Kazuki Okubo	def.	Ryuichi Murata	Submission (Armbar)	1	9:30
	Marcus Aurelio	def.	Jutaro Nakao	Decision (Unanimous)	2	5:00
	Denis Kang	def.	Andrei Semenov	Decision (Unanimous)	2	5:00
	Josh Thomson	def.	Daisuke Sugie	Submission (Kneebar)	1	4:35

== Pride FC: Final Conflict 2005 ==
Pride: Final Conflict 2005
- Promotion: Pride Fighting Championships
- Date: August 28, 2005
- Venue: Saitama Super Arena
- City: Saitama
- Attendance: 47,629

Event chronology
Pride: Bushido 8	Pride: Final Conflict 2005	Pride: Bushido 9

Pride FC: Final Conflict 2005 was an event held on August 28, 2005 at Osaka-jo Hall in Osaka, Japan.

=== Results ===
Main Card
Weight class				Method	Round	Time	Notes
	Maurício Rua	def.	Ricardo Arona	KO (Punches)	1	2:54
Heavyweight	Fedor Emelianenko (c)	def.	Mirko Cro Cop	Decision (Unanimous)	3	5:00	(Note: For the Pride Fighting Championship World Heavyweight Championship.)
	Hidehiko Yoshida	def.	David Abbott	Submission (Single Wing Choke)	1	7:40
	Fabrício Werdum	def.	Roman Zentsov	Submission (Triangle Armbar)	1	6:01
	Maurício Rua	def.	Alistair Overeem	TKO (Punches)	1	6:42
	Ricardo Arona	def.	Wanderlei Silva	Decision (Unanimous)	2	5:00
	Kazuhiro Nakamura	def.	Igor Vovchanchyn	Decision (Unanimous)	2	5:00

=== Pride GP 2005 Middleweight Bracket ===
Total Elimination
(Japan)	Kazushi Sakuraba	KO
(South Korea)	Dong-Sik Yoon	0:38
(Brazil)	Ricardo Arona	UD
(United States)	Dean Lister	20:00
(Japan)	Kazuhiro Nakamura	UD
(United States)	Kevin Randleman	20:00
(Brazil)	Wanderlei Silva	DD
(Japan)	Hidehiko Yoshida	20:00
(Netherlands)	Alistair Overeem	SUB
(Brazil)	Vitor Belfort	9:36
(Ukraine)	Igor Vovchanchyn	UD
(Japan)	Yuki Kondo	20:00
(Brazil)	Antônio Rogério Nogueira	SUB
(United States)	Dan Henderson	8:05
(Brazil)	Maurício Rua	TKO
(United States)	Quinton Jackson	4:47

Critical Countdown
(Japan)	Kazushi Sakuraba	15:00
(Brazil)	Ricardo Arona	TKO
(Japan)	Kazuhiro Nakamura	5:24
(Brazil)	Wanderlei Silva	TKO
(Netherlands)	Alistair Overeem	SUB
(Ukraine)	Igor Vovchanchyn	1:20
(Brazil)	Antônio Rogério Nogueira	20:00
(Brazil)	Maurício Rua	UD

Final Conflict
(Brazil)	Ricardo Arona	UD
(Brazil)	Wanderlei Silva	15:00
(Netherlands)	Alistair Overeem	6:42
(Brazil)	Maurício Rua	TKO

Final Conflict
(Brazil)	Ricardo Arona	2:54
(Brazil)	Maurício Rua	KO

== Pride FC: Bushido 9 ==
Pride: Bushido 9
- Promotion: Pride Fighting Championships
- Date: September 25, 2005
- Venue: Ariake Coliseum
- City: Tokyo
- Attendance: 10,775

Event chronology
Pride: Final Conflict 2005	Pride: Bushido 9	Pride 30

Pride FC: Bushido 9 was an event held on September 25, 2005 at Ariake Coliseum in Tokyo, Japan.

=== Results ===
Main Card
Weight class				Method	Round	Time	Notes
	Takanori Gomi	def.	Luiz Azeredo	Decision (Unanimous)	2	5:00
	Hayato Sakurai	def.	Joachim Hansen	Decision (Unanimous)	2	5:00
	Murilo Bustamante	def.	Ikuhisa Minowa	TKO (Punches)	1	9:51
	Dan Henderson	def.	Akihiro Gono	KO (Punch)	1	7:58
	Luiz Azeredo	def.	Naoyuki Kotani	KO (Punch)	1	0:11
	Takanori Gomi	def.	Tatsuya Kawajiri	Submission (Rear-Naked Choke)	1	7:42
	Joachim Hansen	def.	Yves Edwards	Decision (Split)	2	5:00
	Hayato Sakurai	def.	Jens Pulver	TKO (Punches)	1	8:56
	Dokonjonosuke Mishima	def.	Charles Bennett	Submission (Ankle Lock)	1	4:04
	Murilo Bustamante	def.	Masanori Suda	Submission (Armbar)	1	3:20
	Ikuhisa Minowa	def.	Phil Baroni	Decision (Unanimous)	2	5:00
	Dan Henderson	def.	Ryo Chonan	KO (Punch)	1	0:22
	Akihiro Gono	def.	Daniel Acacio	Decision (Unanimous)	2	5:00
	Paulo Filho	def.	Ryuta Sakurai	Submission (Armbar)	1	3:49

=== Welterweight Tournament Bracket ===
Quarterfinals
(Japan)	Akihiro Gono	UD
(Brazil)	Daniel Acacio	15:00
(United States)	Dan Henderson	KO
(Japan)	Ryo Chonan	0:22
(Japan)	Ikuhisa Minowa	UD
(United States)	Phil Baroni	15:00
(Brazil)	Murilo Bustamante	SUB
(Japan)	Masanori Suda	3:20

Semifinals
(Japan)	Akihiro Gono	7:58
(United States)	Dan Henderson	KO
(Japan)	Ikuhisa Minowa	9:51
(Brazil)	Murilo Bustamante	TKO

Finals
(United States)	Dan Henderson
(Brazil)	Murilo Bustamante

=== Lightweight Tournament Bracket ===
Quarterfinals
(Japan)	Hayato Sakurai	TKO
(United States)	Jens Pulver	8:56
(Norway)	Joachim Hansen	DD
(The Bahamas)	Yves Edwards	15:00
(Japan)	Takanori Gomi	SUB
(Japan)	Tatsuya Kawajiri	7:42
(Brazil)	Luiz Azeredo	KO
(Japan)	Naoyuki Kotani	0:11

Semifinals
(Japan)	Hayato Sakurai	UD
(Norway)	Joachim Hansen	15:00
(Japan)	Takanori Gomi	UD
(Brazil)	Luiz Azeredo	15:00

Finals
(Japan)	Hayato Sakurai
(Japan)	Takanori Gomi

== Pride 30: Fully Loaded ==
Pride 30
- Promotion: Pride Fighting Championships
- Date: October 23, 2005
- Venue: Saitama Super Arena
- City: Saitama

Event chronology
Pride: Bushido 9	Pride 30	Pride: Shockwave 2005

Pride 30: Fully Loaded was an event held on October 23, 2005 at Saitama Super Arena in Saitama, Japan.

=== Results ===
Main Card
Weight class				Method	Round	Time	Notes
	(Croatia) Mirko Cro Cop	def.	(United States) Josh Barnett	Decision (Unanimous)	3	5:00
	(Japan) Kazushi Sakuraba	def.	(United States) Ken Shamrock	TKO (Punch)	1	2:27
	(Japan) Makoto Takimoto	def.	(South Korea) Dong Sik Yoon	Decision (Unanimous)	3	5:00
	(Russia) Sergei Kharitonov	def.	(Brazil) Fabrício Werdum	Decision (Split)	3	5:00
	(United States) Quinton Jackson	def.	(Japan) Hirotaka Yokoi	TKO (Punches and Stomps)	1	4:05
	(England) James Thompson	def.	(Romania) Alexandru Lungu	TKO (Punches)	1	2:13
	(Brazil) Murilo Rua	def.	(Russia) Murad Chunkaiev	Submission (Heel Hook)	1	3:31
	(Brazil) Wagner da Conceicao Martins	def.	(United States) Henry Miller	TKO (Knees)	1	1:31

== Pride FC: Shockwave 2005 ==
Pride: Shockwave 2005
- Promotion: Pride Fighting Championships
- Date: December 31, 2005
- Venue: Saitama Super Arena
- City: Saitama
- Attendance: 49,801

Event chronology
Pride 30	Pride: Shockwave 2005	Pride 31

Pride FC: Shockwave 2005 was an event held on December 31, 2005 at Saitama Super Arena in Saitama, Japan. The event included the finals of the Pride Welterweight and Lightwent tournaments that began at Pride: Bushido 9, a rematch between Wanderlei Silva and Ricardo Arona for the Pride Middleweight Championship, and a main event between Olympic judokas Naoya Ogawa and Hidehiko Yoshida.

=== Results ===
Main Card
Weight class				Method	Round	Time	Notes
	(Japan) Hidehiko Yoshida	def.	(Japan) Naoya Ogawa	Submission (Armbar)	1	6:04
Middleweight	(Brazil) Wanderlei Silva (c)	def.	(Brazil) Ricardo Arona	Decision (Split)	3	5:00	(Note: For the Pride Middleweight Championship.)
	(New Zealand) Mark Hunt	def.	(Croatia) Mirko Cro Cop	Decision (Split)	3	5:00
	(Japan) Kazushi Sakuraba	def.	(Japan) Ikuhisa Minowa	Technical Submission (Kimura)	1	9:59
Lightweight	(Japan) Takanori Gomi	def.	(Japan) Hayato Sakurai	KO (Punches)	1	3:56	(Note: For the Pride Fighting Championship World Lightweight Championship.)
Welterweight	(United States) Dan Henderson	def.	(Brazil) Murilo Bustamante	Decision (Split)	2	5:00	(Note: For the Pride Fighting Championship World Welterweight Championship.)
	(Russia) Fedor Emelianenko	def.	(Brazil) Wagner da Conceicao Martins	TKO (Submission to Punches)	1	0:26
	(Russia) Alexander Emelianenko	def.	(Poland) Pawel Nastula	Submission (Rear-Naked Choke)	1	8:45
	(Japan) Sanae Kikuta	def.	(Japan) Makoto Takimoto	Decision (Unanimous)	3	5:00
	(United Kingdom) James Thompson	def.	(Brazil) Paulo Cesar Silva	TKO (Punches)	1	1:28
	(Japan) Kazuhiro Nakamura	def.	(Japan) Yuki Kondo	Decision (Unanimous)	3	5:00
	(United States) Charles Bennett	def.	(Japan) Ken Kaneko	Submission (Armbar)	1	4:14

=== Welterweight Tournament Bracket ===
Quarterfinals
(Japan)	Akihiro Gono	UD
(Brazil)	Daniel Acacio	20:00
(United States)	Dan Henderson	KO
(Japan)	Ryo Chonan	0:22
(Japan)	Ikuhisa Minowa	UD
(United States)	Phil Baroni	20:00
(Brazil)	Murilo Bustamante	SUB
(Japan)	Masanori Suda	3:20

Semifinals
(Japan)	Akihiro Gono	7:58
(United States)	Dan Henderson	KO
(Japan)	Ikuhisa Minowa	9:51
(Brazil)	Murilo Bustamante	TKO

Finals
(United States)	Dan Henderson	DD
(Brazil)	Murilo Bustamante	15:00

=== Lightweight Tournament Bracket ===
Quarterfinals
(Japan)	Hayato Sakurai	TKO
(United States)	Jens Pulver	8:56
(Norway)	Joachim Hansen	DD
(The Bahamas)	Yves Edwards	20:00
(Japan)	Takanori Gomi	SUB
(Japan)	Tatsuya Kawajiri	7:42
(Brazil)	Luiz Azeredo	KO
(Japan)	Naoyuki Kotani	0:11

Semifinals
(Japan)	Hayato Sakurai	UD
(Norway)	Joachim Hansen	20:00
(Japan)	Takanori Gomi	UD
(Brazil)	Luiz Azeredo	20:00

Finals
(Japan)	Hayato Sakurai	3:56
(Japan)	Takanori Gomi	KO

== See also ==
- Pride Fighting Championships
- List of Pride Fighting Championships champions
- List of Pride Fighting events
