= Evangelista Santos =

Brazilian mixed martial arts fighter (1977)

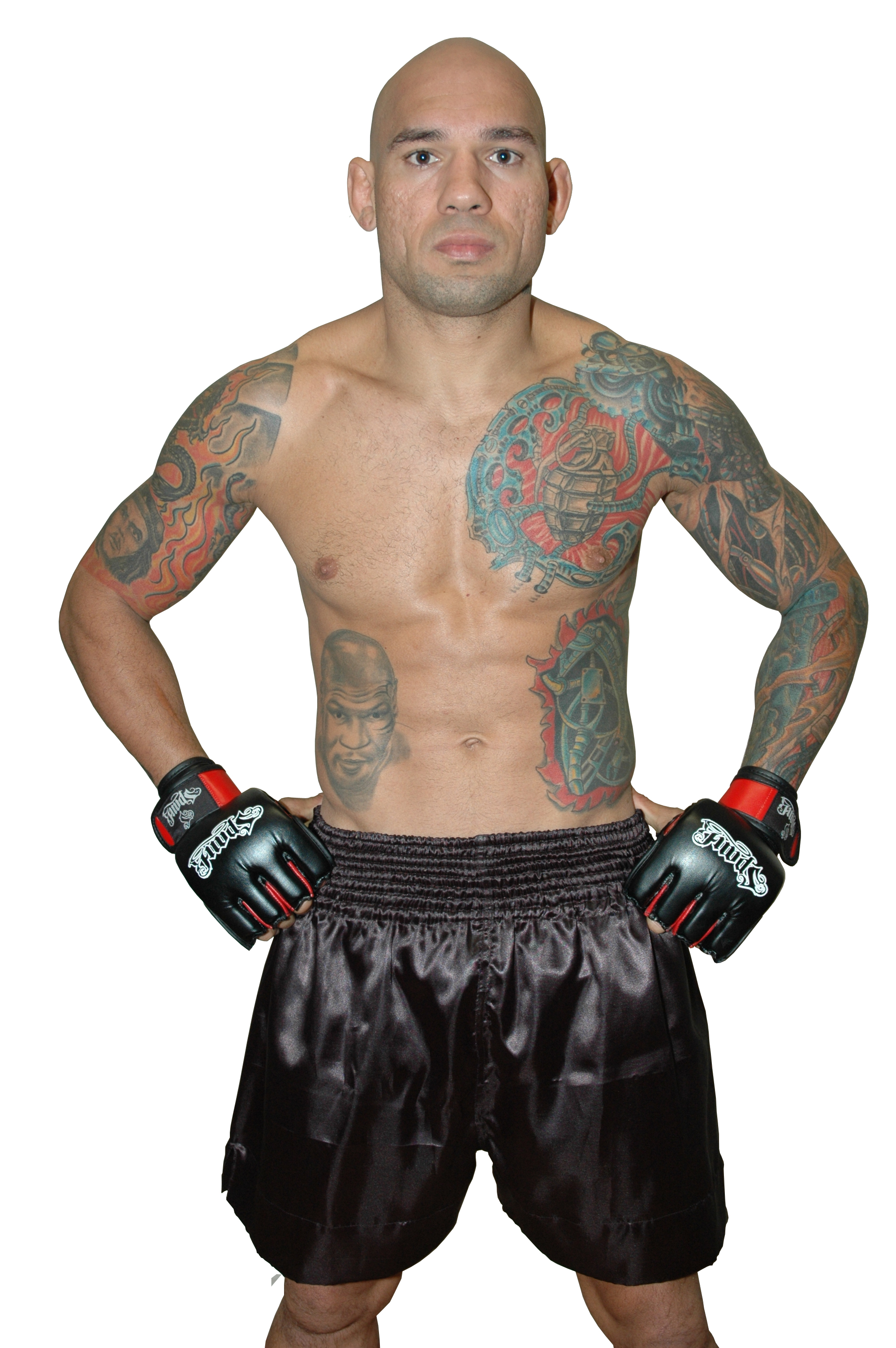
- Santos in 2010
- Born: 12 December 1977 (age 48); Rondonópolis, Mato Grosso, Brazil
- Other names: Cyborg
- Height: 5 ft 10 in (1.78 m)
- Weight: 170 lb (77 kg; 12 st 2 lb)
- Division: Light Heavyweight; Middleweight; Welterweight
- Reach: 71 in (180 cm)
- Fighting out of: Houston, Texas, U.S.
- Team: Chute Boxe Academy; The Arena
- Rank: Black belt in Brazilian Jiu-Jitsu under Cristiano Marcello
- Years active: 1997–2014, 2015–2016

Mixed martial arts record
- Total: 39
- Wins: 21
- By knockout: 14
- By submission: 4
- By decision: 3
- Losses: 18
- By knockout: 12
- By submission: 2
- By decision: 4

Other information
- Notable relatives: Cristiane "Cyborg" Santos (divorced)
- Mixed martial arts record from Sherdog

Evangelista Santos (Brazilian Portuguese pronunciation: [evɐ̃ʒeˈlistɐ ˈsɐ̃tus]; born December 12, 1977) is a Brazilian retired mixed martial artist. A professional from 1997 until 2016, Santos competed for Strikeforce, Bellator MMA, the PRIDE Fighting Championships, Cage Rage, International Vale Tudo Championships, Pancrase, Jungle Fight, Legacy FC, and World Victory Road. Known for his exciting fighting style, 14 of his 21 wins ended via knockout. Santos is a former runner up for the Strikeforce Welterweight Title.

== Background ==
Born and raised in the city of Rondonopolis, Santos did not have a particularly safe upbringing; at the age of 12, he was introduced to cockfighting, which was popular and not yet illegal in Brazil. After training and taking care of fighting roosters for five more years, he began training in kickboxing which eventually led him to vale tudo at the age of 18. Santos was also a four-time Brazilian national champion in Muay Thai.

== Mixed martial arts career ==
=== Early career ===
Santos turned professional when he was 20 years old and began his career 2-0 before facing legendary Brazilian fighter Jose "Pele" Landi-Jons, losing by TKO. Santos won his first two fights with the British Cage Rage organization before returning to Brazil's Jungle Fight, winning over future KSW Middleweight Champion Michal Materla by knockout, which is Materla's only knockout loss of his career to date. Santos then fought against Dutch kickboxer Melvin "No Mercy" Manhoef for the Cage Rage World Light Heavyweight Championship. The two fought a highly-entertaining bout, trading punches but Santos ultimately lost after being knocked out. Santos won his next two fights, including a majority decision over future UFC veteran Francis Carmont before making his debut in PRIDE FC.

=== PRIDE Fighting Championships ===
Santos made his debut in Japan's PRIDE FC against submission specialist Kazuhiro Nakamura, losing by a keylock submission. His next fight with the Japanese organization was against Japanese professional boxer Yosuke Nishijima, which Santos won by a rear-naked choke submission.

=== World Victory Road ===
Santos fought again for the Cage Rage World Light Heavyweight Championship against James Zikic but lost by unanimous decision. Santos also lost his next fight against Armenian superstar Gegard Mousasi by TKO before making his debut in World Victory Road Presents: Sengoku Raiden Championships against Makoto Takimoto, winning by an achilles lock. Santos fought once more for the Japanese organization against future UFC veteran Siyar Bahadurzada, losing by TKO after receiving an arm injury.

=== Strikeforce ===
Santos made his Strikeforce debut June 19, 2009, and headlined the Strikeforce Challengers: Villasenor vs. Cyborg event, but came up short against former King of the Cage Middleweight Champion Joey Villasenor losing by a split decision. In his next fight, he went on to face and defeat Marius Zaromskis, who battled Nick Diaz for the vacant Strikeforce Welterweight Title.

Santos challenged Strikeforce Welterweight Champion Nick Diaz for the title on January 29, 2011, at the HP Pavilion in San Jose, California. He lost the fight via armbar submission in the second round.

Santos was due to fight Paul Daley at Strikeforce: Fedor vs. Henderson but was forced to withdraw due to a shoulder injury. Santos fought Strikeforce newcomer Jordan Mein on September 10, 2011, at Strikeforce World Grand Prix: Barnett vs. Kharitonov. After a grueling back and forth fight "Cyborg" was defeated by Mein via TKO due to Elbows in the third round handing "Cyborg" back to back defeats, Santos has now suffered his fourth loss in his last six fights.

After a long period of inactivity, Santos requested his release from Strikeforce to fight more consistently. His request was granted.

=== Legacy Fighting Championship ===
Santos was expected to face Pete Spratt at Legacy Fighting Championship 17 on February 1, 2013. However, Santos was forced to pull out of the bout due to injury and was replaced by Dan Hornbuckle.

After nearly two years away from the sport, Santos returned to face Artenas Young in the main event during Legacy Fighting Championship 50 on January 22, 2016. He won the fight by unanimous decision.

=== Gringo Super Fight ===
Santos made his GSF debut on April 28, 2014, against Melvin Manhoef in a rematch from 2006. Santos, who was knocked out by Manhoef in their first outing, lost to Manhoef again via first-round knockout. Santos then announced his retirement shortly after the fight.

=== Bellator MMA ===
On March 1, 2016, it was announced that Santos signed a multi-fight contract with Bellator MMA.

Santos made his organizational debut April 22 on the main card of Bellator 153 in a welterweight matchup beating Brennan Ward via first round submission.

Making a quick turnaround, Santos agreed to fight Saad Awad at Bellator 154 on May 14, 2016, but lost.

On July 16, 2016, Santos faced Michael "Venom" Page and was defeated via KO by a flying knee, resulting in a frontal sinus fracture.

Santos retired in January 2017. He spent a year coaching in Curitiba, Brazil. In early 2018 he returned to the USA and is coaching in his own gym in Texas. In August 2018 Santos confirmed he had no plans to return to competition.

== Personal life ==
Santos was married to women's MMA fighter Cristiane Justino from 2005 to December 2011. It was during this time she adopted his nickname for herself.

== Mixed martial arts record ==
Professional record breakdown
39 matches	21 wins	18 losses
By knockout	14	12
By submission	4	2
By decision	3	4

Res.	Record	Opponent	Method	Event	Date	Round	Time	Location	Notes
Loss	21–18	Michael Page	KO (flying knee)	Bellator 158	July 16, 2016	2	4:31	London, United Kingdom	
Loss	21–17	Saad Awad	TKO (punches)	Bellator 154	May 14, 2016	1	4:31	San Jose, California, United States	
Win	21–16	Brennan Ward	Submission (heel hook)	Bellator 153	April 22, 2016	1	0:30	Uncasville, Connecticut, United States	
Win	20–16	Artenas Young	Decision (unanimous)	Legacy FC 50	January 22, 2016	3	5:00	Houston, Texas, United States	
Loss	19–16	Melvin Manhoef	TKO (punches)	Gringo Super Fight 10	April 27, 2014	1	0:46	Rio de Janeiro, Brazil	For the vacant Gringo Super Fight Welterweight Championship.
Win	19–15	Elton Rodrigues	TKO (punches)	Warriors of God	August 17, 2013	1	1:37	Uberlandia, Minas Gerais, Brazil	
Loss	18–15	Jordan Mein	TKO (elbows)	Strikeforce: Barnett vs. Kharitonov	September 10, 2011	3	3:18	Cincinnati, Ohio, United States	
Loss	18–14	Nick Diaz	Submission (armbar)	Strikeforce: Diaz vs. Cyborg	January 29, 2011	2	4:50	San Jose, California, United States	For the Strikeforce Welterweight Championship.
Win	18–13	Marius Žaromskis	TKO (punches)	Strikeforce: Los Angeles	June 16, 2010	1	2:38	Los Angeles, California, United States	
Win	17–13	Daniel Zarate	TKO (head kick and punches)	Samurai Fight Combat 2	December 12, 2009	1	1:41	Curitiba, Brazil	Welterweight debut.
Loss	16–13	Joey Villasenor	Decision (split)	Strikeforce Challengers: Villasenor vs. Cyborg	June 19, 2009	3	5:00	Kent, Washington, United States	
Loss	16–12	Siyar Bahadurzada	TKO (arm injury)	World Victory Road Presents: Sengoku 5	September 28, 2008	1	0:35	Tokyo, Japan	
Win	16–11	Makoto Takimoto	Submission (achilles lock)	World Victory Road Presents: Sengoku First Battle	March 5, 2008	1	4:51	Tokyo, Japan	
Loss	15–11	Gegard Mousasi	TKO (punches)	HCF: Destiny	February 1, 2008	1	3:42	Calgary, Canada	Middleweight debut.
Loss	15–10	James Zikic	Decision (unanimous)	Cage Rage 21	April 21, 2007	5	5:00	London, United Kingdom	For the Cage Rage World Light Heavyweight Championship.
Win	15–9	Yosuke Nishijima	Submission (rear-naked choke)	PRIDE FC: Final Conflict Absolute	September 10, 2006	1	3:24	Saitama, Japan	
Loss	14–9	Kazuhiro Nakamura	Submission (americana)	PRIDE FC: Critical Countdown Absolute	July 1, 2006	1	4:49	Saitama, Japan	
Win	14–8	Francis Carmont	Decision (majority)	WFC: Europe vs Brazil	May 20, 2006	3	5:00	Koper, Slovenia	
Win	13–8	Roberto Godoi	Decision (unanimous)	Show Fight 4	April 6, 2006	3	5:00	São Paulo, Brazil	
Loss	12–8	Melvin Manhoef	KO (punches)	Cage Rage 15	February 4, 2006	2	3:51	London, United Kingdom	For the Cage Rage World Light Heavyweight Championship.
Win	12–7	Michal Materla	KO (punches)	Jungle Fight 5	November 26, 2005	2	2:03	Manaus, Brazil	
Win	11–7	Darren Little	TKO (corner stoppage)	Cage Rage 13	September 10, 2005	1	0:55	London, United Kingdom	
Win	10–7	Kassim Annan	TKO (submission to soccer kicks)	Meca World Vale Tudo 12	July 9, 2005	1	3:43	Rio de Janeiro, Brazil	
Win	9–7	Mark Epstein	TKO (punches)	Cage Rage 11	April 30, 2005	1	2:16	London, United Kingdom	
Loss	8–7	Antony Rea	TKO (punches)	Cage Rage 10	February 26, 2005	2	1:55	London, United Kingdom	
Loss	8–6	Yuki Kondo	Decision (unanimous)	Pancrase: Brave 10	November 7, 2004	3	5:00	Tokyo, Japan	
Loss	8–5	Claudio Godoi	TKO (punches)	Conquista Fight 1	December 20, 2003	3	2:23	Bahia, Brazil	
Win	8–4	Lucas Lopes	TKO (punches and leg kick)	Jungle Fight 1	September 13, 2003	2	4:08	Manaus, Brazil	
Loss	7–4	Maurício Rua	TKO (punches)	Meca World Vale Tudo 9	August 1, 2003	1	8:12	Rio de Janeiro, Brazil	
Win	7–3	Gabriel Santos	KO (knee)	K-NOCK	July 23, 2003	1	1:01	Rio de Janeiro, Brazil	
Win	6–3	Osami Shibuya	KO (punch)	Pancrase: Hybrid 5	May 18, 2003	1	1:20	Yokohama, Japan	
Win	5–3	Silvio de Souza	KO (punch)	Meca World Vale Tudo 7	November 8, 2002	1	0:10	Curitiba, Brazil	
Loss	4–3	Angelo Araujo	TKO (punches)	IVC 14: USA vs Brazil	November 11, 2001	1	8:46	Caracas, Venezuela	
Win	4–2	Jefferson Silva	KO (punch)	IVC 14: USA vs Brazil	November 11, 2001	1	2:28	Caracas, Venezuela	
Win	3–2	Aaron Sullivan	TKO (punches)	IVC 14: USA vs Brazil	November 11, 2001	1	0:13	Caracas, Venezuela	
Loss	2–2	Jorge Magalhaes	Decision (unanimous)	Heroes 2	June 30, 2001	1	12:00	Rio de Janeiro, Brazil	
Loss	2–1	Jose Landi-Jons	TKO (punches)	BVF 8: Campeonato Brasileiro de Vale Tudo 2	November 20, 1997	1	8:18	Brazil	
Win	2–0	Adriano Verdelli	TKO (submission to punches)	BVF 8: Campeonato Brasileiro de Vale Tudo 2	November 20, 1997	1	1:56	Brazil	
Win	1–0	Roberto Pereira	Submission (rear-naked choke)	BVF 8: Campeonato Brasileiro de Vale Tudo 2	November 20, 1997	1	2:37	Brazil	

== See also ==
- List of Bellator MMA alumni
- List of Strikeforce alumni
