= Yuki Kondo =

Japanese mixed martial arts fighter

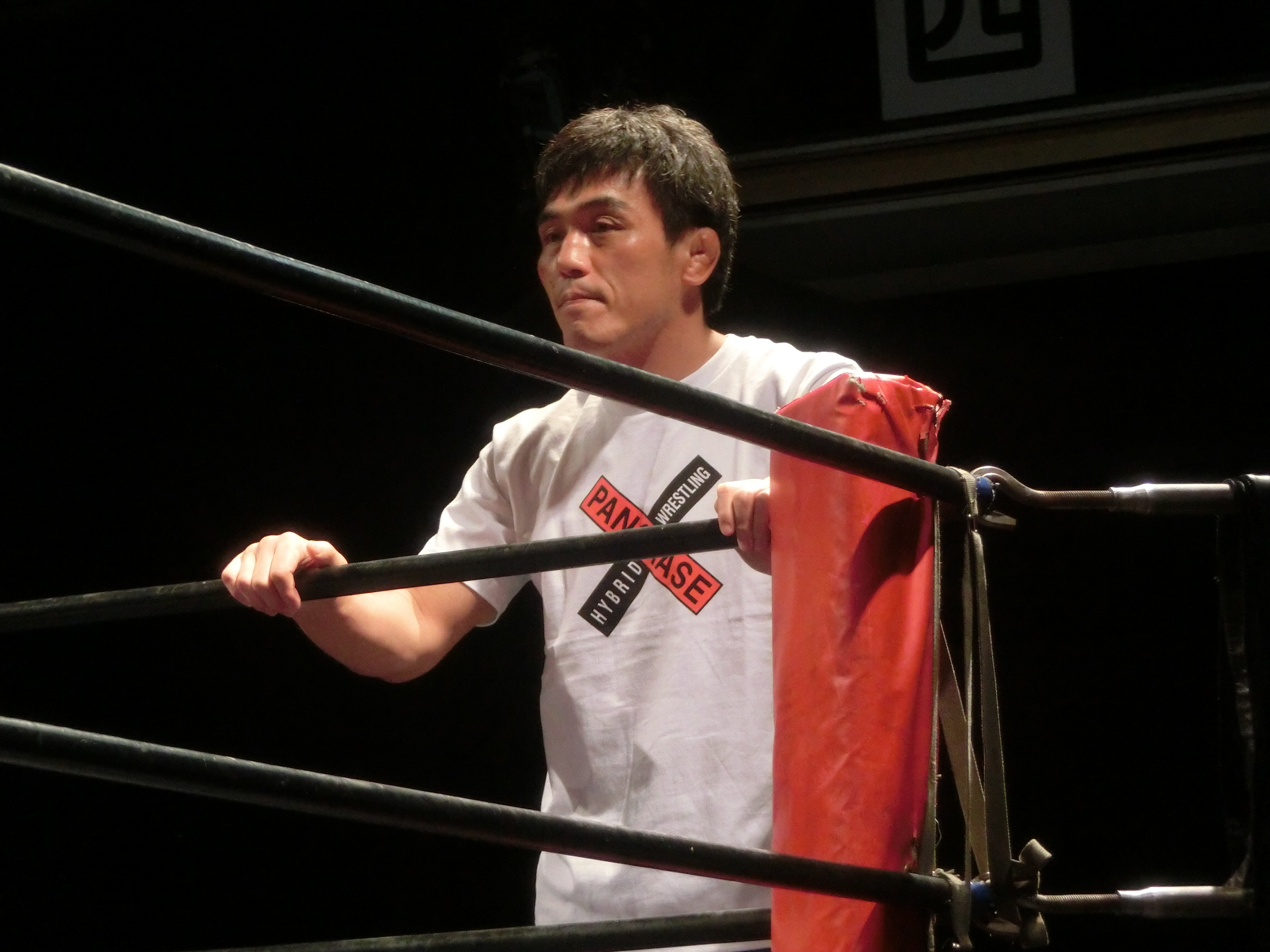
- Born: Kondō Tamotsu; July 17, 1975 (age 51); Nagaoka city, Niigata Prefecture, Japan
- Other names: Sora
- Weight: 160 lb (73 kg; 11 st 6 lb)
- Division: Light Heavyweight; Middleweight; Welterweight; Lightweight
- Style: Shorinji Kempo
- Stance: Orthodox
- Fighting out of: Tokyo, Japan
- Team: Pancrase-ism
- Rank: 2nd dan black belt in Shorinji Kempo
- Years active: 1996–present

Mixed martial arts record
- Total: 116
- Wins: 66
- By knockout: 21
- By submission: 16
- By decision: 29
- Losses: 41
- By knockout: 6
- By submission: 9
- By decision: 26
- Draws: 9

Other information
- Mixed martial arts record from Sherdog

Yuki Kondo (近藤 有己, Kondō Yūki; [kondoː jɯːki]; born July 17, 1975) is a Japanese mixed martial artist currently competing in the Welterweight division. He has 112 professional fights, making him one of the mixed martial artists with the most bouts on record. He has also competed for the UFC, PRIDE, Sengoku, Palace Fighting Championships, BodogFIGHT, and DEEP. He has competed overseas only four times, and holds a record of 2–2. He is the former Pancrase Light Heavyweight Champion as well as the former Pancrase Middleweight Champion and Pancrase Openweight Champion.

== Background ==
Kondo is from Niigata, Japan, began Shorinji Kempo in high school, and is currently a second dan rank.

== Mixed martial arts career ==
=== Pancrase ===
Kondo made his professional debut for the Pancrase organization in Japan in early 1996 when he was 21 years old at the Pancrase: Truth 1. His decision to compete for Pancrase was heavily influenced by Masakatsu Funaki being the co-founder, as Kondo looked up to the professional wrestler Funaki. Kondo won his debut by a guillotine choke submission in the first round and would go to reach a 7–0–1 record, before he was handed his first career loss by Jason DeLucia in a decision. He would then defeat DeLucia in a rematch via toe hold submission. All but one of Kondo's first 38 career fights were under the Pancrase banner, and he held a record of 31-4-3 with wins over Minoru Suzuki, Semmy Schilt (2x), Keiichiro Yamamiya (2x), Pete Williams, Guy Mezger, Masakatsu Funaki, Ikuhisa Minowa, Jason DeLucia, Kazuo Takahashi, and Manabu Yamada before making his UFC debut.

=== UFC ===
Kondo made his UFC and overseas debut on September 22, 2000 at UFC 27 in New Orleans, Louisiana against Brazilian Alexandre Dantas. Kondo won via TKO in the third round in a highly-entertaining bout. Kondo then fought for the UFC Light Heavyweight Championship Tito Ortiz, who would be making his first title defense at UFC 29 in Japan. After rocking Ortiz with a flying knee early in the fight, Kondo would lose the bout via cobra choke submission at 1:52 into the first round. Three fights later, Kondo returned to the UFC at UFC 32 to face Vladimir Matyushenko and lost via unanimous decision.

=== Post-UFC ===
Kondo then received his second consecutive unanimous decision loss in his debut for the DEEP organization in Japan against Paulo Filho. Kondo then went 8-1-3 with wins over Akihoro Gono and Josh Barnett before facing Sanae Kikuta for the Light Heavyweight King of Pancrase title. The two had fought to a draw two fights before but Kondo won the rematch via knockout in the third round before making his debut in the PRIDE organization.

=== PRIDE ===
Kondo made his PRIDE debut against Mario Sperry at Pride Shockwave 2003 on December 31, 2003 and won via TKO in the first round. He returned three fights later to face Wanderlei Silva at Pride Final Conflict 2004 and was dominated, losing by knockout in the first round after he was stomped repeatedly by Silva. This was the first time Kondo had lost by knockout or technical knockout in his career. Kondo would then go on to lose his next five bouts with the organization, including a rematch with Akihiro Gono and another knockout loss at the hands of Phil Baroni at Pride Bushido 10.

=== Return to Pancrase ===
After the loss to Gono, Kondo went 8–1–1, with wins over Trevor Prangley and Yuki Sasaki, dropping down to the Middleweight division in between fights before becoming the Middleweight King of Pancrase with a unanimous decision win over Ichiro Kanai. After a unanimous decision loss in Cage Force to Rikuhei Fujii, Kondo faced Fujii in a rematch for Kondo's Pancrase title, and Kondo lost again via unanimous decision.

== Championships and accomplishments ==
- Pancrase Hybrid Wrestling
  - Pancrase 1996 Truth Tour Neo Blood Tournament winner
  - Pancrase Light Heavyweight Championship (One time)
    - One successful title defense
  - Pancrase Middleweight Championship (One time)
    - One successful title defense
  - Pancrase Interim Middleweight Championship (One time)
    - Three successful title defenses
  - Pancrase Openweight Championship (Two times)
    - Two combined successful title defenses
- Ultimate Fighting Championship
  - UFC Encyclopedia Awards
    - Fight of the Night (One time) vs. Tito Ortiz
    - Knockout of the Night (One time) vs. Alexandre Dantas
- Tokyo Sports
  - Rookie of the Year (1996)
  - Technique Award (1997)

== Mixed martial arts record ==
Professional record breakdown
116 matches	66 wins	41 losses
By knockout	21	6
By submission	16	9
By decision	29	26
Draws	9	

Res.	Record	Opponent	Method	Event	Date	Round	Time	Location	Notes
Loss	66–41–9	Akihiro Gono	Decision (unanimous)	DEEP 127 Impact	September 15, 2025	2	5:00	Tokyo, Japan	Catchweight (161 lb) bout.
Win	66–40–9	Akihiro Mori	Decision (unanimous)	DEEP 122 Impact	November 4, 2024	2	5:00	Tokyo, Japan	Catchweight (161 lb) bout.
Loss	65–40–9	Wataru Miki	Decision (unanimous)	Pancrase 340	December 24, 2023	3	5:00	Yokohama, Japan	Catchweight (158 lb) bout.
Loss	65–39–9	Takenori Sato	Decision (unanimous)	Pancrase 335	July 9, 2023	3	5:00	Tokyo, Japan	
Win	65–38–9	Tetsuya Izuchi	Decision (unanimous)	Gleat MMA Ver.0	December 14, 2022	3	5:00	Tokyo, Japan	Catchweight (161 lb) bout.
Win	64–38–9	Kazuhito Suzuki	Decision (unanimous)	Pancrase 327	April 29, 2022	3	5:00	Tokyo, Japan	Catchweight (161 lb) bout.
Loss	63–38–9	Kazuki	Decision (unanimous)	Pancrase 325	December 11, 2021	3	5:00	Tokyo, Japan	
Win	63–37–9	Yoshinori Suzuki	Decision (split)	Pancrase 321	May 30, 2021	3	5:00	Tokyo, Japan	
Loss	62–37–9	Yutaka Kobayashi	Decision (unanimous)	Pancrase 319	October 25, 2020	3	5:00	Tokyo, Japan	
Win	62–36–9	Nicolas Martinez Paz	TKO (punches)	Ismos 1	July 31, 2020	1	4:08	Yokohama, Japan	
Loss	61–36–9	Akihiro Murayama	Decision (unanimous)	Pancrase 312	February 16, 2020	3	5:00	Tokyo, Japan	
Win	61–35–9	Akihiro Gono	Decision (unanimous)	Pancrase 305	May 26, 2019	3	3:00	Tokyo, Japan	
Loss	60–35–9	Renzo Gracie	Submission (rear-naked choke)	ONE: Reign of Kings	July 27, 2018	2	1:40	Pasay, Philippines	Middleweight bout.
Loss	60–34–9	Jutaro Nakao	TKO (punches)	Pancrase vs. DEEP	December 24, 2017	2	0:57	Hyogo, Japan	
Win	60–33–9	Ikuhisa Minowa	Decision (unanimous)	Pancrase 288	July 2, 2017	3	3:00	Tokyo, Japan	Middleweight bout.
Loss	59–33–9	Takaaki Nara	Decision (unanimous)	Pancrase 285	March 12, 2017	3	3:00	Tokyo, Japan	
Loss	59–32–9	Hiroki Tanaka	Decision (unanimous)	Pancrase: Osaka	December 11, 2016	3	3:00	Osaka, Japan	
Loss	59–31–9	Akihiro Takanabe	Decision (unanimous)	Pancrase 279	July 24, 2016	3	3:00	Tokyo, Japan	
Win	59–30–9	Kenji Kawaguchi	KO (punch)	Pancrase 271	November 1, 2015	1	3:52	Tokyo, Japan	Openweight bout.
Loss	58–30–9	Shingo Suzuki	TKO (punches)	Pancrase 265	March 15, 2015	1	4:56	Tokyo, Japan	
Loss	58–29–9	Gota Yamashita	Decision (unanimous)	Pancrase 263	December 6, 2014	3	5:00	Tokyo, Japan	For the Pancrase Welterweight Championship.
Win	58–28–9	Eiji Ishikawa	TKO (punches)	Pancrase 260	August 10, 2014	1	0:39	Tokyo, Japan	
Win	57–28–9	Masayuki Naruse	Decision (majority)	Pancrase 257	March 30, 2014	2	5:00	Yokohama, Kanagawa, Japan	Openweight bout.
Win	56–28–9	Toshikazu Suzuki	KO (head kick)	Pancrase 256	February 2, 2014	1	1:15	Tokyo, Japan	
Draw	55–28–9	Eric Michael Fought	Draw (majority)	Pancrase 253	November 3, 2013	2	5:00	Tokyo, Japan	
Loss	55–28–8	Akihiro Murayama	Decision (unanimous)	Pancrase 248	June 30, 2013	3	5:00	Differ Ariake, Tokyo, Japan	
Win	55–27–8	Hiromitsu Kanehara	Decision (points)	U-Spirits: U-Spirits Again	March 9, 2013	1	20:00	Korakuen Hall, Tokyo, Japan	
Win	54–27–8	Kosei Kubota	KO (punch)	Pancrase Progress Tour 12: All Eyes on Yuki Kondo	November 10, 2012	1	0:52	Tokyo, Japan	
Loss	53–27–8	Kenji Nagaki	TKO (corner stoppage)	Pancrase Progress Tour 1	January 28, 2012	2	2:40	Tokyo, Japan	
Win	53–26–8	Yuta Nakamura	Decision (unanimous)	Pancrase: Impressive Tour 10	October 2, 2011	2	5:00	Tokyo, Japan	
Loss	52–26–8	Hiroki Nagaoka	Decision (unanimous)	Pancrase: Impressive Tour 1	February 6, 2011	2	5:00	Tokyo, Japan	Return to Welterweight.
Loss	52–25–8	Rikuhei Fujii	Decision (unanimous)	Pancrase: Passion Tour 11	December 5, 2010	3	5:00	Tokyo, Japan	Lost the Pancrase Middleweight Championship.
Loss	52–24–8	Rikuhei Fujii	Decision (unanimous)	GCM: Cage Force 19	September 26, 2010	3	5:00	Tokyo, Japan	
Draw	52–23–8	Yuji Hisamatsu	Draw	Pancrase: Passion Tour 6	July 4, 2010	3	5:00	Tokyo, Japan	Retained the Pancrase Middleweight Championship.
Win	52–23–7	Ichiro Kanai	Decision (unanimous)	Pancrase: Passion Tour 4	April 29, 2010	3	5:00	Tokyo, Japan	Return to Middleweight. Won the Pancrase Middleweight Championship.
Win	51–23–7	Takenori Sato	Decision (unanimous)	Pancrase: Passion Tour 1	February 7, 2010	3	5:00	Tokyo, Japan	
Draw	50–23–7	Yuji Hisamatsu	Draw (unanimous)	Pancrase: Changing Tour 6	October 25, 2009	3	5:00	Tokyo, Japan	
Win	50–23–6	Ki Bum Kim	TKO (kick to the body and punches)	Pancrase: Changing Tour 4	August 8, 2009	1	1:52	Tokyo, Japan	Welterweight debut.
Loss	49–23–6	Yuki Sasaki	Submission (rear-naked choke)	World Victory Road Presents: Sengoku 5	September 28, 2008	2	1:08	Tokyo, Japan	
Win	49–22–6	Ryuji Ohori	KO (soccer kick)	Pancrase: Shining 6	August 27, 2008	2	2:41	Tokyo, Japan	Return to Middleweight.
Loss	48–22–6	Roger Gracie	Submission (rear-naked choke)	World Victory Road Presents: Sengoku 2	May 18, 2008	1	2:40	Tokyo, Japan	
Loss	48–21–6	Keiichiro Yamamiya	Decision (majority)	Pancrase: Shining 3	April 27, 2008	3	5:00	Tokyo, Japan	
Win	48–20–6	August Wallen	Decision (unanimous)	PFP: Ring of Fire	December 9, 2007	3	5:00	Manila, Philippines	
Win	47–20–6	Yuji Sakuragi	Decision (unanimous)	Pancrase: Rising 8	October 14, 2007	3	5:00	Tokyo, Japan	
Loss	46–20–6	Trevor Prangley	TKO (doctor stoppage)	BodogFIGHT: Alvarez vs. Lee	July 14, 2007	2	5:00	Trenton, New Jersey, United States	
Loss	46–19–6	Akihiro Gono	Decision (split)	PRIDE FC: Shockwave 2006	December 31, 2006	2	5:00	Saitama, Japan	Middleweight bout.
Win	46–18–6	Ian Nai	Submission (rear-naked choke)	Pancrase: Blow 11	December 10, 2006	1	1:30	Tokyo, Japan	
Draw	45–18–6	Jean-François Lénogue	Draw	Pancrase: Blow 8	October 1, 2006	3	5:00	Osaka, Japan	
Win	45–18–5	Daijiro Matsui	Decision (unanimous)	Pancrase: Blow 6	August 27, 2006	3	5:00	Yokohama, Kanagawa, Japan	Defended the Pancrase Light Heavyweight Championship.
Loss	44–18–5	Phil Baroni	KO (punch)	PRIDE: Bushido 10	April 2, 2006	1	0:25	Tokyo, Japan	Middleweight bout.
Loss	44–17–5	Kazuhiro Nakamura	Decision (unanimous)	PRIDE FC: Shockwave 2005	December 31, 2005	3	5:00	Saitama, Japan	
Win	44–16–5	Hiromitsu Kanehara	Decision (unanimous)	Pancrase: Spiral 8	October 2, 2005	3	5:00	Yokohama, Kanagawa, Japan	
Loss	43–16–5	Igor Vovchanchyn	Decision (unanimous)	PRIDE FC: Total Elimination 2005	April 23, 2005	3	5:00	Osaka, Japan	
Loss	43–15–5	Dan Henderson	Decision (split)	PRIDE Shockwave 2004	December 31, 2004	3	5:00	Saitama, Japan	
Win	43–14–5	Evangelista Santos	Decision (unanimous)	Pancrase: Brave 10	November 7, 2004	3	5:00	Urayasu, Chiba, Japan	
Loss	42–14–5	Wanderlei Silva	KO (stomps)	PRIDE Final Conflict 2004	August 15, 2004	1	2:46	Saitama, Japan	
Win	42–13–5	Shannon Ritch	Submission (kneebar)	Pancrase: Brave 6	June 22, 2004	1	1:01	Tokyo, Japan	
Win	41–13–5	Steve Heath	Submission (rear-naked choke)	Pancrase: Brave 3	March 29, 2004	1	4:01	Tokyo, Japan	Heavyweight bout.
Win	40–13–5	Mario Sperry	TKO (doctor stoppage)	PRIDE Shockwave 2003	December 31, 2003	1	3:27	Saitama, Japan	
Win	39–13–5	Sanae Kikuta	KO (punch)	Pancrase: Hybrid 10	November 30, 2003	3	0:08	Tokyo, Japan	Won the Pancrase Light Heavyweight Championship.
Loss	38–13–5	Josh Barnett	Submission (rear-naked choke)	Pancrase: 10th Anniversary Show	August 31, 2003	3	3:26	Tokyo, Japan	Heavyweight bout.
Draw	38–12–5	Sanae Kikuta	Draw	Pancrase: Hybrid 5	May 18, 2003	3	5:00	Yokohama, Kanagawa, Japan	For the Pancrase Light Heavyweight Championship.
Win	38–12–4	Sumio Koyano	TKO (corner stoppage)	Pancrase: Hybrid 3	March 8, 2003	1	3:58	Tokyo, Japan	
Draw	37–12–4	Gabriel Vella	Draw	Pancrase: Hybrid 1	January 26, 2003	2	5:00	Tokyo, Japan	
Win	37–12–3	Tsuyoshi Kurihara	Submission (rear-naked choke)	Pancrase: Spirit 9	December 21, 2002	1	4:49	Tokyo, Japan	
Win	36–12–3	Yoshinori Momose	Submission (punches)	Pancrase: 2002 Neo-Blood Tournament Opening Round	July 28, 2002	2	3:51	Tokyo, Japan	
Loss	35–12–3	Yoshinori Momose	Decision (majority)	Premium Challenge	May 6, 2002	1	10:00	Tokyo, Japan	
Win	35–11–3	Nestor Martinez	Submission (armbar)	Deep: 4th Impact	March 30, 2002	1	1:58	Nagoya, Aichi, Japan	
Win	34–11–3	Eiji Ishikawa	Decision (unanimous)	Pancrase: Spirit 2	February 17, 2002	2	5:00	Osaka, Japan	Middleweight bout.
Win	33–11–3	Mitsuyoshi Sato	TKO (punches)	Pancrase: Spirit 1	January 27, 2002	2	0:32	Tokyo, Japan	
Win	32–11–3	Akihiro Gono	TKO (corner stoppage)	Pancrase: Proof 7	December 1, 2001	3	0:52	Yokohama, Kanagawa, Japan	
Loss	31–11–3	Paulo Filho	Decision (unanimous)	DEEP: 2nd Impact	August 18, 2001	3	5:00	Yokohama, Kanagawa, Japan	
Loss	31–10–3	Vladimir Matyushenko	Decision (unanimous)	UFC 32	June 29, 2001	5	5:00	East Rutherford, New Jersey, United States	
Win	31–9–3	Brian Gassaway	Submission (toe hold)	Pancrase: Proof 2	March 31, 2001	1	1:45	Kadoma, Osaka, Japan	
Win	30–9–3	Eiji Ishikawa	TKO (doctor stoppage)	Pancrase: Proof 1	February 4, 2001	3	4:16	Tokyo, Japan	Heavyweight bout.
Loss	29–9–3	Tito Ortiz	Submission (cobra choke)	UFC 29	December 16, 2000	1	1:52	Tokyo, Japan	Return to Light Heavyweight. For the UFC Light Heavyweight Championship.
Win	29–8–3	Alexandre Dantas	TKO (strikes)	UFC 27	September 22, 2000	3	2:28	New Orleans, Louisiana, United States	Middleweight debut.
Win	28–8–3	Dan Theodore	Submission (kneebar)	Pancrase: 2000 Neo-Blood Tournament Opening Round	July 23, 2000	1	3:08	Tokyo, Japan	
Win	27–8–3	Saulo Ribeiro	TKO (punches)	Colosseum 2000	May 26, 2000	1	0:22	Japan	Heavyweight bout.
Win	26–8–3	Manabu Yamada	Decision (unanimous)	Pancrase: Trans 1	January 23, 2000	1	10:00	Tokyo, Japan	Light Heavyweight debut.
Loss	25–8–3	Semmy Schilt	Submission (rear-naked choke)	Pancrase: Breakthrough 10	November 28, 1999	1	2:28	Kadoma, Osaka, Japan	Lost the Pancrase Openweight Championship.
Win	25–7–3	Kiuma Kunioku	KO (flying knee and palm strikes)	Pancrase: 1999 Anniversary Show	September 18, 1999	1	0:34	Urayasu, Chiba, Japan	Defended the Pancrase Openweight Championship.
Win	24–7–3	Jason Godsey	Submission (toe hold)	Pancrase: 1999 Neo-Blood Tournament Opening Round	August 1, 1999	1	5:08	Tokyo, Japan	
Win	23–7–3	Daisuke Watanabe	KO (punch)	Pancrase: Breakthrough 7	July 16, 1999	1	0:21	Tokyo, Japan	
Win	22–7–3	Semmy Schilt	Decision (lost points)	Pancrase: Breakthrough 4	April 18, 1999	1	20:00	Yokohama, Kanagawa, Japan	Won the vacant Pancrase Openweight Championship.
Loss	21–7–3	Kiuma Kunioku	Decision (unanimous)	Pancrase: Breakthrough 3	March 9, 1999	1	15:00	Tokyo, Japan	
Win	21–6–3	Satoshi Hasegawa	TKO (palm strike)	Pancrase: Breakthrough 1	January 19, 1999	1	0:48	Tokyo, Japan	
Loss	20–6–3	Guy Mezger	Decision (majority)	Pancrase: Advance 12	December 19, 1998	1	20:00	Urayasu, Chiba, Japan	
Win	20–5–3	Daisuke Ishii	Submission (toe hold)	Pancrase: Advance 9	October 4, 1998	1	2:38	Tokyo, Japan	
Win	19–5–3	Osami Shibuya	Decision (split)	Pancrase: 1998 Anniversary Show	September 14, 1998	1	20:00	Tokyo, Japan	
Draw	18–5–3	Ryushi Yanagisawa	Draw (unanimous)	Pancrase: 1998 Neo-Blood Tournament Second Round	July 26, 1998	1	20:00	Amori, Japan	
Win	18–5–2	Keiichiro Yamamiya	Decision (majority)	Pancrase: Advance 5	April 26, 1998	1	20:00	Yokohama, Kanagawa, Japan	
Draw	17–5–2	Kiuma Kunioku	Draw (majority)	Pancrase: Advance 2	February 6, 1998	2	3:00	Yokohama, Kanagawa, Japan	
Loss	17–5–1	Masakatsu Funaki	Submission (triangle kimura)	Pancrase: Alive 11	December 20, 1997	1	2:20	Tokyo, Japan	Lost the Pancrase Openweight Championship.
Win	17–4–1	Kazuo Takahashi	Submission (arm-triangle choke)	Pancrase: Alive 10	November 16, 1997	1	7:27	Kobe, Hyogo, Japan	
Win	16–4–1	Leon van Dijk	Decision (unanimous)	Pancrase: Alive 9	October 29, 1997	1	20:00	Tokyo, Japan	
Win	15–4–1	Jason DeLucia	Submission (toe hold)	Pancrase: 1997 Anniversary Show	September 6, 1997	1	27:22	Urayasu, Chiba, Japan	Defended the Pancrase Openweight Championship.
Win	14–4–1	Ikuhisa Minowa	Submission (toe hold)	Pancrase: Alive 8	August 9, 1997	1	5:13	Osaka, Japan	
Loss	13–4–1	Jason Godsey	Submission (neck crank)	Pancrase: 1997 Neo-Blood Tournament, Round 2	July 21, 1997	1	8:17	Tokyo, Japan	
Win	13–3–1	Semmy Schilt	Decision (unanimous)	Pancrase: Alive 7	June 30, 1997	1	20:00	Hakata, Fukuoka, Japan	
Win	12–3–1	Gary Myers	Submission (heel hook)	Pancrase: Alive 5	May 24, 1997	1	5:35	Kobe, Hyogo, Japan	
Win	11–3–1	Masakatsu Funaki	Submission (triangle armbar)	Pancrase: Alive 4	April 27, 1997	1	15:12	Urayasu, Chiba, Japan	Won the Pancrase Openweight Championship.
Win	10–3–1	Kim Jong Wang	Submission (armbar)	Pancrase: Alive 3	March 22, 1997	1	0:25	Nagoya, Aichi, Japan	
Win	9–3–1	Guy Mezger	Decision (lost points)	Pancrase: Alive 2	February 22, 1997	1	20:00	Urayasu, Chiba, Japan	
Win	8–3–1	Kiuma Kunioku	Decision (split)	Pancrase: Alive 1	January 17, 1997	1	20:00	Tokyo, Japan	
Loss	7–3–1	Guy Mezger	Decision (lost points)	Pancrase: Truth 10	December 15, 1996	1	20:00	Tokyo, Japan	
Loss	7–2–1	Masakatsu Funaki	Submission (rear-naked choke)	Pancrase: Truth 9	November 9, 1996	1	1:43	Kobe, Hyogo, Japan	
Loss	7–1–1	Jason DeLucia	Decision (lost points)	Pancrase: Truth 7	October 8, 1996	1	20:00	Nagoya, Aichi, Japan	
Win	7–0–1	Frank Shamrock	KO (head kick)	Pancrase: 1996 Anniversary Show	September 7, 1996	1	12:43	Urayasu, Chiba, Japan	
Win	6–0–1	Pete Williams	Decision (unanimous)	Pancrase: 1996 Neo-Blood Tournament, Round 2	July 23, 1996	1	20:00	Tokyo, Japan	
Win	5–0–1	Keiichiro Yamamiya	TKO (palm strikes)	Pancrase: 1996 Neo-Blood Tournament, Round 2	July 23, 1996	1	6:16	Tokyo, Japan	
Win	4–0–1	Semmy Schilt	Decision (split)	Pancrase: 1996 Neo-Blood Tournament, Round 1	July 22, 1996	1	10:00	Tokyo, Japan	
Win	3–0–1	Minoru Suzuki	Decision (lost points)	Pancrase: Truth 6	June 25, 1996	1	15:00	Fukuoka, Japan	
Draw	2–0–1	Kiuma Kunioku	Draw (majority)	Pancrase: Truth 5	May 16, 1996	1	10:00	Tokyo, Japan	
Win	2–0	Osami Shibuya	Decision (lost points)	Pancrase: Truth 2	March 2, 1996	1	10:00	Kobe, Hyogo, Japan	
Win	1–0	Takafumi Ito	TKO (guillotine choke)	Pancrase: Truth 1	January 28, 1996	1	2:21	Yokohama, Kanagawa, Japan	

=== Mixed martial arts exhibition ===
Exhibition record breakdown		
1 match	0 wins	0 losses
By knockout	0	0
By submission	0	0
By decision	0	0
Draws	1	

Res.	Record	Opponent	Method	Event	Date	Round	Time	Location	Notes
Draw	0–0–1	Minoru Suzuki	Technical Draw	Pancrase 2000 Trans Tour	April 12, 2001	1	3:00	Tokyo, Japan	

== See also ==
- List of Pancrase champions
