= Yōsuke Nishijima =

Japanese mixed martial arts fighter

Yōsuke Nishijima 西島洋介
- Born: May 15, 1973 (age 53); Saitama, Japan
- Other names: Yosukezan; Master Nishi
- Height: 1.80 m (5 ft 11 in)
- Weight: 86 kg (190 lb; 13.5 st)
- Division: Heavyweight; Cruiserweight; Light Heavyweight
- Style: MMA, Boxing, Kickboxing
- Stance: Orthodox
- Team: Takada Dojo

Professional boxing record
- Total: 27
- Wins: 24
- By knockout: 15
- Losses: 2
- By knockout: 1
- Draws: 1

Kickboxing record
- Total: 3
- Wins: 1
- By knockout: 1
- Losses: 2
- By knockout: 1

Mixed martial arts record
- Total: 5
- Wins: 0
- Losses: 5
- By knockout: 2
- By submission: 3

Other information
- Boxing record from BoxRec
- Mixed martial arts record from Sherdog

Yōsuke "Yōsukezan" Nishijima (西島 洋介, Nishijima Yōsuke; born May 15, 1973) is a Japanese professional boxer who has also competed in kickboxing and mixed martial arts.

== Career ==
Debuting as a professional boxer on March 26, 1992, Nishijima compiled a 24–2–1 record, and over the course of his career, won the WBO NABO Cruiserweight title, the OPBF Cruiserweight title and the World Boxing Federation Cruiserweight title. His last boxing bout, a two-round TKO loss to Cecil McKenzie in a California State Cruiserweight title fight, took place on July 10, 2003.

On February 26, 2006, Nishijima debuted in mixed martial arts, at PRIDE 31, taking on Mark Hunt and losing by KO.

Currently Nishijima's record in mixed martial arts is 0–5 with most recent loss to Melvin Manhoef by TKO, took place on December 31, 2007, at K-1 PREMIUM 2007 Dynamite!!.

In 2009 Nishijima competed in two K-1 style kickboxing bouts. He lost to Peter Aerts by KO due to a right leg kick on August 11, 2009, at the K-1 World Grand Prix 2009 in Tokyo Final 16 Qualifying GP. On New Year's Eve 2009 he fought another K-1 style kickboxing bout when he took on Ray Sefo at Dynamite!! 2009 and lost by unanimous decision. He was not allowed to kick during this match, as he was wearing boxing shoes, which ended up giving him a large disadvantage against the Samoan. His kickboxing record is currently 0–2.

In his retirement match, Nishijima defeated Bob Sapp under kickboxing rules at Legend 4 in Kumamoto, Japan on November 17, 2013, although he was not allowed to kick as he chose to wear boxing shoes. He dropped Sapp with a body shot. Sapp stood back up but he finished the business with body shots followed by couple of right hooks.

== Professional boxing record ==
23 Wins (15 knockouts, 7 decisions, 1 Disqualification), 2 Losses (1 knockouts, 1 decisions), 1 Draws
Res.	Record	Opponent	Type	Rd.	Date	Location	Notes
Loss	23–2–1	(United States) Cecil McKenzie	TKO	2 (10)	10 July 2003	(United States) HP Pavilion, San Jose, California	California State Cruiserweight Title, Nishijima down twice in the 2nd
Win	23–1–1	(Cuba) Miguel Aquila	DQ	4	29 March 2002	(United States) Radisson Hotel, Sacramento, California	
Draw	22–1–1	(United States) Darren Whitley	MD	6 (6)	30 November 2001	(United States) Hilton Hotel, Reno, Nevada	
Win	22–1	(United States) Anthony Moore	SD	8 (8)	13 September 1999	(United States) Great Western Forum, Inglewood, California	
Win	21–1	(United States) Ken Hulsey	KO	2 (6)	26 July 1999	(United States) Great Western Forum, Inglewood, California	
Win	20–1	(United States) Ulysses Boulware	KO	5 (6)	21 June 1999	(United States) Great Western Forum, Inglewood, California	
Win	19–1	(United States) Aljenon DeBose	KO	6	22 March 1999	(United States) Great Western Forum, Inglewood, California	
Win	18–1	(Mexico) Eduardo Ayala	PTS	10 (10)	19 March 1998	(United States) Carson, California	
Win	17–1	(United States) Brian LaSpada	UD	12 (12)	11 July 1997	(United States) Tropicana Hotel & Casino, Las Vegas, Nevada	World Boxing Federation cruiserweight title, LaSpada down in the sixth.
Win	16–1	(Pakistan) Hussain Shah	TKO	9	07 December, 1996	Tokyo, Japan	
Win	15–1	(Australia) Peter Kinsella	TKO	3 (12)	05 October, 1996	Kyoto, Japan	vacant OPBF cruiserweight title
Win	14–1	(United States) Todd McPhee	TKO	3	15 July 1996	(United States) Laughlin, Nevada	
Win	13–1	(Mexico) Leonardo Aguilar	UD	12 (12)	09 October, 1995	(United States) Great Western Forum, Inglewood, California	WBO NABO cruiserweight title
Win	12–1	(United States) Krishna Wainwright	KO	9	07 September, 1995	Yokohama, Japan	
Win	11–1	(United States) Gary Butler	KO	8	27 May 1995	Tokyo, Japan	
Win	10–1	(United States) John Kiser	SD	12 (12)	19 February 1995	(United States) Burbank, California	WBO NABO cruiserweight title
Win	9–1	(United States) Keith McMurray	PTS	10 (10)	20 December 1994	Tokyo, Japan	
Win	8–1	(United States) Andre Sherrod	KO	5	17 October 1994	Osaka, Japan	
Win	7–1	(United States) Kennedy McCullough	PTS	6 (6)	21 July 1994	(United States) Irvine, California	
Win	6–1	(United States) Jeon Griffin	KO	5	07 March, 1994	Tokyo, Japan	
Win	5–1	(Mexico) David Mendez	TKO	4	15 November 1993	(United States) Great Western Forum, Inglewood, California	
Loss	4–1	(United States) Ken Milligan	MD	4 (4)	05 October, 1993	(United States) Riviera, Las Vegas, Nevada	
Win	4–0	(Jamaica) Derrick Edwards	KO	3 (4)	03 August, 1993	(United States) Riviera, Las Vegas, Nevada	
Win	3–0	(United States) Tim Thomas	KO	5	18 March 1993	Tokyo, Japan	
Win	2–0	(Japan) Public Akihiko	KO	3	29 October 1992	Saitama, Japan	
Win	1–0	(United States) Ron Smith	KO	3	28 March 1992	Tokyo, Japan	Pro debut

== Kickboxing record ==
Kickboxing record
1 Wins (1 (T)KO's, 0 decisions), 2 Losses
Date	Result	Opponent	Event	Location	Method	Round	Time
2013-11-17	Win	(United States) Bob Sapp	Legend 4	Kumamoto, Japan	TKO (Punches)	1	2:36
2009-12-31	Loss	(New Zealand) Ray Sefo	Dynamite!! 2009	Saitama, Japan	Decision (Unanimous)	3	3:00
2009-08-11	Loss	(Netherlands) Peter Aerts	K-1 World Grand Prix 2009 in Tokyo Final 16 Qualifying GP	Tokyo, Japan	KO (Right Low Kick)	3	1:24
Legend: Win Loss Draw/No contest Notes

== Mixed martial arts record ==
Professional record breakdown
5 matches	0 wins	5 losses
By knockout	0	2
By submission	0	3

Res.	Record	Opponent	Method	Event	Date	Round	Time	Location	Notes
Loss	0–5	Melvin Manhoef	TKO (punches)	K-1 Premium 2007 Dynamite!!	December 31, 2007	1	1:49	Osaka, Japan	
Loss	0–4	Phil Baroni	Technical Submission (kimura)	PRIDE 32: The Real Deal	October 21, 2006	1	3:20	Las Vegas, Nevada, United States	
Loss	0–3	Evangelista Santos	Submission (rear-naked choke)	PRIDE FC: Final Conflict Absolute	September 10, 2006	1	3:24	Saitama, Japan	Middleweight (200 lbs) debut.
Loss	0–2	Hidehiko Yoshida	Submission (triangle choke)	PRIDE FC: Total Elimination Absolute	May 5, 2006	1	2:33	Osaka, Japan	
Loss	0–1	Mark Hunt	KO (punch)	PRIDE 31: Dreamers	February 26, 2006	3	1:18	Saitama, Japan	
