= World Victory Road Presents: Sengoku 5 =

Mixed martial arts event

- The poster for World Victory Road Presents: Sengoku 5
- Promotion: World Victory Road
- Date: September 28, 2008
- Venue: Yoyogi National Gymnasium
- City: Tokyo, Japan
- Attendance: 7,456

Event chronology
World Victory Road Presents: Sengoku 4	World Victory Road Presents: Sengoku 5	World Victory Road Presents: Sengoku 6

World Victory Road Presents: Sengoku 5 was a mixed martial arts event promoted by World Victory Road. The event took place on September 28, 2008 at the Yoyogi National Gymnasium in Tokyo, Japan. It featured the start of World Victory Road's Middleweight Grand Prix tournament.

== Results ==
Main Card
Weight class				Method	Round	Time	Notes
Light heavyweight	Alexandre Ribeiro	def.	Takashi Sugiura	TKO (Knees and Punches)	3	4:18
Heavyweight	Muhammed Lawal	def.	Travis Wiuff	TKO (Punches)	1	2:11
Lightweight	Kiuma Kunioku	def.	A-Sol Kwon	Decision (Unanimous)	3	5:00
Middleweight Grand Prix
Middleweight	Yuki Sasaki	def.	Yuki Kondo	Submission (Rear-Naked Choke)	2	1:08
Middleweight	Kazuhiro Nakamura	def.	Paul Cahoon	Decision (Unanimous)	3	5:00
Middleweight	Jorge Santiago	def.	Logan Clark	Submission (Arm-Triangle Choke)	2	3:55
Middleweight	Siyar Bahadurzada	def.	Evangelista Santos	TKO (Arm Injury)	1	0:22
Lightweight Grand Prix Reserve
Lightweight	Jorge Masvidal	def.	Ryan Schultz	TKO (Punches)	1	1:57

== See also ==
- World Victory Road
- List of Sengoku champions
- 2008 in World Victory Road
