= Sean O'Haire =

American wrestler (1971–2014)

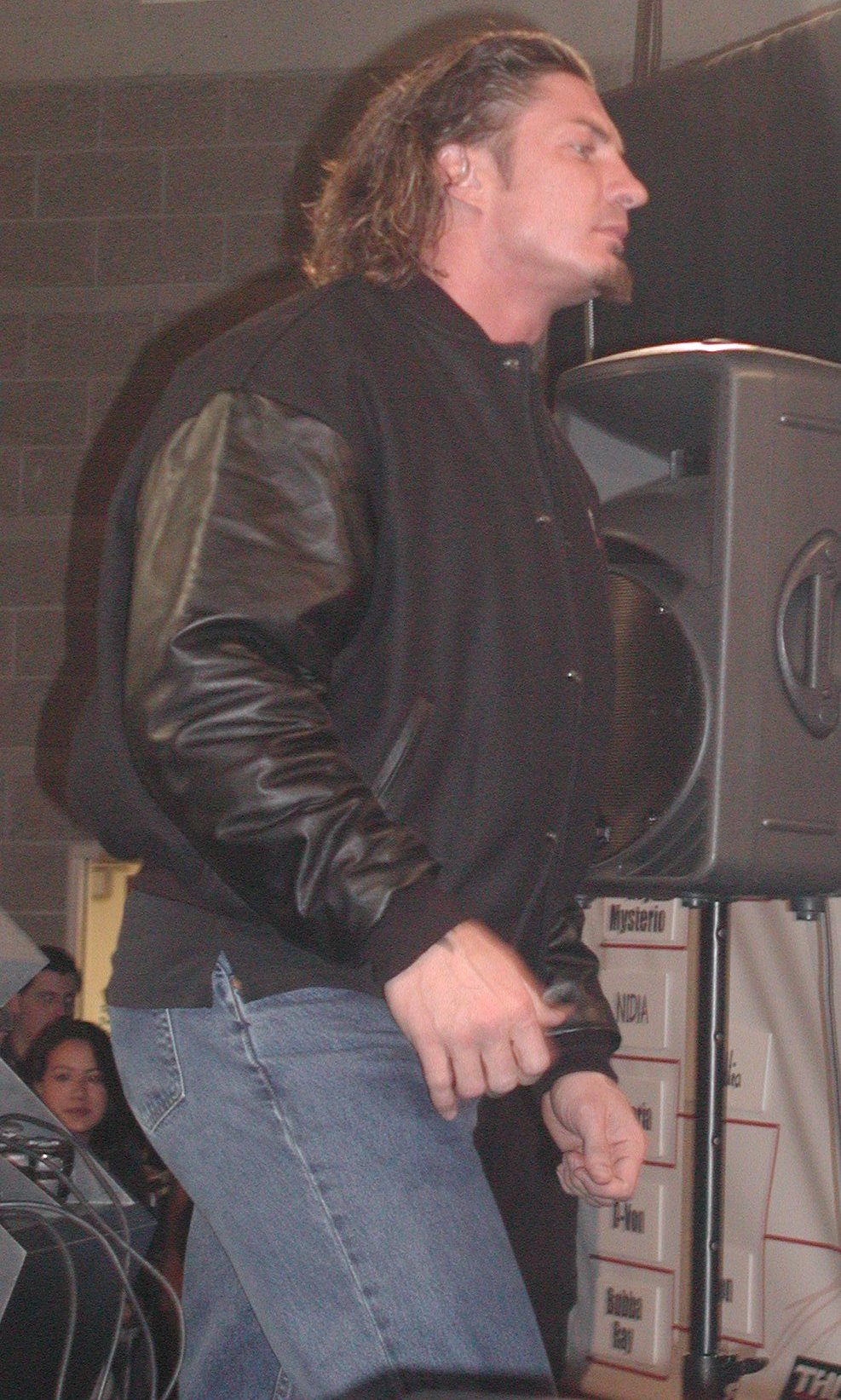
- O'Haire in 2003

Personal information
- Born: Sean Christopher Haire; February 25, 1971 Atlanta, Georgia, U.S.
- Died: September 8, 2014 (aged 43) Spartanburg, South Carolina, U.S.
- Cause of death: Suicide by hanging
- Spouse: Joy Haire (m. 2005; div. 2007)

Professional wrestling career
- Ring name: Sean O'Haire
- Billed height: 6 ft 6 in (198 cm)
- Billed weight: 270 lb (122 kg)
- Billed from: Hilton Head, South Carolina
- Trained by: WCW Power Plant
- Debut: May 25, 2000
- Retired: June 28, 2006

Sean Christopher Haire (February 25, 1971 – September 8, 2014) was an American professional wrestler, mixed martial artist and kickboxer, better known by his ring name Sean O'Haire.

Haire was best known for his appearances with the professional wrestling promotions World Championship Wrestling, the World Wrestling Federation/World Wrestling Entertainment on its SmackDown brand and New Japan Pro-Wrestling in the early to mid-2000s. A three time WCW World Tag Team Champion, O'Haire was named "Rookie of the Year" by the Wrestling Observer in 2000.

Upon retiring from professional wrestling in 2006, Haire competed in mixed martial arts and kickboxing before becoming a hair stylist.

== Early life ==
Haire was born in Atlanta, Georgia, but was raised primarily in Hilton Head Island, South Carolina. Prior to becoming a wrestler, Haire practiced martial arts for many years and won multiple Toughman Contests. He also was part-owner of a Hilton Head fitness center, and attended Hargrave Military Academy in Chatham, Virginia.

== Professional wrestling career ==
=== World Championship Wrestling (2000–2001) ===
After completing his training in the WCW Power Plant, World Championship Wrestling's training school, Haire, using the ring name Sean O'Haire, began making appearances on second-tier WCW television shows such as Worldwide and Saturday Night. Haire made his live television debut on the June 26, 2000 episode of Nitro teaming with his fellow Power Plant graduate Mark Jindrak as they defeated the Filthy Animals (Rey Mysterio Jr. and Juventud Guerrera).

On the July 3 episode of Nitro, O'Haire and Jindrak faced the Misfits in Action (General Hugh G. Rection and Corporal Cajun) to determine the number one contenders for the WCW World Tag Team Championship, but were defeated. Despite this, O'Haire and Jindrak faced then-World Tag Team Champions KroniK and Vampiro and The Great Muta in a three-way match for the championship, but were unsuccessful in winning the title. In August, O'Haire and Jindrak helped form the Natural Born Thrillers with Mike Sanders, Shawn Stasiak, Chuck Palumbo, Johnny "The Bull" Stamboli, and Reno. They were briefly mentored by Kevin Nash. In September, O'Haire and Jindrak won the World Tag Team Championship for the first time.

O'Haire and Jindrak won the title once more before splitting when O'Haire and Jindrak participated in a tag team battle royal with the Natural Born Thrillers teammates Stasiak and Palumbo. After the conclusion of the match, Sanders declared both teams victorious and said that the teams should trade partners. As a result, O'Haire formed a new tag team with Palumbo, while the second team consisted of Jindrak and Stasiak.

Palumbo and O'Haire defeated The Insiders (Diamond Dallas Page and Nash) in January 2001. A short time later, the Natural Born Thrillers broke up when Stasiak and Jindrak became jealous of Palumbo and O'Haire's success. The teams met at SuperBrawl Revenge on February 18 for the tag team gold. Palumbo and O'Haire retained their titles. O'Haire and Palumbo next feuded with Totally Buffed (Buff Bagwell and Lex Luger) and defeated them at Greed on March 18 to retain the Tag Team Championship.

Over the following two weeks, O'Haire and Palumbo feuded with Team Canada (Lance Storm and Mike Awesome), defeating them on the final episode of Nitro on March 26. WCW was purchased by the WWF, and both O'Haire and Palumbo's contracts were picked up.

=== World Wrestling Federation/Entertainment (2001–2004) ===
==== The Alliance and developmental territories (2001–2002) ====
O'Haire and Palumbo made their WWF debuts on the June 28, 2001, episode of SmackDown! as part of The Alliance, attacking the Hardy Boyz. O'Haire and Palumbo started feuding with the WWF Tag Team Champions the Acolytes Protection Agency in the following weeks, which ended at Invasion on July 22 when the APA defeated O'Haire and Palumbo in a non-title match. Subsequently, O'Haire and Palumbo defeated the Hardy Boyz on the August 2, 2001 edition of SmackDown!.

O'Haire and Palumbo next dropped the WCW Tag Team Championship to the Brothers of Destruction (The Undertaker and Kane) on the August 9 episode of SmackDown! and lost their rematch for the championship in a cage match the following week on Raw. O'Haire and Palumbo's last televised match together was on the August 26 edition of Heat defeating The Holly Cousins (Hardcore Holly and Crash Holly).

Palumbo was thrown out of The Alliance in late October 2001 and joined the WWF in November. Also in September, O'Haire was sent to Ohio Valley Wrestling (OVW) for seasoning where he joined Kenny Bolin's "Bolin Services". O'Haire returned to WWE on the June 30, 2002 edition of Heat, defeating Justin Credible. He made a few more appearances on Heat, in dark matches and at house shows throughout the rest of 2002. He also made an appearance on the December 23 episode of Raw, in a promo where he played a mall Santa Claus character who tells the kids there’s no Santa, and then reveals himself to be "Big Sean O’Haire."

==== SmackDown! (2003–2004) ====
In January 2003, vignettes started to appear on WWE programming showing O'Haire in his new gimmick: that of an amoral libertine who urged people to commit adultery, break the law, not pay taxes, and not go to church, among other things. He ended each vignette with the line "I'm not telling you anything you don't already know." In 2003, O'Haire returned to the main SmackDown! roster, telling various superstars to perform indecent acts, which included persuading Spanky to streak through the arena and Dawn Marie to flash the audience.

O'Haire's persona included a long black trench coat he wore to the ring and his obsession with spiders, including fairly new tattoos with black flames on each wrist and a red spider web shooting out from the flames on his left wrist and a blue spider web on his right wrist. His Titantron video was also inside the body of a spider with a spiderweb in the background. He quickly came under the tutelage of wrestling legend, Roddy Piper in April 2003. His new persona was abandoned but he held victories over major stars Rikishi, Funaki, Mr. America by count out, Chris Benoit, and Eddie Guerrero. He would lose in-house show to Rikishi, Chris Benoit, Billy Gunn, Bill Demott, John Cena, Orlando Jordan and Rhyno. WWE officially released Piper from his contract on June 26, 2003, right after O'Haire and Piper made their last appearance together on SmackDown!. O'Haire continued on his own mainly on Velocity. In late November 2003, he was involved in a motorcycle accident that required stitches and kept him out of action for the next month or so. When he recovered in February, he was sent back to OVW and had a few matches against John Cena in house shows before being released from his contract on April 3, 2004.

=== New Japan Pro-Wrestling, and later career (2004–2006) ===
Haire went to work for New Japan Pro-Wrestling (NJPW) following his WWE release, still using the ring name Sean O'Haire. He wrestled Hiroshi Tanahashi at NJPW Nexess on May 3, 2004, in a losing effort. On July 17, 2004, O'Haire and Piper re-united at a Ballpark Brawl show where Haire was Piper's hand-picked wrestler to face Jimmy Hart's hand-picked wrestler Abyss. O'Haire defeated Abyss by disqualification. Haire then went on to work for California based independent promotion Ultimate Pro Wrestling.

O'Haire reunited with Chuck Palumbo on February 23, 2005, at UPW's Homecoming Havoc in which they were defeated by Tom Howard and the Predator. O'Haire retired from professional wrestling soon after in order to focus on mixed martial arts.

O'Haire's last match was on March 28, 2006, when he returned to WWE for a one night appearance on WWE Velocity losing to Scotty 2 Hotty in a dark match.

== Kickboxing ==
Haire signed with Japanese based kickboxing promotion K-1 in 2004. He made his K-1 debut on December 31, 2004 with a second-round knockout loss to Musashi. Haire then went on to compete in two world grand prix tournaments held in Las Vegas, where he was defeated by Gary Goodridge (2005) and Chalid Arrab (2006). Not long after his first K-1 bout he was allegedly slated for a fight against Rick Cheek but his record was brought into question; K-1 reportedly claimed his record was 10–1 in kickboxing & 8–0 in MMA, where only his K-1 bout vs Musashi & his MMA bout against Shungo Oyama could be found.

== Mixed martial arts ==
Haire made his professional mixed martial arts debut in September 2004 with a first round submission win over Tony Towers. In November 2004, Haire faced Pride FC veteran Shungo Oyama at K-1 Fighting Network Rumble on the Rock 2004 where he was victorious via first round technical knockout. Haire's next bout came against 1996 Olympic judo silver medalist Kim Min-soo and was defeated via first round submission. On October 21, 2006, Haire, replacing Mark Hunt, fought Eric "Butterbean" Esch at Pride 32 in Las Vegas. He lost the fight via knockout early in the first round.

On August 17, 2007, Haire was scheduled to fight Mark Kerr at the Mohegan Sun Arena for the Global Fighting Championships promotion but the entire card was canceled after four of the eight scheduled bouts fell through. No explanation was given at that time, regarding the cancellation, only a guarantee of a full refund. It was revealed by GFC representative Joel Parker that half of the night's fights were called off, prompting the decision to nix the card rather than put on a lackluster event. Parker revealed that several fighters were disqualified for either failing to meet their contracted weight or for medical reasons. Kerr and Edwin Dewees were pulled from the card by the overseeing athletic commission for missing weight. According to commission doctors, Kerr registered an unhealthy blood pressure reading the day prior. Kerr was set to fight Haire.

In 2007, Haire took part in Champions Quest Fighting Challenge. He was successful in his first fight on September 29, against Darrell Wood, and beat Frankie Parkman on December 7. However, he never fought again after December 2007. Haire defeated Tony Towers with a Guillotine Choke in the first round. Haire had many MMA fights on smaller shows not listed by the major MMA fight databases.

== Personal life ==
Haire married a woman named Joy Elizabeth in Maui, Hawaii, on May 15, 2005. Approximately a year and a half later, he announced their divorce during a radio interview with SquaredCircleRadio.

Haire was involved in an altercation where he was jumped outside of a bar in Hilton Head, South Carolina, on March 30, 2007, in which he sustained fractures to his face and skull, including his orbital bone. As a result of the fight, the vision in his left eye was impaired. Although Haire claimed that he was going to the aid of a friend, witnesses asserted that Haire tried to instigate a fight with one of his alleged assailants, Juan Brantley. Brantley had filed a complaint with police on March 17, in which he stated that Haire had attempted to start a fight with him at another bar.

=== Arrests ===
In 1992, Haire was arrested in Hilton Head Island and charged with assault.

In June 2004, Haire was arrested and charged with multiple counts of assault after a brawl at a Hilton Head night club, in which he was accused of striking two women. He was later convicted of one count of assault in 2006.

On April 24, 2007, Haire was charged with aggravated assault and battery for a fight at a bar weeks prior. The charge was later dismissed.

On September 6, 2009, Haire was arrested in Chatham County, Georgia, for allegedly assaulting his then girlfriend. He was charged with domestic battery and criminal trespassing before being released on $4,600 bail.

On November 23, 2011, Haire was again arrested in Chatham County, Georgia and charged with simple battery. He was later released on $1,850 bail.

=== Death ===
On the morning of September 9, 2014, Haire's father found him dead, hanging from a bedpost in his bedroom in the Spartanburg, South Carolina home they shared. He was 43 years old. It was determined by the Spartanburg County coroner's office that Haire committed suicide the night prior. Haire's death was announced to the public via Twitter by former WCW wrestler and personal friend of Haire's Scotty Riggs. Haire reportedly battled depression and substance addiction for many years. It was reported that Haire had attended WWE sponsored rehab six times in the six years preceding his death.

== Championships and accomplishments ==
- Victory Championship Wrestling
  - VCW Hall of Fame (Class of 2018)
- World Championship Wrestling
  - WCW World Tag Team Championship (3 times) – with Mark Jindrak (2 times) and Chuck Palumbo (1 time)
- Wrestling Observer Newsletter
  - Rookie of the Year (2000)

== Kickboxing record ==
Date	Result	Record	Opponent	Event	Method	Round	Time
2006-08-12	Loss	0–4	(United States) Justice Smith	K-1 World Grand Prix 2006 in Las Vegas II, US	KO	2	
2006-04-29	Loss	0–3	(Germany) Chalid Arrab	K-1 World Grand Prix 2006 in Las Vegas, US	KO (Right Uppercut)	1	0:23
2005-04-30	Loss	0–2	(Canada) Gary Goodridge	K-1 World Grand Prix 2005 in Las Vegas, US	KO (Right Uppercut)	1	1:56
2004-12-31	Loss	0–1	(Japan) Musashi	K-1 PREMIUM 2004 Dynamite!!, Japan	KO	2	0:44

== Mixed martial arts record ==
Professional record breakdown
6 matches	4 wins	2 losses
By knockout	3	1
By submission	1	1
By decision	0	0

Res.	Record	Opponent	Method	Event	Date	Round	Time	Location	Notes
Win	4–2	Frankie Parkman	KO (punch)	Champions Quest – Fighting Challenge	December 7, 2007	1	1:04	Savannah, Georgia, United States	
Win	3–2	Darrell Wood	KO (punches)	Champions Quest – Fighting Challenge	September 29, 2007	1	2:07	Savannah, Georgia, United States	
Loss	2–2	Eric Esch	KO (punches)	Pride 32	October 21, 2006	1	0:29	Las Vegas, Nevada, United States	
Loss	2–1	Kim Min-soo	Submission (guillotine choke)	Hero's 2005 in Seoul	November 5, 2005	1	4:46	Seoul, South Korea	
Win	2–0	Shungo Oyama	TKO (punches)	Rumble on the Rock 6	November 20, 2004	1	0:31	Honolulu, Hawaii, United States	
Win	1–0	Tony Towers	Submission (guillotine choke)	Venom - First Strike	September 18, 2004	1	1:42	Huntington Beach, California, United States	

== See also ==
- List of premature professional wrestling deaths
