= Pride 32 =

Pride FC MMA event in 2006

- The poster for Pride 32
- Promotion: Pride Fighting Championships
- Date: October 21, 2006
- Venue: Thomas & Mack Center
- City: Paradise, Nevada, USA
- Attendance: 11,727 (8,079 paid)
- Total gate: $2,056,044
- Buyrate: 40,000

Event chronology
Pride: Final Conflict Absolute	Pride 32	Pride: Bushido 13

Pride 32: The Real Deal was a mixed martial arts event and was held by the Pride Fighting Championships. The event took place on October 21, 2006, at the Thomas & Mack Center in Las Vegas, Nevada.

== Background ==
This was the first Pride event to be held outside Japan. Since the event took place in Nevada, Pride had to modify its rules to follow Nevada's version of the Unified Rules of Mixed Martial Arts for this event. Pride followed Nevada's MMA rules for the most part, however they prohibited elbows to the head. Matches were three rounds of five minutes each, and if a match went the distance, it would be judged by Nevada's 10-point must system with Nevada State Athletic Commission (NSAC) judges, which was different from Pride's own judging criteria.

Marvin Eastman was scheduled to face Kazuhiro Nakamura, but a contract dispute with the World Fighting Alliance prevented Eastman from taking part. Eastman was replaced by Travis Galbraith.

Mark Hunt was originally announced to be fighting Eric Esch in an MMA match. But the NSAC would not allow Hunt to fight Esch as they argued that Hunt’s wins over Wanderlei Silva and Mirko Filipovic gave him an unfair mat advantage. Pride had stated that "visa issues" were preventing Hunt from competing in the bout, but it was later confirmed that Hunt could not compete due to the NSAC's ruling. Hunt was replaced by Sean O'Haire.

Wanderlei Silva was also expected to fight at the event, but was barred by the NSAC as Silva had been knocked out at Pride Final Conflict Absolute on September 10, 41 days prior (knockout losses require a minimum 60 day suspension in Nevada).

Mirko "Cro Cop" Filipović had also been thought to fight at this event, as he was seen in the earlier Pride 32 promotional poster. However, he was unfit to fight as he had injured his foot in a previous match in an earlier Pride event.

The fight between Phil Baroni and Yosuke Nishijima was ruled a submission victory, though Nishijima did not tap out. The referee in charge ended the fight in order to protect Nishijima from injury. The match was therefore ruled a Technical Submission.

After the event, Vitor Belfort and Pawel Nastula both tested positive for banned substances; Nastula for nandrolone and Belfort for 4-hydroxytestosterone. Kevin Randleman also provided a dubious urine sample, of which was stated "It was either allegedly non-human urine or urine from a dead human being," by the NSAC.

The Pay-per-view price was $39.95. Tickets sold from $50 to $700. Regular Pride commentators Mauro Ranallo and Frank Trigg were joined on the call by Craig Minervini for the PPV broadcast. Ring announcing duties were split between Pride's usual English-language ring announcer Lenne Hardt and Japanese-language head ring announcer Kei Grant, who is also fluent in English.

== Results ==
Main card
Weight class				Method	Round	Time	Notes
Heavyweight	Fedor Emelianenko	def.	Mark Coleman	Submission (armbar)	2	1:15	(Note: Non-title bout.)
Light Heavyweight	Maurício Rua	def.	Kevin Randleman	Submission (kneebar)	1	2:35	(Note: Randleman failed post-fight drug test.)
Heavyweight	Josh Barnett	def.	Pawel Nastula	Submission (toe hold)	2	3:04	(Note: Nastula failed post-fight drug test.)
Heavyweight	Eric Esch	def.	Sean O'Haire	KO (punches)	1	0:29
Light Heavyweight	Dan Henderson	def.	Vitor Belfort	Decision (unanimous) (30–27, 30–27, 30–24)	3	5:00	(Note: Belfort failed post-fight drug test.)
Catchweight (195lb)	Phil Baroni	def.	Yosuke Nishijima	Technical Submission (kimura)	1	3:20
Light Heavyweight	Kazuhiro Nakamura	def.	Travis Galbraith	TKO (punches)	2	1:16
Middleweight	Robbie Lawler	def.	Joey Villasenor	KO (flying knee)	1	0:22

== See also ==
- Pride Fighting Championships
- List of Pride Fighting Championships champions
- List of Pride FC events
- 2006 in Pride FC
