= Yuki Sasaki (mixed martial artist) =

Japanese martial artist

Yuki Sasaki 佐々木有生
- Born: September 12, 1976 (age 50); Date, Fukushima, Japan
- Nationality: Japanese
- Height: 6 ft 0 in (1.83 m)
- Weight: 170 lb (77 kg; 12 st)
- Division: Middleweight; Welterweight
- Style: Karate, Brazilian jiu-jitsu, Muay thai, Shootfighting,
- Stance: Orthodox
- Fighting out of: Tokyo, Japan
- Team: Grabaka
- Rank: black belt in Karate black belt in Brazilian Jiu-Jitsu; A-Class Shootist
- Years active: 1998–present

Mixed martial arts record
- Total: 49
- Wins: 25
- By knockout: 2
- By submission: 15
- By decision: 8
- Losses: 22
- By knockout: 5
- By submission: 4
- By decision: 13
- Draws: 2

Other information
- Mixed martial arts record from Sherdog

Yuki Sasaki (佐々木 有生, Sasaki Yūki; born September 12, 1976) is a Japanese professional mixed martial artist that has fought for Shooto, DEEP, World Victory Road, Pancrase and the UFC.

== Mixed martial arts ==
Sasaki has primarily competed in the Shooto and Pancrase organizations, and holds notable wins over veterans Paul Taylor, Yuya Shirai, Keiichiro Yamamiya, Ryuta Sakurai, Jason DeLucia and Yuki Kondo. Though his background is in karate, Sasaki has relied on his jiu-jitsu skills, as most of his wins have been via armbar or triangle.

== Championships and accomplishments ==
- Sengoku
  - 2008 Sengoku Middleweight Grand Prix Semifinalist

== Mixed martial arts record ==
Professional record breakdown
49 matches	25 wins	22 losses
By knockout	2	5
By submission	15	4
By decision	8	13
Draws	2	

Res.	Record	Opponent	Method	Event	Date	Round	Time	Location	Notes
Loss	25–22–2	Glenn Sparv	TKO	AFC 18: Australian Fighting Championship 18	April 14, 2017	1	N/A	Tokyo, Japan	
Loss	25–21–2	Tahar Hadbi	Decision (unanimous)	AOW: Art of War 18	July 30, 2016	2	5:00	Tokyo, Japan	
Win	25–20–2	Hidenobu Koike	Submission (rear naked choke)	DEEP: Cage Impact 2015	August 29, 2015	1	4:40	Tokyo, Japan	
Win	24–20–2	Ryul Kim	Decision (unanimous)	Grabaka Live! 3	October 27, 2013	3	5:00	Tokyo, Japan	
Draw	23–20–2	Hiromitsu Kanehara	Draw (unanimous)	Grabaka Live! 2	October 27, 2012	3	5:00	Tokyo, Japan	
Loss	23–20–1	Keita Nakamura	Decision (unanimous)	Shooto: 5th Round	May 18, 2012	3	5:00	Tokyo, Japan	
Win	23–19–1	Hidetaka Monma	Decision (unanimous)	Grabaka Live: 1st Cage Attack	October 15, 2011	3	5:00	Tokyo, Japan	Welterweight debut.
Loss	22–19–1	Mamed Khalidov	TKO (punches)	World Victory Road Presents: Soul of Fight	December 30, 2010	1	2:22	Tokyo, Japan	
Loss	22–18–1	Paulo Filho	Decision (unanimous)	Bitetti Combat 8: 100 Years of Corinthians	December 4, 2010	3	5:00	São Paulo, Brazil	
Loss	22–17–1	Xavier Lucas	KO (punch)	XMMA: Xtreme MMA 3	November 5, 2010	5	N/A	Sydney, New South Wales, Australia	
Loss	22–16–1	Sean Salmon	Decision (unanimous)	FF 26: Fight Festival 26	October 17, 2009	1	1:46	Helsinki, Finland	
Loss	22–15–1	Kazuhiro Nakamura	Decision (unanimous)	World Victory Road Presents: Sengoku 6	November 1, 2008	1	1:46	Saitama, Saitama, Japan	2008 Sengoku Middleweight Grand Prix Semifinals.
Win	22–14–1	Yuki Kondo	Submission (rear-naked choke)	World Victory Road Presents: Sengoku 5	September 28, 2008	2	1:08	Tokyo, Japan	2008 Sengoku Middleweight Grand Prix First Round.
Loss	21–14–1	Jorge Santiago	Submission (armbar)	World Victory Road Presents: Sengoku 2	May 18, 2008	3	2:10	Tokyo, Japan	
Win	21–13–1	Bo Guk So	Submission (armbar)	DEEP: Glove	July 26, 2007	1	1:46	Tokyo, Japan	
Loss	20–13–1	Dean Lister	Decision (unanimous)	UFC Fight Night 6	August 17, 2006	3	5:00	Las Vegas, Nevada, United States	
Win	20–12–1	Paul Taylor	Submission (armbar)	P & G: Pain and Glory 2006	May 6, 2006	1	N/A	Birmingham, England	
Loss	19–12–1	Leonardo Lucio Nascimento	Submission (anaconda choke)	WCFC: No Guts No Glory	March 18, 2006	1	2:23	Manchester, England	
Win	19–11–1	Rodney Glunder	Submission (armbar)	WCFC: No Guts No Glory	March 18, 2006	1	4:40	Manchester, England	
Win	18–11–1	Takanori Kuno	TKO (punches)	DEEP: 22 Impact	December 2, 2005	1	2:20	Tokyo, Japan	
Loss	17–11–1	Gustavo Machado	Decision (majority)	Pancrase: Spiral 2	March 6, 2005	3	5:00	Yokohama, Kanagawa, Japan	
Win	17–10–1	Yuya Shirai	Decision (unanimous)	Pancrase: Brave 11	November 26, 2004	3	5:00	Tokyo, Japan	
Win	16–10–1	Buck Meredith	Submission (triangle choke)	Pancrase: Brave 8	September 24, 2004	2	3:13	Tokyo, Japan	
Loss	15–10–1	Fabio Leopoldo	Decision (majority)	Pancrase: 2004 Neo-Blood Tournament Semifinals	July 25, 2004	3	5:00	Tokyo, Japan	
Win	15–9–1	Yukiya Naito	Decision (unanimous)	Pancrase: Brave 5	May 28, 2004	3	5:00	Tokyo, Japan	
Loss	14–9–1	David Terrell	KO (punch)	Pancrase: Hybrid 11	December 21, 2003	2	0:15	Tokyo, Japan	
Win	14–8–1	Heath Sims	Decision (unanimous)	Pancrase: 10th Anniversary Show	August 31, 2003	3	5:00	Tokyo, Japan	
Loss	13–8–1	Daisuke Watanabe	KO (punch)	Pancrase: Hybrid 7	June 22, 2003	1	4:18	Tokyo, Japan	
Loss	13–7–1	Ricardo Almeida	Decision (unanimous)	Pancrase: Hybrid 4	April 12, 2003	3	5:00	Tokyo, Japan	
Loss	13–6–1	Rodrigo Gracie	Decision (unanimous)	PRIDE 24	December 23, 2002	3	5:00	Fukuoka Prefecture, Japan	
Loss	13–5–1	Ikuhisa Minowa	Decision (majority)	Pancrase: Spirit 8	November 30, 2002	3	5:00	Yokohama, Kanagawa, Japan	
Win	13–4–1	Alex Stiebling	Decision (unanimous)	Pancrase: 2002 Anniversary Show	September 29, 2002	3	5:00	Yokohama, Kanagawa, Japan	
Win	12–4–1	John Glover	Submission (armbar)	Pancrase: Spirit 5	May 28, 2002	2	1:19	Tokyo, Japan	
Draw	11–4–1	Gustavo Machado	Draw	DEEP: 4th Impact	March 30, 2002	3	5:00	Nagoya, Aichi, Japan	
Win	11–4	Keiichiro Yamamiya	Submission (armbar)	Pancrase: Spirit 1	January 27, 2002	1	4:29	Tokyo, Japan	
Win	10–4	Osami Shibuya	Submission (triangle armbar)	Pancrase: Proof 7	December 1, 2001	3	3:42	Yokohama, Kanagawa, Japan	
Win	9–4	Daisuke Ishii	Submission (armbar)	Pancrase: Proof 6	October 30, 2001	1	3:01	Tokyo, Japan	
Win	8–4	Jason DeLucia	Submission (armbar)	Pancrase: 2001 Neo-Blood Tournament Opening Round	July 29, 2001	2	3:05	Tokyo, Japan	
Loss	7–4	Ikuhisa Minowa	Submission (toe hold)	Pancrase: Proof 3	May 13, 2001	3	0:25	Tokyo, Japan	
Win	7–3	Daisuke Watanabe	Submission (armbar)	Pancrase: Proof 1	February 4, 2001	1	4:12	Tokyo, Japan	
Loss	6–3	Martijn de Jong	Submission (triangle choke)	Shooto: R.E.A.D. 12	November 12, 2000	1	0:40	Tokyo, Japan	
Loss	6–2	Masanori Suda	Decision (unanimous)	Shooto: R.E.A.D. 3	April 2, 2000	3	5:00	Osaka, Japan	
Win	6–1	Ronald Jhun	Submission (triangle/armbar)	Shooto: R.E.A.D. 1	January 14, 2000	3	2:20	Tokyo, Japan	
Loss	5–1	Larry Papadopoulos	Decision (unanimous)	Shooto: Renaxis 2	July 16, 1999	3	5:00	Tokyo, Japan	
Win	5–0	Ryuta Sakurai	Submission (heel hook)	Shooto: Shooter's Passion	May 27, 1999	1	2:00	Tokyo, Japan	
Win	4–0	Kazuhiro Kusayanagi	TKO (punches)	Shooto: Las Grandes Viajes 6	November 27, 1998	1	0:46	Tokyo, Japan	
Win	3–0	Nobuhiro Tsurumaki	Decision (unanimous)	Shooto: Shooter's Dream	September 18, 1998	2	5:00	Tokyo, Japan	
Win	2–0	Izuru Takeuchi	Decision (unanimous)	Shooto: Gig '98 2nd	July 18, 1998	2	5:00	Tokyo, Japan	
Win	1–0	Yasushi Warita	Submission (heel hook)	Shooto: Gig '98 1st	April 10, 1998	1	1:19	Tokyo, Japan	

== See also ==
- List of male mixed martial artists
