= Akihiro Gono =

Japanese martial artist (born 1974)

- Born: October 7, 1974 (age 52); Higashikurume, Tokyo, Japan
- Other names: "The Magic Man", "DJ GOZMA", "The Japanese Sensation", "Impregnable Big Mouth"
- Nationality: Japanese
- Height: 5 ft 9 in (1.75 m)
- Weight: 170 lb (77 kg; 12 st)
- Division: Lightweight; Welterweight; Middleweight; Light Heavyweight; Heavyweight
- Style: Kickboxing, Submission Wrestling, Karate, Sambo
- Stance: Orthodox
- Fighting out of: Higashikurume, Tokyo, Japan
- Team: Team Grabaka; OxyGym Fight Team; Haleo Top Team
- Years active: 1994-2012; 2013-present

Kickboxing record
- Total: 12
- Wins: 5
- By knockout: 1
- Losses: 7
- By knockout: 3

Mixed martial arts record
- Total: 70
- Wins: 38
- By knockout: 7
- By submission: 9
- By decision: 21
- By disqualification: 1
- Losses: 24
- By knockout: 8
- By submission: 4
- By decision: 12
- Draws: 8

Other information
- Mixed martial arts record from Sherdog
- Last updated on: November 17, 2012

Akihiro Gono (Japanese: 郷野聡寛, Gōno Akihiro) (born October 7, 1974) is a Japanese mixed martial artist currently competing in the Lightweight division. A professional competitor since 1994, he is best known for his clever and deceptive fighting style, and for his flashy ring entrances. Gono has competed for the UFC, PRIDE Fighting Championships, Pancrase, the World Series of Fighting, DEEP, World Victory Road, Shooto, Bellator, and also participated in the Dynamite!! 2009 event.

== Mixed martial arts career ==
=== Shooto and Pancrase ===
Akihiro Gono began fighting mixed martial arts in 1994, competing in the Lumax Cup tournaments as a Sambo and Karate representative. He got a win over Kazunari Murakami via head kick, but lost to him in their rematch the next year. Gono originally debuted in Fighting Network Rings's undercard, but he moved to Shooto after the Lumax Cup. His run there was uneventful, although he drew Jutaro Nakao and led Matt Hughes to a decision in his first years. 2000 would be his breakout year, winning against veteran Masanori Suda, against Ivan Salaverry via spinning kick and drawing with Murilo "Ninja" Rua.

Gono left Shooto for Pancrase in 2001 and became a member of Sanae Kikuta's Grabaka team. He again showed improvement, beating twice renowned Keiichiro Yamamiya and Chris Haseman and having a spirited match with Yuki Kondo, as well as a draw with Chael Sonnen. He stopped fighting for Pancrase in 2005 in order to focus in PRIDE Fighting Championships, though still as a Grabaka member.

=== PRIDE Fighting Championships ===
He began fighting in PRIDE Bushido with Bushido 2 in 2004, facing Murilo's brother Maurício "Shogun" Rua. Gono avoided Rua's first flurries with an elusive style, throwing Rua to the mat twice, but he was knocked out via punches and kicks when Rua finally caught him. However, Akihiro recovered from his defeat at his next event, facing Gracie family member Rodrigo Gracie. The match was heated, as Rodrigo had submitted Gono's fellow shooter Hayato Sakurai in his debut while Gono had defeated Cesar Gracie's student Tim McKenzie back in Pancrase. During the match, Gono traded strikes with Gracie and was taken down and pressed at the first round, but he came back at the second, stopping takedowns and capitalizing with strikes, including a head stomp which bloodied Gracie.

In September 2005, Akihiro took part in the PRIDE Welterweight Grand Prix. He became controversial for criticizing Ryo Chonan and Masanori Suda's performances and right to fight in the tournament, somewhat they called off on him back. At the first round, Gono won an upset over Daniel Acacio, showing one more time his ability to avoid damage in stand-up and counterattack. The same night, at the second round, he faced Dan Henderson, suffering an accidental headbutt before losing the match by KO.

In 2006, Gono returned to PRIDE, this time playing a new character, DJ Gozma, a parody of Japanese musician DJ OZMA. His entrances involved Gono wearing a vintage suit, including shoes and an orange wig, and accompanied by oddly-dressed male dancers while the song age♂age♂EVERY☆Night by DJ OZMA played in the background. Also, when the fighters were introduced in the ring, Gono would drop his suit's pants to reveal zebra stripped fighting briefs.

He participated in the next edition of the Welterweight Grand Prix, defeating Cuban Olympic judoka Hector Lombard on the first round. Characteristically, Gono avoided the damage from Lombard's aggressive initial combinations and countered him with hard punches, keeping his hands unorthodoxly low and throwing spinning backfists. His next round match would be against Gegard Mousasi, which he won again, deflecting his attacks and working an armbar for the tap out. However, Gono was eliminated at the semifinals by Denis Kang.

Gono's last apparition in Pride was at Shockwave 2006, fighting a revenge match with Yuki Kondo which came from their Pancrase days. Despite injuring his hand earlier in the match, Gono won the match by unanimous decision.

=== Ultimate Fighting Championship ===
Gono defeated Tamdan McCrory at UFC 78, by submission due to an Armbar at 3:19 of the second round. It was reported (first by Dave Meltzer) that he came out to his usual entrance with his DJ GOZMA persona.

Gono then took on Dan Hardy at UFC 89, but suffered defeat via split decision. Gono was left swollen and bloodied by several of Hardy's left hooks. Gono rocked Hardy on more than one occasion. In the third round Gono pushed Hardy to the canvas, and subsequently landed an illegal knee to the face of the downed fighter. This caused the fight to be stopped for a short period. Hardy recovered and went on to win the split decision. The judges saw the bout 29-28 (twice) for Hardy, and 29-28 for Gono.

Gono lost to Jon Fitch in a preliminary bout at UFC 94: St. Pierre vs. Penn 2. Following his loss to Jon Fitch, Gono was released from the UFC. He left the company with a 1-2 record.

=== Sengoku ===
After being released by the Ultimate Fighting Championship, Gono fought Dan Hornbuckle at World Victory Road Presents: Sengoku 9 losing via head kick knockout in the third round.

Gono then fought Yoon Young Kim at World Victory Road Presents: Sengoku 11 winning the fight via unanimous decision.

Gono fought fellow PRIDE veteran Hayato Sakurai at Dynamite!! 2009 winning the fight via armbar, late in the second round.

Gono fought Diego Gonzalez at World Victory Road Presents: Sengoku Raiden Championships 12 winning the fight via unanimous decision.

Gono made his Lightweight debut against Kyokushin kaikan expert Jadamba Narantungalag at World Victory Road Presents: Sengoku Raiden Championships 14 on August 22, 2010. He lost the fight via unanimous decision.

=== ONE Fighting Championship ===
Gono was photographed in the VIP area at ONE Fighting Championship: Champion vs. Champion leading to multiple websites speculating that he was about to sign a multi-fight deal with ONE Fighting Championship.

=== Bellator and first retirement ===
After losing to Michael Chandler at Bellator 67 on May 4, 2012, Gono announced his first retirement from MMA.

=== Return to MMA ===
Just under a year after he announced his retirement, Gono returned to MMA when he faced Taisuke Okuno at DEEP: 62nd Impact on April 26, 2013. He lost the fight by KO. Gono then fought to a draw against Yuki Okano at DEEP – Cage Impact 2013 on November 24, 2013.

=== Training and fighting in Brazil ===
After training for months in Brazil at Oxygym in the city of Gramado, Gono back to action facing Brazilian prospect Eduardo Garvon at The Hill Fighters 1 in his Brazilian home-town city of Gramado. Gono had problems in the standup fight against the taller Brazilian, but seconds away for the end of the fight, Gono submitted Garvon via technical submission (arm-triangle choke).

He won his second fight in Brazil at The Hill Fighters 2 against André de Jesus via split decision.

== Kickboxing ==
He lost to Bovy Sor Udomson via TKO (referee stoppage) in round one at Shootboxing 2012: Act 4 on September 17, 2012, in Tokyo, Japan, failing to qualify for the 2012 S-Cup.

He lost to Satoru Suzuki by TKO at the end of round one in a reserve bout at the Shoot Boxing World Tournament 2012 in Tokyo, Japan on November 17, 2012.

== Mixed martial arts record ==
Professional record breakdown
70 matches	38 wins	24 losses
By knockout	7	8
By submission	9	4
By decision	21	12
By disqualification	1	0
Draws	8	

Res.	Record	Opponent	Method	Event	Date	Round	Time	Location	Notes
Win	38–24–8	Yuki Kondo	Decision (unanimous)	DEEP 127 Impact	September 15, 2025	2	5:00	Tokyo, Japan	Catchweight (161 lb) bout.
Win	37–24–8	Tetsuya Izuchi	Decision (unanimous)	GLEAT ver.MEGA	August 4, 2023	3	5:00	Tokyo, Japan	Catchweight (161 lb) bout.
Loss	36–24–8	Yuki Kondo	Decision (unanimous)	Pancrase: 305	May 26, 2019	3	3:00	Tokyo, Japan	
Loss	36–23–8	Adriano Balby	Decision (split)	Rebel FC 7: Fight for Honour	April 29, 2018	3	5:00	Shanghai, China	
Win	36–22–8	Kyohei Wakimoto	Decision (split)	Pancrase: 293	February 4, 2018	3	3:00	Tokyo, Japan	Return to Welterweight.
Loss	35–22–8	Akira Okada	Decision (unanimous)	Pancrase: 290	October 8, 2017	3	5:00	Tokyo, Japan	
Loss	35–21–8	Killys Mota	TKO (punches)	Fight 2 Night 2	April 28, 2017	3	1:55	Foz do Iguaçu, Brazil	
Win	35–20–8	Akhmat Akhmedov	Decision (split)	Real Fight Championship 5	June 12, 2016	2	5:00	Tokyo, Japan	
Loss	34–20–8	Miroslav Strbak	KO (punches)	WSOF Global Championship 2	February 7, 2016	2	2:42	Tokyo, Japan	
Win	34–19–8	Andre de Jesus	Decision (split)	THF: The Hill Fighters 2	July 12, 2014	3	5:00	Gramado, Brazil	
Win	33–19–8	Eduardo Garvon	Technical Submission (arm-triangle choke)	THF: The Hill Fighters 1	May 1, 2014	3	4:58	Gramado, Brazil	Return to Lightweight.
Draw	32–19–8	Yuki Okano	Draw (split)	DEEP: Cage Impact 2013	November 24, 2013	3	5:00	Tokyo, Japan	Welterweight bout.
Loss	32–19–7	Taisuke Okuno	KO (punch)	DEEP: 62nd Impact	April 26, 2013	2	2:07	Tokyo, Japan	Welterweight bout.
Loss	32–18–7	Michael Chandler	TKO (punches)	Bellator 67	May 4, 2012	1	0:56	Rama, Ontario, Canada	Announced retirement at the post-fight press conference.
Loss	32–17–7	Daisuke Nakamura	Decision (unanimous)	DEEP – 57th Impact	February 18, 2012	3	5:00	Tokyo, Japan	Welterweight bout.
Loss	32–16–7	Jadamba Narantungalag	Decision (unanimous)	World Victory Road Presents: Sengoku Raiden Championships 14	August 22, 2010	3	5:00	Tokyo, Japan	Lightweight debut.
Win	32–15–7	Diego Gonzalez	Decision (unanimous)	World Victory Road Presents: Sengoku Raiden Championships 12	March 7, 2010	3	5:00	Tokyo, Japan	
Win	31–15–7	Hayato Sakurai	Submission (armbar)	Dynamite!! The Power of Courage 2009	December 31, 2009	2	3:56	Saitama, Saitama, Japan	
Win	30–15–7	Yoon Young Kim	Decision (unanimous)	World Victory Road Presents: Sengoku 11	November 7, 2009	3	5:00	Tokyo, Japan	
Loss	29–15–7	Dan Hornbuckle	KO (head kick)	World Victory Road Presents: Sengoku 9	August 2, 2009	3	2:50	Saitama, Saitama, Japan	
Loss	29–14–7	Jon Fitch	Decision (unanimous)	UFC 94	January 31, 2009	3	5:00	Las Vegas, Nevada, United States	
Loss	29–13–7	Dan Hardy	Decision (split)	UFC 89	October 18, 2008	3	5:00	Birmingham, England	
Win	29–12–7	Tamdan McCrory	Submission (armbar)	UFC 78	November 17, 2007	2	3:19	Newark, United States	Returned to Welterweight; won Submission of the Night honors.
Win	28–12–7	Yuki Kondo	Decision (split)	PRIDE FC: Shockwave 2006	December 31, 2006	2	5:00	Saitama, Japan	
Loss	27–12–7	Denis Kang	Decision (unanimous)	PRIDE: Bushido 13	November 5, 2006	2	5:00	Yokohama, Japan	PRIDE 2006 Welterweight (83 kg) Grand Prix Semifinal.
Win	27–11–7	Gegard Mousasi	Submission (armbar)	PRIDE: Bushido 12	August 26, 2006	2	4:24	Nagoya, Japan	PRIDE 2006 Welterweight (83 kg) Grand Prix Quarterfinal.
Win	26–11–7	Hector Lombard	Decision (unanimous)	PRIDE: Bushido 11	June 4, 2006	2	5:00	Saitama, Japan	PRIDE 2006 Welterweight (83 kg) Grand Prix Opening Round.
Win	25–11–7	Dae Won Kim	Submission (armbar)	PRIDE: Bushido 10	April 2, 2006	1	9:00	Tokyo, Japan	
Loss	24–11–7	Dan Henderson	KO (punch)	PRIDE Bushido 9	September 25, 2005	1	7:58	Tokyo, Japan	PRIDE 2005 Welterweight (83 kg) Grand Prix Semifinal.
Win	24–10–7	Daniel Acacio	Decision (unanimous)	PRIDE Bushido 9	September 25, 2005	2	5:00	Tokyo, Japan	PRIDE 2005 Welterweight (83 kg) Grand Prix Opening Round.
Win	23–10–7	Crosley Gracie	Decision	PRIDE Bushido 7	May 22, 2005	2	5:00	Tokyo, Japan	
Win	22–10–7	Tim McKenzie	TKO (punches)	Pancrase: Brave 10	November 7, 2004	2	2:53	Urayasu, Chiba, Japan	
Win	21–10–7	Tsuyoshi Kurihara	KO (punch)	Pancrase: Brave 6	June 22, 2004	1	2:15	Tokyo, Japan	
Loss	20–10–7	Maurício Rua	TKO (soccer kick)	PRIDE Bushido 2	February 15, 2004	1	9:04	Yokohama, Japan	Middleweight (93 kg) bout.
Win	20–9–7	Nilson de Castro	Decision (unanimous)	Pancrase: Hybrid 10	November 30, 2003	3	5:00	Tokyo, Japan	
Win	19–9–7	Daisuke Watanabe	KO (punch)	Pancrase: Hybrid 9	October 31, 2003	2	3:49	Tokyo, Japan	
Win	18–9–7	Nilson de Castro	DQ (groin strike)	Pancrase: 10th Anniversary Show	August 31, 2003	1	0:29	Tokyo, Japan	
Win	17–9–7	Flavio Luiz Moura	Decision (majority)	Pancrase: Hybrid 5	May 18, 2003	2	5:00	Tokyo, Japan	
Win	16–9–7	Chris Haseman	Decision (majority)	ZST 2: The Battle Field 2	March 9, 2003	3	5:00	Tokyo, Japan	Heavyweight bout.
Draw	15–9–7	Chael Sonnen	Draw	Pancrase: Hybrid 2	February 16, 2003	2	5:00	Tokyo, Japan	
Win	15–9–6	Keiichiro Yamamiya	TKO (punches)	Pancrase: Spirit 9	December 21, 2002	3	3:49	Tokyo, Japan	
Draw	14–9–6	Osami Shibuya	Draw	Pancrase: Spirit 6	August 25, 2002	3	5:00	Tokyo, Japan	
Win	14–9–5	Kousei Kubota	Decision (unanimous)	Pancrase: Spirit 4	May 11, 2002	3	5:00	Tokyo, Japan	
Loss	13–9–5	Yuki Kondo	TKO (corner stoppage)	Pancrase: Proof 7	December 1, 2001	3	0:52	Tokyo, Japan	
Win	13–8–5	Keiichiro Yamamiya	Decision (unanimous)	Pancrase: Proof 6	October 30, 2001	3	5:00	Tokyo, Japan	
Draw	12–8–5	Dustin Denes	Draw	DEEP: 2nd Impact	August 18, 2001	3	5:00	Tokyo, Japan	
Win	12–8–4	Daisuke Watanabe	TKO (doctor stoppage)	Pancrase: Proof 4	June 26, 2001	2	0:52	Tokyo, Japan	
Draw	11–8–4	Murilo Rua	Draw	Shooto: To The Top 4	May 1, 2001	3	5:00	Tokyo, Japan	
Win	11–8–3	Ivan Salaverry	KO (spinning back kick)	Shooto: To The Top 1	January 19, 2001	1	3:06	Tokyo, Japan	
Win	10–8–3	Masanori Suda	Decision (unanimous)	Shooto: R.E.A.D. 12	November 12, 2000	3	5:00	Tokyo, Japan	
Win	9–8–3	Andy Wang	Decision (unanimous)	Shooto: R.E.A.D. 5	May 22, 2000	3	5:00	Tokyo, Japan	
Draw	8–8–3	Larry Papadopoulos	Decision (draw)	Shooto: R.E.A.D. 1	January 14, 2000	3	5:00	Tokyo, Japan	
Loss	8–8–2	Lance Gibson	Decision (majority)	SB 13: SuperBrawl 13	September 7, 1999	3	5:00	Honolulu, Hawaii, United States	
Loss	8–7–2	Matt Hughes	Decision (unanimous)	Shooto: 10th Anniversary Event	May 29, 1999	3	5:00	Yokohama, Kanagawa, Japan	
Draw	8–6–2	Marcos da Silva	Draw	Shooto: Devilock Fighters	January 15, 1999	3	5:00	Tokyo, Japan	
Win	8–6–1	Adriano de Souza	Submission (armbar)	Shooto: Las Grandes Viajes 6	November 27, 1998	1	2:46	Tokyo, Japan	
Win	7–6–1	Matt Rocca	Submission (armbar)	Shooto: Shoot the Shooto XX	April 26, 1998	1	3:12	Tokyo, Japan	
Loss	6–6–1	Larry Papadopoulos	Decision (split)	Shooto: Reconquista 4	October 12, 1997	3	5:00	Tokyo, Japan	
Draw	6–5–1	Jutaro Nakao	Draw	Shooto: Gig	June 25, 1997	3	5:00	Yokohama, Kanagawa, Japan	
Win	6–5	Tsunemichi Nagano	Decision (unanimous)	Daidojuku: WARS 4	March 11, 1997	5	3:00	Tokyo, Japan	
Win	5–5	Masato Fujiwara	Decision (unanimous)	Shooto: Reconquista 1	January 18, 1997	4	3:00	Tokyo, Japan	
Loss	4–5	Kazuhiro Kusayanagi	Submission (armbar)	Shooto: Let's Get Lost	October 4, 1996	4	2:52	Japan	
Win	4–4	Masanori Suda	Submission (rear-naked choke)	Shooto: Free Fight Kawasaki	July 28, 1996	4	0:33	Japan	
Loss	3–4	Todd Bjornethun	Submission (armbar)	Shooto: Vale Tudo Junction 3	May 7, 1996	3	1:12	Japan	
Loss	3–3	Kazunari Murakami	Decision	Lumax Cup: Tournament of J '96	March 30, 1996	2	5:00	Japan	
Win	3–2	Yasushi Warita	Submission (Achilles lock)	Lumax Cup: Tournament of J '96	March 30, 1996	1	0:54	Japan	
Win	2–2	Tatsuharu Doi	Decision (majority)	Daidojuku: WARS 3	February 17, 1996	2	3:00	Japan	
Loss	1–2	Egan Inoue	Submission (armbar)	Lumax Cup: Tournament of J '95	October 13, 1995	1	1:33	Japan	
Win	1–1	Kazunari Murakami	KO (head kick)	Lumax Cup: Tournament of J '95	October 13, 1995	1	2:25	Japan	
Loss	0–1	Yasunori Okuda	Submission (toe hold)	Lumax Cup: Tournament of J '94	April 23, 1994	1	1:51	Japan	

=== Mixed rules ===
Professional record breakdown
1 match	1 win	0 losses
By knockout	1	0
By submission	0	0
By decision	0	0

Res.	Record	Opponent	Method	Event	Date	Round	Time	Location	Notes
Win	1-0	Tomoki Kanuka	TKO (strikes)	RINGS: Battle Genesis Vol.4	June 20, 1998	1	2:27	Nagoya, Japan	

== Submission grappling record ==
Result	Opponent	Method	Event	Date	Round	Time	Notes
Loss	(Brazil) Nino Schembri	Submission (rear-naked choke)	ADCC 2001 –88 kg	2001	1	1:48	
Loss	(Japan) Izuru Takeuchi	Decision	ADCC 2000 Japan -88 kg	2000	1	5:00	
Win	(Japan) Daisuke Igarashi	Submission (rear-naked choke)	ADCC 2000 Japan -88 kg	2000	1	1:13	
Win	(Japan) Minoru Toyonaga	Decision	The CONTENDERS 2	1999	2	5:00	
Loss	(Brazil) Ricardo Liborio	Decision	ADCC 1999 –88 kg	1999	1	10:00	

== Kickboxing record ==
Kickboxing record
11 wins, 9 losses
Date	Result	Opponent	Event	Location	Method	Round	Time	Record	Notes
November 30, 2016	Loss	(Japan) Hinata	Rebels 47	Tokyo, Japan	KO	2	2:43	11–9	
July 9, 2016	Loss	(China) Liu Jingtao	Hero Legends	China	Decision (unanimous)	3	3:00	11–8	
December 1, 2015	Win	(Japan) Yuki Sakamoto	Shootboxing 30th Anniversary Ground Zero Tokyo 2015	Tokyo, Japan	Decision	4	3:00	11–7	
October 10, 2015	Loss	(France) Bruce Codron	World GBC Tour 9	Mazan, France	Decision	3	3:00	10-7	
August 28, 2015	Win	(Thailand) Singbird Sitbang	Hero Legends	Dunhuang, China	Extra Round Decision	4	3:00	10–6	
July 28, 2015	Win	(China) Wu Go	Hero Legends	Dunhuang, China	Extra Round Decision	4	3:00	9–6	
July 17, 2015	Win	(China) Bunking To	Hero Legends	Dunhuang, China	Decision	3	3:00	8–6	
July 17, 2015	Win	(China) Sung Aki	Hero Legends	Dunhuang, China	Decision	3	3:00	7–6	
March 22, 2015	Win	(Japan) Jun Hirayama	Muay Thai Open 30	Tokyo, Japan	Decision	3	3:00	6–6	
November 17, 2012	Loss	(Japan) Satoru Suzuki	Shoot Boxing World Tournament 2012	Tokyo, Japan	TKO (referee stoppage)	1	3:00	5–6	Reserve bout.
September 17, 2012	Loss	(Thailand) Bovy Sor Udomson	Shootboxing 2012 – Act 4	Tokyo, Japan	TKO (referee stoppage)	1	2:15	5–5	
July 21, 2012	Win	(Japan) “KID HMC” SAGE	Deep Tokyo Impact 2012: Shootboxing S-Cup qualifier	Tokyo, Japan	Decision	3	3:00	5-4	
November 6, 2011	Loss	(Netherlands) Henri van Opstal	Shoot the Shooto	Tokyo, Japan	Decision	3	3:00	4–4	
May 29, 2011	Loss	(France) Yohan Lidon	Thai Fight Extreme	Tokyo, Japan	Decision	3	3:00	4–3	
May 29, 2011	Win	(Japan) Yamazaki Yoichi	Thai Fight	Japan	Decision (unanimous)	3	3:00	4–2	
May 29, 2011	Win	(Japan) Daisuke Tsutsumi	Thai Fight	Japan	Decision (unanimous)	3	3:00	3–2	
April 30, 2011	Loss	(Japan) Yuya Yamamoto	Krush The First Championship Tournament ~Triple Final Round~	Tokyo, Japan	Decision (unanimous)	3	3:00	2–2	
March 6, 2005	Loss	(Japan) Yuji Sakuragi	Pancrase 2005 Spiral Tour	Japan	KO (right straight)	2	1:17	2–1	
February 6, 2005	Win	(Japan) Kazushi Nishida	AJKF: Moving	Japan	KO (right straight)	4	1:33	2–0	Wins AJKF Heavyweight (+72 kg) Championship.
January 4, 2005	Win	(Japan) Convoy Yamashita	AJKF: Survivor	Japan	Decision (Unanimous)	3	3:00	1–0	
Legend: Win Loss Draw/No contest

== See also ==
- List of male mixed martial artists
