= 2003 in Pancrase =

Mixed martial arts events

Information
- First date: January 26, 2003
- Last date: December 21, 2003

Events
- Total events: 14

Fights
- Total fights: 114
- Title fights: 6

Chronology
| 2002 in Pancrase | 2003 in Pancrase | 2004 in Pancrase |

The year 2003 was the 11th year in the history of Pancrase, a mixed martial arts promotion based in Japan. In 2003 Pancrase held 14 events beginning with Pancrase: Hybrid 1.

== Title fights ==
Title fights in 2003
| Weight class | | | | Method | Round | Time | Event | Notes |
|---|---|---|---|---|---|---|---|---|
| Middleweight | Nate Marquardt (c) | def. | Izuru Takeuchi | KO (Punches) | 1 | 1:29 | Pancrase - Hybrid 3 | (Note: For the Pancrase Middleweight Championship.) |
| Light Heavyweight | Yuki Kondo | vs. | Sanae Kikuta (c) | Draw | 3 | 5:00 | Pancrase - Hybrid 5 | (Note: For the Pancrase Light Heavyweight Championship.) |
| Openweight | Josh Barnett | def. | Yuki Kondo | Submission (Rear-Naked Choke) | 3 | 3:26 | Pancrase - 10th Anniversary Show | (Note: For the Pancrase Openweight Championship.) |
| Light Heavyweight | Yuki Kondo | def. | Sanae Kikuta (c) | KO (Punch) | 3 | 0:08 | Pancrase - Hybrid 10 | (Note: For the Pancrase Light Heavyweight Championship.) |
| Middleweight | Ricardo Almeida | def. | Nate Marquardt (c) | Submission (Guillotine Choke) | 1 | 4:53 | Pancrase - Hybrid 10 | (Note: For the Pancrase Middleweight Championship.) |
| Welterweight | Kiuma Kunioku (c) | def. | Kenichi Serizawa | Decision (Unanimous) | 3 | 5:00 | Pancrase - Hybrid 10 | (Note: For the Pancrase Welterweight Championship.) |

== Events list ==
| # | Event Title | Date | Arena | Location |
|---|---|---|---|---|
| 132 | Pancrase: Hybrid 11 | December 21, 2003 | Differ Ariake Arena | Tokyo, Japan |
| 131 | Pancrase: Hybrid 10 | November 30, 2003 | Ryogoku Kokugikan | Tokyo, Japan |
| 130 | Pancrase: Hybrid 9 | October 31, 2003 | Korakuen Hall | Tokyo, Japan |
| 129 | Pancrase: Hybrid 8 | October 4, 2003 | Osaka International Convention Center | Osaka, Osaka, Japan |
| 128 | Pancrase: 10th Anniversary Show | August 31, 2003 | Ryogoku Kokugikan | Tokyo, Japan |
| 127 | Pancrase: 2003 Neo-Blood Tournament Second Round | July 27, 2003 | Korakuen Hall | Tokyo, Japan |
| 126 | Pancrase: 2003 Neo-Blood Tournament Opening Round | July 27, 2003 | Korakuen Hall | Tokyo, Japan |
| 125 | Pancrase: Hybrid 7 | June 22, 2003 | Umeda Stella Hall | Osaka, Osaka, Japan |
| 124 | Pancrase: Hybrid 6 | June 7, 2003 | Differ Ariake Arena | Tokyo, Japan |
| 123 | Pancrase: Hybrid 5 | May 18, 2003 | Yokohama Cultural Gymnasium | Yokohama, Kanagawa, Japan |
| 122 | Pancrase: Hybrid 4 | April 12, 2003 | Korakuen Hall | Tokyo, Japan |
| 121 | Pancrase: Hybrid 3 | March 8, 2003 | Differ Ariake Arena | Tokyo, Japan |
| 120 | Pancrase: Hybrid 2 | February 16, 2003 | Osaka International Convention Center | Osaka, Osaka, Japan |
| 119 | Pancrase: Hybrid 1 | January 26, 2003 | Korakuen Hall | Tokyo, Japan |

== Pancrase: Hybrid 1 ==
Pancrase: Hybrid 1
- Date: January 26, 2003
- Venue: Korakuen Hall
- City: Tokyo, Japan

Pancrase: Hybrid 1 was an event held on January 26, 2003 at Korakuen Hall in Tokyo, Japan.

=== Results ===
Main Card
| Weight class | | | | Method | Round | Time | Notes |
|---|---|---|---|---|---|---|---|
| | Yuki Kondo | vs. | Gabriel Vella | Draw | 2 | 5:00 |
| | Kazuo Misaki | def. | Joe D'Arce | TKO (Punches) | 2 | 4:51 |
| | Daisuke Watanabe | def. | Hidetada Irie | KO (Punches) | 1 | 4:18 |
| | Eiji Ishikawa | def. | Ichiro Kanai | Decision (Unanimous) | 2 | 5:00 |
| | Koji Oishi | vs. | Takuya Wada | Draw | 2 | 5:00 |
| | Satoru Kitaoka | def. | Hiroki Nagaoka | Decision (Unanimous) | 2 | 5:00 |
| | Yushin Okami | def. | Hikaru Sato | Decision (Unanimous) | 2 | 5:00 |
| | Shigeyuki Umeki | def. | Yohei Tagami | Decision (Majority) | 2 | 5:00 |
| | Reiji Shimabukuro | def. | Hideaki Hirayama | KO (Punch) | 1 | 1:02 |

== Pancrase: Hybrid 2 ==
Pancrase: Hybrid 2
- Date: February 16, 2003
- Venue: Osaka International Convention Center
- City: Osaka, Osaka, Japan

Pancrase: Hybrid 2 was an event held on February 16, 2003 at the Osaka International Convention Center in Osaka, Osaka, Japan.

=== Results ===
Main Card
| Weight class | | | | Method | Round | Time | Notes |
|---|---|---|---|---|---|---|---|
| | Ricardo Almeida | def. | Ikuhisa Minowa | Decision (Unanimous) | 3 | 5:00 |
| | Akihiro Gono | vs. | Chael Sonnen | Draw | 2 | 5:00 |
| | Kenichi Serizawa | def. | Roland Fabre | Submission (Rear-Naked Choke) | 1 | 2:58 |
| | Hidehiko Hasegawa | def. | Kosei Kubota | Submission (Armbar) | 2 | 3:05 |
| | Kengo Watanabe | def. | Koji Okuyama | Decision (Majority) | 2 | 5:00 |
| | Yuji Hoshino | def. | Takaku Fuke | Decision (Unanimous) | 2 | 5:00 |
| | Yoshiro Maeda | def. | Shigeyuki Umeki | Technical Submission (Rear-Naked Choke) | 2 | 1:49 |
| | Daichi Fujiwara | def. | Kenji Matsui | TKO (Punches) | 1 | 0:11 |
| | Kenji Takeshige | vs. | Satoshi Watanabe | Draw | 2 | 5:00 |
| | Daisuke Hanazawa | def. | Tetsuo Uehata | Submission (Rear-Naked Choke) | 1 | 1:39 |

== Pancrase: Hybrid 3 ==
Pancrase: Hybrid 3
- Date: March 8, 2003
- Venue: Differ Ariake Arena
- City: Tokyo, Japan

Pancrase: Hybrid 3 was an event held on March 8, 2003 at the Differ Ariake Arena in Tokyo, Japan.

=== Results ===
Main Card
| Weight class | | | | Method | Round | Time | Notes |
|---|---|---|---|---|---|---|---|
| Middleweight | Nate Marquardt (c) | def. | Izuru Takeuchi | KO (Punches) | 1 | 1:29 | (Note: For the Pancrase Middleweight Championship.) |
| | Yuki Kondo | def. | Sumio Koyano | TKO (Corner Stoppage) | 1 | 3:58 |
| | Kazuo Misaki | vs. | Yuji Hisamatsu | Draw | 2 | 5:00 |
| | Jun Ishii | def. | Jason Godsey | Submission (Punches) | 2 | 1:51 |
| | Naoki Seki | def. | Kenji Arai | Submission (Guillotine Choke) | 1 | 1:20 |
| | Taku Aramaki | vs. | Hiroto Makise | Draw | 2 | 5:00 |

== Pancrase: Hybrid 4 ==
Pancrase: Hybrid 4
- Date: April 12, 2003
- Venue: Korakuen Hall
- City: Tokyo, Japan

Pancrase: Hybrid 4 was an event held on April 12, 2003 at Korakuen Hall in Tokyo, Japan.

=== Results ===
Main Card
| Weight class | | | | Method | Round | Time | Notes |
|---|---|---|---|---|---|---|---|
| | Ricardo Almeida | def. | Yuki Sasaki | Decision (Unanimous) | 3 | 5:00 |
| | Kiuma Kunioku | def. | Hidetaka Monma | Decision (Unanimous) | 2 | 5:00 |
| | Koji Oishi | def. | Chris Lytle | Decision (Split) | 3 | 5:00 |
| | Mitsuyoshi Sato | vs. | Daisuke Watanabe | Draw | 2 | 5:00 |
| | Keiichiro Yamamiya | vs. | Tsuyoshi Kurihara | Draw | 2 | 5:00 |
| | Satoru Kitaoka | vs. | Takuya Wada | Draw | 2 | 5:00 |
| | Manao Kumagai | def. | Yuji Oba | Decision (Majority) | 2 | 5:00 |

== Pancrase: Hybrid 5 ==
Pancrase: Hybrid 5
- Date: May 18, 2003
- Venue: Yokohama Cultural Gymnasium
- City: Yokohama, Kanagawa, Japan

Pancrase: Hybrid 5 was an event held on May 18, 2003 at the Yokohama Cultural Gymnasium in Yokohama, Kanagawa, Japan.

=== Results ===
Main Card
| Weight class | | | | Method | Round | Time | Notes |
|---|---|---|---|---|---|---|---|
| Light Heavyweight | Yuki Kondo | vs. | Sanae Kikuta (c) | Draw | 3 | 5:00 | (Note: For the Pancrase Light Heavyweight Championship.) |
| | Akihiro Gono | def. | Flavio Luiz Moura | Decision (Majority) | 2 | 5:00 |
| | Kazuo Misaki | def. | Yuji Hisamatsu | Submission (Rear-Naked Choke) | 3 | 2:34 |
| | Evangelista Santos | def. | Osami Shibuya | KO (Punch) | 1 | 1:20 |
| | Koji Oishi | def. | Daisuke Hanazawa | Decision (Unanimous) | 2 | 5:00 |
| | Hiroki Nagaoka | vs. | Kenji Arai | Draw | 2 | 5:00 |
| | Yoshiro Maeda | def. | Mitsuhisa Sunabe | Decision (Unanimous) | 2 | 5:00 |
| | Shunichi Akimoto | def. | Kenji Nagai | Submission (Armbar) | 1 | 3:55 |

== Pancrase: Hybrid 6 ==
Pancrase: Hybrid 6
- Date: June 7, 2003
- Venue: Differ Ariake Arena
- City: Tokyo, Japan

Pancrase: Hybrid 6 was an event held on June 7, 2003 at Differ Ariake Arena in Tokyo, Japan.

=== Results ===
Main Card
| Weight class | | | | Method | Round | Time | Notes |
|---|---|---|---|---|---|---|---|
| | Nilson De Castro | def. | Keiichiro Yamamiya | TKO (Punches) | 1 | 4:00 |
| | Izuru Takeuchi | def. | Kosei Kubota | Decision (Unanimous) | 3 | 5:00 |
| | Kenichi Serizawa | vs. | Takuya Wada | Draw | 3 | 5:00 |
| | Hideki Tadao | def. | Jun Ishii | Decision (Split) | 2 | 5:00 |
| | Minoru Ozawa | def. | Takahito Iida | Decision (Unanimous) | 2 | 5:00 |
| | Ichiro Kanai | vs. | Shinpei Sotoyama | Draw | 2 | 5:00 |
| | Masahito Wachi | def. | Reiji Shimabukuro | Decision (Majority) | 2 | 5:00 |
| | Miki Shida | def. | Yoshinobu Ota | Decision (Unanimous) | 2 | 5:00 |

== Pancrase: Hybrid 7 ==
Pancrase: Hybrid 7
- Date: June 22, 2003
- Venue: Umeda Stella Hall
- City: Osaka, Osaka, Japan

Pancrase: Hybrid 7 was an event held on June 22, 2003 at Umeda Stella Hall in Osaka, Osaka, Japan.

=== Results ===
Main Card
| Weight class | | | | Method | Round | Time | Notes |
|---|---|---|---|---|---|---|---|
| | Kiuma Kunioku | def. | Katsuomi Inagaki | Submission (Rear-Naked Choke) | 1 | 4:10 |
| | Daisuke Watanabe | def. | Yuki Sasaki | KO (Punch) | 1 | 4:18 |
| | Yuji Hoshino | vs. | Satoru Kitaoka | Draw | 3 | 5:00 |
| | Hidehiko Hasegawa | def. | Hikaru Sato | Decision (Split) | 2 | 5:00 |
| | Yoshiro Maeda | def. | Shinya Sato | Decision (Majority) | 2 | 5:00 |
| | Satoshi Watanabe | def. | Kenji Takeshige | KO (Knee) | 1 | 1:16 |
| | Naoji Fujimoto | def. | Joji Kawamata | Submission (Ankle Lock) | 1 | 1:47 |

== Pancrase: 2003 Neo-Blood Tournament Opening Round ==
Pancrase: 2003 Neo-Blood Tournament Opening Round
- Date: July 27, 2003
- Venue: Korakuen Hall
- City: Tokyo, Japan

Pancrase: 2003 Neo-Blood Tournament Opening Round was an event held on July 27, 2003 at Korakuen Hall in Tokyo, Japan.

=== Results ===
Main Card
| Weight class | | | | Method | Round | Time | Notes |
|---|---|---|---|---|---|---|---|
| | Kazuo Takahashi | def. | Tsuyoshi Ozawa | TKO (Doctor Stoppage) | 1 | 5:00 |
| | Yuichi Nakanishi | def. | Ichiro Kanai | Decision (Unanimous) | 2 | 5:00 |
| | Masakatsu Okuda | def. | Sen Nakadai | TKO (Leg Kicks) | 3 | 0:43 |
| | Naoki Seki | def. | Daisuke Hanazawa | Decision (Unanimous) | 2 | 5:00 |
| | Takahito Iida | def. | Kenji Arai | Submission (Armbar) | 1 | 3:03 |
| | Yoshiro Maeda | def. | Takahiro Sanehara | TKO (Punches) | 2 | 1:06 |
| | Miki Shida | def. | Reiji Shimabukuro | Decision (Unanimous) | 2 | 5:00 |

== Pancrase: 2003 Neo-Blood Tournament Second Round ==
Pancrase: 2003 Neo-Blood Tournament Second Round
- Date: July 27, 2003
- Venue: Korakuen Hall
- City: Tokyo, Japan

Pancrase: 2003 Neo-Blood Tournament Second Round was an event held on July 27, 2003 at Korakuen Hall in Tokyo, Japan.

=== Results ===
Main Card
| Weight class | | | | Method | Round | Time | Notes |
|---|---|---|---|---|---|---|---|
| | Yuichi Nakanishi | def. | Masakatsu Okuda | Submission (Armbar) | 2 | 4:35 |
| | Naoki Seki | def. | Takahito Iida | Decision (Unanimous) | 2 | 5:00 |
| | Yoshiro Maeda | def. | Miki Shida | Decision (Unanimous) | 2 | 5:00 |
| | Keiichiro Yamamiya | def. | Nate Marquardt | Decision (Unanimous) | 3 | 5:00 |
| | Eiji Ishikawa | def. | Hidetaka Monma | Decision (Unanimous) | 3 | 5:00 |
| | Osami Shibuya | def. | Shunichi Akimoto | Decision (Unanimous) | 2 | 5:00 |
| | Minoru Ozawa | vs. | Manao Kumagai | Draw | 2 | 5:00 |
| | Takumi Murata | def. | Minoru Tsuiki | Submission (Armbar) | 2 | 2:37 |

== Pancrase: 10th Anniversary Show ==
Pancrase: 10th Anniversary Show
- Date: August 31, 2003
- Venue: Ryogoku Kokugikan
- City: Tokyo, Japan

Pancrase: 10th Anniversary Show was an event held on August 31, 2003 at Ryogoku Kokugikan in Tokyo, Japan.

=== Results ===
Main Card
| Weight class | | | | Method | Round | Time | Notes |
|---|---|---|---|---|---|---|---|
| Openweight | Josh Barnett | def. | Yuki Kondo | Submission (Rear-Naked Choke) | 3 | 3:26 | (Note: For the Pancrase Openweight Championship.) |
| | Sanae Kikuta | def. | Elvis Sinosic | Decision (Unanimous) | 3 | 5:00 |
| | Crosley Gracie | def. | Kiuma Kunioku | Decision (Unanimous) | 3 | 5:00 |
| | Akihiro Gono | def. | Nilson de Castro | DQ (Groin Strike) | 1 | 0:29 |
| | Yuki Sasaki | def. | Heath Sims | Decision (Unanimous) | 3 | 5:00 |
| | Ricardo Almeida | def. | Kazuo Misaki | Decision (Majority) | 3 | 5:00 |
| | Osami Shibuya | def. | Toru Yano | Submission (Armbar) | 2 | 2:35 |
| | Minoru Suzuki | def. | Takashi Iizuka | Decision (unanimous) | 3 | 5:00 |

== Pancrase: Hybrid 8 ==
Pancrase: Hybrid 8
- Date: October 4, 2003
- Venue: Osaka International Convention Center
- City: Osaka, Osaka, Japan

Pancrase: Hybrid 8 was an event held on October 4, 2003 at Osaka International Convention Center in Osaka, Osaka, Japan.

=== Results ===
Main Card
| Weight class | | | | Method | Round | Time | Notes |
|---|---|---|---|---|---|---|---|
| | Takafumi Ito | def. | Daisuke Hanazawa | Decision (Majority) | 2 | 5:00 |
| | Nate Marquardt | def. | Yuji Hisamatsu | Decision (Unanimous) | 2 | 5:00 |
| | Keiichiro Yamamiya | vs. | Keith Jardine | Draw | 2 | 5:00 |
| | Yoshiro Maeda | def. | Satoshi Watanabe | Decision (Unanimous) | 2 | 5:00 |
| | Takumi Yano | def. | Kenji Takeshige | KO (Spinning Backfist) | 1 | 2:19 |
| | Yoshinobu Ota | vs. | Daichi Fujiwara | Draw | 2 | 5:00 |
| | Naoji Fujimoto | def. | Yasuhiro Kanayama | Technical Submission (Armbar) | 1 | 4:22 |
| | Masahito Kawamoto | def. | Koichi Hioki | KO (Punch) | 1 | 0:22 |
| | Takashi Hasegawa | vs. | Yutaka Nishikawa | Draw | 2 | 5:00 |

== Pancrase: Hybrid 9 ==
Pancrase: Hybrid 9
- Date: October 31, 2003
- Venue: Korakuen Hall
- City: Tokyo, Japan

Pancrase: Hybrid 9 was an event held on October 31, 2003 at Korakuen Hall in Tokyo, Japan.

=== Results ===
Main Card
| Weight class | | | | Method | Round | Time | Notes |
|---|---|---|---|---|---|---|---|
| | Akihiro Gono | def. | Daisuke Watanabe | KO (Punch) | 2 | 3:49 |
| | Izuru Takeuchi | vs. | Eiji Ishikawa | Draw | 3 | 5:00 |
| | Ron Waterman | def. | Jun Ishii | Submission (Neck Crank) | 1 | 1:02 |
| | Yuichi Nakanishi | def. | Kosei Kubota | TKO (Punches) | 2 | 2:46 |
| | Satoru Kitaoka | def. | Naoki Seki | Decision (Unanimous) | 3 | 5:00 |
| | Hur Sung Jin | def. | Keigo Takamori | KO (Punches) | 1 | 0:18 |
| | Takuya Wada | def. | Minoru Ozawa | Decision (Unanimous) | 2 | 5:00 |
| | Miki Shida | def. | Masahito Wachi | Decision (Unanimous) | 2 | 5:00 |
| | Ismael Aoki | def. | Tony Nelson | NC (Doctor Stoppage) | 2 | 2:59 |

== Pancrase: Hybrid 10 ==
Pancrase: Hybrid 10
- Date: November 30, 2003
- Venue: Ryogoku Kokugikan
- City: Tokyo, Japan

Pancrase: Hybrid 10 was an event held on November 30, 2003 at Ryogoku Kokugikan in Tokyo, Japan.

=== Results ===
Main Card
| Weight class | | | | Method | Round | Time | Notes |
|---|---|---|---|---|---|---|---|
| Light Heavyweight | Yuki Kondo | def. | Sanae Kikuta (c) | KO (Punch) | 3 | 0:08 | (Note: For the Pancrase Light Heavyweight Championship.) |
| Middleweight | Ricardo Almeida | def. | Nate Marquardt (c) | Submission (Guillotine Choke) | 1 | 4:53 | (Note: For the Pancrase Middleweight Championship.) |
| Welterweight | Kiuma Kunioku (c) | def. | Kenichi Serizawa | Decision (Unanimous) | 3 | 5:00 | (Note: For the Pancrase Welterweight Championship.) |
| | Akihiro Gono | def. | Nilson de Castro | Decision (Unanimous) | 3 | 5:00 |
| | Ron Waterman | vs. | Jimmy Ambriz | Draw | 3 | 5:00 |
| | Kazuo Misaki | vs. | Jake Shields | Draw | 3 | 5:00 |
| | Yoshiro Maeda | def. | Baret Yoshida | KO (Punches) | 1 | 1:29 |
| | Yasuhiro Kirita | vs. | Yuya Shirai | Draw | 2 | 5:00 |
| | Takumi Murata | vs. | Atsushi Yamamoto | Draw | 2 | 5:00 |

== Pancrase: Hybrid 11 ==
Pancrase: Hybrid 11
- Date: December 21, 2003
- Venue: Differ Ariake Arena
- City: Tokyo, Japan

Pancrase: Hybrid 11 was an event held on December 21, 2003 at Differ Ariake Arena in Tokyo, Japan.

=== Results ===
Main Card
| Weight class | | | | Method | Round | Time | Notes |
|---|---|---|---|---|---|---|---|
| | David Terrell | def. | Yuki Sasaki | KO (Punch) | 2 | 0:15 |
| | Keiichiro Yamamiya | vs. | Bret Bergmark | Draw | 3 | 5:00 |
| | Eiji Ishikawa | def. | Hidehiko Hasegawa | Decision (Unanimous) | 3 | 5:00 |
| | Osami Shibuya | def. | Tsuyoshi Kurihara | Decision (Unanimous) | 2 | 5:00 |
| | Yukiya Naito | def. | Hur Sung Jin | Submission (Arm-Triangle Choke) | 1 | 2:34 |
| | Koji Oishi | def. | Takahito Iida | Decision (Unanimous) | 2 | 5:00 |
| | Takafumi Ito | def. | Linson Simanjuntak | Submission (Triangle Kimura) | 1 | 3:46 |
| | Daisuke Hanazawa | vs. | Kenji Arai | Draw | 2 | 5:00 |
| | Yuichi Ikari | def. | Hirokazu Takamoto | KO (Punch) | 2 | 3:28 |
| | Tetsu Sasaki | vs. | Atsushi Yamamoto | Draw | 2 | 5:00 |

== See also ==
- Pancrase
- List of Pancrase champions
- List of Pancrase events
