= Satoru Kitaoka =

Japanese martial artist (born 1980)

Satoru Kitaoka 北岡悟
- Born: February 4, 1980 (age 46); Nara, Japan
- Other names: "Ai Senshi" ("Soldier of Sorrow") "Shimewaza Kuma Shōgun" ("The Shōgun Bear of Chokes")
- Nationality: Japanese
- Height: 5 ft 6 in (1.68 m)
- Weight: 156 lb (71 kg; 11.1 st)
- Division: Heavyweight; Middleweight; Welterweight; Lightweight
- Fighting out of: Shinjuku, Tokyo, Japan
- Team: Pancraseism (2000–2010); Lotus Paraestra (2010–2012); Nippon Top Team; Impact Gym
- Teachers: Masakatsu Funaki; Minoru Suzuki; Yuki Nakai
- Rank: A-level Shoot wrestler; Black belt in Jiu-Jitsu; Black belt in Judo
- Years active: 2000–present

Mixed martial arts record
- Total: 85
- Wins: 45
- By submission: 22
- By decision: 23
- Losses: 30
- By knockout: 13
- By decision: 17
- Draws: 10

Other information
- Mixed martial arts record from Sherdog
- Last updated on: September 11, 2009

Satoru Kitaoka (Japanese: 北岡悟, Kitaoka Satoru; born 4 February 1980), is a Japanese shoot wrestler and mixed martial artist who most recently competed for RIZIN. A professional competitor since 2000, he has also competed for DREAM, Pancrase, DEEP, and World Victory Road. Kitaoka is renowned for his catch wrestling abilities which he learned studying under two of Japan's most respected catch wrestlers Masakatsu Funaki and Minoru Suzuki. He is also a Brazilian jiu jitsu blackbelt under Yuki Nakai. A master of the guillotine choke and leg lock submissions, Kitaoka holds notable wins over Takanori Gomi, Paul Daley, and Carlos Condit.

== Background ==
Kitaoka became interested in mixed martial arts after seeing Bas Rutten and Masakatsu Funaki fight in Pancrase in 1996. In addition to mixed martial arts success, Kitaoka has also won several submission grappling tournaments, including being an All Japan Combat Wrestling champion and Brazilian jiu-jitsu and No-Gi Open Champion in weight and absolute.

== Personal life ==
Kitaoka spends his time taking care of his body, getting massages three times a week, utilizing saunas, and carbonated and ice baths. He also enjoys spending time on social media. Kitaoka also teaches at his gym and coaches his teammates.

== Mixed martial arts career ==
=== Pancrase ===
Renowned originally for his catch wrestling abilities, Kitaoka made his professional debut for Pancrase on October 31, 2000, losing via majority decision. After submitting then 3-0 Kurt Pellegrino, Kitaoka drew with Heath Sims before losing to Katsuya Inoue. After picking up two wins to start 2005, Kitaoka improved to 12-6-8 before he faced future UFC interim welterweight champion Carlos Condit on October 2, 2005. Kitaoka defeated Condit in an upset, submitting him with a heel hook at 3:57 of the first round.

A leg lock specialist, Kitaoka would improve to 19-7-9 before facing Katsuya Inoue on January 30, 2008 for the third time after being defeating in their first meeting and a draw in the previous bout. Kitaoka lost via split decision.

=== Sengoku ===
After signing with World Victory Road, Kitaoka's first fight for Sengoku was a submission win over Ian James Schaffa at Sengoku 2 on 18 May 2008 before entering Sengoku's eight-man lightweight tournament. In the first round of the tournament at Sengoku 4 on 24 August 2008 he was put up against American Clay French. Kitaoka made short work of French, winning by submission due to an achilles lock at 1:21 of the first round. The win put him up against fellow Japanese fighter Eiji Mitsuoka in the tournament's semifinal taking place at World Victory Road Presents: Sengoku 6. Kitaoka again made short work of his opponent winning by a heel hook submission at 1:16 of the first round. The win earned him a place in the tournament's final taking place that same night against Kazunori Yokota. The fight proved longer than Kitaoka's three previous fights as it went the distance completing all three five-minute rounds with Kitaoka being awarded the unanimous decision, thus winning the 2008 Sengoku Lightweight Grand Prix.

The Lightweight tournament win set up Kitaoka to fight the last reigning PRIDE Lightweight Champion, Takanori Gomi, for Sengoku's newly created Sengoku Lightweight Championship. The two fought at Sengoku no Ran 2009 on 4 January 2009 and ended with Kitaoka defeating Gomi with an achilles lock at 1:41 of the first round.

In his first title defence, on August 2, 2009, at World Victory Road Presents: Sengoku 9, Kitaoka lost his lightweight championship to Mizuto Hirota.

=== Return to Pancrase ===
Following his title loss in Sengoku, Kitaoka returned to his home promotion Pancrase picking up wins over Jorge Rogrigues and Kuniyoshi Hironaka.

=== DREAM ===
Kitaoka faced former UFC fighter Willamy Freire at DREAM 17. Kitaoka entered the bout on a three fight win streak picking up victories in both Pancrase and DEEP. He won the fight via split decision.

Kitaoka faced teammate and fellow Yuki Nakai black belt Shinya Aoki at DREAM's year end event for the DREAM Lightweight Championship. He lost the fight via unanimous decision.

=== RIZIN FF ===
Kitaoka made his debut for Rizin Fighting Federation in 2016. He faced Daron Cruickshank on December 29, 2016, at RIZIN World Grand-Prix 2016: 2nd Round and won the fight via technical submission in the first round.

Kitaoka next faced Yusuke Yachi on July 30, 2017, at Rizin FF 6: RIZIN World Grand Prix 2017 Opening Round Part 1. He lost the fight via TKO in the second round.

Kitaoka returned at RIZIN World Grand Prix 2017: Second Round, facing Kiichi Kunimoto in a catchweight bout of 165 lbs. Kitaoka lost via unanimous decision.

After picking a first-round heel hook win in Pancrase, Kitaoka returned to the RIZIN ring at RIZIN 11 against Diego Brandao. While attempting a leg lock submission on the ground, Kitaoka left himself vulnerable to a flurry of right hands from Brandao on the top, being knocked out just 1:38 into the fight.

After losing to Brandao, Kitaoka lost in his fifth defense of his DEEP Lightweight Championship to Koji Takeda via unanimous decision.

Kitaoka returned to face Tatsuya Kawajiri at RIZIN: Heisei's Last Yarennoka! for New Year's Eve in 2018. After a fairly impressive performance which included a surprising Kitoka knockdown from a left cross, Kitaoka won via split decision.

He then faced Roberto de Souza at Rizin 15 on April 21, 2019. He lost the fight via second-round knockout.

Kitaoka faced Johnny Case at Rizin 17 on July 28, 2019. He lost the fight via corner stoppage after the first round.

Kitaoka then went on to create his own MMA promotion and fought Sho Kogane at its inaugural event Ismos 1 on July 31, 2020. The bout was declared a draw.

Before his fight at RIZIN 24, Kitaoka said restrictions from the COVID-19 pandemic didn't really change anything in his training camp and he simply followed the new rules about masks with ease. He lost the fight against Takasuke Kume via split decision.

=== Return to DEEP ===
After a stint in Rizin, Kitaoka returned to DEEP and faced Juri Ohara at Deep 100 on February 21, 2021. He lost the fight via first-round knockout.

Kitaoka is scheduled to face Takumi Suzuki at Deep 104 on October 23, 2021. Going into the fight, Kitaoka worked on conditioning extensively to make sure he was prepared for the fight. He lost the bout after getting knocked out by a knee in the third round.

Kitaoka faced Hiroto Uesako at Deep 108 Impact on July 10, 2022. He lost the bout by split decision.

Kitaoka faced Kimihiro Eto at Deep 110 Impact on November 12, 2022. He lost the bout by unanimous decision.

Kitaoka faced Yuki Takano on February 11, 2023 at DEEP 112, winning for the first time in 4 years via north-south choke in the third round.

Kitaoka faced Ryota Oki at Deep x Nariagari on July 23, 2023. He won the bout by split decision.

Kitaoka faced Takeshi Izumi on November 11, 2023 at DEEP: 113 Impact, losing the bout via split decision.

== Championships and accomplishments ==
=== In submission wrestling ===
- Japan Combat Wrestling Federation
  - 14th All Japan Combat Wrestling Championships - 80 kg champion (2008)
  - 14th All Japan Combat Wrestling Championships - MVP (2008)

=== In mixed martial arts ===
- Sengoku Raiden Championship
  - 2008 Sengoku Lightweight Grand Prix Champion
  - Sengoku Raiden Championship Lightweight Champion (One time; first)
- DEEP
  - DEEP Lightweight Champion (One time; former)
    - Four successful title defenses

== Mixed martial arts record ==
Professional record breakdown
85 matches	45 wins	30 losses
By knockout	0	13
By submission	22	0
By decision	23	17
Draws	10	

Res.	Record	Opponent	Method	Event	Date	Round	Time	Location	Notes
Loss	45–30–10	Yajuro Yamasaki	Decision (unanimous)	DEEP 133 Impact	September 13, 2026	3	5:00	Tokyo, Japan	
Loss	45–29–10	Shoma Yamada	Decision (unanimous)	DEEP 128 Impact	November 2, 2025	3	5:00	Tokyo, Japan	
Loss	45–28–10	Soshi Yamamoto	Decision (unanimous)	DEEP 124 Impact	March 15, 2025	3	5:00	Tokyo, Japan	
Loss	45–27–10	Daigo Kuramoto	TKO (knee to the body and punches)	DEEP 119 Impact	3 May 2024	1	4:55	Tokyo, Japan	
Loss	45–26–10	Takeshi Izumi	Decision (split)	DEEP 116 Impact	11 November 2023	3	5:00	Tokyo, Japan	
Win	45–25–10	Ryota Oki	Decision (split)	DEEP x Nariagari	23 July 2023	3	5:00	Tokyo, Japan	
Win	44–25–10	Takuya Oyama	Submission (guillotine choke)	DEEP 113 Impact	7 May 2023	3	2:24	Tokyo, Japan	
Win	43–25–10	Yuki Takano	Submission (north-south choke)	DEEP 112 Impact	11 February 2023	3	3:47	Tokyo, Japan	
Loss	42–25–10	Kimihiro Eto	Decision (unanimous)	DEEP 110 Impact	12 November 2022	3	5:00	Tokyo, Japan	
Loss	42–24–10	Hiroto Uesako	Decision (split)	Deep 108 Impact	10 July 2022	3	5:00	Tokyo, Japan	
Loss	42–23–10	Takumi Suzuki	KO (knee)	Deep 104 Impact	23 October 2021	3	0:27	Tokyo, Japan	
Loss	42–22–10	Juri Ohara	KO (stomp and punches)	Deep 100 Impact 20th Anniversary	21 February 2021	1	4:43	Tokyo, Japan	
Loss	42–21–10	Takasuke Kume	Decision (split)	Rizin 24	27 September 2020	3	5:00	Saitama, Japan	
Draw	42–20–10	Sho Kogane	Draw	Ismos 1	31 July 2020	3	5:00	Yokohama, Japan	
Loss	42–20–9	Johnny Case	TKO (corner stoppage)	Rizin 17	July 28, 2019	1	5:00	Saitama, Japan	
Loss	42–19–9	Roberto de Souza	TKO (punches)	Rizin 15	April 21, 2019	2	3:56	Yokohama, Japan	
Win	42–18–9	Tatsuya Kawajiri	Decision (split)	RIZIN: Heisei's Last Yarennoka!	December 31, 2018	3	5:00	Saitama, Japan	
Loss	41–18–9	Koji Takeda	Decision (unanimous)	DEEP: 86 Impact	October 27, 2018	3	5:00	Tokyo, Japan	Lost the Deep Lightweight Championship.
Loss	41–17–9	Diego Brandao	KO (punches)	RIZIN 11	July 29, 2018	1	1:38	Saitama, Japan	
Win	41–16–9	Taras Sapa	Submission (heel hook)	Pancrase 295	April 15, 2018	1	4:44	Tokyo, Japan	
Loss	40–16–9	Kiichi Kunimoto	Decision (unanimous)	RIZIN World Grand Prix 2017: Second Round	December 29, 2017	2	5:00	Saitama, Japan	Catchweight (165 lbs) bout.
Loss	40–15–9	Yusuke Yachi	TKO (punches)	RIZIN FF 6: RIZIN World Grand Prix 2017 Opening Round Part 1	July 30, 2017	2	4:46	Saitama, Japan	
Win	40–14–9	Daron Cruickshank	Technical Submission (guillotine choke)	RIZIN World Grand-Prix 2016: 2nd Round	December 29, 2016	1	8:18	Saitama, Japan	
Win	39–14–9	Leonardo Mafra Texeira	Submission (heel hook)	Pancrase 281	October 2, 2016	1	1:05	Tokyo, Japan	
Win	38–14–9	Kota Shimoishi	Decision (unanimous)	DEEP: 76 Impact	June 26, 2016	3	5:00	Tokyo, Japan	Defended the Deep Lightweight Championship.
Loss	37–14–9	Kazuki Tokudome	KO (punches)	Pancrase: 271	November 1, 2015	4	1:24	Tokyo, Japan	For the vacant Pancrase Lightweight Championship.
Win	37–13–9	Yuki Okano	Submission (guillotine choke)	DEEP: Cage Impact 2015	July 20, 2015	2	0:54	Tokyo, Japan	Defended the Deep Lightweight Championship.
Win	36–13–9	Akira Okada	Decision (unanimous)	Pancrase: 265	March 15, 2015	3	5:00	Tokyo, Japan	
Win	35–13–9	Yoshiyuki Yoshida	Decision (unanimous)	DEEP: DREAM Impact 2014: Omisoka Special	December 31, 2014	3	5:00	Saitama, Japan	Defended the Deep Lightweight Championship.
Win	34–13–9	Richie Whitson	Decision (unanimous)	Pancrase: 261	October 5, 2014	3	5:00	Tokyo, Japan	
Win	33–13–9	Naoto Miyazaki	Decision (unanimous)	DEEP: 66 Impact	April 29, 2014	3	5:00	Tokyo, Japan	Defended the Deep Lightweight Championship.
Loss	32–13–9	Ramazan Esenbaev	KO (punches)	Inoki Bom-Ba-Ye 2013	December 31, 2013	2	0:19	Tokyo, Japan	
Win	32–12–9	Dom O'Grady	Technical Submission (guillotine choke)	Pancrase 252: 20th Anniversary	September 29, 2013	1	1:19	Yokohama, Kanagawa, Japan	
Win	31–12–9	Daisuke Nakamura	Decision (unanimous)	DEEP: 62 Impact	April 26, 2013	3	5:00	Tokyo, Japan	Won the Deep Lightweight Championship.
Loss	30–12–9	Will Brooks	TKO (punches)	DREAM 18	December 31, 2012	2	1:18	Tokyo, Japan	
Win	30–11–9	Katsunori Kikuno	Decision (unanimous)	DEEP: 58 Impact	June 15, 2012	3	5:00	Tokyo, Japan	
Loss	29–11–9	Shinya Aoki	Decision (unanimous)	Fight For Japan: Genki Desu Ka Omisoka 2011	December 31, 2011	5	5:00	Saitama, Saitama, Japan	For the DREAM Lightweight Championship.
Win	29–10–9	Willamy Freire	Decision (split)	DREAM 17	September 24, 2011	3	5:00	Saitama, Saitama, Japan	
Win	28–10–9	Jutaro Nakao	Decision (unanimous)	DEEP: 53 Impact	April 22, 2011	3	5:00	Tokyo, Japan	Welterweight bout.
Win	27–10–9	Kuniyoshi Hironaka	Submission (guillotine choke)	Pancrase: Passion Tour 9	October 3, 2010	2	4:22	Tokyo, Japan	
Win	26–10–9	Jorge Rodrigues	Decision (unanimous)	Pancrase: Passion Tour 5	June 5, 2010	3	5:00	Tokyo, Japan	
Loss	25–10–9	Jorge Masvidal	KO (punches)	World Victory Road Presents: Sengoku 11	November 7, 2009	2	3:23	Tokyo, Japan	
Loss	25–9–9	Mizuto Hirota	TKO (knees)	World Victory Road Presents: Sengoku 9	August 2, 2009	4	2:50	Saitama, Saitama, Japan	Lost the Sengoku Lightweight Championship.
Win	25–8–9	Yukio Sakaguchi	Submission (achilles lock)	Pancrase: Changing Tour 3	June 6, 2009	1	1:26	Saitama, Saitama, Japan	
Win	24–8–9	Takanori Gomi	Submission (achilles lock)	World Victory Road Presents: Sengoku no Ran 2009	January 4, 2009	1	1:41	Saitama, Japan	Won the inaugural Sengoku Lightweight Championship.
Win	23–8–9	Kazunori Yokota	Decision (unanimous)	World Victory Road Presents: Sengoku 6	November 1, 2008	3	5:00	Saitama, Japan	Won the Sengoku Lightweight Grandprix 2008.
Win	22–8–9	Eiji Mitsuoka	Submission (heel hook)	World Victory Road Presents: Sengoku 6	November 1, 2008	1	1:16	Saitama, Japan	
Win	21–8–9	Clay French	Submission (achilles lock)	World Victory Road Presents: Sengoku 4	August 24, 2008	1	0:31	Saitama, Japan	
Win	20–8–9	Ian James Schaffa	Submission (guillotine choke)	World Victory Road Presents: Sengoku 2	May 18, 2008	1	0:50	Tokyo, Japan	Return to Lightweight.
Loss	19–8–9	Katsuya Inoue	Decision (split)	Pancrase: Shining 1	January 30, 2008	3	5:00	Tokyo, Japan	For the vacant Pancrase Welterweight Championship.
Win	19–7–9	Jason Palacios	Decision (split)	Pancrase: Rising 6	September 5, 2007	3	5:00	Tokyo, Japan	
Win	18–7–9	Fabricio Monteiro	Submission (arm-triangle choke)	DEEP: 29 Impact	April 13, 2007	2	2:37	Tokyo, Japan	Lightweight bout.
Win	17–7–9	Gustavo Picone	Decision (unanimous)	Pancrase: Rising 2	February 28, 2007	3	5:00	Tokyo, Japan	
Win	16–7–9	Ju Pyo Hong	Submission (achilles lock)	Pancrase: Blow 9	October 25, 2006	1	0:24	Tokyo, Japan	
Win	15–7–9	Paul Daley	Submission (guillotine choke)	Pancrase: Blow 6	August 27, 2006	1	2:54	Yokohama, Japan	
Loss	14–7–9	Daizo Ishige	Decision (unanimous)	Pancrase: Blow 4	May 2, 2006	3	5:00	Tokyo, Japan	
Win	14–6–9	Tatsunori Tanaka	Submission (guillotine choke)	Pancrase: Blow 2	March 19, 2006	2	2:53	Osaka, Japan	Lightweight bout.
Draw	13–6–9	Katsuya Inoue	Draw	Pancrase: Blow 1	January 26, 2006	3	5:00	Tokyo, Japan	For the Pancrase Interim Welterweight Championship.
Win	13–6–8	Carlos Condit	Submission (heel hook)	Pancrase: Spiral 8	October 2, 2005	1	3:57	Yokohama, Japan	
Win	12–6–8	Thomas Schulte	Submission (heel hook)	Pancrase: Spiral 5	July 10, 2005	1	1:11	Yokohama, Japan	
Win	11–6–8	Hidehiko Hasegawa	Decision (split)	Pancrase: Spiral 2	March 6, 2005	3	5:00	Yokohama, Japan	
Loss	10–6–8	Katsuya Inoue	Decision (unanimous)	Pancrase: Brave 10	November 7, 2004	3	5:00	Tokyo, Japan	
Draw	10–5–8	Heath Sims	Draw	Pancrase: Brave 8	September 24, 2004	3	5:00	Tokyo, Japan	
Win	10–5–7	Kurt Pellegrino	Submission (guillotine choke)	Pancrase: 2004 Neo-Blood Tournament Semifinals	July 25, 2004	2	0:34	Tokyo, Japan	
Win	9–5–7	Takaichi Hirayama	Submission (guillotine choke)	Pancrase: Brave 5	May 28, 2004	2	4:05	Tokyo, Japan	Lightweight bout.
Loss	8–5–7	Eiji Ishikawa	Decision (unanimous)	Pancrase: Brave 3	March 29, 2004	3	5:00	Tokyo, Japan	Middleweight bout.
Draw	8–4–7	Tadahiro Hosaka	Draw	Pancrase: Brave 2	February 15, 2004	2	5:00	Osaka, Japan	Heavyweight bout.
Win	8–4–6	Naoki Seki	Decision (unanimous)	Pancrase: Hybrid 9	October 31, 2003	3	5:00	Tokyo, Japan	
Draw	7–4–6	Yuji Hoshino	Draw	Pancrase: Hybrid 7	June 22, 2003	3	5:00	Osaka, Japan	
Draw	7–4–5	Takuya Wada	Draw	Pancrase: Hybrid 4	April 12, 2003	2	5:00	Tokyo, Japan	
Win	7–4–4	Hiroki Nagaoka	Decision (unanimous)	Pancrase: Hybrid 1	January 26, 2003	2	5:00	Tokyo, Japan	
Win	6–4–4	Taro Minato	Decision (majority)	Pancrase: Spirit 7	October 29, 2002	2	5:00	Tokyo, Japan	Return to Welterweight.
Loss	5–4–4	Hidetaka Monma	KO (knee)	Pancrase: 2002 Neo-Blood Tournament Second Round	July 28, 2002	1	0:05	Tokyo, Japan	
Win	5–3–4	Kenji Arai	Submission (toe hold)	Pancrase: 2002 Neo-Blood Tournament Second Round	July 28, 2002	3	2:08	Tokyo, Japan	
Win	4–3–4	Hiroyuki Nozawa	Decision (unanimous)	Pancrase: 2002 Neo-Blood Tournament Opening Round	July 28, 2002	2	5:00	Tokyo, Japan	Heavyweight debut.
Win	3–3–4	Kenji Arai	Decision (majority)	Pancrase: Spirit 4	May 11, 2002	2	5:00	Osaka, Japan	
Loss	2–3–4	Koji Oishi	Decision (majority)	Pancrase: Spirit 3	March 25, 2002	2	5:00	Tokyo, Japan	Welterweight debut.
Draw	2–2–4	Hiroki Nagaoka	Draw	Pancrase: Proof 7	December 1, 2001	2	5:00	Yokohama, Japan	
Win	2–2–3	Yohei Ota	Decision (39-38)	GCM: The Contenders 6	October 8, 2001	2	5:00	Yokohama, Japan	Lightweight bout.
Draw	1–2–3	Junya Miyakawa	Draw	Pancrase: Proof 5	August 25, 2001	2	5:00	Osaka, Japan	
Draw	1–2–2	Kenichi Serizawa	Draw	GCM: Club Contenders 1	August 15, 2001	2	3:00	Tokyo, Japan	Lightweight bout.
Loss	1–2–1	Yuji Hoshino	Decision (unanimous)	Pancrase: Proof 4	June 26, 2001	2	5:00	Tokyo, Japan	
Draw	1–1–1	Kousei Kubota	Draw	Pancrase: Proof 2	March 31, 2001	2	5:00	Osaka, Japan	Middleweight debut.
Win	1–1	Kazuhito Kikuchi	Decision (unanimous)	Pancrase: Trans 8	December 9, 2000	1	10:00	Aomori, Aomori, Japan	
Loss	0–1	Yoshinori Kawasaki	Decision (majority)	Pancrase: Trans 6	October 31, 2000	1	10:00	Tokyo, Japan	

== See also ==
- List of current mixed martial arts champions
- List of male mixed martial artists

New championship	1st Sengoku Lightweight Champion; January 4, 2009 – August 2, 2009	Succeeded by Mizuto Hirota
