= Hidetaka Monma =

Japanese mixed martial arts fighter

Hidetaka Monma 門馬秀貴
- Born: October 23, 1973 (age 52); Tokyo, Japan
- Other names: "The Nobleman of the Cage", "The Tiger's Messenger", "The Japanese Arona"
- Nationality: Japanese
- Height: 1.82 m (6 ft 0 in)
- Weight: 80 kg (176 lb; 12 st 8 lb)
- Division: Middleweight; Welterweight; Lightweight
- Stance: Orthodox
- Team: Wajyutsu Keisyukai Brightness
- Years active: 2001-2012,2013-2014

Mixed martial arts record
- Total: 33
- Wins: 18
- By knockout: 2
- By submission: 11
- By decision: 5
- Losses: 11
- By knockout: 6
- By decision: 5
- Draws: 4

Other information
- Mixed martial arts record from Sherdog

Hidetaka Monma (Japanese: 門馬秀貴) (October 23, 1973), is a Japanese mixed martial artist who last competed in 2014. A professional since 2001, he competed for Pancrase, DREAM, DEEP, RINGS, and K-1 HERO'S.

== Background ==
Monma began training in jujutsu at age of 13 and in MMA at age of 25, when he joined Wajyutsu Keisyukai A-3 and made his professional debut on September 21, 2001 against Hiroshiji Ito at RINGS Battle Genesis Vol.8. Monma later started Wajyutsu Keisyukai Brightness.

== Mixed martial arts record ==
Professional record breakdown
33 matches	18 wins	11 losses
By knockout	2	6
By submission	11	0
By decision	5	5
Draws	4	

Res.	Record	Opponent	Method	Event	Date	Round	Time	Location	Notes
Loss	18–11–4	Ken Hamamura	TKO (corner stoppage)	DEEP: 66 Impact	April 29, 2014	2	2:02	Tokyo, Japan	
Win	18–10–4	Junya Nishikawa	Submission (arm-triangle choke)	Grabaka Live! 3	October 27, 2013	1	2:40	Tokyo, Japan	Return to Lightweight.
Loss	17–10–4	Yuki Sasaki	Decision (unanimous)	Grabaka Live: 1st Cage Attack	October 15, 2011	3	5:00	Tokyo, Japan	
Win	17–9–4	Yoshihisa Yamamoto	Submission (arm-triangle choke)	DEEP: 50 Impact	October 24, 2010	1	1:07	Tokyo, Japan	
Draw	16–9–4	Ryuki Ueyama	Draw	DEEP: 47 Impact	April 17, 2010	3	5:00	Tokyo, Japan	
Win	16–9–3	Dong Hyun Ma	Decision (Unanimous)	DEEP: Fan Thanksgiving Festival 2	November 10, 2009	2	5:00	Tokyo, Japan	
Loss	15–9–3	Seichi Ikemoto	TKO (knee to the body and punches)	DEEP: 40 Impact	February 20, 2009	1	1:42	Tokyo, Japan	For the DEEP Welterweight Championship.
Win	15–8–3	Andre Mafetoni	Submission (guillotine choke)	GCM: Cage Force EX Eastern Bound	November 8, 2008	1	4:47	Tokyo, Japan	
Loss	14–8–3	Hayato Sakurai	TKO (punches)	DREAM 1: Lightweight Grand Prix 2008 First Round	March 15, 2008	1	4:12	Saitama, Japan	
Win	14–7–3	Yong Hoon Lee	Submission (armbar)	GCM: Cage Force EX Eastern Bound	February 11, 2008	1	1:44	Tokyo, Japan	
Loss	13–7–3	Dan Hardy	TKO (corner stoppage)	GCM: Cage Force 4	September 8, 2007	3	0:28	Tokyo, Japan	
Win	13–6–3	Janne Tulirinta	Submission (omoplata)	GCM: Cage Force 2	March 17, 2007	1	1:48	Tokyo, Japan	
Loss	12–6–3	Luigi Fioravanti	TKO (punches)	GCM: D.O.G. 7	September 9, 2006	1	2:31	Tokyo, Japan	
Loss	12–5–3	Gesias Cavalcante	TKO (punches)	HERO'S 5	May 3, 2006	1	2:08	Tokyo, Japan	HERO'S 2006 Middleweight Grand Prix Opening Round.
Draw	12–4–3	Rodrigo Gracie	Draw	MARS World Grand Prix	February 4, 2006	3	5:00	Tokyo, Japan	
Win	12–4–2	Jess Liaudin	Submission (armbar)	GCM: D.O.G. 3	September 15, 2005	1	2:14	Tokyo, Japan	
Win	11–4–2	Dave Strasser	KO (punch)	GCM: D.O.G. 2	July 11, 2005	1	3:30	Tokyo, Japan	
Win	10–4–2	Chatt Lavender	Submission (triangle choke)	GCM: D.O.G. 1	March 12, 2005	1	2:40	Tokyo, Japan	
Loss	9–4–2	Hidehiko Hasegawa	Decision (unanimous)	Pancrase: Brave 12	December 21, 2004	3	5:00	Tokyo, Japan	
Win	9–3–2	Takafumi Ito	Submission (triangle choke)	Pancrase: Brave 9	October 12, 2004	1	1:34	Tokyo, Japan	
Draw	8–3–2	Hiroyuki Nozawa	Draw (unanimous)	Pancrase: 2004 Neo-Blood Tournament Final	July 25, 2004	2	5:00	Tokyo, Japan	
Loss	8–3–1	Takuya Wada	Decision (majority)	Pancrase: Brave 5	May 28, 2004	3	5:00	Tokyo, Japan	Middleweight bout.
Win	8–2–1	Seichi Ikemoto	Submission (arm triangle choke)	DEEP: 13th Impact	January 22, 2004	2	3:53	Tokyo, Japan	
Draw	7–2–1	Hiroki Nagaoka	Draw	GCM: Demolition 030923	September 23, 2003	2	5:00	Japan	Return to Welterweight.
Loss	7–2	Eiji Ishikawa	Decision (unanimous)	Pancrase: 2003 Neo-Blood Tournament Second Round	July 27, 2003	3	5:00	Tokyo, Japan	
Loss	7–1	Kiuma Kunioku	Decision (unanimous)	Pancrase: Hybrid 4	April 12, 2003	2	5:00	Tokyo, Japan	Middleweight debut.
Win	7–0	Hiroyuki Ito	Decision	GCM: Demolition 030126	January 26, 2003	2	5:00	Tokyo, Japan	
Win	6–0	Satoru Kitaoka	KO (knee)	Pancrase: 2002 Neo-Blood Tournament Second Round	July 28, 2002	1	0:05	Tokyo, Japan	Neo-Blood Tournament Final.
Win	5–0	Masashi Suzuki	Submission (triangle armbar)	Pancrase: 2002 Neo-Blood Tournament Second Round	July 28, 2002	2	3:48	Tokyo, Japan	Neo-Blood Tournament Semifinal Round.
Win	4–0	Kazuki Okubo	Decision (split)	Pancrase: 2002 Neo-Blood Tournament Second Round	July 28, 2002	3	5:00	Tokyo, Japan	Neo-Blood Tournament Opening Round.
Win	3–0	Hidehisa Matsuda	Submission (triangle choke)	GCM: ORG 2nd	May 12, 2002	1	2:35	Tokyo, Japan	
Win	2–0	Kyosuke Sasaki	Decision (majority)	RINGS: World Title Series 5	December 21, 2001	2	5:00	Kanagawa, Japan	
Win	1–0	Hiroyuki Ito	Decision (majority)	RINGS: Battle Genesis Vol. 8	September 21, 2001	3	5:00	Tokyo, Japan	
