= 2004 in Pancrase =

Mixed martial arts events

Information
- First date: February 6, 2004
- Last date: December 21, 2004

Events
- Total events: 16

Fights
- Total fights: 143

Chronology
2003 in Pancrase	2004 in Pancrase	2005 in Pancrase

The year 2004 was the 12th year in the history of Pancrase, a mixed martial arts promotion based in Japan. In 2004 Pancrase held 16 events beginning with Pancrase: Brave 1.

== Title fights ==
Title fights in 2004
Weight class				Method	Round	Time	Event	Notes
Super Heavyweight	Tsuyoshi Kosaka	def.	Ron Waterman	Decision (Unanimous)	3	5:00	Pancrase: Brave 10	(Note: For the Pancrase Super Heavyweight Championship.)
Middleweight	Nate Marquardt	def.	Kazuo Misaki	Decision (Unanimous)	3	5:00	Pancrase: Brave 10	(Note: For the Pancrase Middleweight Championship.)

== Events list ==
#	Event title	Date	Arena	Location
148	Pancrase: Brave 12	December 21, 2004	Korakuen Hall	Tokyo, Japan
147	Pancrase: Brave 11	November 26, 2004	Korakuen Hall	Tokyo, Japan
146	Pancrase: Hybrid Fight 2004	November 7, 2004	Hybrid Wrestling Kagoshima Gym	Izumi, Kagoshima, Japan
145	Pancrase: Brave 10	November 7, 2004	Tokyo Bay NK Hall	Urayasu, Chiba, Japan
144	Pancrase: Brave 9	October 12, 2004	Korakuen Hall	Tokyo, Japan
143	Pancrase: Brave 8	September 24, 2004	Korakuen Hall	Tokyo, Japan
142	Pancrase: Brave 7	August 22, 2004	Umeda Stella Hall	Osaka, Osaka, Japan
141	Pancrase: 2004 Neo-Blood Tournament Final	July 25, 2004	Korakuen Hall	Tokyo, Japan
140	Pancrase: 2004 Neo-Blood Tournament Semifinals	July 25, 2004	Korakuen Hall	Tokyo, Japan
139	Pancrase: Brave 6	June 22, 2004	Korakuen Hall	Tokyo, Japan
138	Pancrase: Brave 5	May 28, 2004	Korakuen Hall	Tokyo, Japan
137	Pancrase: 2004 Neo-Blood Tournament Eliminations	May 2, 2004	Gold's Gym South Tokyo Annex	Tokyo, Japan
136	Pancrase: Brave 4	April 23, 2004	Korakuen Hall	Tokyo, Japan
135	Pancrase: Brave 3	March 29, 2004	Korakuen Hall	Tokyo, Japan
134	Pancrase: Brave 2	February 15, 2004	Umeda Stella Hall	Osaka, Osaka, Japan
133	Pancrase: Brave 1	February 6, 2004	Korakuen Hall	Tokyo, Japan

== Pancrase: Brave 1 ==
Pancrase: Brave 1
- Date: February 6, 2004
- Venue: Korakuen Hall
- City: Tokyo, Japan

Pancrase: Brave 1 was an event held on February 6, 2004, at Korakuen Hall in Tokyo, Japan.

=== Results ===
Main Card
Weight class				Method	Round	Time	Notes
	Kazuo Misaki	def.	Kiuma Kunioku	TKO (Doctor Stoppage)	2	1:31
	Osami Shibuya	def.	Art Santore	Decision (Majority)	3	5:00
	Koji Oishi	vs.	Heath Sims	Draw (Majority)	3	5:00
	Eiji Ishikawa	def.	Katsuya Inoue	Decision (Majority)	2	5:00
	Keigo Takamori	def.	Hideki Tadao	KO (Punch)	1	1:25
	Hur Sung Jin	def.	Alex Roberts	TKO (Punches)	1	1:22
	Miki Shida	def.	Mitsuhisa Sunabe	Decision (Unanimous)	2	5:00
	Atsushi Yamamoto	def.	Reiji Shimabukuro	Decision (Unanimous)	2	5:00
	Kenji Shimada	vs.	Manabu Inoue	Draw (Time Limit)	2	5:00

== Pancrase: Brave 2 ==
Pancrase: Brave 2
- Date: February 15, 2004
- Venue: Umeda Stella Hall
- City: Osaka, Osaka, Japan

Pancrase: Brave 2 was an event held on February 15, 2004, at Umeda Stella Hall in Osaka, Osaka, Japan.

=== Results ===
Main Card
Weight class				Method	Round	Time	Notes
	Yoshiro Maeda	def.	Alexandre De Freitas	TKO (Flying Knee and Punches)	2	0:25
	Takafumi Ito	vs.	Yuji Hoshino	Draw (Majority)	3	5:00
	Satoru Kitaoka	vs.	Tadahiro Hosaka	Draw (Unanimous)	2	5:00
	Yuji Oba	def.	Satoshi Watanabe	Decision (Majority)	2	5:00
	Daisuke Hanazawa	vs.	Takuo Miyata	Draw (Unanimous)	2	5:00
	Yohei Tagami	def.	Naoji Fujimoto	Technical Submission (Rear-Naked Choke)	1	3:03
	Noriyuki Kitaura	vs.	Masahito Kawamoto	Draw (Time Limit)	2	5:00
	Yuichi Ikari	def.	Toru Iizuka	Submission (Armbar)	1	4:44
	Takafumi Shiroma	def.	Joji Kawamata	Submission (Armbar)	2	2:18

== Pancrase: Brave 3 ==
Pancrase: Brave 3
- Date: March 29, 2004
- Venue: Korakuen Hall
- City: Tokyo, Japan

Pancrase: Brave 3 was an event held on March 29, 2004, at Korakuen Hall in Tokyo, Japan.

=== Results ===
Main Card
Weight class				Method	Round	Time	Notes
	Yuki Kondo	def.	Steve Heath	Submission (Rear-Naked Choke)	1	4:01
	Keigo Takamori	def.	Jun Ishii	KO (Punch)	1	0:40
	David Terrell	def.	Osami Shibuya	Submission (Rear-Naked Choke)	1	3:04
	Eiji Ishikawa	def.	Satoru Kitaoka	Decision (Unanimous)	3	5:00
	Hikaru Sato	def.	Yuichi Nakanishi	Decision (Majority)	3	5:00
	Hidehiko Hasegawa	vs.	Seiki Ryo	Draw (Unanimous)	2	5:00
	Yukiya Naito	def.	Mitsuyoshi Sato	Submission (Triangle Choke)	1	3:30
	Taku Aramaki	vs.	Naoki Yoshimura	Draw (Time Limit)	2	5:00
	Ippo Watanuki	def.	Mitsuo Matsumoto	Submission (Armbar)	1	3:23

== Pancrase: Brave 4 ==
Pancrase: Brave 4
- Date: April 23, 2004
- Venue: Korakuen Hall
- City: Tokyo, Japan

Pancrase: Brave 4 was an event held on April 23, 2004, at Korakuen Hall in Tokyo, Japan.

=== Results ===
Main Card
Weight class				Method	Round	Time	Notes
	Sanae Kikuta	def.	Keith Rockel	Decision (Majority)	3	5:00
	Izuru Takeuchi	def.	Kiuma Kunioku	Decision (Majority)	3	5:00
	Kengo Watanabe	vs.	Tadahiro Hosaka	Draw (Split)	2	5:00
	Yuji Hoshino	vs.	Koji Oishi	Draw (Majority)	3	5:00
	Daisuke Watanabe	def.	Yoshinori Momose	TKO (Head Kick and Punches)	1	4:53
	Takafumi Ito	def.	Minoru Ozawa	Decision (Unanimous)	2	5:00
	Kenji Arai	def.	Naoki Seki	Decision (Unanimous)	2	5:00
	Katsuya Inoue	def.	Ichiro Kanai	Decision (Majority)	2	5:00
	Hidenobu Koike	def.	Ryota Nishimura	Submission (Armbar)	1	4:23

== Pancrase: 2004 Neo-Blood Tournament Eliminations ==
Pancrase: 2004 Neo-Blood Tournament Eliminations
- Date: May 2, 2004
- Venue: Gold's Gym South Tokyo Annex
- City: Tokyo, Japan

Pancrase: 2004 Neo-Blood Tournament Eliminations was an event held on May 2, 2004, at Gold's Gym South Tokyo Annex in Tokyo, Japan.

=== Results ===
Main Card
Weight class				Method	Round	Time	Notes
	Yuji Oba	def.	Naoki Yoshimura	Decision (Unanimous)	2	5:00
	Takuo Miyata	def.	Satoshi Nishino	TKO (Punches)	1	4:05
	Ippo Watanuki	def.	Chikara Sato	Decision (Unanimous)	2	5:00
	Masayuki Demise	def.	Naoji Fujimoto	Decision (Unanimous)	2	5:00
	Atsushi Yamamoto	def.	Minoru Tsuiki	TKO (Punches)	2	1:57
	Daichi Fujiwara	def.	Takumi Murata	Decision (Unanimous)	2	5:00
	Yohei Tagami	def.	Tetsu Sasaki	Decision (Unanimous)	2	5:00
	Sotaro Yamada	def.	Akito Teraoka	Decision (Split)	1	5:00
	Tomoya Miyashita	def.	Masaki Sakurazawa	Decision (Unanimous)	1	5:00
	Naoji Fujimoto	def.	Masahiro Watanabe	Decision (Unanimous)	1	5:00
	Masayuki Demise	def.	Takashi Hasegawa	Decision (Unanimous)	1	5:00

== Pancrase: Brave 5 ==
Pancrase: Brave 5
- Date: May 28, 2004
- Venue: Korakuen Hall
- City: Tokyo, Japan

Pancrase: Brave 5 was an event held on May 28, 2004, at Korakuen Hall in Tokyo, Japan.

=== Results ===
Main Card
Weight class				Method	Round	Time	Notes
	Ron Waterman	def.	Keigo Takamori	Submission (Keylock)	1	1:36
	Yuki Sasaki	def.	Yukiya Naito	Decision (Unanimous)	3	5:00
	Keiichiro Yamamiya	def.	Kozo Urita	Decision (Unanimous)	2	5:00
	Yoshiro Maeda	def.	Isamu Sugiuchi	KO (Punch)	1	1:32
	Takuya Wada	def.	Hidetaka Monma	Decision (Majority)	3	5:00
	Yuichi Nakanishi	def.	Hidehiko Hasegawa	Decision (Majority)	3	5:00
	Hiroyuki Nozawa	def.	Takahito Iida	Decision (Unanimous)	2	5:00
	Satoru Kitaoka	def.	Takaichi Hirayama	Submission (Guillotine Choke)	2	4:05
	Motokazu Kobayashi	def.	Masato Onodera	KO (Punch)	2	0:08

== Pancrase: Brave 6 ==
Pancrase: Brave 6
- Date: June 22, 2004
- Venue: Korakuen Hall
- City: Tokyo, Japan

Pancrase: Brave 6 was an event held on June 22, 2004, at Korakuen Hall in Tokyo, Japan.

=== Results ===
Main Card
Weight class				Method	Round	Time	Notes
	Yuki Kondo	def.	Shannon Ritch	Submission (Kneebar)	1	1:01
	Nate Marquardt	vs.	Eiji Ishikawa	Draw (Majority)	3	5:00
	Izuru Takeuchi	vs.	Osami Shibuya	Draw (Unanimous)	3	5:00
	Akihiro Gono	def.	Tsuyoshi Kurihara	KO (Punch)	1	2:15
	Katsuya Inoue	def.	Hikaru Sato	TKO (Punches)	1	3:53
	Koji Oishi	def.	Masakazu Kuramochi	TKO (Punches)	2	4:13
	Masashi Kameda	def.	Mitsuhisa Sunabe	DQ (Head-butt)	1	3:52
	Ken Orihashi	def.	Kosaku Shikimasu	No Contest	1	4:18
	Kazuya Hirose	vs.	Motokazu Kobayashi	Draw (Time Limit)	2	5:00

== Pancrase: 2004 Neo-Blood Tournament Semifinals ==
Pancrase: 2004 Neo-Blood Tournament Semifinals
- Date: July 25, 2004
- Venue: Korakuen Hall
- City: Tokyo, Japan

Pancrase: 2004 Neo-Blood Tournament Semifinals was an event held on July 25, 2004, at Korakuen Hall in Tokyo, Japan.

=== Results ===
Main Card
Weight class				Method	Round	Time	Notes
	Fabio Leopoldo	def.	Yuki Sasaki	Decision (Majority)	3	5:00
	Satoru Kitaoka	def.	Kurt Pellegrino	Submission (Guillotine Choke)	2	0:34
	Joe D'Arce	def.	Hiromitsu Miura	Submission (Punches)	3	4:56
	Kobus Huisamen	def.	Ryuta Noji	KO (Punch)	1	0:12
	Yuji Oba	def.	Sotaro Yamada	Decision (Unanimous)	2	5:00
	Ippo Watanuki	def.	Takuo Miyata	Decision (Unanimous)	3	5:00
	Atsushi Yamamoto	def.	Yohei Tagami	Decision (Unanimous)	2	5:00
	Naoji Fujimoto	def.	Masayuki Demise	Decision (Majority)	2	5:00

== Pancrase: 2004 Neo-Blood Tournament Final ==
Pancrase: 2004 Neo-Blood Tournament Final
- Date: July 25, 2004
- Venue: Korakuen Hall
- City: Tokyo, Japan

Pancrase: 2004 Neo-Blood Tournament Final was an event held on July 25, 2004, at Korakuen Hall in Tokyo, Japan.

=== Results ===
Main Card
Weight class				Method	Round	Time	Notes
	Kazuo Misaki	def.	Ed Herman	Technical Submission (Arm-Triangle Choke)	2	3:31
	Keiichiro Yamamiya	def.	Chael Sonnen	Decision (Majority)	3	5:00
	Heath Sims	def.	Takafumi Ito	TKO (Punches)	1	3:35
	Yuji Oba	def.	Ippo Watanuki	KO (Knee)	1	2:35
	Atsushi Yamamoto	def.	Naoji Fujimoto	Decision (Unanimous)	2	5:00
	Hidetaka Monma	vs.	Hiroyuki Nozawa	Draw (Unanimous)	2	5:00
	Noriki Miyashita	def.	Toshinobu Komeya	TKO (Punches)	1	0:15
	Daiki Hata	vs.	Ryusuke Uemura	Draw (Time Limit)	2	5:00

== Pancrase: Brave 7 ==
Pancrase: Brave 7
- Date: August 22, 2004
- Venue: Umeda Stella Hall
- City: Osaka, Osaka, Japan

Pancrase: Brave 7 was an event held on August 22, 2004, at Umeda Stella Hall in Osaka, Osaka, Japan.

=== Results ===
Main Card
Weight class				Method	Round	Time	Notes
	Yoshiro Maeda	def.	Fredson Paixao	Decision (Unanimous)	3	5:00
	Nilson de Castro	def.	Daisuke Watanabe	KO (Knee)	2	1:14
	Kenji Arai	def.	Yasuyuki Tokuoka	TKO (Doctor Stoppage)	1	5:00
	Hideki Tadao	def.	Tsuyoshi Ozawa	Decision (Unanimous)	2	5:00
	Masashi Kameda	vs.	Mitsuhisa Sunabe	Draw	2	5:00
	Daisuke Hanazawa	def.	Masato Nishiguchi	Decision (Unanimous)	2	5:00
	Yuji Miyazaki	def.	Manao Kumagai	Submission (Rear-Naked Choke)	1	3:29
	Rikiya Kawakami	vs.	Kenta Nakamura	Draw	2	5:00
	Yutaka Nishikawa	def.	Yosuke Kobayashi	Submission (Armbar)	1	4:14
	Tetsuo Uehata	def.	Koichi Kitagawa	Submission (Achilles Lock)	1	3:36

== Pancrase: Brave 8 ==
Pancrase: Brave 8
- Date: September 24, 2004
- Venue: Korakuen Hall
- City: Tokyo, Japan

Pancrase: Brave 8 was an event held on September 24, 2004, at Korakuen Hall in Tokyo, Japan.

=== Results ===
Main Card
Weight class				Method	Round	Time	Notes
	Keigo Takamori	def.	Anthony Netzler	KO (Punch)	1	0:49
	Heath Sims	vs.	Satoru Kitaoka	Draw	3	5:00
	Yuki Sasaki	def.	Buck Meredith	Submission (Triangle Choke)	2	3:13
	Alex Roberts	def.	Kengo Watanabe	Decision (Split)	3	5:00
	Katsuya Inoue	def.	Takuya Wada	Decision (Unanimous)	3	5:00
	Hiromitsu Miura	def.	Yuichi Nakanishi	Decision (Majority)	2	5:00
	Yuya Shirai	def.	Mitsuyoshi Sato	Decision (Majority)	2	5:00
	Naoki Seki	vs.	Daizo Ishige	Draw	2	5:00
	Mitsuo Matsumoto	def.	Motokazu Kobayashi	Decision (Unanimous)	2	5:00
	Tomoya Miyashita	def.	Tomoya Sasahara	Submission (Kimura)	2	1:04

== Pancrase: Brave 9 ==
Pancrase: Brave 9
- Date: October 12, 2004
- Venue: Korakuen Hall
- City: Tokyo, Japan

Pancrase: Brave 9 was an event held on October 12, 2004, at Korakuen Hall in Tokyo, Japan.

=== Results ===
Main Card
Weight class				Method	Round	Time	Notes
	Yushin Okami	def.	Eiji Ishikawa	Decision (Unanimous)	3	5:00
	Hidehiko Hasegawa	def.	Koji Oishi	Technical Submission (Toe Hold)	2	5:00
	Hidetaka Monma	def.	Takafumi Ito	Submission (Triangle Choke)	1	1:34
	Osami Shibuya	def.	Seong Hee Kim	TKO (Punches)	1	0:31
	Hikaru Sato	vs.	Kyosuke Sasaki	Draw	2	5:00
	Ippo Watanuki	def.	Kazuhiro Inoue	Submission (Kneebar)	2	2:51
	Miki Shida	def.	Masayuki Demise	Submission (Guillotine Choke)	2	0:43
	Hiroyuki Ota	def.	Taku Aramaki	Decision (Unanimous)	2	5:00
	Kazuya Hirose	def.	Masato Onodera	Decision (Unanimous)	2	5:00

== Pancrase: Brave 10 ==
Pancrase: Brave 10
- Date: November 7, 2004
- Venue: Tokyo Bay NK Hall
- City: Urayasu, Chiba, Japan

Pancrase: Brave 10 was an event held on November 7, 2004, at Tokyo Bay NK Hall in Urayasu, Chiba, Japan.

=== Results ===
Main Card
Weight class				Method	Round	Time	Notes
	Yuki Kondo	def.	Evangelista Santos	Decision (Unanimous)	3	5:00
Super Heavyweight	Tsuyoshi Kosaka	def.	Ron Waterman	Decision (Unanimous)	3	5:00	(Note: For the Pancrase Super Heavyweight Championship.)
Middleweight	Nate Marquardt	def.	Kazuo Misaki	Decision (Unanimous)	3	5:00	(Note: For the Pancrase Middleweight Championship.)
	Sanae Kikuta	def.	Webster Dauphiney	Submission (Achilles Lock)	1	2:14
	Ryuta Noji	def.	Ryushi Yanagisawa	Decision (Unanimous)	3	5:00
	Akihiro Gono	def.	Tim McKenzie	TKO (Punches)	2	2:53
	Katsuya Inoue	def.	Satoru Kitaoka	Decision (Unanimous)	3	5:00
	Hiromitsu Miura	def.	Yoon Seob Kwak	TKO (Punches)	1	0:54

== Pancrase: Hybrid Fight 2004 ==
Pancrase: Hybrid Fight 2004
- Date: November 7, 2004
- Venue: Hybrid Wrestling Kagoshima Gym
- City: Izumi, Kagoshima, Japan

Pancrase: Hybrid Fight 2004 was an event held on November 7, 2004, at the Hybrid Wrestling Kagoshima Gym in Izumi, Kagoshima, Japan.

=== Results ===
Main Card
Weight class				Method	Round	Time	Notes
	Kenji Honda	def.	Takayuki Nakasato	Submission (Armbar)	2	3:58
	Shinji Fujimoto	def.	Hayato Minami	Submission (Armbar)	1	2:36
	Hirotaka Uehara	vs.	Takahide Naito	Draw	2	5:00
	Taishi Ikeda	def.	Kazuyuki Arimura	Decision (Unanimous)	2	5:00
	Ryuji Oshiro	def.	Go Matsuo	Submission (Rear-Naked Choke)	1	3:53
	Kenji Horikiri	def.	Shinichiro Hattori	Submission (Triangle Choke)	2	0:46

== Pancrase: Brave 11 ==
Pancrase: Brave 11
- Date: November 26, 2004
- Venue: Korakuen Hall
- City: Tokyo, Japan

Pancrase: Brave 11 was an event held on November 26, 2004, at Korakuen Hall in Tokyo, Japan.

=== Results ===
Main Card
Weight class				Method	Round	Time	Notes
	Gustavo Machado	def.	Keiichiro Yamamiya	Submission (Heel Hook)	3	1:20
	Yuki Sasaki	def.	Yuya Shirai	Decision (Unanimous)	3	5:00
	Izuru Takeuchi	def.	Seiki Ryo	TKO (Shoulder Injury)	1	5:00
	Daisuke Hanazawa	def.	Osami Shibuya	Decision (Unanimous)	2	5:00
	Yuji Hisamatsu	def.	Hikaru Sato	Decision (Unanimous)	2	5:00
	Kenji Arai	def.	Hiroyuki Nozawa	KO (Head Kick)	2	3:33
	Ken Orihashi	def.	Noriki Miyashita	TKO (Retirement)	2	4:02
	Daizo Ishige	def.	Hidenobu Koike	TKO (Punches)	1	4:22
	Mitsuo Matsumoto	def.	Hiroyuki Ota	Decision (Unanimous)	2	5:00
	Tomoya Miyashita	def.	Kazuya Hirose	Submission (Guillotine Choke)	1	4:30

== Pancrase: Brave 12 ==
Pancrase: Brave 12
- Date: December 21, 2004
- Venue: Korakuen Hall
- City: Tokyo, Japan

Pancrase: Brave 12 was an event held on December 21, 2004, at Korakuen Hall in Tokyo, Japan.

=== Results ===
Main Card
Weight class				Method	Round	Time	Notes
	Kestutis Arbocius	def.	Daisuke Watanabe	Decision (Unanimous)	3	5:00
	Hidehiko Hasegawa	def.	Hidetaka Monma	Decision (Unanimous)	3	5:00
	James Lee	def.	Kengo Watanabe	Technical Submission (Rear-Naked Choke)	1	0:55
	Hisae Watanabe	def.	Hisako Watanabe	KO (Punch)	2	1:07
	Yoshiro Maeda	def.	Minoru Tsuiki	KO (Punch and Kick)	1	4:02
	Eiji Ishikawa	def.	Yuichi Nakanishi	Decision (Unanimous)	3	5:00
	Miki Shida	def.	Atsushi Yamamoto	KO (Knee)	2	4:36
	Mitsuo Matsumoto	def.	Tomoya Miyashita	Decision (Unanimous)	2	5:00
	Asaki Honda	vs.	Shinsuke Shoji	Draw (Time Limit)	2	5:00

== See also ==
- Pancrase
- List of Pancrase champions
- List of Pancrase events
