= Heath Sims =

American Olympic wrestler and mixed martial artist

- Born: October 14, 1971 (age 55); Huntington Beach, California, U.S.
- Height: 5 ft 9 in (1.75 m)
- Weight: 176 lb (80 kg; 12 st 8 lb)
- Division: Lightweight; Welterweight
- Team: Team Quest
- Rank: Olympian Greco-Roman wrestling
- Years active: 2002 - 2006 (MMA)

Mixed martial arts record
- Total: 11
- Wins: 5
- By knockout: 3
- By submission: 1
- By decision: 1
- Losses: 4
- By knockout: 1
- By submission: 1
- By decision: 2
- Draws: 2

Other information
- Mixed martial arts record from Sherdog

Heath Sims (born October 14, 1971) is an American mixed martial artist, Olympic wrestler and MMA trainer. He is a long time training partner of Dan Henderson and a highly respected MMA coach who was the wrestling instructor for the US team on The Ultimate Fighter: United States vs. United Kingdom.

In 2011, he sold his share in Team Quest and moved to Singapore to become the head of the wrestling program at Evolve MMA.

== Wrestling ==
Sim's Father was a freestyle wrestler who competed in the 1972 Olympic trials. As a ninth grader Sims began training with the San Clemente Jets, which became the California Jets an amateur wrestling club where kids from all over California came to learn freestyle and Greco-Roman techniques. He won state championships in 1988 and 1989 but instead of going to college and continuing a freestyle career, Sims decided to keep wrestling in the Greco style. He became a junior national team member in 1989 and a world team member in 1990.

In 1996 he quit wrestling in order to work for a computer company but he missed the competition and began to practice again, finishing third at the 1998 U.S. World Team trials. However, in 1999 while he was training at the U.S. Olympic facilities in Colorado Springs Sims flew his snowboard off a mountainside and had to be transported off the mountain by helicopter. His kidney and spleen had been lacerated and his kidney had been nearly severed. He also was a two-time All-American for Cerritos Junior College in California finishing 1st in 1998 and 2nd in 1999 at the JC tournament losing to Arsen Aleksanyan of Moorpark Junior College in the finals 2-1.

Sims worked delivering groceries for a while but defied doctors orders to start wrestling again. He went to the Olympic Trials and in the best-of-three finals, Sims beat Chris Saba of Colorado Springs, 5-2, in the first match. Saba won the second match, 4-0. Sims won the final match, 3-1 to make the Olympic team.

== Olympics ==
Sims was in Group D of the Wrestling at the 2000 Summer Olympics – Men's Greco-Roman 69 kg. Also in his group were Katsuhiko Nagata and Ruslan Biktyakov, Sims finished third in the group with three classification points and two technical points, making him 11th overall.

== Mixed Martial Arts ==
Sims is an MMA coach who has worked with fighters such as Dan Henderson, Matt Lindland, Chael Sonnen, Tarec Saffiedine and Pat Healy at Team Quest and is currently head of the wrestling program at Evolve MMA.

Sims made his MMA debut at 'Xtreme Pancration 2' in Los Angeles in April 2002, defeating Steve Bruno by decision. In total he fought 11 times in his MMA career, including five fights for Pancrase in Japan and took on top fighters of the era such as Koji Oishi, Antonio McKee, Satoru Kitaoka, Yuki Sasaki and Brad Gumm before retiring in 2006 in order to focus on his coaching commitments.

== Mixed martial arts record ==
Professional record breakdown
11 matches	5 wins	4 losses
By knockout	3	1
By submission	1	1
By decision	1	2
Draws	2	

Res.	Record	Opponent	Method	Event	Date	Round	Time	Location	Notes
Loss	5–4–2	John Cronk	Submission (guillotine choke)	ACF: Genesis	February 24, 2006	1	2:46	Denver, Colorado, United States	
Win	5–3–2	Steve Berger	TKO (cut)	SF 9: Respect	March 26, 2005	3	1:23	Oregon, United States	
Loss	4–3–2	Katsuya Inoue	TKO (punches)	Pancrase: Spiral 1	February 4, 2005	1	4:40	Tokyo, Japan	
Draw	4–2–2	Satoru Kitaoka	Draw	Pancrase: Brave 8	September 24, 2004	3	5:00	Tokyo, Japan	
Win	4–2–1	Takafumi Ito	TKO (punches)	Pancrase: 2004 Neo-Blood Tournament Final	July 25, 2004	1	3:35	Tokyo, Japan	
Win	3–2–1	Brad Gumm	Submission (punches)	SF 2: On the Move	March 19, 2004	2	3:01	Portland, Oregon	
Draw	2–2–1	Koji Oishi	Draw	Pancrase: Brave 1	February 6, 2004	3	5:00	Tokyo, Japan	
Loss	2–2	Yuki Sasaki	Decision (unanimous)	Pancrase: 10th Anniversary Show	August 31, 2003	3	5:00	Tokyo, Japan	
Loss	2–1	Antonio McKee	Decision (unanimous)	HFP 2: Hitman Fighting Productions 2	November 9, 2002	3	5:00	California, United States	
Win	2–0	Paul Gardner	TKO (punches)	RFC 1: The Beginning	July 13, 2002	3	3:23	Las Vegas, Nevada, United States	
Win	1–0	Steve Bruno	Decision	XP 2: Xtreme Pankration 2	April 12, 2002	2	5:00	Los Angeles, California, United States	
