= World Victory Road Presents: Sengoku 9 =

Mixed martial arts event

- The poster for World Victory Road Presents: Sengoku 9
- Promotion: World Victory Road
- Date: August 2, 2009
- Venue: Saitama Super Arena
- City: Saitama, Japan
- Attendance: 9,587

Event chronology
World Victory Road Presents: Sengoku 8	World Victory Road Presents: Sengoku 9	World Victory Road Presents: Sengoku 10

World Victory Road Presents: Sengoku 9 was a mixed martial arts event promoted by World Victory Road on August 2, 2009. It featured the final round of WVR's 2009 Featherweight Grand-Prix. This event was broadcast in North America via tape delay on HDNet.

== Results ==
Featherweight Grand Prix Final
Weight class				Method	Round	Time	Notes
Featherweight	Masanori Kanehara	def.	Michihiro Omigawa	Decision (Split)	3	5:00	(Note: For the Featherweight Championship.)
Non-Grand Prix bouts
Featherweight	Hatsu Hioki	def.	Masanori Kanehara	Decision (Unanimous)	3	5:00
Featherweight	Michihiro Omigawa	def.	Marlon Sandro	Decision (Split)	3	5:00
Featherweight Grand Prix reserve bout
Featherweight	Chan Sung Jung	def.	Matt Jaggers	Submission (Triangle Choke)	2	1:25
Non-Grand Prix bouts
Lightweight	Mizuto Hirota	def.	Satoru Kitaoka (c)	TKO (Knees)	4	2:50	(Note: For the Lightweight Championship.)
Middleweight	Kazuo Misaki	def.	Kazuhiro Nakamura	Technical Submission (Guillotine Choke)	1	3:03
Heavyweight	Blagoy Ivanov	def.	Kazuyuki Fujita	Decision (Split)	3	5:00
Welterweight	Dan Hornbuckle	def.	Akihiro Gono	KO (Head Kick)	3	2:50
Lightweight	Eiji Mitsuoka	def.	Clay French	Submission (Guillotine Choke)	1	1:51
Heavyweight	Yoshihiro Nakao	def.	Mu Bae Choi	Decision (Unanimous)	3	5:00
Sengoku Gold Cup finals
Featherweight	Shigeki Osawa	def.	Toru Harai	TKO (Punches)	1	4:24
Bantamweight	Ryosuke Komori	def.	Takeshi Numajiri	TKO (Punch)	1	3:25
Lightweight	Ikuo Usuda	def.	Koji Ando	Decision (Unanimous)	2	5:00

== 2009 Featherweight Grand Prix Bracket ==
First round
(Japan)	Seiya Kawahara
(Canada)	Nick Denis	W TKO
(Brazil)	Marlon Sandro	W Sub
(United States)	Matt Jaggers
(Japan)	Hideki Kadowaki
(United States)	Nam Phan	W TKO
(United States)	LC Davis
(Japan)	Michihiro Omigawa	W Dec
(Japan)	Shintaro Ishiwatari
(South Korea)	Chan Sung Jung	W Sub
(South Korea)	Jong Man Kim
(Japan)	Masanori Kanehara	W Dec
(United Kingdom)	Ronnie Mann	W Dec
(Japan)	Tetsuya Yamada
(Japan)	Hatsu Hioki	W Sub
(Puerto Rico)	Chris Manuel

Quarterfinals
(Canada)	Nick Denis
(Brazil)	Marlon Sandro	W KO
(United States)	Nam Phan
(Japan)	Michihiro Omigawa	W TKO
(South Korea)	Chan Sung Jung
(Japan)	Masanori Kanehara	W Dec
(United Kingdom)	Ronnie Mann
(Japan)	Hatsu Hioki	W Sub

Semifinals
(Brazil)	Marlon Sandro
(Japan)	Michihiro Omigawa	W Dec
(Japan)	Masanori Kanehara*
(Japan)	Hatsu Hioki	W Dec

Finals
(Japan)	Michihiro Omigawa
(Japan)	Masanori Kanehara	W Dec

- Note: Hioki was unable to continue due to a concussion and was replaced by Kanehara.

Featherweight Grand Prix Reserve Bouts:

(South Korea) Jung Chan Sung def. (United States) Matt Jaggers at Sengoku 9

== See also ==
- World Victory Road
- List of Sengoku champions
- 2009 in World Victory Road
