= Ricardo Almeida =

Brazilian-American mixed martial arts fighter

- Born: Ricardo Alves Almeida; November 29, 1976 (age 49); Weehawken, New Jersey, U.S.
- Other names: Big Dog
- Nationality: American, Brazilian
- Height: 5 ft 11 in (1.80 m)
- Weight: 170 lb (77 kg; 12 st)
- Division: Heavyweight; Light Heavyweight; Middleweight; Welterweight
- Reach: 74 in (188 cm)
- Style: Brazilian Jiu-jitsu
- Fighting out of: Robbinsville, New Jersey
- Team: Gracie Barra/Renzo Gracie Jiu-Jitsu/Ricardo Almeida BJJ
- Rank: 6th deg. BJJ black belt under Renzo Gracie
- Years active: 2000–2004; 2008–2011

Mixed martial arts record
- Total: 18
- Wins: 13
- By submission: 5
- By decision: 8
- Losses: 5
- By knockout: 1
- By submission: 1
- By decision: 2
- By disqualification: 1

Other information
- Mixed martial arts record from Sherdog

Ricardo Alves Almeida (Portuguese pronunciation: [ʁiˈkaʁdu awˈmejdɐ]; born November 29, 1976) is a Brazilian-American former mixed martial artist and current Brazilian Jiu-Jitsu grappler residing in Bordentown, New Jersey. Almeida is a veteran of the Ultimate Fighting Championship, PRIDE Fighting Championships, Grapplers Quest, and a former Middleweight King of Pancrase. In Pancrase he had notable wins over Nate Marquardt and Kazuo Misaki. Almeida trains with and teaches former UFC Lightweight Champion Frankie Edgar at his longtime Gracie system gym in Robbinsville, NJ. He also trains former UFC Lightweight champion Eddie Alvarez and The Ultimate Fighter 19 winner Corey Anderson

== Background ==
Almeida is a sixth degree black belt in Brazilian Jiu-Jitsu under Renzo Gracie, and part of the Gracie Barra combat and competition team.

== Mixed martial arts career ==
=== PRIDE ===
Almeida made his professional MMA debut on December 9, 2000, at PRIDE 12 against Akira Shoji. Almeida won his debut fight via unanimous decision.

Almeida made a one-off return to PRIDE on May 23, 2004, against Ryo Chonan at Pride:Bushido 3. Almeida won via unanimous decision.

=== UFC ===
Almeida made his UFC debut on May 4, 2001, at UFC 31 against Matt Lindland in a light heavyweight match. Referee Mario Yamasaki ended the fight in the third round after repeated illegal upkicks from Almeida, giving him a loss via disqualification.

His next fight was against Eugene Jackson on September 28, 2001, at UFC 33 in his middleweight debut. Almeida won the fight via triangle choke in the first round.

His next fight would be his last with the UFC for 6 years, fighting Andrei Semenov at UFC 35 on January 11, 2002. Almeida lost the fight via TKO in the second round after Semenov landed hard punches in his UFC debut.

Almeida left the UFC in 2002 for Pancrase.

=== Pancrase ===
In his Pancrase debut, Almeida fought Osami Shibuya on November 30, 2002, at Pancrase: Spirit 8. He won the fight via rear naked choke in the first round.

His next fight was against Ikuhisa Minowa on February 16, 2003, at Pancrase: Hybrid 2. He won the fight via unanimous decision.

His next fight was against Yuki Sasaki on April 12, 2003, at Pancrase: Hybrid 4. He won the fight via unanimous decision.

His next fight was against Kazuo Misaki on August 31, 2003, at Pancrase: 10th Anniversary Show. He won the fight via majority decision.

After winning 4 fights in a row with Pancrase, Almeida was booked for a title fight against Nate Marquardt to become the next Middleweight King Of Pancrase. They fought on November 30, 2003, at Pancrase: Hybrid 10. Almeida tackled Marquardt and was able to lock in a guillotine choke and submit Marquardt in the first round, becoming the new Middleweight King Of Pancrase. Controversy began after Almeida did not release the choke for a few seconds after Marquardt tapped and the referee stepped in. This frustrated Marquardt which caused him to throw a punch at Almeida. Almeida's cornermen intervened in the conflict, with Renzo Gracie kicking Marquardt in the face. Both men reconciled and apologised shortly after the incident.

He vacated the title in July 2004 and announced his retirement.

=== Hiatus ===
Almeida retired for a four-year period after a six-fight win streak to focus on running his Jiu-Jitsu school in Hamilton Township, Mercer County, New Jersey.

=== Return to UFC ===
Almeida came out of retirement and returned to the UFC in 2008.

His return bout in the UFC occurred at UFC 81, where he won by submitting Rob Yundt via guillotine choke at 1:08 in the first round.

Almeida's next fight was against top fighter Patrick Cote at UFC 86, where he lost a close split decision.

Almeida returned at UFC Fight Night: Condit vs. Kampmann, this time on the preliminary card, to face Matt Horwich, winning by unanimous decision.

His next fight took place on August 8 in Philadelphia against Kendall Grove at UFC 101. Almeida won by outgrappling his opponent for the majority of the bout and controlling the fight to earn a unanimous decision victory.

He was scheduled to fight Jon Fitch at UFC 106 but had to withdraw due to a knee injury suffered while training.

Almeida faced Matt Brown on March 27, 2010, at UFC 111 in his welterweight debut. Almeida defeated Brown by rear naked choke at 2:30 in round 2.

Almeida faced former UFC Welterweight Champion and UFC Hall of Famer Matt Hughes on August 7, 2010, at UFC 117 and lost via technical submission due to a Dave Schultz front headlock.

Almeida faced T. J. Grant on December 11, 2010, at UFC 124. Almeida defeated Grant by unanimous decision.

Almeida faced Mike Pyle on March 19, 2011, at UFC 128. He lost the fight via unanimous decision.

=== Retirement ===
Almeida retired for the second time on March 30, 2011, saying that he could not focus 100 percent on fighting, citing his family, his son (who was diagnosed with autism), and teaching at his academies as other areas of his life that needed attention. He added that he would continue to support the UFC and teammates such as Frankie Edgar, Kris McCray, Eddie Alvarez, and Corey Anderson.

=== MMA judge ===
A week after his retirement, Almeida became a professional MMA judge in New Jersey. On May 5, 2012, he made his major-event debut as a judge at the UFC on FOX 3 card at the Izod Center at the Meadowlands Sports Complex.

== Personal life ==
Ricardo resides between Robbinsville, New Jersey, and Sarasota, Florida, with his family. He is the head instructor and owner at Ricardo Almeida Brazilian jiu-jitsu School located in Robbinsville Township, New Jersey, and in Lakewood Ranch, Florida.

== Career accomplishments ==
=== Mixed martial arts ===
- Ultimate Fighting Championship
  - UFC Encyclopedia Awards
    - Submission of the Night (One time) vs. Eugene Jackson

=== Grappling credentials ===
ADCC Submission Wrestling World Championship

ADCC 2003 88–98 kg: 4th place

ADCC 2001 88–98 kg: 2nd place Openweight: 4th place

ADCC 2000 Openweight: 3rd place

ADCC 1999 88–98 kg: 3rd place

ADCC 1998 88–98 kg: 2nd place

CBJJ Pan American Championships

1999 Brown Belt pesado: 1st Place

CBJJ Brazilian Championships

1997 Brown Belt Pesado: 1st Place

1996 Purple Belt Médio: 1st Place Purple Belt Open Weight: 3rd Place

IBJJF Pan American No-Gi Championship

2012 Black belt Meio-Pesado: 1st Place

IBJJF No-Gi Worlds Championship

2013 Black Belt Masters: 1st Place

== Mixed martial arts record ==
Professional record breakdown
18 matches	13 wins	5 losses
By knockout	0	1
By submission	5	1
By decision	8	2
By disqualification	0	1

Res.	Record	Opponent	Method	Event	Date	Round	Time	Location	Notes
Loss	13–5	Mike Pyle	Decision (unanimous)	UFC 128	March 19, 2011	3	5:00	Newark, New Jersey, United States	
Win	13–4	T. J. Grant	Decision (unanimous)	UFC 124	December 11, 2010	3	5:00	Montreal, Quebec, Canada	
Loss	12–4	Matt Hughes	Technical Submission (anaconda choke)	UFC 117	August 7, 2010	1	3:15	Oakland, California, United States	
Win	12–3	Matt Brown	Submission (rear-naked choke)	UFC 111	March 27, 2010	2	3:30	Newark, New Jersey, United States	Welterweight debut.
Win	11–3	Kendall Grove	Decision (unanimous)	UFC 101	August 8, 2009	3	5:00	Philadelphia, Pennsylvania, United States	
Win	10–3	Matt Horwich	Decision (unanimous)	UFC Fight Night: Condit vs. Kampmann	April 1, 2009	3	5:00	Nashville, Tennessee, United States	
Loss	9–3	Patrick Côté	Decision (split)	UFC 86	July 5, 2008	3	5:00	Las Vegas, Nevada, United States	
Win	9–2	Rob Yundt	Submission (guillotine choke)	UFC 81	February 2, 2008	1	1:08	Las Vegas, Nevada, United States	
Win	8–2	Ryo Chonan	Decision (unanimous)	Pride Bushido 3	May 23, 2004	2	5:00	Yokohama, Japan	
Win	7–2	Nate Marquardt	Submission (guillotine choke)	Pancrase - Hybrid 10	November 30, 2003	1	4:53	Tokyo, Japan	Won the Pancrase Middleweight Championship.
Win	6–2	Kazuo Misaki	Decision (majority)	Pancrase - 10th Anniversary Show	August 31, 2003	3	5:00	Tokyo, Japan	Return to Middleweight.
Win	5–2	Yuki Sasaki	Decision (unanimous)	Pancrase - Hybrid 4	April 12, 2003	3	5:00	Tokyo, Japan	
Win	4–2	Ikuhisa Minowa	Decision (unanimous)	Pancrase - Hybrid 2	February 16, 2003	3	5:00	Osaka, Japan	
Win	3–2	Osami Shibuya	Submission (rear-naked choke)	Pancrase - Spirit 8	November 30, 2002	1	3:25	Yokohama, Japan	Return to Light Heavyweight.
Loss	2–2	Andrei Semenov	TKO (punches)	UFC 35	January 11, 2002	2	2:01	Uncasville, Connecticut, United States	
Win	2–1	Eugene Jackson	Submission (triangle choke)	UFC 33	September 28, 2001	1	4:06	Las Vegas, Nevada, United States	Middleweight debut.
Loss	1–1	Matt Lindland	DQ (repeated fouls)	UFC 31	May 4, 2001	3	4:21	Atlantic City, New Jersey, United States	Light Heavyweight debut.
Win	1–0	Akira Shoji	Decision (unanimous)	PRIDE 12: Cold Fury	December 9, 2000	2	5:00	Saitama, Japan	

Preceded by Nate Marquardt	Pancrase Middleweight champion November 30, 2003–November 7, 2004	Succeeded by Nate Marquardt
