= Fábio Leopoldo =

Brazilian Brazilian Jiu-Jitsu practitioner and martial artist

- Born: April 17, 1977 (age 49); São Paulo, Brazil
- Height: 6 ft 0 in (1.83 m)
- Weight: 185 lb (84 kg; 13.2 st)
- Division: Middleweight
- Fighting out of: Ventura, California, United States
- Team: Gracie Morumbi, Ryan Gracie Team
- Teachers: Ryan Gracie (formerly), Renzo Gracie, Carlos Gracie Jr
- Rank: 6th degree black belt in Brazilian Jiu-Jitsu
- Years active: 2004-2007

Mixed martial arts record
- Total: 8
- Wins: 5
- By knockout: 1
- By submission: 2
- By decision: 2
- Losses: 3
- By knockout: 2
- By submission: 1

Other information
- Website: https://www.morumbijiujitsuacademy.com
- Mixed martial arts record from Sherdog

Fábio Leopoldo Silva (born April 17, 1977 in São Paulo) is a former Brazilian mixed martial artist and is currently an active Brazilian Jiu-Jitsu practitioner and instructor.

== Career ==
After graduating college with a degree in International Business, Leopoldo started his own Brazilian Jiu-Jitsu academy in São Paulo, Brazil called Gracie Morumbi. He has been the owner and primary instructor at the academy since it was established in 1999. Since then he has opened two more academies in the United States. One is in Ventura, California, and the other is in Thousand Oaks, California.

Leopoldo is a total six-time world champion in Brazilian Jiu-Jitsu, two-time Brazilian champion, and seven-time Pan American champion. He also recently won the gold in the IBJJF International Masters.

== Brazilian Jiu-Jitsu accomplishments ==
- 4x World Champion (1998 - purple belt, 2000 – brown belt, 2002 – black belt, 2019 - black belt master division)
- 2x World Champion No Gi Master Division (2013, 2018 - black belt)
- 6x Pan American Champion (2000 – brown, 2002 weight & absolute, 2010 master, 2011 master, 2013 master, 2019 master open division)
- 2x Brazilian National Champion (2001 – black belt, 2019 - black belt)
- 2x World Silver Medalist (1998 – purple belt, 1999 – brown belt, 2008 – black belt)
- 6x Pan American Silver Medalist (1996 – purple belt, 2000 – brown belt absolute, 2001 black belt absolute, 2003, 2009 weight & absolute – master, 2019 weight division)
- Brazilian National Silver Medalist (1997 – blue belt)
- 3x World Bronze Medallist (2001 – black belt, 2003, 2005)
- 2x Pan American Bronze Medallist (1998 – purple belt, 2001 black belt)
- 3x Brazilian National Bronze Medallist (1999 – brown belt, 2000 – black belt, 2005)

== Mixed martial arts record ==
Professional record breakdown
8 matches	5 wins	3 losses
By knockout	1	2
By submission	2	1
By decision	2	0

Res.	Record	Opponent	Method	Event	Date	Round	Time	Location	Notes
Loss	5–3	Ryan McGivern	TKO (punches)	IFL: 2007 Team Championship	September 20, 2007	2	1:35	Hollywood, Florida, United States	
Loss	5–2	Brent Beauparlant	TKO (injury)	IFL – Las Vegas	June 16, 2007	3	2:22	Las Vegas, Nevada, United States	
Win	5–1	Gerald Harris	Decision (split)	IFL: Connecticut	April 13, 2007	3	4:00	Uncasville, Connecticut, United States	
Win	4–1	Chris Albandia	Submission (guillotine choke)	IFL: Atlanta	February 23, 2007	1	1:48	Atlanta, Georgia, United States	
Win	3–1	Ryan McGivern	Submission (kneebar)	IFL: Gracie vs. Miletich	September 23, 2006	2	2:49	Moline, Illinois, United States	
Loss	2–1	Matt Lindland	Submission (rear-naked choke)	Gracie Fighting Championships: Team Gracie vs Team Hammer House	March 3, 2006	3	3:25	Columbus, Ohio, United States	
Win	2–0	Yuki Sasaki	Decision (majority)	Pancrase: 2004 Neo-Blood Tournament Semifinals	July 25, 2004	3	5:00	Tokyo, Japan	
Win	1–0	Brendan Seguin	TKO (punches)	MMA: Eruption	April 30, 2004	1	0:43	Lowell, Massachusetts, United States	
