= Sanae Kikuta =

Japanese mixed martial arts fighter

Sanae Kikuta 菊田早苗
- Born: September 10, 1971 (age 55); Nerima, Tokyo, Japan
- Height: 5 ft 9 in (1.75 m)
- Weight: 178.4 lb (80.9 kg; 12.74 st)
- Division: Welterweight; Middleweight; Light Heavyweight
- Style: Judo, Seidokaikan Karate, Kickboxing, Brazilian Jiu-Jitsu, Shootfighting
- Fighting out of: Tokyo, Japan
- Teachers: Satoru Sayama; Toshihiko Koga
- Rank: 3rd Dan Black Belt in Judo; A-rank Shootist
- Years active: 1996-present

Mixed martial arts record
- Total: 44
- Wins: 31
- By knockout: 4
- By submission: 17
- By decision: 10
- Losses: 9
- By knockout: 4
- By submission: 2
- By decision: 3
- Draws: 3
- No contests: 1

Other information
- Mixed martial arts record from Sherdog

Sanae Kikuta
Medal record

Submission Wrestling

ADCC World Championship
Gold medal – first place	2001	-88kg

Sanae Kikuta (Japanese: 菊田 早苗, Kikuta Sanae; born September 10, 1971) is a Japanese mixed martial artist currently competing in the Welterweight division. A professional competitor since 1996, he has competed for the UFC, PRIDE Fighting Championships, Pancrase, DREAM, World Victory Road, DEEP, Shooto, and Vale Tudo Japan. He is the former Pancrase Light Heavyweight Champion (2001–2003) and the winner of the ADCC 88 kg class in 2001.

== Early life ==
Kikuta became a student at the Super Tiger Gym when he was in the 6th-grade elementary school, learning Shooto under Satoru Sayama, but he left the feeling that he wasn't being given enough attention in the combative aspect. Kikuta started training in Judo in his junior high school. In 1986, he won the junior high school judo Kantō tournament in the 78 kg class. In 1989, he won the championship (as a member of the Tokyo team) in the judo boys' team division at the National Athletic Meet. He also learned under Toshihiko Koga at the Nippon Sport Science University.

During his university tenure, Kikuta also tried Professional Wrestling, failing to enter New Japan Pro-Wrestling, but being accepted in Union of Wrestling Forces International and training with them for a time before leaving. After considering finding a job as a Judo teacher, Kikuta applied again to the entrance exam for NJPW, but he failed for a second time, this time due to showing dehydration symptoms during a sparring with fellow examinee Kenichi Yamamoto. Kikuta left college and went to train Kickboxing under Stan Longinidis in Australia. Upon his return to Japan, Kikuta started training at Seidokaikan and won the All Japan amateur Shootboxing heavyweight championship. However, after watching Royce Gracie win the first Ultimate Fighting Championship events, he became interested in Mixed Martial Arts.

== Mixed martial arts career ==
Kikuta had his MMA debut for the first tournament hosted in 1996 by Lumax Cup, which featured the use of keikogi. Kikuta won after beating Egan Inoue and Masanori Suda. He then went to compete in the Vale Tudo Japan event, but was defeated by Mushtaq Abdullah by forearm choke. After returning to Lumax Cup, he won the 1997 tournament, too, defeating Suda again.

=== PRIDE Fighting Championships ===
Kikuta made his worldwide MMA debut for the PRIDE promotion at its second event, where he faced Brazilian jiu-jitsu expert Renzo Gracie in a special rules match. The fight turned out to be a slow, methodical bout which lasted six fifteen minutes rounds, whose end saw Renzo submitting Kikuta via guillotine choke at the sixth one.

Kikuta returned to PRIDE to face Takada Dojo understudy Daijiro Matsui. Again, the fight was a technical battle, ending with a draw after none of the fighters could finish the other.

At PRIDE 20, Kikuta fought Alexander Otsuka. This time the fight was a controversial one, with Otsuka throwing several knees to the groin which weren't penalized. Despite so, Sanae controlled the match with dominant positions and soccer kicks, and won by unanimous decision.

At UFO Legend, Kikuta fought PRIDE competitor Antonio Rodrigo Nogueira. The two grappling specialists exchanged assaults on the ground, with the Brazilian taking down Kikuta and attacking his half guard before the Japanese capitalized on a failed calf slicer to switch positions. Kikuta pressed from the top, but Nogueira regained full guard and scrambled to switch positions again, where the Japanese defended again from half guard. At the second round, Kikuta looked to take the match to the ground again, but it took a sudden twist when Nogueira landed a surprising right hook, knocking Sanae out completely. Nogueira was declared the winner.

Sanae fought again for PRIDE in the event Shockwave 2005, taking on Makoto Takimoto, judo gold medalist and apprentice to Hidehiko Yoshida. Kikuta opened the fight pulling guard, after which the two judoka traded positions and submission attempts with Sanae coming over in most of them. Having maintained the advantage for all of the three rounds both standing and on the ground, Kikuta was given the unanimous decision win.

=== Pancrase ===
After a single match for Shooto, Kikuta joined the Pancrase fighting organization in April 1994. He scored big victories over veterans Minoru Suzuki and Ryushi Yanagisawa, and shortly after he founded the Grabaka team along with Genki Sudo, Eiji Ishikawa and Hiroo Matsunaga. Kikuta also participated in the ADCC Submission Wrestling World Championship in April 2001 and won its 88 kg class. In September 2001 he won the title of Pancrase Light Heavyweight Champion.

He currently runs the Grabaka gym in Nakano, Tokyo, which trains fighters such as Kazunori Yokota, Akihiro Gono, and formerly Genki Sudo, and Kazuo Misaki.

=== Ultimate Fighting Championship ===
In his sole apparition for Ultimate Fighting Championship, Kikuta took part in the event Ultimate Japan III in April 2000. He defeated Eugene Jackson in dominant fashion, taking him down and locking an armbar for the submission.

=== World Victory Road ===
On January 4, 2009, at World Victory Road Presents: Sengoku Rebellion 2009, Kikuta faced fellow judoka Hidehiko Yoshida. The bout started characteristically slow, with Kikuta taking Yoshida down and tentatively exchanging strikes with him. At the second round, Kikuta opted for pulling guard and pursuing an ankle lock, but Yoshida remained on top and landed several punches through his guard. Afterwards, however, Kikuta reversed and got the mount, unloading ground and pound until the end of the round. The third round saw Yoshida stunning Kikuta with a punch and scoring a judo throw, but Sanae took his back and kept striking on him for the rest of the match, eventually winning the decision.

== Championships and accomplishments ==
=== Grappling ===
- Abu Dhabi Combat Club
  - ADCC 2001 88 kg class winner (April 2001)

=== Judo ===
- Kantō region Judo Middleweight winner
- The National Athletic High School Meeting, Judo 86 kg class Winner

=== Mixed martial arts ===
- Lumax Cup
  - Tournament of J'96 Winner
  - Tournament of J'97 Winner
- Pancrase
  - Pancrase Light heavyweight Champion (One time)
- Tokyo Sports
  - Technique Award (2001)

=== Shootboxing ===
- Japan Shootboxing Association
  - All Japan Amateur Shoot boxing Championship Heavyweight Winner

== Mixed martial arts record ==
Professional record breakdown
44 matches	31 wins	9 losses
By knockout	4	4
By submission	17	2
By decision	10	3
Draws	3	
No contests	1	

Res.	Record	Opponent	Method	Event	Date	Round	Time	Location	Notes
Loss	31–9–3 (1)	Song Kenan	Decision (unanimous)	Real Fighting Championship: Real 1	December 23, 2014	3	5:00	Tokyo, Japan	Return to Welterweight.
Win	31–8–3 (1)	Masayuki Naruse	Submission (armbar)	Grabaka Live 3	October 27, 2013	1	2:25	Tokyo, Japan	Openweight bout.
Loss	30–8–3 (1)	Yuji Sakuragi	KO (knee and soccer kick)	Grabaka Live 2	October 27, 2012	1	0:35	Tokyo, Japan	Light Heavyweight bout.
Win	30–7–3 (1)	Kenichi Yamamoto	TKO (punches)	Grabaka Live: 1st Cage Attack	October 15, 2011	1	2:18	Tokyo, Japan	
Win	29–7–3 (1)	Lee Sak Kim	TKO (corner stoppage)	DEEP: 50 Impact	October 24, 2010	1	1:21	Tokyo, Japan	Catchweight (79 kg) bout.
Loss	28–7–3 (1)	Yasubey Enomoto	TKO (punches)	World Victory Road Presents: Sengoku Raiden Championships 13	June 20, 2010	1	3:57	Tokyo, Japan	
Win	28–6–3 (1)	Hidehiko Yoshida	Decision (split)	World Victory Road Presents: Sengoku no Ran 2009	January 4, 2009	3	5:00	Saitama, Japan	Return to Light Heavyweight.
Win	27–6–3 (1)	Chris Rice	Submission (armbar)	World Victory Road Presents: Sengoku 3	June 8, 2008	2	3:54	Saitama, Japan	Middleweight bout.
Win	26–6–3 (1)	Jean-François Lénogue	Decision (unanimous)	PRIDE: Bushido 13	November 5, 2006	2	5:00	Yokohama, Japan	
Win	25–6–3 (1)	Makoto Takimoto	Decision (unanimous)	PRIDE Shockwave 2005	December 31, 2005	3	5:00	Saitama, Japan	
Win	24–6–3 (1)	Webster Dauphiney	Submission (achilles lock)	Pancrase: Brave 10	November 7, 2004	1	2:14	Urayasu, Japan	
Win	23–6–3 (1)	Keith Rockel	Decision (majority)	Pancrase: Brave 4	April 23, 2004	3	5:00	Tokyo, Japan	
Loss	22–6–3 (1)	Yuki Kondo	KO (punch)	Pancrase: Hybrid 10	November 30, 2003	3	0:08	Tokyo, Japan	Lost the Pancrase Light Heavyweight Championship.
Win	22–5–3 (1)	Elvis Sinosic	Decision (unanimous)	Pancrase: 10th Anniversary Show	August 31, 2003	3	5:00	Tokyo, Japan	
Draw	21–5–3 (1)	Yuki Kondo	Draw	Pancrase: Hybrid 5	May 18, 2003	3	5:00	Yokohama, Japan	Retained the Pancrase Light Heavyweight Championship.
Win	21–5–2 (1)	Eduardo Pamplona	Decision (unanimous)	Pancrase: Spirit 8	November 20, 2002	3	5:00	Tokyo, Japan	
Loss	20–5–2 (1)	Antônio Rodrigo Nogueira	KO (punch)	UFO: Legend	August 8, 2002	2	0:29	Tokyo, Japan	
Win	20–4–2 (1)	Alexander Otsuka	Decision (unanimous)	PRIDE 20	April 28, 2002	3	5:00	Yokohama, Japan	
Win	19–4–2 (1)	Daisuke Watanabe	Submission (arm-triangle choke)	Pancrase: Proof 7	December 1, 2001	1	2:14	Yokohama, Japan	
Win	18–4–2 (1)	Ikuhisa Minowa	TKO (cut)	Pancrase: 2001 Anniversary Show	September 20, 2001	2	4:30	Yokohama, Japan	Won the vacant Pancrase Light Heavyweight Championship.
Win	17–4–2 (1)	Pshemek Wallace	TKO (punches)	DEEP: 2nd Impact	August 18, 2001	1	1:52	Yokohama, Japan	
Win	16–4–2 (1)	Matt Trihey	Submission (armbar)	Pancrase: Proof 4	June 26, 2001	1	1:11	Tokyo, Japan	
NC	15–4–2 (1)	Alex Stiebling	No Contest (Kikuta was cut by an accidental headbutt)	Pancrase: Proof 1	February 4, 2001	1	3:11	Tokyo, Japan	
Win	15–4–2	Kazuo Takahashi	Submission (arm-triangle choke)	Pancrase: Trans 7	December 4, 2000	1	7:22	Tokyo, Japan	
Loss	14–4–2	Murilo Bustamante	Decision (unanimous)	Pancrase: Trans 6	October 31, 2000	1	15:00	Tokyo, Japan	
Win	14–3–2	Ichio Matsubara	Submission (armlock)	Pancrase: Trans 4	June 26, 2000	1	2:13	Tokyo, Japan	
Win	13–3–2	Eugene Jackson	Submission (armbar)	UFC 25	April 14, 2000	1	4:38	Tokyo, Japan	
Win	12–3–2	Ryushi Yanagisawa	Decision (unanimous)	Pancrase: Trans 2	February 27, 2000	1	15:00	Osaka, Japan	
Win	11–3–2	Minoru Suzuki	TKO (arm-triangle choke)	Pancrase: Breakthrough 11	December 18, 1999	1	2:39	Yokohama, Japan	
Draw	10–3–2	Travis Fulton	Draw	Pancrase: Breakthrough 9	October 25, 1999	1	15:00	Tokyo, Japan	
Win	10–3–1	Eddy Millis	Submission (punches)	Pancrase: 1999 Anniversary Show	September 18, 1999	1	1:57	Urayasu, Japan	
Win	9–3–1	Takafumi Ito	Decision (unanimous)	Pancrase: Breakthrough 7	July 6, 1999	2	3:00	Tokyo, Japan	
Win	8–3–1	Eric Gedek	Submission (rear-naked choke)	Pancrase: Breakthrough 6	June 11, 1999	3	1:20	Tokyo, Japan	
Loss	7–3–1	Paul Jones	Decision (unanimous)	Shooto: Las Grandes Viajes 6	November 27, 1998	3	5:00	Tokyo, Japan	
Draw	7–2–1	Daijiro Matsui	Draw (time limit)	PRIDE 4	October 11, 1998	3	10:00	Tokyo, Japan	
Loss	7–2	Renzo Gracie	Submission (guillotine choke)	PRIDE 2	March 15, 1998	6	0:43	Yokohama, Japan	
Win	7–1	Masanori Suda	Submission (armbar)	Lumax Cup: Tournament of J '97 Heavyweight Tournament	July 27, 1997	1	3:59	Japan	Won Lumax Cup: Tournament of J '97 Heavyweight Tournament.
Win	6–1	Toshinobu Komeya	Submission (achilles lock)	Lumax Cup: Tournament of J '97 Heavyweight Tournament	July 27, 1997	1	1:00	Japan	
Win	5–1	Jun Kitagawa	Submission (achilles lock)	Lumax Cup: Tournament of J '97 Heavyweight Tournament	July 27, 1997	1	3:14	Japan	
Loss	4–1	Mushtaq Abdullah	Submission (forearm choke)	VTJ 1996: Vale Tudo Japan 1996	July 7, 1996	1	6:27	Tokyo, Japan	
Win	4–0	Masanori Suda	Submission (heel hook)	Lumax Cup: Tournament of J '96	March 30, 1996	1	1:15	Japan	Won Lumax Cup: Tournament of J '96.
Win	3–0	Hiroyuki Yoshioka	Submission (heel hook)	Lumax Cup: Tournament of J '96	March 30, 1996	1	3:05	Japan	
Win	2–0	Egan Inoue	Decision	Lumax Cup: Tournament of J '96	March 30, 1996	1	5:00	Japan	
Win	1–0	Saburo Kawakatsu	Submission (keylock)	Lumax Cup: Tournament of J '96	March 30, 1996	1	2:04	Japan	

=== Mixed martial arts exhibition record ===
Exhibition record breakdown		
1 match	0 wins	0 losses
By knockout	0	0
By submission	0	0
By decision	0	0
Draws	1	

Res.	Record	Opponent	Method	Event	Date	Round	Time	Location	Notes
Draw	0-0-1	Manabu Yamada	Technical Draw	DEEP 2001	January 8, 2001	1	3:00	Tokyo, Japan	

== Submission grappling record ==
KO PUNCHES

Result	Opponent	Method	Event	Date	Round	Time	Notes
Loss	(Brazil) Renzo Gracie	Points	ADCC 2017 –88 kg	2017	Overtime		
Draw	(Japan) Minoru Suzuki and (Japan) Daiju Takase	Draw	The Contenders X-Rage Vol.1	December 14, 2001	1	15:00	Partnered with (Japan) Takeshi Yamazaki
Win	(Brazil) Saulo Ribeiro	Points	ADCC 2001 –88 kg	2001			
Win	(Japan) Egan Inoue		ADCC 2001 –88 kg	2001			
Win	(United States) Chris Brown		ADCC 2001 –88 kg	2001			
Win	(United States) Evan Tanner		ADCC 2001 –88 kg	2001			
Loss	(Brazil) Rigan Machado	Points	ADCC 1999 –99 kg	1999	1	10:00	

== See also ==
- List of male mixed martial artists
