= Eric Lawson =

American mixed martial arts fighter

- Born: February 12, 1981 (age 45); Concord, California, United States
- Height: 6 ft 0 in (1.83 m)
- Weight: 185 lb (84 kg; 13.2 st)
- Division: Middleweight
- Fighting out of: Concord, California, United States
- Team: Combat Fitness
- Years active: 2004–2011

Mixed martial arts record
- Total: 14
- Wins: 9
- By knockout: 2
- By submission: 5
- By decision: 2
- Losses: 5
- By knockout: 1
- By submission: 4

Other information
- Mixed martial arts record from Sherdog

Eric Lawson (born February 12, 1981) is an American mixed martial artist, who is perhaps best known for his fight stint with now-defunct promotion Strikeforce. A professional mixed martial arts since 2004, Lawson holds a record of 9–5.

== Mixed martial arts career ==
Lawson made his professional mixed martial arts debut on February 12, 2004, when he defeated Brandon Gallo via rear-naked choke submission at Gladiator Challenge 22. Following this, Lawson would compile a record of 3–1 before making his first appearance for now-defunct promotion Strikeforce.

=== Strikeforce ===
In his first appearance in the promotion, Lawson faced Josh Neal at Strikeforce: Four Men Enter, One Man Survives on November 16, 2007. He won the fight via rear-naked choke submission. After compiling a 1–1 record outside Strikeforce, Lawson signed a new contract with the promotion, and faced Jesse Gillespie at Strikeforce: Melendez vs. Thomson on June 27, 2008. He won the fight via rear-naked choke.

He then faced Kenneth Seegrist at Strikeforce: At The Mansion II on September 20, 2008, winning the fight via rear-naked choke, his third straight rear-naked choke submission in the organization.

Lawson faced Tony Johnson at Strikeforce: Destruction on November 21, 2008. He won the fight via rear-naked choke, moving to 4–0 inside the promotion.

For his fifth fight inside Strikeforce, Lawson faced Waylon Kennell at Strikeforce: Shamrock vs. Diaz on April 11, 2009. He won the fight via first-round TKO.

Lawson faced Wayne Phillips at Strikeforce Challengers: Kaufman vs. Hashi on February 26, 2010. He lost the fight via armbar submission. He then faced Ron Keslar at Strikeforce: Diaz vs. Cyborg on January 29, 2011. He lost the fight via armbar, and was subsequently released from the promotion.

=== Post-Strikeforce Career ===
After being released from Strikeforce in late 2011, Lawson faced Mauricio Alonso at Dragon House 8 on November 18, 2011. He lost the fight via triangle choke.

== Mixed martial arts record ==
Professional record breakdown
| 14 matches | 9 wins | 5 losses |
| By knockout | 2 | 1 |
| By submission | 5 | 4 |
| By decision | 2 | 0 |

| Res. | Record | Opponent | Method | Event | Date | Round | Time | Location | Notes |
|---|---|---|---|---|---|---|---|---|---|
| Loss | 9–5 | Mauricio Alonso | Submission (triangle choke) | DH: Dragon's House 8 | November 18, 2011 | 2 | 1:38 | San Francisco, California, United States | |
| Loss | 9–4 | Ron Keslar | Submission (armbar) | Strikeforce: Diaz vs. Cyborg | January 29, 2011 | 1 | 1:57 | San Jose, California, United States | |
| Loss | 9–3 | Wayne Philips | Submission (armbar) | Strikeforce Challengers: Kaufman vs. Hashi | February 26, 2010 | 1 | 4:47 | San Jose, California, United States | |
| Win | 9–2 | Waylon Kennell | TKO (punches) | Strikeforce: Shamrock vs. Diaz | April 11, 2009 | 1 | 4:54 | San Jose, California, United States | |
| Win | 8–2 | Tony Johnson | Submission (rear-naked choke) | Strikeforce: Destruction | November 21, 2008 | 1 | 1:28 | San Jose, California, United States | |
| Win | 7–2 | Kenneth Seegrist | Submission (rear-naked choke) | Strikeforce: At The Mansion II | September 20, 2008 | 1 | 3:07 | Beverly Hills, California, United States | |
| Win | 6–2 | Jesse Gillespie | Submission (rear-naked choke) | Strikeforce: Melendez vs. Thomson | June 27, 2008 | 1 | 1:03 | San Jose, California, United States | |
| Win | 5–2 | Marcus Gaines | Decision (unanimous) | GC 75: Erin-Go-BRAWL | March 15, 2008 | 3 | 5:00 | San Francisco, California, United States | |
| Loss | 4–2 | Raul Castillo | TKO (punches) | GC 7: Seasons Beatings | December 8, 2007 | 2 | 2:23 | San Francisco, California, United States | |
| Win | 4–1 | Josh Neal | Submission (rear-naked choke) | Strikeforce: Four Men Enter, One Man Survives | November 16, 2007 | 2 | 0:20 | San Jose, California, United States | |
| Win | 3–1 | Chris Werner | KO (punches) | GC 66: Battle Ground | July 27, 2007 | 1 | N/A | San Francisco, California, United States | |
| Loss | 2–1 | Nik Theotikos | Submission (triangle choke) | GC 61: Chaos at Kezar | March 31, 2007 | 2 | 2:46 | San Francisco, California, United States | |
| Win | 2–0 | Attila Bordor | Decision | GC 36: Proving Grounds | April 9, 2005 | 2 | 5:00 | San Francisco, California, United States | |
| Win | 1–0 | Brandon Gallo | Submission (rear-naked choke) | GC 22: Gladiator Challenge 22 | February 12, 2004 | 2 | 1:00 | San Francisco, California, United States | |
