= Strikeforce: Four Men Enter, One Man Survives =

Strikeforce mixed martial arts event in 2007

- The poster for Strikeforce: Four Men Enter, One Man Survives
- Promotion: Strikeforce
- Date: November 16, 2007
- Venue: HP Pavilion at San Jose
- City: San Jose, California
- Attendance: 7,249

Event chronology
Strikeforce: Playboy Mansion	Strikeforce: Four Men Enter, One Man Survives	Strikeforce: Young Guns II

Strikeforce: Four Men Enter, One Man Survives (also called the Strikeforce Tournament Series) was a mixed martial arts event held at the HP Pavilion in San Jose, California on November 16, 2007. The event was hosted by Strikeforce in conjunction with bodogFight, and was streamed live on Yahoo! Sports. The event held two distinctions in that: 1) it contained the first MMA tournament sanctioned by the California State Athletic Commission and 2) Strikeforce's heavyweight champion was determined during the event in a non-tournament fight.

== Tournament Rules ==
The tournament was a four-man, single-elimination tournament. Each bracket consisted of two five-minute rounds, with a third round being fought in the case of a tie.

=== Results ===
Main Card
Weight class				Method	Round	Time	Notes
Heavyweight	Alistair Overeem	def.	Paul Buentello	TKO (Submission to knees to the body)	2	3:42	(Note: For the Strikeforce Heavyweight Championship.)
Middleweight	Cung Le	def.	Sammy Morgan	TKO (body kick)	3	1:58
Middleweight Tournament Final
Middleweight	Jorge Santiago	def.	Trevor Prangley	TKO (knee to the body)	1	2:31
Middleweight Tournament Semi-finals
Middleweight	Trevor Prangley	def.	Falaniko Vitale	Decision (referee decision)	2	2:12
Middleweight	Jorge Santiago	def.	Sean Salmon	KO (flying knee)	1	0:24
Preliminary card
Middleweight	Lemont Davis	def.	Brian Schwartz	Decision (unanimous)	3	5:00
Light Heavyweight	Anthony Ruiz	def.	Bobby Southworth	TKO (doctor stoppage)	2	0:52
Welterweight	Luke Stewart	def.	Bryson Kamaka	KO (knee)	1	0:19
Middleweight	Eric Lawson	def.	Josh Neal	Submission (rear-naked choke)	2	0:20
Bantamweight	Anthony Figueroa	def.	Peter Sabala	Decision (split)	3	5:00
Lightweight	Alex Crispin	def.	Clint Coronel	Decision (unanimous)	3	5:00
Featherweight	Chris Drumm	vs.	Evan Esguerra	NC (punch to back of the head)	2	2:35
Middleweight	Dennis Hallman	def.	Jeremiah Metcalf	Submission (heel hook)	1	1:39

== Middleweight Tournament Results ==
Semifinals
(Brazil)	Jorge Santiago	W
(United States)	Sean Salmon
(United States)	Falaniko Vitale
(South Africa)	Trevor Prangley	W

Final
(Brazil)	Jorge Santiago	W
(South Africa)	Trevor Prangley

== See also ==
- Strikeforce
- List of Strikeforce champions
- List of Strikeforce events
- 2007 in Strikeforce
