= Ron Keslar =

American mixed martial arts fighter (born 1980)

- Born: April 17, 1980 (age 46); McClellandtown, Pennsylvania, United States
- Nationality: American
- Height: 6 ft 0 in (1.83 m)
- Weight: 170 lb (77 kg; 12 st 2 lb)
- Division: Welterweight; Middleweight
- Reach: 74 in (188 cm)
- Fighting out of: San Jose, California, United States
- Team: American Kickboxing Academy
- Rank: Black belt in Brazilian Jiu-jitsu under Dave Camarillo
- Years active: 2006–2016

Mixed martial arts record
- Total: 20
- Wins: 11
- By knockout: 1
- By submission: 5
- By decision: 5
- Losses: 9
- By knockout: 4
- By submission: 2
- By decision: 3

Other information
- Mixed martial arts record from Sherdog

Ron Keslar (born April 17, 1980) is an American former mixed martial artist currently competing in the Welterweight division. A professional competitor since 2006, he has also formerly competed for Bellator, Strikeforce and King of the Cage.

== Background ==
Born and raised in McClellandtown, Pennsylvania, Keslar competed in wrestling at Albert Gallatin High School and Mount Pleasant Area Junior/Senior High School.

== Mixed martial arts career ==
=== Early career ===
Keslar made his professional debut in early 2006 and compiled a record of 5–1 before being signed by Strikeforce.

=== Strikeforce ===
Keslar made his promotional debut against Chris Cope on June 26, 2010, at Strikeforce: Fedor vs. Werdum and lost via TKO in the second round.

He made his return at Strikeforce: Diaz vs. Noons II on October 9, 2010, against Josh McDonald and lost via unanimous decision.

Keslar's next appearance for the promotion was on January 29, 2011, at Strikeforce: Diaz vs. Cyborg against Eric Lawson. Keslar won via armbar submission in the first round.

=== Bellator MMA ===
After his last appearance in Strikeforce, Keslar compiled a record of 3-0 and was signed by Bellator. He made his promotional debut on September 20, 2013, at Bellator 100 against Luis Melo and won via split decision.

Keslar faced controversial fighter War Machine at Bellator 104 on October 18, 2013. He won the fight via technical submission in the first round.

Keslar faced Rick Hawn in the Bellator Season Nine Welterweight Tournament Final. He lost the fight via knockout in the third round.

Keslar faced Karo Parisyan on April 11, 2014, at Bellator 116. Despite winning the first round, he lost the fight via knockout in the second round.

Keslar faced Jesse Juarez on September 19, 2014, at Bellator 125. He lost the fight via unanimous decision.

=== League S-70 ===
Keslar faced Alexey Kunchenko on August 29, 2015, at League S-70: Russia vs. World. He lost via KO (punches).

=== Coach activity ===
Ron Keslar is head jiu-jitsu coach at American Kickboxing Academy

== Championships and accomplishments ==
- Bellator MMA
  - Bellator Season Nine Welterweight Tournament Runner-Up

== Mixed martial arts record ==
Professional record breakdown
20 matches	11 wins	9 losses
By knockout	1	5
By submission	5	2
By decision	5	2

Res.	Record	Opponent	Method	Event	Date	Round	Time	Location	Notes
Loss	11–9	Danasabe Mohammed	Submission (guillotine choke)	Dragon House 22	February 6, 2016	2	0:49	San Francisco, California, United States	
Loss	11–8	Alexey Kunchenko	KO (punches)	League S-70: Russia vs. World	August 29, 2015	3	3:27	Sochi, Russia	
Loss	11–7	Jesse Juarez	Decision (unanimous)	Bellator 125	September 19, 2014	3	5:00	Fresno, California, United States	
Loss	11–6	Karo Parisyan	KO (punches)	Bellator 116	April 11, 2014	2	4:05	Temecula, California, United States	
Loss	11–5	Rick Hawn	KO (punch)	Bellator 109	November 22, 2013	3	0:55	Bethlehem, Pennsylvania, United States	Bellator Season Nine Welterweight Tournament Final
Win	11–4	War Machine	Technical submission (rear-naked choke)	Bellator 104	October 18, 2013	1	3:31	Cedar Rapids, Iowa, United States	Bellator Season Nine Welterweight Tournament Semifinal
Win	10–4	Luis Melo	Decision (split)	Bellator 100	September 20, 2013	3	5:00	Phoenix, Arizona, United States	Bellator Season Nine Welterweight Tournament Quarterfinal
Loss	9–4	Chris Curtis	Decision (unanimous)	MMA Xtreme: Fists Will Fly	August 24, 2013	3	5:00	Evansville, Indiana, United States	
Win	9–3	Dominic Waters	Decision (unanimous)	JW Events: Up and Comers 10	May 19, 2012	3	5:00	Stockton, California, United States	
Win	8–3	James Chaney	TKO (doctor stoppage)	Impact MMA: Recognition	December 10, 2011	1	5:00	Pleasanton, California, United States	
Win	7–3	Felipe Fologin	Decision (split)	TWC 11: Inferno	June 17, 2011	3	5:00	Porterville, California, United States	
Win	6–3	Eric Lawson	Submission (armbar)	Strikeforce: Diaz vs. Cyborg	January 29, 2011	1	1:57	San Jose, California, United States	
Loss	5–3	Josh McDonald	Decision (unanimous)	Strikeforce: Diaz vs. Noons II	October 9, 2010	3	5:00	San Jose, California, United States	
Loss	5–2	Chris Cope	TKO (head kick and punches)	Strikeforce: Fedor vs. Werdum	June 26, 2010	2	4:32	San Jose, California, United States	
Win	5–1	Jonathan Brandon	Submission (rear-naked choke)	KOTC: Arrival	February 25, 2010	2	0:34	Highland, California, United States	
Win	4–1	Darrin Freeman	Decision (unanimous)	War Gods/Ken Shamrock Productions: The Valentine's Eve Massacre	February 13, 2009	3	3:00	Fresno, California, United States	
Win	3–1	Kris Bien	Decision (unanimous)	UF: Unleashed Fight	October 11, 2008	3	5:00	Alpine, California, United States	
Win	2–1	Michael Musslewhite	Submission (guillotine choke)	IFBL: Fight Night 9	September 15, 2007	1	0:41	Niles, Ohio, United States	
Loss	1–1	Matt Major	Submission (armbar)	IFBL: Fight Night 7	May 5, 2007	1	3:48	Niles, Ohio, United States	
Win	1–0	Shane Carey	Submission (rear-naked choke)	IFBL: Fight Night 5	December 16, 2006	1	0:31	Niles, Ohio, United States	

== Submission grappling record ==
? Matches, ? Wins, ? Losses, ? Draws
Result	Rec.	Opponent	Method	Event	Date	Location
Win	3–4–0	(Brazil) Rhalan Gracie	Decision (split)	Fight 2 Win Pro 94	November 17, 2018	
Win	2–4–0	(United States) Nick Greene	Decision (split)	Fight 2 Win Pro 76	June 8, 2018	
Win	1–4–0	(United States) Dominiqueh Hoskins	Decision	Fight 2 Win Pro 62	February 11, 2018	
Loss	0–4–0	(United States) Keenan Cornelius	DQ	2017 Los Angeles National Pro (110 kg)	September 23, 2017	
Loss	0–3–0	(United States) Keenan Cornelius	Armbar	2017 Los Angeles National Pro (94 kg)	September 23, 2017	
Loss	0–2–0	(Brazil) Lucas Barbosa	Decision	2017 IBJJF San Jose Summer Open	July 29, 2017	
Loss	0–1–0	(United States) Ahmed White	Collar choke	Fight two Win pro 23	January 27, 2017	
