= Falaniko Vitale =

American mixed martial arts fighter

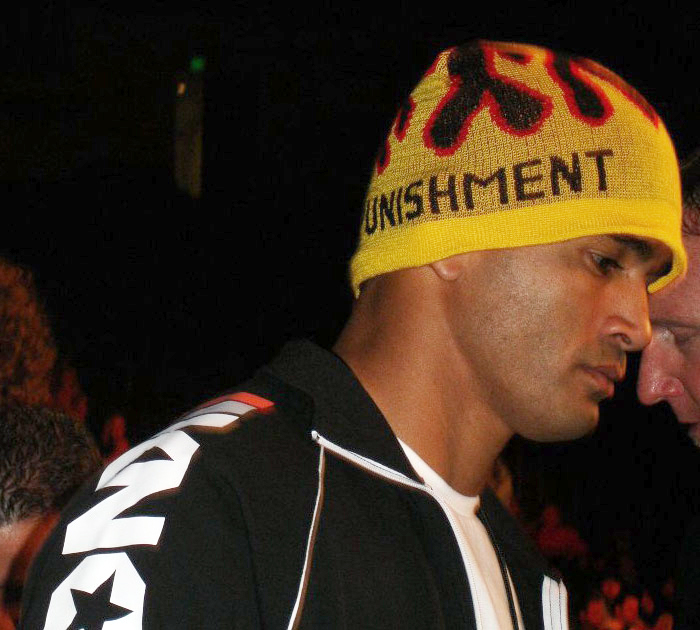
- Born: July 14, 1974 (age 52); Honolulu, Hawaii, United States
- Other names: Niko
- Height: 5 ft 10 in (1.78 m)
- Weight: 185 lb (84 kg; 13.2 st)
- Division: Light Heavyweight; Middleweight
- Fighting out of: Honolulu, Hawaii, United States
- Team: Grappling Unlimited; 808 Fight Team
- Years active: 1999–2014

Mixed martial arts record
- Total: 41
- Wins: 30
- By knockout: 14
- By submission: 12
- By decision: 4
- Losses: 11
- By knockout: 5
- By submission: 3
- By decision: 3

Other information
- Mixed martial arts record from Sherdog

Falaniko "Niko" Vitale is a retired American mixed martial artist. He competed in the Middleweight division and has fought in the UFC, Bellator, Strikeforce, the IFL, and King of the Cage. He is a former SuperBrawl Middleweight Champion, and also won the X-1 Middleweight Tournament.

== Background ==
Vitale was born in Honolulu, Hawaii and is a native of Waipahu, Hawaii. He is of mixed Samoan, Chinese, German, and Portuguese descent. He graduated from Waipahu High School and was a star defensive back in football, going on to play for the University of Hawaii.

== Mixed martial arts career ==
=== Early career ===
Vitale made his professional debut in 1999 against future UFC veteran Aaron Riley and won via TKO. Vitale would then go on to win his next three fights, his fourth career bout being his King of the Cage debut, before being handed his first professional loss by Japanese fighter Yasuhito Namekawa by a guillotine choke submission in the RINGS organization. He compiled a career record of 13–2 with only one fight outside of his Hawaii (his King of the Cage debut in California) before making his UFC debut.

=== UFC ===
Vitale made his UFC debut at UFC 43 against Olympic wrestler Matt Lindland in Nevada and won in a spectacular and very unusual slam knockout in which Lindland attempted to slam Vitale but landed on his own head knocking himself out. Vitale then mounted Lindland and the referee stopped the match. Two fights later, the two would have a rematch at UFC 45, which would result in a loss for Vitale after he submitted due to strikes.

=== Post-UFC ===
In his next fight Vitale bounced back with a win over former UFC Middleweight Champion Dave Menne via unanimous decision. Two fights later, Vitale defeated future UFC veteran Yushin Okami via split decision.

Vitale had a five-fight winning streak before losing three consecutive fights to Robbie Lawler, Jason "Mayhem" Miller, and then lost in the rematch with Lawler.

Vitale bounced back with a win but then lost again in his IFL debut in Oakland, California against Jeremy Horn via split decision.

=== Strikeforce ===
Three fights after his loss to Horn, Vitale made his Strikeforce debut, winning after his opponent submitted due to strikes. In his next fight under the Strikeforce banner, Vitale lost to Trevor Prangley via referee decision. Three fights later, Vitale returned in a bout against Frank Trigg which he lost via unanimous decision.

=== Bellator ===
On January 28, 2011, Vitale signed a long-term deal with Bellator. He lost his debut fight against former Middleweight Champion Hector Lombard in a non-title fight.

=== King of the Cage ===
Vitale would return over a year later against Elmer Waterhen at KOTC - Ali'is on July 14, 2012. Vitale won via TKO in the first round.

Vitale faced Jaime Jara at X-1 - Jara vs. Vitale on September 26, 2014. He lost the bout via second-round submission and subsequently retired from mixed martial arts.

== Personal life ==
Vitale is married and has four children. He and his family are Christians.

== Mixed martial arts record ==
Professional record breakdown
41 matches	30 wins	11 losses
By knockout	14	5
By submission	12	3
By decision	4	3

Res.	Record	Opponent	Method	Event	Date	Round	Time	Location	Notes
Loss	30–11	Jaime Jara	Submission (rear-naked choke)	X-1: Jara vs. Vitale	September 26, 2014	2	N/A	Honolulu, Hawaii, United States	
Win	30–10	Elmer Waterhen	TKO (punches)	KOTC: Ali'is	July 14, 2012	1	3:36	Honolulu, Hawaii, United States	
Loss	29–10	Hector Lombard	KO (punch)	Bellator 44	May 14, 2011	3	0:54	Atlantic City, New Jersey, United States	
Win	29–9	Dylan Clay	KO (punch)	X-1 Events: Champions III	March 12, 2011	1	3:04	Hawaii, United States	Won the X-1 Middleweight Championship.
Win	28–9	Kala Hose	Submission (ezekiel choke)	X-1 Events: Heroes	September 11, 2010	4	2:26	Hawaii, United States	
Win	27–9	Kalib Starnes	Submission (ezekiel choke)	X-1 Events: Champions II	March 20, 2010	1	2:22	Hawaii, United States	
Loss	26–9	Frank Trigg	Decision (unanimous)	Strikeforce: Payback	October 3, 2008	3	5:00	Colorado, United States	
Win	26–8	Ricky Shivers	TKO (cut)	X-1 Events: Champions	January 26, 2008	1	0:49	Hawaii, United States	Won the X-1 Middleweight Tournament.
Win	25–8	Joey Guel	Decision (unanimous)	X-1 Events: Champions	January 26, 2008	3		Hawaii, United States	
Loss	24–8	Trevor Prangley	Decision (referee decision)	Strikeforce: Four Men Enter, One Man Survives	November 16, 2007	2	2:12	California, United States	
Win	24–7	Ron Fields	Submission (strikes)	Strikeforce: Playboy Mansion	September 29, 2007	1	3:02	California, United States	Catchweight (195 lbs) bout.
Win	23–7	Steve Renaud	Submission (strikes)	X-1: Grand Prix 2007	August 4, 2007	1	0:43	Hawaii, United States	
Win	22–7	Mavrick Harvey	TKO (submission to strikes)	X-1: Extreme Fighting 2	March 17, 2007	1	2:41	Hawaii, United States	Light Heavyweight bout.
Loss	21–7	Jeremy Horn	Decision (split)	IFL: Oakland	January 19, 2007	5	4:00	California, United States	
Win	21–6	Tony Williams	KO	Extreme Wars 5: Battlegrounds	October 6, 2006	1	2:48	Hawaii, United States	Light Heavyweight bout.
Loss	20–6	Robbie Lawler	KO (punches)	Icon Sport: Lawler vs. Niko 2	February 25, 2006	1	3:38	Hawaii, United States	
Loss	20–5	Jason Miller	Submission (rear naked choke)	Icon Sport: Opposites Attract	October 28, 2005	2	2:41	Hawaii, United States	
Loss	20–4	Robbie Lawler	KO (punches)	Superbrawl: Icon	July 23, 2005	2	4:36	Hawaii, United States	
Win	20–3	Masanori Suda	KO (punch)	SB 39: Destiny	April 9, 2005	1	4:07	Hawaii, United States	
Win	19–3	Ron Fields	Submission (heel hook)	SuperBrawl 38	December 12, 2004	1	3:48	Hawaii, United States	Light Heavyweight bout.
Win	18–3	Yushin Okami	Decision (split)	SuperBrawl 36	June 18, 2004	3	5:00	Hawaii, United States	
Win	17–3	Keith Winters	Submission (toe hold)	SuperBrawl 34	March 28, 2004	1	1:24	Hawaii, United States	Light Heavyweight bout.
Win	16–3	Dave Menne	Decision (unanimous)	SuperBrawl 33	February 7, 2004	3	5:00	Hawaii, United States	
Loss	15–3	Matt Lindland	TKO (submission to strikes)	UFC 45	November 21, 2003	3	4:23	Connecticut, United States	
Win	15–2	Justin Ellison	KO	SuperBrawl 31	September 20, 2003	1	2:35	Hawaii, United States	
Win	14–2	Matt Lindland	KO (slam)	UFC 43	June 6, 2003	1	1:56	Nevada, United States	
Win	13–2	Tyrone Roberts	Submission (toe hold)	SuperBrawl 28	February 8, 2003	2	1:26	Hawaii, United States	
Win	12–2	Sean McCully	Submission	SuperBrawl 27	November 9, 2002	1	0:51	Hawaii, United States	
Win	11–2	Pascal Gosselin	Submission (armbar)	UCC Hawaii: Eruption in Hawaii	September 17, 2002	1	2:00	Hawaii, United States	
Win	10–2	Charlie Wesr	Submission (toe hold)	Force Fighting Championships 1	May 18, 2002	2	1:15	Hawaii, United States	
Win	9–2	Jason Drexel	Submission (kimura)	SuperBrawl 23	March 9, 2002	1	3:05	Hawaii, United States	
Loss	8–2	Sean Gray	TKO (punches)	Warriors Quest 3: Punishment in Paradise	December 1, 2001	1	3:47	Hawaii, United States	
Win	8–1	John Renken	TKO	SuperBrawl 22	November 2, 2001	1	2:29	Hawaii, United States	
Win	7–1	Todd Medina	Decision (unanimous)	Warriors Quest 1: The New Beginning	May 29, 2001	3	5:00	Hawaii, United States	
Win	6–1	Dennis Reed	Submission (armbar)	SuperBrawl 21	May 24, 2001	1	0:43	Hawaii, United States	Return to Middleweight.
Win	5–1	Ricardo Barros	TKO	Warriors of the New Millennium 2	November 24, 2000	1	3:44	Hawaii, United States	
Loss	4–1	Yasuhito Namekawa	Submission (guillotine choke)	RINGS USA: Rising Stars Block B	July 22, 2000	2	0:27	Hawaii, United States	Light Heavyweight debut.
Win	4–0	Aaron Torres	Submission (armbar)	KOTC 4: Gladiators	June 24, 2000	1	2:21	California, United States	
Win	3–0	Ahmad Reese	TKO (submission to strikes)	Rage in the Cage 3	January 18, 2000	1	1:41	Hawaii, United States	
Win	2–0	Phil Ortiz	Submission (armbar)	SuperBrawl 15	December 7, 1999	1	2:39	Hawaii, United States	
Win	1–0	Aaron Riley	TKO	RITC 2: Marching of the Warriors	October 15, 1999	1	7:06	Hawaii, United States	
