= Brandon Thatch =

American mixed martial arts fighter

- Born: July 11, 1985 (age 41); Denver, Colorado, United States
- Other names: Rukus
- Height: 6 ft 2 in (1.88 m)
- Weight: 170 lb (77 kg; 12 st 2 lb)
- Division: Welterweight
- Reach: 74 1/2 in (189 cm)
- Fighting out of: Denver, Colorado, United States
- Team: Elevation Fight Team
- Years active: 2007–present

Mixed martial arts record
- Total: 16
- Wins: 11
- By knockout: 7
- By submission: 4
- Losses: 5
- By submission: 4
- By decision: 1

Amateur record
- Total: 3
- Wins: 3
- By knockout: 1
- By submission: 2

Other information
- Mixed martial arts record from Sherdog

Brandon Michael Mathew Thatch (born July 11, 1985) is an American professional mixed martial artist who most recently competed in the Welterweight division of the Ultimate Fighting Championship.

== Background ==
Thatch was adopted at age five by his mother's partner, Clarence Thatch, a former karate champion and MMA specialist. Thatch's grandfather was also a professional boxer. Thatch began training in karate at the age of three, and fought in his first kickboxing bout at age 17. He later transitioned into a career in mixed martial arts.

== Mixed martial arts career ==
=== Early career ===
Thatch started his amateur MMA career on March 31, 2007, against Jesse Brown, which he won via second round submission. Thatch went undefeated as amateur in 2007 with a 3–0 record. He made his pro debut in June 2008 against Mike Crisman at Ring of Fire 32. Thatch won the fight via TKO 38 seconds into the fight.

Thatch made his Strikeforce debut against Brandon Magana at Strikeforce: At The Mansion II. He lost the fight via split decision. He would bounce back with an 18-second head kick knockout win over Michael Arrant at Ring of Fire 33. In Thatch's next fight, he took on Danny Davis Jr, winning via submission in the first round.

Thatchthen faced Chris Holland at Ring of Fire 40, winning via KO in 19 seconds. Next for Thatch was a bout with Chidi Njokuani at Ring of Fire 41, which he won by TKO in the first minute. In his next fight, Thatch took on Patrick Vallee at Instinct MMA 2 on December 2, 2011, winning via TKO in 15 seconds. Thatch was named Bloody Elbow's #3 welterweight prospect in their annual scouting report. Four months later, Thatch fought Jory Erickson at Instinct MMA 3. He won the fight by KO in 18 seconds. Thatch next faced Martin Grandmont at Instinct MMA 4 on June 29, 2012. He won the fight via submission in the first round.

In Thatch's next fight, he headlined Resurrection Fighting Alliance 7 against Mike Rhodes. Thatch won the bout via submission in the first round. Before and after the fight, Thatch believed that he was going to get a call from the UFC.

=== Ultimate Fighting Championship ===
On May 8, 2013, Thatch signed a multi-fight deal with the UFC.

Thatch faced Justin Edwards on August 28, 2013, at UFC Fight Night 27. He won the fight via TKO in the first round. The win earned him his first Knockout of the Night bonus award.

In his second UFC fight, Thatch faced Paulo Thiago at UFC Fight Night 32 on November 9, 2013. He won the fight via TKO in the first round, forcing Thiago to submit after landing a knee to the liver. With the win, Thatch extended his first round finish streak to ten.

Thatch was expected to face Jordan Mein on August 23, 2014, at UFC Fight Night 49, replacing an injured Thiago Alves. Subsequently, Thatch pulled out of the bout with Mein, citing a toe injury.

Thatch was expected to face Stephen Thompson on February 14, 2015, at UFC Fight Night 60. However, Thompson pulled out of the fight on January 30, citing a rib injury. Subsequently, Thatch faced former UFC Lightweight Champion Benson Henderson at the event. Thatch lost the back and forth fight via submission in the fourth round. Their performance earned both participants Fight of the Night honors.

Thatch was expected to face John Howard on July 11, 2015, at UFC 189. However, on June 23, Thatch was pulled from that bout in favor of a fight with Gunnar Nelson, as his scheduled opponent, John Hathaway, was forced out with an injury. Thatch lost the fight by submission in the first round after getting knocked down by Nelson.

Thatch next faced Siyar Bahadurzada on March 5, 2016, at UFC 196. He lost the fight via submission in the third round.

Thatch was expected to face Erick Silva on September 24, 2016, at UFC Fight Night 95. However, Thatch pulled out of the fight with an undisclosed injury and was subsequently replaced by Luan Chagas.

Thatch was expected to face Sabah Homasi on December 30, 2016, at UFC 207. However, Homasi pulled out of the fight, citing injury, and was subsequently replaced by promotional newcomer Niko Price. Thatch lost the fight by submission in the first round and was subsequently released from the promotion.

== Championships and accomplishments ==
- Ultimate Fighting Championship
  - Fight of the Night (One time) vs. Benson Henderson
  - Knockout of the Night (One time) vs. Justin Edwards
  - UFC.com Awards
    - 2013: Newcomer of the Year
- Ring of Fire
  - Young Guns Welterweight Championship (One time)
- ESPN
  - 2015 Best Fight of the Half-Year vs. Benson Henderson

== Mixed martial arts record ==
Professional record breakdown
16 matches	11 wins	5 losses
By knockout	8	0
By submission	3	4
By decision	0	1

Res.	Record	Opponent	Method	Event	Date	Round	Time	Location	Notes
Loss	11–5	Niko Price	Submission (arm-triangle choke)	UFC 207	December 30, 2016	1	4:30	Las Vegas, Nevada, United States	
Loss	11–4	Siyar Bahadurzada	Submission (arm-triangle choke)	UFC 196	March 5, 2016	3	4:11	Las Vegas, Nevada, United States	
Loss	11–3	Gunnar Nelson	Submission (rear-naked choke)	UFC 189	July 11, 2015	1	2:54	Las Vegas, Nevada, United States	
Loss	11–2	Benson Henderson	Submission (rear-naked choke)	UFC Fight Night: Henderson vs. Thatch	February 14, 2015	4	3:58	Broomfield, Colorado, United States	Fight of the Night.
Win	11–1	Paulo Thiago	TKO (submission to knee to the body)	UFC Fight Night: Belfort vs. Henderson	November 9, 2013	1	2:10	Goiânia, Brazil	
Win	10–1	Justin Edwards	TKO (knees and punches)	UFC Fight Night: Condit vs. Kampmann 2	August 28, 2013	1	1:23	Indianapolis, Indiana, United States	Knockout of the Night.
Win	9–1	Mike Rhodes	Submission (rear-naked choke)	RFA 7	March 22, 2013	1	2:22	Broomfield, Colorado, United States	
Win	8–1	Martin Grandmont	Submission (rear-naked choke)	Instinct MMA: Instinct Fighting 4	June 29, 2012	1	1:55	Montreal, Quebec, Canada	
Win	7–1	Jory Erickson	KO (knee)	Instinct MMA: Instinct Fighting 3	March 31, 2012	1	0:18	Sherbrooke, Quebec, Canada	
Win	6–1	Patrick Vallee	TKO (punches)	Instinct MMA: Instinct Fighting 2	December 2, 2011	1	0:15	Quebec City, Quebec, Canada	
Win	5–1	Chidi Njokuani	TKO (punches)	Ring of Fire 41: Bragging Rights	August 20, 2011	1	0:53	Broomfield, Colorado, United States	Catchweight (173 lbs) bout; Njokuani missed weight.
Win	4–1	Chris Holland	KO (punches)	Ring of Fire 40: Backlash	April 16, 2011	1	0:19	Broomfield, Colorado, United States	Won the ROF Young Guns Welterweight Championship.
Win	3–1	Danny Davis Jr.	Submission (rear-naked choke)	Ring of Fire 39: Summer Brawl 2	August 27, 2010	1	4:12	Denver, Colorado, United States	
Win	2–1	Michael Arrant	KO (head kick)	Ring of Fire 33: Adrenaline	January 10, 2009	1	0:18	Broomfield, Colorado, United States	
Loss	1–1	Brandon Magana	Decision (split)	Strikeforce: At The Mansion II	September 20, 2008	3	3:00	Los Angeles, California, United States	
Win	1–0	Mike Crisman	TKO (knees)	Ring of Fire 32: Respect	June 13, 2008	1	0:38	Broomfield, Colorado, United States	

== See also ==
- List of current UFC fighters
- List of male mixed martial artists
