= Héctor Lombard =

Cuban judoka and mixed martial artist

- Born: 2 February 1978 (age 48); Matanzas, Cuba
- Other names: Lightning
- Nationality: Australian; Cuban (expatriate)
- Height: 5 ft 9 in (175 cm)
- Weight: 185 lb (84 kg; 13 st 3 lb)
- Division: Welterweight (2013–2016); Middleweight (2006–2013, 2016–present); Light Heavyweight (2004–2006)
- Reach: 71 in (180 cm)
- Style: Judo, Kickboxing
- Stance: Southpaw
- Fighting out of: Coconut Creek, Florida, United States
- Team: American Top Team
- Rank: Fourth dan black belt in Judo; Second degree black belt in Brazilian Jiu-Jitsu under Ricardo Liborio
- Years active: 2004–present

Kickboxing record
- Total: 2
- Wins: 2
- Losses: 0

Mixed martial arts record
- Total: 49
- Wins: 34
- By knockout: 22
- By submission: 4
- By decision: 8
- Losses: 11
- By knockout: 3
- By decision: 6
- By disqualification: 2
- Draws: 1
- No contests: 3

Other information
- Mixed martial arts record from Sherdog
- Judo career
- Weight class: ‍–‍73 kg

Judo achievements and titles
- Olympic Games: R32 (2000)
- World Champ.: R64 (2001)

Profile at external judo databases
- IJF: 53110
- JudoInside.com: 8946

Medal record

Men's judo

Representing Australia

International Judo Federation
Gold medal – first place	2004 Australian Open	81 kg
Gold medal – first place	2004 Australian Open	Openweight
Bronze medal – third place	2002 International Open Tre Torri	73 kg

Representing Cuba

Federación Cubana de Judo
Gold medal – first place	1997 Junior Cuba Nationals Championship	73 kg
Gold medal – first place	1999 Cuban National Championships	73 kg
Gold medal – first place	2000 Cuban National Championships	73 kg
Gold medal – first place	2001 Cuban National Championships	73 kg
Silver medal – second place	1998 National Seniors Cuba Championship	73 kg
Bronze medal – third place	1997 National Seniors Cuba Championship	73 kg

International Judo Federation
Gold medal – first place	2000 Torneo International Jose Ramon Rodriges	73 kg
Gold medal – first place	2001 Torneo International	73 kg
Gold medal – first place	2001 International Open Guido Sieni	73 kg
Silver medal – second place	1998 Campeonato Ibero Americano	73 kg
Silver medal – second place	2001 Austria Open	73 kg
Silver medal – second place	2001 Tre Torri International Open	73 kg
Bronze medal – third place	2001 World Masters Germany	73 kg

Héctor Lombard (born 2 February 1978) is a Cuban-Australian professional mixed martial artist, bodybuilder, and former Olympic judoka who competes in the Light Heavyweight division of Eagle FC. Lombard has also competed in the middleweight and welterweight divisions. Lombard is best known for his tenure in the Ultimate Fighting Championship and has also fought in Deep, Pride, and Bellator where he was the inaugural Bellator Middleweight Champion.

== Early life ==
Lombard was born in Cuba and represented his nation of birth at the 2000 Sydney Olympics in lightweight division of the Judo competition, a sport in which he is a fourth degree black belt. While in Australia, he met his future wife and the two decided to settle on the Gold Coast, where he began training with renowned kickboxer Nathan Corbett at Five Rings Dojo. Lombard currently trains at the American Top Team facility in Coconut Creek, Florida. Marcus "Conan" Silveira (ATT Head Coach) awarded Lombard with a black belt in Brazilian jiu-jitsu following his victory at CFC 12.

Lombard's first child, Leonardo, was born in 2006. Leonardo Lombard was drafted to the Gold Coast Suns in the Australian Football League (AFL) in 2024.

== Mixed martial arts ==
=== PRIDE ===
In 2006, Lombard fought twice in PRIDE. He lost both fights by unanimous decision, the first to Akihiro Gono and the second to Gegard Mousasi.

=== Cage Fighting Championship ===
Lombard headlined the first Cage Fighting Championship show on 28 July 2007, where he fought top Australian fighter Kyle Noke. The result was a controversial draw. On 23 November 2007, Lombard defeated French kickboxer and actor, Jean-François Lénogue to be the CFC Middleweight Champion. He has defended his title six times, with the last title defence coming against Art Santore. Lombard next successfully defended his belt against UFC veteran Joe Doerksen at CFC 16 on 25 March 2011.

=== Ultimate Fighting Championship ===
Lombard was scheduled to compete for the promotion at UFC 78, but was forced to withdraw due to visa issues.

=== EliteXC ===
On 18 April 2008, EliteXC released a press statement citing the signing of Héctor Lombard. His first opponent was scheduled to be Scott Smith in November, but the fight was later cancelled after the collapse of the promotion.

=== Bellator Fighting Championships ===
On 6 January 2009, it was announced that Héctor Lombard had signed an exclusive agreement with Bellator Fighting Championships. He fought and defeated Virgil Lozano and Damien Stelly to make it to the finals and fight for the first Bellator Middleweight Championship belt. Lombard defeated Jared Hess via doctor stoppage in the fourth round to win the middleweight title.

Lombard was scheduled to face Paulo Filho in a non-title bout on 13 May 2010 at Bellator 18, but Filho pulled out of the bout on 10 May due to an alleged visa issue and was replaced by Jay Silva. Lombard scored the fastest knockout in Bellator history by recording a six-second win, surpassing Eddie Sanchez and his ten-second KO win over Jay White.

Lombard then faced former NFL player Herbert Goodman in a non-title fight on 12 August 2010 at Bellator 24. He won the fight via KO (punches) in the first round.

On 28 October 2010, Lombard defeated Alexander Shlemenko in a 1st season winner vs. a 2nd season winner matchup to retain the Bellator Middleweight Championship at Bellator 34. He was the first man in Bellator history to successfully defend his title belt in any weight division.

Lombard next fought Falaniko Vitale in a non-title bout at Bellator 44. He won via KO in third round.

Lombard fought in another non-title bout against Trevor Prangley at Bellator 58 on 19 November 2011. Lombard won the fight via second-round TKO.

On 30 January 2012, Lombard's contract with Bellator expired.

=== Australian Fighting Championship ===
Lombard also captured the inaugural Australian Fighting Championship (AFC) middleweight title when he submitted Jesse Taylor in the second round with a heel hook at AFC 2. In the first and beginning of the second rounds, he used superior strength to out-grapple Taylor. This victory would extend his winning streak to 24 wins

=== Ultimate Fighting Championship ===
It was confirmed on 24 April 2012 that Héctor Lombard had signed with the UFC. Lombard was expected to make his UFC debut against Brian Stann on 4 August 2012 at UFC on Fox 4. However, Stann was forced out of the bout citing a shoulder injury. In turn, Lombard was pulled from the card and instead faced Tim Boetsch on 21 July 2012 at UFC 149, replacing an injured Michael Bisping. Even though Lombard scored a knockdown and a couple of takedowns, he lost the fight by split decision.

Lombard faced Rousimar Palhares on 15 December 2012 at UFC on FX 6. Lombard knocked Palhares out in the first round with ground and pound after having knocked him down with punches.

Lombard was defeated by Yushin Okami at UFC on Fuel TV: Silva vs. Stann on 3 March 2013.

Lombard next dropped down to the welterweight division to face Nate Marquardt on 19 October 2013 at UFC 166. He won the fight via knockout in the first round.

Lombard faced Jake Shields on 15 March 2014 at UFC 171. He won the fight via unanimous decision.

Lombard was expected to face Dong Hyun Kim on 23 August 2014 at UFC Fight Night 48. However, he pulled out of the bout and was replaced by Tyron Woodley. Lombard faced returning UFC veteran Josh Burkman on 3 January 2015 at UFC 182. He won the fight by unanimous decision. Subsequent to the event, it was revealed that he failed his post-fight drug test, testing positive for the anabolic steroid desoxymethyltestosterone.

Lombard was expected to face Rory MacDonald on 25 April 2015 at UFC 186. However, on 10 February, the UFC indicated that both participants had been removed from the card and that the pairing had been scrapped as both fighters are expected to be rebooked against a new opponent.

On 23 March 2015, it was announced that Lombard had been suspended for one year (retroactive to 3 January) and fined his original $53,000 win bonus, plus one-third of the rest of his purse, which included $53,000 in show money, and had his win over Josh Burkman overturned to a no contest by the Nevada Athletic Commission (NSAC) for failing his UFC 182 drug test. In addition to his suspension, fine, and overturning of the win, he also must pass a drug test prior to getting re-licensed by the NSAC.

Losing Streak

In his first fight after the PED suspension was lifted, Lombard faced Neil Magny on 20 March 2016 at UFC Fight Night 85. After nearly finishing Magny with strikes in the first round, he was stopped via TKO in the third round.

Lombard faced Dan Henderson in a middleweight bout on 4 June 2016 at UFC 199. After a back and forth first round, he was stopped via KO in the second round.

Lombard was expected to face Brad Tavares on 28 January 2017 at UFC on Fox 23. However, the bout was scrapped on 10 January due to undisclosed reasons. Lombard was quickly rescheduled and faced Johny Hendricks on 19 February 2017 at UFC Fight Night 105. He lost the back-and-forth fight via unanimous decision.

Lombard faced Anthony Smith on 16 September 2017 at UFC Fight Night 116. He lost the fight via KO in the third round.

Lombard faced C. B. Dollaway on 3 March 2018 at UFC 222. At the conclusion of the first round, Lombard landed two strikes after the horn, which rendered Dolloway unable to continue. As a result, Lombard was disqualified.

Lombard faced Thales Leites on 22 September 2018, at UFC Fight Night 137. He lost the fight via unanimous decision.

=== Eagle Fighting Championship ===
Lombard faced Thiago Silva on 20 May 2022 at Eagle FC 48. After initially knocking down Silva in the first round, Lombard was knocked down himself in the second, before being hit with an illegal knee that rendered him unable to continue. As a result, the fight was declared a no contest.

=== Gamebred Bareknuckle MMA ===
Lombard faced Chris Sarro at Gamebred Bareknuckle MMA 6 on 10 November 2023. Lombard was disqualified for illegal strikes to the back of the head. The result was later overturned to a win (submission to punches) for Lombard due to Sarro visibly tapping at the end of the bout.

=== Global Fight League ===
On 11 December 2024, it was announced that Lombard was signed by Global Fight League. However, in April 2025, it was reported that all GFL events were cancelled indefinitely.

== Bare-knuckle boxing ==
=== Bare Knuckle Fighting Championship ===
On 8 October 2019, it was announced that Lombard had left the UFC and had signed with Bare Knuckle Fighting Championship. The UFC announced that it had terminated Lombard's contract that September. Lombard was expected to headline BKFC 10 against fellow UFC veteran Joe Riggs in February 2020. However, in January, the company announced that Lombard will instead be facing David Mundell, with no further information. Lombard won the fight via unanimous decision.

In the sophomore bout of his bare knuckle boxing tenure, Lombard faced fellow UFC veteran Kendall Grove at BKFC 12 on 11 September 2020. He won the fight by knockout in the first round.

==== BKFC Cruiserweight Champion ====
Lombard then faced Joe Riggs for the inaugural BKFC Cruiserweight Championship at BKFC 18 on 26 June 2021. He won the fight and claimed the championship via fourth-round technical knockout. Immediately after the fight, Lombard had his post-fight interview interrupted by fellow BKFC competitor Lorenzo Hunt resulting in Lombard punching Hunt in the face twice, initiating a minor brawl.

Lombard then attempted his first title defense against Lorenzo Hunt at BKFC 22 on 12 November 2021. He ended up losing the title via unanimous decision.

=== Gromda ===
On 9 September 2023, it was reported that Lombard had signed with the Polish promotion Gromda.

== Dirty Boxing career ==
Lombard was booked for Mike Perry's "Dirty Boxing" promotion, making his debut at Dirty Boxing Championship 3 against James "The Loose" Cannon. He lost via TKO in the first round, being knocked down by a 1–2 combination before being swarmed by Cannon with ground and pound.

== Professional grappling career ==
Lombard then faced Chris Weidman at ACBJJ 16 on 19 June 2025, but was disqualified for throwing a punch.

== Championships and accomplishments ==
=== Mixed martial arts ===
- Bellator Fighting Championships
  - Bellator Middleweight World Championship (One time; First)
  - One successful title defense
  - Bellator Season 1 Middleweight Tournament Winner
  - Fastest Recorded Knockout in Bellator History (0:06)
- Ultimate Fighting Championship
  - UFC.com Awards
    - 2012: Ranked No. 4 Newcomer of the Year
- Cage Fighting Championship
  - CFC Middleweight Championship (One time; First)
  - Most successful CFC title defences (Seven)
- Australian Fighting Championship
  - AFC Middleweight Championship (One time; First)
- Xtreme Fighting Championships (Australia)
  - XFC Light Heavyweight Championship (One time; First)
- Bleacher Report
  - 2011 MMA All-Star Second Team
- Sherdog
  - 2011 All-Violence Second Team
  - 2010 All-Violence First Team
- Inside MMA
  - 2009 Bloodbath of the Year Bazzie Award vs. Jared Hess on 19 June

=== Bare-knuckle boxing ===
- Bare Knuckle Fighting Championship
  - BKFC Cruiserweight Championship (one time; first)

| class="col-break col-break-2" |

=== Judo ===
- International Judo Federation
  - 2004 Gold : Australian Open, 81 kg and Open Weight (+100 kg)
  - 2002 Bronze : International Open Tre Torri, Italy – 73 kg
  - 2002 Silver : International Open Guido Sieni Tournament, Italy – 73 kg
  - 2001 Gold : Torneo International Jose Ramon Rodrigues City Santiago de Cuba – 73 kg
  - 2001 Silver : Tre Torri International Open – 73 kg
  - 2001 7th place: Hungarian Open – 73 kg
  - 2001 Bronze : World Masters Germany – 73 kg
  - 2001 Silver : Austria Open – 73 kg
  - 2000 Member of the Cuban Olympic Team – 73 kg
  - 2000 Gold : Torneo International Jose Ramon Rodriges, City Santa Clara – 73 kg
  - 1999 7th Place: Paris Open – 73 kg
  - 1998 Silver : Campeonato Ibero Americano – 73 kg
- Federacion Cuba de Judo
  - 2002 Undefeated: World Team Championships, Suiza – 73 kg
  - 2001 Gold : Cuban National Championships, City Santiago de Cuba – 73 kg
  - 2000 Gold : Cuban National Championships, City Santa Clara – 73 kg
  - 1999 Gold : Cuban National Championships – 73 kg
  - 1998 Silver : National Seniors Cuba Championship – 73 kg
  - 1997 Bronze : National Seniors Cuba Championship, Ciudad de la Havana – 73 kg
  - 1997 Gold : Junior Cuba Nationals Championship, Ciudad Santa Clara – 73 kg
  - 1994 College National Champion, City Las Tunas – 71 kg
  - 1993 College National Champion, City Ciudad de la Havana – 71 kg
  - 1991 College National Champion, City Isla de la Juventud – 52 kg

== Mixed martial arts record ==
Professional record breakdown
49 matches	34 wins	11 losses
By knockout	22	3
By submission	4	0
By decision	8	6
By disqualification	0	2
Draws	1	
No contests	3	

Res.	Record	Opponent	Method	Event	Date	Round	Time	Location	Notes
Loss	34–11–1 (3)	Chris Sarro	DQ (punches to back of head)	Gamebred Bareknuckle MMA 6	10 November 2023	1	1:09	Biloxi, Mississippi, United States	Bare knuckle MMA.
NC	34–10–1 (3)	Thiago Silva	NC (illegal knee)	Eagle FC 47	20 May 2022	2	1:44	Miami, Florida, United States	Return to Light Heavyweight. Accidental illegal knee rendered Lombard unable to continue.
Loss	34–10–1 (2)	Thales Leites	Decision (unanimous)	UFC Fight Night: Santos vs. Anders	22 September 2018	3	5:00	São Paulo, Brazil	
Loss	34–9–1 (2)	C. B. Dollaway	DQ (punches after the bell)	UFC 222	3 March 2018	1	5:00	Las Vegas, Nevada, United States	Lombard was disqualified after hitting Dollaway twice after the bell, rendering him unable to continue.
Loss	34–8–1 (2)	Anthony Smith	KO (punch)	UFC Fight Night: Rockhold vs. Branch	16 September 2017	3	2:33	Pittsburgh, Pennsylvania, United States	
Loss	34–7–1 (2)	Johny Hendricks	Decision (unanimous)	UFC Fight Night: Lewis vs. Browne	19 February 2017	3	5:00	Halifax, Nova Scotia, Canada	
Loss	34–6–1 (2)	Dan Henderson	KO (elbow)	UFC 199	4 June 2016	2	1:27	Inglewood, California, United States	Return to Middleweight.
Loss	34–5–1 (2)	Neil Magny	TKO (punches)	UFC Fight Night: Hunt vs. Mir	20 March 2016	3	1:26	Brisbane, Australia	
NC	34–4–1 (2)	Josh Burkman	NC (overturned by NSAC)	UFC 182	3 January 2015	3	5:00	Las Vegas, Nevada, United States	Originally a unanimous decision win for Lombard; overturned after he tested positive for anabolic steroids.
Win	34–4–1 (1)	Jake Shields	Decision (unanimous)	UFC 171	15 March 2014	3	5:00	Dallas, Texas, United States	
Win	33–4–1 (1)	Nate Marquardt	KO (punches)	UFC 166	19 October 2013	1	1:48	Houston, Texas, United States	Welterweight debut.
Loss	32–4–1 (1)	Yushin Okami	Decision (split)	UFC on Fuel TV: Silva vs. Stann	3 March 2013	3	5:00	Saitama, Japan	
Win	32–3–1 (1)	Rousimar Palhares	KO (punches)	UFC on FX: Sotiropoulos vs. Pearson	15 December 2012	1	3:38	Gold Coast, Australia	
Loss	31–3–1 (1)	Tim Boetsch	Decision (split)	UFC 149	21 July 2012	3	5:00	Calgary, Alberta, Canada	
Win	31–2–1 (1)	Trevor Prangley	TKO (punches)	Bellator 58	19 November 2011	2	1:06	Hollywood, Florida, United States	Catchweight (195 lb) bout.
Win	30–2–1 (1)	Jesse Taylor	Submission (heel hook)	Australian FC 2	3 September 2011	2	1:26	Melbourne, Australia	Won the inaugural Australian FC Middleweight Championship.
Win	29–2–1 (1)	Falaniko Vitale	KO (punch)	Bellator 44	14 May 2011	3	0:54	Atlantic City, New Jersey, United States	Non-title bout.
Win	28–2–1 (1)	Joe Doerksen	TKO (doctor stoppage)	Cage FC 16	25 March 2011	1	4:13	Sydney, Australia	Defended the Cage FC Middleweight Championship.
Win	27–2–1 (1)	Alexander Shlemenko	Decision (unanimous)	Bellator 34	28 October 2010	5	5:00	Hollywood, Florida, United States	Defended the Bellator Middleweight World Championship. Later vacated title.
Win	26–2–1 (1)	Herbert Goodman	KO (punches)	Bellator 24	12 August 2010	1	0:38	Hollywood, Florida, United States	Non-title bout.
Win	25–2–1 (1)	Jay Silva	KO (punches)	Bellator 18	13 May 2010	1	0:06	Monroe, Louisiana, United States	Catchweight (195 lb) bout.
Win	24–2–1 (1)	Art Santore	TKO (doctor stoppage)	Cage FC 12	12 March 2010	1	4:23	Sydney, Australia	Defended the Cage FC Middleweight Championship.
Win	23–2–1 (1)	Joey Gorczynski	Decision (unanimous)	G-Force Fights: Bad Blood 3	4 February 2010	3	5:00	Miami, Florida, United States	Light Heavyweight bout.
Win	22–2–1 (1)	Kalib Starnes	TKO (submission to punches)	Cage FC 11	20 November 2009	1	1:55	Sydney, Australia	Defended the Cage FC Middleweight Championship.
Win	21–2–1 (1)	Jared Hess	TKO (doctor stoppage)	Bellator 12	19 June 2009	4	1:41	Hollywood, Florida, United States	Won the Bellator Season 1 Middleweight Tournament and the inaugural Bellator Middleweight World Championship.
Win	20–2–1 (1)	Damien Stelly	TKO (punches)	Bellator 9	29 May 2009	1	2:56	Monroe, Louisiana, United States	Bellator Season 1 Middleweight Tournament Semifinal.
Win	19–2–1 (1)	Virgil Lozano	KO (punch)	Bellator 3	17 April 2009	1	1:10	Norman, Oklahoma, United States	Bellator Season 1 Middleweight Tournament Quarterfinal.
Win	18–2–1 (1)	Ron Verdadero	TKO (suplex and punches)	Cage FC 7	20 February 2009	1	0:20	Sydney, Australia	Defended the CFC Middleweight Championship.
Win	17–2–1 (1)	Brian Ebersole	TKO (submission to punches)	Cage FC 5	12 September 2008	4	1:56	Sydney, Australia	Defended the Cage FC Middleweight Championship.
Win	16–2–1 (1)	Fabiano Capoani	KO (elbows)	Cage FC 4	23 May 2008	2	0:23	Sydney, Australia	Defended the Cage FC Middleweight Championship.
Win	15–2–1 (1)	Tristan Yunker	TKO (corner stoppage)	Cage FC 3	15 February 2008	1	3:10	Sydney, Australia	Defended the Cage FC Middleweight Championship.
Win	14–2–1 (1)	Damir Mihajlovic	Decision (unanimous)	Serbia vs. Australia	21 December 2007	3	5:00	Belgrade, Serbia	
Win	13–2–1 (1)	Jean-François Lenogue	Decision (unanimous)	Cage FC 2	23 November 2007	3	5:00	Sydney, Australia	Won the inaugural Cage FC Middleweight Championship.
Win	12–2–1 (1)	Tatsuya Kurisu	TKO (corner stoppage)	X-Agon 2	2 November 2007	1	0:48	Sydney, Australia	
Draw	11–2–1 (1)	Kyle Noke	Draw	Cage FC 1	28 July 2007	3	5:00	Sydney, Australia	
Win	11–2 (1)	Fabio Galeb	KO (punches)	Oceania FC 1	19 May 2007	1	3:24	Sydney, Australia	
Win	10–2 (1)	Yusaku Tsukumo	Decision (unanimous)	Warriors Realm 9	12 May 2007	3	5:00	Gold Coast, Australia	
Win	9–2 (1)	James Te Huna	TKO (shoulder injury)	Warriors Realm 8	23 March 2007	1	3:50	Sydney, Australia	
Win	8–2 (1)	Eiji Ishikawa	TKO (punches)	DEEP 28 Impact	16 February 2007	1	0:50	Tokyo, Japan	
Loss	7–2 (1)	Gegard Mousasi	Decision (unanimous)	Pride Bushido 13	5 November 2006	2	5:00	Yokohama, Japan	2006 Pride Welterweight Grand Prix Alternate bout.
Win	7–1 (1)	Kim Jae-young	Submission (armbar)	Spirit MC 9	8 October 2006	1	1:36	Seoul, South Korea	
Win	6–1 (1)	Michael Ravenscroft	Decision (unanimous)	Dojo KO: Second Elimination	22 July 2006	3	5:00	Melbourne, Australia	
Loss	5–1 (1)	Akihiro Gono	Decision (unanimous)	Pride Bushido Survival 2006	4 June 2006	2	5:00	Saitama, Japan	2006 Pride Welterweight Grand Prix Opening Round.
Win	5–0 (1)	Mathew Toa	Submission (armbar)	Ultimate Promotions: Total Termination	1 April 2006	1	0:36	Gold Coast, Australia	
Win	4–0 (1)	Daiju Takase	KO (punch)	X-Plosion 13	18 March 2006	1	4:40	Gold Coast, Australia	
Win	3–0 (1)	David Frendin	KO (punches)	XFC 10	3 March 2006	1	0:52	Gold Coast, Australia	Won the inaugural XFC Light Heavyweight Championship.
Win	2–0 (1)	Adam Bourke	Submission (toe hold)	XFC 9	26 November 2005	1	1:44	Gold Coast, Australia	
NC	1–0 (1)	Cris Brown	NC (accidental headbutt)	Warriors Realm 3	12 March 2005	1	N/A	Brisbane, Australia	Accidental headbutt led to Brown being knocked unconscious.
Win	1–0	Michael Grunindike	Decision (unanimous)	Spartan Reality Fight 11	26 September 2004	2	5:00	Gold Coast, Australia	

== Modified rules: fight record ==
Professional record breakdown
3 matches	3 wins	0 losses
By knockout	1	0
By decision	2	0
Draws	0	

Result	Record	Opponent	Method	Event	Date	Rd.	Time	Location	Notes
Win	3–0	Aaron Boyes	KO	Xplosion 18	2008-03-29	2		Sydney, Australia	X-Rules
Win	2–0	Daniel Patterson	Decision (unanimous)	Prosecution 2	2007-06-15	3		Melbourne, Australia	Muay Thai
Win	1–0	Ronnie Najjar	Decision (unanimous)	Fight Force Event at QBH	2007-03-04	3		Melbourne, Australia	Muay Thai

== Judo record ==
Result	Opponent	Event	Division	Date	Location
Loss	(Russia) Anatoly Laryukov	2001 World Judo Championships	73 kg	July 26, 2001	(Germany) Munich
Loss	(Ukraine) Gennadiy Bilodid	2000 Summer Olympics	73 kg	August 18, 2000	(Australia) Sydney
Win	(Egypt) Haitham El Hossainy	2000 Summer Olympics	73 kg	August 18, 2000	(Australia) Sydney

== Kickboxing record ==
Kickboxing Record
2 Win (0 (T)KO's, 2 decisions), 0 Losses, 0 Draws
Date	Result	Opponent	Event	Location	Method	Round	Time	Record
15 June 2007	Win	(Australia) Daniel Paterson	Prosecution 2	Melbourne, Australia	UD	3	2:00	2–0
4 March 2007	Win	(Australia) Ronnie Najjar	Fight Force Presents: QBH Kickboxing	Melbourne, Australia	SD	3	2:00	1–0
Legend: Win Loss Draw/No contest Notes

== Bare knuckle record ==
Professional record breakdown
5 matches	3 wins	2 losses
By knockout	2	1
By decision	1	1

Res.	Record	Opponent	Method	Event	Date	Round	Time	Location	Notes
Loss	3–2	Gracjan Szadziński	TKO (doctor stoppage)	Fight Mode 2: Lombard vs. Szadziński	3 October 2026	3	N/A	Legionowo, Poland	
Loss	3–1	Lorenzo Hunt	Decision (unanimous)	BKFC 22	12 November 2021	5	2:00	Miami, Florida, United States	For the inaugural BKFC Light Heavyweight Championship.
Win	3–0	Joe Riggs	TKO (doctor stoppage)	BKFC 18	26 June 2021	4	1:07	Miami, Florida, United States	Won the inaugural BKFC Cruiserweight Championship.
Win	2–0	Kendall Grove	TKO (punches)	BKFC 12	11 September 2020	1	1:50	Daytona Beach, Florida, United States	
Win	1–0	David Mundell	Decision (unanimous)	BKFC 10	15 February 2020	5	2:00	Fort Lauderdale, Florida, United States	

== Submission grappling record ==
? Matches, ? Wins (? Submissions), ? Losses (? Submissions), 0 Draws
Result	Rec.	Opponent	Method	Event	Division	Date	Location
Win	2–1–1	(United States) Sean O'Malley	Heel Hook	Quintet Ultra		12 December 2019	
Draw	1–1–1	(United States) Anthony Johnson	Points	Quintet Ultra		12 December 2019	
Loss	1–0–1	(United States) Alexandre Ribeiro	Decision	2015 ADCC Championships	99 kg	29 August 2015	
Win	1–0–0	(United States) James Bukich	Points	2015 ADCC Championships	99 kg	29 August 2015	

== Dirty Boxing record ==
Professional record breakdown
1 match	0 wins	1 loss
By knockout	0	1

Res.	Record	Opponent	Method	Event	Date	Round	Time	Location	Notes
Loss	0–1	James Cannon	TKO (punches)	Dirty Boxing Championship 3	29 August 2025	1	0:19	Miami, Florida, USA	Dirty Boxing debut

== See also ==
- List of current UFC fighters
- List of male mixed martial artists
- List of multi-sport athletes
- List of multi-sport champions
