= Virgil Lozano =

Mexican mixed martial arts (MMA) fighter

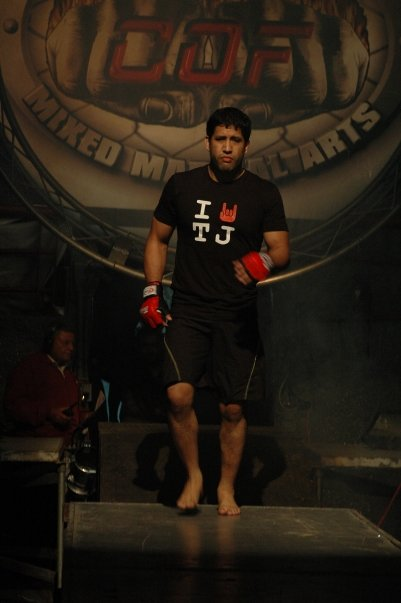
- Born: December 8, 1979 (age 46); Tijuana, Baja California, Mexico
- Other names: "The Mexican Machine"
- Height: 5 ft 11 in (1.80 m)
- Weight: 185 lb (84 kg; 13 st 3 lb)
- Division: Middleweight
- Fighting out of: Tijuana, Baja California, Mexico
- Team: Lions Den, Pitbull Gym
- Years active: 2001–present

Mixed martial arts record
- Total: 10
- Wins: 7
- By knockout: 1
- By submission: 6
- Losses: 2
- By knockout: 2
- Draws: 1

Other information
- Mixed martial arts record from Sherdog

Virgil Lozano (born December 8, 1979) is a Mexican mixed martial artist and a Pankration Athlema World Championship medalist.

Lozano was the last Middleweight Champion of the Cage of Fire and Baja Cage Fighting MMA Promotions and a former member of Ken Shamrock's Lions Den fighting team during the late 1990s, early 2000s.

== Mixed martial arts ==
In 1998 Virgil Lozano joined the now legendary Lions Den Academy, founded by UFC Hall of Famer Ken Shamrock.

In 1999 Lozano became part of the Lions Den professional MMA fighting team, which included notable fighters like Guy Mezger, Vernon White, Tra Telligman, Mikey Burnett, Pete Williams and Jerry Bohlander.

=== Professional MMA Debut ===
Lozano made his professional debut, as part of the Lions Den team, on August 10, 2001 against Yasuki Miyake from Japan. After 3 rounds the fight was declared a draw.

Originally Lozano was scheduled to fight Phil Baroni but the match was changed after another fighter was pulled out of the event due to an injury.

The fight was part of the event World Mixed Martial Arts Association 1: MegaFights, which featured Ken Shamrock vs Sam Adkins as the main event.

=== Pankration Athlema World Championships ===
Lozano participated in the Pankration Athlima World Championships in Athens, Greece. He won a bronze medal in 2000 and a silver medal in 2002.

=== MMA Fighting Challenge ===
In 2005, Lozano fought twice in the MMA Fighting Challenge in Guadalajara, Jalisco, Mexico, winning both fights; one by Submission and the other one by TKO (Doctor's stoppage).

=== Cage of Fire ===
Lozano continued his professional MMA career in Mexico for the Cage of Fire MMA Promotion. He fought as a Middleweight from 2006 to 2008. In 2007 he became the Middleweight Champion and retained the belt until the promotion was terminated in 2008.

=== Bellator Fighting Championships ===
In 2009 Lozano was invited to participate in the Bellator Fighting Championships. On April 15, 2009 Lozano fought Hector Lombard in the first round of the Middleweight Tournament at the Lloyd Noble Center in Norman, Oklahoma, United States. The fight was won by Hector Lombard via KO in the first round. Lombard went on to win the tournament and reign undefeated as the MW champion until he was signed by the UFC. The fight aired nationally in the U.S. via tape-delay the following night on Saturday, April 18, 2009 through an exclusive television agreement with ESPN.

=== Baja Cage Fighting ===
In 2010 Lozano fought in the new Baja Cage Fights MMA Promotion. On July 17, 2010 he fought against Greg Raedel for the BCF Middleweight Championship. He won the fight on the first round via Kneebar submission.

== Mixed martial arts record ==
Professional record breakdown
10 matches	7 wins	2 losses
By knockout	1	2
By submission	6	0
By decision	0	0
Draws	1	
No contests	0	

Res.	Record	Opponent	Method	Event	Date	Round	Time	Location	Notes
Win	7-2-1	(United States) Greg Raedel	Submission (kneebar)	BCF 1 - Return of the Champ	July 17, 2010	1	3:39	Tijuana, Baja California, Mexico	BF1 Championship bout.
Loss	6-2-1	(Cuba) Hector Lombard	KO (punch)	Bellator 3	April 17, 2009	1	1:10	Norman, Oklahoma, United States	Bellator Season 1 Middleweight Tournament Quarterfinal.
Win	6-1-1	(Mexico) Marcos Rodriguez	Submission (armbar)	COF 12 - Nightmare	May 3, 2008	4	2:55	Tijuana, Baja California, Mexico	COF Championship bout.
Win	5-1-1	(Mexico) Ulysses Cortez	Submission (armbar)	COF 10 - November Pain	November 24, 2007	1	4:02	Tijuana, Baja California, Mexico	COF Championship bout.
Win	4-1-1	(United States) Bill Smallwood	Submission (injury)	COF 7 - Face Off	June 23, 2007	2	2:16	Tijuana, Baja California, Mexico	
Loss	3-1-1	(Mexico) Ulysses Cortez	KO (punch)	COF 5 - Cage of Fire 5	January 27, 2007	1	0:14	Tijuana, Baja California, Mexico	
Win	3-0-1	(United States) Nicolas Hart	Submission (armbar)	COF 3 - Cage of Fire 3	September 2, 2006	1	N/A	Tijuana, Baja California, Mexico	
Win	2-0-1	(Mexico) Arturo Contreras	TKO (doctor stoppage)	MMAFC 4 - MMA Fighting Challenge 4	December 3, 2005	2	2:58	Guadalajara, Jalisco, Mexico	
Win	1-0-1	(Mexico) Miguel Huante	Submission (strikes)	MMAFC 3 - MMA Fighting Challenge 3	October 1, 2005	1	1:30	Guadalajara, Jalisco, Mexico	
Draw	0-0-1	(Japan) Yasuki Miyake	Draw	WMMAA 1: MegaFights	August 10, 2001	3	5:00	Atlantic City, New Jersey, United States	
