= Trevor Prangley =

South African mixed martial arts fighter

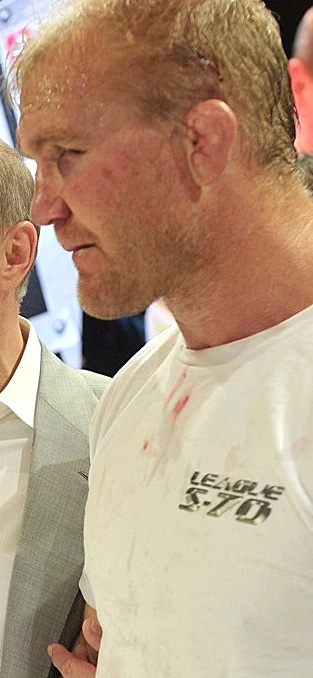
- Born: 24 August 1972 (age 54); Cape Town, South Africa
- Other names: The Fighting Pride of South Africa; The South African Hammer
- Height: 6 ft 1 in (1.85 m)
- Weight: 202.75 lb (91.97 kg; 14.482 st)
- Division: Middleweight; Light Heavyweight; Heavyweight
- Reach: 76 in (190 cm)
- Fighting out of: Coeur d'Alene, Idaho, United States
- Team: American Kickboxing Academy
- Years active: 2001–present

Mixed martial arts record
- Total: 47
- Wins: 34
- By knockout: 9
- By submission: 13
- By decision: 12
- Losses: 11
- By knockout: 5
- By submission: 3
- By decision: 3
- Draws: 2

Other information
- Mixed martial arts record from Sherdog

Trevor Prangley (born 24 August 1972) is a South African mixed martial artist. He has fought in the UFC, Strikeforce, Bellator, Dream, King of the Cage, MFC, the SFL, Shark Fights, and Bodog Fight. He competed in the Middleweight and Light Heavyweight divisions. He was the former King of the Cage Light Heavyweight Champion, the former Shark Fights Light Heavyweight Champion, and the former MFC Light Heavyweight Champion.

== Mixed martial arts career ==
=== Early life ===
Born in Cape Town, South Africa in 1972, Prangley grew up on a small farm tending horses, sheep, and chickens with his mother, father, brother, and sister. When Trevor was only 4 years old, his father asked him if he wanted to sign-up for wrestling classes at a local club.

Trevor wrestled throughout his youth in South Africa. He won numerous regional and provincial titles and at age 23 captured the national title. This brought him close to his goal of making the South African Olympic team, but he lost the qualifying match in overtime and had to settle for alternate status.

He left his family behind and headed to Coeur d'Alene, Idaho. His hope was to make the lineup and secure a scholarship at North Idaho College (NIC), a local community college. This gamble paid off. Trevor received All-American status both years at NIC. Unfortunately, during the final match of his second year while ahead on points, Trevor tore his ACL and placed runner up. Frustrated that his eligibility was gone and he had not reached his goal of becoming a national champion, Trevor considered returning home to South Africa. Those thoughts soon disappeared as he began to receive numerous scholarship offers to continue wrestling at four-year schools. He was now motivated to begin aggressive rehab.

Despite doctor's predictions that it would be nine months before being able to wrestle again, Trevor found a local Jiu-Jitsu school and began to train. Jiu-Jitsu enabled him to stay in shape and still have something to compete in while recovering. Just six months later, in 1998, he had his first amateur mixed martial arts fight. Even though he lost this fight to decision, he realized that mixed martial arts was the sport for him. He canceled his plans to resume college wrestling and went on a 19 fight winning streak before turning pro in 2001.

=== Early career ===
His pro-career started as a Light Heavyweight at 205 pounds. He achieved six straight wins before fighting Renato Sobral, his toughest fight to date. It was losing this fight that made Trevor decided to move to middleweight 185 lbs. He decided to drop to a middleweight where he could feel more comfortable and strong. This proved to be a good decision. Trevor won his first fight at 185 pounds over Andrei Semenov of Russia and secured a fight in the UFC.

=== Ultimate Fighting Championship ===
He made his debut in the UFC at UFC 48, defeating Curtis Stout by submission. He is currently 2–2 in the organization, including a close decision loss to Jeremy Horn at UFC 56. Prangley then went on to lose to Chael Sonnen at Ultimate Fight Night 4.

=== Post-UFC ===
Leaving the UFC, Prangley then fought for several organizations, including Bodog Fight, where he qualified for the USA vs. Russia card on the reality show, and defeated Andrei Seminov for a second time at the event.

Prangley defeated Yuki Kondo at BodogFIGHT: Alvarez vs. Lee via TKO (doctor stoppage) following the conclusion of the second round to win the Bodog Fight Middleweight Title.

=== Strikeforce ===
He has fought several times for Strikeforce, which included competing in the Strikeforce: Four Men Enter, One Man Survives middleweight tournament. He won a decision victory over Falaniko Vitale in the first round of the tournament, but lost to Jorge Santiago in the finals.

Prangley fought Tim Kennedy on 16 June 2010 at Strikeforce: Los Angeles. and lost by submission (rear naked choke).

After this, he faced Keith Jardine in a non-title bout at Shark Fights 13: Jardine vs. Prangley. He won via split decision.

On 29 January he fought in Strikeforce again and lost by a rear naked choke from Roger Gracie in the first round.

=== Shark fights ===
In between his time with Strikeforce Prangley competed for the Shark Fights organization and won the Light Heavyweight Championship by defeating Marcus Sursa on 28 November 2009 at Shark Fights 7.

He later fought in the main event of the Shark Fights 13 card by defeating Keith Jardine in a non-title fight on 11 September 2010.

=== Bellator ===
Prangley made his Bellator debut at Bellator 58, against Hector Lombard at the catch weight of 195. In this non-title affair, Prangley lost to Lombard via TKO in the second round.

=== Super Fight League ===
He next compete at India's Super Fight League's third event, SFL 3, against Baga Agaev. He won via third round KO. He was expected to face Sokoudjou at SFL 5 in the main event.

=== King of the Cage ===
Prangley fought Tony Lopez for the vacant KOTC Light Heavyweight Championship at KOTC: Vigilante. The fight was stopped in the fourth round after Lopez landed an illegal knee to Prangley's head and Prangley could not continue even after the 5 minutes allowed to recover. The bout then went to a technical decision where the judges scored a Majority Decision victory for Prangley.

Prangley made his fourth title defense when he faced Jared Torgeson at KOTC: Double Impact on 4 October 2013. He won the fight via unanimous decision.

In his fifth title defense, Prangley faced Jared Torgeson in a rematch at KOTC: Steadfast on 14 August 2014. Prangley won via KO in the first round.

In his sixth title defense, Prangley faced Richard Blake at KOTC: Tactical Strike on 13 November 2014. He successfully defended his title, winning by submission early in the first round.

=== Other promotions ===
Filling in for an injured Mike Kyle, Prangley faced Maxim Grishin at Fight Nights: Battle of Moscow 17 on 30 September 2014. He lost the fight via TKO in the second round.

== Personal life ==
Trevor and his wife have a son. He owns a gym in Hayden, Idaho.

== Achievements and titles ==
=== Wrestling ===
- NJCAA Division 1 Wrestler
- 2x All-American
- NJCAA National Runner-Up
- South African National Champion

=== Mixed martial arts ===
- BodogFight
  - BodogFight Middleweight Championship (One time)
- Maximum Fighting Championship
  - MFC Light Heavyweight Championship (One time)
- Shark Fights
  - Shark Fights Light Heavyweight Championship (One time)
- Super Fight League
  - Fight of the Night (One time)
- King of the Cage
  - KOTC Light Heavyweight Championship (One time)
- Strikeforce
  - Strikeforce Middleweight Tournament Runner-Up

== Mixed martial arts record ==
Professional record breakdown
47 matches	34 wins	11 losses
By knockout	9	5
By submission	13	3
By decision	12	3
Draws	2	

Res.	Record	Opponent	Method	Event	Date	Round	Time	Location	Notes
Draw	34–11–2	Mike Hayes	Draw (split)	King of the Cage: Awakening	4 June 2015	3	5:00	Worley, Idaho, United States	Heavyweight debut.
Win	34–11–1	Richard Blake	Submission (arm-triangle choke)	KOTC: Tactical Strike	13 November 2014	1	2:07	Worley, Idaho, United States	Defended the KOTC Light Heavyweight Championship
Loss	33–11–1	Maxim Grishin	TKO (punches)	Fight Nights Global: Battle of Moscow 17	30 September 2014	2	2:56	Moscow, Russia	
Win	33–10–1	Jared Torgeson	KO (punches)	KOTC: Steadfast	14 August 2014	1	1:07	Worley, Idaho, United States	Defended the KOTC Light Heavyweight Championship
Win	32–10–1	Jared Torgeson	Decision (unanimous)	KOTC: Double Impact	4 October 2013	5	5:00	Worley, Idaho, United States	Defended the KOTC Light Heavyweight Championship
Loss	31–10–1	Vyacheslav Vasilevsky	TKO (punches)	League s-70: Plotforma S -70	18 August 2013	3	2:32	Sochi, Russia	
Win	31–9–1	Tony Lopez	Submission (armbar)	KOTC: It's Personal	13 June 2013	2	3:41	Worley, Idaho, United States	Defended the KOTC Light Heavyweight Championship
Win	30–9–1	Dan Molina	Submission (kimura)	KOTC: Fighting Legends	13 April 2013	3	2:06	Oroville, California, United States	Defended the KOTC Light Heavyweight Championship
Win	29–9–1	Brandon Anderson	Submission (kimura)	KOTC: Free Fall 2	22 February 2013	1	2:54	Coeur d'Alene, Idaho, United States	Defended the KOTC Light Heavyweight Championship
Win	28–9–1	Tony Lopez	Technical Decision (majority)	KOTC: Vigilante	20 December 2012	4	1:10	Highland, California, United States	Won the vacant KOTC Light Heavyweight Championship. Illegal knee from Lopez stopped the fight.
Win	27–9–1	Mike Cook	TKO (doctor stoppage)	KOTC: Breaking Point	23 August 2012	1	5:00	Worley, Idaho, United States	Catchweight (215 lbs) bout.
Win	26–9–1	George Stork	Submission (rear-naked choke)	KOTC: Wild Card	17 May 2012	3	2:42	Worley, Idaho, United States	
Win	25–9–1	Baga Agaev	KO (punches)	Super Fight League 3	6 May 2012	3	2:03	New Delhi, Delhi, India	Catchweight (195 lbs) bout. Fight of the Night.
Loss	24–9–1	Hector Lombard	TKO (punches)	Bellator 58	19 November 2011	2	1:06	Hollywood, Florida, United States	Catchweight (195 lbs) bout.
Win	24–8–1	Tony King	KO (punch)	North Idaho Fight Night	17 September 2011	1	0:37	Idaho, United States	
Loss	23–8–1	Tatsuya Mizuno	KO (knee to the body)	Dream: Japan GP Final	16 July 2011	1	4:41	Tokyo, Japan	
Loss	23–7–1	Roger Gracie	Submission (rear-naked choke)	Strikeforce: Diaz vs. Cyborg	29 January 2011	1	4:19	San Jose, California, United States	
Win	23–6–1	Keith Jardine	Decision (split)	Shark Fights 13: Jardine vs Prangley	11 September 2010	3	5:00	Amarillo, Texas, United States	Non-title bout. Return to Light Heavyweight.
Loss	22–6–1	Tim Kennedy	Submission (rear-naked choke)	Strikeforce: Los Angeles	16 June 2010	1	3:35	Los Angeles, California, United States	
Draw	22–5–1	Karl Amoussou	Technical Draw	Strikeforce Challengers: Kaufman vs. Hashi	26 February 2010	1	4:14	San Jose, California, United States	Inadvertent eye poke rendered Amoussou unable to continue.
Win	22–5	Marcus Sursa	Submission (rear-naked choke)	Shark Fights 7: Sursa vs Prangley	28 November 2009	1	4:40	Amarillo, Texas, United States	Won the Shark Fights Light Heavyweight Championship.
Win	21–5	Dennis Reed	KO (punch)	Arena Rumble: Horn vs. Guida	12 September 2009	1	0:20	Spokane, Washington, United States	
Win	20–5	Emanuel Newton	Decision (unanimous)	MFC 21	15 May 2009	5	5:00	Enoch, Alberta, Canada	Won the MFC Light Heavyweight Championship.
Win	19–5	Isidro Gonzalez	Submission (rear-naked choke)	Professional Fighting Association: Champion vs. Champion	27 March 2009	1	3:41	Coeur D'Alene, Idaho, United States	
Win	18–5	Anthony Ruiz	Decision (unanimous)	Strikeforce: At The Mansion II	20 September 2008	3	5:00	Los Angeles, California, United States	Light Heavyweight bout.
Loss	17–5	Jorge Santiago	KO (knee to the body)	Strikeforce: Four Men Enter, One Man Survives	16 November 2007	1	2:31	San Jose, California, United States	
Win	17–4	Falaniko Vitale	Decision (referee decision)	Strikeforce: Four Men Enter, One Man Survives	16 November 2007	2	2:12	San Jose, California, United States	An inadvertent eye poke from Prangley rendered Vitale unable to continue. Fight was declared a draw; referee declared Prangley the winner.
Win	16–4	Yuki Kondo	TKO (doctor stoppage)	BodogFight: Alvarez vs Lee	14 July 2007	2	5:00	Trenton, New Jersey, United States	Won the BodogFight Middleweight Championship.
Win	15–4	Pierre Guillet	Submission (rear-naked choke)	BodogFight: Costa Rica	17 February 2007	1	1:50	Costa Rica	
Win	14–4	Andrei Semenov	Decision (unanimous)	BodogFight: USA vs Russia	2 December 2006	3	5:00	Vancouver, British Columbia, Canada	
Win	13–4	Anthony Ruiz	Submission (armbar)	Strikeforce: Tank vs. Buentello	7 October 2006	1	4:42	Fresno, California, United States	Light Heavyweight bout.
Win	12–4	Kyacey Uscola	Submission (arm-triangle)	BodogFight: Costa Rica	22 August 2006	2	0:35	Costa Rica	
Loss	11–4	Chael Sonnen	Decision (unanimous)	UFC Fight Night 4	6 April 2006	3	5:00	Las Vegas, Nevada, United States	
Loss	11–3	Jeremy Horn	Decision (unanimous)	UFC 56	19 November 2005	3	5:00	Las Vegas, Nevada, United States	
Win	11–2	Travis Lutter	Decision (unanimous)	UFC 54	20 August 2005	3	5:00	Las Vegas, Nevada, United States	
Win	10–2	Matt Horwich	Decision (unanimous)	SportFight 9: Respect	26 March 2005	3	5:00	Gresham, Oregon, United States	
Loss	9–2	Rico Hattingh	Submission (triangle choke)	African FC: All or Nothing	26 February 2005	3	4:40	Cape Town, South Africa	
Win	9–1	Curtis Stout	Submission (cobra choke)	UFC 48	19 June 2004	2	1:05	Las Vegas, Nevada, United States	
Win	8–1	Andrei Semenov	Decision (unanimous)	Euphoria: Russia vs USA	13 March 2004	3	5:00	Atlantic City, New Jersey, United States	Middleweight debut.
Win	7–1	Shane Schartzer	TKO (submission to punches)	Kickdown Classic 8	17 January 2004	1	1:31	Denver, Colorado, United States	
Loss	6–1	Renato Sobral	Decision (unanimous)	International FC: Global Domination	6 September 2003	3	5:00	Denver, Colorado, United States	
Win	6–0	Chael Sonnen	Submission (armbar)	Xtreme Fighting Alliance 5: Redemption	25 January 2003	1	2:49	West Palm Beach, Florida, United States	
Win	5–0	Manny Valera	TKO (punches)	Cage Fight Monterrey: Ultimate Fighting	26 October 2002	3	N/A	Monterrey, Mexico	
Win	4–0	Brett Shafer	Decision (unanimous)	Cage Fight Monterrey: Ultimate Fighting	26 October 2002	3	5:00	Monterrey, Mexico	
Win	3–0	Kyle Seals	Decision (unanimous)	Ultimate Athlete 3: Vengeance	10 August 2002	3	5:00	Denver, Colorado, United States	
Win	2–0	Darcy Landcaster	KO (punches)	Gladiators Vale Tudo	10 March 2001	1	N/A	Worley, Idaho, United States	
Win	1–0	Joe Garcia	Submission (kneebar)	Bushido 1	18 January 2001	1	N/A	Tempe, Arizona, United States	

== See also ==
- List of current mixed martial arts champions
- List of male mixed martial artists
