= Strikeforce: At The Mansion II =

Strikeforce mixed martial arts event in 2008

Strikeforce: At the Mansion II
- The poster for Strikeforce: At the Mansion II
- Promotion: Strikeforce
- Date: September 20, 2008
- Venue: Playboy Mansion
- City: Beverly Hills, California, United States
- Attendance: 2,478

Event chronology
Strikeforce: Young Guns III	Strikeforce: At the Mansion II	Strikeforce: Payback

Strikeforce: At the Mansion II was a mixed martial arts event held on September 20, 2008. The event took place at the Playboy Mansion in Beverly Hills, California. In addition to the event, all guests were entitled to a top-shelf, open bar; buffet-style, gourmet dinner; and wine tasting party featuring the spirits of various California gold medal wineries.

== Results ==
Main Card
Weight class				Method	Round	Time	Notes
Light Heavyweight	Trevor Prangley	def.	Anthony Ruiz	Decision (unanimous) (29–28, 30–27, 30–26)	3	5:00
Lightweight	Mitsuhiro Ishida	def.	Justin Wilcox	Submission (armbar)	1	1:21
Middleweight	Terry Martin	def.	Cory Devela	TKO (strikes)	3	2:08
Lightweight	Josh Thomson	def.	Ashe Bowman	TKO (punches)	1	1:14
Middleweight	Kazuo Misaki	def.	Joe Riggs	TKO (punches)	2	2:29
Preliminary card
Welterweight	Luke Stewart	def.	Jesse Juarez	Submission (armbar)	1	4:55
Middleweight	Eric Lawson	def.	Kenneth Seegrist	Submission (rear-naked choke)	1	3:07
Welterweight	Brandon Magana	def.	Brandon Thatch	Decision (split) (29–28, 28–29, 29–28)	3	3:00
Catchweight (195 lb)	Jesse Gillespie	def.	Dave Martin	Decision (split) (27–30, 29–28, 29–28)	3	3:00

== Fighter payroll ==
Purse amounts were provided by the California State Athletic Commission, and include amounts for show and win. The figures do not include any undisclosed bonuses:

- Kazuo Misaki ($1,400/win bonus was undisclosed) def. Joe Riggs ($20,000)
- Josh Thomson $40,000 ($20,000 + $20,000 win bonus) def. Ashe Bowman ($2,000)
- Terry Martin ($10,000) def. Cory Devela ($10,000)
- Mitsuhiro Ishida ($1,400/win bonus was undisclosed) def. Justin Wilcox ($5,000)
- Luke Stewart ($8,000) def. Jesse Juarez ($2,000)
- Eric Lawson ($6,000/win bonus was $500) def. Kenneth Seagrist ($2,000)
- Brandon Magana ($2,000) def. Brandon Thatch ($2,000)
- Jesse Gillespie ($2,000/win bonus was $1,000) def. Dave Martin ($1,000)

Total Disclosed fighter payroll:$159,000

== See also ==
- Strikeforce (mixed martial arts)
- List of Strikeforce champions
- List of Strikeforce events
- 2008 in Strikeforce
