= Jorge Santiago =

Brazilian mixed martial arts fighter (born 1980)

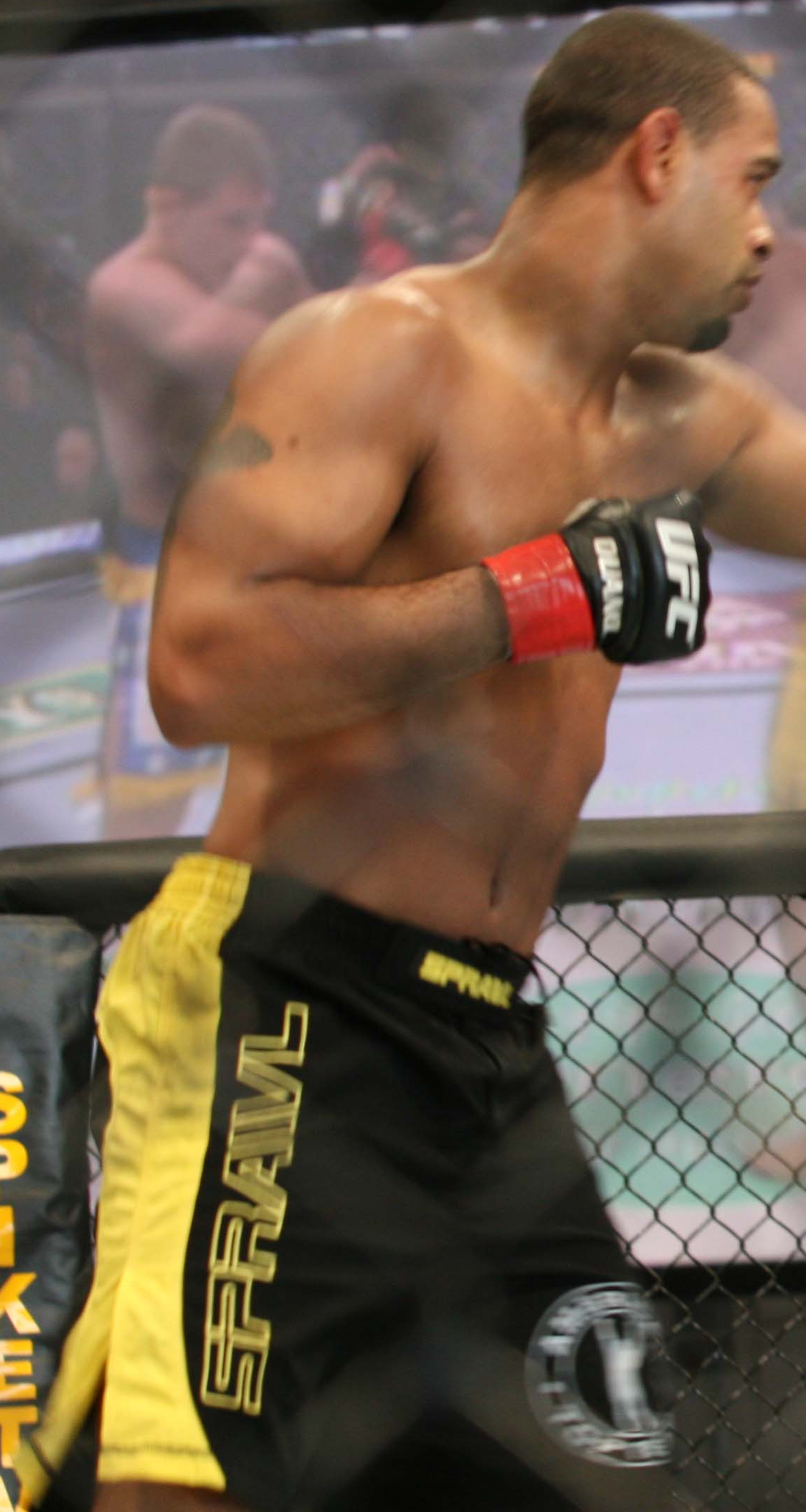
- Born: October 9, 1980 (age 46); Rio de Janeiro, Brazil
- Other names: The Sandman
- Height: 6 ft 1 in (1.85 m)
- Weight: 170 lb (77 kg; 12 st 2 lb)
- Division: Welterweight (2002–2005, 2013); Middleweight (2005–2013)
- Reach: 74 in (190 cm)
- Fighting out of: Boca Raton, Florida
- Team: Blackzilians
- Rank: Black belt in Brazilian jiu-jitsu under Ricardo Liborio
- Years active: 2002–2013

Mixed martial arts record
- Total: 37
- Wins: 25
- By knockout: 10
- By submission: 13
- By decision: 2
- Losses: 12
- By knockout: 6
- By decision: 6

Other information
- Mixed martial arts record from Sherdog

Jorge Santiago Rodrigues (Portuguese pronunciation: [ˈʒɔʁʒi sɐ̃tʃiˈaɡu]; born October 9, 1980) is a retired Brazilian mixed martial artist. He was the first Sengoku Middleweight Champion and is the former Strikeforce Middleweight Grand Prix Champion. He has also competed for the UFC, King of the Cage, Titan FC, It's Showtime, and BodogFIGHT.

== Mixed martial arts career ==
=== Early career ===
Santiago started his mixed martial arts career at Reality Fighting 2 in 2002 with a win over Jose Rodriguez. In the following years Santago fought for Absolute Fighting Championships, King of the Cage, and a few other small organizations earning an 11–5 record.

=== Ultimate Fighting Championship ===
In 2006 he signed with Ultimate Fighting Championships, where he competed three times. He won his UFC debut at UFC Ultimate Fight Night 5 against Justin Levens by first round KO. He returned at UFC Fight Night 6 and UFC Fight Night 7, losing by KO to former WEC Middleweight Champion, Chris Leben in the second round and to Alan Belcher by KO in the third round. He then left the UFC.

=== Strikeforce ===
In his first fight after leaving the UFC, Santiago was victorious against Andrei Semenov at the Bodog Fight: Clash of the Nations show in Russia. In his next fight he had to deal with longtime veteran Jeremy Horn and submitted Horn in the first round.

The next challenge for Santiago was the Strikeforce Middleweight tournament on November 16, 2007. Competing in the tournament as the underdog, Santiago won the Grand Prix by defeating Sean Salmon and Trevor Prangley on the same night.

=== Sengoku ===
Continuing on his path of success, Santiago became Middleweight Champion, by defeating Yuki Sasaki, Logan Clark, Siyar Bahadurzada, and Kazuhiro Nakamura. The last two fights were on the same night.

Santiago was then crowned World Victory Road's first Middleweight Champion by defeating the acclaimed Kazuo Misaki at World Victory Road Presents: Sengoku no Ran 2009.

He was set to face former UFC 12 Heavyweight Tournament Champion and former UFC Light Heavyweight Champion, Vitor Belfort at Affliction: Trilogy, but the match was scrapped after the cancellation of the event.

Santiago then fought at World Victory Road Presents: Sengoku 11 against current KSW Middleweight Champion, Mamed Khalidov in a non-title bout. Khalidov won by first round knockout; Santiago's first loss since 2006. He avenged this loss in March 2010 with a split decision victory over Khalidov at Sengoku 12.

Santiago defended his title for a second time when he defeated Kazuo Misaki via TKO at Sengoku 14 in August 2010.

=== Return to UFC ===
On February 8, 2011, Santiago requested and was granted his release from World Victory Road. On February 16, he signed a multi-fight contract to return to the Ultimate Fighting Championship.

Santiago lost in his UFC return to former WEC Light Heavyweight Champion Brian Stann at UFC 130 via TKO in the second round.

Santiago then lost by unanimous decision to Brazilian jiu-jitsu specialist Demian Maia at UFC 136.

Following the loss to Maia, Santiago was released from the promotion.

=== Post-UFC ===
On March 2, 2012, Santiago won his return fight, knocking out Leonardo Pecanha with a straight right at 1:48 in the first round at Titan Fighting Championships 21 On June 15, 2012 Santiago fought Justin Guthrie at Titan Fighting Championship 23 winning the fight via submission in the first round.

=== Strikeforce ===
Santiago was re-signed by Strikeforce (now owned by the UFC's parent company Zuffa, LLC) in August 2012, where he was expected to drop to Welterweight for a bout with former King of the Cage Welterweight Champion Quinn Mulhern at Strikeforce: Melendez vs. Healy on September 29, 2012. However, the event was cancelled the following month due to an injury to headliner Gilbert Melendez, and the Santiago/Mulhern bout was not rescheduled before Strikeforce's closure and absorption into the UFC in January 2013.

=== Third UFC Stint ===
Already signed with Strikeforce, and following his own back-to-back wins outside the organization, Santiago was called back to the UFC to take on Gunnar Nelson in a welterweight bout on February 16, 2013 at UFC on Fuel TV: Barão vs. McDonald, replacing an injured Justin Edwards. Santiago lost the fight via unanimous decision and was subsequently released from the promotion for the third time.

=== World Series of Fighting ===
Santiago signed with World Series of Fighting in 2013 and made his promotional debut on August 10, 2013 against Gerald Harris at WSOF 4. The bout had a confusing first round where Harris slammed Santiago and Harris believed he had tapped. However, the referee was stopping the action to deduct a point from Santiago for blatantly grabbing the cage during Harris' slam. Following the confusion, the fight continued and Santiago would go on to lose via unanimous decision.

Jorge Santiago announced on Dec. 14, 2013 to Ariel Helwani that he has retired from MMA competition.

== Brazilian jiu-jitsu lineage ==
Mitsuyo "Count Koma" Maeda → Carlos Gracie, Sr. → Carlson Gracie → Ricardo Liborio → Jorge Santiago

== Personal life ==
Santiago is married. He has a daughter from a previous relationship.

== Championships and accomplishments ==
- Strikeforce
  - 2007 Strikeforce Middleweight Grand Prix Champion
- Ultimate Fighting Championship
  - Fight of the Night (One time)
- Sengoku Raiden Championship
  - Sengoku Middleweight Championship (One time, First)
  - 2008 Sengoku Middleweight Grand Prix Champion
- Sherdog
  - 2010 Fight of the Year vs. Kazuo Misaki
- Inside MMA
  - 2010 Bazzie Award for Fight of the Year vs. Kazuo Misaki
- Bleacher Report
  - 2010 Fight of the Year vs. Kazuo Misaki

== Mixed martial arts record ==
Professional record breakdown
37 matches	25 wins	12 losses
By knockout	10	6
By submission	13	0
By decision	2	6

Res.	Record	Opponent	Method	Event	Date	Round	Time	Location	Notes
Loss	25–12	Gerald Harris	Decision (unanimous)	WSOF 4	August 10, 2013	3	5:00	Ontario, California, United States	
Loss	25–11	Gunnar Nelson	Decision (unanimous)	UFC on Fuel TV: Barão vs. McDonald	February 16, 2013	3	5:00	London, England, United Kingdom	
Win	25–10	Justin Guthrie	Submission (inverted heel hook)	TFC 23	June 15, 2012	1	1:34	Fort Riley, Kansas, United States	
Win	24–10	Leonardo Pecanha	KO (punches)	TFC 21	March 2, 2012	1	1:48	Kansas City, Kansas, United States	
Loss	23–10	Demian Maia	Decision (unanimous)	UFC 136	October 8, 2011	3	5:00	Houston, Texas, United States	
Loss	23–9	Brian Stann	KO (punches)	UFC 130	May 28, 2011	2	4:29	Las Vegas, Nevada, United States	Fight of the Night.
Win	23–8	Kazuo Misaki	TKO (corner stoppage)	World Victory Road Presents: Sengoku Raiden Championships 14	August 22, 2010	5	4:31	Tokyo, Japan	Defended the Sengoku Middleweight Championship.
Win	22–8	Mamed Khalidov	Decision (split)	World Victory Road Presents: Sengoku Raiden Championships 12	March 7, 2010	5	5:00	Tokyo, Japan	Defended the Sengoku Middleweight Championship.
Loss	21–8	Mamed Khalidov	KO (punches)	World Victory Road Presents: Sengoku 11	November 7, 2009	1	2:45	Tokyo, Japan	Non-title bout.
Win	21–7	Kazuo Misaki	Technical Submission (rear-naked choke)	World Victory Road Presents: Sengoku no Ran 2009	January 4, 2009	5	3:26	Saitama, Japan	Won the Sengoku Middleweight Championship.
Win	20–7	Kazuhiro Nakamura	KO (punches)	World Victory Road Presents: Sengoku 6	November 1, 2008	3	0:49	Saitama, Japan	Sengoku Middleweight Grandprix 2008 Final.
Win	19–7	Siyar Bahadurzada	Submission (heel hook)	World Victory Road Presents: Sengoku 6	November 1, 2008	1	1:10	Saitama, Japan	Sengoku Middleweight Grandprix 2008 Semifinal.
Win	18–7	Logan Clark	Submission (arm-triangle choke)	World Victory Road Presents: Sengoku 5	September 28, 2008	2	3:55	Tokyo, Japan	Sengoku Middleweight Grandprix 2008 Opening Round.
Win	17–7	Yuki Sasaki	Submission (armbar)	World Victory Road Presents: Sengoku 2	May 18, 2008	3	2:10	Tokyo, Japan	
Win	16–7	Trevor Prangley	TKO (knee to the body)	Strikeforce: Four Men Enter, One Man Survives	November 16, 2007	1	2:31	San Jose, California, United States	Won the Strikeforce Middleweight Grand Prix.
Win	15–7	Sean Salmon	KO (flying knee)	Strikeforce: Four Men Enter, One Man Survives	November 16, 2007	1	0:24	San Jose, California, United States	Strikeforce Middleweight Grand Prix Semifinal.
Win	14–7	Jeremy Horn	Submission (triangle choke)	Art of War 3: Monson vs. Rizzo	September 1, 2007	1	3:02	Dallas, Texas, United States	
Win	13–7	Andrei Semenov	TKO (punches)	Bodog Fight: Clash of the Nations	April 14, 2007	2	4:48	St. Petersburg, Russia	
Loss	12–7	Alan Belcher	KO (head kick)	UFC Fight Night: Sanchez vs. Riggs	December 13, 2006	3	2:45	San Diego, California, United States	
Loss	12–6	Chris Leben	KO (punch)	UFC Fight Night 6	August 17, 2006	2	0:35	Las Vegas, Nevada, United States	
Win	12–5	Justin Levens	KO (knee and punches)	UFC Fight Night 5	June 28, 2006	1	2:13	Las Vegas, Nevada, United States	
Win	11–5	Thomas Russell	Submission (armbar)	Fightfest 3	May 6, 2006	1	1:59	Youngstown, Ohio, United States	
Win	10–5	Sydney Machado	TKO (punches)	Costa Rica: Fights 3	December 2, 2005	2	0:49	Costa Rica	
Win	9–5	Leopoldo Serao	TKO (punches)	Full Throttle 5	November 4, 2005	1	0:43	Georgia, United States	
Loss	8–5	Joey Villaseñor	Decision (unanimous)	KOTC 58: Prime Time	August 5, 2005	3	5:00	San Jacinto, California, United States	For the KOTC Middleweight Championship.
Loss	8–4	Jordan Radev	Decision (unanimous)	It's Showtime: Amsterdam Arena	June 12, 2005	2	5:00	Amsterdam, Holland	Debut at Middleweight
Win	8–3	Chris Liguori	Submission (rear-naked choke)	Euphoria: USA vs World	February 26, 2005	1	3:27	Atlantic City, New Jersey, United States	
Loss	7–3	Diego Sanchez	Decision (unanimous)	KOTC 37: Unfinished Business	June 12, 2004	3	5:00	San Jacinto, California, United States	For the vacant KOTC Welterweight Championship.
Win	7–2	Takuya Wada	Submission (armbar)	Absolute Fighting Championships 7	February 27, 2004	1	1:52	Fort Lauderdale, Florida, United States	
Win	6–2	John Cronk	Submission (armbar)	KOTC 32: Bringing Heat	January 24, 2004	2	0:54	Miami, Florida, United States	
Loss	5–2	Keith Wisniewski	KO (punches)	Absolute Fighting Championships 6	December 6, 2003	3	2:14	Fort Lauderdale, Florida, United States	
Win	5–1	LaVerne Clark	Submission (triangle choke)	Hardcore Fighting Championships 2	October 18, 2003	1	2:17	Revere, Massachusetts, United States	
Win	4–1	Derrick Noble	Decision (unanimous)	Absolute Fighting Championships 5	September 5, 2003	2	5:00	Fort Lauderdale, Florida, United States	
Loss	3–1	Manny Gamburyan	KO (punch)	KOTC 27: Aftermath	August 10, 2003	1	0:21	San Jacinto, California, United States	
Win	3–0	Justin Wieman	Submission (triangle choke)	Absolute Fighting Championships 4	July 19, 2003	1	4:11	Fort Lauderdale, Florida, United States	
Win	2–0	Jay Martin	KO (punches)	HOOKnSHOOT: Boot Camp 1.1	March 8, 2003	1	0:14	Evansville, Indiana, United States	
Win	1–0	Jose Rodriguez	Submission (knees)	Reality Fighting 2	November 2, 2002	1	1:16	Wildwood, New Jersey, United States	

New championship	1st Sengoku Middleweight Champion; January 4, 2009 – February 8, 2011	Vacant
