= Strikeforce: Diaz vs. Cyborg =

Strikeforce mixed martial arts event in 2011

- The poster for Strikeforce: Diaz vs. Cyborg
- Promotion: Strikeforce
- Date: January 29, 2011
- Venue: HP Pavilion
- City: San Jose, California, United States
- Attendance: 9,059

Event chronology
Strikeforce: Henderson vs. Babalu II	Strikeforce: Diaz vs. Cyborg	Strikeforce: Fedor vs. Silva

Strikeforce: Diaz vs. Cyborg was a mixed martial arts event that was held by Strikeforce on January 29, 2011 at the HP Pavilion in San Jose, California, United States.

== Background ==
A welterweight bout between Nate Coy and Nate Moore, which was originally scheduled to take place at ShoMMA 13, took place at this event.

Six of the preliminary card fights were streamed live on Sherdog.com.

This was the last Strikeforce event to feature amateur bouts, which were removed from all future Strikeforce cards following the promotion's sale to Zuffa, LLC in March 2011.

Strikeforce Challengers color commentator Pat Miletich filled in for the absent Gus Johnson on the live broadcast of this card.

The event drew an estimated 561,000 viewers, with a peak at 850,000 on Showtime.

== Results ==
Main card
Weight class				Method	Round	Time	Notes
Welterweight	Nick Diaz (c)	def.	Evangelista Santos	Submission (armbar)	2	4:50	(Note: For the Strikeforce Welterweight Championship.)
Middleweight	Ronaldo Souza (c)	def.	Robbie Lawler	Submission (rear naked choke)	3	2:00	(Note: For the Strikeforce Middleweight Championship.)
Heavyweight	Herschel Walker	def.	Scott Carson	TKO (strikes)	1	3:13
Light Heavyweight	Roger Gracie	def.	Trevor Prangley	Submission (rear-naked choke)	1	4:19
Sherdog.com live stream
Welterweight	James Terry	def.	Lucas Gamaza	TKO (strikes)	1	3:26
Women's Bantamweight	Germaine de Randamie	def.	Stephanie Webber	KO (knee)	1	4:25
Welterweight	Nate Moore	def.	Nathan Coy	KO (punches)	2	0:25
Preliminary card
Women's Flyweight	Jenna Castillo	def.	Charlene Gellner	TKO (strikes)	2	3:57
Lightweight	Isaiah Hill	def.	Bobby Stack	Submission (triangle choke)	1	1:02
Catchweight (180 lb)	Ron Keslar	def.	Eric Lawson	Submission (armbar)	1	1:57
Welterweight	Armin Safiari	def.	Sam Bracamonte	Decision (unanimous)	3	5:00
Catchweight (165 lb)	Ricky Jackson	def.	Nikko Jackson	Decision (unanimous)	3	5:00
Catchweight (150 lb)	Anthony Dariano	def.	Alan Perez	Decision (unanimous)	3	5:00

== Fighter salaries ==
Champ Nick Diaz: $150,000 (no win bonus) def. Evangelista "Cyborg" Santos: $20,000

Champ Ronaldo "Jacare" Souza: $85,000 ($15,000 win bonus) def. Robbie Lawler : $65,000

Herschel Walker: $5,000 (no win bonus) def. Scott Carson: $5,000

Roger Gracie: $75,000 (no win bonus) def. Trevor Prangley: $30,000

Nate Moore: $4,000 ($2,000 win bonus) def. Nathan Coy: $3,000

Isaiah Hill: $3,000 ($1,500 win bonus) def. Bobby Stack: $1,500

Ron Keslar: $3,000 ($1,500 win bonus) def. Eric Lawson: $1,500

Germaine de Randamie: $3,000 ($1,000 win bonus) def. Stephanie Webber: $1,000

James Terry: $3,000 ($1,500 win bonus) def. Lucas Gamaza: $1,500

Jenna Castillo: $3,000 ($1,500 win bonus) def. Charlene Gellner: $1,000
