= 2008 in DREAM =

Mixed martial arts events

Information
- First date: March 15, 2008
- Last date: December 31, 2008

Events
- Total events: 7

Fights
- Total fights: 66
- Title fights: 2

Chronology
| 2008 in DREAM | 2009 in DREAM |

The year 2008 was the 1st year in the history of DREAM, a mixed martial arts promotion based in Japan. In 2008 DREAM held 7 events beginning with, Dream 1: Lightweight Grand Prix 2008 First Round.

== Title fights ==
Title fights in 2008
| Weight class | | | | Method | Round | Time | Event | Notes |
|---|---|---|---|---|---|---|---|---|
| Lightweight | Joachim Hansen | def. | Shinya Aoki | TKO (Punches) | 1 | 4:19 | Dream 5: Lightweight Grand Prix 2008 Final | (Note: For the Dream Lightweight Championship.) |
| Middleweight | Gegard Mousasi | def. | Ronaldo Souza | KO (Upkick) | 1 | 2:15 | Dream 6: Middleweight Grand Prix 2008 Final | (Note: For the Dream Middleweight Championship.) |

== Events list ==
| # | Event title | Date | Arena | Location | Attendees | Broadcast |
|---|---|---|---|---|---|---|
| 7 | Fields Dynamite!! 2008 | December 31, 2008 | Saitama Super Arena | Saitama, Saitama, Japan | 25,634 | Tokyo Broadcasting System; HDNet |
| 6 | Dream 6: Middleweight Grand Prix 2008 Final Round | September 23, 2008 | Saitama Super Arena | Saitama, Saitama, Japan | 20,929 | SkyPerfect; HDNet |
| 5 | Dream 5: Lightweight Grand Prix 2008 Final Round | July 21, 2008 | Osaka-jo Hall | Osaka, Osaka, Japan | 11,986 | SkyPerfect; HDNet |
| 4 | Dream 4: Middleweight Grand Prix 2008 Second Round | June 15, 2008 | Yokohama Arena | Yokohama, Kanagawa, Japan | 14,037 | SkyPerfect; HDNet |
| 3 | Dream 3: Lightweight Grand Prix 2008 Second Round | May 11, 2008 | Saitama Super Arena | Saitama, Saitama, Japan | 21,789 | SkyPerfect; HDNet |
| 2 | Dream 2: Middleweight Grand Prix 2008 First Round | April 29, 2008 | Saitama Super Arena | Saitama, Saitama, Japan | 21,397 | SkyPerfect; HDNet |
| 1 | Dream 1: Lightweight Grand Prix 2008 First Round | March 15, 2008 | Saitama Super Arena | Saitama, Saitama, Japan | 19,120 | Tokyo Broadcasting System; HDNet |

== Dream 1: Lightweight Grand Prix 2008 Opening Round ==
Dream 1: Lightweight Grand Prix 2008 Opening Round was an event held on March 15, 2008, at the Saitama Super Arena in Saitama, Saitama, Japan.

=== Results ===
Main Card
| Weight class | | | | Method | Round | Time | Notes |
|---|---|---|---|---|---|---|---|
| Heavyweight | Mirko Filipovic | def. | Tatsuya Mizuno | TKO (punches) | 1 | 0:56 |
| Welterweight | Hayato Sakurai | def. | Hidetaka Monma | TKO (punches) | 1 | 4:12 |
| Heavyweight | Ikuhisa Minowa | def. | Kwan Bum Lee | Submission (kneebar) | 1 | 1:25 |
Lightweight Grandprix 1st Round
| Lightweight | Gesias Cavalcante | vs. | Shinya Aoki | NC (Aoki injured by illegal elbows) | 1 | 3:46 |
| Lightweight | Tatsuya Kawajiri | def. | Kultar Gill | Decision (unanimous) | 2 | 5:00 |
| Lightweight | Eddie Alvarez | def. | André Amado | TKO (punches) | 1 | 6:47 |
| Lightweight | Mitsuhiro Ishida | def. | Jung Bu-kyung | Decision (unanimous) | 2 | 5:00 |
| Lightweight | Katsuhiko Nagata | def. | Artur Oumakhanov | Decision (unanimous) | 2 | 5:00 |
| Lightweight | Luiz Firmino | def. | Kazuyuki Miyata | Submission (rear-naked choke) | 1 | 7:37 |
| Lightweight | Joachim Hansen | def. | Kotetsu Boku | Decision (unanimous) | 2 | 5:00 |

== Dream 2: Middleweight Grand Prix 2008 Opening Round ==
Dream 2: Middleweight Grand Prix 2008 Opening Round was an event held on April 29, 2008, at the Saitama Super Arena in Saitama, Saitama, Japan.

=== Results ===
Middleweight Grand Prix 1st Round
| Weight class | | | | Method | Round | Time | Notes |
|---|---|---|---|---|---|---|---|
| Middleweight | Kazushi Sakuraba | def. | Andrews Nakahara | Submission (neck crank) | 1 | 8:20 |
| Middleweight | Gegard Mousasi | def. | Denis Kang | Submission (triangle choke) | 1 | 3:10 |
| Middleweight | Kiyoshi Tamura | def. | Masakatsu Funaki | TKO (punches) | 1 | 0:57 |
| Middleweight | Ronaldo Souza | def. | Ian Murphy | Submission (rear-naked choke) | 1 | 3:38 |
| Middleweight | Zelg Galesic | def. | Magomed Sultanakhmedov | Submission (armbar) | 1 | 1:40 |
| Middleweight | Dong Sik Yoon | def. | Shungo Oyama | Decision (unanimous) | 2 | 5:00 |
| Middleweight | Taiei Kin | def. | Ikuhisa Minowa | Decision (unanimous) | 2 | 5:00 |
Lightweight Grandprix 1st Round
| Lightweight | Shinya Aoki | def. | Gesias Cavalcante | Decision (unanimous) | 2 | 5:00 |

== Dream 3: Lightweight Grand Prix 2008 Quarterfinals ==
Dream 3: Lightweight Grand Prix 2008 Quarterfinals was an event held on May 11, 2008, at the Saitama Super Arena in Saitama, Saitama, Japan.

=== Results ===
Lightweight Grand Prix 2nd Round
| Weight class | | | | Method | Round | Time | Notes |
|---|---|---|---|---|---|---|---|
| Lightweight | Caol Uno | def. | Mitsuhiro Ishida | Submission (rear-naked choke) | 2 | 1:39 |
| Lightweight | Eddie Alvarez | def. | Joachim Hansen | Decision (unanimous) | 2 | 5:00 |
| Lightweight | Tatsuya Kawajiri | def. | Luiz Firmino | Decision (unanimous) | 2 | 5:00 |
Welterweight Championship eliminator
| Welterweight | Nick Diaz | def. | Katsuya Inoue | TKO (corner stoppage) | 1 | 6:45 |
Middleweight Grand Prix reserve bout
| Middleweight | Melvin Manhoef | def. | Dae Won Kim | TKO (knees and punches) | 1 | 4:08 |
Middleweight Grand Prix 1st Round
| Middleweight | Jason Miller | def. | Katsuyori Shibata | TKO (punches) | 1 | 6:57 |
Undercard
| Lightweight | Daisuke Nakamura | def. | Jung Bu-kyung | KO (punch) | 2 | 1:05 |
| Featherweight | Takeshi Yamazaki | def. | Shoji Maruyama | Decision (unanimous) | 2 | 5:00 |

== Dream 4: Middleweight Grand Prix 2008 Quarterfinals ==
Dream 4: Middleweight Grand Prix 2008 Quarterfinals was an event held on June 15, 2008, at the Yokohama Arena in Yokohama, Kanagawa, Japan.

=== Results ===
Main Card
| Weight class | | | | Method | Round | Time | Notes |
|---|---|---|---|---|---|---|---|
| Featherweight | Hideo Tokoro | def. | Darren Uyenoyama | Decision (unanimous) | 2 | 5:00 |
| Heavyweight | Ralek Gracie | def. | Alavutdin Gadjiev | Submission (armbar) | 1 | 3:02 |
| Heavyweight | Alistair Overeem | def. | Tae Hyun Lee | KO (punches) | 1 | 0:36 |
Middleweight Grand Prix 2008 2nd Round
| Middleweight | Melvin Manhoef | def. | Kazushi Sakuraba | TKO (punches) | 1 | 1:30 |
| Middleweight | Ronaldo Souza | def. | Jason Miller | Decision (unanimous) | 2 | 5:00 |
| Middleweight | Zelg Galesic | def. | Taiei Kin | TKO (elbow injury) | 1 | 1:05 |
| Middleweight | Gegard Mousasi | def. | Dong Sik Yoon | Decision (unanimous) | 2 | 5:00 |
Light Weight Grand Prix 2008 2nd Round
| Lightweight | Shinya Aoki | def. | Katsuhiko Nagata | Submission (gogoplata) | 1 | 5:12 |

== Dream 5: Lightweight Grand Prix 2008 Final ==
Dream 5: Lightweight Grand Prix 2008 Final was an event held on July 21, 2008, at Osaka-jo Hall in Osaka, Osaka, Japan.

=== Results ===
Lightweight Grand Prix Final
| Weight class | | | | Method | Round | Time | Notes |
|---|---|---|---|---|---|---|---|
| Lightweight | Joachim Hansen | def. | Shinya Aoki | TKO (punches) | 1 | 4:19 |
Main Card
| Heavyweight | Alistair Overeem | def. | Mark Hunt | Submission (keylock) | 1 | 1:11 |
| Middleweight | Yoshihiro Akiyama | def. | Katsuyori Shibata | Submission (ezekiel choke) | 1 | 6:34 |
| Featherweight | Hideo Tokoro | def. | Takeshi Yamazaki | Decision (unanimous) | 2 | 5:00 |
| Welterweight | Kuniyoshi Hironaka | def. | Motoki Miyazawa | TKO (doctor stoppage) | 1 | 8:57 |
| Featherweight | Joseph Benavidez | def. | Junya Kodo | Submission (guillotine choke) | 1 | 2:42 |
Lightweight Grand Prix reserve match
| Lightweight | Joachim Hansen | def. | Kultar Gill | Submission (armbar) | 1 | 2:33 |
Lightweight Grand Prix Semi Final
| Lightweight | Eddie Alvarez | def. | Tatsuya Kawajiri | TKO (punches) | 1 | 7:35 |
| Lightweight | Shinya Aoki | def. | Caol Uno | Decision (unanimous) | 2 | 5:00 |
Undercard
| Lightweight | Daisuke Nakamura | def. | Andy Ologun | Submission (flying armbar) | 1 | 3:41 |

== Dream 6: Middleweight Grand Prix 2008 Final ==
Dream 6: Middleweight Grand Prix 2008 Final was an event held on September 23, 2008, at the Saitama Super Arena in Saitama, Saitama, Japan.

=== Results ===
Middleweight Grand Prix 2008 Final
| Weight class | | | | Method | Round | Time | Notes |
|---|---|---|---|---|---|---|---|
| Middleweight | Gegard Mousasi | def. | Ronaldo Souza | KO (upkick) | 1 | 2:15 |
Main Card
| Heavyweight | Alistair Overeem | vs. | Mirko Filipovic | No Contest (knee to the groin) | 1 | 6:09 |
| Lightweight | Shinya Aoki | def. | Todd Moore | Submission (neck crank) | 1 | 1:10 |
| Middleweight | Yoshihiro Akiyama | def. | Masanori Tonooka | Submission (armbar) | 1 | 6:26 |
| Welterweight | Hayato Sakurai | def. | Kuniyoshi Hironaka | Decision (unanimous) | 2 | 5:00 |
| Middleweight | Masakatsu Funaki | def. | Ikuhisa Minowa | Submission (heel hook) | 1 | 0:52 |
| Featherweight | Atsushi Yamamoto | def. | Hideo Tokoro | Decision (unanimous) | 2 | 5:00 |
| Heavyweight | Sergei Kharitonov | def. | Jimmy Ambriz | Submission (punches) | 1 | 2:15 |
| Lightweight | Keita Nakamura | def. | Adriano Martins | Decision (split) | 2 | 5:00 |
Middleweight Grand Prix Semi final
| Middleweight | Ronaldo Souza | def. | Zelg Galesic | Submission (armbar) | 1 | 1:27 |
| Middleweight | Gegard Mousasi | def. | Melvin Manhoef | Submission (triangle choke) | 1 | 1:28 |
Middleweight Grand Prix reserve bout
| Middleweight | Andrews Nakahara | def. | Dong Sik Yoon | TKO (punches) | 2 | 0:30 |

== Fields Dynamite!! 2008 ==
Fields Dynamite!! 2008 was an event held on December 31, 2008, at the Saitama Super Arena in Saitama, Saitama, Japan.

=== Results ===
DREAM MMA Rules
| Weight class | | | | Method | Round | Time | Notes |
|---|---|---|---|---|---|---|---|
| Middleweight | Kiyoshi Tamura | def. | Kazushi Sakuraba | two-round unanimous decision 3-0 (20-18, 20-18, 20-18) | 2 | 5:00 |
| Lightweight | Shinya Aoki | def. | Eddie Alvarez | Submission (heel hook) | 1 | 1:32 | (Note: For the WAMMA Lightweight Champion.) |
| Heavyweight | Melvin Manhoef | def. | Mark Hunt | KO (punches) | 1 | 0:18 |
| Heavyweight | Mirko Filipovic | def. | Hong Man Choi | TKO (leg kick) | 1 | 6:32 |
| Welterweight | Hayato "Mach" Sakurai | def. | Katsuyori Shibata | TKO (referee stoppage) | 1 | 7:02 |
| Heavyweight | Semmy Schilt | def. | Mighty Mo | Submission (triangle choke) | 1 | 5:31 |
| Heavyweight | Bob Sapp | def. | Kinniku Mantaro (Akihito Tanaka) | TKO (punches) | 1 | 5:22 | (Note: Produced by DJ OZMA featuring YUDETAMAGO.) |
| Welterweight | Andy Ologun | def. | Yukio Sakaguchi | KO (punches) | 1 | 3:52 |
| Featherweight | Daisuke Nakamura | def. | Hideo Tokoro | Submission (armbar) | 1 | 2:23 |
| Middleweight | Minowaman | def. | Errol Zimmerman | Submission (toe hold) | 1 | 1:01 |
K-1 Rules
| Heavyweight | Gegard Mousasi | def. | Musashi | TKO (referee stoppage) | 1 | 2:32 |
| Heavyweight | Alistair Overeem | def. | Badr Hari | KO (right hook) | 1 | 2:07 |
| Welterweight | Tatsuya Kawajiri | def. | Kozo Takeda | KO | 1 | 2:37 |
| Welterweight | Artur Kyshenko | def. | Yoshihiro Sato | majority decision, 2-0 (30-29, 29-28, 29-29) | 3 | 5:00 |
K-1 Rules, K-1 KOSHIEN Under 18 Tournament – Final
| | HIROYA | def. | Koya Urabe | extra round unanimous decision, 3-0 | 3 | 5:00 |
K-1 Rules, K-1 KOSHIEN Under 18 Tournament – Semi Final
| | HIROYA | def. | Shota Shimada | three-round unanimous decision, 3-0 (30-29, 30-29, 30-29) | 3 | 5:00 |
| | Koya Urabe | def. | Ryuya Kusakabe | TKO (doctor stoppage) | 3 | 2:29 |
K-1 Rules, K-1 KOSHIEN Under 18 Tournament – Reserve Fight
| | Taishi Hiratsuka | def. | Daizo Sasaki | KO | 2 | 1:00 |

== See also ==
- DREAM
