= Dream 2 =

Mixed martial arts event in 2008

Dream 2: Middleweight Grand Prix 2008 1st Round
- The poster for Dream 2: Middleweight Grand Prix 2008 1st Round
- Promotion: Dream
- Date: April 29, 2008
- Venue: Saitama Super Arena
- City: Saitama, Japan
- Attendance: 21,397

Event chronology
Dream 1: Lightweight Grand Prix 2008 1st Round	Dream 2: Middleweight Grand Prix 2008 1st Round	Dream 3: Lightweight Grand Prix 2008 2nd Round

Dream 2: Middleweight Grand Prix 2008 1st Round was a mixed martial arts event promoted by Dream. It took place on Tuesday, April 29, 2008, at the Saitama Super Arena in Saitama City, Japan.

The event hosted the opening round of the promotion's Middleweight Grand Prix. All bouts were conducted under Dream Rules, (first round is 10 minutes, second round is 5 minutes) in an 84 kilograms (185 lb) weight class. The evening's Main Event featured Kazushi Sakuraba of Japan and Brazilian kyokushin karateka Andrews Nakahara. It attracted a crowd of 21,397 and was broadcast live across Japan on the SkyPerfect pay-per-view.

The Middleweight champion was determined in Dream 6.

== Results ==
Middleweight Grand Prix 1st Round
Weight class				Method	Round	Time	Notes
Middleweight	Kazushi Sakuraba	def.	Andrews Nakahara	Submission (neck crank)	1	8:20
Middleweight	Gegard Mousasi	def.	Denis Kang	Submission (triangle choke)	1	3:10
Middleweight	Kiyoshi Tamura	def.	Masakatsu Funaki	TKO (punches)	1	0:57
Middleweight	Ronaldo Souza	def.	Ian Murphy	Submission (rear-naked choke)	1	3:38
Middleweight	Zelg Galesic	def.	Magomed Sultanakhmedov	Submission (armbar)	1	1:40
Middleweight	Dong Sik Yoon	def.	Shungo Oyama	Decision (unanimous)	2	5:00
Middleweight	Taiei Kin	def.	Ikuhisa Minowa	Decision (unanimous)	2	5:00
Lightweight Grandprix 1st Round
Lightweight	Shinya Aoki	def.	Gesias Cavalcante	Decision (unanimous)	2	5:00

== 2008 Middleweight Grand Prix opening round ==
First round
(Japan)	Kazushi Sakuraba	W Sub
(Brazil)	Andrews Nakahara
(Japan)	Kiyoshi Tamura	W TKO
(Japan)	Masakatsu Funaki
(Croatia)	Zelg Galesic	W Sub
(Russia)	Magomed Sultanakhmedov
(Japan)	Taiei Kin	W Dec
(Japan)	Ikuhisa Minowa
(Armenia)	Gegard Mousasi	W Sub
(Canada)	Denis Kang
(South Korea)	Yoon Dong-Sik	W Dec
(Japan)	Shungo Oyama
(Brazil)	Ronaldo Souza	W Sub
(United States)	Ian Murphy
(United States)	Jason Miller	W TKO
(Japan)	Katsuyori Shibata

Quarterfinals
(Japan)	Kazushi Sakuraba
(Netherlands)	Melvin Manhoef**
(Croatia)	Zelg Galesic
(South Korea)	Taiei Kin
(Armenia)	Gegard Mousasi
(South Korea)	Yoon Dong-Sik
(Brazil)	Ronaldo Souza
(United States)	Jason Miller

Semifinals

Finals

Replacement = ** -->

== See also ==
- Dream (mixed martial arts)
- List of Dream champions
- 2008 in DREAM

== Notes ==
- The 8th Opening Round match was held between Katsuyori Shibata and Jason "Mayhem" Miller at Dream 3. The match between Melvin Manhoef and Ralek Gracie was rumored as the 8th match, however, only Manhoef participated in the Grand Prix reserve bout against Dae Won Kim at Dream 3.
- Originally, a bout between Frank Trigg and Ronaldo Souza was scheduled, however Trigg cited a breakdown in communication between him and Dream officials, which led to the bout being canceled.
- Andrews Nakahara and Ian Murphy made their mixed martial arts debut at this event.
- Yoshihiro Akiyama was scheduled to participate at the event, however he had to withdraw due to injuries suffered during his bout with Kazuo Misaki at Yarennoka!
- Kiyoshi Tamura dropped out of the quarter-finals citing a broken hand from his bout with Masakatsu Funaki. Many believe though the real reason was his reluctance to fight Kazushi Sakuraba, his old wrestling mentor and competitor.
