= Dream 3 =

Mixed martial arts event in 2008

Dream 3: Lightweight Grand Prix 2008 2nd Round
- The poster for Dream 3: Lightweight Grand Prix 2008 2nd Round
- Promotion: DREAM
- Date: May 11, 2008
- Venue: Saitama Super Arena
- City: Saitama, Japan
- Attendance: 21,789

Event chronology
Dream 2: Middleweight Grand Prix 2008 1st Round	Dream 3: Lightweight Grand Prix 2008 2nd Round	Dream 4: Middleweight Grand Prix 2008 2nd Round

Dream 3: Lightweight Grand Prix 2008 2nd Round was a mixed martial arts event promoted by Fighting and Entertainment Group's mixed martial arts promotion DREAM. The event took place on Tuesday May 11, 2008 at the Saitama Super Arena in Saitama, Japan and hosted the second round of the promotion's 70 kilograms (154 lb) Lightweight tournament.

The evening's main event featured Caol Uno and Mitsuhiro Ishida as well as the last fight of the first round of the Dream middleweight tournament, Katsuyori Shibata vs. Jason "Mayhem" Miller. The event was broadcast live in Japan on SkyPerfect Pay-Per-View, and live in the United States on HDNet Fights.

The Lightweight Champion was crowned at DREAM.5.

== Results ==
Lightweight Grand Prix 2nd Round
Weight class				Method	Round	Time	Notes
Lightweight	Caol Uno	def.	Mitsuhiro Ishida	Submission (rear-naked choke)	2	1:39
Lightweight	Eddie Alvarez	def.	Joachim Hansen	Decision (unanimous)	2	5:00
Lightweight	Tatsuya Kawajiri	def.	Luiz Firmino	Decision (unanimous)	2	5:00
Welterweight Championship eliminator
Welterweight	Nick Diaz	def.	Katsuya Inoue	TKO (corner stoppage)	1	6:45
Middleweight Grand Prix reserve bout
Middleweight	Melvin Manhoef	def.	Dae Won Kim	TKO (knees and punches)	1	4:08
Middleweight Grand Prix 1st Round
Middleweight	Jason Miller	def.	Katsuyori Shibata	TKO (punches)	1	6:57
Undercard
Lightweight	Daisuke Nakamura	def.	Jung Bu-kyung	KO (punch)	2	1:05
Featherweight	Takeshi Yamazaki	def.	Shoji Maruyama	Decision (unanimous)	2	5:00

== See also ==
- Dream (mixed martial arts)
- List of Dream champions
- 2008 in DREAM

== Notes ==
- The 8th matchup was initially to be postponed until DREAM.2 due to the injuries of Vítor Ribeiro and Caol Uno along with Gilbert Melendez's prior commitment to Strikeforce. Dream officials have decided to directly seed Caol Uno into the 2nd round against Mitsuhiro Ishida as the 8th fighter.
- The LW Grandprix match between Shinya Aoki and Katsuhiko Nagata took place at DREAM.4 due to the injuries Shinya Aoki incurred in his 1st round match with Gesias Calvancanti.
