= Dream 4 =

Mixed martial arts event in 2008

Dream 4: Middleweight Grand Prix 2008 2nd Round
- The poster for Dream 4: Middleweight Grand Prix 2008 2nd Round
- Promotion: DREAM
- Date: June 15, 2008
- Venue: Yokohama Arena
- City: Yokohama, Kanagawa, Japan
- Attendance: 14,037

Event chronology
Dream 3: Lightweight Grand Prix 2008 2nd Round	Dream 4: Middleweight Grand Prix 2008 2nd Round	Dream 5: Lightweight Grand Prix 2008 Final Round

Dream 4: Middleweight Grand Prix 2008 2nd Round was a mixed martial arts event held by FEG's mixed martial arts promotion DREAM. The event took place on June 15, 2008 at Yokohama Arena in Yokohama, Japan, featuring the second round of the promotion's Middleweight tournament, with winners advancing to the Dream 6: Middleweight Grand Prix 2008 Final Round at the Saitama Super Arena on September 23, 2008.

During the evening's intermission, a draw was held in the ring to determine the matchups for the July 21, 2008 Dream Lightweight GP Final in Osaka. The random selection set Eddie Alvarez against Tatsuya Kawajiri in the first semifinal; and Shinya Aoki against Caol Uno in the second.

The DREAM.4 attracted a crowd of 14,037 to the Yokohama Arena and was broadcast live in Japan on SkyPerfect TV Pay-Per-View, and in the United States on HDNet Fights.

== Results ==
Main Card
Weight class				Method	Round	Time	Notes
Featherweight	Hideo Tokoro	def.	Darren Uyenoyama	Decision (unanimous)	2	5:00
Heavyweight	Ralek Gracie	def.	Alavutdin Gadjiev	Submission (armbar)	1	3:02
Heavyweight	Alistair Overeem	def.	Tae Hyun Lee	KO (punches)	1	0:36
Middleweight Grand Prix 2008 2nd Round
Middleweight	Melvin Manhoef	def.	Kazushi Sakuraba	TKO (punches)	1	1:30
Middleweight	Ronaldo Souza	def.	Jason Miller	Decision (unanimous)	2	5:00
Middleweight	Zelg Galesic	def.	Taiei Kin	TKO (elbow injury)	1	1:05
Middleweight	Gegard Mousasi	def.	Dong Sik Yoon	Decision (unanimous)	2	5:00
Light Weight Grand Prix 2008 2nd Round
Lightweight	Shinya Aoki	def.	Katsuhiko Nagata	Submission (gogoplata)	1	5:12

== See also ==
- Dream (mixed martial arts)
- List of Dream champions
- 2008 in DREAM

== Notes ==
- Melvin Manhoef replaced Kiyoshi Tamura due to injuries Tamura incurred in his 1st round match. Manhoef had won a reserve bout against Dae Won Kim at Dream 3 to earn his spot in the 2nd round.
- Mirko "Cro Cop" Filipović was originally scheduled to compete against Ralek Gracie in a grappling match, but had to pull out due to injury.
