= Fábio Silva (fighter) =

Brazilian mixed martial arts fighter

- Born: March 31, 1982 (age 44); Brazil
- Height: 5 ft 11 in (1.80 m)
- Weight: 205 lb (93 kg; 14.6 st)
- Division: Heavyweight; Light Heavyweight; Middleweight
- Stance: Orthodox
- Fighting out of: Curitiba, Brazil
- Team: Chute Boxe
- Years active: 2003–present

Mixed martial arts record
- Total: 24
- Wins: 15
- By knockout: 11
- By submission: 1
- By decision: 3
- Losses: 9
- By knockout: 2
- By submission: 1
- By decision: 5
- By disqualification: 1

Other information
- Mixed martial arts record from Sherdog

Fábio Silva (born March 31, 1982) is a Brazilian mixed martial artist currently competing in the light heavyweight division.

== Mixed martial arts career ==
=== Early career ===
Turning professional is 2003, Silva amassed a record of 10 wins and 3 losses.

=== Hero's ===
Silva faced explosive striker Melvin Manhoef at Hero's 10 on September 17, 2007. Silva lost the fight via TKO at exactly 1 minute into the first round.

He then faced Yoon Dong-sik at Hero's 2007 in Korea on October 28, 2007. He lost the fight via armbar submission in the first round.

=== World Victory Road ===
Silva faced Kazuo Takahashi at World Victory Road Presents: Sengoku 3 on June 8, 2008. Silva won the fight via knockout due to a knee at 0:24 in the second round.

He then faced future Strikeforce light heavyweight champion Muhammed Lawal at World Victory Road Presents: Sengoku 6. He lost the fight via TKO due to punches in the third round.

Silva faced Ryo Kawamura at World Victory Road Presents: Sengoku 10 on September 23, 2009. He won the fight via TKO due to a corner stoppage at 2:28 in the first round.

=== Post-Sengoku ===
After a long hiatus, Silva returned and defeated Renan Fett via TKO in the second round to claim the Predador FC light heavyweight championship before losing to UFC veteran Luiz Cané via unanimous decision at Standout Fighting Tournament 2.

== Championships and accomplishments ==
- Predador Fight Championship
  - Predador FC light heavyweight championship (one time, current)

== Mixed martial arts record ==
Professional record breakdown
24 matches	15 wins	9 losses
By knockout	11	2
By submission	1	1
By decision	3	5
By disqualification	0	1
Draws	0	

Res.	Record	Opponent	Method	Event	Date	Round	Time	Location	Notes
Win	15–9	Defu Monteiro	TKO (punches)	Nacao Cyborg 9	July 29, 2021	2	3:12	Parana, Brazil	Heavyweight bout.
Win	14–9	Julio Juarez	TKO (punches)	Nacao Cyborg 1	April 7, 2018	1	3:02	Parana, Brazil	
Loss	13–9	Carlos Eduardo	Decision (split)	ACB 73: Silva vs. Makoev	October 21, 2017	3	5:00	Rio de Janeiro, Brazil	
Loss	13–8	Marcelo Alejandro Nuñez Sparling	DQ (Illegal Strikes)	Striker's House Cup 55	October 17, 2015	2	1:32	Curitiba, Brazil	
Loss	13–7	Luiz Cané	Decision (unanimous)	Standout Fighting Tournament 2	November 29, 2013	3	5:00	São Paulo, Brazil	
Win	13–6	Renan Fett	TKO (elbow and punches)	Predador FC 24	August 9, 2013	2	3:58	São Paulo, Brazil	Won the Predador FC Light Heavyweight Championship.
Win	12–6	Ryo Kawamura	TKO (corner stoppage)	World Victory Road Presents: Sengoku 10	September 23, 2009	1	2:28	Saitama, Japan	
Loss	11–6	Muhammed Lawal	TKO (punches)	World Victory Road Presents: Sengoku 6	November 1, 2008	3	0:41	Saitama, Japan	
Win	11–5	Kazuo Takahashi	KO (knee)	World Victory Road Presents: Sengoku 3	June 8, 2008	2	0:24	Saitama, Japan	Return to Light Heavyweight.
Loss	10–5	Yoon Dong-sik	Submission (armbar)	Hero's 2007 in Korea	October 28, 2007	1	6:12	Seoul, South Korea	
Loss	10–4	Melvin Manhoef	TKO (punches)	Hero's 10	September 17, 2007	1	1:00	Yokohama, Japan	Middleweight debut.
Win	10–3	Claudio Cunha Godoy	KO (knees)	Predador FC 6: Octagon	August 25, 2007	2	0:08	São Paulo, Brazil	
Win	9–3	Ryo Kawamura	KO (punches)	Pancrase: Rising 5	May 30, 2007	2	3:44	Tokyo, Japan	
Win	8–3	Geno Vitale-Sansoti	Decision (unanimous)	Predador FC 5: Kamae	April 21, 2007	3	5:00	São Paulo, Brazil	
Loss	7–3	Leandro Gordo	Decision (unanimous)	Tsunamy 4	October 7, 2006	3	5:00	Pelotas, Brazil	
Win	7–2	Jorge Luis Bezerra	Decision (unanimous)	Storm Samurai 11	May 21, 2006	3	5:00	Curitiba, Brazil	
Win	6–2	Rafael Tatu	Decision (unanimous)	Meca 12: Meca World Vale Tudo 12	July 9, 2005	3	5:00	Rio de Janeiro, Brazil	
Win	5–2	Avallone Filho	TKO (soccer kicks)	Storm Samurai 7	June 11, 2005	1	3:52	Curitiba, Brazil	
Win	4–2	Divino Lopes	Submission (guillotine choke)	Shooto Brazil: New Generation	November 28, 2004	1	3:32	Curitiba, Brazil	
Win	3–2	Yuguem Toma	KO (knee)	Storm Samurai 4	August 7, 2004	1	N/A	Brazil	
Loss	2–2	Antonio Canudo	Decision (unanimous)	Real Fight 1	July 30, 2004	3	5:00	Rio de Janeiro, Brazil	
Loss	2–1	Jefferson Gaucho	Decision (split)	CO: Muay Thai & Vale Tudo	May 2, 2004	3	5:00	Curitiba, Brazil	
Win	2–0	Emerson Graxaim	KO	Storm Samurai 3	April 18, 2004	2	0:45	Curitiba, Brazil	
Win	1–0	Jefferson Gaucho	TKO (doctor stoppage)	Challenge Original Brazilian Vale Tudo 2	December 20, 2003	1	5:00	Curitiba, Brazil	
