= Ikuhisa Minowa =

Japanese professional wrestler and mixed martial arts fighter (born 1976)

Ikuhisa Minowa ミノワマン
- Born: January 12, 1976 (age 50); Hashima, Gifu, Japan
- Other names: Minowaman Z
- Nationality: Japanese
- Height: 5 ft 9 in (1.75 m)
- Weight: 198 lb (90 kg; 14 st 2 lb)
- Division: Heavyweight; Light Heavyweight; Middleweight; Welterweight
- Reach: 70 1/2 in (179 cm)
- Stance: Orthodox
- Fighting out of: Tokyo, Japan
- Team: Pancraseism; Brazilian Top Team; Team Minowaman
- Teachers: Masakatsu Funaki; Minoru Suzuki
- Rank: 2nd Dan Black Belt in Judo
- Years active: 1996–present

Mixed martial arts record
- Total: 117
- Wins: 64
- By knockout: 12
- By submission: 42
- By decision: 10
- Losses: 45
- By knockout: 17
- By submission: 7
- By decision: 21
- Draws: 8

Other information
- Mixed martial arts record from Sherdog

Ikuhisa Minowa (美濃輪 育久, Minowa Ikuhisa; born January 12, 1976) is a Japanese mixed martial artist and professional wrestler currently competing in IGF as Minowaman (ミノワマン, Minowaman). A professional MMA competitor since 1996, he was a longtime veteran of PRIDE and Pancrase and has also competed in other mixed martial arts promotions such as K-1 Hero's, Cage Rage, the SFL, Vale Tudo Japan, UFC, DREAM, and DEEP. He is the former DREAM Openweight Grand Prix Champion (Super Hulk). Often undersized and a huge fan favorite in Japan, Minowa earned his nickname "The Giant Killer" by participating in many openweight contests, often submitting much larger opponents. Also renowned for his durability, he is a veteran of 117 fights, and is known for his trademark red speedo and mullet.

== Mixed martial arts career ==
=== Early career ===
Minowa made his professional debut in the Lumax Cup in 1996, but would spend most of his early career in the Pancrase promotion. Minowa had a poor start to his MMA career, going 1–8–1 in his first ten fights, taking on MMA pioneers such as Yuki Kondo and Jason DeLucia, and with the win being in his Pancrase debut. The young Minowa would turn his career around, however, improving to 12–11–6 with a win over Daiju Takase before fighting in his first and only fight in the UFC at UFC 25 in Tokyo, Japan. The bout was against Joe Slick and Minowa won via TKO from a cut that Slick received.

Minowa continued to fight in Pancrase as well as another Japanese organization, DEEP, before leaving the Pancraseism team in April 2003.

=== PRIDE ===
Minowa made his PRIDE Fighting Championships debut against future UFC Light Heavyweight Champion Quinton "Rampage" Jackson. Around this time, he would briefly join the Brazilian Top Team, becoming its first Japanese member and the only who didn't come from a Brazilian jiu-jitsu background.

Minowa was known in PRIDE for his entertaining entrances and sporting of the Japanese flag as a cape as well as his aggressive, high-risk style of fighting which has seen him employ flying dropkicks amongst other pro-wrestling derived maneuvers. It was also during his career with PRIDE that he continued to cement his legacy in taking on fighters that were much bigger than himself, winning most of the resultant freak show fights and earning the nickname "The Giant Killer".

He participated in PRIDE's first 185 lb tournament where he won over Phil Baroni, but went on to lose in the second round to former UFC Middleweight Champion Murilo Bustamante. On December 31, 2005, Minowa fought the legendary Kazushi Sakuraba, in which he almost landed a kneebar and then a heel hook, but was caught with a Kimura lock and defeated at nine minutes into the first round. Minowa next fought at PRIDE Bushido 10, where he faced the 7-foot-2 Giant Silva. Minowa dominated the fight, using a forward roll to get past Silva's enormous reach and then landing a single leg takedown that put Silva on his back. Minowa promptly landed multiple knees to the head of Silva, causing the referee to stop the fight at 2:23 of the first round. Following that, he fell to Mirko Cro Cop due to strikes in the first round. However, he then rebounded with wins over Park Hyun Kab, Eric "Butterbean" Esch, and American professional wrestler Mike Plotcheck.

Minowa was knocked out in his last fight for PRIDE by Kiyoshi Tamura at PRIDE Shockwave 2006, but celebrated 10 years as a fighter at the CMA Festival 2 event by defeating Min-Seok Heo in the main event after his opponent's corner threw in the towel after the first round. His next opponent was South Korean wrestler Choi Seung Hyun at Heat4: Mega Battle Heat from Nagoya. Minowa won the bout via shoulder lock.

=== HERO'S ===
Minowa later competed for K-1's HERO'S promotion. His biggest match there was another of his classical openweight affairs against Zuluzinho, who outweighed Minowa by 102 kg/225Ibs. The Japanese performed well, circling the less mobile Brazilian and at one point throwing him with seoi nage, but Zulu eventually caught and smothered him, finishing him with ground and pound.

=== DREAM ===
He fought MMA legend and former mentor Masakatsu Funaki at the DREAM 6 event on September 22, 2008. He was submitted in the first round via heel hook.

At DREAM 8 he lost via decision to professional wrestler Katsuyori Shibata, after being suplexed by the young Japanese fighter, but rebounded at Dream 9 defeating Bob Sapp in what was his 80th fight.

He faced the 7'2" 319 lb Choi Hong-man at DREAM 11 on October 6, 2009. Throughout the fight he attempted to take his opponent down, being successful on two occasions in the first round, before submitting his opponent in the second.

At Dynamite!! 2009 Minowa squared off with Cameroonian fighter Rameau Thierry Sokoudjou in the finals of the DREAM Super Hulk tournament. In the first round Sokoudjou landed many strikes on the smaller fighter while Minowa attempted leglocks. At the end of the second round Minowa had Sokoudjou in a kneebar but was cut off by the bell before he could adjust his grip. In the third round Minowa and Sokodjou both received two yellow cards (10% purse deduction for one) for inactivity 3 minutes into the round, but with 90 seconds left Minowa sprang forward and connected against Sokoudjou's jaw with a left hook, dropping him to the ground for the TKO victory and winning the Super Hulk Tournament.

Minowa went on to fight American Super Heavyweights Jimmy Ambriz and Imani Lee at DREAM 13 and DREAM 14 respectively, winning both fights by submission.

Then for DREAM 16, Minowa was scheduled to fight James Thompson but three days before the event, had his opponent switched to Satoshi Ishii and he lost by unanimous decision.

=== Independent promotions ===
Minowa next faced Chang Hee Kim of South Korea at DEEP: 50th Impact on October 24, 2010. Minowa gave up a significant weight advantage to Kim, who weighs over 300 pounds. He won the fight via submission in the first round.

Minowa faced Kendall Grove at ProElite 3 on January 21, 2012. He lost the fight by unanimous decision.

Minowa faced debuting MMA fighter Goran Jettingstad at IGF 1 on April 5, 2014. He won by submission (lateral kneebar).

Minowa then faced Jung-Gyo Park at ROAD FC 15 on May 31, 2014. Minowa lost the bout via KO late in the first round.

Minowa faced Shinichi Suzukawa at IGF: Inoki Genome Fight 2 on August 23, 2014. He lost the fight via corner stoppage TKO in the second round.

=== Rizin ===
Minowa faced former sumo wrestler Sudario Tsuyoshi at Rizin 26 on December 31, 2020. He lost the fight via first-round technical knockout.

Minowa faced Kiyoshi Kuwabara at Rizin Landmark 4 on November 6, 2022. He lost the fight via ground and pound TKO stoppage in the first round.

== Professional wrestling career ==
In 2010, Minowa turned his attention to professional wrestling. On 22 February 2010, Minowaman made his debut for Antonio Inoki's IGF facing and defeating Necro Butcher in a 10-minute match.

Minowa has also undertook some additional professional wrestling training under the tutelage of Satoru Sayama, the original Tiger Mask. On July 18, 2010, Minowa debuted as the fifth generation Tiger Mask.

On September 5, 2019 it was announced that Minowa would face Timothy Thatcher on Saturday September 14, 2019 as part of Josh Barnett's GCW Bloodsport 2 event. He lost the match in 9 minutes and 34 seconds.

== Education ==
Minowa attended the Toyama College of Health and Science.

== Championships and accomplishments ==
- DREAM
  - 2009 DREAM Super Hulk Grand Prix Champion
- Pancrase Hybrid Wrestling
  - 1999 Neo Blood Tournament Winner
  - 2000 King of Pancrase Light Heavyweight Championship Tournament Runner-Up
  - 1997 Neo Blood Tournament Semifinalist
- PRIDE Fighting Championships
  - 2005 PRIDE Welterweight Grand Prix Semifinalist
- Ultimate Fighting Championship
  - UFC Encyclopedia Awards
    - Knockout of the Night (One time) vs. Joe Slick

== Mixed martial arts record ==
Professional record breakdown
117 matches	64 wins	45 losses
By knockout	12	17
By submission	42	7
By decision	10	21
Draws	8	

Res.	Record	Opponent	Method	Event	Date	Round	Time	Location	Notes
Loss	64–45–8	Kiyoshi Kuwabara	TKO (punches)	Rizin Landmark 4	November 6, 2022	1	2:24	Nagoya, Japan	
Loss	64–44–8	Tsuyoshi Sudario	TKO (leg kick and punch)	Rizin 26: Saitama	December 31, 2020	1	3:17	Saitama, Japan	
Loss	64–43–8	Eiji Ishikawa	Decision (unanimous)	Pancrase 306	June 30, 2019	3	5:00	Tokyo, Japan	
Win	64–42–8	Dong Sik Yoon	TKO (finger injury)	ROAD FC 42	September 23, 2017	2	2:26	South Korea	
Loss	63–42–8	Yuki Kondo	Decision (unanimous)	Pancrase 288	July 2, 2017	3	3:00	Tokyo, Japan	
Win	63–41–8	Tetsuo Onuma	KO (punches)	CMA MMA - Crazy King 8 / CMA Kaiser 4	April 8, 2017	2	1:31	Tokyo, Japan	
Loss	62–41–8	Yuya Shirai	Decision (unanimous)	DEEP: 75 Impact	February 27, 2016	3	5:00	Tokyo, Japan	Welterweight bout.
Loss	62–40–8	Zilong Zhao	TKO (punches)	ROAD FC 27 in China	December 26, 2015	1	1:24	Shanghai, China	Light Heavyweight bout.
Win	62–39–8	Tetsuo Kondo	Submission (rear-naked choke)	ACF 14	October 24, 2015	1	2:48	Osaka, Japan	
Loss	61–39–8	Justin Morton	Decision (unanimous)	VTJ in Okinawa	October 3, 2015	3	5:00	Okinawa, Japan	95 kg bout.
Win	61–38–8	Dae Sung Kim	Decision (unanimous)	Road FC 24	July 25, 2015	3	5:00	Koto, Tokyo, Japan	Middleweight bout.
Loss	60–38–8	Oli Thompson	Decision (unanimous)	Inoki Genome Fight 3	April 11, 2015	2	5:00	Tokyo, Japan	IGF World Grand Prix Quarterfinal.
Win	60–37–8	Yuichiro Ono	TKO (doctor stoppage)	Gladiator 81	February 28, 2015	2	N/A	Tokyo, Japan	Openweight bout.
Loss	59–37–8	Shinichi Suzukawa	TKO (corner stoppage)	IGF: Inoki Genome Fight 2	August 23, 2014	2	0:59	Tokyo, Japan	Openweight bout.
Loss	59–36–8	Jung-Gyo Park	KO (punch)	ROAD FC 15	May 31, 2014	1	4:42	Wonju, South Korea	
Win	59–35–8	Goran Jettingstad	Submission (achilles lock)	Inoki Genome Fight 1	April 5, 2014	1	2:26	Tokyo, Japan	Middleweight bout.
Win	58–35–8	Atsushi Sawada	TKO (punch and soccer kick)	IGF: Inoki-Bom-Ba-Ye 2013	December 31, 2013	1	3:47	Tokyo, Japan	Openweight bout.
Win	57–35–8	Hoon Kim	KO (punch)	Road FC 13	October 12, 2013	1	3:37	Seoul, South Korea	Welterweight debut.
Loss	56–35–8	Hae Suk Son	TKO (punches)	Road FC 11	April 13, 2013	3	0:54	Seoul, South Korea	
Win	56–34–8	Bor Bratovž	Submission (heel hook)	IGF: Inoki-Bom-Ba-Ye 2012	December 31, 2012	1	3:20	Ryogoku Kokugikan, Japan	Middleweight bout.
Win	55–34–8	Jin Soo Yuk	Submission (kimura)	Road FC 9	September 15, 2012	1	4:59	Wonju Chiak Indoor Gym, South Korea	Openweight bout.
Loss	54–34–8	Alexander Shlemenko	TKO (knee and punch to the body)	SFL 2	April 7, 2012	1	2:20	Chandigarh, India	
Win	54–33–8	Shigeki Tsuchiya	Submission (kimura)	Gladiator 30	March 11, 2012	1	1:16	Fukuoka, Japan	
Win	53–33–8	Toshihiro Koyama	Submission (arm-triangle choke)	Gladiator 29	February 19, 2012	1	1:49	Kariya, Aichi, Japan	
Loss	52–33–8	Kendall Grove	Decision (unanimous)	ProElite 3	January 21, 2012	3	5:00	Honolulu, Hawaii, United States	Middleweight bout.
Win	52–32–8	Dev Kumar Ghimire	Submission (armbar)	Gladiator 27	December 18, 2011	1	1:20	Tokyo, Japan	
Win	51–32–8	Young Woo Yu	Submission (kimura)	Gladiator 25	October 30, 2011	1	2:55	Tokyo, Japan	
Win	50–32–8	Baru Harn	Submission (scarf hold armlock)	DREAM 17	September 24, 2011	1	4:39	Saitama, Japan	Heavyweight bout.
Win	49–32–8	Jair Gomes	Submission (neck crank)	Gladiator 22	August 14, 2011	1	N/A	Gifu, Japan	
Win	48–32–8	Carlos Toyota	Decision (unanimous)	Heat 18	June 5, 2011	3	5:00	Osaka, Japan	
Loss	47–32–8	Hiroshi Izumi	TKO (punches)	Dynamite!! 2010	December 31, 2010	3	2:50	Saitama, Japan	Light Heavyweight bout.
Win	47–31–8	Chang Hee Kim	Submission (scarf hold armlock)	DEEP: 50 Impact	October 24, 2010	1	2:07	Tokyo, Japan	Openweight bout.
Loss	46–31–8	Satoshi Ishii	Decision (unanimous)	DREAM 16	September 25, 2010	2	5:00	Nagoya, Japan	Heavyweight bout.
Win	46–30–8	Imani Lee	Submission (rear-naked choke)	DREAM 14	May 29, 2010	1	4:16	Saitama, Saitama, Japan	Super Heavyweight bout.
Win	45–30–8	Jimmy Ambriz	Submission (toe hold)	DREAM 13	Mar 22, 2010	2	2:42	Yokohama, Japan	Heavyweight bout.
Win	44–30–8	Rameau Thierry Sokoudjou	TKO (punches)	Dynamite!! The Power of Courage 2009	Dec 31, 2009	3	3:29	Saitama, Japan	Won the DREAM Super Hulk Grand Prix Tournament.
Win	43–30–8	Choi Hong-man	Submission (heel hook)	DREAM 11	Oct 6, 2009	2	1:27	Yokohama, Japan	DREAM Super Hulk Grand Prix Semifinal.
Win	42–30–8	Bob Sapp	Submission (achilles lock)	DREAM 9	May 26, 2009	1	1:15	Yokohama, Japan	DREAM Super Hulk Grand Prix Quarterfinal.
Loss	41–30–8	Katsuyori Shibata	Decision (unanimous)	DREAM 8	April 5, 2009	2	5:00	Nagoya, Japan	88 kg Catchweight bout.
Win	41–29–8	Errol Zimmerman	Submission (toe hold)	Fields Dynamite!! 2008	December 31, 2008	1	1:01	Saitama, Japan	Heavyweight bout.
Loss	40–29–8	Masakatsu Funaki	Submission (heel hook)	DREAM 6: Middleweight Grand Prix 2008 Final Round	September 23, 2008	1	0:52	Saitama, Japan	Light Heavyweight bout.
Win	40–28–8	Don Frye	Submission (kneebar)	DEEP: Gladiator	August 16, 2008	1	3:56	Okayama, Japan	
Loss	39–28–8	Taiei Kin	Decision (unanimous)	DREAM 2: Middleweight Grand Prix 2008 First Round	April 29, 2008	2	5:00	Saitama, Japan	Return to Middleweight.
Win	39–27–8	Kwan Bum Lee	Submission (kneebar)	DREAM 1: Lightweight Grand Prix 2008 First Round	March 15, 2008	1	1:25	Saitama, Japan	Heavyweight bout.
Loss	38–27–8	Zuluzinho	TKO (corner stoppage)	K-1 Premium 2007 Dynamite!!	December 31, 2007	3	2:13	Saitama, Japan	
Loss	38–26–8	Kim Min-Soo	TKO (punches)	HERO'S 2007 in Korea	October 28, 2007	1	3:46	Seoul, South Korea	Openweight bout.
Win	38–25–8	Kevin Casey	TKO (punches)	HERO'S 10	September 17, 2007	2	0:42	Yokohama, Japan	
Win	37–25–8	Seung Hyun Choi	Submission (reverse kimura)	Heat 4	August 11, 2007	1	1:41	Nagoya, Japan	
Win	36–25–8	Min Suk Heo	TKO (corner stoppage)	DEEP: CMA Festival 2	July 23, 2007	1	5:00	Tokyo, Japan	
Loss	35–25–8	Kiyoshi Tamura	KO (soccer kicks)	PRIDE FC: Shockwave 2006	December 31, 2006	1	1:18	Saitama, Japan	Return to Welterweight.
Win	35–24–8	Mike Polchlopek	Decision (unanimous)	PRIDE: Bushido 13	November 5, 2006	2	5:00	Yokohama, Japan	Heavyweight bout.
Win	34–24–8	Butterbean	Submission (armbar)	PRIDE: Bushido 12	August 26, 2006	1	4:25	Nagoya, Japan	Super Heavyweight bout.
Win	33–24–8	Hyun Gab Park	Submission (achilles lock)	DEEP: CMA Festival	May 24, 2006	1	0:17	Tokyo, Japan	
Loss	32–24–8	Mirko Cro Cop	TKO (punches)	PRIDE FC: Total Elimination Absolute	May 5, 2006	1	1:10	Osaka, Japan	2006 PRIDE Open Weight Grand Prix Quarterfinal.
Win	32–23–8	Giant Silva	TKO (knees)	PRIDE: Bushido 10	April 2, 2006	1	2:23	Tokyo, Japan	Super Heavyweight bout.
Win	31–23–8	Dave Legeno	Submission (achilles lock)	Cage Rage 15	February 4, 2006	1	2:21	London, England	
Loss	30–23–8	Kazushi Sakuraba	Technical Submission (kimura)	PRIDE Shockwave 2005	December 31, 2005	1	9:59	Saitama, Japan	
Loss	30–22–8	Murilo Bustamante	TKO (soccer kicks)	PRIDE Bushido 9	September 25, 2005	1	9:51	Tokyo, Japan	2005 PRIDE Welterweight Grand Prix Semifinal.
Win	30–21–8	Phil Baroni	Decision (unanimous)	PRIDE Bushido 9	September 25, 2005	2	5:00	Tokyo, Japan	2005 PRIDE Welterweight Grand Prix Quarterfinal.
Win	29–21–8	Kimo Leopoldo	Submission (achilles lock)	PRIDE Bushido 8	July 17, 2005	1	3:11	Nagoya, Japan	Heavyweight bout.
Loss	28–21–8	Phil Baroni	TKO (stomps)	PRIDE Bushido 7	May 22, 2005	2	2:04	Tokyo, Japan	
Win	28–20–8	Gilbert Yvel	Submission (toe hold)	PRIDE Bushido 6	April 3, 2005	1	1:10	Yokohama, Japan	Heavyweight bout.
Win	27–20–8	Stefan Leko	Submission (heel hook)	PRIDE Shockwave 2004	December 31, 2004	1	0:27	Saitama, Japan	Return to Middleweight.
Win	26–20–8	Ryuki Ueyama	Decision (split)	PRIDE Bushido 5	October 14, 2004	2	5:00	Osaka, Japan	
Win	25–20–8	Kenichi Yamamoto	TKO (punches)	PRIDE Bushido 4	June 19, 2004	1	3:23	Nagoya, Japan	
Win	24–20–8	Eduard Churakov	Submission (rear-naked choke)	Gladiator FC: Day 1	June 26, 2004	1	2:29	South Korea	
Loss	23–20–8	Ryan Gracie	Decision (split)	PRIDE Bushido 3	May 23, 2004	2	5:00	Yokohama, Japan	
Loss	23–19–8	Wanderlei Silva	KO (punches)	PRIDE Bushido 2	February 15, 2004	1	1:09	Yokohama, Japan	
Loss	23–18–8	Quinton Jackson	TKO (knee)	PRIDE Shockwave 2003	December 31, 2003	2	1:05	Saitama, Japan	
Win	23–17–8	Silmar Rodrigo	Submission (rolling kneebar)	Brazil Super Fight	September 19, 2003	2	3:00	Porto Alegre, Brazil	
Loss	22–17–8	Ricardo Almeida	Decision (unanimous)	Pancrase: Hybrid 2	February 16, 2003	3	5:00	Osaka, Japan	
Win	22–16–8	Yuki Sasaki	Decision (majority)	Pancrase: Spirit 8	November 30, 2002	3	5:00	Yokohama, Japan	
Loss	21–16–8	Kiyoshi Tamura	Decision (unanimous)	DEEP: 6th Impact	September 7, 2002	3	5:00	Tokyo, Japan	Openweight bout.
Loss	21–15–8	Mitsuyoshi Sato	Decision (majority)	Pancrase: Spirit 5	May 28, 2002	3	5:00	Tokyo, Japan	
Draw	21–14–8	Yoshinori Momose	Draw (majority)	Pancrase: Spirit 3	March 25, 2002	2	5:00	Tokyo, Japan	
Win	21–14–7	Kazuki Okubo	Submission (armbar)	DEEP: 3rd Impact	December 23, 2001	1	3:38	Tokyo, Japan	
Win	20–14–7	Hiroshi Shibata	TKO (doctor stoppage)	Pancrase: Proof 7	December 1, 2001	1	2:28	Yokohama, Japan	
Loss	19–14–7	Sanae Kikuta	TKO (doctor stoppage)	Pancrase: 2001 Anniversary Show	September 30, 2001	2	4:30	Yokohama, Japan	For the vacant Pancrase Light Heavyweight Championship.
Win	19–13–7	Kenji Akiyama	Submission (guillotine choke)	Pancrase: 2001 Neo-Blood Tournament Opening Round	July 29, 2001	3	2:52	Tokyo, Japan	
Win	18–13–7	Yuki Sasaki	Submission (toe hold)	Pancrase: Proof 3	May 13, 2001	3	0:25	Tokyo, Japan	
Loss	17–13–7	Paulo Filho	Decision (unanimous)	Pancrase: Proof 2	March 31, 2001	3	5:00	Osaka, Japan	
Draw	17–12–7	Ricardo Liborio	Draw (time limit)	DEEP: 1st Impact	January 8, 2001	3	5:00	Nagoya, Japan	
Win	17–12–6	Magomed Ismailov	Submission (armbar)	Pancrase: Trans 7	December 4, 2000	1	1:31	Tokyo, Japan	
Loss	16–12–6	Keiichiro Yamamiya	Decision (unanimous)	Pancrase: 2000 Anniversary Show	September 24, 2000	2	3:00	Yokohama, Japan	2000 King of Pancrase Light Heavyweight Championship Tournament Final. For the inaugural Pancrase Light Heavyweight Championship.
Win	16–11–6	Brian Gassaway	Submission (toe hold)	Pancrase: 2000 Anniversary Show	September 24, 2000	1	5:00	Yokohama, Japan	2000 King of Pancrase Light Heavyweight Championship Tournament Semifinal.
Win	15–11–6	Tony Ross	Submission (armbar)	Pancrase: Trans 5	July 23, 2000	1	1:32	Tokyo, Japan	2000 King of Pancrase Light Heavyweight Championship Tournament Quarterfinal.
Win	14–11–6	Masaya Kojima	Submission (toe hold)	Pancrase: Trans 5	July 23, 2000	1	1:43	Tokyo, Japan	2000 King of Pancrase Light Heavyweight Championship Tournament Opening Round.
Win	13–11–6	Joe Slick	TKO (cut)	UFC 25	April 14, 2000	3	2:02	Tokyo, Japan	
Win	12–11–6	Ichio Matsubara	Submission (rear-naked choke)	Pancrase: Trans 2	February 27, 2000	1	1:21	Osaka, Japan	
Draw	11–11–6	Chris Lytle	Draw (time limit)	Pancrase: Breakthrough 11	December 18, 1999	1	15:00	Yokohama, Japan	
Win	11–11–5	Adrian Serrano	Submission (heel hook)	Pancrase: Breakthrough 9	October 25, 1999	1	11:38	Tokyo, Japan	
Loss	10–11–5	Semmy Schilt	Decision (unanimous)	Pancrase: 1999 Anniversary Show	September 18, 1999	1	10:00	Chiba, Japan	
Win	10–10–5	Minoru Toyonaga	Submission (rear-naked choke)	Pancrase: 1999 Neo-Blood Tournament Second Round	August 1, 1999	1	2:57	Tokyo, Japan	Won the 1999 Neo Blood Tournament.
Win	9–10–5	Daisuke Watanabe	Submission (triangle choke)	Pancrase: 1999 Neo-Blood Tournament Second Round	August 1, 1999	1	4:28	Tokyo, Japan	1999 Neo Blood Tournament Semifinal.
Win	8–10–5	Daiju Takase	Submission (triangle choke)	Pancrase: 1999 Neo-Blood Tournament Second Round	August 1, 1999	1	7:59	Tokyo, Japan	1999 Neo Blood Tournament Quarterfinal.
Loss	7–10–5	Jason DeLucia	Decision (unanimous)	Pancrase: Breakthrough 6	June 11, 1999	1	10:00	Tokyo, Japan	
Draw	7–9–5	Osami Shibuya	Draw (unanimous)	Pancrase: Breakthrough 5	May 23, 1999	2	3:00	Nagoya, Japan	
Draw	7–9–4	Susumu Yamasaki	Draw	Daidojuku: Wars 5	April 8, 1999	1	15:00	Japan	
Win	7–9–3	Kosei Kubota	Decision (unanimous)	Pancrase: Breakthrough 3	March 9, 1999	1	10:00	Tokyo, Japan	
Win	6–9–3	Daisuke Ishii	Decision (majority)	Pancrase: Breakthrough 2	February 11, 1999	1	10:00	Osaka, Japan	
Win	5–9–3	Daisuke Watanabe	Submission (armbar)	Pancrase: Breakthrough 1	January 19, 1999	1	3:18	Tokyo, Japan	
Win	4–9–3	Satoshi Hasegawa	Submission (armbar)	Pancrase: Advance 11	November 29, 1998	1	2:43	Osaka, Japan	
Win	3–9–3	Daisuke Ishii	Decision (unanimous)	Pancrase: Advance 10	October 26, 1998	1	10:00	Tokyo, Japan	
Draw	2–9–3	Travis Fulton	Draw (unanimous)	Pancrase: Advance 9	October 4, 1998	2	3:00	Tokyo, Japan	
Loss	2–9–2	Evan Tanner	Submission (arm-triangle choke)	Pancrase: 1998 Neo-Blood Tournament Opening Round	July 7, 1998	1	4:05	Tokyo, Japan	
Draw	2–8–2	Kosei Kubota	Draw (split)	Pancrase: Advance 8	June 21, 1998	2	3:00	Kobe, Japan	
Win	2–8–1	Adrian Serrano	Decision (lost points)	Pancrase: Advance 7	June 2, 1998	1	10:00	Tokyo, Japan	
Loss	1–8–1	Satoshi Hasegawa	Decision (majority)	Pancrase: Advance 5	April 26, 1998	2	3:00	Yokohama, Japan	
Loss	1–7–1	Satoshi Hasegawa	Submission (toe hold)	Pancrase: Advance 1	January 16, 1998	2	1:10	Tokyo, Japan	
Loss	1–6–1	Jason DeLucia	Submission (rear-naked choke)	Pancrase: Alive 11	December 20, 1997	1	3:47	Yokohama, Japan	
Loss	1–5–1	Osami Shibuya	Decision (lost points)	Pancrase: Alive 10	November 16, 1997	1	10:00	Kobe, Japan	
Loss	1–4–1	Takafumi Ito	Submission (toe hold)	Pancrase: Alive 9	October 29, 1997	1	6:34	Tokyo, Japan	
Draw	1–3–1	Kosei Kubota	Draw (majority)	Pancrase: 1997 Anniversary Show	September 6, 1997	1	10:00	Chiba, Japan	
Loss	1–3	Yuki Kondo	Submission (toe hold)	Pancrase: Alive 8	August 9, 1997	1	5:13	Osaka, Japan	
Loss	1–2	Satoshi Hasegawa	Decision (unanimous)	Pancrase: 1997 Neo-Blood Tournament, Round 2	July 21, 1997	2	3:00	Tokyo, Japan	1997 Neo Blood Tournament Semifinal.
Win	1–1	Haygar Chin	Submission (kneebar)	Pancrase: 1997 Neo-Blood Tournament, Round 1	July 20, 1997	1	2:24	Tokyo, Japan	1997 Neo Blood Tournament Quarterfinal.
Loss	0–1	Yuzo Tateishi	Decision	Lumax Cup: Tournament of J '96	March 30, 1996	2	3:00	Japan	

== Submission grappling record ==
Result	Opponent	Method	Event	Date	Round	Time	Notes
Win	(Japan) Hideo Tokoro	Submission (ankle hold)	Quintet Fight Night 4	November 30, 2019	1	N/A	
Loss	(Japan) Shutaro Debana	Submission (flying armbar)	Quintet Fight Night 2	February 3, 2019	1	0:12	
Loss	(United States) AJ Agazarm	Submission (triangle choke)	Polaris 4	October 29, 2016	1	5:11	

== See also ==
- List of professional wrestlers by MMA record
