= Dream 1 =

Mixed martial arts event in 2008

Dream 1: Lightweight Grand Prix 2008 1st Round
- The poster for Dream 1: Lightweight Grand Prix 2008 1st Round
- Promotion: Dream
- Date: March 15, 2008
- Venue: Saitama Super Arena
- City: Saitama, Japan
- Attendance: 19,120

Event chronology
| Dream 1: Lightweight Grand Prix 2008 1st Round | Dream 2: Middleweight Grand Prix 2008 1st Round |

Dream 1: Lightweight Grand Prix 2008 1st Round was the inaugural event of the mixed martial arts promotion, Dream. It took place on Saturday, on March 15, 2008 at the Saitama Super Arena in Saitama City, Japan.

The event featured the first seven tournament bouts of the 2008 Dream Lightweight Grand Prix, fought at 70 kilograms (154 lb), along with a trio of open-weight fights. The evening's main event was a match featuring last year's Hero's Middleweight Champion, J.Z. Calvancanti of Brazil and Japanese judoka Shinya Aoki. All bouts were fought under Dream mixed martial arts rules, with a 10 min first and 5 min second round. It attracted a sellout crowd of 19,120 and was broadcast live across Japan on the TBS television network.

== Results ==
Main Card
| Weight class | | | | Method | Round | Time | Notes |
|---|---|---|---|---|---|---|---|
| Heavyweight | Mirko Cro Cop | def. | Tatsuya Mizuno | TKO (punches) | 1 | 0:56 |
| Welterweight | Hayato Sakurai | def. | Hidetaka Monma | TKO (punches) | 1 | 4:12 |
| Heavyweight | Ikuhisa Minowa | def. | Kwan Bum Lee | Submission (kneebar) | 1 | 1:25 |
Lightweight Grandprix 1st Round
| Lightweight | Gesias Cavalcante | vs. | Shinya Aoki | NC (Aoki injured by illegal elbows) | 1 | 3:46 |
| Lightweight | Tatsuya Kawajiri | def. | Kultar Gill | Decision (unanimous) | 2 | 5:00 |
| Lightweight | Eddie Alvarez | def. | André Amado | TKO (punches) | 1 | 6:47 |
| Lightweight | Mitsuhiro Ishida | def. | Jung Bu-kyung | Decision (unanimous) | 2 | 5:00 |
| Lightweight | Katsuhiko Nagata | def. | Artur Oumakhanov | Decision (unanimous) | 2 | 5:00 |
| Lightweight | Luiz Firmino | def. | Kazuyuki Miyata | Submission (rear-naked choke) | 1 | 7:37 |
| Lightweight | Joachim Hansen | def. | Kotetsu Boku | Decision (unanimous) | 2 | 5:00 |

== Notes ==
- The 8th matchup of the tournament was initially to be postponed until Dream 2 due to the injuries of Vítor Ribeiro and Caol Uno along with Gilbert Melendez's prior commitment to Strikeforce. Dream officials have decided to directly seed Caol Uno into the 2nd round against Mitsuhiro Ishida as the 8th fighter.
- André Amado was hospitalized after losing to Eddie Alvarez and was unavailable for the Post-fight interviews
- Dream 1 announced attendance was 19,120 and its reported TV ratings on TBS were 8.9%
- 7 of the Fighters for Dream 2's 2008 Middleweight Grand Prix were announced:
  - (Japan) Kazushi Sakuraba
  - (South Korea) Yoon Dong-Sik
  - (Japan) Yoshihiro Akiyama
  - (Japan) Shungo Oyama
  - (Japan) Taiei Kin
  - (Japan) Masakatsu Funaki
  - (Japan) Ikuhisa Minowa

== See also ==
- Dream (mixed martial arts)
- List of Dream champions
- 2008 in DREAM
