= Dream (mixed martial arts) =

Mixed martial arts organization

- Type: Private
- Industry: Mixed martial arts promotion
- Predecessor: Pride Fighting Championships; Hero's; Yarennoka!
- Founded: February 13, 2008
- Founder: Sadaharu Tanikawa (President of FEG)
- Defunct: June 3, 2012; revived: October 25, 2012
- Successor: Rizin Fighting Federation
- Headquarters: Tokyo, Japan
- Key people: Keiichi Sasahara, Head and Matchmaker; Daisuke Sato, Productions Director
- Parent: Real Entertainment Co. Ltd.
- Website: Archived official website

Dream (styled DREAM in capitals) was a Japanese mixed martial arts (MMA) organization promoted by former PRIDE FC executives and K-1 promoter Fighting and Entertainment Group (FEG).

Dream replaced FEG's previous-run mixed martial arts fight series, Hero's. It retained many of the stylistic flourishes and personnel from Pride FC broadcasts, including fight introducer Lenne Hardt.

The promotion held more than 20 shows highlighting Japanese and international talent, establishing or enhancing the careers of fighters such as Shinya Aoki, Gesias Cavalcante, Tatsuya Kawajiri, Ronaldo Jacaré, Eddie Alvarez, Jason Miller, Kazushi Sakuraba, Gegard Mousasi and Alistair Overeem.

Dream became defunct as FEG went bankrupt in 2012, ending with a final New Year's Eve event later that year. In 2015, former Pride FC president Nobuyuki Sakakibara and several former Pride employees founded Rizin Fighting Federation as a successor.

== History ==
=== Formation ===
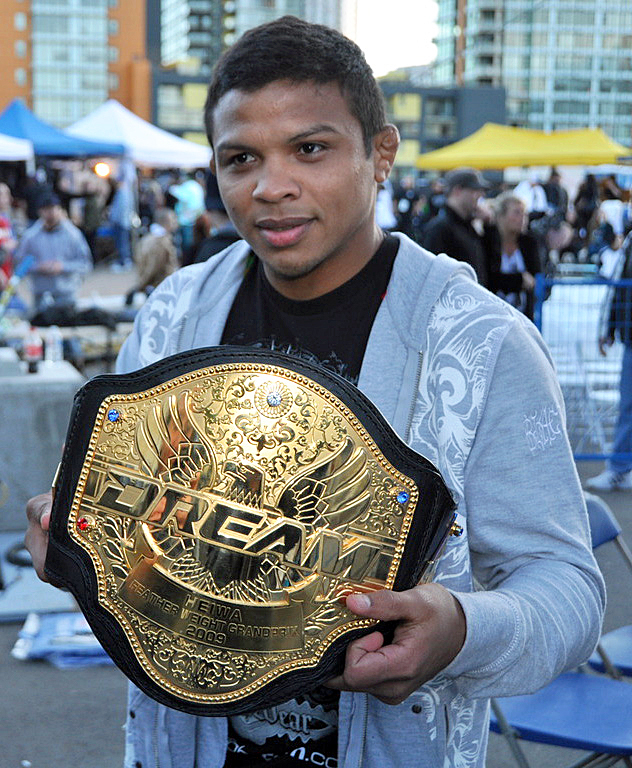
Bibiano Fernandes and his DREAM Bantamweight championship belt

After Zuffa acquired Pride, former Dream Stage Entertainment executives put on a collaborative New Year's Eve mixed martial arts event with Shooto, M-1 Global, and the Fighting and Entertainment Group, called Yarennoka!. While the event was intended to be a farewell show for Pride, its success and further petitioning by Japanese MMA fans (including a petition with more than 3,000 signatures) prompted the FEG and the DSE staff to combine their efforts and form a new promotion.

Their new promotion was confirmed on February 13, 2008, along with Hero's dissolution. All of Hero's' fighters were confirmed (such as Hero's champions Norifumi "Kid" Yamamoto, Yoshihiro Akiyama and JZ Calvan) to be part of the new promotion along with the additions of Mirko "Cro Cop" Filipović, Shinya Aoki, Kazushi Sakuraba, Mitsuhiro Ishida, and Hayato "Mach" Sakurai. Another notable announcement was Dream's partnership with M-1 Global, who confirmed that they would allow the last Heavyweight Champion of Pride (and the winner of the 2004 Heavyweight Grand Prix), Fedor Emelianenko, to fight in their events. Emelianenko was present at the Dream press conference to promote the alliance between the two shows.

=== Partnerships ===
On May 2, 2008, Dream aired for the first time in the United States with a repeat of Dream 1 on HDNet. A repeat of Dream 2 was aired the following day, while Dream 3 was aired live on May 11. The promotion's later events would air as a part of the network's HDNet Fights series.

On May 10, 2008, Dream announced the working partnership with US promotion EliteXC. The two groups intended to share fighters and eventually co-promote shows. However, EliteXC went bankrupt before the alliance could materialize.

On August 5, 2009, Strikeforce CEO Scott Coker announced that the promotions had signed an alliance under which they would exchange fighters.

On November 28, 2011, Dream and ONE Fighting Championship announced an agreement to co-promote events and exchange fighters.

On January 17, 2012, ProElite announced a partnership with Dream for fighter exchanges and possible co-promoted shows.

=== Cessation of business operations ===
On May 16, 2012, Sadaharu Tanikawa officially declared the bankruptcy of FEG. The promotion was then managed by its parent company, Real Entertainment Co. Ltd., and by June 3, 2012, Dream had effectively gone out of business.

The promotion's final show, "Dream.18: Special NYE 2012", was announced for December 31, 2012, under the financial backing of kickboxing promotion Glory Sports International. The event promoted mixed martial arts and kickboxing bouts at Saitama Super Arena in Saitama, Japan, carrying on the tradition of fight events every New Year's Eve.

== Rules ==
=== Weight classes ===
Dream had 7 weight classes. Unlike Hero's, each weight class had a champion with a defendable title.

- Bantamweight – 61 kilograms (134 lb)
- Featherweight – 65 kilograms (143 lb)
- Lightweight – 70 kilograms (154 lb)
- Welterweight – 76 kilograms (168 lb)
- Middleweight – 84 kilograms (185 lb)
- Light Heavyweight – 93 kilograms (205 lb)
- Heavyweight – no upper limit

=== Round length ===
- Standard bouts initially consisted of a 10-minute first round and a five-minute second round. Beginning with Dream 17 in September 2011, non-title bouts used three five-minute rounds and title bouts used five five-minute rounds.

=== Judging ===
- Fights were to be judged in their entirety by three judges, not on a round-by-round ten-point-must basis (more common to North American promotions).
- A winner was always to be declared, as draws were not possible.

=== Attire ===
Dream allowed fighters latitude in their choice of attire, but open finger gloves, a mouthguard and a protective cup were mandatory. Fighters were allowed to use tape on parts of their body or to wear a gi top, gi pants, wrestling shoes, kneepads, elbow pads, or ankle supports at their own discretion, though each had to be checked by the referee before the fight.

=== Fouls and violations ===
- Stomps and soccer kicks to the head of a grounded opponent were not allowed (unless both fighters were on the ground), but they were allowed to the rest of the body.
- Elbows to the head were prohibited.
- If there was a 15 kilograms (33 lb) or more weight difference between the fighters, knees to the head of a grounded opponent were not allowed.
- A fighter was considered grounded when any part of the body other than the soles of the feet touched the canvas.
- Strikes to the back of the head were not allowed.

=== Tournament substitutions ===
In an opening or quarterfinal round that ended in a no contest, a fighter who could continue advanced. If a winner could not continue because of injury, the defeated fighter could replace them; if neither could continue, FEG selected a replacement. Later tournament rounds used reserve-bout and other priority rules, subject to promoter discretion.

== Final champions ==
Division	Upper weight limit	Champion	Since	Title Defenses
Heavyweight	Unlimited	(Netherlands) Alistair Overeem	December 31, 2010 (Dynamite!! 2010)	
Light Heavyweight	93 kg (205.0 lb)	(Netherlands) Gegard Mousasi	September 25, 2010 (Dream 16)	1
Middleweight	84 kg (185.2 lb)	(Netherlands) Gegard Mousasi	September 23, 2008 (Dream 6)	
Welterweight	76 kg (167.6 lb)	(Lithuania) Marius Zaromskis	July 20, 2009 (Dream 10)	1
Lightweight	70 kg (154.3 lb)	(Japan) Shinya Aoki	October 6, 2009 (Dream 11)	2
Featherweight	65 kg (143.3 lb)	(Japan) Hiroyuki Takaya	December 31, 2010 (Dynamite!! 2010)	2
Bantamweight	61 kg (134.5 lb)	(Brazil) Bibiano Fernandes	December 31, 2011 (Fight For Japan: Genki Desu Ka Omisoko 2011)	0

=== Tournament finalists ===
Year	Weight Division	Champion	Finalist
2008	Lightweight	(Norway) Joachim Hansen	(Japan) Shinya Aoki
2008	Middleweight	(Netherlands) Gegard Mousasi	(Brazil) Ronaldo Souza
2009	Welterweight	(Lithuania) Marius Zaromskis	(United States) Jason High
2009	Featherweight	(Brazil) Bibiano Fernandes	(Japan) Hiroyuki Takaya
2009	Superhulk (openweight)	(Japan) Ikuhisa Minowa	(Cameroon) Rameau Thierry Sokoudjou
2010	Light Heavyweight	(Netherlands) Gegard Mousasi	(Japan) Tatsuya Mizuno
2011	Japan Bantamweight	(Japan) Hideo Tokoro	(Japan) Masakazu Imanari
2011	Bantamweight	(Brazil) Bibiano Fernandes	(United States) Antonio Banuelos

== Notable fighters ==
=== Bantamweight ===
- (United States) Antonio Banuelos
- (Japan) Yoshiro Maeda
- (Japan) Hideo Tokoro
- (Japan) Kenji Osawa
- (Japan) Masakazu Imanari
- (Japan) Keisuke Fujiwara
- (Japan) Atsushi Yamamoto
- (Brazil) Bibiano Fernandes (Dream Bantamweight Champion)
- (Brazil) Rodolfo Marques

=== Featherweight ===
- (Norway) Joachim Hansen
- (Japan) Tatsuya Kawajiri
- (Japan) Hiroyuki Takaya (Dream Featherweight Champion)
- (Japan) Daiki Hata
- (Japan) Mitsuhiro Ishida
- (Japan) Akiyo Nishiura
- (Japan) Takeshi Inoue
- (Japan) Kazuhisa Watanabe
- (Japan) Kazuyuki Miyata
- (Japan) Caol Uno

=== Lightweight ===
- (United States) Rich Clementi
- (United States) Shane Nelson
- (United States) Drew Fickett
- (United States) Rob McCullough
- (Brazil) Andre Amade
- (Brazil) Willamy Freire
- (Brazil) Gesias Calvancante
- (Brazil) Vítor Ribeiro
- (Brazil) Marcus Aurélio
- (Japan) Shinya Aoki (Dream Lightweight Champion)
- (Japan) Daisuke Nakamura
- (Japan) Koutetsu Boku
- (Japan) Tatsuya Kawajiri
- (Japan) Katsunori Kikuno
- (Japan) Katsuhiko Nagata
- (Japan) Satoru Kitaoka

=== Welterweight ===
- (Lithuania) Marius Zaromskis (Dream Welterweight Champion)
- (United States) Jason High
- (Belgium) Tarec Saffiedine
- (South Korea) Jung Bu-Kyung
- (Nigeria) Andy Ologun
- (Brazil) Yan Cabral
- (Japan) Kazushi Sakuraba
- (Japan) Kuniyoshi Hironaka
- (Japan) Ryo Chonan
- (Japan) Hayato Sakurai
- (Japan) Yuya Shirai

=== Middleweight ===
- (France) Karl Amoussou
- (Croatia) Zelg Galesic
- (United States) Gerald Harris
- (South Korea) Dong Sik Yoon
- (Japan) Shungo Oyama
- (Japan) Taiei Kin
- (Japan) Kiyoshi Tamura
- (Japan) Kazuhiro Nakamura

=== Light Heavyweight ===
- (Netherlands) Gegard Mousasi (Dream Light Heavyweight Champion)
- (Netherlands) Melvin Manhoef
- (United States) Ralek Gracie
- (Cameroon) Rameau Thierry Sokoudjou
- (Japan) Tatsuya Mizuno
- (Japan) Hiroshi Izumi
- (South Africa) Trevor Prangley

=== Heavyweight ===
- (New Zealand) Mark Hunt
- (France) Jérôme Le Banner
- (Russia) Fedor Emelianenko
- (United States) Bob Sapp
- (United States) Todd Duffee
- (United States) Jeff Monson
- (American Samoa) Siala-Mou "Mighty Mo" Siliga
- (United Kingdom) James Thompson
- (South Korea) Hong Man Choi
- (Japan) Katsuyori Shibata
- (Japan) Satoshi Ishii
- (Japan) Ikuhisa Minowa
- (Netherlands) Alistair Overeem
- (Croatia) Mirko Cro Cop

== Events ==
In America, the promotion was aired on HDNet.

#	Event title	Date	Arena	Location	Attendees	Broadcast
24	Dream 18	December 31, 2012	Saitama Super Arena	Saitama, Saitama, Japan	10,651	SkyPerfect
23	Fight For Japan: Genki Desu Ka Omisoka 2011	December 31, 2011	Saitama Super Arena	Saitama, Saitama, Japan	24,606	Tokyo Broadcasting System; HDNet
22	Dream 17	September 24, 2011	Saitama Super Arena	Saitama, Saitama, Japan	9,270	HDNet
21	Dream: Japan GP Final	July 16, 2011	Ariake Coliseum	Tokyo, Japan	8,142	HDNet
20	Dream: Fight for Japan!	May 29, 2011	Saitama Super Arena	Saitama, Saitama, Japan	6,522	HDNet
19	Dynamite!! 2010	December 31, 2010	Saitama Super Arena	Saitama, Saitama, Japan	26,729	Tokyo Broadcasting System; HDNet
18	Dream 16	September 25, 2010	Nippon Gaishi Hall	Nagoya, Aichi, Japan	9,304	Tokyo Broadcasting System; HDNet
17	Dream 15	Jul 10, 2010	Saitama Super Arena	Saitama, Saitama, Japan	13,028	Tokyo Broadcasting System; HDNet
16	Dream 14	May 29, 2010	Saitama Super Arena	Saitama, Saitama, Japan	12,712	Tokyo Broadcasting System; HDNet
15	Dream 13	March 22, 2010	Yokohama Arena	Yokohama, Kanagawa, Japan	13,712	Tokyo Broadcasting System; HDNet
14	Fields Dynamite!! The Power of Courage 2009	December 31, 2009	Saitama Super Arena	Saitama, Saitama, Japan	45,606	Tokyo Broadcasting System; HDNet
13	Dream 12: Cage of Dreams	October 25, 2009	Osaka-jo Hall	Osaka, Osaka, Japan	10,112	Tokyo Broadcasting System; HDNet
12	Dream 11: Featherweight Grand Prix 2009 Final Round	October 6, 2009	Yokohama Arena	Yokohama, Kanagawa, Japan	14,039	Tokyo Broadcasting System; HDNet
11	Dream 10: Welterweight Grand Prix 2009 Final Round	July 20, 2009	Saitama Super Arena	Saitama, Saitama Prefecture, Japan	11,970	Tokyo Broadcasting System; HDNet
10	Dream 9: Featherweight Grand Prix 2009 Second Round	May 26, 2009	Yokohama Arena	Yokohama, Kanagawa, Japan	15,009	Tokyo Broadcasting System; HDNet
9	Dream 8: Welterweight Grand Prix 2009 First Round	April 5, 2009	Nippon Gaishi Hall	Nagoya, Aichi, Japan	9,129	Tokyo Broadcasting System; HDNet
8	Dream 7: Featherweight Grand Prix 2009 First Round	March 8, 2009	Saitama Super Arena	Saitama, Saitama, Japan	19,528	Tokyo Broadcasting System; HDNet
7	Fields Dynamite!! 2008	December 31, 2008	Saitama Super Arena	Saitama, Saitama, Japan	25,634	Tokyo Broadcasting System; HDNet
6	Dream 6: Middleweight Grand Prix 2008 Final Round	September 23, 2008	Saitama Super Arena	Saitama, Saitama, Japan	20,929	SkyPerfect; HDNet
5	Dream 5: Lightweight Grand Prix 2008 Final Round	July 21, 2008	Osaka-jo Hall	Osaka, Osaka, Japan	11,986	SkyPerfect; HDNet
4	Dream 4: Middleweight Grand Prix 2008 Second Round	June 15, 2008	Yokohama Arena	Yokohama, Kanagawa, Japan	14,037	SkyPerfect; HDNet
3	Dream 3: Lightweight Grand Prix 2008 Second Round	May 11, 2008	Saitama Super Arena	Saitama, Saitama, Japan	21,789	SkyPerfect; HDNet
2	Dream 2: Middleweight Grand Prix 2008 First Round	April 29, 2008	Saitama Super Arena	Saitama, Saitama, Japan	21,397	SkyPerfect; HDNet
1	Dream 1: Lightweight Grand Prix 2008 First Round	March 15, 2008	Saitama Super Arena	Saitama, Saitama, Japan	19,120	Tokyo Broadcasting System; HDNet

== Event locations ==
- Total event number: 24

These cities have hosted the following numbers of Dream events as of Dream 18:

- Japan (24)

Saitama – 15
Yokohama – 4
Nagoya – 2
Osaka – 2
Tokyo - 1
