= K-1 PREMIUM 2007 Dynamite!! =

K-1 martial arts event in 2007

- The poster for K-1 PREMIUM 2007 Dynamite!!
- Promotion: K-1, Hero's
- Date: December 31, 2007
- Venue: Kyocera Dome Osaka
- City: Osaka, Japan
- Attendance: 47,928

Event chronology
K-1 PREMIUM 2006 Dynamite!!	K-1 PREMIUM 2007 Dynamite!!	Dynamite!! 2008

K-1 PREMIUM 2007 Dynamite!! was an annual kickboxing and mixed martial arts event held by K-1 and Hero's on New Year's Eve, Monday December 31, 2007 at the Kyocera Dome Osaka in Osaka, Japan. It featured 7 HERO'S MMA rules fights, 4 K-1 rules fights, and 4 fights in the K-1 Under 18 Tournament.

The event attracted a sellout crowd of 47,918 to the Kyocera Dome Osaka, and was broadcast live across Japan on the TBS Network.

A fight between Sergei Kharitonov and Mighty Mo was scheduled to take place, but Mo was forced to withdraw due to leg injuries incurred during his last fight in K-1.

== Results ==
HERO'S MMA Rules
Weight class				Method	Round	Time	Notes
Middleweight	Kazushi Sakuraba	def.	Masakatsu Funaki	Submission (kimura)	1	6:25
Bantamweight	Norifumi Yamamoto	def.	Rani Yahya	TKO (punches and soccer kicks)	2	3:11
Openweight	Bob Sapp	def.	Bobby Ologun	TKO (punches	1	4:10
K-1 Rules
	Masato	def.	Choi Yong-soo	TKO (corner stoppage)	3	0:51
	Nicholas Pettas	def.	Kim Young-hyun	KO (right punch)	2	0:41
	Musashi	def.	Bernard Ackah	KO (left hook)	3	1:26
K-1 Japan U-18 Tournament - Final
	Yudai	def.	Hiroya	Split Decision (2-1)
HERO'S MMA Rules
Openweight	Kiyoshi Tamura	def.	Hideo Tokoro	Submission (armbar)	3	3:08
Openweight	Zuluzinho	def.	Minowaman	TKO (corner stoppage)	3	2:13
Middleweight	Melvin Manhoef	def.	Yosuke Nishijima	TKO (punches)	1	1:49
Lightweight	Joachim Hansen	def.	Kazuyuki Miyata	Submission (rear-naked choke)	2	1:33
K-1 Japan U-18 Tournament - Semi Final
	Yudai	def.	Kenji Kubo	Unanimous Decision (3-0)
	Hiroya	def.	Kizaemon Saiga	Unanimous Decision (3-0)
K-1 Japan U-18 Tournament - Semi Final
	Takashi Tachikawa	def.	Yoshihisa Inoue	KO	1	1:43
K-1 Under 18 Tournament – Reserve Fight
	Ryo Murakoshi	def.	Arata Fujimoto	KO	1	2:00

== See also ==
- List of K-1 events
- List of male kickboxers
- Yarennoka!
