= K-1 PREMIUM 2006 Dynamite!! =

K-1 martial arts event in 2006

- Promotion: K-1, Hero's
- Date: December 31, 2006
- Venue: Kyocera Dome Osaka
- City: Osaka, Japan
- Attendance: 51,930

Event chronology
K-1 PREMIUM 2005 Dynamite!!	K-1 PREMIUM 2006 Dynamite!!	K-1 PREMIUM 2007 Dynamite!!

K-1 PREMIUM 2006 Dynamite!! was an annual kickboxing and mixed martial arts event held by K-1 and Hero's on New Year's Eve, Sunday, December 31, 2006, at the Kyocera Dome Osaka in Osaka, Japan. It featured 10 HERO'S MMA rules fights, and 4 K-1 rules fights.

The event attracted a sellout crowd of 51,930 to the Kyocera Dome Osaka, and was broadcast live across Japan on the TBS Network.

The main event between Kazushi Sakuraba and Yoshihiro Akiyama was ruled to be a No Contest after it was determined that Akiyama had applied an illegal substance.

Dynamite!! 2006 was also the final time Genki Sudo stepped into the ring as after his match, Sudo shocked the crowd by announcing his retirement.

== Results ==
Main card
Weight class				Method	Round	Time	Notes
Middleweight MMA	(Japan) Yoshihiro Akiyama	def.	(Japan) Kazushi Sakuraba	NC (overturned)	1	5:37	(Note: Originally a TKO win for Akiyama; ruled no contest due to greasing.)
Lightweight K-1	(Japan) Masato	def.	(Japan) Satoru Suzuki	TKO (low kicks)	2	2:22
Heavyweight MMA	(South Korea) Hong-man Choi	def.	(Nigeria) Bobby Ologun	TKO (punches)	1	0:16
Lightweight MMA	(Japan) Norifumi "KID" Yamamoto	def.	(Hungary) Istvan Majoros	KO (knee to the liver)	1	3:46
Lightweight MMA	(Japan) Genki Sudo	def.	(United States) Damacio Page	Submission (triangle choke)	1	3:05
Heavyweight K-1	(Netherlands) Semmy Schilt	def.	(Australia) Peter Graham	Decision (unanimous)	5	3:00
Heavyweight K-1	(Japan) Musashi	def.	(South Korea) Randy Kim	KO	3	0:33
Heavyweight K-1	(Morocco) Badr Hari	def.	(Denmark) Nicholas Pettas	TKO (injury)	2	1:28
Heavyweight MMA	(Brazil) Giant Silva	def.	(Japan) Akebono	Submission (kimura)	1	1:02
Lightweight MMA	(Japan) Hideo Tokoro	def.	(Brazil) Royler Gracie	Decision (unanimous)	3	5:00
Middleweight MMA	(Japan) Taiei Kin	def.	(Japan) Tokimitsu Ishizawa	KO (head kick)	1	2:48
Lightweight MMA	(Japan) Katsuhiko Nagata	def.	(Japan) Shuichiro Katsumura	TKO (punches	1	4:12
Lightweight MMA	(Nigeria) Andy Ologun	def.	(Japan) Ken Kaneko	Decision (unanimous)	3	5:00
Heavyweight MMA	(Japan) Yukiya Naito	def.	(South Korea) Dong-wook Kim	TKO (punches)	1	1:11

== See also ==
- List of K-1 events
- List of male kickboxers
- PRIDE Shockwave 2006
