= ProElite =

MMA promoter based in Los Angeles

ProElite, Inc.
- Company type: Public
- Industry: Sports promotion
- Founded: 2006
- Headquarters: Los Angeles, California, United States
- Key people: William Kelly President & Chief Operating Officer, Glenn Golenberg, Douglas De Luca, Lloyd Bryan Adams, Executive Producer http://lloydbryanadams.wordpress.com/
- Subsidiaries: EliteXC, Cage Rage, Spirit MC, Icon Sport, King of the Cage
- Website: http://www.proelite.com/

ProElite, Inc. is an American entertainment and media company involved in the promotion of mixed martial arts (MMA).

== First incarnation ==
Founded by boxing promoter Gary Shaw and his son Jared in 2006 in partnership with Showtime Networks Inc. (a CBS Corporation subsidiary), the firm initially promoted live MMA events broadcast on Showtime and Showtime PPV under the EliteXC promotional banner.

CBS contracted with ProElite to show live events on prime time network television with the first airing scheduled for May 31, 2008.

A focal point of ProElite's live event promotions was EliteXC. Running its first show in 2007, it quickly became one of the most visible brands in mixed martial arts in the United States. ProElite also acquired several long-standing mixed martial arts promotions since its founding, including King of the Cage, Hawaii-based Icon Sport, and British promotion Cage Rage. The company also had working relationships with Rumble on the Rock, Japanese-based DREAM, South Korean-based Spirit MC, and Northern California-based Strikeforce.

ProElite also operated ProElite.com, a web portal with social networking for MMA fighters and fans and live streams of MMA bouts not broadcast on Showtime.

While EliteXC was a pioneer in MMA's growth (in addition to its groundbreaking network television deal, its first card included the first televised women's MMA match when Gina Carano faced Julie Kedzie, and it continued to air female matches on many of its shows) its run came to an end after the event EliteXC: Heat, which was held in October 2008 and broadcast live on CBS. Held near star fighter Kimbo Slice's hometown of Miami, the event was designed to give the wildly popular viral video street-fighter legitimacy as a martial artist by matching him up against a well-known talent in Ken Shamrock. However just hours before the fight, Shamrock was declared unfit to fight due to a cut over his eye. He was replaced by the much lesser-known Seth Petruzelli who was originally scheduled to fight on the undercard. Petruzelli knocked Slice out in 14 seconds, but more importantly Petruzelli did a radio interview two days later where he divulged that ProElite had offered him financial incentives to keep the fight on the feet and protect Slice's reputation. The Florida state athletic commission instantly investigated the company for match fixing: while the allegations were unproven, it effectively doomed ProElite's reputation as a legitimate promoter. It eventually sold its tape library, rights to fighters under contract, and most importantly its Showtime/CBS broadcast agreement to Strikeforce chairman Scott Coker in 2009.

== Second incarnation ==
In March 2011 ProElite was rumored to be the unsuccessful second bidder against the UFC in an attempt to acquire rival MMA promotion Strikeforce. The offer was said to exceed 40 million dollars. Principals at ProElite immediately confirmed the companies intention to re enter the MMA live event promotional business as they had with the record breaking Kimbo Slice events on CBS.

Rumors immediately began circulating that ProElite was targeted as a strategic acquisition by either the UFC or an unidentified third party investor wishing to enter the MMA promotional space. PELE.PK stock jumped from .01 per share to more than .20 per share in two days as investors realized the stock routinely traded at $15 per share while ProElite was promoting live events.

In June 2011, Stratus Media Group secured a 95% ownership of ProElite. The group confirmed their intention to return to promoting mixed martial arts with former ICON owner T. Jay Thompson and former Strikeforce matchmaker Rich Chou brought on board to run the show. The company's return show took place on August 27, 2011 in Hawaii and streamed live on Sherdog.com.

ProElite announced a partnership with DREAM to share fighters shortly before it went out of business. This partnership made possible a fight between Kendall Grove and Ikuhisa Minowa in ProElite 3 in early 2012. After this event ProElite has seemingly gone out of business.

== Events ==
Event	Date	Location	Venue	Broadcast
ProElite 3: Grove vs. Minowa	January 21, 2012	Honolulu, Hawaii, United States	Neal S. Blaisdell Center	HDNet
ProElite 2: Big Guns	November 5, 2011	Moline, Illinois, United States	iWireless Center	HDNet
ProElite: Arlovski vs. Lopez	August 27, 2011	Honolulu, Hawaii, United States	Neal S. Blaisdell Center	Sherdog.com

== Key people ==
- T. Jay Thompson – Head of Fight Operations
- Rich Chou – Matchmaker

== Controversy ==
As the company was established the man who initially had the idea to launch ProElite, Wallid Ismail, was pressured to have signed out all of his rights, with the other stakeholders gaining complete control over the startup.
