= Jung Bu-kyung =

South Korean judoka and mixed martial artist

- Born: 26 May 1978 (age 48); Seoul, South Korea
- Height: 1.70 m (5 ft 7 in)
- Weight: 70 kg (154 lb; 11 st 0 lb)
- Style: Judo
- Team: Team Yoon; Yoshida Dojo

Mixed martial arts record
- Total: 4
- Wins: 0
- Losses: 4
- By knockout: 2
- By decision: 2

Other information
- Mixed martial arts record from Sherdog
- Judo career
- Weight class: ‍–‍60 kg, ‍–‍66 kg

Judo achievements and titles
- Olympic Games: (silver) (2000)
- World Champ.: R32 (1999, 2001)
- Asian Champ.: (gold) (1999, 2003)
Medal record
Men's judo
Representing South Korea
Olympic Games
Silver medal – second place	2000 Sydney	‍–‍60 kg
Asian Championships
Gold medal – first place	1999 Wenzhou	‍–‍60 kg
Gold medal – first place	2003 Jeju	‍–‍66 kg

Profile at external judo databases
- IJF: 53063
- JudoInside.com: 7622
- Last updated on: 30 October 2024

Jung Bu-kyung (Korean: 정부경; Hanja: 鄭富競 born 26 May 1978) is a South Korean judoka and professional mixed martial artist.

== Judo career ==
Jung began judo at the age of eleven under the instruction of his father. He won a gold medal at the 1998 World University Judo Championships in Prague. Two years later, he won a silver medal at the -60 kg category of the 2000 Summer Olympics. In the final, he lost to three-time Olympic champion Tadahiro Nomura by ippon only fourteen seconds into the match.

After graduation from Korea National Sport University in 2001, he continued to train with the KRA Judo Team. He moved up in weight to the 66 kg class, and won a gold medal at the 2003 Asian Judo Championships in Jeju. However, Jung failed to qualify for the 2004 Olympic Games by losing to Bang Gui-man in the national qualification match.

== Mixed martial arts career ==
Jung made his MMA debut on 31 December 2007 against Japanese grappler Shinya Aoki at Yarennoka!. Jung was replacing American Top Team's Gesias Calvancanti, who tore a ligament in his left knee while training to fight Aoki. Although Jung lost by unanimous decision, he proved to be a formidable opponent in his mixed martial arts debut.

== Mixed martial arts record ==
Professional record breakdown
4 matches	0 wins	4 losses
By knockout	0	2
By decision	0	2

Res.	Record	Opponent	Method	Event	Date	Round	Time	Location	Notes
Loss	0–4	Katsunori Kikuno	TKO (kick to the body and soccer kicks)	DEEP - 40 Impact	February 20, 2009	1	4:15	Tokyo, Japan	DEEP Lightweight Tournament Semi-finals
Loss	0–3	Daisuke Nakamura	KO (punch)	Dream 3: Lightweight Grand Prix 2008 Second Round	May 11, 2008	2	1:05	Saitama, Japan	
Loss	0–2	Mitsuhiro Ishida	Decision (unanimous)	Dream 1: Lightweight Grand Prix 2008 First Round	March 15, 2008	2	5:00	Saitama, Japan	
Loss	0–1	Shinya Aoki	Decision (unanimous)	Yarennoka!	December 31, 2007	2	5:00	Saitama, Japan	
