= Melvin Manhoef =

Dutch mixed martial arts fighter

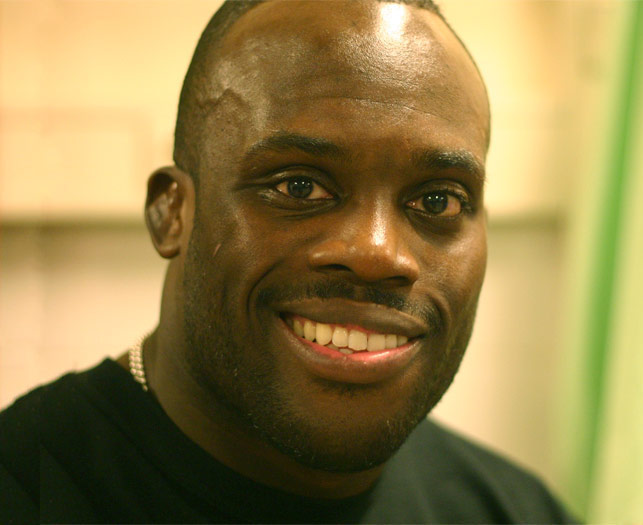
- Born: 11 May 1976 (age 50); Paramaribo, Suriname
- Other names: No Mercy
- Nationality: Dutch
- Height: 5 ft 8 in (173 cm)
- Weight: 205 lb (93 kg; 14 st 9 lb)
- Division: Welterweight (MMA); Middleweight (MMA); Light Heavyweight (MMA); Cruiserweight (Kickboxing); Heavyweight (Kickboxing & MMA)
- Reach: 71 in (180 cm)
- Style: Kickboxing
- Stance: Orthodox
- Fighting out of: Amsterdam, Netherlands
- Team: Manhoef Fight & Fitness (2012–present); Mike's Gym (2005–2012, 2017); Chakuriki Gym (1998–2005); Rock Gym (1995–1998)
- Trainer: Said El Badaoui
- Rank: 1st degree black belt in Brazilian Jiu-Jitsu under Remco Pardoel
- Years active: 1995–2022 (MMA); 1996–2017 (Kickboxing)

Kickboxing record
- Total: 53
- Wins: 38
- By knockout: 27
- Losses: 15
- By knockout: 7

Mixed martial arts record
- Total: 52
- Wins: 32
- By knockout: 29
- By decision: 3
- Losses: 17
- By knockout: 7
- By submission: 8
- By decision: 2
- Draws: 1
- No contests: 2

Other information
- Notable relatives: Million Manhoef, son Ismael Londt, nephew Cedric Manhoef, cousin
- Notable students: Ismael Londt, Cedric Manhoef
- Mixed martial arts record from Sherdog
- Last updated on: 21 June 2014

Melvin Manhoef (born 11 May 1976) is a Surinamese-born Dutch retired mixed martial artist and kickboxer. In kickboxing, he is a former It's Showtime Middleweight Champion, and in MMA he was the Cage Rage Light Heavyweight Champion. In mixed martial arts, he competed in Bellator's Light heavyweight and Middleweight division and has also formerly competed for Strikeforce, DREAM, RINGS, It's Showtime, K-1, ONE FC, and KSW. Manhoef is known for his fearsome knockout power: 29 of his 32 wins have come via knockout, the highest percentage of any MMA fighter with at least 15 wins. After the kickboxing ranking system combat press was established, Melvin was placed top ten at middleweight.

== Background ==
Manhoef was born in Paramaribo, Suriname. When he was three years old his family moved to Rotterdam, the Netherlands. Manhoef played soccer during his youth, and was introduced to Muay Thai by his younger brother, Moreno.

== Mixed martial arts career ==
=== Early career ===
At the age of 18, Manhoef had his first fight, which he won by decision. He made his comeback in September 2001, as part of Chakuriki Gym. In 2004, Manhoef entered the Cage Rage promotion in London. He became the British Cage Rage Light Heavyweight Champion by beating Fabio Piamonte at Cage Rage 13. He defended his title for almost two years, until entering the K-1's MMA affiliate promotion Hero's in 2006. He won his first fight at Hero's 4 against Shungo Oyama by technical knockout in first round.

=== K-1, Hero's & DREAM ===
Melvin has switched his main focus to MMA over the past couple of years. He lost to Dong-sik Yoon by submission armbar in K-1 Dynamite!! USA, he defeated Bernard Ackah at K-1 Hero's Middleweight Tournament Opening Round, and also got a TKO win against Fábio Silva, a Chute Boxe fighter, by TKO in K-1 Hero's Middleweight GP Final. At Dream 4 Melvin fought Kazushi Sakuraba. Manhoef and Sakuraba circled the ring for the first minute of the fight, before Manhoef dropped Sakuraba with a hard right head kick and finished him via TKO (hammerfists) at 90 seconds into Round 1. With the win, Melvin had advanced to the semifinal round of the DREAM Middleweight Grand Prix. At Dream 6 Melvin fought Gegard Mousasi as the tournament dictated. Wary of Manhoef's standup, Mousasi quickly took the fight to the ground despite attempts to shrug him with a sprawl. Mousasi took Manhoef's back until scrambling into a triangle choke at 1:28 of the first round, surviving a powerful slam attempt from Manhoef while he had the submission secured. Mousasi went on to win the DREAM Middleweight Grand Prix.

At Dynamite!! 2008 Melvin fought Mark Hunt as a late alternate at heavyweight, despite usually functioning at two weight classes below his opponent. Regardless of the size disadvantage, he knocked down the iron-jawed Samoan in 18 seconds and followed with punches as he was postured over Hunt, until the referee stopped the fight. It was the first time Hunt was finished by knockout in his MMA career. He fought former WEC Middleweight Champion Paulo Filho on 20 July 2009 at Dream 10. Despite early success on the feet with his striking offensive, Manhoef was taken down and submitted via armbar in the first round.

=== Strikeforce ===
Manhoef signed a multi-year fight contract with Strikeforce. Manhoef made his debut for the organization against Robbie Lawler on 30 January 2010 at Strikeforce: Miami. Despite a strong start with heavy leg kicks and punches, he was knocked out at 3:33 in the first round.

Manhoef fought Tatsuya Mizuno at Dream 15 and lost by submission.

Manhoef returned to the United States in March 2011, facing Tim Kennedy at Strikeforce: Feijao vs. Henderson. He lost the fight via submission in the first round.

=== ONE Fighting Championship ===
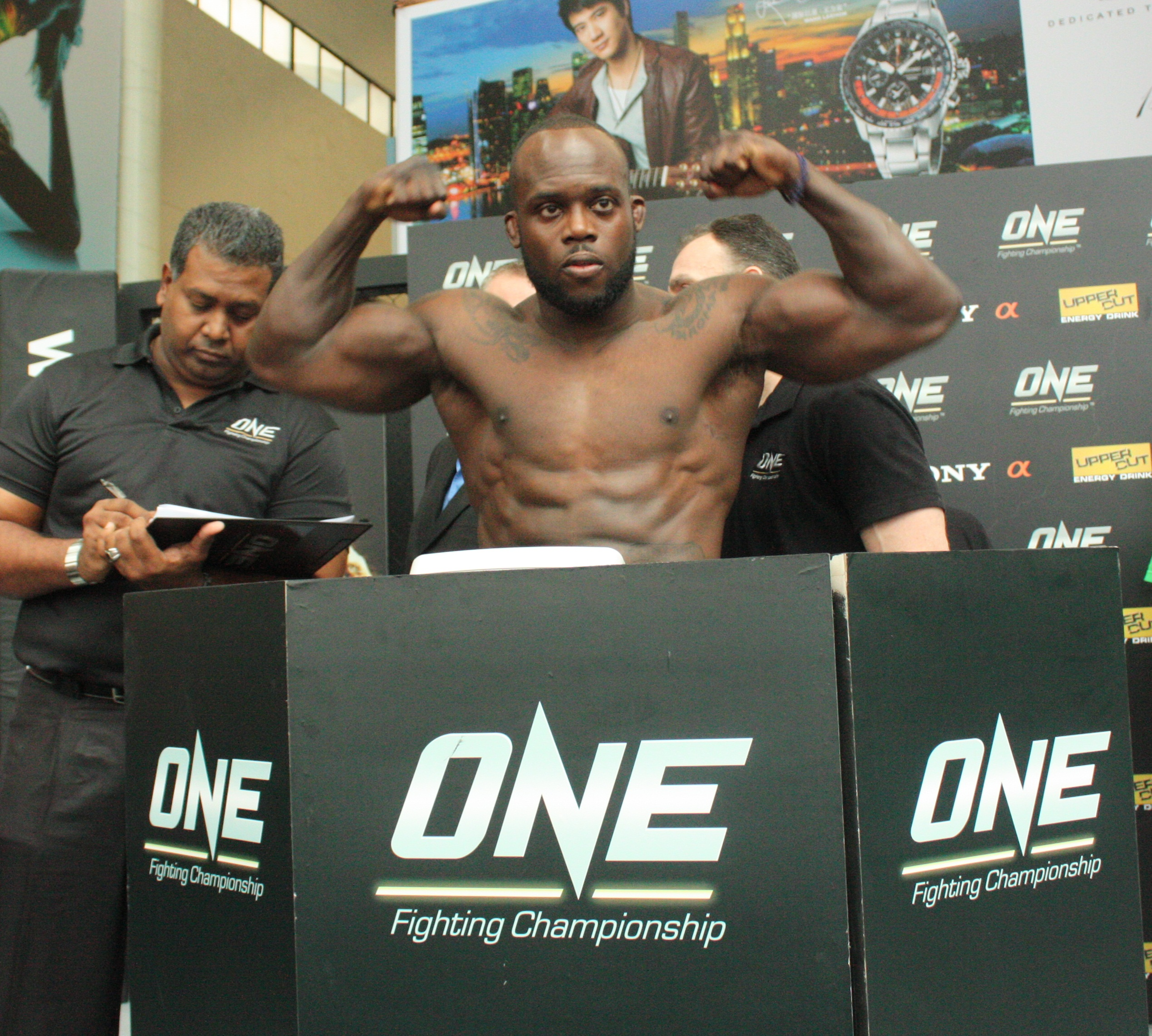
Manhoef in 2012.

On 31 January 2012 it was announced that Manhoef had signed with ONE Fighting Championship and would be fighting Renato Sobral in the main event at ONE Fighting Championship 3. However, Sobral pulled out of the fight and Manhoef faced Yoshiyuki Nakanishi. The fight ended in a No Contest due to an accidental injury to Manhoef's leg in round 1. Manhoef scored a knockout victory on 6 October 2012 against Ryo Kawamura, followed by a quick knockout of Dennis Kang on 31 December 2012. Melvin is now on a three-fight win streak in MMA and has gone 4–0 on New Year's Eve.

Manhoef trained at Black House in the United States. He helped his teammate Lyoto Machida train for a fight with Dan Henderson. Manhoef openly hoped to sign with the UFC after visiting UFC 156 in Las Vegas and meeting with Dana White.

In 2013 Manhoef fought UFC veteran Brock Larson at ONE FC on 5 April. After controlling the standup and Larson literally running away from him, Manhoef was repeatedly taken down in the last two rounds and Larson won via unanimous decision. He lost to Mamed Khalidov at KSW23 on 8 June 2013.

He lost to Zabit Samedov by unanimous decision in the semi-finals of the 93 kg/205 lb kickboxing tournament at Legend 2: Invasion in Moscow, Russia on 9 November 2013.

Manhoef faced Evangelista Santos in a much-anticipated rematch for the Gringo Super Fight Welterweight title on 27 April. The fight was Melvin's first at 170 lbs. Manhoef won the bout via TKO, early in the first round.

=== Glory ===
It was announced during the Glory 15: Istanbul broadcast that Manhoef would be one of eight fighters competing in the Glory 17: Los Angeles - Last Man Standing middleweight tournament in Inglewood, California, United States on 21 June 2014. He lost to Filip Verlinden in the quarter-finals, suffering a head kick knockdown in round one before losing a majority decision.

=== Bellator MMA ===
On 21 July 2014, Bellator MMA announced that they signed Paul Daley along with Melvin Manhoef.

Manhoef made his Bellator debut against Doug Marshall, in a middleweight bout, at Bellator 125 on 19 September 2014. He won the fight via knockout in the first round.

Manhoef faced Glory veteran Joe Schilling on 15 November 2014 at Bellator 131. After a dominant first round that saw Manhoef drop Schilling twice, he lost the fight in the second round due to a knockout.

Manhoef next faced Alexander Shlemenko on 13 February 2015 at Bellator 133. He lost via knockout early in the second round. On 17 March 2015 Shlemenko was suspended indefinitely for failing a post fight drug test with elevated testosterone levels. The fight result was changed to a no contest.

Manhoef faced Rafael Carvalho on 20 May 2016 for the Bellator Middleweight World Championship at Bellator 155. Manhoef lost a controversial split decision. Bellator announcer Jimmy Smith called it one of the worst decisions he had ever seen in the promotion; likewise, 5 of 5 media outlets scored the bout in favor of Manhoef.

An immediate rematch with Carvalho was scheduled to take place at Bellator 168, on 10 December 2016. However, Carvalho pulled out of the fight due to injury. The rematch eventually took place on 8 April 2017 at Bellator 176. Manhoef lost the bout via knockout due to a head kick in the fourth round.

Manhoef made a comeback to kickboxing and faced Remy Bonjasky for the fourth time, after losing three times, on 29 October 2017. Manhoef won the bout by decision. He announced his retirement from kickboxing and stated that he would focus on his MMA career.

In May 2018 it was revealed that Manhoef and Bellator had come to terms for an exclusive, multi-fight contract.

Manhoef was scheduled to face Chidi Njokuani on 30 November 2018 at Bellator 210. However, on 1 November 2018 it was reported that Manhoef pulled out from the event due to injury and he was replaced by John Salter.

After over two years away from MMA action, Manhoef returned and faced Kent Kauppinen at Bellator 223. He won the fight by unanimous decision.

As the ultimate bout of his prevailing contract, Manhoef next headlined Bellator Milan against Yannick Bahati on 12 October 2019. Manhoef won the bout via technical knockout in the first round. Subsequently, Manhoef signed a two-fight contract extension with the organization.

Manhoef was next expected to face Simon Biyong at Bellator 248 on 10 October 2020. However, the bout was scrapped and Manhoef instead faced Corey Anderson at Bellator 251 on 5 November 2020. He was defeated via second-round TKO.

Manhoef was scheduled to fight Yoel Romero on 6 May 2022 at Bellator 280. However, Manhoef withdrew from the bout due to a hand injury and was replaced by Alex Polizzi. The pair was rescheduled to meet at Bellator 285 on 23 September 2022. He lost the bout via knockout on the ground via elbows in the third round. Manhoef retired from mixed martial arts after the fight.

=== Post Bellator ===
Despite his retirement months ago, Manhoef faced Igor Tanabe on 28 December 2022 at Inoki Bom-Ba-Ye x Ganryujima. He was submitted via heel hook in the first round and once again announced his retirement.

== Business career ==
Manhoef founded a kickboxing and MMA-promotion named World Fighting League.

== Personal life ==
On 29 March 2022, Manhoef and other neighbourhood residents apprehended three alleged burglars who had targeted his home near Amsterdam. He stopped the men from fleeing in a car by performing a PIT maneuver, and then, with the assistance of neighbours, detained the suspects until police arrived. Manhoef gave a statement to police afterwards, although legal ramifications of his actions are unclear.

His son is professional footballer Million Manhoef.

== Championships and accomplishments ==
=== Kickboxing ===
- It's Showtime
  - It's Showtime 85 kg MAX champion (One time, first)

=== Mixed martial arts ===
- Cage Rage
  - Cage Rage Light Heavyweight Champion (One time)
    - Two Successful Title Defenses
- DREAM
  - DREAM Middleweight Grand Prix Semifinalist
- K-1 Hero's
  - 2006 Hero's Light Heavyweight Finalist
- Sherdog
  - 2012 All-Violence First Team
- Gringo Super Fight
  - 2014 GSF Welterweight Champion

== Mixed martial arts record ==
Professional record breakdown
52 matches	32 wins	17 losses
By knockout	29	7
By submission	0	8
By decision	3	2
Draws	1	
No contests	2	

Res.	Record	Opponent	Method	Event	Date	Round	Time	Location	Notes
Loss	32–17–1 (2)	Igor Tanabe	Submission (inverted heel hook)	Inoki Bom-Ba-Ye x Ganryujima	28 December 2022	1	1:58	Tokyo, Japan	Catchweight (203 lb) bout.
Loss	32–16–1 (2)	Yoel Romero	KO (elbows)	Bellator 285	23 September 2022	3	3:34	Dublin, Ireland	
Loss	32–15–1 (2)	Corey Anderson	TKO (elbows)	Bellator 251	5 November 2020	2	2:34	Uncasville, Connecticut, United States	
Win	32–14–1 (2)	Yannick Bahati	TKO (punches)	Bellator 230	12 October 2019	1	2:29	Milan, Italy	
Win	31–14–1 (2)	Kent Kauppinen	Decision (unanimous)	Bellator 223	22 June 2019	3	5:00	London, England	Return to Light Heavyweight.
Loss	30–14–1 (2)	Rafael Carvalho	KO (head kick)	Bellator 176	8 April 2017	4	3:15	Turin, Italy	For the Bellator Middleweight World Championship.
Loss	30–13–1 (2)	Rafael Carvalho	Decision (split)	Bellator 155	20 May 2016	5	5:00	Boise, Idaho, United States	For the Bellator Middleweight World Championship.
Win	30–12–1 (2)	Hisaki Kato	KO (punch)	Bellator 146	20 November 2015	1	3:43	Thackerville, Oklahoma, United States	
NC	29–12–1 (2)	Alexander Shlemenko	NC (overturned by CSAC)	Bellator 133	13 February 2015	2	1:25	Fresno, California, United States	Originally a KO (spinning backfist) win for Shlemenko; overturned after he tested positive for Anabolic steroids.
Loss	29–12–1 (1)	Joe Schilling	KO (punches)	Bellator 131	15 November 2014	2	0:32	San Diego, California, United States	
Win	29–11–1 (1)	Doug Marshall	KO (punch)	Bellator 125	19 September 2014	1	1:45	Fresno, California, United States	Return to Middleweight.
Win	28–11–1 (1)	Evangelista Santos	TKO (punches)	Gringo Super Fight 10	27 April 2014	1	0:46	Rio de Janeiro, Brazil	Won the Gringo Super Fight Welterweight Championship.
Loss	27–11–1 (1)	Mamed Khalidov	Submission (guillotine choke)	KSW 23	8 June 2013	1	2:09	Gdańsk, Poland	Catchweight (192 lb) bout; Khalidov missed weight.
Loss	27–10–1 (1)	Brock Larson	Decision (unanimous)	ONE FC: Kings and Champions	5 April 2013	3	5:00	Kallang, Singapore	
Win	27–9–1 (1)	Denis Kang	TKO (knee to the body)	Dream 18	31 December 2012	1	0:50	Saitama, Japan	
Win	26–9–1 (1)	Ryo Kawamura	KO (punch)	ONE FC: Rise of Kings	6 October 2012	1	4:40	Kallang, Singapore	
Win	25–9–1 (1)	Kim Jae-young	Decision (split)	Road FC 009	15 September 2012	3	5:00	Wonju, South Korea	
NC	24–9–1 (1)	Yoshiyuki Nakanishi	NC (both fighters cut by clash of legs)	ONE FC: War of the Lions	31 March 2012	1	2:08	Kallang, Singapore	Catchweight (88 kg); gash on Manhoef's leg rendered him unable to continue.
Loss	24–9–1	Tim Kennedy	Submission (rear-naked choke)	Strikeforce: Feijao vs. Henderson	5 March 2011	1	3:41	Columbus, Ohio, United States	
Loss	24–8–1	Tatsuya Mizuno	Submission (kimura)	Dream 15	July 10, 2010	1	7:38	Saitama, Japan	Light Heavyweight bout. 2010 Dream Light Heavyweight Grand Prix Semifinal.
Loss	24–7–1	Robbie Lawler	KO (punch)	Strikeforce: Miami	January 30, 2010	1	3:33	Sunrise, Florida, United States	
Win	24–6–1	Kazuo Misaki	TKO (punches)	Dynamite!! 2009	December 31, 2009	1	1:49	Saitama, Japan	
Loss	23–6–1	Paulo Filho	Submission (armbar)	Dream 10	July 20, 2009	1	2:35	Saitama, Japan	
Win	23–5–1	Mark Hunt	KO (punches)	Dynamite!! 2008	December 31, 2008	1	0:18	Saitama, Japan	Heavyweight bout.
Loss	22–5–1	Gegard Mousasi	Submission (triangle choke)	Dream 6	September 23, 2008	1	1:28	Saitama, Japan	2008 Dream Middleweight Grand Prix Semifinal.
Win	22–4–1	Kazushi Sakuraba	KO (punches)	Dream 4	June 15, 2008	1	1:30	Yokohama, Japan	2008 Dream Middleweight Grand Prix Quarterfinal.
Win	21–4–1	Kim Dae-won	TKO (knee and punches)	Dream 3	May 11, 2008	1	4:08	Saitama, Japan	Return to Middleweight. 2008 Dream Middleweight Grand Prix Alternate bout.
Win	20–4–1	Yosuke Nishijima	TKO (punches)	K-1 PREMIUM 2007 Dynamite!!	December 31, 2007	1	1:49	Osaka, Japan	
Win	19–4–1	Fábio Silva	TKO (punches)	Hero's 10	September 17, 2007	1	1:00	Yokohama, Japan	Middleweight bout.
Win	18–4–1	Bernard Ackah	KO (punches)	Hero's 9	July 16, 2007	1	2:13	Yokohama, Japan	
Loss	17–4–1	Yoon Dong-sik	Submission (armbar)	K-1 Dynamite!! USA	June 2, 2007	2	1:17	Los Angeles, California, United States	Middleweight bout.
Win	17–3–1	Yoshiki Takahashi	TKO (punches)	Hero's 8	March 12, 2007	1	2:36	Nagoya, Japan	
Loss	16–3–1	Yoshihiro Akiyama	Submission (armbar)	Hero's 7	October 9, 2006	1	1:58	Yokohama, Japan	2006 Hero's Light Heavyweight Grand Prix Final.
Win	16–2–1	Shungo Oyama	TKO (punches)	Hero's 7	October 9, 2006	1	1:04	Yokohama, Japan	2006 Hero's Light Heavyweight Grand Prix Semifinal.
Win	15–2–1	Crosley Gracie	TKO (punches)	Hero's 6	August 5, 2006	1	9:12	Tokyo, Japan	2006 Hero's Light Heavyweight Grand Prix Quarterfinal.
Win	14–2–1	Ian Freeman	KO (punches)	Cage Rage 17	July 1, 2006	1	0:17	London, England	Defended the Cage Rage Light Heavyweight Championship.
Win	13–2–1	Shungo Oyama	TKO (doctor stoppage)	Hero's 4	March 15, 2006	1	2:51	Tokyo, Japan	Heavyweight bout.
Win	12–2–1	Evangelista Santos	KO (punches)	Cage Rage 15	February 4, 2006	2	3:51	London, England	Defended the Cage Rage Light Heavyweight Championship.
Win	11–2–1	Fabio Piamonte	KO (punches)	Cage Rage 13	September 10, 2005	1	0:51	London, England	Return to Light Heavyweight. Won the Cage Rage Light Heavyweight Championship.
Win	10–2–1	Paul Cahoon	TKO (punches)	CFC 4: Cage Carnage	July 3, 2005	1	N/A	Liverpool, England	Middleweight bout.
Win	9–2–1	Bob Schrijber	Decision (unanimous)	It's Showtime Boxing & MMA Event 2005 Amsterdam	June 12, 2005	2	5:00	Amsterdam, Netherlands	
Win	8–2–1	Ladislav Zak	TKO (corner stoppage)	Queens Fight Night	April 30, 2005	1	0:37	Eindhoven, Netherlands	Light Heavyweight bout.
Win	7–2–1	Matthias Riccio	TKO (punches)	Cage Rage 10	February 26, 2005	1	3:01	London, England	
Loss	6–2–1	Rodney Glunder	KO (punch)	It's Showtime 2004 Amsterdam	May 20, 2004	2	4:43	Amsterdam, Netherlands	Return to Heavyweight.
Win	6–1–1	Slavomir Molnar	KO (punches)	Heaven or Hell 4	April 8, 2004	1	N/A	Prague, Czech Republic	Welterweight debut.
Win	5–1–1	Alexandr Garkushenko	TKO (punches)	M-1 MFC: Russia vs. the World 5	April 6, 2003	1	6:57	Saint Petersburg, Russia	Light Heavyweight bout.
Loss	4–1–1	Bob Schrijber	TKO (punches)	2H2H 11: Simply the Best	March 16, 2003	1	4:04	Rotterdam, Netherlands	
Win	4–0–1	Mika Ilmén	KO (punch)	It's Showtime – As Usual / Battle Time	September 29, 2002	1	0:35	Haarlem, Netherlands	Heavyweight debut.
Win	3–0–1	Paul Cahoon	TKO (corner stoppage)	Rings Holland: Saved by the Bell	June 2, 2002	2	2:07	Amsterdam, Netherlands	Light Heavyweight debut.
Win	2–0–1	Husein Cift	KO (punches)	Hoogwoud Free Fight Gala	December 15, 2001	1	1:50	Hoogwoud, Netherlands	
Draw	1–0–1	Rodney Glunder	Draw	Rings Holland: The Kings of the Magic Ring	June 20, 1999	2	5:00	Utrecht, Netherlands	
Win	1–0	Jordy Jonkers	TKO (palm strike)	Battle of Amstelveen II	December 2, 1995	2	3:37	Amstelveen, Netherlands	Middleweight debut.

== Kickboxing record ==
Kickboxing record (Incomplete)
38 Wins (27 (T)KO's), 15 Losses
Date	Result	Opponent	Event	Location	Method	Round	Time
2017-10-29	Win	(Netherlands) Remy Bonjasky	WFL: Manhoef vs. Bonjasky, Final 16	Almere, Netherlands	Decision	3	3:00
2016-04-16	Loss	(Romania) Alexandru Negrea	Bellator Kickboxing 1	Turin, Italy	Decision (Unanimous)	3	3:00
2014-07-25	Loss	(Spain) César Córdoba	International Fighting Championship	Badalona, Spain	TKO (Referee stoppage)	1	2:59
2014-06-21	Loss	(Belgium) Filip Verlinden	Glory 17: Los Angeles - Middleweight Last Man Standing Tournament, Quarter Finals	Inglewood, California, USA	Decision (Majority)	3	3:00
2013-11-09	Loss	(Azerbaijan) Zabit Samedov	Legend 2: Invasion, Semi Finals	Moscow, Russia	Decision (Unanimous)	3	3:00
2012-01-28	Loss	(Suriname) Tyrone Spong	It's Showtime 2012 in Leeuwarden	Leeuwarden, Netherlands	Decision (Unanimous)	3	3:00
2010-05-29	Loss	(Turkey) Gokhan Saki	It's Showtime 2010 Amsterdam	Amsterdam, Netherlands	TKO (Referee stoppage)	2	N/A
2009-09-26	Loss	(Netherlands) Remy Bonjasky	K-1 World Grand Prix 2009 Final 16	Seoul, Republic of Korea	Decision (Unanimous)	3	3:00
Fails to qualify for K-1 World Grand Prix 2009 Final.
2009-08-29	Win	(Hungary) Dénes Rácz	It's Showtime 2009 Budapest	Budapest, Hungary	TKO (Referee stoppage)	3	0:46
Wins It's Showtime 85MAX World title.
2009-08-11	Win	(Russia) Ramazan Ramazanov	K-1 World Grand Prix 2009 in Tokyo, Quarter Finals	Tokyo, Japan	KO (Punch)	1	2:16
Despite victory is unable to continue in the tournament due to a shin injury.
2009-05-16	Win	(Germany) Stefan Leko	It's Showtime 2009 Amsterdam	Amsterdam, Netherlands	TKO (Referee stoppage)	3	N/A
2009-03-28	Loss	(Japan) Kyotaro	K-1 World GP 2009 in Yokohama, Semi Finals	Yokohama, Japan	KO (Right hook)	1	2:02
2008-12-06	Win	(Poland) Paul Slowinski	K-1 World GP 2008 Final, Reserve Fight	Tokyo, Japan	KO (Left hook)	1	2:26
2008-04-26	Loss	(Netherlands) Remy Bonjasky	K-1 World GP 2008 in Amsterdam	Amsterdam, Netherlands	KO (Flying right high kick)	3	2:32
2007-06-23	Win	(Russia) Ruslan Karaev	K-1 World Grand Prix 2007 in Amsterdam	Amsterdam, Netherlands	KO (Left hook)	1	0:31
2006-12-02	Loss	(New Zealand) Ray Sefo	K-1 World Grand Prix 2006, Reserve Fight	Tokyo, Japan	KO (Right hook)	1	0:40
2006-05-13	Win	(Japan) Tatsufumi Tomihira	K-1 World Grand Prix 2006 in Amsterdam, Quarter Finals	Amsterdam, Netherlands	KO (Punches)	1	2:10
Despite victory is unable to continue in the tournament due to injury.
2005-04-09	Win	(Japan) Yuji Sakuragi	Muay Thai Champions League XIV	Amsterdam, Netherlands	TKO (Referee stoppage)	2	N/A
2005-02-12	Loss	(Bosnia and Herzegovina) Dzevad Poturak	Gala Gym Alkmaar	Alkmaar, Netherlands	KO (Punches)	3	2:55
2002-04-21	Win	(Greece) Stavros Anastiadis	Victory or Hell 3	Amsterdam, Netherlands	KO (Knee strike)	1	N/A
2002-02-24	Loss	(Netherlands) Remy Bonjasky	K-1 World Grand Prix 2002 Preliminary Netherlands, Quarter Finals	Arnhem, Netherlands	Decision (Unanimous)	3	3:00
1999-03-27	Loss	(Suriname) Ashwin Balrak	The Fights of the Gladiators	Amsterdam, Netherlands	Decision (Unanimous)	5	3:00
1998-09-26	Win	(France) Jean Jacques	The Fight of the Champions	Amsterdam, Netherlands	KO (Left hook)	2	N/A
1996-09-28	Loss	(Netherlands) Lesley Nijman	Thai/Kickboxing Zaandam	Zaandam, Netherlands	KO	N/A	N/A
1996-03-16	Loss	(Morocco) Samir Benazzouz	Thai/Kickboxing Nijmegen	Nijmegen, Netherlands	KO	3	N/A
Legend: Win Loss Draw/No contest Notes

== See also ==
- List of K-1 events
- List of K-1 champions
- List of It's Showtime champions
- List of male kickboxers
- List of Bellator MMA alumni
- List of male mixed martial artists
