= Gesias Cavalcante =

Brazilian mixed martial artist

- Born: July 6, 1983 (age 43); Rio de Janeiro, Brazil
- Other names: JZ
- Height: 5 ft 8 in (1.73 m)
- Weight: 155 lb (70 kg; 11.1 st)
- Division: Lightweight
- Style: Luta Livre, BJJ, Kickboxing
- Fighting out of: Deerfield Beach, Florida, United States
- Team: Fight Sports Deerfield Beach
- Rank: Black Belt in Luta Livre; Black belt in Brazilian jiu-jitsu
- Years active: 2003–present

Kickboxing record
- Total: 2
- Losses: 2

Mixed martial arts record
- Total: 37
- Wins: 22
- By knockout: 7
- By submission: 10
- By decision: 5
- Losses: 12
- By knockout: 6
- By submission: 1
- By decision: 5
- Draws: 1
- No contests: 2

Other information
- Mixed martial arts record from Sherdog

Gesias Cavalcante (born July 6, 1983) is a Brazilian professional mixed martial artist currently competing in the Lightweight division. He was the 2006 and 2007 K-1 HERO Middleweight Champion, and has also fought for Strikeforce, DREAM, Shooto, World Series of Fighting, and Cage Rage. Cavalcante also participated in the Dynamite!! USA event.

== Mixed martial arts career ==
While Cavalcante is primarily an MMA fighter, he made his K-1 debut fighting against Masato in the 2007 World Max tournament, losing via decision.

On September 17, 2007, Cavalcante won the K-1 HERO'S' 2007 Middleweight (70 kg) tournament by defeating Brazilian jiu-jitsu specialist Vítor Ribeiro by TKO in the first round and Andre Amade by submission via armbar in the finals.

Cavalcante had agreed to fight former PRIDE Fighting Championship Lightweight standout Shinya Aoki at Yarennoka! but withdrew from the fight due to a knee ligament injury. The match was rescheduled for March 15, 2008, at Dream 1 to kick off the new DREAM promotion at the Saitama Super Arena.

Early in the first round, the referee stopped the action when Cavalcante apparently landed illegal elbow strikes to the back of Aoki's neck. The ringside doctor announced that Aoki was unable to continue due to the injury and Cavalcante apologized for the incident. The fight resulted in a no contest. Elbow strikes to the neck and spine area are illegal under DREAM rules. Aoki was later found to have sustained concussion of the cervical vertebra.

They had their rematch on April 29, 2008, at Dream 2. Cavalcante was defeated by Aoki by unanimous decision. However, he sustained a severely bruised rib and tore cartilage in his costal area during the match.

Cavalcante's next fight was set to be against Joachim Hansen at Dynamite!! 2008 on December 31, 2008, but the bout was canceled the day of the event due to Hansen not passing pre-fight medicals and subsequently being hospitalized for a "head injury".

=== Strikeforce ===
Cavalcante signed a 4-fight deal with Strikeforce in June 2010. He made his debut against former Strikeforce Lightweight Champion Josh Thomson, losing by a controversial unanimous decision.

Cavalcante's next fight was against lightweight prospect Justin Wilcox at Strikeforce: Overeem vs. Werdum. The fight ended in a no contest after Cavalcante poked Wilcox's eye.

Cavalcante fought Bobby Green on July 30, 2011, at Strikeforce: Fedor vs. Henderson. He won the fight via split decision.

On the 19th of May 2012, he lost a split decision to Isaac Vallie-Flagg at Strikeforce: Barnett vs. Cormier and was subsequently released from Strikeforce.

On June 30, 2012, Cavalcante was knocked out for the first time in his seven-year career by Luis Palomino at CFA 07 in Coral Gables, Florida.

=== Kickboxing ===
He competed at the Shoot Boxing World Tournament 2012 in Tokyo, Japan on November 17, 2012. The Shoot Boxing World Tournament, or "S-Cup", is an eight-man, 70 kg/154 lb standing vale tudo tournament that combines striking, throws and submissions held by the Shoot Boxing Association once every two years. Cavalcante was drawn against Hiroki Shishido at the quarter-final stage and lost by majority decision.

He signed with the Glory kickboxing promotion in August 2013. Cavalcante was set to face Steve Moxon at Glory 11: Chicago - Heavyweight World Championship Tournament in Hoffman Estates, Illinois, US on October 12, 2013 but withdrew due to a lingering hand injury and was replaced by Reece McAllister.

=== World Series of Fighting ===
Cavalcante faced off against UFC veteran TJ O'Brien at WSOF 1: Arlovski vs. Cole. He won by submission due to an Achilles lock only 63 seconds into the fight.

JZ next fought undefeated Justin Gaethje at WSOF 2. Cavalcante suffered a deep cut on the hairline due to a knee from Gaethje that forced the referee to stop the fight at 2:27 of the opening round.

In his third fight for the promotion, Cavalcante took on Strikeforce and 14 time UFC veteran Tyson Griffin at WSOF 4. After a back and forth fight, early in the third round Cavalcante took down an exhausted Griffin and proceeded to land a barrage of undefended punches from the back mount thus winning the fight via TKO.

Cavalcante was scheduled to rematch Justin Gaethje for the inaugural WSOF Lightweight Championship at WSOF 8 on January 18, 2014, in Hollywood, Florida, but pulled out due to an undisclosed injury.

Cavalcante faced Melvin Guillard on July 5, 2014, at WSOF 11. He lost the fight via TKO in the second round.

Hawn came out of retirement to face Rick Hawn on October 21, 2022, at Combat FC 2. He won the bout via guillotine choke in the second round.

== Grappling career ==
Cavalcante competed at the IBJJF Miami Open on April 29 and 30, 2023 where he won a silver medal in the absolute division.

He competed against Leonardo Silva in a superfight at Blue Collar FC: American Dream Conference on September 1, 2023 and won the match by submission.

Cavalcante competed at the IBJJF Miami Fall Open on November 5, 2023, winning a gold medal in the master 2 middleweight division.

Cavalcante competed against Gregor Gracie at Pit Submission Series 3 on March 23, 2024. He lost the match by submission. He then won a bronze medal in the no gi middleweight division of the IBJJF Fort Lauderdale Open 2024 on October 20, 2024.

Cavalcante competed against Piter Frank in the co-main event of ADXC 7 on November 17, 2024. He won the match by decision.

Cavalcante faced Jake O’Driscoll at Who’s Number One 29 on July 25, 2025. He won the match by submission with a heel hook.

== Championships and accomplishments ==
- K-1 HERO's
  - K-1 HERO's 2006 Middleweight Grand Prix Championship
  - K-1 HERO's 2007 Middleweight Grand Prix Championship
- Shooto
  - Shooto Americas Welterweight Championship (1 Time, First, Last)
- Titan Fighting Championship
  - Titan FC Lightweight Championship (1 Time)

== Kickboxing record ==
Kickboxing record
0 wins (0 KOs), 2 losses, 0 draws
Date	Result	Opponent	Event	Location	Method	Round	Time	Record
2012-11-17	Loss	(Japan) Hiroki Shishido	Shoot Boxing World Tournament 2012, Quarter Finals	Tokyo, Japan	Decision (majority)	3	3:00	0-2
2007-06-28	Loss	(Japan) Masato	K-1 World MAX 2007 World Tournament Final Elimination, First Round	Tokyo, Japan	Decision (unanimous)	3	3:00	0-1
Legend: Win Loss Draw/No contest Notes

== Mixed martial arts record ==
Professional record breakdown
37 matches	22 wins	12 losses
By knockout	7	6
By submission	10	1
By decision	5	5
Draws	1	
No contests	2	

Res.	Record	Opponent	Method	Event	Date	Round	Time	Location	Notes
Win	22–12–1 (2)	Rick Hawn	Submission (guillotine choke)	Combat FC 2	October 21, 2022	2	3:41	Wilmington, Massachusetts, United States	Return to Welterweight.
Loss	21–12–1 (2)	Erivan Pereira	TKO (punches)	Brave CF 11	April 13, 2018	2	2:21	Belo Horizonte, Minas Gerais, Brazil	
Loss	21–11–1 (2)	Alan Omer	TKO (punches)	Brave CF 9: The Kingdom of Champions	November 17, 2017	3	3:30	Isa Town, Bahrain	
Loss	21–10–1 (2)	Kurt Holobaugh	TKO (punches)	Titan FC 44	May 19, 2017	4	2:45	Pembroke Pines, Florida	For the interim Titan FC Lightweight Championship
Win	21–9–1 (2)	Robert Turnquest	Decision (unanimous)	Titan FC 42	December 2, 2016	3	5:00	Coral Gables, Florida	Catchweight (160 lb) bout.
Loss	20–9–1 (2)	Freddy Assuncao	Technical Submission (guillotine choke)	Titan FC 40: Cavalcante vs. Assuncao	August 5, 2016	4	0:24	Coral Gables, Florida	Lost Titan FC Lightweight Championship
Win	20–8–1 (2)	Pat Healy	KO (punches)	Titan FC 39: Cavalcante vs. Healy	June 10, 2016	1	2:07	Coral Gables, Florida	Won Titan FC Lightweight Championship
Win	19–8–1 (2)	Gele Qing	Submission (unknown)	KFU: Kungfu Union	September 21, 2014	1	N/A	Dalian, China	Catchweight (175 lb) bout.
Loss	18–8–1 (2)	Melvin Guillard	TKO (punches and elbows)	WSOF 11	July 5, 2014	2	2:36	Daytona Beach, Florida, United States	
Win	18–7–1 (2)	Tyson Griffin	TKO (punches)	WSOF 4	August 10, 2013	3	1:37	Ontario, California, United States	
Loss	17–7–1 (2)	Justin Gaethje	TKO (doctor stoppage)	WSOF 2	March 23, 2013	1	2:27	Atlantic City, New Jersey, United States	Due to a cut.
Win	17–6–1 (2)	TJ O'Brien	Submission (Achilles lock)	WSOF 1	November 3, 2012	1	1:03	Las Vegas, Nevada, United States	
Loss	16–6–1 (2)	Luis Palomino	KO (punches)	CFA 07: Never Give Up	June 30, 2012	3	1:41	Coral Gables, Florida, United States	
Loss	16–5–1 (2)	Isaac Vallie-Flagg	Decision (split)	Strikeforce: Barnett vs. Cormier	May 19, 2012	3	5:00	San Jose, California, United States	
Win	16–4–1 (2)	Bobby Green	Decision (split)	Strikeforce: Fedor vs. Henderson	July 30, 2011	3	5:00	Hoffman Estates, Illinois, United States	
NC	15–4–1 (2)	Justin Wilcox	NC (accidental eye poke)	Strikeforce: Overeem vs. Werdum	June 18, 2011	2	0:31	Dallas, Texas, United States	Cavalcante poked Wilcox in the eye.
Loss	15–4–1 (1)	Josh Thomson	Decision (unanimous)	Strikeforce: Diaz vs. Noons II	October 9, 2010	3	5:00	San Jose, California, United States	
Win	15–3–1 (1)	Katsunori Kikuno	Decision (split)	Dream 15	July 10, 2010	2	5:00	Saitama, Japan	
Loss	14–3–1 (1)	Tatsuya Kawajiri	Decision (unanimous)	Dream 9	May 26, 2009	2	5:00	Yokohama, Japan	
Loss	14–2–1 (1)	Shinya Aoki	Decision (unanimous)	Dream 2: Middleweight Grand Prix 2008 First Round	April 29, 2008	2	5:00	Saitama, Japan	
NC	14–1–1 (1)	Shinya Aoki	NC (illegal elbows)	Dream 1: Lightweight Grand Prix 2008 First Round	March 15, 2008	1	3:46	Saitama, Japan	Lightweight GP Opening Round; Aoki injured via illegal downward elbows to the back of the head.
Win	14–1–1	Andre Amade	Submission (armbar)	Hero's 10	September 17, 2007	1	4:48	Yokohama, Japan	Hero's 2007 Lightweight Grand Prix final.
Win	13–1–1	Vítor Ribeiro	TKO (punches)	Hero's 10	September 17, 2007	1	0:35	Yokohama, Japan	Hero's 2007 Lightweight Grand Prix semi-final.
Win	12–1–1	Nam Phan	TKO (punches)	Dynamite!! USA	June 2, 2007	1	0:26	Los Angeles, California, United States	Return to Lightweight.
Win	11–1–1	Caol Uno	Decision (majority)	Hero's 7	October 9, 2006	2	5:00	Yokohama, Japan	Hero's 2006 Welterweight (165 lb) Grand Prix final.
Win	10–1–1	Rani Yahya	Submission (guillotine choke)	Hero's 7	October 9, 2006	1	0:39	Yokohama, Japan	Hero's 2006 Welterweight (165 lb) Grand Prix semi-final.
Win	9–1–1	Hiroyuki Takaya	KO (flying knee)	Hero's 6	August 5, 2006	1	0:30	Tokyo, Japan	Hero's 2006 Welterweight (165 lb) Grand Prix quarter-final.
Win	8–1–1	Hidetaka Monma	TKO (punches)	Hero's 5	May 3, 2006	1	2:08	Tokyo, Japan	Hero's 2006 Welterweight (165 lb) Grand Prix opening round.
Win	7–1–1	Michihiro Omigawa	KO (punches)	Cage Rage 14	December 3, 2005	1	0:49	London, England, United Kingdom	
Draw	6–1–1	Ryan Schultz	Draw	SF 11: Rumble at the Rose Garden	July 9, 2005	3	5:00	Portland, Oregon, United States	
Win	6–1	Henry Matamoros	Decision (unanimous)	HOOKnSHOOT: The Return	April 2, 2005	3	5:00	Evansville, Indiana, United States	Won Shooto Americas Welterweight Championship
Win	5–1	Cengiz Dana	Submission (guillotine choke)	Cage Warriors 9: Xtreme Xmas	December 18, 2004	3	4:55	Sheffield, England, United Kingdom	
Win	4–1	Bart Palaszewski	Submission (guillotine choke)	IHC 8: Ethereal	November 20, 2004	1	1:03	Hammond, Indiana, United States	
Win	3–1	Sebastian Korschilgen	Submission (kimura)	Shooto: Switzerland 2	September 4, 2004	1	N/A	Zurich, Switzerland	
Loss	2–1	Joachim Hansen	Decision (majority)	Shooto: 7/16 in Korakuen Hall	July 16, 2004	3	5:00	Tokyo, Japan	
Win	2–0	Brad Mohler	Submission (achilles lock)	HOOKnSHOOT: Live	March 27, 2004	1	1:32	Evansville, Indiana, United States	
Win	1–0	Justin Wiesniewski	Submission (guillotine choke)	AFC 7	February 27, 2004	1	1:53	Fort Lauderdale, Florida, United States	

== Submission grappling record ==
? Matches, ? Wins, ? Losses, ? Draws
Result	Rec.	Opponent	Method	Event	Date	Location
Win	6–3–2	(Brazil) Vinicius de Jesus	Rear Naked Choke	Combat Jiu-Jitsu Worlds	June 6, 2021	Cancún, Mexico
Win	5–3–2	(United States) Tom Gallicchio	Arm Triangle Choke	Combat Jiu-Jitsu Worlds	June 6, 2021	Cancún, Mexico
Win	4–3–2	(United States) Saul Viayra	Heel Hook	Subversiv 5	May 1, 2021	Miami, United States
Loss	3–3–2	(United States) Jason Rau	Decision	Fight 2 Win 161	January 21, 2021	Miami, United States
Win	3–2–2	(United States) Justin Renick	Decision	Fight 2 Win 160	January 16, 2021	Miami, United States
Win	2–2–2	(United States) Nick Ronan	Decision	Fight 2 Win 157	November 14, 2020	Philadelphia, United States
Loss	1–2–2	(Brazil) Nicky Ryan	Inside Heel Hook	SubStars: Poirier vs. Tonon	February 21, 2020	Miami, United States
Draw	1–1–2	(United States) Anthony Smith	Decision	Quintet Ultra	December 12, 2019	Las Vegas, United States
Draw	1–1–1	(United States) Chad Mendes	Decision	Quintet Ultra	December 12, 2019	Las Vegas, United States
Win	1–1–0	(Brazil) Jorge Patino	Guillotine Choke	Kasai Super Series Orlando	July 4, 2019	Orlando, United States
Loss	0–1–0	(Iran) Alireza Noei	Decision · Points	SFT 9	January 19, 2019	São Paulo, Brazil

== See also ==
- List of male mixed martial artists
