= Hero's =

Japanese mixed martial arts promotion

- Type: Defunct
- Industry: Mixed martial arts promotion
- Headquarters: Japan
- Parent: Fighting and Entertainment Group

Hero's was a Japanese mixed martial arts promotion operated by Fighting and Entertainment Group, the parent entity behind kickboxing organization K-1. Grown from and branched off of K-1's earlier experiments in MMA, including the K-1 Romanex event and various MMA fights on its regular K-1 kickboxing cards, it held its first show on March 26, 2005. The promotion was handled by former Rings head Akira Maeda. At a press conference on February 13, 2008, FEG announced that they had discontinued Hero's and were creating a new mixed martial arts franchise, Dream, in collaboration with former Pride FC executives from Dream Stage Entertainment.

== History ==
Although not as popular worldwide as the Ultimate Fighting Championship or the now defunct Pride Fighting Championships, Hero's was very recognizable in the Japanese mixed martial arts scene, thanks in large part to the visibility and resources of FEG and K-1. Hero's events were sometimes co-sponsored and broadcast on the TBS national television network in Japan. In contrast to PRIDE and the UFC, Hero's promoted only three weight classes: middleweight (-70 kg/-154 lbs), light heavyweight (-85 kg/-187 lbs) and heavyweight (+85 kg/+187 lbs).

=== United States ===
On March 27, 2007, FEG (the Fighting Entertainment Group) held a press conference at the Los Angeles Coliseum to announce their first US event which was to be held on June 2, 2007. The show, named K-1 Dynamite!! USA, was a joint operated venture with the newly formed Elite XC, British MMA organization Cage Rage, BoDog Fight and the Korean-based Spirit MC. The show was broken down into two parts, with the first part (made up of three fights) being aired for free Showtime and the second part on pay-per-view.

=== Reformation into Dream ===
At a press conference on February 13, 2008, FEG announced that they discontinued Hero's and were creating a new mixed martial arts franchise, Dream, in collaboration with former Pride FC executives from Dream Stage Entertainment. In addition to established Hero's stars, (such as Calvancante, Akiyama, and Yamamoto) many other top fighters from around the world (such as Mirko "Cro Cop" Filipović and Shinya Aoki) joined the new promotion.

== Notable fighters ==
Many notable mixed martial artists competed in Hero's, including:

- (Australia) Sam Greco
- (Brazil) Antônio Silva
- (Brazil) Gesias Calvancante
- (Brazil) Hermes Franca
- (Brazil) Lyoto Machida
- (Brazil) Rani Yahya
- (Brazil) Royce Gracie
- (Brazil) Vítor Ribeiro
- (Canada) Carlos Newton
- (Canada) Denis Kang
- (El Salvador) Ivan Menjivar
- (Japan) Caol Uno
- (Japan) Genki Sudo
- (Japan) Hideo Tokoro
- (Japan) Hiroyuki Takaya
- (Japan) Kazuo Misaki
- (Japan) Kazushi Sakuraba
- (Japan) Kiuma Kunioku
- (Japan) Michihiro Omigawa
- (Japan) Norifumi Yamamoto
- (Japan) Shungo Oyama
- (Japan) Yoshihiro Akiyama
- (Japan) Yushin Okami
- (France) Jérôme Le Banner
- (Netherlands) Alistair Overeem
- (Netherlands) Melvin Manhoef
- (Netherlands) Peter Aerts
- (New Zealand) Ray Sefo
- (Norway) Joachim Hansen
- (Russia) Sergei Kharitonov
- (South Africa) Jan Nortje
- (South Korea) Kotetsu Boku
- (Trinidad and Tobago) Gary Goodridge
- (United Kingdom) Brad Pickett
- (United States) B.J. Penn
- (United States) Bob Sapp
- (United States) Don Frye
- (United States) Heath Herring
- (United States) Jake Shields
- (United States) Nam Phan
- (United States) Rich Clementi
- (United States) Brock Lesnar

== Hero's Grand Prix Champions ==
Year	Weight class	Champion	Runner-up
2005	Middleweight (70 kg (154.3 lb))	(Japan) Norifumi Yamamoto	(Japan) Genki Sudo
2006	Light heavyweight (85 kg (187.4 lb))	(Japan) Yoshihiro Akiyama	(Netherlands) Melvin Manhoef
2006	Middleweight (70 kg (154.3 lb))	(Brazil) Gesias Calvancante	(Japan) Caol Uno
2007	Middleweight (70 kg (154.3 lb))	(Brazil) Gesias Calvancante	(Brazil) André Amado

== Events ==
Event	Date	Location	Venue	Attendance
Hero's 1	March 26, 2005	Saitama, Japan	Saitama Super Arena	13,000
Hero's 2	July 6, 2005	Tokyo, Japan	Yoyogi National Gymnasium	
Hero's 3	September 7, 2005	Tokyo, Japan	Ariake Coliseum	
Hero's 2005 in Seoul	November 5, 2005	Seoul, South Korea	Olympic Gymnastics Arena	7,460
Hero's Lithuania 2005	November 26, 2005	Vilnius, Lithuania	Siemens Arena	
K-1 PREMIUM 2005 Dynamite!!	December 31, 2005	Osaka, Japan	Osaka Dome	53,025
Hero's 4	March 15, 2006	Tokyo, Japan	Nippon Budokan	
Hero's 5	May 3, 2006	Tokyo, Japan	Yoyogi National Gymnasium	
Hero's 6	August 5, 2006	Tokyo, Japan	Ariake Coliseum	
Hero's 7	October 9, 2006	Yokohama, Japan	Yokohama Arena	
Hero's Lithuania 2006	November 11, 2006	Vilnius, Lithuania	Siemens Arena	
K-1 PREMIUM 2006 Dynamite!!	December 31, 2006	Osaka, Japan	Osaka Dome	51,930
Hero's 8	March 12, 2007	Nagoya, Japan	Nippon Gaishi Hall	
Dynamite!! USA	June 2, 2007	(United States) Los Angeles, California, USA	Los Angeles Memorial Coliseum	18,340
Hero's 9: Middleweight Tournament Opening Round	July 16, 2007	Yokohama, Japan	Yokohama Arena	
Hero's 10: Middleweight Tournament Final	September 17, 2007	Yokohama, Japan	Yokohama Arena	
Hero's 2007 in Korea	October 28, 2007	Seoul, South Korea	Jangchung Gymnasium	
Hero's Lithuania 2007	November 10, 2007	Vilnius, Lithuania	Siemens Arena	
K-1 PREMIUM 2007 Dynamite!!	December 31, 2007	Osaka, Japan	Osaka Dome	47,928

== Event locations ==
* Total event number: 19

- Japan (13)

Tokyo – 5
Yokohama – 3
Osaka – 3
Nagoya – 1
Saitama – 1

- Lithuania (3)

Vilnius – 3

- South Korea (2)

Seoul – 2

- United States (1)

Los Angeles, California – 1
