= SKY PerfecTV! =

Japanese satellite TV service

- Type: Incentive
- Founded: 1994
- Headquarters: Japan
- Owner: SKY Perfect JSAT Corporation
- Parent: SKY Perfect JSAT Corporation
- Website: www.skyperfectv.co.jp/eng/

SKY PerfecTV! (スカパー！, Sukapā!) is a direct broadcast satellite (DBS) service that provides satellite television, audio programming and interactive television services to households in Japan, owned by parent company SKY Perfect JSAT Corporation.

SKY PerfecTV! is also a direct broadcast satellite (DBS) service. While SKY PerfecTV! Premium Service uses DVB-S and DVB-S2, SKY PerfecTV! Basic Service uses ISDB-S.

	SKY PerfecTV! Basic Service (スカパー！)	SKY PerfecTV! Premium Service (スカパー！プレミアム)	SKY PerfecTV! Premium Service Hikari (スカパー！プレミアム光)
System	DVB-S	DVB-S2	ISDB-S
Radio channel	Yes	No	
High-definition channel	No	Yes (HD only)	Yes
Video	MPEG-2	H.264/MPEG-4 AVC	MPEG-2
Audio	MPEG-1 Audio Layer II	MPEG-4 AAC	MPEG-2 AAC
Encryption	multi2	multi2	B-CAS
Copy control	Yes (Copy once)		
Channel	100 SD channels	162 HD channels (3 4K channels)	34 SD (35 HD channels)
Satellite	JCSAT-3A and JCSAT-4A		N-SAT-110, B-SAT3a, B-SAT3b and B-SAT3c
Launched	September 30, 1996	October 10, 2008	January 1, 2002

== See also ==
- Wowow – Japanese satellite TV company and station
