= 2006 in Jungle Fight =

Information
- First date: April 29, 2006
- Last date: December 17, 2006

Events
- Total events: 2

Fights
- Total fights: 16

Chronology
2005 in Jungle Fight	2006 in Jungle Fight	2008 in Jungle Fight

The year 2006 is the fourth year in the history of Jungle Fight, a mixed martial arts promotion based in Brazil. In 2006 Jungle Fight held 2 events beginning with, Jungle Fight 6.

== Events list ==
#	Event title	Date	Arena	Location
7	Jungle Fight Europe	December 17, 2006	Dvorana Tivoli	Ljubljana, Slovenia
6	Jungle Fight 6	April 29, 2006	Tropical Hotel	Manaus, Brazil

== Jungle Fight 6 ==
Jungle Fight 6 was an event held on April 29, 2006 at The Tropical Hotel in Manaus, Amazonas, Brazil.

=== Results ===
Main Card
Weight class				Method	Round	Time	Notes
	Lyoto Machida	def.	Dimitri Wanderley	TKO (Exhaustion)	3	3:24
	Ronaldo Souza	def.	Alexander Shlemenko	Technical Submission (Arm-Triangle Choke)	1	2:10
	Thales Leites	def.	Jose Landi-Jons	Submission (Arm-Triangle Choke)	1	2:40
	Adriano Martins	def.	Steve Reyna	Submission (Rear-Naked Choke)	2	0:35
	Marcos Galvao	def.	Fredson Paixao	Decision (Unanimous)	3	5:00
	Danillo Villefort	def.	Frodi Vitalis Hansen	Submission (Rear-Naked Choke)	2	0:50
	Tony DeSouza	def.	Vitelmo Kubis Bandeira	Submission (Kneebar)	1	4:38
	Brayan Rafiq	def.	Chinzo Machida	Submission (Guillotine Choke)	2	0:56
	Davina Maciel	def.	Kanako Inaba	KO (Punches)	2	1:00

== Jungle Fight Europe ==
Jungle Fight Europe was an event held on December 17, 2006 at Dvorana Tivoli in Ljubljana, Slovenia.

=== Results ===
Main Card
Weight class				Method	Round	Time	Notes
	Ronaldo Souza	def.	Haim Gozali	Submission (Rear-Naked Choke)	1	1:33
	Assuério Silva	def.	Igor Pokrajac	Decision (Split)	3	5:00
	Antony Rea	def.	Rodrigo Gripp de Sousa	TKO (Punches)	1	0:00
	Danilo Rodaki	def.	Klemen Fister	Submission (Rear Naked Choke)	1	3:43
	Steve Cantwell	def.	Leonardo Pecanha	TKO (Doctor Stoppage)	3	2:32
	Dalibor Anastasov	def.	Richard Montgomery	Submission (Rear Naked Choke)	1	4:16
	Sasa Mucnjak	def.	Martin Boizik	TKO (Punches)	1	2:31
