= Paulo César da Silva =

Paulo César da Silva may refer to:

- Paulo da Silva (born 1980), Paraguayan football player
- Giant Silva, real name Paulo César da Silva (born 1963), former basketball player, mixed martial arts fighter and wrestler
