= Ronaldo Souza =

Brazilian mixed martial arts fighter

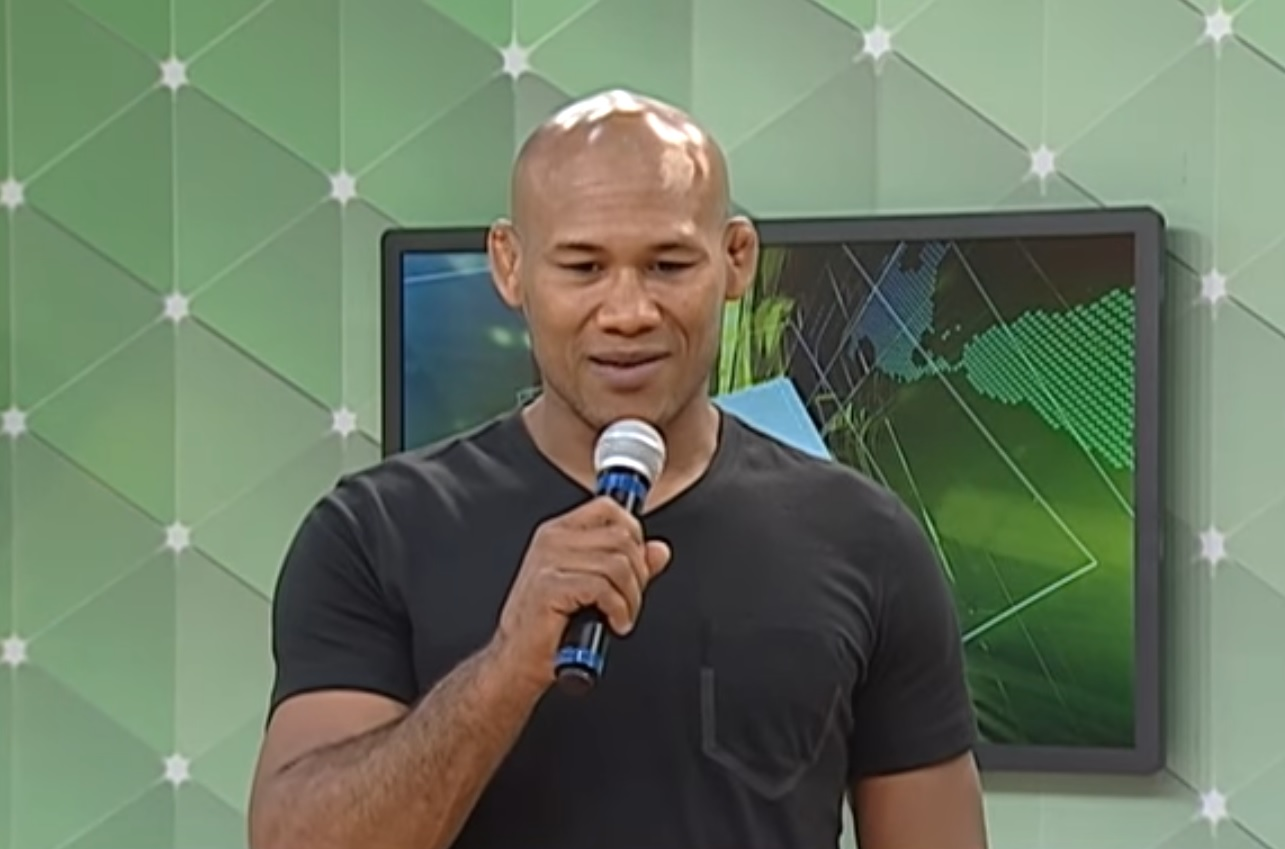
- Born: Ronaldo Souza dos Santos; 7 December 1979 (age 46); Vila Velha, Espírito Santo, Brazil
- Other names: Jacaré
- Height: 6 ft 1 in (185 cm)
- Weight: 185 lb (84 kg; 13 st 3 lb)
- Division: Light Heavyweight (2019); Middleweight (2003–2021)
- Reach: 72 in (183 cm)
- Style: Brazilian Jiu-Jitsu
- Fighting out of: Manaus, Amazonas, Brazil
- Team: Fusion X-Cel Performance
- Rank: 4th degree black belt in Brazilian jiu-jitsu (under Henrique Machado) black belt in Judo (under Henrique Machado)
- Years active: 2003–2021

Mixed martial arts record
- Total: 37
- Wins: 26
- By knockout: 8
- By submission: 14
- By decision: 4
- Losses: 10
- By knockout: 4
- By submission: 1
- By decision: 5
- No contests: 1

Other information
- Mixed martial arts record from Sherdog

Ronaldo Souza dos Santos (born 7 December 1979), nicknamed "Jacaré" (Portuguese pronunciation: [ʒakaˈɾɛ]), is a Brazilian former professional mixed martial artist, submission grappler and 4th degree Brazilian jiu-jitsu black belt.

Souza was a multiple time BJJ World champion in coloured belts before becoming a two-time black belt World Champion, ADCC Submission Fighting World Champion, CBJJO World Cup Champion, Brazilian National Champion and European Open Champion. He was inducted into the ADCC Hall of Fame as part of the 2024 class due to his achievements in the sport.

Souza transitioned to MMA in 2003, competing for UFC from 2013 to 2021. A highly regarded grappler on the world stage, Souza is a former Strikeforce Middleweight Champion, and has also formerly competed for DREAM and Jungle Fight.

== Background ==
Souza was born in Vila Velha, Brazil, into a cafuzo family and was raised in Cariacica, Brazil. Souza had a rough upbringing, and on the day he turned 15, he saw one of his good friends get shot to death. After this event, Souza's mother moved him to Manaus to go and live with his brother and he started training in Judo and Brazilian jiu-jitsu when he was 17. He is an eight-time World Jiu-Jitsu Champion, including gold medals in the Openweight class in 2003, 2004 and 2005. His other credentials include the 2005 77–87 kg ADCC Champion and the 2005 ADCC Absolute Division runner-up, only losing to Roger Gracie who outweighed him by approximately 25 lbs. Along with Roger Gracie and Marcelo Garcia, Souza is widely considered to be among the greatest BJJ practitioners of his time.

== Mixed martial arts career ==
=== Early career ===
Souza made his mixed martial arts debut on 9 September 2003, at Jungle Fight's inaugural event where he lost to Jorge "Macaco" Patino by KO at 3:13 into the first round. He returned to mixed martial arts eight months later at Jungle Fight 2 securing a submission win over Victor Babkir under a minute into the first round. His next fight was in April 2006 at Jungle Fight 6 where he got his second win, defeating Alexander Shlemenko by an arm triangle choke submission. He went on to fight twice before the end of 2006, winning both fights by submission during the first round.

In 2006, Souza fought and drew with UFC Hall of Famer Randy Couture in a grappling contest. After the match Souza was invited by Couture to train at his gym. Souza accepted and started training at Xtreme Couture in Las Vegas. Souza's first fight of 2007 was on 19 May with him scoring a submission win due to strikes over veteran Bill Vucick at Gracie Fighting Championships: Evolution. He would next fight twice within a two-week period on 29 September and 13 October, scoring two submission wins both within the first round.

=== DREAM ===
In 2008, Souza signed with Japanese MMA-promotion DREAM and was scheduled to participate in the 2008 DREAM Middleweight Grand-Prix. In the first round of the tournament, at DREAM 2 on 29 April 2008, he defeated Ian Murphy by a rear-naked choke submission in the first round. This secured him a place in the quarter-finals which took place at DREAM 4 on 15 June where he fought former ICON Sport Middleweight Champion Jason "Mayhem" Miller. The fight went the distance with Souza continuously going for submissions with Miller escaping multiple rear-naked choke, leglock and armbar-attempts while mounting his own offense on the feet. Souza was awarded a unanimous decision victory which secured him a place in the semi-final of the Middleweight Grand-Prix.

In the semi-finals which took place at DREAM 6 on 23 September, Souza defeated Zelg Galesic early in the first round by armbar submission. The victory earned him a place in the finals of the tournament and a shot at the DREAM Middleweight Championship against Gegard Mousasi that same night. In the fight Souza was knocked out early in the first round by an upkick as he attempted to dive past Mousasi's guard to land a strike of his own. After participating in the tournament, Souza left Xtreme Couture and went to San Diego to train with Saulo and Xande Ribeiro, before leaving to train with Anderson Silva and André Galvão in preparation for Silva's upcoming bout with Thales Leites at UFC 97 at Black House.

Souza fought in the DREAM Middleweight Championship in a rematch with Jason Miller at DREAM 9 after Gegard Mousasi vacated the title when moving up to Light Heavyweight. The fight was called a no contest due to an illegal kick to the head that opened up a gash on Souza's head.

=== Strikeforce ===
Souza made his Strikeforce debut on 19 December 2009, at Strikeforce: Evolution with a first-round submission win over Matt Lindland, via arm-triangle choke. In this fight, Souza showed a major improvement in his stand up game and striking. Souza faced Joey Villaseñor on 15 May 2010, at Strikeforce: Heavy Artillery. He won the fight via unanimous decision, dominating the first round, being very aggressive, achieving the mount position and almost achieving the submission, but slowed down on the 2nd and 3rd round.

Souza fought Tim Kennedy on 21 August 2010, at Strikeforce: Houston for the vacant Strikeforce Middleweight Championship, and won via unanimous decision. Souza then defended the belt for the first time against Robbie Lawler, on 29 January 2011, at Strikeforce: Diaz vs. Cyborg.

In his second defense, Souza lost his Middleweight Championship against American Kickboxing Academy fighter Luke Rockhold via unanimous decision (50–45, 48–47, and 48–47).

On 3 March 2012, Souza made his sixth Strikeforce appearance against late replacement Bristol Marunde. Souza won via arm-triangle choke, submitting Marunde at 2:43 of the final round.

On 18 August 2012, Souza faced Derek Brunson in his seventh Strikeforce appearance. Souza dropped Brunson early with a counter right hand which planted Brunson on the mat and landed three ground strikes, knocking out Brunson in just 41 seconds.

Souza faced UFC veteran Ed Herman at the final Strikeforce card, Strikeforce: Marquardt vs. Saffiedine, on 12 January 2013. He won via submission in the first round.

=== Ultimate Fighting Championship ===
==== 2013 ====
Souza signed a five-fight deal with the UFC in January 2013.

Souza was expected to make his promotional debut against Costas Philippou on 18 May 2013, at UFC on FX 8. Philippou pulled out of the bout in early May, citing a cut above his eye, and was replaced by Chris Camozzi. Souza arm-triangle choked Camozzi unconscious in the first round.

Souza next knocked out Yushin Okami in the first round on 4 September 2013, at UFC Fight Night 28.

==== 2014 ====
Souza beat Francis Carmont by unanimous decision (29–28, 29–28, and 30–27) on 15 February 2014, at UFC Fight Night 36. After, he said he was injured during his training camp and would require a minimum of six weeks for recovery.

Souza was expected to rematch Gegard Mousasi on 2 August 2014, at UFC 176. When the event was cancelled, the bout was rescheduled for 5 September 2014, at UFC Fight Night 50. Souza won via submission in the third round, earning his first Performance of the Night bonus award.

==== 2015 ====
Souza was expected to face Yoel Romero on 28 February 2015, at UFC 184. Souza pulled out of the fight on 15 January, due to pneumonia. The bout was rescheduled for 18 April 2015, at UFC on Fox 15. Romero pulled out of the fight a week before the event, citing a ligament and meniscus tear in his knee. Souza instead rematched returning veteran Chris Camozzi, submitting him with a first-round armbar.

The bout with Romero was scheduled for a third time, eventually taking place on 12 December 2015, at UFC 194. Souza lost the bout via split decision. 12 of 17 media outlets scored the bout in favor of Souza, and 3 of 17 scored it a draw.

==== 2016 ====
Souza faced Vitor Belfort on 14 May 2016, at UFC 198. He won the fight via TKO in the first round and was awarded a Performance of the Night bonus.

Souza was expected to face Luke Rockhold in a rematch on 27 November 2016, at UFC Fight Night 101. However, the pairing was cancelled on 1 November 2016, after Rockhold was ruled out of the contest after sustaining an undisclosed injury. As a result, Souza was removed from the card as well.

==== 2017 ====
Souza faced Tim Boetsch on 11 February 2017, at UFC 208. He won the fight via submission in the first round. The win also earned Souza his third Performance of the Night bonus award.

Souza fought Robert Whittaker on 15 April 2017, at UFC on Fox 24. He lost by second-round TKO. During the event weekend, Souza signed a new, eight-fight deal with UFC.

==== 2018 ====
A rematch with Derek Brunson took place on 27 January 2018, in the main event at UFC on Fox 27. Souza won the fight via TKO in the first round. This win earned him the Performance of the Night bonus.

Souza faced Kelvin Gastelum on 12 May 2018, at UFC 224. He lost the fight via split decision. The fight also received Fight of the Night honors.

Souza was expected to face David Branch on 3 November 2018, at UFC 230. However, on 19 October 2018, It was reported that Souza replaced injured Luke Rockhold to face Chris Weidman in the event. He won the fight via knockout in the third round. Both fighters earned Fight of the Night honors.

==== 2019 ====
Souza was scheduled to face Yoel Romero on 27 April 2019, at UFC on ESPN 3. However, it was reported in early April that Romero pulled out of the bout due to illness. Souza remained on the card and faced Jack Hermansson in the main event at UFC Fight Night: Jacaré vs. Hermansson. He lost the fight by unanimous decision.

Souza moved up to the Light Heavyweight division and faced Jan Błachowicz on 16 November 2019, at UFC Fight Night 164. He would lose the fight by split decision.

==== 2020 ====
Souza was scheduled to face Uriah Hall for a middleweight bout on 18 April 2020, at UFC 249. However, on 9 April, Dana White, the president of UFC announced that this event was postponed and the bout and event were rescheduled for 9 May 2020. On 8 May, Souza had to withdraw from the fight after testing positive for COVID-19.

Souza was expected to face Marvin Vettori on 12 December 2020, at UFC 256. However, the bout was scrapped when it was revealed Vettori would be serving as a late replacement to face Jack Hermansson at UFC on ESPN 19 and Souza instead faced Kevin Holland. He lost the fight via knockout in the first round.

==== 2021 ====
Souza faced André Muniz on 15 May 2021, at UFC 262. He lost the fight via technical submission in the first round after his arm snapped while trapped in an armbar. Souza underwent surgery to repair his right humerus. The bout was the last of his prevailing contract, making him a free agent after the organization did not re-sign Souza.

On 10 August 2021, Souza announced that he was retiring from MMA, hinting at a return to BJJ.

== Boxing career ==
Souza was booked to compete in his boxing debut against fellow MMA veteran Vitor Belfort at Gamebred Boxing 4 on 1 April 2023. He lost the fight by unanimous decision with scores of 58–54, 58–54, and 57–55.

== Personal life ==
Souza and his wife, Larissa Carvalho, have three children.

On 8 October 2020, Souza revealed the plans to start his own BJJ Academy in Orlando, Florida. In 2022, he expressed plans for a debut in boxing.

== Championships and accomplishments ==
=== Brazilian jiu-jitsu and submission grappling ===
Main Achievements (Black Belt):

- ADCC Submission Wrestling World Championship:
  - ADCC 2011 Superfight Runner-up (against Braulio Estima)
  - ADCC 2009 Superfight Champion (against Robert Drysdale)
  - ADCC 2005 77 – 87 kg: 1st Place
  - ADCC 2005 Openweight: 2nd Place
  - ADCC 2003 77 – 87 kg: 2nd Place
  - ADCC 2003 Brazilian Qualifiers 77 – 87 kg: 1st Place
- IBJJF World Championship:
  - 2005 Black Belt Medium Heavy: 1st Place
  - 2005 Black Belt Open Weight: 1st Place
  - 2004 Black Belt Medium Heavy: 2nd Place
  - 2004 Black Belt Open Weight: 1st Place
- CBJJO World Cup:
  - 2005 Black belt: 2nd place
  - 2004 Black belt: 1st place
- IBJJF Pan American Championship:
  - 2004 Black Belt Medium Heavy: 1st Place
  - 2004 Black Belt Open Weight: 1st Place
- IBJJF European Open Championship:
  - 2005 Black Belt Medium Heavy: 1st Place
  - 2005 Black Belt Open Weight: 2nd Place

Main Achievements (Colored Belts):

- IBJJF World Championship:
  - 2003 Brown Belt Medium Heavy: 1st Place
  - 2003 Brown Belt Open Weight: 1st Place
  - 2002 Brown Belt Medium Heavy: 1st Place
  - 2002 Brown Belt Open Weight: 2nd Place
  - 2001 Purple Belt Middle: 1st Place
  - 2001 Purple Belt Open Weight: 1st Place
- CBJJ Brazilian National Championship:
  - 2004 Brown Belt Medium Heavy: 1st Place

=== Mixed martial arts ===
- Ultimate Fighting Championship
  - Fight of the Night (Two times) vs. Kelvin Gastelum and Chris Weidman
  - Performance of the Night (Four times) vs. Gegard Mousasi, Vitor Belfort, Tim Boetsch and Derek Brunson
  - Submission of the Night (One time) vs. Chris Camozzi
  - UFC.com Awards
    - 2013: Ranked #3 Import of the Year & Ranked #3 Submission of the Year vs. Chris Camozzi
    - 2018: Ranked #8 Fighter of the Year & Ranked #6 Fight of the Year vs. Chris Weidman
- Strikeforce
  - Strikeforce Middleweight Championship (One time)
  - One successful title defense
- DREAM
  - 2008 DREAM Middleweight Grand Prix Runner-up
- Sherdog
  - 2014 All-Violence Third Team

== Mixed martial arts record ==
Professional record breakdown
37 matches	26 wins	10 losses
By knockout	8	4
By submission	14	1
By decision	4	5
No contests	1	

Res.	Record	Opponent	Method	Event	Date	Round	Time	Location	Notes
Loss	26–10 (1)	André Muniz	Technical Submission (armbar)	UFC 262	15 May 2021	1	3:59	Houston, Texas, United States	
Loss	26–9 (1)	Kevin Holland	KO (punches)	UFC 256	12 December 2020	1	1:45	Las Vegas, Nevada, United States	Return to Middleweight.
Loss	26–8 (1)	Jan Błachowicz	Decision (split)	UFC Fight Night: Błachowicz vs. Jacaré	16 November 2019	5	5:00	São Paulo, Brazil	Light Heavyweight debut.
Loss	26–7 (1)	Jack Hermansson	Decision (unanimous)	UFC Fight Night: Jacaré vs. Hermansson	27 April 2019	5	5:00	Sunrise, Florida, United States	
Win	26–6 (1)	Chris Weidman	KO (punches)	UFC 230	3 November 2018	3	2:46	New York City, New York, United States	Fight of the Night.
Loss	25–6 (1)	Kelvin Gastelum	Decision (split)	UFC 224	12 May 2018	3	5:00	Rio de Janeiro, Brazil	Fight of the Night.
Win	25–5 (1)	Derek Brunson	KO (head kick and punches)	UFC on Fox: Jacaré vs. Brunson 2	27 January 2018	1	3:50	Charlotte, North Carolina, United States	Performance of the Night.
Loss	24–5 (1)	Robert Whittaker	TKO (head kick and punches)	UFC on Fox: Johnson vs. Reis	15 April 2017	2	3:28	Kansas City, Missouri, United States	
Win	24–4 (1)	Tim Boetsch	Submission (kimura)	UFC 208	11 February 2017	1	3:41	Brooklyn, New York, United States	Performance of the Night.
Win	23–4 (1)	Vitor Belfort	TKO (punches)	UFC 198	14 May 2016	1	4:38	Curitiba, Brazil	Performance of the Night.
Loss	22–4 (1)	Yoel Romero	Decision (split)	UFC 194	12 December 2015	3	5:00	Las Vegas, Nevada, United States	
Win	22–3 (1)	Chris Camozzi	Submission (armbar)	UFC on Fox: Machida vs. Rockhold	18 April 2015	1	2:33	Newark, New Jersey, United States	
Win	21–3 (1)	Gegard Mousasi	Submission (guillotine choke)	UFC Fight Night: Jacaré vs. Mousasi	5 September 2014	3	4:30	Mashantucket, Connecticut, United States	Performance of the Night.
Win	20–3 (1)	Francis Carmont	Decision (unanimous)	UFC Fight Night: Machida vs. Mousasi	15 February 2014	3	5:00	Jaraguá do Sul, Brazil	
Win	19–3 (1)	Yushin Okami	TKO (punches)	UFC Fight Night: Teixeira vs. Bader	4 September 2013	1	2:47	Belo Horizonte, Brazil	
Win	18–3 (1)	Chris Camozzi	Technical Submission (arm-triangle choke)	UFC on FX: Belfort vs. Rockhold	18 May 2013	1	3:37	Jaraguá do Sul, Brazil	Submission of the Night.
Win	17–3 (1)	Ed Herman	Submission (kimura)	Strikeforce: Marquardt vs. Saffiedine	12 January 2013	1	3:10	Oklahoma City, Oklahoma, United States	Catchweight (194 lb) bout.
Win	16–3 (1)	Derek Brunson	KO (punches)	Strikeforce: Rousey vs. Kaufman	18 August 2012	1	0:41	San Diego, California, United States	
Win	15–3 (1)	Bristol Marunde	Submission (arm-triangle choke)	Strikeforce: Tate vs. Rousey	3 March 2012	3	2:43	Columbus, Ohio, United States	
Loss	14–3 (1)	Luke Rockhold	Decision (unanimous)	Strikeforce: Barnett vs. Kharitonov	10 September 2011	5	5:00	Cincinnati, Ohio, United States	Lost the Strikeforce Middleweight Championship.
Win	14–2 (1)	Robbie Lawler	Submission (rear-naked choke)	Strikeforce: Diaz vs. Cyborg	29 January 2011	3	2:00	San Jose, California, United States	Defended the Strikeforce Middleweight Championship.
Win	13–2 (1)	Tim Kennedy	Decision (unanimous)	Strikeforce: Houston	21 August 2010	5	5:00	Houston, Texas, United States	Won the vacant Strikeforce Middleweight Championship.
Win	12–2 (1)	Joey Villaseñor	Decision (unanimous)	Strikeforce: Heavy Artillery	15 May 2010	3	5:00	St. Louis, Missouri, United States	
Win	11–2 (1)	Matt Lindland	Submission (arm-triangle choke)	Strikeforce: Evolution	19 December 2009	1	4:18	San Jose, California, United States	
NC	10–2 (1)	Jason Miller	NC (cut)	DREAM 9	26 May 2009	1	2:33	Yokohama, Japan	For the vacant DREAM Middleweight Championship.
Loss	10–2	Gegard Mousasi	KO (upkick)	Dream 6: Middleweight Grand Prix 2008 Final Round	23 September 2008	1	2:15	Saitama, Japan	For the vacant DREAM Middleweight Championship.
Win	10–1	Zelg Galešić	Submission (armbar)	Dream 6: Middleweight Grand Prix 2008 Final Round	23 September 2008	1	1:27	Saitama, Japan	
Win	9–1	Jason Miller	Decision (unanimous)	Dream 4: Middleweight Grand Prix 2008 Second Round	15 June 2008	2	5:00	Yokohama, Japan	
Win	8–1	Ian Murphy	Submission (rear-naked choke)	Dream 2: Middleweight Grand Prix 2008 First Round	29 April 2008	1	3:37	Saitama, Japan	
Win	7–1	Wendell Santos	TKO (submission to punches)	Hero's The Jungle	13 October 2007	1	1:40	Manaus, Brazil	
Win	6–1	José de Ribamar	Submission (armbar)	Amazon Challenge	29 September 2007	1	3:28	Manaus, Brazil	
Win	5–1	Bill Vucick	TKO (submission to punches)	Gracie Fighting Championships: Evolution	19 May 2007	1	3:01	Columbus, Ohio, United States	
Win	4–1	Haim Gozali	Submission (rear-naked choke)	Jungle Fight Europe	17 December 2006	1	1:34	Ljubljana, Slovenia	
Win	3–1	Alexey Prokofiev	Submission (triangle choke)	Fury Fighting Championship 1	27 September 2006	1	2:30	São Paulo, Brazil	
Win	2–1	Alexander Shlemenko	Technical Submission (arm-triangle choke)	Jungle Fight 6	29 April 2006	1	2:10	Manaus, Brazil	
Win	1–1	Victor Babkir	TKO (submission to punches)	Jungle Fight 2	15 May 2004	1	0:56	Manaus, Brazil	
Loss	0–1	Jorge Patino	KO (punch)	Jungle Fight 1	13 September 2003	1	3:13	Manaus, Brazil	

== Boxing record ==
1 fight	0 wins	1 loss
By decision	0	1

No.	Result	Record	Opponent	Type	Round, time	Date	Location	Notes
1	Loss	0–1	Vitor Belfort	UD	6	1 Apr 2023	Fiserv Forum, Milwaukee, Wisconsin, U.S.	

== See also ==
- List of Brazilian Jiu-Jitsu practitioners
- List of male mixed martial artists
- List of multi-sport athletes
- List of multi-sport champions

Vacant Title last held by Jake Shields	4th Strikeforce Middleweight Champion; 21 August 2010 – 10 September 2011	Succeeded by Luke Rockhold
