= Fábio Mello =

Mixed martial artist

- Born: June 28, 1975 (age 51); Brazil
- Height: 5 ft 6 in (1.68 m)
- Weight: 145 lb (66 kg; 10.4 st)
- Division: Featherweight (145 lb); Bantamweight (135 lb); Lightweight (155 lb)
- Reach: 63 in (160 cm)
- Style: MMA, Brazilian jiu-jitsu, Shooto
- Fighting out of: Coconut Creek, Florida, United States
- Team: Jaco Hybrid Training Center (Blackzilians)
- Rank: Black belt in Brazilian Jiu-Jitsu
- Years active: 2001–present

Mixed martial arts record
- Total: 18
- Wins: 11
- By knockout: 2
- By submission: 5
- By decision: 4
- Losses: 7
- By knockout: 2
- By decision: 5

Other information
- Mixed martial arts record from Sherdog

Fábio Mello (born June 28, 1975) is a Brazilian mixed martial artist who fought on Pride Fighting Championships, DEEP, Shooto, Bellator Fighting Championships, Jungle Fight and Titan Fighting Championships. He is currently the no gi and brazilian jiu-jitsu trainer of Imperial Athletics.

== Mixed martial arts career ==
=== Japanese and Brazilian promotions ===
Mello started his career in 2001. Between 2001 and 2008, he fought only for Japanese and Brazilian promotions like Pride Fighting Championships, DEEP, Jungle Fight and Meca World Vale Tudo. He compiled a record of four wins and six losses, facing opponents like Takanori Gomi, José Aldo and Fredson Paixão.

=== Bellator Fighting Championships ===
Mello faced Sami Aziz on June 19, 2009, at Bellator 12. He defeated Aziz via submission due to an armbar in the third round.

On November 19, 2011, at Bellator 58, Mello faced Farkhad Sharipov. He won via unanimous decision after three rounds (30-27, 30–27, 30–27).

=== Titan Fighting Championships ===
Mello faced Josh Huber on March 2, 2012, at Titan Fighting Championships 21. He defeated Huber via submission in the first round.

Mello was expected to face Nick Mamalis on May 25, 2012, at Titan Fighting Championships 22. But for undisclosed reasons, Mamalis was replaced by Angelo Duarte. Once again Mello won via submission in the first round.

=== World Series of Fighting ===
Mello was expected to face Waylon Lowe on November 3, 2012, at WSOF 1. However, the fight was scrapped due to Mello getting injured.

Mello made his debut against Nick LoBosco on October 26, 2013, at WSOF 6. He lost via knockout in the first round.

== Mixed martial arts record ==
Professional record breakdown
19 matches	11 wins	8 losses
By knockout	2	3
By submission	5	0
By decision	4	5

Res.	Record	Opponent	Method	Event	Date	Round	Time	Location	Notes
Loss	11–8	J.J. Ambrose	TKO (punches)	Gladiators Fighting Championship 9	May 27, 2016	2	3:48	Mishref, Kuwait	
Loss	11–7	Nick LoBosco	KO (head kick and punches)	WSOF 6	October 26, 2013	1	2:02	Coral Gables, Florida, United States	
Win	11–6	Angelo Duarte	Submission (arm-triangle choke)	Titan Fighting Championships 22	May 25, 2012	1	4:34	Kansas City, Kansas, United States	Featherweight bout.
Win	10–6	Josh Huber	Submission (arm-triangle choke)	Titan Fighting Championships 21	March 2, 2012	1	3:26	Kansas City, Kansas, United States	
Win	9–6	Farkhad Sharipov	Decision (unanimous)	Bellator 58	November 19, 2011	3	5:00	Hollywood, Florida, United States	Moves down to bantamweight.
Win	8–6	Charles Bennett	Decision (split)	World Extreme Fighting 45	January 22, 2011	3	5:00	Jacksonville, Florida, United States	
Win	7–6	George Castaneda	Submission (arm-triangle choke)	Maximo Fighting Championship	October 17, 2009	1	2:24	San Juan, Puerto Rico	
Win	6–6	Sami Aziz	Submission (armbar)	Bellator 12	June 19, 2009	3	1:58	Hollywood, Florida, United States	
Win	5–6	Anthony Morrison	Submission (guillotine choke)	AOF 1: Rumble at Robarts	January 24, 2009	1	2:17	Sarasota, Florida, United States	
Loss	4–6	Jorge Clay	Decision (unanimous)	Hero's The Jungle 2	April 7, 2008	3	5:00	Manaus, Amazonas, Brazil	
Loss	4–5	José Aldo	Decision (unanimous)	Top Fighting Championships 3	May 2, 2007	3	5:00	Rio de Janeiro, Brazil	
Loss	4–4	Masakazu Imanari	Decision (unanimous)	Deep: 21st Impact	October 28, 2005	3	5:00	Tokyo, Japan	
Win	4–3	Vinicius Magalhães	TKO (punches)	Storm Samurai 8	July 2, 2005	2	N/A	Brasília, Brazil	
Loss	3–3	Fredson Paixão	Decision (unanimous)	Jungle Fight 3	October 23, 2004	3	5:00	Manaus, Amazonas, Brazil	
Loss	3–2	Takanori Gomi	TKO (punches)	Pride Bushido 4	July 19, 2004	1	8:07	Nagoya, Aichi, Japan	
Win	3–1	Luciano Azevedo	Decision (unanimous)	Shooto Brazil: Welcome to Hell	November 23, 2003	2	5:00	Niterói, Rio de Janeiro, Brazil	
Loss	2–1	Dokonjonosuke Mishima	Decision (unanimous)	Deep: 8th Impact	March 4, 2003	3	5:00	Tokyo, Japan	
Win	2–0	Takumi Yano	Decision (unanimous)	Deep: 6th Impact	September 7, 2002	3	5:00	Tokyo, Japan	
Win	1–0	Aritano Silva Barbosa	TKO (punches)	Meca World Vale Tudo 5	June 9, 2001	1	8:27	Curitiba, Paraná, Brazil	
