= Jorge Patino =

Brazilian mixed martial arts fighter

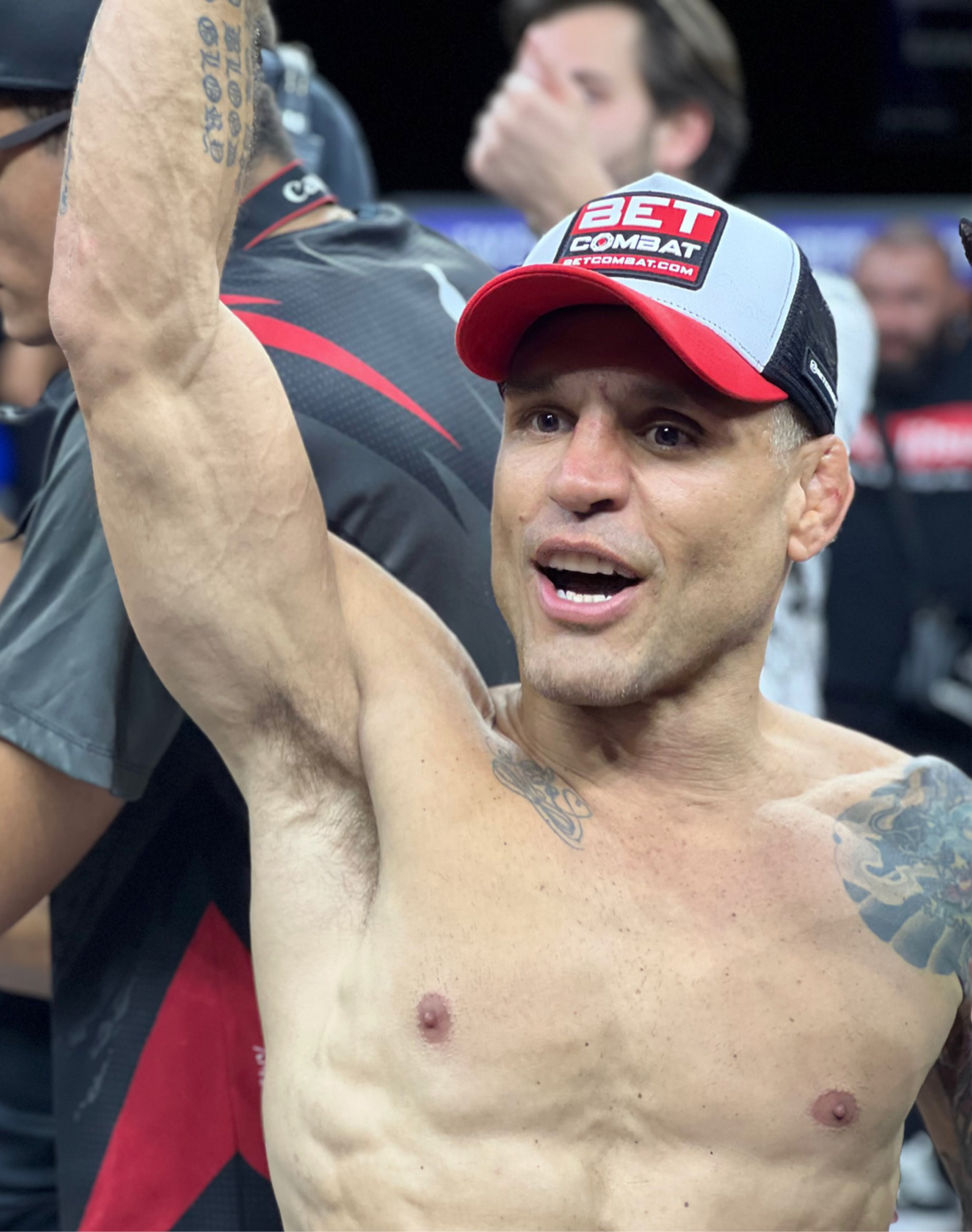
- Patino in 2023
- Born: Jorge Luis Patino; May 8, 1973 (age 53); São Paulo, Brazil
- Other names: Macaco
- Height: 5 ft 8 in (1.73 m)
- Weight: 155 lb (70 kg; 11.1 st)
- Division: Lightweight; Welterweight; Middleweight
- Fighting out of: São Paulo, Brazil
- Team: Chute Boxe Academy (1996–2007); Gold Team Fighters USA (2010–present); Gold Team Fighters Houston (2008–present); Macaco Gold Team (2001–present)
- Rank: 5th degree black belt in Brazilian Jiu-Jitsu; 2nd dan black belt in Judo
- Years active: 1995–present

Mixed martial arts record
- Total: 62
- Wins: 39
- By knockout: 18
- By submission: 9
- By decision: 9
- Unknown: 3
- Losses: 19
- By knockout: 6
- By submission: 2
- By decision: 11
- Draws: 2
- No contests: 2

Other information
- Website: http://www.goldteamfightersusa.com/ http://www.goldteamtx.com/
- Mixed martial arts record from Sherdog
- Last updated on: August 22, 2010

Jorge Patino
Medal record

Representing Brazil

Pan American Championship
Gold medal – first place	2001 California, USA	-88kg
Gold medal – first place	2000 California, USA	-88kg
Silver medal – second place	1997 California, USA	-88kg

Brazilian National Championship
Bronze medal – third place	2000 Rio de Janeiro, Brazil	-88kg

Jorge Luis Patino (born May 8, 1973) is a Brazilian professional mixed martial artist currently competing in the Lightweight division. A professional competitor since 1995, Patino has formerly competed in the UFC, PRIDE, Strikeforce, Legacy FC, Jungle Fight, Pancrase, World Series of Fighting, Cage Rage, and Titan FC.

Patino is the BJJ coach of Charles Oliveira and was responsible for awarding Oliveira his black belt.

== Background ==
Originally from São Paulo, Brazil, Patino played rugby and also trained in judo before being introduced to Brazilian jiu-jitsu in 1992, later earning his black belt in 1998. Energetic and hyperactive as a child, Patino earned the nickname Macaco (meaning monkey in Portuguese) because of his love for climbing trees.

== Mixed martial arts career ==
=== Early career ===
Patino started to compete in vale tudo fights in the year 1995, defeating three opponents in the Circuito de Lutas 1 independent event. Macaco went on a winning track, defeating many opponents, until he was knocked out by João Bosco in Torneio dos Gladiadores 2, his second opponent in the night. Afterwards, Jorge went on to fight in the BVF 6: Campeonato Brasileiro de Vale Tudo 1 event, where he defeated Anderson Lima by knockout, Erico Correia by submissions due to strikes, and then faced José Landi-Jons, also known as Pelé, in a historic battle. After nearly 15 minutes of fighting, Pelé defeated Macaco, making him submit to strikes. The two then had a rematch, which was again won by Landi-Jons. Patino is managed by Wade Hampel of Big Fight Management.

=== Fighting abroad ===
Macaco was then signed to the UFC, where he faced the Welterweight Champion Pat Miletich at UFC 18: The Road to the Heavyweight Title. The champion successfully defended his title, defeating Patino by unanimous decision. Macaco then went on to fight in Japan for the DEEP promotion, drawing a match with Daisuke Ishii. His next two fights happened in Brazil, for the Meca World Vale Tudo promotion, where he faced Gustavo "Ximú" Machado. Jorge had cut his foot while playing soccer, and had to go to the fight still in stitches and bandages. Ximú capitalized on the opportunity, and defeated Patino with a heelhook, later granting a rematch to his opponent. Afterwards, in Meca World Vale Tudo 8, Luiz Cláudio das Dores faced Macaco, but the fight was set as a No Contest due to a bad call by the referee. In 2003, for the first Jungle Fight event, Macaco faced Ronaldo Souza, better known as Jacaré. Patino knocked out Ronaldo in the first round of the fight, which was Jacaré's mixed martial arts debut.

Afterwards, Macaco then returned to Meca, defeating Luiz Brito at Meca World Vale Tudo 10 by a split decision. Afterwards, he fought for the Japanese promotion Pride FC, in its Pride Bushido 3 event, where he faced Kazuo Misaki. Misaki won by unanimous decision, and this was the end of Jorge Patino's stint with PRIDE.

After Nate Moore had to withdraw from his fight against Brazilian Jiu Jitsu world champion André Galvão in Strikeforce, Patino took the fight in short notice for the Strikeforce: Houston event. However, he was defeated in the third round due to strikes.

=== Legacy Fighting Championship ===
In his debut with Legacy FC, Patino defeated Pete Spratt via split decision on September 16, 2011 to win the Welterweight Championship at Legacy FC 8.

On December 16, 2011, he fought Mike Bronzoulis and won by unanimous decision (49–46, 49–46, and 49–46), to defend his title in the main event at Legacy FC 9.

On May 11, 2012, Patino dropped to the Lightweight division in order to face Jesus Rivera in the main event of Legacy FC 11, to fight for the vacant Lightweight Championship. However the day before the fight was scheduled to take place, Rivera backed out of the fight and newcomer Clay Hantz took the fight on short notice. He won the fight via knockout in the first round. Patino successfully defended the title one time before losing it to Carlos Diego Ferreira in November 2013.

=== World Series of Fighting ===
In early 2014, Patino joined the World Series of Fighting organization. He faced Luis Palomino in his debut WSOF 8 and lost via knockout.

In November 2015, Patino was one of participants of WSOF's one night Lightweight tournament. He faced Islam Mamedov in the quarterfinals and lost via unanimous decision. Mamedov, however, was injured and Patino replaced him in the semifinals against Joáo Zeferino. He lost that fight by submission in the first round.

== Personal life ==
Jorge is married.

== Championships and accomplishments ==
- Legacy Fighting Championship
  - Legacy FC Lightweight Championship (One time, current)
  - One successful title defense
  - Legacy FC Welterweight Championship (One time)
  - One successful title defense
- Predator Fighting Championship
  - Predator FC Lightweight Championship (One time)
- Max Sport
  - Max Sport Lightweight Championship (One Time)
- Fight Masters Combat
  - FMC Lightweight Championship (One Time)
- Real Fight
  - Real Fight Lightweight Championship (One Time)
- Thunder Fight
  - Thunder Fight Lightweight Championship (One Time)

== Mixed martial arts record ==
Professional record breakdown
62 matches	39 wins	19 losses
By knockout	18	6
By submission	9	2
By decision	9	11
Unknown	3	0
Draws	2	
No contests	2	

Res.	Record	Opponent	Method	Event	Date	Round	Time	Location	Notes
Win	39–19–2 (2)	Sergio Soares	TKO (retirement)	Thunder Fight 43	April 14, 2023	3	5:00	São Paulo, Brazil	Legends Bout.
NC	38–19–2 (2)	Yousef Wehbe	NC (overturned)	Battlefield: The Great Beginning	March 18, 2017	1	4:50	Seoul, South Korea	Welterweight bout. Originally a win by Patino, the result of this fight was later changed to a No Contest due to referee error.
Loss	38–19–2 (1)	Sabah Homasi	KO (punch)	Titan FC 40	August 5, 2016	2	1:18	Coral Gables, Florida	
Loss	38–18–2 (1)	Alexander Sarnavskiy	Decision (unanimous)	Abu Dhabi Warriors 4	May 24, 2016	3	5:00	Abu Dhabi, United Arab Emirates	
Loss	38–17–2 (1)	João Zeferino	Submission (heel hook)	WSOF 25	November 20, 2015	1	1:24	Phoenix, Arizona, United States	WSOF Lightweight Tournament Semifinal.
Loss	38–16–2 (1)	Islam Mamedov	Decision (unanimous)	WSOF 25	November 20, 2015	2	5:00	Phoenix, Arizona, United States	WSOF Lightweight Tournament Quarterfinal.
Win	38–15–2 (1)	Celso Vinicius	Decision (unanimous)	Thunder Fight 4	June 20, 2015	5	5:00	São Paulo, Brazil	Won the Thunder Fight Lightweight Championship.
Win	37–15–2 (1)	Sérgio Soares	KO (punches)	Real Fight 12	December 13, 2014	4	4:05	São Paulo, Brazil	Won the Real Fight Lightweight Championship.
Win	36–15–2 (1)	Eric Reynolds	Decision (unanimous)	WSOF 15	November 15, 2014	3	5:00	Tampa, Florida, United States	
Loss	35–15–2 (1)	Luis Palomino	KO (punches)	WSOF 8	January 18, 2014	2	4:20	Hollywood, Florida, United States	
Win	35–14–2 (1)	Wagner Campos	TKO (punches)	FMC 1: Macaco Galeto	December 7, 2013	3	2:32	São Paulo, Brazil	Won the FMC Lightweight Championship.
Loss	34–14–2 (1)	Carlos Diego Ferreira	Decision (unanimous)	Legacy FC 25	November 15, 2013	5	5:00	Houston, Texas, United States	Lost the Legacy FC Lightweight Championship.
Win	34–13–2 (1)	Efraín Escudero	Decision (split)	Max Sport: 13.2	May 11, 2013	3	5:00	São Paulo, Brazil	Won the Max Sport Lightweight Championship.
Draw	33–13–2 (1)	Isao Kobayashi	Draw	Pancrase 246	March 17, 2013	3	5:00	Tokyo, Japan	
Win	33–13–1 (1)	Derrick Krantz	Submission (triangle guillotine choke)	Legacy FC 18	March 1, 2013	2	3:07	Houston, Texas, United States	Defended the Legacy FC Lightweight Championship.
Win	32–13–1 (1)	Gérson Cordeiro	Submission (rear-naked choke)	Predador FC 22	October 20, 2012	1	N/A	São Paulo, Brazil	Won the Vacant Predator FC Lightweight Championship.
Win	31–13–1 (1)	Clay Hantz	KO (punches)	Legacy FC 11	May 11, 2012	1	1:04	Houston, Texas, United States	Won the Legacy FC Lightweight Championship.
Win	30–13–1 (1)	Mike Bronzoulis	Decision (unanimous)	Legacy FC 9	December 16, 2011	5	5:00	Houston, Texas, United States	Defended the Legacy FC Welterweight Championship.
Win	29–13–1 (1)	Pete Spratt	Decision (split)	Legacy FC 8	September 16, 2011	5	5:00	Houston, Texas, United States	Won the Legacy FC Welterweight Championship.
Win	28–13–1 (1)	Cleburn Walker	Submission (neck crank)	Quality Entertainment	April 9, 2011	1	3:57	Austin, Texas, United States	
Loss	27–13–1 (1)	André Galvão	TKO (punches)	Strikeforce: Houston	August 21, 2010	3	2:45	Houston, Texas, United States	
Loss	27–12–1 (1)	Roan Carneiro	Decision (unanimous)	Shine Fights 2: ATT vs. The World	September 4, 2009	3	5:00	Miami, Florida, United States	
Win	27–11–1 (1)	Beau Baker	Decision (unanimous)	KAP: The Return of Macaco	February 7, 2009	3	5:00	Newark, New Jersey, United States	
Loss	26–11–1 (1)	Kyacey Uscola	Decision (unanimous)	PFP: Ring of Fire	December 9, 2007	3	5:00	Manila, Philippines	
Win	26–10–1 (1)	Gustavo Machado	Decision (split)	Predador FC 6: Octagon	August 25, 2007	3	5:00	São Paulo, Brazil	
Loss	25–10–1 (1)	Luis Santos	Decision (unanimous)	Midway Fight	May 10, 2007	3	5:00	São Paulo, Brazil	
Loss	25–9–1 (1)	Fernando Pontes	Decision (unanimous)	Showfight 5	November 9, 2006	3	5:00	São Paulo, Brazil	
Win	25–8–1 (1)	Roberto Godoi	TKO (punches)	Super Challenge 1	October 7, 2006	2	5:00	Barueri, Brazil	
Win	24–8–1 (1)	Curtis Stout	Decision (unanimous)	Cage Rage 16	April 22, 2006	3	5:00	London, England	
Loss	23–8–1 (1)	Eduardo Pamplona	Decision (unanimous)	Showfight 4	April 6, 2006	3	5:00	São Paulo, Brazil	
Win	23–7–1 (1)	Gabriel Vella	KO (punches)	Showfight 3	October 21, 2005	1	1:40	São Paulo, Brazil	
Win	22–7–1 (1)	Carlos Baruch	TKO (punches)	Jungle Fight 4	May 21, 2005	2	3:57	Manaus, Brazil	
Win	21–7–1 (1)	Boris Jonstomp	Submission (arm-triangle choke)	Jungle Fight 3	October 23, 2004	2	N/A	Manaus, Brazil	
Loss	20–7–1 (1)	Delson Heleno	Decision (unanimous)	Meca World Vale Tudo 11	June 5, 2004	3	5:00	Teresópolis, Brazil	
Loss	20–6–1 (1)	Kazuo Misaki	Decision (unanimous)	Pride Bushido 3	May 25, 2004	2	5:00	Yokohama, Japan	
Win	20–5–1 (1)	Luis Brito	Decision (split)	Meca World Vale Tudo 10	December 20, 2003	3	5:00	Curitiba, Brazil	
Win	19–5–1 (1)	Ronaldo Souza	KO (punch)	Jungle Fight 1	September 13, 2003	1	3:13	Manaus, Brazil	
NC	18–5–1 (1)	Luiz Claudio das Dores	NC (premature stoppage)	Meca World Vale Tudo 8	May 16, 2003	1	4:36	Curitiba, Brazil	
Loss	18–5–1	Gustavo Machado	Submission (heel hook)	Meca World Vale Tudo 6 - BTT vs. PAP	January 31, 2002	1	2:00	Curitiba, Brazil	
Draw	18–4–1	Daisuke Ishii	Draw	Deep: 1st Impact	January 8, 2001	3	5:00	Nagoya, Japan	
Loss	18–4	Pat Miletich	Decision (unanimous)	UFC 18	January 8, 1999	1	21:00	New Orleans, Louisiana, United States	For the UFC Welterweight Championship.
Loss	18–3	José Landi-Jons	TKO (doctor stoppage)	World Vale Tudo Championship 4	March 16, 1997	1	9:37	Brazil	
Loss	18–2	José Landi-Jons	TKO (submission to punches)	BVF 6: Campeonato Brasileiro de Vale Tudo 1	November 1, 1996	1	14:19	Brazil	
Win	18–1	Erico Correia	Submission (armbar)	BVF 6: Campeonato Brasileiro de Vale Tudo 1	November 1, 1996	1	0:47	Brazil	
Win	17–1	Anderson Lima	KO (punches)	BVF 6: Campeonato Brasileiro de Vale Tudo 1	November 1, 1996	1	0:50	Brazil	
Loss	16–1	João Bosco	KO (punches)	Torneio dos Gladiadores 2	August 16, 1996	1	0:33	Brazil	
Win	16–0	Carlos Arantes	TKO (punches)	Tournament of Gladiators 2	August 16, 1996	1	1:20	Brazil	
Win	15–0	João João	TKO (punches)	Tournament of Gladiators 2	August 16, 1996	1	0:17	Brazil	
Win	14–0	Claudio Neves	Submission (rear-naked choke)	Tournament of Gladiators 1	June 24, 1996	1	3:50	São Paulo, Brazil	
Win	13–0	Antônio Pedra	Submission (americana)	Tournament of Gladiators 1	June 24, 1996	1	2:19	São Paulo, Brazil	
Win	12–0	Reinaldo Chagas	TKO (elbows)	Tournament of Gladiators 1	June 24, 1996	1	0:59	São Paulo, Brazil	
Win	11–0	Pedro Leão	TKO (doctor stoppage)	Free Stile de Natal: Natal Freestyle 1	May 10, 1996	1	6:14	Rio Grande Do Norte, Brazil	
Win	10–0	Kiko Boxe	TKO (punches)	Free Stile de Natal: Natal Freestyle 1	May 10, 1996	1	0:48	Rio Grande Do Norte, Brazil	
Win	9–0	Sílvio Karate	Submission (guillotine choke)	Free Stile de Natal: Natal Freestyle 1	May 10, 1996	1	0:29	Rio Grande Do Norte, Brazil	
Win	8–0	Ivo dos Reis	TKO (submission to punches)	Circuito de Lutas 3	September 12, 1995	1	1:01	São Paulo, Brazil	
Win	7–0	Guaracy Pereira	TKO (submission to punches)	Circuito de Lutas 3	September 12, 1995	1	1:07	São Paulo, Brazil	
Win	6–0	Claudionor Cardoso da Silva	Submission (triangle choke)	Circuito de Lutas 2	July 5, 1995	1	3:06	São Paulo, Brazil	
Win	5–0	José de Campos	Submission (rear-naked choke)	Circuito de Lutas 2	July 5, 1995	1	0:57	São Paulo, Brazil	
Win	4–0	Paulo de Jesus	TKO (submission to punches)	Circuito de Lutas 2	July 5, 1995	1	0:27	São Paulo, Brazil	
Win	3–0	Claudionor Cardoso da Silva	Submission (armbar)	Circuito de Lutas 1	April 1, 1995	1	0:28	São Paulo, Brazil	
Win	2–0	Ricardo Antiorio	TKO (submission to punches)	Circuito de Lutas 1	April 1, 1995	1	0:27	São Paulo, Brazil	
Win	1–0	Dulcino Silva	Submission (rear-naked choke)	Circuito de Lutas 1	April 1, 1995	1	0:16	São Paulo, Brazil	

== See also ==
- Vale Tudo
- Brazilian Jiu Jitsu
- List of male mixed martial artists
