= 2004 in Jungle Fight =

Information
- First date: May 15, 2004
- Last date: October 23, 2004

Events
- Total events: 2

Fights
- Title fights: 19

Chronology
2003 in Jungle Fight	2004 in Jungle Fight	2005 in Jungle Fight

The year 2004 is the second year in the history of Jungle Fight, a mixed martial arts promotion based in Brazil. In 2004 Jungle Fight held 2 events beginning with, Jungle Fight 2.

== Events list ==
#	Event Title	Date	Arena	Location
3	Jungle Fight 3	October 23, 2004	Tropical Hotel	Manaus, Brazil
2	Jungle Fight 2	May 15, 2004	Studio 5 Festival Mall Manaus	Manaus, Brazil

== Jungle Fight 2 ==
Jungle Fight 2 was an event held on May 15, 2004 at The Tropical Hotel in Manaus, Amazonas, Brazil.

=== Results ===
Main Card
Weight class				Method	Round	Time	Notes
	Travis Wiuff	def.	Leopoldo Montenegro	KO (Slam and Punches)	1	4:33
	Assuério Silva	def.	Fabiano Scherner	Submission (Guillotine Choke)	2	N/A
	Ronaldo Souza	def.	Victor Babkir	TKO (Submission to punches)	1	0:56
	Carlos Barreto	def.	Bobby Hoffman	TKO (Submission to punches)	2	N/A
	Katsuyori Shibata	def.	Webster Dauphiney	Submission (Arm-Triangle Choke)	1	0:52
	Fabrício Werdum	def.	Ebenezer Fontes Braga	KO (Punch)	2	1:28
	Daniel Acacio	def.	Buck Greer	KO (Punch)	2	N/A
	Boris Jonstomp	def.	Adriano Martins	Decision	3	5:00
	Fredson Paixao	def.	Rani Yahya	Decision	3	5:00
	Gabriel Gonzaga	def.	Charlie Brown	TKO (Exhaustion)	3	N/A

== Jungle Fight 3 ==
Jungle Fight 3 was an event held on October 23, 2004 at The Tropical Hotel in Manaus, Amazonas, Brazil.

=== Results ===
Main Card
Weight class				Method	Round	Time	Notes
	Renato Sobral	def.	Jose Landi	Decision (Unanimous)	3	5:00
	Assuério Silva	def.	Alessio Sakara	Decision (Unanimous)	3	5:00
	Jorge Patino	def.	Boris Jonstomp	Submission (Arm-Triangle Choke)	2	0:00
	Masayuki Naruse	def.	Tommy Williams	Submission (Armbar)	1	0:00
	Leopoldo Montenegro	def.	Bobby Hoffman	Submission (Triangle Choke)	1	0:00
	Tony DeSouza	def.	Carlos Lima	Submission (Arm-Triangle Choke)	2	0:00
	Bibiano Fernandes	def.	Luis Figueroa	Submission (Rear-Naked Choke)	1	0:31
	Masahito Kakihara	def.	Rocky Romero	Submission (Kneebar)	1	0:00
	Fredson Paixao	def.	Fabio Mello	Decision (Unanimous)	3	5:00
