= 2003 in Jungle Fight =

Information
- First date: September 13, 2003
- Last date: September 13, 2003

Events
- Total events: 1

Fights
- Total fights: 12

Chronology
2003 in Jungle Fight	2004 in Jungle Fight

The year 2003 is the first year in the history of Jungle Fight, a mixed martial arts promotion based in Brazil. In 2003 Jungle Fight held 1 event, Jungle Fight 1.

== Events list ==
#	Event title	Date	Arena	Location
1	Jungle Fight 1	September 13, 2003	Ariaú Amazon Towers	Manaus, Brazil

== Jungle Fight 1 ==
Jungle Fight 1 was an event held on September 13, 2003 at Ariau Amazon Towers Convention Center, Elephant & Castle in Manaus, Amazonas, Brazil.

=== Results ===
Main Card
Weight class				Method	Round	Time	Notes
	Jorge Patino	def.	Ronaldo Souza	KO (Punch)	1	3:13
	Evangelista Santos	def.	Lucas Lopes	TKO (Punches and Leg Kick)	2	4:08
	Ricardo Morais	def.	Mestre Fumaca	TKO (Punches)	1	2:06
	Rico Chiapparelli	def.	Luiz Pantera	Decision (Unanimous)	3	5:00
	Leopoldo Montenegro	def.	Mark Schultz	Submission (Triangle Choke)	1	2:40
	Lyoto Machida	def.	Stephan Bonnar	TKO (Doctor Stoppage)	1	4:21
	Shinsuke Nakamura	def.	Shane Eitner	Submission (Keylock)	1	4:29
	Fabrício Werdum	def.	Gabriel Gonzaga	TKO (Punches)	3	2:11
	Justin McCully	def.	Dario Amorim	Decision (Unanimous)	3	5:00
	Marcelo Tigre	def.	Joseph Bamguish	Submission (Rear Naked Choke)	1	1:28
	Kazunari Murakami	def.	Lee Young Gun	Verbal Submission (Armbar)	1	1:09
	Ebenezer Fontes Braga	def.	Rodrigo Gripp de Sousa	Technical Submission (Guillotine Choke)	1	0:33
