= Fabiano Scherner =

Brazilian mixed martial arts fighter

- Born: June 30, 1972 (age 54); Tres Passos, Rio Grande do Sul, Brazil
- Other names: Pega-Leve (Take it Easy)
- Height: 6 ft 4 in (1.93 m)
- Weight: 257 lb (117 kg; 18 st 5 lb)
- Division: Heavyweight (MMA); Ultra-Heavyweight (BJJ)
- Reach: 74 in (190 cm)
- Style: Brazilian Jiu-Jitsu
- Stance: Orthodox
- Fighting out of: Portland, Oregon, U.S.
- Team: American Top Team Portland
- Rank: 5th degree black belt in Brazilian Jiu-Jitsu
- Years active: 2003–2018 (MMA)

Mixed martial arts record
- Total: 25
- Wins: 11
- By knockout: 5
- By submission: 6
- Losses: 11
- By knockout: 10
- By submission: 1
- No contests: 3

Other information
- Mixed martial arts record from Sherdog

Fabiano Scherner
Medal record

Brazilian Jiu-Jitsu

World No-gi Jiu-Jitsu Championship
Silver medal – second place	2013	Ultra-Heavyweight (black)
Gold medal – first place	2012	Senior 1 Ultra-Heavyweight (black)
Gold medal – first place	2012	Senior 1 Absolute (black)
Silver medal – second place	2011	Masters Ultra-Heavyweight (black)
Gold medal – first place	2011	Masters Absolute (black)

Masters World Jiu-Jitsu Championship
Gold medal – first place	2013	Ultra-Heavyweight (black)
Gold medal – first place	2013	Absolute (black)

Pan-American Championship
Silver medal – second place	2013	Ultra-Heavyweight (black)
Gold medal – first place	2012	Ultra-Heavyweight (black)
Bronze medal – third place	2012	Absolute (black)

American Nationals Championship
Gold medal – first place	2011	Ultra-Heavyweight (black)

American No-Gi Nationals Championship
Gold medal – first place	2011	Ultra-Heavyweight (black)
Bronze medal – third place	2011	Absolute (black)

Brazilian National Jiu-Jitsu Championship
Gold medal – first place	2001	Ultra-Heavyweight (purple)

Fabiano Scherner (born June 30, 1972) is a Brazilian former professional mixed martial artist and Brazilian jiu-jitsu black belt. He has fought in Cage Rage, IFL and the Ultimate Fighting Championship. Scherner is a Brazilian Jiu-Jitsu competitor who won multiple championships in all belt ranks on international and world stage in adult and master divisions.

== Background ==
Scherner was born in Tres Passos on June 30, 1972. In 1999, Scherner started training Brazilian Jiu-Jitsu in Brazil with Carlson Gracie student Murilo Rupp. There he was introduced to Mario Sperry, Murilo Bustamante, and Luis Roberto "Bebeo" Duarte. Bebeo was one of the founding members of the Brazilian Top Team (BTT) academy and invited Scherner to train with BTT.

Scherner received his black belt in a very fast three years and nine months. Shortly following this, Ricardo Liborio invited Scherner to start training MMA and teaching BJJ in Olympia, Washington. While in Olympia, Scherner began cross-training with fellow heavyweight Jeff Monson, as he worked to develop his MMA skills.

== Mixed martial arts career ==
=== Ultimate Fighting Championship ===
Scherner made his UFC debut against Brandon Vera, losing via TKO (knees & punches) in the second round.

In his second fight in the UFC, Scherner fought Gabriel Gonzaga, losing via TKO (Punches) in the second round. Following the loss, Scherner was released from the UFC.

=== IFL ===
After leaving the UFC, Scherner fought against Gilbert Yvel at Cage Rage 17 - Ultimate Challenge losing via TKO (Punches) in the first round. Scherner then fought in three other organizations in Brazil Before fighting in the IFL, racking up 2 wins and 1 no contest.

In 2008, Scherner fought Roy Nelson for the IFL Heavyweight Championship at IFL – Las Vegas losing via TKO (Punches) in the first round.

=== Post-IFL ===
Scherner returned to action four months later against Journeyman Mychal Clark who submitted Scherner with punches from a mounted position.

Scherner then fought Tracy Willis, and was knocked down by an overhand right early in the second round. Willis followed up with hammerfists that opened a cut on Scherner's forehead and prompted referee Josh Rosenthal to stop the fight.

Scherner fought Nick Braker on June 6, 2009, at Carnage at the Creek 6 winning via Submission (Rear-Naked Choke) at 3:08 of the first round.

Scherner lost his next fight against heavyweight prospect Mike Hayes via KO (Punch) at 3:50 of round 2.

Scherner fought Scott Junk at Galaxy MMA 1 – Worlds Collide, During the fight Scherner landed an unintentional low blow on Junk that dropped the Heavyweight to his knees. Junk laid on the cage floor for several minutes before he informed the ringside doctors he could no long continue. The fight was ruled a no contest with the official end coming just 27 seconds into round one.

Scherner was scheduled to fight fellow UFC veteran Brad Morris in Australia at Brace For War 6 on November 13, but he pulled out of the fight due to travel issues. He was replaced by Josh Ogilvie.

On January 20, 2012, Scherner entered WCFC: Last Man Standing 2, a 16 fighter, last-man-standing style MMA tournament. After winning his first fight, Scherner lost to the tournament winner Tyler East, in the final and main event.

On August 4, 2012, Scherner faced Anthony "Freight Train" Hamilton at SportFight 31. After connecting with a right and dropping him to the canvas, Scherner continued to throw strikes until Hamilton gave up his neck and Scherner was able to finish with an arm triangle choke, providing Hamilton with his only defeat via submission.

Less than 2 months later, on September 17, 2012, Scherner faced against the much younger Vitaly Minakov, losing via TKO (punches) late in the first round of the main event.

== Championships and accomplishments ==
- International Sport Karate Association
  - ISKA MMA Americas Heavyweight Championship (One time)
- Submission Underground - SUG
  - Submission Underground 7 Winner

== Mixed martial arts record ==
Professional record breakdown
25 matches	11 wins	11 losses
By knockout	5	9
By submission	6	2
No contests	3	

Res.	Record	Opponent	Method	Event	Date	Round	Time	Location	Notes
Loss	11–11 (3)	Tony Lopez	TKO (punches)	KOTC: Fight to the Finish	February 3, 2018	3	1:11	Lincoln City, Oregon, United States	For the KOTC Heavyweight Championship.
Win	11–10 (3)	D.J. Linderman	TKO (punches)	KOTC: Wipeout	June 4, 2016	1	2:55	Lincoln City, Oregon, United States	
Loss	10–10 (3)	Vitaly Minakov	KO (punches)	Fight Nights: Battle of Desne	September 17, 2012	1	3:51	Bryansk, Bryansk Oblast, Russia	
Win	10–9 (3)	Anthony Hamilton	Submission (arm-triangle choke)	SportFight 31: Battle at the Bay 2	August 4, 2012	1	2:02	Manson, Washington, United States	
Loss	9–9 (3)	Tyler East	KO (punches)	WCFC: Last Man Standing 2	January 20, 2012	1	0:36	Orem, Utah, United States	
Win	9–8 (3)	Andenilson Clementino	TKO (punches)	WCFC: Last Man Standing 2	January 20, 2012	1	2:12	Orem, Utah, United States	
NC	8–8 (3)	Scott Junk	NC (accidental kick to the groin)	Galaxy MMA 1: Worlds Collide	May 1, 2010	1	0:27	Honolulu, Hawaii, United States	
Loss	8–8 (2)	Mike Hayes	KO (punch)	ROTR 6: Final Countdown	November 21, 2009	2	3:50	Snoqualmie, Washington, United States	
Win	8–7 (2)	Nick Braker	Submission (rear-naked choke)	CATC 6: Carnage at the Creek 6	June 6, 2009	1	3:08	Shelton, Washington, United States	
Loss	7–7 (2)	Tracy Willis	TKO (punches)	Pro Battle MMA: Immediate Impact	October 4, 2008	2	2:49	Springdale United States	
Loss	7–6 (2)	Mychal Clark	Submission (punches)	SF 23: SportFight 23	June 20, 2008	2	3:51	Portland, United States	
Loss	7–5 (2)	Roy Nelson	TKO (punches)	IFL: Las Vegas	February 29, 2008	1	3:20	Las Vegas, Nevada, United States	For the IFL Heavyweight Championship.
Win	7–4 (2)	Dierley Buga	TKO (punches)	SFC 3: Sul Fighting Championship 3	December 12, 2007	1	N/A	Brazil	
NC	6–4 (2)	Maiquel Falcão	NC (cut from an illegal headbutt)	Desafio: Fight Show	December 8, 2007	1	N/A	Brazil	
Win	6–4 (1)	Marcelo Barbosa	KO (punch)	SS: Storm Samurai	July 28, 2007	1	N/A	Brazil	
Loss	5–4 (1)	Gilbert Yvel	TKO (punches)	Cage Rage 17	July 1, 2006	1	1:30	London, England	
Loss	5–3 (1)	Gabriel Gonzaga	TKO (punches)	UFC 60: Hughes vs. Gracie	May 27, 2006	2	0:24	Los Angeles, California, United States	
Loss	5–2 (1)	Brandon Vera	TKO (knees and punches)	UFC Ultimate Fight Night 2	October 3, 2005	2	3:22	Las Vegas, Nevada, United States	UFC debut.
Win	5–1 (1)	Aaron Brink	Submission (guillotine choke)	IFC: Rock N' Rumble	July 30, 2005	1	0:50	Nevada, United States	Won ISKA MMA Americas Heavyweight Championship.
Win	4–1 (1)	Brian Stromberg	Submission (guillotine choke)	SF 11: Rumble at the Rose Garden	July 9, 2005	1	1:13	Oregon, United States	
Win	3–1 (1)	Sebastian Rodriguez	Submission (armbar)	SF 10: Mayhem	May 28, 2005	1	2:35	Oregon, United States	
Win	2–1 (1)	Demian Decorah	Submission (armbar)	FCC 19: Freestyle Combat Challenge 19	May 14, 2005	N/A	N/A	Wisconsin, United States	
Loss	1–1 (1)	Assuério Silva	Submission (guillotine choke)	Jungle Fight 2	May 15, 2004	2	N/A	Manaus, Brazil	
NC	1–0 (1)	Assuério Silva	NC (injury)	Meca 9: Meca World Vale Tudo 9	August 1, 2003	1	3:23	Rio de Janeiro, Brazil	Scherner injured falling from ring.
Win	1–0	Scott Bowman	TKO (punches)	HOOKnSHOOT: Absolute Fighting Championships 3	May 24, 2003	1	2:35	Florida, United States	
