= 2004 in Pride FC =

Mixed martial arts events

Information
- First date: February 1, 2004
- Last date: December 31, 2004

Events
- Total events: 10

Fights
- Total fights: 91
- Title fights: 2

Chronology
| 2003 in Pride | 2004 in Pride FC | 2005 in Pride |

The year 2004 was the 8th year in the history of the Pride Fighting Championships, a mixed martial arts promotion based in Japan. 2004 had 10 events beginning with, Pride 27 - Inferno.

== Title fights ==
Title fights in 2004
| Weight class | | | | Method | Round | Time | Event | Notes |
|---|---|---|---|---|---|---|---|---|
| Middleweight | Wanderlei Silva (c) | def. | Quinton Jackson | KO (Knees) | 2 | 3:26 | Pride 28 - High Octane | (Note: For the Interim Pride Middleweight Championship.) |
| Heavyweight | Fedor Emelianenko (c) | def. | Antônio Rodrigo Nogueira (ic) | Decision (Unanimous) | 3 | 5:00 | Pride - Shockwave 2004 | (Note: For the Pride Fighting Championship World Heavyweight Championship.) |

== Debut Pride FC fighters ==
The following fighters fought their first Pride FC fight in 2004:

- Akihiro Gono
- Amar Suloev
- Bertrand Amoussou
- Brady Fink
- Charles Bennett
- Cory Peterson
- Crosley Gracie
- Dean Lister
- Egidijus Valavicius
- Fabio Mello
- Gan McGee
- Henry Miller
- Hiroyuki Abe
- Jadyson Costa
- James Thompson
- Jens Pulver
- Jin O Kim
- Jorge Patino
- Josh Barnett
- Katsuhisa Fujii
- Kazuo Misaki
- Kazuo Takahashi
- Luiz Firmino
- Makoto Takimoto
- Mal Foki
- Marcus Aurelio
- Mark Hunt
- Masakazu Imanari
- Matt Foki
- Mu Bae Choi
- Rulon Gardner
- Ryo Chonan
- Ryuki Ueyama
- Ryuta Sakurai
- Sean Sherk
- Sergey Ignatov
- Soa Palelei
- Stefan Leko
- Takanori Gomi
- Yasuaki Miyazono
- Yasuhito Namekawa
- Yoji Anjo
- Yukio Kawabe

== Events list ==
| # | Event | Japanese name | Date held | Venue | City | Attendance |
|---|---|---|---|---|---|---|
| 46 | Pride - Shockwave 2004 | Otoko Matsuri - Sadame | December 31, 2004 | Saitama Super Arena | Saitama, Japan | 48,398 |
| 45 | Pride 28 - High Octane | —N/a | October 31, 2004 | Saitama Super Arena | Saitama, Japan | 24,028 |
| 44 | Pride - Bushido 5 | —N/a | October 14, 2004 | Osaka Castle Hall | Osaka, Japan | —N/a |
| 43 | Pride FC - Final Conflict 2004 | Final Round | August 15, 2004 | Saitama Super Arena | Saitama, Japan | 47,629 |
| 42 | Pride - Bushido 4 | —N/a | July 19, 2004 | Nagoya Rainbow Hall | Nagoya, Japan | —N/a |
| 41 | Pride FC - Critical Countdown 2004 | 2nd Round | June 20, 2004 | Saitama Super Arena | Saitama, Japan | 43,711 |
| 40 | Pride - Bushido 3 | —N/a | May 23, 2004 | Yokohama Arena | Yokohama, Japan | —N/a |
| 39 | Pride FC - Total Elimination 2004 | 1st Round | April 25, 2004 | Saitama Super Arena | Saitama, Japan | 42,110 |
| 38 | Pride - Bushido 2 | —N/a | February 15, 2004 | Yokohama Arena | Yokohama, Japan | —N/a |
| 37 | Pride 27 - Inferno | Triumphal Return | February 1, 2004 | Osaka-jo Hall | Osaka, Japan | 13,366 |

== Pride 27: Inferno ==
Pride 27
- Promotion: Pride Fighting Championships
- Date: February 1, 2004
- Venue: Osaka Castle Hall
- City: Osaka
- Attendance: 13,366

Event chronology
| Pride: Shockwave 2003 | Pride 27 | Pride: Bushido 2 |

Pride 27: Inferno was an event held on February 1, 2004 at Osaka-jo Hall in Osaka, Japan.

=== Results ===
Main Card
| Weight class | | | | Method | Round | Time | Notes |
|---|---|---|---|---|---|---|---|
| | Mirko Cro Cop | def. | Ron Waterman | TKO (Soccer Kicks) | 1 | 4:37 |
| | Heath Herring | def. | Gan McGee | Decision (Split) | 3 | 5:00 |
| | Yoshihisa Yamamoto | def. | Mark Kerr | TKO (Punches) | 1 | 0:40 |
| | Kazuhiro Nakamura | def. | Alberto Rodriguez | Decision (Unanimous) | 3 | 5:00 |
| | Murilo Rua | def. | Alexander Otsuka | Submission (Arm-Triangle Choke) | 1 | 1:25 |
| | Sergei Kharitonov | def. | Cory Peterson | Submission (Armbar) | 1 | 1:23 |
| | Igor Vovchanchyn | def. | Dan Bobish | TKO (Punches) | 2 | 1:45 |

== Pride FC: Bushido 2 ==
Pride: Bushido 2
- Promotion: Pride Fighting Championships
- Date: February 15, 2004
- Venue: Yokohama Arena
- City: Yokohama

Event chronology
| Pride 27 | Pride: Bushido 2 | Pride: Total Elimination 2004 |

Pride FC: Bushido 2 was an event held on February 15, 2004 at the Yokohama Arena in Yokohama, Japan.

=== Results ===
Main Card
| Weight class | | | | Method | Round | Time | Notes |
|---|---|---|---|---|---|---|---|
| | (Brazil) Wanderlei Silva | def. | (Japan) Ikuhisa Minowa | KO (Punches) | 1 | 1:09 |
| | (Brazil) Maurício Rua | def. | (Japan) Akihiro Gono | TKO (Soccer Kicks) | 1 | 9:04 |
| | (Japan) Takanori Gomi | def. | (Brazil) Jadyson Costa | TKO (Punches) | 1 | 4:55 |
| | (Croatia) Mirko Cro Cop | def. | (Japan) Yoshihisa Yamamoto | TKO (Punches) | 1 | 2:12 |
| | (Brazil) Rodrigo Gracie | def. | (Japan) Hayato Sakurai | Decision (Unanimous) | 2 | 5:00 |
| | (Japan) Daiju Takase | def. | (United States) Chris Brennan | Decision (Unanimous) | 2 | 5:00 |
| | (Brazil) Mario Sperry | def. | (United States) Mike Bencic | KO (Punch) | 1 | 0:11 |
| | (United States) Sean Sherk | def. | (Japan) Ryuki Ueyama | Decision (Unanimous) | 2 | 5:00 |
| | (Japan) Yasuhito Namekawa | def. | (Lithuania) Egidijus Valavicius | Submission (Guillotine Choke) | 1 | 1:05 |
| | (Japan) Yushin Okami | def. | (Japan) Ryuta Sakurai | Decision (Unanimous) | 2 | 5:00 |
| | (South Korea) Mu Bae Choi | def. | (Japan) Yusuke Imamura | Submission (Rear Naked Choke) | 1 | 4:08 |

== Pride FC: Total Elimination 2004 ==
Pride: Total Elimination 2004
- Promotion: Pride Fighting Championships
- Date: April 25, 2004
- Venue: Saitama Super Arena
- City: Saitama
- Attendance: 42,110

Event chronology
| Pride: Bushido 2 | Pride: Total Elimination 2004 | Pride: Bushido 3 |

Pride FC: Total Elimination 2004 was an event held on April 25, 2004 at the Saitama Super Arena in Saitama, Japan. This event consisted of the first round of the 2004 Heavyweight Grand Prix. It took place on April 25, 2004, at the Saitama Super Arena in Saitama, Japan. The Grand Prix tournament continued with Pride: Critical Countdown 2004 and concluded with Pride: Final Conflict 2004.

=== Results ===
Main Card
| Weight class | | | | Method | Round | Time | Notes |
|---|---|---|---|---|---|---|---|
| | Fedor Emelianenko | def. | Mark Coleman | Submission (Armbar) | 1 | 2:11 |
| | Antônio Rodrigo Nogueira | def. | Hirotaka Yokoi | Submission (Anaconda Choke) | 2 | 1:25 |
| | Kevin Randleman | def. | Mirko Cro Cop | KO (Punches) | 1 | 1:57 |
| | Naoya Ogawa | def. | Stefan Leko | Submission (Arm-Triangle Choke) | 1 | 1:34 |
| | Semmy Schilt | def. | Gan McGee | Submission (Armbar) | 1 | 5:02 |
| | Paulo Cesar Silva | def. | Henry Miller | Submission (Kimura) | 1 | 4:04 |
| | Sergei Kharitonov | def. | Murilo Rua | KO (Punches) | 1 | 4:14 |
| | Heath Herring | def. | Kazuo Takahashi | TKO (Punches) | 1 | 4:53 |

=== Pride 2004 Heavyweight Grand Prix bracket ===
Total Elimination
(Russia) | Sergei Kharitonov | KO
(Brazil) | Murilo Rua | 4:14
(Netherlands) | Semmy Schilt | SUB
(United States) | Gan McGee | 5:02
(Japan) | Naoya Ogawa | SUB
(Germany) | Stefan Leko | 1:34
(Brazil) | Paulo Cesar Silva | SUB
(United States) | Henry Miller | 4:04
(United States) | Heath Herring | TKO
(Japan) | Kazuo Takahashi | 4:53
(Brazil) | Antônio Rodrigo Nogueira | SUB
(Japan) | Hirotaka Yokoi | 11:25
(Russia) | Fedor Emelianenko | SUB
(United States) | Mark Coleman | 2:11
(United States) | Kevin Randleman | KO
(Croatia) | Mirko Cro Cop | 1:57

Critical Countdown
(Russia) | Sergei Kharitonov
(Netherlands) | Semmy Schilt
(Japan) | Naoya Ogawa
(Brazil) | Paulo Cesar Silva
(United States) | Heath Herring
(Brazil) | Antônio Rodrigo Nogueira
(Russia) | Fedor Emelianenko
(United States) | Kevin Randleman

Final Conflict

Final Conflict

== Pride FC: Bushido 3 ==
Pride: Bushido 3
- Promotion: Pride Fighting Championships
- Date: May 23, 2004
- Venue: Yokohama Arena
- City: Yokohama

Event chronology
| Pride: Total Elimination 2004 | Pride: Bushido 3 | Pride: Critical Countdown 2004 |

Pride FC: Bushido 3 was an event held on May 23, 2004 at the Yokohama Arena in Yokohama, Japan.

=== Results ===
Main Card
| Weight class | | | | Method | Round | Time | Notes |
|---|---|---|---|---|---|---|---|
| | Ryan Gracie | def. | Ikuhisa Minowa | Decision (Split) | 2 | 5:00 |
| | Takanori Gomi | def. | Ralph Gracie | TKO (Knees) | 1 | 0:06 |
| | Ricardo Almeida | def. | Ryo Chonan | Decision (Unanimous) | 2 | 5:00 |
| | Mirko Cro Cop | def. | Hiromitsu Kanehara | Decision (Unanimous) | 2 | 5:00 |
| | Kazuhiro Nakamura | def. | Chalid Arrab | Submission (Armbar) | 1 | 4:45 |
| | Akira Shoji | def. | Yukio Kawabe | TKO (Punches) | 1 | 0:18 |
| | Daiju Takase | def. | Carlos Newton | Decision (Split) | 2 | 5:00 |
| | Kazuo Misaki | def. | Jorge Patino | Decision (Unanimous) | 2 | 5:00 |
| | Mu Bae Choi | def. | Yoshihisa Yamamoto | Decision (Unanimous) | 2 | 5:00 |
| | Alexander Emelianenko | def. | Matt Foki | Submission (Rear-Naked Choke) | 1 | 3:16 |
| | Katsuhisa Fujii | def. | Jin O Kim | Submission (Rear-Naked Choke) | 1 | 2:58 |
| | Bertrand Amoussou | def. | Yasuaki Miyazono | KO (Punch) | 2 | 0:29 |

== Pride FC: Critical Countdown 2004 ==
Pride: Critical Countdown 2004
- Promotion: Pride Fighting Championships
- Date: June 20, 2004
- Venue: Saitama Super Arena
- City: Saitama
- Attendance: 43,711

Event chronology
| Pride: Bushido 3 | Pride: Critical Countdown 2004 | Pride: Bushido 4 |

Pride FC: Critical Countdown 2004 was an event held on June 20, 2004 at the Saitama Super Arena in Saitama, Japan.

=== Results ===
Main Card
| Weight class | | | | Method | Round | Time | Notes |
|---|---|---|---|---|---|---|---|
| | Fedor Emelianenko | def. | Kevin Randleman | Submission (Kimura) | 1 | 1:33 |
| | Antônio Rodrigo Nogueira | def. | Heath Herring | Submission (Anaconda Choke) | 2 | 0:30 |
| | Hidehiko Yoshida | def. | Mark Hunt | Submission (Armbar) | 1 | 5:25 |
| | Naoya Ogawa | def. | Paulo Cesar Silva | TKO (Punches) | 1 | 3:29 |
| | Sergei Kharitonov | def. | Semmy Schilt | TKO (Punches) | 1 | 9:19 |
| | Quinton Jackson | def. | Ricardo Arona | KO (Slam) | 1 | 7:32 |
| | Kazushi Sakuraba | def. | Antônio Schembri | Decision (Unanimous) | 3 | 5:00 |

=== Pride 2004 Heavyweight Grand Prix bracket ===
Total Elimination
(Russia) | Sergei Kharitonov | KO
(Brazil) | Murilo Rua | 4:14
(Netherlands) | Semmy Schilt | SUB
(United States) | Gan McGee | 5:02
(Japan) | Naoya Ogawa | SUB
(Germany) | Stefan Leko | 1:34
(Brazil) | Paulo Cesar Silva | SUB
(United States) | Henry Miller | 4:04
(United States) | Heath Herring | TKO
(Japan) | Kazuo Takahashi | 4:53
(Brazil) | Antônio Rodrigo Nogueira | SUB
(Japan) | Hirotaka Yokoi | 11:25
(Russia) | Fedor Emelianenko | SUB
(United States) | Mark Coleman | 2:11
(United States) | Kevin Randleman | KO
(Croatia) | Mirko Cro Cop | 1:57

Critical Countdown
(Russia) | Sergei Kharitonov | TKO
(Netherlands) | Semmy Schilt | 9:19
(Japan) | Naoya Ogawa | TKO
(Brazil) | Paulo Cesar Silva | 3:29
(United States) | Heath Herring | 10:30
(Brazil) | Antônio Rodrigo Nogueira | SUB
(Russia) | Fedor Emelianenko | SUB
(United States) | Kevin Randleman | 1:33

Final Conflict
(Russia) | Fedor Emelianenko
(Japan) | Naoya Ogawa
(Brazil) | Antônio Rodrigo Nogueira
(Russia) | Sergei Kharitonov

Final Conflict

== Pride FC: Bushido 4 ==
Pride: Bushido 4
- Promotion: Pride Fighting Championships
- Date: July 19, 2004
- Venue: Nagoya Rainbow Hall
- City: Nagoya

Event chronology
| Pride: Critical Countdown 2004 | Pride: Bushido 4 | Pride: Final Conflict 2004 |

Pride FC: Bushido 4 was an event held on July 19, 2004 at the Nagoya Rainbow Hall in Nagoya, Japan.

=== Results ===
Main Card
| Weight class | | | | Method | Round | Time | Notes |
|---|---|---|---|---|---|---|---|
| | Antônio Rogério Nogueira | def. | Kazuhiro Nakamura | Decision (Split) | 2 | 5:00 |
| | Takanori Gomi | def. | Fabio Mello | TKO (Punches) | 1 | 8:07 |
| | Paulo Filho | def. | Akira Shoji | Decision (Split) | 2 | 5:00 |
| | Mirko Cro Cop | def. | Shungo Oyama | TKO (Punches) | 1 | 1:00 |
| | Takashi Sugiura | def. | Paulo Cesar Silva | TKO (Punches) | 1 | 2:35 |
| | Ikuhisa Minowa | def. | Kenichi Yamamoto | TKO (Punches) | 1 | 3:23 |
| | Hayato Sakurai | def. | Brady Fink | Submission (Guillotine Choke) | 1 | 4:08 |
| | Amar Suloev | def. | Dean Lister | Decision (Split) | 2 | 5:00 |
| | Dokonjonosuke Mishima | def. | Marcus Aurelio | Decision (Split) | 2 | 5:00 |
| | Luiz Firmino | def. | Hiroyuki Abe | Submission (Arm-Triangle Choke) | 1 | 2:52 |
| | Kyosuke Sasaki | vs. | Eiji Mitsuoka | Draw | 2 | 5:00 |

== Pride FC: Final Conflict 2004 ==
Pride: Final Conflict 2004
- Promotion: Pride Fighting Championships
- Date: August 15, 2004
- Venue: Saitama Super Arena
- City: Saitama
- Attendance: 47,629

Event chronology
| Pride: Bushido 4 | Pride: Final Conflict 2004 | Pride: Bushido 5 |

Pride FC: Final Conflict 2004 was an event held on August 15, 2004 at the Saitama Super Arena in Saitama, Japan.

=== Results ===
Main Card
| Weight class | | | | Method | Round | Time | Notes |
|---|---|---|---|---|---|---|---|
| | Fedor Emelianenko | vs. | Antônio Rodrigo Nogueira | No Contest - Accidental Cut | 1 | 3:52 |
| | Wanderlei Silva | def. | Yuki Kondo | KO (Stomps) | 1 | 2:46 |
| | Mirko Cro Cop | def. | Alexander Emelianenko | KO (Head Kick and Punches) | 1 | 2:09 |
| | Ron Waterman | def. | Kevin Randleman | Submission (Keylock) | 1 | 7:44 |
| | Fedor Emelianenko | def. | Naoya Ogawa | Submission (Armbar) | 1 | 0:54 |
| | Antônio Rodrigo Nogueira | def. | Sergei Kharitonov | Decision (Unanimous) | 2 | 5:00 |
| | Kazuhiro Nakamura | def. | Murilo Bustamante | Decision (Unanimous) | 3 | 5:00 |

=== Pride 2004 Heavyweight Grand Prix bracket ===
Total Elimination
(Russia) | Sergei Kharitonov | KO
(Brazil) | Murilo Rua | 4:14
(Netherlands) | Semmy Schilt | SUB
(United States) | Gan McGee | 5:02
(Japan) | Naoya Ogawa | SUB
(Germany) | Stefan Leko | 1:34
(Brazil) | Paulo Cesar Silva | SUB
(United States) | Henry Miller | 4:04
(United States) | Heath Herring | TKO
(Japan) | Kazuo Takahashi | 4:53
(Brazil) | Antônio Rodrigo Nogueira | SUB
(Japan) | Hirotaka Yokoi | 11:25
(Russia) | Fedor Emelianenko | SUB
(United States) | Mark Coleman | 2:11
(United States) | Kevin Randleman | KO
(Croatia) | Mirko Cro Cop | 1:57

Critical Countdown
(Russia) | Sergei Kharitonov | TKO
(Netherlands) | Semmy Schilt | 9:19
(Japan) | Naoya Ogawa | TKO
(Brazil) | Paulo Cesar Silva | 3:29
(United States) | Heath Herring | 10:30
(Brazil) | Antônio Rodrigo Nogueira | SUB
(Russia) | Fedor Emelianenko | SUB
(United States) | Kevin Randleman | 1:33

Final Conflict
(Russia) | Fedor Emelianenko ^{1} | SUB
(Japan) | Naoya Ogawa | 0:54
(Brazil) | Antônio Rodrigo Nogueira | UD
(Russia) | Sergei Kharitonov | 15:00

Final Conflict
(Russia) | Fedor Emelianenko ^{1} | NC
(Brazil) | Antônio Rodrigo Nogueira | 3:52

^{1} The tournament finals initially occurred at Final Conflict, but ended in a no-contest doctor's stoppage and were rescheduled for Pride: Shockwave 2004.

== Pride FC: Bushido 5 ==
Pride: Bushido 5
- Promotion: Pride Fighting Championships
- Date: October 14, 2004
- Venue: Osaka Castle Hall
- City: Osaka

Event chronology
| Pride: Final Conflict 2004 | Pride: Bushido 5 | Pride 28 |

Pride FC: Bushido 5 was an event held on October 14, 2004 at the Osaka Castle Hall in Osaka, Japan.

=== Results ===
Main Card
| Weight class | | | | Method | Round | Time | Notes |
|---|---|---|---|---|---|---|---|
| | Takanori Gomi | def. | Charles Bennett | Technical Submission (Kimura) | 1 | 5:52 |
| | Crosley Gracie | def. | Hayato Sakurai | Submission (Armbar) | 2 | 1:02 |
| | Ryo Chonan | def. | Carlos Newton | Decision (Unanimous) | 2 | 5:00 |
| | Igor Vovchanchyn | def. | Katsuhisa Fujii | KO (Punches) | 1 | 4:02 |
| | Ikuhisa Minowa | def. | Ryuki Ueyama | Decision (Split) | 2 | 5:00 |
| | Luiz Firmino | def. | Masakazu Imanari | Decision (Unanimous) | 2 | 5:00 |
| | Henry Miller | def. | Mal Foki | KO (Punches) | 1 | 0:21 |
| | Maurício Rua | def. | Yasuhito Namekawa | TKO (Punches) | 1 | 6:02 |

== Pride 28: High Octane ==
Pride 28
- Promotion: Pride Fighting Championships
- Date: October 31, 2004
- Venue: Saitama Super Arena
- City: Saitama
- Attendance: 24,028

Event chronology
| Pride: Bushido 5 | Pride 28 | Pride: Shockwave 2004 |

Pride 28: High Octane was an event held on October 31, 2004 at the Saitama Super Arena in Saitama, Japan.

=== Results ===
Main Card
| Weight class | | | | Method | Round | Time | Notes |
|---|---|---|---|---|---|---|---|
| Middleweight | (Brazil) Wanderlei Silva (c) | def. | (United States) Quinton Jackson | KO (Knees) | 2 | 3:26 | (Note: For the Pride Middleweight Championship.) |
| | (Croatia) Mirko Cro Cop | def. | (United States) Josh Barnett | TKO (Shoulder Injury) | 1 | 0:46 |
| | (United States) Dan Henderson | def. | (Japan) Kazuhiro Nakamura | TKO (Shoulder Injury) | 1 | 1:15 |
| | (New Zealand) Mark Hunt | def. | (United States) Dan Bobish | TKO (Kick to the Body) | 1 | 6:23 |
| | (Netherlands) Alistair Overeem | def. | (Japan) Hiromitsu Kanehara | TKO (Doctor Stoppage) | 2 | 3:52 |
| | (Russia) Aleksander Emelianenko | def. | (England) James Thompson | KO (Punch) | 1 | 0:11 |
| | (Brazil) Ricardo Arona | def. | (Russia) Sergey Ignatov | Submission (Rear-Naked Choke) | 1 | 9:05 |
| | (South Korea) Mu Bae Choi | def. | (Australia) Soa Palelei | Submission (Rear-Naked Choke) | 2 | 4:55 |
| | (United States) Heath Herring | def. | (Japan) Hirotaka Yokoi | KO (Knees) | 1 | 1:55 |

== Pride FC: Shockwave 2004 ==
Pride: Shockwave 2004
- Promotion: Pride Fighting Championships
- Date: December 31, 2004
- Venue: Saitama Super Arena
- City: Saitama
- Attendance: 48,398

Event chronology
| Pride 28 | Pride: Shockwave 2004 | Pride 29 |

Pride FC: Shockwave 2004 was an event held on December 31, 2004 at the Saitama Super Arena in Saitama, Japan.

=== Results ===
Main Card
| Weight class | | | | Method | Round | Time | Notes |
|---|---|---|---|---|---|---|---|
| Heavyweight | (Russia) Fedor Emelianenko (c) | def. | (Brazil) Antônio Rodrigo Nogueira (ic) | Decision (Unanimous) | 3 | 5:00 | (Note: For the Pride Fighting Championship World Heavyweight Championship.) |
| | (New Zealand) Mark Hunt | def. | (Brazil) Wanderlei Silva | Decision (Split) | 3 | 5:00 |
| | (Japan) Takanori Gomi | def. | (United States) Jens Pulver | KO (Punch) | 1 | 6:21 |
| | (United States) Dan Henderson | def. | (Japan) Yuki Kondo | Decision (Split) | 3 | 5:00 |
| | (Croatia) Mirko Cro Cop | def. | (United States) Kevin Randleman | Submission (Guillotine Choke) | 1 | 0:41 |
| | (United States) Rulon Gardner | def. | (Japan) Hidehiko Yoshida | Decision (Unanimous) | 3 | 5:00 |
| | (Japan) Makoto Takimoto | def. | (United States) Henry Miller | Decision (Unanimous) | 3 | 5:00 |
| | (Japan) Ryo Chonan | def. | (Brazil) Anderson Silva | Submission (Flying Scissor Heel Hook) | 3 | 3:08 |
| | (Brazil) Ryan Gracie | def. | (Japan) Yoji Anjo | Submission (Armbar) | 1 | 8:33 |
| | (South Korea) Mu Bae Choi | def. | (Brazil) Paulo Cesar Silva | Submission (Arm Triangle Choke) | 1 | 5:47 |
| | (Japan) Ikuhisa Minowa | def. | (Germany) Stefan Leko | Submission (Heel Hook) | 1 | 0:27 |

== See also ==
- Pride Fighting Championships
- List of Pride Fighting Championships champions
- List of Pride Fighting events
