= Dream 6 =

Mixed martial arts event in 2008

Dream 6: Middle Weight Grandprix 2008 Final Round
- The poster for Dream 6: Middle Weight Grandprix 2008 Final Round
- Promotion: Dream
- Date: September 23, 2008
- Venue: Saitama Super Arena
- City: Saitama, Japan
- Attendance: 25,000

Event chronology
Dream 5: Light Weight Grandprix 2008 Final Round	Dream 6: Middle Weight Grandprix 2008 Final Round	DREAM.7: Feather Weight Grandprix 1st Round

Dream 6: Middle Weight Grandprix 2008 Final Round was a mixed martial arts event promoted by Fighting and Entertainment Group's mixed martial arts promotion Dream on September 23, 2008. The event hosted the crowning of Dream's first Middleweight Champion, Gegard Mousasi, after the conclusion of the Middleweight Grand Prix.

== Background ==
A bout between Ronaldo Souza and Frank Trigg was announced for the Middleweight Grand Prix. Trigg would subsequently announce that a visa wasn't secured and the bout between the two wasn't finalized. Trigg was replaced by National university freestyle wrestling champion Ian Murphy.

Jason Miller made his DREAM debut, facing Katsuyori Shibata in the first round of the Grand Prix.

Taiei Kin was pitted against Ikuhisa Minowa, while Gegard Mousasi was expected to fight the PRIDE 2006 Welterweight Grand Prix finalist Denis Kang. Yoon Dong-Sik was booked to fight Shungo Oyama.

Japanese superstar Kazushi Sakuraba faced Andrews Nakahara.

The last fight announced was Kiyoshi Tamura against Masakatsu Funaki.

== Results ==
Middleweight Grand Prix 2008 Final
Weight class				Method	Round	Time	Notes
Middleweight	Gegard Mousasi	def.	Ronaldo Souza	KO (upkick)	1	2:15
Main Card
Heavyweight	Alistair Overeem	vs.	Mirko Cro Cop	No Contest (knee to the groin)	1	6:09
Lightweight	Shinya Aoki	def.	Todd Moore	Submission (neck crank)	1	1:10
Middleweight	Yoshihiro Akiyama	def.	Masanori Tonooka	Submission (armbar)	1	6:26
Welterweight	Hayato Sakurai	def.	Kuniyoshi Hironaka	Decision (unanimous)	2	5:00
Middleweight	Masakatsu Funaki	def.	Ikuhisa Minowa	Submission (heel hook)	1	0:52
Featherweight	Atsushi Yamamoto	def.	Hideo Tokoro	Decision (unanimous)	2	5:00
Heavyweight	Sergei Kharitonov	def.	Jimmy Ambriz	Submission (punches)	1	2:15
Lightweight	Keita Nakamura	def.	Adriano Martins	Decision (split)	2	5:00
Middleweight Grand Prix Semi final
Middleweight	Ronaldo Souza	def.	Zelg Galesic	Submission (armbar)	1	1:27
Middleweight	Gegard Mousasi	def.	Melvin Manhoef	Submission (triangle choke)	1	1:28
Middleweight Grand Prix reserve bout
Middleweight	Andrews Nakahara	def.	Dong Sik Yoon	TKO (punches)	2	0:30

== 2008 Middleweight Grand Prix bracket ==
First round
(Brazil)	Ronaldo Souza	W Sub
(United States)	Ian Murphy
(United States)	Jason Miller	W TKO
(Japan)	Katsuyori Shibata
(Croatia)	Zelg Galesic	W Sub
(Russia)	Magomed Sultanakhmedov
(Japan)	Taiei Kin	W Dec
(Japan)	Ikuhisa Minowa
(Armenia)	Gegard Mousasi	W Sub
(Canada)	Denis Kang
(South Korea)	Yoon Dong-Sik	W Dec
(Japan)	Shungo Oyama
(Japan)	Kazushi Sakuraba	W Sub
(Brazil)	Andrews Nakahara
(Japan)	Kiyoshi Tamura	W TKO
(Japan)	Masakatsu Funaki

Quarterfinals
(Brazil)	Ronaldo Souza	W Dec
(United States)	Jason Miller
(Croatia)	Zelg Galesic	W TKO
(Japan)	Taiei Kin
(Armenia)	Gegard Mousasi	W Dec
(South Korea)	Yoon Dong-Sik
(Japan)	Kazushi Sakuraba
(Netherlands)	Melvin Manhoef**	Win KO

Semifinals
(Brazil)	Ronaldo Souza	W Sub
(Croatia)	Zelg Galesic
(Armenia)	Gegard Mousasi	W SUB
(Netherlands)	Melvin Manhoef

Finals
(Brazil)	Ronaldo Souza
(Armenia)	Gegard Mousasi	W KO

** = Replacement

Dream Middleweight Grand Prix Reserve Bouts:

(Netherlands) Melvin Manhoef def. (South Korea) Dae Won Kim at Dream 3
(Brazil) Andrews Nakahara def. (South Korea) Yoon Dong-sik at Dream 6

== Notes ==
- Badr Hari approached the ring prior to the Middle-Weight Final bout and challenged the Dream Heavyweight fighters to a match against him at the K-1 Dynamite Show in Tokyo. He also insulted the performance of the competitors by stating "All I've seen tonight is a bunch of hugging and kissing"
- Fedor Emelianenko announced his desire to participate in Dream's New Year show: Fields Dynamite!! 2008 on December 31 at the Saitama Super Arena. He was expected to face the winner of the Cro Cop vs. Overeem bout, but due to the No Contest, his opponent remained undecided.
- Joachim Hansen addressed the crowd and announced his participation at Fields Dynamite!! 2008, with his opponent to be determined.
- A number of World Victory Road fighters were in attendance and Yoshihiro Akiyama hinted at a potential merger on the horizon by declaring he wanted to fight Hidehiko Yoshida next. Notable WVR fighters at Dream.6 included Takanori Gomi, Xande Ribeiro, and Josh Barnett.
- The Average TBS broadcast rating was 9.0 with a peak of 13.4 during the Akiyama vs. Tonooka fight. Announced attendance was 25,000.
- Mirko Cro Cop was taken to a hospital for treatment and was unavailable for post-fight comments.

== Tournament bonuses ==
- Semifinalists Zelg Galesic and Melvin Manhoef both earned a 1,000,000円 bonus for their performance in the tournament.
- Runner-up Ronaldo 'Jacare' Souza received a 3,000,000円 bonus for his efforts.
- Winner Gegard Mousasi earned a 10,000,000円 bonus to become Dream's first Middle-Weight Champion.

== See also ==
- Dream (mixed martial arts)
- List of Dream champions
- 2008 in DREAM
