= Zelg Galešić =

Croatian mixed martial arts fighter

- Born: 16 February 1979 (age 47); Pula, SR Croatia, SFR Yugoslavia
- Other names: Benkei
- Nationality: Croatian
- Height: 6 ft 1 in (1.85 m)
- Weight: 205 lb (93 kg; 14.6 st)
- Division: Light Heavyweight; Middleweight
- Reach: 72 in (180 cm)
- Stance: Orthodox
- Fighting out of: Pula, Croatia
- Team: London Shootfighters
- Rank: 4th dan black belt in Taekwondo
- Years active: 2004–2013

Mixed martial arts record
- Total: 20
- Wins: 11
- By knockout: 9
- By submission: 2
- Losses: 9
- By knockout: 2
- By submission: 7

Other information
- Mixed martial arts record from Sherdog

Zelg Galešić (born 16 February 1979) is a Croatian mixed martial artist. A professional competitor who began his career in 2004, he fought for Bellator MMA, Cage Rage, PRIDE, DREAM, UCMMA, the SFL, and K-1 Hero's. He is the former Cage Rage British Middleweight Champion.

== Background ==
Galešić began Tae Kwon Do when he was ten years old and is a master of the sport, being a three-time ITF European Champion, two-time ITF World Champion, and two-time ITC Full Contact World Champion. He was undefeated in amateur rules in the UK at the Combat Sports Open Trials, where all but one of his fights were won in under a minute.

== Mixed martial arts career ==
=== Early career ===
His first professional MMA bout was on 12 September 2004 at Ultimate Combat 11: Wrath of the Beast, where he won against Jim Bentley when the referee stopped the fight after 16 seconds.

On 30 August 2007, while Cage Rage British Middleweight Champion, he was made an offer to fight for K-1 Hero's, which he accepted. He lost against Yoon Dong-sik.

=== DREAM ===
His first fights with DREAM, in 2008, were victories against Magomed Sultanakhmedov then Taiei Kin. However, in Galešić's most recent fights he has lost to Ronaldo Souza and Kazushi Sakuraba.

Having lost to former PRIDE veteran Kazushi Sakuraba, Galešić took 15 months off. He returned to fight on Liverpool's OMMAC promotion, where he took on a local fighter, Lee Chadwick. Galešić won the fight with a knockout in the first round.

=== Bellator ===
Galešić competed in the eight man Bellator Season 5 Middleweight Tournament. In the quarter-finals at Bellator 50 he lost to Alexander Shlemenko by guillotine choke in the first round.

He next competed on India's Super Fight League's third event, SFL 3, against former WEC Light Heavyweight Champion Doug Marshall. He won the fight via KO early into the first round due to a flying knee.

Galešić moved to Light Heavyweight in order to compete in the Bellator 2012 Heavyweight Tournament. He was beaten by Attila Vegh at Bellator 71 in the quarter-finals via a submission in the first round.

He fought Linton Vassell for UCMMA Light Heavyweight Championship on 2 February 2013. Zelg lost the fight on the ground, by first round TKO.

== Kickboxing career ==
Zelg made his kickboxing debut against #12 Glory ranked fighter Makoto Uehara at the R.I.S.E. 100 event on 12 June 2014. He dropped Uehara early in round one with punches and knees but rushed it and lost by KO at 1:25 of the first round.

== Championships and accomplishments ==
- Cage Rage
  - Cage Rage British Middleweight Championship (1 Time)
- DREAM
  - 2008 DREAM Middleweight Grand Prix Semifinalist

== Kickboxing record ==
Kickboxing Record
0 Wins, 1 Loss
Date	Result	Opponent	Event	Location	Method	Round	Time	Record
2014-07-12	Loss	(Japan) Makoto Uehara	RISE 100	Tokyo, Japan	KO (Right Hook)	1	1:25	0–1
Kickboxing debut.
Legend: Win Loss Draw/No contest Notes

== Mixed martial arts record ==
Professional record breakdown
20 matches	11 wins	9 losses
By knockout	9	2
By submission	2	7

Res.	Record	Opponent	Method	Event	Date	Round	Time	Location	Notes
Loss	11–9	Ricco Rodriguez	Submission (armbar)	Final Fight Championship 8	25 October 2013	1	2:10	Zagreb, Croatia	Catchweight 95 kg.
Loss	11–8	Linton Vassell	TKO (punches)	UCMMA 32	2 February 2013	1	4:31	London, England	For UCMMA Light Heavyweight Championship.
Loss	11–7	Attila Vegh	Submission (rear-naked choke)	Bellator 71	22 June 2012	1	1:00	Chester, West Virginia, United States	Light Heavyweight debut; Bellator 2012 Light Heavyweight Tournament Quarterfinal.
Win	11–6	Doug Marshall	KO (flying knee)	SFL 3	6 May 2012	1	0:34	New Delhi, Delhi, India	
Loss	10–6	Alexander Shlemenko	Submission (standing guillotine choke)	Bellator 50	17 September 2011	1	1:55	Hollywood, Florida, United States	Bellator 2011 Middleweight Tournament Quarterfinal.
Win	10–5	Lee Chadwick	KO (punch)	OMMAC 9: Enemies	5 March 2011	1	2:40	Liverpool, England	
Loss	9–5	Kazushi Sakuraba	Submission (kneebar)	DREAM 12	26 October 2009	1	1:40	Osaka, Japan	
Loss	9–4	Ronaldo Souza	Submission (armbar)	DREAM 6: Middleweight Grand Prix 2008 Final Round	23 September 2008	1	1:27	Saitama, Saitama, Japan	DREAM Middleweight Grand Prix Semifinal.
Win	9–3	Taiei Kin	TKO (elbow injury)	DREAM 4: Middleweight Grand Prix 2008 Second Round	15 June 2008	1	1:05	Yokohama, Japan	DREAM Middleweight Grand Prix Quarterfinal.
Win	8–3	Magomed Sultanakhmedov	Submission (armbar)	DREAM 2: Middleweight Grand Prix 2008 First Round	29 April 2008	1	1:40	Saitama, Saitama, Japan	DREAM Middleweight Grand Prix Opening Round.
Win	7–3	Taiei Kin	TKO (doctor stoppage)	HERO'S 2007 in Korea	28 October 2007	1	0:36	Seoul, South Korea	Catchweight 95 kg.
Loss	6–3	Yoon Dong-sik	Submission (armbar)	Hero's 10	17 September 2007	1	1:29	Yokohama, Japan	
Loss	6–2	Makoto Takimoto	Submission (kimura)	PRIDE 34	8 April 2007	1	5:40	Saitama, Saitama, Japan	
Win	6–1	Mark Weir	KO (punches)	Cage Rage 19	9 December 2006	1	0:50	London, England	Won Cage Rage British Middleweight Championship.
Win	5–1	James Evans-Nicolle	TKO (stomp and punches)	Cage Rage 18	30 September 2006	1	2:02	London, England	
Win	4–1	Curtis Stout	Submission (armbar)	Cage Rage 17	1 July 2006	1	1:10	London, England	
Win	3–1	Michael Holmes	TKO (punches)	Cage Rage 15	4 February 2006	1	1:41	London, England	
Win	2–1	John Flemming	KO (punches)	Urban Destruction 2	30 July 2005	1	N/A	Bristol, England	
Loss	1–1	Paul Taylor	TKO (punches)	Urban Destruction 1	10 April 2005	3	1:42	Bristol, England	
Win	1–0	Jim Bentley	KO (punch)	UC 11: Wrath of the Beast	12 September 2004	1	1:16	Bristol, England	
