= Fredson Paixão =

Brazilian BJJ practitioner and MMA fighter

Fredson Paixão Da Silva Melo
- Born: May 13, 1979 (age 47); Parintins, Amazonas, Brazil
- Height: 5 ft 6 in (1.68 m)
- Weight: 145 lb (66 kg; 10.4 st)
- Division: Featherweight
- Fighting out of: Las Vegas, Nevada, United States
- Team: Fredson Paixão Brazilian Jiu Jitsu Association; Gracie Barra Combat Team
- Rank: 4th degree black belt in Brazilian jiu-jitsu

Mixed martial arts record
- Total: 17
- Wins: 11
- By knockout: 1
- By submission: 6
- By decision: 4
- Losses: 5
- By knockout: 1
- By decision: 4
- No contests: 1

Other information
- Website: https://fredsonpaixaobjj.com/
- Mixed martial arts record from Sherdog

Fredson Paixão Melo (Portuguese pronunciation: [ˈfɾɛdʒisõ pajˈʃɐ̃w]; born May 13, 1979) is a Brazilian mixed martial artist and Brazilian jiu-jitsu practitioner. He has competed as a featherweight the UFC, WEC, Deep, and Jungle Fight. He is also a world champion in Brazilian jiu-jitsu.

== Background ==
Paixão earned his black belt from Osvaldo Alves in 1998. He has won multiple World Championships as a black belt. He took first place at Mundials in 1998 (as a purple belt); and in 2001, 2002, and 2005 (as a black belt). In addition, he finished second (silver medal) in 2004.

In May 2010, Paixão defeated Caol Uno in a submission grappling bout at the UFC Fan Expo held in Las Vegas at UFC 114.

== Mixed martial arts career ==
Paixão made his WEC debut at WEC 40, where he lost a unanimous decision to Wagnney Fabiano.

In his next fight, Paixao fought Cole Province at WEC 42, where he originally suffered a split decision loss. The result was later changed to a no contest after Province tested positive for banned substances during a post-fight screening.

Paixão was expected to face Bryan Caraway on March 6, 2010, at WEC 47, but Caraway was forced off the card with an injury. Paixão instead faced Courtney Buck and won via first round submission. Paixão eventually fought and defeated Caraway via split decision at WEC 50.

=== Ultimate Fighting Championship ===
In October 2010, World Extreme Cagefighting merged with the Ultimate Fighting Championship. As part of the merger, all WEC fighters were transferred to the UFC. Paixão has the distinction of being part of the very first featherweight fight in UFC history. His UFC debut was against Pablo Garza at The Ultimate Fighter: Team GSP vs. Team Koscheck Finale. Paixão was knocked out in the first round by a flying knee from Garza and subsequently released from the promotion.

== Personal life ==
Paixão has a daughter named Emma. He appears in the video game UFC Undisputed 3.

== Mixed martial arts record ==
Professional record breakdown
17 matches	11 wins	5 losses
By knockout	1	1
By submission	6	0
By decision	4	4
No contests	1	

Res.	Record	Opponent	Method	Event	Date	Round	Time	Location	Notes
Loss	11–5 (1)	Lance Palmer	Decision (split)	RFA 4: Griffin vs. Escudero	November 2, 2012	3	5:00	Las Vegas, Nevada, United States	
Loss	11–4 (1)	Pablo Garza	KO (flying knee)	The Ultimate Fighter 12 Finale	December 4, 2010	1	0:51	Las Vegas, Nevada, United States	First Featherweight fight in UFC history.
Win	11–3 (1)	Bryan Caraway	Decision (split)	WEC 50	August 18, 2010	3	5:00	Las Vegas, Nevada, United States	
Win	10–3 (1)	Courtney Buck	Submission (rear-naked choke)	WEC 47	March 6, 2010	1	2:39	Columbus, Ohio, United States	
NC	9–3 (1)	Cole Province	NC (overturned)	WEC 42	August 9, 2009	3	5:00	Las Vegas, Nevada, United States	Originally a split decision loss. Overturned to no contest when Province failed his post-fight drug test.
Loss	9–3	Wagnney Fabiano	Decision (unanimous)	WEC 40	April 5, 2009	3	5:00	Chicago, Illinois, United States	
Win	9–2	Mitch Coats	Submission	Knockout Promotions 2009	March 20, 2009	1	4:58	Boise, Idaho, United States	
Win	8–2	Thomas Denny	Submission (armbar)	GFC: Evolution	May 19, 2007	1	4:32	Columbus, Ohio, United States	
Win	7–2	Masakazu Imanari	Decision (majority)	Deep: 25 Impact	August 4, 2006	3	5:00	Tokyo, Japan	
Loss	6–2	Marcos Galvão	Decision	Jungle Fight 6	April 29, 2006	3		Manaus, Brazil	
Win	6–1	Mike French	Submission (armbar)	GFC: Team Gracie vs. Team Hammer House	March 3, 2006	2	0:42	Columbus, Ohio, United States	
Win	5–1	Miljan Djurasinovic	Submission (rear-naked choke)	Jungle Fight 5	November 26, 2005	1		Manaus, Brazil	
Win	4–1	Jean Robert Monier	Submission (rear-naked choke)	Jungle Fight 4	May 21, 2005	3		Manaus, Brazil	
Win	3–1	Fábio Mello	Decision (unanimous)	Jungle Fight 3	October 23, 2004	3	5:00	Manaus, Brazil	
Win	2–1	Andre Rodrigues	TKO	Papucaia Fight 1	September 11, 2004			Papucaia, Brazil	
Loss	1–1	Yoshiro Maeda	Decision (unanimous)	Pancrase: Brave 7	August 22, 2004	3	5:00	Osaka, Japan	
Win	1–0	Rani Yahya	Decision	Jungle Fight 2	May 15, 2004	3	5:00	Manaus, Brazil	

== See also ==
- List of Brazilian jiu-jitsu practitioners
