= Jungle Fight Europe =

Jungle Fight MMA events in 2006

- Promotion: Jungle Fight
- Date: December 17, 2006
- Venue: Tivoli Hall
- City: Ljubljana, Slovenia

Jungle Fight Europe, also known as Jungle Fight 7, was a mixed martial arts event held by Jungle Fight on December 17, 2006 at Tivoli Hall in Ljubljana, Slovenia. To date, it is the only Jungle Fight event outside of Brazil.

== Results ==
Main Card
Weight class				Method	Round	Time	Notes
	Ronaldo Souza	def.	Haim Gozali	Submission (Rear-Naked Choke)	1	1:33
	Assuério Silva	def.	Igor Pokrajac	Decision (Split)	3	5:00
	Antony Rea	def.	Rodrigo Gripp de Sousa	TKO (Punches)	1	0:00
	Danilo Rodaki	def.	Klemen Fister	Submission (Rear Naked Choke)	1	3:43
	Steve Cantwell	def.	Leonardo Pecanha	TKO (Doctor Stoppage)	3	2:32
	Dalibor Anastasov	def.	Richard Montgomery	Submission (Rear Naked Choke)	1	4:16
	Sasa Mucnjak	def.	Martin Boizik	TKO (Punches)	1	2:31

== See also ==
- 2006 in Jungle Fight
