= 2005 in Jungle Fight =

Information
- First date: May 21, 2005
- Last date: November 26, 2005

Events
- Total events: 2

Fights
- Total fights: 19

Chronology
2004 in Jungle Fight	2005 in Jungle Fight	2006 in Jungle Fight

The year 2005 is the third year in the history of Jungle Fight, a mixed martial arts promotion based in Brazil. In 2005 Jungle Fight held 2 events beginning with, Jungle Fight 4.

== Events list ==
#	Event title	Date	Arena	Location
5	Jungle Fight 5	November 26, 2005	Tropical Hotel	Manaus, Brazil
4	Jungle Fight 4	May 21, 2005	Tropical Hotel	Manaus, Brazil

== Jungle Fight 4 ==
Jungle Fight 4 was an event held on May 21, 2005, at The Tropical Hotel in Manaus, Amazonas, Brazil.

=== Results ===
Main Card
Weight class				Method	Round	Time	Notes
	Vladimir Matyushenko	def.	Carlos Barreto	TKO (Knee Injury)	1	0:26
	Leopoldo Montenegro	def.	Rodrigo Souza	Submission (Toe Hold)	1	2:24
	Jose Landi-Jons	def.	Fabricio Monteiro	KO (Punch)	2	3:30
	Chinzo Machida	def.	Cristiano Rosa	TKO (Soccer Kick and Punches)	1	1:40
	Fredson Paixao	def.	Jean Robert Monier	Submission (Rear-Naked Choke)	3	1:41
	Kassim Annan	def.	Marcos Valle	Submission (Rear Naked Choke)	2	4:04
	Jorge Patino	def.	Carlos Baruch	TKO (Punches)	2	3:57
	Helio Dipp Jr.	def.	Brent Beauparlant	KO (Knee)	1	1:18
	Marcus Sursa	def.	William Mattos	Submission (Rear-Naked Choke)	1	2:54

== Jungle Fight 5 ==
Jungle Fight 5 was an event held on November 26, 2005, at The Tropical Hotel in Manaus, Amazonas, Brazil.

=== Results ===
Main Card
Weight class				Method	Round	Time	Notes
	Jose Landi-Jons	def.	Alexander Shlemenko	N/A	3	5:00
	Evangelista Santos	def.	Michal Materla	KO (Punches)	2	1:23
	Fredson Paixao	def.	Miljan Djurasinovic	Submission (Rear Naked Choke)	1	0:00
	Edson Claas Vieira	def.	Helio Dipp Jr.	KO	1	0:15
	Alexandre Ferreira	def.	Julio Cezar Santana	Submission (Guillotine Choke)	1	0:52
	Miodrag Petkovic	def.	Alessandro Coelho	Submission (Guillotine Choke)	2	0:00
	Luciano Azevedo	def.	José Aldo	Submission (Rear-Naked Choke)	2	3:37
	Ivan Jorge	def.	Andrius Hubaldo	Decision	3	5:00
	Roberto Bispo Silva	def.	Sandro dos Santos	Submission (Choke)	2	0:00
