= Choi Mu-bae =

Korean wrestler and MMA fighter

- Born: June 27, 1970 (age 56); Busan, South Korea
- Native name: 최무배
- Other names: The Heavy Tank of Busan, Fuchinkan
- Nationality: South Korean
- Height: 190 cm (6 ft 3 in)
- Weight: 110.3 kg (243 lb; 17 st 5 lb)
- Division: Super Heavyweight; Heavyweight
- Style: MMA, Greco-Roman wrestling, Hybrid martial arts
- Team: Team Tackle; KPW Korea

Mixed martial arts record
- Total: 22
- Wins: 14
- By knockout: 8
- By submission: 4
- By decision: 2
- Losses: 8
- By knockout: 4
- By submission: 1
- By decision: 3

Other information
- Mixed martial arts record from Sherdog

Choi Mu-bae
Medal record

Men's Greco-Roman wrestling

Representing South Korea

1991 Asian Wrestling Championships
Bronze medal – third place	1991 Asian Wrestling Championships	100 kg

Choi Mu-bae (Korean: 최무배, born June 27, 1970), often anglicised to Mu-bae Choi, is a South Korean former Heavyweight Greco-Roman wrestler and professional mixed martial artist. A professional since 2004, he has competed for World Victory Road, the PRIDE Fighting Championships, K-1 Hero's, and Pancrase. He holds notable victories over UFC veterans Soa Palelei and Dave Herman.

== Mixed martial arts ==
Choi made his mixed martial arts debut in 2004 at Pride FC when he defeated Yusuke Imamura, who was also a former wrestler.

He has a professional MMA record of 11–4 as of May 2, 2015. Choi was scheduled to fight in K-1 Dynamite!! USA in Los Angeles against "Mighty" Mo Siliga on June 2, 2007. Choi however pulled out of the event for undisclosed reasons.

Choi debuted in Sengoku at the Sengoku 3 event on June 8, 2008, losing against the Brazilian fighter Marcio Cruz.

As for his Japanese-language nickname Fuchin-kan, Fuchin means "unsinkable", and Kan simultaneously means "warship" and "[South] Korea".

== Personal life ==
He was born in Busan, South Korea, on June 27, 1970.

== Mixed martial arts record ==
Professional record breakdown
22 matches	14 wins	8 losses
By knockout	8	4
By submission	4	1
By decision	2	3

Res.	Record	Opponent	Method	Event	Date	Round	Time	Location	Notes
Win	14–8	Hye Seok Son	KO (punch)	AFC 19	April 29, 2022	2	4:03	Seoul, South Korea	Won AFC Heavyweight Championship.
Loss	13–8	Kazuyuki Fujita	TKO (punches)	Road FC 050	November 3, 2018	1	1:55	Daejeon, South Korea	Openweight bout.
Win	13–7	Anding Ma	TKO (punches)	Road FC 049	August 18, 2018	1	4:09	Seoul, South Korea	
Loss	12–7	Jake Heun	Decision (unanimous)	Road FC 27	August 12, 2017	3	5:00	Wonju, Gangwon Province, South Korea	
Loss	12–6	Mighty Mo	TKO (punches)	Road FC 27	December 26, 2015	1	3:46	Shanghai, China	ROAD FC Openweight Tournament Quarterfinals.
Loss	12–5	Mighty Mo	KO (punch)	Road FC 26	October 9, 2015	1	0:37	Seoul, South Korea	
Win	12–4	Yusuke Kawaguchi	TKO (punches)	Road FC 24	July 25, 2015	2	4:50	Tokyo, Japan	
Win	11–4	Lucas Tani	TKO (punches)	Road FC 23	May 2, 2015	1	1:45	Seoul, South Korea	
Win	10–4	Toyohiko Monma	KO (punch)	Revolution 1: The Return of Legend	March 23, 2013	1	0:26	Seoul, South Korea	Openweight bout.
Loss	9–4	Yoshihiro Nakao	Decision (unanimous)	World Victory Road Presents: Sengoku 9	August 2, 2009	3	5:00	Saitama, Japan	
Win	9–3	Katsuhisa Fujii	Decision (unanimous)	Pancrase: Changing Tour 3	June 7, 2009	2	5:00	Tokyo, Japan	
Win	8–3	Dave Herman	TKO (punches)	World Victory Road Presents: Sengoku no Ran 2009	January 4, 2009	2	2:22	Saitama, Japan	
Loss	7–3	Márcio Cruz	Submission (triangle armbar)	World Victory Road Presents: Sengoku 3	June 8, 2008	1	4:37	Saitama, Japan	
Win	7–2	Gary Goodridge	KO (punch)	The Khan 1	March 30, 2008	2	N/A	Seoul, South Korea	
Win	6–2	Masayuki Kono	Technical Submission (arm-triangle choke)	Pancrase: Blow 10	December 12, 2006	2	1:36	Tokyo, Japan	
Loss	5–2	Sylvester Terkay	Decision (unanimous)	Hero's 2005 in Seoul	November 5, 2005	2	5:00	Seoul, South Korea	Openweight bout.
Loss	5–1	Sergei Kharitonov	TKO (punches and knees)	PRIDE 29	February 20, 2005	1	3:24	Saitama, Japan	
Win	5–0	Giant Silva	Submission (arm-triangle choke)	PRIDE Shockwave 2004	December 31, 2004	1	5:47	Saitama, Japan	Super Heavyweight bout; Mu-bae weighed in at 112.9 kg.
Win	4–0	Soa Palelei	Submission (rear-naked choke)	PRIDE 28	October 24, 2004	2	4:55	Saitama, Japan	
Win	3–0	Murad Ammaev	TKO (suplex and punches)	Gladiator FC: Day 2	June 27, 2004	1	0:18	Seoul, South Korea	
Win	2–0	Yoshihisa Yamamoto	Decision (unanimous)	PRIDE Bushido 3	May 23, 2004	2	5:00	Yokohama, Japan	
Win	1–0	Yusuke Imamura	Submission (rear-naked choke)	PRIDE Bushido 2	February 15, 2004	1	4:08	Yokohama, Japan	
