= Assuério Silva =

Brazilian boxer and mixed martial arts fighter

- Born: June 18, 1974 (age 52); Mossoró, Rio Grande do Norte, Brazil
- Height: 6 ft 1 in (1.85 m)
- Weight: 235 lb (107 kg; 16 st 11 lb)
- Division: Heavyweight
- Reach: 75 in (191 cm)
- Stance: Orthodox
- Fighting out of: Curitiba, Paraná, Brazil
- Team: Black House; Chute Boxe Academy; CM System; Total Punch MMA Academy
- Rank: Brown belt in Brazilian Jiu-Jitsu; Black belt in Shotokan; Black and red kruang in Muay Thai; Black and white praijed in Muay Thai; Black belt in Kickboxing; Black belt in Full-contact Karate
- Years active: 1997–2009

Professional boxing record
- Total: 1
- Wins: 1
- By knockout: 1
- Losses: 0
- Draws: 0

Mixed martial arts record
- Total: 25
- Wins: 16
- By knockout: 7
- By submission: 7
- By decision: 2
- Losses: 8
- By knockout: 3
- By submission: 2
- By decision: 3
- No contests: 1

Other information
- Boxing record from BoxRec
- Mixed martial arts record from Sherdog

Assuério Silva (born June 18, 1974) is a Brazilian mixed martial artist and professional boxer, having competed in the Ultimate Fighting Championship and Pancrase. He became the Heavyweight King of Pancrase on May 30, 2007, defeating Tatsuya Mizuno.

== Mixed martial arts career ==
Silva holds a professional fight record of 15–8–0^{1}, the majority of his wins coming via submission. He fought three times in Pride FC in 2001, winning twice. However, after signing a three-fight contract with UFC, he was less successful, losing all his fights to Tim Sylvia, Brandon Vera and Cheick Kongo.

His height is 6 ft 1 in and he weighs 241 pounds. In addition to training Muay Thai, he holds a black belt in karate. Silva is also a Black Belt in Jiu Jitsu under Cristiano Marcello. He fights out of Curitiba, Brazil with Total Punch Mixed Martial Arts Academy.

Silva bounced back from a loss to Cheick Kongo by becoming the King of Pancrase after a 2nd-round TKO win over Tatsuya Mizuno. He won this vacated title at Pancrase Rising 6 last 30 May 2007. He was scheduled to defend the championship against the former champion, Kestutis "Tiger" Arbocius, on 14 October 2007 at the Differ Ariake Arena in Tokyo, Japan, but Arbocius no-showed at the event. Shortly thereafter, Silva vacated the Championship to pursue a contract with the newly formed Hardcore Fighting Championships in Canada. However, the organization folded before he was able to fight once under their banner.

Silva made his professional boxing debut on June 21, 2008, in his native Curitiba, Brazil, knocking out Adriano Vicente in 38 seconds of the 1st round.

== Shooting incident ==
Silva was shot on the evening of January 29, 2013, outside his gym in Curitiba, Brazil, according to a report from Brazilian news outlet Parana Online. Silva was allegedly shot five times by a former associate, whom Silva reportedly identified as Robson Freitas. Silva was reportedly taken to a local hospital and was in serious condition for a period of time.

== Championships and accomplishments ==
=== Mixed martial arts ===
- Pancrase Hybrid Wrestling
  - Pancrase Heavyweight Championship (One time; Last)

== Mixed martial arts record ==
Professional record breakdown
25 matches	16 wins	8 losses
By knockout	7	3
By submission	7	2
By decision	2	3
No contests	1	

Res.	Record	Opponent	Method	Event	Date	Round	Time	Location	Notes
Loss	16–8 (1)	Geronimo dos Santos	KO (punches)	Jungle Fight 16	October 17, 2009	1	1:01	Rio de Janeiro, Brazil	
Win	16–7 (1)	Dave Anderton	Submission (guillotine choke)	Boa Vista Combat Show	August 30, 2009	1	0:53	Boa Vista, Brazil	
Loss	15–7 (1)	Todd Duffee	TKO (punches)	Jungle Fight 11	September 13, 2008	2	1:17	Rio de Janeiro, Brazil	
Win	15–6 (1)	Terroll Dees	Submission (kneebar)	Jungle Fight 10	July 12, 2008	1	1:42	Rio de Janeiro, Brazil	
Win	14–6 (1)	Tatsuya Mizuno	TKO (punches)	Pancrase: Rising 5	May 30, 2007	2	2:08	Tokyo, Japan	Won the vacant Pancrase Heavyweight Championship.
Loss	13–6 (1)	Cheick Kongo	Decision (majority)	UFC 70	April 21, 2007	3	5:00	Manchester, United Kingdom	
Win	13–5 (1)	Igor Pokrajac	Decision (split)	Jungle Fight Europe	December 17, 2006	3	5:00	Ljubljana, Slovenia	
Win	12–5 (1)	Eduardo Maiorino	TKO (punches)	Show Fight 5	November 9, 2006	1	N/A	São Paulo, Brazil	
Loss	11–5 (1)	Brandon Vera	Submission (guillotine choke)	UFC 60: Hughes vs. Gracie	May 27, 2006	1	2:39	Los Angeles, United States	
Loss	11–4 (1)	Tim Sylvia	Decision (unanimous)	UFC Fight Night 3	January 16, 2006	3	5:00	Las Vegas, United States	
Win	11–3 (1)	Alessio Sakara	Decision (unanimous)	Jungle Fight 3	October 23, 2004	3	5:00	Manaus, Brazil	
Win	10–3 (1)	Fabiano Scherner	Submission (guillotine choke)	Jungle Fight 2	May 15, 2004	2	1:00	Manaus, Brazil	
Loss	9–3 (1)	Alexander Emelianenko	Decision (split)	Pride Bushido 1	October 5, 2003	2	5:00	Saitama, Japan	
NC	9–2 (1)	Fabiano Scherner	No Contest (injury)	Meca World Vale Tudo 9	August 1, 2003	3	1:24	Rio de Janeiro, Brazil	Scherner injured falling from ring.
Win	9–2	Yoshihisa Yamamoto	TKO (punches)	Pride 16	September 24, 2001	1	0:11	Osaka, Japan	
Win	8–2	Valentijn Overeem	Submission (heel hook)	Pride 15	July 29, 2001	1	2:50	Saitama, Japan	
Win	7–2	Walter Farias	KO (head kick)	Meca World Vale Tudo 5	June 9, 2001	1	5:00	Curitiba, Brazil	
Win	6–2	Pedro Otavio	Submission (strikes)	Meca World Vale Tudo 4	December 16, 2000	2	2:00	Curitiba, Brazil	
Win	5–2	Rodrigo Mamute	Submission (punches and stomp)	Meca World Vale Tudo 2	August 12, 2000	1	4:27	Curitiba, Brazil	
Win	4–2	Luis Alberto	Submission	Desafio: BadBoy de ValeTudo 2	November 20, 1999	N/A	N/A	Ceará, Brazil	
Win	3–2	Leopoldo Serao	KO	Desafio: BadBoy de ValeTudo 2	November 20, 1999	N/A	N/A	Ceará, Brazil	
Win	2–2	Romildo Romialdo	Submission (rear-naked choke)	MOVT 2: Mossoro Open de Vale Tudo 2	March 25, 1999	1	N/A	Mossoro, Brazil	
Loss	1–2	Mikhail Avetisyan	TKO (cut)	World Vale Tudo Championship 7	February 2, 1999	1	8:58	Brazil	
Win	1–1	Waldir dos Anjos	Submission (rear naked choke)	BVF 12: Circuito Brasileiro de Vale Tudo 4	November 18, 1998	1	11:07	Brazil	
Loss	0–1	Charles Gracie	Submission (triangle choke)	Extremo Combate Bahia Open	July 7, 1997	1	1:01	Salvador, Brazil	
