= Giant Silva =

Brazilian basketball player, mixed martial artist and professional wrestler

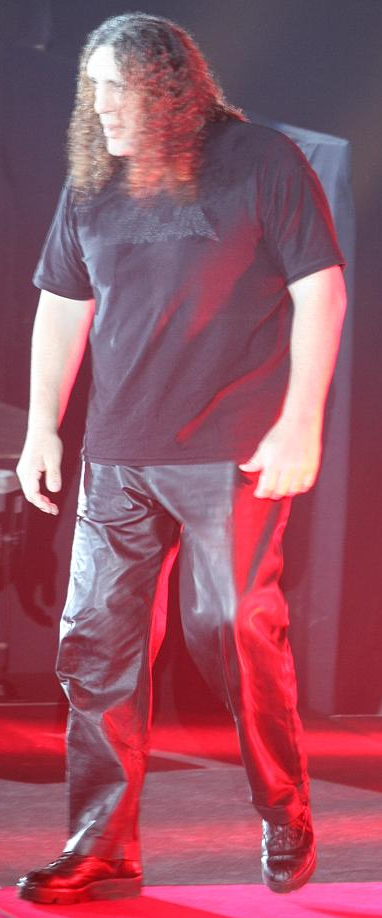
- Silva in 2008.

Personal information
- Born: Paulo César da Silva; July 21, 1963 (age 63) São Paulo, São Paulo, Brazil

Professional wrestling career
- Ring name(s): Giant King; Giant Silva; Gigante Silva; The Great Charlie; The New Giant; Paulão
- Billed height: 7 ft 2 in (218 cm)
- Billed weight: 385 lb (175 kg)
- Trained by: Dory Funk Jr. Tom Prichard
- Debut: 1998
- Retired: 2010

Paulo César da Silva (born July 21, 1963) is a Brazilian former national basketball player for the Brazilian national basketball team and later mixed martial artist and professional wrestler, better known by his ring name Giant Silva. He stands 2.18 m (7 ft 2 in) and weighs 175 kg (386 lb). A super-heavyweight wrestler, he was both a face and a heel in several professional wrestling promotions. Known for his great height, in 2014 he was described as the sixth tallest professional wrestler in history.

== Basketball career ==
In the 1980s, Silva was originally a professional basketball player. He played with the senior Brazilian national basketball team at the 1988 Summer Olympics with the nickname "Paulão" (Big Paulo). Very much like El Gigante, who also started as a basketball player, the 7 ft 2 in (218 cm) tall Silva played as a reserve center on Brazil's national team, wearing the #13 jersey.

== Professional wrestling career ==
=== World Wrestling Federation (1998–1999) ===
After turning pro in late 1997, Silva signed with World Wrestling Federation. After debuting he was given the name: "Giant Silva" and was a member of the Oddities stable. For most of his WWF tenure, Silva was a cornerman for the Oddities and his matches on TV were tag matches, teaming up with Golga and/or Kurrgan. His only highlight was at SummerSlam 1998 when he, Golga, and Kurrgan defeated Kai En Tai in a 3 on 4 Handicap match. During his time in WWF, Silva was not used as much. Silva was released around February 1999.

He would return only once with long hair on the July 4, 1999 episode of WWF Super Astros in a victory over Pantera.

=== Consejo Mundial de Lucha Libre (1999–2003) ===
After his WWF tenure, Silva joined Mexican promotion Consejo Mundial de Lucha Libre and was renamed Gigante Silva. He was introduced by midget wrestler Tzuki and soon became an ally to tecnicos, often teaming up in tag team matches against numerically superior rudos. Silva struck an occasional team with fellow superheavyweight Brazo de Plata and had part in a feud with Gigante Kurggan, who was brought by Los Capos (the faction led by Apolo Dantes and Universo 2000) in order to oppose him. In November 2003, Silva turned rudo himself and allied with Pierroth Jr. and his valet La Comandante before leaving Mexico for Japan full time.

=== New Japan Pro-Wrestling and Hustle (2001–2008) ===
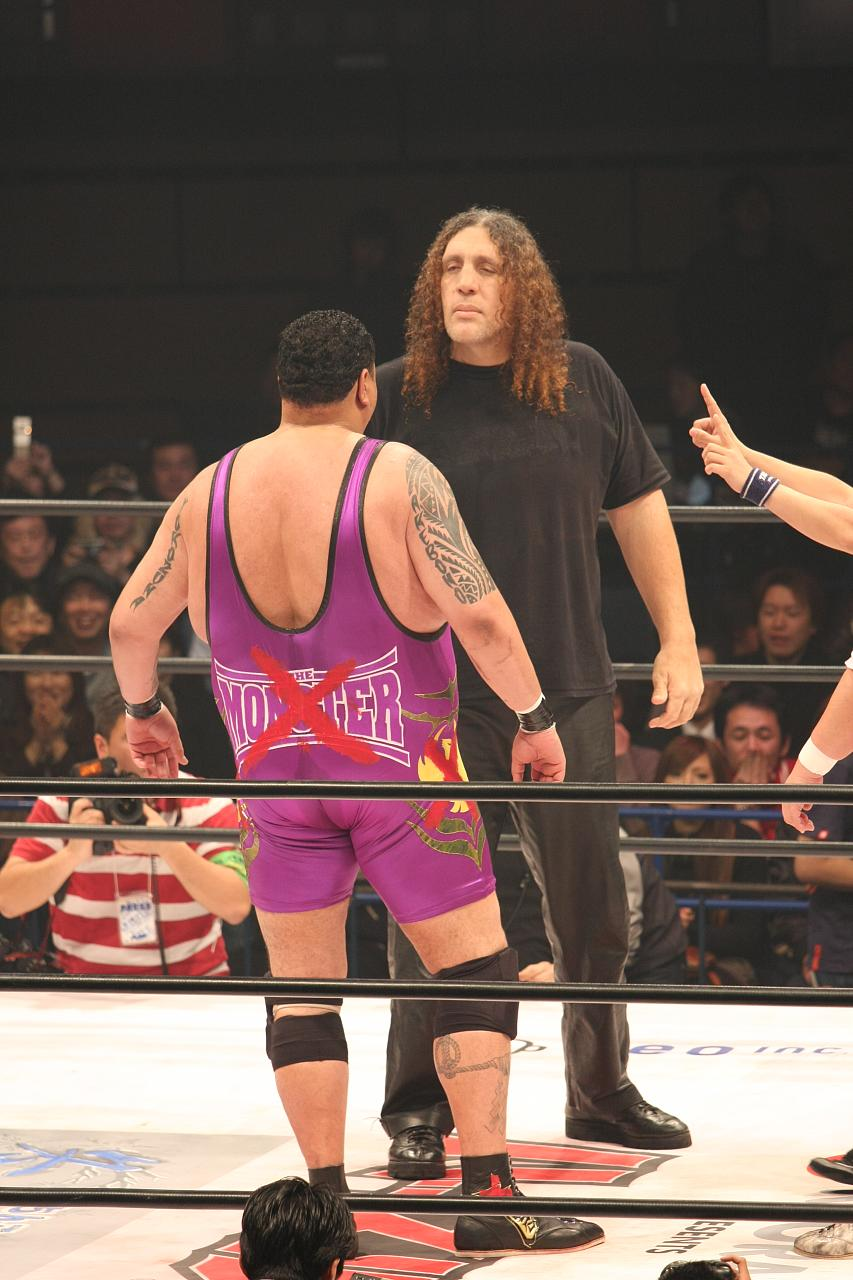
Silva in a match against Bono-chan.

In 2001, Silva joined New Japan Pro-Wrestling. He originally debuted on August 12, 2001, as a member of Masahiro Chono's stable: Team 2000 where he was paired up with another Giant: Giant Singh (better known as The Great Khali) as the tag team: Club 7. Silva made his in-ring debut for New Japan when he took part in the G1 World Climax tournament where he finished in 4th place with 4 points. He and Singh made their debut as a tag team at Indicate of Next on October 8, 2001, where they defeated Hiroshi Tanahashi, Kenzo Suzuki, Yutaka Yoshie, & Wataru Inoue in a 4 on 2 handicap match.

In the fall of 2001, Silva teamed with Chono in the 2001 G1 Tag League with the team finishing in 7th place with 6 points. In 2002, Silva took part in several tournaments. In February he was part of the a tournament for the vacated IWGP Heavyweight Championship but lost in the first round to eventual winner: Tadao Yasuda. Two days later on February 3, Silva, Singh, and Chono won the Teisen Hall Cup 6 Man Tag Team Tournament. In March, Club 7 then entered a tournament for the vacated IWGP Tag Team Championship. In the first round, they defeated fellow Team 2000 members: Scott Norton and Super J, but lost to Yuji Nagata and Manabu Nakanishi in the semi-finals.

In the spring of 2002, Club 7 broke up and began feuding shortly afterwards. The two were scheduled to face each other at Toukon Memorial Day on May 2, 2002, but an injury to Singh prevented the match from taking place. The two finally fought at Cross Road on August 29, 2002, with Silva defeating Singh.

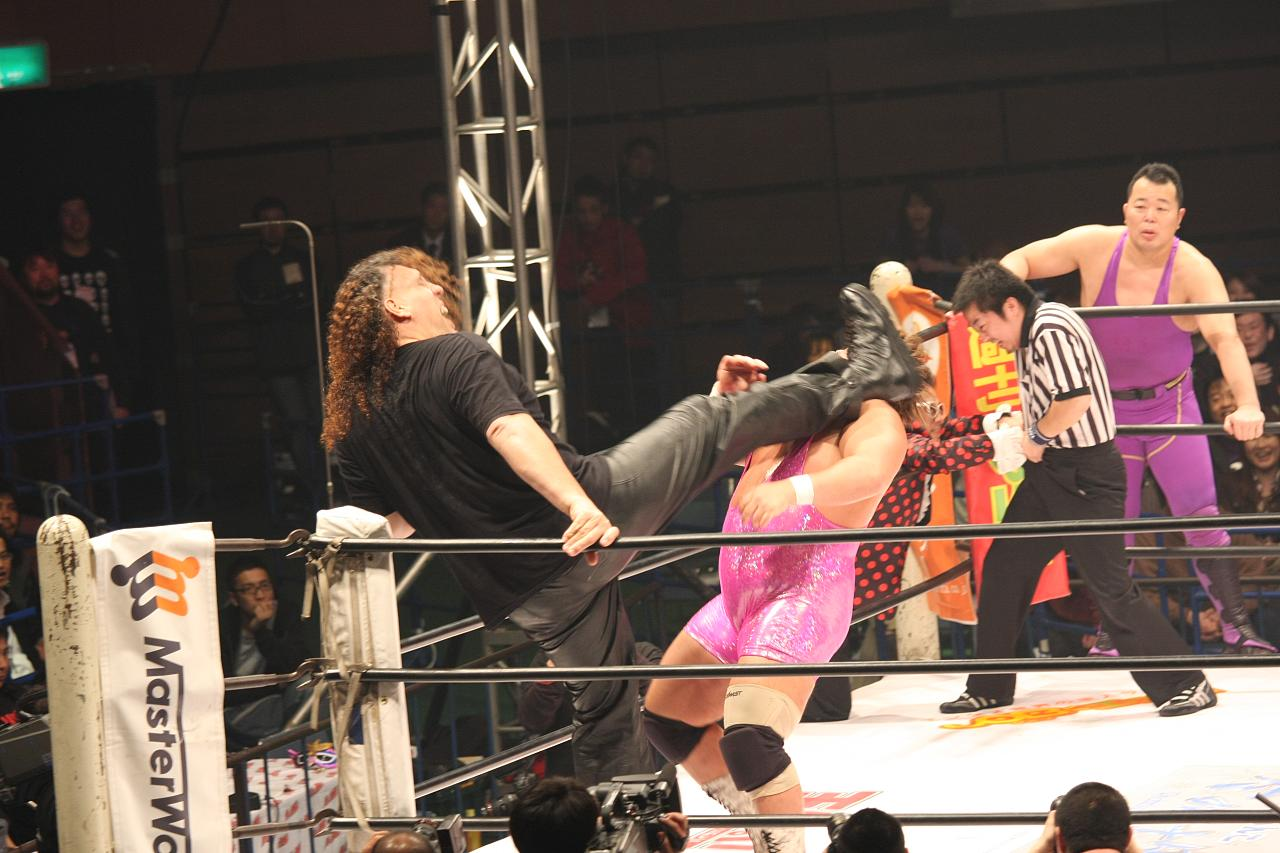
Silva performing a big boot to Yoshie-chan.

From 2004 to 2008, Silva wrestled for HUSTLE where he took part in a variety of matches and formed teams with Scott Norton, Toshiaki Kawada, and Mark Coleman.

=== Later career (2008–2010) ===
Silva also competed in National Wrestling Superstars mainly working in handicap matches.

== Mixed martial arts career ==
=== Pride Fighting Championships (2003–2006) ===
After his career in NJPW, Silva was signed by Dream Stage Entertainment and competed in Pride Fighting Championships, a defunct mixed martial arts organization based in Japan. Although at one time he trained with members of the Gracie family, most notably Ricardo Gracie and Ralek Gracie, he only had a crash course in Brazilian jiu-jitsu when he had his debut at Pride Shockwave 2003 against 250lbs Heath Herring. Silva led the more experienced fighter to the third round, absorbing repeated leg kicks and taking Herring down once, but Heath capitalized and reversed it into a rear naked choke for the win.

In April 2004, Silva took part in the Heavyweight Grand Prix tournament, whose first round saw him facing sumo wrestler Henry "Sentoryu" Miller, only 85lbs lighter. Sentoryu accomplished a takedown on Silva and attacked his guard, only for Silva's height to neutralize his ground and pound attempts, as the sumo wrestler could not reach his head. Miller finally got side control, but then Silva reversed him with a Kimura lock and made him tap out. The pro wrestler then advanced to the second round, being pitted against former world judo champion Naoya Ogawa, who won the fight by ground and pound TKO.

Silva would then face another professional wrestler, Pro Wrestling NOAH's Takashi Sugiura, who used his wrestling acumen to take Silva down and land knees and punches for the stoppage. The match had some controversy, as a brawl erupted after the bout and Silva had to be restrained by several ring crew men.

On December 31, 2006, Giant Silva finally faced a heavier opponent, the former yokozuna Akebono Tarō, at K-1 Premium 2006. The sumo wrestler clinched Silva and pressed him against the ropes, until Silva broke the hug and transitioned to a Kimura lock on the ground, submitting Akebono for his second and last win.

== Mixed martial arts record ==
Professional record breakdown
| 8 matches | 2 wins | 6 losses |
| By knockout | 0 | 4 |
| By submission | 2 | 2 |

| Res. | Record | Opponent | Method | Event | Date | Round | Time | Location | Notes |
|---|---|---|---|---|---|---|---|---|---|
| Win | 2–6 | Akebono Taro | Submission (kimura) | K-1 PREMIUM 2006 Dynamite!! | December 31, 2006 | 1 | 1:02 | Osaka, Japan | |
| Loss | 1–6 | Ikuhisa Minowa | TKO (knees) | Pride – Bushido 10 | April 2, 2006 | 1 | 2:33 | Tokyo, Japan | |
| Loss | 1–5 | James Thompson | TKO (soccer kicks) | PRIDE Shockwave 2005 | December 31, 2005 | 1 | 1:28 | Saitama, Japan | |
| Loss | 1–4 | Choi Mu-Bae | Submission (arm-triangle choke) | PRIDE Shockwave 2004 | December 31, 2004 | 1 | 5:47 | Saitama, Japan | |
| Loss | 1–3 | Takashi Sugiura | TKO (punches) | PRIDE Bushido 4 | July 19, 2004 | 1 | 2:35 | Nagoya, Japan | |
| Loss | 1–2 | Naoya Ogawa | TKO (punches) | PRIDE Critical Countdown 2004 | June 20, 2004 | 1 | 3:29 | Saitama, Japan | |
| Win | 1–1 | Henry Miller | Submission (kimura) | PRIDE Total Elimination 2004 | April 25, 2004 | 1 | 4:04 | Saitama, Japan | |
| Loss | 0–1 | Heath Herring | Submission (rear-naked choke) | PRIDE Shockwave 2003 | December 31, 2003 | 3 | 0:35 | Saitama, Japan | |

== Championships and accomplishments ==
- Consejo Mundial de Lucha Libre
  - Torneo de Trios (2001) – with La Fiera
- New Japan Pro-Wrestling
  - Teisen Hall Six-Man Tournament (2002) – with Masahiro Chono and Giant Singh
