= Kingdom Professional Wrestling =

Japanese professional wrestling promotion

- Founded: March 1997
- Defunct: March 1998
- Style: Shoot style, mixed martial arts
- Headquarters: Tokyo, Japan
- Founder: Former UWFi wrestlers
- Predecessor: UWF International
- Successor: Pride Fighting Championships; Kingdom Ehrgeiz

Kingdom, or Kingdom Professional Wrestling, was a Japanese shoot-style professional wrestling promotion that held events in 1997 and 1998. It was considered a continuation of UWF International, having most of its former roster: Nobuhiko Takada, Yoji Anjo, Kazushi Sakuraba, Daijiro Matsui, Naoki Sano, Masahito Kakihara, Yoshihiro Takayama, Kenichi Yamamoto and Hiromitsu Kanehara.

Kingdom further developed the realistic approach to shoot-style professional wrestling, incorporating open-fingered gloves, ground-and-pound, and other mixed martial arts-inspired techniques into its matches. While the promotion primarily presented shoot wrestling, some matches were conducted as legitimate shoot fights, further blurring the distinction between professional wrestling and mixed martial arts. This approach reflected the growing popularity of mixed martial arts in Japan during the late 1990s and helped establish Kingdom as a transitional promotion between the shoot-style wrestling scene and the emerging Japanese MMA scene. Despite this, Kingdom was largely unsuccessful and folded in 1998.

Several wrestlers began pursuing mixed martial arts during their time at the promotion, most notably Kazushi Sakuraba who won the UFC Japan: Ultimate Japan heavyweight tournament representing Kingdom. The promotion is also a predecessor to the Pride Fighting Championships, which held their first event towards the demise of Kingdom. With the rise of mixed martial arts, Kingdom also held legitimate shoot fights in their events.

== History ==
The promotion was founded in March 1997 as a successor to the UWF International, which closed down on December 1996. Kingdom featured much of UWF International's former roster and continued its shoot-style wrestling format, while incorporating elements of mixed martial arts (MMA) into its presentation.

The former Ace of the UWFi, Nobuhiko Takada, joined Kingdom only for a single match in their innaugural show Kingdom Birth Step 1 on May 1997 against Ryuki Ueyama, ending in a draw. Afterwards, Takada didn't continue on Kingdom and went to focus on his match against Rickson Gracie, scheduled for October 11 of that year.

The Ultimate Fighting Championship (UFC), at the time with financial issues, attempted to expand into the Japanese market by partnering with Kingdom. The resulting event was UFC Japan: Ultimate Japan. Hiromitsu Kanehara and Yoji Anjo signed to represent Kingdom in the tournament, but Kanehara injured himself in training and Kazushi Sakuraba was sent as a substitute. Lying about his weight (resulting in 60 lb of difference), he fought Brazilian jiu-jitsu black belt Marcus "Conan" Silveira twice and defeated him with an arm bar, this victory propelled Sakuraba's fame and would lead him to become a mainstay at PRIDE.

Kingdom's popularity did not reach or surpass that of the UWF International. Attempts to rectify this by using talent from other shoot-style promotions including Battlarts did little to help, and it seemed that in the eyes of the Japanese fans the era of shoot style wrestling had ended. As a result, Kingdom would go out of business in March 1998.

In the aftermath, Matsui, Sakuraba, Sano and Takada focused on competing for mixed martial arts promotion PRIDE as part of the Takada Dojo camp. Yamamoto and Kanehara jumped to Fighting Network Rings, which had been a splinter promotion formed from the UWF much like UWF International had been. Meanwhile, Kakihara and Takayama joined All Japan Pro Wrestling as free agents, while Anjo dabbled in K-1 before later reappearing in All Japan Pro Wrestling and Dream Stage Entertainment's Hustle as "Commander Anjoe".

A former trainee of the Kingdom dojo, Hidetada Irie, who debuted at Kingdom's final event, formed a successor promotion called "Kingdom Ehrgeiz", with himself as the top star. The promotion still exists, however, is very obscure and only promotes cards periodically.

== See also ==
- Professional wrestling in Japan
