= Daijiro Matsui =

Japanese professional wrestler and mixed martial arts fighter

Daijiro Matsui 松井大二郎
- Born: December 5, 1972 (age 53); Mabi, Okayama, Japan
- Other names: Honoo no Grappler ("The Flame Grappler")
- Nationality: Japanese
- Height: 1.75 m (5 ft 9 in)
- Weight: 84 kg (185 lb; 13.2 st)
- Division: Light Heavyweight; Middleweight
- Style: Shoot wrestling, judo, hybrid martial arts
- Fighting out of: Tokyo, Japan
- Team: Takada Dojo (formerly)
- Teacher: Nobuhiko Takada
- Rank: Black belt in Judo
- Years active: 1998-2002, 2004-2013, 2016-2017

Mixed martial arts record
- Total: 54
- Wins: 16
- By knockout: 2
- By submission: 1
- By decision: 9
- By disqualification: 2
- Unknown: 2
- Losses: 31
- By knockout: 8
- By submission: 3
- By decision: 19
- Unknown: 1
- Draws: 7

Other information
- Mixed martial arts record from Sherdog

Daijiro Matsui (Japanese: 松井 大二郎, Matsui Daijirō; born December 5, 1972 in Okayama) is a Japanese mixed martial artist and professional wrestler. A professional MMA competitor since 1998, he has competed for the PRIDE Fighting Championships, Cage Rage, DEEP, Pancrase, and King of the Cage. As a professional wrestler, Matsui has wrestled for UWF International, Battlarts, New Japan Pro Wrestling, Inoki Genome Federation and most recently GLEAT.

A former longtime training partner of Kazushi Sakuraba, Matsui is known for his toughness, conditioning, wrestling prowess and unorthodox offense. Despite his mixed success, he holds notable victories over former UFC Light Heavyweight Champion Quinton Jackson, former BAMMA World Middleweight Champion Tom Watson, former world kickboxing champion Jose Landi-Jons, BJJ black belt Rory Singer, and a draw against former Pancrase Light Heavyweight Champion and ADCC gold medallist Sanae Kikuta.

== Professional wrestling career ==
After training in judo and amateur wrestling at the International Budo University, Matsui joined shoot-style organization Union of Wrestling Forces International, where he trained under the legendary Nobuhiko Takada. He debuted in September 1996 as "Shunsuke Matsui" against Tatsunori Kamiyama, but he couldn't advance up the card as UWFi folded the same year. Matsui then followed the company's members to the new promotion Kingdom, having matches against Kazushi Sakuraba, Yoshihiro Takayama and Hiromitsu Kanehara, until Kingdom fell in 1998. He then transitioned to MMA.

In December 2000, Matsui made a return to pro wrestling at the Inoki Bom-Ba-Ye event, teaming with The Great Sasuke to defeat Akira Shoji and Caol Uno. He also competed in Battlarts, beating Ikuto Hidaka, and in New Japan Pro-Wrestling, wrestling Kendo Kashin in a losing effort for the IWGP Junior Heavyweight Championship. The same year, he faced Kashin again in All Japan Pro Wrestling, wrestling under the name of "Mr. Problem" and wearing modified Kendo Kashin attire and mask. Matsui had also stints in Pro Wrestling Zero1 and in Inoki Genome Federation.

== Mixed martial arts career ==
=== Early career ===
Matsui transitioned to mixed martial arts from pro wrestling and trained at the Takada Dojo for much of his career along with Kazushi Sakuraba. Matsui made himself known for a surprising technical ability and his unorthodox striking, including the use of the shoulder strike from the guard, as well as forward rolls and cartwheel kicks in an attempt to draw his opponents to the ground. He had his first taste of mixed martial arts when he faced American fighter Wayne Haas in a shoot fight for Kingdom in 1997. Matsui won the fight by decision.

=== PRIDE ===
Matsui made his true professional mixed martial arts debut in 1998 at PRIDE 3 against Akira "Mr. Pride" Shoji and the bout ended in a draw. In his next bout at PRIDE 4, he faced future Pancrase Light Heavyweight Champion Sanae Kikuta. This bout also ended in a draw because of the time-limit on bouts in the organization at that time.

At PRIDE 6, Matsui fought against future UFC Welterweight Champion and fan-favorite, Carlos Newton. In an entertaining fight, Matsui fended off increasingly difficult submission attempts from the Brazilian jiu-jitsu specialist and struck when possible, including a notable haymaker exchange at the end of the bout. However, Newton's superior control lost the fight by decision, handing the Japanese fighter his first professional loss via unanimous decision. Matsui fought again at PRIDE 7 against Dutch kickboxer "Dirty" Bob Schrijber, in a fight in which he performed impressively, holding his own against the striker and taking advantage of his superior wrestling skills. Controversy ensued when Matsui was punched in his face while being attended to by the referee because of a problem with his gloves. The two fighters exchanged heated words had to be prevented from brawling before the fight was continued. Matsui continued with renovated aggressivity, performing a takedown attempt which made Schrijber fall through the ropes and brutally land on a table ringside. Well after the bell marking the end of the first round sounded, Schrijber landed a powerful kick to the back of Matsui, who was still down on the ground. The foul immediately resulted in a disqualification win for Matsui, and the first win of his career.

Matsui's next appearance for the organization was at PRIDE 8 where he faced future Pride Middleweight Champion and future PRIDE 2003 Middleweight Grand Prix Tournament Champion, Wanderlei Silva. Outweighed and outmatched from the beginning of the fight, Matsui was rocked with a series of knees from the clinch and punches from Silva, but he demonstrated his heart and continued to battle despite bleeding profusely, even managing to put Silva on his back and land some strikes from the guard, leaving Silva's right eye swollen. He ultimately lost in a unanimous decision, but he passed to history as one of the few opponents Silva wasn't able to finish, including Matsui's own partner Kazushi Sakuraba. However, Matsui then fought against Ukrainian kickboxer Igor Vovchanchyn at PRIDE 9, and he was finished the first time in his career after the referee called a stop to the bout at 5:03 into the first round by an eye cut. Matsui's next bout for the organization was at PRIDE 10 against former UFC 12 Heavyweight Tournament Champion and future UFC Light Heavyweight Champion, Vitor "The Phenom" Belfort. Matsui was handed his third consecutive loss, via unanimous decision.

Matsui returned to PRIDE at PRIDE 14 to fight Brazilian Vale Tudo legend Jose "Pele" Landi-Jons, Matsui being a heavy underdog heading into the fight with a 2-6-2 record. Daijiro started the fight countering a flying knee by catching Pelé mid-air with a front kick, but then he was almost rendered unconscious by another knee strike when he was shooting for a takedown. The Japanese had his back taken with a body triangle, but he recovered from the knee and started countering Pele's submission attempts through sheer heart, driving the Brazilian against the turnbuckle in full runs to fend off rear-naked chokes and dropping him on his head to escape from armbars. Frustrated by his opponent's resistance, Pele landed a series of illegal elbows to the back of Matsui, resulting in a yellow card from the referee which attracted heated words. After the fight was restarted, Matsui took Pelé down and proceeded to attack his guard with ground and pound, throwing shoulder strikes and knees to the tailbone whenever he couldn't throw punches, and also holding Landi-Jons's head and slamming it against the canvas. Through the fight, Matsui's superior wrestling and unorthodox strikes paid off, and he kept control over Pelé while landing consistent punishment from his guard; he also got pops by throwing pro wrestling dropkicks every time the fight went standing. After the match, the judges ruled it a unanimous decision for Matsui, who pulled off one of the biggest upsets in the sport at the time.

Although Daijiro had challenged Wanderlei Silva to a rematch, his next opponent ended up being Ebenezer Fontes Braga at PRIDE 15 and Matsui lost via unanimous decision. In his next bout at PRIDE 16, Matsui faced the future EliteXC Middleweight Champion, Murilo "Ninja" Rua. Matsui was rocked with many stomps and soccer kicks throughout the bout, and the fight was eventually stopped in the beginning of the third round.

Matsui then fought against future UFC Light Heavyweight Champion Quinton "Rampage" Jackson at Pride 18 and Matsui won via disqualification after he was hit in the groin in the beginning of the fight. Matsui then fought Rodrigo Gracie at PRIDE 19 and lost via guillotine choke submission in the third round. The submission was controversial as Gracie held onto the choke for a significantly long time after Matsui had tapped out. Matsui's next appearance was at PRIDE Shockwave against Dutch kickboxer Jerrel Venetiaan. Matsui lost the bout via split decision after Venetiaan was able to utilize superior striking, especially with powerful kicks. Matsui then fought Rory Singer at PRIDE The Best Vol. 3 and won via unanimous decision, and then followed this up with another unanimous decision win over Kazuki Okubo at PRIDE 24, which would be Matsui's last appearance for the organization.

In March 2006, Matsui left Takada Dojo along with Kazushi Sakuraba, though Matsui remained in the team as a trainer.

=== Post-PRIDE ===
Matsui's next bout was two years later against Ryo Chonan in the DEEP organization and lost in a majority decision before going 0-2-1 in his next three bouts against the likes of Paulo Filho, Brian Foster, and Elvis Sinosic, respectively. In the Pancrase 2005 Neo-Blood Tournament Finals, Matsui picked up his first win in three years with a TKO over Daisuke Watanbe. To date, this is the only TKO/KO win of his career.

=== Cage Rage ===
Matsui made his debut for the England-based Cage Rage organization a year later against former Alex Reid and fought to a draw. In his next bout, Matsui faced former UFC veteran Curtis Stout and won via majority decision. Matsui then lost three consecutive bouts before defeating future BAMMA Middleweight Champion and current UFC veteran, Tom "Kong" Watson with an armbar submission, the only submission win of Matsui's career to date. Matsui lost his last fight for the organization against Mark Weir.

=== Other ventures ===
Since the demise of the Cage Rage organization, Matsui has exclusively fought in Japan, mostly for the DEEP organization. However, he has struggled, going 3-11-2 in his last 16 fights.

== Mixed martial arts record ==
Professional record breakdown
54 matches	16 wins	31 losses
By knockout	3	9
By submission	1	3
By decision	10	19
By disqualification	2	0
Draws	7	

Res.	Record	Opponent	Method	Event	Date	Round	Time	Location	Notes
Loss	16–31–7	Young Choi	TKO (punches)	DEEP: Osaka Impact 2021	April 4, 2021	1	1:29	Osaka, Japan	
Loss	16–30–7	Hiroki Tanaka	Decision (unanimous)	DXFC: Demolition Xtreme Fighting Championship	December 17, 2017	3	5:00	Osaka, Japan	
Loss	16–29–7	Dae Hwan Kim	KO (punch)	Wardog Cage Fight 15	October 29, 2017	1	1:51	Osaka, Japan	For the vacant WCF Middleweight Championship.
Win	16-28-7	Genya Waku	Decision (unanimous)	WCF: War Dog Cage Fight	April 29, 2017	2	5:00	Osaka, Japan	
Win	15–28-7	Koji Yamade	Decision (unanimous)	Hoost Cup - Kings Osaka	October 2, 2016	2	5:00	Osaka, Japan	
Win	14–28-7	Tetsuo Kondo	KO (punch)	ACF 23: Kakutogi no Omochabako	July 31, 2016	1	0:17	Osaka, Japan	
Draw	13-28-7	Tomoya Suzuki	Draw	Wardog Cage Fight 10	June 26, 2016	2	5:00	Osaka, Japan	
Win	13–28–6	Hideaki Sumi	TKO (punches)	Wardog Cage Fight 9	April 29, 2016	1	3:30	Osaka, Japan	
Loss	12–28–6	Toshikazu Suzuki	Decision (unanimous)	Grabaka: Grabaka Live! 3	October 27, 2013	2	5:00	Tokyo, Japan	
Loss	12–27–6	Kazuhiro Nakamura	KO (knee & punches)	DEEP: King Kaz Fight in Fukuyama	June 30, 2013	1	1:30	Fukuyama, Japan	90 kg bout.
Loss	12–26–6	Keiichiro Yamamiya	Decision (points)	U-Spirits: U-Spirits Again	March 9, 2013	1	15:00	Tokyo, Japan	
Loss	12–25–6	Eiji Ishikawa	Decision (unanimous)	Grabaka: Grabaka Live! 2	October 27, 2012	2	5:00	Tokyo, Japan	
Draw	12–24–6	Hiromitsu Kanehara	Draw (majority)	DEEP: 57 Impact	February 18, 2012	2	5:00	Tokyo, Japan	Light Heavyweight bout.
Draw	12–24–5	Hiroki Ozaki	Draw	DEEP: Tokyo Impact 2	June 5, 2011	2	5:00	Tokyo, Japan	
Win	12–24–4	Tomoaki Hata	Decision (unanimous)	DEEP: Cage Impact 2010 in Hamamatsu	September 19, 2010	2	5:00	Hamamatsu, Japan	
Loss	11–24–4	Dool Hee Lee	Decision (split)	Gladiator FC 6	April 25, 2010	2	5:00	Kobe, Hyogo, Japan	
Win	11–23–4	Il Chul Park	Decision (split)	Gladiator FC: Japan-Korea International Friendship Rally	November 3, 2009	2	5:00	Okayama, Japan	
Loss	10–23–4	Daniel Madrid	Submission (inverted triangle choke)	Art of War 14	September 26, 2009	2	4:19	Macau, SAR, China	
Loss	10–22–4	Min Suk Heo	TKO (punches)	DEEP: Grachan 2	July 12, 2009	1	3:08	Tokyo, Japan	
Loss	10–21–4	Ichiro Kanai	Technical Submission (arm-triangle choke)	Pancrase: Shining 10	December 7, 2008	1	2:25	Tokyo, Japan	
Loss	10–20–4	Lee Eun-Soo	Decision (unanimous)	DEEP: Gladiator	August 16, 2008	3	5:00	Okayama, Japan	
Loss	10–19–4	Yuichi Nakanishi	Decision (unanimous)	DEEP: 35 Impact	May 19, 2008	2	5:00	Tokyo, Japan	
Win	10–18–4	Young Choi	Decision (split)	DEEP: 34 Impact	February 22, 2008	3	5:00	Tokyo, Japan	Middleweight debut.
Loss	9–18–4	Carlos Toyota	TKO (punches)	DEEP: clubDEEP Kanazawa	December 9, 2007	2	2:22	Kanazawa, Ishikawa, Japan	
Loss	9–17–4	Mark Weir	Decision (unanimous)	Cage Rage 21	April 21, 2007	3	5:00	London, England	
Win	9–16–4	Tom Watson	Submission (armbar)	Cage Rage 20	February 10, 2007	1	0:59	London, England	
Loss	8–16–4	Flavio Luiz Moura	Decision (unanimous)	DEEP: 26 Impact	October 10, 2006	3	5:00	Tokyo, Japan	85 kg bout.
Loss	8–15–4	Yuki Kondo	Decision (unanimous)	Pancrase: Blow 6	August 27, 2006	3	5:00	Yokohama, Kanagawa, Japan	
Loss	8–14–4	Pierre Guillet	TKO (cut)	Cage Rage 17	July 1, 2006	2	4:08	London, England	
Win	8–13–4	Curtis Stout	Decision (majority)	Cage Rage 15	February 4, 2006	3	5:00	London, England	
Draw	7–13–4	Alex Reid	Draw	Cage Rage 14	December 3, 2005	3	5:00	London, England	
Win	7–13–3	Daisuke Watanabe	TKO (doctor stoppage)	Pancrase: 2005 Neo-Blood Tournament Finals	August 27, 2005	2	5:00	Tokyo, Japan	
Draw	6–13–3	Elvis Sinosic	Draw	Pancrase: Spiral 5	July 10, 2005	2	5:00	Yokohama, Japan	
Loss	6–13–2	Brian Foster	KO (knee)	Shoot Boxing: Ground Zero Fukuoka	January 23, 2005	1	2:28	Fukuoka, Japan	
Loss	6–12–2	Paulo Filho	Decision (unanimous)	Gladiator FC: Day 2	June 27, 2004	3	5:00	South Korea	
Loss	6–11–2	Ryo Chonan	Decision (majority)	DEEP: 13th Impact	January 22, 2004	3	5:00	Tokyo, Japan	90 kg bout.
Win	6–10–2	Kazuki Okubo	Decision (unanimous)	PRIDE 24	December 23, 2002	3	5:00	Fukuoka, Japan	
Win	5–10–2	Rory Singer	Decision (unanimous)	Pride FC: The Best, Vol. 3|PRIDE FC: The Best, Vol. 3	October 20, 2002	2	5:00	Tokyo, Japan	
Loss	4–10–2	Jerrel Venetiaan	Decision (split)	PRIDE Shockwave	August 28, 2002	3	5:00	Tokyo, Japan	
Loss	4–9–2	Rodrigo Gracie	Submission (guillotine choke)	PRIDE 19	February 24, 2002	3	0:28	Saitama, Japan	
Win	4–8–2	Quinton Jackson	DQ (knee to groin)	PRIDE 18	December 23, 2001	1	0:14	Fukuoka, Japan	
Loss	3–8–2	Murilo Rua	TKO (soccer kicks and stomps)	PRIDE 16	September 24, 2001	3	0:51	Osaka, Japan	
Loss	3–7–2	Ebenezer Fontes Braga	Decision (unanimous)	PRIDE 15	July 29, 2001	3	5:00	Saitama, Japan	
Win	3–6–2	Jose Landi-Jons	Decision (unanimous)	PRIDE 14: Clash of the Titans	May 27, 2001	3	5:00	Yokohama, Kanagawa, Japan	
Win	2–6–2	Rick Kerns	Decision (unanimous)	KOTC 8: Bombs Away	April 29, 2001	2	5:00	Williams, California, United States	
Loss	1–6–2	Amir Rahnavardi	Decision (unanimous)	KOTC 5: Cage Wars	September 16, 2000	3	5:00	San Jacinto, California, United States	
Loss	1–5–2	Vitor Belfort	Decision (unanimous)	PRIDE 10: Return of the Warriors	August 27, 2000	2	10:00	Saitama, Japan	
Loss	1–4–2	Todd Medina	Decision (unanimous)	KOTC 4: Gladiators	June 24, 2000	2	5:00	San Jacinto, California, United States	
Loss	1–3–2	Igor Vovchanchyn	TKO (doctor stoppage)	PRIDE 9	June 4, 2000	1	5:03	Nagoya, Aichi, Japan	
Loss	1–2–2	Wanderlei Silva	Decision (unanimous)	PRIDE 8	November 21, 1999	2	10:00	Tokyo, Japan	
Win	1–1–2	Bob Schrijber	DQ (kicked after bell)	PRIDE 7	September 12, 1999	1	10:00	Yokohama, Kanagawa, Japan	
Loss	0–1–2	Carlos Newton	Decision (unanimous)	PRIDE 6	July 4, 1999	3	5:00	Yokohama, Kanagawa, Japan	
Draw	0–0–2	Sanae Kikuta	Draw (time limit)	PRIDE 4	October 11, 1998	3	10:00	Tokyo, Japan	
Draw	0–0–1	Akira Shoji	Draw (time limit)	PRIDE 3	June 24, 1998	4	10:00	Tokyo, Japan	

== See also ==
- List of male mixed martial artists
