= Kazushi Sakuraba =

Japanese professional wrestler and mixed martial arts fighter

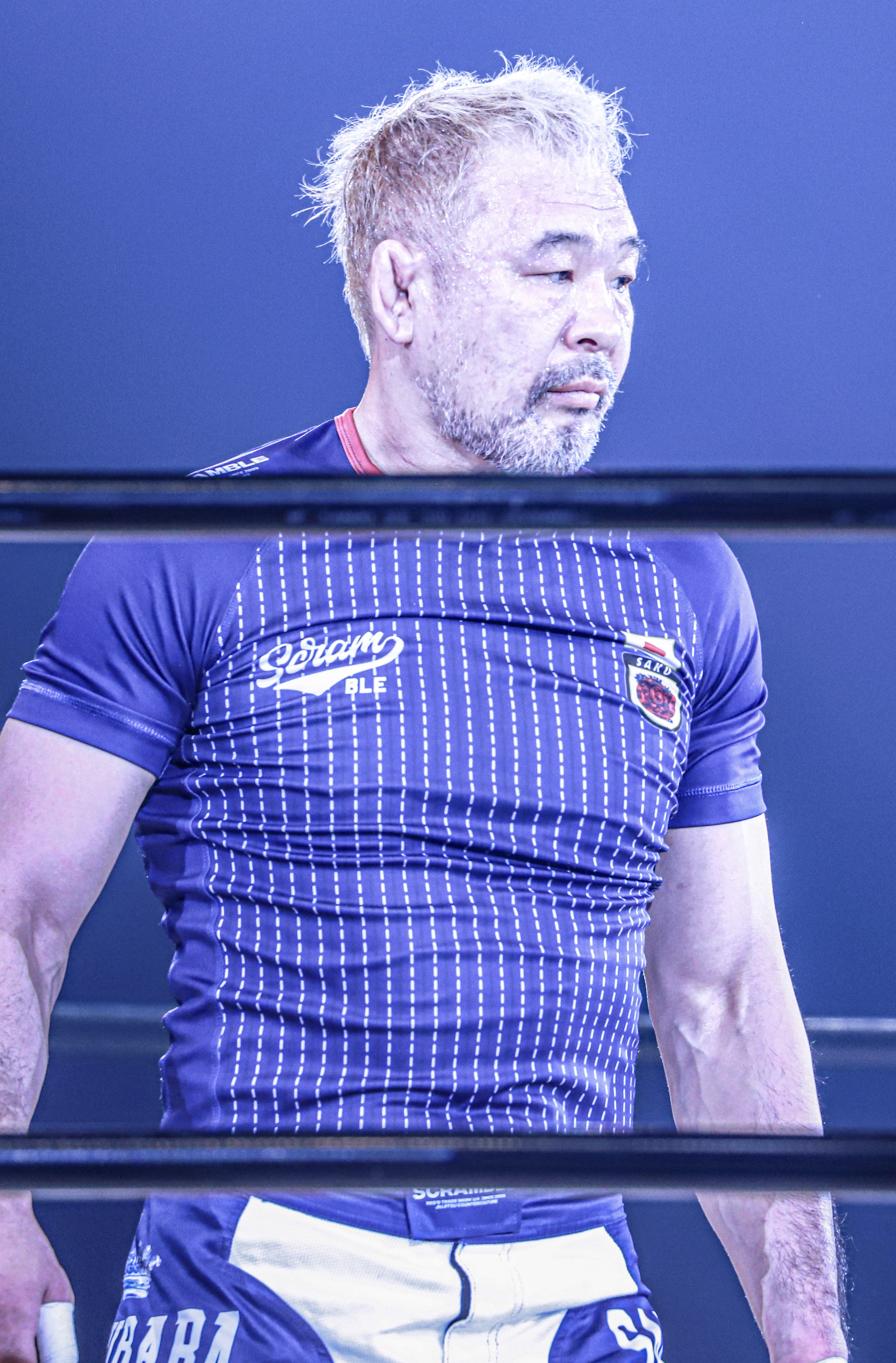
- Sakuraba in January 2023
- Born: July 14, 1969 (age 57); Shōwa, Akita, Japan (now Katagami, Akita, Japan)
- Other names: The Gracie Hunter
- Height: 180 cm (5 ft 11 in)
- Weight: 75.75 kg (167.0 lb; 11 st 13.0 lb)
- Division: Welterweight; Middleweight; Light Heavyweight; Openweight
- Reach: 186.7 cm (74 in)
- Style: Catch Wrestling; Shoot Wrestling
- Stance: Southpaw
- Team: Takada Dojo; Laughter7
- Teachers: Nobuhiko Takada; Yoji Anjo; Billy Robinson
- Years active: 1996–2011, 2015 (MMA) 1993–present (Wrestling)

Mixed martial arts record
- Total: 46
- Wins: 26
- By knockout: 4
- By submission: 19
- By decision: 3
- Losses: 17
- By knockout: 10
- By submission: 3
- By decision: 4
- Draws: 1
- No contests: 2

Other information
- Mixed martial arts record from Sherdog

Kazushi Sakuraba (Japanese: 桜庭 和志, Sakuraba Kazushi; born July 14, 1969) is a Japanese professional wrestler, submission wrestler and former mixed martial artist. He is performing as a freelancer, primarily appearing for Pro Wrestling Noah, where he was formerly one-half of the former GHC Tag Team Champions with Takashi Sugiura. He has also competed in traditional puroresu for New Japan Pro-Wrestling (NJPW) and shoot-style competition for UWFi and Kingdom Pro Wrestling (KPW). He has fought in MMA competition in the Ultimate Fighting Championship, Pride Fighting Championships, Hero's, Dream and most recently Rizin Fighting Federation. He is known as the Gracie Hunter or the Gracie Killer due to his wins over four members of the famed Gracie family: Royler Gracie, Renzo Gracie, Ryan Gracie, and Royce Gracie. Sakuraba is famous for beating 15 champions of different top MMA organizations; opponents who were often many weight-classes above him.

Known for his excellent skills in catch wrestling and unorthodox fighting style, he is considered one of the greatest mixed martial art fighters of all time, and holds notable victories over seven UFC champions, three Pancrase Champions, a DREAM champion, a King of the Cage champion and Battlecade Extreme Fighting champion; former Welterweight Champion Carlos Newton, two former Light heavyweight champions Vitor Belfort and Quinton Jackson, former Heavyweight Champion Kevin Randleman, three-time UFC Tournament champion Royce Gracie, former Superfight champion and King of Pancrase Ken Shamrock, former UFC Tournament champion and King of Pancrase Guy Mezger, former King of Pancrase Masakatsu Funaki, DREAM Super Hulk Tournament Champion Ikuhisa Minowa, former King of the Cage Light Heavyweight champion Vernon White, and former Battlecade Extreme Fighting champion Marcus Silveira. He is also the first of only two Japanese UFC champions. Sakuraba's Pride fights routinely drew over 20 million viewers in Japan. Sakuraba is the founder of the submission wrestling promotion Quintet, where he has competed since 2018.

== Early life ==
Sakuraba became a fan of Japanese professional wrestling during childhood thanks to the Tiger Mask manga, with the eponymous New Japan Pro-Wrestling wrestler Tiger Mask being his favorite. After being convinced not to drop out of high school to pursue professional wrestling, Sakuraba began a career in amateur wrestling at age 15, hoping to gain a useful background to achieve his childhood dream. A high school stand-out, he finished as high as second in the nation before joining the freestyle wrestling squad of Chuo University, a team which had counted Olympic gold medalists Shozo Sasahara and Osamu Watanabe amongst its ranks. He won the East Japan Freshman championship in his first year and served as their team captain thereafter. In his senior year, he finished fourth in the All-Japan tournament. Amongst his notable wins was one over future Olympic bronze medalist Takuya Ota. Upon graduating from college, Sakuraba considered remaining with Chuo University as a coach. However, at the last minute, he decided to continue his road to professional wrestling.

== Professional wrestling ==
=== Background ===
Having weighed 68 kg (150 lb) for most of his amateur wrestling career, Sakuraba was encouraged by his peers to gain weight, as it would be difficult to compete as a smaller fighter in pro wrestling. After working to gain the weight needed to compete, he never wanted to lose it anymore, something that would be reflected in his MMA career. Finding himself attracted by the shoot wrestling movement, which had been by his childhood idol Sayama, Sakuraba considered joining the mixed martial arts organization Pancrase, but he ultimately chose the promotion Union of Wrestling Forces International, a professional wrestling league that was nonetheless known for its highly technical and realistic-looking bouts.

=== Union of Wrestling Forces International (1993–1996) ===
His time in the UWF-i proved to be a formative experience for Sakuraba. He received his initial instruction in grappling and striking under main trainer Yoji Anjo, later honing his catch wrestling skills under the tutelage of Billy Robinson. He also trained in muay thai under master Bovy Chowaikung, the main UWF-i striking teacher. Those disciplines served as the base of the unorthodox game that later lead him to success in the Pride Fighting Championships. Over time he became one of Takada's four main trainees, along with Kiyoshi Tamura, Yoshihiro Takayama and Masahito Kakihara.

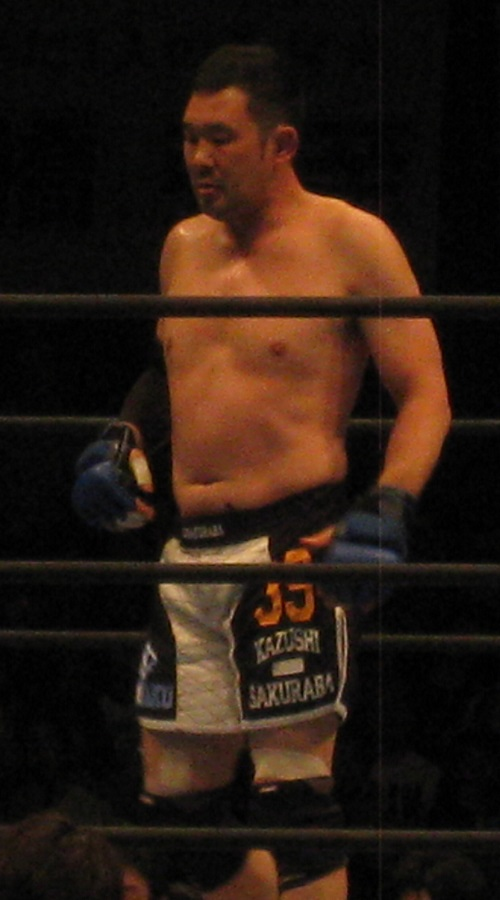
Sakuraba in November 2013

In spite of his amateur pedigree, Sakuraba was forced to work his way up from the bottom of the UWFi's rungs, as is traditional in puroresu. He lost his debut on August 13, 1993, to Steve Nelson and went winless through his rookie year with the league. It is also popularly alleged that under the eye of Kiyoshi Tamura, he was made to perfectly perform menial chores about the dojo. Still undeterred, Sakuraba steadily built a working knowledge of submission holds upon his freestyle wrestling base until his efforts were at last rewarded with a win over Mark Silver in October 1994.

Though his record remained below .500, Sakuraba continued to edge his way closer to mid-card status through the rest of the year. Then, in 1995, the UWFi began an inter-promotional feud with New Japan Pro-Wrestling. The vast majority of UWF-i workers came out on the losing end of the booking to the larger and more mainstream promotion and Sakuraba was no exception. He was defeated in high-profile bouts to Tokimitsu Ishizawa, Koji Kanemoto and Shinjiro Otani, bringing Sakuraba a new level of exposure to the public. The ring psychology and technical prowess he displayed in the bouts also impressed the management of the UWF-i enough that he was finally pushed towards main event status.

New Japan's dominance in the feud injured the marketability of the UWFi promotion, which had pressed the perception that their athletes boasted legitimate skill in real fighting. In a bid to regain credibility, Yoji Anjo travelled to California to perform a dojo challenge on Rickson Gracie, only to be swiftly and brutally defeated before the assembled Japanese press that had followed him there. With the UWFi's formerly fearsome reputation in tatters, its attendance numbers swiftly decreased, with the federation closing its doors once and for all in December 1996. In their final show it was Sakuraba who at long last headlined, defeating Anjoh by submission.

=== Kingdom Pro Wrestling (1997–1998) ===
Following the close of the UWFi, Nobuhiko Takada, the most popular UWFi workers amongst the mainstream public founded Kingdom Pro Wrestling, taking in Sakuraba and most of his fellow UWFi alumni. In the vein of its predecessor, Kingdom was primarily a league devoted to shoot-style realistic-looking works. Having by now established his ability, Sakuraba was this time booked as a main-eventer from the outset. However, unlike the UWFi, Kingdom struggled from the beginning to draw substantial crowds. Mixed martial arts was growing in popularity, and the dominance of the Gracie family and their fellow Brazilian jiu-jitsu practitioners over the field and more specifically over professional wrestlers, left the Japanese public ever more unconvinced as to the fighting ability of Kingdom's stable of athletes.

=== Inoki Bom-Ba-Ye (2000) ===
On New Year's Eve 2000, Sakuraba defeated Kendo Kashin at Inoki Bom-Ba-Ye in Osaka.

=== Inoki Genome Federation (2011) ===
Eleven years later on New Year's Eve 2011, Sakuraba teamed with Katsuyori Shibata as they defeated Atsushi Sawada and Shinichi Suzukawa at Inoki Genome Federation in Saitama, Japan.

=== New Japan Pro-Wrestling (2012–2016) ===
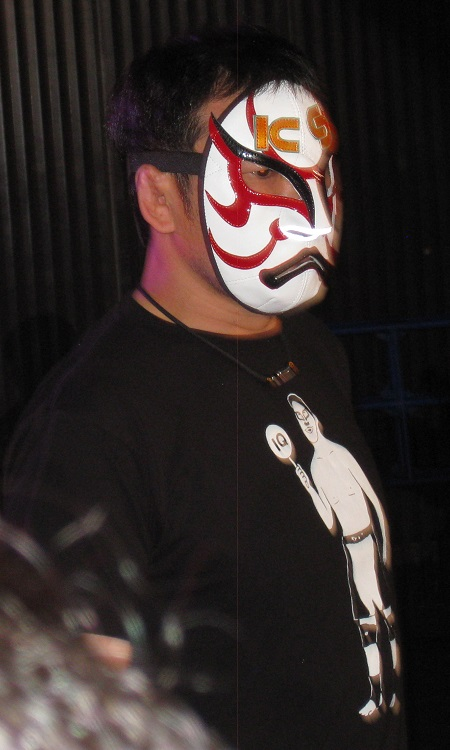
Sakuraba in June 2013

On August 12, 2012, Sakuraba, alongside Katsuyori Shibata, started appearing in New Japan Pro-Wrestling. It was Sakuraba's first work for the company since 1995, and the first ever as a free agent instead of a representative from another promotion. Sakuraba and Shibata wrestled their first match on September 23, defeating Hiromu Takahashi and Wataru Inoue in a tag team match. Sakuraba and Shibata, collectively dubbed Laughter7, continued their winning ways at the following two pay-per-views, King of Pro-Wrestling on October 8 and Power Struggle on November 11, both times defeating the team of Togi Makabe and Wataru Inoue. Also at Power Struggle, Shinsuke Nakamura nominated Sakuraba as the next challenger for his IWGP Intercontinental Championship. On December 2, Sakuraba won his first exchange with Nakamura, when Laughter7 defeated Nakamura and Tomohiro Ishii in a tag team match to remain undefeated since their return. On January 4, 2013, at Wrestle Kingdom 7 in Tokyo Dome, Sakuraba suffered his first defeat since his return to professional wrestling, when he unsuccessfully challenged Shinsuke Nakamura for the IWGP Intercontinental Championship. Sakuraba and Shibata returned to their winning ways at the following pay-per-view, The New Beginning on February 10, where they defeated Hirooki Goto and Wataru Inoue in a tag team match. On April 7 at Invasion Attack, Sakuraba and Shibata suffered their first tag team loss, when they were defeated by Hirooki Goto and Yuji Nagata via referee stoppage, when Sakuraba injured his right elbow, after taking a belly-to-back suplex from Nagata, and unable to continue the match. New Japan later announced that Sakuraba would be sidelined for two to three months. Sakuraba wrestled his return match on July 20, defeating Yuji Nagata via submission. On September 8, Sakuraba and Shibata took part in the Wrestle-1 promotion's inaugural event, defeating Masakatsu Funaki and Masayuki Kono in a tag team match. Sakuraba continued his rivalry with Yuji Nagata at the September 29 Destruction pay-per-view, where he and Shibata defeated Nagata and Manabu Nakanishi with Sakuraba pinning his rival for the win.

On October 14, Sakuraba was defeated by Nagata in a singles rematch between the two. Following the match, Sakuraba and Nagata came together to accept a challenge issued by Daniel and Rolles Gracie On January 4, 2014, at Wrestle Kingdom 8 in Tokyo Dome, Sakuraba and Nagata defeated the Gracies via disqualification, after Nagata was choked out with a gi. A rematch between the two teams took place on February 11 at The New Beginning in Osaka and saw Rolles submit Sakuraba for the win. Sakuraba suffered another loss against the Gracies on May 3 at Wrestling Dontaku 2014, where he teamed with Shinsuke Nakamura. On May 25 at Back to the Yokohama Arena, Sakuraba ended the Gracies' win streak by defeating Rolles in a singles match. Sakuraba then started a new rivalry with Minoru Suzuki, while also forming a partnership with Toru Yano, who was also involved in his own rivalry with Suzuki's Suzuki-gun stable. The partnership led to Sakuraba becoming an associate of Yano and Nakamura's Chaos stable, eventually becoming a full-time member. The rivalry between Sakuraba and Suzuki culminated in a match on January 4, 2015, at Wrestle Kingdom 9 in Tokyo Dome, where Sakuraba was defeated.

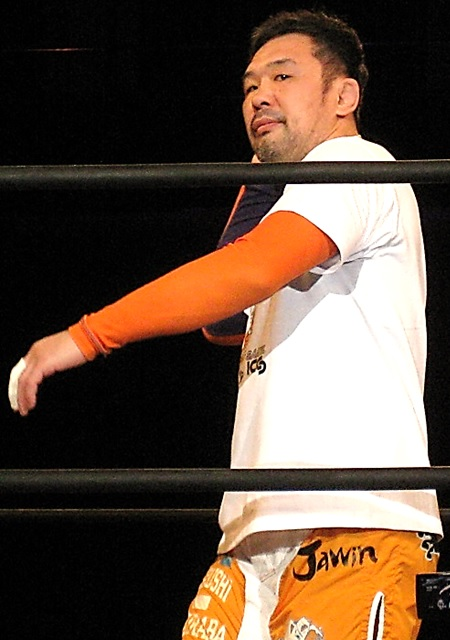
Sakuraba in March 2015

On April 5 at Invasion Attack 2015, Sakuraba submitted Katsuyori Shibata in a tag team match, where he and Yano defeated Shibata and Hiroshi Tanahashi, igniting a rivalry between the former Laughter7 partners. The two faced off on July 5 at Dominion 7.5 in Osaka-jo Hall in a match, where Shibata was victorious.

=== Pro Wrestling Noah (2019–present) ===
After wrestling sporadically for independent promotions for a few years, Sakuraba returned to wrestling full-time for Pro Wrestling Noah, aligning himself with the Sugiura-gun faction headed by Takashi Sugiura. On 30 August 2020 Sakuraba and Sugiura defeated AXIZ (Go Shiozaki and Katsuhiko Nakajima) for the vacant GHC Tag Team Championship, Sakuraba's first ever pro-wrestling title. In September Sakuraba entered the annual N1-Victory tournament as a singles competitor, finishing on 4 points with 2 wins and 3 losses. As of 22 November Sakuraba and Sugiura have successfully defended the GHC tag titles on two occasions.

== Mixed martial arts ==
=== Early career ===
Though sources often cite Sakuraba's match with Kimo Leopoldo on July 14, 1996, as his first experience with mixed martial arts, there is debate about whether it was a shoot or a worked match. Sakuraba himself stated that he doesn't remember it. However, his first contact with MMA can be traced to his different style fight at 26 June 1996 against Dutch kickboxer Rene Rooze, which Sakuraba won by ankle hold.

=== Ultimate Fighting Championship ===
To attempt to gain attention for the embattled Kingdom Pro Wrestling league, Hiromitsu Kanehara and Yoji Anjoh signed to compete in the Ultimate Fighting Championship's Ultimate Japan tournament. Kanehara was injured in training for the tournament, and Sakuraba wound up his late-hour substitute. The tournament was intended for heavyweights but Sakuraba, who weighed 183 pounds (middleweight by modern standards), was nearly twenty pounds beneath the UFC's 200-pound heavyweight designation. He reported himself as 203 pounds (Light heavyweight by modern standards) to gain entry and was paired against 240-pound Brazilian jiu-jitsu blackbelt and former Extreme Fighting champion, Marcus Silveira.

The match saw the two grapplers exchange leglocks without any decisive movement. Following a barrage of light blows by Silveira, Sakuraba dropped for a low single leg takedown, but referee John McCarthy stopped the fight before Sakuraba could complete it, believing he had been knocked out by the punches. A loud protest followed from the crowd and an angry Sakuraba attempted unsuccessfully to take the microphone and address the Japanese audience. However, after reviewing tape, McCarthy changed his decision to a no-contest. As Tank Abbott, who earlier defeated Anjoh, had dropped from the tournament due to an injured hand, it was ruled that Sakuraba and Silveira faced off once more that night in what would be the championship bout of the tournament.

Silveira opened their second match taking Sakuraba's back, which the Japanese wrestler answered by attempting to apply a Kimura lock. After freeing his arm, Silveira capitalized on another Kimura attempt to try to twist it into an armbar from his guard, only for the Japanese to escape to his knees. Silveira then tried his own Kimura, but at that moment Sakuraba reversed it in the same way and locked the armbar, making the Brazilian submit. Afterwards, in the post-fight interview, Sakuraba famously stated, "In fact, professional wrestling is strong" (プロレスラーは本当は強いんです, Puroresurā wa hontōwa tsuyoi n desu). With the victory Sakuraba remains one of the last UFC tournament champions to date.

With Nobuhiko Takada having left Kingdom to challenge Rickson Gracie in an event called Pride Fighting Championships, the still struggling promotion capitalized on Sakuraba's newly found popularity establishing him as Kingdom's top talent. He embarked on a winning streak against several foreign mixed martial arts competitors including Paul Herrera, Rene Rooze, Mark Hall and Orlando Weit. However, Kingdom continued to flounder and finally folded in March 1998.

=== Pride Fighting Championships ===
==== Pride 2 through 8 ====
Entering the Pride Fighting Championships on the heels of stablemate Nobuhiko Takada's defeat at the hands of Rickson Gracie in the organization's initial event, Sakuraba was paired off against Vernon White, then a veteran of 32 bouts in Pancrase who also boasted a 20-pound weight advantage. Showcasing a balance of wrestling and submission prowess, Sakuraba came after White with constant takedowns and unceasing submission attempts. White held Sakuraba off for the first two rounds, but was ultimately submitted by armbar towards the end of the third round.

Next, in Pride 3, Sakuraba was matched against Ultimate Fighting Championship veteran Carlos Newton. Though relatively new to mixed martial arts, Newton had recently disposed of reigning Shooto light heavyweight champion Erik Paulson with a swift armbar victory and developed a reputation as a talented grappler. Accordingly, the match was a back and forth grappling affair between the two fighters. At the second round, after several exchanges on the mat, Newton looked to capture Sakuraba's back, but the Japanese trapped him in a rolling kneebar and finished him.

Eager to capitalize on Sakuraba's shoot wrestling prowess to reverse the perception that Japanese professional wrestlers were inferior to Brazilian combatants (in part perpetuated by his teammates' own defeats), Sakuraba's next three bouts were scheduled against Brazilian jiu-jitsu black belts Vitor Belfort, Allan Goes and luta livre black belt Ebenezer Fontes Braga. In a trend that continued through Sakuraba's Pride career, each opponent occupied a spot near the top of the 205-pound class at the time of their fight and held a weight advantage of around 20 pounds.

Sakuraba's match against Goes was instrumental point in his fighting's style evolution, pitted against an opponent with a strong defensive guard. Through the bout, Sakuraba attempted several moves to bypass the stationary Goes's defense, including leglocks, dives and kicks to the legs, but he also has to defend, as Goes was relentless in his upkicks and submission counterattacks. Sakuraba was threatened by a rear naked choke several times, and in turn almost finished Allan with an armbar, but none of it came to fruition. Due to the absence of judges in Pride's ruleset at the time, the match was declared a draw. Sakuraba, always humble, stated "I fight his style, not mine. I think I lost the fight", although Goes, a Carlson Gracie protege, would similarly state in a later interview "I've been training my whole life on the ground, and to me, [Sakuraba] was the best guy I ever faced on the ground".

Belfort was being a different matchup, as his boxing prowess was known aside from his great grappling credentials. However, despite several big flurries by the Brazilian to open the match, Sakuraba went unscathed and took Belfort down, proceeding to land ground and pound. As Belfort would not leave the mat through the match, in part due to a broken hand in one of his combos, Sakuraba deployed his improved strategy and punished Vitor with leg kicks and jumping stomps to the head, as well as landing unanswered striking combinations every time Belfort was called up by the referee. At the end, as Pride had just implemented the judges system, Sakuraba was awarded his first decision victory unanimously.

Unlike the previous two matches, Kazushi faced in Braga a consistently aggressive opponent, with the luta livre practitioner landing effective muay thai knees and kicks until Sakuraba put him down. The Japanese wrestler continued his signature guard assault, but also outstruck Braga in his last standing segment before taking him down again and lock an armbar for the tap out.

==== "The Gracie Hunter" ====
After defeating Anthony Macias at Pride 7, Sakuraba was matched against Royler Gracie, who had previously conquered Sakuraba's stablemate Yuhi Sano. It marked the largest weight advantage Sakuraba has enjoyed in his career to date (being around 30 pounds heavier than Royler). Royler, unable to score a takedown or strike effectively from a standing position, remained on the ground in an effort to bait Sakuraba into a grappling-oriented contest, while Sakuraba, standing, landed punishing kicks to Royler's legs, thighs and head. Eventually, with less than two minutes remaining, Sakuraba finally engaged Royler on the ground and instantly caught him in a Kimura lock. As Sakuraba wrenched on the submission, the referee intervened with 1 minute and 44 seconds remaining on the clock, ending the contest and awarding Sakuraba the win by TKO.

Sakuraba's victory over Royler constituted the first loss by a Gracie in professional fighting in several decades and as such, sent ripples of shock and controversy through the mixed martial arts community. Some protested that the victory was tainted because Royler (although placed in a debilitating submission hold) never conceded defeat and was little time away from the final bell when the bout was stopped. It is worth noting that the last Japanese athlete to defeat a Gracie prior to Sakuraba's win against Royler, legendary judoka Masahiko Kimura, used the same technique Sakuraba utilized to beat Royler. That time, the recipient had been Royler's father, Hélio Gracie, who like Royler refused to submit but likewise lost.

==== Pride 2000 Grand Prix ====
While the Japanese fight media rejoiced and elevated Sakuraba to superstar status, the Gracie family took great umbrage over the incident, feeling they had been cheated by Pride. Despite Sakuraba challenging Royler's older brother Rickson Gracie after the match, it was his younger brother and former UFC Champion Royce Gracie who, compelled to set the record straight and re-assert the dominance of his family, returned to the sport of mixed martial arts in 2000 and entered the 16-Man Pride Grand Prix alongside Sakuraba and several top fighters of the era. Royce was placed on the same side of the bracket, and the Gracies requested a special set of rules in the event of a Sakuraba-Royce match, including no referee stoppages and no time-limits, the fight ending only in the event of a submission or knock-out (something prohibited in modern MMA because of the widely adopted Unified Rules of Mixed Martial Arts limiting matches to 25 minutes overall, 5 x 5 minute rounds).

In his first fight of the 2000 Pride tournament Sakuraba once again found himself matched up against a heavier opponent, this time the well-regarded 205 pound fighter, former King of Pancrase Guy Mezger. After a closely fought 15 minutes the judges requested an overtime round, and the fight ended in controversy when Mezger's coach Ken Shamrock forced his fighter back to the locker room claiming that no additional rounds were agreed upon in the contract. Sakuraba ended up winning the match by forfeit. Meanwhile, Royce defeated Nobuhiko Takada by unanimous decision and thus set the stage for their much anticipated showdown.

In the tournament quarterfinals Royce and Sakuraba battled for an hour and a half (six 15-minute rounds). Gracie opened the fight aggressively, raining punches from Kazushi's back while the Japanese fighter worked an armlock from standing, but Sakuraba kept calm, knowing Royce had no knockout power and expecting him to waste his energy; he even came to the point of smiling to the cameras during the attack. Towards the end of the round, Sakuraba nearly ended the match with a kneebar, while Gracie came back with a guillotine choke at the second, but Kazushi again joked to show he was out of danger by simulating to pull down Royce's gi pants. Sakuraba switched to attack at the third round, dominating the stand up and making Royce lie repeatedly on the ground to avoid him. As the confrontation stretched on, the Gracies' own no time-limit rules began to work against Royce as Sakuraba's wrestling skills and balance nullified Royce's ability to score a takedown and—in some instances—even pull guard. Even Royce's ever-present jiu-jitsu gi became a weapon for the wrestler as Sakuraba used it to help him control Gracie when the fight did come to the ground. However, with Sakuraba's control of the takedown, these instances of ground warfare became increasingly sporadic. After Kazushi landed a long series of punishing leg kicks in the fifth and sixth rounds, Royce's brother Rorion threw in the towel.

Exhausted from his battle with Royce, Sakuraba surprised many when he emerged from the locker room for the tournament semi-finals. His opponent, Igor Vovchanchyn, outweighed him by close to sixty pounds (Sakuraba had come into the bout with Royce lighter than usual, at 176 pounds) and was considered the top heavyweight striker of the day. Sakuraba surprised many by taking Vovchanchyn down and nearly finishing him with an armbar. Sakuraba was actually leading the fight past the 10-minute mark, but near the end Igor reversed a takedown and drew the first round even with ground strikes. After the first round was declared a draw, Sakuraba's corner threw in the towel before the beginning of overtime, primarily due to fatigue.

==== Pride 10 through 15 ====
Following the Grand Prix, Sakuraba was christened the "Gracie Hunter" by the Japanese sports media. Keeping in tow with his new nickname, Sakuraba sandwiched a swift victory via achilles lock against Shannon Ritch between fights against brothers Renzo Gracie and Ryan Gracie. In contrast to Royler and Royce, Renzo and Ryan were products of Carlson Gracie's approach to jiu-jitsu, which placed a stronger emphasis on combat-ready skills and training without a gi.

At the time of his bout with Sakuraba, Renzo's only loss in 10 bouts was a closely contested decision to Sakuraba's former UWFi stablemate and rival, Kiyoshi Tamura while Maurice Smith, Oleg Taktarov and Abu Dhabi champion Sanae Kikuta numbered amongst his victims. Renzo's stylistic differences from his cousins were in evidence from the outset of his contest against Sakuraba, as he pressed the pace of the bout with a variety of kicks and punches, although few connected. Sakuraba responded in kind, and the striking seemed to go to a stalemate. Throwing his wrestling into the equation, Sakuraba timed a number of double and single leg takedowns against Renzo's flurries from where he alternately attempted to cartwheel past Gracie's guard, malign his legs with kicks from the standing position and even attack with a baseball slide. However, Renzo's defensive skills from bottom nullified the entire gamut of Sakuraba's offensive attempts, and after using an entry derived from the De la Riva guard, he took the wrestler's back, pressing him against the turnbuckle as mere seconds remained in the battle. With time ticking away, Sakuraba locked in a kimura from the back and spun around, flipping Renzo to the canvas even as he wrenched his arm behind his back. Like Royler and Helio before him, Renzo refused to submit to the hold despite his elbow being snapped prior to hitting the ground and, even as the referee stopped the contest due to the injury, which awarded victory to Sakuraba.

Renzo took the microphone and, before the 35,000 fans assembled at the Seibu Dome, stated that Sakuraba was "the Japanese version of the Gracie family." Renzo has called the bout as his proudest moment in mixed martial arts. Similarly, years later Gracie called Sakuraba "his hero" and remembered their match as "one of the biggest lessons he learned in his life". Commentator Stephen Quadros stated too: "if any fans still doubted the abilities of Kazushi Sakuraba in MMA competition, they are now silent." Ryan Gracie, who fought on the same card and emerged victorious, jumped into the ring to challenge Sakuraba, who accepted. Vitor Belfort also demanded a rematch, although Sakuraba stated he was not interested in rematches because he wanted to face Frank Shamrock, Tito Ortiz and Dan Henderson.

The fight between Sakuraba and Ryan was scheduled for Pride 12. Due to a shoulder injury, the fight was limited to a single 10-minute round, where Ryan's spirited efforts were generally stymied and controlled by Sakuraba, who noticeably avoided attacks on his younger opponent's injured arm. Despite it, Kazushi later argued in an interview that he believed Ryan was faking the injury to catch him off guard. Nonetheless, the Japanese threw some of his usual antics during the match, at some points delivering chops to Ryan's rear while controlling him.

Following the win against Ryan, Sakuraba was slated to battle Pancrase veteran Bas Rutten, but Rutten declined and was replaced by Brazilian muay thai specialist Wanderlei Silva. Sakuraba was a heavy favorite to win, but he was fighting through a significant weight disadvantage. The bout was also contested under Pride's new rules, which allowed kicks and knees to the head of a downed opponent, a change that greatly benefitted Wanderlei. During the match, a Sakuraba willing to trade strikes managed to knock Wanderlei down with a right hook, but the Brazilian recovered and dropped the wrestler with a barrage of punches and kicks. As Sakuraba turtled while attempted a takedown, Silva delivered multiple knees to his head and ultimately finished him off with kicks to the face. It marked Sakuraba's second defeat in mixed martial arts and his first loss in the 205-pound division. Sakuraba then shocked the audience further by giving Silva his belt with Saku engraved on it. Wanderlei then stated that he would willingly give Sakuraba a rematch if Sakuraba wanted one, which the Japanese accepted.

After sitting out the next Pride to recuperate, Sakuraba found himself across the ring from Quinton Jackson, a former collegiate wrestler who had compiled a record of 10–1 on the American circuit. At the sound of the bell, Sakuraba immediately took the bigger man to the canvas with a low single-leg takedown. However, Jackson's superior size and enormous physical strength allowed him to muscle out of Sakuraba's submission attempts. After locking his legs around Jackson for a triangle choke, Sakuraba found himself hefted into the air and repeatedly slammed to the canvas in the way of a powerbomb. Later, he attempted an armbar against Jackson, only for the Tennessee native to again lift him up and this time attempt to drop him from the ring. His expression unchanging through the course of Jackson's assault, Sakuraba continued to flow from one lock to another. Eventually, he took the back of an exhausted Jackson and submitted him with his first rear naked choke victory. The contest was a launchpad for Jackson's career, leading to a long-term contract with Pride where he eventually became regarded as a top middleweight competitor, and later, a UFC champion.

==== Title bout with Silva, losing streak ====
The Jackson bout also re-established Sakuraba's proficiency in dealing with larger opponents and placed him back in line for another shot at Wanderlei Silva in Pride's next event, this time to decide Pride's inaugural 205-pound champion. Usually prone to humorous entrances, it was a somber and focused Sakuraba that came down the aisle for his rematch with Silva. As with Jackson, Sakuraba was able to score an early takedown in the bout, where he then worked from Silva's guard. After several minutes searching for a leglock, he finally found one when Silva attempted to escape to his feet. Sakuraba started to control the fight, avoiding Silva's strikes and threatening him with clinches and takedown attempts. Halfway through the round, the Japanese locked on a tight guillotine choke, but was countered by a wild slam from Wanderlei which ended up breaking his collar bone. The wrestler managed to end the round with submission attempts from the bottom, but not willing to let him go on so hampered, his corner threw in the towel between rounds.

Sakuraba took time off to let his shoulder heal, also briefly training basic Brazilian jiu-jitsu with Sergio Penha at Takada Dojo. He then returned against heavyweight kickboxer Mirko Cro Cop. Sakuraba was proposed a special ruleset of no strikes on the ground as part of the "K-1 vs Pride theme", but he rejected the offer, not wanting any special rule for him. Ironically, although he managed to take Cro Cop down through hard kicks, Sakuraba would end losing the match while exchanging strikes on Mirko's guard when an upkick from the kickboxer broke his orbital bone.

Finally assenting to place him in competition against fighters of his own weight class, Pride management put him against French jiu-jitsu champion Gilles Arsene in a bout Sakuraba dominated and then against Rickson Gracie protege Antônio Schembri. With a win over Schembri, it was speculated that Sakuraba might be then groomed for a championship fight in a new weight division for fighters of his size. Sakuraba controlled the fight initially, landing plenty of hits and breaking Antônio's nose, but when he was going for one of his trademark Mongolian chops, Schembri stunned him with a series of knee strikes (controversially preceded by an illegal headbutt), winning by TKO.

After the defeat to Schembri, Sakuraba expressed desire to gain weight and move up to the heavyweight division, hoping to fight either Bob Sapp or PRIDE Heavyweight Champion Fedor Emelianenko. However, nothing of this was realized, and instead Sakuraba faced Wanderlei Silva for the third time at Pride Total Elimination. The bout reminisced their first encounter, as Sakuraba flashed again a comical entrance and traded strikes with Silva in his own field of specialty. The Japanese utilized a strategy of faking takedowns and attacking with uppercuts, followed by a real takedown attempt which Silva blocked with knees to the head. Sakuraba escaped and kept trading hits, but despite his best efforts to match his opponent's striking acumen, Wanderlei knocked him out with a jab-cross combination. After the fight, there was talk of Kazushi planning to retire, but nothing came from it.

Those defeats seemed to mark a turning point in Sakuraba's career; though he was unbeaten in his first nine Pride bouts, he thereafter split his next six matches. He had a notable victory over Kevin Randleman, a former UFC Heavyweight Champion, widely remembered due to his ring entrance as Mario, a pun intended to reflect the Japanese media referring to Randleman as Donkey Kong. In the match itself, Randleman was fast in showing his wrestling accolades at taking down Sakuraba, but the Japanese countered by setting submissions from every available position, until the American made a mistake and was caught in an armbar in the third round.

At Pride Shockwave 2003, Sakuraba would face Antônio Rogério Nogueira, brother to the famous Antônio Rodrigo Nogueira. The Brazilian, having promised to knock out the Japanese, opened the match lunging at him with punches, but Kazushi answered in kind and opened a cut on Nogueira's eye which almost stopped the bout. The action resumed, both men battled for several minutes, with Rogério gaining the upper hand in striking and Sakuraba in wrestling, allowing him to get in Nogueira's guard and inflict significant damage again. During the second round, Nogueira managed to catch Sakuraba in a triangle choke/armbar combo, but the Japanese escaped the hold and sought his own submission, to no effect. Finally, the third round saw Nogueira taking over with punches and knees, exchanging strikes with Sakuraba almost until the last minute, and ultimately winning the decision.

==== Pride 2005 Middleweight Grand Prix ====
After a quick TKO victory over decorated judoka Yoon Dong-Sik in the opening round, Sakuraba suffered a particularly devastating yet controversial loss against Ricardo Arona in the quarterfinal of the tournament in June 2005. Although Sakuraba put Arona on his back and seemed to put to work his signature jumping stomps, the heavier and stronger Arona soon overpowered him, landing a series of brutal knees to the head, as well as hard soccer kicks to the face. The Brazilian's toenail accidentally slashed open the skin over Sakuraba's left eye, which Ricardo then capitalized on by squeezing the cut and digging his finger into it in order to force the doctor stoppage. The Japanese tried to keep on, but Arona hit another flurry of knees to the head, and ended the fight landing soccer kick after soccer kick, rendering Kazushi's face severely swollen and bloody. Sakuraba would eventually lose the fight by technical knockout after his corner called a stop to the fight at the conclusion of the second round, due to the amount of damage he had sustained.

Following the loss, Pride president Sakakibara suggested Sakuraba might move down in weight to compete in their newly formed 183-pound division. However, instead of moving down in weight, Sakuraba began training at Chute Boxe Academy in Brazil alongside his one-time rival Wanderlei Silva. The move had also a symbolic value, as Chute Boxe was at the time in a rivalry with Arona's Brazilian Top Team.

==== Post Grand Prix ====
Upon completion of his training, he made his return to the ring to engage in yet another contest at the 205-pound limit, this time against fellow shoot wrestler Ken Shamrock. Three minutes into the bout, Sakuraba struck through Shamrock's guard with a left hand. Shamrock staggered back and ultimately fell into the ropes, his head hanging out of the ring and his back turned to Sakuraba. Sakuraba rushed in to follow up but before any meaningful offense could be launched, the fight was halted by referee Yuji Shimada. Shamrock got up following the KO and protested vigorously. Opinions were mixed regarding the KO's legitimacy, though Ken's adopted brother and rival, Frank, stated to believe the stoppage was justified: "He got clocked. He went down. According to the rules, he was no longer defending himself and that's the end of the fight."

Prior to Pride's Shockwave 2005 New Year's Eve event, Sakuraba strongly petitioned for a match against fellow shoot wrestler and professional wrestling proponent, Kiyoshi Tamura, even going so far as to publicly request a bout with Tamura. However, with Tamura refusing to face him, Sakuraba recommended another shoot wrestler, Ikuhisa Minowa, who referred to himself as a "real pro wrestler." Sakuraba did not request the match due to any grudge against Minowa, but rather because he believed that he and Minowa would put on a fight worthy of the Shockwave event. The bout was a competitive one, with Sakuraba choosing to fight from the bottom and using both men's submission attempts to force scrambles. After long minutes pinned under Sakuraba, Minowa escaped and took his back, but Kazushi applied a Kimura lock which, although Minowa would not tap to it, nonetheless prompted the referee to halt the contest. The victory marked his final bout under the Pride banner; it also marked one of the few times he was matched against an opponent of his own size from the 183-pound division and his first bout against a Japanese fighter.

=== Hero's ===
==== Leaving Pride ====
On 3 May 2006, Sakuraba surprisingly appeared with Hero's head Akira Maeda at a Hero's event wearing his street clothes (yellow shirt and blue jeans) and a pro wrestling mask in the style of one of his childhood heroes, Tiger Mask. He did not reveal himself, but it was apparent that it was a masked Sakuraba and that he signed with K-1 and FEG. A day later, Sakuraba appeared at a FEG press conference to announce he would fight in Hero's. His defection to Hero's was a culmination of several signs that suggested he was leaving Pride. It was reported that Sakuraba left Takada Dojo (run by Pride's general manager, Nobuhiko Takada), and conspicuously was not entered into Pride's 2006 Open Weight Grand Prix Tournament.

==== Hero's Light Heavyweight Tournament ====
Sakuraba was then scheduled to compete in Hero's Light Heavyweight Tournament. His first opponent was the 16–5 Lithuanian Kęstutis Smirnovas. Sakuraba opened the fight striking aggressively, even flooring Smirnovas with a kick, but as he was coming in to follow up he was caught and knocked down to his knees and hands. Kazushi then turned over, sliding beneath the bottom rope, and Smirnovas unleashed repeated blows to his head. As Sakuraba seemed at this point unable to defend himself, when the referee stepped between the two fighters it seemed likely he was moving to put an end to the contest. However, instead of halting the battle, the referee re-positioned the fighters from underneath the bottom rope into the ring and resumed the bout. Though the restarting of fighters who have found themselves near or outside the ropes is common practice, it was nonetheless controversial. Following the restart, Smirnovas picked up where he'd left off and proceed to pound a turtled Sakuraba, but the Japanese managed to escape to his feet and land a sharp combination, staggering Smirnovas and bloodying his face. Having turned the tide of the match, Sakuraba began dominating the Lithuanian on the striking segments until Smirnovas dropped to the ground to escape the assault. Sakuraba then accomplished an armbar, forcing his opponent to give up.

Initially there were some doubts as to whether Sakuraba would be able to make it into the next round of the Hero's tournament based on the severity of the damage he endured against Smirnovas. However, Sakuraba reported that a follow-up CAT scan had found no irregularities and was then slated to face one-time Olympic judoka, Yoshihiro Akiyama in the tournament's semi-finals on October 9 in what K-1 hoped would be a high revenue match-up. The winner of that bout was to face the victor between Melvin Manhoef and Shungo Oyama to determine a tournament champion. However, during a hard sparring session for the upcoming bout Sakuraba began vomiting and fainted. After being rushed to the hospital he was diagnosed with vertebrobasilar damage that restricted blood circulation to the head and neck area. The doctors determined the damage was caused from years of untreated head injuries dating back to his college years.

==== K-1 Dynamite!!! ====
In spite of this revelation, rather than being granted a break to recover and possibly undergo surgery Sakuraba scheduled to return to action on December 31, 2006, against Yoshihiro Akiyama at K-1 Dynamite!!. During the bout, Sakuraba was hit with several punches and he rushed to get the takedown, but in doing so he slipped from Akiyama's body. As the sequence repeated itself over and over while Sakuraba took punishment, he opted to drop to his back and attempt a kneebar from there, but his grip on the judoka inexplicably failed again. Having Sakuraba trapped against the ropes and struggling for his submission, Akiyama was free to attack with ground and pound for the referee stoppage. Words were exchanged between Sakuraba and referee Yoshinori Umeki prior to the stop, which was brought on by the sounding of a bell at the behest of Akira Maeda, the event coordinator, the referee separating the fighters following the bell rather than initiating the stop himself.

Afterwards, the usually soft-spoken Sakuraba surprised many with complaints that Akiyama's body had been greased. The referee in charge subsequently checked Akiyama's body and gave indication to ringside officials that he had not found anything unusual. In the aftermath of the fight the controversy escalated drastically and new accusations of weighed gloves also surfaced. To deal with the growing controversy, K-1 launched an investigation to look into the accusations against Akiyama. Although Akiyama's gloves were found to be regulation, video-tape revealed Akiyama administering a lotion to his skin. Akiyama—who attested he was simply treating his dry skin—was found to have been "negligent" and disqualified. The fight was subsequently declared a no-contest and Akiyama's purse was withheld. A press conference followed, wherein Akiyama—now heavily maligned by the Japanese sports media—offered a public apology.

Although Sakuraba wore a shirt into the ring against Akiyama which read "K Sakuraba: End of Service", his experience against Akiyama apparently changed his plans regarding retirement and at Heros 8 he submitted the winless Yurij Kiseliov by armbar.

Following that win, he would next share the mixed martial arts ring with his fellow shoot wrestler and UWFi alum, Kiyoshi Tamura. Once again donning the guise of his childhood hero, Tiger Mask, as he had to signal his exodus from Pride Fighting Championships to Heros, Sakuraba this time wore the mask to mark the occasion of his return to Pride at their final DSE promoted show, Kamikaze. Before the assembled crowd at the Saitama Super Arena—Pride's most frequented venue—Sakuraba and Tamura publicly voiced their willingness to meet in a Pride ring, before shaking hands and embracing. A bout between Tamura and Sakuraba had been one of Pride's most frequently promised match-ups, one that had never been delivered upon in spite of several efforts to put it together.

On 2 June 2007, Sakuraba rematched Royce Gracie in K-1 Dynamite!! USA. While Sakuraba knocked Gracie to the canvas in the opening seconds, the bout itself was fought at a relatively slow pace, with Kazushi scoring multiple takedowns and Gracie scoring a number of flailing kicks to the legs and face from the bottom, as well as standing knee strikes to Kazushi's injured and bandaged knee. The Japanese wrestler also besieged Gracie on the ground, finishing the bout having taken the back of Gracie and searching for an armbar. Royce won by unanimous decision, which many viewers and MMA sites disputed immediately on the feeling that Sakuraba won the fight. Sherdog scored it 29–28 in favor of the Japanese fighter. Moreover, Gracie tested positive for steroids after the bout.

==== Sakuraba versus Funaki ====
Sakuraba returned to the ring on 17 September 2007 at K-1 Hero's 10 against former NJPW pro wrestler Katsuyori Shibata. Prior to the bout, Shibata's trainer, Masakatsu Funaki had challenged Sakuraba on the basis that their styles would make for an entertaining contest. Shibata came out striking aggressively, but was soon taken to the canvas by Sakuraba's trademark single leg. Shibata unleashed a torrent of blows off his back, but the more experienced Sakuraba responded with strikes of his own before transitioning into an armbar and finishing the bout.

Following his victory, Sakuraba praised the fighting spirit of Shibata and accepted Funaki's challenge. Much like Sakuraba, Funaki was trained in shoot wrestling and emerged into the world of mixed martial arts on the heels of a career in the UWF (the direct predecessor of Sakuraba's UWF International). Both men also held in common a past history of submission wins over world-class opposition and recognition as two of the top Japanese mixed martial artists to date. Appropriately, their bout took place in the main event of K-1's year end Dynamite!! show, which garners more TV viewers each year than any other televised mixed martial arts event in Japan. The two fighters exchanged colourful entrances at the arena, Sakuraba's featuring him and baseball player Tsuyoshi Shimoyanagi dressed in identical fighting gears and Ultraman masks.

Once in the match, Sakuraba was able to sneak in a double leg takedown after Funaki committed heavily to a missed right cross. Funaki closed guard around Sakuraba before opening it up to spin for a kneebar, and for a moment Funaki appeared to secure Sakuraba's leg, but he was thwarted by a combination of Sakuraba's submission acumen and their position against the ring ropes. Sakuraba then maneuvered to Funaki's back, only for the Pancrase founder to roll back into the guard position. Breaking away momentarily from the grappling contest, Sakuraba stood up and began to assault Funaki's legs with a series of kicks, which Funaki answered with an upkick of his own, cutting Sakuraba's eye. Kazushi then returned himself to the ground, where Funaki immediately attempted to sweep him, but Sakuraba blocked the attempt and secured a Kimura lock or double wristlock, eventually forcing Funaki to submit.

After the match, event producer Sadaharu Tanikawa spoke about a possible matchup between Sakuraba and Rickson Gracie the next year, which the former approved. However, nothing came from it.

=== Dream ===
In 2008, it was announced that Kazushi Sakuraba would compete in the Middleweight Grand Prix of the new MMA promotion, Dream. On 29 April 2008, Sakuraba defeated Andrews Nakahara in the main event at Dream 2: Middle Weight Grandprix 2008 1st Round. However, he was knocked out (and thus eliminated from the tournament) by Melvin Manhoef in the main event of Dream 4: Middle Weight Grandprix 2008 2nd Round. During the match, Sakuraba suffered an ulnar fracture of the left forearm, which was caused by a kick from Manhoef.

Finally it was announced that Kiyoshi Tamura and Kazushi Sakuraba were set to fight at the K-1 Dynamite!! 2008 event on December 31. The fight featured Sakuraba fighting mostly from his back, attempting armbars, kneebars and triangle chokes from his guard while Tamura defended them and applied ground and pound. At the end of the first round, Sakuraba appeared to have an armbar locked in, but the bell sounded before he could extend the arm. Tamura held on at the second, controlling much of the action and consistently kicking Sakuraba's injured legs; he was taken down in the final minute by Sakuraba, who immediately launched a barrage of punches, only for the bell to end his attacks again. Ultimately, Tamura was awarded a unanimous decision.

After his return to Dream, Sakuraba defeated boxer turned mixed martial artist Rubin Williams at Dream 11, before facing Croatian Zelg Galesic on Dream 12. Sakuraba took Galesic to the ground via single leg takedown and he immediately transitioned to a leg lock. Galesic tried to defend himself against the submission by raining punches on Sakuraba. Sakuraba absorbed the punches and held on to Galesic's leg until he successfully made the Croatian tap out due to a kneebar.

On May 29 he faced Ralek Gracie, at the Saitama Super Arena in Dream 14. It would be the sixth time Sakuraba faced a Gracie, albeit this time with a deep age difference, given the Japanese (41) and the Brazilian (24)'s respective ages. During the match, the wrestler performed significantly against the young Gracie, but the latter kept dominating, evidencing a training specialized to counter Sakuraba's style. There was controversy towards the end of the fight, as Sakuraba seemed to have secured a kimura, only to the referee to pause the match to pull up Ralek's pants. The pause allowed the Brazilian to come back with an armbar, which Kazushi escaped to meet a unanimous decision win for Gracie.

On September 25, at Dream 16, Sakuraba lost to Jason "Mayhem" Miller via arm triangle choke.

Sakuraba fought for the Dream Welterweight Championship against current champion Marius Zaromskis at Dynamite!! 2010 in December 2010. The fight ended in doctor stoppage, Sakuraba's ear was partially ripped off.

Sakuraba fought against undefeated Brazilian jiu-jitsu Black Belt Yan Cabral at Dream 17, losing via head arm triangle. This was Sakuraba's 6th loss in his last 8 fights.

=== Rizin Fighting Federation ===
On October 8, 2015, new Japanese mixed martial arts promotion Rizin Fighting Federation announced at a press conference that Sakuraba would face fellow Japanese fighter and grappler Shinya Aoki on the December 29, 2015. This was Sakuraba's first fight after taking four years away from the sport. Sakuraba lost the fight via TKO at 5:56 in the first round, after being taken down and receiving ground and pound.

== Submission grappling ==
=== Metamoris ===
On November 22, 2014, Sakuraba fought Renzo Gracie in a grappling match in Metamoris V. Renzo played defensive closed guard earlier in the match, with the two exchanging guillotine choke attempts, but he eventually flipped Sakuraba over and pinned him. However, Sakuraba resisted all of his submission attempts, and with 90 seconds left he scrambled and tried to lock a Kimura, which was unsuccessful. The fight ended in a draw.

=== Rizin ===
On October 15, 2017, Sakuraba fought former UFC champion Frank Shamrock at RIZIN fighting world grand Prix 2017 Autumn: Aki Jin event in Fukuoka, Japan for a grappling exhibition march at 84 kg division. The match ended with a draw decision.

=== Quintet ===
In April 2018, Sakuraba announced the formation of a submission wrestling promotion named Quintet (grappling). Based on five-man teams, it is fought under a kachi-nuki-shiai tournament format similar to Nanatei Judo. He competed in the inaugural event, but his team was eliminated in the semi-final round.

Sakuraba competed at Quintet 4 on September 10, 2023, where he would captain his own team, Team Sakuraba. Sakuraba drew his only match and his team went out in the opening round.

== Fighting style ==
Sakuraba became known for a unique, unorthodox fighting style which has been described as creative and compared to "throwing all we'd thought we'd learned about martial arts on its head." He employed moves and techniques from professional wrestling, among them spinning sole kicks, jumping stomps, Mongolian chops and baseball slides. He also used cartwheels to pass guard and several kinds of confusing, often comical tricks to gain advantage over his opponent. However, his main strength was his rounded set of abilities developed from shoot-style wrestling, which included a grinding striking learned from Muay Thai and a brilliant catch wrestling submission expertise. He submitted important grapplers of his time like Royler Gracie, Renzo Gracie and Masakatsu Funaki by using his signature double top wrist lock, a technique he opened both from standing and on the ground. Though he wasn't afraid of giving his back to his opponent in order to secure it, Sakuraba would also use the technique as a positional weapon, threatening with it to control his adversary. Renzo Gracie praised his ability to play against his opponent's weaknesses, Antônio Rodrigo Nogueira commended his technical skill, and Mark Kerr called him the world's best technician of his era.

== Personal life ==
Sakuraba is married and has a son. He is an atheist.

He has never cared much about diet and admits to drinking alcohol and being a smoker. Regarding the notable differences in weight between himself and his opponents throughout his career, as well as the banning of IVs for rehydration (and potential PED usage), Sakuraba has stated through an interpreter that "it doesn't matter if they [the opponent] use a pill or medicine to get bigger or smaller, I just train hard, eat healthy, fight at my weight and try my best to beat them. For me it doesn't matter if they use drugs, but I would not use it. I'm sure it's bad if they use it to win."

About his proneness to fight outside his weight class, Sakuraba declared "the more impossible the fights got, the more willing to accept them I became". Although he once desired to fight him, he later cited Fedor Emelianenko as the only fighter he ever refused to fight.

In June 2021, Sakuraba was a torch bearer for the 2020 Summer Olympics.

== Championships and accomplishments ==
=== Amateur wrestling ===
- National championship runner-up (high school)
- East Japan freshman championship
- All Japan university wrestling championships (fourth place)

=== Mixed martial arts ===
- Pride Fighting Championships
  - 2000 Pride Openweight Grand Prix semi-finalist
  - Longest fight in Pride FC history – Pride Grand Prix 2000 Finals (90:00)
  - Tied (Antônio Rodrigo Nogueira) for most submission wins in PRIDE FC history (11)
  - Most total fight time in PRIDE FC history (7 hours 15 mins)
  - Tied (Wanderlei Silva) for second most decision wins in PRIDE FC history (6)
  - Tied (Igor Vovchanchyn) for second Most bouts in PRIDE FC history (27) (behind Wanderlei Silva)
  - Tied (Igor Vovchanchyn & Mirko Cro Cop) for second most wins in PRIDE FC history (18) (behind Wanderlei Silva)
- Ultimate Fighting Championship
  - UFC Hall of Fame (Pioneer wing, Class of 2017)
  - UFC Japan Heavyweight Tournament winner
  - First Asian tournament winner in UFC history
  - First Japanese tournament winner in UFC history
  - UFC Encyclopedia Awards
    - Fight of the Night (one time) vs. Marcus Silveira
- Sherdog
  - Mixed Martial Arts Hall of Fame
- Wrestling Observer Newsletter
  - Wrestling Observer Newsletter Hall of Fame (Class of 2004)
  - 2001 Best Box Office Draw
  - 2001 Feud of the Year (vs. Wanderlei Silva)
  - 2000 Best Shootfighter
  - 2000 Best Shoot Match (vs. Royce Gracie)
- Tokyo Sports
  - Most Valuable Player (2000)
  - Outstanding Performance (1999)

=== Professional wrestling ===
- Kingdom
  - Kingdom One Million Yen Tournament (1997)
- Nikkan Sports
  - Outstanding Performance Award (1999)
  - Wrestler of the Year (2000)
- Pro Wrestling Illustrated
  - Ranked No. 238 of the top 500 singles wrestlers in the PWI 500 in 2017
- Pro Wrestling Noah
  - GHC Tag Team Championship (1 time) – with Takashi Sugiura
- Tokyo Sports
  - Best Tag Team Award (2020) – with Takashi Sugiura

== Mixed martial arts record ==
Professional record breakdown
46 matches	26 wins	17 losses
By knockout	4	10
By submission	19	3
By decision	3	4
Draws	1	
No contests	2	

Res.	Record	Opponent	Method	Event	Date	Round	Time	Location	Notes
Loss	26–17–1 (2)	Shinya Aoki	TKO (corner stoppage)	Rizin World Grand Prix 2015: Part 1 - Saraba	December 29, 2015	1	5:56	Saitama, Japan	
Loss	26–16–1 (2)	Yan Cabral	Submission (arm-triangle choke)	Dream 17	September 24, 2011	2	2:42	Saitama, Japan	
Loss	26–15–1 (2)	Marius Žaromskis	TKO (doctor stoppage)	Dynamite!! 2010	December 31, 2010	1	2:16	Saitama, Japan	Return to Welterweight. For the Dream Welterweight Championship.
Loss	26–14–1 (2)	Jason Miller	Submission (arm-triangle choke)	Dream 16	September 25, 2010	1	2:09	Nagoya, Japan	
Loss	26–13–1 (2)	Ralek Gracie	Decision (unanimous)	Dream 14	May 29, 2010	3	5:00	Saitama, Japan	Catchweight (192 lb) bout.
Win	26–12–1 (2)	Zelg Galešić	Submission (kneebar)	Dream 12	October 25, 2009	1	1:40	Osaka, Japan	
Win	25–12–1 (2)	Rubin Williams	Submission (kimura)	Dream 11	October 6, 2009	1	2:53	Yokohama, Japan	
Loss	24–12–1 (2)	Kiyoshi Tamura	Decision (unanimous)	Dynamite!! 2008	December 31, 2008	2	5:00	Saitama, Japan	
Loss	24–11–1 (2)	Melvin Manhoef	TKO (punches)	Dream 4	June 15, 2008	1	1:30	Yokohama, Japan	2008 Dream Middleweight Grand Prix Quarterfinal.
Win	24–10–1 (2)	Andrews Nakahara	Submission (neck crank)	Dream 2	April 29, 2008	1	8:20	Saitama, Japan	2008 Dream Middleweight Grand Prix Opening round.
Win	23–10–1 (2)	Masakatsu Funaki	Submission (kimura)	K-1 PREMIUM 2007 Dynamite!!	December 31, 2007	1	6:25	Osaka, Japan	Light Heavyweight bout.
Win	22–10–1 (2)	Katsuyori Shibata	Submission (armbar)	Hero's 10	September 17, 2007	1	6:20	Yokohama, Japan	
Loss	21–10–1 (2)	Royce Gracie	Decision (unanimous)	Dynamite!! USA	June 2, 2007	3	5:00	Los Angeles, California United States	Gracie tested positive for anabolic steroids after match. The judges' original decision was not overturned.
Win	21–9–1 (2)	Yurij Kiselov	Submission (triangle armbar)	Hero's 8	March 12, 2007	1	1:26	Nagoya, Japan	
NC	20–9–1 (2)	Yoshihiro Akiyama	NC (overturned)	K-1 PREMIUM 2006 Dynamite!!	December 31, 2006	1	5:37	Osaka, Japan	Return to Middleweight. Originally a TKO (punches) win for Akiyama; overturned after he found to have applied lotion to his body.
Win	20–9–1 (1)	Kestutis Smirnovas	Submission (armbar)	Hero's 6	August 5, 2006	1	6:41	Tokyo, Japan	Light Heavyweight debut. 2006 Hero's Light Heavyweight Grand Prix Quarterfinal.
Win	19–9–1 (1)	Ikuhisa Minowa	Technical submission (kimura)	Pride Shockwave 2005	December 31, 2005	1	9:59	Saitama, Japan	Welterweight debut.
Win	18–9–1 (1)	Ken Shamrock	TKO (punches)	Pride 30	October 23, 2005	1	2:27	Saitama, Japan	
Loss	17–9–1 (1)	Ricardo Arona	TKO (corner stoppage)	Pride Critical Countdown 2005	June 26, 2005	2	5:00	Saitama, Japan	2005 Pride Middleweight Grand Prix Quarterfinal.
Win	17–8–1 (1)	Yoon Dong-sik	KO (punches)	Pride Total Elimination 2005	April 23, 2005	1	0:38	Osaka, Japan	2005 Pride Middleweight Grand Prix Opening round.
Win	16–8–1 (1)	Nino Schembri	Decision (unanimous)	Pride Critical Countdown 2004	June 20, 2004	3	5:00	Saitama, Japan	
Loss	15–8–1 (1)	Antônio Rogério Nogueira	Decision (unanimous)	Pride Shockwave 2003	December 31, 2003	3	5:00	Saitama, Japan	
Win	15–7–1 (1)	Kevin Randleman	Submission (armbar)	Pride Final Conflict 2003	November 9, 2003	3	2:36	Tokyo, Japan	
Loss	14–7–1 (1)	Wanderlei Silva	KO (punch)	Pride Total Elimination 2003	August 10, 2003	1	5:01	Saitama, Japan	Pride 2003 Middleweight Grand Prix Opening round.
Loss	14–6–1 (1)	Nino Schembri	KO (knees and soccer kicks)	Pride 25	March 16, 2003	1	6:15	Yokohama, Japan	
Win	14–5–1 (1)	Gilles Arsene	Submission (armbar)	Pride 23	November 24, 2002	3	2:08	Tokyo, Japan	
Loss	13–5–1 (1)	Mirko Cro Cop	TKO (doctor stoppage)	Pride Shockwave	August 28, 2002	2	5:00	Tokyo, Japan	Heavyweight bout.
Loss	13–4–1 (1)	Wanderlei Silva	TKO (doctor stoppage)	Pride 17	November 3, 2001	1	10:00	Tokyo, Japan	Middleweight debut. For the Pride Middleweight Championship.
Win	13–3–1 (1)	Quinton Jackson	Submission (rear-naked choke)	Pride 15	July 29, 2001	1	5:41	Saitama, Japan	
Loss	12–3–1 (1)	Wanderlei Silva	TKO (knees and soccer kicks)	Pride 13	March 25, 2001	1	1:38	Saitama, Japan	
Win	12–2–1 (1)	Ryan Gracie	Decision (unanimous)	Pride 12	December 23, 2000	1	10:00	Saitama, Japan	
Win	11–2–1 (1)	Shannon Ritch	Submission (achilles lock)	Pride 11	October 31, 2000	1	1:08	Osaka, Japan	
Win	10–2–1 (1)	Renzo Gracie	Technical submission (kimura)	Pride 10	August 27, 2000	2	9:43	Tokorozawa, Japan	
Loss	9–2–1 (1)	Igor Vovchanchyn	TKO (corner stoppage)	Pride Grand Prix 2000 Finals	May 1, 2000	1	15:00	Tokyo, Japan	2000 Pride Openweight Grand Prix Semifinal.
Win	9–1–1 (1)	Royce Gracie	TKO (corner stoppage)	Pride Grand Prix 2000 Finals	May 1, 2000	6	15:00	Tokyo, Japan	2000 Pride Openweight Grand Prix Quarterfinal. Rules modified for unlimited rounds/no ref stoppages. After 90 minutes the fight was ended after six 15 minute rounds, three of them being overtime rounds.
Win	8–1–1 (1)	Guy Mezger	TKO (retirement)	Pride Grand Prix 2000 Opening Round	January 30, 2000	1	15:00	Tokyo, Japan	2000 Pride Openweight Grand Prix Opening round.
Win	7–1–1 (1)	Royler Gracie	Technical submission (kimura)	Pride 8	November 21, 1999	2	13:16	Tokyo, Japan	
Win	6–1–1 (1)	Anthony Macias	Submission (armbar)	Pride 7	September 12, 1999	2	2:30	Yokohama, Japan	
Win	5–1–1 (1)	Ebenezer Fontes Braga	Submission (armbar)	Pride 6	July 4, 1999	1	9:23	Yokohama, Japan	
Win	4–1–1 (1)	Vitor Belfort	Decision (unanimous)	Pride 5	April 29, 1999	2	10:00	Nagoya, Japan	
Draw	3–1–1 (1)	Allan Goes	Draw (time limit)	Pride 4	October 11, 1998	3	10:00	Tokyo, Japan	
Win	3–1 (1)	Carlos Newton	Submission (kneebar)	Pride 3	June 24, 1998	2	5:19	Tokyo, Japan	
Win	2–1 (1)	Vernon White	Submission (armbar)	Pride 2	March 15, 1998	3	6:53	Yokohama, Japan	
Win	1–1 (1)	Marcus Silveira	Submission (armbar)	UFC Japan: Ultimate Japan	December 21, 1997	1	3:44	Yokohama, Japan	Won the UFC Japan Heavyweight Tournament.
NC	0–1 (1)	Marcus Silveira	NC (premature stoppage)	UFC Japan: Ultimate Japan	December 21, 1997	1	1:51	Yokohama, Japan	Heavyweight debut. UFC Japan Heavyweight Tournament Semifinal. Originally a KO (punches) win for Silveira; overturned after review due to a referee error.
Loss	0–1	Kimo Leopoldo	Submission (arm-triangle choke)	Shoot Boxing – S-Cup 1996	July 14, 1996	1	4:20	Tokyo, Japan	Openweight bout.

=== Mixed rules ===
Professional record breakdown
1 match	1 win	0 losses
By submission	1	0

Res.	Record	Opponent	Method	Event	Date	Round	Time	Location	Notes
Win	1–0	Rene Rooze	Submission (toe hold)	UWF-i Scramble Wars	June 26, 1996	1	19:44	Nagoya, Aichi, Japan	

== Submission grappling record ==
Professional record breakdown
8 matches	1 win	2 losses
By submission	0	1
By decision	1	1
Draws	5	

Result	Opponent	Method	Event	Date	Round	Time	Notes
Loss	(Brazil) Gilbert Burns	Decision (points)	Quintet Ultra	December 12, 2019	1	N/A	
Win	(Japan) Takanori Gomi	Decision (points)	Quintet Fight Night 4	November 30, 2019	1	N/A	
Exhibition	(Japan) Wataru Miki	Exhibition	Quintet Fight Night 2	February 3, 2019	1	5:00	
Loss	(United States) Richie Martinez	Submission (D'Arce choke)	Quintet II	July 15, 2018	1	N/A	
Draw	(United Kingdom) Dan Strauss	Draw	Quintet	April 11, 2018	1	10:00	
Draw	(Japan) Shutaro Debana	Draw	Quintet	April 11, 2018	1	10:00	
Draw	(United States) Frank Shamrock	Draw	Rizin World Grand Prix Opening Round Part 2	October 15, 2017	1	10:00	
Draw	(Brazil) Wanderlei Silva and (Japan) Kiyoshi Tamura	Draw	Rizin FF 1	2016	1	15:00	Partnered with (Japan) Hideo Tokoro.
Draw	(Brazil) Renzo Gracie	Draw	Metamoris V	2014	1	N/A	

== Filmography ==
Year	Title	Role	Notes
2005	Nagurimono	Ginkaku	
2009	Baton	Robot Guard	Voice
2018	Mutafukaz	El Diablo	Voice; Japanese dubbing version

== See also ==
- List of male mixed martial artists
- List of professional wrestlers by MMA record
- List of UFC champions

== Additional sources ==
- Yu, Al (August 2, 2006). "Sakuraba and the Changing of the Guard". MMAWeekly.com. Archived from the original on September 29, 2007.
- Yu, Al (September 1, 2006). "Sakuraba Medically Cleared to Fight". MMAWeekly.com. Archived from the original on May 17, 2007.
- Yu, Al (January 2, 2007). "A Word from the Asian Sensation..." MMAWeekly.com. Archived from the original on May 14, 2007.
- Yu, Al (January 2, 2007). "Royce Gracie's Fine, Suspension Upheld by CSAC". MMAJunkie.com. Archived from the original on June 26, 2009.

Preceded by Mark Kerr	UFC Ultimate Japan Heavyweight tournament winner December 21, 1997	Succeeded by Pat Miletich
