= UFC Japan: Ultimate Japan =

UFC mixed martial arts event in 1997

- The poster for UFC Japan: Ultimate Japan
- Promotion: Ultimate Fighting Championship
- Date: December 21, 1997
- Venue: Yokohama Arena
- City: Yokohama, Japan
- Attendance: 5,000

Event chronology
UFC 15: Collision Course	UFC Japan: Ultimate Japan	UFC 16: Battle in the Bayou

UFC Japan: Ultimate Japan (also known as UFC Ultimate Japan or UFC 15.5) was a mixed martial arts event held by the Ultimate Fighting Championship on December 21, 1997, in Yokohama, Japan. The event was seen on pay per view in the United States, on cable TV in Japan, and was later released on home video.

== History ==
The event was arranged in partnership with Kingdom Professional Wrestling to capitalize on the popularity of shoot wrestling and the rapidly-growing Japanese MMA market, amid the emergence of promotions such as PRIDE, and was intended to serve as the inaugural event of a planned “Ultimate Japan” sub-brand, with plans for an eventual "UFC Japan" ran by local promoters. Although the UFC subsequently returned to Japan for Ultimate Japan 2 (UFC 23) in 1999 and Ultimate Japan 3 (UFC 25) in 2000, the planned sub-brand never developed into a regular series amid the UFC's financial difficulties and the increasingly competitive Japanese MMA market.

The event featured a four-man heavyweight tournament, the first ever UFC Middleweight Championship bout, a Heavyweight Championship bout, a Superfight and an alternate bout. Ultimate Japan 1 featured the first UFC appearance of MMA legends Kazushi Sakuraba and Frank Shamrock.

The event was the first appearance of longtime UFC announcer Mike Goldberg, who replaced Bruce Beck as the play by play announcer. Another notable first was the use of unique entry music for each fighter, though this was not repeated in UFC 16. Also, this UFC event was the first to be located in a country other than the United States or its territories.

=== Sakuraba's Tale ===
In an attempt to gain attention for the Japanese Kingdom Pro Wrestling, Hiromitsu Kanehara and Yoji Anjo signed on to compete in the Ultimate Fighting Championship's Ultimate Japan tournament. As fate would have it, Kanehara was injured in his training for the tournament, and Kazushi Sakuraba wound up as his late hour substitute. The tournament was intended for heavyweights, and Sakuraba, at 183 pounds, was nearly twenty pounds beneath the UFC's 200 pound designation for the weight class. Reporting himself as 203 pounds in order to gain entry, Sakuraba was paired off against the 243 pound Brazilian jiu-jitsu blackbelt and former Extreme Fighting champion, Marcus Silveira.

Following a barrage of blows by Silveira, Sakuraba dropped for a low-single, only for the fight to be prematurely ended on a KO. Referee John McCarthy had mistakenly thought Sakuraba to have been knocked out. A loud protest followed from the crowd and an angry Sakuraba attempted unsuccessfully to take the microphone and address the Japanese audience. However, after reviewing tape, McCarthy changed his decision to a no-contest. Tank Abbott, who had earlier defeated Yoji Anjo, dropped from the tournament due to an injured hand, leaving Sakuraba and Silveira to face off once more that night in what would be the championship bout of the tournament. This time, Sakuraba claimed the victory, submitting Silveira with an armbar. Afterwards, Sakuraba famously stated, "In fact, professional wrestling is strong".

== Results ==
UFC Heavyweight Championship
Weight class				Method	Round	Time	Notes
Heavyweight	Randy Couture	def.	Maurice Smith (c)	Decision (majority)	1	21:00	(Note: For the UFC Heavyweight Championship.)
Heavyweight Tournament Final
Heavyweight	Kazushi Sakuraba	def.	Marcus Silveira	Submission (armbar)	1	3:44	(Note: Due to the earlier no-contest, and Tank Abbott bowing out of the tournament, UFC officials ruled that a rematch between Sakuraba and Silveira would serve as the Heavyweight Tournament Finals.)
Heavyweight bout
Heavyweight	Vitor Belfort	def.	Joe Charles	Submission (armbar)	1	4:03
UFC Light Heavyweight Championship
Middleweight	Frank Shamrock	def.	Kevin Jackson	Submission (armbar)	1	0:22	(Note: For the inaugural UFC Light Heavyweight Championship.)
Heavyweight Tournament Semifinals
Heavyweight	Kazushi Sakuraba	vs.	Marcus Silveira	No Contest (premature stoppage)	1	1:51	(Note: Originally Silveira was thought to have knocked out Sakuraba at 1:51, but referee John McCarthy mistakenly stopped the bout early, with Sakuraba in good fighting condition. After a protest, the decision was changed to a no-contest.)
Heavyweight	Tank Abbott	def.	Yoji Anjo	Decision (unanimous)	1	15:00	(Note: Abbott was unable to continue in the tournament due to a broken hand.)
Heavyweight Alternate bout
Heavyweight	Tra Telligman	def.	Brad Kohler	Submission (armbar)	1	10:05

== UFC Japan Heavyweight Tournament bracket ==
Semifinals
(United States) Tank Abbott	DEC
(Japan) Yoji Anjo	15:00
(Japan) Kazushi Sakuraba	NC
(Brazil) Marcus Silveira	1:51

Finals
(Japan) Kazushi Sakuraba^{1}	SUB
(Brazil) Marcus Silveira	3:44

^{1} Due to the NC, and Tank Abbott bowing out of the tournament, UFC officials ruled that a rematch between Sakuraba and Silveira would serve as the Heavyweight Tournament Finals.

== Encyclopedia awards ==
The following fighters were honored in the October 2011 book titled UFC Encyclopedia.

- Fight of the Night: Kazushi Sakuraba vs. Marcus Silveira
- Submission of the Night: Frank Shamrock def. Kevin Jackson

== See also ==
- Ultimate Fighting Championship
- List of UFC champions
- List of UFC events
- 1997 in UFC
