= Yoon Dong-sik =

Korean MMA fighter (born 1972)

- Born: August 24, 1972 (age 54); Seoul, South Korea
- Height: 6 ft 0 in (1.83 m)
- Weight: 185 lb (84 kg; 13.2 st)
- Division: Middleweight; Light Heavyweight
- Style: MMA, Judo

Mixed martial arts record
- Total: 19
- Wins: 9
- By submission: 5
- By decision: 4
- Losses: 10
- By knockout: 6
- By decision: 4

Other information
- Mixed martial arts record from Sherdog
- Judo career
- Weight class: ‍–‍78 kg, ‍–‍81 kg, ‍–‍90 kg
- Rank: 3rd dan black belt
- Club: Team Yoon

Judo achievements and titles
- World Champ.: (bronze) (2001)
- Asian Champ.: (gold) (1994, 1997, 2000)
Medal record
Men's judo
Representing South Korea
World Championships
Bronze medal – third place	2001 Munich	‍–‍90 kg
Asian Games
Gold medal – first place	1994 Hiroshima	‍–‍78 kg
Asian Championships
Gold medal – first place	1997 Manila	‍–‍78 kg
Gold medal – first place	2000 Osaka	‍–‍90 kg
Bronze medal – third place	1993 Macau	‍–‍78 kg
World Juniors Championships
Silver medal – second place	1992 Buenos Aires	‍–‍78 kg
East Asian Games
Gold medal – first place	2001 Osaka	‍–‍90 kg

Profile at external judo databases
- IJF: 57096
- JudoInside.com: 3748

Korean name
- Hangul: 윤동식
- Hanja: 尹東植
- RR: Yun Dongsik
- MR: Yun Tongsik

Yoon Dong-Sik (Korean: 윤동식, born August 24, 1972, in Seoul), often anglicised to Dong-Sik Yoon, is a South Korean judoka, and mixed martial artist.

== Career ==
=== Judo ===
Before competing in MMA, Yoon was a well-known judoka with over 50 international judo competitions under his belt and had a winning streak of 47 straight victories without conceding a single koka, with notable wins over World champions and Olympic gold-medalists such as Makoto Takimoto, Mark Huizinga, Jeon Ki-Young and Toshihiko Koga. Despite his impressive résumé, Yoon never competed in the Olympics; hence he was given a nickname Judo King Without a Crown.

- 1992 World Youth Championships - 2nd place
- 1992 Italian Open - gold medal
- 1993 Asian Championships - 3rd place
- 1993 German Open - gold medal
- 1993 Paris Open - 2nd place
- 1993 Austrian Open - gold medal
- 1994 Austrian Open - gold medal
- 1994 Paris Open - gold medal
- 1994 Goodwill Games - gold medal
- 1994 Asian Games in Hiroshima - gold medal
- 1995 Paris Open - gold medal
- 1996 German Open - gold medal
- 1998 British Open - gold medal
- 1999 Iranian Open - gold medal
- 2000 Asian Championships - gold medal
- 2001 East Asian Games - gold medal
- 2001 World Championships - 3rd place

=== Mixed martial arts (2005–present) ===
Yoon made his MMA debut at PRIDE Total Elimination 2005 against legendary Japanese fighter Kazushi Sakuraba. It was a heavily anticipated matchup in both Japan and Korea due to the rivalry between the two nations and it was Sakuraba's comeback match after a ten month absence due to injuries. With a lack of MMA experience and knowledge, Yoon lost to Sakuraba only 38 seconds into the match. After the match, Yoon accepted the offer to join Sakuraba's Takada Dojo. Yoon tasted his first victory in MMA at the K-1 Dynamite!! USA event, where he scored a surprising submission win over heavily favored Dutch kickboxer Melvin Manhoef. Yoon went on to win his second consecutive fight at HERO'S by beating former Cage Rage champion Zelg Galesic by armbar after only 1 minute 29 seconds.

On October 28, 2007, Yoon also beat Fábio Silva by armbar submission making that his third win in K-1 Hero's, his third victory in MMA, and his third consecutive win by armbar. His newfound propensity for finishing opponents with an armbar has led to fans and journalists dubbing the move the "Dongbar" when performed by Yoon.

He was scheduled to face Paulo Filho on October 25, 2009, at DREAM.12, however Filho withdrew at the last minute for unknown reasons. Yoon then faced last minute replacement Tarec Saffiedine and won via split decision.

== Mixed martial arts record ==
Professional record breakdown
19 matches	9 wins	10 losses
By knockout	1	6
By submission	4	0
By decision	4	4

Res.	Record	Opponent	Method	Event	Date	Round	Time	Location	Notes
Loss	9–10	Ikuhisa Minowa	TKO (finger injury)	Road FC 042	Sep 23, 2017	2	2:26	Chungju, South Korea	Middleweight Match
Loss	9–9	Young Choi	KO (punch)	Road FC 031	May 14, 2016	2	2:38	Seoul, South Korea	Middleweight Match
Win	9–8	Daiju Takase	Decision (split)	Road FC 024	July 25, 2015	3	5:00	Tokyo, Japan	Middleweight Match
Win	8–8	Amilcar Alves	Decision (unanimous)	Road FC 019	November 9, 2014	3	5:00	Seoul, South Korea	Middleweight Match
Loss	7–8	Riki Fukuda	TKO (punches)	Road FC 016	July 26, 2014	1	3:36	Gumi, South Korea	Middleweight Match
Win	7–7	Yong-Hwan Jung	Submission (armbar)	Revolution 1 - The Return of Legend	March 23, 2013	1	0:46	Jeongseon, South Korea	Light Heavyweight Match
Win	6–7	Ryo Takigawa	TKO (corner stoppage)	K-1 Korea Max 2013	February 2, 2013	1	1:25	Seoul, South Korea	Middleweight Match
Win	5–7	Tarec Saffiedine	Decision (split)	Dream 12	October 25, 2009	3	5:00	Osaka, Japan	Middleweight Match
Loss	4–7	Jesse Taylor	TKO (foot injury)	Dream 10	July 20, 2009	1	1:02	Saitama, Japan	Middleweight Match
Loss	4–6	Andrews Nakahara	TKO (punches)	Dream 6: Middleweight Grand Prix 2008 Final Round	September 23, 2008	2	0:30	Saitama, Japan	GP 2005 Middleweight Tournament reserve bout
Loss	4–5	Gegard Mousasi	Decision (unanimous)	Dream 4: Middleweight Grand Prix 2008 Second Round	June 15, 2008	2	5:00	Yokohama, Japan	GP 2005 Middleweight Tournament Quarterfinal
Win	4–4	Shungo Oyama	Decision (unanimous)	Dream 2: Middleweight Grand Prix 2008 First Round	April 29, 2008	2	5:00	Saitama, Japan	GP 2005 Middleweight Tournament Round of 16
Win	3–4	Fábio Silva	Submission (armbar)	Hero's 2007 in Korea	October 28, 2007	1	6:12	Seoul, South Korea	Middleweight Match
Win	2–4	Zelg Galesic	Submission (armbar)	Hero's 10	September 17, 2007	1	1:29	Yokohama, Japan	
Win	1–4	Melvin Manhoef	Submission (armbar)	K-1 Dynamite!! USA HERO's	June 2, 2007	2	1:17	California, US	Middleweight Match
Loss	0–4	Murilo Bustamante	Decision (unanimous)	Pride - Bushido 13	November 5, 2006	2	5:00	Yokohama, Japan	Welterweight Match
Loss	0–3	Quinton Jackson	Decision (unanimous)	Pride 31 - Dreamers	February 26, 2006	3	5:00	Saitama, Japan	Middleweight Match
Loss	0–2	Makoto Takimoto	Decision (unanimous)	PRIDE 30 - Fully Loaded	October 23, 2005	3	5:00	Saitama, Japan	Middleweight Match
Loss	0–1	Kazushi Sakuraba	TKO (punches)	PRIDE Total Elimination 2005	April 23, 2005	1	0:38	Osaka, Japan	GP 2005 Middleweight Tournament Round of 16

== Submission grappling record ==
KO PUNCHES

Result	Opponent	Method	Event	Date	Round	Time	Notes
Loss	(Brazil) Marcos de Souza	Submission (armbar)	Quintet	April 11, 2018	1		
Win	(Japan) Hideo Tokoro	Submission (sode guruma jime)	Quintet	April 11, 2018	1		
