= Quintet (grappling) =

Japanese submission grappling promotion

- Type: Private
- Industry: Submission grappling promotion
- Founded: 2018
- Founder: Kazushi Sakuraba
- Headquarters: Japan
- Key people: Kazushi Sakuraba

Quintet (stylized as QUINTET) is a Japanese submission grappling promotion created by mixed martial artist Kazushi Sakuraba that uses a 5-on-5, winner-stays-on format. It debuted on April 11, 2018 on UFC Fight Pass.

Sakuraba developed Quintet with former UFC champion Josh Barnett. In July 2017, while in Las Vegas, Sakuraba pitched the concept of Quintet to Ant Evans, the content officer for UFC Fight Pass. Evans worked with Sakuraba to further develop the concept before ultimately signing Quintet to a long-term deal with UFC Fight Pass.

== Rules ==
=== Fight mat ===
In Quintet, bouts take place on a 12-meter by 12-meter (39 ft) square wrestling mat with no line boundaries. If the fighters move too close to the edge of the mat, the referee stops the bout and restarts it in a safe area of the mat with the fighters assuming the same positions they were in when the bout was stopped.

=== Winner-Stays-On System ===
The match begins with a bout between two fighters, one from each team. The winner fights the next fighter from the opposing team. If the bout ends in a draw, both fighters are removed and the next fighter from each team enters the mat to grapple. If the last fighter on a team loses their bout, that team loses. If a bout between both teams’ last fighters ends in a draw, whichever team had the fewest cumulative penalties throughout all of the bouts wins. If both teams have an equal number of penalties, the referees determine the winning team based on which fighter in the final bout was most aggressive.

=== Weight ===
The total weight of all five fighters on a team must be below the weight class limit as measured one day before the event.

Class name	Weight class limit (kg)	
Class name	Men	Women
Regular	430 kg (950 lb)	280 kg (620 lb)
Light	360 kg (790 lb)	—

=== Time Limits ===
Each bout consists of one 8-minute round if the fighters are close in weight. If the difference in the fighters’ weights is more than 20 kilograms (44 lb) in the Regular class or 10 kilograms (22 lb) in the Lightweight class, the lighter fighter may choose between an 8- or 4-minute round.

== List of winners ==
Weight Class	Winner	Runner-up	Event	Date	Tournament Bracket
Regular	(United Kingdom) Polaris	(Japan) HALEO	Quintet 1	April 11, 2018	Quintet 1 Bracket
Light	(Japan) Carpe Diem	(Japan) HALEO	Quintet Fight Night 1	June 9, 2018	Quintet Fight Night 1 Bracket
Regular	(United States) 10th Planet	(Japan) Reebok	Quintet 2	July 16, 2018	Quintet 2 Bracket
Regular	(United States) Alpha Male	(United Kingdom) Polaris	Quintet 3	October 5, 2018	Quintet 3 Bracket
Regular	(Japan) Carpe Diem	(Japan) Neo Judo	Quintet Fight Night 2	February 3, 2019	Quintet Fight Night 2 Bracket
Female Regular	(United States) 10th Planet	(Japan) BJJ Kunoichi	Quintet Fight Night 3	April 7, 2019	Quintet Fight Night 3 Bracket
Light	(Japan) Carpe Diem	(Japan) Sakuraba	Quintet Fight Night 4	November 30, 2019	Quintet Fight Night 4 Bracket
Regular	Team UFC	Team Strikeforce	Quintet Ultra	December 12, 2019	Quintet Ultra Bracket
Light	(Japan) Tokoro Plus α 2nd	(Japan) Carpe Diem	Quintet Fight Night 5	October 27, 2020	Quintet Fight Night 5 Bracket
Female Regular	(Japan) Carpe Diem	(Japan) Fairtex	Quintet Fight Night 6	March 12, 2021	Quintet Fight Night 6 Bracket
Light	(Japan) Wolf	(Japan) The Body Ride	Quintet Fight Night 7	July 13, 2021	Quintet Fight Night 7 Bracket
Regular	(United States) The B-Team Bulls	(United States) Team 10th Planet	Quintet 4	September 10, 2023	Quintet 4 Bracket

== Events ==
#	Event	Date	Venue	Location
1	QUINTET 1	April 11, 2018	Ryogoku Kokugikan	Tokyo, Japan
2	QUINTET Fight Night 1	June 9, 2018	Differ Ariake	Tokyo, Japan
3	QUINTET 2	July 16, 2018	Ota City General Gymnasium	Tokyo, Japan
4	QUINTET 3	October 5, 2018	Orleans Arena	Las Vegas, United States
5	QUINTET Fight Night 2	February 3, 2019	Arena Tachikawa Tachihi	Tokyo, Japan
6	QUINTET Fight Night 3	April 7, 2019	Arena Tachikawa Tachihi	Tokyo, Japan
7	QUINTET Fight Night 4	November 30, 2019	Akita City Cultural Center	Akita, Japan
8	QUINTET Ultra	December 12, 2019	Red Rock Casino	Las Vegas, United States
9	QUINTET Fight Night 5	October 27, 2020	Korakuen Hall	Tokyo, Japan
10	QUINTET Fight Night 6	March 12, 2021	Ex Theater Roppongi	Tokyo, Japan
11	QUINTET Fight Night 7	July 13, 2021	Korakuen Hall	Tokyo, Japan
12	QUINTET.4 ReBOOT	September 10, 2023	Yokohama Arena	Tokyo, Japan
13	QUINTET 5	October 23, 2025	Coca-Cola Arena	Dubai, United Arab Emirates
14	QUINTET 6	July 25, 2026	Butokuden	Kyoto, Japan

=== Quintet 1 ===
Quintet 1
- Promotion: Quintet
- Date: April 11, 2018
- Venue: Ryōgoku Kokugikan
- City: Tokyo, Japan

Quintet 1 was a team grappling event held by Quintet on April 11, 2018, at the Ryōgoku Kokugikan in Tokyo, Japan.

==== Teams ====
Haleo Dream Team

- (Japan) Kazushi Sakuraba
- (United States) Josh Barnett
- (Japan) Daisuke Nakamura
- (Japan) Hideo Tokoro
- (Brazil) Marcos Yoshio Souza

Polaris Dream Team

- (Brazil) Gregor Gracie
- (Poland) Marcin Held
- (Australia) Craig Jones
- (England) Dan Strauss
- (Japan) Caol Uno

Judo Dream Team

- (Japan) Satoshi Ishii
- (South Korea) Yoon Dong-sik
- (Japan) Michihiro Omigawa
- (South Korea) Kim Hyung-ju
- (Japan) Shutaro Debana

Sambo Dream Team

- (Lithuania) Teodoras Aukstuolis
- (Lithuania) Marius Žaromskis
- (Lithuania) Mindaugas Verzbickas
- (Lithuania) Sergej Grecicho
- (Lithuania) Viktor Tomasevic

==== Quintet 1 Bracket ====
Semi Finals
1	(Japan) Team Haleo	2
(Japan) Team Judo	0
2	(United Kingdom) Team Polaris	3
(Lithuania) Team Sambo	0

Finals
3	(Japan) Team Haleo	0
(United Kingdom) Team Polaris	2

=== Quintet Fight Night 1 ===
Quintet Fight Night 1
- Promotion: Quintet
- Date: June 9, 2018
- Venue: Differ Ariake
- City: Tokyo, Japan

Quintet Fight Night 1 was a team grappling survival event held by Quintet on June 9, 2018, at the Differ Ariake in Tokyo, Japan.

==== Teams ====
Team Carpe Diem

- (Japan) Masahiro Iwasaki
- (Japan) Daisuke Sugie
- (Japan) Tomoshige Sera
- (Japan) Yoshihiko Matsumoto
- (United States) David Garmo

Team U-Zukido

- (Japan) Daisuke Nakamura
- (Japan) Manabu Inoue
- (United States) Victor Henry
- (Japan) Masayuki Hamagishi
- (Japan) Hikaru Sato

Team TOKORO PLUS α

- (Japan) Hideo Tokoro
- (Japan) Takumi Yano
- (Japan) Masakazu Imanari
- (Japan) Naoyuki Kotani
- (Japan) Seiichiro Ito

Team Haleo

- (Brazil) Roberto Satoshi Souza
- (Japan) Michihiro Omigawa
- (Japan) Masanori Kanehara
- (Japan) Kazuyuki Miyata
- (Japan) Kazuki Tokudome

==== Quintet Fight Night 1 Bracket ====
Semi Finals
1	(Japan) Carpe Diem	ADV
(Japan) TOKORO PLUS α	0
2	(Japan) U-Zukido	0
(Japan) Haleo	3

Finals
3	(Japan) Carpe Diem	ADV
(Japan) Haleo	0

=== Quintet 2 ===
Quintet 2
- Promotion: Quintet
- Date: July 16, 2018
- Venue: Ota City General Gymnasium
- City: Tokyo, Japan

Quintet 2 was a team grappling event held by Quintet on July 16, 2018, at the Ota City General Gymnasium in Tokyo, Japan.

==== Teams ====
Team Tiger Muay Thai

- (England) Stuart Cooper
- (Belgium) Christophe Vandijck
- (Syria) Tarek Suleiman
- (United States) Alex Schild
- (Hong Kong) Viking Wong

Team 10th Planet

- (United States) Geo Martinez
- (United States) Richie Martinez
- (United States) PJ Barch
- (United States) Adam Sachnoff
- (United States) Amir Allam

Team Reebok

- (Japan) Kazushi Sakuraba
- (Japan) Hideo Tokoro
- (Japan) Daisuke Nakamura
- (South Korea) Yoon Dong-sik
- (Ghana) Haisam Rida

Team Vagabond

- (Japan) Satoshi Ishii
- (Belarus) Andrei Kazusionak
- (Brazil) João Assis
- (Poland) Krzysiek Suchorabski
- (Georgia (country)) Mikheil Dopidze

==== Quintet 2 Bracket ====
Semi Finals
1	(Thailand) Tiger Muay Thai	0
(Japan) Team Reebok	3
2	(United States) Team 10th Planet	ADV
(Japan) Team Vagabond	0

Finals
3	(Japan) Team Reebok	0
(United States) Team 10th Planet	2

=== Quintet 3 ===
Quintet 3
- Promotion: Quintet
- Date: October 5, 2018
- Venue: Orleans Arena
- City: Las Vegas, USA

Quintet 3 was a team grappling survival event held by Quintet on October 5, 2018, at the Orleans Arena in Las Vegas, USA.

==== Teams ====
Team Alpha Male

- (United States) Urijah Faber
- (Brazil) Antoine Jaoude
- (United States) Gordon Ryan
- (United States) Mansher Khera
- (United States) Dustin Akbari

Team 10th Planet

- (United States) PJ Barch
- (United States) Amir Allam
- (United States) Geo Martinez
- (United States) Richie Martinez
- (United States) Adam Sachnoff

Team Sakuraba

- (Japan) Kazushi Sakuraba
- (Japan) Daisuke Nakamura
- (United States) Josh Barnett
- (Brazil) Marcos Yoshio Souza
- (Brazil) Roberto Satoshi Souza

Team Polaris

- (Brazil) Vítor Ribeiro
- (Brazil) Gregor Gracie
- (Poland) Marcin Held
- (Australia) Craig Jones
- (England) Dan Strauss

==== Super Matches ====
Quintet 3
Weight Class				Method	Round	Time	Notes
Bantamweight 66 kg	(United States) Nicky Ryan	def.	(Japan) Hideo Tokoro	Submission (Rear-Naked Choke)			
Light Heavyweight 93 kg	(Brazil) Marcelo Nunes	def.	(Ghana) Haisam Rida	Submission (Arm-Triangle Choke)			
Heavyweight 120 kg	(Japan) Satoshi Ishii	def.	(United States) Frank Mir	DQ (Stalling)			

==== Quintet 3 Bracket ====
Semi Finals
1	(United States) Team Alpha Male	3
(Japan) Team Sakuraba	0
2	(United States) Team 10th Planet	0
(United Kingdom) Team Polaris	2

Finals
3	(United States) Team Alpha Male	2
(United Kingdom) Team Polaris	0

=== Quintet Fight Night 2 ===
Quintet Fight Night 2
- Promotion: Quintet
- Date: February 3, 2019
- Venue: Arena Tachikawa Tachihi
- City: Tokyo, Japan

Quintet Fight Night 2 was a team grappling survival event held by Quintet on February 3, 2019, at the Arena Tachikawa Tachihi in Tokyo, Japan.

==== Teams ====
Team Neo Judo

- (Japan) Michihiro Omigawa
- (Japan) Shutaro Debana
- (Japan) Yoshiyuki Yoshida
- (Japan) Koshi Matsumoto
- (Japan) Yukiyasu Ozawa

Team Carpe Diem

- (Ghana) Haisam Rida
- (Japan) Sotaro Yamada
- (France) Thomas Mietz
- (United States) David Garmo
- (France) Reda Mebtouche

Team U-Japan

- (Japan) Tsuyoshi Kosaka
- (Japan) Hideo Tokoro
- (Japan) Daisuke Nakamura
- (Japan) Ikuhisa Minowa
- (Japan) Hirotaka Yokoi

Team Soldier

- (Japan) Hideki Sekine
- (Japan) Yuta Nakamura
- (Brazil) Sergio Rios Da Silva
- (Australia) Declan Moody
- (Brazil) Igor Tanabe

==== Quintet Fight Night 2 Bracket ====
Semi Finals
(Japan) Team Neo Judo
Team U-Japan
(Japan) Team Carpe Diem
(Japan) Team Soldier

Finals
(Japan) Team Neo Judo
(Japan) Team Carpe Diem

=== Quintet Fight Night 3 ===
Quintet Fight Night 3
- Promotion: Quintet
- Date: April 7, 2019
- Venue: Arena Tachikawa Tachihi
- City: Tokyo, Japan

Quintet Fight Night 3 was a team grappling survival event held by Quintet on April 7, 2019, at the Arena Tachikawa Tachihi in Tokyo, Japan. It was the first Quintet event to feature women's grappling.

==== Teams ====
Team BJJ Kunoichi

- (Japan) Rikako Yuasa
- (Japan) Iori Echigo
- (Japan) Nanami Ichikawa
- (Japan) Yuki Sugiuchi
- (Japan) Akiko Sawada

Team DEEP Jewels

- (Japan) Tomo Maesawa
- (Japan) Emi Tomimatsu
- (Japan) Reina Miura
- (Japan) Yukari Nabe
- (Japan) Hikaru Aono

Team Sun Chlorella

- (Japan) Miyuu Yamamoto
- (United States) Sara McMann
- (Japan) Mika Nagano
- (Japan) Megumi Sugimoto
- (Japan) Miyuu Ikemoto

Team 10th Planet

- (United States) Lila Smadja-Cruz
- (United States) Fabiana Jorge
- (United States) Liz Carmouche
- (United States) Grace Gundrum
- (Finland) Elvira Karppinen

==== Quintet Fight Night 3 Bracket ====
Semi Finals
(United States) Team 10th Planet
(Japan) Team DEEP Jewels
(Japan) Team Sun Chlorella
(Japan) Team BJJ Kunoichi

Finals
(United States) Team 10th Planet
(Japan) Team BJJ Kunoichi

=== Quintet Fight Night 4 ===
Quintet Fight Night 4
- Promotion: Quintet
- Date: November 30, 2019
- Venue: Akita City Cultural Center
- City: Akita, Japan

Quintet Fight Night 4 was a team grappling survival event held by Quintet on November 30, 2019, at the Akita City Cultural Center in Akita, Japan.

==== Teams ====
Team Paraestra

- (Japan) Kohei Yasumi
- (Japan) Ayumu Shioda
- (Japan) Yutaka Saito
- (Japan) Yusuke Honma
- (Japan) Shoki Higuchi

Team Sakuraba

- (Japan) Daisuke Nakamura
- (Japan) Yuji Hoshino
- (Japan) Shutaro Debana
- (Japan) Kazuhiro Suzuki
- (Japan) Yoichi Fukumoto

Team K-Top BJJ

- (South Korea) Inseong Jang
- (South Korea) Wanki Chae
- (South Korea) Gyeongseop Lee
- (South Korea) Youngseung Cho
- (South Korea) Jun Yong Cho

Team Carpe Diem

- (Japan) Masahiro Iwasaki
- (Japan) Tomoshige Sera
- (Japan) Sotaro Yamada
- (Japan) Yukinari Tamura
- (Japan) Tomoyuki Hashimoto

==== Quintet Fight Night 4 Bracket ====
Semi Finals
(Japan) Team Carpe Diem
(South Korea) Team K-Top BJJ
(Japan) Team Sakuraba
(Japan) Team Paraestra

Finals
(Japan) Team Carpe Diem
(Japan) Team Sakuraba

=== Quintet Ultra ===
Quintet Ultra
- Promotion: Quintet
- Date: December 12, 2019
- Venue: Red Rock Casino
- City: Las Vegas, USA

Quintet Ultra was a team grappling survival event held by Quintet on December 12, 2019, at the Red Rock Casino in Las Vegas, USA. This event was based around teams representing four MMA promotions: the UFC, Pride Fighting Championships, Strikeforce, and World Extreme Cagefighting. Participants were selected based on how closely linked their careers were to those promotions.

==== Teams ====
Team UFC

- (United States) Anthony Smith
- (United States) Anthony Johnson
- (United States) Sean O'Malley
- (United States) Clay Guida
- (Brazil) Gilbert Burns

Team Strikeforce

- (United States) Gilbert Melendez
- (United States) Jake Shields
- (United States) Muhammed Lawal
- (Brazil) Gesias Cavalcante
- (Brazil) Renato Sobral

Team Pride FC

- (Japan) Kazushi Sakuraba
- (Japan) Takanori Gomi
- (Brazil) Gregor Gracie
- (Cuba) Héctor Lombard
- (The Bahamas) Yves Edwards

Team WEC

- (United States) Chad Mendes
- (Brazil) Glover Teixeira
- (Philippines) Mark Muñoz
- (United States) Cub Swanson
- (United States) James Krause

==== Quintet Ultra bracket ====
Semi Finals
1	Team UFC	3
Team PRIDE	2
2	Team Strikeforce	2
Team WEC	1

Finals
3	Team UFC	1
Team Strikeforce	0

==== Super Matches ====
Quintet Ultra
Weight Class				Method	Round	Time	Notes
Heavyweight (120 kg (260 lb))	(United States) Gordon Ryan	def.	(Russia) Aleksei Oleinik	Submission (kneebar)			

=== Quintet Fight Night 5 ===
Quintet Fight Night 5
- Promotion: Quintet
- Date: October 27, 2020
- Venue: Korakuen Hall
- City: Tokyo, Japan

Quintet Fight Night 5 was a team grappling survival event held by Quintet on October 27, 2020, at the Korakuen Hall in Tokyo, Japan.

==== Teams ====
Team Carpe Diem

- (Japan) Masahiro Iwasaki
- (Japan) Tomoshige Sera
- (Japan) Masaki Takeura
- (Japan) Daisuke Shiraki
- (Japan) Tomoyuki Hashimoto

Team Tokoro Plus α 2nd

- (Japan) Naoyuki Kotani
- (Japan) Masakazu Imanari
- (Japan) Daisuke Nakamura
- (Japan) Hideo Tokoro
- (Japan) Masanori Kanehara

Team Wolf

- (United States) Grant Bogdanove
- (Japan) Masato Uchishiba
- (Japan) Seiichiro Ito
- (Japan) Michihiro Omigawa
- (Japan) Shinji Morito

Team OneHundred

- (Japan) Kohei Yasumi
- (Japan) Toshiyasu Sagae
- (Japan) Kenichi Ito
- (Japan) Shoki Higuchi
- (Japan) Caol Uno

==== Quintet Fight Night 5 Bracket ====
Semi Finals
(Japan) Team Carpe Diem
(Japan) Team Wolf
(Japan) Team Tokoro Plus α 2nd
(Japan) Team OneHundred

Finals
(Japan) Team Carpe Diem
(Japan) Team Tokoro Plus α 2nd

=== Quintet Fight Night 6 ===
Quintet Fight Night 6
- Promotion: Quintet
- Date: March 12, 2021
- Venue: Ex Theater Roppongi
- City: Tokyo, Japan

Quintet Fight Night 6 was a team grappling survival event held by Quintet on March 12, 2021, at the Ex Theater Roppongi in Tokyo, Japan.

==== Teams ====
Team Carpe Diem

- (Japan) Satomi Takano
- (Japan) Mitomo Moriwaki
- (Japan) Haruki Ishiguro
- (Japan) Satomi Suga
- (Japan) Yuki Uchiyama

Team Fairtex

- (Japan) Kazuko Sakamoto
- (Japan) Ryoko Yoshida
- (Japan) Carolina De Amorim Kuwahara
- (Brazil) Julyanna Laurentino
- (Japan) Kanon Kishida

Team Coroblock

- (Japan) Yuki Ono
- (Japan) Emi Fujino
- (Japan) Norika Ryu
- (Japan) Tomomi Sunaba
- (Japan) Takayo Hashi

==== Quintet Fight Night 6 Bracket ====
Round 1
(Japan) Team Carpe Diem
(Japan) Team Fairtex

Round 2
(Japan) Team Fairtex
(Japan) Team Coroblock

Finals
(Japan) Team Carpe Diem
(Japan) Team Fairtex

=== Quintet Fight Night 7 ===
Quintet Fight Night 7
- Promotion: Quintet
- Date: July 13, 2021
- Venue: Korakuen Hall
- City: Tokyo, Japan

Quintet Fight Night 7 was a lightweight team grappling survival event held by Quintet on July 13, 2021, at the Korakuen Hall in Tokyo, Japan.

==== Teams ====
Team Tri-Force

- (Japan) Naoki Hirata
- (Japan) Nobuhiro Sawada
- (Japan) Daizo Ishige
- (Japan) Kosuke Nakajima
- (Japan) Kazuhiro Suzuki

Team Brave Gym

- (Japan) Toshiyasu Sagae
- (Japan) Masakazu Imanari
- (Japan) Tatsuki Saomoto
- (Japan) Sotaro Yamada
- (Japan) Kazuyuki Miyata

Team Wolf

- (Japan) Masato Uchishiba
- (Japan) Seiichiro Ito
- (Japan) Shinji Morito
- (Japan) Michihiro Omigawa
- (United States) Grant Bogdanove

Team The Body Ride

- (Japan) Kohei Yasumi
- (Japan) Tomoshige Sera
- (Japan) Daisuke Nakamura
- (Japan) Shutaro Debana
- (Japan) Naoyuki Kotani

==== Quintet Fight Night 7 Bracket ====
Semi Finals
(Japan) Team Tri-Force
(Japan) Team Wolf
(Japan) Team Brave Gym
(Japan) Team The Body Ride

Finals
(Japan) Team Wolf
(Japan) Team The Body Ride

=== Quintet 4 ===
QUINTET.4 ReBOOT
- Promotion: Quintet
- Date: September 10, 2023
- Venue: Yokohama Arena
- City: Tokyo, Japan

QUINTET.4 ReBOOT (also known as ReBOOT ~ QUINTET.4 or Quintet 4) is a team grappling survival event held by Quintet on September 10, 2023, at the Yokohama Arena in Tokyo, Japan. It is part of a larger collaborative event with K-1, known as "ReBOOT", and will be the first Quintet event after a two-year hiatus.

The original four teams competing would represent Polaris, 10th Planet Jiu Jitsu, New Wave Jiu Jitsu, and Kazushi Sakuraba. However, Team New Wave Jiu Jitsu withdrew from the event on July 28, 2023. They were replaced by B-Team Jiu-Jitsu the following day.

Quintet 4 was streamed on FloGrappling as part of a new streaming deal, making it the first event to not be streamed on UFC Fight Pass. The event will also stream globally on DAZN. The B-Team Bulls won the event. Craig Jones was awarded 'Submission of the Year' at the JitsMagazine BJJ Awards 2023 for the Toehold he submitted Richie Martinez with in the final match.

==== Teams ====
Team Sakuraba

- (Japan) Kazushi Sakuraba
- (Japan) Tomoshige Sera
- (Japan) Daisuke Nakamura
- (Cameroon) Haisam Rida
- (Australia) Harry Grech

Team 10th Planet

- (United States) Geo Martinez
- (United States) Richie Martinez
- (United States) PJ Barch
- (United States) Kyle Boehm
- (United States) Amir Allam

Team Polaris

- (Norway) Tarik Hopstock
- (England) Owen Livesey
- (Finland) Santeri Lilius
- (Brazil) Gregor Gracie
- (England) Jed Hue

The B-Team Bulls

- (Australia) Craig Jones
- (United States) Nick Rodriguez
- (United States) Nicky Ryan
- (United States) Jacob Rodriguez
- (Taiwan) Jozef Chen

==== Quintet 4 Bracket ====
Semi Finals
(United States) Team 10th Planet	1
(Japan) Team Sakuraba	0
(United Kingdom) Team Polaris
(United States) The B-Team Bulls	DEC

Finals
(United States) Team 10th Planet	0
(United States) The B-Team Bulls	2

=== Quintet 5 ===
QUINTET.5
- Promotion: Quintet
- Date: October 23, 2025
- Venue: Coca-Cola Arena
- City: Dubai, United Arab Emirates

QUINTET.5 (also known as Quintet 5) was a team grappling survival event held by Quintet on October 23, 2025, at the Coca-Cola Arena in Dubai, United Arab Emirates. It was the promotion's first event in the Middle East and its first since Quintet 4 in 2023, and was staged with regional promoter Tarek Suleiman.

Unlike previous editions, the four teams were fronted by captains drawn from PRIDE-era mixed martial arts: Kazushi Sakuraba, Renzo Gracie, Antônio Rodrigo Nogueira and Bob Sapp, who coached rather than competed. Twenty-six athletes appeared on the card in total, with three individual super-fights supporting the four-team tournament. Each team was required to weigh in under a combined limit of 430 kg. Heel hooks were made legal for the first time.

The event was streamed on TrillerTV. Team Nogueira Dubai won the tournament, defeating Team Saku Japan 2–1 in the final after Pouya Rahmani submitted Daisuke Nakamura with a kimura in the closing seconds.

==== Teams ====
Team Saku Japan (Coach: Kazushi Sakuraba)

- (Japan) Sousuke Oshima
- (Japan) Taisei Sakuraba
- (Cameroon) Haisam Rida
- (Japan) Daisuke Nakamura
- (Japan) Igor Tanabe

Team Nogueira Dubai (Coach: (Brazil) Antônio Rodrigo Nogueira)

- (Russia) Zelimkhan Kasaev
- (Russia) Nikolay Vetrov
- (Egypt) Abdelraaouf "Mido" Mohamed
- (Brazil) Thiago Sá
- (Iran) Pouya Rahmani

Team Renzo Gracie MMA (Coach: (Brazil) Renzo Gracie)

- (Brazil) Talison Soares
- (Brazil) Anderson Wesiley
- (Brazil) Neiman Gracie
- (Brazil) Andre Cantanhede
- (Brazil) Delson Heleno

Team Bangtao Thailand (Coach: (United States) Bob Sapp)

- (United States) Kemoy Anderson
- (United States) PJ Barch
- (South Korea) Dong Hyun Kim
- (United States) Alex Schild
- (Brazil) Lucas Barbosa

==== Quintet 5 Bracket ====
Semi Finals
Team Saku Japan	2
Team Renzo Gracie MMA	1
Team Nogueira Dubai	Dec.
Team Bangtao Thailand

Final
Team Saku Japan	1
Team Nogueira Dubai	2

=== Quintet 6 ===
A FESTIVAL OF PEACE QUINTET.6
- Promotion: Quintet
- Date: July 25, 2026
- Venue: Kyu Butokuden
- City: Kyoto, Japan

QUINTET.6 (also known as Quintet 6 or A FESTIVAL OF PEACE QUINTET.6) was a team grappling survival event held by Quintet on July 25, 2026, at the Kyu Butokuden in Kyoto, Japan. It was the first professional combat sports event staged at the venue, a designated Important Cultural Property.

Unlike Quintet 5, the card was contested by four Japanese and South Korean teams without celebrity captains, each led by an athlete competing on the night. The tournament was fought under a combined team weight limit of 400 kg, and Quintet announced that men's competition would henceforth be divided into three categories: Heavy Weight (430 kg), Middle Weight (400 kg) and Light Weight (360 kg).

Team K-TOP BJJ was renamed TEAM INSPIRE on July 2, 2026 following a sponsorship agreement, and Craig Hutchison withdrew from TEAM NINJA through injury, with Eiki Suzuki announced as his replacement on July 16.

The event was streamed domestically on Lemino. TEAM Iwamoto Adventures won the tournament on their debut, defeating TEAM NINJA in the final. Hidehiko Yoshida performed a judo demonstration at the venue.

==== Teams ====
TEAM NINJA (397.4 kg)

- (Japan) Igor Tanabe (leader)
- (Japan) Eiki Suzuki
- (Japan) Roberto Oda
- (Japan) Takeji Yokoyama
- (Japan) Sosuke Oshima

TEAM Bogdanove United

- (United States) Grant Bogdanove (leader)
- (Japan) Shinji Morito
- (Brazil) Xavier Silva
- (Japan) Takuma Sudo
- (Japan) Ibuki Arimatsu

TEAM Iwamoto Adventures

- (Japan) Kenta Iwamoto (leader)
- (Japan) Shoya Ishiguro
- (Japan) Hiroto Ninomiya
- (Japan) Masaki Takeura
- (Japan) Daiki Yonekura

TEAM INSPIRE (396 kg)

- (South Korea) Noh Young-am (leader)
- (South Korea) Cho Yeong-seong
- (South Korea) Kim Hee-seung
- (South Korea) Kim Jong-yong
- (South Korea) Chae Wan-ki

==== Quintet 6 Bracket ====
Semi Finals
TEAM INSPIRE	0
TEAM NINJA	1
TEAM Iwamoto Adventures	2
TEAM Bogdanove United	1

Final
TEAM NINJA	0
TEAM Iwamoto Adventures	2
