= Naoki Sano =

Japanese professional wrestler (born 1965)

Personal information
- Born: February 2, 1965 (age 61) Tomakomai, Hokkaido, Japan

Professional wrestling career
- Ring name(s): Takuma Sano; Yuhi Sano; Naoki Sano; Mr. Sato
- Billed height: 1.80 m (5 ft 11 in)
- Billed weight: 110 kg (243 lb)
- Trained by: NJPW Dojo
- Debut: March 3, 1984
- Retired: January 7, 2020
- Mixed martial arts career Martial arts career
- Nationality: Japanese
- Height: 1.8 m (5 ft 11 in)
- Weight: 110 kg (243 lb; 17 st 5 lb)
- Style: MMA; Shooto
- Team: NJPW Dojo

Naoki Sano (佐野 直喜, Sano Naoki) (born February 2, 1965) is a Japanese retired professional wrestler and former mixed martial artist most notable for being the generational rival of legendary Japanese pro wrestler Jushin Liger. During the last years of his career he went by the name Takuma Sano (佐野巧真, Sano Takuma).

== Professional wrestling career ==
=== New Japan Pro-Wrestling (1984–1990, 2020) ===
Sano was a member of the 1984 NJPW Dojo class, and in his first few years wrestled in preliminary matches. In 1987, he went on an overseas excursion to Mexico, wrestling for the Universal Wrestling Association (UWA). In August 1987, he won his first championship, the Distrito Federal Trios Championship with fellow NJPW wrestlers Hirokazu Hata and Yoshihiro Asai. Upon his return to the promotion in January 1989, he won the Young Tokyo Dome Cup on April 24, becoming the first NJPW wrestler to wrestle inside the Tokyo Dome, along with Hiro Saito. He went on to have numerous acclaimed matches against Jyushin Liger. Sano defeated Liger for the IWGP Junior Heavyweight Championship on August 10, 1989, but lost it to Liger on January 31, 1990. In April 1990, he went on an overseas excursion to Canada, wrestling under the name Mr. Sato for the Canadian National Wrestling Alliance promotion in Calgary, where he won the promotion's World Mid-Heavyweight Championship.

After several returns representing other promotions, Sano returned to NJPW for the last time in January 2020, at their Wrestle Kingdom 14 events. On January 5, he and Jushin Liger were defeated by Hiromu Takahashi and Ryu Lee, after which Liger retired. Two days later on January 7, Sano retired.

=== Super World of Sports and Pro Wrestling Fujiwara Gumi (1990–1992) ===
During his Canadian excursion in July 1990, Sano moved to the Super World of Sports (SWS) after a big money offer from Megane Super, the company backing the promotion. In SWS he became the top junior heavyweight, feuding with native talent and outsider talent from the United States, Mexico, and outsider promotions Universal Lucha Libre and Pro Wrestling Fujiwara Gumi. In December 1991, Sano won the tournament for the SWS Light Heavyweight Championship. He was the only titleholder.

After SWS collapsed in June 1992, Sano worked a few matches for Pro Wrestling Fujiwara Gumi, but soon moved to Union of Wrestling Force International (UWFI) upon recommendation from former NJPW comrades Nobuhiko Takada and Kazuo Yamazaki, the top stars of UWFI.

=== UWF International (1992–1996) ===
In UWFI, he adopted the name Yuhi Sano. Adopting the shinguards and trunks typical of shoot style wrestlers, Sano had more opportunities to face actual heavyweights. Nevertheless, during the 1995-96 feud against NJPW, Sano participated on UWFI's side, beating old rival Liger one more time but losing to Shinya Hashimoto. In the feud against the WAR promotion, which had been born out of the ashes of SWS, Sano lost to old patron Genichiro Tenryu in a singles match. Upon UWFI's collapse later in December 1996, Sano joined its successor promotion, Kingdom.

=== Independent circuit (1997–2001) ===
He returned to wrestling, entering Battlarts and feuding with Minoru Tanaka over the Independent World Junior Heavyweight Championship. Sano won the belt from Tanaka in May 1999 and dropped it to him the following year. In 2000 he participated in the third Super J-Cup tournament held by Michinoku Pro Wrestling. He advanced to the final four before losing to eventual runner-up Cima.

=== Pro Wrestling Noah (2001–2012) ===
In 2001, he joined Pro Wrestling Noah. He became Takuma Sano, for a year wearing tights and wrestling junior heavyweights, but after fully turning heavyweight, he returned to the shinguards and trunks. As part of the faction led by Akira Taue and also composed of Daisuke Ikeda, Sano had opportunities for the GHC Heavyweight Championship held by Kenta Kobashi and later, Mitsuharu Misawa, but failed both times. In 2010, he teamed with Yoshihiro Takayama to win the Global Tag League. On September 18, 2010, Sano and Takayama defeated Akitoshi Saito and Bison Smith to win the vacant GHC Tag Team Championship. They would lose the title to New Japan Pro-Wrestling's Giant Bernard and Karl Anderson on June 18, 2011, at Dominion 6.18 in a match contested also for the IWGP Tag Team Championship. After his contract with NOAH expired in January 2012, Sano became a freelancer.

== Mixed martial arts career ==
As a former UWF-i member, Sano was also a mixed martial artist and participated in the Pride Fighting Championships, which were originally created to pit Sano's trainer Nobuhiko Takada and Rickson Gracie. Sano debuted at Pride 2, where he faced Rickson's brother Royler. The Brazilian opened the fight by taking Yuhi down and mounting him, only to Sano to sweep him aside and block a triangle choke attempt before returning to standing position. Sano blocked a takedown, but was swept by Royler and the jiu-jitsu expert gained top position, though he was unable to finish him due to Yuhi's defensive skills. After Yuhi swept him again, Royler tried another triangle choke and managed to draw blood from Sano with upkicks and strikes from the guard. The end of the fight came when Royler finally took his back and performed an armbar to make Sano submit.

In October of that year at Pride 4, Sano faced a striker instead of a grappler, in the shape of Shooto's karate stylist Satoshi Honma. Sano resisted his punches and clinched knees and took Honma down, but the karateka kept hitting from the guard and nullified his offensive. Back to standing, Honma struck Sano with more punches and knees, cutting Yuhi's eyes and delivering a hard punishment before the referee called the knockout in Honma's favour. Sano had his last fight for Pride at Pride 9, being submitted by Carlos Newton in a short bout. In addition to his active career, Sano helped train fighters at the Takada Dojo.

== Mixed martial arts record ==
Professional record breakdown
4 matches	0 wins	4 losses
By knockout	0	2
By submission	0	2
By decision	0	0
By disqualification	0	0
Draws	0	
No contests	0	

Res.	Record	Opponent	Method	Event	Date	Round	Time	Location	Notes
Loss	0–4	Carlos Newton	Submission (armbar)	Pride 9	June 4, 2000	1	0:40	Nagoya, Japan	
Loss	0–3	Keiichiro Yamamiya	TKO (strikes)	Pancrase - Breakthrough 3	March 9, 1999	1	10:43	Tokyo, Japan	
Loss	0–2	Satoshi Honma	TKO (punches)	Pride 4	October 11, 1998	1	9:25	Tokyo, Japan	
Loss	0–1	Royler Gracie	Submission (armbar)	PRIDE 2	March 15, 1998	1	33:14	Yokohama, Kanagawa, Japan	

== Championships and accomplishments ==
- Canadian National Wrestling Alliance
  - CNWA World Mid-Heavyweight Championship (1 time)
- Comision de Box y Lucha D.F.
  - Distrito Federal Trios Championship (1 time) - with Yoshihiro Asai and Hata Hirokazu
- Frontier Martial-Arts Wrestling
  - FMW World Junior Heavyweight Championship (1 time)
- Kingdom
  - Kingdom One Million Yen Tournament Winner - August 1997
- New Japan Pro-Wrestling
  - IWGP Junior Heavyweight Championship (1 time)
  - Young Lion Tournament (1989)
- Pro Wrestling Noah
  - GHC Tag Team Championship (1 time) – with Yoshihiro Takayama
  - Global Tag League (2010) - with Yoshihiro Takayama
  - Global League Technique Award (2010)
- Super World of Sports
  - SWS Light Heavyweight Championship (1 time)
- Wrestle Association R
  - WAR World Six-Man Tag Team Championship (1 time) – with Nobuhiko Takada and Masahito Kakihara
  - WAR World Six-Man Tag Team Championship Tournament (1996) – with Nobuhiko Takada and Masahito Kakihara
- Wrestling Observer Newsletter
  - Match of the Year (1990) vs. Jyushin Thunder Liger on January 31 in Osaka, Japan
