= Takada Dojo =

Mixed martial arts academy in Tokyo, Japan

- Founded by: Nobuhiko Takada
- Past titleholders: Kazushi Sakuraba UFC Ultimate Japan Heavyweight Tournament (UFC 1997) 265lbs. Ricco Rodriguez KOTC Openweight Champion (KOTC 2001); Takenori Sato Deep Future King Tournament (Deep 2004) 82kg Yujiro Kushida ZST Genesis Lightweight Tournament (ZST 2004); Ryuichi Murata Spirit MC Heavyweight Grand Prix Tournament (Spirit MC 2007); Kensaku Nakamura Pancrase- Gate 4th Chance Featherweight Tournament (Pancrase 2010)
- Prominent fighters: Kazushi Sakuraba "The Gracie Hunter" (frmr. member); Ricco Rodriguez (frmr. member)
- Training facilities: Japan
- Website: Takada Dojo

The Takada Dojo is a mixed martial arts academy in Tokyo, Japan. The dojo takes its name from Nobuhiko Takada its founder. Many members, including Takada, have participated in both professional wrestling and mixed martial arts. The dojo and its founder were heavily involved in the formative events of the Pride Fighting Championships.

== History ==
Takada would fully sponsor incoming hopefuls, giving them the opportunity to train every day in preparation for their first professional fight. Takada implemented a standard test for all of the incoming fighters at his dojo. Those who wished to become uchi-deshi or full-time students at his school, were required to undergo a sort of initiation ritual where a tireless routine of exercise stations and sparring partners were set up to test the will-power and heart of the new fighters.

== Takada Dojo fighters ==
=== Current roster ===
- Kensaku Nakamura
- Masakazu Takafuji
- Nobuhiko Takada
- Ryuichi Murata
- Wataru Takahashi
- Yusuke Imamura

=== Former members ===
- Daijiro Matsui
- Kazuhiro Hamanaka
- Kazushi Sakuraba
- Kazuyuki Fujita
- Masaaki Satake
- Minoru Toyonaga
- Motomare Takahashi
- Paweł Nastula
- Ricco Rodriguez
- Shungo Oyama
- Takenori Sato
- Yoon Dong-Sik
- Yoshihisa Yamamoto
- Yōsuke Nishijima
- Yuhi Sano
- Yujiro Kushida

== See also ==
- List of Top Professional MMA Training Camps
