= HDNet Fights =

MMA media outlets based in Las Vegas

- Type: Private
- Industry: Mixed martial arts
- Founded: 2007
- Founder: Mark Cuban
- Headquarters: Las Vegas, Nevada, United States
- Key people: Mark Cuban, Owner; Andrew Simon, CEO; Guy Mezger, President
- Parent: HDNet, LLC
- Website: http://www.hdnetfights.com/

HDNet Fights was a US based television outlet for various MMA and combat sports promotions. Its broadcast lineup included DREAM, Sengoku, K-1, Strikeforce, Adrenaline MMA, M-1 Global, Ring of Honor, Maximum Fighting Championship, Affliction Entertainment, Urban Conflict Championship, BAMMA, XFC, Superior Challenge, CFA, Titan Fighting Championships and the now defunct IFL among others. As of February 19, 2010, it has promoted two events of its own and broadcast 60 events by other promotions. After July 2, 2012, when HDNet re-branded itself as AXS TV, HDNet Fights was re-branded as AXS TV Fights.

== History ==
HDNet Fights was founded in 2007 by HDNet owner and founder, billionaire entrepreneur Mark Cuban, as a staple of programming upon which to base the new network. Cuban has since expressed a desire to present MMA in a manner more in line with other professional sports, saying that he would eliminate ancillary details such as ring card girls. Despite speculation of how personally Cuban himself would be involved in the business and promoting of MMA, he has proven to be a vocal defender of MMA in his blogs and interviews since starting the promotion.

HDNet Fights briefly promoted its own fights. The first was hosted on October 13, 2007, with the main event being a light-heavyweight contest between Erik Paulson and Jeff Ford. Its second event, Reckless Abandon, was held two months later.

=== Inside MMA ===
In company with the announcement of the new promotion, HDNet also began broadcasting its MMA-focused sports program called Inside MMA. Its first broadcast aired on September 14, 2007, and guests were former UFC light heavyweight champion Chuck Liddell and well known MMA fan and actor Kevin James. The show is hosted by Kenny Rice and Bas Rutten. Broadcasts and segments from the show can also be found on HDNet's YouTube subscription, Sherdog.com, and the HDNet Fights website.

=== Partnership with Dream and World Victory Road ===
HDNet acquired the rights to air Japanese Fighting and Entertainment Group's MMA promotion Dream and aired it for the first time in the United States with a repeat of Dream 1 on May 2, 2008. A repeat of Dream 2 was aired the following day, while Dream 3 was aired live on May 11. HDNet is scheduled to air all future Dream events.

On February 6, 2009, HDNet also announced they had reached and agreement with another Japanese MMA promotion and competitor to Dream, World Victory Road, to broadcast its "Sengoku"-events in the United States starting with WVR's first event of 2009 on March 20.
