= Inside MMA =

US television program

- Title graphic
- Genre: Mixed martial arts news
- Starring: Bas Rutten, Mauro Ranallo, Ron Kruck and Kenny Rice, Produced by Reginald Rice, or Kenny Rice's Father
- Country of origin: United States
- Original language: English
- No. of seasons: 10

Production
- Running time: approx. 60 min.

Original release
- Network: AXS TV
- Release: September 14, 2007 – September 30, 2016

Inside MMA was a live mixed martial arts news magazine, which aired on AXS TV, immediately following the network's live AXS TV Fights broadcasts. Hosted by Mauro Ranallo and UFC Hall of Famer Bas Rutten, the series provided an in-depth look at the world of MMA, with live breakdowns, talk, highlights, and analysis from major MMA organizations such as the UFC, Bellator, and the World Series of Fighting. Inside MMA debuted on AXS TV, then known as HDNET, in September 2007, and was the longest-running MMA news show on television.

== Hosts ==
Inside MMA was hosted by combat sports personality Mauro Ranallo and UFC Hall of Famer, former UFC heavyweight champion, and King of Pancrase Bas Rutten, along with correspondent Ron Kruck. Kruck also filled in as co-host on occasion.

For the first nine seasons, sports commentator Kenny Rice hosted the series alongside Rutten.

== Content ==
Inside MMA aired immediately following AXS TV Fights broadcasts. Each show began with highlights and analysis of the night's event with AXS TV Fights commentators UFC Hall of Famer Pat Miletich and "The Voice" Michael Schiavello. Hosts Ranallo and Rutten also provided highlights from MMA and other combat sport events from around the world, featuring promotions such as UFC, Bellator, World Series of Fighting, and One FC, as well as many other regional MMA promotions. Each episode also included a viewer submission segment, featuring highlights submitted by Inside MMA viewers.

Correspondent Ron Kruck provided on-site coverage of major MMA events, feature stories on issues facing the sport, and interview segments with fighters, coaches, trainers, and others who contribute to and influence Mixed Martial Arts.

== Guests ==
Inside MMA frequently featured in-studio, on-site, phone and satellite interviews with guests from all facets of the sport, including fighters, promoters, managers, officials and journalists. Notable guests included Dana White, Ronda Rousey, Daniel Cormier, Nick Diaz, Conor McGregor, Gilbert Melendez, Tito Ortiz, Georges St-Pierre, José Aldo, TJ Dillashaw, Dominick Cruz, Jon Jones, and Mickey Rourke.

== Guest hosts ==
Occasionally, MMA fighters filled in as special guest hosts on Inside MMA. Past guest hosts include Johny Hendricks, Roy Nelson, Phil Davis, Miesha Tate, and Urijah Faber.

== History ==
On August 15, 2014, UFC fighter Krzysztof Soszynski officially announced his retirement from the sport, citing memory loss, in a live on-air exclusive, while appearing as a guest on an episode of Inside MMA.

In late 2014, AXS TV announced that the show would move time slots to after the network's weekly live AXS TV Fights broadcasts. The move would take place starting Friday, Nov. 7, 2014.

In May 2015, UFC President Dana White appeared on the show to announce that Rutten would be inducted into the UFC Hall of Fame in July.

Inside MMA aired a special episode dedicated to UFC Women's Bantamweight Champion and Legacy Fighting Championship's first ever women's titlist Holly Holm on Nov. 20, 2015 following her defeat of former undefeated champion Ronda Rousey. The special included interviews with Holm, her coaches and teammates, along with analysis of her fight plan and highlights from her matches on AXS TV Fights.

On March 9, 2016, Inside MMA announced that combat sports personality Mauro Ranallo would be the new series host alongside Bas Rutten beginning March 25, 2016, taking over for longtime host Kenny Rice. Rice would continue as a special correspondent for the show. When Mauro Ranallo was absent due to his announcing duties for WWE, he was replaced by Josh Barnett on June 17, 2016, until June 24, 2016. Barnett hosted the show on August 19, 2016, replacing the absence of Bas Rutten.

On Sept. 19, 2016, AXS TV announced that 'Inside MMA' would air its final episode on Sept. 30, 2016, ending a 9-year, 10-season, 433-episode run.

== See also ==
- AXS TV Fights
- MMA Live
- Bloody Elbow
