= Jeff Ford =

Jeff Ford may refer to:

- Jeff Ford (kickboxer), see AXS TV Fights
- Jeffrey Ford (born 1955), American writer
- Jeffrey Ford (film editor), American film editor
