= AXS TV =

American specialty television channel

- Country: United States
- Broadcast area: Nationwide; Canada
- Headquarters: Denver, Colorado (Note: With additional offices in Dallas and Los Angeles)

Programming
- Language: English
- Picture format: 1080i (HDTV); 480i (SDTV)

Ownership
- Owner: AXS TV, LLC: (Anthem Sports & Entertainment [majority owner]; 2929 Entertainment; AEG)
- Sister channels: HDNet Movies; GameTV (Canada); Game+ (Canada); Fight Network (Canada)

History
- Launched: September 6, 2001; 25 years ago
- Founder: Mark Cuban
- Former names: HDNet (2001–2012)

Links
- Website: axs.tv

Availability

Streaming media
- Service(s): DirecTV Stream, Philo, Sling TV, FuboTV,

AXS TV (pronounced "access"; AK-sess) is an American cable television channel majority-owned by Canadian broadcaster Anthem Sports & Entertainment. It is devoted primarily to music-related programming (such as concert films, documentaries, and reality series involving musicians) and combat sports–related programming (including boxing, mixed martial arts and professional wrestling).

The network was originally established in 2001 as HDNet, with investor Mark Cuban as a founding partner. HDNet was originally intended as an exclusively-high-definition network, carrying films and acquired television series, concerts, news programming, and sporting events produced in the format. HDNet's original niche became increasingly redundant as more cable networks established their own HD feeds.

In 2012, HDNet sold ownership stakes to Anschutz Entertainment Group (AEG), Creative Artists Agency, and Ryan Seacrest, with Cuban retaining a majority stake. The network was then relaunched under its current name—taken from AEG's online ticket platform AXS.com—on July 2, 2012, pivoting to a format based on music and popular culture. In September 2019, Anthem Sports & Entertainment acquired a majority stake in AXS TV, with AEG and Cuban retaining minority stakes.

As of November 2023, AXS TV is available to approximately 32,000,000 pay television households in the United States.

== History ==
=== As HDNet ===
Logo as HDNet

The network originally launched as HDNet on September 6, 2001, designed as a high definition-exclusive service under the ownership of HDNet, LLC, which then was co-owned by Mark Cuban, owner of the Dallas Mavericks, and Philip Garvin, owner of Colorado Studios and Mobile TV Group. Originally, the network aired a variety of programming, much of it male-oriented, prominently featuring series, sports events, and concert performances. In December 2001 and January 2002, HDNet aired exclusive HD coverage of the U.S. invasion of Afghanistan with former CNN correspondent Peter Arnett.

In February 2002, the network originated eight daily hours of high definition content from the 2002 Winter Olympics in Salt Lake City; this feed was picked up by NBC and aired in 24-hour rotation on the digital signals of NBC's stations. Later on that year, it signed a deal with Paramount Domestic Television to provide high-definition versions of the Paramount library.

The channel gradually expanded its carriage to the satellite providers DirecTV and Dish Network, as well as the cable providers Charter Communications, Insight Communications, Mediacom, Suddenlink Communications, Verizon FiOS, and AT&T U-verse. On September 4, 2008, Cuban announced that the network had reached an agreement with Comcast to carry both HDNet and HDNet Movies in various markets. The provider began to carry HDNet in many major markets on September 30, 2010. In November 2009, DirecTV became the first provider to offer video-on-demand services of HDNet and HDNet Movies.

=== As AXS TV ===
On January 18, 2012, HDNet, LLC entered into a joint venture with entertainment company/promoter Anschutz Entertainment Group, media personality Ryan Seacrest, and talent agency Creative Artists Agency, in which AEG, CAA, and Ryan Seacrest Media would each purchase a share of the network, with Cuban retaining primary ownership. The network rebranded on July 2, 2012, as AXS TV, a name taken from AEG's ticket sales website AXS.com. With the purchase and rebranding, the channel gradually shifted focus to include a mix of entertainment news, lifestyle, pop culture and in-concert performance events.

Alongside the rebranding, Dish Network announced that it would expand the channel's distribution to customers who do not subscribe to an HD tier through a downconverted standard definition feed. The provider moved the network to channel 131 in the spring of 2012, increasing its carriage to at least 14 million Dish Network subscribers upon its relaunch as AXS TV. Through its relationship with AEG, AXS TV also planned to offer special promotions on concerts to Dish Network users who have subscribed to the channel. On February 14, 2013, CBS Corporation took a minority stake in the channel, in exchange for providing content and marketing (suggesting that the channel could air complementary programming for CBS-aired entertainment events such as the Grammy Awards).

In addition to carriage on cable, satellite and telecommunication providers, AXS TV has been added to streaming media providers including Sling TV in October 2016, DirecTV Now when it debuted in November 2016, and Philo when it was launched in November 2017.

==== Sale to Anthem ====
On September 9, 2019, Canadian company Anthem Sports & Entertainment announced that it had acquired a majority stake in AXS TV and HDNet Movies. Mark Cuban and AEG will retain interests in the company as minority equity partners, while AEG will also continue to provide additional sales support for the network through its AEG Global Partnerships unit. Television personality Steve Harvey was also brought in as an additional financier and content partner.

Anthem's founder and owner Leonard Asper stated that there were no plans to make any major changes to AXS TV's format or programming, or to add programming from other Anthem channels unless they were complementary to the AXS TV's existing format. Shortly after the purchase, it was announced that Impact!—the weekly flagship program of Anthem-owned Impact Wrestling (both formerly and now known as TNA)—would move from minority-owned sister network Pursuit Channel to AXS TV.

The sale resulted in the layoff of 40 employees, consisting mainly of redundancies with Anthem staff.

== Programming ==
AXS TV primarily airs music-oriented series, with a particular focus on the Rock and Pop genres. Such programming includes documentaries, interviews, panel shows and concerts. AXS has also aired combat sports-related programming, including events broadcast under the AXS TV Fights banner, as well as content from the Anthem-owned Total Nonstop Action Wrestling (TNA) and Invicta Fighting Championships.

=== Programming history ===
==== As HDNet ====
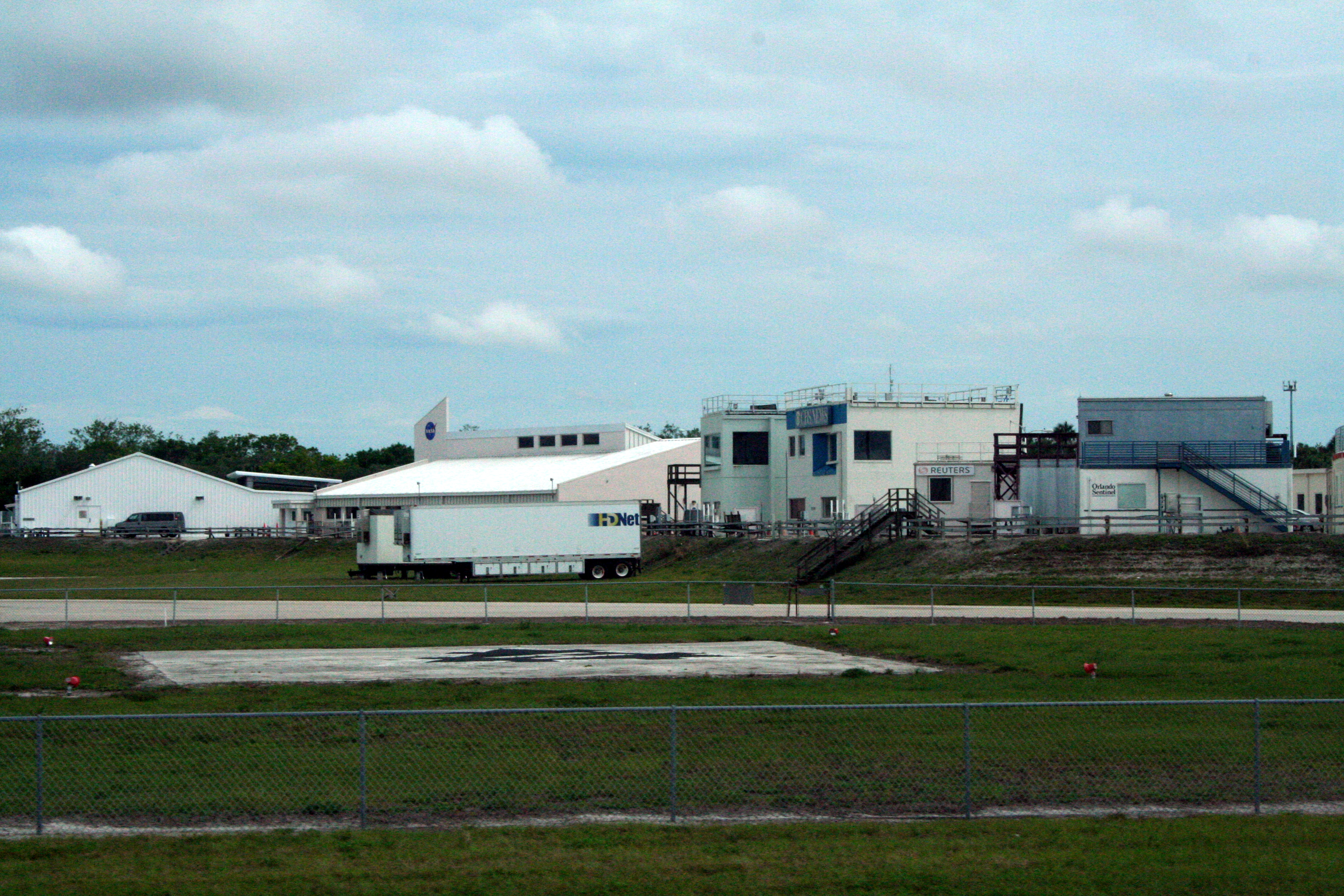
An HDNet production trailer is stored between launches at the Kennedy Space Center press area. NASA Space Shuttle launches aired on HDNet.

Original programming on HDNet included news programs such as the HDNet World Report and Dan Rather Reports, a weekly newsmagazine hosted by former CBS Evening News anchor Dan Rather; coverage of Space Shuttle launches; and male-oriented series such as Ultimate Trailer Show. HDNet also featured uncensored and unrated shows during late-night hours, such as Art Mann Presents, Bikini Destinations and Girls Gone Wild Presents: Search for the Hottest Girl in America. In October 2011, HDNet picked up Goodnight Burbank, the network's first scripted half-hour comedy. Originally created for the web, the show starred Hayden Black, Laura Silverman and Dominic Monaghan. HDNet's programming also included off-network reruns of series such as Smallville, Andy Richter Controls the Universe, JAG, Star Trek: Enterprise and Arrested Development.

HDNet also aired sporting events, including coverage of the National Hockey League from 2001 to 2008 and Major League Soccer; select motorsports events, including Champ Car live broadcasts in 2004, highlights and races from the NASCAR Busch East Series (later Camping World East Series, K&N Pro Series East, and ARCA Menards Series East), and races from regional circuits; mixed martial arts, through Cuban's HDNet Fights promotion; the weekly series Inside MMA, which featured highlights and coverage from various MMA promotions; and Indiana University's Little 500 Bicycle Race. From 2009 to 2011, HDNet also aired weekly programming from professional wrestling promotion Ring of Honor, and served as a television partner of the United Football League, primarily airing the league's Saturday night games. The network dropped UFL coverage prior to the 2011 season. Following its July 2012 re-launch, AXS TV continued to air several programs carried over from HDNet, including Dan Rather Reports, MMA events (under the AXS TV Fights banner), movies, and off-network series. However, the channel began to gradually shift its focus towards "music, pop culture and lifestyle-oriented" programming, such as concerts, and general entertainment.

==== Concerts and music festivals ====
AXS TV concerts

As part of its music programming lineup, AXS TV broadcasts a wide variety of concert events from across the country and around-the-world. This includes a Sunday night concert series featuring performances from artists such as Carrie Underwood, Led Zeppelin, Neil Young and Elton John; themed artists takeovers, highlighting a variety of bands in day-long blocks that feature music videos, concert performances, interviews and more, with notable takeovers from Slash and Matchbox Twenty; as well as other live and taped music events such as the Classic Rock Roll of Honour Awards tribute to Gregg Allman and The Doors, hosted by Sammy Hagar and the live broadcast of the 2014 Farm Aid music festival that featured performances by Willie Nelson, John Mellencamp, and Dave Matthews.

In 2014, AXS TV broadcast the inaugural Alternative Press Music Awards, hosted by Mark Hoppus. The award show returned to AXS TV on July 22, 2015, hosted by Alex Gaskarth and Jack Barakat of All Time Low and featuring performances from Weezer, Panic! at the Disco, and Simple Plan among others.

Concert specials in 2017 included Queen, Willie Nelson and Merle Haggard, Def Leppard, Jennifer Nettles, Mavis Staples, Robert Plant, Kenny Loggins, and Ringo Starr.

AXS TV celebrated the 50th anniversary of the Summer of Love with a month-long event in August 2017 with concerts honoring the music of The Grateful Dead and Jerry Garcia and documentaries profiling artists of the time period such as Jimi Hendrix, Janis Joplin and The Doors. The network also premiered a new documentary about the social phenomenon, eponymously titled Summer of Love, on August 12, 2017.

Concert specials premiered in 2018 included: Sammy Hagar, Poison, Santana, Farm Aid, Charlie Daniels, Trace Adkins' Guitar Legends for Heroes, The 2018 BRIT Awards and more.

AXS TV announced the premiere of America Salutes You: Guitar Legends II on Sunday, March 31, starring Sammy Hagar, Billy Gibbons, Dave Navarro, Robby Krieger, Stephen Stills, Joe Bonamassa, Orianthi and more. This year marks the second year in a row AXS TV has served as production partner and cable provided for the acclaimed concert. The "Guitar Legends II" concert seeks to raise funds and awareness for charity organizations supporting brain and mental wellness of American veterans and first responders.

AXS TV teamed up with Feld Entertainment to produce Ringling Bros and Barnum & Bailey: The Final Farewell, a behind-the-scenes look at the final performance of the longest-running touring show in America. The 90-minute documentary premieres on Memorial Day, May 27, 2019.

Music festivals

In 2013, for the first time ever on television, AXS TV broadcast select concert footage from the Stagecoach Festival and the New Orleans Jazz and Heritage Festival.

In 2014, AXS TV presented the television debut of the Coachella Valley Music and Arts Festival, in addition to broadcasting the 2014 Stagecoach Country Music Festival, and the 2014 New Orleans Jazz and Heritage Festival for the second consecutive year.

The network's 2015 festival slate included the Coachella Valley Music and Arts Festival (April 17-April 19) for the second consecutive year; the Stagecoach Country Music Festival (April 24-April 26); and New Orleans Jazz & Heritage Festival (May 1-May 3) for the third consecutive year. Additionally, the network broadcast footage from the 2015 Rock on the Range (May 15-May 17) and the 2015 Firefly Music Festival (June 19-June 21), for the first time ever.

AXS TV's 2016 festival tour included Zac Brown Band's Southern Ground Music & Food Festival (April 16–17), both weekends of the New Orleans Jazz & Heritage Festival (April 23–24, April 29-May 1), Monster Energy Carolina Rebellion (May 6–8) and Hangout Festival May 20–22.

AXS TV announced a new four-part festival series 80s in the Sand, which premiered on April 7, 2019. Hosted by 1980s TV and Radio personalities Downtown Julie Brown, Mark Goodman, Alan Hunter and Richard Blade, 80s in the Sand features interviews and performances with artists including Bret Michaels, Sebastian Bach, Taylor Dayne, The English Beat, Wang Chung, ABC, When in Rome, Berlin and more. The series was filmed at the 80s in the Sand music festival at the Breathless Resort in Punta Cana, Dominican Republic.

==== Original series ====
===== The Big Interview with Dan Rather =====
Since 2013, Dan Rather has hosted the hour-long original series titled The Big Interview featuring in-depth interviews with a variety of celebrity guests as they join Rather for candid discussions about their lives and careers. Notable guests include Gene Simmons, Weird Al Yankovic, Don Rickles, Wynonna Judd, Jack White, Carlos Santana, Carol Burnett, Alan Alda, and Geddy Lee among others. The Big Interview's sixth season premiered on March 13, 2018, with guest Robert Plant of Led Zeppelin. Other interviewees for the 20-episode season include Robby Krieger and John Densmore of the Doors, Shania Twain, Eddie Money, Styx, John Mellencamp, The Oak Ridge Boys and Billy Ray Cyrus. The series celebrated its 100th episode on October 2 when it returned for the second half of season six with special guest The Beatles' Ringo Starr, with older episodes now also broadcast in the UK via the BIOgraphy channel found on the Pluto TV app.

The Big Interview was renewed for a seventh season, which premiered on Tuesday, April 16, 2019 with former Journey frontman Steve Perry. The new season line-up also includes Paul Stanley, Cyndi Lauper, Foreigner members Mick Jones and Lou Gramm, REO Speedwagon, Billy Bob Thornton, Carl and Rob Reiner, Travis Tritt, Boz Scaggs, Paul Shaffer, Brian Johnson of AC/DC, Cheap Trick, Chicago members Robert Lamm and Lee Loughnane, Bret Michaels, Alice Cooper, Little Big Town, Bob Costas, David Byrne, America, Bryan Cranston, Jon Anderson of Yes and Doug Gray of The Marshall Tucker Band.

===== Rock & Roll Road Trip with Sammy Hagar =====
Rock & Roll Road Trip with Sammy Hagar Presented by Mercury Insurance is an original series featuring Sammy Hagar as he drives across the country to interview and jam with influential artists including Tommy Lee, Bob Weir, Alice Cooper, and Nancy Wilson. The series also presents Hagar's personal experiences and rules of the road, as he tours with his group The Circle. The six-episode first season premiered on AXS TV on January 24, 2016. The series premiered in March 2017 with guests including John Mayer, Melissa Etheridge, Toby Keith, John Mellencamp and Mick Fleetwood and returned for its second half in July 2017 with guests including Don Felder, Styx, Vince Neil, Chad Smith, Shep Gordon, Darryl McDaniels and Adam Levine. AXS TV announced that Rock & Roll Road Trip was renewed for a third season in 2017 and premiered in April 2018 with guests including Dave Grohl, Roger Daltrey, Sarah McLachlan, Bob Weir, Pat Benatar and Neil Giraldo.

AXS TV announced a fourth season, which premiered on Sunday, May 5. Guests for the new season include Willie Nelson, Rick Springfield, Guy Fieri, Cheech & Chong, Charlie Daniels, Jimmie Johnson, Robby Krieger, Joe Bonamassa, Jason Bonham and more.

===== Real Money with Eddie Money =====
AXS TV announced in September 2017 it had greenlit to a 10-episode reality series chronicling the daily lives of Eddie Money, his wife Laurie and their five kids. Production for Real Money began in Q4 2017 and the series premiered on Sunday, April 8, 2018. In June 2018, the series was greenlit for an expanded 12-episode second season with production set to begin in Q3 2018 and a premiere in early 2019.

The second season of Real Money premiered on Sunday, May 5, 2019. During a midseason episode, Money revealed his cancer diagnosis. Money died the day after the episode's airing.

===== The Day The Rock Star Died =====
In August 2018, AXS TV announced a new docu-series profiling the lives and deaths of some of music's most influential artists called The Day The Rock Star Died. Premiered on October 2, 2018, the 15-part series examines artists including Tom Petty, Janis Joplin, Jimi Hendrix, Michael Jackson, Elvis Presley and Whitney Houston.

===== The Top Ten Revealed =====
The Top Ten Revealed spotlights best-of lists on a variety of rock-related themes, covering topics such as best guitar intros, Vietnam anthems and '80s rock ballads. The series debuted in February 2018, with host and executive producer Katie Daryl joined by a rotating panel of experts including Lita Ford, Guns N' Roses drummer Steven Adler and former Pantera percussionist Vinnie Paul, among others. The series returned for season two in January 2019, and for season 3 in April 2020.

===== The Very VERY Best of the 70s =====
The Very VERY Best of the 70s puts the spotlight on the enduring films, series, and pop culture moments that defined the 1970s. The series is executive produced by Katie Daryl who guides a rotating panel of celebrity guests each week including Fred Willard, Morgan Fairchild, Barry Williams, Jimmie Walker, Michael Winslow, Sebastian Bach, Mark Steines, Jaleel White, George Wallace, Anson Williams, Dee Wallace, Todd Bridges, Mindy Cohn, Bob Eubanks, Elisabeth Röhm, David Chokachi and Catherine Bach.

The series premiered its first season on Thursday, May 16.

===== The X Factor UK =====
Since 2014, AXS TV has broadcast The X Factor UK, with the episodes airing 24 hours after their respective UK broadcasts. The series premiered on Sunday, August 31, 2014, marking the first time that the British series had aired in the U.S. The 11th season notably featured the return of Simon Cowell and Cheryl Fernandez-Versini to the judging panel, joining music manager Louis Walsh and pop singer Mel B, making her debut as a full-time judge. Ben Haenow was the winner of this season.

The series has continued to air annually on AXS TV, most recently with its third season on the network, the show's 13th season overall, which premiered on August 28, 2016, with Cowell and Walsh, along with the return of judges Sharon Osbourne and Nicole Sherzinger, and presenter Dermot O'Leary, to X Factor UK. The X Factor UK returned for its fourth season on AXS TV, and 14th season overall, on September 3 and 4, 2017; all four judges from the previous year returned.

The X Factor UK returned for its fifth season on the network (15th overall) in September 2018 with Simon Cowell joined by new judges One Direction's Louis Tomlinson, singer-songwriter Robbie Williams and his wife actress and TV presenter Ayda Williams.

===== TRUNKFest with Eddie Trunk =====
In October 2017, AXS TV greenlit a new series starring music historian and TV and Radio host Eddie Trunk called TRUNKFest with Eddie Trunk premiering in 2018. The program gives viewers a front row seat to some of the nation's biggest music festivals as Trunk travels across the country interviewing bands, visiting booths, sampling festival cuisine, and mingling with the attendees. Trunk previously hosted the documentary series Reel to Real on the network in 2016. TRUNKFest with Eddie Trunk premiered on July 1, 2018, with a trip to the Sturgis Motorcycle Rally. TRUNKFest was renewed for a second season, which premiered on July 7, 2019.

===== Paul Shaffer Plus One =====
Paul Shaffer sits down with his famous friends and colleagues across the music industry in this weekly interview series. Season one guests include Joe Walsh, Graham Nash, Sammy Hagar, Billy Gibbons, Donald Fagen, Buddy Guy, Spinal Tap bassist Derek Smalls (Harry Shearer) and Smokey Robinson.

The series premiered on AXS TV Sunday, September 15 and also aired on Shaffer's SiriusXM radio show.

== List of programs broadcast by AXS TV ==
=== Acquired programming ===
- Nashville
- Hell's Kitchen
- Hot Ones
- Just For Laughs Gags

=== Former programming ===
- Drinking Made Easy (2010-2012)
- The Ronnie Wood Show (2012)
- Ex-Wives of Rock (2012-2014)
- Gotham Comedy Live (2012-2019)
- The Voice Versus with Michael Schiavello (2012-2017)
- The Big Interview with Dan Rather (2013-2021)
- The World's Greatest Tribute Bands hosted by Katie Daryl (2013-2017)
- Tom Green Live (2013-2014)
- Exploring Kaman (2014)
- The X Factor UK (2014-2018)
- Discovering Lucy Angel (2015)
- Hoff the Record (2015-2016)
- Breaking Band (2016)
- Rock & Roll Road Trip with Sammy Hagar (2016-2020)
- The Day The Rock Star Died (2018-2019)
- Real Money with Eddie Money (2018-2019)
- The Top Ten Revealed with Katie Daryl (2018-2024)
- Trunkfest with Eddie Trunk (2018-2019)
- Paul Shaffer Plus One (2019)
- The Very VERY Best of the 70s (2019-2020)
- Music's Greatest Mysteries (2020-2022)
- The Very VERY Best of the 80s with Kelly Osbourne (2022-2024)

==== Sports ====
- AXS TV Fights (2007-2026)
- NHL on HDNet (2001-2008)
- MLS on HDNet (2003-2006)
- NASCAR on HDNet (2005-2007; Cup Series race replays and tape delayed races from the NASCAR Busch East Series)
- Inside MMA (2007-2018)
- Monon Bell Classic (2007-2016)
- NCAA Battle 4 Atlantis (2011-2016)

==== Pro wrestling ====
- ROH on HDNet (2009-2011)
- Women of Wrestling (2019-2020)
- TNA Impact! (2019-2026)
- Inoki Genome Federation
- Inside MMA (2007-2018)
- New Japan Pro-Wrestling (2015-2019, 2022-2025)
- Women of Wrestling (2019-2020)
- Before the Impact (2021-2022)

==== Anime ====
- Fate/stay night: Unlimited Blade Works
- My Hero Academia

== HDNet Movies ==
HDNet Movies was launched in January 2003 as a spin-off of HDNet (now AXS TV). The network features theatrically released films and documentaries, which are presented in high definition and without commercial interruption or editing for content. Programming showcases a wide variety of films including Academy Award winners, action films, scifi films, and westerns. It regularly features special, hosted movie events such as And The Oscar Goes To... Presented by Richard Roeper, Totally 80s Month with Judge Reinhold and Rob Zombie's 13 Nights of Halloween.

HDNet Movies is available nationally on Dish, DirecTV, and AT&T U-verse; regionally on cable providers such as Charter Spectrum, Service Electric, Suddenlink Communications, Time Warner Spectrum, and SureWest; and on the streaming service Sling TV.

== Canadian carriage ==
In the Fall of 2006, HDNet became available in Canada on Rogers Cable, Bell Satellite TV and Cogeco Cable; Shaw Cable began carrying the network in April 2007. The network would be dropped by Bell and Rogers upon its relaunch as AXS TV.

After Anthem purchased AXS TV, the channel became a sister to its domestic channels Fight Network, GameTV, and Game+. AXS TV has since syndicated some of its original programming to these sister networks. In December of that year, AXS reached a new carriage deal with Bell TV, including its Bell Fibe TV services and over-the-top services Alt TV and Virgin TV.
