= The Big Interview with Dan Rather =

American television series

The Big Interview with Dan Rather is an American television series on AXS TV, hosted by Dan Rather, in which he interviews major celebrities. In 2021 it entered into its 9th season, with close to 150 episodes total.

== The show ==
Near the end of his own career after leaving CBS News in a cloud of controversy, Rather soon was signed by AXS TV. In 2013 his show kicked off with interviews of stars including Roger Daltrey and Linda Ronstadt. This foreshadowed a trend of Rather getting an increasing proportion of rock stars, even though he says of himself that he missed the Rock & Roll bandwagon until he was much older.

In the course of its eight seasons, Rather interviewed a list of noteworthies including:

=== Season 1 ===
- Aaron Sorkin, Roger Daltrey & Cody Simpson, Merle Haggard, Linda Ronstadt & Daryl Hannah, Melissa Etheridge

=== Season 2 ===
- Oliver Stone, Edward Norton, Crosby, Stills & Nash, Jane Lynch, Carol Burnett, Alan Alda, David Simon, Dolly Parton, Darius Rucker, Aaron Neville & Trombone Shorty, Charlie Daniels, Simon Cowell, Loretta Lynn, Jack White, Kenny Rogers, Gene Simmons, Annie Lennox

=== Season 3 ===
- Wynonna Judd, Carlos Santana, Marty Stuart, Weird Al Yankovic, Daryl Hall, Don Rickles, Trisha Yearwood, Vince Gill, Lindsey Buckingham, Josh Groban, Florida Georgia Line, Frankie Valli, Paul Haggis, Emmylou Harris, John Leguizamo, Pat Benatar and Neil Giraldo, Rascal Flatts, Dwight Yoakam, Bob Weir, Heart, Patti LaBelle, Gregg Allman, Bryan Adams, Charley Pride, Quentin Tarantino, Kathy Ireland

=== Season 4 ===
- John Fogerty. Benicio Del Toro, Willie Nelson, Tanya Tucker, Russell Simmons, Big & Rich, Sammy Hagar, Phil Collins, David Hasselhoff, Neil Young, Meat Loaf, Martina McBride, Gloria and Emilio Estefan, Mike Love, Carly Simon, Keith Urban

=== Season 5 ===
- Kid Rock, Ice Cube, Kix Brooks, Crystal Gayle, Billy Gibbons, Norah Jones, Clint Black, Roger Waters, Sheryl Crow, Sharon Osbourne, The Doobie Brothers, Geddy Lee, Jewel, Kiefer Sutherland, Steve Miller, Peter Frampton, Michael Stipe & Mike Mills, Steve Van Zandt

== Series overview ==
Season	Episodes	Originally released	
Season	Episodes	First released	Last released
1	7	September 16, 2013	February 10, 2014
2	18	February 14, 2014	December 16, 2014
3	27	January 13, 2015	December 29, 2015
4	18	January 12, 2016	December 13, 2016
5	18	February 14, 2017	December 5, 2017
6	21	March 13, 2018	December 18, 2018
7	22	April 16, 2019	December 18, 2019
8	10	April 15, 2020	January 27, 2021
9	6	April 14, 2021	May 19, 2021

== Episodes ==
=== Season 1 (2013–14) ===
No. overall	No. in season	Title	Original release date
1	1	"Aaron Sorkin"	September 16, 2013
Screenwriter Aaron Sorkin discusses his writing process, his critics and the success of `The West Wing', `The Newsroom' and `The Social Network'.
2	2	"Roger Daltrey & Cody Simpson"	September 23, 2013
Roger Daltrey of The Who chats about the ups and downs of stardom. Australian star Cody Simpson discusses his work with Daltrey's teen cancer foundation.
3	3	"Merle Haggard"	September 30, 2013
Country music legend and one of the pioneers of `The Bakersfield Sound', Merle Haggard discusses his life and career.
4	4	"Linda Ronstadt & Daryl Hannah"	October 7, 2013
Singer Linda Ronstadt talks about her Parkinson's diagnosis; actress Daryl Hannah discusses her film career and relationship with the Kennedy family.
5	5	"Melissa Etheridge"	October 14, 2013
The Grammy winner opens up to Dan Rather about her music career, her battle with breast cancer and her activism with gay rights and the environment.
6	6	"Grammy Week - The Nominees"	January 20, 2014
Rather speaks with crossover country singer Darius Rucker (formerly of `Hootie and the Blowfish') and Dionne Warwick about their Grammy nominations.
7	7	"Grammy Week - The Winners"	January 20, 2014
Rather commemorates the Grammy Awards by interviewing previous winners Linda Ronstadt, Roger Daltrey, Melissa Etheridge and Merle Haggard.

=== Season 2 (2014) ===
No. overall	No. in season	Title	Original release date
9	1	"Oliver Stone"	February 24, 2014
The director of `Platoon' and `Wall Street' reveals how fighting in Vietnam, a stint in prison and other personal experiences inform his filmmaking.
10	2	"Edward Norton"	March 3, 2014
The Oscar-nominated actor chats with Rather about his 20-year career, his resistance to fame and his passion for philanthropy around the world.
11	3	"Crosby, Stills & Nash"	March 10, 2014
Rock N' Roll Hall of Fame alumnus David Crosby, Stephen Stills and Graham Nash discuss their personal lives and friendships.
12	4	"Jane Lynch"	March 17, 2014
Award-winning actress Jane Lynch discusses her lengthy career, which includes more than 100 credits, and opens up about her personal life.
13	5	"Carol Burnett"	March 24, 2014
Television legend Carol Burnett sits down with Dan Rather to discuss highlights and lowlights of her career and the future of the medium.
14	6	"Alan Alda"	March 31, 2014
Emmy winner Alan Alda discusses his unorthodox childhood, his diverse acting career and his new focus on bringing science education to television.
15	7	"David Simon"	April 7, 2014
David Simon opens up about his journey from crime reporter to Emmy Award-winning creator of `The Wire', `Homicide: Life on the Street' and `Treme'.
16	8	"Dolly Parton"	April 14, 2014
Rather visits Dollywood to interview country music legend Dolly Parton about her memorable career and her foundation, the Imagination Library.
17	9	"Darius Rucker"	April 21, 2014
Country artist Darius Rucker discusses life before Nashville, Tenn.
18	10	"Aaron Neville & Trombone Shorty"	April 28, 2014
Aaron Neville discusses growing up in New Orleans; Trombone Shorty talks about New Orleans music traditions.
19	11	"Charlie Daniels"	May 24, 2014
Dan Rather goes to Nashville with Charlie Daniels.
20	12	"Simon Cowell"	August 23, 2014
We meet the mind behind the highly successful reality program `The X-Factor UK'. Simon Cowell is a one-of-a-kind media entrepreneur.
21	13	"Loretta Lynn"	September 9, 2014
The talented and accomplished Loretta Lynn takes a quick break from her latest tour to chat with Dan Rather.
22	14	"Jack White"	September 16, 2014
What does legendary guitarist Jack White have to say to Dan Rather? Turns out, a lot. He shows side of the rock 'n' roller his millions of fans have never seen.
23	15	"Kenny Rogers"	September 23, 2014
He's now a member of the Country Music Hall Of Fame, and that's where Kenny Rogers opened up to Dan Rather about his illustrious career.
24	16	"Gene Simmons"	September 30, 2014
He's the most famous member of KISS, but Gene Simmons is also a tongue wagging, fire spitting, media and marketing mogul.
25	17	"Annie Lennox"	November 11, 2014
Oscar and Grammy award winning musician and activist Annie Lennox discusses her new album, "Nostalgia," with Dan Rather.
26	18	"Great Conversations of 2014"	December 16, 2014
A look back at some of our favourite 2014 interviews with the hottest names in music and entertainment.

=== Season 3 (2015) ===
No. overall	No. in season	Title	Original release date
27	1	"Wynonna Judd"	January 13, 2015
Rather interviews country singer Wynonna Judd.
28	2	"Carlos Santana"	January 20, 2015
Rather catches up with musician Carlos Santana in Las Vegas.
29	3	"Marty Stuart"	January 27, 2015
Country singer Marty Stuart discusses his songs, career and studying music.
30	4	"Weird Al Yankovic"	February 3, 2015
Comedian and musician Al Yankovic invites Dan Rather to his home.
31	5	"Daryl Hall"	February 10, 2015
Hall of Fame musician Daryl Hall discusses his career and passion for restoring homes.
32	6	"Don Rickles"	February 17, 2015
Don Rickles, an insult comic and frequent guest on "The Tonight Show Starring Johnny Carson," discusses his career with Dan Rather.
33	7	"Trisha Yearwood"	April 14, 2015
Country singer Trisha Yearwood discusses her singing career and her cooking show.
34	8	"Vince Gill"	April 21, 2015
Country singer Vince Gill.
35	9	"Lindsey Buckingham"	April 28, 2015
Songwriter for Fleetwood Mac, Lindsey Buckingham talks about the groups reunion.
36	10	"Josh Groban"	May 5, 2015
Josh Groban discusses his long and successful music career.
37	11	"Florida Georgia Line"	May 12, 2015
The country group discusses how they define their music.
38	12	"Frankie Valli"	May 19, 2015
An interview with Frankie Valli, the lead singer of Four Seasons.
39	13	"Paul Haggis"	May 26, 2015
Academy Award winning writer, producer and director Paul Haggis.
40	14	"Emmylou Harris"	July 7, 2015
Dan Rather spends time with Emmylou Harris.
41	15	"John Leguizamo"	July 14, 2015
Actor and comedian John Leguizamo discusses his impressive list of film and stage credits.
42	16	"Pat Benatar and Neil Giraldo"	July 21, 2015
Pat Benatar and Neil Giraldo sit with Dan.
43	17	"Rascal Flatts"	July 28, 2015
Rascal Flatts sits with Dan before becoming the first country band to play the Hard Rock in Las Vegas.
44	18	"Dwight Yoakam"	August 4, 2015
Dwight Yoakam discusses making it big in country music despite being far from Nashville.
45	19	"Bob Weir"	August 11, 2015
Bob Weir, a founding member of the Grateful Dead, discusses the band's legacy and talks about its farewell shows.
46	20	"Heart"	October 20, 2015
Ann and Nancy Wilson of the rock group Heart.
47	21	"Patti LaBelle"	October 27, 2015
Patti LaBelle, often referred to as the "Godmother of Soul" reveals how she's stayed on stage for over 50 years.
48	22	"Gregg Allman"	November 3, 2015
A conversation with Gregg Allman from his home in Georgia.
49	23	"Bryan Adams"	November 10, 2015
Singer Bryan Adams finally slows down to speak with Dan.
50	24	"Charley Pride"	November 17, 2015
Dan sits down with country music star Charlie Pride on tour.
51	25	"Quentin Tarantino"	November 24, 2015
A conversation with the outspoken Oscar winning director Quentin Tarantino in his private screening room.
52	26	"Kathy Ireland"	December 1, 2015
Model and philanthropist Kathy Ireland discusses her friendship with Dame Elizabeth Taylor, and the impact that the late actress had and continues to have on her life, and her activism on behalf of HIV/AIDS.
53	27	"Great Conversations of 2015"	December 29, 2015
The most insightful discussions and warmest moments with Dan and his guests.

=== Season 4 (2016) ===
No. overall	No. in season	Title	Original release date
54	1	"John Fogerty"	January 12, 2016
John Fogerty of Creedence Clearwater Revival looks back on his illustrious career.
55	2	"Benicio del Toro"	January 19, 2016
Oscar winner and star of the current hit Sicario talks about making it in Hollywood. Plus, his advice for those who want to become successful actors.
56	3	"Willie Nelson"	January 26, 2016
He's on the road again. Dan catches up with music legend Willie Nelson aboard his new tour bus.
57	4	"Tanya Tucker"	February 2, 2016
The life and times of the country music singer whose career began at 13-years-old.
58	5	"Russell Simmons"	February 9, 2016
A conversation with the hip hop music producer.
59	6	"Big & Rich"	February 16, 2016
The country music duo invite Dan to a party at John Rich's Nashville home to celebrate their new hit.
60	7	"Sammy Hagar"	February 26, 2016
The Red Rocker's life of fame and fortune outside of music and with Van Halen.
61	8	"Phil Collins"	March 1, 2016
Singer-songwriter Phil Collins talks about his anticipated return to the music scene, his record breaking success and a possible future partnership with singer Adele.
62	9	"David Hasselhoff"	March 26, 2016
A conversation with the tireless David Hasselhoff, one of the most watched people in television history.
63	10	"Neil Young"	September 13, 2016
The music legend discusses his career, his music and his environmental activism.
64	11	"Meat Loaf"	September 20, 2016
Meat Loaf discusses his music, his passion, acting and shows his collection of sports memorabilia.
65	12	"Martina McBride"	September 27, 2016
A country music superstar who has never forgotten her roots, Martina McBride talks about her family, her controversial songs and her new album.
66	13	"Olivia Newton-John"	October 4, 2016
A sit-down with the star of Grease and a look backstage before her sold out Las Vegas performance.
67	14	"Michael Buble"	October 11, 2016
Big band crooner and pop superstar, Michael Buble, opens up about fame, family and the importance of taking risks.
68	15	"Gloria and Emilio Estefan"	October 18, 2016
They brought the latin beat to mainstream music and were honoured at The White House. Gloria and Emilio Estefan discuss the influence of The Miami Sound Machine.
69	16	"Mike Love"	October 25, 2016
The original Beach Boy front man discusses the group and his relationship with Brian Wilson.
70	17	"Carly Simon"	November 1, 2016
Legendary artist Carly Simon discusses her career, her relationships and growing up in a famous family.
72	18	"Keith Urban"	December 13, 2016
Dan sits down with Keith Urban on his 'Ripcord' tour.

=== Season 5 (2017) ===
No. overall	No. in season	Title	Original release date
73	1	"Kid Rock"	February 14, 2017
Dan visits with Kid Rock at his Tennessee mountaintop "Trouble-wide" motor home.
74	2	"Ice Cube"	February 21, 2017
An interview with Ice Cube, a pioneer of gangster rap and one of Hollywood's most successful and sought after actors and filmmakers.
75	3	"Kix Brooks"	February 28, 2017
Dan joins country superstar Kix Brooks of Brooks and Dunn at his award winning vineyard.
76	4	"Crystal Gayle"	March 7, 2017
Crystal Gayle talks about her hit-making career and her induction into The Grand Ole Opry.
77	5	"Billy Gibbons"	March 14, 2017
The legendary frontman for ZZ Top, Billy Gibbons, joins Dan for a look back at the band's 40 years together.
78	6	"Norah Jones"	March 21, 2017
Norah Jones discusses her music, being a celebrity and how being a parent has changed her.
79	7	"Clint Black"	March 28, 2017
Dan Rather sits down with Clint Black at his Nashville home.
80	8	"Roger Waters"	April 4, 2017
One of the founders of Pink Floyd, Roger Waters discusses his music, politics and upcoming tour.
81	9	"Sheryl Crow"	April 11, 2017
Dan visits Sheryl Crow at her Nashville recording studio to discuss her new album and old times.
82	10	"Sharon Osbourne"	October 10, 2017
Sharon Osbourne discusses her career, marriage and life in rock and roll.
83	11	"The Doobie Brothers"	October 17, 2017
The Doobie Brothers discuss their incredible run.
84	12	"Geddy Lee"	October 24, 2017
Rush's Geddy Lee has a fascinating conversation with Dan.
85	13	"Jewel"	October 31, 2017
From growing up in the wilds of Alaska, to living out of her car, to stardom, a remarkable interview with an American treasure, Jewel.
86	14	"Kiefer Sutherland"	November 7, 2017
Kiefer Sutherland proves that he's more than an actor with his new album.
87	15	"Steve Miller"	November 14, 2017
A conversation with legendary bluesman, jazz musician and pioneer of psychedelic rock.
88	16	"Peter Frampton"	November 21, 2017
Peter Frampton describes the ups and downs of his career and performs one of the hits that made him an icon.
89	17	"R.E.M's Michael Stipe & Mike Mills"	November 28, 2017
R.E.M.'s Mike Mills and Michael Stipe discuss their lives, careers and the song Dan Rather inspired.
90	18	"Steven Van Zandt"	December 5, 2017
Steven Van Zandt discusses music, Bruce Springsteen and the Sopranos.

=== Season 6 (2018) ===
No. overall	No. in season	Title	Original release date
91	1	"Robert Plant"	March 13, 2018
Dan Rather sits down with Robert Plant, Led Zeppelin's legendary frontman, for a conversation touching on Plant's most personal lyrics and the stories behind some of rock's most lasting hits.
92	2	"The Doors"	March 20, 2018
The two surviving members of the Doors, John Densmore and Robby Krieger, reminisce about their music, the 60s, and the life and death of lead singer Jim Morrison.
93	3	"Eddie Money"	March 27, 2018
Singer-songwriter Eddie Money discusses his new reality show on AXS TV, his blue-collar roots, and the drug overdose that almost left him paralyzed.
94	4	"Shania Twain"	April 3, 2018
Best-selling female country music artist Shania Twain discusses her No. 1 album "Now", released 15 years after a battle with Lyme disease nearly took away her ability to sing.
95	5	"Billy Ray Cyrus"	April 10, 2018
Singer Billy Ray Cyrus opens up about the highs and lows of his career, from living in his car to performing at the Grammys to watching the careers of daughters Noah Cyrus and Miley Cyrus take off.
96	6	"Styx"	April 17, 2018
Dan joins three of Styx's legendary members for a Las Vegas performance and a candid interview about the past, present and future of one of rock's most enduring bands.
97	7	"John Mellencamp"	April 24, 2018
Legendary rocker John Mellencamp sits down for a no-holds-barred interview touching on politics, race relations and the state of the country.
98	8	"Oak Ridge Boys"	May 1, 2018
Five-time Grammy Award-winning country music group the Oak Ridge Boys discuss lessons learned after 50 years on the road together and sing a little of "Elvira," one of the catchiest country songs ever recorded.
99	9	"Best of Classic Rock"	May 8, 2018
Interviews with the biggest names in classic rock including Neil Young, Robert Plant, Roger Waters, and Crosby, Stills and Nash.
100	10	"Ringo Starr"	October 2, 2018
Musician Ringo Starr discusses what it was like as a member of the Beatles, and the struggles and successes of his life since.
101	11	"Rod Stewart"	October 9, 2018
Singer Rod Stewart discusses his life and legacy as he continues to pack arenas around the world 50 years into his career.
102	12	"Toby Keith"	October 16, 2018
Country singer Toby Keith celebrates the 25th anniversary of his breakout hit "Should've Been a Cowboy," and shares the stories behind his great successes.
103	13	"Lynyrd Skynyrd"	October 23, 2018
Legendary Southern rock band Lynyrd Skynyrd discusses its history and legacy as it embarks on a farewell tour.
104	14	"Kansas"	October 30, 2018
Dan Rather sits down with three members of the progressive rock band Kansas 40 years after the release of their iconic song "Dust in the Wind."
105	15	"Joan Baez"	November 6, 2018
Dan Rather sits down with folk trailblazer and human rights activist Joan Baez to discuss her music, past loves and recent decision to step away from the stage.
106	16	"Dan Aykroyd"	November 13, 2018
Actor Dan Aykroyd talks with Dan Rather about everything from "Ghostbusters" to his early days on TV's "Saturday Night Live" and the loss of his friend and fellow comic John Belushi.
107	17	"Buddy Guy"	November 20, 2018
Guitar legend Buddy Guy reflects on his life, career and the blues.
108	18	"Brian Setzer"	November 27, 2018
Brian Setzer sits down with Dan Rather to discuss the Stray Cats, the Brian Setzer Orchestra, and his love for forgotten genres of music.
109	19	"Ricky Skaggs"	December 4, 2018
Country and bluegrass musician Ricky Skaggs speaks with Dan Rather about growing up under the tutelage of legends, and then becoming one himself.
110	20	"Kenny Loggins"	December 11, 2018
Dan Rather sits down with '70s superstar and '80s soundtrack king Kenny Loggins to talk songwriting, soul searching and the stories behind some of the biggest hits for the big screen.
111	21	"Dickey Betts"	December 18, 2018
Responsible for some of the Allman Brothers Band's biggest hits, Dickey Betts speaks with Dan Rather about coming out of retirement and carrying on the band's legacy.

=== Season 7 (2019) ===
No. overall	No. in season	Title	Original release date
112	1	"Steve Perry"	April 16, 2019
Steve Perry, former lead singer of Journey, discusses why he walked away from the spotlight at the height of his career and what brought him back to music now.
113	2	"Paul Stanley"	April 23, 2019
Musician Paul Stanley of KISS discusses everything from his love of painting to how KISS became one of the most successful rock bands in music history.
114	3	"Cyndi Lauper"	April 30, 2019
Grammy, Emmy and Tony award-winning singer Cyndi Lauper chats with Dan Rather about her groundbreaking career.
115	4	"Foreigner"	May 7, 2019
In their first interview together in over 20 years, Foreigner's founding member Mick Jones and original lead singer Lou Gramm discuss music, their falling out and what the future holds.
116	5	"REO Speedwagon"	May 14, 2019
REO Speedwagon members Kevin Cronin, Neal Doughty, Bruce Hall, Dave Amato and Bryan Hitt talk about making hits and the keys to their ongoing success.
117	6	"Billy Bob Thornton"	May 21, 2019
Writer, director, musician and Academy award-winning actor Billy Bob Thornton sits down with Dan Rather for an insightful conversation about movies, music and why he has moved from the silver screen to the small screen.
118	7	"Carl and Rob Reiner"	May 28, 2019
Directors and actors Carl and Rob Reiner.
119	8	"Travis Tritt"	June 4, 2019
Dan Rather talks to country music superstar Travis Tritt about what country music was, is and should be.
120	9	"Bozz Scaggs"	June 11, 2019
Dan Rather talks to singer-songwriter Boz Scaggs about his life and career.
121	10	"Paul Shaffer"	June 18, 2019
Musician, television personality, and radio host Paul Shaffer sits down with Dan Rather for a wide-ranging conversation.
122	11	"Brian Johnson"	October 2, 2019
Brian Johnson, the former lead singer of AC/DC, talks about his rock 'n' roll legacy and life in the spotlight.
123	12	"Cheap Trick"	October 9, 2019
Power pop icons Robin Zander, Tom Petersson and Rick Nielsen of Cheap Trick talk about their early success, signature hits, and why after 45 years together, they're still touring and making new music.
124	13	"Chicago"	October 16, 2019
Dan Rather chats with Robert Lamm and Lee Loughnane of the legendary rock band Chicago about the longevity of their career and unforgettable music.
125	14	"Bret Michaels"	October 23, 2019
Singer-songwriter Bret Michaels talks to Dan Rather about the challenges of living life with type 1 diabetes, his early songs with Poison and his successful solo career.
126	15	"Alice Cooper"	October 30, 2019
Dan Rather sits down with shock rock Alice Cooper.
127	16	"Little Big Town"	November 6, 2019
The country music superstars of Little Big Town talk to Dan Rather about their difficult path to success, their groundbreaking smash hit Girl Crush, and life on the road.
128	17	"Bob Costas"	November 13, 2019
Dan Rather sits down with one of America's premier sportscasters, Bob Costas, to talk about his passion for baseball, disdain for football and the unlikely way he fell in love with sports in the first place.
129	18	"David Byrne"	November 20, 2019
The former Talking Heads front man sits down with Dan Rather to talk about his many creative endeavors and decades-long career.
130	19	"America"	November 27, 2019
Dan Rather interviews Dewey Bunnell and Gerry Beckley, the founding duo of the band America, about their irresistible hits and long life on the road.
131	20	"Bryan Cranston"	December 4, 2019
Emmy and Tony Award winner Bryan Cranston sits down with Dan Rather for a candid conversation.
132	21	"Jon Anderson"	December 11, 2019
Dan Rather sits down with one of the most recognizable voices of progressive rock, Jon Anderson of YES.
133	22	"The Marshall Tucker Band"	December 18, 2019
Southern rock pioneer Doug Gray of The Marshall Tucker Band gets personal about his upbringing, his drive to perform and the darker moments of life on the road.

=== Season 8 (2020-21) ===
No. overall	No. in season	Title	Original release date
134	1	"Huey Lewis"	April 15, 2020
Charismatic rocker Huey Lewis sits down with Dan Rather to talk about his many hits, his struggle with hearing loss and the uncertain future of his music career.
135	2	"Debbie Harry"	April 22, 2020
Rock and style icon Debbie Harry chats with Dan Rather about her groundbreaking career extending back to her time as the frontwoman of Blondie.
136	3	"Don Felder"	April 29, 2020
Chatting with Don Felder about his legendary career with the Eagles and his thoughts on music today.
137	4	"Robbie Robertson"	May 6, 2020
Dan Rather talks to Robbie Robertson, guitarist and creative force behind The Band, about his music, "The Last Waltz" and other projects with filmmaker Martin Scorsese.
138	5	"Ian Anderson"	May 13, 2020
Jethro Tull's Ian Anderson sits down to talk about his five decades as a progressive rock idol.
139	6	"Don McLean"	May 20, 2020
Dan Rather interviews "American Pie" songwriter Don McLean about his acclaimed music and life in the spotlight.
140	7	"Perry Farrell"	January 6, 2021
Dan Rather sits down with musician Perry Farrell of Jane's Addiction to discuss his expansive influence on the music industry.
141	8	"Luke Combs"	January 13, 2021
Luke Combs talks about his rise to success and the state of country music today.
142	9	"Regina King"	January 20, 2021
Dan Rather interviews Academy Award winning actress, Regina King, about her remarkable on-screen career and her directorial debut.
143	10	"Randy and Mary Travis"	January 27, 2021
Country music legend Randy Travis and his wife Mary.

=== Season 9 (2021) ===
No. overall	No. in season	Title	Original release date
145	1	"Hillary Scott & Chris Tyrrell"	April 14, 2021
Dan Rather sits down with Hillary Scott of the Grammy-winning country trio Lady A, and her husband, drummer Chris Tyrrell, to reflect on their lives as performers, partners, and parents to three young daughters.
146	2	"Adam Horovitz & Kathleen Hanna"	April 21, 2021
Beastie Boy Adam Horovitz and rocker Kathleen Hanna join Dan Rather to talk about their influential careers and lasting relationship.
147	3	"Fogerty's Factory - John Fogerty & Family"	April 28, 2021
American rock legend John Fogerty returns with his children Shane, Tyler, and Kelsy, to talk about starting their family band during the pandemic and what's to come from the next generation of Fogerty musicians.
148	4	"Jason Isbell & Amanda Shires"	May 5, 2021
Musicians Jason Isbell and Amanda Shires sit down with Dan Rather for a conversation about music, marriage, and their latest projects.
149	5	"Lil Jon & Slade"	May 12, 2021
Rapper, DJ, and record producer Lil Jon and his son, rising DJ and producer Slade, talk about their lives, careers and upcoming projects.
150	6	"Michelle Branch & Patrick Carney"	May 19, 2021
Dan Rather catches up with hitmaker Michelle Branch and husband Patrick Carney of "The Black Keys" reflect on their family, influences, and their recent collaborations in the studio.
