= Michael Schiavello =

Australian sports commentator

- Born: Michael Schiavello; 10 April 1975 (age 51); Melbourne, Australia
- Other name: The Voice
- Occupations: Sports commentator, writer
- Years active: 1991–present

Michael Schiavello (born 10 April 1975) is an Australian sports commentator and journalist. He has commentated for AXS TV, K-1, Dream, Maximum Fighting Championship, King of the Cage, ONE Championship and The Contender Asia. He has also written for more than 50 publications worldwide, was the long-serving editor of Blitz Magazine, was the editor of International Kickboxer magazine until 2009, was a feature writer for Inside Sport magazine, and was the youngest ever inductee to the Best Australian Sports Writing Awards.

== Commentating ==
Schiavello first got his start in commentating at age 16 at a track and field event in Melbourne. Shortly after, he began hosting his own radio sports show on Southern FM where he was called "Mr Scoop" for his ability to score interviews with world-famous sports stars between high school and homework. Some of the famous sports personalities Schiavello interviewed for his community radio show included soccer stars Diego Maradona and Pele, tennis stars Gabriela Sabatini, Stefan Edberg and Goran Ivanisevic, cricket stars Richie Richardson, Wasim Akram, and Mohammad Azharuddin, pro wrestler The Junkyard Dog, and more. When Schiavello was 21, a fight promoter in Melbourne asked him to commentate for the video of his show. Other promoters heard it, liked his style, and asked him to do their shows. Then, when Foxtel (Fox Sports) came on air in 1996, they asked him to commentate for them.

Schiavello is currently commentating for Singapore-based MMA promotion One Championship. He has been the voice of K-1, Dream, Sengoku, The Contender Asia, and AXS TV Fights (formerly HDNet), having signed with the North American broadcaster in July 2009 after capturing the attention of the network's billionaire owner, Mark Cuban. He left AXS TV in 2017. Other promotions he has commentated for include: MFC, Invicta Fighting Championships, XFC, Adrenaline, Evolution, XPlosion, King of the Cage, BAMMA, and Legacy Fighting Championship. Schiavello has also commentated for the 2006 Commonwealth Games and the 2008 Olympic Games in Beijing. He also helmed the biggest pay-per-view event in Australian television history when, alongside the late Clinton Grybas, Kostya Tszyu, Adam Watt, and Paul Briggs, he was part of the broadcast team for Danny Green vs Anthony Mundine. Schiavello has commentated on over 4000 fights in more than 15 countries since 1996. Cities he has commentated in include Tokyo, Amsterdam, Las Vegas, Bucharest, Beijing, Montego Bay, Lodz, Budapest, Omaha, Edmonton, Seoul, Auckland, and Honolulu.

Schiavello made a guest appearance on The Joe Rogan Experience podcast on 24 July 2011. In August 2015, he was a guest commentator for Lucha Underground's Ultima Lucha event.

In 2010, Schiavello became the first commentator to ever be nominated for the "Leading Man" Award at the World MMA Awards in Las Vegas. In September 2011, he was nominated for "Best Sports Host" at the 2011 CableFAX Cable TV Awards.

== The Voice Versus ==
In 2010, HDNet launched The Voice Versus series in which host Michael Schiavello interviewed various combat sports personalities. The show was a one-hour sit down interview show with some of the biggest names in sports and entertainment including:

- Stone Cold Steve Austin
- Frank Dux
- George Foreman
- Badr Hari
- Hulk Hogan
- Sugar Ray Leonard
- Jason "Mayhem" Miller
- Tito Ortiz
- Alistair Overeem
- Joe Rogan
- Steven Seagal
- Wanderlei Silva
- Dana White
- Michael Jai White
- Fedor Emelianenko
- Bas Rutten
- Royce Gracie

Nick Diaz was scheduled to appear on the show in July 2013, but he did not show up for the interview. To date, The Voice Versus has filmed in four countries: the United States, Australia, South Korea, and the Netherlands.

== Personal life ==
Michael Schiavello relocated from his native Melbourne to Las Vegas with his wife, Irena, in September 2011. In 2017, the family decided to return to Australia.

Schiavello became a Freemason in 2009, joining Balwyn-Deepdene Lodge No. 275 where he was raised to a Master Mason in 2010, before switching to Daylite Lodge No. 44 upon his relocation to the US.

== Books ==
- Bouncer! Real Life Stories [1998]
- Offside! The Wild Side of Soccer [2000]
- Bodies of the Rich and Famous [2000]
- ReflexJack [2001]
- Know Thyself: Using the Symbols of Freemasonry to Improve Your Life [2016]
- Freemasonry's Hidden Brain Science [2019]
