= Katie Daryl =

American television host and producer

- Education: Arizona State University
- Occupations: Television host, television producer
- Employer: AXS TV
- Known for: TMZ, The Top Ten Revealed, The World's Greatest Tribute Bands
- Awards: CableFAX Program Award – "Best Host – Music" (2017)

Katie Daryl is an American television host and producer, best known for her work on the Hollywood gossip show TMZ and currently the host and executive producer of the AXS TV music count-down series The Top Ten Revealed.

Katie started her broadcasting career as a part-time radio DJ at the age of 15. While attending Arizona State University, where she was Fiesta Bowl Princess in 1999–2000, she moved her way up the radio chain and worked as a morning show radio producer for KISS-FM in Phoenix, Arizona. One of her jobs in college was an internship at the Sports Fan Radio Network through the Association for Women in Sports Media, in 1998. When she realized that morning radio meant waking up at 4 am, she moved to New York City where she became a reporter for the MTV political show "Choose or Lose". She then worked in FM radio in Dallas, Texas. Soon thereafter, she found herself sitting next to Mark Cuban as the co-host of "The Mark Cuban Show" for two seasons on UPN and CBS.

Katie joined Mark Cuban's HDNet team as host and producer of "True Music" in 2002, host of "Zippo Hot Tour" in 2005 and "Deadline!" from 2006–2012. The Mark Cuban-founded channel re-branded from HDNet to AXS TV on July 2, 2012, where she hosted and executive produced "The World's Greatest Tribute Bands" for eight seasons from 2013–2017, for which she won the CableFAX Program Award for "Best Host - Music" in 2017. Katie also contributes in a variety of hosting roles for the network.

In 2017, Katie Daryl began developing an original count-down series for AXS TV called The Top Ten Revealed, where Katie and a rotating panel of experts put the spotlight on a diverse range of music topics including the best guitar intros, Vietnam-era anthems and more. The series premiered with six episodes on February 11, 2018 and returned on July 1, 2018 with a second cycle of new episodes.

== Personal life ==
Katie is married to Amy Adams' brother Eddie.
