= NHL on HDNet =

American television series

- Created by: HDNet
- Starring: See commentators section
- Country of origin: United States

Production
- Running time: 150 minutes or until game ends

Original release
- Network: HDNet
- Release: October 4, 2001 – April 5, 2008

NHL on HDNet is a TV show that televises National Hockey League games on HDNet (broadcasting exclusively in high-definition form). The NHL was the first professional sports league to sign up with HDNet, when it launched in 2001.

== History ==
HDnet's coverage began in the 2001–02 season with a 65 game schedule. HDNet produced broadcasts in conjunction with several Fox Sports Net regional outlets, sharing audio and graphics with FSN's standard definition production units. NHL on HDNet prototypically, aired on Tuesday and Friday nights during its early years.

While there was no coverage during the 2004–05 season due to the lockout, HDNet instead, produced a series called NHL Relived, a special series featuring the best games from the 2003–04 season, including the NHL All-Star Game and Stanley Cup Playoff games.

When HDNet's coverage resumed following the lockout, they reduced their schedule from 65 games to 52 games (bumped up to 53 the following year) on Thursday and Saturday nights. By this time, it was apparent that HDNet would add games to this broadcast schedule bi-monthly so that they will be able to feature what they would consider hottest players, teams and match ups at the moment (a flexible schedule in other words).

For the 2007–08 season (HDNet's final season of NHL coverage), HDNet premiered the weekly program entitled Inside the NHL. Hosted by Dan Moriarty, Inside the NHL featured programming regarding the upcoming game airing on HDNet, in-depth interviews with the biggest stars in the NHL, the latest news from around league, the top highlights from the current week, and unique features showcasing NHL's biggest stars as well as celebrity fans. Inside the NHL was shot on the location of every HDNet Thursday night NHL game.

== High-definition overview ==
Unlike most other broadcasters offering high definition programming, HDNet is not available in standard definition. HDNet's sports programming also uses wider shots of the playing field or arena than most SD telecasts, since the network does not have to protect the shot for a 4:3 aspect ratio, giving HDNet the ability to fill the entire 16:9 widescreen with detail. Other networks that simulcast an event in standard definition must protect the shot for the 4:3 aspect ratio.

== Commentators ==
- Jack Edwards (play-by-play/NHL Relived host)
- Grant Fuhr (color commentary)
- Dan P. Kelly (play-by-play)
- Ron Kruck (studio host)
- Larry Murphy (color commentary)
- Judd Sirott (play-by-play)
- John Vanbiesbrouck (color commentary)
