= AXS TV Fights =

Television series

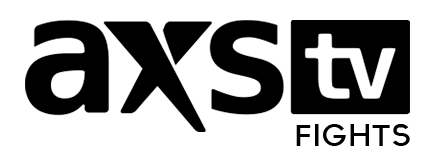
- Starring: Pat Miletich; Ron Kruck

Production
- Running time: 150 minutes or until fight card ends

Original release
- Release: 2007 – 2026

AXS TV Fights is the brand name of AXS TV's live mixed martial arts (MMA), Muay Thai and kickboxing broadcasts. Formerly known as HDNET Fights, the program's name was changed to AXS TV Fights in July 2012, following the network's rebrand from HDNET to AXS TV.

== History ==
=== Origins as HDNET Fights ===
HDNet Fights was founded in 2007 by billionaire entrepreneur Mark Cuban, owner and founder of HDNet, as a programming cornerstone to build the new network on. Cuban's goal was to present MMA in a manner more in line with other professional sports, while eliminating ancillary details such as ring card girls. Taking a hands-on approach in the business and promotion of MMA, Cuban became one of the sport's most vocal defenders in his blogs and interviews. HDNet Fights hosted its first self-promoted event on October 13, 2007, featuring a light-heavyweight main event contest between Erik Paulson and Jeff Ford. The program's second and final event, Reckless Abandon, was held two months later. Realizing that the company's strength did not lie in hosting fight cards, Cuban re-vamped the HDNet Fights concept, as HDNet began broadcasting live weekly events from other organizations, including many top regional fight promotions.

After acquiring the rights to air Japanese Fighting and Entertainment Group's MMA promotion Dream in the United States for the first time ever, HDNet premiered a repeat of the Dream 1 event on May 2, 2008. A repeat of Dream 2 aired the following day, and Dream 3 aired live on May 11. On February 6, 2009, HDNet announced they had reached an agreement with another Japanese MMA promotion, and competitor to Dream, World Victory Road. The promotion made its United States debut with a broadcast of its "Sengoku" events, opening with World Victory Road's first event of 2009 on March 20.

Under the HDNet Fights banner, the network's broadcast lineup included DREAM, Sengoku, K-1 and K-1 Max, Strikeforce, Adrenaline MMA, SportFight, Ring of Fire, Ring of Combat, M-1 Global, Ring of Honor, Maximum Fighting Championship, Affliction Entertainment, Urban Conflict Championship and the now-defunct IFL, among others.

=== As AXS TV Fights ===
Since its regeneration as AXS TV Fights, the program has become a major fixture in AXS TV's Friday night programming line-up, with the network airing over 40 live events per year. The AXS TV Fights broadcast lineup has featured events from promotions including BAMMA (USA), Legacy Fighting Championship, Lion Fight Muay Thai, Maximum Fighting Championship, Resurrection Fighting Alliance, Titan Fighting Championships, and Xtreme Fighting Championships. In August 2014, the network announced a multi-year deal with CES MMA. The following January, the network joined forces with Legacy Fighting Championship, airing the promotion’s first-ever kickboxing event on January 16, 2015.

On March 14, 2014, AXS TV Fights aired the North American premiere of the Russian Hip Show: Arena Combat. A two-on-two, points-based fighting event on a padded obstacle course instead of a traditional ring or cage. The pilot episode was a two-hour "best of" special, featuring lightweight and middleweight tournaments from 2012. English commentary was provided by Cyrus Fees and Casey Oxendine.

AXS TV Fights' presentation of LION FIGHT 16 on July 4, 2014, was the network's historic 250th fight broadcast.

On March 21, 2015, AXS TV Fights announced it would hold its first ever co-promoted mixed martial arts event featuring fighters from Resurrection Fighting Alliance (RFA) and Legacy Fighting Championship (Legacy) May 8, 2015. The event, titled "AXS TV Fights: RFA vs. Legacy Superfight" included a headlining fight between RFA Flyweight Champion Alexandre Pantoja and Legacy Flyweight Champion Damacio Page, two co-main events featuring intra-organizational title fights for each promotion, and three fights between RFA and Legacy contenders on the main card.

AXS TV Fights broadcast its 300th combat sports event on October 23, 2016, with Lion Fight 25.

On September 19, 2016, RFA president Ed Soares appeared on "The MMA Hour" to announce the merger of Resurrection Fighting Alliance and Legacy Fighting Championship to become Legacy Fighting Alliance beginning in 2017. The newly announced promotion also signed a multi-year deal with AXS TV Fights.

The network celebrated its 400th live event broadcast with LFA 40 on May 25, 2018

On September 13, 2019, was announced the end of the partnership between AXS TV and LFA.

On November 6, 2019, AXS TV and the MMA organization Combate Americas announced broadcast deal for 35 events in 2020.

== Fight commentators ==
AXS TV Fights' commentary team included UFC Hall of Famer Pat Miletich and sports broadcaster and reporter Ron Kruck, with media personality Phoenix Carnevale reporting cageside.

Sports broadcaster "The Voice" Michael Schiavello was the play-by-play commentator from 2009 to 2017. In May 2017 Schiavello announced his last event with AXS TV Fights would be Legacy Fighting Alliance 13 in Burbank, CA.

From 2010 to 2016, Schiavello also conducted in-depth interviews with combat sports stars on The Voice Versus, which aired intermittently in primetime.

== List of AXS TV Fights promotions ==
=== Past promotions ===
AXS TV Fights

AXS TV Fights has previously broadcast events from the following promotions:

- BAMMA
- Championship Fighting Alliance
- CES MMA
- Invicta Fighting Championships
- Legacy Kickboxing
- Lion Fight Muay Thai
- Legacy Fighting Alliance
- Maximum Fighting Championship
- New Japan Pro-Wrestling
- Resurrection Fighting Alliance
- Titan Fighting Championships
- Xtreme Fighting Championships

HDNET Fights

Under the HDNET Fights banner, the network broadcast fights from the following promotions:

- Adrenaline MMA
- Affliction Entertainment
- DREAM
- International Fight League
- K-1
- K1 Max
- M-1 Global
- Maximum Fighting Championship
- Ring of Combat
- Ring of Fire MMA
- Ring of Honor
- Sengoku
- SportFight
- Strikeforce
- Urban Conflict Championship

== AXS TV Fight events ==
| # | Event | Date | Location |
|---|---|---|---|
| 1 | AXS TV Fights - RFA vs. Legacy Superfight | 8 May 2015 | United States |
