= Adrenaline MMA =

Mixed martial arts promoter based in North America

- Type: Private
- Industry: Mixed Martial Arts promotion
- Founded: 2007
- Founder: Monte Cox
- Defunct: 2009

Adrenaline MMA was a mixed martial arts organization that operated primarily in North America. It was formerly part of M-1 Global but became independent in October 2007 with Monte Cox as its head.

== History ==
=== Foundation ===
In October 2007, Sibling Entertainment Group, a producer of theater and other entertainment, announced that its newly created subsidiary, Sibling Sports LLC, was purchasing M-1 Mixfight, a Russian-based mixed martial arts promotion owned by Vadim Finkelstein. The new venture was named M-1 Global. Along with the purchase, Fedor Emelianenko, the last PRIDE Heavyweight Champion and a free agent managed by Finkelstein, was to sign with the new organization. Monte Cox, an established promoter and manager who has managed fighters like UFC champions Tim Sylvia, Matt Hughes and Rich Franklin and promoted around 500 cards, was appointed its first president. Finkelstein, however, continued his M-1 operations in Russia, running the M-1 Mixfight website independently of Sibling and Cox and promoting his own events under the M-1 banner.

Although the organization had yet to hold its first card, its first co-promotion effort was Yarennoka! held in Saitama, Japan on New Year's Eve, 2007. Yarennoka! was held by former executives of PRIDE Fighting Championships, with M-1 Global billed as a co-promoter. Fedor Emelianenko appeared on the card, defeating Hong-Man Choi via armbar in the first round.

On April 19, 2008, Monte Cox confirmed that Finkelstein had split from M-1 Global. Cox also revealed that Emelianenko never actually did consummate an agreement with M-1 Global, and that Emelianenko would become a free agent again. Finkelstein would resume his operations with M-1 Mixfight, while the Sibling subsidiary headed by Cox would be known as Adrenaline, not to be confused with "ADRYNYLYN" which is an up-and-coming MMA promotional platform based out of Chicago Illinois.

The official first event took place on June 14, 2008, and was headlined by Mike Russow and Jason Guida.

Adrenaline's website is gone and has not been replaced.

== Events ==
Date	Event	Location	Venue	Attendance
12/31/2007	Yarennoka!	Saitama, Japan	Saitama Super Arena	
06/14/2008	Adrenaline MMA: Guida vs. Russow	Hoffman Estates, Illinois, United States	Sears Centre	
12/11/2008	Adrenaline MMA 2: Miletich vs. Denny	Moline, Illinois, United States	I Wireless Center	
06/13/2009	Adrenaline MMA 3: Bragging Rights	Birmingham, Alabama, United States	BJCC Arena	
09/18/2009	Adrenaline MMA 4: Sylvia vs. Riley	Council Bluffs, Iowa, United States	Mid-America Center	
